= 1990 Japanese Touring Car Championship =

Seasons
- ← 1989 1991 →

The 1990 Japanese Touring Car Championship season was the 6th edition of the series. It began at Nishi Nippon on 18 March and finished after six events at Fuji Speedway on 11 November. The championship was won by Kazuyoshi Hoshino, driving for Team Impul.

== Teams & Drivers ==
Team	Car	No.	Drivers	Class	Rounds
Hasemi Motorsport	Nissan BNR32 Skyline GT-R	1	(Japan) Masahiro Hasemi	JTC-1	All
Hasemi Motorsport	Nissan BNR32 Skyline GT-R	1	(Sweden) Anders Olofsson	JTC-1	All
Endless Project	Ford Sierra RS500	2	(Japan) Keiichi Tsuchiya	JTC-1	All
Endless Project	Ford Sierra RS500	2	(Japan) Takao Wada	JTC-1	All
Art Nature	Ford Sierra RS500	3	(Japan) Taku Akaike	JTC-1	All
Art Nature	Ford Sierra RS500	3	(Japan) Yojiro Terada	JTC-1	All
Cara Racing	BMW M3	4	(Japan) Toru Kato	JTC-2	2
Cara Racing	BMW M3	4	(Japan) Fuminori Mizuno	JTC-2	2-6
Cara Racing	BMW M3	4	(Japan) Tetsuya Ota	JTC-2	3-5
Cara Racing	BMW M3	4	(Japan) Toru Sawada	JTC-2	4-6
Cara Racing	BMW M3	4	(Japan) Shuji Huzii	JTC-2	6
Team Koyama Garage	Isuzu Gemini JT190	5	(Japan) Tomokazu Sakata	JTC-3	2-4
Team Koyama Garage	Isuzu Gemini JT190	5	(Japan) Isao Shibata	JTC-3	2
Team Koyama Garage	Isuzu Gemini JT190	5	(Japan) Akihiro Higashi	JTC-3	3
Team Koyama Garage	Isuzu Gemini JT190	5	(Japan) Michiko Okuyama	JTC-3	4
Team Koyama Garage	Isuzu Gemini JT191	5	(Japan) Tomokazu Sakata	JTC-3	6
Team Koyama Garage	Isuzu Gemini JT191	5	(Japan) Isao Shibata	JTC-3	6
Team Koyama Garage	Isuzu Gemini JT191	5	(Japan) Akihiro Higashi	JTC-3	6
Toyota Team TOM's	Toyota Corolla Levin AE92	6	(Japan) Kaoru Hoshino	JTC-3	All
Toyota Team TOM's	Toyota Corolla Levin AE92	6	(Japan) Shunji Kasuya	JTC-3	1
Toyota Team TOM's	Toyota Corolla Levin AE92	6	(Japan) Kaori Okamoto	JTC-3	2
Toyota Team TOM's	Toyota Corolla Levin AE92	6	(Argentina) Víctor Rosso	JTC-3	3, 5-6
Toyota Team TOM's	Toyota Corolla Levin AE92	6	(Japan) Kaoru Ito	JTC-3	4
Toyota Team TOM's	Toyota Corolla Levin AE92	7	(Japan) Kaoru Ito	JTC-3	1-3, 5-6
Toyota Team TOM's	Toyota Corolla Levin AE92	7	(Japan) Kaori Okamoto	JTC-3	1, 4, 6
Toyota Team TOM's	Toyota Corolla Levin AE92	7	(Argentina) Víctor Rosso	JTC-3	2
Toyota Team TOM's	Toyota Corolla Levin AE92	7	(Japan) Michiko Okuyama	JTC-3	3
Toyota Team TOM's	Toyota Corolla Levin AE92	7	(Japan) Masaki Tanaka	JTC-3	4
Toyota Team TOM's	Toyota Corolla Levin AE92	7	(Japan) Masami Kageyama	JTC-3	5
Toyota Team TOM's	Toyota Corolla Levin AE92	7	(Japan) Yasushi Takashi	JTC-3	5
Toyota Team TOM's	Toyota Corolla Levin AE92	7	(Japan) Soshiki Katsura	JTC-3	6
Toyota Team TOM's	Toyota MA70 Supra Turbo-A	36	(Japan) Hitoshi Ogawa	JTC-1	1, 3
Toyota Team TOM's	Toyota MA70 Supra Turbo-A	36	(Japan) Masanori Sekiya	JTC-1	1-2, 4
Toyota Team TOM's	Toyota MA70 Supra Turbo-A	36	(Japan) Takuya Kurosawa	JTC-1	2-6
Toyota Team TOM's	Toyota MA70 Supra Turbo-A	36	(Japan) Migaku Wataru	JTC-1	2-6
Toyota Team TOM's	Toyota MA70 Supra Turbo-A	36	(Japan) Yoshiyasu Tachi	JTC-1	5-6
Toyota Team TOM's	Toyota MA70 Supra Turbo-A	37	(Japan) Takuya Kurosawa	JTC-1	1
Toyota Team TOM's	Toyota MA70 Supra Turbo-A	37	(Japan) Migaku Wataru	JTC-1	1
Toyota Team TOM's	Toyota MA70 Supra Turbo-A	37	(Japan) Shunji Kasuya	JTC-1	2-3, 5-6
Toyota Team TOM's	Toyota MA70 Supra Turbo-A	37	(Japan) Yoshiyasu Tachi	JTC-1	2-4, 6
Toyota Team TOM's	Toyota MA70 Supra Turbo-A	37	(Japan) Naoji Sugisaki	JTC-1	4-6
Toyota Team TOM's	Toyota Corolla Levin AE92	38	(Japan) Hitoshi Ogawa	JTC-3	5-6
Toyota Team TOM's	Toyota Corolla Levin AE92	38	(Japan) Masanori Sekiya	JTC-3	5-6
Toyota Team TOM's	Toyota Corolla Levin AE92	39	(Japan) Tomohiro Aiba	JTC-3	6
Toyota Team TOM's	Toyota Corolla Levin AE92	39	(Japan) Michiko Okuyama	JTC-3	6
Toyota Team TOM's	Toyota Corolla Levin AE92	39	(Japan) Satoshi Yamaguchi	JTC-3	6
FET Racing	Ford Sierra RS500	8	(Japan) Kiyoshi Misaki	JTC-1	All
FET Racing	Ford Sierra RS500	8	(Japan) Kazuo Mogi	JTC-1	All
TOM's	Toyota Corolla Levin AE92	9	(Japan) Masahiro Matsunaga	JTC-3	All
TOM's	Toyota Corolla Levin AE92	9	(Japan) Junko Mihara	JTC-3	All
TOM's	Toyota Corolla Levin AE92	9	(Japan) Michiko Okuyama	JTC-3	1
TOM's	Toyota Corolla Levin AE92	9	(Japan) Kenji Moriya	JTC-3	2-3
TOM's	Toyota Corolla Levin AE92	9	(Japan) Hideo Uehara	JTC-3	5-6
Team Take One	BMW M3	10	(Hong Kong) Charles Kwan	JTC-2	3-4
Team Take One	BMW M3	10	(Hong Kong) Kevin Wong	JTC-2	3-4
Team Take One	BMW M3	10	(Malaysia) K. Chee Hong	JTC-2	4
Team Take One	BMW M3 Sport Evolution	10	(Japan) Eiichi Tajima	JTC-2	6
Team Take One	BMW M3 Sport Evolution	10	(Hong Kong) Kevin Wong	JTC-2	6
Team Take One	BMW M3	16	(Hong Kong) Winston Mak	JTC-2	3-4
Team Take One	BMW M3	16	(Malaysia) K. Chee Hong	JTC-2	3
Team Take One	BMW M3	16	(Japan) Kiyohiko Ito	JTC-2	4
Team Take One	BMW M3 Sport Evolution	16	(Hong Kong) Charles Kwan	JTC-2	6
Team Take One	BMW M3 Sport Evolution	16	(Hong Kong) Winston Mak	JTC-2	6
Object T	Ford Sierra RS500	11	(Japan) Hisashi Yokoshima	JTC-1	All
Object T	Ford Sierra RS500	11	(Japan) Masahiko Kageyama	JTC-1	1-4
Object T	Ford Sierra RS500	11	(Japan) Hideshi Matsuda	JTC-1	5-6
Object T	Ford Sierra RS500	22	(Japan) Hideshi Matsuda	JTC-1	1-4
Object T	Ford Sierra RS500	22	(Japan) Kazuo Shimizu	JTC-1	1-4
Object T	Nissan BNR32 Skyline GT-R	22	(Japan) Kazuo Shimizu	JTC-1	5-6
Object T	Nissan BNR32 Skyline GT-R	22	(Japan) Masahiko Kageyama	JTC-1	5-6
Team Impul	Nissan BNR32 Skyline GT-R	12	(Japan) Kazuyoshi Hoshino	JTC-1	All
Team Impul	Nissan BNR32 Skyline GT-R	12	(Japan) Toshio Suzuki	JTC-1	All
Suntec Racing	Ford Sierra RS500	13	(United States) Jeff Krosnoff	JTC-1	All
Suntec Racing	Ford Sierra RS500	13	(Italy) Mauro Martini	JTC-1	All
Mooncraft	Honda Civic EF9	14	(Japan) Shigeru Muramatsu	JTC-3	1
Mooncraft	Honda Civic EF9	14	(Japan) Akihiko Nakaya	JTC-3	1
Mooncraft	Honda Civic EF9	14	(Japan) Hisatoyo Goto	JTC-3	2-6
Mooncraft	Honda Civic EF9	14	(Japan) Naoki Hattori	JTC-3	2-6
Nakajima Planning	Honda Civic EF9	15	(Japan) Naoki Hattori	JTC-3	1
Nakajima Planning	Honda Civic EF9	15	(Japan) Koji Sato	JTC-3	All
Nakajima Planning	Honda Civic EF9	15	(Japan) Akihiko Nakaya	JTC-3	2-6
Asano Racing Service	Toyota Corolla Levin AE92	18	(Japan) Takeo Asano	JTC-3	All
Asano Racing Service	Toyota Corolla Levin AE92	18	(Japan) Makoto Hagiwara	JTC-3	All
Racing Project Bandoh	Toyota Corolla Levin AE92	19	(Japan) Masakazu Hamana	JTC-3	3-6
Racing Project Bandoh	Toyota Corolla Levin AE92	19	(Japan) Hiroyuki Kawai	JTC-3	3-6
Racing Project Bandoh	Toyota Corolla Levin AE92	19	(Japan) Tadashi Nishigaichi	JTC-3	3
Napolex Racing Team	Ford Sierra RS500	20	(Italy) Paolo Barilla	JTC-1	6
Napolex Racing Team	Ford Sierra RS500	20	(United Kingdom) Robb Gravett	JTC-1	6
Napolex Racing Team	Ford Sierra RS500	20	(Sweden) Stefan Johansson	JTC-1	6
JRDA/Moritani	Honda Civic EF3	21	(Japan) Nao Maekawa	JTC-3	1
JRDA/Moritani	Honda Civic EF3	21	(Japan) Masami Miyoshi	JTC-3	1
JRDA/Moritani	Honda Civic EF3	90	(Japan) Masami Miyoshi	JTC-3	2-6
JRDA/Moritani	Honda Civic EF3	90	(Japan) Masahiko Hanayama	JTC-3	2
JRDA/Moritani	Honda Civic EF3	90	(Japan) Nao Maekawa	JTC-3	3, 6
JRDA/Moritani	Honda Civic EF3	90	(Japan) Keiichi Kobayashi	JTC-3	3
JRDA/Moritani	Honda Civic EF3	90	(Japan) Kyoshitsu Yuki	JTC-3	3, 6
JRDA/Moritani	Honda Civic EF3	90	(Japan) Norio Ajiro	JTC-3	4
JRDA/Moritani	Honda Civic EF3	90	(Japan) Toshihiro Yoshida	JTC-3	5-6
Team Advan	Toyota Corolla Levin AE92	25	(Japan) Morio Nitta	JTC-3	All
Team Advan	Toyota Corolla Levin AE92	25	(Japan) Keiichi Suzuki	JTC-3	All
Team Advan	Toyota Corolla Levin AE92	28	(Japan) Shinichi Aoki	JTC-3	1
Team Advan	Toyota Corolla Levin AE92	28	(Japan) Akira Shibata	JTC-3	All
Team Advan	Toyota Corolla Levin AE92	28	(Japan) Akihiro Oshima	JTC-3	2-6
Team Taisan	BMW M3	26	(United Kingdom) Will Hoy	JTC-2^{1}	1-4
Team Taisan	BMW M3	26	(Japan) Kenji Takahashi	JTC-2^{1}	1-4
Team Taisan	BMW M3 Sport Evolution	26	(United Kingdom) Will Hoy	JTC-2	5-6
Team Taisan	BMW M3 Sport Evolution	26	(Japan) Kenji Takahashi	JTC-2	5-6
Trust Racing	Toyota Corolla Levin AE92	27	(Japan) Masakazu Hamana	JTC-3	2
Trust Racing	Toyota Corolla Levin AE92	27	(Japan) Mitsutake Koma	JTC-3	2-6
Trust Racing	Toyota Corolla Levin AE92	27	(Japan) Tatsuhiko Seki	JTC-3	3-6
Trust Racing	Toyota Corolla Levin AE92	27	(Japan) Kazuhisa Shimura	JTC-3	4-5
Trust Racing	Toyota Corolla Levin AE92	27	(Japan) Ryusaku Hitomi	JTC-3	6
B-ing Kegani Racing	BMW M3	29	(Japan) Yasuo Kusakabe	JTC-2^{1}	1-3
B-ing Kegani Racing	BMW M3	29	(Japan) Shinya Yamauchi	JTC-2^{1}	1-3
B-ing Kegani Racing	BMW M3 Sport Evolution	29	(Japan) Yasuo Kusakabe	JTC-2	4-6
B-ing Kegani Racing	BMW M3 Sport Evolution	29	(Japan) Shinya Yamauchi	JTC-2	4-6
Racing Forum	Honda Civic EF3	33	(Japan) Yasuo Muramatsu	JTC-3	1-5
Racing Forum	Honda Civic EF3	33	(Japan) Tomohiko Tsutsumi	JTC-3	1-5
Racing Forum	Honda Civic EF9	33	(Japan) Yasuo Muramatsu	JTC-3	6
Racing Forum	Honda Civic EF9	33	(Japan) Seiichi Sodeyama	JTC-3	6
Racing Forum	Honda Civic EF9	33	(Japan) Tomohiko Tsutsumi	JTC-3	6
Auto Tech Racing	BMW M3	35	(Japan) Takamasa Nakagawa	JTC-2^{1}	1-4, 6
Auto Tech Racing	BMW M3	35	(Austria) Roland Ratzenberger	JTC-2^{1}	1-4, 6
Auto Tech Racing	BMW M3 Sport Evolution	35	(Japan) Takamasa Nakagawa	JTC-2	5
Auto Tech Racing	BMW M3 Sport Evolution	35	(Austria) Roland Ratzenberger	JTC-2	5
Auto Tech Racing	BMW M3	72	(Japan) Norio Makiguchi	JTC-2	4-6
Auto Tech Racing	BMW M3	72	(Japan) Hiroyuki Noji	JTC-2	4-6
Auto Tech Racing	BMW M3	72	(Japan) Sanshu Tanaka	JTC-2	6
City Life 43	Ford Sierra RS500	43	(Japan) Naoki Nagasaka	JTC-1	All
City Life 43	Ford Sierra RS500	43	(Japan) Mamoru Takashi	JTC-1	1-5
City Life 43	Ford Sierra RS500	43	(United Kingdom) Chris Hodgetts	JTC-1	5-6
Toyota Team Thailand	Toyota Corolla Levin AE92	45	(Japan) Hidenori Okuzumi	JTC-3	6
Toyota Team Thailand	Toyota Corolla Levin AE92	45	(Thailand) Sutthipong Samitchart	JTC-3	6
Toyota Team Thailand	Toyota Corolla Levin AE92	45	(Thailand) Suphot Kasikam	JTC-3	6
Toyota Team Thailand	Toyota Corolla Levin AE92	59	(Japan) Tomohiro Aiba	JTC-3	6
Toyota Team Thailand	Toyota Corolla Levin AE92	59	(Thailand) Prasert Aphiphunya	JTC-3	6
Toyota Team Thailand	Toyota Corolla Levin AE92	59	(Thailand) Kriangkrai Limnantarak	JTC-3	6
FMR	BMW M3	56	(Japan) Hirokazu Kashihara	JTC-2	2-4
FMR	BMW M3	56	(Japan) Susumu Shinozuka	JTC-2	2-4
FMR	BMW M3	56	(Japan) Fumio Mutoh	JTC-2	5-6
FMR	BMW M3	56	(Japan) Motoshi Sekine	JTC-2	5-6
Team Yamato	Honda Civic EF3	67	(Japan) Tsugio Oba	JTC-3	3, 5-6
Team Yamato	Honda Civic EF3	67	(Japan) Yoshiaki Sato	JTC-3	3, 5-6
Team Yamato	Honda Civic EF3	67	(Japan) Yasuo Kezuka	JTC-3	6
Hitotsuyama Racing	BMW M3	70	(Japan) Hideo Fukuyama	JTC-2	2-6
Hitotsuyama Racing	BMW M3	70	(Japan) Mikio Hitotsuyama	JTC-2	2, 5-6
Hitotsuyama Racing	BMW M3	70	(Japan) Akira Yasunaga	JTC-2	2-4
Hitotsuyama Racing	BMW M3	70	(Japan) Yasushi Hitotsuyama	JTC-2	3-4
Hitotsuyama Racing	BMW M3	70	(Japan) Yoshimi Watanabe	JTC-2	3
Hitotsuyama Racing	BMW M3	72	(Japan) Norio Makiguchi	JTC-2	2-3
Hitotsuyama Racing	BMW M3	72	(Japan) Hiroyuki Noji	JTC-2	2-3
Allan Moffat Enterprises	Ford Sierra RS500	91	(Australia) Gregg Hansford	JTC-1	6
Allan Moffat Enterprises	Ford Sierra RS500	91	(Australia) Allan Moffat	JTC-1	6
Allan Moffat Enterprises	Ford Sierra RS500	91	(Germany) Klaus Niedzwiedz	JTC-1	6
Team CMS Sweden	Ford Sierra RS500	99	(Sweden) Christer Simonsen	JTC-1	6
Team CMS Sweden	Ford Sierra RS500	99	(Sweden) Kurt Simonsen	JTC-1	6
Mugen Honda	Honda Civic EF9	100	(Japan) Osamu Nakako	JTC-3	All
Mugen Honda	Honda Civic EF9	100	(Japan) Hideki Okada	JTC-3	All

Icon	Class
JTC-1	over 2500cc
JTC-2	1601-2500cc
JTC-3	Up to 1600cc

^{1}Due to insufficient JTC-2 entries at Round 1, the class was combined with JTC-1.

== Calendar ==
Overall winner in bold.

Round	Circuit	Date	JTC-1 Winning Team	JTC-2 Winning Team	JTC-3 Winning Team
Round	Circuit	Date	JTC-1 Winning Drivers	JTC-2 Winning Drivers	JTC-3 Winning Drivers
1	(Japan) Nishi Nippon, Yamaguchi	18 March	**#12 Team Impul**	N/A	#14 Mooncraft
1	(Japan) Nishi Nippon, Yamaguchi	18 March	**(Japan) Kazuyoshi Hoshino** **(Japan) Toshio Suzuki**	N/A	(Japan) Shigeru Muramatsu (Japan) Akihiko Nakaya
2	(Japan) Sportsland SUGO, Miyagi	20 May	**#12 Team Impul**	#29 B-ing Kegani Racing	#25 Team Advan
2	(Japan) Sportsland SUGO, Miyagi	20 May	**(Japan) Kazuyoshi Hoshino** **(Japan) Toshio Suzuki**	(Japan) Yasuo Kusakabe (Japan) Shinya Yamauchi	(Japan) Morio Nitta (Japan) Keiichi Suzuki
3	(Japan) Suzuka Circuit, Mie	1 July	**#1 Hasemi Motorsport**	#35 Auto Tech Racing	#100 Mugen Honda
3	(Japan) Suzuka Circuit, Mie	1 July	**(Japan) Masahiro Hasemi** **(Sweden) Anders Olofsson**	(Japan) Takamasa Nakagawa (Austria) Roland Ratzenberger	(Japan) Osamu Nakako (Japan) Hideki Okada
4	(Japan) Tsukuba Circuit, Ibaraki	19 August	**#12 Team Impul**	#35 Auto Tech Racing	#25 Team Advan
4	(Japan) Tsukuba Circuit, Ibaraki	19 August	**(Japan) Kazuyoshi Hoshino** **(Japan) Toshio Suzuki**	(Japan) Takamasa Nakagawa (Austria) Roland Ratzenberger	(Japan) Morio Nitta (Japan) Keiichi Suzuki
5	(Japan) Sendai Hi-Land Raceway, Miyagi	30 September	**#12 Team Impul**	#26 Team Taisan	#100 Mugen Honda
5	(Japan) Sendai Hi-Land Raceway, Miyagi	30 September	**(Japan) Kazuyoshi Hoshino** **(Japan) Toshio Suzuki**	(United Kingdom) Will Hoy (Japan) Kenji Takahashi	(Japan) Osamu Nakako (Japan) Hideki Okada
6	(Japan) Fuji Speedway, Shizuoka	11 November	**#12 Team Impul**	#29 B-ing Kegani Racing	#25 Team Advan
6	(Japan) Fuji Speedway, Shizuoka	11 November	**(Japan) Kazuyoshi Hoshino** **(Japan) Toshio Suzuki**	(Japan) Yasuo Kusakabe (Japan) Shinya Yamauchi	(Japan) Morio Nitta (Japan) Keiichi Suzuki

== Championship Standings ==
Points were awarded 20, 15, 12, 10, 8, 6, 4, 3, 2, 1 to the overall top 10 as well as top 10 finishers in each class, with no bonus points for pole positions or fastest laps. All scores counted towards the championship. In cases where teammates tied on points, the driver who completed the greater distance during the season was given the higher classification.

Pos	Driver	NIS	SUG	SUZ	TSU	SEN	FUJ	Pts	Distance
1	(Japan) Kazuyoshi Hoshino	**1**	1	**2**	1	**1**	**1**	230	1240.77 km
2	(Japan) Toshio Suzuki	**1**	1	**2**	1	**1**	**1**	230	960.16 km
3	(Japan) Masahiro Hasemi	2	**2**	1	**Ret**	2	2	160	1066.31 km
4	(Sweden) Anders Olofsson	2	**2**	1	**Ret**	2	2	160	832.85 km
5	(Japan) Keiichi Suzuki	15	8	17	6	12	8	104	1119.25 km
6	(Japan) Morio Nitta	15	8	17	6	12	8	104	946.84 km
7	(Austria) Roland Ratzenberger	9	10	8	4	14	18	98	1098.15 km
8	(Japan) Takamasa Nakagawa	9	10	8	4	14	18	98	947.92 km
9	(Japan) Hisashi Yokoshima	4	3	5	Ret	6	5	88	Unknown
10	(Japan) Masahiko Kageyama	4	3	5	Ret	3	Ret	84	Unknown
11/12	(Japan) Yasuo Kusakabe	10	9	15	10	26	7	79	Unknown
11/12	(Japan) Shinya Yamauchi	10	9	15	10	26	7	79	Unknown
13/14	(Japan) Osamu Nakako	16	11	11	19	9	12	78	Unknown
13/14	(Japan) Hideki Okada	16	11	11	19	9	12	78	Unknown
15	(Japan) Hideshi Matsuda	Ret	Ret	4	3	6	5	72	Unknown
16/17	(Japan) Kiyoshi Misaki	6	4	3	14	7	21	72	Unknown
16/17	(Japan) Kazuo Mogi	6	4	3	14	7	21	72	Unknown
18	(Japan) Kazuo Shimizu	Ret	Ret	4	3	3	Ret	68	Unknown
19/20	(United Kingdom) Will Hoy	7	Ret	9	9	8	Ret	62	Unknown
19/20	(Japan) Kenji Takahashi	7	Ret	9	9	8	Ret	62	Unknown
21/22	(Japan) Taku Akaike	8	Ret	10	2	22	4	61	Unknown
21/22	(Japan) Yojiro Terada	8	Ret	10	2	22	4	61	Unknown
23	(Japan) Masanori Sekiya	5	7		8	16	10	57	Unknown
24	(Japan) Akihiko Nakaya	11	Ret	13	11	29	15	56	Unknown
25/26	(United States) Jeff Krosnoff	3	5	7	Ret	11	Ret	51	Unknown
25/26	(Italy) Mauro Martini	3	5	7	Ret	11	Ret	51	Unknown
27	(Japan) Koji Sato	14	Ret	13	11	29	15	49	Unknown
28/29	(Japan) Keiichi Tsuchiya	Ret	6	6	Ret	4	Ret	44	Unknown
28/29	(Japan) Takao Wada	Ret	6	6	Ret	4	Ret	44	Unknown
30	(Japan) Naoki Hattori	14	15	Ret	18	10	23	44	Unknown
31	(Japan) Hideo Fukuyama		Ret	Ret	5	27	17	41	Unknown
32	(Japan) Hitoshi Ogawa	5		23		16	10	39	Unknown
33	(Japan) Naoki Nagasaka	12	Ret	Ret	7	5	9	36	Unknown
34	(Japan) Hisatoyo Goto		15	Ret	18	10	23	32	Unknown
35	(Japan) Masami Miyoshi	17	Ret	18	DNQ	13	13	32	Unknown
36	(Japan) Fuminori Mizuno		14	16	Ret	17	Ret	32	Unknown
37/38	(Japan) Yasuo Muramatsu	13	Ret	Ret	16	15	Ret	31	Unknown
37/38	(Japan) Tomohiko Tsutsumi	13	Ret	Ret	16	15	Ret	31	Unknown
39	(Hong Kong) Kevin Wong			21	20		14	29	Unknown
40/41	(Australia) Gregg Hansford						3	24	Unknown
40/41	(Germany) Klaus Niedzwiedz						3	24	Unknown
42/43	(Japan) Norio Makiguchi		13	Ret	12	28	Ret	24	Unknown
42/43	(Japan) Hiroyuki Noji		13	Ret	12	28	Ret	24	Unknown
44	(Argentina) Víctor Rosso		12	14		Ret	Ret	24	Unknown
45	(Japan) Mitsutake Koma		18	19	13	23	Ret	24	Unknown
46	(Japan) Akira Yasunaga		Ret	Ret	5			23	Unknown
47	(Japan) Yasushi Hitotsuyama			Ret	5			23	Unknown
48	(Japan) Masakazu Hamana		18	20	Ret	21	11	23	Unknown
49	(United Kingdom) Chris Hodgetts					5	9	22	Unknown
50	(Japan) Nao Maekawa	17		18			13	22	Unknown
51	(Japan) Tetsuya Ota			16	Ret	17		22	Unknown
52	(Hong Kong) Charles Kwan			21	20		20	22	Unknown
53/54	(Japan) Takuya Kurosawa	Ret	7	23	8	Ret	Ret	20	Unknown
53/54	(Japan) Migaku Wataru	Ret	7	23	8	Ret	Ret	20	Unknown
55	(Japan) Shigeru Muramatsu	11						20	Unknown
56	(Japan) Tatsuhiko Seki			19	13	23	Ret	20	Unknown
57	(Japan) Hiroyuki Kawai			20	Ret	21	11	19	Unknown
58	(Japan) Kaoru Ito	19	12	Ret	Ret	20	Ret	19	Unknown
59	(Japan) Kaoru Hoshino	Ret	17	14	Ret	Ret	Ret	18	Unknown
60/61	(Japan) Takeo Asano	Ret	16	Ret	15	Ret	Ret	18	Unknown
60/61	(Japan) Makoto Hagiwara	Ret	16	Ret	15	Ret	Ret	18	Unknown
62	(Japan) Mikio Hitotsuyama		Ret			27	17	18	Unknown
63	(Japan) Kyushitsu Yuki			18			13	16	Unknown
64/65	(Japan) Fumio Mutoh					18	24	16	Unknown
64/65	(Japan) Motoshi Sekine					18	24	16	Unknown
66	(Japan) Eiichi Tajima						14	15	Unknown
67	(Japan) Kaori Okamoto	19	17		17		Ret	15	Unknown
68	(Japan) Mamoru Takashi	12	Ret	Ret	7	DNS		14	Unknown
69/70	(Sweden) Christer Simonsen						6	12	Unknown
69/70	(Sweden) Kurt Simonsen						6	12	Unknown
71	(Japan) Kazuhisa Shimura				13	DNS		12	Unknown
72	(Japan) Yoshimi Watanabe						17	12	Unknown
73	(Japan) Toshihiro Yoshida					13	DNS	10	Unknown
74	(Japan) Toru Kato		14					10	Unknown
75	(Japan) Keiichi Kobayashi			18				8	Unknown
76	(Hong Kong) Winston Mak			Ret	Ret		20	8	Unknown
77	(Japan) Shunji Kasuya	Ret	Ret	12		19	16	7	Unknown
78	(Japan) Akira Shibata	18	Ret	22	Ret	25	Ret	7	Unknown
79	(Japan) Masaki Tanaka				17			6	Unknown
80	(Malaysia) K. Chee Hong			Ret	20			6	Unknown
81	(Japan) Yoshiyasu Tachi		Ret	12	Ret	Ret	Ret	5	Unknown
81	(Japan) Yoshiyasu Tachi		Ret	12	Ret	Ret	16	5	Unknown
82	(Japan) Naoji Sugisaki				Ret	19	16	5	Unknown
83	(Japan) Shinichi Aoki	18						4	Unknown
84/85	(Thailand) Prasert Aphiphunya						19	4	Unknown
84/85	(Thailand) Kriangkrai Limnantarak						19	4	Unknown
86	(Japan) Tadashi Nishigaichi			20				4	Unknown
87	(Japan) Masami Kageyama					20		4	Unknown
88/89	(Japan) Masahiro Matsunaga	20	Ret	Ret	DNQ	24	DNS	3	Unknown
88/89	(Japan) Junko Mihara	20	Ret	Ret	DNQ	24	DNS	3	Unknown
90	(Japan) Akihiro Oshima		Ret	22	Ret	25	Ret	3	Unknown
91/92	(Thailand) Sutthipong Samitchart						22	3	Unknown
91/92	(Thailand) Kasikam Suphot						22	3	Unknown
93	(Japan) Michiko Okuyama	20		Ret	DNQ		Ret	2	Unknown
94	(Japan) Hideo Uehara					24	DNS	1	Unknown
NC	(Japan) Tomokazu Sakata		Ret	Ret	DNQ		Ret	0	Unknown
NC	(Japan) Tsugio Oba			Ret		Ret	Ret	0	Unknown
NC	(Japan) Yoshiaki Sato			Ret		Ret	Ret	0	Unknown
NC	(Japan) Kenji Moriya		Ret	Ret				0	Unknown
NC	(Japan) Isao Shibata		Ret				Ret	0	Unknown
NC	(Japan) Hirokazu Kashihara		Ret	Ret	DNQ			0	Unknown
NC	(Japan) Susumu Shinozuka		Ret	Ret	DNQ			0	Unknown
NC	(Japan) Tomohiro Aiba						Ret	0	Unknown
NC	(Japan) Tomohiro Aiba						DNS	0	Unknown
NC	(Japan) Masahiko Hanayama		Ret					0	Unknown
NC	(Japan) Akihiro Higashi			Ret				0	Unknown
NC	(Japan) Kiyohiko Ito				Ret			0	Unknown
NC	(Italy) Paolo Barilla						Ret	0	Unknown
NC	(United Kingdom) Robb Gravett						Ret	0	Unknown
NC	(Sweden) Stefan Johansson						Ret	0	Unknown
NC	(Japan) Shuji Huzii						Ret	0	Unknown
NC	(Japan) Seiichi Sodeyama						Ret	0	Unknown
NC	(Japan) Ryusaku Hitomi						Ret	0	Unknown
NC	(Japan) Yasuo Kezuka						Ret	0	Unknown
NC	(Japan) Kawaji Takahashi						Ret	0	Unknown
NC	(Japan) Satoshi Yamaguchi						Ret	0	Unknown
NC	(Japan) Toru Sawada				DNS	DNS	DNS	0	0.00 km
NC	(Japan) Yasushi Takashi					DNS		0	0.00 km
NC	(Australia) Allan Moffat						DNS	0	0.00 km
NC	(Japan) Sanshu Tanaka						DNS	0	0.00 km
NC	(Japan) Soshiki Katsura						DNS	0	0.00 km
NC	(Japan) Hidenori Okuzumi						DNS	0	0.00 km
NC	(Japan) Norio Ajiro				DNQ			0	0.00 km
Pos	Driver	NIS	SUG	SUZ	TSU	SEN	FUJ	Pts	Distance

Colour	Result
Gold	Winner
Silver	Second place
Bronze	Third place
Green	Points classification
Blue	Non-points classification
Blue	Non-classified finish (NC)
Purple	Retired, not classified (Ret)
Red	Did not qualify (DNQ)
Red	Did not pre-qualify (DNPQ)
Black	Disqualified (DSQ)
White	Did not start (DNS)
White	Withdrew (WD)
White	Race cancelled (C)
Blank	Did not practice (DNP)
Blank	Did not arrive (DNA)
Blank	Excluded (EX)

**Bold** - Pole
Italics - Fastest lap
