= 1991 Japanese Touring Car Championship =

Seasons
- ← 1990 1992 →

The 1991 Japanese Touring Car Championship season was the 7th edition of the series. It began at Sportsland SUGO on 19 May and finished after six events at Fuji Speedway on 10 November. The championship was won by Masahiro Hasemi, driving for Hasemi Motorsport.

== Teams & Drivers ==
Team	Car	No.	Drivers	Class	Rounds
Team Impul	Nissan BNR32 Skyline GT-R	1	(Japan) Kazuyoshi Hoshino	JTC-1	All
Team Impul	Nissan BNR32 Skyline GT-R	1	(Japan) Toshio Suzuki	JTC-1	All
Team Taisan	Nissan BNR32 Skyline GT-R	2	(Japan) Kenji Takahashi	JTC-1	All
Team Taisan	Nissan BNR32 Skyline GT-R	2	(Japan) Keiichi Tsuchiya	JTC-1	All
Team Taisan	Nissan BNR32 Skyline GT-R	2	(Australia) Mark Skaife	JTC-1	6
Team Taisan	BMW M3 Sport Evolution	26	(Japan) Atsushi Kawamoto	JTC-2	All
Team Taisan	BMW M3 Sport Evolution	26	(Japan) Fuminori Mizuno	JTC-2	All
Hasemi Motorsport	Nissan BNR32 Skyline GT-R	3	(Japan) Masahiro Hasemi	JTC-1	3-6
Hasemi Motorsport	Nissan BNR32 Skyline GT-R	3	(Sweden) Anders Olofsson	JTC-1	3-6
Hasemi Motorsport	Nissan BNR32 Skyline GT-R	50	(Japan) Masahiro Hasemi	JTC-1	1-2
Hasemi Motorsport	Nissan BNR32 Skyline GT-R	50	(Sweden) Anders Olofsson	JTC-1	1-2
Cara Racing	BMW M3 Sport Evolution	4	(Japan) Hiroyuki Noji	JTC-2	2-6
Cara Racing	BMW M3 Sport Evolution	4	(Japan) Toru Sawada	JTC-2	2-5
Cara Racing	BMW M3 Sport Evolution	4	(Japan) Hideshi Matsuda	JTC-2	2, 4-6
Team Koyama Garage	Isuzu Gemini JT191	5	(Japan) Isao Shibata	JTC-3	1, 6
Team Koyama Garage	Isuzu Gemini JT191	5	(Japan) Yasuo Kusakabe	JTC-3	1
Team Koyama Garage	Isuzu Gemini JT191	5	(Japan) Akihiro Higashi	JTC-3	3, 6
Team Koyama Garage	Isuzu Gemini JT191	5	(Japan) Takashi Ooi	JTC-3	3
Team Koyama Garage	Isuzu Gemini JT191	5	(Japan) Toshihiko Nogami	JTC-3	6
TOM's	Toyota Corolla Levin AE92	6	(Japan) Shunji Kasuya	JTC-3	1-2, 5-6
TOM's	Toyota Corolla Levin AE92	6	(Japan) Kaori Okamoto	JTC-3	1-2, 5-6
TOM's	Toyota Corolla Levin AE92	7	(Japan) Masahiro Matsunaga	JTC-3	1, 3-6
TOM's	Toyota Corolla Levin AE92	7	(Japan) Junko Mihara	JTC-3	1, 3-6
FET Racing	Ford Sierra RS500	8	(Japan) Kiyoshi Misaki	JTC-1	1-5
FET Racing	Ford Sierra RS500	8	(Japan) Naoki Nagasaka	JTC-1	1-5
FET Racing	Nissan BNR32 Skyline GT-R	8	(Japan) Kiyoshi Misaki	JTC-1	6
FET Racing	Nissan BNR32 Skyline GT-R	8	(Japan) Naoki Nagasaka	JTC-1	6
Team Take One	BMW M3 Sport Evolution	9	(Japan) Takamasa Nakagawa	JTC-2	2, 5
Team Take One	BMW M3 Sport Evolution	9	(Hong Kong) Kevin Wong	JTC-2	2
Team Take One	BMW M3 Sport Evolution	9	(Hong Kong) Charles Kwan	JTC-2	5
Team Take One	BMW M3 Sport Evolution	9	(Hong Kong) Winston Mak	JTC-2	6
Team Take One	BMW M3 Sport Evolution	9	(Japan) Eiichi Tajima	JTC-2	6
Team Take One	BMW M3 Sport Evolution	10	(Hong Kong) Winston Mak	JTC-2	1-2, 5
Team Take One	BMW M3 Sport Evolution	10	(Hong Kong) Charles Kwan	JTC-2	1-2
Team Take One	BMW M3 Sport Evolution	10	(Japan) Eiichi Tajima	JTC-2	2, 5
Team Take One	BMW M3 Sport Evolution	10	(Hong Kong) Kevin Wong	JTC-2	5-6
Team Take One	BMW M3 Sport Evolution	10	(Japan) Takashi Ooi	JTC-2	6
Team Take One	BMW M3 Sport Evolution	16	(Japan) Takamasa Nakagawa	JTC-2	1
Team Take One	BMW M3 Sport Evolution	16	(Hong Kong) Kevin Wong	JTC-2	1
Object T	Toyota Corolla Levin AE92	11	(Japan) Hisashi Yokoshima	JTC-3	All
Object T	Toyota Corolla Levin AE92	11	(Japan) Hisashi Wada	JTC-3	1-5
Object T	Toyota Corolla Levin AE92	11	(Japan) Takamasa Nakagawa	JTC-3	6
Object T	Nissan BNR32 Skyline GT-R	22	(Japan) Masahiko Kageyama	JTC-1	All
Object T	Nissan BNR32 Skyline GT-R	22	(Japan) Kazuo Shimizu	JTC-1	All
Napolex Racing Team	Nissan BNR32 Skyline GT-R	12	(Italy) Paolo Barilla	JTC-1	6
Napolex Racing Team	Nissan BNR32 Skyline GT-R	12	(Sweden) Stefan Johansson	JTC-1	6
Mooncraft	Honda Civic EF9	14	(Japan) Naoki Hattori	JTC-3	All
Mooncraft	Honda Civic EF9	14	(Japan) Akihiko Nakaya	JTC-3	All
Nakajima Planning	Honda Civic EF9	15	(Japan) Hisatoyo Goto	JTC-3	All
Nakajima Planning	Honda Civic EF9	15	(Japan) Koji Sato	JTC-3	All
Cherena Racing Team	BMW M3 Sport Evolution	17	(Japan) Ryuichi Natsukawa	JTC-2	1-4, 6
Cherena Racing Team	BMW M3 Sport Evolution	17	(Japan) Masahiko Kondō	JTC-2	1, 3-4, 6
Cherena Racing Team	BMW M3 Sport Evolution	17	(Japan) Katsutomo Kaneishi	JTC-2	2-3
Asano Racing Service	Toyota Corolla Levin AE92	18	(Japan) Takeo Asano	JTC-3	All
Asano Racing Service	Toyota Corolla Levin AE92	18	(Japan) Makoto Hagiwara	JTC-3	All
Racing Project Bandoh	Toyota Corolla Levin AE92	19	(Japan) Shinji Tsunashima	JTC-3	All
Racing Project Bandoh	Toyota Corolla Levin AE92	19	(Japan) Hiroyuki Kawai	JTC-3	All
Racing Project Bandoh	Toyota Corolla Levin AE92	19	(Japan) Shoji Kasai	JTC-3	1
Racing Project Bandoh	Toyota Corolla Levin AE92	19	(Japan) Tomoyuki Hosono	JTC-3	6
Hitotsuyama Racing	BMW M3 Sport Evolution	21	(Japan) Hideo Fukuyama	JTC-2	All
Hitotsuyama Racing	BMW M3 Sport Evolution	21	(Japan) Yasushi Hitotsuyama	JTC-2	All
Hitotsuyama Racing	BMW M3 Sport Evolution	21	(Japan) Mikio Hitotsuyama	JTC-2	1-2, 4-6
Team Advan	Toyota Corolla Levin AE92	25	(Japan) Morio Nitta	JTC-3	1-5
Team Advan	Toyota Corolla Levin AE92	25	(Japan) Keiichi Suzuki	JTC-3	1-5
Team Advan	Toyota Corolla Levin AE101	25	(Japan) Morio Nitta	JTC-3	6
Team Advan	Toyota Corolla Levin AE101	25	(Japan) Keiichi Suzuki	JTC-3	6
Team Advan	Toyota Corolla Levin AE92	28	(Japan) Takeshi Kubo	JTC-3	1, 3-4, 6
Team Advan	Toyota Corolla Levin AE92	28	(Japan) Akira Shibata	JTC-3	1, 3-4, 6
Trust Racing	Toyota Corolla Levin AE92	27	(Japan) Mitsutake Koma	JTC-3	All
Trust Racing	Toyota Corolla Levin AE92	27	(Japan) Tomoyuki Hosono	JTC-3	1-5
Trust Racing	Toyota Corolla Levin AE92	27	(Japan) Ryusaku Hitomi	JTC-3	1-4, 6
Trust Racing	Toyota Corolla Levin AE92	27	(United Kingdom) James Kaye	JTC-3	6
B-ing Kegani Racing	BMW M3 Sport Evolution	29	(Japan) Kazuo Mogi	JTC-2	All
B-ing Kegani Racing	BMW M3 Sport Evolution	29	(Japan) Sakai Obata	JTC-2	All
Nismo	Nissan BNR32 Skyline GT-R	32	(Japan) Ryu Haruki	JTC-1	3-4
Nismo	Nissan BNR32 Skyline GT-R	32	(Japan) Eiji Yamada	JTC-1	3-4
Racing Forum	Ford Sierra RS500	33	(Japan) Takahiko Hara	JTC-1	1
Racing Forum	Ford Sierra RS500	33	(Japan) Yasuo Muramatsu	JTC-1	1
Racing Forum	Honda Civic EF9	33	(Japan) Takahiko Hara	JTC-3	2-6
Racing Forum	Honda Civic EF9	33	(Japan) Yasuo Muramatsu	JTC-3	2-6
Auto Tech Racing	BMW M3 Sport Evolution	34	(Belgium) Philippe Adams	JTC-2	3, 6
Auto Tech Racing	BMW M3 Sport Evolution	34	(United Kingdom) Andrew Gilbert-Scott	JTC-2	3, 6
Auto Tech Racing	BMW M3 Sport Evolution	35	(Sweden) Thomas Danielsson	JTC-2	All
Auto Tech Racing	BMW M3 Sport Evolution	35	(Austria) Roland Ratzenberger	JTC-2	All
Toyota Team TOM's	Toyota Corolla Levin AE92	36	(Japan) Hitoshi Ogawa	JTC-3	1-5
Toyota Team TOM's	Toyota Corolla Levin AE92	36	(Japan) Masanori Sekiya	JTC-3	1-5
Toyota Team TOM's	Toyota Corolla Levin AE101	36	(Japan) Hitoshi Ogawa	JTC-3	6
Toyota Team TOM's	Toyota Corolla Levin AE101	36	(Japan) Masanori Sekiya	JTC-3	6
Toyota Team TOM's	Toyota Corolla Levin AE92	37	(Japan) Kaoru Hoshino	JTC-3	1-5
Toyota Team TOM's	Toyota Corolla Levin AE92	37	(Argentina) Víctor Rosso	JTC-3	1-2, 4-5
Toyota Team TOM's	Toyota Corolla Levin AE92	37	(Japan) Takuya Kurosawa	JTC-3	3
Toyota Team TOM's	Toyota Corolla Levin AE101	37	(Japan) Kaoru Hoshino	JTC-3	6
Toyota Team TOM's	Toyota Corolla Levin AE101	37	(Argentina) Víctor Rosso	JTC-3	6
Toyota Team Thailand	Toyota Corolla Levin AE92	45	(Thailand) Sutthipong Samitchart	JTC-3	6
Toyota Team Thailand	Toyota Corolla Levin AE92	45	(Thailand) Kasikam Suphot	JTC-3	6
Concept L Racing Team	Honda Civic EF9	55	(Japan) Masahiko Hanayama	JTC-3	6
Concept L Racing Team	Honda Civic EF9	55	(Japan) Masami Kageyama	JTC-3	6
Concept L Racing Team	Honda Civic EF9	55	(Japan) Kumi Sato	JTC-3	6
FMR	BMW M3 Sport Evolution	56	(Japan) Fumio Mutoh	JTC-2	1-2, 4-6
FMR	BMW M3 Sport Evolution	56	(Japan) Satoshi Ikezawa	JTC-2	1-3
FMR	BMW M3 Sport Evolution	56	(Japan) Hironori Takeuchi	JTC-2	3-6
FMR	BMW M3 Sport Evolution	56	(Japan) Toshikazu Kanamori	JTC-2	5
AP National	Toyota Corolla Levin AE92	59	(Thailand) Prasert Aphiphunya	JTC-3	6
AP National	Toyota Corolla Levin AE92	59	(Thailand) Kriangkrai Limnantarak	JTC-3	6
Team CMS Sweden	Ford Sierra RS500	66	(Finland) Heikki Salmenautio	JTC-1	6
Team CMS Sweden	Ford Sierra RS500	66	(Sweden) Christer Simonsen	JTC-1	6
Team CMS Sweden	Ford Sierra RS500	66	(Sweden) Kurt Simonsen	JTC-1	6
Team Yamato	Honda Civic EF3	67	(Japan) Tsugio Oba	JTC-3	2, 4, 6
Team Yamato	Honda Civic EF3	67	(Japan) Katsuaki Sato	JTC-3	2, 4, 6
Team Noji	BMW M3 Sport Evolution	72	(Japan) Norio Makiguchi	JTC-2	1, 3-6
Team Noji	BMW M3 Sport Evolution	72	(Japan) Hiroyuki Noji	JTC-2	1, 3
Team Noji	BMW M3 Sport Evolution	72	(Japan) Sanshu Tanaka	JTC-2	1
Team Noji	BMW M3 Sport Evolution	72	(Japan) Tetsu Horigome	JTC-2	3-4
Team Noji	BMW M3 Sport Evolution	72	(Japan) Tetsuya Ota	JTC-2	4-5
Team Noji	BMW M3 Sport Evolution	72	(Japan) Toru Horigome	JTC-2	5-6
Kawasho	Toyota Corolla Levin AE92	88	(Japan) Takashi Onuma	JTC-3	3, 6
Kawasho	Toyota Corolla Levin AE92	88	(Japan) Shinichi Yamaji	JTC-3	3, 6
Kawasho	Toyota Corolla Levin AE92	88	(Japan) Minoru Tanaka	JTC-3	3
Kawasho	Toyota Corolla Levin AE92	88	(Japan) Tetsuya Tanaka	JTC-3	6
Moritani	Honda Civic EF9	90	(Japan) Masami Miyoshi	JTC-3	All
Moritani	Honda Civic EF9	90	(Japan) Toru Hanyu	JTC-3	1
Moritani	Honda Civic EF9	90	(Japan) Masahiko Arakawa	JTC-3	2, 6
Moritani	Honda Civic EF9	90	(Japan) Michiko Uematsu	JTC-3	2
Moritani	Honda Civic EF9	90	(Japan) Kawaji Takahashi	JTC-3	3
Moritani	Honda Civic EF9	90	(Japan) Nobuyoshi Fukuda	JTC-3	4
Moritani	Honda Civic EF9	90	(Japan) Yasufumi Yamakazi	JTC-3	5
Moritani	Honda Civic EF9	90	(Japan) Toshihiro Yoshida	JTC-3	6
Mugen Honda	Honda Civic EF9	100	(Japan) Osamu Nakako	JTC-3	All
Mugen Honda	Honda Civic EF9	100	(Japan) Hideki Okada	JTC-3	All

Icon	Class
JTC-1	over 2500cc
JTC-2	1601-2500cc
JTC-3	Up to 1600cc

== Calendar ==
Overall winner in bold.

Round	Circuit	Date	JTC-1 Winning Team	JTC-2 Winning Team	JTC-3 Winning Team
Round	Circuit	Date	JTC-1 Winning Drivers	JTC-2 Winning Drivers	JTC-3 Winning Drivers
1	(Japan) Sportsland SUGO, Miyagi	19 May	**#1 Team Impul**	#29 B-ing Kegani Racing	#25 Team Advan
1	(Japan) Sportsland SUGO, Miyagi	19 May	(Japan) **Kazuyoshi Hoshino** **(Japan) Toshio Suzuki**	(Japan) Kazuo Mogi (Japan) Sakai Obata	(Japan) Morio Nitta (Japan) Keiichi Suzuki
2	(Japan) Suzuka Circuit, Mie	7 July	**#50 Hasemi Motorsport**	#35 Auto Tech Racing	#100 Mugen Honda
2	(Japan) Suzuka Circuit, Mie	7 July	(Japan) **Masahiro Hasemi** **(Sweden) Anders Olofsson**	(Sweden) Thomas Danielsson (Austria) Roland Ratzenberger	(Japan) Osamu Nakako (Japan) Hideki Okada
3	(Japan) Tsukuba Circuit, Ibaraki	18 August	**#3 Hasemi Motorsport**	#21 Hitotsuyama Racing	#25 Team Advan
3	(Japan) Tsukuba Circuit, Ibaraki	18 August	(Japan) **Masahiro Hasemi** **(Sweden) Anders Olofsson**	(Japan) Hideo Fukuyama (Japan) Yasushi Hitotsuyama	(Japan) Morio Nitta (Japan) Keiichi Suzuki
4	(Japan) Sendai Hi-Land Raceway, Miyagi	1 September	**#1 Team Impul**	#35 Auto Tech Racing	#36 Toyota Team TOM's
4	(Japan) Sendai Hi-Land Raceway, Miyagi	1 September	(Japan) **Kazuyoshi Hoshino** **(Japan) Toshio Suzuki**	(Sweden) Thomas Danielsson (Austria) Roland Ratzenberger	(Japan) Hitoshi Ogawa (Japan) Masanori Sekiya
5	(Japan) Autopolis, Ōita	13 October	**#3 Hasemi Motorsport**	#35 Auto Tech Racing	#33 Racing Forum
5	(Japan) Autopolis, Ōita	13 October	(Japan) **Masahiro Hasemi** **(Sweden) Anders Olofsson**	(Sweden) Thomas Danielsson (Austria) Roland Ratzenberger	(Japan) Takahiko Hara (Japan) Yasuo Muramatsu
6	(Japan) Fuji Speedway, Shizuoka	10 November	**#1 Team Impul**	#26 Team Taisan	#100 Mugen Honda
6	(Japan) Fuji Speedway, Shizuoka	10 November	(Japan) **Kazuyoshi Hoshino** **(Japan) Toshio Suzuki**	(Japan) Atsushi Kawamoto (Japan) Fuminori Mizuno	(Japan) Osamu Nakako (Japan) Hideki Okada

== Championship Standings ==
Points were awarded 20, 15, 12, 10, 8, 6, 4, 3, 2, 1 to the overall top 10 as well as top 10 finishers in each class, with no bonus points for pole positions or fastest laps. All scores counted towards the championship. In cases where teammates tied on points, the driver who completed the greater distance during the season was given the higher classification.

Pos	Driver	SUG	SUZ	TSU	SEN	AUT	FUJ	Pts	Distance
1	(Japan) Masahiro Hasemi	2	1	1	2	1	4	200	Unknown
2	(Sweden) Anders Olofsson	2	1	1	2	1	4	200	Unknown
3	(Japan) Kazuyoshi Hoshino	**1**	**Ret**	**3**	**1**	**2**	**1**	174	Unknown
4	(Japan) Toshio Suzuki	**1**	**Ret**	**3**	**1**	**2**	**1**	174	Unknown
5	(Japan) Keiichi Tsuchiya	Ret	2	2	3	4	3	128	Unknown
6	(Japan) Kenji Takahashi	Ret	2	2	3	4	3	128	Unknown
7	(Austria) Roland Ratzenberger	6	4	23	5	5	8	125	Unknown
8	(Sweden) Thomas Danielsson	6	4	23	5	5	8	125	Unknown
9	(Japan) Fuminori Mizuno	5	5	6	23	11	7	103	Unknown
10	(Japan) Atsushi Kawamoto	5	5	6	23	11	7	103	Unknown
11/12	(Japan) Masahiko Kageyama	Ret	3	4	Ret	3	2	98	Unknown
11/12	(Japan) Kazuo Shimizu	Ret	3	4	Ret	3	2	98	Unknown
13	(Japan) Hideo Fukuyama	17	9	5	6	7	10	98	Unknown
14/15	(Japan) Osamu Nakako	Ret	6	13	10	Ret	9	74	Unknown
14/15	(Japan) Hideki Okada	Ret	6	13	10	Ret	9	74	Unknown
16/17	(Japan) Kazuo Mogi	4	Ret	8	7	6	24	73	Unknown
16/17	(Japan) Sakai Obata	4	Ret	8	7	6	24	73	Unknown
18	(Japan) Yasushi Hitotsuyama	DNS	9	5	DNS	7	10	71	Unknown
19/20	(Japan) Takahiko Hara	Ret	7	12	12	8	22	66	Unknown
19/20	(Japan) Yasuo Muramatsu	Ret	7	12	12	8	22	66	Unknown
21	(Japan) Mikio Hitotsuyama	17	DNS		6	7	10	56	Unknown
22/23	(Japan) Morio Nitta	7	Ret	9	18	14	Ret	56	Unknown
22/23	(Japan) Keiichi Suzuki	7	Ret	9	18	14	Ret	56	Unknown
24	(Japan) Kaoru Hoshino	12	11	18	13	13	12	53	Unknown
25	(Argentina) Víctor Rosso	12	11		13	13	12	49	Unknown
26/27	(Japan) Kiyoshi Misaki	3	Ret	16	Ret	Ret	5	48	Unknown
26/27	(Japan) Naoki Nagasaka	3	Ret	16	Ret	Ret	5	48	Unknown
28/29	(Japan) Hitoshi Ogawa	15	Ret	Ret	8	9	Ret	43	Unknown
28/29	(Japan) Masanori Sekiya	15	Ret	Ret	8	9	Ret	43	Unknown
30	(Japan) Hiroyuki Noji	16	10	DNS	9	10	Ret	42	Unknown
30	(Japan) Hiroyuki Noji	16	10	DNQ	9	10	Ret	42	Unknown
31/32	(Japan) Naoki Hattori	Ret	Ret	11	11	12	21	42	Unknown
31/32	(Japan) Akihiko Nakaya	Ret	Ret	11	11	12	21	42	Unknown
33/34	(Japan) Hisatoyo Goto	8	16	20	21	17	14	37	Unknown
33/34	(Japan) Koji Sato	8	16	20	21	17	14	37	Unknown
35	(Japan) Masami Miyoshi	13	8	14	15	Ret	20	35	Unknown
36	(Japan) Hideshi Matsuda		10		9	10	Ret	34	Unknown
37	(Japan) Norio Makiguchi	16		19	20	Ret	11	28	Unknown
38/39	(Japan) Ryu Haruki			21	4			26	Unknown
38/39	(Japan) Eiji Yamada			21	4			26	Unknown
40	(Australia) Mark Skaife						3	24	Unknown
41	(Japan) Hisashi Yokoshima	9	Ret	Ret	14	16	Ret	24	Unknown
42	(Japan) Hisashi Wada	9	Ret	Ret	14	16		24	Unknown
43	(Japan) Ryuichi Natsukawa	14	Ret	15	16		Ret	24	Unknown
44	(Japan) Masahiko Kondō	14		15	16		Ret	24	Unknown
45	(Japan) Mitsutake Koma	10	15	22	26	Ret	17	23	Unknown
46	(Japan) Satoshi Ikezawa	18	12	10				21	Unknown
47/48	(Belgium) Philippe Adams			7			19	20	Unknown
47/48	(United Kingdom) Andrew Gilbert-Scott			7			19	20	Unknown
49	(Japan) Fumio Mutoh	18	12		Ret	19	25	20	Unknown
50	(Japan) Masahiko Arakawa		8				20	19	Unknown
51	(Japan) Tomoyuki Hosono	10	15	22	DNS	Ret	Ret	17	Unknown
52	(Japan) Ryusaku Hitomi	10	DNS	DNS	26		17	17	Unknown
53/54	(Japan) Shinji Tsunashima	11	Ret	Ret	17	15	Ret	17	Unknown
53/54	(Japan) Hiroyuki Kawai	11	Ret	Ret	17	15	Ret	17	Unknown
55	(Japan) Michiko Uematsu		8					15	Unknown
56/57	(Italy) Paolo Barilla						6	12	Unknown
56/57	(Sweden) Stefan Johansson						6	12	Unknown
58/59/60	(Japan) Masahiko Hanayama						13	12	Unknown
58/59/60	(Japan) Masami Kageyama						13	12	Unknown
58/59/60	(Japan) Kumi Sato						13	12	Unknown
61	(Japan) Hironori Takeuchi			10	Ret	DNS	25	11	Unknown
62	(Japan) Toru Sawada		DNS	DNQ	DNS	10		11	Unknown
63	(Japan) Toru Horigome					Ret	11	10	Unknown
64/65	(Japan) Takeo Asano	19	Ret	17	25	20	Ret	9	Unknown
64/65	(Japan) Makoto Hagiwara	19	Ret	17	25	20	Ret	9	Unknown
66/67	(Japan) Tsugio Oba		13		22		Ret	8	Unknown
66/67	(Japan) Katsuaki Sato		13		22		Ret	8	Unknown
68/69	(Japan) Shunji Kasuya	21	14			18	Ret	8	Unknown
68/69	(Japan) Kaori Okamoto	21	14			18	Ret	8	Unknown
70	(Japan) Kawaji Takahashi			14				8	Unknown
71/72	(Japan) Takashi Onuma			Ret			15	8	Unknown
71/72	(Japan) Shinichi Yamaji			Ret			15	8	Unknown
73	(Japan) Tetsuya Tanaka						15	8	Unknown
74	(Hong Kong) Winston Mak	DNS	Ret			Ret	16	8	Unknown
75	(Japan) Eiichi Tajima		Ret			Ret	16	8	Unknown
76	(United Kingdom) James Kaye						17	6	Unknown
77	(Japan) Toshikazu Kanamori					19		6	Unknown
78	(Japan) Tetsuya Ota				20	Ret		6	Unknown
79	(Hong Kong) Kevin Wong	DNS	Ret			Ret	18	6	Unknown
80	(Japan) Takashi Ooi			Ret			18	6	Unknown
81	(Japan) Toru Hanyu	13						4	Unknown
82	(Japan) Nobuyoshi Fukuda				15			4	Unknown
83	(Japan) Takuya Kurosawa			18				4	Unknown
84	(Japan) Tetsu Horigome			19	DNS			4	Unknown
85	(Japan) Toshihiro Yoshida						20	4	Unknown
86/87/88	(Finland) Heikki Salmenautio						26	4	Unknown
86/87/88	(Sweden) Christer Simonsen						26	4	Unknown
86/87/88	(Sweden) Kurt Simonsen						26	4	Unknown
89/90	(Japan) Takeshi Kubo	20		Ret	19		Ret	2	Unknown
89/90	(Japan) Akira Shibata	20		Ret	19		Ret	2	Unknown
91/92	(Thailand) Sutthipong Samitchart						23	1	Unknown
91/92	(Thailand) Kasikam Suphot						23	1	Unknown
93/94	(Japan) Masahiro Matsunaga	22		24	24	Ret	Ret	1	Unknown
93/94	(Japan) Junko Mihara	22		24	24	Ret	Ret	1	Unknown
95	(Japan) Akihiro Higashi			Ret			27	0	Unknown
96	(Japan) Isao Shibata	DNS					27	0	Unknown
97	(Japan) Toshihiko Nogami						27	0	Unknown
NC	(Japan) Takamasa Nakagawa	DNS	Ret			Ret	Ret	0	Unknown
NC	(Hong Kong) Charles Kwan	DNS	Ret			Ret		0	Unknown
NC	(Japan) Katsutomo Kaneishi		Ret	DNS				0	Unknown
NC	(Japan) Minoru Tanaka			Ret				0	Unknown
NC	(Japan) Yasufumi Yamakazi					Ret		0	Unknown
NC	(Thailand) Prasert Aphiphunya						Ret	0	Unknown
NC	(Thailand) Kriangkrai Limnantarak						Ret	0	Unknown
NC	(Japan) Shoji Kasai	DNS						0	0.00 km
NC	(Japan) Sanshu Tanaka	DNS						0	0.00 km
NC	(Japan) Yasuo Kusakabe	DNS						0	0.00 km
Pos	Driver	SUG	SUZ	TSU	SEN	AUT	FUJ	Pts	Distance

Colour	Result
Gold	Winner
Silver	Second place
Bronze	Third place
Green	Points classification
Blue	Non-points classification
Blue	Non-classified finish (NC)
Purple	Retired, not classified (Ret)
Red	Did not qualify (DNQ)
Red	Did not pre-qualify (DNPQ)
Black	Disqualified (DSQ)
White	Did not start (DNS)
White	Withdrew (WD)
White	Race cancelled (C)
Blank	Did not practice (DNP)
Blank	Did not arrive (DNA)
Blank	Excluded (EX)

**Bold** - Pole
Italics - Fastest lap
