= 1992 Japanese Touring Car Championship =

Seasons
- ← 1991 1993 →

The 1992 Japanese Touring Car Championship season was the 8th edition of the series. It began at TI Circuit Aida on 15 March and finished after eight events at Fuji Speedway on 8 November. The championship was won by Masahiro Hasemi, driving for Hasemi Motorsport.

== Teams & Drivers ==
Team	Car	No.	Drivers	Class	Rounds
Hasemi Motorsport	Nissan BNR32 Skyline GT-R	1	(Japan) Hideo Fukuyama	JTC-1	All
Hasemi Motorsport	Nissan BNR32 Skyline GT-R	1	(Japan) Masahiro Hasemi	JTC-1	All
Team Taisan	Nissan BNR32 Skyline GT-R	2	(Japan) Kunimitsu Takahashi	JTC-1	All
Team Taisan	Nissan BNR32 Skyline GT-R	2	(Japan) Keiichi Tsuchiya	JTC-1	All
Team Taisan	BMW M3 Sport Evolution	24	(Japan) Hironori Takeuchi	JTC-2	All
Team Taisan	BMW M3 Sport Evolution	24	(Japan) Fumio Mutoh	JTC-2	1-2, 6-8
Team Taisan	BMW M3 Sport Evolution	24	(Japan) Masaki Tanaka	JTC-2	3
Team Taisan	BMW M3 Sport Evolution	24	(Japan) Motoshi Sekine	JTC-2	4-8
Team Taisan	BMW M3 Sport Evolution	26	(Japan) Fuminori Mizuno	JTC-2	All
Team Taisan	BMW M3 Sport Evolution	26	(Japan) Atsushi Kawamoto	JTC-2	1-2, 4-8
Team Taisan	BMW M3 Sport Evolution	26	(United Kingdom) Anthony Reid	JTC-2	3
Team Koyama Garage	Isuzu Gemini JT191	5	(Japan) Tsutomu Azuma	JTC-3	8
Team Koyama Garage	Isuzu Gemini JT191	5	(Japan) Akihiro Higashi	JTC-3	8
Team Koyama Garage	Isuzu Gemini JT191	5	(Japan) Isao Shibata	JTC-3	8
Unknown	Toyota Corolla Levin AE92	6	(Japan) Junko Mihara	JTC-3	2
Unknown	Honda Civic EG6	7	(Japan) Yoshio Hattori	JTC-3	8
Unknown	Honda Civic EG6	7	(Japan) Kenta Shimamura	JTC-3	8
Unknown	Honda Civic EG6	7	(Japan) Yutaka Tomii	JTC-3	8
FET Racing	Nissan BNR32 Skyline GT-R	8	(Japan) Kiyoshi Misaki	JTC-1	All
FET Racing	Nissan BNR32 Skyline GT-R	8	(Japan) Naoki Nagasaka	JTC-1	All
AP National	Honda Civic EF9	9	(Thailand) Prasert Aphiphunya	JTC-3	8
AP National	Honda Civic EF9	9	(Thailand) Kriangkrai Limnantarak	JTC-3	8
Object T	Toyota Corolla Levin AE92	11	(Japan) Hisashi Wada	JTC-3	1-2
Object T	Toyota Corolla Levin AE92	11	(Japan) Hisashi Yokoshima	JTC-3	1-2
Object T	Toyota Corolla Levin AE101	11	(Japan) Hisashi Wada	JTC-3	3-8
Object T	Toyota Corolla Levin AE101	11	(Japan) Hisashi Yokoshima	JTC-3	3-8
Object T	Nissan BNR32 Skyline GT-R	22	(Denmark) Tom Kristensen	JTC-1	All
Object T	Nissan BNR32 Skyline GT-R	22	(Japan) Kazuo Shimizu	JTC-1	All
Team Impul	Nissan BNR32 Skyline GT-R	12	(Japan) Kazuyoshi Hoshino	JTC-1	All
Team Impul	Nissan BNR32 Skyline GT-R	12	(Japan) Masahiko Kageyama	JTC-1	All
Mooncraft	Honda Civic EF9	14	(Japan) Naoki Hattori	JTC-3	1-6
Mooncraft	Honda Civic EF9	14	(Japan) Katsutomo Kaneishi	JTC-3	1-6
Mooncraft	Honda Civic EG6	14	(Japan) Naoki Hattori	JTC-3	7-8
Mooncraft	Honda Civic EG6	14	(Japan) Katsutomo Kaneishi	JTC-3	7-8
Cherena Racing Team	BMW M3 Sport Evolution	17	(Japan) Ryuichi Natsukawa	JTC-2	1, 3-8
Cherena Racing Team	BMW M3 Sport Evolution	17	(Japan) Kazuaki Takamura	JTC-2	1, 3, 5, 7
Cherena Racing Team	BMW M3 Sport Evolution	17	(Japan) Masahiko Kondō	JTC-2	4, 6, 8
Asano Racing Service	Toyota Corolla Levin AE92	18	(Japan) Takeo Asano	JTC-3	All
Asano Racing Service	Toyota Corolla Levin AE92	18	(Japan) Makoto Hagiwara	JTC-3	All
Racing Project Bandoh	Toyota Corolla Levin AE92	19	(Japan) Hiroyuki Kawai	JTC-3	1-7
Racing Project Bandoh	Toyota Corolla Levin AE92	19	(Japan) Mitsutake Koma	JTC-3	1-7
Racing Project Bandoh	Toyota Corolla Levin AE101	19	(Japan) Hiroyuki Kawai	JTC-3	8
Racing Project Bandoh	Toyota Corolla Levin AE101	19	(Japan) Mitsutake Koma	JTC-3	8
Hitotsuyama Racing	BMW M3 Sport Evolution	21	(Japan) Hideshi Matsuda	JTC-2	All
Hitotsuyama Racing	BMW M3 Sport Evolution	21	(Japan) Mikio Hitotsuyama	JTC-2	1, 3, 5, 7-8
Hitotsuyama Racing	BMW M3 Sport Evolution	21	(Japan) Yasushi Hitotsuyama	JTC-2	2, 4, 6, 8
Team Advan	Toyota Corolla Levin AE101	25	(Japan) Morio Nitta	JTC-3	2-8
Team Advan	Toyota Corolla Levin AE101	25	(Japan) Keiichi Suzuki	JTC-3	2-8
BVDR	Toyota Corolla Levin AE92	28	(Japan) Takeshi Kubo	JTC-3	3, 6-8
BVDR	Toyota Corolla Levin AE92	28	(Japan) Akira Shibata	JTC-3	3, 6-8
BVDR	Toyota Corolla Levin AE92	28	(Japan) Yasuo Kusakabe	JTC-3	7-8
B-ing Kegani Racing	BMW M3 Sport Evolution	29	(Japan) Kazuo Mogi	JTC-2	All
B-ing Kegani Racing	BMW M3 Sport Evolution	29	(Japan) Sakai Obata	JTC-2	1-3, 5-8
B-ing Kegani Racing	BMW M3 Sport Evolution	29	(Japan) Hideyuki Tamamoto	JTC-2	4
Concept L Racing Team	Honda Civic EF9	32	(Japan) Takahiko Hara	JTC-3	1-6
Concept L Racing Team	Honda Civic EF9	32	(Japan) Masami Kageyama	JTC-3	1-6
Concept L Racing Team	Honda Civic EG6	32	(Japan) Takahiko Hara	JTC-3	7-8
Concept L Racing Team	Honda Civic EG6	32	(Japan) Masami Kageyama	JTC-3	7-8
Concept L Racing Team	Honda Civic EF9	77	(Japan) Masahiko Hanayama	JTC-3	7-8
Concept L Racing Team	Honda Civic EF9	77	(Japan) Nobukazu Katsura	JTC-3	7-8
Racing Forum	Honda Civic EF9	33	(Japan) Yasuo Muramatsu	JTC-3	1-7
Racing Forum	Honda Civic EF9	33	(Japan) Kumi Sato	JTC-3	1-7
Racing Forum	Honda Civic EG6	33	(Japan) Yasuo Muramatsu	JTC-3	8
Racing Forum	Honda Civic EG6	33	(Japan) Kumi Sato	JTC-3	8
Auto Tech Racing	BMW M3 Sport Evolution	34	(Republic of Ireland) Derek Higgins	JTC-2	6, 8
Auto Tech Racing	BMW M3 Sport Evolution	34	(New Zealand) Paul Radisich	JTC-2	6, 8
Auto Tech Racing	BMW M3 Sport Evolution	35	(United Kingdom) Andrew Gilbert-Scott	JTC-2	All
Auto Tech Racing	BMW M3 Sport Evolution	35	(Austria) Roland Ratzenberger	JTC-2	All
Toyota Team TOM's	Toyota Corolla Levin AE101	36	(France) Pierre-Henri Raphanel	JTC-3	All
Toyota Team TOM's	Toyota Corolla Levin AE101	36	(Japan) Masanori Sekiya	JTC-3	All
Toyota Team TOM's	Toyota Corolla Levin AE101	37	(Japan) Kaoru Hoshino	JTC-3	All
Toyota Team TOM's	Toyota Corolla Levin AE101	37	(Argentina) Víctor Rosso	JTC-3	All
Kinku Boston	Toyota Corolla Levin AE92	39	(Japan) Tsuyoshi Mouri	JTC-3	4
Kinku Boston	Toyota Corolla Levin AE92	39	(Japan) Atsushi Okuda	JTC-3	4
Kinku Boston	Toyota Corolla Levin AE92	39	(Japan) Fuyu Takashi	JTC-3	4
Nismo	Nissan BNR32 Skyline GT-R	55	(Japan) Takayuki Kinoshita	JTC-1	All
Nismo	Nissan BNR32 Skyline GT-R	55	(Sweden) Anders Olofsson	JTC-1	All
Team Over Take	BMW M3 Sport Evolution	61	(Japan) Takamasa Nakagawa	JTC-2	All
Team Over Take	BMW M3 Sport Evolution	61	(Japan) Eiichi Tajima	JTC-2	All
Team Over Take	BMW M3 Sport Evolution	62	(Hong Kong) Kevin Wong	JTC-2	2-5, 7-8
Team Over Take	BMW M3 Sport Evolution	62	(Hong Kong) Charles Kwan	JTC-2	2, 5-6, 8
Team Over Take	BMW M3 Sport Evolution	62	(Hong Kong) Winston Mak	JTC-2	3-4, 7-8
Team Over Take	BMW M3 Sport Evolution	62	(Japan) Akira Watanabe	JTC-2	3, 6-7
Team Over Take	BMW M3 Sport Evolution	62	(Japan) Shunji Kasuya	JTC-2	4
Team Noji	BMW M3 Sport Evolution	63	(Japan) Katsunori Iketani	JTC-2	8
Team Noji	BMW M3 Sport Evolution	63	(Japan) Hiroyuki Noji	JTC-2	8
Team Noji	BMW M3 Sport Evolution	63	(Japan) Hisashi Shimura	JTC-2	8
Team Yamato	Honda Civic EF9	67	(Japan) Tsugio Oba	JTC-3	4, 7-8
Team Yamato	Honda Civic EF9	67	(Japan) Katsuaki Sato	JTC-3	4, 7-8
Team Yamato	Honda Civic EF9	67	(Japan) Masahiro Imamura	JTC-3	7-8
IPF Wako's	BMW M3 Sport Evolution	72	(Japan) Toru Horigome	JTC-2	1-4, 6-8
IPF Wako's	BMW M3 Sport Evolution	72	(Japan) Norio Makiguchi	JTC-2	1-4, 6-8
IPF Wako's	BMW M3 Sport Evolution	72	(Japan) Tetsuya Ota	JTC-2	1-4
IPF Wako's	BMW M3 Sport Evolution	72	(Japan) Seiichi Sodeyama	JTC-2	8
Unknown	Nissan BNR32 Skyline GT-R	83	(Thailand) M.V. Manitto	JTC-1	8
Unknown	Nissan BNR32 Skyline GT-R	83	(Thailand) Ratanakul Prutirat Serireongrith	JTC-1	8
Kenji HKS Racing	Nissan BNR32 Skyline GT-R	87	(Japan) Yukihiro Hane	JTC-1	1, 3-4, 6-8
Kenji HKS Racing	Nissan BNR32 Skyline GT-R	87	(Japan) Osamu Hagiwara	JTC-1	1, 3, 6-8
Kenji HKS Racing	Nissan BNR32 Skyline GT-R	87	(Japan) Shigeki Matsui	JTC-1	4
Kawasho	Toyota Corolla Levin AE101	88	(Japan) Masahiro Matsunaga	JTC-3	4, 6, 8
Kawasho	Toyota Corolla Levin AE101	88	(Japan) Junko Mihara	JTC-3	4, 6, 8
Kawasho	Toyota Corolla Levin AE101	88	(Japan) Shinichi Yamaji	JTC-3	4, 6, 8
Moritani	Honda Civic EF9	90	(Japan) Masami Miyoshi	JTC-3	All
Moritani	Honda Civic EF9	90	(Japan) Kenji Kuroki	JTC-3	1
Moritani	Honda Civic EF9	90	(Japan) Kouzi Takubo	JTC-3	2
Moritani	Honda Civic EF9	90	(Japan) Hikari Inami	JTC-3	3, 5
Moritani	Honda Civic EF9	90	(Japan) Tsutomo Hiraoka	JTC-3	4
Moritani	Honda Civic EF9	90	(Japan) Hirokazu Ebihara	JTC-3	6
Moritani	Honda Civic EF9	90	(Japan) Kenji Hongo	JTC-3	7
Moritani	Honda Civic EF9	90	(Japan) Masayoshi Nishikakinouchi	JTC-3	8
Mugen Honda	Honda Civic EF9	100	(Japan) Osamu Nakako	JTC-3	1-3
Mugen Honda	Honda Civic EF9	100	(Japan) Hideki Okada	JTC-3	1-3
Mugen Honda	Honda Civic EG6	100	(Japan) Osamu Nakako	JTC-3	4-8
Mugen Honda	Honda Civic EG6	100	(Japan) Hideki Okada	JTC-3	4-8

Icon	Class
JTC-1	over 2500cc
JTC-2	1601-2500cc
JTC-3	Up to 1600cc

== Calendar ==
Overall winner in bold.

Round	Circuit	Date	JTC-1 Winning Team	JTC-2 Winning Team	JTC-3 Winning Team
Round	Circuit	Date	JTC-1 Winning Drivers	JTC-2 Winning Drivers	JTC-3 Winning Drivers
1	(Japan) TI Circuit Aida, Okayama	15 March	**#1 Hasemi Motorsport**	#61 Team Take One	#100 Mugen Honda
1	(Japan) TI Circuit Aida, Okayama	15 March	(Japan) **Hideo Fukuyama** **(Japan) Masahiro Hasemi**	(Japan) Takamasa Nakagawa (Japan) Eiichi Tajima	(Japan) Osamu Nakako (Japan) Hideki Okada
2	(Japan) Autopolis, Ōita	26 April	**#55 Nismo**	#29 B-ing Kegani Racing	#25 Team Advan
2	(Japan) Autopolis, Ōita	26 April	(Japan) **Takayuki Kinoshita** **(Sweden) Anders Olofsson**	(Japan) Kazuo Mogi (Japan) Sakai Obata	(Japan) Morio Nitta (Japan) Keiichi Suzuki
3	(Japan) Sportsland SUGO, Miyagi	17 May	**#12 Team Impul**	#26 Team Taisan	#100 Mugen Honda
3	(Japan) Sportsland SUGO, Miyagi	17 May	(Japan) **Kazuyoshi Hoshino** **(Japan) Masahiko Kageyama**	(Japan) Fuminori Mizuno (United Kingdom) Anthony Reid	(Japan) Osamu Nakako (Japan) Hideki Okada
4	(Japan) Suzuka Circuit, Mie	5 July	**#22 Object T**	#61 Team Take One	#11 Object T
4	(Japan) Suzuka Circuit, Mie	5 July	(Denmark) **Tom Kristensen** **(Japan) Kazuo Shimizu**	(Japan) Takamasa Nakagawa (Japan) Eiichi Tajima	(Japan) Hisashi Wada (Japan) Hisashi Yokoshima
5	(Japan) Mine Central Circuit, Yamaguchi	9 August	**#1 Hasemi Motorsport**	#29 B-ing Kegani Racing	#37 Toyota Team TOM's
5	(Japan) Mine Central Circuit, Yamaguchi	9 August	(Japan) **Hideo Fukuyama** **(Japan) Masahiro Hasemi**	(Japan) Kazuo Mogi (Japan) Sakai Obata	(Japan) Kaoru Hoshino (Argentina) Víctor Rosso
6	(Japan) Tsukuba Circuit, Ibaraki	23 August	**#12 Team Impul**	#61 Team Take One	#100 Mugen Honda
6	(Japan) Tsukuba Circuit, Ibaraki	23 August	(Japan) **Kazuyoshi Hoshino** **(Japan) Masahiko Kageyama**	(Japan) Takamasa Nakagawa (Japan) Eiichi Tajima	(Japan) Osamu Nakako (Japan) Hideki Okada
7	(Japan) Sendai Hi-Land Raceway, Miyagi	20 September	**#12 Team Impul**	#35 Auto Tech Racing	#14 Mooncraft
7	(Japan) Sendai Hi-Land Raceway, Miyagi	20 September	(Japan) **Kazuyoshi Hoshino** **(Japan) Masahiko Kageyama**	(United Kingdom) Andrew Gilbert-Scott (Austria) Roland Ratzenberger	(Japan) Naoki Hattori (Japan) Katsutomo Kaneishi
8	(Japan) Fuji Speedway, Shizuoka	8 November	**#55 Nismo**	#34 Auto Tech Racing	#100 Mugen Honda
8	(Japan) Fuji Speedway, Shizuoka	8 November	(Japan) **Takayuki Kinoshita** **(Sweden) Anders Olofsson**	(Republic of Ireland) Derek Higgins (New Zealand) Paul Radisich	(Japan) Osamu Nakako (Japan) Hideki Okada

== Championship Standings ==
Points were awarded 20, 15, 12, 10, 8, 6, 4, 3, 2, 1 to the top 10 finishers in each class, with no bonus points for pole positions or fastest laps. All scores counted towards the championship. In cases where teammates tied on points, the driver who completed the greater distance during the season was given the higher classification.

Pos	Driver	AID	AUT	SUG	SUZ	MIN	TSU	SEN	FUJ	Pts	Distance
JTC-1
1	(Japan) Masahiro Hasemi	**1**	7	5	2	1	4	3	2	110	1607.56 km
2	(Japan) Hideo Fukuyama	**1**	7	5	2	1	4	3	2	110	1167.86 km
3	(Denmark) Tom Kristensen	2	2	4	1	2	5	5	3	103	1449.72 km
4	(Japan) Kazuo Shimizu	2	2	4	1	2	5	5	3	103	1322.56 km
5	(Sweden) Anders Olofsson	9	**1**	2	4	NC	3	2	1	100	1503.17 km
6	(Japan) Takayuki Kinoshita	9	**1**	2	4	NC	3	2	1	100	971.01 km
7	(Japan) Kazuyoshi Hoshino	Ret	3	**1**	**Ret**	**Ret**	**1**	**1**	**6**	78	966.81 km
8	(Japan) Masahiko Kageyama	Ret	3	**1**	**Ret**	**Ret**	**1**	**1**	**6**	78	706.64 km
9	(Japan) Keiichi Tsuchiya	4	Ret	3	3	17	2	4	17	74	1275.98 km
10	(Japan) Kunimitsu Takahashi	4	Ret	3	3	17	2	4	17	74	1116.19 km
11	(Japan) Yukihiro Hane	15		6	5		7	6	4	42	Unknown
12	(Japan) Osamu Hagiwara	15		6			7	6	4	34	Unknown
13/14	(Japan) Kiyoshi Misaki	3	Ret	7	Ret	Ret	Ret	7	5	28	Unknown
13/14	(Japan) Naoki Nagasaka	3	Ret	7	Ret	Ret	Ret	7	5	28	Unknown
15	(Japan) Shigeki Matsui				5					8	Unknown
16/17	(Thailand) M.V. Manitto								10	4	Unknown
16/17	(Thailand) Ratanakul Prutirat Serireongrith								10	4	Unknown
JTC-2
1	(Japan) Kazuo Mogi	Ret	4	9	17	3	9	9	22	92	1261.94 km
2	(Japan) Sakai Obata	Ret	4	9		3	9	9	22	88	876.81 km
3	(Japan) Eiichi Tajima	6	Ret	19	6	5	6	25	26	86	1126.24 km
4	(Japan) Takamasa Nakagawa	6	Ret	19	6	5	6	25	26	86	1120.78 km
5	(Austria) Roland Ratzenberger	Ret	5	10	7	4	13	8	Ret	85	1003.24 km
6	(United Kingdom) Andrew Gilbert-Scott	Ret	5	10	7	4	13	8	Ret	85	899.45 km
7	(Japan) Hideshi Matsuda	12	16	Ret	13	6	8	10	8	81	1358.47 km
8	(Japan) Fuminori Mizuno	13	6	8	10	Ret	15	13	27	72	1363.53 km
9	(Japan) Norio Makiguchi	Ret	8	11	12		11	11	9	62	982.29 km
10	(Japan) Atsushi Kawamoto	13	6		10	Ret	15	13	27	52	701.96 km
11	(Japan) Toru Horigome	DNS	8	11	DNS		11	11	9	52	Unknown
12	(Japan) Yasushi Hitotsuyama		16		13		8		8	44	Unknown
13	(Japan) Ryuichi Natsukawa	14		21	18	7	Ret	17	11	41	Unknown
14	(Japan) Mikio Hitotsuyama	12		Ret		6		10	DNS	37	Unknown
15	(Japan) Tetsuya Ota	Ret	8	11	12					30	Unknown
16	(Hong Kong) Kevin Wong		Ret	23	14	10		15	20	30	Unknown
17	(Japan) Kazuaki Takamura	14		21		7		17		28	Unknown
18/19	(Republic of Ireland) Derek Higgins						23		7	23	Unknown
18/19	(New Zealand) Paul Radisich						23		7	23	Unknown
20	(United Kingdom) Anthony Reid			8						20	Unknown
21	(Japan) Hironori Takeuchi	Ret	9	24	Ret	Ret	20	Ret	24	19	Unknown
22	(Hong Kong) Winston Mak			23	14			DNS	20	18	Unknown
23	(Japan) Fumio Mutoh	Ret	9				20	Ret	24	16	Unknown
24	(Japan) Masahiko Kondō				18		Ret		11	13	Unknown
25	(Japan) Seiichi Sodeyama								9	12	Unknown
26	(Japan) Akira Watanabe			23			Ret	15		10	Unknown
27	(Japan) Motoshi Sekine				Ret	Ret	20	Ret	24	8	Unknown
28	(Hong Kong) Charles Kwan		Ret			10	Ret		DNS	6	Unknown
29	(Japan) Shunji Kasuya				14					6	Unknown
30	(Japan) Hideyuki Tamamoto				17					4	Unknown
31	(Japan) Masaki Tanaka			24						3	Unknown
NC	(Japan) Katsunori Iketani								Ret	0	Unknown
NC	(Japan) Hiroyuki Noji								Ret	0	Unknown
NC	(Japan) Hisashi Shimura								Ret	0	Unknown
JTC-3
1	(Japan) Osamu Nakako	5	12	12	Ret	Ret	10	24	12	93	960.70 km
2	(Japan) Hideki Okada	5	12	12	Ret	Ret	10	24	12	93	866.19 km
3	(Japan) Naoki Hattori	8	13	18	9	Ret	24	12	13	77	1209.57 km
4	(Japan) Katsutomo Kaneishi	8	13	18	9	Ret	24	12	13	77	1077.74 km
5	(Japan) Kaoru Hoshino	Ret	14	13	19	8	21	19	Ret	60	909.49 km
6	(Argentina) Víctor Rosso	Ret	14	13	19	8	21	19	Ret	60	899.18 km
7	(Japan) Hisashi Yokoshima	16	11	17	8	Ret	16	Ret	Ret	57	862.03 km
8	(Japan) Hisashi Wada	16	11	17	8	Ret	16	Ret	Ret	57	722.19 km
9	(Japan) Masami Kageyama	Ret	Ret	16	11	12	Ret	14	14	57	897.02 km
10	(Japan) Takahiko Hara	Ret	Ret	16	11	12	Ret	14	14	57	877.36 km
11/12	(Japan) Morio Nitta		10	Ret	Ret	9	22	18	16	55	Unknown
11/12	(Japan) Keiichi Suzuki		10	Ret	Ret	9	22	18	16	55	Unknown
13/14	(France) Pierre-Henri Raphanel	11	Ret	14	Ret	15	18	16	15	52	Unknown
13/14	(Japan) Masanori Sekiya	11	Ret	14	Ret	15	18	16	15	52	Unknown
15	(Japan) Masami Miyoshi	Ret	15	22	15	13	12	22	18	50	Unknown
16/17	(Japan) Hiroyuki Kawai	7	Ret	20	16	11	Ret	20	19	48	Unknown
16/17	(Japan) Mitsutake Koma	7	Ret	20	16	11	Ret	20	19	48	Unknown
18/19	(Japan) Yasuo Muramatsu	10	17	15	Ret	14	Ret	Ret	Ret	30	Unknown
18/19	(Japan) Kumi Sato	10	17	15	Ret	14	Ret	Ret	Ret	30	Unknown
20/21	(Japan) Takeo Asano	17	DNS	25	21	16	19	Ret	Ret	17	Unknown
20/21	(Japan) Makoto Hagiwara	17	DNS	25	21	16	19	Ret	Ret	17	Unknown
22	(Japan) Hirokazu Ebihara						12			15	Unknown
23/24	(Japan) Masahiro Matsunaga				20		17		21	15	Unknown
23/24	(Japan) Shinichi Yamaji				20		17		21	15	Unknown
25/26	(Japan) Takeshi Kubo			Ret			14	Ret	25	13	Unknown
25/26	(Japan) Akira Shibata			Ret			14	Ret	25	13	Unknown
27	(Japan) Junko Mihara		DNS		DNS		17		21	11	Unknown
28	(Japan) Hikari Inami			22		13				10	Unknown
29	(Japan) Tsutomu Hiraoka				15					8	Unknown
30	(Japan) Kouzi Takubo		15							6	Unknown
31	(Japan) Masayoshi Nishikakinouchi								18	6	Unknown
32/33	(Japan) Masahiko Hanayama							21	28	4	Unknown
32/33	(Japan) Nobukazu Katsura							21	28	4	Unknown
34/35	(Japan) Tsugio Oba				22			23	Ret	4	Unknown
34/35	(Japan) Katsuaki Sato				22			23	Ret	4	Unknown
36	(Japan) Kenji Hongo							22		3	Unknown
37/38/39	(Japan) Tsutomu Azuma								23	2	Unknown
37/38/39	(Japan) Akihiro Higashi								23	2	Unknown
37/38/39	(Japan) Isao Shibata								23	2	Unknown
40/41/42	(Japan) Tsuyoshi Mouri				23					1	Unknown
40/41/42	(Japan) Atsushi Okuda				23					1	Unknown
40/41/42	(Japan) Fuyu Takashi				23					1	Unknown
43	(Japan) Yasuo Kusakabe							Ret	25	1	Unknown
NC	(Japan) Masahiro Imamura							DNS	Ret	0	Unknown
NC	(Japan) Kenji Kuroki	Ret								0	Unknown
NC	(Japan) Yoshio Hattori								Ret	0	Unknown
NC	(Japan) Kenta Shimamura								Ret	0	Unknown
NC	(Japan) Yutaka Tomii								Ret	0	Unknown
NC	(Thailand) Prasert Aphihanya								DNS	0	0.00 km
NC	(Thailand) Kurienkurai Limnantharak								DNS	0	0.00 km
Pos	Driver	AID	AUT	SUG	SUZ	MIN	TSU	SEN	FUJ	Pts	Distance

Colour	Result
Gold	Winner
Silver	Second place
Bronze	Third place
Green	Points classification
Blue	Non-points classification
Blue	Non-classified finish (NC)
Purple	Retired, not classified (Ret)
Red	Did not qualify (DNQ)
Red	Did not pre-qualify (DNPQ)
Black	Disqualified (DSQ)
White	Did not start (DNS)
White	Withdrew (WD)
White	Race cancelled (C)
Blank	Did not practice (DNP)
Blank	Did not arrive (DNA)
Blank	Excluded (EX)

**Bold** - Pole
Italics - Fastest lap
