= 1993 Japanese Touring Car Championship =

Seasons
- ← 1992 1994 →

The 1993 Japanese Touring Car Championship season was the 9th edition of the series and the last to be run under Group A regulations. It began at Mine Central Circuit on 14 March and finished after nine events at Fuji Speedway on 31 October. The championship was won by Masahiko Kageyama, driving for Team Impul.

== Teams & Drivers ==
Team	Car	No.	Drivers	Class	Rounds
Hasemi Motorsport	Nissan BNR32 Skyline GT-R	1	(Japan) Hideo Fukuyama	JTC-1	All
Hasemi Motorsport	Nissan BNR32 Skyline GT-R	1	(Japan) Masahiro Hasemi	JTC-1	All
Team Taisan	Nissan BNR32 Skyline GT-R	2	(Japan) Kunimitsu Takahashi	JTC-1	All
Team Taisan	Nissan BNR32 Skyline GT-R	2	(Japan) Keiichi Tsuchiya	JTC-1	All
Team Taisan	BMW M3 Sport Evolution	26	(Japan) Fuminori Mizuno	JTC-2	1-4, 6, 8-9
Team Taisan	BMW M3 Sport Evolution	26	(Japan) Kazuo Mogi	JTC-2	1-4, 6, 8-9
Team 5Zigen	Toyota Corolla Levin AE101	5	(Finland) Mika Salo	JTC-3	All
Team 5Zigen	Toyota Corolla Levin AE101	5	(Japan) Masayoshi Nishikakinouchi	JTC-3	1-5
Team 5Zigen	Toyota Corolla Levin AE101	5	(Japan) Minoru Tanaka	JTC-3	6-9
Unknown	Isuzu Gemini JT191	7	(Japan) Akihiko Saka	JTC-3	3
Unknown	Isuzu Gemini JT191	7	(Japan) Minoru Tanaka	JTC-3	3
FET Racing	Nissan BNR32 Skyline GT-R	8	(Japan) Kiyoshi Misaki	JTC-1	All
FET Racing	Nissan BNR32 Skyline GT-R	8	(Japan) Naoki Nagasaka	JTC-1	All
Object T	Nissan BNR32 Skyline GT-R	11	(Denmark) Tom Kristensen	JTC-1	All
Object T	Nissan BNR32 Skyline GT-R	11	(Japan) Hisashi Yokoshima	JTC-1	All
Team Impul	Nissan BNR32 Skyline GT-R	12	(Japan) Masahiko Kageyama	JTC-1	All
Team Impul	Nissan BNR32 Skyline GT-R	12	(Japan) Kazuyoshi Hoshino	JTC-1	1-2, 4-9
Team Impul	Nissan BNR32 Skyline GT-R	12	(Sweden) Anders Olofsson	JTC-1	3
Mooncraft	Honda Civic EG6	14	(Japan) Naoki Hattori	JTC-3	All
Mooncraft	Honda Civic EG6	14	(Japan) Katsutomo Kaneishi	JTC-3	All
Asano Racing Service	Toyota Corolla Levin AE92	18	(Japan) Takeo Asano	JTC-3	1, 3-4, 6-9
Asano Racing Service	Toyota Corolla Levin AE92	18	(Japan) Makoto Hagiwara	JTC-3	1, 3-4, 6-9
Racing Project Bandoh	Toyota Corolla Levin AE101	19	(Japan) Hiroyuki Kawai	JTC-3	All
Racing Project Bandoh	Toyota Corolla Levin AE101	19	(Japan) Mitsutake Koma	JTC-3	1, 3, 5-9
Racing Project Bandoh	Toyota Corolla Levin AE101	19	(Japan) Tomoyuki Hosono	JTC-3	2, 9
Racing Project Bandoh	Toyota Corolla Levin AE101	19	(United Kingdom) James Kaye	JTC-3	4
Hitotsuyama Racing	BMW M3 Sport Evolution	21	(Japan) Takayuki Kinoshita	JTC-2	1, 3-9
Hitotsuyama Racing	BMW M3 Sport Evolution	21	(Japan) Yasushi Hitotsuyama	JTC-2	2, 4, 6-7, 9
Hitotsuyama Racing	BMW M3 Sport Evolution	21	(Sweden) Anders Olofsson	JTC-2	2
Hitotsuyama Racing	BMW M3 Sport Evolution	21	(Japan) Mikio Hitotsuyama	JTC-2	1, 3, 5, 8
Hitotsuyama Racing	BMW M3 Sport Evolution	22	(Japan) Mikio Hitotsuyama	JTC-2	9
Hitotsuyama Racing	BMW M3 Sport Evolution	22	(Japan) Fumio Mutoh	JTC-2	9
Team Advan	Toyota Corolla Levin AE101	25	(Japan) Morio Nitta	JTC-3	All
Team Advan	Toyota Corolla Levin AE101	25	(Japan) Keiichi Suzuki	JTC-3	All
Asahi Kiko Sport Team	BMW M3 Sport Evolution	27	(Japan) Atsushi Kawamoto	JTC-2	All
Asahi Kiko Sport Team	BMW M3 Sport Evolution	27	(United Kingdom) Anthony Reid	JTC-2	All
Unknown	Toyota Corolla Levin AE101	28	(Japan) Akira Shibata	JTC-3	9
Unknown	Toyota Corolla Levin AE101	28	(Japan) Yusaku Shibata	JTC-3	9
Concept L Racing Team	Honda Civic EG6	32	(Japan) Takahiko Hara	JTC-3	1, 3-9
Concept L Racing Team	Honda Civic EG6	32	(Japan) Masami Kageyama	JTC-3	1, 3-9
Concept L Racing Team	Honda Civic EG6	77	(Japan) Nobukazu Katsura	JTC-3	1
Concept L Racing Team	Honda Civic EG6	77	(Japan) Kumi Sato	JTC-3	1
Concept L Racing Team	Honda Civic Ferio EG9	77	(Japan) Shinichi Katsura	JTC-3	3-9
Concept L Racing Team	Honda Civic Ferio EG9	77	(Japan) Masahiko Hanayama	JTC-3	3, 8-9
Concept L Racing Team	Honda Civic Ferio EG9	77	(Japan) Kumi Sato	JTC-3	4-7
Racing Forum	Honda Civic EG6	33	(Japan) Kazuo Shimizu	JTC-3	1, 3-9
Racing Forum	Honda Civic EG6	33	(Japan) Yasuo Muramatsu	JTC-3	1-6, 9
Racing Forum	Honda Civic EG6	33	(Japan) Toshihiro Yoshida	JTC-3	2, 7-8
Auto Tech Racing	BMW M3 Sport Evolution	35	(United Kingdom) Andrew Gilbert-Scott	JTC-2	All
Auto Tech Racing	BMW M3 Sport Evolution	35	(Japan) Akihiko Nakaya	JTC-2	All
Toyota Team TOM's	Toyota Corolla Levin AE101	36	(France) Pierre-Henri Raphanel	JTC-3	All
Toyota Team TOM's	Toyota Corolla Levin AE101	36	(Japan) Masanori Sekiya	JTC-3	All
Toyota Team TOM's	Toyota Corolla Levin AE101	37	(Japan) Kaoru Hoshino	JTC-3	All
Toyota Team TOM's	Toyota Corolla Levin AE101	37	(Japan) Tetsuya Tanaka	JTC-3	All
Nismo	Nissan BNR32 Skyline GT-R	55	(Japan) Akira Iida	JTC-1	All
Nismo	Nissan BNR32 Skyline GT-R	55	(Japan) Toshio Suzuki	JTC-1	All
Team Take One	BMW M3 Sport Evolution	61	(Sweden) Thomas Danielsson	JTC-2	All
Team Take One	BMW M3 Sport Evolution	61	(Japan) Eiichi Tajima	JTC-2	All
Team Take One	BMW M3 Sport Evolution	62	(Hong Kong) Kevin Wong	JTC-2	1, 3-6, 8-9
Team Take One	BMW M3 Sport Evolution	62	(Hong Kong) Charles Kwan	JTC-2	1, 3-4, 6, 9
Team Take One	BMW M3 Sport Evolution	62	(Hong Kong) Winston Mak	JTC-2	5, 8-9
Team Yamato	Honda Civic EF9	67	(Japan) Tsugio Oba	JTC-3	4, 8-9
Team Yamato	Honda Civic EF9	67	(Japan) Katsuaki Sato	JTC-3	4, 8-9
Team Yamato	Honda Civic EF9	67	(Japan) Masahiro Imamura	JTC-3	9
IPF Wako's	BMW M3 Sport Evolution	72	(Japan) Norio Makiguchi	JTC-2	All
IPF Wako's	BMW M3 Sport Evolution	72	(Japan) Hideshi Matsuda	JTC-2	All
HKS Racing Co. Ltd.	Nissan BNR32 Skyline GT-R	87	(Japan) Osamu Hagiwara	JTC-1	All
HKS Racing Co. Ltd.	Nissan BNR32 Skyline GT-R	87	(Japan) Yukihiro Hane	JTC-1	All
Mugen Honda	Honda Civic EG6	100	(Japan) Osamu Nakako	JTC-3	All
Mugen Honda	Honda Civic EG6	100	(Japan) Hideki Okada	JTC-3	All

Icon	Class
JTC-1	over 2500cc
JTC-2	1601-2500cc
JTC-3	Up to 1600cc

== Calendar ==
Overall winner in bold.

Round	Circuit	Date	JTC-1 Winning Team	JTC-2 Winning Team	JTC-3 Winning Team
Round	Circuit	Date	JTC-1 Winning Drivers	JTC-2 Winning Drivers	JTC-3 Winning Drivers
1	(Japan) Mine Central Circuit, Yamaguchi	14 March	**#12 Team Impul**	#35 Auto Tech Racing	#100 Mugen Honda
1	(Japan) Mine Central Circuit, Yamaguchi	14 March	(Japan) **Kazuyoshi Hoshino** **(Japan) Masahiko Kageyama**	(United Kingdom) Andrew Gilbert-Scott (Japan) Akihiko Nakaya	(Japan) Osamu Nakako (Japan) Hideki Okada
2	(Japan) Autopolis, Ōita	25 April	**#2 Team Taisan**	#35 Auto Tech Racing	#14 Mooncraft
2	(Japan) Autopolis, Ōita	25 April	(Japan) **Kunimitsu Takahashi** **(Japan) Keiichi Tsuchiya**	(United Kingdom) Andrew Gilbert-Scott (Japan) Akihiko Nakaya	(Japan) Naoki Hattori (Japan) Katsutomo Kaneishi
3	(Japan) Sportsland SUGO, Miyagi	16 May	**#87 HKS Racing Co. Ltd.**	#35 Auto Tech Racing	#100 Mugen Honda
3	(Japan) Sportsland SUGO, Miyagi	16 May	(Japan) **Yukihiro Hane** **(Japan) Osamu Hagiwara**	(United Kingdom) Andrew Gilbert-Scott (Japan) Akihiko Nakaya	(Japan) Osamu Nakako (Japan) Hideki Okada
4	(Japan) Suzuka Circuit, Mie	4 July	**#1 Hasemi Motorsport**	#35 Auto Tech Racing	#14 Mooncraft
4	(Japan) Suzuka Circuit, Mie	4 July	(Japan) **Masahiro Hasemi** **(Japan) Hideo Fukuyama**	(United Kingdom) Andrew Gilbert-Scott (Japan) Akihiko Nakaya	(Japan) Naoki Hattori (Japan) Katsutomo Kaneishi
5	(Japan) TI Circuit Aida, Okayama	8 August	**#12 Team Impul**	#27 Asahi Kiko Sport Team	#14 Mooncraft
5	(Japan) TI Circuit Aida, Okayama	8 August	(Japan) **Kazuyoshi Hoshino** **(Japan) Masahiko Kageyama**	(United Kingdom) Anthony Reid (Japan) Atsushi Kawamoto	(Japan) Naoki Hattori (Japan) Katsutomo Kaneishi
6	(Japan) Tsukuba Circuit, Ibaraki	22 August	**#55 Nismo**	#72 IPF Wako's	#5 Team 5Zigen
6	(Japan) Tsukuba Circuit, Ibaraki	22 August	(Japan) **Toshio Suzuki** **(Japan) Akira Iida**	(Japan) Norio Makiguchi (Japan) Hideshi Matsuda	(Finland) Mika Salo (Japan) Minoru Tanaka
7	(Japan) Tokachi International Speedway, Hokkaidō	19 September	**#12 Team Impul**	#35 Auto Tech Racing	#100 Mugen Honda
7	(Japan) Tokachi International Speedway, Hokkaidō	19 September	(Japan) **Kazuyoshi Hoshino** **(Japan) Masahiko Kageyama**	(United Kingdom) Andrew Gilbert-Scott (Japan) Akihiko Nakaya	(Japan) Osamu Nakako (Japan) Hideki Okada
8	(Japan) Sendai Hi-Land Raceway, Miyagi	10 October	**#12 Team Impul**	#61 Team Take One	#32 Concept L Racing Team
8	(Japan) Sendai Hi-Land Raceway, Miyagi	10 October	(Japan) **Kazuyoshi Hoshino** **(Japan) Masahiko Kageyama**	(Sweden) Thomas Danielsson (Japan) Eiichi Tajima	(Japan) Masami Kageyama (Japan) Takahiko Hara
9	(Japan) Fuji Speedway, Shizuoka	31 October	**#11 Object T**	#26 Team Taisan	#14 Mooncraft
9	(Japan) Fuji Speedway, Shizuoka	31 October	(Japan) **Hisashi Yokoshima** **(Denmark) Tom Kristensen**	(Japan) Kazuo Mogi (Japan) Fuminori Mizuno	(Japan) Naoki Hattori (Japan) Katsutomo Kaneishi

== Championship Standings ==
Points were awarded 20, 15, 12, 10, 8, 6, 4, 3, 2, 1 to the top 10 finishers in each class, with no bonus points for pole positions or fastest laps. All scores counted towards the championship. In cases where teammates tied on points, the driver who completed the greater distance during the season was given the higher classification.

Pos	Driver	MIN	AUT	SUG	SUZ	AID	TSU	TOK	SEN	FUJ	Pts	Distance
JTC-1
1	(Japan) Masahiko Kageyama	1	**3**	2	3	**1**	2	**1**	**1**	**Ret**	134	1197.83 km
2	(Japan) Kazuyoshi Hoshino	1	**3**		3	**1**	2	**1**	**1**	**Ret**	119	1264.75 km
3	(Japan) Toshio Suzuki	14	5	3	**5**	2	1	2	18	3	106	1821.88 km
4	(Japan) Akira Iida	14	5	3	**5**	2	1	2	18	3	106	1227.09 km
5	(Japan) Hisashi Yokoshima	3	2	Ret	4	3	3	7	5	1	95	1412.22 km
6	(Denmark) Tom Kristensen	3	2	Ret	4	3	3	7	5	1	95	1368.53 km
7	(Japan) Masahiro Hasemi	2	4	4	1	4	5	5	Ret	5	89	1547.49 km
8	(Japan) Hideo Fukuyama	2	4	4	1	4	5	5	Ret	5	89	1237.04 km
9	(Japan) Yukihiro Hane	9	Ret	**1**	19	Ret	**9**	3	2	4	79	1347.92 km
10	(Japan) Osamu Hagiwara	9	Ret	**1**	19	Ret	**9**	3	2	4	79	1055.47 km
11/12	(Japan) Kunimitsu Takahashi	**Ret**	1	Ret	2	5	4	6	Ret	Ret	59	Unknown
11/12	(Japan) Keiichi Tsuchiya	**Ret**	1	Ret	2	5	4	6	Ret	Ret	59	Unknown
13/14	(Japan) Kiyoshi Misaki	Ret	Ret	5	Ret	Ret	16	4	3	2	49	Unknown
13/14	(Japan) Naoki Nagasaka	Ret	Ret	5	Ret	Ret	16	4	3	2	49	Unknown
15	(Sweden) Anders Olofsson			2							15	Unknown
JTC-2
1	(United Kingdom) Andrew Gilbert-Scott	4	6	6	6	7	7	8	22	NC	134	1266.89 km
2	(Japan) Akihiko Nakaya	4	6	6	6	7	7	8	22	NC	134	1229.69 km
3	(United Kingdom) Anthony Reid	10	7	9	16	6	8	9	7	7	117	1741.00 km
4	(Japan) Atsushi Kawamoto	10	7	9	16	6	8	9	7	7	117	1217.47 km
5	(Japan) Hideshi Matsuda	5	17	7	7	8	6	Ret	6	17	106	1585.64 km
6	(Japan) Norio Makiguchi	5	17	7	7	8	6	Ret	6	17	106	1059.44 km
7	(Japan) Kazuo Mogi	18	9	11	8		Ret		8	6	68	1036.57 km
8	(Japan) Fuminori Mizuno	18	9	11	8		Ret		8	6	68	1028.38 km
9	(Japan) Takayuki Kinoshita	Ret		13	12	9	10	15	9	11	66	1342.22 km
10	(Sweden) Thomas Danielsson	17	10	8	Ret	Ret	15	Ret	4	19	60	940.70 km
11	(Japan) Eiichi Tajima	17	10	8	Ret	Ret	15	Ret	4	19	60	Unknown
12	(Japan) Yasushi Hitotsuyama		8		12		10	15		11	54	Unknown
13	(Hong Kong) Kevin Wong	Ret		17	11	Ret	12		21	15	38	Unknown
14	(Hong Kong) Charles Kwan	Ret		17	11		12			15	32	Unknown
15	(Japan) Mikio Hitotsuyama	Ret		13		9			9	18	30	Unknown
16	(Hong Kong) Winston Mak					Ret			21	15	16	Unknown
17	(Sweden) Anders Olofsson		8								12	Unknown
18	(Japan) Fumio Mutoh									18	6	Unknown
JTC-3
1	(Japan) Naoki Hattori	Ret	11	14	9	10	Ret	14	12	8	112	1186.88 km
2	(Japan) Katsutomo Kaneishi	Ret	11	14	9	10	Ret	14	12	8	112	1174.42 km
3	(Japan) Osamu Nakako	6	13	10	18	11	19	10	13	20	110	1418.07 km
4	(Japan) Hideki Okada	6	13	10	18	11	19	10	13	20	110	1347.85 km
5	(Japan) Morio Nitta	8	14	15	10	17	17	Ret	11	9	90	1354.38 km
6	(Japan) Keiichi Suzuki	8	14	15	10	17	17	Ret	11	9	90	1233.44 km
7	(France) Pierre-Henri Raphanel	7	12	20	DSQ	12	14	Ret	14	Ret	65	935.62 km
8	(Japan) Masanori Sekiya	7	12	20	DSQ	12	14	Ret	14	Ret	65	760.62 km
9	(Japan) Hiroyuki Kawai	19	18	16	14	13	18	11	15	Ret	63	1179.40 km
10	(Japan) Shinichi Katsura	13		21	15	15	13	13	17	13	58	1415.76 km
11/12	(Japan) Masami Kageyama	Ret		12	13	18	Ret	Ret	10	Ret	49	Unknown
11/12	(Japan) Takahiko Hara	Ret		12	13	18	Ret	Ret	10	Ret	49	Unknown
13	(Japan) Mitsutake Koma	19		16		13	18	11	15	Ret	49	Unknown
14	(Finland) Mika Salo	16	15	18	Ret	Ret	11	Ret	Ret	12	47	Unknown
15	(Japan) Kumi Sato	13			15	15	13	13			45	Unknown
16	(Japan) Kazuo Shimizu	12		19	Ret	14	Ret	12	16	Ret	36	Unknown
17	(Japan) Minoru Tanaka			DNS			11	Ret	Ret	12	28	Unknown
18/19	(Japan) Tetsuya Tanaka	11	Ret	23	DSQ	16	Ret	Ret	Ret	10	26	Unknown
18/19	(Japan) Kaoru Hoshino	11	Ret	23	DSQ	16	Ret	Ret	Ret	10	26	Unknown
20	(Japan) Yasuo Muramatsu	12	16	19	Ret	14	Ret			Ret	26	Unknown
21	(Japan) Toshihiro Yoshida		16					12	16		22	Unknown
22	(Japan) Masayoshi Nishikakinouchi	16	15	18	Ret	Ret					17	Unknown
23	(Japan) Masahiko Hanayama			21					17	13	13	Unknown
24/25	(Japan) Takeo Asano	15		22	20		Ret	Ret	20	16	13	Unknown
24/25	(Japan) Makoto Hagiwara	15		22	20		Ret	Ret	20	16	13	Unknown
26	(United Kingdom) James Kaye				14						8	Unknown
27/28	(Japan) Katsuaki Sato				17				19	Ret	8	Unknown
27/28	(Japan) Tsugio Oba				17				19	Ret	8	Unknown
29/30	(Japan) Akira Shibata									14	6	Unknown
29/30	(Japan) Yusaku Shibata									14	6	Unknown
31	(Japan) Tomoyuki Hosono		18							Ret	4	Unknown
NC	(Japan) Masahiro Imamura									Ret	0	Unknown
NC	(Japan) Akihiko Saka			DNS							0	0.00 km
Pos	Driver	MIN	AUT	SUG	SUZ	AID	TSU	TOK	SEN	FUJ	Pts	Distance

Colour	Result
Gold	Winner
Silver	Second place
Bronze	Third place
Green	Points classification
Blue	Non-points classification
Blue	Non-classified finish (NC)
Purple	Retired, not classified (Ret)
Red	Did not qualify (DNQ)
Red	Did not pre-qualify (DNPQ)
Black	Disqualified (DSQ)
White	Did not start (DNS)
White	Withdrew (WD)
White	Race cancelled (C)
Blank	Did not practice (DNP)
Blank	Did not arrive (DNA)
Blank	Excluded (EX)

**Bold** - Pole
Italics - Fastest lap
