= Kazuo Mogi =

Japanese racing driver

- Nationality: Japanese
- Born: 2 February 1953 (age 73) Itako, Ibaraki, Japan

Previous series
- 1983–1990 1985–1996 1988, 1990 1994–1997: All Japan Endurance Championship; Japanese Touring Car Championship; Japanese Formula 3000 Championship; All Japan Grand Touring Car Championship

Championship titles
- 1985, 1989, 1992 1987: Japanese Touring Car Championship; All Japan Endurance Championship

Kazuo Mogi (茂木 和男, Mogi Kazuo; born 2 February 1953) is a retired Japanese racing driver.

== Racing career ==
Mogi first began professional competition in 1975, driving a Nissan Sunny. He competed in the FJ1600 Championship, joining midway through 1980, driving a West 80J; he would later participate in the Japanese Formula 3000 Championship and the All Japan Endurance Championship, but it was the Japanese Touring Car Championship where he is most well known.

Mogi is a three-time Japanese Touring Car champion, winning the title in 1985, 1989 and 1992. Mogi also won the 1987 All Japan Sports Prototype Car Endurance Championship with Kunimitsu Takahashi in a Porsche 962C. In 1992, Mogi tested the HKS 300E V12 engine intended for use in Formula One in a stretched Lola T91/50 chassis.

Mogi then competed in the All Japan Grand Touring Car Championship from 1994 before retiring from racing in 1997.

== Racing record ==
=== Complete Japanese Formula 3000 results ===
(key) (Races in bold indicate pole position) (Races in italics indicate fastest lap)

Year	Team	Chassis	Engine	1	2	3	4	5	6	7	8	9	10	DC	Points
1988	SICS Racing Team	March 88B Lola T88/50	Cosworth DFV 3.0 V8	SUZ; Ret	FUJ; 10	MIN; Ret	SUZ; 11	SUG; Ret	FUJ; Ret	SUZ; 15	SUZ; 11			NC	0
1990	Zoom Racing	Lola T89/50 Lola T90/50	Cosworth DFV 3.0 V8	SUZ	FUJ; Ret	MIN	SUZ; 10	SUG; 23	FUJ; 15	FUJ; 8	SUZ; DNQ	FUJ; DNQ	SUZ; DNQ	NC	0

=== Complete JSPC results ===
(key) (Races in bold indicate pole position) (Races in italics indicate fastest lap)

Year	Team	Co-driver(s)	Car	Class	1	2	3	4	5	6	DC	Points
1983	MO Racing	(Japan) Hiroyuki Ono	Mazda RX-7	B	SUZ; Ret	SUZ	FUJ				NC	0
1985	Auto Beaurex Motorsport	(Japan) Toshio Motohashi	Lotec M1C	C1	SUZ; 6	FUJ; Ret	FUJ; 9	SUZ; 9	FUJ; 14	FUJ; Ret	27th	8
1986	Auto Beaurex Motorsport	(Japan) Toshio Motohashi (Japan) Hideshi Matsuda (Japan) Naoki Nagasaka (United Kingdom) Will Hoy	TOM'S 85C	C1	SUZ; 7	FUJ; DNS	FUJ; Ret	SUZ; Ret	FUJ; 14	FUJ; Ret	39th	4
1987	ADVAN Alpha Nova	(Japan) Kunimitsu Takahashi (United Kingdom) Kenny Acheson	Porsche 962C	C1	SUZ; 2	FUJ; 3	FUJ; 1	SUZ; 3	FUJ; 11	FUJ; 1	**1st**	**59**
1988	ADVAN Alpha Nova	(Japan) Kunimitsu Takahashi	Porsche 962C	C1	FUJ; 3	SUZ; Ret	FUJ; 2	FUJ; Ret	SUZ; 2	FUJ; 6	4th	48
1989	Ba-Tsu ADVAN Alpha Tomei	(Japan) Kenji Takahashi (Italy) Giovanni Lavaggi	Porsche 962C	C1	FUJ; 9	FUJ; 10	FUJ; Ret	SUZ; Ret	FUJ; 10		?	?
1990	ADVAN Alpha Nova	(Japan) Kunimitsu Takahashi	Porsche 962C	C1	FUJ; 8	FUJ; C	FUJ; 5	SUZ; Ret	SUG; 6	FUJ; Ret	22nd	9

=== Complete Japanese Touring Car Championship Results ===
(key) (Races in bold indicate pole position) (Races in italics indicate fastest lap)

Year	Team	Class	Car	1	2	3	4	5	6	7	8	9	10	11	12	13	14	15	16	17	18	DC	Points
1985	Auto Beaurex Motorsport	BMW 635CSi	DIV.3	SUG; Ret	TSU; 1	MIN; 1	SUZ; 4	FUJ; 3														**1st**	**97**
1986	Auto Beaurex Motorsport	BMW 635CSi	DIV.3	MIN; 2	SUG; 11	TSU; Ret	SEN; 14	FUJ; 8	SUZ; 3													?	?
1987	Tsuchiya Engineering	Toyota Corolla FX	DIV.1	MIN; 13	SEN; 2	TSU; 4	SUG; 2	FUJ; Ret	SUZ; 4													?	?
1988	TOM'S Minolta	Toyota Corolla FX	JTC-3	SUZ; 6	MIN	SEN	TSU	SUG	FUJ													?	?
1988	Tsuchiya Engineering	Toyota Corolla FX	JTC-3	SUZ	MIN; 9	SEN	TSU	SUG	FUJ													?	?
1988	Tsuchiya Engineering	Toyota Corolla Levin	JTC-3	SUZ	MIN	SEN; 2	TSU; 8	SUG; 4	FUJ; Ret													?	?
1989	Team ADVAN	Toyota Corolla Levin	JTC-3	NIS; 6	SEN; 1	TSU; 7	SUG; 2	SUZ; 3	FUJ; 1													**1st**	?
1990	FET Racing	Ford Sierra RS500 Cosworth	JTC-1	MIN; 6	SUG; 4	SUZ; 3	TSU; 14	SEN; 7	FUJ; 21													16th	72
1991	B‐ing Kegani Racing	BMW M3 (E30)	JTC-2	SUG; 1	SUZ; Ret	TSU; 4	SEN; 3	AUT; 2	FUJ; 8													4th	73
1992	B‐ing Kegani Racing	BMW M3 (E30)	JTC-2	TAI; Ret	AUT; 1	SUG; 2	SUZ	MIN; 1	TSU; 3	SEN; 2	FUJ; 6											**1st**	**92**
1993	Team Taisan	BMW M3 (E30)	JTC-2	MIN; 5	AUT; 4	SUG; 5	SUZ; 3	TIA	TSU; Ret	TOK	SEN; 4	FUJ; 1										7th	68
1994	Team Taisan	BMW 318i	JTCC	AUT1; 12	AUT2; 18	SUG1; Ret	SUG2; DNS	TOK1; DNS	TOK2; Ret	SUZ1; 14	SUZ2; 12	MIN1; 15	MIN2; Ret	TIA1; 11	TIA2; Ret	TSU1; 11	TSU2; 8	SEN1; Ret	SEN2; DNS	FUJ1; DNS	FUJ1; NC	28th	3
1995	Team ADVAN Yamaichi	BMW 318i	JTCC	FUJ1; 15	FUJ2; 18	SUG1; 20	SUG2; DNS	TOK1; 14	TOK2; 19	SUZ1; 11	SUZ2; Ret	MIN1; Ret	MIN2; Ret	TIA1; 22	TIA2; Ret	SEN1; 17	SEN2; 19	FUJ1; Ret	FUJ2; 24			30th	0
1996	Team ADVAN with MOGG	BMW 318i	JTCC	FUJ1; DNS	FUJ2; DNS	SUG1	SUG2	SUZ1	SUZ2	MIN1	MIN2	SEN1	SEN2	TOK1	TOK2	FUJ1	FUJ2					NC	0

=== Complete JGTC results ===
(key) (Races in bold indicate pole position) (Races in italics indicate fastest lap)

Year	Team	Car	Class	1	2	3	4	5	6	DC	Points
1994	Team Taisan	Porsche 962C	GT1	**FUJ**; Ret	SEN	FUJ	SUG	MIN		NC	0
1996	Cobra Racing Team	Porsche 911 RSR	GT300	SUZ; 2	FUJ; 7	SEN; Ret	FUJ; Ret	SUG; 3	MIN; 2	5th	46
1997	Team Take One	Porsche 911 RSR	GT500	SUZ; 9	FUJ; Ret	SEN; 12	FUJ; 12	MIN; 11	SUG; 9	26th	4
