= Kenji Takahashi (racing driver) =

Japanese racing driver (1946–2005)

- Nationality: Japanese
- Born: 18 May 1946 Tokyo, Japan
- Died: 1 January 2005 (aged 58)

Previous series
- 1974–1976 1976–1986 1984–1990 1986–1991 1996–1997: FJ1300 Championship; All-Japan Formula Two Championship; All Japan Endurance Championship; Japanese Touring Car Championship; All Japan Grand Touring Car Championship

Championship titles
- 1985–1986 1990: All Japan Endurance Championship; Japanese Touring Car Championship
24 Hours of Le Mans career
- Years: 1987
- Teams: NISMO
- Best finish: DNF (1987)
- Class wins: 0

Kenji Takahashi (高橋 健二, Takahashi Kenji; 18 May 1946 – 1 January 2005) was a Japanese racing driver.

== Racing career ==
Takahashi began his racing career in 1969, driving a Datsun Sports in Minor Touring, a companion championship to the Fuji Grand Champion Series; he also raced a Nissan Fairlady Z and Sunny Coupe in these championships and winning a championship in the Sunny.

Takahashi was most commonly associated with the ADVAN brand of tires; he would most often be found racing a Porsche 956 or 962 alongside compatriot Kunimitsu Takahashi (no relation), usually with ADVAN branding. Takahashi won the 1985 and 1986 All Japan Endurance Championships as well as the 1990 Japanese Touring Car Championship; he is a two-time winner of the Suzuka 1000 km. Takahashi retired from racing in 1997.

Throughout its development, Takahashi was the lead development driver for the Skyline GT-R.

Takahashi died of liver cirrhosis on 1 January 2005; he was 58 years old. Kunimitsu Takahashi, a close friend, eulogized him at his funeral.

== Racing record ==
=== Complete FJ1300 results ===
(key) (Races in bold indicate pole position) (Races in italics indicate fastest lap)

Year	Chassis	1	2	3	4	5	6	7	8	DC	Points
1974	March 733	SUZ	FUJ; 1	SUZ; 6	SUZ	SUZ	SUZ			?	?
1975	March 733	SUZ	SUZ; 3	SUZ; 2	FUJ	FUJ				?	?
1975	Alpine A364						MIN; 3	SUZ; Ret	SUZ	?	?
1976	March 733	SUZ	FUJ	SUZ; 2	SUZ	SUZ				?	?

=== Complete All-Japan Formula 2000/Formula Two results ===
(key) (Races in bold indicate pole position) (Races in italics indicate fastest lap)

Year	Team	Chassis	Engine	Tire	1	2	3	4	5	6	7	8	DC	Points
1976	Murakami & Co. Tomei Jidosha	March 742	BMW M12/7 2.0 I4	D	FUJ; Ret	SUZ; 3	FUJ; Ret	SUZ; Ret	SUZ; 4				5th	28
1977	Murakami & Co. Tomei Jidosha	March 742	BMW M12/7 2.0 I4	D	SUZ; 12	SUZ; 8	MIN; Ret	SUZ; 15	FUJ; 6	FUJ; 6	SUZ; 2	SUZ; 5	7th	36
1978	Murakami Shokai RS Watanabe Tomei	March 742 Kai	BMW M12/7 2.0 I4	D	SUZ; 8	FUJ; Ret	SUZ; 2	SUZ; 2	SUZ	MIN; 3	SUZ; 3		4th	55
1979	Murakami Shokai RS Watanabe Tomei	March 782	BMW M12/7 2.0 I4		SUZ; 5	MIN; 3	SUZ; 1	FUJ; Ret	SUZ; 8	SUZ; 2	SUZ; 5		**3rd**	**63 (66)**
1980	Murakami & Co. Tomei Jidosha	March 782	BMW M12/7 2.0 I4		SUZ; 5	MIN; DNS	SUZ	SUZ	C				12th	7
1980	Team ADVAN	March 802	BMW M12/7 2.0 I4	Y					C	SUZ; 10	SUZ; Ret		12th	7
1981	ADVAN Tomei Jidosha	March 802 March 812	BMW M12/7 2.0 I4	Y	SUZ; 8	SUZ; 9	SUZ; 8	SUZ; 2	SUZ; 6				6th	29
1982	ADVAN Tomei Jidosha	March 822	BMW M12/7 2.0 I4	Y	SUZ; 4	FUJ; 1	SUZ; 3	SUZ; 5	SUZ; 6	SUZ; 9			4th	50 (58)
1983	ADVAN PIAA Tomei	March 822 March 832	BMW M12/7 2.0 I4	Y	SUZ; 8	FUJ; 1	MIN; 6	SUZ; 5	SUZ; 3	FUJ; 2	SUZ; 3	SUZ; 14	3rd	71 (74)
1984	ADVAN PIAA Nova Tomei	March 842	BMW M12/7 2.0 I4	Y	SUZ; Ret	FUJ; 9	MIN; 10	SUZ; 6	SUZ; 12	FUJ; 7	SUZ; 12	SUZ; 9	11th	15
1985	Team ADVAN	March 85J	BMW M12/7 2.0 I4	Y	SUZ; 6	FUJ; 5	MIN	SUZ; Ret	SUZ; 8	FUJ; 3	SUZ; 9	SUZ; 6	9th	37
1986	Team ADVAN	March 86J	Yamaha OX66 2.0 V6	Y	SUZ; Ret	FUJ; 6	MIN; 7	SUZ; 10	SUZ; 10	FUJ; 8	SUZ; Ret	SUZ; 10	12th	16

=== Complete Macau Grand Prix results ===
Year	Team	Car	Qualifying	Quali Race	Main race
1979	(Japan) Tomei Motor	Nova 53P	DNS	NC	NC

=== Complete JSPC results ===
(key) (Races in bold indicate pole position) (Races in italics indicate fastest lap)

Year	Team	Co-driver(s)	Car	Class	1	2	3	4	5	6	7	DC	Points
1984	ADVAN Sport Nova	(Japan) Kunimitsu Takahashi (United Kingdom) Geoff Lees	Porsche 956	C1	SUZ	TSU	**SUZ**; 1	FUJ				9th	20
1985	ADVAN Sport Nova	(Japan) Kunimitsu Takahashi	Porsche 962C	C1	**SUZ**; 3	**FUJ**; Ret	**FUJ**; 1	SUZ; 1	FUJ; Ret	FUJ; 1		**1st**	**72**
1986	ADVAN Sport Nova	(Japan) Kunimitsu Takahashi	Porsche 962C	C1	**SUZ**; 1	**FUJ**; 1	FUJ; 2	SUZ; Ret	FUJ; 8	FUJ; 2		**1st**	**70**
1987	Hoshino Racing	(Japan) Kazuyoshi Hoshino (United Kingdom) Dave Scott	Nissan R87E	C1	SUZ; Ret		FUJ; Ret	SUZ; 6	FUJ; 16	SEN; C	FUJ; Ret	30th	9
1987	Hoshino Racing	(Japan) Kazuyoshi Hoshino	Nissan R86V	C1		FUJ; 8						30th	9
1988	Calsonic NISMO	(Japan) Kazuyoshi Hoshino (Japan) Toshio Suzuki	Nissan R88C	C1	FUJ; Ret	SUZ; 6	FUJ; 7	FUJ; 5	SUZ; Ret	FUJ; 9		18th	20
1989	Ba-Tsu ADVAN Alpha Tomei	(Japan) Kazuo Mogi (Italy) Giovanni Lavaggi	Porsche 962C	C1	FUJ; 9	FUJ; 10	FUJ; Ret	SUZ; Ret	FUJ; 10			?	?
1990	Taisan SG Alpha Racing	(United Kingdom) Will Hoy (Sweden) Stanley Dickens	Porsche 962C	C1	FUJ	FUJ; C	FUJ	SUZ	SUG; 2	FUJ		?	?

=== 24 Hours of Le Mans results ===
Year	Team	Co-Drivers	Car	Class	Laps	Pos.	Class Pos.
1987	(Japan) NISMO	(Japan) Kazuyoshi Hoshino (Japan) Keiji Matsumoto	Nissan R87E	C1	181	DNF	DNF

=== Complete Japanese Touring Car Championship results ===
(key) (Races in bold indicate pole position) (Races in italics indicate fastest lap)

Year	Team	Co-driver	Car	Class	1	2	3	4	5	6	DC	Points
1986	STP/Ralliart	(Japan) Kunimitsu Takahashi	Mitsubishi Starion	DIV.3	MIN	SUG	TSU	SEN	FUJ; Ret	SUZ	NC	0
1987	ADVAN Sports Tomei	(Japan) Takao Wada	Nissan Skyline RS Turbo	DIV.3	MIN; Ret	SEN; 3	TSU; 3	SUG; 4	FUJ; 7	SUZ; 7	?	?
1988	Reebok Hasemi MS	(Japan) Masahiro Hasemi	Nissan Skyline GTS-R	JTC-1	SUZ; 5	MIN; Ret	SEN; Ret	TSU; 8	SUG; 5	FUJ; Ret	?	?
1989	Taisan ADVAN Alpha	(Sweden) Stanley Dickens	BMW M3 (E30)	JTC-2	MIN; 1	SEN; 1	TSU; 1	SUG; 1	SUZ; Ret	FUJ; 1	**1st**	**126**
1990	Team Taisan	(United Kingdom) Will Hoy	BMW M3 (E30)	JTC-2	MIN; 7	SUG; Ret	SUZ; 2	TSU; 2	SEN; 1	FUJ; Ret	5th	62
1991	Team Taisan	(Japan) Keiichi Tsuchiya	Nissan Skyline GT-R (R32)	JTC-1	SUG; Ret	SUZ; 2	TSU; 2	SEN; 3	AUT; 4	FUJ; 3	6th	128

=== Complete JGTC results ===
(key) (Races in bold indicate pole position) (Races in italics indicate fastest lap)

Year	Team	Car	Class	1	2	3	4	5	6	DC	Points
1996	AI Auto Racing	Porsche 911 RS	GT300	SUZ; 6	FUJ; Ret	SEN	FUJ; 4	SUG; 11	MIN; 9	12th	18
1997	AI Auto Racing	Porsche 911 RS	GT300	SUZ; Ret	FUJ; Ret	SEN; 11	FUJ; 9	MIN; 5	SUG; 11	19th	10
