= Kazuo Shimizu (racing driver) =

Japanese racing driver

Kazuo Shimizu (Shinjitai: 清水 和夫, born 11 February 1954, in Tokyo) is a Japanese racing driver. Shimizu was also active as a rally driver and later as a touring car racer. He won second place in the 1992 All Japan Touring Car Championship. His teammate at this time was Tom Kristensen. Since 1994, he has participated in the JTCC from the privateer team. He participated in Japanese races, and in the 24 Hours of Le Mans and the 12 Hours of Sebring. He is currently an international motoring journalist.

== Complete JTC results ==
| Year | Team | Car | Class | 1 | 2 | 3 | 4 | 5 | 6 | 7 | 8 | 9 | DC | Pts |
|---|---|---|---|---|---|---|---|---|---|---|---|---|---|---|
| 1988 | Object T | Honda Civic | JTC-3 | SUZ; 14 | NIS; 16 | | | | | | | | ? | ? |
| 1988 | Object T | Ford Sierra RS500 | JTC-1 | | | SEN; Ret | TSU; 1 | SUG; 2 | FUJ; Ret | | | | ? | ? |
| 1989 | Object T | Ford Sierra RS500 | JTC-1 | NIS; 3 | SEN; 7 | TSU; Ret | SUG; 2 | SUZ; 2 | FUJ; 4 | | | | 5th | 112 |
| 1990 | Object T | Ford Sierra RS500 | JTC-1 | NIS; Ret | SUG; Ret | SUZ; 4 | TSU; 3 | | | | | | 10th | 68 |
| 1990 | Object T | Nissan Skyline GT-R | JTC-1 | | | | | SEN; 3 | FUJ; Ret | | | | 10th | 68 |
| 1991 | Object T | Nissan Skyline GT-R | JTC-1 | SUG; Ret | SUZ; 3 | TSU; 4 | SEN; Ret | AUT; 3 | FUJ; 2 | | | | 7th | 98 |
| 1992 | Object T | Nissan Skyline GT-R | JTC-1 | AID; 2 | AUT; 2 | SUG; 4 | SUZ; 1 | MIN; 2 | TSU; 5 | SEN; 5 | FUJ; 3 | | 4th | 103 |
| 1993 | Racing Forum | Honda Civic | JTC-3 | MIN; 12 | AUT | SUG; 19 | SUZ; Ret | AID; 14 | TSU; Ret | TOK; 12 | SEN; 16 | FUJ; Ret | 16th | 36 |

== Complete 24 Hours of Le Mans results ==
| Year | Team | Co-Drivers | Car | Class | Laps | Pos. | Class Pos. |
|---|---|---|---|---|---|---|---|
| 1994 | (Germany) Honda Kremer Racing | (Switzerland) Philippe Favre (Japan) Hideki Okada | Honda NSX | LMGT2 | 240 | 16th | 7th |

== Complete Spa 24 Hour results ==
| Year | Team | Co-Drivers | Car | Class | Laps | Pos. | Class Pos. |
|---|---|---|---|---|---|---|---|
| 1993 | (Germany) Seikel Motorsport | (Belgium) Bertrand Gachot (Germany) Armin Hahne | Honda NSX | GT2 | 233 | DNF | DNF |
