= Osamu Hagiwara =

Japanese racing driver

Osamu Hagiwara (Hagiwara Osamu (萩原修), born August 7, 1960) is a Japanese racing driver.

== Racing record ==
=== Complete Japanese Touring Car Championship results ===
Year	Team	Car	Class	1	2	3	4	5	6	7	8	9	DC	Pts
1992	Kenji HKS Racing	Nissan Skyline GT-R	JTC-1	TAI; 15	AUT	SUG; 6	SUZ; 5	MIN	TSU; 7	SEN; 6	FUJ; 4		11th	42
1993	HKS Racing Co. Ltd.	Nissan Skyline GT-R	JTC-1	MIN; 9	AUT; Ret	SUG; 1	SUZ; 19	TAI; Ret	TSU; 9	TOK; 3	SEN; 2	FUJ; 4	9th	79
