= Naoki Nagasaka =

Japanese racing driver

Naoki Nagasaka (長坂 尚樹、born 24 April 1953) is a Japanese former racing driver. He has competed professionally in several Japan championships from the 1970s to the 1990s. He won the Japanese Touring Car Championship in 1985 and 1987, where he collected six wins and 15 podiums. He was also crowned at the 1984 All Japan Sports Prototype Championship.

== Racing record ==
=== 24 Hours of Le Mans results ===
Year	Team	Co-drivers	Car	Class	Laps	Pos.	Class Pos.
1990	(Japan) Toyota Team SARD	(France) Pierre-Henri Raphanel (Austria) Roland Ratzenberger	Toyota 90C-V	C1	241	DNF	DNF
1991	(Japan) Team Fedco (Netherlands) Euro Racing	(Japan) Kiyoshi Misaki (Japan) Hisashi Yokoshima	Spice SE90C	C1	326	11th	1st
1993	(Japan) Y's Racing Team (Japan) Sard Co. Ltd.	(Italy) Mauro Martini (Austria) Roland Ratzenberger	Toyota 93C-V	C2	363	5th	1st

=== Complete Japanese Touring Car Championship (-1993) results ===
Year	Team	Car	Class	1	2	3	4	5	6	7	8	9	DC	Pts
1985	Auto Beaurex	BMW 635CSi	Div.3	SUG; Ret	TSU; 1	NIS; 1	SUZ; 4	FUJ; 3					1st	97
1986	Auto Beaurex	BMW 635CSi	Div.3	NIS; 2	SUG; 11	TSU; Ret	SEN; 14	FUJ; 8	SUZ; 3				?	?
1987	Object T	Ford Sierra RS500	Div.3	NIS; Ret	SEN; 2	TSU; 1	SUG; Ret	FUJ; 2	SUZ; 1				1st	100
1988	Object T	Ford Sierra RS500	JTC-1	SUZ; 2	NIS; Ret	SEN; 1	TSU; Ret	SUG; 3	FUJ; Ret				?	?
1989	?	Ford Sierra RS500	JTC-1	NIS; 1	SEN; Ret	TSU; Ret	SUG; Ret	SUZ; Ret	FUJ; Ret				?	?
1990	City Life 43	Ford Sierra RS500	JTC-1	NIS; 12	SUG; Ret	SUZ; Ret	TSU; 7	SEN; 5	FUJ; 9				?	?
1991	FET Racing	Ford Sierra RS500	JTC-1	SUG; 3	SUZ; Ret	TSU; 16	SEN; Ret	AUT; Ret					？	？
1991	FET Racing	Nissan Skyline GT-R	JTC-1						FUJ; 5				？	？
1992	FET Racing	Nissan Skyline GT-R	JTC-1	TAI; 3	AUT; Ret	SUG; 7	SUZ; Ret	MIN; Ret	TSU; Ret	SEN; Ret	FUJ; 5		13th	28
1993	FET Racing	Nissan Skyline GT-R	JTC-1	MIN; Ret	AUT; Ret	SUG; 5	SUZ; Ret	TAI; Ret	TSU; 7	TOK; 4	SEN; 3	FUJ; 2	13th	49

=== Complete Japanese Touring Car Championship (1994-) results ===
Year	Team	Car	1	2	3	4	5	6	7	8	9	10	11	12	13	14	15	16	17	18	DC	pts
1994	FET Racing	Toyota Corolla	AUT; 1 Ret	AUT; 2; 10	SUG; 1; 6	SUG; 2; 16	TOK; 1; 11	TOK; 2; 10	SUZ; 1; 7	SUZ; 2; 6	MIN; 1 Ret	MIN; 2 DNS	AID; 1; 7	AID; 2 Ret	TSU; 1 Ret	TSU; 2 DNS	SEN; 1 Ret	SEN; 2 Ret	FUJ; 1; 11	FUJ; 2; 11	17th	20

=== Complete JGTC results ===
(key)

Year	Team	Car	Class	1	2	3	4	5	6	DC	Pts
1995	FET Racing Team	Toyota Supra	GT1	SUZ; 8	FUJ; 5	SEN; 10	FUJ; 4	SUG; Ret	MIN; Ret	12th	22
1996	910 Racing	Porsche 911 RSR	GT300	SUZ	FUJ; 1	SEN; 4	FUJ; 1			4th	50
1996	Toyota Team Sard	Toyota Supra	GT500					SUG; 7	MIN	20th	4
1997	Power Craft	Toyota Supra	GT500	SUZ	FUJ	SEN; 7	FUJ	MIN; 4	SUG; 6	12th	20
