= Eiichi Tajima =

Japanese racing driver

Eiichi Tajima (田嶋栄一 - Tajima Eiichi; born December 3, 1967) is a Japanese professional racing driver.

== Racing record ==
=== Complete Japanese Formula 3 results ===
(key) (Races in bold indicate pole position) (Races in italics indicate fastest lap)

| Year | Team | Engine | 1 | 2 | 3 | 4 | 5 | 6 | 7 | 8 | 9 | 10 | DC | Pts |
|---|---|---|---|---|---|---|---|---|---|---|---|---|---|---|
| 1988 | Eiichi Tajima | Nissan | SUZ; 10 | TSU; 16 | FUJ; Ret | SUZ; 11 | SUG; 16 | TSU; Ret | SEN; Ret | SUZ; 20 | NIS; 11 | SUZ; Ret | NC | 0 |
| 1989 | Eiichi Tajima | VW | SUZ; 10 | | | | | | | | | | 14th | 1 |
| 1989 | Regal | VW | | | SUZ; DNS | | | | | | NIS; 10 | | 14th | 1 |
| 1989 | Regal | Toyota | | FUJ; 12 | | SEN; C | TSU; 20 | SUG; 14 | | SUZ; Ret | | SUZ; 23 | 14th | 1 |
| 1989 | Regal | Mugen | | | | | | | TSU; 6 | | | | 14th | 1 |
| 1990 | Team Benetton | Mugen | SUZ; Ret | FUJ; 4 | SUZ | TSU; Ret | SEN; Ret | SUG; 10 | TSU; 11 | SUZ; Ret | NIS; 19 | SUZ; 17 | 14th | 3 |
| 1991 | Kokuyo Racing | Mugen | SUZ | FUJ | SUZ | TSU | SEN | MIN | TSU; 14 | SUG | SUZ | SUZ | NC | 0 |
| 1993 | Magazine House | Mugen | SUZ | TSU; 11 | FUJ; 18 | SUZ; DSQ | SEN; 12 | TAI; 12 | MIN; 11 | SUG; 6 | SUZ; DNS | | 15th | 1 |
| 1994 | Asada Racing | Mugen | SUZ; Ret | FUJ; 4 | TSU; 8 | SUZ; 14 | SEN; 18 | TOK | MIN | TAI | SUG | SUZ | 12th | 3 |

=== Complete Japanese Touring Car Championship (–1993) results ===
| Year | Team | Car | Class | 1 | 2 | 3 | 4 | 5 | 6 | 7 | 8 | 9 | DC | Pts |
|---|---|---|---|---|---|---|---|---|---|---|---|---|---|---|
| 1992 | Team Over Take | BMW M3 Sport Evolution | JTC-2 | TAI; 1 | AUT; Ret | SUG; 5 | SUZ; 1 | MIN; 3 | TSU; 1 | SEN; 8 | FUJ; 8 | | **3rd** | **86** |
| 1993 | Team Over Take | BMW M3 Sport Evolution | JTC-2 | MIN; 4 | AUT; 5 | SUG; 3 | SUZ; Ret | TAI; Ret | TSU; 6 | TOK; Ret | SEN; 1 | FUJ; 7 | 11th | 60 |

=== Complete Japanese Formula 3000/Formula Nippon results ===
(key) (Races in bold indicate pole position; races in italics indicate fastest lap)

| Year | Entrant | 1 | 2 | 3 | 4 | 5 | 6 | 7 | 8 | 9 | 10 | DC | Pts |
|---|---|---|---|---|---|---|---|---|---|---|---|---|---|
| 1994 | Team Cerumo | SUZ | FUJ | MIN | SUZ | SUG | FUJ | SUZ | FUJ | FUJ; 15 | SUZ; Ret | NC | 0 |
| 1996 | Art Brilliant Gullwing | SUZ; 13 | MIN; 12 | FUJ; 13 | TOK; 12 | SUZ; 18 | SUG; Ret | FUJ; Ret | MIN; Ret | SUZ; Ret | FUJ; DNS | NC | 0 |
| 1997 | Team 5Zigen | SUZ | MIN | FUJ | SUZ; 13 | SUG; Ret | FUJ; 9 | MIN; Ret | MOT; Ret | FUJ; Ret | SUZ; 12 | NC | 0 |

=== Complete JGTC/Super GT Results ===
(key) (Races in bold indicate pole position) (Races in italics indicate fastest lap)

| Year | Team | Car | Class | 1 | 2 | 3 | 4 | 5 | 6 | 7 | 8 | 9 | DC | Pts |
|---|---|---|---|---|---|---|---|---|---|---|---|---|---|---|
| 1995 | Team Take One | Porsche 911 RS | GT1 | SUZ; 10 | FUJ; Ret | SEN; 7 | FUJ; 10 | SUG; Ret | MIN; 2 | | | | 13th | 21 |
| 1996 | Team Take One | Porsche 911 RS | GT500 | SUZ; 7 | FUJ; 11 | SEN; 9 | FUJ; Ret | SUG; Ret | MIN; Ret | | | | 19th | 6 |
| 1997 | Team 5Zigen | Toyota Supra | GT500 | SUZ; 6 | FUJ; Ret | SEN; 6 | FUJ; Ret | MIN; 12 | SUG; 1 | | | | 8th | 32 |
| 1998 | Team Taisan with Advan | Dodge Viper GTS-R | GT500 | SUZ; 14 | FUJ; C | SEN | | | | | | | NC | 0 |
| 1998 | Team 5Zigen | Toyota Supra | GT500 | | | | FUJ; Ret | MOT; Ret | MIN; Ret | SUG; Ret | | | NC | 0 |
| 1999 | Team Taisan | Dodge Viper GTS-R | GT500 | SUZ; 9 | FUJ; 13 | SUG; 15 | MIN; 13 | | | | | | 23rd | 2 |
| 1999 | Team Taisan with Advan | Porsche 911 RSR | GT300 | | | | | FUJ; 7 | TAI; 6 | MOT; 11 | | | 21st | 10 |
| 2001 | Sigmatech Racing | Toyota MR-S | GT300 | TAI; Ret | FUJ | SUG; Ret | FUJ; Ret | MOT; Ret | SUZ; 11 | MIN; 1 | | | 14th | 20 |
| 2002 | Hitotsuyama Racing | McLaren F1 GTR | GT500 | TAI; 13 | FUJ; 8 | SUG; 6 | SEP; 8 | FUJ; 13 | **MOT**; 3 | MIN; Ret | SUZ; Ret | | 17th | 27 |
| 2003 | Hitotsuyama Racing | McLaren F1 GTR | GT500 | TAI; 13 | FUJ; 9 | SUG; 12 | FUJ; 18 | FUJ; 14 | MOT; Ret | AUT | SUZ; 15 | | 20th | 2 |
| 2005 | Team Gaikokuya | Porsche 911 GT3 | GT300 | OKA; 18 | | SEP; 20 | SUG | MOT | | | | | NC | 0 |
| 2005 | Hitotsuyama Racing | McLaren F1 GTR | GT500 | | FUJ; Ret | | | | FUJ; 17 | AUT | SUZ | | NC | 0 |
| 2006 | Toyota Team Kraft | Lexus SC430 | GT500 | SUZ | OKA | FUJ | SEP | SUG | SUZ; 3 | MOT | AUT | FUJ | 20th | 16 |
