= Tetsuya Ota =

Japanese racing driver

- Nationality: (Japan) Japanese
- Born: 6 November 1959 (age 66); Maebashi, Gunma Prefecture

24 Hours of Le Mans career
- Years: 1993–1996
- Teams: Simpson Engineering, Ennea SRL/Ferrari Club Italia
- Best finish: None (DNF)
- Class wins: 0

Tetsuya Ota (太田 哲也, Ōta Tetsuya; born 6 November 1959) is a retired racing driver from Maebashi in the Gunma Prefecture, Japan. He survived a fiery multi-car pileup he was involved in during a JGTC race at Fuji Speedway on May 3, 1998, caused by a safety car which was driven at twice the recommended speed in torrential rain during a parade lap. Ota was seriously injured and, as a result, he brought a lawsuit against the race organizers.

== Life ==
Following his education at Musashi University, Ota turned to racing cars in 1982. He drove in the junior formula FJ1600 (Formula Japan) series before moving on to All-Japan Formula Three Championship in 1986 and then graduated to race in the domestic Formula 3000 series between 1987 and 1991, excepting 1989. Ota also competed in numerous domestic series such as Japanese Touring Car Championship (JTCC), All Japan Sports Prototype Championship (JSPC) and Fuji Grand Champion Series as well as in Super Taikyu. While competing in JSPC, Ota was a factory driver for Mazda between 1989 and 1991.

Ota's first foray in racing outside Japan was when he competed in four straight 24 Hours of Le Mans races between 1993 and 1996, all with a DNF and one DNS.

In 1990, Ota married Atsuko. In 1993 he became a regular contributor to Neko Publishing's Tipo magazine. This gave him the privilege of being on the selection committee of the Car of the Year Japan (COTY).

Since his inaugural season, Ota has competed in the All-Japan GT Championship. His speciality was racing Ferraris, especially in other series. Ota became the most highly regarded driver of the marque in Japan.

== 1998 JGTC Fuji incident ==
On May 3, 1998, during round 2 of the JGTC at Fuji Speedway, Ota was badly injured. There were 47,000 spectators in attendance for the JGTC round scheduled for 300 kilometres (186 miles) (67 laps). At the time of race there was torrential rain and visibility was limited. Following the parade lap, the safety car drove through the starting line at 150 km/h (93 mph) then suddenly slowed down. This caused 910 Racing's Porsche 911 RSR driven by Tomohiko Sunako to aquaplane and strike the rear of Kaoru Hoshino's 911 GT2. Of the GT300 cars, the third car in front of the Porsches (and 22nd on the grid), the BMW M3 of Yasushi Hitotsuyama, behind, managed to avoid the Porsche by driving onto the grass and then back to the circuit, while the Porsche struck a barrier and rested on the grass. A caution flag was waved out.

Seconds later, the Team Ferrari Club of Japan's Ferrari F355 Challenge driven by Ota, slowed down, causing it to aquaplane and swerve left directly into Sunako's Porsche. Both exploded into a fireball on impact. The Ferrari, after hitting the wall, slid across to the other side of the track and rested at the pit stop exit. Another Porsche swerved to avoid Ota.

Sunako managed to stumble out of his car with a fractured right leg and was quickly attended to by rescue officials.

The RE Amemiya RX-7 driven by Shinichi Yamaji stopped in front of the Ferrari while the other cars drove on. Yamaji used a fire extinguisher from the side of the track to extinguish the fire and then helped to release Ota's safety harness. He did this before race marshals arrived.

Ota was trapped in his car for 1 minute and 30 seconds while exposed to 800 °C (1,470 °F) temperatures and had to be dragged out of the car by a safety marshal. The marshal laid him on the ground which caused his semi-melted visor to sag onto his face. Ota attempted to get up, but fell. During another attempt, another marshal spotted Ota, picked him up, and bundled him into the circuit's support vehicle, rather than an ambulance.

Ota was taken to a hospital in Gotemba where he was treated for third-degree burns to his face and neck area and minor burns to the rest of the body. He required plastic surgery to the nasal area as a result of the visor melting on his face. He also suffered from intoxication from the fumes he inhaled from the fire.

As a result of his injuries, Ota was no longer able to move his right arm, right shoulder and fingers properly. His injuries brought an end to his professional race career.

=== Race canceled ===
The race was to be rescheduled to a shortened 51 lap race, but thick fog rolled in over the circuit causing the race to be delayed. Organizers waited, hoping that the weather would improve, but by 17:00 the organizers announced that the race was officially called off and all results were voided. Under the FIA Code, the race had not officially started, three laps being required for this.

== Court case ==
Reports on the incident were filed by the JAF and race organizers. One of the reports stated that Ota did not wear a fire resistant balaclava as required; which he denied. Also, the report stated that the safety team started fighting fire 20 seconds after the accident, but the flames of Ota's car were first fought by fellow drivers 50 seconds after the crash while Ota was still trapped inside.

As a result, Ota filed a damages suit for about ¥290 million ($2,500,000 US) against seven organizers for their failure to implement proper safety measures in Tokyo District Court in November 1999. Those held liable included circuit operator, Fuji Speedway, series organizer, Japan Automobile Federation (JAF); the race operator, VICIC (Victory Circle Club) and broadcaster TV Tokyo.

On 29 October 2003, six race sponsors and promoters including TV Tokyo, VICIC and Fuji Speedway were found guilty of gross negligence. The success of the lawsuit was due to the recorded TV coverage of the incident which was shown in court. The responsible parties were ordered to pay ¥90 million ($800,000 US) compensation for pain and suffering, on the grounds that their first aid response was poorly prepared and their race marshals were poorly trained. The judge, Tsuyoshi Ono, decided that organizers neglected their responsibility, as Ota was left in his burning vehicle for longer than the 30 seconds in which he should have been out of the car. The organizers had failed to take sufficient precautionary measures, such as having fire engines on standby as is required to extinguish fires and rescue drivers in 30 seconds or less.

The judge determined the pre-race agreement between Ota and the organizers not to pursue legal action in the event of an accident was unacceptable. Despite his written pledge to organizers not to seek compensation in the event of an accident, which all drivers were required to sign, the judge ruled it unfair and said it runs counter to public order and morals. Ono added that the pledge, branded by him as a "death pledge", aims to exempt organizers from responsibility, allowing them to benefit economically from races.

The judge ruled that the safety car was driving at an excessive pace of 150 km/h rather than at the safety pace of 60 km/h, causing the accident when it suddenly slowed down. He also ruled that the fire fighting and rescue preparations were not sufficient.

The judge ruled that Ota was partially responsible as he did not decelerate early enough. Ota was satisfied with the outcome.

TV Tokyo denied any responsibility themselves throughout the case, as they did not regard themselves as one of the race organizers. The court found TV Tokyo guilty of gross negligence for attempting to avoid responsibility for its part in the incident.

The claim against JAF was rejected as they could not be held responsible.

== Post court case ==
A documentary film about the incident titled Crash (クラッシュ) was released in 2003, as well as the book titled Re•Birth, documenting Ota's struggle to rebuild his life and his body.

A number of improved safety measures were introduced following the accident, including the adaptation of the Medical Car in JAF competition that contained medical and rescue specialists, similar to INDYCAR's AMR Safety Team, which uses medical and rescue specialists in a fully equipped pickup truck.

Ota has since continued to be involved in motorsport, but no longer in a professional capacity. He runs a car tuning and race preparation garage, named Tezzo, specializing in Italian cars.

Shinichi Yamaji, the driver who saved Ota's life by extinguishing his car's fire and pulling him out, died on May 26, 2014, aged 50, from an undisclosed long illness. He reportedly checked in a hospital on May 25 due to a worsening health condition and died suddenly the next day.
