= Kiyoshi Misaki =

Japanese racing driver

Kiyoshi Misaki (見崎 清志、born 13 January 1946) is a former Japanese racing driver.

Misaki finished third in the 1971 Macau Grand Prix, driving a JRM AC7, behind Jan Bussell and Riki Ohkubo.

== 24 Hours of Le Mans results ==
Year	Team	Co-drivers	Car	Class	Laps	Pos.	Class Pos.
1991	(Japan) Team Fedco (Netherlands) Euro Racing	(Japan) Hisashi Yokoshima (Japan) Naoki Nagasaka	Spice SE90C	C1	326	11th	1st
