= Hisashi Yokoshima =

Japanese racing driver

Hisashi Yokoshima (横島 久、born 28 December 1957) is a retired Japanese racing driver.

== 24 Hours of Le Mans results ==
Year	Team	Co-drivers	Car	Class	Laps	Pos.	Class Pos.
1991	(Japan) Team Fedco (Netherlands) Euro Racing	(Japan) Kiyoshi Misaki (Japan) Naoki Nagasaka	Spice SE90C	C1	326	11th	1st
