= Morio Nitta =

Japanese racing driver

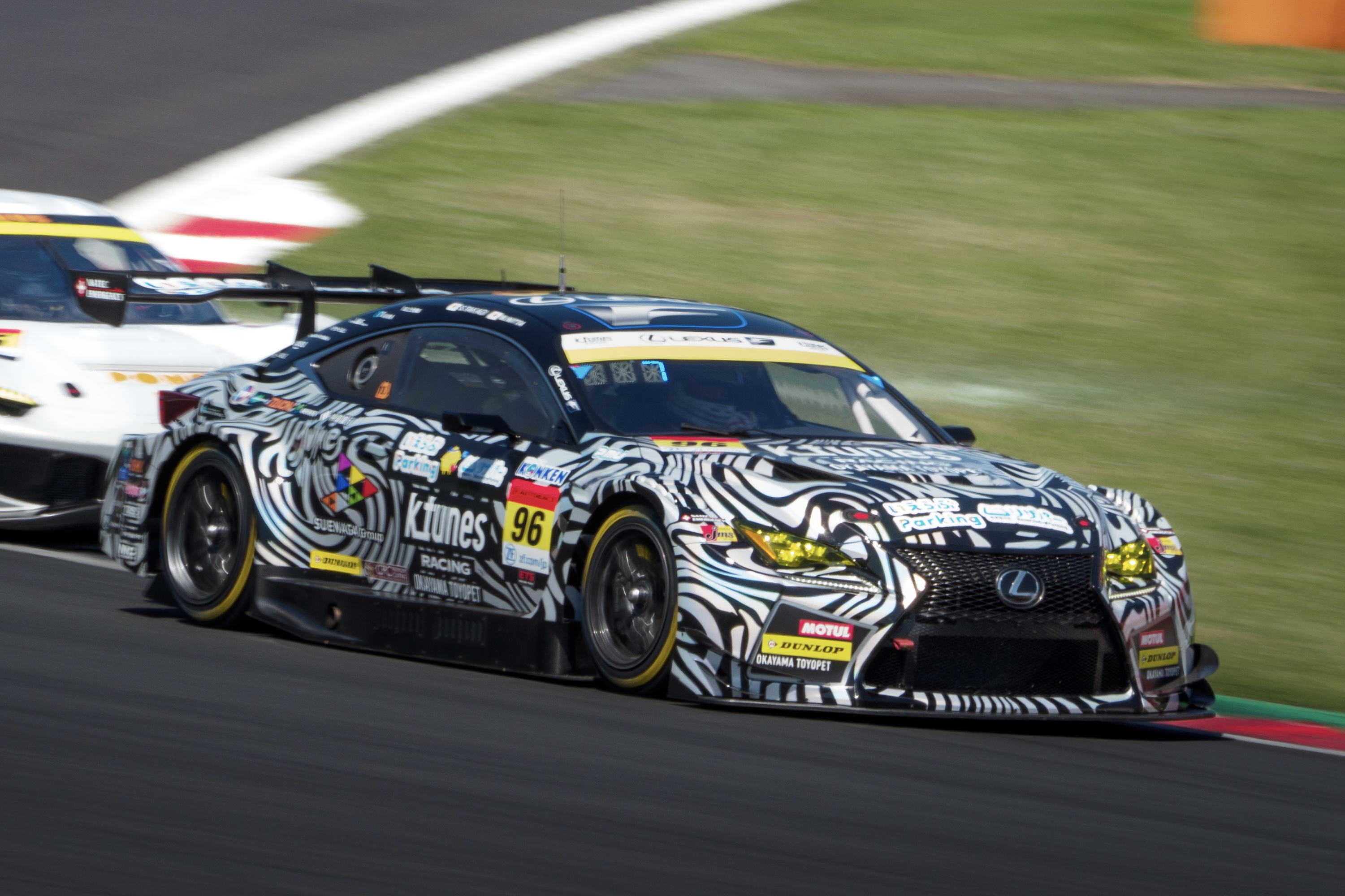
- Nitta in 2024
- Nationality: (Japan) Japanese
- Born: 30 January 1967 (age 59) Tokyo, Japan

Super GT career
- Debut season: 1994
- Current team: K-tunes racing
- Categorisation: FIA Silver (until 2026); FIA Bronze (2027–)
- Car number: 96
- Former teams: Osuka Racing, Team Taisan Jr., apr, Momo Corse Racing Team with Tsuchiya, Super Autobacs Racing with A'PEX, Autobacs Racing Team Aguri, LM corsa, INGING & Arnage Racing
- Starts: 232
- Wins: 22
- Podiums: 56
- Poles: 7
- Fastest laps: 10
- Best finish: 1st in 1996, 1999, 2002

Previous series
- 1986 1987–1996 1988–1992: Fuji Freshman Race; Japanese Touring Car Championship; Japanese Formula 3 Championship

Championship titles
- 1990 1996, 1999, 2002: Japanese Touring Car Championship; Super GT

Morio Nitta (新田 守男, Nitta Morio; born 30 January 1967) is a Japanese racing driver currently competing in the Super GT Series for K-tunes Racing. He is a three-time champion of the GT300 class, winning the championship in 1996, 1999, and 2002.

Nitta is the current record holder for most races in any class of the All Japan Grand Touring Car Championship/Super GT Series, as well as the record holder for the most career wins, podiums, and points in the GT300 class.

In 2027, Nitta was downgraded from Silver to a Bronze rating under the FIA Driver Categorisation system.

== Early racing career ==
Nitta began his professional racing career in 1986, participating in the Fuji Freshman Race.

Nitta would later compete in the Japanese Formula 3 Championship and the Japanese Touring Car Championship, where he and Keiichi Suzuki won the JTC-3 class Championship in 1990 driving a Toyota Corolla Levin for Tsuchiya Engineering.

== JGTC/Super GT career ==
Nitta first competed in Super GT in 1994, the inaugural season of what was then known as the All-Japan Grand Touring Car Championship (JGTC) driving a Porsche 964 at Sportsland Sugo.

Nitta got his first full-time drive in the GT300 class with Team Taisan Jr. in 1996. Joined by his former JTCC teammate Keiichi Suzuki, Nitta won three races and won the GT300 championship in his first full season. Nitta and Suzuki would go on to finish second in points the following year with two wins.

Nitta joined A'PEX in 1998, achieving a best finish of second at the Japan Special GT Cup at Fuji Speedway alongside co-driver Peter Dumbreck in the #44 Toyota MR2.

For the 1999 season, A'PEX formed a joint entry with Tsuchiya Engineering, and beginning at the All-Japan Fuji GT Race, Nitta would drive the #25 MR2 alongside Shinichi Takagi. Nitta and Takagi won in their first race together, and with four podiums in the final six races, Nitta would win his second GT300 Championship by a single point over Takeshi Tsuchiya (the son of Tsuchiya Engineering owner Haruo Tsuchiya) and Yuji Ide.

Driving the new third-generation Toyota MR-S sponsored by Super Autobacs, Nitta won the season finale at Suzuka Circuit. A'PEX began a new collaboration with Autobacs Racing Team Aguri (ARTA) in 2001, where Nitta and Takagi won the opening race at TI Circuit Aida. In 2002, the duo opened the season with another win at TI Circuit, then reeled off five top-five finishes in the final five races to win the championship. Nitta became the first three-time GT300 champion in JGTC/Super GT history.

The racing division of A'PEX, which spun off from its parent company and rebranded as apr, ran the new Nissan-powered ASL Garaiya for ARTA beginning in 2003. With the exception of 2006, when ARTA suspended its GT300 programme for a season, Nitta drove the Garaiya from 2003 to 2010. Alongside Takagi, Nitta won seven races in the Garaiya, and finished runner-up in the GT300 championship standings in 2004 and 2008. During the 2006 season, Nitta drove a Toyota MR-S entered under the apr banner, and won the final round at Fuji after the R&D Sport Vemac 408R of Haruki Kurosawa and Shinsuke Shibahara ran out of fuel on the last lap.

Nitta and Takagi went their separate ways after twelve seasons after the 2010 season. In 2011, Nitta would continue with apr, driving the mid-engine layout Toyota Corolla Axio alongside Toyota Young Driver Program (TDP) prospect Yuji Kunimoto.

The Corolla Axio was replaced in 2012 by apr's new Toyota Prius, the first hybrid GT300 vehicle to compete in Super GT. Nitta joined Koki Saga for the Prius' debut campaign where they were rewarded with a second-place finish at the summer race at Fuji. At the 2013 Fuji 500 km, Nitta and Saga gave the Prius its milestone first Super GT win for a hybrid vehicle. Nitta scored two more podiums in 2014 at the wheel of the Prius.

His long association with apr ended after the 2014 season, and Nitta joined the LM corsa team in 2015 in their No. 51 BMW Z4 GT3 which was prepared by INGING Motorsport. LM corsa and INGING switched to a new Ferrari 488 GT3 for the 2016 season, and in 2017, INGING would enter the car in collaboration with Arnage Racing. Nitta's best result during this stretch was a second-place finish at Sugo in 2017.

Nitta joined the new K-tunes Racing LM corsa team in 2018, which received technical support from INGING. At the wheel of their new No. 96 Lexus RC F GT3, Nitta scored his first win in five years alongside Yuichi Nakayama in the third round at Suzuka. Nitta and Nakayama also won the penultimate round in Autopolis, giving Nitta his 20th career win.

K-tunes Racing spun off from LM corsa in 2019, and new teammate Sena Sakaguchi joined Nitta in the No. 96 Lexus. The duo won a rain-shortened opening round at Okayama, the team's home race, then won the third round at Suzuka. With two wins and four podiums, Nitta and Sakaguchi finished second in the championship, and Nitta retook sole ownership of the career wins record, now at 22 career victories.

In 2022, Nitta and Takagi were reunited at K-tunes Racing for the first time since 2010. They combined for six top-ten finishes that season.

== Outside Super GT ==
Before achieving success in JGTC/Super GT, Nitta entered the 24 Hours of Spa-Francorchamps seven times from 1989 to 1998. His best result was 12th overall in 1989, driving a Toyota Corolla GT alongside Kaori Okamoto and Hideshi Matsuda.

Nitta made his GT World Challenge Asia debut in the 2022 season finale at Okayama, driving a new K-tunes Racing Lexus RC F GT3. Nitta and Kazunori Suenaga would return to contest the full GT World Challenge Asia Japan Cup in 2023.

== Racing record ==
=== Complete Japanese Formula 3 results ===
(key) (Races in bold indicate pole position) (Races in italics indicate fastest lap)

Year	Team	Chassis	Engine	1	2	3	4	5	6	7	8	9	10	DC	Points
1988	UCLA	Reynard 873	Toyota 3S-G 2.0 I4	SUZ	TSU	FUJ	SUZ; Ret	SUG; Ret	TSU; 18	SEN; 13	SUZ; DNS	NIS; 18	SUZ; 10	NC	0
1989	Innoma House Gold	Ralt RT32	Toyota 3S-G 2.0 I4	SUZ	FUJ	SUZ	TSU	SUG	TSU	SUZ	MIN	SUZ; DNQ	SUZ	NC	0
1992	Kanagawa Clinic Racing Team	Ralt RT36 Ralt RT35 Reynard 923	Toyota 3S-G 2.0 I4	SUZ; DNQ	TSU	FUJ; 19	SUZ; DNQ	SEN; 20	TAI; 27	MIN; DNQ	SUG	SUZ		NC	0

=== Complete Japanese Touring Car Championship results ===
(key) (Races in bold indicate pole position) (Races in italics indicate fastest lap)

Year	Team	Car	Class	1	2	3	4	5	6	7	8	9	10	11	12	13	14	15	16	17	18	DC	Points
1987	TOM'S Aramis 900	Toyota Corolla Levin	Div. 1	MIN	SEN	TSU	SUG	FUJ; Ret	SUZ													NC	0
1988	Unknown	Toyota Corolla FX	JTC-3	SUZ; 11	MIN; 8	SEN; Ret																NC	0
1988	Unknown	Toyota Corolla Levin	JTC-3				TSU; DNS	SUG; Ret	FUJ; Ret													NC	0
1989	FET TOM'S	Toyota Corolla Levin	JTC-3	MIN; Ret	SEN; 7	TSU; Ret	SUG; 7	SUZ; 7	FUJ; 7													NC	0
1990	Team ADVAN	Toyota Corolla Levin	JTC-3	MIN; 4	SUG; 1	SUZ; 4	TSU; 1	SEN; 3	FUJ; 1													**1st**	**104**
1991	Team ADVAN	Toyota Corolla Levin	JTC-3	SUG; 1	SUZ; Ret	TSU; 1	SEN; 7	AUT; 5	FUJ; Ret													**3rd**	**56**
1992	Team ADVAN	Toyota Corolla Levin	JTC-3	TIA	AUT; 1	SUG; Ret	SUZ; Ret	MIN; 2	TSU; 9	SEN; 4	FUJ; 5											11th	55
1993	Team ADVAN	Toyota Corolla Levin	JTC-3	MIN; 3	AUT; 4	SUG; 4	SUZ; 2	TIA; 8	TSU; 4	TOK; Ret	SEN; 2	FUJ; 2										6th	90
1994	Tsuchiya Engineering	Toyota Corolla Ceres	JTCC	AUT1	AUT2	SUG1; Ret	SUG2; Ret	TOK1	TOK2	SUZ1; Ret	SUZ2; 23	MIN1	MIN2	TAI1; DNS	TAI2; Ret	TSU1	TSU2	SEN1; 13	SEN2; 12	FUJ1	FUJ2	NC	0
1996	Toyota Team FET	Toyota Corolla AE110	JTCC	FUJ1	FUJ2	SUG1	SUG2	SUZ1	SUZ2	MIN1	MIN2	SEN1; 13	SEN2; 12	TOK1; 15	TOK2; 13	FUJ1; DNS	FUJ2; 13					NC	0

=== Complete Super GT results ===
(key) (Races in bold indicate pole position) (Races in italics indicate fastest lap)

Year	Team	Car	Class	1	2	3	4	5	6	7	8	9	DC	Points
1994	Osuka Racing	Porsche 964 RSR	GT2	FUJ	SEN	FUJ	SUG; 5	MIN					18th	8
1996	Team Taisan Jr.	Porsche 964 RSR	GT300	SUZ; 1	FUJ; 2	SEN; Ret	FUJ; 2	SUG; 1	MIN; 1				**1st**	**90**
1997	Team Taisan Jr.	Porsche 993 RSR	GT300	SUZ; 4	FUJ; 1	SEN; 3	FUJ; 1	MIN; 3	SUG; 2				**2nd**	**89**
1998	A'PEX	Toyota MR2	GT300	SUZ; 7	FUJ; C	SEN; 6	FUJ; 2	MOT; 4	MIN; 4	SUG; Ret			**3rd**	**45**
1999	Momo Corse Racing Team with Tsuchiya	Toyota MR2	GT300	SUZ; 8	FUJ; 1	SUG; 2	MIN; 2	FUJ; 5	TAI; Ret	MOT; 3			**1st**	**73**
2000	Super Autobacs Racing with A'PEX	Toyota MR-S	GT300	MOT; 6	FUJ; 10	SUG; 6	FUJ; 6	TAI; Ret	MIN; 14	SUZ; 1			7th	39
2001	ARTA with A'PEX	Toyota MR-S	GT300	TAI; 1	FUJ; 3	SUG; Ret	FUJ; 5	MOT; Ret	SUZ; Ret	MIN; Ret			7th	40
2002	ARTA with A'PEX	Toyota MR-S	GT300	TAI; 1	FUJ; Ret	SUG; 17	SEP; 2	FUJ; 4	MOT; 5	MIN; 5	SUZ; 4		**1st**	**75**
2003	Autobacs Racing Team Aguri	ASL ARTA Garaiya	GT300	TAI; 19	FUJ; 3	SUG; 4	FUJ; 10	FUJ; 6	MOT; 2	AUT; 5	SUZ; NC		7th	55
2004	Autobacs Racing Team Aguri	ASL ARTA Garaiya	GT300	TAI; 2	SUG; 5	SEP; 21	TOK; 1	MOT; 1	AUT; 2	SUZ; 2			**2nd**	**92**
2005	Autobacs Racing Team Aguri	ASL ARTA Garaiya	GT300	OKA; 10	FUJ; 2	**SEP**; 1	SUG; 18	MOT; 3	FUJ; Ret	**AUT**; 2	SUZ; 8		**3rd**	**74**
2006	apr	Toyota MR-S	GT300	SUZ; Ret	OKA; 9	FUJ; 2	SEP; Ret	SUG; 5	SUZ; 3	MOT; 10	AUT; Ret	FUJ; 1	5th	60
2007	Autobacs Racing Team Aguri	ASL ARTA Garaiya	GT300	SUZ; 18	OKA; 17	FUJ; 1	SEP; Ret	SUG; Ret	SUZ; 2	**MOT**; 3	AUT; 5	FUJ; 7	4th	66
2008	Autobacs Racing Team Aguri	ASL ARTA Garaiya	GT300	SUZ; 5	**OKA**; 1	FUJ; 7	SEP; 12	SUG; 1	SUZ; Ret	MOT; 9	AUT; 2	FUJ; 9	**2nd**	**77**
2009	Autobacs Racing Team Aguri	ASL ARTA Garaiya	GT300	OKA; 2	SUZ; 5	**FUJ**; 1	SEP; 10	SUG; 9	SUZ; 2	FUJ; 7	**AUT**; 4	MOT; 14	5th	71
2010	Autobacs Racing Team Aguri	ASL ARTA Garaiya	GT300	SUZ; Ret	OKA; 6	FUJ; 2	SEP; 2	SUG; 6	SUZ; 2	FUJ; C	MOT; 12		**2nd**	**55**
2011	apr	Toyota Corolla Axio apr GT	GT300	OKA; 6	FUJ; 7	SEP; 6	SUG; 2	SUZ; 7	FUJ; 14	AUT; 8	MOT; 9		7th	38
2012	apr	Toyota Prius apr GT	GT300	OKA; Ret	FUJ; 6	SEP; Ret	SUG; 8	SUZ; Ret	**FUJ**; 2	AUT; 8	MOT; Ret		10th	26
2013	apr	Toyota Prius apr GT	GT300	OKA; Ret	FUJ; 1	SEP; Ret	SUG; 22	SUZ; 15	FUJ; 2	FSW	AUT; 15	MOT; 20	8th	35
2014	apr	Toyota Prius apr GT	GT300	**OKA**; Ret	FUJ; 6	AUT; Ret	SUG; Ret	FUJ; 6	SUZ; 2	CHA; 17	MOT; 2		8th	43
2015	LM Corsa	BMW Z4 GT3	GT300	OKA; 9	FUJ; 9	CHA	FUJ; 4	SUZ; Ret	SUG; 9	AUT; 17	MOT; 15		17th	14
2016	LM Corsa	Ferrari 488 GT3	GT300	OKA; 5	FUJ; 6	SUG; 9	FUJ; 11	SUZ; 11	CHA; 12	MOT; 11	MOT; Ret		16th	13
2017	INGING & Arnage Racing	Ferrari 488 GT3	GT300	OKA; Ret	FUJ	AUT; 27	SUG; 2	FUJ; 14	SUZ; 16	CHA; 17	MOT; 21		17th	15
2018	K-tunes Racing LM Corsa	Lexus RC F GT3	GT300	OKA; 14	FUJ; 14	**SUZ**; 1	CHA; 10	FUJ; 10	SUG; 14	AUT; 1	MOT; 10		6th	45
2019	K-tunes Racing	Lexus RC F GT3	GT300	OKA; 1	FUJ; 16	SUZ; 1	CHA; 14	FUJ; 15	AUT; 5	SUG; 3	MOT; 3		**2nd**	**58**
2020	K-tunes Racing	Lexus RC F GT3	GT300	FUJ; 11	FUJ; 23	SUZ; 28	MOT; 4	FUJ; 26	SUZ; 5	MOT; 17	FUJ; 22		16th	15
2021	K-tunes Racing	Lexus RC F GT3	GT300	OKA; 6	FUJ; 14	SUZ; 17	MOT; 13	SUG; 8	AUT; 2	MOT; 14	FUJ; 19		12th	23
2022	K-tunes Racing	Lexus RC F GT3	GT300	OKA; 27	FUJ; 6	SUZ; 7	FUJ; 5	SUZ; 25	SUG; 9	AUT; 8	MOT; 6		16th	22.5
2023	K-tunes Racing	Lexus RC F GT3	GT300	OKA; 14	FUJ; 9	SUZ; 22	FUJ; 23	SUZ; 8	**SUG**; 8	AUT; Ret	MOT; 5		18th	15
2024	K-tunes Racing	Lexus RC F GT3	GT300	OKA; 6	FUJ; 17	SUZ; 9	FUJ; Ret	SUG; Ret	AUT; 3	MOT; 14	SUZ; 9		13th	20
2025	K-tunes Racing	Lexus RC F GT3	GT300	OKA; 6	FUJ; 13	SEP; 16	FS1; Ret	FS2 (15)	SUZ; 14	SUG; Ret	AUT; 17	MOT; 13	22nd	18.5
2026	K-tunes Racing	Lexus RC F GT3	GT300	OKA; 7	FUJ; 10	FUJ; 15	SUZ; 26	SUG; 24	AUT; 1	MOT; 1	MOT; 9		3rd	73
