= Osamu Nakako =

Japanese racing driver

- Nationality: (Japan) Japanese
- Born: August 20, 1954 (age 72)

Japanese Touring Car Championship career
- Debut season: 1985
- Teams: Mugen
- Championships: 5 (1987, 1988, 1991, 1992, 1997)
- Wins: 29
- Podiums: 50

All-Japan GT Championship career
- Debut season: 1996
- Teams: Team Taisan, Mugen x Dome Project
- Wins: 2
- Podiums: 6
- Poles: 3
- Fastest laps: 3
- Best finish: 4th in 1998

Osamu Nakako (中子修, Nakako Osamu; born August 20, 1954) is a Japanese former professional racing driver. He is a five-time champion of the Japanese Touring Car Championship, having won titles in 1987, 1988, 1991, 1992 and 1997. The first four of these titles came in the sub-1,600 cc division of the Group A era and the final one during the Super Touring era, on all occasions driving Honda cars for Mugen. He was also a race winner for Honda and Mugen in the GT500 class of the All-Japan GT Championship and the Suzuka 1000km, and contributed to their first titles in the series in 2000.

== Racing career ==
Nakako competed in various car racing series since the late 1970s, winning the Japanese Formula 3 Championship in 1981. In 1985, he made his debut in the Japanese Touring Car Championship (JTC) at the third round of the season, driving an E-AT Honda Civic Si in the sub-1,600 cc class for the Mugen team alongside Satoru Nakajima. The pair qualified on pole position on their debut, but retired from the race. In the following race at Suzuka, they took the overall pole position, and converted it into an overall victory after beating cars from higher classes, taking Honda's first JTC win. They finished third in the final race at Fuji Speedway, having again started from pole in their class. For 1986, Nakako was paired with Koji Sato at Mugen; the two won the opening round, but retired from all other races that year.

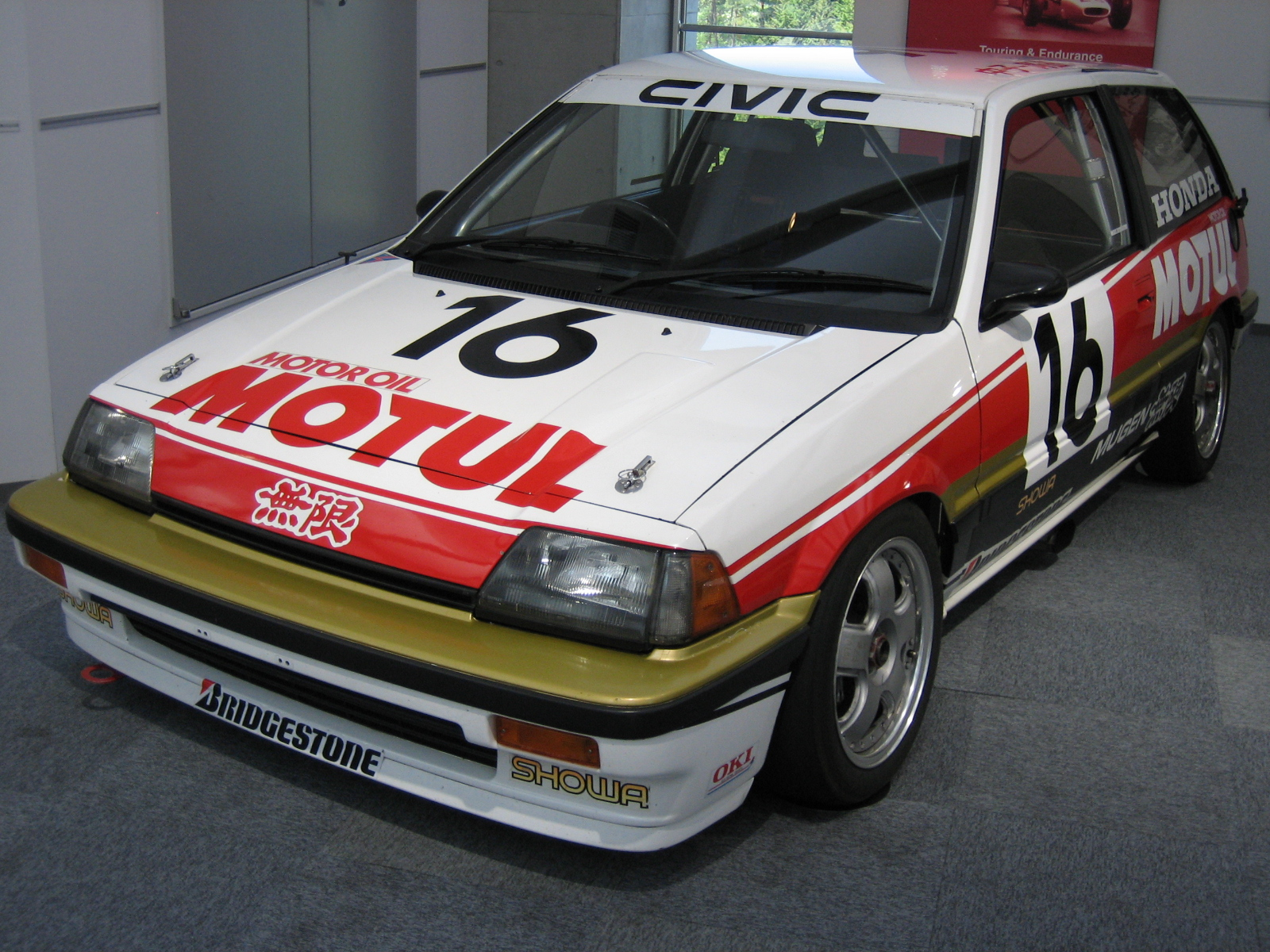
Nakako won every race of the 1987 JTC season with the E-AT Civic Si

For the 1987 JTC season, Nakako again had a new co-driver in Hideki Okada. It proved to be a dominant season for Nakako and Okada as they achieved the feat of winning all six races held during the season, with Nakako winning his first drivers' championship and Honda their first manufacturers' title. Honda introduced the new EF3 Civic SiR for 1988, and during the season the pair won twice and finished second three times to win the championship for the second consecutive year. After finishing third in the 1989 standings with two wins driving alongside Toshio Suzuki, Nakako was reunited with Okada for 1990, and with the new EF9 Civic SiR, the duo won twice to take third in the standings again. Nakako became champion again in 1991, having scored two wins, and then made it back-to-back titles in 1992 after starting the season with two wins in the EF9 Civic and finishing it with two further wins in the new EG6 Civic SiR, which was introduced by Honda at the fourth round. Three victories in 1993 brought third place in the standings for Nakako that season.

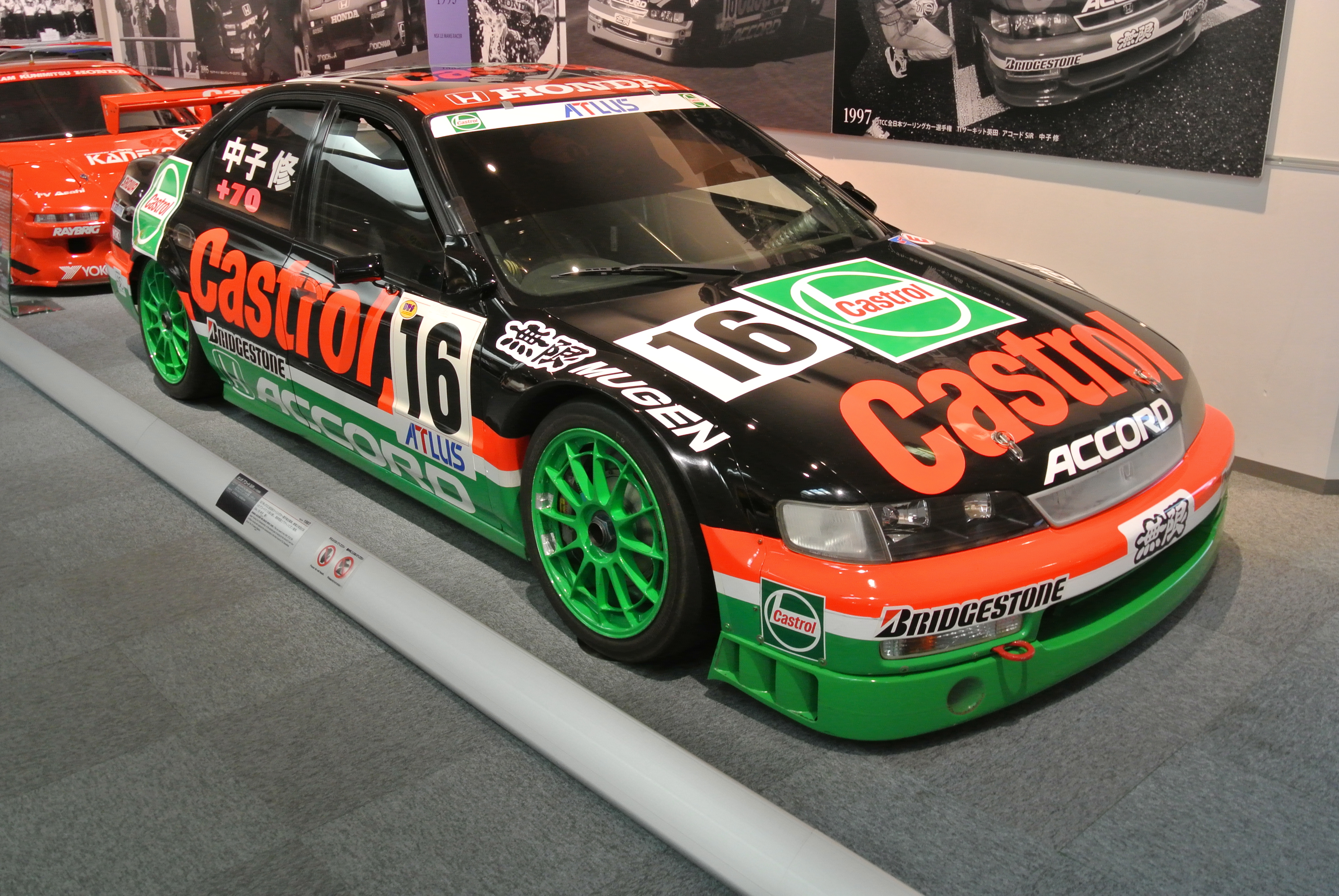
The Honda Accord with which Nakako became JTCC champion in 1997

The Japanese Touring Car Championship (abbreviated as JTCC from 1994) underwent major changes for 1994: the previous Group A regulations were replaced by Super Touring, there were no different classes, drivers drove each car alone and race distances were shortened. Nakako remained at Team Mugen, but the team's Honda Civic Ferio could not match the performance of rival cars, and Nakako finished 11th and 13th in 1994 and 1995, respectively, with his best results being one fourth in 1994 and two thirds in 1995. For the 1996 season, Honda introduced the Accord, which proved to be highly competitive. Nakako finished nine of the ten races which he completed on the podium, including two wins, and finished runner-up to Honda stablemate Naoki Hattori in the championship. In 1997, Nakako had won four times, twice finished second and placed in the top-five on three further occasions, meaning he went into the final race of the season leading the championship. With seven laps to go in the finale, Nakako attempted to pass one of his main title rivals, Satoshi Motoyama, for position; the move sent Motoyama spinning while Nakako was able to continue. A lap later when Nakako was about to lap Motoyama, Motoyama took Nakako out of the race – Motoyama was fined for the collision and received a multiple race ban. In the end, the only remaining contender, Takuya Kurosawa, was unable to outscore Nakako, and Nakako was crowned champion.

Honda left the JTCC after the 1997 season and shifted their focus to the All-Japan GT Championship (JGTC), where they campaigned the NSX in the GT500 class. Nakako joined the Mugen side of the Mugen x Dome Project team and his co-driver was Ryo Michigami. In 1998, Nakako and Michigami won two of the last three races of the season, contributing to Honda's record-setting winning streak, and finished fourth in the drivers' standings. The 1999 season saw the pair finish tenth in the standings with two third-placed podiums, while at the non-championship Suzuka 1000km race, Nakako and Michigami were joined by Katsutomo Kaneishi, and the trio went on to win the race to take the first overall win for Honda at the event. After four races into the 2000 season, Nakako and Michigami had scored two podiums and were third in the championship, but ahead of the fifth round, Nakako retired from professional racing at the age of 46. The retirement was believed to be down to him not being physically fit enough to drive the high-downforce cars. His performances that season contributed to title success, as Michigami and Mugen x Dome Project went on to win the championships at the end of the season.

== Racing record ==
=== Complete Japanese Touring Car Championship (JTC) results ===
(key)

Year	Team	Car	Class	1	2	3	4	5	6	7	8	9	DC	Pts
1985	Mugen	Honda Civic	Div.1	SUG	TSU	NIS; Ret	SUZ; 1	FUJ; 3						
1986	Mugen	Honda Civic	Div.1	NIS; 1	SUG	TSU; Ret	SEN; Ret	FUJ; Ret	SUZ; Ret					
1987	Mugen	Honda Civic	Div.1	NIS; 1	SEN; 1	TSU; 1	SUG; 1	FUJ; 1	SUZ; 1				1st	120
1988	Mugen	Honda Civic	JTC-3	SUZ; 1	NIS; 2	SEN; 1	TSU; 6	SUG; 2	FUJ; 2				1st	?
1989	Mugen	Honda Civic	JTC-3	NIS; 1	SEN; 3	TSU; Ret	SUG; 1	SUZ; Ret	FUJ; Ret				3rd	?
1990	Mugen	Honda Civic	JTC-3	NIS; 5	SUG; 2	SUZ; 1	TSU; 4	SEN; 1	FUJ; 4				3rd	78
1991	Mugen	Honda Civic	JTC-3	SUG; Ret	SUZ; 1	TSU; 4	SEN; 2	AUT; Ret	FUJ; 1				1st	74
1992	Mugen	Honda Civic	JTC-3	TAI; 1	AUT; 3	SUG; 1	SUZ; Ret	MIN; Ret	TSU; 1	SEN; 4	FUJ; 1		1st	93
1993	Mugen	Honda Civic	JTC-3	MIN; 1	AUT; 3	SUG; 1	SUZ; 7	TAI; 2	TSU; 6	TOK; 1	SEN; 4	FUJ; 8	3rd	110

=== Complete Japanese Touring Car Championship (JTCC) results ===
(key)

Year	Team	Car	1	2	3	4	5	6	7	8	9	10	11	12	13	14	15	16	17	18	DC	Pts
1994	Team Mugen	Honda Civic Ferio	AUT; 1	AUT; 2	SUG; 1 Ret	SUG; 2; 6	TOK; 1; 12	TOK; 2 Ret	SUZ; 1; 16	SUZ; 2 Ret	MIN; 1; 4	MIN; 2; 7	TAI; 1; 12	TAI; 2; 17	TSU; 1; 10	TSU; 2 Ret	SEN; 1; 5	SEN; 2; 6	FUJ; 1; 26	FUJ; 2; 13	11th	28
1995	Team Mugen	Honda Civic Ferio	FUJ; 1; 13	FUJ; 2 Ret	SUG; 1; 3	SUG; 2; 3	TOK; 1; 8	TOK; 2; 9	SUZ; 1 Ret	SUZ; 2; 15	MIN; 1; 7	MIN; 2 Ret	TAI; 1 Ret	TAI; 2 DNS	SEN; 1; 10	SEN; 2 Ret	FUJ; 1 Ret	FUJ; 2 Ret			13th	28
1996	Team Mugen	Honda Accord	FUJ; 1; 2	FUJ; 2; 2	SUG; 1; 2	SUG; 2; 3	SUZ; 1; 1	SUZ; 2; 4	MIN; 1	MIN; 2	SEN; 1; 3	SEN; 2; 2	TOK; 1; 2	TOK; 2; 1	FUJ; 1 DSQ	FUJ; 2 DSQ					2nd	115
1997	Team Mugen	Honda Accord	FUJ; 1 C	FUJ; 2 C	TAI; 1; 2	TAI; 2; 1	SUG; 1; 8	SUG; 2 Ret	SUZ; 1; 4	SUZ; 2; 5	MIN; 1; 1	MIN; 2; 1	SEN; 1; 4	SEN; 2; 10	TOK; 1 Ret	TOK; 2; 2	FUJ; 1; 1	FUJ; 2 Ret			1st	107

=== Complete All-Japan GT Championship results ===
(key)

Year	Team	Car	Class	1	2	3	4	5	6	7	DC	Pts
1996	Team Taisan	Porsche 911	GT500	SUZ; 9	FUJ; 9	SEN; Ret	FUJ; 12	SUG; 12	MIN; 6		15th	10
1998	Mugen x Dome Project	Honda NSX	GT500	SUZ; Ret	FUJ; C	SEN; Ret	FUJ; 5	MOT; 1	MIN; 11	SUG; 1	4th	48
1999	Mugen x Dome Project	Honda NSX	GT500	SUZ; 14	FUJ; 12	SUG; 3	MIN; 3	FUJ; 9	TAI; 16	MOT; 4	10th	36
2000	Mugen x Dome Project	Honda NSX	GT500	MOT; 2	FUJ; 8	SUG; 2	FUJ; 10	TAI	MIN	SUZ	10th	34
