= Hironori Takeuchi =

Japanese racing driver

Hironori Takeuchi (born December 22, 1964, in Kanagawa) is a Japanese auto racing driver.

== Career ==
Takeuchi competed in the Japanese Touring Car Championship between 1996 and 1998. He competed in the All-Japan GT Championship between 1995 and 2004, winning it in 2001. He continued to compete in the series after it became Super GT in 2005, competing in the GT300 class until 2007.

In 2005, Takeuchi joined Ao Chi Hong at his Ao's Racing Team for the finale of the World Touring Car Championship, the Race of Macau, in a Toyota Altezza. He failed to qualify for the races after setting a fastest lap over the required time, almost twelve seconds off the pace.

== Racing record ==
=== Super Taikyu Series Class results ===
(key) (Races in bold indicate pole position) (Races in italics indicate fastest lap)

Year	Team	Class	Co-Drivers	Car	1	2	3	4	5	6	7	8	DC	Pts
1994	Project μ	1	(Japan) Masami Kageyama (Japan) Osamu Hagiwara(Rd.6)	Nissan Skyline GT-R	MIN; 2	SUZ; 1	SEN; 5	FUJ; Ret	TAI; 3	TOK; 4	TSU; 1	SUG; 1	2nd	？
1995	Nissan Prince Chiba Falken	1	(Japan) Hisashi Yokoshima (Japan) Takamasa Nakagawa(Rd.5)	Nissan Skyline GT-R	MIN; Ret	SEN; 2	FUJ; 1	TAI; Ret	TOK; 1	SUZ; Ret	SUG; 3		2nd	？
1996	Nissan Prince Chiba Falken	1	(Japan) Hisashi Yokoshima (Japan) Takamasa Nakagawa(Rd.5)	Nissan Skyline GT-R	MIN; Ret	SEN; 1	TAI; 2	FUJ; 4	TOK; 3	SUZ; 1	SUG; 4		2nd	？
1997	Nissan Prince Chiba Falken	1	(Japan) Hisashi Yokoshima (Japan) Takamasa Nakagawa(Rd.4) (Japan) Eiki Amemiya(Rd.4)	Nissan Skyline GT-R	MIN; 5	SEN; 1	TAI; 1	TOK; 1	SUG; 1	SUZ; 2	FUJ; 3		1st	？
1998	Nissan Prince Chiba Falken	1	(Japan) Hisashi Yokoshima (Japan) Takamasa Nakagawa(Rd.5)	Nissan Skyline GT-R	MIN; 1	SUG; 1	SUZ; 3	TAI; 1	TOK; 1	SEN; 3	MOT; 1	FUJ; 2	1st	？
1999	Nissan Prince Chiba Falken	1	(Japan) Tetsuya Tanaka(Rd.1-5,7) (Japan) Masahiko Kondō(Rd.5,8) (Japan) Masahiro Hasemi(Rd.6)	Nissan Skyline GT-R	MIN; 2	SEN; 1	SUZ; 1	TAI; 5	TOK; 1	MOT; 2	FUJ; 1	SUG; 3	1st	？
2000	5ZIGEN Falken	1	(Japan) Tetsuya Tanaka (Japan) Masahiko Kondō(Rd.5)	Nissan Skyline GT-R	MIN; Ret	SEN; 1	SUZ; 1	TAI; 1	TOK; 1	MOT; 1	FUJ; 2	SUG; 2	1st	？
2001	Falken	1	(Japan) Tetsuya Tanaka (Japan) Masami Kageyama(Rd.5)	Nissan Skyline GT-R	MIN; Ret	SEN; 1	SUZ; 2	MOT; 1	TOK; 2	TAI; 1	SUG; 1	FUJ; 2	1st	？
2002	Falken	1	(Japan) Tetsuya Tanaka (Japan) Masami Kageyama(Rd.5)	Nissan Skyline GT-R	MIN; 1	SEN; 2	SUZ; 2	MOT; 2	TOK; 2	TAI; 1	SUG; 2	FUJ; 1	2nd	？

=== JGTC/Super GT results ===
(key) (Races in bold indicate pole position) (Races in italics indicate fastest lap)

Year	Team	Car	Class	1	2	3	4	5	6	7	8	9	DC	Pts
1995	RE Amemiya	Mazda RX-7	GT2	SUZ	FUJ; 9	SEN; 1	FUJ; 2	SUG; Ret	MIN; 1				3rd	57
1996	Team Cerumo	Toyota Supra	GT500	SUZ	FUJ	SEN; 1	FUJ; Ret	SUG; 4	MIN; 2				7th	46
1997	Team Cerumo	Toyota Supra	GT500	SUZ; 7	FUJ; 9	SEN; 4	FUJ; 8	MIN; 5	SUG; 10				10th	28
1998	Team Cerumo	Toyota Supra	GT500	SUZ; 9	FUJ; C	SEN; Ret	FUJ; Ret	MOT; 5	MIN; 12	SUG; 3			11th	22
1999	Team Cerumo	Toyota Supra	GT500	SUZ; 7	**FUJ**; 2	SUG; Ret	MIN; 8	FUJ; 6	TAI; 8	MOT; 12			14th	31
2000	Team Cerumo	Toyota Supra	GT500	MOT; 4	FUJ; 3	SUG; 12	**FUJ**; Ret	**TAI**; 1	MIN; 6	SUZ; 11			4th	58
2001	Team Cerumo	Toyota Supra	GT500	TAI; Ret	FUJ; 2	SUG; 3	FUJ; 4	MOT; 2	SUZ; 6	MIN; 16			**1st**	**58**
2002	Team Cerumo	Toyota Supra	GT500	TAI; 4	FUJ; 1	SUG; 16	SEP; 9	**FUJ**; 1	MOT; 13	MIN; 9	SUZ; 6		**3rd**	**65**
2003	Team Cerumo	Toyota Supra	GT500	TAI; Ret	**FUJ**; Ret	SUG; 10	**FUJ**; 4	**FUJ**; 3	MOT; 9	**AUT**; 3	SUZ; 13		9th	46
2004	Team Cerumo	Toyota Celica	GT300	TAI; 17	SUG; 20	SEP; 8	TOK; 23	MOT; 8	AUT; 18	SUZ; 9			16th	9
2005	Team Cerumo	Toyota Celica	GT300	TAI; 11	FUJ; 14	SEP; 12	SUG; 8	MOT; 14	FUJ; Ret	AUT; 8	SUZ; 18		15th	7
2006	Team Cerumo	Toyota Celica	GT300	SUZ; 11	TAI; 12	FUJ; Ret	SEP	SUG; 11	**SUZ**; 1	MOT; Ret	AUT; 13	FUJ; 21	13th	21
2007	Team Mach	Vemac 320R	GT300	SUZ; 7	TAI; 11	FUJ; 12	SEP; 19	SUG; 14	SUZ; Ret	MOT; 4	AUT; 18	FUJ; 6	16th	19
2012	Green Tech Reon With Shift	Mercedes-Benz SLS AMG GT3	GT300	TAI; 12	FUJ; 10	SEP; 6	SUG; 2	SUZ; Ret	FUJ; DNS	AUT; Ret	MOT; 8		12th	24
2013	Okinawa-Imp Racing with Shift	Mercedes-Benz SLS AMG GT3	GT300	TAI; 4	FUJ; 4	SEP; 12	SUG; 4	SUZ; 2	FUJ; 10	AUT; 3	MOT; 7		4th	60
2016	Lamborghini Team Direction Shift	Lamborghini Huracán	GT300	TAI	FUJ	SUG	FUJ	SUZ; 19	CHA	MOT; 27	MOT; 18		NC	0

=== Complete JTCC results ===
(key) (Races in bold indicate pole position) (Races in italics indicate fastest lap)

Year	Team	Car	1	2	3	4	5	6	7	8	9	10	11	12	13	14	15	16	DC	Pts
1996	Toyota Team Cerumo	Toyota Corona EXiV	FUJ; 1; 10	FUJ; 2; 10	SUG; 1 Ret	SUG; 2; 12	SUZ; 1; 11	SUZ; 2; 11	MIN; 1; 7	MIN; 2; 4	SEN; 1; 11	SEN; 2; 18	TOK; 1 Ret	TOK; 2; 20	FUJ; 1 Ret	FUJ; 2 DNS			16th	13
1997	Toyota Team Cerumo	Toyota Chaser	FUJ; 1 C	FUJ; 2 C	TAI; 1; 9	TAI; 2; 5	SUG; 1; 6	SUG; 2; 9	SUZ; 1; 7	SUZ; 2; 7	MIN; 1; 8	MIN; 2; 9	SEN; 1; 8	SEN; 2; 4	TOK; 1; 8	TOK; 2; 8	FUJ; 1; 11	FUJ; 2; 6	9th	43
1998	Toyota Team Cerumo	Toyota Chaser	FUJ; 1; 1	FUJ; 2; 6	MOT; 4	SUG; 1; 2	SUG; 2; 2	SUZ; 1; 3	SUZ; 2; 3	MIN; 1; 2	MIN; 2 Ret	TAI; 7	FUJ; 5						**3rd**	**100**

Sporting positions
Preceded by Ryo Michigami	All-Japan Grand Touring Car Champion (GT500); 2001 with: Yuji Tachikawa	Succeeded by Juichi Wakisaka; Akira Iida
