= 1997 Japanese Touring Car Championship =

Seasons
- ← 1996 1998 →

The 1997 Japanese Touring Car Championship season was the 13th edition of the series. It began at Fuji Speedway on 6 April and finished after eight events, also at Fuji Speedway on 2 November. The championship was won by Osamu Nakako, driving for Mugen Honda.

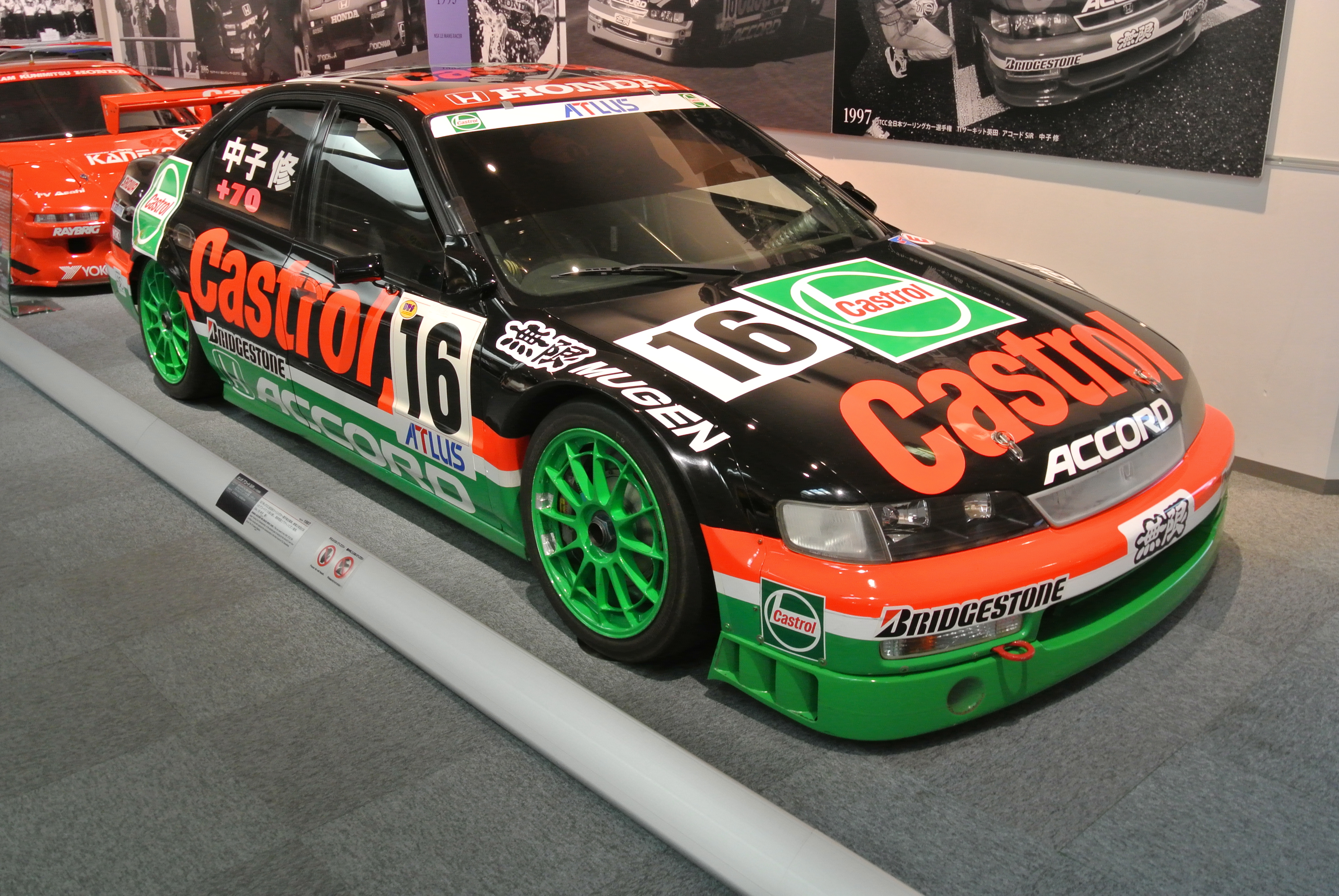
Osamu Nakako won the championship driving a Honda Accord.

== Teams & Drivers ==
Team	Car	No.	Drivers	Rounds
Mugen Honda	Honda Accord	1	(Japan) Naoki Hattori	8
Object T	Toyota Corona EXiV	11	(Japan) Takahiko Hara	All
Nismo	Nissan Primera GT	12	(Japan) Kazuyoshi Hoshino	All
Asano Racing Service	BMW 318i	13	(Japan) Takeo Asano	8
Mooncraft Mugen Honda	Honda Accord	14	(Japan) Ryō Michigami	All
Mugen Honda	Honda Accord	15	(Japan) Takuya Kurosawa	All
Mugen Honda	Honda Accord	16	(Japan) Osamu Nakako	All
Endless Sport	BMW 318i	18	(Japan) Mitsuhiro Kinoshita	1, 8
Racing Project Bandoh	Toyota Corona EXiV	19	(Japan) Katsutomo Kaneishi	All
Hitotsuyama Racing	BMW 318i	21	(Japan) Yasushi Hitotsuyama	1, 3-5, 8
Hitotsuyama Racing	BMW 318i	21	(Japan) Mikio Hitotsuyama	2, 6-7
Object T	Toyota Corona EXiV	22	(Japan) Hidetoshi Mitsusada	8
Nismo	Nissan Primera GT	23	(Japan) Satoshi Motoyama	All
Tsuchiya Engineering	Toyota Chaser	24	(Japan) Keiichi Tsuchiya	8
Tsuchiya Engineering	Toyota Corona EXiV	25	(Japan) Masami Kageyama	All
Mooncraft Mugen Honda	Honda Accord	33	(Japan) Hideki Okada	All
Auto Tech Racing	BMW 318i	35	(Japan) Akihiko Nakaya	5-6
Toyota Team TOM's	Toyota Chaser	36	(Japan) Masanori Sekiya	All
Toyota Team TOM's	Toyota Corona EXiV	37	(Germany) Michael Krumm	1-4
Toyota Team TOM's	Toyota Chaser	37	(Germany) Michael Krumm	5-8
Toyota Team Cerumo	Toyota Chaser	38	(Japan) Hironori Takeuchi	All
Toyota Team Cerumo	Toyota Corona EXiV	39	(Argentina) Juan Manuel Silva	1-6
Toyota Team Cerumo	Toyota Chaser	39	(Argentina) Juan Manuel Silva	7-8
Dandelion Racing	Toyota Corona EXiV	68	(Japan) Tetsuya Tanaka	All
Team Something	Toyota Corolla AE110	72	(Japan) Masahiro Matsunaga	1-6, 8
Team Something	Toyota Corolla AE110	72	(Japan) Minoru Tanaka	7
HKS Opel Team Japan	Opel Vectra	87	(Japan) Akira Iida	All

== Calendar ==
Round		Circuit	Date	Pole position	Fastest lap	Winning driver	Winning team	Ref
1	R1	(Japan) Fuji Speedway, Shizuoka	6 April	(Japan) Satoshi Motoyama	Races cancelled due to adverse weather conditions.			
1	R2	(Japan) Fuji Speedway, Shizuoka	6 April	(Japan) Ryō Michigami	Races cancelled due to adverse weather conditions.			
2	R3	(Japan) TI Circuit Aida, Okayama	11 May	(Japan) Osamu Nakako	(Japan) Satoshi Motoyama	(Japan) Takuya Kurosawa	Mugen Honda	
2	R4	(Japan) TI Circuit Aida, Okayama	11 May	(Japan) Osamu Nakako	(Japan) Osamu Nakako	(Japan) Osamu Nakako	Mugen Honda	
3	R5	(Japan) Sportsland SUGO, Miyagi	25 May	(Germany) Michael Krumm	(Japan) Kazuyoshi Hoshino	(Germany) Michael Krumm	Toyota Team TOM's	
3	R6	(Japan) Sportsland SUGO, Miyagi	25 May	(Germany) Michael Krumm	(Japan) Hideki Okada	(Japan) Kazuyoshi Hoshino	Nismo	
4	R7	(Japan) Suzuka Circuit, Mie	8 June	(Japan) Takuya Kurosawa	(Japan) Takuya Kurosawa	(Japan) Takuya Kurosawa	Mugen Honda	
4	R8	(Japan) Suzuka Circuit, Mie	8 June	(Japan) Takuya Kurosawa	(Japan) Satoshi Motoyama	(Japan) Satoshi Motoyama	Nismo	
5	R9	(Japan) Mine Central Circuit, Yamaguchi	13 July	(Japan) Satoshi Motoyama	(Japan) Osamu Nakako	(Japan) Osamu Nakako	Mugen Honda	
5	R10	(Japan) Mine Central Circuit, Yamaguchi	13 July	(Japan) Satoshi Motoyama	(Japan) Ryō Michigami	(Japan) Osamu Nakako	Mugen Honda	
6	R11	(Japan) Sendai Hi-Land Raceway, Miyagi	7 September	(Japan) Akira Iida	(Japan) Kazuyoshi Hoshino	(Japan) Satoshi Motoyama	Nismo	
6	R12	(Japan) Sendai Hi-Land Raceway, Miyagi	7 September	(Japan) Akira Iida	(Japan) Kazuyoshi Hoshino	(Japan) Akira Iida	HKS Opel Team Japan	
7	R13	(Japan) Tokachi International Speedway, Hokkaidō	21 September	(Japan) Satoshi Motoyama	(Germany) Michael Krumm	(Japan) Takuya Kurosawa	Mugen Honda	
7	R14	(Japan) Tokachi International Speedway, Hokkaidō	21 September	(Japan) Takuya Kurosawa	(Japan) Ryō Michigami	(Japan) Takuya Kurosawa	Mugen Honda	
8	R15	(Japan) Fuji Speedway, Shizuoka	2 November	(Japan) Naoki Hattori	(Japan) Osamu Nakako	(Japan) Osamu Nakako	Mugen Honda	
8	R16	(Japan) Fuji Speedway, Shizuoka	2 November	(Japan) Naoki Hattori	(Japan) Naoki Hattori	(Japan) Kazuyoshi Hoshino	Nismo	

== Championship Standings ==
Points were awarded 15, 12, 9, 7, 6, 5, 4, 3, 2, 1 to the top 10 finishers in each race, with no bonus points for pole positions or fastest laps. Drivers would have counted their best 12 scores, but with the cancellation of the first two races of the season, only the ten best were counted.

Pos	Driver	FUJ		AID		SUG		SUZ		MIN		SEN		TOK		FUJ		Pts
1	(Japan) Osamu Nakako	C	C	**2**	**1**	8	Ret	4	5	1	1	4	10	Ret	2	1	Ret	107
2	(Japan) Takuya Kurosawa	C	C	1	4	5	6	**1**	**2**	Ret	6	7	6	1	**1**	10	4	102
3	(Japan) Satoshi Motoyama	**C**	C	4	2	3	3	Ret	1	**DSQ**	**3**	1	Ret	**2**	4	6	DSQ	100
4	(Japan) Kazuyoshi Hoshino	C	C	6	14	2	1	2	6	4	11	2	Ret	3	Ret	8	1	95
5	(Japan) Ryō Michigami	C	**C**	3	3	Ret	Ret	5	4	2	2	13	2	5	3	5	12	88
6	(Japan) Masami Kageyama	C	C	5	6	9	8	3	3	5	7	5	7	6	11	4	13	61
7	(Japan) Katsutomo Kaneishi	C	C	Ret	10	Ret	7	11	10	3	14	Ret	5	4	5	3	3	52
8	(Japan) Akira Iida	C	C	10	Ret	4	5	6	Ret	Ret	DNS	**3**	**1**	12	DNS	13	Ret	43
9	(Japan) Hironori Takeuchi	C	C	9	5	6	9	7	7	8	9	8	4	8	8	11	6	43
10	(Germany) Michael Krumm	C	C	7	9	**1**	**Ret**	10	Ret	6	4	Ret	DNS	Ret	10	12	Ret	35
11	(Argentina) Juan Manuel Silva	C	C	8	13	7	2	13	8	Ret	12	6	Ret	Ret	7	16	Ret	31
12	(Japan) Hideki Okada	C	C	12	Ret	Ret	4	8	Ret	Ret	5	9	Ret	11	9	7	5	30
13	(Japan) Masanori Sekiya	C	C	13	7	11	Ret	12	9	Ret	DNS	Ret	3	9	6	18	8	25
14	(Japan) Naoki Hattori															**2**	**2**	24
15	(Japan) Tetsuya Tanaka	C	C	11	8	10	10	16	11	7	Ret	Ret	8	Ret	DNS	9	Ret	14
16	(Japan) Takahiko Hara	C	C	15	11	Ret	13	9	Ret	Ret	10	11	DNS	7	12	15	7	11
17	(Japan) Akihiko Nakaya									Ret	8	Ret	DNS					3
18	(Japan) Masahiro Matsunaga	C	C	14	12	12	11	14	12	9	15	10	Ret			NC	Ret	3
19	(Japan) Mikio Hitotsuyama			16	Ret							12	9	13	14			2
20	(Japan) Mitsuhiro Kinoshita	C	C													Ret	9	2
21	(Japan) Yasushi Hitotsuyama	C	C			13	12	15	13	10	13					DNS	11	1
22	(Japan) Minoru Tanaka													10	13			1
23	(Japan) Keiichi Tsuchiya															14	10	1
24	(Japan) Takeo Asano															17	Ret	0
NC	(Japan) Hidetoshi Mitsusada															Ret	DNS	0
Pos	Driver	FUJ		AID		SUG		SUZ		MIN		SEN		TOK		FUJ		Pts

Colour	Result
Gold	Winner
Silver	Second place
Bronze	Third place
Green	Points classification
Blue	Non-points classification
Blue	Non-classified finish (NC)
Purple	Retired, not classified (Ret)
Red	Did not qualify (DNQ)
Red	Did not pre-qualify (DNPQ)
Black	Disqualified (DSQ)
White	Did not start (DNS)
White	Withdrew (WD)
White	Race cancelled (C)
Blank	Did not practice (DNP)
Blank	Did not arrive (DNA)
Blank	Excluded (EX)

**Bold** - Pole
Italics - Fastest lap
