= Takahiko Hara =

Japanese racing driver

- Born: November 26, 1963 (age 62)

Takahiko Hara (原 貴彦 - Hara Takahiko; born November 26, 1963) is a retired Japanese professional racing driver.

== Racing record ==
=== Complete Japanese Touring Car Championship (1994-) results ===
Year	Team	Car	1	2	3	4	5	6	7	8	9	10	11	12	13	14	15	16	17	18	DC	Pts
1994	Object T	Honda Civic Ferio	AUT; 1; 19	AUT; 2; 14	SUG; 1; 16	SUG; 2; 10	TOK; 1; 16	TOK; 2; 15	SUZ; 1; 13	SUZ; 2; 13	MIN; 1; 11	MIN; 2; 12	AID; 1; 15	AID; 2; 16	TSU; 1 Ret	TSU; 2 DNS	SEN; 1; 15	SEN; 2; 12	FUJ; 1; 15	FUJ; 2; 17	29th	1
1995	Object T	Honda Civic Ferio	FUJ; 1 Ret	FUJ; 2; 11	SUG; 1	SUG; 2	TOK; 1	TOK; 2	SUZ; 1	SUZ; 2	MIN; 1	MIN; 2	AID; 1	AID; 2	SEN; 1	SEN; 2	FUJ; 1	FUJ; 2			NC	0
1996	Object T	Toyota Corona EXiV	FUJ; 1; 14	FUJ; 2; 14	SUG; 1 Ret	SUG; 2; 14	SUZ; 1; 14	SUZ; 2; 13	MIN; 1; 6	MIN; 2; 14	SEN; 1; 10	SEN; 2; 11	TOK; 1 Ret	TOK; 2; 12	FUJ; 1; 12	FUJ; 2; 12					17th	6
1997	Object T	Toyota Corona EXiV	FUJ; 1 C	FUJ; 2 C	AID; 1; 15	AID; 2; 11	SUG; 1 Ret	SUG; 2; 13	SUZ; 1; 9	SUZ; 2 Ret	MIN; 1 Ret	MIN; 2; 10	SEN; 1; 11	SEN; 2 DNS	TOK; 1; 7	TOK; 2; 12	FUJ; 1; 15	FUJ; 2; 7			16th	11

=== Complete JGTC results ===
(key)

Year	Team	Car	Class	1	2	3	4	5	6	7	DC	Pts
1998	Team Taeivon Ralliart	Mitsubishi FTO	GT300	SUZ; 3	FSW; C	SEN; 8	FSW; Ret	MOT; Ret	MIN; 6	SUG; 2	5th	37
1999	Racing Project Bandoh	Toyota Celica	GT300	SUZ; 1	FSW; 2	SUG; Ret	MIN; 3	FSW; Ret	TAI; 5	MOT; 2	3rd	70
2000	Racing Project Bandoh	Toyota Celica	GT300	MOT; 3	FSW; 16	SUG; 1	FSW; Ret	TAI; 3	MIN; 15	SUZ; 17	6th	44
