= Naoki Hattori =

Japanese racing driver (born 1966)

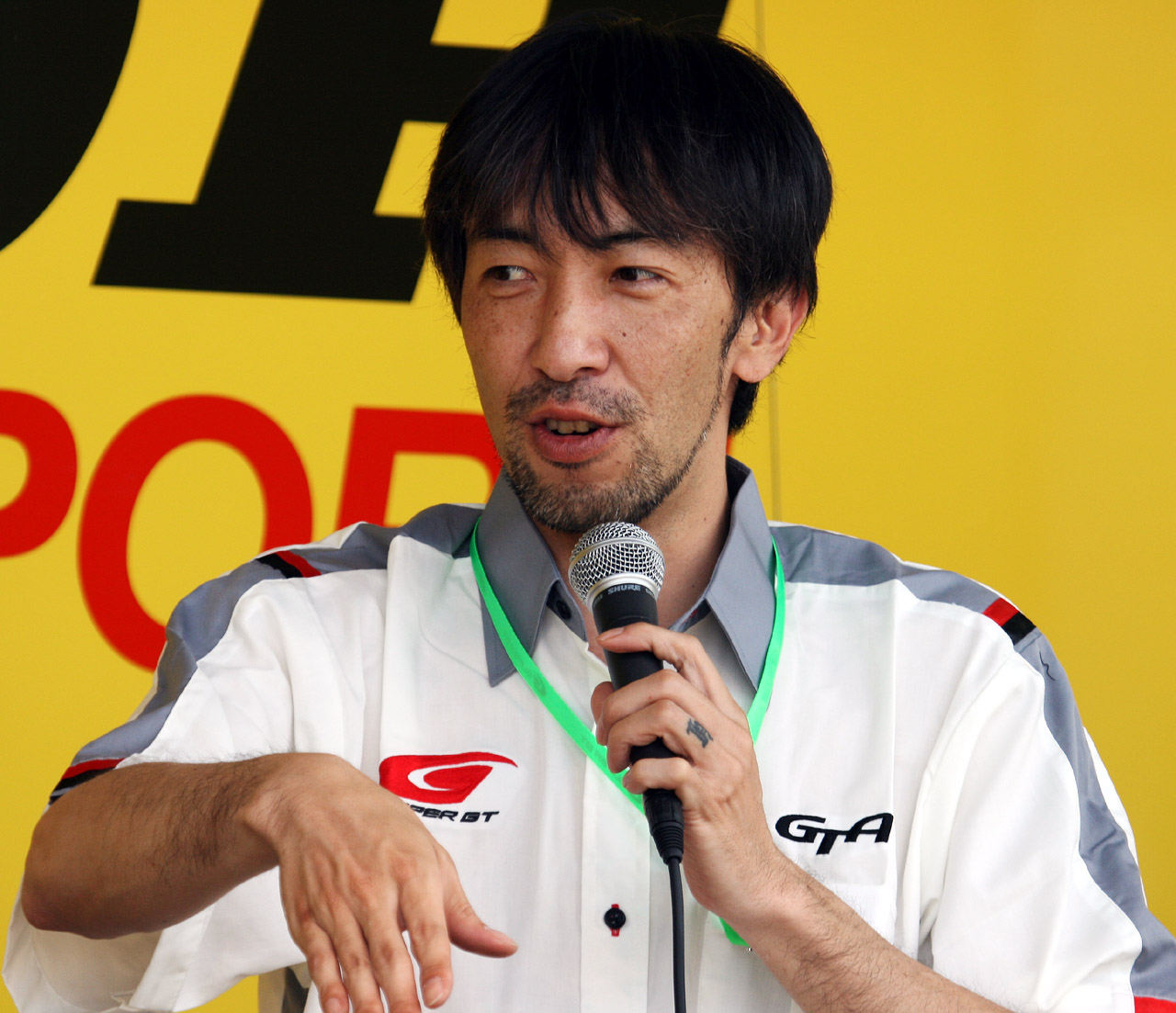
- Hattori in 2008
- Born: 13 June 1966 (age 60); Yokkaichi, Japan

Formula One World Championship career
- Nationality: (Japan) Japanese
- Active years: 1991
- Team: Coloni
- Entries: 2 (0 starts)
- Championships: 0
- Wins: 0
- Podiums: 0
- Career points: 0
- Pole positions: 0
- Fastest laps: 0
- First entry: 1991 Japanese Grand Prix
- Last entry: 1991 Australian Grand Prix

Naoki Hattori (服部 尚貴; born 13 June 1966) is a motoring journalist and racing driver from Japan.

== Career ==
After he won the Japanese Formula 3 championship in 1990, Hattori failed to pre-qualify for two Formula One Grands Prix with Coloni in 1991 as a late-season replacement for Pedro Chaves. He raced in Indy Lights in the mid-1990s, and in CART briefly in 1999 for Walker Racing with a best finish of 14th. In 1997, he tested a Formula One prototype, the F105, for Dome F1 at Suzuka and other Japanese race tracks, but Dome F1 never entered a Formula One Grand Prix.

Hattori competed regularly at the Japanese Touring Car Championship, winning the 1996 title with a Mooncraft Honda Accord after collecting five wins and three second-place finishes in 12 starts.

In 1991, driving a Nissan Skyline R32 GT-R for Nismo, Hattori, David Brabham and Anders Olofsson won the Spa 24 Hours.

Hattori is not related to compatriot and fellow racer Shigeaki Hattori. He has been one of the presenters of the Best Motoring video series.

== Racing record ==
=== Complete Japanese Formula 3 results ===
(key) (Races in bold indicate pole position)

Year	Team	Engine	1	2	3	4	5	6	7	8	9	10	11	DC	Pts
1988	VW Asia Motorsport	VW	SUZ; Ret	TSU; 12	FUJ; 12	SUZ; 4	SUG; 15	TSU; 8	SEN; 6	SUZ; DNS	NIS; 6	SUZ; 6		9th	6
1989	Le Garage Cox Racing Team	VW	SUZ; 9	FUJ; Ret	SUZ; 23	SEN; C	TSU; 3	SUG; Ret	**TSU**; 1	SUZ; 6	NIS; 18	SUZ; 6	SUZ; 3	4th	18
1990	Kawai Steel Le Garage Cox Racing	Mugen	SUZ; 2	FUJ; 2	**SUZ**; Ret	TSU; 1	SEN; 4	SUG; 1	TSU; 2	**SUZ**; 1	NIS; 3	SUZ; 6		1st	52

=== Complete Japanese Formula 3000 Championship/Formula Nippon results ===
(key) (Races in bold indicate pole position) (Races in italics indicate fastest lap)

Year	Entrant	1	2	3	4	5	6	7	8	9	10	11	DC	Points
1991	Le Garage Cox Racing Mooncraft	SUZ; Ret	AUT; 13	FUJ; 10	MIN; 15	SUZ; Ret	SUG; 5	FUJ; 10	SUZ; 6	FUJ; C	SUZ; Ret	FUJ; 12	19th	3
1992	Le Garage Cox Racing Mooncraft	SUZ; 4	FUJ; Ret	MIN; 5	SUZ; 3	AUT; 6	SUG; 15	FUJ; 10	FUJ; 7	SUZ; 13	FUJ; 5	SUZ; 1	5th	21
1993	Le Garage Cox Racing Mooncraft	SUZ; 8	FUJ; Ret	MIN; 5	SUZ; 11	AUT; C	SUG; 7	FUJ; C	FUJ; 5	SUZ; 20	FUJ; 11	SUZ; 8	15th	4
1994	Team LeMans	SUZ; 4	FUJ; 12	MIN; 6	**SUZ**; 3	SUG; 3	FUJ; 3	SUZ; Ret	FUJ; Ret	FUJ; 5	SUZ; 1		5th	27
1995	Team LeMans	SUZ; 1	FUJ; C	MIN; Ret	SUZ; 7	SUG; 5	FUJ; Ret	TOK; 10	**FUJ**; Ret	SUZ; Ret			8th	11
1996	X Japan Racing Team LeMans	SUZ; 8	MIN; Ret	FUJ; 2	TOK; 3	SUZ; 3	SUG; 8	**FUJ**; 1	MIN; 3	SUZ; 1	FUJ; Ret		2nd	38
2000	Team 5ZIGEN	SUZ; 3	MOT; 7	MIN; 6	FUJ; 5	SUZ; 4	SUG; Ret	MOT; 7	FUJ; 8	MIN; 8	SUZ; 9		8th	10
2001	Team 5ZIGEN	**SUZ**; 1	MOT; 1	MIN; 5	FUJ; 1	SUZ; 8	SUG; 7	FUJ; 12	MIN; 6	MOT; Ret	SUZ; 10		2nd	33
2002	Team 5ZIGEN	SUZ; 6	FUJ; Ret	MIN; Ret	SUZ; 4	MOT; 6	SUG; 12	FUJ; 6	MIN; 6	MOT; 8	SUZ; 5		8th	9
2003	DoCoMo Team Dandelion Racing	SUZ; 8	FUJ; Ret	MIN; Ret	MOT; 11	SUZ; 8	SUG; 9	FUJ; 9	MIN; 4	MOT; 7	SUZ; 11		13th	3
2004	DoCoMo Team DandelionRacing	SUZ; 7	SUG; 7	MOT; Ret	SUZ; 10	SUG; 6	MIN; 10	SEP; 2	MOT; Ret	SUZ; 10			9th	7
2005	DoCoMo Team Dandelion Racing	MOT; 3	SUZ; 6	SUG; 6	FUJ; 10	SUZ; 7	MIN; 6	FUJ; 7	MOT; 7	SUZ; 14			12th	7

=== Complete JGTC/Super GT Results ===
(key) (Races in bold indicate pole position) (Races in italics indicate fastest lap)

Year	Team	Car	Class	1	2	3	4	5	6	7	8	9	DC	Pts
1994	Mooncraft	Nissan Silvia	GT1	FUJ; 4	SEN; 10	FUJ; Ret	SUG; 8	MIN; Ret					14th	14
1996	Team Lark	McLaren F1 GTR	GT500	**SUZ**; 1	**FUJ**; Ret	**SEN**; 15	FUJ; Ret	**SUG**; 1	**MIN**; 1				**2nd**	**60**
2000	Raybrig Team Kunimitsu with Mooncraft	Honda NSX	GT500	MOT; Ret	FUJ; 14	SUG; 10	FUJ; 7	TAI; 5	MIN; Ret	SUZ; DSQ			15th	13
2001	Team Impul	Nissan Skyline GT-R	GT500	TAI; 15	FUJ; Ret	SUG; 7							23rd	4
2001	Hitotsuyama Racing	McLaren F1 GTR	GT500				FUJ; 11	MOT; Ret	SUZ; Ret	MIN; 11			23rd	4
2002	Hitotsuyama Racing	McLaren F1 GTR	GT500	TAI; 13	FUJ; 8	SUG; 6	SEP; 8	FUJ; 13	**MOT**; 3	MIN; Ret	SUZ; Ret		17th	27
2003	Kraft	Toyota Supra	GT500	TAI; 9	FUJ; 5	SUG; 6	FUJ; 10	FUJ; 10	MOT; 12	AUT; 7	SUZ; 10		15th	24
2004	Kraft	Toyota Supra	GT500	TAI; 4	SUG; 5	SEP; 2	TOK; 9	**MOT**; 13	AUT; 8	SUZ; 16			10th	37
2005	Kraft	Toyota Supra	GT500	OKA; 9	FUJ; 3	SEP; 14	SUG; 10	MOT; 5	FUJ; 6	AUT; 9	SUZ; 13		12th	29
2006	Toyota Team Kraft	Lexus SC430	GT500	SUZ; 14	OKA; 12	FUJ; 1	SEP; 11	SUG; 7	SUZ; 3	MOT; 7	AUT; 9	FUJ; 2	9th	64
2007	Toyota Team Kraft	Lexus SC430	GT500	SUZ; 8	OKA; 9	FUJ; 7	SEP; 11	SUG; 9	SUZ; Ret	MOT; 9	AUT; 11	FUJ; 11	19th	14

=== Complete Japanese Touring Car Championship results ===
(key) (Races in bold indicate pole position) (Races in italics indicate fastest lap)

Year	Team	Car	Class	1	2	3	4	5	6	7	8	9	10	11	12	13	14	15	16	17	18	DC	Pts
1992	Mooncraft	Honda Civic	JTC-3	TAI; 3	AUT; 4	SUG; 7	SUZ; 2	MIN; Ret	TSU; 10	SEN; 1	FUJ; 2											**3rd**	**77**
1993	Mooncraft	Honda Civic	JTC-3	MIN; Ret	AUT; 1	SUG; 3	SUZ; 1	TAI; 1	TSU; Ret	TOK; 5	SEN; 3	FUJ; 1										**1st**	**93**
1994	Mooncraft	Honda Civic Ferio		AUT; 1	AUT; 2	SUG; 1; 9	SUG; 2; 11	TOK; 1; 10	TOK; 2; 6	SUZ; 1; 8	SUZ; 2; 7	MIN; 1; 3	MIN; 2; 10	AID; 1; 3	AID; 2; 4	TSU; 1 Ret	TSU; 2 Ret	SEN; 1; 4	SEN; 2; 2	FUJ; 1; 7	FUJ; 2; 12	7th	64
1995	Mooncraft	Honda Civic Ferio		FUJ; 1; 8	FUJ; 2; 7	SUG; 1; 22	SUG; 2 Ret	TOK; 1 Ret	TOK; 2 Ret	SUZ; 1; 15	SUZ; 2; 14	MIN; 1; 2	MIN; 2 Ret	AID; 1; 19	AID; 2; 10	SEN; 1; 7	SEN; 2; 9	FUJ; 1 Ret	FUJ; 2; 12			15th	26
1996	Mooncraft	Honda Accord		**FUJ**; **1**; 1	**FUJ**; **2**; 1	**SUG**; **1**; 1	SUG; 2; 4	SUZ; 1; 2	**SUZ**; **2**; 1	MIN; 1	MIN; 2	SEN; 1; 4	SEN; 2; 2	TOK; 1; 1	**TOK**; **2**; 2	FUJ; 1 DSQ	FUJ; 2 DSQ					**1st**	**125**
1997	Team Mugen	Honda Accord		FUJ; 1	FUJ; 2	AID; 1	AID; 2	SUG; 1	SUG; 2	SUZ; 1	SUZ; 2	MIN; 1	MIN; 2	SEN; 1	SEN; 2	TOK; 1	TOK; 2	**FUJ**; **1**; 2	**FUJ**; **2**; 2			14th	24

=== Complete Formula One results ===
(key)

Year	Entrant	Chassis	Engine	1	2	3	4	5	6	7	8	9	10	11	12	13	14	15	16	WDC	Points
1991	Coloni Racing Srl	Coloni C4	Cosworth V8	USA	BRA	SMR	MON	CAN	MEX	FRA	GBR	GER	HUN	BEL	ITA	POR	ESP	JPN; DNPQ	AUS; DNPQ	NC	0

=== Complete International Formula 3000 results ===
(key)

Year	Entrant	1	2	3	4	5	6	7	8	DC	Points
1995	Auto Sport Racing	SIL	CAT	PAU	PER	HOC	SPA; Ret	EST; Ret	MAG	NC	0

=== American open–wheel racing results ===
(key)

==== Indy Lights ====
Year	Team	1	2	3	4	5	6	7	8	9	10	11	12	13	14	Rank	Points	Ref
1997	Team Green	MIA; 13	LBH; WD	NAZ; 15	SAV; 5	STL; 14	MIL; 13	DET; 7	POR; 24	TOR; 6	TRO; 24	VAN; 15	LS; 20	FON; 6		**16th**	**32**	
1998	Team Green	MIA; 18	LBH; 3	NAZ; 7	STL; 8	MIL; 12	DET; 23	POR; 16	CLE; 17	TOR; 2	MIS; 16	TRO; 3	VAN; 17	LS; 5	FON; 17	**10th**	**66**	

==== CART ====
Year	Team	No.	1	2	3	4	5	6	7	8	9	10	11	12	13	14	15	16	17	18	19	20	Rank	Points	Ref
1999	Walker Racing	15	MIA; 25	MOT	LBH	NZR	RIO	STL	MIL	POR	CLE	ROA	TOR	MIS	DET; 16	MDO; 19	CHI	VAN; 27	LS; 14	HOU; 22	SRF; 20	FON; 19	**35th**	**0**	

Sporting positions
Preceded by Masahiko Kageyama	All-Japan Formula Three; Champion; 1990	Succeeded by Paulo Carcasci
Preceded by Steve Soper	Japanese Touring Car Championship; Champion; 1996	Succeeded by Osamu Nakako
