= Masami Kageyama =

Japanese racing driver

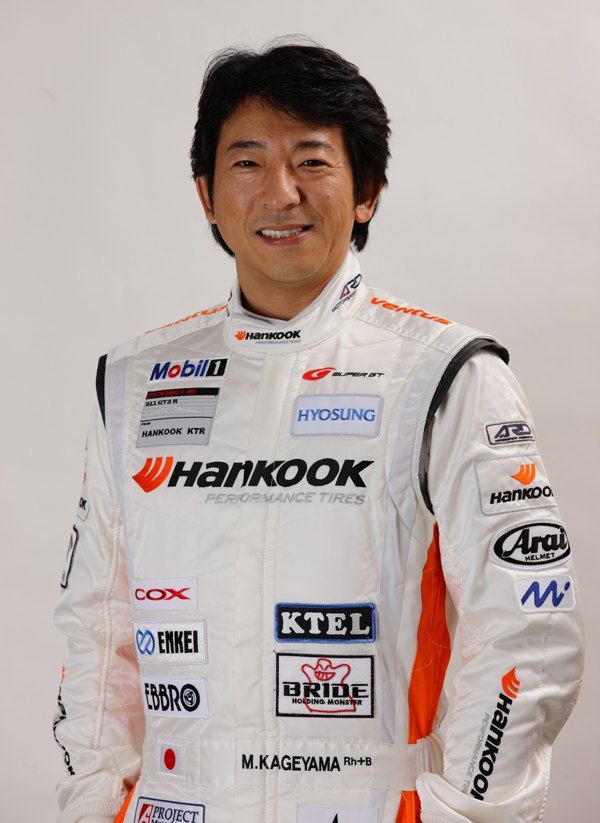
Kageyama in 2011

Masami Kageyama (影山 正美, Kageyama Masami; born May 2, 1967) is a Japanese racing driver from Kanagawa Prefecture. His older brother is Masahiko Kageyama who was also a successful racing driver in similar categories.

== Racing career ==
=== Early career - Japanese formula and touring cars ===
Kageyama began his career by winning the inaugural 1990 Formula Toyota championship. In 1991 he moved up to the All-Japan Formula Three Championship and finished fourth with one win. He embarked on a full-fledged touring car racing campaign in 1992, competing in the All Japan Touring Car Championship Class 3 in a Honda Civic, finishing ninth. He also continued in Japanese F3 but failed to finish in the points.

Kageyama continued in the same series and teams in 1993, finishing 11th in JTCC-C3 and 15th in F3 Japan. 1994 was his breakout year in Japanese F3 where he drove for the famous Tom's team and finished second in points with two poles, one win and six podium finishes. He also drove in the All Japan GT Championship (JGTC) and made two starts in Japanese Formula 3000 in 1994.

=== Formula Nippon and International GT cars ===
In 1995, Kageyama raced full-time in both Japanese F3000, where he finished 13th in points with the Advan Sport Pal team, and in the Japanese Touring Car Championship where he finished 10th in points driving a Toyota. In 1996, Kageyama only raced in JGTC in a Nissan 300ZX and in JTCC in a Toyota Corona EXiV, however he also made his 24 Hours of Le Mans debut in a Toyota Supra.

However, the team failed to finish. In 1997, Kageyama finished second in JGTC-GT500 in a Supra fielded by Toyota Team SARD. He also returned to Formula Nippon (formerly Japanese F3000) and finished fifth in the 1997 championship.

1998 was a tremendously successful year for Kageyama, as he finished second in Formula Nippon, finished tenth in the 1998 24 Hours of Le Mans in a factory-backed Nissan R390 GT1 and was the JGTC-GT500 champion in a factory Nissan Skyline GT-R. In 1999, his fortunes turned as he only managed ninth in points in his JGTC-GT500 Skyline and only competed in one Formula Nippon race.

=== 2000s ===
In the 2000 24 Hours of Le Mans, Kageyama's Team Dragon squad finished sixth overall in their Panoz LMP-1 Roadster-S. Kageyama also rebounded in JGTC and finished second in points in his Skyline GT-R. In 2001 Kageyama fell to seventh in JGTC and returned to Formula Nippon, finishing ninth in points. 2002 was a very disappointing JGTC season with Kageyama only finishing 28th in points. In 2003 however, he rebounded to fifth in points in his NISMO Skyline GT-R. In 2004 he stayed with the NISMO team as they switched cars to the new Nissan Fairlady Z. Kageyama finished ninth in points. In 2005, he dropped down to the GT300 class still driving a Fairlady Z, but switched teams to Endless Sports. He finished sixth in GT300. He improved to fourth in 2006 in the same car, team, and class. The same combination finished fifth in points in 2007.

Kageyama returned to Le Mans for the 2008 race but the Tōkai University Courage-Oreca LC70 he drove failed to finish. He switched teams in JGTC-GT300 to a Hankook-fielded Porsche 911 GT3 RSR and fell to 21st in points. The team improved to ninth in points in 2009 and also made two starts in the Asian Le Mans Series. The team and Kageyama fell back to 17th place in JGTC-GT300 in 2010, however they rebounded to finish third in 2011 and second in 2012. However, they fell back to 19th in 2013 and Kageyama left the team in 2014 for an APR Nissan GT-R GT3.

== Racing record ==
=== Complete Japanese Formula 3 results ===
(key) (Races in bold indicate pole position) (Races in italics indicate fastest lap)

| Year | Team | Engine | 1 | 2 | 3 | 4 | 5 | 6 | 7 | 8 | 9 | 10 | 11 | DC | Pts |
|---|---|---|---|---|---|---|---|---|---|---|---|---|---|---|---|
| 1990 | Tomei Sport | Nissan | SUZ | FUJ; 16 | SUZ; 20 | TSU; Ret | SEN; 16 | SUG; 11 | TSU; 16 | SUZ; DNQ | MIN; 22 | TSU; Ret | | NC | 0 |
| 1991 | Tomei Sport | Mugen | SUZ; 2 | FUJ; C | FUJ; 5 | SUZ; Ret | TSU; 6 | SEN; Ret | MIN; 13 | TSU; 1 | SUG; 14 | SUZ; 10 | SUZ; 7 | 4th | 18 |
| 1992 | Tomei Sport | Mugen | SUZ; 8 | TSU; Ret | FUJ; 15 | SUZ; Ret | SEN | AID; Ret | MIN; 9 | SUG; Ret | SUZ; 7 | SUZ; 8 | | NC | 0 |
| 1993 | Tomei Sport | Mugen | SUZ; 6 | TSU; 7 | FUJ; 13 | SUZ; 9 | SEN | TAI; 9 | MIN | SUG; 16 | SUZ; 8 | SUZ; Ret | | 15th | 1 |
| 1994 | TOM'S | Toyota | SUZ; 2 | FUJ; 5 | TSU; 2 | SUZ; 5 | SEN; 2 | TOK; 1 | MIN; 2 | TAI; 2 | SUG; 6 | SUZ; DNS | | 2nd | 41 |

=== Complete Japanese Touring Car Championship (1994-) results ===
| Year | Team | Car | 1 | 2 | 3 | 4 | 5 | 6 | 7 | 8 | 9 | 10 | 11 | 12 | 13 | 14 | 15 | 16 | 17 | 18 | DC | Pts |
|---|---|---|---|---|---|---|---|---|---|---|---|---|---|---|---|---|---|---|---|---|---|---|
| 1994 | Toyota Team Tom's | Toyota Corona | AUT; 1 | AUT; 2 | SUG; 1; 2 | SUG; 2 Ret | TOK; 1 | TOK; 2 | SUZ; 1 | SUZ; 2 | MIN; 1 | MIN; 2 | AID; 1 | AID; 2 | TSU; 1 | TSU; 2 | SEN; 1 | SEN; 2 | FUJ; 1 | FUJ; 2 | 21st | 12 |
| 1995 | Tsuchiya Engineering | Toyota Corolla Ceres | FUJ; 1; 4 | FUJ; 2 Ret | | | TOK; 1; 9 | TOK; 2; 13 | | | | | | | | | | | | | 10th | 34 |
| 1995 | Tsuchiya Engineering | Toyota Corona EXiV | | | SUG; 1 Ret | SUG; 2 DNS | | | SUZ; 1 Ret | SUZ; 2; 18 | MIN; 1 Ret | MIN; 2 Ret | AID; 1; 9 | AID; 2; 5 | SEN; 1; 11 | SEN; 2; 10 | FUJ; 1; 4 | FUJ; 2; 3 | | | 10th | 34 |
| 1996 | Tsuchiya Engineering | Toyota Corona EXiV | FUJ; 1; 9 | FUJ; 2; 9 | SUG; 1; 9 | SUG; 2; 6 | SUZ; 1; 16 | SUZ; 2; 5 | MIN; 1; 3 | MIN; 2; 7 | SEN; 1; 9 | SEN; 2; 14 | TOK; 1; 9 | TOK; 2; 6 | FUJ; 1 Ret | FUJ; 2 DNS | | | | | 11th | 39 |
| 1997 | Tsuchiya Engineering | Toyota Corona EXiV | FUJ; 1 C | FUJ; 2 C | AID; 1; 5 | AID; 2; 6 | SUG; 1; 9 | SUG; 2; 8 | SUZ; 1; 3 | SUZ; 2; 3 | MIN; 1; 5 | MIN; 2; 7 | SEN; 1; 5 | SEN; 2; 7 | TOK; 1; 6 | TOK; 2; 11 | FUJ; 1; 4 | FUJ; 2; 13 | | | 6th | 61 |

=== Japanese Top Formula Championship results ===
| Year | Entrant | 1 | 2 | 3 | 4 | 5 | 6 | 7 | 8 | 9 | 10 | DC | Points |
|---|---|---|---|---|---|---|---|---|---|---|---|---|---|
| 1994 | Team Le Mans | SUZ | FUJ | MIN | SUZ | SUG | FUJ | SUZ; 14 | FUJ | FUJ | SUZ; 11 | NC | 0 |
| 1995 | Advan Sport Pal | SUZ; 12 | FUJ; C | MIN; Ret | SUZ; Ret | SUG; Ret | FUJ; Ret | TOK; 3 | FUJ; 14 | SUZ; Ret | | 13th | 4 |
| 1996 | Advan Pal Checkers | SUZ; 10 | MIN; 5 | FUJ; Ret | TOK; 2 | SUZ; 17 | SUG; 15 | FUJ; 9 | MIN; 11 | SUZ; Ret | FUJ; Ret | 11th | 8 |
| 1997 | Navi Connection Racing Team | SUZ; 11 | MIN; 9 | FUJ; 11 | SUZ; 5 | SUG; 6 | FUJ; 4 | MIN; 7 | MOT; 2 | FUJ; 3 | SUZ; 4 | 5th | 19 |
| 1998 | Shionogi Team Nova | SUZ; 2 | MIN; 10 | FUJ; Ret | MOT; 3 | SUZ; 3 | **SUG**; 1 | FUJ; C | MIN; 6 | **FUJ**; 4 | SUZ; 1 | **2nd** | **38** |
| 1999 | Be Brides Impul | SUZ; Ret | MOT; Ret | MIN; 6 | FUJ; 12 | SUZ; 1 | SUG; Ret | FUJ; Ret | MIN; Ret | MOT; 4 | SUZ; 4 | 6th | 17 |
| 2001 | Cosmo Oil Racing Team Cerumo | SUZ; 4 | MOT; 5 | MIN; 6 | FUJ; 5 | SUZ; Ret | SUG; 11 | FUJ; 6 | MIN; 4 | MOT; 8 | SUZ; 7 | 9th | 12 |
| 2002 | Team LeMans | SUZ; 14 | FUJ; Ret | MIN | SUZ | MOT | SUG | FUJ | MIN | MOT | SUZ | NC | 0 |
| 2004 | Cosmo Oil Racing Team Cerumo | SUZ | SUG | MOT | SUZ | SUG | MIN; Ret | SEP; 11 | MOT; Ret | SUZ; 15 | | NC | 0 |

=== Complete JGTC/Super GT Results ===
(key) (Races in bold indicate pole position) (Races in italics indicate fastest lap)

| Year | Team | Car | Class | 1 | 2 | 3 | 4 | 5 | 6 | 7 | 8 | 9 | DC | Pts |
|---|---|---|---|---|---|---|---|---|---|---|---|---|---|---|
| 1997 | Toyota Team Sard | Toyota Supra | GT500 | SUZ; 2 | FUJ; 1 | SEN; 5 | FUJ; 1 | MIN; 13 | SUG; 7 | | | | 2nd | 67 |
| 1998 | Nismo | Nissan Skyline GT-R | GT500 | SUZ; 1 | FUJ; C | SEN; 1 | FUJ; 10 | MOT; 4 | MIN; 4 | SUG; 6 | | | **1st** | **67** |
| 1999 | Impul | Nissan Skyline GT-R | GT500 | SUZ; 10 | FUJ; 3 | SUG; 5 | MIN; 6 | FUJ; 5 | TAI; 10 | MOT; 7 | | | 7th | 40 |
| 2000 | Nismo | Nissan Skyline GT-R | GT500 | MOT; 1 | FUJ; 6 | SUG; Ret | FUJ; 4 | TAI; 3 | MIN; 3 | SUZ; 5 | | | **2nd** | **68** |
| 2001 | Nismo | Nissan Skyline GT-R | GT500 | TAI; 13 | FUJ; 4 | SUG; 10 | FUJ; 2 | MOT; Ret | SUZ; 3 | MIN; 2 | | | 4th | 53 |
| 2002 | Nismo | Nissan Skyline GT-R | GT500 | TAI; 12 | FUJ; 6 | SUG; 4 | SEP; 16 | FUJ; 14 | MOT; 17 | MIN; Ret | SUZ; 8 | | 19th | 19 |
| 2003 | Nismo | Nissan Skyline GT-R | GT500 | TAI; 8 | FUJ; 1 | SUG; 5 | FUJ; 2 | FUJ; 11 | MOT; 13 | AUT; 6 | SUZ; 4 | | 3rd | 65 |
| 2004 | Nismo | Nissan Fairlady Z | GT500 | TAI; 9 | SUG; Ret | SEP; 6 | TOK; 1 | MOT; 8 | AUT; 9 | SUZ; Ret | | | 9th | 39 |
| 2005 | Endless Sports | Nissan Fairlady Z | GT300 | TAI; 1 | FUJ; 9 | SEP; 3 | SUG; 5 | MOT; 4 | FUJ; 5 | AUT; Ret | SUZ; 10 | | 6th | 58 |
| 2006 | Endless Sports | Nissan Fairlady Z | GT300 | SUZ; 16 | TAI; 4 | FUJ; 13 | SEP; 18 | SUG; 2 | SUZ; 16 | MOT; 2 | AUT; 11 | FUJ; 3 | 4th | 62 |
| 2007 | Endless Sports | Nissan Fairlady Z | GT300 | SUZ; 1 | TAI; 7 | FUJ; 4 | SEP; 6 | SUG; 12 | SUZ; 5 | MOT; 23 | AUT; 3 | FUJ; 5 | 5th | 59 |
| 2008 | Hankook Ktr | Porsche 996 GT3-RS | GT300 | SUZ; 11 | TAI; 7 | FUJ; 17 | SEP; 11 | SUG; 9 | SUZ; Ret | MOT; 6 | AUT; 5 | FUJ; Ret | 21st | 18 |
| 2009 | Hankook Ktr | Porsche 996 GT3-RS | GT300 | TAI | SUZ; 1 | FUJ | SEP | SUG; 1 | SUZ | FUJ; 6 | AUT | MOT | 9th | 45 |
| 2010 | Hankook Ktr | Porsche 996 GT3-RS | GT300 | SUZ; 6 | TAI; 8 | FUJ; Ret | SEP; 16 | SUG | SUZ | FUJ; C | MOT | | 17th | 8 |
| 2011 | Hankook Ktr | Porsche 996 GT3-RS | GT300 | TAI; 14 | FUJ; 1 | SEP; 9 | SUG; 5 | SUZ; 2 | FUJ; 11 | AUT; 17 | MOT; 2 | | 3rd | 58 |
| 2012 | Hankook Ktr | Porsche 911 GT3-R | GT300 | TAI; 5 | FUJ; Ret | SEP; 1 | SUG; 4 | SUZ; 6 | FUJ; 1 | AUT; 3 | MOT; 7 | | 2nd | 75 |
| 2013 | Hankook Ktr | Porsche 911 GT3-R | GT300 | TAI; 8 | FUJ; 16 | SEP; Ret | SUG; 17 | SUZ; 10 | FUJ; 15 | FUJ | AUT; 5 | MOT; 11 | 19th | 11 |
| 2014 | Apr | Nissan GT-R NISMO GT3 | GT300 | TAI; Ret | FUJ; 10 | AUT; 23 | SUG; 7 | FUJ; 13 | SUZ; 11 | CHA; 12 | MOT; Ret | | 32nd | 5 |
| 2015 | Apr | Nissan GT-R NISMO GT3 | GT300 | TAI | FUJ; 16 | CHA | FUJ | SUZ | SUG | AUT | MOT | | NC | 0 |
| 2016 | Team Mach | Toyota 86 MC | GT300 | TAI | FUJ; 22 | SUG; Ret | FUJ; 14 | SUZ; Ret | CHA | MOT; Ret | MOT; 23 | | NC | 0 |
| 2017 | Dijon Racing | Nissan GT-R NISMO GT3 | GT300 | TAI | FUJ | AUT | SUG | FUJ | SUZ; Ret | CHA | MOT | | NC | 0 |

=== 24 Hours of Le Mans results ===
| Year | Team | Co-Drivers | Car | Class | Laps | Pos. | Class Pos. |
|---|---|---|---|---|---|---|---|
| 1996 | (Japan) Team SARD Toyota Co. Ltd. | (Japan) Masanori Sekiya (Japan) Hidetoshi Mitsusada | Toyota Supra LM | GT1 | 205 | DNF | DNF |
| 1998 | (Japan) Nissan Motorsports (United Kingdom) TWR | (Japan) Satoshi Motoyama (Japan) Takuya Kurosawa | Nissan R390 GT1 | GT1 | 319 | 10th | 9th |
| 2000 | (Japan) TV Asahi Team Dragon | (Japan) Toshio Suzuki (Japan) Masahiko Kageyama | Panoz LMP-1 Roadster-S-Élan | LMP900 | 340 | 6th | 6th |
| 2008 | (Japan) Tōkai University (Japan) YGK Power | (Japan) Toshio Suzuki (Japan) Haruki Kurosawa | Courage-Oreca LC70-YGK | LMP1 | 185 | DNF | DNF |
