= Ryo Michigami =

Japanese racing driver

Ryō Michigami
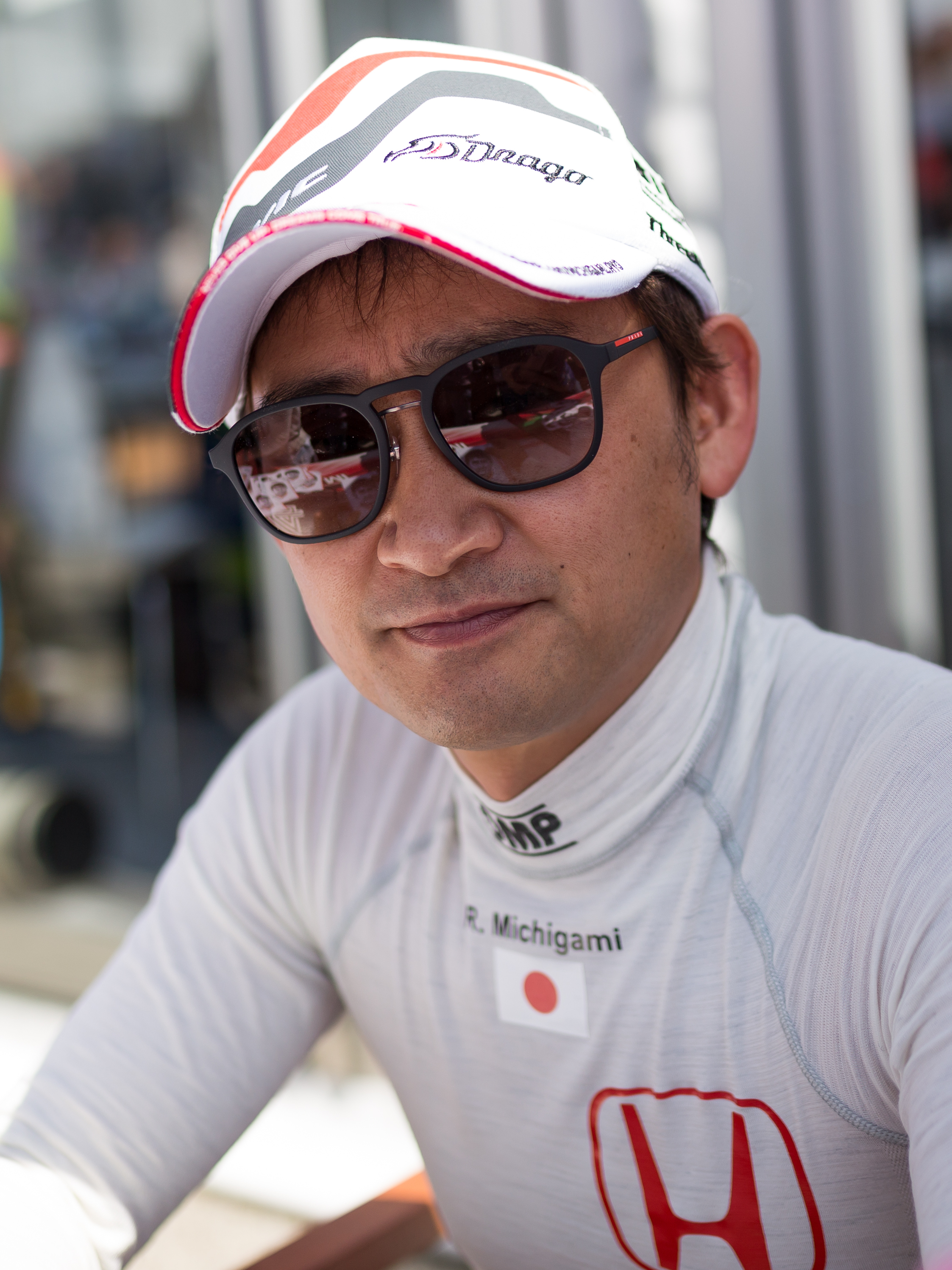
- Michigami in 2017
- Nationality: (Japan) Japanese
- Born: March 1, 1973 (age 53) Nara, Japan

Super GT career
- Debut season: 1995
- Current team: Yogibo Drago Corse
- Car number: 34
- Former teams: Nakajima Racing
- Starts: 125
- Wins: 8
- Best finish: 1st in 2000

Previous series
- 1995-1994 2006, 2004-1998: All-Japan Formula Three; Formula Nippon

Championship titles
- 2000 1993: Japan GT Championship; JAF Japan Formula 4

Ryō Michigami (道上龍, Michigami Ryō; born March 1, 1973 in Nara) is a Japanese racing driver. He last drove a Honda NSX GT3 Evo for Yogibo Drago Corse in Super GT in the 2021 Super GT Season. He won the All Japan Grand Touring Car Championship in 2000.

Michigami competed in the GT500 category of the Super GT series in 1995 and then from 1998 to 2013. He drove for Mugen from 1998 to 2002, for Dome from 2003 to 2009, and for Nakajima Racing from 2010 to 2013. Apart from 1995, he always drove for Honda teams, and became Honda's first champion in the series in 2000. He also won the Suzuka 1000 km three times; in 1999, 2003 and 2004.

After his initial retirement, Michigami formed the Drago Corse team, which competed in Super GT's GT500 class in 2015 and 2016 before withdrawing from the series. Michigami and the Drago Corse team would return to Super GT in 2018, albeit competing in the GT300 class with the NSX GT3. This marked Michigami's return as a full-time competitor, and his first season as a driver-owner in the series. Drago Corse also competed in All-Japan Formula Three Championship as the ThreeBond Racing team.

In 2017, Michigami drove a factory Honda Civic in the World Touring Car Championship. He became the first Japanese driver in the series to finish on the podium at the Race of Macau.

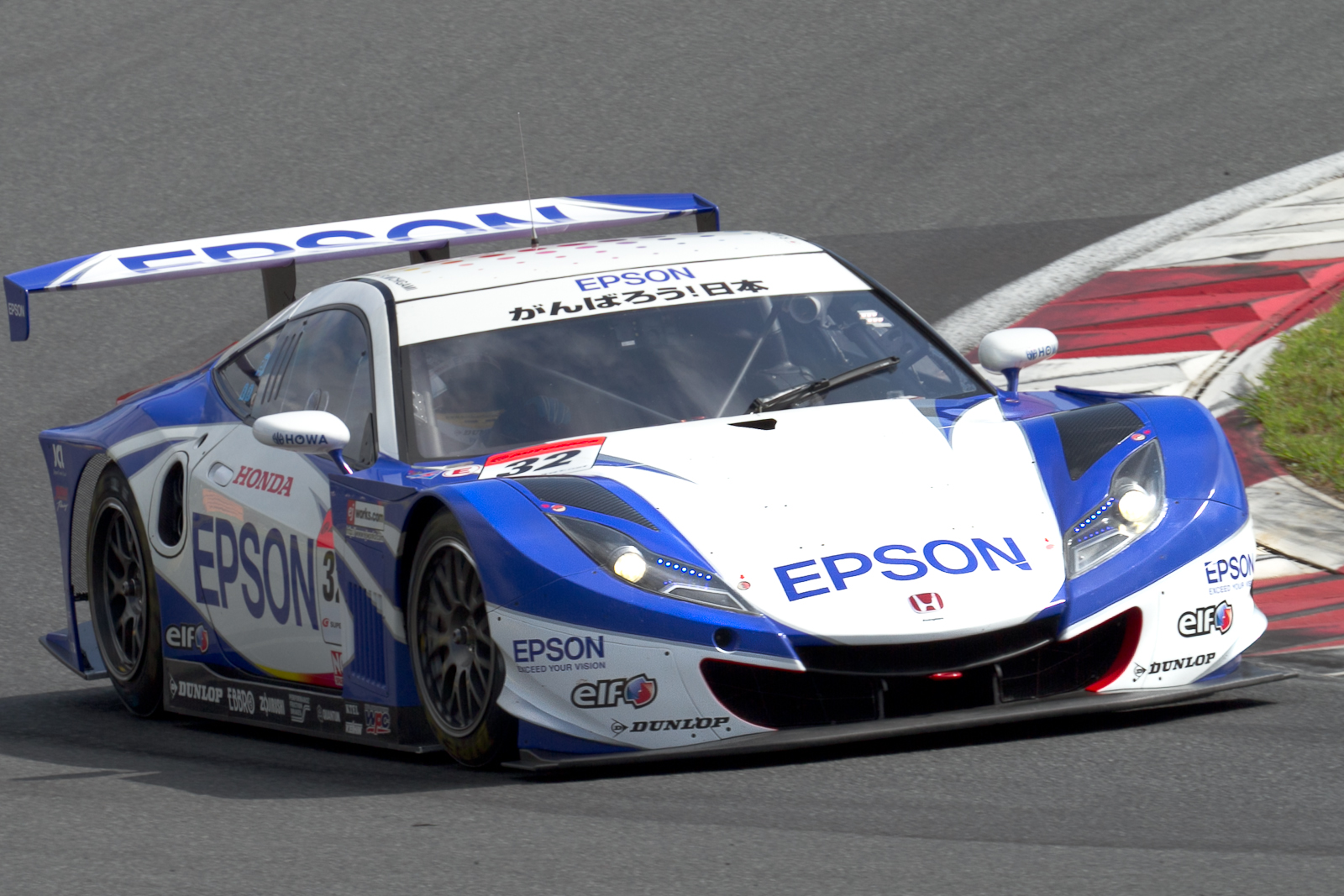
Michigami driving the Honda HSV-010 GT for Nakajima Racing in 2011.

== Racing record ==
=== Complete Japanese Formula 3 results ===
(key) (Races in bold indicate pole position) (Races in italics indicate fastest lap)

Year	Team	Engine	1	2	3	4	5	6	7	8	9	10	DC	Pts
1994	Daiichi Now Motor Sports	Toyota	**SUZ**; 1	FUJ; 7	TSU; 9	SUZ; 3	SEN; Ret	TOK; 5	MIN; 7	TAI; 9	SUG; 9	SUZ; 3	5th	19
1995	Daiichi Now Motor Sports	Toyota	SUZ; 3	FUJ; C	**TSU**; 3	MIN; 4	SUZ; Ret	TAI; 3	SUG; 3	FUJ; 5	SUZ; 4	SEN; 4	4th	25

=== Complete Japanese Touring Car Championship results ===
(key) (Races in bold indicate pole position) (Races in italics indicate fastest lap)

Year	Team	Car	1	2	3	4	5	6	7	8	9	10	11	12	13	14	15	16	DC	Pts
1996	Team Mugen	Honda Accord	FUJ; 1	FUJ; 2	SUG; 1	SUG; 2	SUZ; 1	SUZ; 2	MIN; 1	MIN; 2	SEN; 1	SEN; 2	TOK; 1	TOK; 2	FUJ; 1 Ret	FUJ; 2 DNS			NC	0
1997	Mooncraft	Honda Accord	FUJ; 1 C	**FUJ**; **2** C	TAI; 1; 3	TAI; 2; 3	SUG; 1 Ret	SUG; 2 Ret	SUZ; 1; 5	SUZ; 2; 4	MIN; 1; 2	MIN; 2; 2	SEN; 1; 13	SEN; 2; 2	TOK; 1; 5	TOK; 2; 3	FUJ; 1; 5	FUJ; 2; 12	5th	88

=== Complete JGTC/Super GT results ===
(key) (Races in bold indicate pole position) (Races in italics indicate fastest lap)

Year	Team	Car	Class	1	2	3	4	5	6	7	8	9	DC	Pts
1995	Team Kunimitsu	Porsche 964	GT500	SUZ	FUJ	SEN	FUJ; 14	SUG; 12	MIN; 8				25th	3
1998	Mugen	Honda NSX	GT500	SUZ; Ret	FUJ; C	**SEN**; Ret	FUJ; 5	**MOT**; 1	MIN; 11	**SUG**; 1			4th	48
1999	Mugen	Honda NSX	GT500	SUZ; 14	FUJ; 12	SUG; 3	MIN; 3	FUJ; 9	TAI; 16	MOT; 4			10th	36
2000	Mugen	Honda NSX	GT500	MOT; 2	FUJ; 8	SUG; 2	FUJ; 10	TAI; 2	MIN; 4	SUZ; 2			1st	74
2001	Mugen	Honda NSX	GT500	**TAI**; 1	FUJ; 8	SUG; 4	FUJ; 5	MOT; 12	SUZ; 2	MIN; 12			3rd	56
2002	Mugen	Honda NSX	GT500	TAI	FUJ	SUG	SEP	FUJ; 11	MOT; 16	MIN; 1	SUZ; 10		18th	24
2003	Dome Racing Team	Honda NSX	GT500	TAI; 3	FUJ; Ret	SUG; 7	FUJ; 8	FUJ; 1	MOT; 14	AUT; Ret	SUZ; 2		7th	55
2004	Dome Racing Team	Honda NSX	GT500	TAI; 12	SUG; 12	SEP; 8	TOK; 8	MOT; 15	AUT; 14	SUZ; 12			14th	6
2005	Dome	Honda NSX	GT500	OKA; 7	FUJ; 13	SEP; 7	SUG; Ret	MOT; 2	FUJ; 11	AUT; 5	SUZ; 6		10th	37
2006	Dome	Honda NSX	GT500	SUZ; 4	**OKA**; 1	FUJ; Ret	SEP; 6	SUG; Ret	SUZ; Ret	MOT; 5	**AUT**; 2	FUJ; 7	3rd	76
2007	Dome Racing Team	Honda NSX	GT500	SUZ; 13	**OKA**; 7	**FUJ**; 11	**SEP**; Ret	**SUG**; 2	SUZ; 12	**MOT**; 1	AUT; 5	FUJ; 10	4th	63
2008	Dome Racing Team	Honda NSX	GT500	SUZ; 7	OKA; 12	**FUJ**; 3	SEP; 3	**SUG**; 1	SUZ; 12	MOT; 8	AUT; 7	FUJ; 14	6th	60
2009	Dome Project	Honda NSX	GT500	OKA; 2	SUZ; 5	FUJ; 13	SEP; 12	SUG; 3	SUZ; 4	FUJ; 8	AUT; 5	MOT; 10	6th	50
2010	Nakajima Racing	Honda HSV-010 GT	GT500	SUZ; 10	OKA; 11	FUJ; 9	SEP; Ret	SUG; 11	SUZ; 7	FUJ; C	MOT; 9		14th	9
2011	Nakajima Racing	Honda HSV-010 GT	GT500	OKA; 10	FUJ; 15	SEP; 12	SUG; 3	SUZ; 13	FUJ; 12	AUT; 8	MOT; 5		12th	21
2012	Nakajima Racing	Honda HSV-010 GT	GT500	OKA; Ret	**FUJ**; 11	SEP; 11	SUG; 11	SUZ; Ret	FUJ; 14	AUT; 2	MOT; 3		14th	26
2013	Nakajima Racing	Honda HSV-010 GT	GT500	OKA; 11	FUJ; 13	SEP; 12	SUG; 8	SUZ; 13	FUJ; Ret	AUT; 10	MOT; 11		15th	4
2014	Team Mugen	Honda CR-Z	GT300	OKA	FUJ	AUT	SUG	FUJ	SUZ; 8	BUR	MOT		NC	0
2018	Modulo Drago Corse	Honda NSX GT3	GT300	OKA; Ret	FUJ; 8	SUZ; 26	CHA; 9	FUJ; DNS	SUG; 4	AUT; 3	MOT; 14		14th	24
2019	Modulo Drago Corse	Honda NSX GT3 Evo	GT300	OKA; 9‡	FUJ; 26	SUZ; 7	CHA; 10	FUJ; 3	AUT; 11	SUG; 13	MOT; 24		17th	19
2020	Modulo Drago Corse	Honda NSX GT3 Evo	GT300	FUJ; 8	FUJ; 7	SUZ; 19	MOT; 10	FUJ; 13	SUZ; 27	MOT; 14	FUJ; 17		22nd	8
2021	Yogibo Drago Corse	Honda NSX GT3 Evo	GT300	OKA; 16	FUJ; 19	MOT; 17	SUZ; 13	SUG; 6	AUT; 22	MOT; 12	FUJ; 11		23rd	5

^{‡} Half points awarded as less than 75% of race distance was completed.

=== Complete Formula Nippon results ===
(key) (Races in bold indicate pole position) (Races in italics indicate fastest lap)

Year	Team	1	2	3	4	5	6	7	8	9	10	DC	Pts
1997	Funai Super Aguri	SUZ	MIN	FUJ	SUZ	SUG	FUJ	MIN	MOT	FUJ	SUZ; Ret	NC	0
1998	Jaccs Mooncraft M.S.P	SUZ; 7	MIN; 3	FUJ; 4	MOT; 9	SUZ; Ret	SUG; Ret	FUJ	MIN; Ret	FUJ; Ret	SUZ; 3	9th	11
1999	Speedmaster Mooncraft	SUZ; 6	MOT; 8	MIN; 7	FUJ; 8	SUZ; Ret	SUG; Ret	FUJ; 7	MIN; Ret	MOT; 2	SUZ; 5	10th	9
2000	NTT Docomo Dandelion Racing	SUZ; Ret	MOT; 13	MIN; Ret	FUJ; Ret	SUZ; 10	SUG; Ret	MOT; 8	FUJ; 7	MIN; 9	SUZ; Ret	NC	0
2001	Mooncraft	SUZ	MOT; Ret	MIN; 10	FUJ; 3	SUZ; 2	SUG; 3	FUJ; Ret	MIN; Ret	MOT; 3	SUZ; 3	6th	22
2002	Team 5ZIGEN	SUZ; 4	FUJ; DNS	MIN	SUZ	MOT; 4	SUG; 3	FUJ; 4	MIN; 3	MOT; 12	SUZ; 11	6th	11
2003	Team 5ZIGEN	**SUZ**; 16	FUJ; 3	MIN; 4	MOT; 5	SUZ; 4	SUG; Ret	FUJ; Ret	MIN; Ret	MOT; 13	SUZ; 6	9th	13
2004	Yellow Hat Kondo Racing Team	SUZ; 3	SUG; 5	MOT; 6	SUZ; Ret	SUG; Ret	MIN; 11	SEP; 8	MOT; 10	SUZ; 13		10th	7
2006	Team 5ZIGEN	FUJ; 20	SUZ; 18	MOT; 7	SUZ; Ret	AUT; 11	FUJ; 15	SUG; 12	MOT; Ret	SUZ; 11		NC	0

=== 24 Hours of Le Mans results ===
Year	Team	Co-Drivers	Car	Class	Laps	Pos.	Class Pos.
2004	(Japan) Kondo Racing	(Japan) Hiroki Katoh (Japan) Ryo Fukuda	Dome S101-Mugen	LMP1	206	DNF	DNF
2005	(Japan) Jim Gainer International	(Japan) Seiji Ara (Japan) Katsutomo Kaneishi	Dome S101hb-Mugen	LMP1	193	DNF	DNF

=== Complete World Touring Car Championship results ===
(key) (Races in bold indicate pole position) (Races in italics indicate fastest lap)

Year	Team	Car	1	2	3	4	5	6	7	8	9	10	11	12	13	14	15	16	17	18	19	20	21	22	DC	Points
2016	Honda Racing Team JAS	Honda Civic WTCC	FRA; 1	FRA; 2	SVK; 1	SVK; 2	HUN; 1	HUN; 2	MAR; 1	MAR; 2	GER; 1	GER; 2	RUS; 1	RUS; 2	POR; 1	POR; 2	ARG; 1	ARG; 2	JPN; 1; 11	JPN; 2; 17	CHN; 1	CHN; 2	QAT; 1	QAT; 2	NC	0
2017	Honda Racing Team JAS	Honda Civic WTCC	MAR; 1 Ret	MAR; 2; 10	ITA; 1 Ret	ITA; 2 Ret	HUN; 1; 11	HUN; 2; 13	GER; 1; 11	GER; 2 Ret	**POR**; **1** Ret	POR; 2; 13	ARG; 1; 10	ARG; 2; 11	CHN; 1 DSQ	CHN; 2 DSQ	JPN; 1; 10	JPN; 2 Ret	MAC; 1; 3	MAC; 2; 15	QAT; 1; 14	QAT; 2; 10			14th	20

Sporting positions
Preceded by Érik Comas	All-Japan Grand Touring Car Champion (GT500); 2000	Succeeded by Hironori Takeuchi; Yuji Tachikawa
