= 1996 Japanese Touring Car Championship =

Seasons
- ← 1995 1997 →

The 1996 Japanese Touring Car Championship season was the 12th edition of the series. It began at Fuji Speedway on 7 April and finished after seven events, also at Fuji Speedway on 3 November. The championship was won by Naoki Hattori, driving for Mooncraft.

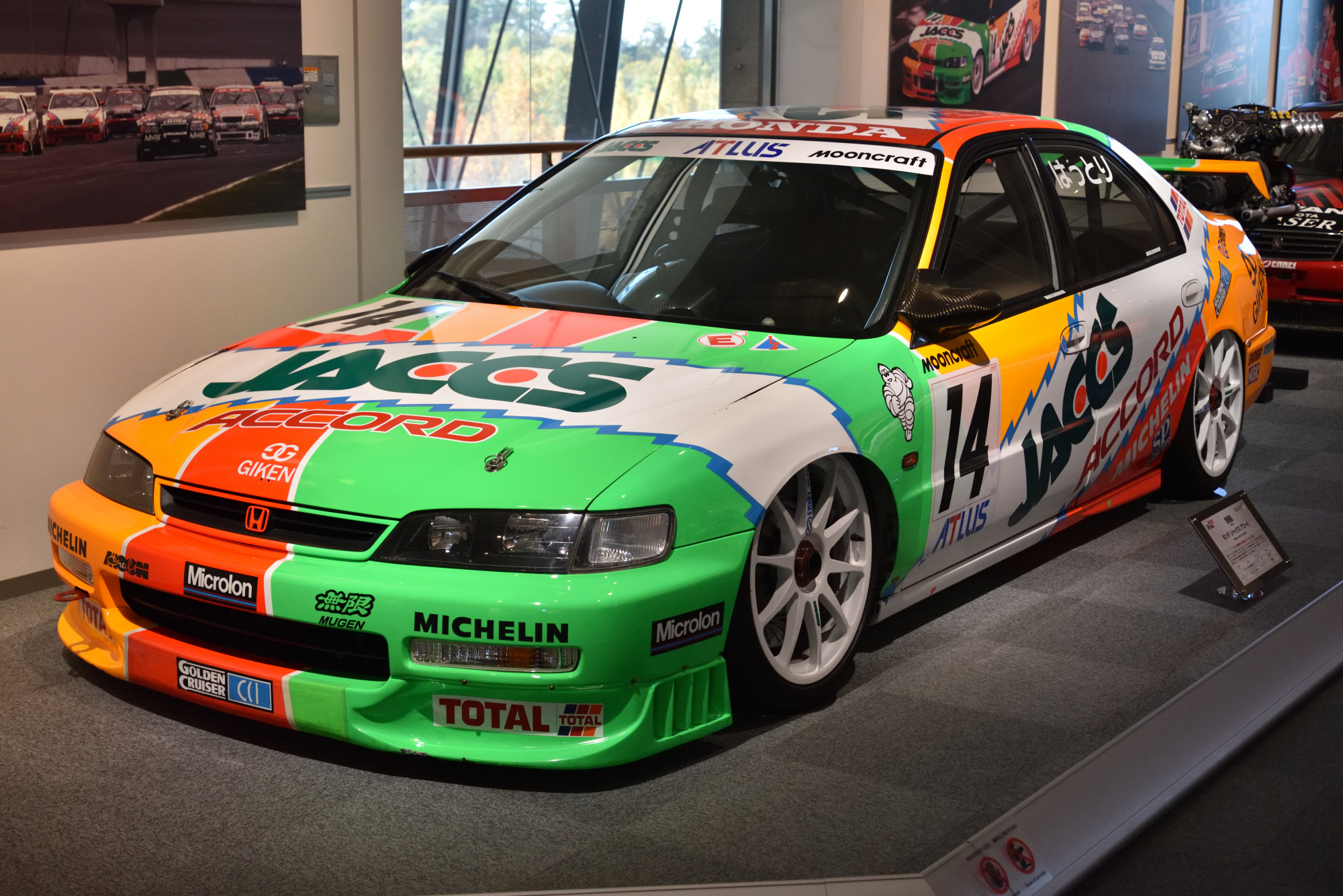
Naoki Hattori won the championship driving a Honda Accord.

== Teams & Drivers ==
Team	Car	No.	Drivers	Rounds
HKS Opel Team Japan	Opel Vectra	3	(Japan) Masahiro Hasemi	All
YTR Mazdaspeed	Mazda Lantis	6	(Japan) Yojiro Terada	1-2
YTR Mazdaspeed	Mazda Familia	6	(Japan) Yojiro Terada	5-7
Toyota Team FET	Toyota Corolla AE110	8	(Japan) Tatsuya Tanigawa	1-4
Toyota Team FET	Toyota Corolla AE110	8	(Japan) Morio Nitta	5-7
Mazdaspeed	Mazda Familia	9	(France) Franck Fréon	All
Team Advan with MOGG	BMW 318i	10	(Japan) Kazuo Mogi	1
Object T	Toyota Corona EXiV	11	(Japan) Takahiko Hara	All
Team Impul	Nissan Primera P11	12	(Japan) Kazuyoshi Hoshino	All
Asano Racing Service	BMW 318i	13	(Japan) Takeo Asano	5, 7
Mooncraft	Honda Accord	14	(Japan) Naoki Hattori	1-3, 5-7
Nakajima Planning	Honda Accord	15	(Japan) Takuya Kurosawa	1-3, 5-7
Castrol Mugen Honda	Honda Accord	16	(Japan) Osamu Nakako	1-3, 5-7
Castrol Mugen Honda	Honda Accord	33	(Japan) Ryō Michigami	7
Suzuki Bankin	Opel Vectra	17	(Japan) Tatsuhiko Kaneumi	All
Endless Sport	BMW 318i	18	(Japan) Mitsuhiro Kinoshita	All
Racing Project Bandoh	Toyota Corona EXiV	19	(Japan) Katsutomo Kaneishi	All
Hitotsuyama Racing	BMW 318i	20	(Japan) Takayuki Kinoshita	7
Hitotsuyama Racing	BMW 318i	21	(Japan) Yasushi Hitotsuyama	1-3, 7
Hitotsuyama Racing	BMW 318i	21	(Japan) Mikio Hitotsuyama	4-6
Nismo	Nissan Primera Camino P11	23	(Japan) Masahiko Kageyama	All
Nismo	Nissan Sunny	32	(Japan) Satoshi Motoyama	1-4
Nismo	Nissan Primera Camino P11	32	(Japan) Satoshi Motoyama	5-7
BMS Scuderia Italia	Nissan Primera GTe	24	(United Kingdom) Anthony Reid	7
Tsuchiya Engineering	Toyota Corona EXiV	25	(Japan) Masami Kageyama	All
Auto Tech Racing	BMW 318i	35	(Japan) Akihiko Nakaya	All
Toyota Team TOM's	Toyota Corona EXiV	36	(Japan) Masanori Sekiya	All
Toyota Team TOM's	Toyota Corona EXiV	37	(Germany) Michael Krumm	All
Toyota Team Cerumo	Toyota Corona EXiV	38	(Japan) Hironori Takeuchi	All
Toyota Team Cerumo	Toyota Corona EXiV	39	(France) Érik Comas	All
SYMS Racing	Subaru Impreza Sport Wagon	66	(Japan) Shunji Kasuya	1-4, 6-7
Dandelion Racing	Toyota Corona EXiV	68	(Japan) Tetsuya Tanaka	All
Team Something	Toyota Corolla AE110	72	(Japan) Masahiro Matsunaga	4, 7
Kosei J.P. Team Pures	Ford Mondeo	88	(Japan) Hisashi Wada	3-7

== Calendar ==
Round		Circuit	Date	Pole position	Fastest lap	Winning driver	Winning team	Ref
1	R1	(Japan) Fuji Speedway, Shizuoka	7 April	(Japan) Naoki Hattori	(Japan) Naoki Hattori	(Japan) Naoki Hattori	Mooncraft	
1	R2	(Japan) Fuji Speedway, Shizuoka	7 April	(Japan) Naoki Hattori	(Japan) Naoki Hattori	(Japan) Naoki Hattori	Mooncraft	
2	R3	(Japan) Sportsland SUGO, Miyagi	19 May	(Japan) Naoki Hattori	(Japan) Naoki Hattori	(Japan) Naoki Hattori	Mooncraft	
2	R4	(Japan) Sportsland SUGO, Miyagi	19 May	(Germany) Michael Krumm	(Germany) Michael Krumm	(Germany) Michael Krumm	Toyota Team TOM's	
3	R5	(Japan) Suzuka Circuit, Mie	2 June	(Japan) Takuya Kurosawa	(Japan) Takuya Kurosawa	(Japan) Osamu Nakako	Castrol Mugen Honda	
3	R6	(Japan) Suzuka Circuit, Mie	2 June	(Japan) Naoki Hattori	(Japan) Satoshi Motoyama	(Japan) Naoki Hattori	Mooncraft	
4	R7	(Japan) Mine Central Circuit, Yamaguchi	14 July	(Japan) Satoshi Motoyama	(Germany) Michael Krumm	(Japan) Kazuyoshi Hoshino	Team Impul	
4	R8	(Japan) Mine Central Circuit, Yamaguchi	14 July	(Japan) Masahiko Kageyama	(Japan) Kazuyoshi Hoshino	(Japan) Masahiko Kageyama	Nismo	
5	R9	(Japan) Sendai Hi-Land Raceway, Miyagi	8 September	(Japan) Takuya Kurosawa	(Japan) Naoki Hattori	(Japan) Akihiko Nakaya	Auto Tech Racing	
5	R10	(Japan) Sendai Hi-Land Raceway, Miyagi	8 September	(Japan) Takuya Kurosawa	(Japan) Naoki Hattori	(Japan) Takuya Kurosawa	Nakajima Planning	
6	R11	(Japan) Tokachi International Speedway, Hokkaidō	22 September	(Japan) Takuya Kurosawa	(Japan) Osamu Nakako	(Japan) Naoki Hattori	Mooncraft	
6	R12	(Japan) Tokachi International Speedway, Hokkaidō	22 September	(Japan) Naoki Hattori	(Japan) Osamu Nakako	(Japan) Osamu Nakako	Castrol Mugen Honda	
7	R13	(Japan) Fuji Speedway, Shizuoka	3 November	(Japan) Kazuyoshi Hoshino	(United Kingdom) Anthony Reid	(France) Érik Comas	Toyota Team Cerumo	
7	R14	(Japan) Fuji Speedway, Shizuoka	3 November	(Japan) Takuya Kurosawa	(United Kingdom) Anthony Reid	(United Kingdom) Anthony Reid	BMS Scuderia Italia	

== Championship Standings ==
Points were awarded 15, 12, 9, 7, 6, 5, 4, 3, 2, 1 to the top 10 finishers in each race, with no bonus points for pole positions or fastest laps. Drivers counted their ten best scores.

Pos	Driver	FUJ		SUG		SUZ		MIN		SEN		TOK		FUJ		Pts
1	(Japan) Naoki Hattori	**1**	**1**	**1**	4	2	**1**	WD	WD	4	2	1	**2**	DSQ	DSQ	125
2	(Japan) Osamu Nakako	2	2	2	3	1	4	WD	WD	2	3	2	1	DSQ	DSQ	115
3	(Germany) Michael Krumm	4	7	4	**1**	3	3	2	6	3	9	4	4	7	10	87
4	(Japan) Takuya Kurosawa	3	4	10	7	**5**	2	WD	WD	**Ret**	**1**	**3**	3	Ret	**DNS**	72
5	(Japan) Masahiko Kageyama	7	Ret	8	9	4	6	4	**1**	6	7	Ret	18	3	7	63
6	(Japan) Kazuyoshi Hoshino	Ret	Ret	5	16	9	17	1	2	Ret	4	10	Ret	**5**	2	61
7	(Japan) Masanori Sekiya	5	3	3	2	Ret	15	20	3	7	Ret	7	14	NC	9	55
8	(France) Érik Comas	18	6	6	10	Ret	Ret	13	8	5	6	Ret	8	1	3	52
9	(Japan) Satoshi Motoyama	Ret	8	Ret	DNS	8	7	**8**	9	Ret	5	6	5	4	4	46
10	(Japan) Akihiko Nakaya	13	13	7	Ret	Ret	Ret	17	5	1	19	5	7	9	8	40
11	(Japan) Masami Kageyama	9	9	9	6	16	5	3	7	9	14	9	6	Ret	DNS	39
12	(Japan) Katsutomo Kaneishi	6	5	14	Ret	6	8	10	12	13	Ret	NC	9	6	5	33
13	(United Kingdom) Anthony Reid													2	1	27
14	(Japan) Masahiro Hasemi	8	12	Ret	8	10	9	12	15	Ret	8	8	10	8	6	24
15	(Japan) Mitsuhiro Kinoshita	11	16	Ret	5	7	10	5	10	8	10	11	11	11	11	22
16	(Japan) Hironori Takeuchi	10	10	Ret	11	12	11	7	4	11	18	Ret	20	Ret	DNS	13
17	(Japan) Takahiko Hara	14	14	Ret	14	14	13	6	14	10	11	NC	12	12	12	6
18	(Japan) Hisashi Wada					Ret	16	9	19	DNS	Ret	DNS	DNS	DNS	DNS	2
19	(Japan) Tetsuya Tanaka	12	11	Ret	15	11	12	11	11	Ret	16	12	13	10	Ret	1
20	(Japan) Tatsuhiko Kaneumi	Ret	DNS	11	Ret	13	14	14	16	14	15	DNS	DNS	15	13	0
21	(Japan) Morio Nitta									12	13	13	15	13	DNS	0
22	(France) Franck Fréon	17	15	12	13	Ret	DNS	19	Ret	Ret	Ret	14	16	Ret	DNS	0
23	(Japan) Yasushi Hitotsuyama	15	Ret	Ret	12	17	Ret							Ret	15	0
24	(Japan) Mikio Hitotsuyama							15	17	Ret	12	Ret	17			0
25	(Japan) Yojiro Terada	Ret	Ret	13	Ret					16	17	NC	19	14	Ret	0
26	(Japan) Tatsuya Tanigawa	16	Ret	Ret	Ret	15	Ret	Ret	13							0
27	(Japan) Takayuki Kinoshita													NC	14	0
28	(Japan) Takeo Asano									15	DNS			16	16	0
29	(Japan) Shunji Kasuya	DNS	DNS	Ret	DNS	DNS	DNS	16	18			Ret	Ret	17	NC	0
30	(Japan) Masahiro Matsunaga							18	Ret					Ret	DNS	0
NC	(Japan) Kazuo Mogi	DNS	DNS													0
NC	(Japan) Ryō Michigami													DNS	DNS	0
Pos	Driver	FUJ		SUG		SUZ		MIN		SEN		TOK		FUJ		Pts

Colour	Result
Gold	Winner
Silver	Second place
Bronze	Third place
Green	Points classification
Blue	Non-points classification
Blue	Non-classified finish (NC)
Purple	Retired, not classified (Ret)
Red	Did not qualify (DNQ)
Red	Did not pre-qualify (DNPQ)
Black	Disqualified (DSQ)
White	Did not start (DNS)
White	Withdrew (WD)
White	Race cancelled (C)
Blank	Did not practice (DNP)
Blank	Did not arrive (DNA)
Blank	Excluded (EX)

**Bold** - Pole
Italics - Fastest lap
