= 1987 Japanese Touring Car Championship =

Seasons
- ← 1986 1988 →

The 1987 All Japan Touring Car Champion was the 3rd edition of the series. It began at Mine on 21 March and finished after six events at Suzuka on 4 December. The championship was won by Naoki Nagasaka, driving for Object T.

== All Japan Touring Car Championship ==
=== Results ===
| Date | Round | Circuit | Winning drivers | | Winning team | Winning car |
| 21 March 1987 | Rd.1 | Mine | (Japan) Kuminitsu Takahashi | (Japan) Akihiko Nakaya | STP | Mitsubishi Starion |
| 20 June 1987 | Rd.2 | Sendai | (Japan) Kuminitsu Takahashi | (Japan) Akihiko Nakaya | STP | Mitsubishi Starion |
| 29 August 1987 | Rd.3 | Tsukuba | (Japan) Kiyoshi Misaki | (Japan) Naoki Nagasaka | Object T | Ford Sierra RS500 |
| 19 September 1987 | Rd.4 | Sugo | (Australia) Alan Jones | (Sweden) Eje Elgh | Toyota Team TOM’S | Toyota Supra Turbo |
| 14 November 1987 | Rd.5 | Fuji | (Germany) Klaus Ludwig | (Germany) Klaus Niedzwiedz | Eggenberger Motorsport | Ford Sierra RS500 |
| 04/12/87 | Rd.3 | Suzuka | (Japan) Kiyoshi Misaki | (Japan) Naoki Nagasaka | Object T | Ford Sierra RS500 |
