= Tokachi International Speedway =

Motor racing circuit in Sarabetsu, Japan

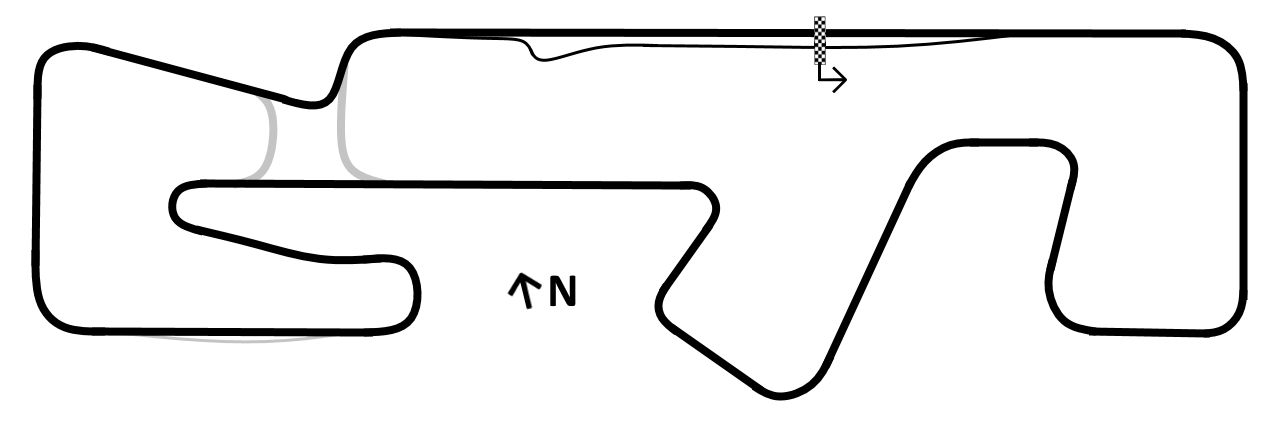
- Grand Prix Course (1993–present)
- Location: Sarabetsu, Hokkaido, Japan
- Coordinates: 42°37′52″N 143°17′31″E
- FIA Grade: 2 (Note: Tokachi International Speedway's Grade 2 license expired 31 December 2023.)
- Broke ground: 1992
- Opened: 5 May 1993; 32 years ago
- Major events: Former: Super Taikyu Series; Tokachi 24 Hours (1994–2008); All Japan Grand Touring Car Championship (2004); JTCC (1993–1997); Formula Nippon (1995–1996); Japanese F3 (1994)
- Website: http://tokachi.msf.ne.jp

Grand Prix Course (1993–present)
- Length: 5.091 km (3.163 mi)
- Turns: 15
- Race lap record: 1:41.100 ( (Germany) Michael Krumm, Reynard 95D, 1996, Formula Nippon)

Clubman Course (1993–present)
- Length: 3.406 km (2.116 mi)
- Turns: 10
- Race lap record: 1:15.517 ( (France) Érik Comas, Nissan Fairlady Z, 2004, GT500)

Junior Course (1993–present)
- Length: 1.700 km (1.056 mi)
- Turns: 7

Tokachi International Speedway (十勝インターナショナルスピードウェイ) is a motor racing circuit in Takikubo, Sarabetsu, Hokkaido, Japan.

The circuit has two main configurations, the Grand Prix Course (グランプリコース), 5.091 km (3.163 mi), and the Clubman Course (クラブマンコース), 3.406 km (2.116 mi).

== Events ==
Starting in 1994, there was a 24-hour N1 class race in July each year until 2008. In 2007, a Toyota Supra took the first win for a hybrid vehicle.

In 2004, a regular All Japan Grand Touring Car Championship race was held at the Clubman Course. And also a regular Formula Nippon race in 1995 and 1996 were held at the Grand Prix Course. In 2018 the D1 Grand Prix series held a regular race at the circuit.

The track is also used by the Renault Eurocup, and for karting.

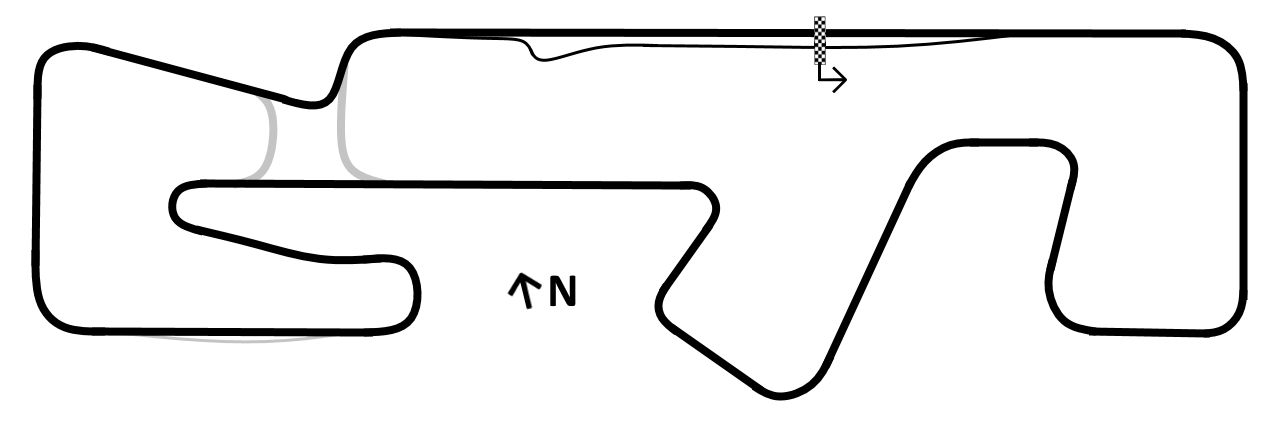
Grand Prix Course (1993–present)

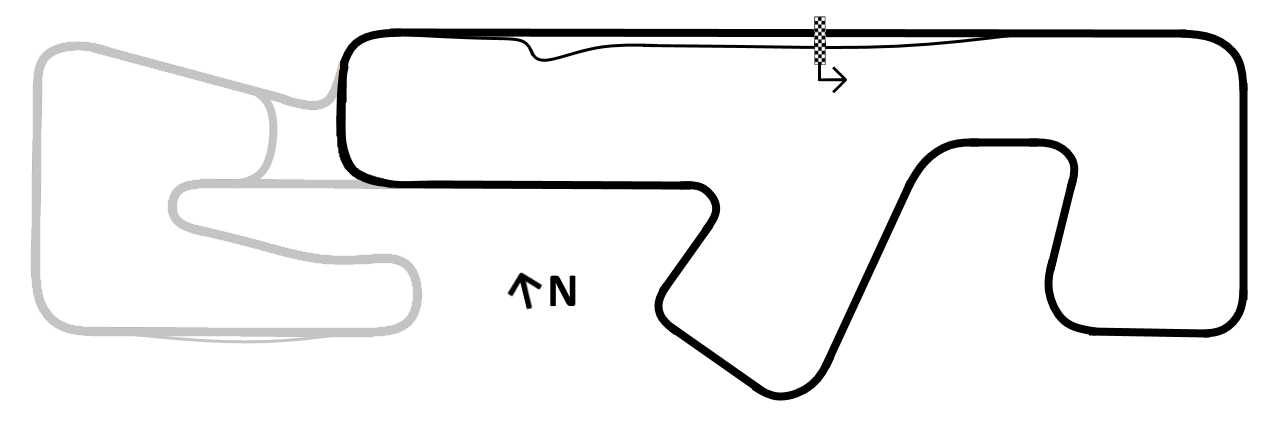
Clubman Course (1993–present)

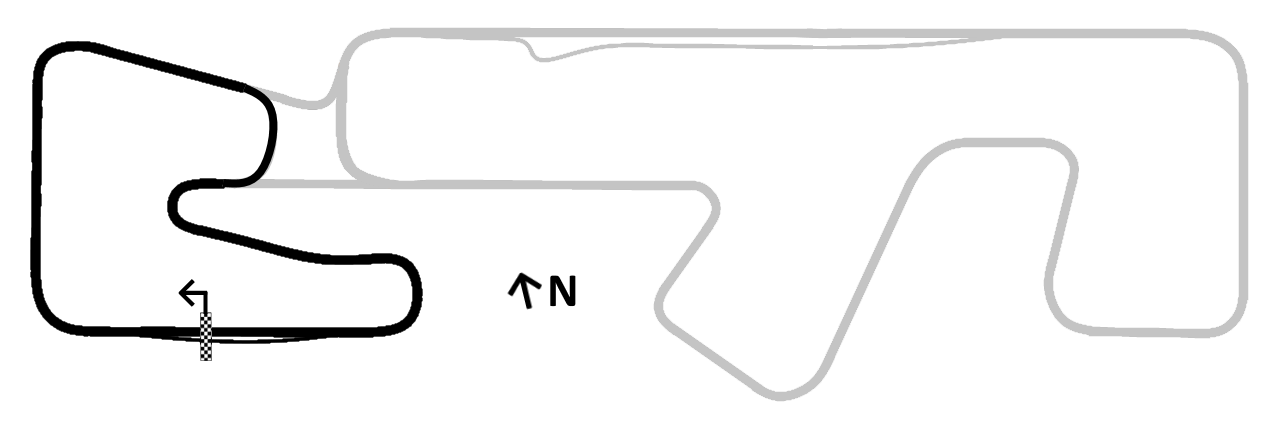
Junior Course (1993–present)

== Lap records ==
The unofficial all-time track record set during a race weekend is 1:39.625, set by Toranosuke Takagi in a Reynard 96D, during the qualifying for the 1996 Tokachi Formula Nippon round. The official lap record for the current circuit layout is 1:41.100, set by Michael Krumm during the same race. As of July 2004, the fastest official race lap records at the Tokachi International Speedway are listed as:

Category	Time	Driver	Vehicle	Event
Grand Prix Course (1993–present): 5.092 km (3.164 mi)
Formula Nippon	1:41.100	Michael Krumm	Reynard 95D	1996 Tokachi Formula Nippon round
F3000	2:07.010	Toranosuke Takagi	Reynard 94D	1995 Tokachi Japanese F3000 round
Group A	2:08.042	Kazuyoshi Hoshino	Nissan Skyline GT-R BNR32	1993 Tokachi JTCC round
Clubman Course (1993–present): 3.406 km (2.116 mi)
JGTC (GT500)	1:15.517	Érik Comas	Nissan Fairlady Z	2004 Tokachi JGTC round
Formula 3	1:15.920	Masemi Kageyama	TOM'S 034F	1994 Tokachi Japanese F3 round
JGTC (GT300)	1:21.392	Hiroki Yoshimoto	Vemac RD320R	2004 Tokachi JGTC round
Super Touring	1:22.901	Osamu Nakako	Honda Accord	1996 Tokachi JTCC round
