= Sendai Hi-Land Raceway =

Motor racing circuit in Sendai, Japan

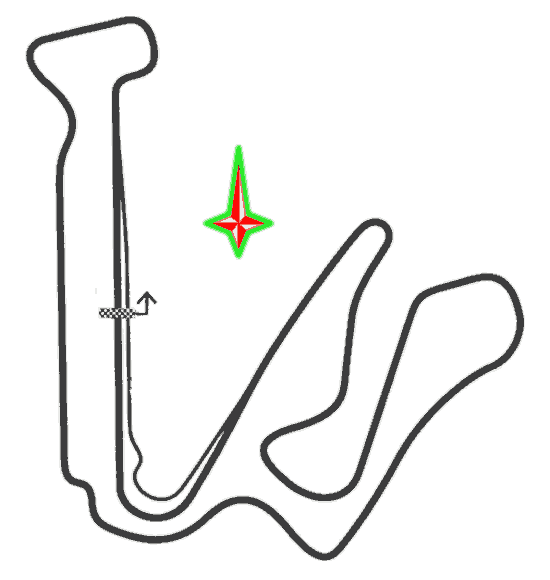
- Full Circuit (1996–2014)
- Location: Aoba-ku, Sendai, Miyagi Prefecture, Japan
- Coordinates: 38°17′14″N 140°37′27″E
- Opened: 21 September 1986; 39 years ago
- Closed: September 2014; 11 years ago
- Major events: Super Taikyu (2010); Japanese F3 (1994–1998, 2000–2002, 2004, 2007); JGTC (1994–1998); JTCC (1986–1997)

Full Circuit (1996–2014)
- Length: 4.030 km (2.504 mi)
- Turns: 18
- Race lap record: 1:38.080 ( (Japan) Hiroaki Ishiura, Dallara F307, 2007, F3)

Original Circuit (1986–1995)
- Length: 3.956 km (2.458 mi)
- Turns: 18
- Race lap record: 1:43.618 ( (Germany) Michael Krumm, TOM'S 034F, 1994, F3)

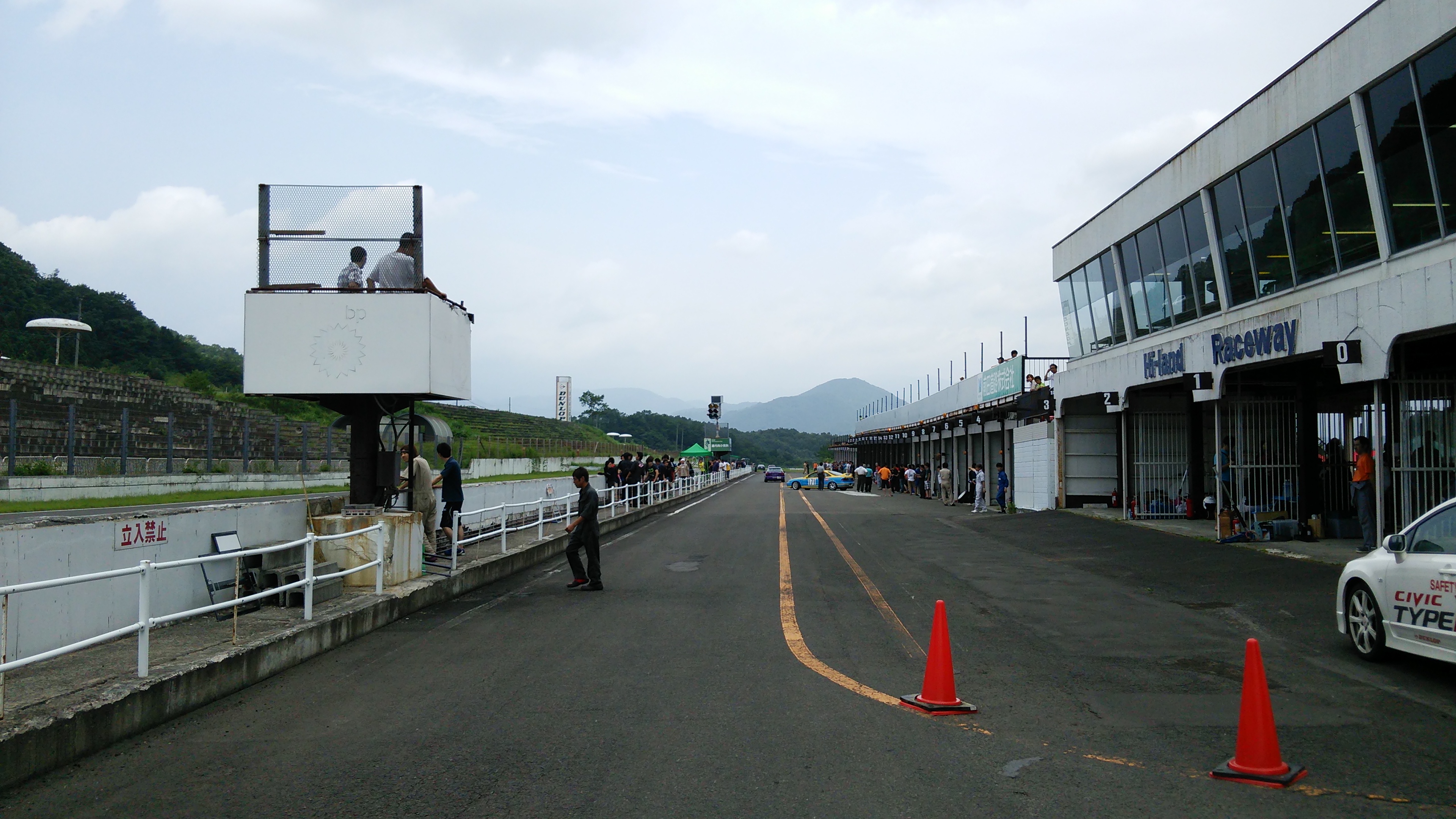
Main course at Sendai Hi-Land Raceway

Sendai Hi-Land Raceway was a 4.030 km (2.504 mi) motor racing circuit in 12 Hayasaka, Shinkawa, Aoba-ku, Sendai, Miyagi Prefecture, Japan.

In the 1990s, Sendai hosted rounds of the Japanese Touring Car Championship and Japanese Grand Touring Championship. It also hosted All-Japan Formula Three Championship races until 2007.

On October 17, 2010, the Japanese mountain race track hosted the sixth race in the 2010 Super Taikyu Endurance Series.

The raceway was damaged by earthquake in 2011 until it was closed in September 2014. As of today the former raceway is now a solar-power park.

1995 action film Thunderbolt has a car racing scene filmed at Sendai.

== Lap records ==
The fastest official race lap records at the Sendai Hi-Land Raceway are listed as:

Category	Time	Driver	Vehicle	Event
Full Circuit (1996–2014): 4.030 mi (6.486 km)
Formula Three	1:38.080	Hiroaki Ishiura	Dallara F307	2007 Sendai Japanese F3 round
Formula Toyota	1:46.551	Takuto Iguchi	Tom's FT30	2007 1st Sendai Formula Toyota round
GT1	1:47.791	Naoki Hattori	McLaren F1 GTR	1996 HiLand GT Championship
Super Touring	1:51.041	Naoki Hattori	Honda Accord	1996 Sendai JTCC round
Original Circuit (1986–1995): 3.956 mi (6.367 km)
Formula Three	1:43.618	Michael Krumm	TOM'S 034F	1994 Sendai Japanese F3 round
Group A	1:46.915	Kazuyoshi Hoshino	Nissan Skyline GT-R BNR32	1991 Sendai JTCC round
GT1	1:49.074	Michael Krumm	Toyota Supra	1995 HiLand GT&F3 Race
Super Touring	1:49.806	Joachim Winkelhock	BMW 318i	1995 Sendai JTCC round
