= 1994 All Japan Grand Touring Car Championship =

Motorsport season

Seasons
- ← 1993 1995 →

The 1994 All Japan Grand Touring Car Championship was the first full season of premier class GT racing in Japan to be promoted by the new GT Association (GTA). It was marked as well as the twelfth season of a JAF-sanctioned sports car racing championship, dating back to the All Japan Sports Prototype Championship. Recognized as the first season of what is now the Super GT series, the 1994 season introduced the familiar dual-class structure, and the Success Ballast handicap system that would become staples of the series in the years to come.

The premier class, GT1, featured an eclectic mix of Japanese-built GT cars such as the fleet of factory-operated Nissan Skyline GT-Rs, and later, the Toyota Supra GT from Team SARD - as well as foreign-made GT cars like the Porsche 911 RSR, the Lamborghini Countach, and the Ferrari F40 - mixed in with the Porsche 962C that was a holdover from the previous Group C era, and even a former WRC-spec Lancia 037 that entered as a one-off. The secondary class, GT2, featured privately built sports cars such as the ones used in the former Japan Super Sport Sedan Championship.

The GT1 class champion was the #1 Calsonic Skyline GT-R driven by Masahiko Kageyama, and the GT2 class champion was the #29 Korg Kegani Porsche 964 driven by Sakae Obata.

== Schedule ==
Round	Race	Circuit	Date
1	All Japan Fuji GT Race	(Japan) Fuji Speedway	May 1
2	HiLand GT&F3 Race	(Japan) Sendai Hi-Land Raceway	June 12
3	Japan Special GT-Cup	(Japan) Fuji Speedway	August 14
4	SUGO GT&F3	(Japan) Sportsland SUGO	September 11
5	Sanyo Shinpan Cup Grand Touring Car Endurance Race	(Japan) Mine Circuit	October 23

== Teams & Drivers ==
=== GT1 ===
Team	Make	Car	Engine	No.	Drivers	Tyre	Rounds
Calsonic Hoshino Racing	Nissan	Nissan Skyline GT-R	Nissan RB26DETT 2.6 L Twin Turbo I6	1	(Japan) Masahiko Kageyama	B	All
Team Zexel; Johnson NISMO	Nissan	Nissan Skyline GT-R	Nissan RB26DETT 2.6 L Twin Turbo I6	2	(Japan) Toshio Suzuki	B	All
Team Zexel; Johnson NISMO	Nissan	Nissan Skyline GT-R	Nissan RB26DETT 2.6 L Twin Turbo I6	10	(Japan) Akira Iida	B	All
Team Zexel; Johnson NISMO	Nissan	Nissan Skyline GT-R	Nissan RB26DETT 2.6 L Twin Turbo I6	10	(Japan) Eiji Yamada	B	1-2
Hasemi Motorsport	Nissan	Nissan Skyline GT-R	Nissan RB26DETT 2.6 L Twin Turbo I6	3	(Japan) Masahiro Hasemi	B	All
BLITZ Racing Team	Toyota	Toyota Supra	Toyota 2JZ-GTE 3.0 L Twin Turbo I6 (Rd. 1-2); Toyota 3S-GT 2.0 L Turbo I4 (Rd. 5)	5	(Japan) Hideo Fukuyama	D	1-2
BLITZ Racing Team	Toyota	Toyota Supra	Toyota 2JZ-GTE 3.0 L Twin Turbo I6 (Rd. 1-2); Toyota 3S-GT 2.0 L Turbo I4 (Rd. 5)	5	(Denmark) Tom Kristensen	D	5
acom Racing Team NOVA	Porsche	Porsche 964 RSR	Porsche M64/04 3.8 L F6	9	(Italy) Mauro Martini	B	All
Hunter Racing	Porsche	Porsche 964 Turbo	Porsche M64/50 3.6 L Turbo F6	11	(Japan) Hiroyuki Yoshimoto	B	3-4
Hunter Racing	Porsche	Porsche 964 Turbo	Porsche M64/50 3.6 L Turbo F6	11	(Japan) Hiroaki Sano	B	3-4
Mooncraft	Nissan	Nissan Silvia	Nissan SR20DET 2.0 L Turbo I4	14	(Japan) Naoki Hattori	B	All
Mooncraft	Nissan	Nissan Silvia	Nissan SR20DET 2.0 L Turbo I4	14	(Japan) Takashi Ohi	B	1, 4-5
Racing Team Nakaharu	Nissan	Nissan Skyline GT-R	Nissan RB26DETT 2.6 L Twin Turbo I6	24	(Japan) Seiichi Sodeyama	B	All
Racing Team Nakaharu	Nissan	Nissan Skyline GT-R	Nissan RB26DETT 2.6 L Twin Turbo I6	24	(Japan) Shinichi Yamaji	B	All
Team LeMans	Nissan	Nissan Fairlady Z	Nissan VQ30DE 3.0 L V6	25	(Japan) Masami Kageyama	B	1-2
Team LeMans	Nissan	Nissan Fairlady Z	Nissan VQ30DE 3.0 L V6	25	(Japan) Akira Ishikawa	B	2
Team LeMans	Nissan	Nissan Fairlady Z LM	Nissan VH45DE 4.5 L V8	25	(Japan) Akira Ishikawa	B	3-4
Team LeMans	Nissan	Nissan Fairlady Z LM	Nissan VH45DE 4.5 L V8	25	(United Kingdom) Richard Dean	B	3
Team LeMans	Nissan	Nissan Fairlady Z LM	Nissan VH45DE 4.5 L V8	25	(Japan) Masami Kageyama	B	4-5
ROSS Competition	Lancia	Lancia 037	Lancia 232AR4 2.0 L supercharged I4	27	(Japan) Naohiro Furuya	G	3
Max Try Racing	Nissan	Nissan Skyline GT-R	Nissan RB26DETT 2.6 L Twin Turbo I6	32	(Japan) Shigeru Oyama	Y	3
Max Try Racing	Nissan	Nissan Skyline GT-R	Nissan RB26DETT 2.6 L Twin Turbo I6	32	(Japan) Nobuyuki Maehara	Y	3
Team Taisan	Ferrari	Ferrari F40 LM	Ferrari F120B 2.9 L Twin Turbo V8	34	(Japan) Keiichi Suzuki	Y	5
Team Taisan	Ferrari	Ferrari F40 LM	Ferrari F120B 2.9 L Twin Turbo V8	34	(Japan) Hideshi Matsuda	Y	5
Team Taisan	Ferrari	Ferrari F40 LM	Ferrari F120B 2.9 L Twin Turbo V8	40	(Japan) Tetsuya Ota	Y	All
Team Taisan	Ferrari	Ferrari F40 LM	Ferrari F120B 2.9 L Twin Turbo V8	40	(Japan) Keiichi Suzuki	Y	1, 3
Team Taisan	Ferrari	Ferrari F40 LM	Ferrari F120B 2.9 L Twin Turbo V8	40	(United Kingdom) Anthony Reid	Y	2, 4
Team Taisan	Ferrari	Ferrari F40 LM	Ferrari F120B 2.9 L Twin Turbo V8	40	(Argentina) Oscar Larrauri	Y	5
Team Taisan	Porsche	Porsche 962C	Porsche 962/83 3.2 L Twin Turbo F6	35	(United Kingdom) Anthony Reid	Y	3, 5
Team Taisan	Porsche	Porsche 962C	Porsche 962/83 3.2 L Twin Turbo F6	35	(Japan) Masahiko Kondo	Y	3, 5
Team Taisan	Porsche	Porsche 962C	Porsche 962/83 3.2 L Twin Turbo F6	50	(United Kingdom) Anthony Reid	Y	1
Team Taisan	Porsche	Porsche 962C	Porsche 962/83 3.2 L Twin Turbo F6	50	(Japan) Kazuo Mogi	Y	1
Shift Point	Toyota	Toyota Supra	Toyota 3S-GT 2.0 L Turbo I4	37	(Japan) Hidehiro Mochizuki	T	1
Shift Point	Toyota	Toyota Supra	Toyota 3S-GT 2.0 L Turbo I4	37	(Japan) Akira Ishikawa	T	1
Toyota Team SARD	Toyota	Toyota Supra	Toyota 3S-GT 2.0 L Turbo I4	39	(United States) Jeff Krosnoff	M	4-5
Belldeer Cooperation	Nissan	Nissan Skyline GT-R	Nissan RB26DETT 2.6 L Twin Turbo I6	77	(Japan) Katsuhiko Okamoto	B	1
Belldeer Cooperation	Nissan	Nissan Skyline GT-R	Nissan RB26DETT 2.6 L Twin Turbo I6	77	(Japan) Shinjiro Fukami	B	1
KEN WOLF with Terai Engineering	Lamborghini	Lamborghini Countach 25th Anniversary	Lamborghini L507 V4 5.2 L V12	88	(Japan) Satoshi Izekawa	Y	All
KEN WOLF with Terai Engineering	Lamborghini	Lamborghini Countach 25th Anniversary	Lamborghini L507 V4 5.2 L V12	88	(Japan) Takao Wada	Y	All
Team Kunimitsu	Porsche	Porsche 993 RSR Turbo	Porsche M64/60 3.8 L Turbo F6	100	(Japan) Kunimitsu Takahashi	Y	3-5
Team Kunimitsu	Porsche	Porsche 993 RSR Turbo	Porsche M64/60 3.8 L Turbo F6	100	(Japan) Keiichi Tsuchiya	Y	3-5

=== GT2 ===
Team	Make	Car	Engine	No.	Drivers	Tyre	Rounds
Hunter Racing	Porsche	Porsche 964 Turbo	Porsche M64/50 3.6 L Turbo F6	11	(Japan) Hiroyuki Yoshimoto	B	1
Hunter Racing	Porsche	Porsche 964 Turbo	Porsche M64/50 3.6 L Turbo F6	11	(Japan) Masahiro Hayashi	B	1
KK Scuderia	Mazda	Mazda RX-7 (FC3S)	Mazda RE13B 1.3 L 2-rotor	12	(Japan) Tetsuya Kawasaki	D	2, 4
KK Scuderia	Mazda	Mazda RX-7 (FC3S)	Mazda RE13B 1.3 L 2-rotor	12	(Japan) Toshio Fukushima	D	3-4
Dandelion Racing	Nissan	Nissan Skyline GTS-R (R32)	Nissan RB20DET 2.0 L Turbo I6	22	(Japan) Katsuo Mizunuma	Y	3-5
Dandelion Racing	Nissan	Nissan Skyline GTS-R (R32)	Nissan RB20DET 2.0 L Turbo I6	22	(Japan) Tsuyoshi Sunaga	Y	3-4
Dandelion Racing	Nissan	Nissan Skyline GTS-R (R32)	Nissan RB20DET 2.0 L Turbo I6	22	(Japan) Mitsuo Akimoto	Y	5
NAC WEST	Nissan	Nissan Skyline RS (R30)	Nissan FJ20DET 2.0 L Turbo I4	26	(Japan) Masanori Sugiyama	Y	3
NAC WEST	Nissan	Nissan Skyline RS (R30)	Nissan FJ20DET 2.0 L Turbo I4	26	(Japan) Takuya Kurosawa	Y	3
Korg Kegani Racing	Porsche	Porsche 964 Carrera RS	Porsche M64/80 3.8 L F6	29	(Japan) Sakae Obata	B	All
Korg Kegani Racing	Porsche	Porsche 964 Carrera RS	Porsche M64/80 3.8 L F6	29	(Japan) Hideo Uehara	B	All
Amuze Racing	Mazda	Mazda RX-7 (FC3S)	Mazda RE13B 1.3 L 2-rotor	33	(Japan) Atsushi Hayakawa	D	1, 3
Amuze Racing	Mazda	Mazda RX-7 (FC3S)	Mazda RE13B 1.3 L 2-rotor	33	(Japan) Tetsuji Shiratori	D	1, 3
Osuka Racing	Porsche	Porsche 964 Turbo	Porsche M64/50 3.6 L Turbo F6	52	(Japan) Morio Nitta	B	4
Osuka Racing	Porsche	Porsche 964 Turbo	Porsche M64/50 3.6 L Turbo F6	52	(Japan) Tsugutoshi Goto	B	4
Tomei Sports	Porsche	Porsche 964	Porsche M64/80 3.8 L F6	55	(Japan) Kohichi Kashiwabara	B	3-5
Tomei Sports	Porsche	Porsche 964	Porsche M64/80 3.8 L F6	55	(Japan) Masahiro Hayashi	B	3-4
Yoshimi Ishibashi	Nissan	Nissan Skyline GTS-R (HR31)	Nissan SR20DET 2.0 L Turbo I4	70	(Japan) Yoshimi Ishibashi	Y	All
Yoshimi Ishibashi	Nissan	Nissan Skyline GTS-R (HR31)	Nissan SR20DET 2.0 L Turbo I4	70	(Japan) Hiroyasu Aoyagi	Y	1
Yoshimi Ishibashi	Nissan	Nissan Skyline GTS-R (HR31)	Nissan SR20DET 2.0 L Turbo I4	70	(Japan) Fuminori Mizuno	Y	2-5
Makiguchi Engineering	BMW	BMW M3 (E30)	BMW S14 2.5 L I4	72	(Japan) Norio Makiguchi	Y	4-5
Makiguchi Engineering	BMW	BMW M3 (E30)	BMW S14 2.5 L I4	72	(Japan) Hideshi Matsuda	Y	4
Makiguchi Engineering	BMW	BMW M3 (E30)	BMW S14 2.5 L I4	72	(Japan) Yukio Okamoto	Y	5

== Season results ==
Round	Circuit	GT1 Winning Team	GT2 Winning Team
Round	Circuit	GT1 Winning Drivers	GT2 Winning Drivers
1	Mt. Fuji	#1 Calsonic Hoshino Racing GT-R	#29 Korg Kegani Racing Porsche 964
1	Mt. Fuji	(Japan) Masahiko Kageyama	(Japan) Sakae Obata (Japan) Hideo Uehara
2	Sendai	#3 Hasemi Motorsports GT-R	#29 Korg Kegani Racing Porsche 964
2	Sendai	(Japan) Masahiro Hasemi	(Japan) Sakae Obata (Japan) Hideo Uehara
3	Mt. Fuji	#35 Team Taisan Porsche 962C	#70 Yoshimi Ishibashi Nissan Skyline
3	Mt. Fuji	(United Kingdom) Anthony Reid (Japan) Masahiko Kondo	(Japan) Yoshimi Ishibashi (Japan) Fumimori Mizuno
4	Sportsland SUGO	#100 Team Kunimitsu Porsche 993	#12 KK Scuderia Mazda RX-7
4	Sportsland SUGO	(Japan) Keiichi Tsuchiya (Japan) Kunimitsu Takahashi	(Japan) Toshihiro Fukushima (Japan) Tetsuya Kawasaki
5	Mine Circuit	#40 Team Taisan Ferrari F40	#72 Makiguchi Engineering BMW M3
5	Mine Circuit	(Japan) Tetsuya Ota (Argentina) Oscar Larrauri	(Japan) Norio Makiguchi (Japan) Yukio Okamoto

== Point Ranking ==
=== GT1 Drivers' standings ===
Scoring system

Position	1st	2nd	3rd	4th	5th	6th	7th	8th	9th	10th
Points	20	15	12	10	8	6	4	3	2	1

Rank	Driver	FUJ (Japan)	SEN (Japan)	FUJ (Japan)	SUG (Japan)	MIN (Japan)	PTS
1	(Japan) Masahiko Kageyama	1	2	2	4	4	70
2	(Japan) Masahiro Hasemi	6	1	4	3	5	56
3	(Japan) Seiichi Sodeyama (Japan) Shinichi Yamaji	2	4	5	5	6	47
5	(United Kingdom) Anthony Reid	NC	3	1	Ret	3	44
6	(Japan) Tetsuya Ota	3	3	3	Ret	1	39
7	(Japan) Keiichi Tsuchiya (Japan) Kunimitsu Takahashi			Ret	1	2	35
9	(Japan) Masahiko Kondo			1		3	32
10	(Japan) Toshio Suzuki	Ret	6	6	2	Ret	27
11	(Japan) Keiichi Suzuki	3	3			4	27
12	(Argentina) Oscar Larrauri					1	20
13	(Japan) Akira Iida	Ret	5	8	6	9	19
14	(Japan) Naoki Hattori	4	10	Ret	8	Ret	14
14	(Japan) Takashi Ohi	4	10		8	Ret	14
16	(Italy) Mauro Martini	5	Ret	7	10	Ret	13
17	(Japan) Masami Kageyama	Ret	9		7	7	10
18	(Japan) Eiji Yamada	Ret	5				8
19	(Japan) Akira Ishikawa	Ret	9	11	7		6
20	(Japan) Hideo Fukuyama	Ret	7				4
21	(Japan) Satoshi Ikezawa (Japan) Takao Wada	NC	8	Ret	11	Ret	3
21	(Japan) Hideshi Matsuda					8	3
24	(Japan) Naohiro Furuya			9			2
24	(Japan) Hiroyuki Yoshimoto (Japan) Hiroaki Sano			Ret	9		2
27	(Japan) Shigeru Ohyama (Japan) Nobufumi Maehara			10			1
27	(United States) Jeff Krosnoff				Ret	10	1
NC	(United Kingdom) Richard Dean			11			0
NC	(Denmark) Tom Kristensen					11	0
NC	(Japan) Kazuo Mogi	NC					0
NC	(Japan) Hidehiro Mochizuki	Ret					0
NC	(Japan) Katsuhiko Okamoto (Japan) Shinjiro Fukami	DNS					0
Rank	Driver	FUJ (Japan)	SEN (Japan)	FUJ (Japan)	SUG (Japan)	MIN (Japan)	PTS

Colour	Result
Gold	Winner
Silver	Second place
Bronze	Third place
Green	Points classification
Blue	Non-points classification
Blue	Non-classified finish (NC)
Purple	Retired, not classified (Ret)
Red	Did not qualify (DNQ)
Red	Did not pre-qualify (DNPQ)
Black	Disqualified (DSQ)
White	Did not start (DNS)
White	Withdrew (WD)
White	Race cancelled (C)
Blank	Did not practice (DNP)
Blank	Did not arrive (DNA)
Blank	Excluded (EX)

=== GT1 Teams' standings ===
For teams that entered multiple cars, only the best result from each round counted towards the teams' championship.

Rank	Team	No.	FUJ (Japan)	SEN (Japan)	FUJ (Japan)	SUG (Japan)	MIN (Japan)	PTS
1	Calsonic Hoshino Racing	1	1	2	2	4	4	70
2	Team Taisan	34					8	64
2	Team Taisan	40	3	3	3	Ret	1	64
2	Team Taisan	50/35	NC		1		3	64
3	Hasemi Motorsports	3	6	1	4	3	5	56
4	Racing Team Nakaharu	24	2	4	5	5	6	47
5	Team Kunimitsu	100			Ret	1	2	35
5	Team Zexel	2	Ret	6	6	2	Ret	27
6	Johnson NISMO	10	Ret	5	8	6	9	19
7	Mooncraft	14	4	10	Ret	8	Ret	14
8	acom Racing Team NOVA	9	5	Ret	7	10	Ret	13
9	Team LeMans	25	Ret	9	11	7	7	10
10	BLITZ Racing Team	5	Ret	7			11	4
11	KEN WOLF with Terai Engineering	88	NC	8	Ret	11	Ret	3
12	ROSS Competition	27			9			2
13	Hunter Racing	11			Ret	9		2
14	Max Try Racing	32			10			1
-	Toyota Team SARD	39				Ret	10	0
-	Shift Point	37	Ret					0
-	Belldeer Cooperation	77	DNS					0
Rank	Team	No.	FUJ (Japan)	SEN (Japan)	FUJ (Japan)	SUG (Japan)	MIN (Japan)	PTS

=== GT2 Drivers' standings ===
Scoring system

Position	1st	2nd	3rd	4th	5th	6th	7th	8th	9th	10th
Points	20	15	12	10	8	6	4	3	2	1

Rank	Driver	FUJ (Japan)	SEN (Japan)	FUJ (Japan)	SUG (Japan)	MIN (Japan)	PTS
1	(Japan) Sakae Obata	1	1	2	5	2	80
2	(Japan) Yoshimo Ishibashi	2	3	1	3	4	69
3	(Japan) Hideo Uehara	1	1	2	5	2	65
4	(Japan) Mizuno Fuminori		3	1	3	4	54
5	(Japan) Tetsuya Kawasaki		2		1		35
5	(Japan) Norio Makiguchi				2	1	35
7	(Japan) Koichi Kashiwabara			3	7	3	30
7	(Japan) Masahiro Hayashi	3		3	7		30
9	(Japan) Toshihiro Fukushima			5	1		28
10	(Japan) Yukihiro Yoshimoto	3			?		27
11	(Japan) Yukio Okamoto					1	20
12	(Japan) Hiroaki Aoyagi	2					15
12	(Japan) Hideshi Matsuda				2		15
14	(Japan) Tetsuji Shiratori (Japan) Atsushi Hayakawa	4		Ret	9		13
16	(Japan) Masanori Sugiyama (Japan) Takuya Kurosawa			4			10
18	(Japan) Morio Nitta (Japan) Goto Tsugutoshi				6		8
20	(Japan) Katsuo Mizunuma			Ret	8	Ret	4
20	(Japan) Tsuyoshi Sunaga			Ret	8		4
Rank	Driver	FUJ (Japan)	SEN (Japan)	FUJ (Japan)	SUG (Japan)	MIN (Japan)	PTS

Colour	Result
Gold	Winner
Silver	Second place
Bronze	Third place
Green	Points classification
Blue	Non-points classification
Blue	Non-classified finish (NC)
Purple	Retired, not classified (Ret)
Red	Did not qualify (DNQ)
Red	Did not pre-qualify (DNPQ)
Black	Disqualified (DSQ)
White	Did not start (DNS)
White	Withdrew (WD)
White	Race cancelled (C)
Blank	Did not practice (DNP)
Blank	Did not arrive (DNA)
Blank	Excluded (EX)

=== GT2 Teams' standings ===
For teams that entered multiple cars, only the best result from each round counted towards the teams' championship.

Rank	Team	No.	FUJ (Japan)	SEN (Japan)	FUJ (Japan)	SUG (Japan)	MIN (Japan)	PTS
1	Korg Kegani Racing	29	1	1	2	5	2	80
2	Yoshimi Ishibashi	70	2	3	1	3	4	69
3	KK Scuderia	12		2	5	1		43
4	Makiguchi Engineering	72				2	1	35
5	Tomei Sports	55			3	7	3	30
6	Amuze Racing	33	4		Ret	9		13
7	Hunter Racing	11	3					12
8	NAC WEST	26			4			10
9	Osuka Racing	52				6		8
10	Dandelion Racing	22			Ret	8	Ret	4
Rank	Team	No.	FUJ (Japan)	SEN (Japan)	FUJ (Japan)	SUG (Japan)	MIN (Japan)	PTS

== Notes ==
1.Tetsuya Ota did not drive during the final and was ineligible for championship points.

== See also ==
- Super GT
- Japanese Touring Car Championship
