= 1996 All Japan Grand Touring Car Championship =

Motorsport season

The 1996 All Japan Grand Touring Car Championship was the fourth season of Japan Automobile Federation GT premiere racing. It was marked as well as the fourteenth season of a JAF-sanctioned sports car racing championship dating back to the All Japan Sports Prototype Championship. The GT500 class champion was the #61 Team Lark McLaren F1 GTR driven by David Brabham and John Nielsen, and the GT300 class champion was the #26 Team Taisan Jr Porsche 964 driven by Keiichi Suzuki and Morio Nitta.

For the 1996 season, the names of the two classes of the JGTC were changed to GT500 and GT300, replacing the previous GT1 and GT2 names from the 1994 and 1995 season. This season also mandated two-driver teams for all races. On November 17, the series held its first non-championship "All-Star Race" at Central Circuit.

The arrival of the McLaren F1 GTRs, prepared by Team Goh, was the biggest story of the 1996 season. The number 60 McLaren of Naoki Hattori and Ralf Schumacher led a 1-2 finish at the season opening round at Suzuka. However, despite winning three races, Hattori and Schumacher also suffered three retirements, and were beaten to the title by their senior teammates, Brabham and Nielsen. Despite massive performance handicaps instituted by the GTA, the two McLaren F1 GTRs combined to win four of the six championship races, and won pole position and set fastest lap in all six. At odds with the GTA over further performance handicaps that were to be proposed, Team Goh withdrew from the series after the championship finale at Miné Circuit, and after an aborted attempt to return in 2006, they would not return to the series until 2019.

The season also featured the debut of the Honda NSX in the series, although direct factory support would not appear until the following season; as such, the car entered by Team Kunimitsu was mostly mechanically identical to the 1995 24 Hours of Le Mans GT2 class winner.

== Drivers and teams ==
=== GT500 ===
Team	Make	Car	Engine	No.	Drivers	Tyre	Rounds
Calsonic Team Impul	Nissan	Nissan Skyline GT-R	Nissan RB26DETT 2.6 L Twin Turbo I6	1	(Japan) Kazuyoshi Hoshino	B	All
Calsonic Team Impul	Nissan	Nissan Skyline GT-R	Nissan RB26DETT 2.6 L Twin Turbo I6	1	(Japan) Masahiko Kageyama	B	All
Team Zexel	Nissan	Nissan Skyline GT-R	Nissan RB26DETT 2.6 L Twin Turbo I6	2	(Japan) Aguri Suzuki	B	All
Team Zexel	Nissan	Nissan Skyline GT-R	Nissan RB26DETT 2.6 L Twin Turbo I6	2	(Japan) Hideo Fukuyama	B	All
Hasemi Motorsport	Nissan	Nissan Skyline GT-R	Nissan RB26DETT 2.6 L Twin Turbo I6	3	(Japan) Masahiro Hasemi	B	All
Hasemi Motorsport	Nissan	Nissan Skyline GT-R	Nissan RB26DETT 2.6 L Twin Turbo I6	3	(Japan) Tetsuya Tanaka	B	All
Taku Motor Sports	Porsche	Porsche 993 GT2	Porsche M64/81 3.6 L Turbo F6	5	(Japan) Kaoru Iida	B	All
Taku Motor Sports	Porsche	Porsche 993 GT2	Porsche M64/81 3.6 L Turbo F6	5	(Japan) Tetsuya Ota	B	1–3, 5–6
Taku Motor Sports	Porsche	Porsche 993 GT2	Porsche M64/81 3.6 L Turbo F6	5	(Germany) Michael Krumm	B	4
FET Racing Team	Toyota	Toyota Supra	Toyota 3S-GT 2.0 L Turbo I4	8	(Denmark) Tom Kristensen	B	All
FET Racing Team	Toyota	Toyota Supra	Toyota 3S-GT 2.0 L Turbo I4	8	(Japan) Tatsuya Tanigawa	B	1–3
FET Racing Team	Toyota	Toyota Supra	Toyota 3S-GT 2.0 L Turbo I4	8	(France) Bertrand Gachot	B	4–6
Prova Motorsport	Porsche	Porsche 964 Turbo	Porsche M64/60 3.6 L Turbo F6	15	(Japan) Motoji Sekine	D	All
Prova Motorsport	Porsche	Porsche 964 Turbo	Porsche M64/60 3.6 L Turbo F6	15	(Canada) Scott Maxwell	D	1
Prova Motorsport	Porsche	Porsche 964 Turbo	Porsche M64/60 3.6 L Turbo F6	15	(Japan) Taro Mitsuno	D	2
Prova Motorsport	Porsche	Porsche 964 Turbo	Porsche M64/60 3.6 L Turbo F6	15	(Japan) Takahiro Ito	D	3–6
Prova Motorsport	Porsche	Porsche 993 GT2	Porsche M64/81 3.6 L Turbo F6	16	(Japan) Satoshi Toda	D	4–5
Prova Motorsport	Porsche	Porsche 993 GT2	Porsche M64/81 3.6 L Turbo F6	16	(Japan) Taro Mitsuno	D	4
Prova Motorsport	Porsche	Porsche 993 GT2	Porsche M64/81 3.6 L Turbo F6	16	(Japan) Eiji Yamada	D	5
Prova Motorsport	Porsche	Porsche 993 GT2	Porsche M64/81 3.6 L Turbo F6	16	(Japan) Osamu Nakajima	D	6
Prova Motorsport	Porsche	Porsche 993 GT2	Porsche M64/81 3.6 L Turbo F6	16	(Japan) Ichiro Iijima	D	6
Team-Jun	Nissan	Nissan Skyline GT-R	Nissan SR20DET 2.0 L Turbo I4	19	(Japan) Katsuo Kobayashi	Y	All
Team-Jun	Nissan	Nissan Skyline GT-R	Nissan SR20DET 2.0 L Turbo I4	19	(Japan) Naohiro Furuya	Y	1–3
Team-Jun	Nissan	Nissan Skyline GT-R	Nissan SR20DET 2.0 L Turbo I4	19	(Japan) Manabu Orido	Y	4
Team-Jun	Nissan	Nissan Skyline GT-R	Nissan SR20DET 2.0 L Turbo I4	19	(Japan) Koma Mitsutake	Y	5–6
Bros Factory	Nissan	Nissan Fairlady Z LM	Nissan VH45DE 4.5 L V8	25	(Japan) Masami Kageyama	Y	2–3, 5–6, NC
Bros Factory	Nissan	Nissan Fairlady Z LM	Nissan VH45DE 4.5 L V8	25	(Japan) Yuji Tachikawa	Y	2–3, 5–6, NC
Team Take One	Porsche	Porsche 993 GT2	Porsche M64/81 3.6 L Turbo F6	30	(Japan) Yoji Yamada	B	All
Team Take One	Porsche	Porsche 993 GT2	Porsche M64/81 3.6 L Turbo F6	30	(Japan) Eiichi Tajima	B	1–6
Team Take One	Porsche	Porsche 993 GT2	Porsche M64/81 3.6 L Turbo F6	30	(Japan) Kazuo Mogi	B	NC
Team Taisan Advan	Porsche	Porsche 993 GT2	Porsche M64/81 3.6 L Turbo F6	34	(Japan) Hideshi Matsuda	B	3–4
Team Taisan Advan	Porsche	Porsche 993 GT2	Porsche M64/81 3.6 L Turbo F6	34	(Japan) Osamu Nakako	B	3–4
Team Taisan Advan	Porsche	Porsche 993 GT2	Porsche M64/81 3.6 L Turbo F6	35	(Japan) Takeshi Tsuchiya	B	1–4
Team Taisan Advan	Porsche	Porsche 993 GT2	Porsche M64/81 3.6 L Turbo F6	35	(United Kingdom) Anthony Reid	B	1
Team Taisan Advan	Porsche	Porsche 993 GT2	Porsche M64/81 3.6 L Turbo F6	35	(Argentina) Oscar Larrauri	B	2–4
Team Taisan Advan	Ferrari	Ferrari F40 LM	Ferrari F120B 2.9 L Twin Turbo V8	35	(Argentina) Oscar Larrauri	B	5–6
Team Taisan Advan	Ferrari	Ferrari F40 LM	Ferrari F120B 2.9 L Twin Turbo V8	35	(United Kingdom) Anthony Reid	B	5
Team Taisan Advan	Ferrari	Ferrari F40 LM	Ferrari F120B 2.9 L Twin Turbo V8	35	(Japan) Mitsuhiro Kinoshita	B	6
Toyota Castrol Team TOM'S	Toyota	Toyota Supra	Toyota 3S-GT 2.0 L Turbo I4	36	(Japan) Masanori Sekiya	B	All
Toyota Castrol Team TOM'S	Toyota	Toyota Supra	Toyota 3S-GT 2.0 L Turbo I4	36	(Spain) Pedro de la Rosa	B	1–6
Toyota Castrol Team TOM'S	Toyota	Toyota Supra	Toyota 3S-GT 2.0 L Turbo I4	36	(Japan) Ukyo Katayama	B	NC
Toyota Castrol Team Cerumo	Toyota	Toyota Supra	Toyota 3S-GT 2.0 L Turbo I4	37	(France) Érik Comas	B	All
Toyota Castrol Team Cerumo	Toyota	Toyota Supra	Toyota 3S-GT 2.0 L Turbo I4	37	(Japan) Hidetoshi Mitsusada	B	1–2
Toyota Castrol Team Cerumo	Toyota	Toyota Supra	Toyota 3S-GT 2.0 L Turbo I4	37	(Japan) Hironori Takeuchi	B	3–6, NC
Toyota Team SARD	Toyota	Toyota Supra	Toyota 3S-GT 2.0 L Turbo I4	39	(Australia) Wayne Gardner	D	1–4, 6
Toyota Team SARD	Toyota	Toyota Supra	Toyota 3S-GT 2.0 L Turbo I4	39	(France) Alain Ferté	D	1–5
Toyota Team SARD	Toyota	Toyota Supra	Toyota 3S-GT 2.0 L Turbo I4	39	(Japan) Naoki Nagasaka	D	5
Toyota Team SARD	Toyota	Toyota Supra	Toyota 3S-GT 2.0 L Turbo I4	39	(Italy) Giampiero Simoni	D	6
Toyota Team SARD	Toyota	Toyota Supra	Toyota 3S-GT 2.0 L Turbo I4	39	(France) Olivier Grouillard	D	NC
Toyota Team SARD	Toyota	Toyota Supra	Toyota 3S-GT 2.0 L Turbo I4	39	(France) David Dussau	D	NC
Team BMB Minijuke	Porsche	Porsche 964 RS	Porsche M64/04 3.8 L F6	43	(Japan) Yukio Okamoto	Y	All
Team BMB Minijuke	Porsche	Porsche 964 RS	Porsche M64/04 3.8 L F6	43	(Japan) Yasutaka Hinoi	Y	All
Limit Motor Sport	Nissan	Nissan Skyline GT-R	Nissan RB26DETT 2.6 L Twin Turbo I6	55	(Japan) Kenji Tohira	B	1–5
Limit Motor Sport	Nissan	Nissan Skyline GT-R	Nissan RB26DETT 2.6 L Twin Turbo I6	55	(Japan) Hiroyuki Kawai	B	1–5
Team Lark McLaren GTR	McLaren	McLaren F1 GTR	BMW S70/2 6.0 L V12	60	(Japan) Naoki Hattori	B	All
Team Lark McLaren GTR	McLaren	McLaren F1 GTR	BMW S70/2 6.0 L V12	60	(Germany) Ralf Schumacher	B	All
Team Lark McLaren GTR	McLaren	McLaren F1 GTR	BMW S70/2 6.0 L V12	61	(Australia) David Brabham	B	All
Team Lark McLaren GTR	McLaren	McLaren F1 GTR	BMW S70/2 6.0 L V12	61	(Denmark) John Nielsen	B	All
Kenji Kawagoe	Porsche	Porsche 993 GT2	Porsche M64/81 3.6 L Twin Turbo F6	69	(Japan) Kenji Kawagoe	D	1–4
Kenji Kawagoe	Porsche	Porsche 993 GT2	Porsche M64/81 3.6 L Twin Turbo F6	69	(Japan) Shunji Kasuya	D	1–4
Kenwolf with JLOC Corsa	Lamborghini	Lamborghini Diablo Jota	Lamborghini L522 5.7 L V12	88	(Japan) Takao Wada	Y	1–2, 4–6
Kenwolf with JLOC Corsa	Lamborghini	Lamborghini Diablo Jota	Lamborghini L522 5.7 L V12	88	(Japan) Tatsuhiko Kaneumi	Y	1
Kenwolf with JLOC Corsa	Lamborghini	Lamborghini Diablo Jota	Lamborghini L522 5.7 L V12	88	(Japan) Satoshi Ikezawa	Y	2, 4–6
Team Kunimitsu	Honda	Honda NSX	Honda C30A 3.0 L V6	100	(Japan) Kunimitsu Takahashi	Y	All
Team Kunimitsu	Honda	Honda NSX	Honda C30A 3.0 L V6	100	(Japan) Keiichi Tsuchiya	Y	All
Kure Racing with Nismo	Nissan	Nissan Skyline GT-R	Nissan RB26DETT 2.6 L Twin Turbo I6	556	(Japan) Toshio Suzuki	B	All
Kure Racing with Nismo	Nissan	Nissan Skyline GT-R	Nissan RB26DETT 2.6 L Twin Turbo I6	556	(Japan) Masahiko Kondo	B	All

=== GT300 ===
Team	Make	Car	Engine	No.	Drivers	Tyre	Rounds
imuraya Racing Team	Toyota	Toyota MR2	Toyota 3S-GE 2.0 L I4	6	(Japan) Tetsuya Kawasaki	D	1–5
imuraya Racing Team	Toyota	Toyota MR2	Toyota 3S-GE 2.0 L I4	6	(Japan) Kazuteru Wakita	D	1–2, 4–5
imuraya Racing Team	Toyota	Toyota MR2	Toyota 3S-GE 2.0 L I4	6	(Japan) Nendai Fukushima	D	3
imuraya Racing Team	Toyota	Toyota MR2	Toyota 3S-GE 2.0 L I4	6	(Japan) Takeshi Tsuchiya	D	6
imuraya Racing Team	Toyota	Toyota MR2	Toyota 3S-GE 2.0 L I4	6	(Japan) Yoshihiro Daimonji	D	6
RE Amemiya Racing	Mazda	Mazda RX-7 (FD3S)	Mazda RE13B 1.3 L 2-rotor	7	(Japan) Shinichi Yamaji	D	All
RE Amemiya Racing	Mazda	Mazda RX-7 (FD3S)	Mazda RE13B 1.3 L 2-rotor	7	(Japan) Masato Yamamoto	D	1
RE Amemiya Racing	Mazda	Mazda RX-7 (FD3S)	Mazda RE13B 1.3 L 2-rotor	7	(Japan) Hisashi Wada	D	2–3
RE Amemiya Racing	Mazda	Mazda RX-7 (FD3S)	Mazda RE13B 1.3 L 2-rotor	7	(Japan) Haruhiko Matsumoto	D	4–6, NC
Schloss Motorsport	Porsche	Porsche 993 RS	Porsche M64/80 3.8 L F6	9	(Japan) Katsuhiko Okamoto	D	1
Schloss Motorsport	Porsche	Porsche 993 RS	Porsche M64/80 3.8 L F6	9	(Japan) Tsunefumi Hioki	D	1
M Factory Racing	Nissan	Nissan Skyline GTS-R (HR31)	Nissan SR20DET 2.0 L Turbo I4	11	(Japan) Hiromoto Ishimori	B	2–4
M Factory Racing	Nissan	Nissan Skyline GTS-R (HR31)	Nissan SR20DET 2.0 L Turbo I4	11	(Japan) Masuo Saito	B	2–4
Hoshino Racing	Nissan	Nissan Silvia (S14)	Nissan SR20DET 2.0 L Turbo I4	12	(Japan) Satoshi Motoyama	B	3–6
Hoshino Racing	Nissan	Nissan Silvia (S14)	Nissan SR20DET 2.0 L Turbo I4	12	(Japan) Yuji Ide	B	3
Hoshino Racing	Nissan	Nissan Silvia (S14)	Nissan SR20DET 2.0 L Turbo I4	12	(Japan) Fuminori Mizuno	B	4–6
Eimei Auto	Mitsubishi	Mitsubishi Mirage C53A	Mitsubishi 4G63 2.0 L I4	14	(Japan) Akira Nagai	B	2
Eimei Auto	Mitsubishi	Mitsubishi Mirage C53A	Mitsubishi 4G63 2.0 L I4	14	(Japan) Takashige Kogayu	B	2
Team Power Magic	BMW	BMW 318i Coupe	BMW M43B18 1.8L I4	16	(Japan) Motoji Sekine	Y	5
Team Power Magic	BMW	BMW 318i Coupe	BMW M43B18 1.8L I4	16	(Japan) Toshiya Fujishima	Y	5
Kageisen Racing Team	Mazda	Mazda RX-7 (FC3S)	Mazda RE13B 1.3 L 2-rotor	17	(Japan) Toshihiko Nogami	D	1–2, 4–5
Kageisen Racing Team	Mazda	Mazda RX-7 (FC3S)	Mazda RE13B 1.3 L 2-rotor	17	(Japan) Toshiaki Koshimizu	D	1–2, 4–5
Goldenbear Sportswear R.T.	Porsche	Porsche 993 RS	Porsche M64/80 3.8 L F6	18	(Japan) Shogo Kobayashi	D	3–4
Goldenbear Sportswear R.T.	Porsche	Porsche 993 RS	Porsche M64/80 3.8 L F6	18	(Japan) Hiroyuki Enomoto	D	3–4
AI Auto Racing	Porsche	Porsche 993 RS	Porsche M64/70 3.8 L F6	20	(Japan) Kenji Takahashi	Y	All
AI Auto Racing	Porsche	Porsche 993 RS	Porsche M64/70 3.8 L F6	20	(Japan) Hiroaki Suga	Y	All
Hitotsuyama Racing	BMW	BMW M3 (E36)	BMW S14 2.2 L Turbo I4	21	(Japan) Kenji Yamamoto	D	1, 3–6
Hitotsuyama Racing	BMW	BMW M3 (E36)	BMW S14 2.2 L Turbo I4	21	(Japan) Fuminori Mizuno	D	1–2
Hitotsuyama Racing	BMW	BMW M3 (E36)	BMW S14 2.2 L Turbo I4	21	(Japan) Yasushi Hitotsuyama	D	2, 4–5
Hitotsuyama Racing	BMW	BMW M3 (E36)	BMW S14 2.2 L Turbo I4	21	(Japan) Mikio Hitotsuyama	D	3, 6
Hirano Motorsport	Nissan	Nissan Skyline GTS-i (R32)	Nissan RB20DET 2.0 L Turbo I6	24	(Japan) Toshiyuki Hirano	Y	4
Hirano Motorsport	Nissan	Nissan Skyline GTS-i (R32)	Nissan RB20DET 2.0 L Turbo I6	24	(Japan) Yasuyuki Suzuki	Y	4
Team Taisan Jr.	Porsche	Porsche 964 RSR	Porsche M64/80 3.8 L F6	26	(Japan) Keiichi Suzuki	Y	All
Team Taisan Jr.	Porsche	Porsche 964 RSR	Porsche M64/80 3.8 L F6	26	(Japan) Morio Nitta	Y	All
Team Taisan Jr.	BMW	BMW M3 (E30)	BMW S14 2.5 L I4	28	(Japan) Masaoki Nagashima	Y	1
Team Taisan Jr.	BMW	BMW M3 (E30)	BMW S14 2.5 L I4	28	(Japan) Junichi Yamanashi	Y	1
Team Taisan Jr.	Toyota	Toyota MR2	Toyota 3S-GE 2.0 L I4	28	(Japan) Manabu Orido	Y	5–6
Team Taisan Jr.	Toyota	Toyota MR2	Toyota 3S-GE 2.0 L I4	28	(Japan) Takeshi Tsuchiya	Y	5–6
Team Taisan Jr.	Porsche	Porsche 993 RSR	Porsche M64/80 3.8 L F6	38	(Hong Kong) Adrian Fu	Y	1, 3–6
Team Taisan Jr.	Porsche	Porsche 993 RSR	Porsche M64/80 3.8 L F6	38	(Australia) Rodney Jones	Y	1
Team Taisan Jr.	Porsche	Porsche 993 RSR	Porsche M64/80 3.8 L F6	38	(Japan) Masaoki Nagashima	Y	3–6
NAC West	Nissan	Nissan Silvia (S13)	Nissan FJ20DET 2.0 L Turbo I4	27	(Japan) Toshikazu Kanamori	D	4
NAC West	Nissan	Nissan Silvia (S13)	Nissan FJ20DET 2.0 L Turbo I4	27	(Japan) Mamoru Suzuki	D	4
Cobra Racing Team	Porsche	Porsche 993 RSR	Porsche M64/80 3.8 L F6	31	(Japan) Katsunori Iketani	Y	All
Cobra Racing Team	Porsche	Porsche 993 RSR	Porsche M64/80 3.8 L F6	31	(Japan) Kazuo Mogi	Y	All
Cobra Racing Team	Porsche	Porsche 993 RSR	Porsche M64/80 3.8 L F6	51	(Japan) Masamitsu Ishihara	Y	All
Cobra Racing Team	Porsche	Porsche 993 RSR	Porsche M64/80 3.8 L F6	51	(Japan) Hiroyuki Noji	Y	All
Rank Up Tomei Sports	Porsche	Porsche 993 RSR	Porsche M64/80 3.8 L F6	50	(Japan) Masahisa Nakada	Y	3–4
Rank Up Tomei Sports	Porsche	Porsche 993 RSR	Porsche M64/80 3.8 L F6	50	(Japan) Shinichi Katsura	Y	3–4
Sports Factory R.T.	Mazda	Mazda RX-7 (FD3S)	Mazda RE13B 1.3 L 2-rotor	57	(Japan) Toshihiro Fukazawa	D	4
Sports Factory R.T.	Mazda	Mazda RX-7 (FD3S)	Mazda RE13B 1.3 L 2-rotor	57	(Japan) Masaaki Nagashima	D	4
Team Gaikokuya	Porsche	Porsche 993 RSR	Porsche M64/80 3.8 L F6	70	(Japan) Yoshimi Ishibashi	Y	All
Team Gaikokuya	Porsche	Porsche 993 RSR	Porsche M64/80 3.8 L F6	70	(Japan) Kaoru Hoshino	Y	All
Makiguchi Engineering	BMW	BMW E36	BMW S14 2.5 L I4	72	(Japan) Norio Makiguchi	Y	All
Makiguchi Engineering	BMW	BMW E36	BMW S14 2.5 L I4	72	(Japan) Takayuki Kinoshita	Y	All
First Racing Team	Toyota	Toyota MR2	Toyota 3S-GE 2.0 L I4	91	(Japan) Masahiro Matsunaga	Y	3–6
First Racing Team	Toyota	Toyota MR2	Toyota 3S-GE 2.0 L I4	91	(Japan) Junko Mihara	Y	3–4
First Racing Team	Toyota	Toyota MR2	Toyota 3S-GE 2.0 L I4	91	(Japan) Takahito Kawai	Y	5–6
Team Daishin	Nissan	Nissan Silvia (S13)	Nissan FJ20DET 2.0 L Turbo I4	95	(Japan) Nobuyuki Ohyagi	B	All
Team Daishin	Nissan	Nissan Silvia (S13)	Nissan FJ20DET 2.0 L Turbo I4	95	(Japan) Tsuneaki Mankumo	B	All
910 Racing	Porsche	Porsche 993 RSR	Porsche M64/80 3.8 L F6	910	(Japan) Seiichi Sodeyama	D	2–6, NC
910 Racing	Porsche	Porsche 993 RSR	Porsche M64/80 3.8 L F6	910	(Japan) Naoki Nagasaka	D	2–4
910 Racing	Porsche	Porsche 993 RSR	Porsche M64/80 3.8 L F6	910	(Japan) Hideyuki Tamamoto	D	5–6, NC

== Schedule ==
Round	Race	Circuit	Date
1	Suzuka GT 300	(Japan) Suzuka Circuit	March 31
2	All Japan Fuji GT Race	(Japan) Fuji Speedway	May 4
3	HiLand GT Championship	(Japan) Sendai Hi-Land Raceway	June 30
4	Japan Special GT-Cup	(Japan) Fuji Speedway	August 11
5	SUGO GT Championship	(Japan) Sportsland SUGO	October 6
6	CP Mine GT Race	(Japan) Mine Circuit	October 27
NC	Nicos Cup GT Allstar Race	(Japan) Central Circuit	November 17

== Season results ==
Round	Circuit	GT500 Winning Team	GT300 Winning Team
Round	Circuit	GT500 Winning Drivers	GT300 Winning Drivers
1	Suzuka Circuit	#60 Team Lark McLaren F1 GTR	#26 Team Taisan Jr Porsche 964
1	Suzuka Circuit	(Japan) Naoki Hattori (Germany) Ralf Schumacher	(Japan) Keiichi Suzuki (Japan) Morio Nitta
2	Mt. Fuji	#61 Team Lark McLaren F1 GTR	#910 910 Racing Porsche 993
2	Mt. Fuji	(Australia) David Brabham (Denmark) John Nielsen	(Japan) Seiichi Sodeyama (Japan) Naoki Nagasaka
3	Sendai	#37 Castrol Cerumo Toyota Supra	#72 Makiguchi Engineering BMW M3
3	Sendai	(Japan) Hironori Takeuchi (France) Érik Comas	(Japan) Morio Makiguchi (Japan) Takayuki Kinoshita
4	Mt. Fuji	#1 Calsonic Hoshino Racing GT-R	#910 910 Racing Porsche 993
4	Mt. Fuji	(Japan) Masahiko Kageyama (Japan) Kazuyoshi Hoshino	(Japan) Seiichi Sodeyama (Japan) Naoki Nagasaka
5	Sportsland SUGO	#60 Team Lark McLaren F1 GTR	#26 Team Taisan Jr Porsche 964
5	Sportsland SUGO	(Japan) Naoki Hattori (Germany) Ralf Schumacher	(Japan) Keiichi Suzuki (Japan) Morio Nitta
6	Mine Circuit	#60 Team Lark McLaren F1 GTR	#26 Team Taisan Jr Porsche 964
6	Mine Circuit	(Japan) Naoki Hattori (Germany) Ralf Schumacher	(Japan) Keiichi Suzuki (Japan) Morio Nitta
NC	Central Circuit	#3 Hasemi Motorsports GT-R	#7 RE Amemiya Mazda RX-7
NC	Central Circuit	(Japan) Masahiro Hasemi (Japan) Tetsuya Tanaka	(Japan) Shinichi Yamaji (Japan) Haruhiko Matsumoto

== Point Ranking ==
=== GT500 Drivers' championship ===
Rank	No.	Driver	SUZ (Japan)	FUJ (Japan)	SEN (Japan)	FUJ (Japan)	SUG (Japan)	MIN (Japan)	CEN (Japan)	Pts.
1	61	(Denmark) John Nielsen (Australia) David Brabham	2	1	8	2	Ret	4		63
2	60	(Japan) Naoki Hattori (Germany) Ralf Schumacher	1	Ret	15	Ret	1	1		60
3	37	(France) Érik Comas	16	4	1	Ret	4	2	2	55
4	1	(Japan) Masahiko Kageyama (Japan) Kazuyoshi Hoshino	8	5	5	1	2	Ret	5	54
5	3	(Japan) Masahiro Hasemi (Japan) Tetsuya Tanaka	3	6	2	14	6	5	1	47
6	2	(Japan) Aguri Suzuki (Japan) Hideo Fukuyama	4	Ret	7	3	5	3	3	46
7	37	(Japan) Hironori Takeuchi			1	Ret	4	2	2	45
8	36	(Japan) Masanori Sekiya	5	2	3	Ret	8	Ret	4	38
8	36	(Spain) Pedro de la Rosa	5	2	3	Ret	8	Ret		38
9	39	(France) Alain Ferté	17	3	4	9	7			28
10	39	(Australia) Wayne Gardner	17	3	4	9		8		27
11	556	(Japan) Toshio Suzuki (Japan) Masahiko Kondo	6	Ret	17	5	3	10	10	27
12	8	(Denmark) Tom Kristensen	10	13	6	4	14	7		21
13	8	(France) Bertrand Gachot				4	14	7		14
14	37	(Japan) Hidetoshi Mitsusada	16	4						10
15	34	(Japan) Hideshi Matsuda (Japan) Osamu Nakako	9	9	Ret	12	12	6	8	10
16	55	(Japan) Kenji Tohira (Japan) Hiroyuki Kawai	11	10	11	6	9			9
17	100	(Japan) Kunimitsu Takahashi (Japan) Keiichi Tsuchiya	Ret	8	12	7	10	11	6	8
18	8	(Japan) Tatsuya Tanigawa	10	13	6					7
19	30	(Japan) Yoji Yamada	7	11	9	Ret	Ret	Ret	9	6
19	30	(Japan) Eiichi Tajima	7	11	9	Ret	Ret	Ret		6
20	35	(Argentina) Oscar Larrauri		7	Ret		15	Ret		4
20	35	(Japan) Takeshi Tsuchiya	12	7	Ret					4
20	39	(Japan) Naoki Nagasaka					7			4
23	43	(Japan) Yasutaka Hinoi (Japan) Yukio Yamamoto	Ret	12	13	8	13	Ret		3
23	39	(Italy) Giampiero Simoni						8		3
25	25	(Japan) Masami Kageyama (Japan) Yuji Tachikawa		Ret	Ret		Ret	9		2
26	5	(Japan) Kaoru Iida	13	14	10	Ret	Ret	12		1
26	5	(Japan) Tetsuya Ota	13	14	10		Ret	12		1
26	16	(Japan) Tetsushi Toda				10	11			1
26	15	(Japan) Mitsuno Taro		16						0
26	16	(Japan) Mitsuno Taro				10				1
	88	(Japan) Takao Wada	Ret	Ret		11	Ret	13		0
	88	(Japan) Satoshi Ikezawa		Ret		11	Ret	13		0
	16	(Japan) Tarzan Yamada					11			0
	35	(United Kingdom) Anthony Reid	12				15			0
	19	(Japan) Katsuo Kobayashi	Ret	17	16	13	Ret	14		0
	19	(Japan) Manabu Orido				13				0
	69	(Japan) Kenji Kawagoe (Japan) Shunji Kasuya	14	15	14					0
	19	(Japan) Takeru Koma					Ret	14		0
	15	(Japan) Sekine Motoshi	15	16	Ret	15	Ret			0
	15	(Japan) Takahiro Ito			Ret	15	Ret			0
	15	(Canada) Scott Maxwell	15							0
	19	(Japan) Naohiro Furuya	Ret	17	16					0
	35	(Japan) Mitsuhiro Kinoshita						Ret		0
	5	(Germany) Michael Krumm				Ret				0
	16	(Japan) Osamu Nakajima (Japan) Ijima Ichiro						Ret		0
	88	(Japan) Tatsuhiko Kaneumi	Ret							0
	36	(Japan) Ukyo Katayama							4	0
	39	(France) Olivier Grouillard (France) David Dussau							7	0
	30	(Japan) Kazuo Mogi							9	0
Rank	No.	Driver	SUZ (Japan)	FUJ (Japan)	SEN (Japan)	FUJ (Japan)	SUG (Japan)	MIN (Japan)	CEN (Japan)	Pts.

==== GT500 Teams' standings ====
For teams that entered multiple cars, only the best result from each round counted towards the teams' championship.

Rank	Team	No.	SUZ (Japan)	FUJ (Japan)	SEN (Japan)	FUJ (Japan)	SUG (Japan)	MIN (Japan)	CEN (Japan)	Pts.
1	Team Lark McLaren GTR	60	1	Ret	15	Ret	1	1		98
1	Team Lark McLaren GTR	61	2	1	8	2	Ret	4		98
2	Toyota Castrol Team	36	5	2	3	Ret	8	Ret	4	68
2	Toyota Castrol Team	37	16	4	1	Ret	4	2	2	68
3	Calsonic Team Impul	1	8	5	5	1	2	Ret	5	54
4	Nismo	2	4	Ret	7	3	5	3	3	50
4	Nismo	556	6	Ret	17	5	3	10	10	50
5	Hasemi Motorsports	3	3	6	2	14	6	5	1	47
6	Toyota Team SARD	39	17	3	4	9	7	8	7	31
7	FET Racing Team	8	10	13	6	4	14	7		21
8	Team Taisan Advan	34	9	9	Ret	12	12	6	8	12
8	Team Taisan Advan	35	12	7	Ret	DNS	15	Ret		12
9	Limit Motor Sport	55	11	10	11	6	9			9
10	Team Kunimitsu	100	Ret	8	12	7	10	11	6	8
11	Team Take One	30	7	11	9	Ret	Ret	Ret	9	6
12	Team BMB Minijuke	43	Ret	12	13	8	13	Ret		3
13	Bros Factory	25		Ret	Ret		Ret	9	WD	2
14	Taku Motor Sports	5	13	14	10	Ret	Ret	12		1
14	Prova Motorsport	15	15	16	Ret	15	Ret	DNA		1
14	Prova Motorsport	16				10	11	Ret		1
-	JLOC	88	Ret	Ret		11	Ret	13		0
-	Kenji Kawagoe	69	14	15	14	DNA				0
Rank	Team	No.	SUZ (Japan)	FUJ (Japan)	SEN (Japan)	FUJ (Japan)	SUG (Japan)	MIN (Japan)	CEN (Japan)	Pts.

=== GT300 Drivers' championship ===
Rank	No.	Driver	SUZ (Japan)	FUJ (Japan)	SEN (Japan)	FUJ (Japan)	SUG (Japan)	MIN (Japan)	CEN (Japan)	Pts.
1	26	(Japan) Keiichi Suzuki (Japan) Morio Nitta	1	2	Ret	2	1	1	3	90
2	910	(Japan) Seiichi Sodeyama		1	4	1	2	Ret	2	65
3	72	(Japan) Norio Makiguchi (Japan) Takayuki Kinoshita	3	4	1	Ret	10	4		53
4	910	(Japan) Naoki Nagasaka		1	4	1				50
5	31	(Japan) Katsunori Iketani (Japan) Kazuo Mogi	2	7	Ret	Ret	3	2		46
6	7	(Japan) Shinichi Yamaji	Ret	9	3	3	5	6	1	40
7	6	(Japan) Tetsuya Kawasaki	4	3	2	9	13			39
8	70	(Japan) Yoshimi Ishibashi (Japan) Kaoru Hoshino	5	5	5	5	Ret	DNA	4	32
8	21	(Japan) Kenji Yamamoto	8		6	6	7	3		31
9	7	(Japan) Haruhiko Matsumoto				3	5	6	1	26
10	6	(Japan) Kazuteru Wakita	4	3		9				24
11	21	(Japan) Mikio Hitotsuyama			6			3		18
11	6	(Japan) Takeshi Tsuchiya					4	5		18
11	20	(Japan) Kenji Takahashi (Japan) Hiroaki Suga	6	Ret		4	11	9		18
14	6	(Japan) Toshihiro Fukushima			2		13			15
14	910	(Japan) Hideyuki Tamamoto					2	Ret	2	15
16	7	(Japan) Hisashi Wada		9	3					14
17	91	(Japan) Masahiro Matsunaga			9	8	6	11		11
18	28	(Japan) Manabu Orido					4			10
18	21	(Japan) Yasushi Hitotsuyama		Ret		6	7			10
18	51	(Japan) Masamitsu Ishihara (Japan) Hiroyuki Noji	11	6	Ret	10	8			10
21	6	(Japan) Yoshihiro Ohmonji						5		8
21	38	(Hong Kong) Adrian Fu	9		8	12		8		8
23	12	(Japan) Mizuno Fumino	8	Ret		Ret	12	7		7
24	91	(Japan) Takahito Kawai					6	11		6
24	38	(Japan) Masaoki Nagashima	12	DNA	8	12		8		6
26	95	(Japan) Nobuyuki Ohyagi (Japan) Tsuneaki Mankumo	7	Ret	Ret	15	15	10		5
26	91	(Japan) Junko Mihara			9	8				5
28	18	(Japan) Shogo Kobayashi			7	Ret				4
28	18	(Japan) Hiroyuki Enomoto			7					4
28	57	(Japan) Toshihiro Fukazawa (Japan) Masaaki Nagashima					7	12		4
28	12	(Japan) Satoshi Motoyama		DNA	Ret	Ret	12	7		4
32	11	(Japan) Hiromoto Ishimori (Japan) Masuo Saito		8	Ret	14				3
32	17	(Japan) Toshihiko Nogami	10	Ret		11	9			3
32	17	(Japan) Toshiaki Koshimizu	10			11	9			3
35	38	Rodney Jones	9							2
NC	28	(Japan) Junichi Yamanashi	12	DNA						0
NC	9	(Japan) Katsuhiko Okamoto (Japan) Tsunefumi Hioki	13							0
NC	27	(Japan) Toshikazu Kanamori (Japan) Mamoru Suzuki				13				0
NC	7	(Japan) Masato Yamamoto	Ret							0
NC	14	(Japan) Akira Nagai (Japan) Takashige Kogayu		Ret						0
NC	17	(Japan) Koshimizu Toshiaki		Ret						0
NC	12	(Japan) Yuji Ide		DNA	Ret					0
NC	18	(Japan) Kazushige Saitou				Ret				0
NC	50	(Japan) Masahisa Nakada (Japan) Shinichi Katsura		DNA		DNS				0
NC	15	(Japan) Toshiyuki Hirano (Japan) Yasuyuki Suzuki				DNS				0
NC	76	(Japan) Hirokiho Itagaki (Japan) Masami Yoshida		DNA						0
Rank	No.	Driver	SUZ (Japan)	FUJ (Japan)	SEN (Japan)	FUJ (Japan)	SUG (Japan)	MIN (Japan)	CEN (Japan)	Pts.

==== GT300 Teams' standings ====
For teams that entered multiple cars, only the best result from each round counted towards the teams' championship.

Rank	Team	No.	SUZ (Japan)	FUJ (Japan)	SEN (Japan)	FUJ (Japan)	SUG (Japan)	MIN (Japan)	CEN (Japan)	PTS
1	Team Taisan Jr.	26	1	2	Ret	2	1	1	3	93
1	Team Taisan Jr.	28	12				4	DNA		93
1	Team Taisan Jr.	38	9	DNA	8	12	DNA	8		93
2	910 Racing	910		1	4	1	2	Ret	2	65
3	Makiguchi Engineering	72	3	4	1	Ret	10	4		53
4	Cobra Racing Team	31	2	7	Ret	Ret	3	2		49
4	Cobra Racing Team	51	11	6	Ret	10	8	DNA		49
5	imuraya Racing Team	6	4	3	2	9	13	5		47
6	RE Amemiya Racing	7	Ret	9	3	3	5	6	1	40
7	Team Gaikokuya	70	5	5	5	5	Ret	DNA	4	32
8	Hitotsuyama Racing	21	8	Ret	6	6	7	3		31
9	AI Auto Racing	20	6	Ret		4	11	9		18
10	First Racing Team	91			9	8	6	11		11
11	Team Daishin	95	7	Ret	Ret	15	15	10		5
12	Goldenbear Sportswear R.T.	18			7	Ret				4
13	Sports Factory R.T.	57					7	12		3
14	M Factory Racing	11		8	Ret	14				3
15	Kageisen Racing Team	17	10	Ret		11	9			3
-	Hoshino Racing	12		DNA	Ret	Ret	12	7		0
-	Schloss Motorsport	9	13							0
-	NAC West	27				13				0
-	Eimei Auto	14		Ret						0
-	Rank Up Tomei Sports	50		DNA		DNS				0
-	Hirano Motorsport	24				DNS				0
-	Team Spirit	76		DNA						0
Rank	Team	No.	SUZ (Japan)	FUJ (Japan)	SEN (Japan)	FUJ (Japan)	SUG (Japan)	MIN (Japan)	CEN (Japan)	PTS
