= 1995 All Japan Grand Touring Car Championship =

Motor racing championship

The 1995 All Japan Grand Touring Car Championship was the third season of Japan Automobile Federation GT premiere racing, and the second under the promotion of the GT Association (GTA). It was marked as well as the thirteenth season of a JAF-sanctioned sports car racing championship dating back to the All Japan Sports Prototype Championship. Once again, the GT1 class champion was the #1 Calsonic Nissan Skyline GT-R driven by Masahiko Kageyama, and the GT2 class champion was the #70 Gaikokuya Nissan Skyline driven by Yoshimi Ishibashi and Kaoru Hoshino.

1995 saw the Toyota Supra win its first race in the GT1 category, at Sendai Hi-Land Raceway. The victory came just a week after Masanori Sekiya, driver of the winning Castrol TOM's Toyota Supra, became the first Japanese driver to win the 24 Hours of Le Mans overall. The series made its first official visit to Suzuka Circuit on April 2, 1995.

== Schedule ==
Round	Race	Circuit	Date
1	Suzuka GT 300	(Japan) Suzuka Circuit	April 2
2	All Japan Fuji GT Race	(Japan) Fuji Speedway	May 4
3	HiLand GT&F3 Race	(Japan) Sendai Hi-Land Raceway	June 25
4	Japan Special GT-Cup	(Japan) Fuji Speedway	August 13
5	SUGO GT Championship	(Japan) Sportsland SUGO	September 10
6	Sanyo Shinpan Cup Grand Touring Car Endurance Race	(Japan) Mine Circuit	October 1

== Teams & Drivers ==
=== GT1 ===
Team	Make	Car	Engine	No.	Drivers	Tyre	Rounds
Calsonic Hoshino Racing	Nissan	Nissan Skyline GT-R (R32)	Nissan RB26DETT 2.6 L Twin Turbo I6	1	(Japan) Masahiko Kageyama	B	1
Calsonic Hoshino Racing	Nissan	Nissan Skyline GT-R (R33)	Nissan RB26DETT 2.6 L Twin Turbo I6	1	(Japan) Masahiko Kageyama	B	2–6
Calsonic Hoshino Racing	Nissan	Nissan Skyline GT-R (R33)	Nissan RB26DETT 2.6 L Twin Turbo I6	1	(Japan) Kazuyoshi Hoshino	B	3–6
Team Zexel	Nissan	Nissan Skyline GT-R (R32)	Nissan RB26DETT 2.6 L Twin Turbo I6	2	(Japan) Kenji Tohira	Y	1–2
Team Zexel	Nissan	Nissan Skyline GT-R (R32)	Nissan RB26DETT 2.6 L Twin Turbo I6	2	(Japan) Hiroyuki Kawai	Y	1–2
Team Zexel	Nissan	Nissan Skyline GT-R (R33)	Nissan RB26DETT 2.6 L Twin Turbo I6	2	(Japan) Kenji Tohira	Y	3–6
Team Zexel	Nissan	Nissan Skyline GT-R (R33)	Nissan RB26DETT 2.6 L Twin Turbo I6	2	(Japan) Hiroyuki Kawai	Y	3–6
Hasemi Motorsport	Nissan	Nissan Skyline GT-R (R32)	Nissan RB26DETT 2.6 L Twin Turbo I6	3	(Japan) Masahiro Hasemi	B	1
Hasemi Motorsport	Nissan	Nissan Skyline GT-R (R33)	Nissan RB26DETT 2.6 L Twin Turbo I6	3	(Japan) Masahiro Hasemi	B	2–6
Racing Team Nakaharu	Nissan	Nissan Skyline GT-R (R32)	Nissan RB26DETT 2.6 L Twin Turbo I6	4	(Japan) Hideo Fukuyama	B	4–5
Racing Team Nakaharu	Nissan	Nissan Skyline GT-R (R32)	Nissan RB26DETT 2.6 L Twin Turbo I6	4	(Japan) Mizunori Fumino	B	4–5
Rank Up Tomei Sports	Porsche	Porsche 911 GT2	Porsche M64/81 3.6 L Turbo F6	5	(Japan) Koichi Kashiwabara	Y	1–5
Rank Up Tomei Sports	Porsche	Porsche 911 GT2	Porsche M64/81 3.6 L Turbo F6	5	(Japan) Yukihiro Hane	Y	1–2
Rank Up Tomei Sports	Porsche	Porsche 911 GT2	Porsche M64/81 3.6 L Turbo F6	5	(Japan) Minoru Tanaka	Y	4–5
FET Racing Team	Toyota	Toyota Supra	Toyota 3S-GT 2.0 L Turbo I4	8	(Japan) Naoki Nagasaka	B	All
FET Racing Team	Toyota	Toyota Supra	Toyota 3S-GT 2.0 L Turbo I4	8	(Japan) Kiyoshi Misaki	B	1
Nismo	Nissan	Nissan Skyline GT-R (R33)	Nissan RB26DETT 2.6 L Twin Turbo I6	10	(Japan) Akira Iida	B	3–6
Nismo	Nissan	Nissan Skyline GT-R (R33)	Nissan RB26DETT 2.6 L Twin Turbo I6	10	(Japan) Toshio Suzuki	B	3
Nismo	Nissan	Nissan Skyline GT-R (R33)	Nissan RB26DETT 2.6 L Twin Turbo I6	55	(Japan) Toshio Suzuki	B	1–2, 4–6
Nismo	Nissan	Nissan Skyline GT-R (R33)	Nissan RB26DETT 2.6 L Twin Turbo I6	55	(Japan) Akira Iida	B	1–2
Prova Motorsport	Porsche	Porsche 964 RS	Porsche M64/04 3.8 L F6	15	(Japan) Naohiro Furuya	B	All
Prova Motorsport	Porsche	Porsche 964 RS	Porsche M64/04 3.8 L F6	15	(Japan) Hideyuki Tamamoto	B	4
Prova Motorsport	Porsche	Porsche 964 RS	Porsche M64/04 3.8 L F6	15	(Japan) Hisashi Wada	B	5
Prova Motorsport	Porsche	Porsche 964 RS	Porsche M64/04 3.8 L F6	15	(Canada) Scott Maxwell	B	6
Team-Jun	Nissan	Nissan Skyline GT-R (R32)	Nissan SR20DET 2.0 L Turbo I4	19	(Japan) Katsuo Kobayashi	Y	All
Dandelion Racing	Nissan	Nissan Skyline GT-R (R32)	Nissan RB26DETT 2.6 L Twin Turbo I6	22	(Japan) Katsuo Mizunuma	Y	5
Dandelion Racing	Nissan	Nissan Skyline GT-R (R32)	Nissan RB26DETT 2.6 L Twin Turbo I6	22	(Japan) Mitsuo Akimoto	Y	5
Team LeMans	Nissan	Nissan Fairlady Z LM	Nissan VH45DE 4.5 L V8	25	(Japan) Masami Kageyama	Y	1–2, 4–6
Team Take One	Porsche	Porsche 911 GT2	Porsche M64/81 3.6 L Turbo F6	30	(Japan) Eiichi Tajima	B	All
Team Take One	Porsche	Porsche 911 GT2	Porsche M64/81 3.6 L Turbo F6	30	(Japan) Yoji Yamada	B	1–2, 4–6
Team Taisan	Porsche	Porsche 911 GT2	Porsche M64/81 3.6 L Turbo F6	33	(Japan) Hideshi Matsuda	Y	2–3
Team Taisan	Porsche	Porsche 911 GT2	Porsche M64/81 3.6 L Turbo F6	33	(Japan) Kaoru Iida	Y	2, 4
Team Taisan	Porsche	Porsche 911 GT2	Porsche M64/81 3.6 L Turbo F6	33	(Japan) Keiichi Suzuki	Y	3–4
Team Taisan	Ferrari	Ferrari F40 LM	Ferrari F120B 2.9 L Twin Turbo V8	34	(United Kingdom) Anthony Reid	Y	1–2
Team Taisan	Ferrari	Ferrari F40 LM	Ferrari F120B 2.9 L Twin Turbo V8	34	(Japan) Masahiko Kondo	Y	2
Team Taisan	Porsche	Porsche 911 GT2	Porsche M64/81 3.6 L Turbo F6	34	(Japan) Hideshi Matsuda	Y	4–6
Team Taisan	Porsche	Porsche 911 GT2	Porsche M64/81 3.6 L Turbo F6	34	(Japan) Takeshi Tsuchiya	Y	4
Team Taisan	Porsche	Porsche 911 GT2	Porsche M64/81 3.6 L Turbo F6	34	(Argentina) Oscar Larrauri	Y	5
Team Taisan	Porsche	Porsche 911 GT2	Porsche M64/81 3.6 L Turbo F6	34	(Japan) Keiichi Suzuki	Y	6
Team Taisan	Porsche	Porsche 911 GT2	Porsche M64/81 3.6 L Turbo F6	35	(Japan) Keiichi Suzuki	Y	1–2
Team Taisan	Porsche	Porsche 911 GT2	Porsche M64/81 3.6 L Turbo F6	35	(Japan) Hideshi Matsuda	Y	1
Team Taisan	Porsche	Porsche 911 GT2	Porsche M64/81 3.6 L Turbo F6	35	(Japan) Takeshi Tsuchiya	Y	2
Team Taisan	Porsche	Porsche 911 GT2	Porsche M64/81 3.6 L Turbo F6	35	(United Kingdom) Anthony Reid	Y	3–6
Team Taisan	Porsche	Porsche 911 GT2	Porsche M64/81 3.6 L Turbo F6	35	(Japan) Masahiko Kondo	Y	3–6
Team Taisan	Ferrari	Ferrari F40 LM	Ferrari F120B 2.9 L Twin Turbo V8	40	(Japan) Tetsuya Ota	Y	1-2, 4, 6
Team Taisan	Ferrari	Ferrari F40 LM	Ferrari F120B 2.9 L Twin Turbo V8	40	(Argentina) Oscar Larrauri	Y	1, 4, 6
Castrol Toyota Team TOM'S	Toyota	Toyota Supra	Toyota 3S-GT 2.0 L Turbo I4	36	(Japan) Masanori Sekiya	B	All
Castrol Toyota Team TOM'S	Toyota	Toyota Supra	Toyota 3S-GT 2.0 L Turbo I4	36	(Germany) Michael Krumm	B	All
Toyota Team Cerumo	Toyota	Toyota Supra	Toyota 3S-GT 2.0 L Turbo I4	38	(France) Érik Comas	B	All
Toyota Team SARD	Toyota	Toyota Supra	Toyota 3S-GT 2.0 L Turbo I4	39	(United States) Jeff Krosnoff	D	All
Aiwa Racing Project	Nissan	Nissan Silvia (S13)	Nissan SR20DET 2.0 L Turbo I4	41	(Japan) Kunio Date	Y	1–2, 4–6
Aiwa Racing Project	Nissan	Nissan Silvia (S13)	Nissan SR20DET 2.0 L Turbo I4	41	(Japan) Akira Ishikawa	Y	1–2, 4–6
Team Razo	Nissan	Nissan Skyline GT-R (R33)	Nissan RB26DETT 2.6 L Twin Turbo I6	66	(Japan) Takahiko Hara	T	2
Team Razo	Nissan	Nissan Skyline GT-R (R33)	Nissan RB26DETT 2.6 L Twin Turbo I6	66	(Japan) Hisashi Wada	T	2
Endless Sports	Nissan	Nissan Skyline GT-R (R33)	Nissan RB26DETT 2.6 L Twin Turbo I6	81	(Japan) Mitsuhiro Kinoshita	Y	4
Endless Sports	Nissan	Nissan Skyline GT-R (R33)	Nissan RB26DETT 2.6 L Twin Turbo I6	81	(Japan) Yasushi Kikuchi	Y	4
KEN WOLF with Terai Engineering	Lamborghini	Lamborghini Diablo Jota	Lamborghini L522 5.7 L V12	88	(Japan) Takao Wada	Y	1, 3–6
KEN WOLF with Terai Engineering	Lamborghini	Lamborghini Diablo Jota	Lamborghini L522 5.7 L V12	88	(Japan) Satoshi Ikezawa	Y	1, 3–5
KEN WOLF with Terai Engineering	Lamborghini	Lamborghini Diablo Jota	Lamborghini L522 5.7 L V12	88	(Japan) Tatsuhiko Kaneumi	Y	6
Team Kunimitsu	Porsche	Porsche 964 RS	Porsche M64/04 3.8 L F6	99	(Japan) Ryō Michigami	Y	4–6
Team Kunimitsu	Porsche	Porsche 911 GT2	Porsche M64/81 3.6 L Turbo F6	100	(Japan) Kunimitsu Takahashi	Y	All
Team Kunimitsu	Porsche	Porsche 911 GT2	Porsche M64/81 3.6 L Turbo F6	100	(Japan) Keiichi Tsuchiya	Y	All

=== GT2 ===
Team	Make	Car	Engine	No.	Drivers	Tyre	Rounds
Schloss Motorsport	Porsche	Porsche 964 RS	Porsche M64/80 3.8 L F6	6	(Japan) Tsunefumi Hioki	D	1
Schloss Motorsport	Porsche	Porsche 964 RS	Porsche M64/80 3.8 L F6	6	(Japan) Shunji Yatsushiro	D	1
RE Amemiya Racing	Mazda	Mazda RX-7 (FD3S)	Mazda RE13B 1.3 L 2-rotor	7	(Japan) Hironori Takeuchi	D	2–6
RE Amemiya Racing	Mazda	Mazda RX-7 (FD3S)	Mazda RE13B 1.3 L 2-rotor	7	(Japan) Haruhiko Matsumoto	D	2–6
M Factory Racing Club	Nissan	Nissan Skyline GTS-R (HR31)	Nissan SR20DET 2.0 L Turbo I4	11	(Japan) Hiromoto Ishimori	B	2–5
Eimei Auto	Mitsubishi	Mitsubishi Mirage C53A	Mitsubishi 4G63 2.0 L I4	12	(Japan) Akira Nagai	D	4
Amuze Racing	Mazda	Mazda RX-7 (FC3S)	Mazda RE31B 1.3 L 2-rotor	13	(Japan) Atsushi Hayakawa	D	2
Amuze Racing	Mazda	Mazda RX-7 (FC3S)	Mazda RE31B 1.3 L 2-rotor	13	(Japan) Nobuhiro Yoshida	D	2
Kageisen Racing Team	Mazda	Mazda RX-7 (FC3S)	Mazda RE13B 1.3 L 2-rotor	17	(Japan) Toshihiko Nogami	Y	2–5
Kageisen Racing Team	Mazda	Mazda RX-7 (FC3S)	Mazda RE13B 1.3 L 2-rotor	17	(Japan) Toshiaki Koshimizu	Y	2–5
Elite Racing Corporation	Mazda	Mazda RX-7 (FC3S)	Mazda RE13B 1.3 L 2-rotor	18	(Japan) Toshio Fukushima	Y	2–5
Elite Racing Corporation	Mazda	Mazda RX-7 (FC3S)	Mazda RE13B 1.3 L 2-rotor	18	(Japan) Tetsuya Kawasaki	Y	2–3, 5
Hitotsuyama Racing	BMW	BMW M3 (E30)	BMW S14 2.5 L I4	21	(Japan) Shoichi Ito	Y	5
Hitotsuyama Racing	BMW	BMW M3 (E30)	BMW S14 2.5 L I4	21	(Japan) Yosuke Hitotsuyama	Y	5
B.H. Studio Racing	Porsche	Porsche 964 RSR	Porsche M64/80 3.8 L F6	23	(Japan) Takashi Suzuki	Y	3–5
B.H. Studio Racing	Porsche	Porsche 964 RSR	Porsche M64/80 3.8 L F6	23	(Japan) Naoto Sugita	Y	3–5
Team Taisan	BMW	BMW M3 (E30)	BMW S14 2.5 L I4	26	(Japan) Motoji Sekine	Y	1–3
Team Taisan	BMW	BMW M3 (E30)	BMW S14 2.5 L I4	26	(Japan) Fumio Mutoh	Y	1–3
Team Taisan	BMW	BMW M3 (E30)	BMW S14 2.5 L I4	26	(Japan) Junichi Yamanashi	Y	4–5
Team Taisan	BMW	BMW M3 (E30)	BMW S14 2.5 L I4	26	(Japan) Masaoki Nagashima	Y	4–5
Team Taisan	BMW	BMW M3 (E30)	BMW S14 2.5 L I4	28	(Japan) Motoji Sekine	Y	5–6
Team Taisan	BMW	BMW M3 (E30)	BMW S14 2.5 L I4	28	(Japan) Fumio Mutoh	Y	5–6
NAC West	Nissan	Nissan Skyline GTS-R (HR31)	Nissan SR20DET 2.0 L Turbo I4	27	(Japan) Michiaki Hayashi	D	2, 4
NAC West	Nissan	Nissan Skyline GTS-R (HR31)	Nissan SR20DET 2.0 L Turbo I4	27	(Japan) Toshikazu Kanamori	D	2
NAC West	Nissan	Nissan Skyline GTS-R (HR31)	Nissan SR20DET 2.0 L Turbo I4	27	(Japan) Mamoru Suzuki	D	4
Cobra Racing Team	Porsche	Porsche 964 RSR	Porsche M64/80 3.8 L F6	31	(Japan) Katsunori Iketani	Y	2–5
Cobra Racing Team	Porsche	Porsche 964 RSR	Porsche M64/80 3.8 L F6	31	(Japan) Masamitsu Ishihara	Y	2–3
Cobra Racing Team	Porsche	Porsche 964 RSR	Porsche M64/80 3.8 L F6	31	(Japan) Seiichi Sodeyama	Y	5–6
Ohyama Racing	Nissan	Nissan Skyline GT-R	Nissan RB26DETT 2.6 L Twin Turbo I6	32	(Japan) Shigeru Ohyama	Y	1–2
Ohyama Racing	Nissan	Nissan Skyline GT-R	Nissan RB26DETT 2.6 L Twin Turbo I6	32	(Japan) Jun Okanoya	Y	1–2
S2 Brain	Porsche	Porsche 964 RSR	Porsche M64/80 3.8 L F6	54	(Japan) Seiichi Sodeyama	Y	2–3
S2 Brain	Porsche	Porsche 964 RSR	Porsche M64/80 3.8 L F6	54	(Japan) Masahisa Nakada	Y	2–3
Yoshimi Ishibashi	Nissan	Nissan Skyline GTS-R (HR31)	Nissan SR20DET 2.0 L Turbo I4	70	(Japan) Yoshimi Ishibashi	B	All
Yoshimi Ishibashi	Nissan	Nissan Skyline GTS-R (HR31)	Nissan SR20DET 2.0 L Turbo I4	70	(Japan) Kaoru Hoshino	B	All
Makiguchi Engineering	BMW	BMW E36	BMW S14 2.5 L I4	71	(Japan) Tsuyoshi Yamagishi	Y	2–6
Makiguchi Engineering	BMW	BMW E36	BMW S14 2.5 L I4	71	(Japan) Toshifumi Kurosu	Y	2–5
Makiguchi Engineering	BMW	BMW E36	BMW S14 2.5 L I4	71	(Japan) Kazuhiro Koizumi	Y	6
Makiguchi Engineering	BMW	BMW E36	BMW S14 2.5 L I4	72	(Japan) Katsuya Makiguchi	Y	1
Makiguchi Engineering	BMW	BMW E36	BMW S14 2.5 L I4	72	(Japan) Hideo Fukuyama	Y	1
Makiguchi Engineering	BMW	BMW E36	BMW S14 2.5 L I4	72	(Japan) Norio Makiguchi	Y	2–5
Makiguchi Engineering	BMW	BMW E36	BMW S14 2.5 L I4	72	(Japan) Toru Horigome	Y	2–3
Makiguchi Engineering	BMW	BMW E36	BMW S14 2.5 L I4	72	(Japan) Takayuki Kinoshita	Y	4–5

== Season results ==
Round	Circuit	GT1 Winning Team	GT2 Winning Team
Round	Circuit	GT1 Winning Drivers	GT2 Winning Drivers
1	Suzuka Circuit	#1 Calsonic Hoshino Racing GT-R	#70 Team Gaikokuya Nissan Skyline
1	Suzuka Circuit	(Japan) Masahiko Kageyama	(Japan) Yoshimi Ishibashi (Japan) Kaoru Hoshino
2	Mt. Fuji	#33 Team Taisan Porsche 911 GT2	#70 Team Gaikokuya Nissan Skyline
2	Mt. Fuji	(Japan) Hideshi Matsuda (Japan) Kaoru Iida	(Japan) Yoshimi Ishibashi (Japan) Kaoru Hoshino
3	Sendai	#36 Castrol TOM'S Toyota Supra	#7 RE Amemiya Mazda RX-7
3	Sendai	(Japan) Masanori Sekiya (Germany) Michael Krumm	(Japan) Hironori Takeuchi (Japan) Haruhiko Matsumoto
4	Mt. Fuji	#3 Hasemi Motorsports GT-R	#72 Makiguchi Engineering BMW M3
4	Mt. Fuji	(Japan) Masahiro Hasemi	(Japan) Norio Makiguchi (Japan) Takayuki Kinoshita
5	Sportsland SUGO	#35 Team Taisan Porsche 911 GT2	#31 Cobra Racing Team Porsche 993
5	Sportsland SUGO	(United Kingdom) Anthony Reid (Japan) Masahiko Kondō	(Japan) Seiichi Sodeyama (Japan) Katsunori Iketani
6	Mine Circuit	#34 Team Taisan Porsche 911 GT2	#7 RE Amemiya Mazda RX-7
6	Mine Circuit	(Japan) Hideshi Matsuda (Japan) Keiichi Suzuki	(Japan) Hironori Takeuchi (Japan) Haruhiko Matsumoto

== Point Ranking ==
=== GT1 Drivers' standings ===
==== Drivers' standings ====
Scoring system

Position	1st	2nd	3rd	4th	5th	6th	7th	8th	9th	10th
Points	20	15	12	10	8	6	4	3	2	1

Rank	Driver	SUZ (Japan)	FUJ (Japan)	SEN (Japan)	FUJ (Japan)	SUG (Japan)	MIN (Japan)	PTS
1	(Japan) Masahiko Kageyama	1	10	2	7	2	3	67
2	(Japan) Masahiro Hasemi	4	2	14	1	4	6	61
3	(Japan) Toshio Suzuki	2	4	6	2	5	7	58
4	(Japan) Hideshi Matsuda	Ret	1	8	5	6	1	57
5	(Germany) Michael Krumm	6	6	1	Ret	7	4	46
6	(Japan) Masanori Sekiya	6	6	1	Ret	7	4	42
7	(United Kingdom) Anthony Reid	11	Ret	3	9	1	9	36
8	(United States) Jeff Krosnoff	3	12	5	16	3	11	32
9	(Japan) Akira Iida	2	4	6	3	9	Ret	35
10	(Japan) Kunimitsu Takahashi (Japan) Keiichi Tsuchiya	14	3	4	8	8	Ret	28
12	(Japan) Naoki Nagasaka	8	5	10	4	Ret	Ret	22
13	(Japan) Eiichi Tajima	10	Ret	7	10	Ret	2	21
14	(Japan) Kazuyoshi Hoshino			2	7	2	3	19
15	(Japan) Masahiko Kondo	11		3	9	1	9	16
16	(Japan) Kenji Tohira (Japan) Hiroyuki Kawai	9	15	11	Ret	Ret	5	10
16	(Japan) Koichi Kashiwabara	7	8	9	12	10		10
19	(France) Érik Comas	5	14	15	Ret	11	DSQ	8
20	(Japan) Keiichi Suzuki	Ret	7	8	Ret		1	7
20	(Japan) Yukihiro Hane	7	8					7
22	(Japan) Hideo Fukuyama (Japan) Mizunori Fumino				6	Ret		6
24	(Japan) Takeshi Tsuchiya		7		5			4
25	(Japan) Kiyoshi Misaki	8						3
25	(Japan) Ryō Michigami				14	12	8	3
27	(Japan) Tetsuya Ota	Ret	9		18		12	2
27	(Japan) Yoji Yamada	10	Ret		10	Ret	2	2
29	(Japan) Katsuo Kobayashi	Ret	13	12	11	Ret	10	1
29	(Japan) Minoru Tanaka			12	10			1
-	(Japan) Kaoru Iida		1		Ret			0
-	(Argentina) Oscar Larrauri	Ret			18	6	12	0
-	(Japan) Kunio Date (Japan) Akira Ishikawa	Ret	11		Ret		Ret	0
-	(Japan) Masami Kageyama	12	DNS		Ret	Ret	Ret	0
-	(Japan) Takao Wada	15		13	13	Ret	Ret	0
-	(Japan) Satoshi Ikezawa	15		13	13	Ret		0
-	(Japan) Naohiro Furuya	13	DNS	Ret		DNS	Ret	0
-	(Japan) Mitsuhiro Kinoshita (Japan) Yasushi Kikuchi				17			0
-	(Japan) Hisashi Wada		Ret			DNS		0
-	(Japan) Takahiko Hara		Ret					0
-	(Japan) Katsuo Mizunuma (Japan) Mitsuo Akimoto				DNS	Ret		0
-	(Japan) Tatsuhiko Kaneumi						Ret	0
-	(Canada) Scott Maxwell						Ret	0
Rank	Driver	SUZ (Japan)	FUJ (Japan)	SEN (Japan)	FUJ (Japan)	SUG (Japan)	MIN (Japan)	PTS

Colour	Result
Gold	Winner
Silver	Second place
Bronze	Third place
Green	Points classification
Blue	Non-points classification
Blue	Non-classified finish (NC)
Purple	Retired, not classified (Ret)
Red	Did not qualify (DNQ)
Red	Did not pre-qualify (DNPQ)
Black	Disqualified (DSQ)
White	Did not start (DNS)
White	Withdrew (WD)
White	Race cancelled (C)
Blank	Did not practice (DNP)
Blank	Did not arrive (DNA)
Blank	Excluded (EX)

==== GT1 Teams' standings ====
For teams that entered multiple cars, only the best result from each round counted towards the teams' championship.

Rank	Team	No.	SUZ (Japan)	FUJ (Japan)	SEN (Japan)	FUJ (Japan)	SUG (Japan)	MIN (Japan)	PTS
1	Team Taisan	33		1	8	Ret			80
1	Team Taisan	34	11	Ret	3	5	6	1	80
1	Team Taisan	35	Ret	7		9	1	9	80
1	Team Taisan	40	Ret	9		18		12	80
2	Hoshino Racing	1	1	10	2	7	2	3	67
3	Hasemi Motorsports	3	4	2	14	1	4	6	61
4	Nismo	10				3	9	Ret	58
4	Nismo	55	2	4	6	2	5	7	58
5	Toyota Castrol Team TOM'S	36	6	6	1	Ret	7	4	46
6	Toyota Team SARD	39	3	12	5	16	3	11	32
7	Team Kunimitsu	99				14	12	8	30
7	Team Kunimitsu	100	14	3	4	8	8	Ret	30
8	Team Take One	30	10	Ret	7	10	Ret	2	27
9	FET Racing Team	8	8	5	10	4	Ret	Ret	14
10	Rank Up Tomei Sports	5	7	8	9	12	10		10
10	Team Zexel	2	9	15	11	Ret	Ret	5	10
12	Toyota Team Cerumo	38	5	14	15	Ret	11	DSQ	8
13	Racing Team Nakaharu	4				6	Ret		6
14	Team-Jun	19	Ret	13	12	11	Ret	10	1
-	Aiwa Racing Project	41	Ret	11		Ret		Ret	0
-	Team LeMans	25	12	DNS		Ret	Ret	Ret	0
-	JLOC	88	15		13	13	Ret	Ret	0
-	Prova Motorsport	15	13	DNS	Ret		DNS	Ret	0
-	Endless Sports	81				17			0
-	Team Razo	66		Ret					0
-	Dandelion Racing	22				Ret	DNS		0
Rank	Team	No.	SUZ (Japan)	FUJ (Japan)	SEN (Japan)	FUJ (Japan)	SUG (Japan)	MIN (Japan)	PTS

=== GT2 Drivers' standings ===
==== Drivers' standings ====
Scoring system

Position	1st	2nd	3rd	4th	5th	6th	7th	8th	9th	10th
Points	20	15	12	10	8	6	4	3	2	1

Rank	Driver	SUZ (Japan)	FUJ (Japan)	SEN (Japan)	FUJ (Japan)	SUG (Japan)	MIN (Japan)	PTS
1	(Japan) Yoshimi Ishibashi (Japan) Kaoru Hoshino	1	1	2	3	3	Ret	79
3	(Japan) Hironori Takeuchi (Japan) Haruhiko Matsumoto		9	1	2	Ret	1	57
5	(Japan) Tsuyoshi Yamagishi		5	3	4	2	5	53
6	(Japan) Norio Makiguchi		2	Ret	1	Ret	2	50
6	(Japan) Katsunori Iketani		4	5	Ret	1	3	50
8	(Japan) Kurosu Toshifumi		5	3	4	2		45
9	(Japan) Motoji Sekine (Japan) Fumio Mutoh	4	11	6	Ret	4	4	36
11	(Japan) Takayuki Kinoshita				1	Ret	2	35
12	(Japan) Hiromoto Ishimori		3	4	Ret	8		25
13	(Japan) Shigeru Ohyama (Japan) Jun Okanoya	2	7					19
15	(Japan) Junichi Yamanashi (Japan) Masaoki Nagashima				5	5	Ret	22
17	(Japan) Toru Horigome		2	Ret				15
17	(Japan) Seiichi Sodeyama		Ret	8		1	3	15
19	(Japan) Toshihiko Nogami (Japan) Toshiaki Koshimizu		8	Ret	6	7		13
21	(Japan) Tsunefumi Hioki (Japan) Shunji Yatsushiro	3						12
23	(Japan) Masamitsu Ishihara		4	5				8
23	(Japan) Takashi Suzuki (Japan) Naoto Sugita			7	7	Ret		8
26	(Japan) Michiaki Hayashi		6		Ret			6
26	(Japan) Toshikazu Kanamori		6					6
26	(Japan) Shoichi Ito (Japan) Yosuke Hitotsuyama					6		6
30	(Japan) Masahisa Nakada		Ret	8				3
30	(Japan) Akira Nagai				8			3
32	(Japan) Atsushi Hayakawa (Japan) Nobuhiro Yoshida		10		Ret			1
NC	(Japan) Kazuhiro Koizumi						5	0
NC	(Japan) Toshio Fukushima (Japan) Tetsuya Kawasaki		Ret	Ret	Ret	Ret		0
NC	(Japan) Katsuya Makiguchi (Japan) Hideo Fukuyama	Ret						0
NC	(Japan) Mamoru Suzuki				Ret			0
Rank	Driver	SUZ (Japan)	FUJ (Japan)	SEN (Japan)	FUJ (Japan)	SUG (Japan)	MIN (Japan)	PTS

Colour	Result
Gold	Winner
Silver	Second place
Bronze	Third place
Green	Points classification
Blue	Non-points classification
Blue	Non-classified finish (NC)
Purple	Retired, not classified (Ret)
Red	Did not qualify (DNQ)
Red	Did not pre-qualify (DNPQ)
Black	Disqualified (DSQ)
White	Did not start (DNS)
White	Withdrew (WD)
White	Race cancelled (C)
Blank	Did not practice (DNP)
Blank	Did not arrive (DNA)
Blank	Excluded (EX)

==== GT2 Teams' standings ====
For teams that entered multiple cars, only the best result from each round counted towards the teams' championship.

Rank	Team	No.	SUZ (Japan)	FUJ (Japan)	SEN (Japan)	FUJ (Japan)	SUG (Japan)	MIN (Japan)	PTS
1	Yoshimi Ishibashi	70	1	1	2	3	3	Ret	79
2	Makiguchi Engineering	71		5	3	4	2	5	77
2	Makiguchi Engineering	72	Ret	2	Ret	1	Ret	2	77
3	RE Amemiya Racing	7		9	1	2	Ret	1	57
4	Cobra Racing Team	31		4	5	Ret	1	3	50
5	Team Taisan	26	4	11	6	5	5	Ret	44
5	Team Taisan	28				Ret	4	4	44
6	M Factory Racing Club	11		3	4	Ret	8		25
7	Ohyama Racing	32	2	7					19
8	Kageisen Racing Team	17		8	Ret	6	7		13
9	Schloss Motorsport	6	3						12
10	B.H. Studio Racing	23			7	7	Ret		8
11	NAC West	27		6		Ret			6
12	Hitotsuyama Racing	21					6		14
13	S2 Brain	54		Ret	8				3
14	Eimei Auto	12				8			10
15	Amuze Racing	13		10		Ret			1
-	Elite Racing Corporation	18		Ret	Ret	Ret	Ret		0
Rank	Team	No.	SUZ (Japan)	FUJ (Japan)	SEN (Japan)	FUJ (Japan)	SUG (Japan)	MIN (Japan)	PTS

== Notes ==
1.Masahiko Kondō did not met the requirement for minimum distance driven and was ineligible for championship points.
