= Kenji Tohira =

Japanese racing driver (1941–2024)

Kenji Tohira (Shinjitai: 都平 健二, 15 February 1941 – 25 April 2024) was a Japanese racing driver. Born in Ibaraki on 15 February 1941, he died on 25 April 2024, at the age of 83.

== Racing record ==
=== Complete Spa 24 Hour results ===
Year	Team	Co-Drivers	Car	Class	Laps	Pos.	Class Pos.
1990	(Japan) Team Zexel	(Japan) Takayuki Kinoshita (Belgium) Dirk Schoysman	Nissan Skyline GT-R	N/class5	409	13th	3rd

=== Complete Japanese Touring Car Championship (-1993) results ===
Year	Team	Car	Class	1	2	3	4	5	6	DC	Pts
1989	Nismo	Nissan Skyline GTS-R	JTC-1	NIS; Ret	SEN; 4	TSU; 8	SUG; 5	SUZ; 3	FUJ; Ret	?	?

=== Complete JGTC Results ===
Year	Team	Car	Class	1	2	3	4	5	6	DC	Pts
1995	Team Zexel	Nissan Skyline GT-R	GT1	SUZ; 9	FUJ; 25	SEN; 11	FUJ; Ret	SUG; Ret	MIN; 5	16th	10
1996	Limit Motorsports	Nissan Skyline GT-R	GT500	SUZ; 11	FUJ; 10	SEN; 11	FUJ; 6	SUG; 9	MIN	16th	9
