= Kaoru Hoshino =

Japanese racing driver (1947–2022)

Kaoru Hoshino (21 September 1947 – 21 November 2022) was a Japanese racing driver. He was active in the Toyota works team TOM'S from its inception, driving the Toyota Corolla and Toyota Starlet. He was mainly active in touring car racing, and also competed in the |All Japan Touring Car Championship with the Toyota Supra and Toyota Corolla Levin. He continued to compete in the Super Taikyus and the All Japan GT Championship, and in 1995, in the GT2 class of the All Japan GT Championship, he teamed up with Yoshimi Ishibashi to win the series championship with a Nissan Skyline.

Hoshino was best known for being involved in Tetsuya Ota's accident when he was rear-ended by Tomohiko Sunako's Porsche, his tire came off and he was stuck in the pit lane when Ota hit Sunako Kaoru had just touched the wall a little bit. The tire came off and also damaged his car's rear end due to the touch with Sunako.

Hoshino died on 25 November 2022, at the age of 75.

== Racing record ==
=== Complete JGTC results ===
(key) (Races in bold indicate pole position) (Races in italics indicate fastest lap)

Year	Team	Car	Class	1	2	3	4	5	6	7	DC	Pts
1995	Yoshimi Ishibashi	Nissan Skyline	GT2	SUZ; 1	FSW; 1	SEN; 2	FSW; 3	SUG; 3	MIN; Ret		**1st**	**79**
1996	Yoshimi Ishibashi	Porsche 911RS	GT300	SUZ; 5	FSW; 5	SEN; 5	FSW; 5	SUG; Ret	MIN		8th	32
1997	Sigma Tech Racing Team	Porsche 911 GT2	GT300	SUZ	FSW; 6	SEN; 7	FSW; 6	MIN; 2	SUG; 1		5th	51
1998	Sigma Tech Racing Team	Porsche 911 GT2	GT300	SUZ; Ret	FSW; C	SEN; 9	FSW; 4	TRM	MIN	SUG; 16	21st	12
1999	TEAM GAIKOKUYA	Porsche 911 GT2	GT300	SUZ	FSW; 6	SUG	MIN	FSW	TAI; 10	TRM	22nd	7

=== 24 Hours of Le Mans results ===
Year	Team	Co-Drivers	Car	Class	Laps	Pos.	Class Pos.
1985	(Japan) Tom's Team	(Japan) Satoru Nakajima (Japan) Masanori Sekiya	Tom's 85C-L-Toyota	C1	330	12th	12th
1987	(Japan) Toyota Team Tom's	(United Kingdom) Tiff Needell (Japan) Masanori Sekiya	Toyota 87C-L	C1	39	DNF	DNF
1988	(Japan) Toyota Team Tom's	(United Kingdom) Geoff Lees (Japan) Masanori Sekiya	Toyota 88C	C1	351	12th	12th
1989	(Japan) Toyota Team Tom's	(Japan) Keiichi Suzuki (France) Didier Artzet	Toyota 88C	C1	20	DNF	DNF
