= Limited-slip differential =

Differential gearbox that limits the rotational speed difference of output shafts

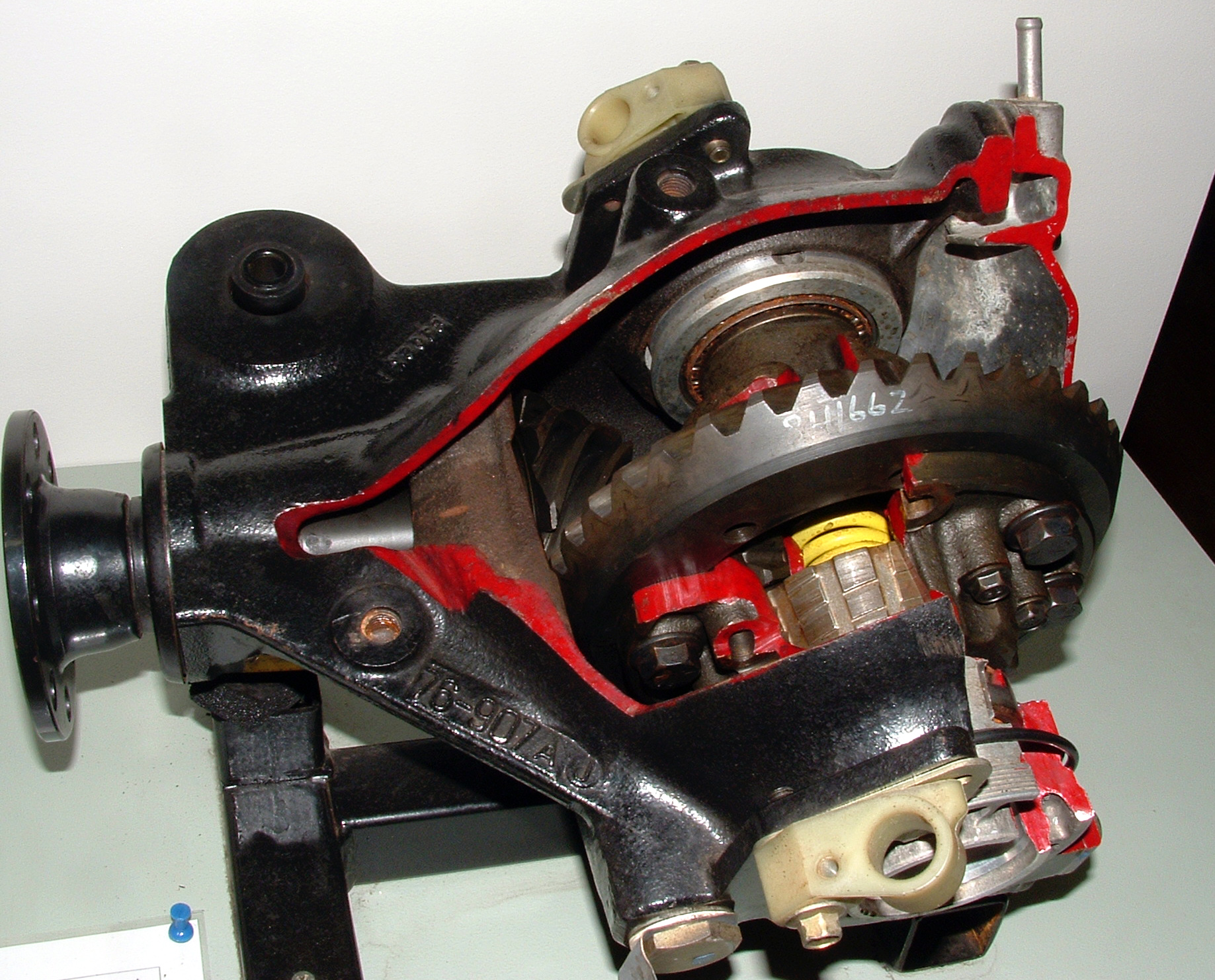
Cone-type LSD

A limited-slip differential (LSD) is a type of differential gear train that for on-road use allows its two output shafts to rotate at different speeds, but limits the maximum difference between the two shafts to enforce a minimum of traction, unlike the open differential that allows one wheel to stand still while all power is applied to the other wheel, or a locking differential that locks them together.

Limited-slip differentials are sometimes known by the generic trademark Positraction, a brand name owned by General Motors and originally used for its Chevrolet branded vehicles.

== Early history ==
In 1932, Ferdinand Porsche designed the P-Wagen Grand Prix racing car, later adopted for Auto Union racing cars. The high power of the supercharged V16 design caused one of the rear wheels to experience excessive wheel spin at any speed up to 160 km/h (100 mph). In 1935, Porsche commissioned the engineering firm ZF to design a limited-slip differential to improve performance. The ZF "sliding pins and cams" became available, and one example was the Type B-70 used during the Second World War in the military VWs (Kübelwagen and Schwimmwagen), although technically this was not a limited-slip differential, but a system composed of two freewheels, which sent the whole of the engine power to the slower-turning of the two wheels.

Limited-slip differentials were widely introduced by U.S. automakers in the late 1950s and were marketed under a wide variety of trademarked names. In early 1956, Packard introduced a clutch-type limited-slip differential under the Twin Traction trademark, promoting it as an aid for driving in severe winter weather. In 1957, General Motors (GM) introduced a competing system for Chevrolet branded vehicles under the Positraction name. Within a few years, other American automotive brands introduced similar systems under a variety of names, including Safe-T-Track for GM's Pontiac brand and Anti Spin for its Oldsmobile brand, while the Ford Motor Company introduced Traction-Lok for Ford vehicles and Directed Power for its Lincoln cars. Chrysler purchased Power-Lok units from Dana Incorporated and Spin-Resistant units from Borg-Warner, marketing both under the Sure-Grip name on Chrysler, Dodge, and Plymouth vehicles. Limited-slip differentials became very popular and sought after during the muscle car era in the 1960s and 1970s. Despite the myriad marketing names used by competing brands, the popularity of Chevrolet vehicles resulted in Positraction becoming a generic trademark in the U.S. for limited-slip differentials generally.

== Characteristics ==
The main advantage of a limited-slip differential is demonstrated by considering the case of a standard (or "open") differential in off-roading or snow situations where one wheel begins to slip. In such a case with a standard differential, the slipping or non-contacting wheel will receive the majority of the power (in the form of low-torque, high-rpm rotation), while the contacting wheel will remain stationary with respect to the ground. The torque transmitted by an open differential will always be equal at both wheels; if one tire is on a slippery surface, the supplied torque will easily overcome the available traction at a very low number. For example, the right tire might begin to spin as soon as 70 N⋅m (50 lb⋅ft) of torque is placed on it, since it is on an icy surface. Since the same amount of torque is always felt at both wheels, regardless of the speed at which they are turning, this means that the wheel with traction cannot receive more than 70 N⋅m (50 lb⋅ft) of torque either, which is far less than is required to move the vehicle. Meanwhile, the tire on the slippery surface will simply spin, absorbing all of the actual power output (which is a function of torque provided over the course of revolutions), even though both wheels are provided the same amount of torque. A limited-slip differential prevents excessive power from being allocated to one wheel, and so keeps both wheels in powered rotation.

The advantages of LSD in high-power, rear-wheel drive automobiles were demonstrated during the United States "Muscle-Car" era from the mid-1960s through the early 1970s. Cars of this era normally were rear-wheel drive and did not feature independent suspension for the rear tires (but instead used a live axle). With a live axle, when high torque is applied through the differential, the traction on the right rear tire is lower as the axle naturally wants to turn with the torsion of the drive shaft (but is held stationary by being mounted to the vehicle frame). This coined the terms "one wheel peel" or "one tire fire". As such, "Muscle-Cars" with LSD or "posi" (positraction) had a distinct advantage to their wheel-spinning counterparts.

Mechanical limited-slip differentials are considered essential to perform a proper drift.

== Basic principle of operation ==
Both limited-slip differentials and open differentials have a gear train that allows the output shafts to spin at different speeds while holding the sum of their speeds proportional to that of the input shaft.

Automotive limited-slip differentials have some type of mechanism that applies a torque (internal to the differential) that resists the relative motion of the output shafts. In simple terms, this means they have some mechanism which resists a speed difference between the outputs, by creating a resisting torque between either the two outputs, or the outputs and the differential housing. There are many mechanisms used to create this resisting torque. Types of limited-slip differential typically are named from the type of the resisting mechanism. Examples include viscous and clutch-based LSDs. The amount of limiting torque provided by these mechanisms varies by design.

A limited-slip differential has a more complex torque-split and should be considered in the case when the outputs are spinning the same speed and when spinning at different speeds. The torque difference between the two axles is called Trq_{d}. (In this work it is called Trq_{f} for torque friction). Trq_{d} is the difference in torque delivered to the left and right wheel. The magnitude of Trq_{d} comes from the slip-limiting mechanism in the differential and may be a function of input torque (as in the case of a gear differential), or the difference in the output speeds (as in the case of a viscous differential).

The torque delivered to the outputs is:

- Trq_{1}= ½ Trq_{in} + ½ Trq_{d} for the slower output
- Trq_{2}= ½ Trq_{in} – ½ Trq_{d} for the faster output

When traveling in a straight line, where one wheel starts to slip (and spin faster than the wheel with traction), torque is reduced to the slipping wheel (Trq_{2}) and provided to the slower wheel (Trq_{1}).

In the case when the vehicle is turning and neither wheel is slipping, the inside wheel will be turning slower than the outside wheel. In this case the inside wheel will receive more torque than the outside wheel, which can result in understeer.

When both wheels are spinning at the same speed, the torque distribution to each wheel is:

- Trq_{(1 or 2)} = ½ Trq_{in} ±(½ Trq_{d}) while
- Trq_{1}+Trq_{2}=Trq_{in}.

This means the maximum torque to either wheel is statically indeterminate but is in the range of ½ Trq_{in} ±( ½ Trq_{d} ).

== Types ==
Several types of LSD are commonly used in passenger cars.

- Fixed value
- Torque sensitive
- Speed sensitive
- Electronically controlled

=== Fixed value ===
In this differential the maximum torque difference between the two outputs, Trq_{d}, is a fixed value at all times regardless of torque input to the differential or speed difference between the two outputs. Typically this differential used spring-loaded clutch assemblies.

=== Torque sensitivity (HLSD) ===
These limited-slip differentials use helical gears, clutches or cones (an alternative type of clutch) where the engagement force of the gears or clutch is a function of the input torque applied to the differential (as the engine applies more torque the gears or clutches grip harder and Trq_{d} increases).

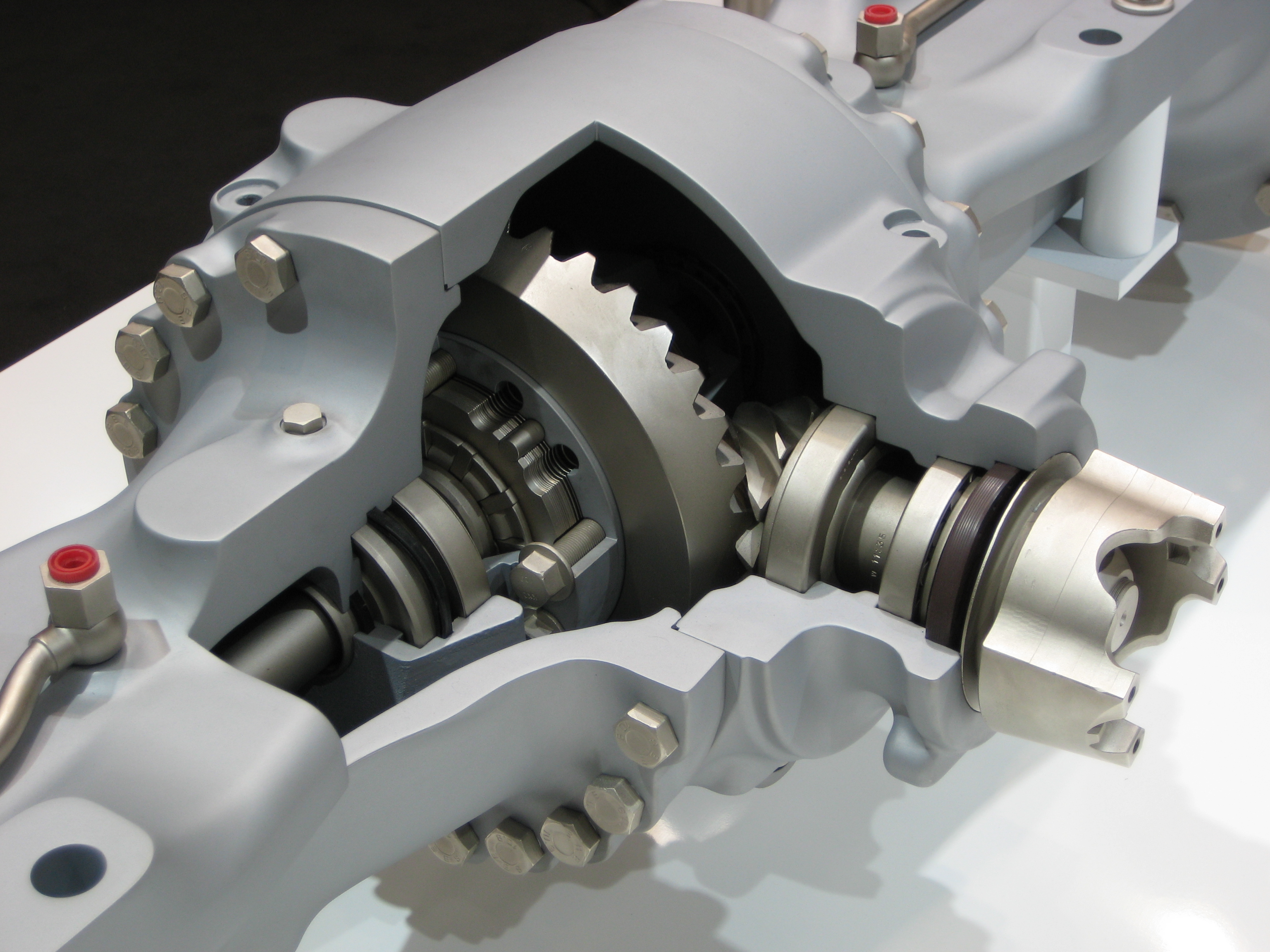
ZF LSD – clutch stack visible on left

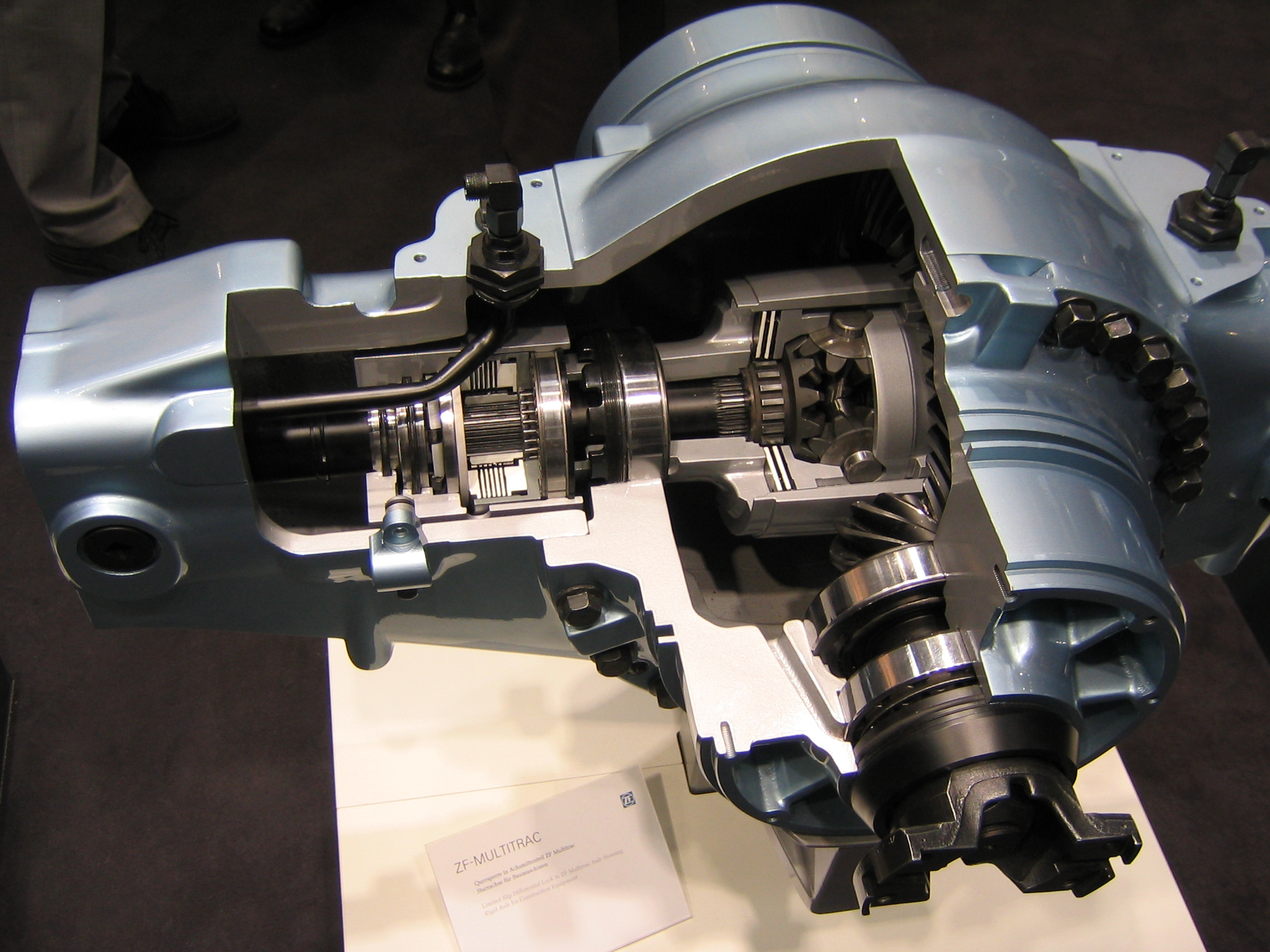
ZF LSD – spider pinion shaft ramps visible

Torque sensing LSDs respond to driveshaft torque, so that the more driveshaft input torque present, the harder the clutches, cones or gears are pressed together, and thus the more closely the drive wheels are coupled to each other. Some include spring loading to provide some small torque so that with little or no input torque (trailing throttle/gearbox in neutral/main clutch depressed) the drive wheels are minimally coupled. The amount of preload (hence static coupling) on the clutches or cones is affected by the general condition (wear) and by how tightly they are loaded.

==== Clutch, cone-type, or plate LSD ====
The clutch type has a stack of thin clutch-discs, half of which are coupled to one of the drive shafts, the other half of which are coupled to the spider gear carrier. The clutch stacks may be present on both drive shafts, or on only one. If on only one, the remaining drive shaft is linked to the clutched drive shaft through the spider gears. In a cone type the clutches are replaced by a pair of cones which are pressed together achieving the same effect.

One method for creating the clamping force is the use of a cam-ramp assembly such as used in a Salisbury/ramp style LSD. The spider gears mount on the pinion cross shaft which rests in angled cutouts forming cammed ramps. The cammed ramps are not necessarily symmetrical. If the ramps are symmetrical, the LSD is 2 way. If they are saw toothed (i.e. one side of the ramp is vertical), the LSD is 1 way. If both sides are sloped, but are asymmetric, the LSD is 1.5 way.

An alternative is to use the natural separation force of the gear teeth to load the clutch. An example is the center differential of the 2011 Audi Quattro RS 5.

As the input torque of the driveshaft tries to turn the differential center, internal pressure rings (adjoining the clutch stack) are forced sideways by the pinion cross shaft trying to climb the ramp, which compresses the clutch stack. The more the clutch stack is compressed, the more coupled the wheels are. The mating of the vertical ramp (80–85° in practice to avoid chipping) surfaces in a one-way LSD on overrun produces no cam effect or corresponding clutch stack compression.

==== 2-Way, 1-Way, 1.5-Way ====
There are three input torque states: load, no load, and over run. During load conditions, as previously stated, the coupling is proportional to the input torque. With no load, the coupling is reduced to the static coupling. The behavior on over run (particularly sudden throttle release) determines whether the LSD is 1 way, 1.5 way, or 2 way.

A 2-way differential will have the same limiting torque Trq_{d} in both the forward and reverse directions. This means the differential will provide some level of limiting action under engine braking. The early Packard Twin Traction unit is designed to function in this manner, which was promoted to provide a different benefit: if one rear drive wheel momentarily leaves the ground when it hits a bump with the differential under load, the airborne wheel will not spin freely and cause the vehicle to break traction when the spinning wheel touches the ground again.

A 1-way differential will provide its limiting action in only one direction. When torque is applied in the opposite direction it behaves like an open differential. In the case of a FWD car it is argued to be safer than a 2-way differential. The argument is if there is no additional coupling on over run, i.e. a 1-way LSD as soon as the driver lifts the throttle, the LSD unlocks and behaves somewhat like a conventional open differential. This is also the best for FWD cars, as it allows the car to turn in on throttle release, instead of ploughing forward.

A 1.5-way differential refers to one where the forward and reverse limiting torques, Trq_{d_fwd, d_rev}, are different but neither is zero as in the case of the 1-way LSD. This type of differential is common in racing cars where a strong limiting torque can aid stability under engine braking.

==== Geared LSD ====
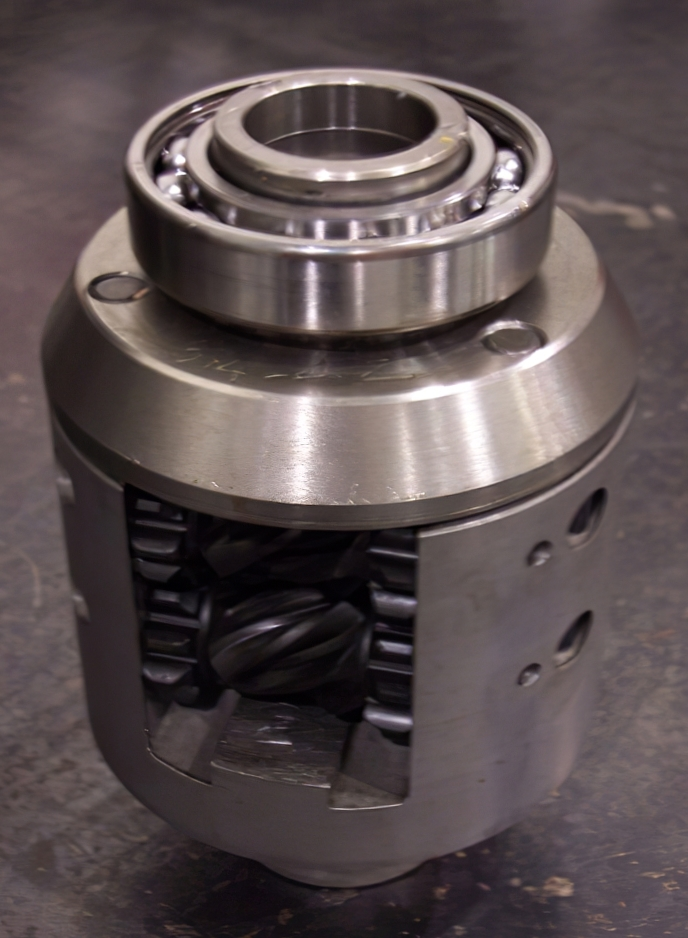
Audi Quattro Torsen Differential

Geared, torque-sensitive mechanical limited-slip differentials use worm gears and spur gears to distribute and differentiate input power between two drive wheels or front and back axles. This is a completely separate design from the most common beveled spider gear designs seen in most automotive applications. As torque is applied to the gears, they are pushed against the walls of the differential housing, creating friction. The friction resists the relative movement of the outputs and creates the limiting torque Trq_{d}.

Unlike other friction-based LSD designs that combine a common spider gear "open" differential in combination with spring-loaded friction components that inhibit differentiation, the torque bias sensing design is inherent in its design, not as an add-on, but is still an LSD type (a design is selected which has inefficient gearing). The result is a differential that does not bind up like some LSD types and locking ones, but still gives increased power delivery under many road conditions.

Examples include:

- Torsen T-1 is the brand name of the original Gleasman differential invented by Vernon Gleasman circa 1949 (US Patent 2,559,916 applied in 1949, granted 1951). The original Gleasman design was sold to The Gleason Works (later named Gleason Corporation), who started marketing it in 1982. The original T-1 model is incompatible with c-clip drive axles, which limited its use with many cars and pick-up trucks of the time. However, the original Torsen differential was used in racing by Mario Andretti and Paul Newman with great success. All later worm gear LSD designs were derived from the original Gleasman differential. The T-1 is original equipment in the Audi Quattro, Subaru Impreza WRX STI, Toyota Mega Cruiser and AM General HMMWV "Humvee".
- Torsen T-2 was a new Gleasman design circa 1984 (US Patent application WO1984003745 A1) that is compatible with c-clip axles. The new design, along with a merger creating Zexel-Gleason U.S.A. increased Torsen availability for OEM and aftermarket applications. Variants include the T-2R, which includes a Positraction style clutch pack that gives preload for racing purposes; and the T-3, a dual differential intended for AWD applications. The T-2 is original equipment in many high performance cars and pick-up trucks.
- Quaife differential, sold under the name Automatic Torque Biasing Differential (ATB Differential®), covered by European Patent No. 130806A2. The Quaife version is most established in Europe and other markets other than the US, providing extensive aftermarket support for European and Japanese brand cars, especially front-wheel drive and all-wheel drive applications. The Mk1 & Mk2 (optional on later Mk3) Ford Focus RS used the Quaife ATB Differential® as original equipment.
- Eaton Corporation is the latest owner of the Truetrac differential, which has been in production for many years. Its design is similar to the Torsen T-2 (slightly less torque bias), and is an aftermarket part for many popular US-made solid axles for rear-wheel drive and 4x4 pick-up trucks. The Truetrac is most often used in the front axle of 4x4 pick-up trucks intended for off-road use, in combination with locking center and rear differentials. As is the case with all geared LSD designs, the Truetrac does not have any negative impact on steering that most other LSD and "locker" designs are prone to.

=== Speed sensitivity ===
Speed-sensitive differentials limit the torque difference between the outputs, Trq_{d}, based on the difference in speed between the two output shafts. Thus for small output speed differences the differential's behavior may be very close to an open differential. As the speed difference increases, the limiting torque increases. This results in different dynamic behavior as compared to a torque sensitive differential.

==== Viscous (VLSD) ====
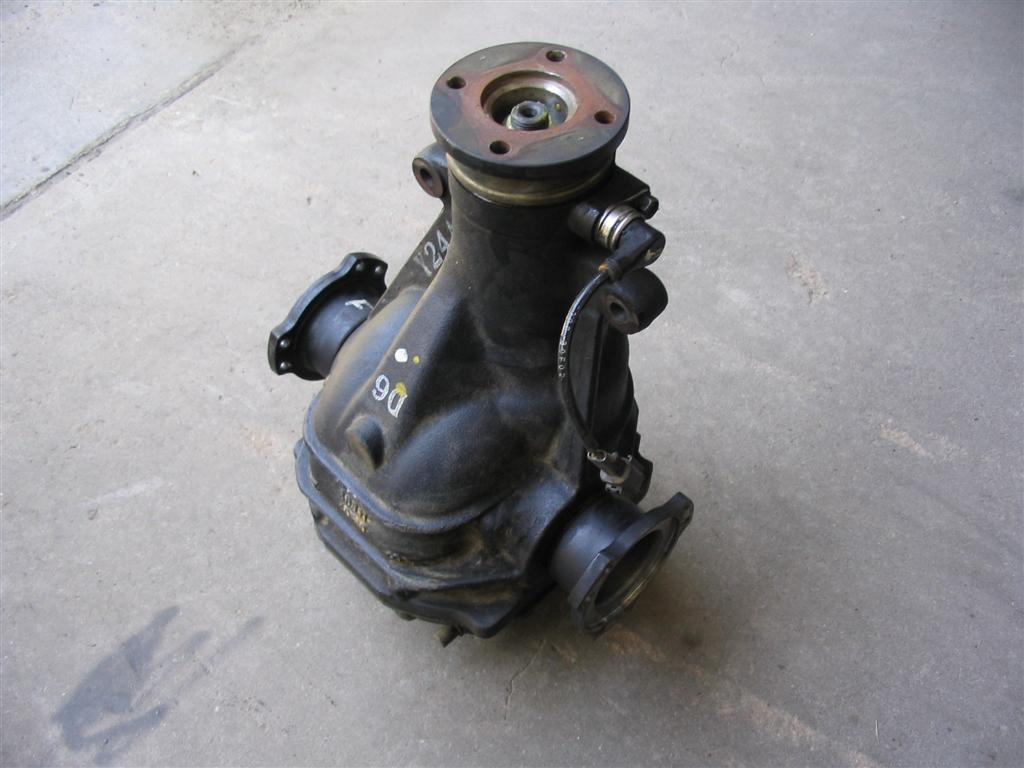
Nissan 240SX Viscous LSD

The viscous type is generally simpler because it relies on hydrodynamic friction from fluids with high viscosity. Silicone-based oils are often used. Here, a cylindrical chamber of fluid filled with a stack of perforated discs rotates with the normal motion of the output shafts. The inside surface of the chamber is coupled to one of the driveshafts, and the outside coupled to the differential carrier. Half of the discs are connected to the inner, the other half to the outer, alternating inner/outer in the stack. Differential motion forces the interleaved discs to move through the fluid against each other. In some viscous couplings when speed is maintained the fluid will accumulate heat due to friction. This heat will cause the fluid to expand, and expand the coupler causing the discs to be pulled together resulting in a non-viscous plate to plate friction and a dramatic drop in speed difference. This is known as the hump phenomenon and it allows the side of the coupler to gently lock. In contrast to the mechanical type, the limiting action is much softer and more proportional to the slip, and so is easier to cope with for the average driver. New Process Gear used a viscous coupling of the Ferguson style in several of their transfer cases including those used in the AMC Eagle.

Viscous LSDs are less efficient than mechanical types, that is, they "lose" some power. In particular, any sustained load which overheats the silicone results in sudden permanent loss of the differential effect. They do have the virtue of failing gracefully, reverting to semi-open differential behavior. Typically a visco-differential that has covered 60,000 miles (97,000 km) or more will be functioning largely as an open differential. The silicone oil is factory sealed in a separate chamber from the gear oil surrounding the rest of the differential. This is not serviceable; when the differential's behavior deteriorates, the VLSD center must be replaced.

==== Gerotor pump ====
This style limited-slip differential works by using a gerotor pump to hydraulically compress a clutch to transfer torque to the wheel that is rotating slower. The gerotor pump uses the differential carrier or cage to drive the outer rotor of the pump and one axle shaft to drive the inner rotor. When there is a difference between the left and right wheels' speed, the pump pressurizes the hydraulic fluid causing the clutch to compress, thereby causing the torque to be transferred to the wheel that is rotating slower. These pump-based systems have lower and upper limits on applied pressure which allows the differential to work like a conventional or open differential until there is a significant speed difference between the right and left wheel, and internal damping to avoid hysteresis. The newest gerotor pump based system has computer regulated output for more versatility and no oscillation.

=== Electronic ===
An electronic limited-slip differential will typically have a planetary or bevel gear set similar to that of an open differential and a clutch pack similar to that in a torque sensitive or gerotor pump based differential. In the electronic unit the clamping force on the clutch is controlled externally by a computer or other controller. This allows the control of the differential's limiting torque, Trq_{d}, to be controlled as part of a total chassis management system. An example of this type of differential is Subaru's DCCD used in the Subaru WRX STi. The Jeep Quadra-Drive II four-wheel-drive system produced beginning in 2005 utilizes this type of differential. Another example is the Porsche PSD system used on the Porsche 928. An additional example is the SAAB XWD (Haldex Generation 4) with eLSD, which uses a common (electronically controlled via the vehicle computer network) hydraulic power pack to control both the longitudinal and transversal torque transfer of the XWD system. The same Haldex system is used on several other GM Epsilon based vehicles such as the Cadillac SRX etc.

=== Electronic systems: brake-based ===
These systems are alternatives to a traditional limited-slip differential. The systems harness various chassis sensors such as speed sensors, anti-lock braking system (ABS) sensors, accelerometers, and microcomputers to electronically monitor wheel slip and vehicle motion. When the chassis control system determines a wheel is slipping, the computer applies the brakes to that wheel. A significant difference between the limited-slip differential systems listed above and this brake-based system, is that brake-based systems do not inherently send the greater torque to the slower wheel, plus the added brake friction material wear that results from the use of such a system if the vehicle is driven in an environment where the brake-based system will activate on a regular basis.

BMW's electronic limited-slip differential used on the F10 5 Series is an example of such a system. Another example began on the first year (1992) production of the re-styled, and new 4.6L V-8 overhead cam Ford Crown Victoria model with its optional anti-lock brakes. This option was available on the 1992 Crown Victoria, onward; on those cars equipped with anti-lock brakes.

=== Other related final drives ===
- Spool
- Locking differential
