= Seiichi Sodeyama =

Japanese racing driver

Seiichi Sodeyama (袖山誠一 - Sodeyama Seiichi; born March 23, 1950) is a retired Japanese professional racing driver.

== Complete JGTC results ==
(key)

Year	Team	Car	Class	1	2	3	4	5	6	7	8	DC	Pts
1994	Racing Team Nakaharu	Nissan Skyline GT-R	GT1	FSW; 2	SEN; 4	FSW; 5	SUG; 5	MIN; 6				3rd	47
1995	S2 Brain	Porsche 911	GT2	SUZ	FSW; Ret	SEN; 8	FSW					17th	15
1995	Cobra Racing Team	Porsche 911	GT2					SUG; 1	MIN; 3			17th	15
1996	910 RACING	Porsche 911 RSR	GT300	SUZ	FSW; 1	SEN; 4	MIN; 1	SUG; 2	MIN; Ret			2nd	65
1997	910 RACING	Porsche 911 RSR	GT300	SUZ; 2	FSW; 8	SEN; 4	FSW; 4	MIN; 12	SUG; 12			6th	38
1998	Cobra Racing Team	Porsche 911	GT300	SUZ; 2	FSW	SEN	FSW	TRM	MIN			16th	15
1998	Yellow Magic	Ferrari F355	GT300							SUG; Ret		16th	15
1999	I.A.Tec Racing Team	Nissan Silvia	GT300	SUZ	FSW; Ret	SUG	MIN	FSW; DNQ	TAI	TRM		NC	0
2000	AUTO STAFF RACING	Nissan Silvia	GT300	TRM	FSW; Ret	SUG; 8	FSW; 8	TAI; 15	MIN; 11	SUZ; 11		22nd	6
2002	TEAM GAIKOKUYA	Porsche 911 GT3R	GT300	TAI	FSW	SUG	SEP	FSW	TRM; 15	MIN	SUZ	NC	0
