= Hisashi Wada =

Japanese racing driver (born 1962)

- Nationality: Japanese
- Born: 7 June 1962 (age 64) Gujō, Gifu, Japan

Super GT career
- Debut season: 1995
- Current team: R'Qs Motor Sports
- Car number: 22
- Former teams: Team Razo, Prova Motorsports, RE Amemiya Racing, JLOC, 910 Racing
- Starts: 186
- Wins: 1
- Podiums: 4
- Poles: 0
- Fastest laps: 1
- Best finish: 3rd in 2000, 2001

Previous series
- 1985–1990 1991–1994 1991–1996: Japanese Formula 3 Championship; Japanese Formula 3000 Championship; Japanese Touring Car Championship

Hisashi Wada (和田 久, Wada Hisashi; born 7 June 1962) is a Japanese racing driver and team principal.

== Racing career ==
Wada began competing in professional motorsports in 1984 in the Suzuka Silver Cup, driving a Toyota AE86; he converted a pole to a win and finished second in the series standings. He would later compete in open-wheeled racing, competing in FJ1600 Championship, Japanese Formula 3 and Japanese Formula 3000 with some success.

Wada first competed in what is now known as Super GT in 1995 as a part-time competitor for two teams, participating in two races. Wada would later move to RE Amemiya Racing and then JLOC, where he would spend much of his career. A move to 910 Racing in 2000 netted him a win and third in the championship two years in a row before moving back to JLOC. While at JLOC, Wada was noted for his aggressive driving style. In 2010, Wada started his own team, R'Qs Motor Sports, where he acts as team principal and the team's representative director.

Wada went by the pseudonym of WADA-Q from 2003 to 2005.

== Racing record ==
=== Complete Japanese Formula 3 results ===
(key) (Races in bold indicate pole position) (Races in italics indicate fastest lap)

Year	Team	Chassis	Engine	1	2	3	4	5	6	7	8	9	10	DC	Points
1985	Okuno Speed	March 783	Toyota 2T-G 2.0 I4	SUZ; Ret	FUJ	SUZ; 22	TSU	NIS	SUZ; 7	SUZ; 14				17th	4
1986	Okuno & Safety Sports	March 783	Toyota 2T-G 2.0 I4	SUZ; 11	FUJ	SUZ	TSU	NIS	TSU	SEN	SUZ	SUZ		NC	0
1986	Special ¥150m Support Car	March 783	Toyota 2T-G 2.0 I4	SUZ	FUJ	SUZ; DSQ	TSU	NIS	TSU	SEN	SUZ	SUZ		NC	0
1988	Choro-Q Racing Team Meiju	Reynard 873	Volkswagen GX 2.0 I4	SUZ	TSU	FUJ	SUZ	SUG	TSU	SEN; Ret	SUZ	NIS; Ret	SUZ; 10	NC	0
1989	Le Garage Cox Racing	Ralt RT32	Volkswagen GX 2.0 I4	SUZ; 23	FUJ; DNS	SUZ; 11	TSU	SUG	TSU	SUZ	NIS	SUZ	SUZ	8th	7
1989	Capcom Racing Team	Ralt RT33	Volkswagen GX 2.0 I4	SUZ	FUJ	SUZ	TSU; DNQ	SUG	TSU	SUZ	NIS	SUZ	SUZ	8th	7
1989	Capcom Racing Team	Ralt RT33	Mugen MF204 2.0 I4	SUZ	FUJ	SUZ	TSU	SUG	TSU; Ret	SUZ; 7	NIS; Ret	SUZ; 6	SUZ; 2	8th	7
1990	Capcom Racing Team	Ralt RT34	Mugen MF204 2.0 I4	**SUZ**; 1	FUJ; Ret	SUZ; Ret	TSU; 4	SEN; 2	SUG; DSQ	TSU; 3	SUZ; 7	NIS; 2	SUZ; 4	**3rd**	**31**

=== Complete Japanese Formula 3000 results ===
(key) (Races in bold indicate pole position) (Races in italics indicate fastest lap)

Year	Team	Chassis	Engine	1	2	3	4	5	6	7	8	9	10	11	DC	Points
1991	Capcom Racing with Funaki Racing	Lola T90/50	Mugen MF308 3.0 V8	SUZ; DNS	AUT; DNQ	FUJ; DNQ	MIN; DNQ	SUZ; 8	SUG; DNQ	FUJ; DNQ	SUZ; DNQ	FUJ; C	SUZ	FUJ; DNS	NC	0
1992	Capcom Racing Team	Lola T91/50 Lola T92/50	Mugen MF308 3.0 V8	SUZ; Ret	FUJ; 5	MIN; 9	SUZ; Ret	AUT; 12	SUG; 16	FUJ; 16	FUJ; 13	SUZ; 11	FUJ; 21	SUZ; 11	16th	2
1993	Capcom Racing Team Hagiwara Racing	Lola T93/50	Mugen MF308 3.0 V8	SUZ; Ret	FUJ; Ret	MIN; Ret	SUZ; Ret	AUT; C	SUG; 24	FUJ; C	FUJ; 13	SUZ; 19	FUJ; Ret	SUZ; 10	NC	0
1994	Stella International	Lola T93/50	Mugen MF308 3.0 V8	SUZ	FUJ	MIN	SUZ	SUG	FUJ	SUZ	FUJ	FUJ; Ret	SUZ; 12		NC	0

=== Complete Japanese Touring Car Championship results ===
(key) (Races in bold indicate pole position) (Races in italics indicate fastest lap)

Year	Team	Car	Class	1	2	3	4	5	6	7	8	9	10	11	12	13	14	15	16	DC	Points
1991	Object T	Toyota Corolla Levin	JTC-3	SUG; 3	SUZ; Ret	TSU; Ret	SEN; 6	AUT; 7	FUJ											?	42
1992	Object T	Toyota Corolla Levin	JTC-3	TIA; 3	AUT; 2	SUG; 3	SUZ; 1	MIN; Ret	TSU; 3	SEN; Ret	FUJ; Ret									8th	57
1995	Team Dome-Kosei	Ford Mondeo	JTCC	FUJ; 1	FUJ; 2	SUG; 1	SUG; 2	TOK; 1	TOK; 2	SUZ; 1	SUZ; 2	MIN; 1	MIN; 2	TAI; 1	TAI; 2	SEN; 1 Ret	SEN; 2 Ret	FUJ; 1 Ret	FUJ; 2; 17	NC	0
1996	Kosei J.P. Team Pures	Ford Mondeo	JTCC	FUJ; 1	FUJ; 2	SUG; 1	SUG; 2	SUZ; 1; 16	SUZ; 2 Ret	MIN; 1; 9	MIN; 2 Ret	SEN; 1 Ret	SEN; 2 Ret	TOK; 1	TOK; 2	FUJ; 1	FUJ; 2			18th	2

=== Complete JGTC/Super GT results ===
(key) (Races in bold indicate pole position) (Races in italics indicate fastest lap)

Year	Team	Car	Class	1	2	3	4	5	6	7	8	9	DC	Points
1995	Team Razo	Nissan Skyline GT-R (R32)	GT1	SUZ	FUJ; Ret	SEN	FUJ						NC	0
1995	Prova Motorsport	Porsche 964 RS	GT1					SUG; DNS	MIN				NC	0
1996	RE Amemiya Racing	Mazda RX-7	GT300	SUZ	FUJ; 9	SEN; 3	FUJ	SUG	MIN				17th	14
1997	JLOC Corsa	Lamborghini Diablo GTR	GT500	SUZ	FUJ; Ret	SEN; Ret	FUJ; 14	MIN; Ret	SUG; 13				NC	0
1998	JLOC Corsa	Lamborghini Diablo GT-1	GT500	SUZ; Ret	FUJ; C	SEN; 9	FUJ; 18	MOT; 10	MIN; 13	SUG; 11			20th	3
1999	JLOC	Lamborghini Diablo GT-1	GT500	SUZ; 15	FUJ; Ret	SUG; 14	MIN; Ret	FUJ; 17	TAI; Ret	MOT; 14			NC	0
2000	910 Racing	Porsche 911 GT3 RS	GT300	MOT; 4	FUJ; 2	SUG; Ret	FUJ; 4	TAI; 1	MIN; 2	SUZ; 4			**3rd**	**80**
2001	910 Racing	Porsche 911 GT3 RS	GT300	TAI; 5	FUJ; 6	SUG; 2	FUJ; 6	MOT; 10	SUZ; 4	MIN; 5			**3rd**	**54**
2002	JLOC	Lamborghini Diablo GT-1	GT500	TAI; DNQ	FUJ; Ret	SUG; 15	SEP; Ret	FUJ; Ret	MOT; 18	MIN; Ret	SUZ; Ret		NC	0
2003	JLOC	Lamborghini Diablo GT-1	GT500	TAI; 15	FUJ; Ret	SUG; Ret	FUJ; 16	FUJ; 15	MOT; 15	AUT; Ret	SUZ; Ret		NC	0
2004	JLOC	Lamborghini Murciélago R-GT	GT500	TAI	SUG; DNQ	SEP; Ret	TOK; DNQ	MOT; Ret	AUT; Ret	SUZ; 15			NC	0
2005	JLOC	Lamborghini Murciélago R-GT	GT500	OKA; 13	FUJ; DNS	SEP							NC	0
2005	JLOC	Lamborghini Murciélago RG-1	GT300				SUG; Ret	MOT; 11	FUJ; 8	AUT	SUZ; Ret		18th	3
2006	JLOC	Lamborghini Murciélago RG-1	GT300	SUZ; 5	OKA; Ret	FUJ; 5	SEP	SUG; 12	SUZ; 17	MOT; 13	AUT; 18	FUJ; 9	19th	20
2007	JLOC	Lamborghini Gallardo RG-3	GT300	SUZ; DNQ	OKA; DNQ	FUJ; DNQ	SEP; DNQ	SUG; DNQ	SUZ; 17	MOT; 19	AUT; Ret	FUJ; 25	NC	0
2008	JLOC	Lamborghini Gallardo RG-3	GT300	SUZ; DNQ	OKA; 19	FUJ; Ret	SEP; 20	SUG; 18	SUZ; 14	MOT; 23	AUT; 21	FUJ; Ret	NC	0
2009	JLOC	Lamborghini Gallardo RG-3	GT300	OKA; 11	SUZ; Ret	FUJ; Ret	SEP; 15	SUG; 19	SUZ; 12	FUJ; 11	AUT; 17	MOT; Ret	NC	0
2010	R'Qs Motor Sports	Vemac RD350R	GT300	SUZ	OKA	FUJ	SEP	SUG	SUZ; 13	FUJ; C	MOT; 18		NC	0
2011	R'Qs Motor Sports	Vemac RD350R	GT300	OKA; 13	FUJ; 13	SEP; 16	SUG; Ret	SUZ; 19	FUJ	AUT; 14	MOT		NC	0
2012	R'Qs Motor Sports	Vemac RD350R	GT300	OKA; 16	FUJ; 12	SEP; 18	SUG; DNQ	SUZ; 12	FUJ; 16	AUT; 18	MOT		NC	0
2013	R'Qs Motor Sports	Mercedes-Benz SLS AMG GT3	GT300	OKA; Ret	FUJ; 13	SEP; Ret	SUG; 19	SUZ; 12	FUJ; 17	FSW	AUT; 14	MOT; 16	NC	0
2014	R'Qs Motor Sports	Mercedes-Benz SLS AMG GT3	GT300	OKA; 20	FUJ; 11	AUT; 17	SUG; 20	FUJ; 11	SUZ; 15	CHA; 9	MOT; 14		34th	2
2015	R'Qs Motor Sports	Mercedes-Benz SLS AMG GT3	GT300	OKA; DNS	FUJ	CHA; 15	FUJ; 10	SUZ; 16	SUG; 10	AUT; 22	MOT; 24		32nd	2
2016	R'Qs Motor Sports	Mercedes-Benz SLS AMG GT3	GT300	OKA; 19	FUJ; Ret	SUG; 20	FUJ; Ret	SUZ; 23	CHA; 18	MOT; 21	MOT; 21		NC	0
2017	R'Qs Motor Sports	Mercedes-Benz SLS AMG GT3	GT300	OKA; 24	FUJ	AUT; 26	SUG	FUJ; 26	SUZ; 21	CHA	MOT; 25		NC	0
2018	R'Qs Motor Sports	Mercedes-AMG GT3	GT300	OKA; 19	FUJ; 25	SUZ; 25	CHA	FUJ; 21	SUG; DNQ	AUT; 25	MOT; 28		NC	0
2019	R'Qs Motor Sports	Mercedes-AMG GT3	GT300	OKA; 17	FUJ; 20	SUZ; 26	CHA	FUJ; 23	AUT; Ret	SUG	MOT; 26		NC	0
2020	R'Qs Motor Sports	Mercedes-AMG GT3	GT300	FUJ; 24	FUJ; 28	SUZ; 23	MOT; Ret	FUJ	SUZ; 26	MOT; 28	FUJ; 27		NC	0
2021	R'Qs Motor Sports	Mercedes-AMG GT3 EVO 2020	GT300	OKA; 20	FUJ; Ret	SUZ; 28	MOT; 21	SUG	AUT; Ret	MOT	FUJ		NC	0
2022	R'Qs Motor Sports	Mercedes-AMG GT3 EVO 2020	GT300	OKA; 25	FUJ; Ret	SUZ	FUJ; 20	SUZ; 21	SUG; 24	AUT; 24	MOT; 22		NC	0
2023	R'Qs Motor Sports	Mercedes-AMG GT3 EVO 2020	GT300	OKA; 20	FUJ; 21	SUZ; 26	FUJ; 24	SUZ; 20	SUG; 16	AUT; 21	MOT; 22		NC	0
2024	R'Qs Motor Sports	Mercedes-AMG GT3 EVO 2020	GT300	OKA; 25	FUJ; 25	SUZ; 24	FUJ; 21	SUG; 19	AUT; 23	MOT; 20	SUZ; 23		NC	0
2025	R'Qs Motor Sports	Mercedes-AMG GT3 EVO 2020	GT300	OKA	FUJ	SEP	FS1	FS2	SUZ; 23	SUG; 17	AUT; 19	MOT; Ret	NC	0
2026	R'Qs Motor Sports	Mercedes-AMG GT3 EVO 2020	GT300	OKA; 25	FUJ	FUJ; 27	SUZ; 25	SUG; DNS	AUT; 22	MOT	MOT		NC	0

* Season still in progress.
