= JUN Auto =

JUN, or JUN Auto, is a Japanese tuning shop foundy by Junichi Tanaka. JUN started as the research facility of Tanaka Industrial Co. Ltd. Initially focused on disassembling and improving engines, JUN transitioned into manufacturing high performance car parts.

JUN produces aftermarket performance parts and engines for Japanese cars. They make parts such as piston kits, stroker kits, valves and plenums.

In 1991, JUN attended the Bonneville Speed trials at the Bonneville Salt Flats with a Z32 Nissan 300ZX that was extensively modified. JUN was able to record a speed of 422 km/h (262 mph).

JUN Auto is famous for its bright yellow "Lemon" demo cars.
