= Yoshimi Ishibashi =

Japanese race car driver

Yoshimi Ishibashi (石橋義三, Ishibashi Yoshimi; born 13 November 1949) is a professional race car driver born in Tokyo, Japan.

Ishibashi has participated in Japanese GT Series since 1994, winning the 1995 GT2 class championship. Since 1996, he has participated in the GT300 class, driving for Gaikokuya Porsche up until 2008. His last race in the GT Series was in 2010.
