= Zexel =

Japanese automotive components manufacturer

Zexel Corporation (Japanese: ゼクセル株式会社, Hepburn: Zekuseru Kabushiki Gaisha) is a former Japanese automotive components manufacturer.

== History ==
The company was founded in 1939 as Diesel Kiki Co., Ltd. (ヂーゼル機器株式会社, Jīzeru Kiki Kabushiki Gaisha) for domestic production of Bosch fuel-injection pumps for diesel engines, established with an investment from Isuzu.

Diesel Kiki began a joint venture with American company Wynns Climate Systems to begin manufacturing automotive HVAC systems circa 1987. This joint venture was initially called Wynn-Kiki before becoming Zexel USA, in line with Diesel Kiki's name change.

=== Name change ===
Diesel Kiki was renamed Zexel in 1990. The new name—a blend of "zenith" and "excellence"—was intended to reflect the company's claimed zenith as Diesel Kiki and its excellence with customer satisfaction. The company's rebranding was a two-year project involving a worldwide name search and complete marketing strategy analysis. The new logo featured red, white and blue colors, intended to represent precision, technology, and excellence. CDs were distributed to employees featuring a new company theme song.

=== Ownership changes ===
After Bosch of Germany and Valeo of France bought majority shares in Zexel, it was reorganized as Bosch Automotive Systems Corporation and Valeo Japan in 2000. The Zexel name is now a Bosch brand, but the former company's assets have primarily been split between Bosch and Valeo.

Following the Bosch takeover, a series of ownership changes resulted in the division of Zexel's major business groups: fuel injection pumps, automotive air conditioners, bus air conditioners, mobile refrigeration units, differentials, and airbags. For example, M.C. Bernardo Inc. (the exclusive representative of Diesel Kiki and Zexel in the Philippines) had to cede business to Robert Bosch Philippines, as with other Zexel partners in other countries and regions.

Valeo bought Zexel's automotive air conditioner business and refocused manufacturing towards the European market; as a result, Zexel Automotive Climate Control Systems (ZACCS) ceased operations for Isuzu, Nissan, Nissan Diesel, and Columbian Motors (a Kia assembler) in the Philippines.

Zexel's US operations were headquartered in Decatur, Illinois; the plant there mainly produced A/C compressors for Saturns. The Texas facility produced evaporator cooling unit assemblies, hook-up tubes, and condensers for manufacturers including Mazda, Subaru, Isuzu, and Volvo. The plant produced more than three thousand condensers per day and pioneered certain aspects of parallel flow condensor design and manufacturing.

Thermo King bought Zexel's bus air conditioner and refrigeration operations.

Zexel's Torsen differential operations were purchased by Toyoda Machine Works Ltd., which eventually merged with another company to form JTEKT Torsen North America.

== See also ==
- Marelli Holdings
- PIAA Corporation
