= 1995 Japanese Touring Car Championship =

Seasons
- ← 1994 1996 →

The 1995 Japanese Touring Car Championship season was the 11th edition of the series. It began at Fuji Speedway on 12 March and finished after eight events, also at Fuji Speedway on 5 November. The championship was won by Steve Soper, driving for BMW Team Schnitzer. It was his only touring car title and it would be the only time a non-Japanese driver won the series.

== Teams & Drivers ==
Team	Car	No.	Drivers	Rounds
Toyota Team TOM's	Toyota Corona EXiV	1	(Japan) Masanori Sekiya	All
Hasemi Motorsport	Nissan Primera GTe	3	(Japan) Masahiro Hasemi	All
Trans Global	BMW 318i	5	(Japan) Mutsuaki Sanada	1-6
Trans Global	BMW 318i	5	(Japan) Akira Watanabe	7
Trans Global	BMW 318i	5	(United Kingdom) Richard Dean	8
Castrol Racing	Mazda Lantis	6	(Japan) Yojiro Terada	1-2, 4-8
FET Racing	Toyota Corolla AE101	8	(Japan) Kiyoshi Misaki	1-5
FET Racing	Toyota Corolla AE110	8	(Japan) Kiyoshi Misaki	6-8
Mazdaspeed	Mazda Familia	9	(United Kingdom) Andrew Gilbert-Scott	6-8
BMW Team Schnitzer	BMW 318i	10	(United Kingdom) Steve Soper	All
Object T	Honda Civic Ferio	11	(Japan) Takahiko Hara	1
Object T	Toyota Corona T190	33	(Japan) Satoshi Motoyama	1
Object T	Toyota Corona EXiV	51	(Japan) Satoshi Motoyama	2-8
Team Impul	Nissan Primera GTe	12	(Japan) Kazuyoshi Hoshino	All
WedsSport	BMW 318i	13	(Japan) Takeo Asano	All
Mooncraft	Honda Civic Ferio	14	(Japan) Naoki Hattori	All
Nakajima Planning	Honda Civic Ferio	15	(Japan) Tetsuya Tanaka	1-3
Nakajima Planning	Honda Civic Ferio	15	(Japan) Takuya Kurosawa	4-8
Castrol Mugen Honda	Honda Civic Ferio	16	(Japan) Osamu Nakako	All
Misuzu Racing	Opel Vectra GT	17	(Japan) Tatsuhiko Kaneumi	2-4, 6-8
Club Endless	BMW 318i	18	(Japan) Mitsuhiro Kinoshita	All
Racing Project Bandoh	Toyota Sprinter Marino	19	(Japan) Katsutomo Kaneishi	1
Racing Project Bandoh	Toyota Corona EXiV	19	(Japan) Katsutomo Kaneishi	2-8
Hitotsuyama Racing	BMW 318i	20	(Japan) Mikio Hitotsuyama	8
Hitotsuyama Racing	BMW 318i	21	(Japan) Mikio Hitotsuyama	3, 5-7
Hitotsuyama Racing	BMW 318i	21	(Japan) Yasushi Hitotsuyama	1-2, 4, 8
Team Advan Yamaichi	BMW 318i	22	(Japan) Kazuo Mogi	All
Team Advan	Toyota Corolla Ceres	25	(Japan) Masami Kageyama	1, 3
Team Advan	Toyota Corona EXiV	25	(Japan) Masami Kageyama	2, 4-8
Nismo	Nissan Sunny	31	(Japan) Akira Iida	2-8
Nismo	Nissan Sunny	32	(Japan) Toshio Suzuki	2-8
AS Auto Tech	BMW 318i	35	(Japan) Akihiko Nakaya	All
Toyota Team TOM's	Toyota Corona T190	37	(Germany) Michael Krumm	1
Toyota Team TOM's	Toyota Corona EXiV	37	(Germany) Michael Krumm	2-8
Toyota Team Cerumo	Toyota Corona T190	38	(Japan) Hidetoshi Mitsusada	1
Toyota Team Cerumo	Toyota Corona EXiV	38	(Japan) Hidetoshi Mitsusada	2-8
Toyota Team Cerumo	Toyota Corona EXiV	39	(Denmark) Tom Kristensen	All
Mazdaspeed	Mazda Lantis	47	(Japan) Shogo Kobayashi	1-2, 4-8
5Zigen Racing	Honda Civic Ferio	50	(Japan) Hideki Okada	2-8
Unicorse	Alfa Romeo 155 TS	55	(Japan) Yasutaka Hinoi	4
Unicorse	Alfa Romeo 155 TS	55	(Italy) Giambattista Busi	6
Unicorse	Alfa Romeo 155 TS	55	(Italy) Giorgio Francia	8
Team Dome-Kosei	Ford Mondeo	65	(Japan) Hisashi Wada	7-8
Dandelion Racing	Toyota Corolla AE101	68	(Japan) Hideo Fukuyama	1-2, 4
Dandelion Racing	Toyota Corolla AE101	68	(Japan) Masayuki Yamamoto	3, 5-8
BMW Team Schnitzer	BMW 318i	73	(Germany) Joachim Winkelhock	1, 5-8
BMW Team Schnitzer	BMW 318i	73	(Germany) Leopold Prinz von Bayern	2-4
BMW Team Schnitzer	BMW 318i	74	(Netherlands) Peter Kox	8
Concept L Racing	Honda Civic Ferio	77	(Japan) Kazuo Shimizu	All
HKS Opel Team Japan	Opel Vectra GT	86	(United Kingdom) Justin Bell	All
HKS Opel Team Japan	Opel Vectra GT	87	(United Kingdom) Anthony Reid	1-7
HKS Opel Team Japan	Opel Vectra GT	87	(Austria) Philipp Peter	8
Team Kunimitsu	Honda Civic Ferio	100	(Japan) Keiichi Tsuchiya	2-8

== Calendar ==
Round		Circuit	Date	Pole position	Fastest lap	Winning driver	Winning team	Ref
1	R1	(Japan) Fuji Speedway, Shizuoka	12 March	(Japan) Masanori Sekiya	(Denmark) Tom Kristensen	(Denmark) Tom Kristensen	Toyota Team Cerumo	
1	R2	(Japan) Fuji Speedway, Shizuoka	12 March		(Japan) Masanori Sekiya	(Denmark) Tom Kristensen	Toyota Team Cerumo	
2	R3	(Japan) Sportsland SUGO, Miyagi	14 May	(Japan) Masanori Sekiya	(United Kingdom) Anthony Reid	(Japan) Masanori Sekiya	Toyota Team TOM's	
2	R4	(Japan) Sportsland SUGO, Miyagi	14 May		(Denmark) Tom Kristensen	(Japan) Masanori Sekiya	Toyota Team TOM's	
3	R5	(Japan) Tokachi International Speedway, Hokkaidō	11 June	(Denmark) Tom Kristensen	(Denmark) Tom Kristensen	(Denmark) Tom Kristensen	Toyota Team Cerumo	
3	R6	(Japan) Tokachi International Speedway, Hokkaidō	11 June		(Germany) Michael Krumm	(Germany) Michael Krumm	Toyota Team TOM's	
4	R7	(Japan) Suzuka Circuit, Mie	2 July	(United Kingdom) Anthony Reid	(United Kingdom) Anthony Reid	(United Kingdom) Anthony Reid	HKS Opel Team Japan	
4	R8	(Japan) Suzuka Circuit, Mie	2 July		(Japan) Kazuyoshi Hoshino	(United Kingdom) Steve Soper	BMW Team Schnitzer	
5	R9	(Japan) Mine Central Circuit, Yamaguchi	23 July	(United Kingdom) Anthony Reid	(United Kingdom) Anthony Reid	(Japan) Akira Iida	Nismo	
5	R10	(Japan) Mine Central Circuit, Yamaguchi	23 July		(Germany) Michael Krumm	(United Kingdom) Anthony Reid	HKS Opel Team Japan	
6	R11	(Japan) TI Circuit Aida, Okayama	6 August	(Denmark) Tom Kristensen	(Japan) Masanori Sekiya	(Japan) Masanori Sekiya	Toyota Team TOM's	
6	R12	(Japan) TI Circuit Aida, Okayama	6 August		(United Kingdom) Anthony Reid	(United Kingdom) Anthony Reid	HKS Opel Team Japan	
7	R13	(Japan) Sendai Hi-Land Raceway, Miyagi	8 October	(Germany) Joachim Winkelhock	(Germany) Joachim Winkelhock	(Germany) Joachim Winkelhock	BMW Team Schnitzer	
7	R14	(Japan) Sendai Hi-Land Raceway, Miyagi	8 October		(Germany) Joachim Winkelhock	(United Kingdom) Steve Soper	BMW Team Schnitzer	
8	R15	(Japan) Fuji Speedway, Shizuoka	5 November	(United Kingdom) Steve Soper	(Japan) Masanori Sekiya	(United Kingdom) Steve Soper	BMW Team Schnitzer	
8	R16	(Japan) Fuji Speedway, Shizuoka	5 November		(Japan) Masanori Sekiya	(Japan) Kazuyoshi Hoshino	Team Impul	

== Championship standings ==
Points system
**1st**	**2nd**	**3rd**	**4th**	**5th**	**6th**	**7th**	**8th**	**9th**	**10th**
15	12	9	7	6	5	4	3	2	1

- no bonus points for pole positions or fastest laps. 11 results on 16 are valid for the championship.

=== Drivers' Championship ===
Pos	Driver	FUJ		SUG		TOK		SUZ		MIN		AID		SEN		FUJ		Pts
1	(United Kingdom) Steve Soper	(10)	(5)	(4)	4	3	3	2	1	(9)	2	3	(9)	3	1	**1**	**2**	124 (142)
2	(Japan) Masanori Sekiya	**3**	2	**1**	**1**	2	4	(5)	4	22	3	1	**3**	4	11	Ret	(5)	117 (129)
3	(Japan) Kazuyoshi Hoshino	6	6	24	6	Ret	Ret	3	2	14	Ret	2	2	6	5	2	1	98
4	(United Kingdom) Anthony Reid	2	3	Ret	16	19	8	**1**	**3**	**8**	1	5	1	DSQ	DNS			87
5	(Denmark) Tom Kristensen	1	**1**	5	Ret	**1**	**12**	Ret	8	3	4	**Ret**	DSQ	18	6	Ret	4	82
6	(Japan) Akira Iida			Ret	DNS	10	7	6	Ret	1	**7**	6	4	2	3	Ret	6	67
7	(Japan) Hidetoshi Mitsusada	Ret	12	6	2	7	2	4	5	6	Ret	Ret	Ret	16	DSQ	5	20	57
8	(Germany) Michael Krumm	Ret	DNS	2	Ret	4	1	14	6	17	13	4	7	Ret	Ret	Ret	9	52
9	(Germany) Joachim Winkelhock	7	Ret							11	5	15	Ret	**1**	**2**	Ret	7	41
10	(Japan) Masami Kageyama	4	Ret	Ret	DNS	9	13	Ret	18	Ret	Ret	9	5	11	10	4	3	34
11	(United Kingdom) Justin Bell	NC	Ret	14	7	15	14	10	Ret	18	16	7	6	5	4	7	10	32
12	(Japan) Akihiko Nakaya	16	Ret	Ret	Ret	5	5	8	7	4	Ret	Ret	DNS	9	8	Ret	14	31
13	(Japan) Osamu Nakako	13	Ret	3	3	8	9	Ret	15	7	Ret	Ret	DNS	10	Ret	Ret	Ret	28
14	(Japan) Mitsuhiro Kinoshita	5	4	10	Ret	6	18	21	Ret	19	6	8	15	Ret	14	13	13	27
15	(Japan) Naoki Hattori	8	7	22	Ret	Ret	Ret	15	14	2	Ret	19	10	7	9	Ret	12	26
16	(Japan) Masahiro Hasemi	14	13	7	11	17	11	13	Ret	13	15	11	8	15	13	3	8	19
17	(Japan) Toshio Suzuki			23	Ret	11	6	7	21	Ret	Ret	21	14	8	7	NC	Ret	16
18	(Japan) Takuya Kurosawa							Ret	Ret	5	8	14	Ret	23	15	9	11	11
19	(Japan) Satoshi Motoyama	Ret	Ret	8	5	22	17	19	16	21	Ret	Ret	11	Ret	12	Ret	17	9
20	(Germany) Leopold Prinz von Bayern			9	9	13	16	9	9									8
21	(Japan) Keiichi Tsuchiya			21	Ret	23	Ret	Ret	12	23	9	13	Ret	22	Ret	6	21	7
22	(Japan) Tetsuya Tanaka	9	10	25	8	16	Ret											6
23	(Japan) Kiyoshi Misaki	11	8	12	Ret	21	20	12	11	10	Ret	16	Ret	12	16	Ret	15	4
24	(Netherlands) Peter Kox															8	Ret	3
25	(Japan) Katsutomo Kaneishi	12	9	19	Ret	12	10	20	Ret	15	Ret	12	19	13	Ret	11	27	3
26	(Japan) Hideki Okada			Ret	Ret	18	15	Ret	10	25	10	26	12	Ret	20	Ret	18	2
27	(Japan) Shogo Kobayashi	NC	14	11	10			Ret	Ret	20	11	17	20	19	Ret	21	19	1
28	(Italy) Giambattista Busi											10	13					1
29	(Austria) Philipp Peter															10	22	1
30	(Japan) Kazuo Mogi	15	18	20	DNS	14	19	11	Ret	Ret	Ret	22	Ret	17	19	Ret	24	0
31	(Japan) Takahiko Hara	Ret	11															0
32	(Japan) Kazuo Shimizu	Ret	16	13	12	DSQ	24	17	17	24	Ret	Ret	DNS	Ret	17	12	Ret	0
33	(Japan) Yojiro Terada	Ret	15	16	15			Ret	20	12	12	20	21	Ret	Ret	18	Ret	0
34	(Japan) Mutsuaki Sanada	NC	Ret	17	13	20	21	16	13	Ret	Ret	DNS	DNS					0
35	(Japan) Tatsuhiko Kaneumi			15	14	27	22	DNS	DNS			DSQ	DNS	14	18	Ret	26	0
36	(Japan) Yasushi Hitotsuyama	Ret	Ret	18	17			Ret	DNS							14	16	0
37	(Japan) Takeo Asano	Ret	17	Ret	Ret	25	25	18	Ret	16	14	25	18	DNS	DNS	NC	Ret	0
38	(United Kingdom) Richard Dean															15	23	0
39	(Japan) Masayuki Yamamoto					26	26			Ret	Ret	24	17	24	Ret	16	Ret	0
40	(United Kingdom) Andrew Gilbert-Scott											18	16	Ret	Ret	Ret	Ret	0
41	(Japan) Hisashi Wada													Ret	Ret	17	Ret	0
42	(Japan) Hideo Fukuyama	DNS	DNS	Ret	18			22	19									0
43	(Japan) Mikio Hitotsuyama					24	23			26	Ret	23	Ret	21	22	19	Ret	0
44	(Japan) Akira Watanabe													20	21			0
45	(Italy) Giorgio Francia															20	25	0
46	(Japan) Yasutaka Hinoi							23	Ret									0
Pos	Driver	FUJ		SUG		TOK		SUZ		MIN		AID		SEN		FUJ		Pts

Colour	Result
Gold	Winner
Silver	Second place
Bronze	Third place
Green	Points classification
Blue	Non-points classification
Blue	Non-classified finish (NC)
Purple	Retired, not classified (Ret)
Red	Did not qualify (DNQ)
Red	Did not pre-qualify (DNPQ)
Black	Disqualified (DSQ)
White	Did not start (DNS)
White	Withdrew (WD)
White	Race cancelled (C)
Blank	Did not practice (DNP)
Blank	Did not arrive (DNA)
Blank	Excluded (EX)

**Bold** - Pole
Italics - Fastest lap
