= 1994 Japanese Touring Car Championship =

Seasons
- ← 1993 1995 →

The 1994 Japanese Touring Car Championship season was the 10th edition of the series and the first to be run under Class II regulations. It began at Autopolis on 24 April and finished after nine events at Fuji Speedway on 30 October. The championship was won by Masanori Sekiya, driving for Toyota Team TOM's.

== Teams & Drivers ==
Team	Car	No.	Drivers	Rounds
BMW Team Schnitzer	BMW 318i	1	(Germany) Joachim Winkelhock	9
BMW Team Schnitzer	BMW 318i	73	(Germany) Joachim Winkelhock	3-4
BMW Team Schnitzer	BMW 318i	73	(Germany) Leopold Prinz von Bayern	1-2, 5-9
BMW Team Schnitzer	BMW 318i	2	(United Kingdom) Steve Soper	9
BMW Team Schnitzer	BMW 318i	10	(United Kingdom) Steve Soper	1-8
Team Taisan	BMW 318i	2	(Japan) Kazuo Mogi	1-8
Team Taisan	BMW 318i	26	(Japan) Kazuo Mogi	9
Nismo	Nissan Primera P10	3	(Japan) Masahiro Hasemi	1-7, 9
Nismo	Nissan Primera P10	12	(Japan) Kazuyoshi Hoshino	1-7, 9
Nismo	Nissan Sunny B14	31	(Japan) Akira Iida	6-9
Nismo	Nissan Sunny B14	32	(Japan) Masahiko Kageyama	6-9
Trans Global	BMW 318i	5	(Japan) Mutsuaki Sanada	9
YTR Mazdaspeed	Mazda Lantis	5	(Japan) Mutsuaki Sanada	1-4, 7
YTR Mazdaspeed	Mazda Lantis	6	(Japan) Yojiro Terada	1-2, 4-8
YTR Mazdaspeed	Mazda Lantis	9	(Japan) Yojiro Terada	9
Motorola Pagers Racing	BMW 318i	6	(United Kingdom) Justin Bell	9
Motorola Pagers Racing	BMW 318i	51	(United Kingdom) Tim Harvey	9
FET Racing	Toyota Corolla AE100	7	(Japan) Naoki Nagasaka	All
FET Racing	Toyota Corolla AE100	8	(Japan) Kiyoshi Misaki	All
Object T	Honda Civic Ferio	11	(Japan) Takahiko Hara	All
Object T	Toyota Corona T190	33	(Japan) Yasuo Muramatsu	1-5
Object T	Toyota Corona T190	33	(Germany) Michael Krumm	7-9
Mooncraft	Honda Civic Ferio	14	(Japan) Naoki Hattori	2-9
Nakajima Planning	Honda Civic Ferio	15	(Japan) Tetsuya Tanaka	All
Castrol Mugen Honda	Honda Civic Ferio	16	(Japan) Osamu Nakako	2-9
Team Advan	BMW 318i	17	(Japan) Tatsuhiko Kaneumi	2-4, 6-9
Team Advan	BMW 318i	18	(Japan) Mitsuhiro Kinoshita	2, 4-9
Racing Project Bandoh	Toyota Sprinter Marino	19	(Japan) Masahiro Matsunaga	All
Now Motor Sport	Mazda Lantis	20	(Japan) Hidetoshi Mitsusada	1
Hitotsuyama Racing	BMW 318i	21	(Japan) Yasushi Hitotsuyama	1-2, 4, 7, 9
Hitotsuyama Racing	BMW 318i	21	(Japan) Mikio Hitotsuyama	3, 5-6, 8
Hitotsuyama Racing	BMW 318i	22	(Japan) Mikio Hitotsuyama	9
Hitotsuyama Racing	BMW 318i	22	(Japan) Takayuki Kinoshita	1
Hitotsuyama Racing	BMW 318i	22	(Japan) Fuminori Mizuno	2, 4
Kondō Racing	Nissan HR33 Skyline GTS	23	(Japan) Kaoru Iida	3, 7, 9
Tsuchiya Engineering	Toyota Corolla Ceres	25	(Japan) Keiichi Suzuki	1, 3, 5, 7, 9
Tsuchiya Engineering	Toyota Corolla Ceres	25	(Japan) Morio Nitta	2, 4, 6, 8
Team Kunimitsu	Honda Civic Ferio	27	(Japan) Keiichi Tsuchiya	2, 4-9
Team Take One	BMW 318i	30	(Japan) Akihiko Nakaya	All
Auto Tech Racing	BMW 318i	35	(United Kingdom) Andrew Gilbert-Scott	All
Toyota Team TOM's	Toyota Corona T190	36	(Japan) Masanori Sekiya	All
Toyota Team TOM's	Toyota Corona T190	37	(Japan) Aguri Suzuki	1, 3-9
Toyota Team TOM's	Toyota Corona T190	37	(Japan) Masami Kageyama	2
Toyota Team Cerumo	Toyota Corona T190	38	(Japan) Takuya Kurosawa	All
Toyota Team Cerumo	Toyota Corona T190	39	(Denmark) Tom Kristensen	All
Unicorse	Alfa Romeo 155 TS	55	(Italy) Giambattista Busi	7-9
Team Gathers	Honda Civic Ferio	77	(Japan) Kazuo Shimizu	2, 4-9
Team HKS	Vauxhall Cavalier 16v	87	(United Kingdom) Anthony Reid	1-6
Team HKS	Opel Vectra GT	87	(United Kingdom) Anthony Reid	7-9
Team Doricome	Honda Civic Ferio	88	(Germany) Armin Hahne	9
Team Tanabe	Mazda Lantis	99	(Japan) Katsutomo Kaneishi	8-9

== Calendar ==
Round		Circuit	Date	Pole position	Fastest lap	Winning driver	Winning team	Ref
1	R1	(Japan) Autopolis, Ōita	24 April	(Denmark) Tom Kristensen	(United Kingdom) Anthony Reid	(United Kingdom) Anthony Reid	Team HKS	
1	R2	(Japan) Autopolis, Ōita	24 April		(United Kingdom) Anthony Reid	(United Kingdom) Anthony Reid	Team HKS	
2	R3	(Japan) Sportsland SUGO, Miyagi	15 May	(Denmark) Tom Kristensen	(Japan) Masanori Sekiya	(Denmark) Tom Kristensen	Toyota Team Cerumo	
2	R4	(Japan) Sportsland SUGO, Miyagi	15 May		(Denmark) Tom Kristensen	(United Kingdom) Steve Soper	BMW Team Schnitzer	
3	R5	(Japan) Tokachi International Speedway, Hokkaidō	19 June	(Japan) Aguri Suzuki	(Japan) Aguri Suzuki	(United Kingdom) Anthony Reid	Team HKS	
3	R6	(Japan) Tokachi International Speedway, Hokkaidō	19 June		(United Kingdom) Steve Soper	(Japan) Masanori Sekiya	Toyota Team TOM's	
4	R7	(Japan) Suzuka Circuit, Mie	3 July	(United Kingdom) Steve Soper	(Denmark) Tom Kristensen	(Denmark) Tom Kristensen	Toyota Team Cerumo	
4	R8	(Japan) Suzuka Circuit, Mie	3 July		(Denmark) Tom Kristensen	(Denmark) Tom Kristensen	Toyota Team Cerumo	
5	R9	(Japan) Mine Central Circuit, Yamaguchi	17 July	(Denmark) Tom Kristensen	(Japan) Kazuyoshi Hoshino	(United Kingdom) Steve Soper	BMW Team Schnitzer	
5	R10	(Japan) Mine Central Circuit, Yamaguchi	17 July		(Japan) Kazuyoshi Hoshino	(United Kingdom) Steve Soper	BMW Team Schnitzer	
6	R11	(Japan) TI Circuit Aida, Okayama	7 August	(United Kingdom) Anthony Reid	(Denmark) Tom Kristensen	(Denmark) Tom Kristensen	Toyota Team Cerumo	
6	R12	(Japan) TI Circuit Aida, Okayama	7 August		(Denmark) Tom Kristensen	(Denmark) Tom Kristensen	Toyota Team Cerumo	
7	R13	(Japan) Tsukuba Circuit, Ibaraki	21 August	(United Kingdom) Steve Soper	(Japan) Naoki Hattori	(Japan) Masanori Sekiya	Toyota Team TOM's	
7	R14	(Japan) Tsukuba Circuit, Ibaraki	21 August		(Japan) Tetsuya Tanaka	(Japan) Masanori Sekiya	Toyota Team TOM's	
8	R15	(Japan) Sendai Hi-Land Raceway, Miyagi	25 September	(Denmark) Tom Kristensen	(United Kingdom) Steve Soper	(United Kingdom) Steve Soper	BMW Team Schnitzer	
8	R16	(Japan) Sendai Hi-Land Raceway, Miyagi	25 September		(Denmark) Tom Kristensen	(United Kingdom) Steve Soper	BMW Team Schnitzer	
9	R17	(Japan) Fuji Speedway, Shizuoka	30 October	(Japan) Kazuyoshi Hoshino	(Denmark) Tom Kristensen	(Japan) Kazuyoshi Hoshino	Nissan Motorsport	
9	R18	(Japan) Fuji Speedway, Shizuoka	30 October		(United Kingdom) Anthony Reid	(United Kingdom) Anthony Reid	Team HKS	

Round 18 was also part of the 1994 Asia-Pacific Touring Car Championship calendar.

== Championship Standings ==
Points were awarded 15, 12, 9, 7, 6, 5, 4, 3, 2, 1 to the top 10 finishers in each race, with no bonus points for pole positions or fastest laps. Drivers counted their 13 best scores.

Pos	Driver	AUT		SUG		TOK		SUZ		MIN		AID		TSU		SEN		FUJ		Pts
1	(Japan) Masanori Sekiya	2	3	17	Ret	2	1	4	3	Ret	2	Ret	5	1	**1**	6	3	6	3	135
2	(Denmark) Tom Kristensen	**5**	6	**1**	**12**	4	7	1	**1**	**2**	DNS	1	**1**	NC	5	**2**	5	24	6	134
3	(United Kingdom) Steve Soper	Ret	7	3	1	6	9	**2**	2	1	**1**	9	3	**Ret**	DNS	1	**1**	Ret	7	132
4	(United Kingdom) Anthony Reid	1	**1**	Ret	DNS	1	**3**	12	5	7	8	**Ret**	7	5	Ret	9	Ret	2	1	106
5	(Japan) Aguri Suzuki	9	5			**3**	2	5	4	Ret	3	2	2	3	DNS	3	Ret	5	8	102
6	(Japan) Masahiro Hasemi	4	2	4	2	9	8	6	8	5	Ret	5	Ret	Ret	DNS			4	5	76
7	(Japan) Naoki Hattori			9	11	10	6	8	7	3	10	3	4	Ret	Ret	4	2	7	12	64
8	(Japan) Kazuyoshi Hoshino	3	Ret	Ret	3	7	Ret	3	20	16	Ret	4	Ret	Ret	DNS			**1**	**Ret**	53
9	(United Kingdom) Andrew Gilbert-Scott	7	4	5	Ret	Ret	11	11	10	9	6	8	Ret	6	12	16	15	Ret	Ret	33
10	(Germany) Joachim Winkelhock					8	4	Ret	Ret									3	2	31
11	(Japan) Osamu Nakako			Ret	6	12	Ret	16	Ret	4	7	12	17	10	Ret	5	6	26	13	28
12	(Japan) Keiichi Suzuki	6	8			5	5			Ret	4			Ret	DNS			DNS	DNS	27
13	(Japan) Akira Iida											14	13	4	2	8	Ret	12	10	24
14	(Japan) Tetsuya Tanaka	Ret	12	Ret	DNS	Ret	Ret	10	9	6	Ret	18	DNS	2	Ret	11	7	DNS	14	24
15	(Germany) Leopold Prinz von Bayern	10	9	7	7					Ret	DNS	10	6	15	DNS	7	8	DNS	DNS	24
16	(Japan) Keiichi Tsuchiya			8	4			17	16	Ret	Ret	16	11	8	4	13	11	13	Ret	20
17	(Japan) Naoki Nagasaka	Ret	10	6	16	11	10	7	6	Ret	DNS	7	Ret	Ret	DNS	Ret	Ret	11	11	20
18	(Japan) Takuya Kurosawa	8	DNS	Ret	DNS	DNS	Ret	9	Ret	8	Ret	Ret	Ret	Ret	6	Ret	10	9	9	18
19	(Japan) Kiyoshi Misaki	13	17	Ret	9	15	Ret	Ret	11	Ret	DNS	6	Ret	NC	11	20	16	8	4	17
20	(Japan) Akihiko Nakaya	11	Ret	10	Ret	13	12	Ret	21	10	5	Ret	8	12	Ret	10	9	Ret	23	14
21	(Japan) Masami Kageyama			2	Ret															12
22	(Japan) Masahiko Kageyama											21	10	Ret	3	Ret	DNS	14	18	10
23	(Italy) Giambattista Busi													DNQ	DNQ	14	4	10	27	8
24	(Germany) Michael Krumm													7	7	Ret	DNS	27	22	8
25	(Japan) Yojiro Terada	18	15	15	8			20	17	14	9	17	15	17	9	21	21	DNS	DNS	7
26	(Japan) Fuminori Mizuno			12	5			15	15											6
27	(Japan) Masahiro Matsunaga	16	11	13	13	14	Ret	19	Ret	Ret	DNS	13	9	9	10	17	20	DNS	DNS	5
28	(Japan) Kazuo Mogi	12	18	Ret	DNS	DNS	Ret	14	12	15	Ret	11	Ret	11	8	Ret	DNS	DNS	NC	3
29	(Japan) Takahiko Hara	19	14	16	10	16	15	13	13	11	12	15	16	Ret	DNS	15	12	15	17	1
30	(Japan) Mutsuaki Sanada	14	Ret	11	Ret	17	13	Ret	Ret					DNQ	DNQ			19	21	0
31	(Japan) Mikio Hitotsuyama					18	14			17	11	19	14			22	19	22	26	0
32	(Japan) Kazuo Shimizu			14	15			Ret	Ret	Ret	DNS	Ret	12	13	Ret	18	18	16	20	0
33	(Japan) Morio Nitta			Ret	DNS			23	Ret			Ret	DNS			12	13			0
34	(Japan) Yasuo Muramatsu	NC	Ret	Ret	DNS	Ret	Ret	Ret	DNS	12	Ret									0
35	(Japan) Mitsuhiro Kinoshita			NC	Ret			18	14	13	Ret	Ret	DNS	14	Ret	Ret	14	25	DSQ	0
36	(Japan) Tatsuhiko Kaneumi			NC	14	Ret	Ret	22	19			20	Ret	16	13	23	Ret	Ret	25	0
37	(Japan) Takayuki Kinoshita	15	13																	0
38	(Germany) Armin Hahne																	21	15	0
39	(Japan) Yasushi Hitotsuyama	17	16	Ret	Ret			21	18					Ret	DNS			DNS	24	0
40	(United Kingdom) Tim Harvey																	17	16	0
41	(Japan) Katsutomo Kaneishi															19	17	18	19	0
42	(United Kingdom) Justin Bell																	20	Ret	0
43	(Japan) Kaoru Iida					Ret	Ret							Ret	DNS			23	28	0
NC	(Japan) Hidetoshi Mitsusada	DNS	DNS																	0
Pos	Driver	AUT		SUG		TOK		SUZ		MIN		AID		TSU		SEN		FUJ		Pts

Colour	Result
Gold	Winner
Silver	Second place
Bronze	Third place
Green	Points classification
Blue	Non-points classification
Blue	Non-classified finish (NC)
Purple	Retired, not classified (Ret)
Red	Did not qualify (DNQ)
Red	Did not pre-qualify (DNPQ)
Black	Disqualified (DSQ)
White	Did not start (DNS)
White	Withdrew (WD)
White	Race cancelled (C)
Blank	Did not practice (DNP)
Blank	Did not arrive (DNA)
Blank	Excluded (EX)

**Bold** - Pole
Italics - Fastest lap
