= Keiichi Tsuchiya =

Japanese racing driver (born 1956)

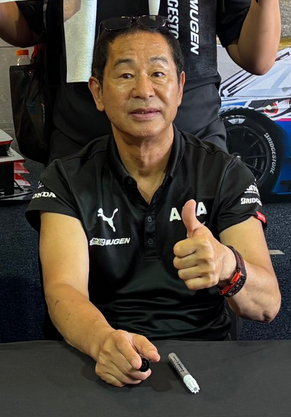
- Tsuchiya at Super GT Malaysia Round in 2025
- Born: January 30, 1956 (age 70) Tōmi, Nagano, Japan
- Nationality: Japanese

24 Hours of Le Mans career
- Years: 1994–2000
- Teams: Team Kunimitsu Honda, Team Lark McLaren, Toyota Team Europe, TV Asahi Team Dragon
- Best finish: 2nd (1999)
- Class wins: 2 (1995, 1999)

Keiichi Tsuchiya (土屋圭市, Tsuchiya Keiichi; born January 30, 1956) is a Japanese professional race car driver. He is known as the Drift King (ドリキン, Dorikin) for his nontraditional use of drifting in non-drifting racing events and his role in popularizing drifting as a motorsport. In professional racing, he is a two-time 24 Hours of Le Mans class winner and the 2001 All Japan GT Championship runner-up. He is also known for tōge driving.

The car Tsuchiya drives, a Toyota AE86 Sprinter Trueno, has become one of the most popular sports cars; the car is also known as "Hachi-Roku" in Japan (hachi-roku meaning "eight-six"); his car is also called "The Little Hachi that could." A 2-part video known as 'The Touge' produced by Pluspy (styled as +P) documents Tsuchiya's touge driving with his AE86.

Tsuchiya was a consultant for the popular manga and anime series, Initial D, in which he makes several cameos. He also served as a stunt coordinator and stuntman on The Fast and the Furious: Tokyo Drift, where he also made a cameo appearance.

== Biography ==
Tsuchiya started his career as a racing driver and became widely known after appearing in illegal street racing videos produced by Pluspy. He rose to international prominence by popularizing the art of oversteer through the Fuji Freshman series in 1977. Unlike many drivers who came from wealthy families or motorsport backgrounds, he honed his skills from street racing and became a prominent figure in the underground scene and in global events such as the WTAC in Sydney.

=== Racing career ===
National championships

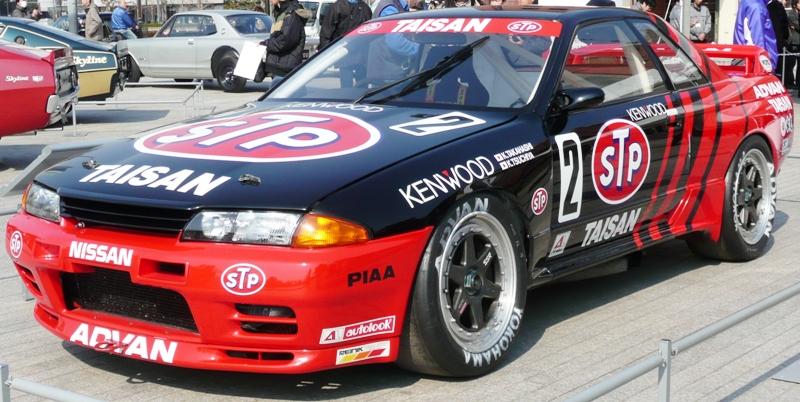
Nissan Skyline GT-R (1992)

Tsuchiya would continue to take part in the Japanese Formula Three Championship, Japanese Touring Car Championship (JTCC), the latter while driving a Cosmo Oil Sierra Cosworth and Nissan Skyline GT-R (Team Taisan) in the Group A championships and later a Honda Civic in the Supertouring car championships.

Le Mans

Tsuchiya went on to score a class win and an eighth place overall at the 1995 24 Hours of Le Mans in a Honda NSX. In the same race in 1999, this time in a Toyota GT-One, during the last hour while co-driver Ukyo Katayama was building up pace to the leading BMW V12 LMR he was forced into the grass by a backmarker privateer's BMW V12 LM, blowing the tire out. They survived the ordeal and went on to score the fastest lap but were forced to settle for second.

NASCAR

Tsuchiya has raced in NASCAR-sanctioned exhibition races at Suzuka Circuit (Suzuka Thunder 100) and at Twin Ring Motegi Superspeedway, as well as in the Winston West Series at California Speedway in 1998 and at Twin Ring Motegi in the 1999 NASCAR Coca-Cola 500, which was the season finale for the series and NASCAR's first points paying race held outside North America.

=== Drifting career ===
When Tsuchiya was a freshman in circuit racing, he was about to get his racing license suspended because of the illegal racing he was recording for Pluspy. In the movie series Shuto Kousoku Trial, he advised street racers to leave the illegal racing scene if they want to become involved with professional racing.

=== After retirement ===
After his retirement, Tsuchiya was Team Director for both GT500 for one year and GT300 Class of ARTA JGTC Team until the team disbanded their GT300 operation at the end of the 2005 season. He owned the aftermarket company Kei Office until he sold the business in the end of 2005 to form DG-5. After quitting D1 in January 2011, he co-founded amateur drifting series Drift Muscle, where he also worked as judge.

Tsuchiya's trademark color is jade green, which appears on his overalls and helmet and is the adopted color of the former company. It was also the colour of the D1 Grand Prix Kei Office and DG-5 S15 Silvia of driver and employee Yasuyuki Kazama who also wears a suit similar in pattern.

Tsuchiya also hosts the video magazine "Best Motoring" which features road tests of new Japanese cars including a special section called "Hot Version" which focuses on performance-modified cars. He is a guest presenter in Video Option alongside fellow racing drivers Manabu Orido and Nobuteru Taniguchi, a monthly video magazine, similar to Hot Version except regularly covers the D1GP and its sister video magazine Drift Tengoku which deals purely with drifting.

Tsuchiya has been an editorial supervisor on the televised anime Initial D and Wangan Midnight. He also appeared in the semi biographical film Shuto Kousoku Trial 2, 3, 4, 5, and 6 was also featured in the Super GT magazine show in Japan. His life in driving is parallel to that of the Initial D main character, Takumi, as both of them started exploring their local touge while doing regular deliveries for their family businesses. He makes a number of cameos in the series: in the First Stage, he briefly converses with Takumi's father, Bunta; in the Third Stage, a motorcycle rider wearing a similar racing suit overtakes Takumi as he was en route to an invitation battle with Ryosuke Takahashi; and in the Final Stage, he meets Takumi in person while the latter spectates a circuit race in the end credits. The color of Tomo's racing suit from the Initial D 4th Stage is jade green and has a similar pattern to Tsuchiya's suit. He also made an appearance opposite Top Gear's Jeremy Clarkson in a Motorworld in Japan special showing drifting competition in the mid-1990s in Japan.

After 1995, Tsuchiya sometimes appeared as a Formula One guest commentator in Japanese Fuji TV.

In 2003, Tsuchiya released "Drift Bible: A Complete Guide to Drifting" where he explains how to perform the six core drifting methods (E-brake, shift lock, power over, braking, feint, and lift-off—explaining) effectively, and how to set up and tune a car for both drifting and competitive drift racing.

In 2006, Tsuchiya made a cameo as a fisherman in the movie The Fast and the Furious: Tokyo Drift in which he served as a stuntman.

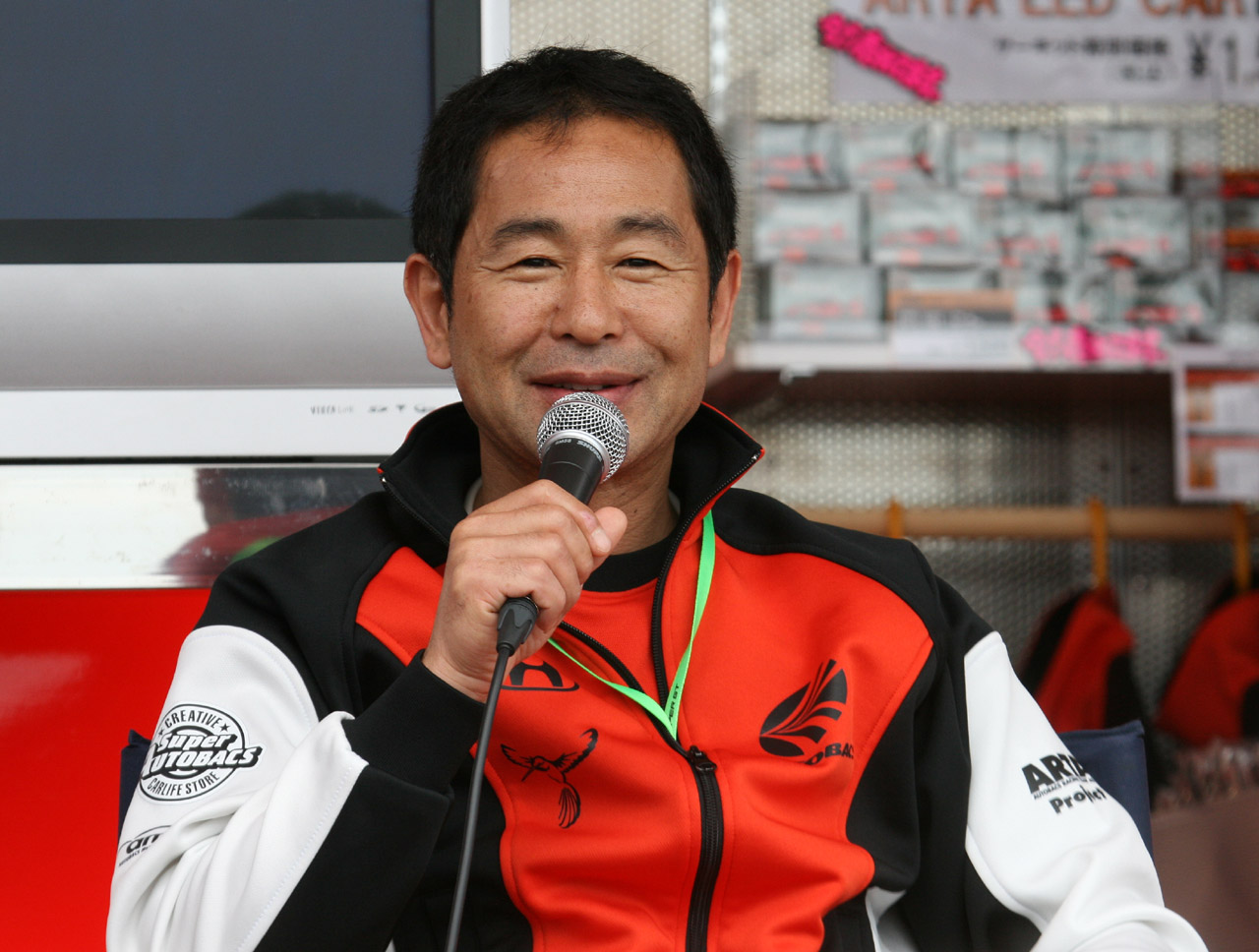
In 2008, as Executive Advisor of ARTA

In 2014, Tsuchiya announced a joint venture with the King of Europe Drift ProSeries in order to create the King of Asia ProSeries. He would also act as one of the main judges for several important races in the King of Europe ProSeries, being called in as a guest representative throughout the years.

== Career summary ==
- 1977: Debut in Fuji Freshman series.
- 1981–1984: Ran selected entries in All Japan Touring Car championship.
- 1984: Fuji Freshman series race (Toyota AE86) – 6 wins
- 1985: All Japan Touring Car championship (Toyota AE86) 1st in Class 3
- 1986: Corolla Sprinter Cup – 2 podium places
- 1987: All Japan Touring Car championship (Honda Civic) – 1 win
- 1988: Toyota Cup – 1st overall
  - All Japan Touring Car championship (BMW E30) – 3rd in Class 2
- Macau Guia race (BMW M3) – 4th overall
- 1989: All Japan F3 championship
  - All Japan Touring Car championship (Ford Sierra Cosworth) – 1 win
- 1990: All Japan Touring Car championship (Ford Sierra Cosworth)
  - Macau Guia race (Ford Sierra Cosworth)
  - New Zealand Touring Car series (Toyota)
- 1991: All Japan F3 championship (Ralt-Mugen) – 10th overall
  - All Japan Touring Car championship (Nissan Skyline GT-R) – 5th overall
- 1992: All Japan Touring Car championship (Nissan Skyline GT-R)
- 1993: All Japan Touring Car championship (Taisan Nissan Skyline GT-R) – 1 win
  - Japan Endurance series (Honda Prelude) – 2nd Tsukuba 12 Hours
- 1994: All Japan GT championship (Porsche 911T) – 1 win
  - All Japan Touring Car championship (Honda Civic)
  - Suzuka 1000 km (Porsche 911T) – 1st in class, 2nd overall
  - Le Mans 24 Hours (Honda NSX) – 18th overall
- 1995: All Japan GT championship (Porsche911TRSR)
  - All Japan Touring Car championship (Honda Civic)
  - Suzuka 1000 km (Honda NSX) – 5th overall
  - Tokachi 12 Hours (Honda NSX) – 1st overall
  - Le Mans 24 Hours (Honda NSX) – 1st in class
- 1996: All Japan GT championship (Honda NSX) -13th overall
  - Entered NASCAR Thunder Special race at Suzuka
  - Le Mans 24 Hours (Honda NSX) – 3rd in class
- 1997: All Japan GT championship (Porsche 911/Dodge Viper)
  - Fuji InterTec race (Toyota Chaser)
  - Suzuka 1000 km (Lark McLaren F1 GTR) – 9th overall
  - Entered NASCAR Thunder Special race at Suzuka
  - Le Mans 24 Hours (Lark McLaren F1 GTR) – qualified 10th, retired from race
- 1998: All Japan Touring Car championship (Toyota Chaser) – 7th overall
  - All Japan GT championship (Toyota Supra) – 8th overall
  - Le Mans 24 Hours (Toyota GT-One) –9th overall
  - NASCAR at the California Speedway.
- 1999: Le Mans 24 Hours (Toyota GT-One) – 2nd overall
- 2000: Le Mans 24 Hours (Panoz LMP-1 Roadster-S) – 8th overall
- 2000–2003: Joined Team ARTA, racing an NSX once again in the All Japan GT championship.
- 2004–2005: Studied in Australia to complete inter-2 course.

== Racing record ==
=== Complete Japanese Touring Car Championship (–1993) results ===
Year	Team	Car	Class	1	2	3	4	5	6	7	8	9	DC	Pts
1991	Team Taisan	Nissan Skyline GT-R	JTC-1	SUG; Ret	SUZ; 2	TSU; 2	SEN; 3	AUT; 4	FUJ; 3				5th	128
1992	Team Taisan	Nissan Skyline GT-R	JTC-1	AID; 4	AUT; Ret	SUG; 3	SUZ; 3	MIN; 17	TSU; 2	SEN; 4	FUJ; 17		9th	74
1993	Team Taisan	Nissan Skyline GT-R	JTC-1	MIN; Ret	AUT; 1	SUG; Ret	SUZ; 2	AID; 5	TSU; 4	TOK; 6	SEN; Ret	FUJ; Ret	11th	59

=== Complete Japanese Touring Car Championship (1994–) results ===
Year	Team	Car	1	2	3	4	5	6	7	8	9	10	11	12	13	14	15	16	17	18	DC	pts
1994	Team Kunimitsu	Honda Civic Ferio	AUT; 1	AUT; 2	SUG; 1; 8	SUG; 2; 4	TOK; 1	TOK; 2	SUZ; 1; 17	SUZ; 2; 16	MIN; 1 Ret	MIN; 2 Ret	AID; 1; 16	AID; 2; 11	TSU; 1; 8	TSU; 2; 4	SEN; 1; 13	SEN; 2; 11	FUJ; 1; 13	FUJ; 2 Ret	16th	20
1995	Team Kunimitsu	Honda Civic Ferio	FUJ; 1	FUJ; 2	SUG; 1; 21	SUG; 2 Ret	TOK; 1; 23	TOK; 2 Ret	SUZ; 1 Ret	SUZ; 2; 12	MIN; 1; 23	MIN; 2; 9	AID; 1; 13	AID; 2 Ret	SEN; 1; 22	SEN; 2 Ret	FUJ; 1; 6	FUJ; 2; 21			21st	7
1997	Tsuchiya Engineering	Toyota Chaser	FUJ; 1	FUJ; 2	AID; 1	AID; 2	SUG; 1	SUG; 2	SUZ; 1	SUZ; 2	MIN; 1	MIN; 2	SEN; 1	SEN; 2	TOK; 1	TOK; 2	FUJ; 1; 14	FUJ; 2; 10			23rd	1
1998	Tsuchiya Engineering	Toyota Chaser	FUJ; 1; 3	FUJ; 2; 8	MOT; 7	SUG; 1; 5	SUG; 2; 6	SUZ; 1 Ret	SUZ; 2; 4	MIN; 1; 8	MIN; 2; 5	AID; 4	FUJ; 3								7th	63

=== Complete JGTC results ===
(key) (Races in bold indicate pole position) (Races in italics indicate fastest lap)

Year	Team	Car	Class	Rd.1	Rd.2	Rd.3	Rd.4	Rd.5	Rd.6	Rd.7	Rd.8	Rd.9	DC	Pts
1994	Team Kunimitsu	Porsche 911	GT1	FUJ	SEN	FUJ; Ret	SUG; 1	MIN; 2					7th	35
1995	Team Kunimitsu	Porsche 911	GT1	SUZ; 14	FUJ; 3	SEN; 4	FUJ; 8	SUG; 8	MIN; Ret				10th	28
1996	Team Kunimitsu	Honda NSX	GT500	SUZ; Ret	FUJ; 8	SEN; 12	FUJ; 7	SUG; 10	MIN; 11				17th	8
1997	Team Taisan with Advan	Dodge Viper GTS-R	GT500	SUZ	FUJ	SEN; 10	FUJ; Ret	MIN; 14	SUG; 8				23rd	6
1998	TOYOTA TEAM SARD	Toyota Supra	GT500	SUZ; 3	FUJ; C	SEN; 4	FUJ; 9	MOT; Ret	MIN; 3	SUG; Ret			6th	36
1999	TOYOTA TEAM SARD	Toyota Supra	GT500	SUZ; 16	FUJ; 15	SUG; Ret	MIN; 7	FUJ; 10	TAI; 13	MOT; Ret			22nd	5
2000	Autobacs Racing Team Aguri	Honda NSX	GT500	MOT; 7	FUJ; Ret	SUG; 15	FUJ; 1	TAI; Ret	MIN; Ret	SUZ; DSQ			13th	24
2001	Autobacs Racing Team Aguri	Honda NSX	GT500	TAI; 2	FUJ; 6	SUG; 2	FUJ; 12	MOT; 11	**SUZ**; 1	MIN; Ret			2nd	56
2002	Autobacs Racing Team Aguri	Honda NSX	GT500	TAI; 7	FUJ; 4	**SUG**; 13	SEP; 6	FUJ; 9	MOT; 8	MIN; 8	SUZ; 2		10th	46
2003	Autobacs Racing Team Aguri	Honda NSX	GT500	TAI; 11	FUJ; Ret	SUG; 11	FUJ; 11	FUJ; 12	MOT; 8	AUT; Ret	SUZ; 6		19th	9

=== Complete 24 Hours of Le Mans results ===
Year	Team	Co-Drivers	Car	Class	Laps	Pos.	Class Pos.
1994	(Germany) Kremer Honda Racing (Japan) Team Kunimitsu	(Japan) Kunimitsu Takahashi (Japan) Akira Iida	Honda NSX	GT2	222	18th	9th
1995	(Japan) Team Kunimitsu Honda	(Japan) Kunimitsu Takahashi (Japan) Akira Iida	Honda NSX	GT2	275	8th	**1st**
1996	(Japan) Team Kunimitsu Honda	(Japan) Kunimitsu Takahashi (Japan) Akira Iida	Honda NSX	GT2	305	16th	**3rd**
1997	(Japan) Team Lark McLaren (United Kingdom) Parabolica Motorsports	(Japan) Akihiko Nakaya (United Kingdom) Gary Ayles	McLaren F1 GTR	GT1	88	DNF	DNF
1998	(Japan) Toyota Motorsports (Germany) Toyota Team Europe	(Japan) Ukyo Katayama (Japan) Toshio Suzuki	Toyota GT-One	GT1	326	9th	8th
1999	(Japan) Toyota Motorsports (Germany) Toyota Team Europe	(Japan) Ukyo Katayama (Japan) Toshio Suzuki	Toyota GT-One	LMGTP	364	**2nd**	**1st**
2000	(Japan) TV Asahi Team Dragon	(Japan) Akira Iida (Japan) Masahiko Kondo	Panoz LMP-1 Roadster-S	LMP900	330	8th	7th
