= Giambattista Busi =

Former Italian racing driver (born 1968)

Giambattista Busi (born 21 April 1968) is an Italian former racing driver who most recently competed in the 1996 Spanish Supertouring Championship season, with other appearances at the Italian Superturismo Championship in 1996 for Motortrend, the Japanese Touring Car Championship in 1994 and 1995 for Unicorse and International Formula 3000 in 1992 for Piemme Motors.

== Racing career ==
=== Formula 3 (1998-1991) ===
Busi began his Italian Formula 3 career with the Trivalleto Racing Team in 1988, before moving to Benecchi Corse in 1989 and Piemme Motors in 1991 (although he did have an outing with the team in 1990 at the Monaco F3 race, but he did not qualify). His career with the team was very successful, getting two wins and five podiums and winning the championship, beating rival and eventual Formula One driver Domenico Schiattarella. He also made appearances at the 1991 Monaco F3 race, placing seventh, and the 1991 Macau Grand Prix, not finishing the race.

=== International Formula 3000 (1992) ===
With this success in Formula 3, Busi decided to attempt International Formula 3000 for 1992 with Piemme Motors, although this did not turn out well for him. That season, he did not finish a single race, ending up not being classified in the standings. After this attempt, he did not return to open-wheel racing and focused on touring cars.

=== Japanese Touring Car Championship (1994-1995) ===
After taking a break in 1993, Busi returned to racing with the Unicorse team in 1994, driving an Alfa Romeo 155 under the newly adopted Super Touring regulations. Despite only competing in the last six rounds and only qualifying for four of them, he managed to get eight points with a fourth-place finish at the Sendai Hi-Land Raceway during Round 16 of the championship. For 1995, he stayed with the Unicorse team but only competed in two rounds, both held at the TI Circuit Aida, placing tenth and 13th respectively.

=== Italian Superturismo Championship (1996) ===
In 1996, Busi returned to Italy, competing in the Italian Superturismo Championship with a Peugeot 405 into the Motortrend team for three rounds. His only race finish that year also happened to be the race he scored his only point, with a ninth place at the Mugello Circuit.

=== Spanish Supertouring Championship (1996) ===
Also in 1996, Busi raced an Opel Vectra GT in the Spanish Superturismo Championship for the last round, only finishing one race in 16th.

== Racing record ==
=== Career summary ===
Season	Series	Team Name	Races	Wins	Poles	Points	Position
1988	Italian Formula 3	Trivalleto Racing Team	6	0	0	0	?
1989	Italian Formula 3	Benecchi Corse	9	0	0	0	?
1990	Monaco Grand Prix F3	Piemme Motors	1	0	0	0	DNQ
1991	Italian Formula 3	Piemme Motors	12	2	?	44	1st
1991	1991 Monaco Grand Prix Formula Three	Piemme Motors	1	0	0	0	7th
1991	Macau Grand Prix	Volkswagen Motorsport	1	0	0	0	DNF
1991	Formula 3 Fuji Cup	Volkswagen Motorsport	1	0	0	0	DNQ
1992	International Formula 3000	Piemme Motors	8	0	0	0	NC
1994	Japanese Touring Car Championship	Unicorse	6	0	0	8	23rd
1995	Japanese Touring Car Championship	Unicorse	2	0	0	1	27th
1996	Italian Superturismo Championship	Motortrend	6	0	0	2	25th
1996	Spanish Supertouring Championship	Giambattista Busi	2	0	0	0	?

=== Complete International Formula 3000 results ===
(key) (Races in bold indicate pole position) (Races in italics indicate fastest lap)

Year	Entrant	Chassis	Engine	1	2	3	4	5	6	7	8	9	10	DC	Points
1992	Piemme Motors	Ralt RT24	Cosworth	SIL; Ret	PAU	CAT	PER; Ret	HOC; Ret	NÜR; Ret	SPA; Ret	ALB; Ret	NOG; DNS	MAG; Ret	NC	0
