= Akira Iida =

Japanese racing driver

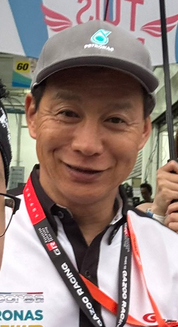
- Iida at Super GT Malaysia Round in 2025
- Nationality: (Japan) Japanese
- Born: December 18, 1969 (age 56); Sagamihara, Kanagawa

24 Hours of Le Mans career
- Years: 1994-1996, 2000
- Teams: Team Kunimitsu Honda, TV Asahi Team Dragon
- Best finish: 8th (1995, 2000)
- Class wins: 1 (1995)

Akira Iida (Shinjitai: 飯田 章, Iida Akira; born 18 December 1969 in Sagamihara, Kanagawa) is a Japanese racing driver currently competing in the Super GT series. He won the 2002 All Japan Grand Touring Car Championship GT500 title with Esso Toyota Team LeMans, co-driving with Juichi Wakisaka. He also won the 2013 Asian Le Mans Series GTE class title for Team Taisan Ken Endless.

Iida was also a presenter on the Japanese performance-car program Best Motoring.

== Career ==
Iida has competed in Super GT (formerly JGTC) since 1994; he has multiple race wins and captured the drivers’ title in 2002 with Wakisaka for Esso Team LeMans. He has also raced in International Formula 3000 and Formula Nippon.

Being experienced at the 24 Hours of Le Mans, Iida also participated in the 24 Hours of Nürburgring and VLN endurance races, including class wins in a Lexus LFA. On 31 August 2011, Iida recorded a lap time of 7:14.64 in a fully road-legal Lexus LFA Nürburgring Package around the Nürburgring Nordschleife, then a production-car benchmark on standard specification tyres, confirmed by Lexus.

== Racing record ==
=== 24 Hours of Le Mans ===
The following results are summarized from RacingSportsCars and event archives.

Year	Team	Co-Drivers	Car	Class	Laps	Pos.	Class Pos.
1994	(Germany) Kremer Honda Racing (Japan) Team Kunimitsu	(Japan) Kunimitsu Takahashi (Japan) Keiichi Tsuchiya	Honda NSX	GT2	222	18th	9th
1995	(Japan) Team Kunimitsu Honda	(Japan) Kunimitsu Takahashi (Japan) Keiichi Tsuchiya	Honda NSX	GT2	275	8th	**1st**
1996	(Japan) Team Kunimitsu Honda	(Japan) Kunimitsu Takahashi (Japan) Keiichi Tsuchiya	Honda NSX	GT2	305	16th	**3rd**
2000	(Japan) TV Asahi Team Dragon	(Japan) Keiichi Tsuchiya (Japan) Masahiko Kondō	Panoz LMP-1 Roadster-S-Élan	LMP900	330	8th	7th
2002	(Japan) Team Taisan Advan	(Japan) Atsushi Yogo (Japan) Kazuyuki Nishizawa	Porsche 911 GT3-RS	GT	316	21st	**3rd**
2003	(Japan) Team Taisan Advan	(Japan) Atsushi Yogo (Japan) Kazuyuki Nishizawa	Porsche 911 GT3-RS	GT	304	19th	4th

=== Complete JTC/JTCC results ===
Year	Team	Car	Class	1	2	3	4	5	6	7	8	9	10	11	12	13	14	15	16	17	18	DC	Pts
1993	NISMO	Nissan Skyline GT-R	JTC-1	MIN; 14	AUT; 5	SUG; 3	SUZ; 5	AID; 2	TSU; 1	TOK; 2	SEN; 18	FUJ; 3										4th	119
1994	NISMO	Nissan Sunny		AUT; 1	AUT; 2	SUG; 1	SUG; 2	TOK; 1	TOK; 2	SUZ; 1	SUZ; 2	MIN; 1	MIN; 2	AID; 1; 14	AID; 2; 13	TSU; 1; 4	TSU; 2; 2	SEN; 1; 8	SEN; 2 Ret	FUJ; 1; 12	FUJ; 2; 10	13th	24
1995	NISMO	Nissan Sunny		FUJ; 1	FUJ; 2	SUG; 1 Ret	SUG; 2 DNS	TOK; 1; 10	TOK; 2; 7	SUZ; 1; 6	SUZ; 2 Ret	MIN; 1; 1	MIN; 2; 7	AID; 1; 6	AID; 2; 4	SEN; 1; 2	SEN; 2; 3	FUJ; 1 Ret	FUJ; 2; 6			6th	67
1997	HKS Opel Team Japan	Opel Vectra		FUJ; 1 C	FUJ; 2 C	AID; 1; 10	AID; 2 Ret	SUG; 1; 4	SUG; 2; 5	SUZ; 1; 6	SUZ; 2 Ret	MIN; 1 Ret	MIN; 2 DNS	SEN; 1; 3	SEN; 2; 1	TOK; 1; 12	TOK; 2 DNS	FUJ; 1; 13	FUJ; 2 Ret			8th	43

=== Japanese Top Formula Championship results ===
Year	Entrant	1	2	3	4	5	6	7	8	9	10	DC	Points
1995	Shionogi Team Nova	SUZ; Ret	FUJ; C	MIN; Ret	SUZ	SUG; 8	FUJ; 11	TOK; Ret	FUJ; 11	SUZ; 11		NC	0
1997	Shionogi Team Nova	SUZ; 6	MIN; 3	FUJ; Ret	SUZ; 7	SUG; Ret	FUJ; 5	MIN; 10	MOT; 11	FUJ; Ret	SUZ; 13	10th	7
1998	Cosmo Oil Racing Team Cerumo	SUZ	MIN	FUJ; 8	MOT; Ret	SUZ; Ret	SUG; 9	FUJ; C	MIN; Ret	FUJ; 5	SUZ; 12	14th	2
1999	Cosmo Oil Racing Team Cerumo	SUZ; 7	MOT; Ret	MIN; Ret	FUJ; 16	SUZ; Ret	SUG; 10	FUJ; Ret	MIN; Ret	MOT; 13	SUZ; 12	NC	0

=== International Formula 3000 results ===
Year	Team	1	2	3	4	5	6	7	8	9	10	DC	Pts
1996	Nordic Racing	NÜR; 14	PAU; 8	PER; 11	HOC; 12	SIL; 13	SPA; Ret	MAG; 14	EST; 12	MUG; 18	HOC; 9	NC	0

=== Complete JGTC/Super GT Results ===
(key) (Races in bold indicate pole position) (Races in italics indicate fastest lap)

Year	Team	Car	Class	1	2	3	4	5	6	7	8	9	DC	Pts
1994	Johnson Nismo	Nissan Skyline GT-R	GT1	FUJ; Ret	SEN; 5	FUJ; 8	SUG; 6	MIN; 9					13th	19
1995	Nismo	Nissan Skyline GT-R	GT1	SUZ; 2	FUJ; 4	SEN; 6	FUJ; 3	SUG; 9	MIN; Ret				9th	30
1997	Raybrig Team Kunimitsu with Mooncraft	Honda NSX	GT500	SUZ	FUJ; Ret	SEN; 16	FUJ; 11	**MIN**; 2	**SUG**; 2				9th	30
1998	Raybrig Team Kunimitsu with Mooncraft	Honda NSX	GT500	**SUZ**; 10	FUJ; C	SEN; 12	**FUJ**; Ret	MOT; 7	**MIN**; 1	SUG; Ret			10th	25
1999	Raybrig Team Kunimitsu with Mooncraft	Honda NSX	GT500	SUZ; Ret	FUJ; 1	SUG; 13	MIN; 15	FUJ; 7	TAI; 5	MOT; 9			11th	34
2000	Raybrig Team Kunimitsu with Mooncraft	Honda NSX	GT500	MOT; Ret	FUJ; 14	SUG; 10	FUJ; 7	TAI; 5	MIN; Ret	SUZ; DSQ			15th	13
2001	Raybrig Team Kunimitsu with Mooncraft	Honda NSX	GT500	TAI; 6	FUJ; 5	**SUG**; Ret	FUJ; 9	MOT; 4	SUZ; 13	MIN; 8			10th	29
2002	Esso Toyota Team LeMans	Toyota Supra	GT500	TAI; 10	**FUJ**; 2	SUG; 1	SEP; 11	FUJ; 7	MOT; 4	MIN; 4	**SUZ**; 3		1st	75
2003	Esso Toyota Team LeMans	Toyota Supra	GT500	TAI; 1	FUJ; 12	**SUG**; 1	FUJ; 6	FUJ; 4	MOT; 4	AUT; 4	SUZ; 7		2nd	**83**
2004	Esso Toyota Team LeMans	Toyota Supra	GT500	TAI; 2	**SUG**; 11	SEP; 14	TOK; 2	MOT; 2	AUT; 4	SUZ; Ret			3rd	57
2005	Esso Toyota Team LeMans	Toyota Supra	GT500	TAI; 11	FUJ; 5	SEP; 4	SUG; 4	MOT; 9	FUJ; 3	AUT; 10	SUZ; 3		6th	51
2006	Mobile 1 Toyota Team Lemans	Lexus SC430	GT500	SUZ; 6	TAI; 11	FUJ; 2	SEP; 14	SUG; 9	SUZ; Ret	MOT; 4	AUT; 13	FUJ; 5	12th	41
2007	Racing Project Bandoh	Toyota Celica	GT300	SUZ; 14	TAI; 19	FUJ; Ret	SEP; 9	SUG; 1	SUZ; 12	MOT; 18	AUT; 4	FUJ; 16	10th	32
2008	Eneos Toyota Team LeMans	Lexus SC430	GT500	SUZ	TAI	FUJ	SEP	SUG; 7	SUZ; 6	MOT; 4	AUT; 14	FUJ	17th	20
2014	LM corsa	BMW Z4 GT3	GT300	TAI; 22	FUJ; 21	AUT; 7	SUG; 10	FUJ; 5	SUZ; 1	CHA; 4	MOT		7th	44
2015	LM corsa	Lexus RC F GT3	GT300	TAI; 10	FUJ; Ret	CHA; Ret	FUJ; 15	SUZ; 19	SUG; 22	AUT; 10	MOT; 17		33rd	2
2016	LM corsa	Lexus RC F GT3	GT300	TAI; 25	FUJ; 21	SUG; Ret	FUJ; 17	SUZ; 18	CHA; 21	MOT; 20	MOT; Ret		NC	0
2017	LM corsa	Lexus RC F GT3	GT300	TAI; 22	FUJ; 8	AUT; 12	SUG; 5	FUJ; 27	SUZ; 4	CHA; 6	MOT; 18		12th	24

Sporting positions
Preceded by Hironori Takeuchi; Yuji Tachikawa	All-Japan Grand Touring Car Champion (GT500); 2002 with: Juichi Wakisaka	Succeeded by Satoshi Motoyama; Michael Krumm
