= 1991 Monaco Grand Prix Formula Three =

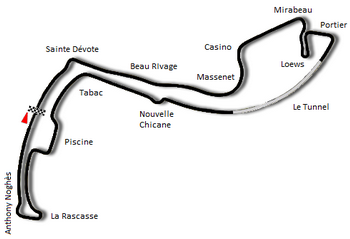
Circuit de Monaco (1986-1996)

Results from the 1991 Monaco Grand Prix Formula Three held at Monte Carlo on May 11, 1991, in the Circuit de Monaco.

== Classification ==
The results are as shown:

Pos	Driver	Constructor	Laps	Time/Retired
1	(Germany) Jörg Müller	Reynard 913-Volkswagen	24	39.28,194
2	(Germany) Klaus Panchyrz	Ralt RT35-Volkswagen	24	39.51,494
3	(Italy) Max Angelelli	Dallara F391-Alfa Romeo	24	40.06,738
4	(Italy) Andrea Gilardi	Dallara F391-Volkswagen	24	40.08,869
5	(France) Yvan Muller	Reynard 913-Alfa Romeo	24	40.09,806
6	(France) Christophe Bouchut	Ralt RT33-Volkswagen	24	40.10,080
7	(Italy) Giambattista Busi	Dallara F391-Volkswagen	24	40.29,505
8	(France) Éric Chéli	Reynard 913-Alfa Romeo	24	40.32,416
9	(France) Jean-Christophe Boullion	Ralt RT33-Volkswagen	24	40.32,891
10	(Italy) Paolo Coloni	Ralt RT35-Alfa Romeo	24	40.33,838
11	(Germany) Marco Werner	Ralt RT35-Opel	24	40.45,665
12	(Brazil) Antonio Stefani	Dallara F391-Alfa Romeo	24	40.48,576
13	(Italy) Max Papis	Dallara F391-Alfa Romeo	24	40.57,299
14	(Italy) Giampiero Simoni	Dallara F391-Alfa Romeo	24	41.00,272
15	(Italy) Michel Raffaelli	Dallara F389-Alfa Romeo	23	
16	(Brazil) Niko Palhares	Dallara F391-Volkswagen	21	
DNF	(France) Arnaud Trevisiol	Dallara F391-Opel	8	
DNF	(Canada) Jacques Villeneuve	Ralt RT35-Alfa Romeo	4	
DNF	(France) Laurent Daumet	Ralt RT35-Volkswagen	4	
DNF	(Germany) Wolfgang Kaufmann	Dallara F391-Opel	3	
DNF	(Denmark) Tom Kristensen	Ralt RT35-Volkswagen	1	
DNF	(Italy) Fabrizio De Simone	Dallara F391-Alfa Romeo	0	
DNF	(France) Guillaume Gomez	Ralt RT35-Alfa Romeo	0	
DNF	(Italy) Andrea Larini	Dallara F391-Alfa Romeo	0	
DNF	(France) Olivier Panis	Ralt RT35-Alfa Romeo	0	
DNF	(Monaco) Olivier Beretta	Reynard 913-Mugen	0	
