= 1996 Italian Superturismo Championship =

Seasons
- ← 1995 1997 →

The 1996 Italian Superturismo Championship was the tenth edition of the Italian Superturismo Championship. The season began in Mugello on 14 April and finished in Vallelunga on 6 October, after ten rounds.

== Season summary ==
The season started with an unexpected double victory of Giovanardi in a semi-official Alfa Romeo. In the following 3 rounds, due to slow tracks and bad weather condition in Monza, Capello and his Audi were able to score 6 wins in a row.

In order to avoid a strong dominance like in 1995, it was decided from the 4th round in Binetto to penalise Audi with 30kg extra bringing the weight from 1040kg to 1070kg. Thanks to this decision and together with the car developments, BMW emerged as dominant car winning 11 races (6 Cecotto and 5 Naspetti) on 12 until the end of the season. Only in race 1 in Imola, Capello was able thanks to his talent to achieve a victory with his heavier Audi.

In the last round in Vallelunga, BMW decided to add 3 more cars for Ravaglia, Winkelhock and Soper while Audi (finally come back to the original weight at 1040kg) added 2 more cars for the new German champion Pirro and his team mate Peter but although a starting grid nearly close to the FIA World Touring Car Cup, none of those drivers was able to help the 3 contended. BMW scored once again a double victory with Cecotto, but Capello thanks to a second and a third place was able to win the title. Naspetti after a race 1 finished only 6th due to a wrong tyre choice, tried his best to catch up Capello in race 2 but after a collision with Muller (Audi), he was penalized with a stop and go giving automatically the title to Capello.

Rinaldo Capello was the new Italian champion after the 2 titles in a row of Pirro, while BMW thanks to the 11 victories against 7 of Audi and 2 of Alfa Romeo was the constructors' champion.

Roberto Colciago was instead the privateers' champion with his Alfa Romeo.

== Teams and drivers ==
Team	Car	No.	Drivers	Rounds	Class
(Italy) Audi Sport Italia	Audi A4 Quattro	1	(Italy) Rinaldo Capello	All	
(Italy) Audi Sport Italia	Audi A4 Quattro	2	(France) Yvan Muller	All	
(Italy) Nordauto Engineering	Alfa Romeo 155 TS	3	(Italy) Fabrizio Giovanardi	All	
(Italy) Nordauto Engineering	Alfa Romeo 155 TS	4	(Italy) Gordon de Adamich	2-10	
(Italy) CiBiEmme Engineering	BMW 320i	5	(Venezuela) Johnny Cecotto	All	
(Italy) CiBiEmme Engineering	BMW 320i	6	(Italy) Emanuele Naspetti	1-8, 10	
(Italy) CiBiEmme Engineering	BMW 318iS	7	(Switzerland) Yolanda Surer	1-6	
(Italy) CiBiEmme Engineering	BMW 320i	7	(Italy) Gianni Morbidelli	7-8, 10	
(Italy) Audi Sport Italia	Audi A4 Quattro	8	(Germany) Frank Biela	9	
(France) A.Z.K./ROC	Audi A4 Quattro	9	(Austria) Philipp Peter	10	
(France) A.Z.K./ROC	Audi A4 Quattro	11	(Italy) Emanuele Pirro	10	
(Italy) Scuderia Bigazzi	BMW 320i	12	(Italy) Roberto Ravaglia	10	
(Italy) Scuderia Bigazzi	BMW 320i	14	(United Kingdom) Steve Soper	10	
(Italy) Scuderia Bigazzi	BMW 320i	15	(Germany) Joachim Winkelhock	10	
(Italy) Motortrend	Peugeot 405	51	(Italy) Massimiliano Pezzuto	1-6, 9	P
(Italy) Motortrend	Peugeot 405	52	(Italy) Giambattista Busi	1, 5-6	P
(Italy) Motortrend	Peugeot 405	53	(Italy) Raffaele Fortunato	1-6, 8	P
(Italy) Motortrend	Peugeot 405	54	(Italy) Luigi Moccia	1	P
(Italy) Motortrend	Peugeot 405	54	(Italy) Alessandro Belloni	3	P
(Italy) Motortrend	Peugeot 405	54	(Italy) Giampaolo Vicarelli	4	P
(Italy) Motortrend	Peugeot 405	54	(Italy) Gianluca de Lorenzi	5	P
(Italy) Motortrend	Peugeot 405	54	(Italy) Marco Antonelli	9	P
(Italy) Motortrend	Peugeot 405	54	(Italy) Massimiliano Blancardi	10	P
(Italy) Soli Racing Team	Alfa Romeo 155 TS	55	(Italy) Moreno Soli	All	P
(Italy) Soli Racing Team	Alfa Romeo 155 TS	58	(Italy) Massimo Pigoli	6, 8-10	P
(Italy) Soli Racing Team	Alfa Romeo 155 TS	58	(Switzerland) Felipe Ortiz	6, 8-9	P
(Italy) EC Motorsport	Alfa Romeo 155 TS	56	(Italy) Roberto Colciago	1-6, 9-10	P
(Italy) Tecnica Racing Team	Alfa Romeo 155 TS	57	(Italy) Felice Tedeschi	3-10	P
(Italy) Tecnica Racing Team	Alfa Romeo 155 TS	58	(Italy) Massimo Pigoli	1-5	P
(Italy) Tecnica Racing Team	Alfa Romeo 155 TS	59	(Italy) Alessandro Gabrielli	1-3	P
(Italy) CiBiEmme Engineering	BMW 320i	60	(Italy) Emanuele Naspetti	9	
(Italy) Capannelle Racing	Opel Vectra	61	(Italy) Sergio Sambataro	1-3, 5-6, 9-10	P
(Italy) Capannelle Racing	Opel Vectra	62	(Italy) Fabrizio Fede	10	P
(Italy) Varese Corse	Alfa Romeo 155 TS	63	(Italy) Davide Bernasconi	1-6, 8-10	P
(Italy) Varese Corse	Alfa Romeo 155 TS	63	(Italy) Augusto Rossetti	5, 9	P
(Italy) Ciemme Corse	Opel Vectra	64	(Italy) Marco Brand	1-3	P
(Italy) Varese Corse	Alfa Romeo 155 TS	65	(Italy) Tarcisio Bernasconi	10	P
(Italy) Varese Corse	Alfa Romeo 155 TS	65	(Italy) Augusto Rossetti	10	P
(Italy) Tecnica Racing Team	Alfa Romeo 155 TS	66	(Italy) Gianluca Sansoni	6-10	P
(Italy) Falessi Racing	Alfa Romeo 155 TS	67	(Italy) Lorenzo Falessi	5-6, 9-10	P
(Czech Republic) Bychl Euroracing	BMW 318i	68	(Czech Republic) Miloš Tesar	5	P
(Italy) Erre Team	BMW 318i	69	(Italy) Maurizio Lusuardi	3, 5-6, 8-10	P
(Italy) Erre Team	BMW 318i	69	(Italy) Stefano Gabellini	3, 5-6, 8	P
(Italy) Erre Team	BMW 318i	69	(Italy) Giampiero Pindari	9	P
(Italy) CiBiEmme Engineering	BMW 320i	70	(Italy) Gianni Morbidelli	9	
(Serbia and Montenegro) Optima Modica Beograd	Alfa Romeo 155 TS	82	(Serbia and Montenegro) Milovan Vesnić	10	P
(Germany) Engstler Motorsport	Alfa Romeo 155 TS	83	(Germany) Marco Bromberger	10	P
(Germany) Engstler Motorsport	Alfa Romeo 155 TS	84	(Germany) Franz Engstler	10	P

Icon	Class
P	Private Drivers

=== Drivers changes ===
Changed Cars

- Roberto Colciago: Opel Vectra → Alfa Romeo 155

Entering Superturismo 1996

- Yvan Muller: French Supertouring → Audi A4 Quattro
- Johnny Cecotto: BTCC → BMW 320i
- Gordon De Adamich: CIVT → Alfa Romeo 155

Leaving Superturismo 1996

- Emanuele Pirro: → STW
- Antonio Tamburini: No full-time drive
- Gabriele Tarquini: → DTM/ITC
- Oscar Larrauri: → Japanese GT

== Race calendar and results ==
Round		Circuit	Date	Pole position	Fastest lap	Winning driver	Winning team
1	R1	(Italy) Autodromo Internazionale del Mugello	14 April	(Italy) Emanuele Naspetti	(Italy) Rinaldo Capello	(Italy) Fabrizio Giovanardi	(Italy) Nordauto Engineering
1	R2	(Italy) Autodromo Internazionale del Mugello	14 April		(Italy) Fabrizio Giovanardi	(Italy) Fabrizio Giovanardi	(Italy) Nordauto Engineering
2	R1	(Italy) Autodromo di Magione	21 April	(France) Yvan Muller	(France) Yvan Muller	(Italy) Rinaldo Capello	(Italy) Audi Sport Italia
2	R2	(Italy) Autodromo di Magione	21 April		(France) Yvan Muller	(Italy) Rinaldo Capello	(Italy) Audi Sport Italia
3	R1	(Italy) Autodromo Nazionale Monza	12 May	(Venezuela) Johnny Cecotto	(Italy) Fabrizio Giovanardi	(Italy) Rinaldo Capello	(Italy) Audi Sport Italia
3	R2	(Italy) Autodromo Nazionale Monza	12 May		(Venezuela) Johnny Cecotto	(Italy) Rinaldo Capello	(Italy) Audi Sport Italia
4	R1	(Italy) Autodromo del Levante	26 May	(Italy) Rinaldo Capello	(France) Yvan Muller	(Italy) Rinaldo Capello	(Italy) Audi Sport Italia
4	R2	(Italy) Autodromo del Levante	26 May		(Italy) Emanuele Naspetti	(Italy) Rinaldo Capello	(Italy) Audi Sport Italia
5	R1	(Italy) Circuito Internazionale Misano	7 July	(Venezuela) Johnny Cecotto	(Italy) Emanuele Naspetti	(Venezuela) Johnny Cecotto	(Italy) CiBiEmme Engineering
5	R2	(Italy) Circuito Internazionale Misano	7 July		(Venezuela) Johnny Cecotto	(Venezuela) Johnny Cecotto	(Italy) CiBiEmme Engineering
6	R1	(Italy) Autodromo Enzo e Dino Ferrari	21 July	(Venezuela) Johnny Cecotto	(Italy) Emanuele Naspetti	(Italy) Rinaldo Capello	(Italy) Audi Sport Italia
6	R2	(Italy) Autodromo Enzo e Dino Ferrari	21 July		(Venezuela) Johnny Cecotto	(Italy) Emanuele Naspetti	(Italy) CiBiEmme Engineering
7	R1	(Italy) Autodromo di Pergusa	4 August	(Italy) Emanuele Naspetti	(Italy) Fabrizio Giovanardi	(Italy) Emanuele Naspetti	(Italy) CiBiEmme Engineering
7	R2	(Italy) Autodromo di Pergusa	4 August		(Italy) Fabrizio Giovanardi	(Italy) Emanuele Naspetti	(Italy) CiBiEmme Engineering
8	R1	(Italy) Autodromo di Pergusa	1 September	(Italy) Fabrizio Giovanardi	(Venezuela) Johnny Cecotto	(Italy) Emanuele Naspetti	(Italy) CiBiEmme Engineering
8	R2	(Italy) Autodromo di Pergusa	1 September		(Italy) Emanuele Naspetti	(Italy) Emanuele Naspetti	(Italy) CiBiEmme Engineering
9	R1	(Italy) Autodromo Riccardo Paletti di Varano	15 September	(Venezuela) Johnny Cecotto	(Venezuela) Johnny Cecotto	(Venezuela) Johnny Cecotto	(Italy) CiBiEmme Engineering
9	R2	(Italy) Autodromo Riccardo Paletti di Varano	15 September		(Venezuela) Johnny Cecotto	(Italy) Emanuele Naspetti	(Italy) CiBiEmme Engineering
10	R1	(Italy) ACI Vallelunga Circuit	6 October	(Italy) Roberto Ravaglia	(United Kingdom) Steve Soper	(Venezuela) Johnny Cecotto	(Italy) CiBiEmme Engineering
10	R2	(Italy) ACI Vallelunga Circuit	6 October		(Germany) Joachim Winkelhock	(Venezuela) Johnny Cecotto	(Italy) CiBiEmme Engineering

== Round 1 (Italy) Mugello ==
Qualifying

Pos	No	Driver	Car	Lap Time	Top Qualifying
1	6	(Italy) Emanuele Naspetti	BMW 320i	1.57.663	TQ Group 1
2	1	(Italy) Rinaldo Capello	Audi A4 Quattro	1.57.808	TQ Group 1
3	5	(Venezuela) Johnny Cecotto	BMW 320i	1.57.873	TQ Group 1
4	3	(Italy) Fabrizio Giovanardi	Alfa Romeo 155	1.57.992	TQ Group 1
5	2	(France) Yvan Muller	Audi A4 Quattro	1.58.198	TQ Group 1
6	56	(Italy) Roberto Colciago	Alfa Romeo 155	1.59.409	TQ Group 1
7	64	(Italy) Marco Brand	Opel Vectra GT	2.01.399	TQ Group 1
8	58	(Italy) Massimo Pigoli	Alfa Romeo 155	2.01.691	TQ Group 1
9	52	(Italy) Gianbattista Busi	Peugeot 405	2.01.534	TQ Group 2
10	51	(Italy) Massimiliano Pezzuto	Peugeot 405	2.05.145	TQ Group 2
11	63	(Italy) Davide Bernasconi	Alfa Romeo 155	2.02.940	
12	7	(Switzerland) Yolanda Surer	BMW 318iS	2.03.345	
13	53	(Italy) Raffaele Fortunato	Peugeot 405	2.03.522	
14	55	(Italy) Moreno Soli	Alfa Romeo 155	2.03.756	
15	61	(Italy) Sergio Sambataro	Opel Vectra GT	2.05.069	
16	59	(Italy) Alessandro Gabrielli	Alfa Romeo 155	2.05.509	
17	54	(Italy) Luigi Moccia	Peugeot 405	2.08.271	

Race 1

Pos	No	Driver	Constructor	Time/Retired	Points
1	3	(Italy) Fabrizio Giovanardi	Alfa Romeo 155	15 laps in 30:20.112	20
2	5	(Venezuela) Johnny Cecotto	BMW 320i	+0.828s	15
3	6	(Italy) Emanuele Naspetti	BMW 320i	+1.811s	12
4	2	(France) Yvan Muller	Audi A4 Quattro	+2.456s	10
5	1	(Italy) Rinaldo Capello	Audi A4 Quattro	+6.754s	8
6	56	(Italy) Roberto Colciago	Alfa Romeo 155	+25.748s	6
7	58	(Italy) Massimo Pigoli	Alfa Romeo 155	+1.11.824s	4
8	63	(Italy) Davide Bernasconi	Alfa Romeo 155	+1.14.113s	3
9	52	(Italy) Gianbattista Busi	Peugeot 405	+1.24.072s	2
10	51	(Italy) Massimiliano Pezzuto	Peugeot 405	+1.24.311s	1
11	55	(Italy) Moreno Soli	Alfa Romeo 155	+1.41.468s	
12	53	(Italy) Raffaele Fortunato	Peugeot 405	+1.45.062s	
13	54	(Italy) Luigi Moccia	Peugeot 405	+1 lap	
14 DNF	7	(Switzerland) Yolanda Surer	BMW 318iS	+6 laps	
DNF	61	(Italy) Sergio Sambataro	Opel Vectra GT	+13 laps	
DNF	59	(Italy) Alessandro Gabrielli	Alfa Romeo 155	+13 laps	
DNF	64	(Italy) Marco Brand	Opel Vectra GT	+15 laps	

Race 2

Pos	No	Driver	Constructor	Time/Retired	Points
1	3	(Italy) Fabrizio Giovanardi	Alfa Romeo 155	15 laps in 30:12.134	20
2	6	(Italy) Emanuele Naspetti	BMW 320i	+1.672s	15
3	5	(Venezuela) Johnny Cecotto	BMW 320i	+2.004s	12
4	1	(Italy) Rinaldo Capello	Audi A4 Quattro	+9.900s	10
5	2	(France) Yvan Muller	Audi A4 Quattro	+10.160s	8
6	56	(Italy) Roberto Colciago	Alfa Romeo 155	+30.940s	6
7	64	(Italy) Marco Brand	Opel Vectra GT	+1.06.495s	4
8	63	(Italy) Davide Bernasconi	Alfa Romeo 155	+1.29.243s	3
9	51	(Italy) Massimiliano Pezzuto	Peugeot 405	+1.34.124s	2
10	55	(Italy) Moreno Soli	Alfa Romeo 155	+1.45.944s	1
11 DNF	53	(Italy) Raffaele Fortunato	Peugeot 405	+3 laps	
12 DNF	58	(Italy) Massimo Pigoli	Alfa Romeo 155	+7 laps	
DNS	52	(Italy) Gianbattista Busi	Peugeot 405		
DNS	54	(Italy) Luigi Moccia	Peugeot 405		
DNS	7	(Switzerland) Yolanda Surer	BMW 318iS		
DNS	61	(Italy) Sergio Sambataro	Opel Vectra GT		
DNS	59	(Italy) Alessandro Gabrielli	Alfa Romeo 155		

=== Championship standings after Round 1 ===
Drivers' Championship standings

Pos	Driver	Points
1	(Italy) Fabrizio Giovanardi	40
2	(Venezuela) Johnny Cecotto	27
3	(Italy) Emanuele Naspetti	27
4	(Italy) Rinaldo Capello	18
5	(France) Yvan Muller	18

Constructors' Championship standings

Pos	Constructor	Points
1	(Germany) BMW	54
2	(Italy) Alfa Romeo	52
3	(Germany) Audi	36

== Round 2 (Italy) Magione ==
Qualifying

Pos	No	Driver	Car	Lap Time	Top Qualifying
1	2	(France) Yvan Muller	Audi A4 Quattro	1.14.266	TQ Group 1
2	1	(Italy) Rinaldo Capello	Audi A4 Quattro	1.14.607	TQ Group 1
3	3	(Italy) Fabrizio Giovanardi	Alfa Romeo 155	1.15.320	TQ Group 1
4	6	(Italy) Emanuele Naspetti	BMW 320i	1.15.404	TQ Group 1
5	5	(Venezuela) Johnny Cecotto	BMW 320i	1.15.547	TQ Group 1
6	4	(Italy) Gordon De Adamich	Alfa Romeo 155	1.16.514	TQ Group 1
7	56	(Italy) Roberto Colciago	Alfa Romeo 155	1.17.283	TQ Group 1
8	58	(Italy) Massimo Pigoli	Alfa Romeo 155	1.17.501	TQ Group 1
9	7	(Switzerland) Yolanda Surer	BMW 318iS	1.17.725	TQ Group 1
10	51	(Italy) Massimiliano Pezzuto	Peugeot 405	1.18.365	TQ Group 1
11	64	(Italy) Marco Brand	Opel Vectra GT	1.18.636	TQ Group 2
12	59	(Italy) Alessandro Gabrielli	Alfa Romeo 155	1.19.497	TQ Group 2
13	63	(Italy) Davide Bernasconi	Alfa Romeo 155	1.19.776	TQ Group 2
14	53	(Italy) Raffaele Fortunato	Peugeot 405	1.20.114	TQ Group 2
15	55	(Italy) Moreno Soli	Alfa Romeo 155	1.17.800	
16	61	(Italy) Sergio Sambataro	Opel Vectra GT	1.21.093	

Race 1

Pos	No	Driver	Constructor	Time/Retired	Points
1	1	(Italy) Rinaldo Capello	Audi A4 Quattro	32 laps in 41:18.584	20
2	2	(France) Yvan Muller	Audi A4 Quattro	+0.348s	15
3	3	(Italy) Fabrizio Giovanardi	Alfa Romeo 155	+20.961s	12
4	5	(Venezuela) Johnny Cecotto	BMW 320i	+21.672s	10
5	6	(Italy) Emanuele Naspetti	BMW 320i	+1.16.735s	8
6	56	(Italy) Roberto Colciago	Alfa Romeo 155	+1 lap	6
7	4	(Italy) Gordon De Adamich	Alfa Romeo 155	+1 lap	4
8	58	(Italy) Massimo Pigoli	Alfa Romeo 155	+1 lap	3
9	51	(Italy) Massimiliano Pezzuto	Peugeot 405	+2 laps	2
10	55	(Italy) Moreno Soli	Alfa Romeo 155	+2 laps	1
11	63	(Italy) Davide Bernasconi	Alfa Romeo 155	+2 laps	
12	59	(Italy) Alessandro Gabrielli	Alfa Romeo 155	+3 laps	
13	7	(Switzerland) Yolanda Surer	BMW 318iS	+3 laps	
14	53	(Italy) Raffaele Fortunato	Peugeot 405	+3 laps	
DNF	61	(Italy) Sergio Sambataro	Opel Vectra GT	+20 laps	
DNF	64	(Italy) Marco Brand	Opel Vectra GT	+20 laps	

Race 2

Pos	No	Driver	Constructor	Time/Retired	Points
1	1	(Italy) Rinaldo Capello	Audi A4 Quattro	32 laps in 41:01.145	20
2	2	(France) Yvan Muller	Audi A4 Quattro	+0.613s	15
3	3	(Italy) Fabrizio Giovanardi	Alfa Romeo 155	+12.758s	12
4	6	(Italy) Emanuele Naspetti	BMW 320i	+48.831s	10
5	56	(Italy) Roberto Colciago	Alfa Romeo 155	+1.12.643s	8
6	4	(Italy) Gordon De Adamich	Alfa Romeo 155	+1 lap	6
7	58	(Italy) Massimo Pigoli	Alfa Romeo 155	+1 lap	4
8	55	(Italy) Moreno Soli	Alfa Romeo 155	+1 lap	3
9	51	(Italy) Massimiliano Pezzuto	Peugeot 405	+2 laps	2
10	7	(Switzerland) Yolanda Surer	BMW 318iS	+2 laps	1
11	53	(Italy) Raffaele Fortunato	Peugeot 405	+2 laps	
12	59	(Italy) Alessandro Gabrielli	Alfa Romeo 155	+2 laps	
DNF	61	(Italy) Sergio Sambataro	Opel Vectra GT	+17 laps	
DNF	63	(Italy) Davide Bernasconi	Alfa Romeo 155	+29 laps	
DNS	64	(Italy) Marco Brand	Opel Vectra GT		
DNS	5	(Venezuela) Johnny Cecotto	BMW 320i		

=== Championship standings after Round 2 ===
Drivers' Championship standings

Pos	Driver	Points
1	(Italy) Fabrizio Giovanardi	64
2	(Italy) Rinaldo Capello	58
3	(France) Yvan Muller	48
4	(Italy) Emanuele Naspetti	45
5	(Venezuela) Johnny Cecotto	37

Constructors' Championship standings

Pos	Constructor	Points
1	(Germany) Audi	106
2	(Italy) Alfa Romeo	90
3	(Germany) BMW	83

== Round 3 (Italy) Monza ==
Qualifying

Pos	No	Driver	Car	Lap Time	Top Qualifying
1	5	(Venezuela) Johnny Cecotto	BMW 320i	1.55.537	TQ Group 1
2	6	(Italy) Emanuele Naspetti	BMW 320i	1.55.673	TQ Group 1
3	2	(France) Yvan Muller	Audi A4 Quattro	1.55.808	TQ Group 1
4	3	(Italy) Fabrizio Giovanardi	Alfa Romeo 155	1.56.255	TQ Group 1
5	1	(Italy) Rinaldo Capello	Audi A4 Quattro	1.56.315	TQ Group 1
6	56	(Italy) Roberto Colciago	Alfa Romeo 155	1.57.850	TQ Group 1
7	58	(Italy) Massimo Pigoli	Alfa Romeo 155	1.58.928	TQ Group 1
8	64	(Italy) Marco Brand	Opel Vectra GT	1.59.552	TQ Group 1
9	69	(Italy) Maurizio Lusuardi	BMW 318iS	2.02.395	TQ Group 2
9	69	(Italy) Stefano Gabellini	BMW 318iS	2.02.395	TQ Group 2
10	4	(Italy) Gordon De Adamich	Alfa Romeo 155	1.59.014	
11	7	(Switzerland) Yolanda Surer	BMW 318iS	1.59.374	
12	57	(Italy) Felice Tedeschi	Alfa Romeo 155	no time	TQ Group 2
13	63	(Italy) Davide Bernasconi	Alfa Romeo 155	2.00.998	
14	51	(Italy) Massimiliano Pezzuto	Peugeot 405	2.01.011	
15	55	(Italy) Moreno Soli	Alfa Romeo 155	2.02.495	
16	53	(Italy) Raffaele Fortunato	Peugeot 405	2.02.152	
17	61	(Italy) Sergio Sambataro	Opel Vectra GT	2.02.495	
18	59	(Italy) Alessandro Gabrielli	Alfa Romeo 155	2.03.676	
19	54	(Italy) Alessandro Belloni	Peugeot 405	2.05.716	

Race 1

Pos	No	Driver	Constructor	Time/Retired	Points
1	1	(Italy) Rinaldo Capello	Audi A4 Quattro	14 laps in 30:14.931	20
2	2	(France) Yvan Muller	Audi A4 Quattro	+0.449s	15
3	3	(Italy) Fabrizio Giovanardi	Alfa Romeo 155	+2.014s	12
4	5	(Venezuela) Johnny Cecotto	BMW 320i	+14.214s	10
5	56	(Italy) Roberto Colciago	Alfa Romeo 155	+47.997s	8
6	64	(Italy) Marco Brand	Opel Vectra GT	+1.01.112s	6
7	7	(Switzerland) Yolanda Surer	BMW 318iS	+1.16.438s	4
8	6	(Italy) Emanuele Naspetti	BMW 320i	+1.17.613s	3
9	58	(Italy) Massimo Pigoli	Alfa Romeo 155	+1.32.185s	2
10	63	(Italy) Davide Bernasconi	Alfa Romeo 155	+.34.130s	1
11	51	(Italy) Massimiliano Pezzuto	Peugeot 405	+1.53.945s	
12	53	(Italy) Raffaele Fortunato	Peugeot 405	+1.56.354s	
13	61	(Italy) Sergio Sambataro	Opel Vectra GT	+1.58.586s	
14	55	(Italy) Moreno Soli	Alfa Romeo 155	+1 lap	
15	57	(Italy) Felice Tedeschi	Alfa Romeo 155	+1 lap	
16	59	(Italy) Alessandro Gabrielli	Alfa Romeo 155	+3 laps	
DNF	69	(Italy) Maurizio Lusuardi	BMW 318iS	+11 laps	
DNF	4	(Italy) Gordon De Adamich	Alfa Romeo 155	+12 laps	
DNS	54	(Italy) Alessandro Belloni	Peugeot 405		

Race 2

Pos	No	Driver	Constructor	Time/Retired	Points
1	1	(Italy) Rinaldo Capello	Audi A4 Quattro	14 laps in 30:35.163	20
2	2	(France) Yvan Muller	Audi A4 Quattro	+0.316s	15
3	5	(Venezuela) Johnny Cecotto	BMW 320i	+6.882s	12
4	3	(Italy) Fabrizio Giovanardi	Alfa Romeo 155	+21.310s	10
5	56	(Italy) Roberto Colciago	Alfa Romeo 155	+31.128s	8
6	64	(Italy) Marco Brand	Opel Vectra GT	+56.296s	6
7	61	(Italy) Sergio Sambataro	Opel Vectra GT	+1.16.084s	4
8	55	(Italy) Moreno Soli	Alfa Romeo 155	+1.46.663s	3
9	59	(Italy) Alessandro Gabrielli	Alfa Romeo 155	+1.55.778s	2
10	69	(Italy) Stefano Gabellini	BMW 318iS	+1 lap	1
DNF	58	(Italy) Massimo Pigoli	Alfa Romeo 155	+10 laps	
DNF	51	(Italy) Massimiliano Pezzuto	Peugeot 405	+13 laps	
DNF	7	(Switzerland) Yolanda Surer	BMW 318iS	+14 laps	
DNF	6	(Italy) Emanuele Naspetti	BMW 320i	+14 laps	
DNF	63	(Italy) Davide Bernasconi	Alfa Romeo 155	+14 laps	
DNF	53	(Italy) Raffaele Fortunato	Peugeot 405	+14 laps	
DNF	57	(Italy) Felice Tedeschi	Alfa Romeo 155	+14 laps	
DNS	4	(Italy) Gordon De Adamich	Alfa Romeo 155		
DNS	54	(Italy) Alessandro Belloni	Peugeot 405		

=== Championship standings after Round 3 ===
Drivers' Championship standings

Pos	Driver	Points
1	(Italy) Rinaldo Capello	98
2	(Italy) Fabrizio Giovanardi	86
3	(France) Yvan Muller	78
4	(Venezuela) Johnny Cecotto	59
5	(Italy) Emanuele Naspetti	48

Constructors' Championship standings

Pos	Constructor	Points
1	(Germany) Audi	176
2	(Italy) Alfa Romeo	128
3	(Germany) BMW	114

== Round 4 (Italy) Binetto ==
Qualifying

Pos	No	Driver	Car	Lap Time	Top Qualifying
1	1	(Italy) Rinaldo Capello	Audi A4 Quattro	47.846	TQ
2	6	(Italy) Emanuele Naspetti	BMW 320i	48.116	TQ
3	3	(Italy) Fabrizio Giovanardi	Alfa Romeo 155	48.137	TQ
4	2	(France) Yvan Muller	Audi A4 Quattro	48.231	TQ
5	5	(Venezuela) Johnny Cecotto	BMW 320i	48.573	TQ
6	4	(Italy) Gordon De Adamich	Alfa Romeo 155	50.058	TQ
7	56	(Italy) Roberto Colciago	Alfa Romeo 155	50.160	TQ
8	7	(Switzerland) Yolanda Surer	BMW 318iS	50.255	TQ
9	51	(Italy) Massimiliano Pezzuto	Peugeot 405	50.345	TQ
10	58	(Italy) Massimo Pigoli	Alfa Romeo 155	50.354	TQ
11	57	(Italy) Felice Tedeschi	Alfa Romeo 155	49.671	
12	55	(Italy) Moreno Soli	Alfa Romeo 155	50.258	
13	53	(Italy) Raffaele Fortunato	Peugeot 405	50.883	
14	54	(Italy) Gianpaolo Vicarelli	Peugeot 405	51.196	
15	63	(Italy) Davide Bernasconi	Alfa Romeo 155	51.359	

Race 1

Pos	No	Driver	Constructor	Time/Retired	Points
1	1	(Italy) Rinaldo Capello	Audi A4 Quattro	34 laps in 28:08.989	20
2	2	(France) Yvan Muller	Audi A4 Quattro	+4.368s	15
3	5	(Venezuela) Johnny Cecotto	BMW 320i	+8.034s	12
4	6	(Italy) Emanuele Naspetti	BMW 320i	+21.693s	10
5	3	(Italy) Fabrizio Giovanardi	Alfa Romeo 155	+31.596s	8
6	51	(Italy) Massimiliano Pezzuto	Peugeot 405	+1 lap	6
7	58	(Italy) Massimo Pigoli	Alfa Romeo 155	+1 lap	4
8	7	(Switzerland) Yolanda Surer	BMW 318iS	+1 lap	3
9	54	(Italy) Gianpaolo Vicarelli	Peugeot 405	+2 laps	2
10	53	(Italy) Raffaele Fortunato	Peugeot 405	+2 laps	1
11	63	(Italy) Davide Bernasconi	Alfa Romeo 155	+2 laps	
12 DNF	55	(Italy) Moreno Soli	Alfa Romeo 155	+6 laps	
13 DNF	57	(Italy) Felice Tedeschi	Alfa Romeo 155	+16 laps	
DNF	4	(Italy) Gordon De Adamich	Alfa Romeo 155	+19 laps	
DNF	56	(Italy) Roberto Colciago	Alfa Romeo 155	+21 laps	

Race 2

Pos	No	Driver	Constructor	Time/Retired	Points
1	1	(Italy) Rinaldo Capello	Audi A4 Quattro	34 laps in 28:05.076	20
2	5	(Venezuela) Johnny Cecotto	BMW 320i	+3.659s	15
3	2	(France) Yvan Muller	Audi A4 Quattro	+4.222s	12
4	6	(Italy) Emanuele Naspetti	BMW 320i	+6.286s	10
5	56	(Italy) Roberto Colciago	Alfa Romeo 155	+1 lap	8
6	51	(Italy) Massimiliano Pezzuto	Peugeot 405	+1 lap	6
7	3	(Italy) Fabrizio Giovanardi	Alfa Romeo 155	+1 lap	4
8	58	(Italy) Massimo Pigoli	Alfa Romeo 155	+1 lap	3
9	7	(Switzerland) Yolanda Surer	BMW 318iS	+1 lap	2
10	53	(Italy) Raffaele Fortunato	Peugeot 405	+2 laps	1
11	63	(Italy) Davide Bernasconi	Alfa Romeo 155	+2 laps	
12	55	(Italy) Moreno Soli	Alfa Romeo 155	+4 laps	
13 DNF	4	(Italy) Gordon De Adamich	Alfa Romeo 155	+8 laps	
14 DNF	54	(Italy) Gianpaolo Vicarelli	Peugeot 405	+12 laps	
15 DNF	57	(Italy) Felice Tedeschi	Alfa Romeo 155	+17 laps	

=== Championship standings after Round 4 ===
Drivers' Championship standings

Pos	Driver	Points
1	(Italy) Rinaldo Capello	138
2	(France) Yvan Muller	105
3	(Italy) Fabrizio Giovanardi	98
4	(Venezuela) Johnny Cecotto	86
5	(Italy) Emanuele Naspetti	68

Constructors' Championship standings

Pos	Constructor	Points
1	(Germany) Audi	243
2	(Germany) BMW	161
3	(Italy) Alfa Romeo	156

== Round 5 (Italy) Misano Adriatico ==
Qualifying

Pos	No	Driver	Car	Lap Time	Top Qualifying
1	5	(Venezuela) Johnny Cecotto	BMW 320i	1.36.810	TQ
2	6	(Italy) Emanuele Naspetti	BMW 320i	1.36.920	TQ
3	3	(Italy) Fabrizio Giovanardi	Alfa Romeo 155	1.37.173	TQ
4	1	(Italy) Rinaldo Capello	Audi A4 Quattro	1.37.418	TQ
5	2	(France) Yvan Muller	Audi A4 Quattro	1.38.512	TQ
6	56	(Italy) Roberto Colciago	Alfa Romeo 155	1.39.440	TQ
7	4	(Italy) Gordon De Adamich	Alfa Romeo 155	1.39.631	TQ
8	55	(Italy) Moreno Soli	Alfa Romeo 155	1.40.926	TQ
9	7	(Switzerland) Yolanda Surer	BMW 318iS	1.41.504	TQ
10	58	(Italy) Massimo Pigoli	Alfa Romeo 155	1.41.515	TQ
11	51	(Italy) Massimiliano Pezzuto	Peugeot 405	1.41.078	
12	63	(Italy) Davide Bernasconi	Alfa Romeo 155	1.41.193	
12	63	(Italy) Augusto Rossetti	Alfa Romeo 155	1.41.193	
13	52	(Italy) Giambattista Busi	Peugeot 405	1.41.499	
14	68	(Czech Republic) Miloš Tesar	BMW 318iS	1.41.914	
15	69	(Italy) Maurizio Lusuardi	BMW 318iS	1.41.986	
15	69	(Italy) Stefano Gabellini	BMW 318iS	1.41.986	
16	53	(Italy) Raffaele Fortunato	Peugeot 405	1.42.150	
17	61	(Italy) Sergio Sambataro	Opel Vectra GT	1.42.322	
18	54	(Italy) Gianluca De Lorenzi	Peugeot 405	1.43.026	
19	67	(Italy) Lorenzo Falessi	Alfa Romeo 155	1.44.859	
20	57	(Italy) Felice Tedeschi	Alfa Romeo 155	1.55.136	

Race 1

Pos	No	Driver	Constructor	Time/Retired	Points
1	5	(Venezuela) Johnny Cecotto	BMW 320i	18 laps in 29:51.105	20
2	6	(Italy) Emanuele Naspetti	BMW 320i	+0.335s	15
3	1	(Italy) Rinaldo Capello	Audi A4 Quattro	+1.077s	12
4	2	(France) Yvan Muller	Audi A4 Quattro	+4.496s	10
5	3	(Italy) Fabrizio Giovanardi	Alfa Romeo 155	+11.325s	8
6	56	(Italy) Roberto Colciago	Alfa Romeo 155	+39.807s	6
7	58	(Italy) Massimo Pigoli	Alfa Romeo 155	+59.296s	4
8	4	(Italy) Gordon De Adamich	Alfa Romeo 155	+59.342s	3
9	7	(Switzerland) Yolanda Surer	BMW 318iS	+1.00.106s	2
10	51	(Italy) Massimiliano Pezzuto	Peugeot 405	+1.02.743s	1
11	57	(Italy) Felice Tedeschi	Alfa Romeo 155	+1.08.286s	
12	63	(Italy) Davide Bernasconi	Alfa Romeo 155	+1.10.852s	
13	53	(Italy) Raffaele Fortunato	Peugeot 405	+1.27.242s	
14	69	(Italy) Maurizio Lusuardi	BMW 318iS	+1.36.186s	
15	61	(Italy) Sergio Sambataro	Opel Vectra GT	+1.36.497s	
16	55	(Italy) Moreno Soli	Alfa Romeo 155	+1 lap	
17	67	(Italy) Lorenzo Falessi	Alfa Romeo 155	+3 laps	
DNF	52	(Italy) Giambattista Busi	Peugeot 405	+11 laps	
DNF	54	(Italy) Gianluca De Lorenzi	Peugeot 405	+15 laps	
DNF	68	(Czech Republic) Miloš Tesar	BMW 318iS	+17 laps	

Race 2

Pos	No	Driver	Constructor	Time/Retired	Points
1	5	(Venezuela) Johnny Cecotto	BMW 320i	18 laps in 29:47.005	20
2	6	(Italy) Emanuele Naspetti	BMW 320i	+2.899s	15
3	2	(France) Yvan Muller	Audi A4 Quattro	+3.835s	12
4	1	(Italy) Rinaldo Capello	Audi A4 Quattro	+4.769s	10
5	56	(Italy) Roberto Colciago	Alfa Romeo 155	+34.801s	8
6	4	(Italy) Gordon De Adamich	Alfa Romeo 155	+53.265s	6
7	7	(Switzerland) Yolanda Surer	BMW 318iS	+1.00.307s	4
8	51	(Italy) Massimiliano Pezzuto	Peugeot 405	+1.10.056s	3
9	53	(Italy) Raffaele Fortunato	Peugeot 405	+1.28.698s	2
10	68	(Czech Republic) Miloš Tesar	BMW 318iS	+1.35.107s	1
11	3	(Italy) Fabrizio Giovanardi	Alfa Romeo 155	+1.36.401s	
12	63	(Italy) Augusto Rossetti	Alfa Romeo 155	+1.36.430s	
13	69	(Italy) Stefano Gabellini	BMW 318iS	+1 lap	
14	55	(Italy) Moreno Soli	Alfa Romeo 155	+2 laps	
15	61	(Italy) Sergio Sambataro	Opel Vectra GT	+8 laps	
DNF	58	(Italy) Massimo Pigoli	Alfa Romeo 155	+14 laps	
DNF	67	(Italy) Lorenzo Falessi	Alfa Romeo 155	+16 laps	
DNF	52	(Italy) Giambattista Busi	Peugeot 405	+17 laps	
DNS	57	(Italy) Felice Tedeschi	Alfa Romeo 155		
DNS	54	(Italy) Gianluca De Lorenzi	Peugeot 405		

=== Championship standings after Round 5 ===
Drivers' Championship standings

Pos	Driver	Points
1	(Italy) Rinaldo Capello	(160) 142 after 2 worse results
2	(Venezuela) Johnny Cecotto	(126) 116 after 2 worse results
3	(France) Yvan Muller	(127) 109 after 2 worse results
4	(Italy) Fabrizio Giovanardi	(106) 102 after 2 worse results
5	(Italy) Emanuele Naspetti	(98) 95 after 2 worse results

Constructors' Championship standings

Pos	Constructor	Points
1	(Germany) Audi	287
2	(Germany) BMW	231
3	(Italy) Alfa Romeo	184

== Round 6 (Italy) Imola ==
Qualifying

Pos	No	Driver	Car	Lap Time	Top Qualifying
1	5	(Venezuela) Johnny Cecotto	BMW 320i	1.57.479	TQ
2	6	(Italy) Emanuele Naspetti	BMW 320i	1.57.680	TQ
3	1	(Italy) Rinaldo Capello	Audi A4 Quattro	1.57.882	TQ
4	2	(France) Yvan Muller	Audi A4 Quattro	1.58.659	TQ
5	3	(Italy) Fabrizio Giovanardi	Alfa Romeo 155	2.00.254	TQ
6	4	(Italy) Gordon De Adamich	Alfa Romeo 155	2.01.846	TQ
7	51	(Italy) Massimiliano Pezzuto	Peugeot 405	2.02.270	TQ
8	7	(Switzerland) Yolanda Surer	BMW 318iS	2.02.969	TQ
9	52	(Italy) Giambattista Busi	Peugeot 405	2.03.541	TQ
10	58	(Italy) Massimo Pigoli	Alfa Romeo 155	no time	TQ
10	58	(Switzerland) Felipe Ortiz	Alfa Romeo 155	no time	TQ
11	55	(Italy) Moreno Soli	Alfa Romeo 155	2.02.780	
12	66	(Italy) Gianluca Sansoni	Alfa Romeo 155	2.03.034	
13	57	(Italy) Felice Tedeschi	Alfa Romeo 155	2.03.101	
14	69	(Italy) Maurizio Lusuardi	BMW 318iS	2.04.401	
14	69	(Italy) Stefano Gabellini	BMW 318iS	2.04.401	
15	53	(Italy) Raffaele Fortunato	Peugeot 405	2.05.601	
16	63	(Italy) Davide Bernasconi	Alfa Romeo 155	2.06.149	
17	67	(Italy) Lorenzo Falessi	Alfa Romeo 155	2.07.048	
18	61	(Italy) Sergio Sambataro	Opel Vectra GT	2.11.305	
19	56	(Italy) Roberto Colciago	Alfa Romeo 155	2.27.606	

Race 1

Pos	No	Driver	Constructor	Time/Retired	Points
1	1	(Italy) Rinaldo Capello	Audi A4 Quattro	16 laps in 32.09.798	20
2	5	(Venezuela) Johnny Cecotto	BMW 320i	+0.618s	15
3	6	(Italy) Emanuele Naspetti	BMW 320i	+0.989s	12
4	2	(France) Yvan Muller	Audi A4 Quattro	+11.879s	10
5	3	(Italy) Fabrizio Giovanardi	Alfa Romeo 155	+13.353s	8
6	4	(Italy) Gordon De Adamich	Alfa Romeo 155	+1.00.635s	6
7	58	(Italy) Massimo Pigoli	Alfa Romeo 155	+1.13.324s	4
8	7	(Switzerland) Yolanda Surer	BMW 318iS	+1.23.509s	3
9	55	(Italy) Moreno Soli	Alfa Romeo 155	+1.26.710s	2
10	63	(Italy) Davide Bernasconi	Alfa Romeo 155	+1.34.390s	1
11	57	(Italy) Felice Tedeschi	Alfa Romeo 155	+1.36.388s	
12	66	(Italy) Gianluca Sansoni	Alfa Romeo 155	+1.43.361s	
13	67	(Italy) Lorenzo Falessi	Alfa Romeo 155	+1 lap	
14	69	(Italy) Maurizio Lusuardi	BMW 318iS	+1 lap	
15 DNF	56	(Italy) Roberto Colciago	Alfa Romeo 155	+4 laps	
DNF	51	(Italy) Massimiliano Pezzuto	Peugeot 405	+11 laps	
DNF	52	(Italy) Giambattista Busi	Peugeot 405	+13 laps	
DNF	61	(Italy) Sergio Sambataro	Opel Vectra GT	+14 laps	
DNF	53	(Italy) Raffaele Fortunato	Peugeot 405	+15 laps	

Race 2

Pos	No	Driver	Constructor	Time/Retired	Points
1	6	(Italy) Emanuele Naspetti	BMW 320i	16 laps 32:00.388	20
2	1	(Italy) Rinaldo Capello	Audi A4 Quattro	+0.347s	15
3	2	(France) Yvan Muller	Audi A4 Quattro	+6.254s	12
4	3	(Italy) Fabrizio Giovanardi	Alfa Romeo 155	+15.699s	10
5	5	(Venezuela) Johnny Cecotto	BMW 320i	+26.547s	8
6	56	(Italy) Roberto Colciago	Alfa Romeo 155	+48.525s	6
7	4	(Italy) Gordon De Adamich	Alfa Romeo 155	+56.447s	4
8	7	(Switzerland) Yolanda Surer	BMW 318iS	+1.26.190s	3
9	63	(Italy) Davide Bernasconi	Alfa Romeo 155	+1.38.349s	2
10	55	(Italy) Moreno Soli	Alfa Romeo 155	+1.42.917s	1
11	57	(Italy) Felice Tedeschi	Alfa Romeo 155	+1.44.714s	
12	66	(Italy) Gianluca Sansoni	Alfa Romeo 155	+1 lap	
13	69	(Italy) Stefano Gabellini	BMW 318iS	+5 laps	
DNF	61	(Italy) Sergio Sambataro	Opel Vectra GT	+11 laps	
DNF	67	(Italy) Lorenzo Falessi	Alfa Romeo 155	+12 laps	
DNF	58	(Switzerland) Felipe Ortiz	Alfa Romeo 155	+15 laps	
DNS	51	(Italy) Massimiliano Pezzuto	Peugeot 405		
DNS	52	(Italy) Gianbattista Busi	Peugeot 405		
DNS	53	(Italy) Raffaele Fortunato	Peugeot 405		

=== Championship standings after Round 6 ===
Drivers' Championship standings

Pos	Driver	Points
1	(Italy) Rinaldo Capello	177
2	(Venezuela) Johnny Cecotto	139
3	(France) Yvan Muller	131
4	(Italy) Emanuele Naspetti	127
5	(Italy) Fabrizio Giovanardi	120

Constructors' Championship standings

Pos	Constructor	Points
1	(Germany) Audi	344
2	(Germany) BMW	289
3	(Italy) Alfa Romeo	214

== Round 7 (Italy) Pergusa ==
Qualifying

Pos	No	Driver	Car	Lap Time	Top Qualifying
1	6	(Italy) Emanuele Naspetti	BMW 320i	1.44.179	TQ
2	3	(Italy) Fabrizio Giovanardi	Alfa Romeo 155	1.44.319	TQ
3	5	(Venezuela) Johnny Cecotto	BMW 320i	1.44.554	TQ
4	1	(Italy) Rinaldo Capello	Audi A4 Quattro	1.44.615	TQ
5	7	(Italy) Gianni Morbidelli	BMW 320i	1.45.463	TQ
6	2	(France) Yvan Muller	Audi A4 Quattro	1.45.655	TQ
7	57	(Italy) Felice Tedeschi	Alfa Romeo 155	1.51.366	TQ
8	66	(Italy) Gianluca Sansoni	Alfa Romeo 155	1.51.435	TQ
9	55	(Italy) Moreno Soli	Alfa Romeo 155	1.51.613	TQ
10	4	(Italy) Gordon De Adamich	Alfa Romeo 155	no time	TQ

Race 1

Pos	No	Driver	Constructor	Time/Retired	Points
1	6	(Italy) Emanuele Naspetti	BMW 320i	16 laps in 28:22.930	20
2	3	(Italy) Fabrizio Giovanardi	Alfa Romeo 155	+1.882s	15
3	2	(France) Yvan Muller	Audi A4 Quattro	+8.738s	12
4	7	(Italy) Gianni Morbidelli	BMW 320i	+23.159s	10
5	4	(Italy) Gordon De Adamich	Alfa Romeo 155	+1.17.266s	8
6	66	(Italy) Gianluca Sansoni	Alfa Romeo 155	+1.30.224s	6
7	57	(Italy) Felice Tedeschi	Alfa Romeo 155	+1.45.891s	4
8	55	(Italy) Moreno Soli	Alfa Romeo 155	+1.46.035s	3
DSQ	1	(Italy) Rinaldo Capello	Audi A4 Quattro	+12 laps	
DNF	5	(Venezuela) Johnny Cecotto	BMW 320i	+16 laps	

Race 2

Pos	No	Driver	Constructor	Time/Retired	Points
1	6	(Italy) Emanuele Naspetti	BMW 320i	16 laps 28:24.274	20
2	3	(Italy) Fabrizio Giovanardi	Alfa Romeo 155	+14.787s	15
3	1	(Italy) Rinaldo Capello	Audi A4 Quattro	+26.502s	12
4	2	(France) Yvan Muller	Audi A4 Quattro	+26.893s	10
5	05	(Venezuela) Johnny Cecotto	BMW 318iS	+48.580s	8
6	4	(Italy) Gordon De Adamich	Alfa Romeo 155	+1.13.766s	6
7	66	(Italy) Gianluca Sansoni	Alfa Romeo 155	+1.42.162s	4
8	55	(Italy) Moreno Soli	Alfa Romeo 155	+1.47.567s	3
9 DNF	57	(Italy) Felice Tedeschi	Alfa Romeo 155	+6 laps	2
DNF	7	(Italy) Gianni Morbidelli	BMW 320i	+13 laps	

=== Championship standings after Round 7 ===
Drivers' Championship standings

Pos	Driver	Points
1	(Italy) Rinaldo Capello	189
2	(Italy) Emanuele Naspetti	167
3	(France) Yvan Muller	153
4	(Italy) Fabrizio Giovanardi	150
5	(Venezuela) Johnny Cecotto	147

Constructors' Championship standings

Pos	Constructor	Points
1	(Germany) Audi	378
2	(Germany) BMW	347
3	(Italy) Alfa Romeo	258

== Round 8 (Italy) Pergusa ==
Qualifying

Pos	No	Driver	Car	Lap Time	Top Qualifying
1	3	(Italy) Fabrizio Giovanardi	Alfa Romeo 155	1.44.701	TQ
2	7	(Italy) Gianni Morbidelli	BMW 320i	1.44.721	TQ
3	1	(Italy) Rinaldo Capello	Audi A4 Quattro	1.45.204	TQ
4	2	(France) Yvan Muller	Audi A4 Quattro	1.45.884	TQ
5	4	(Italy) Gordon De Adamich	Alfa Romeo 155	1.47.906	TQ
6	58	(Italy) Massimo Pigoli	Alfa Romeo 155	1.50.156	TQ
6	58	(Switzerland) Felipe Ortiz	Alfa Romeo 155	1.50.156	TQ
7	55	(Italy) Moreno Soli	Alfa Romeo 155	1.52.111	TQ
8	63	(Italy) Davide Bernasconi	Alfa Romeo 155	1.52.636	TQ
9	6	(Italy) Emanuele Naspetti	BMW 320i	1.53.411	TQ
10	5	(Venezuela) Johnny Cecotto	BMW 320i	no time	TQ
11	66	(Italy) Gianluca Sansoni	Alfa Romeo 155	1.50.485	
12	57	(Italy) Felice Tedeschi	Alfa Romeo 155	1.50.617	
13	53	(Italy) Raffaele Fortunato	Peugeot 405	1.51.642	
14	69	(Italy) Maurizio Lusuardi	BMW 318iS	1.52.211	
14	69	(Italy) Stefano Gabellini	BMW 318iS	1.52.211	

Race 1

Pos	No	Driver	Constructor	Time/Retired	Points
1	6	(Italy) Emanuele Naspetti	BMW 320i	16 laps in 28:10.995	20
2	5	(Venezuela) Johnny Cecotto	BMW 320i	+4.361s	15
3	7	(Italy) Gianni Morbidelli	BMW 320i	+8.055s	12
4	1	(Italy) Rinaldo Capello	Audi A4 Quattro	+29.953s	10
5	2	(France) Yvan Muller	Audi A4 Quattro	+31.971s	8
6	4	(Italy) Gordon De Adamich	Alfa Romeo 155	+1.17.266s	6
7	58	(Italy) Massimo Pigoli	Alfa Romeo 155	+1.27.146s	4
8	57	(Italy) Felice Tedeschi	Alfa Romeo 155	+1.33.641s	3
9	66	(Italy) Gianluca Sansoni	Alfa Romeo 155	+1.35.116s	2
10	55	(Italy) Moreno Soli	Alfa Romeo 155	+1.46.035s	1
11	69	(Italy) Maurizio Lusuardi	BMW 318iS	+1 lap	
12 DNF	3	(Italy) Fabrizio Giovanardi	Alfa Romeo 155	+7 laps	
DNF	53	(Italy) Raffaele Fortunato	Peugeot 405	+13 laps	
DNF	63	(Italy) Davide Bernasconi	Alfa Romeo 155	+15 laps	

Race 2

Pos	No	Driver	Constructor	Time/Retired	Points
1	6	(Italy) Emanuele Naspetti	BMW 320i	16 laps in 28:19.479	20
2	5	(Venezuela) Johnny Cecotto	BMW 320i	+0.112s	15
3	7	(Italy) Gianni Morbidelli	BMW 320i	+0.500s	12
4	1	(Italy) Rinaldo Capello	Audi A4 Quattro	+1.584s	10
5	3	(Italy) Fabrizio Giovanardi	Alfa Romeo 155	+11.187s	8
6	4	(Italy) Gordon De Adamich	Alfa Romeo 155	+59.070s	6
7	55	(Italy) Moreno Soli	Alfa Romeo 155	+1.29.054s	4
8	66	(Italy) Gianluca Sansoni	Alfa Romeo 155	+1.29.265s	3
9	53	(Italy) Raffaele Fortunato	Peugeot 405	+1 lap	2
10 DNF	57	(Italy) Felice Tedeschi	Alfa Romeo 155	+4 laps	1
DNF	2	(France) Yvan Muller	Audi A4 Quattro	+9 laps	
DNF	58	(Switzerland) Felipe Ortiz	Alfa Romeo 155	+14 laps	
DNS	63	(Italy) Davide Bernasconi	Alfa Romeo 155		

=== Championship standings after Round 8 ===
Drivers' Championship standings

Pos	Driver	Points
1	(Italy) Rinaldo Capello	209
2	(Italy) Emanuele Naspetti	207
3	(Venezuela) Johnny Cecotto	177
4	(France) Yvan Muller	161
5	(Italy) Fabrizio Giovanardi	158

Constructors' Championship standings

Pos	Constructor	Points
1	(Germany) BMW	417
2	(Germany) Audi	406
3	(Italy) Alfa Romeo	282

== Round 9 (Italy) Varano De Melegari ==
Qualifying

Pos	No	Driver	Car	Lap Time	Top Qualifying
1	5	(Venezuela) Johnny Cecotto	BMW 320i	47.985	TQ
2	2	(France) Yvan Muller	Audi A4 Quattro	48.050	TQ
3	1	(Italy) Rinaldo Capello	Audi A4 Quattro	48.243	TQ
4	3	(Italy) Fabrizio Giovanardi	Alfa Romeo 155	48.676	TQ
5	8	(Germany) Frank Biela	Audi A4 Quattro	48.691	TQ
6	60	(Italy) Emanuele Naspetti	BMW 320i	48.808	TQ
7	4	(Italy) Gordon De Adamich	Alfa Romeo 155	49.686	TQ
8	56	(Italy) Roberto Colciago	Alfa Romeo 155	50.109	TQ
9	57	(Italy) Felice Tedeschi	Alfa Romeo 155	51.031	TQ
10	58	(Italy) Massimo Pigoli	Alfa Romeo 155	51.114	TQ
10	58	(Switzerland) Felipe Ortiz	Alfa Romeo 155	51.114	TQ
11	51	(Italy) Massimiliano Pezzuto	Peugeot 405	50.451	
12	55	(Italy) Moreno Soli	Alfa Romeo 155	51.055	
13	54	(Italy) Marco Antonelli	Peugeot 405	51.095	
14	69	(Italy) Maurizio Lusuardi	BMW 318iS	51.370	
14	69	(Italy) Gianpiero Pindari	BMW 318iS	51.370	
15	66	(Italy) Gianluca Sansoni	Alfa Romeo 155	51.495	
16	63	(Italy) Davide Bernasconi	Alfa Romeo 155	51.638	
16	63	(Italy) Augusto Rossetti	Alfa Romeo 155	51.638	
17	61	(Italy) Sergio Sambataro	Opel Vectra GT	51.706	
18	67	(Italy) Lorenzo Falessi	Alfa Romeo 155	55.152	
19	70	(Italy) Gianni Morbidelli	BMW 320i	no time	

Race 1

Pos	No	Driver	Constructor	Time/Retired	Points
1	5	(Venezuela) Johnny Cecotto	BMW 320i	30 laps in 24:57.299	20
2	60	(Italy) Emanuele Naspetti	BMW 320i	+4.512s	15
3	1	(Italy) Rinaldo Capello	Audi A4 Quattro	+17.521s	12
4	8	(Germany) Frank Biela	Audi A4 Quattro	+22.978s	10
5	3	(Italy) Fabrizio Giovanardi	Alfa Romeo 155	+1 lap	8
6	57	(Italy) Felice Tedeschi	Alfa Romeo 155	+1 lap	6
7	58	(Italy) Massimo Pigoli	Alfa Romeo 155	+1 lap	4
8	55	(Italy) Moreno Soli	Alfa Romeo 155	+1 lap	3
9	66	(Italy) Gianluca Sansoni	Alfa Romeo 155	+1 lap	2
10	63	(Italy) Davide Bernasconi	Alfa Romeo 155	+2 laps	1
11	56	(Italy) Roberto Colciago	Alfa Romeo 155	+2 laps	
12	69	(Italy) Maurizio Lusuardi	BMW 318iS	+2 laps	
13	61	(Italy) Sergio Sambataro	Opel Vectra GT	+10 laps	
14	2	(France) Yvan Muller	Audi A4 Quattro	+15 laps	
DSQ	70	(Italy) Gianni Morbidelli	BMW 320i	+1 lap	
DNF	54	(Italy) Marco Antonelli	Peugeot 405	+19 laps	
DNF	4	(Italy) Gordon De Adamich	Alfa Romeo 155	+26 laps	
DNF	67	(Italy) Lorenzo Falessi	Alfa Romeo 155	+29 laps	
DNS	51	(Italy) Massimiliano Pezzuto	Peugeot 405		

Race 2

Pos	No	Driver	Constructor	Time/Retired	Points
1	60	(Italy) Emanuele Naspetti	BMW 320i	30 laps in 24:57.827	20
2	5	(Venezuela) Johnny Cecotto	BMW 320i	+0.401s	15
3	1	(Italy) Rinaldo Capello	Audi A4 Quattro	+1.420s	12
4	2	(France) Yvan Muller	Audi A4 Quattro	+5.039s	10
5	70	(Italy) Gianni Morbidelli	BMW 320i	+10.965s	8
6	3	(Italy) Fabrizio Giovanardi	Alfa Romeo 155	+23.392s	6
7	4	(Italy) Gordon De Adamich	Alfa Romeo 155	+50.248s	4
8	55	(Italy) Moreno Soli	Alfa Romeo 155	+1 lap	3
9	66	(Italy) Gianluca Sansoni	Alfa Romeo 155	+2 laps	2
10	63	(Italy) Augusto Rossetti	Alfa Romeo 155	+2 laps	1
11	54	(Italy) Marco Antonelli	Peugeot 405	+2 laps	
12 DNF	69	(Italy) Gianpiero Pindari	BMW 318iS	+5 laps	
13 DNF	8	(Germany) Frank Biela	Audi A4 Quattro	+13 laps	
DNF	61	(Italy) Sergio Sambataro	Opel Vectra GT	+17 laps	
DNF	51	(Italy) Massimiliano Pezzuto	Peugeot 405	+24 laps	
DNF	57	(Italy) Felice Tedeschi	Alfa Romeo 155	+26 laps	
DNF	58	(Switzerland) Felipe Ortiz	Alfa Romeo 155	+26 laps	
DNF	56	(Italy) Roberto Colciago	Alfa Romeo 155	+26 laps	
DNS	67	(Italy) Lorenzo Falessi	Alfa Romeo 155		

=== Championship standings after Round 9 ===
Drivers' Championship standings

Pos	Driver	Points
1	(Italy) Emanuele Naspetti	242
2	(Italy) Rinaldo Capello	233
3	(Venezuela) Johnny Cecotto	212
4	(Italy) Fabrizio Giovanardi	172
5	(France) Yvan Muller	171

Constructors' Championship standings

Pos	Constructor	Points
1	(Germany) BMW	487
2	(Germany) Audi	450
3	(Italy) Alfa Romeo	304

== Round 10 (Italy) Vallelunga ==
Qualifying

Pos	No	Driver	Car	Lap Time	Top Qualifying
1	12	(Italy) Roberto Ravaglia	BMW 320i	1.15.326	TQ
2	1	(Italy) Rinaldo Capello	Audi A4 Quattro	1.15.349	TQ
3	11	(Italy) Emanuele Pirro	Audi A4 Quattro	1.15.518	TQ
4	15	(Germany) Joachim Winkelhock	BMW 320i	1.15.561	TQ
5	2	(France) Yvan Muller	Audi A4 Quattro	1.15.732	TQ
6	6	(Italy) Emanuele Naspetti	BMW 320i	1.15.734	TQ
7	14	(United Kingdom) Steve Soper	BMW 320i	1.15.833	TQ
8	5	(Venezuela) Johnny Cecotto	BMW 320i	1.15.954	TQ
9	3	(Italy) Fabrizio Giovanardi	Alfa Romeo 155	1.16.110	TQ
10	7	(Italy) Gianni Morbidelli	BMW 320i	1.16.396	TQ
11	9	(Germany) Philipp Peter	Audi A4 Quattro	1.16.303	
12	4	(Italy) Gordon De Adamich	Alfa Romeo 155	1.17.758	
13	56	(Italy) Roberto Colciago	Alfa Romeo 155	1.18.671	
14	84	(Germany) Franz Engstler	Alfa Romeo 155	1.18.695	
15	57	(Italy) Felice Tedeschi	Alfa Romeo 155	1.19.207	
16	66	(Italy) Gianluca Sansoni	Alfa Romeo 155	1.19.689	
17	58	(Italy) Massimo Pigoli	Alfa Romeo 155	1.19.940	
18	83	(Germany) Marco Bromberger	Alfa Romeo 155	1.20.090	
19	55	(Italy) Moreno Soli	Alfa Romeo 155	1.20.335	
20	69	(Italy) Maurizio Lusuardi	BMW 318iS	1.20.693	
21	61	(Italy) Sergio Sambataro	Opel Vectra GT	1.20.984	
22	63	(Italy) Davide Bernasconi	Alfa Romeo 155	1.21.494	
23	82	(Serbia and Montenegro) Milovan Vesnić	Alfa Romeo 155	1.21.836	
24	65	(Italy) Augusto Rossetti	Alfa Romeo 155	1.22.196	
24	65	(Italy) Tarcisio Bernasconi	Alfa Romeo 155	1.22.196	
25	67	(Italy) Lorenzo Falessi	Alfa Romeo 155	1.22.998	
26	62	(Italy) Fabrizio Fede	Opel Vectra GT	1.22.998	
27	54	(Italy) Massimiliano Blancardi	Peugeot 405	1.27.448	

Race 1

Pos	No	Driver	Constructor	Time/Retired	Points
1	5	(Venezuela) Johnny Cecotto	BMW 320i	22 laps in 28:43.023	20
2	1	(Italy) Rinaldo Capello	Audi A4 Quattro	+3.289s	15
3	12	(Italy) Roberto Ravaglia	BMW 320i	+5.045s	12
4	2	(France) Yvan Muller	Audi A4 Quattro	+6.324	10
5	11	(Italy) Emanuele Pirro	Audi A4 Quattro	+12.204s	8
6	6	(Italy) Emanuele Naspetti	BMW 320i	+18.063s	6
7	15	(Germany) Joachim Winkelhock	BMW 320i	+18.780s	4
8	14	(United Kingdom) Steve Soper	BMW 320i	+20.551s	3
9	4	(Italy) Gordon De Adamich	Alfa Romeo 155	+1.05.182s	2
14	84	(Germany) Franz Engstler	Alfa Romeo 155	+1 lap	1
11	56	(Italy) Roberto Colciago	Alfa Romeo 155	+1 lap	
12	61	(Italy) Sergio Sambataro	Opel Vectra GT	+1 lap	
13	66	(Italy) Gianluca Sansoni	Alfa Romeo 155	+1 lap	
14	55	(Italy) Moreno Soli	Alfa Romeo 155	+1 lap	
15	83	(Germany) Marco Bromberger	Alfa Romeo 155	+1 lap	
16	63	(Italy) Davide Bernasconi	Alfa Romeo 155	+1 lap	
17	7	(Italy) Gianni Morbidelli	BMW 320i	+2 laps	
18	54	(Italy) Massimilano Blancardi	Peugeot 405	+2 laps	
19	67	(Italy) Lorenzo Falessi	Alfa Romeo 155	+2 laps	
20 DNF	57	(Italy) Felice Tedeschi	Alfa Romeo 155	+5 laps	
21 DNF	58	(Italy) Massimo Pigoli	Alfa Romeo 155	+7 laps	
22 DNF	62	(Italy) Fabrizio Fede	Opel Vectra GT	+8 laps	
23 DNF	9	(Germany) Philipp Peter	Audi A4 Quattro	+9 laps	
24 DNF	82	(Serbia and Montenegro) Milovan Vesnić	Alfa Romeo 155	+10 laps	
DNF	69	(Italy) Maurizio Lusuardi	BMW 318iS	+12 laps	
DNF	65	(Italy) Augusto Rossetti	Alfa Romeo 155	+20 laps	
DNF	3	(Italy) Fabrizio Giovanardi	Alfa Romeo 155	+21 laps	

Race 2

Pos	No	Driver	Constructor	Time/Retired	Points
1	5	(Venezuela) Johnny Cecotto	BMW 320i	22 laps in 28:44.745	20
2	14	(United Kingdom) Steve Soper	BMW 320i	+0.503s	15
3	1	(Italy) Rinaldo Capello	Audi A4 Quattro	+6.445s	12
4	11	(Italy) Emanuele Pirro	Audi A4 Quattro	+6.683s	10
5	7	(Italy) Gianni Morbidelli	BMW 320i	+7.409s	8
6	2	(France) Yvan Muller	Audi A4 Quattro	+13.162	6
7	6	(Italy) Emanuele Naspetti	BMW 320i	+15.047s	4
8	3	(Italy) Fabrizio Giovanardi	Alfa Romeo 155	+21.711s	3
9	84	(Germany) Franz Engstler	Alfa Romeo 155	+1.17.807s	2
10	83	(Germany) Marco Bromberger	Alfa Romeo 155	+1 lap	1
11	56	(Italy) Roberto Colciago	Alfa Romeo 155	+1 lap	
12	55	(Italy) Moreno Soli	Alfa Romeo 155	+1 lap	
13	69	(Italy) Maurizio Lusuardi	BMW 318iS	+1 lap	
14	66	(Italy) Gianluca Sansoni	Alfa Romeo 155	+1 lap	
15	63	(Italy) Davide Bernasconi	Alfa Romeo 155	+1 lap	
16	67	(Italy) Lorenzo Falessi	Alfa Romeo 155	+2 laps	
17 DNF	15	(Germany) Joachim Winkelhock	BMW 320i	+8 laps	
18 DNF	54	(Italy) Massimilano Blancardi	Peugeot 405	+9 laps	
19 DNF	12	(Italy) Roberto Ravaglia	BMW 320i	+10 laps	
20 DNF	61	(Italy) Sergio Sambataro	Opel Vectra GT	+10 laps	
DNF	9	(Germany) Philipp Peter	Audi A4 Quattro	+13 laps	
DNF	4	(Italy) Gordon De Adamich	Alfa Romeo 155	+15 laps	
DNS	82	(Serbia and Montenegro) Milovan Vesnić	Alfa Romeo 155		
DNS	57	(Italy) Felice Tedeschi	Alfa Romeo 155		
DNS	58	(Italy) Massimo Pigoli	Alfa Romeo 155		
DNS	62	(Italy) Fabrizio Fede	Opel Vectra GT		
DNS	65	(Italy) Tarcisio Bernasconi	Alfa Romeo 155		

=== Championship standings after Round 10 ===
Drivers' Championship standings

Pos	Driver	Points
1	(Italy) Rinaldo Capello	(278) 250 after 4 worse results
2	(Venezuela) Johnny Cecotto	(262) 244 after 4 worse results
3	(Italy) Emanuele Naspetti	(255) 242 after 4 worse results
4	(France) Yvan Muller	(205) 187 after 4 worse results
5	(Italy) Fabrizio Giovanardi	(179) 175 after 4 worse results

Constructors' Championship standings

Pos	Constructor	Points
1	(Germany) BMW	551
2	(Germany) Audi	497
3	(Italy) Alfa Romeo	312

== Championship standings ==
Points system
**1st**	**2nd**	**3rd**	**4th**	**5th**	**6th**	**7th**	**8th**	**9th**	**10th**
20	15	12	10	8	6	4	3	2	1

- 16 results from 20 are valid for the championship
- 8 results from 10 are valid for the championship in the firsts five rounds (Round 1 - Round 5)
- 8 results from 10 are valid for the championship in the seconds five rounds (Round 6 - Round 10)

=== Drivers Championship ===
Pos	Driver	Car	MUG (Italy)		MAG (Italy)		MON (Italy)		BIN (Italy)		MIS (Italy)		IMO (Italy)		PER (Italy)		PER (Italy)		VAR (Italy)		VAL (Italy)		Pts
1	(Italy) Rinaldo Capello	Audi	(5)	(4)	1	**1**	1	**1**	**1**	**1**	3	4	1	**2**	DSQ	3	(4)	4	3	3	2	3	**250** (278)
2	(Venezuela) Johnny Cecotto	BMW	2	3	(4)	DNS	**4**	3	3	2	**1**	**1**	**2**	(5)	Ret	5	2	2	**1**	**2**	1	**1**	**244** (262)
3	(Italy) Emanuele Naspetti	BMW	**3**	2	5	4	(8)	Ret	4	4	2	2	3	1	**1**	**1**	1	**1**	2	1	(6)	(7)	**242** (255)
4	(France) Yvan Muller	Audi	(4)	(5)	**2**	2	2	2	2	3	4	3	4	3	3	4	5	Ret	14	4	4	6	**187** (205)
5	(Italy) Fabrizio Giovanardi	Alfa Romeo	1	**1**	3	3	3	4	5	(7)	5	11	5	4	2	2	**Ret**	5	5	6	Ret	8	**175** (179)
6	(Italy) Roberto Colciago	Alfa Romeo	(6)	6	6	5	5	5	Ret	5	6	5	15	6					11	Ret	11	11	**64** (70)
7	(Italy) Gordon de Adamich	Alfa Romeo			7	6	Ret	DNS	NC	Ret	8	6	6	7	5	6	6	6	Ret	7	9	Ret	**61**
8	(Italy) Gianni Morbidelli	BMW													4	Ret	3	3	DSQ	5	17	5	**50**
9	(Italy) Massimo Pigoli	Alfa Romeo	7	Ret	8	7	9	Ret	7	8	7	Ret	7				7		7		21	DNS	**36**
10	(Italy) Moreno Soli	Alfa Romeo	11	10	10	8	14	8	Ret	12	16	14	9	10	8	8	10	7	8	8	14	12	**28**
11	(Italy) Massimiliano Pezzuto	Peugeot	10	9	9	9	11	Ret	6	6	10	8	Ret	Ret					DNS	Ret			**23**
12	(Switzerland) Yolanda Surer	BMW	Ret	DNS	13	10	7	Ret	8	9	9	7	8	8									**22**
13	(Italy) Gianluca Sansoni	Alfa Romeo											12	12	6	7	9	8	9	9	13	14	**19**
14	(United Kingdom) Steve Soper	BMW																			8	2	**18**
15	(Italy) Emanuele Pirro	Audi																			5	4	**18**
16	(Italy) Marco Brand	Opel	Ret	7	Ret	DNS	6	6															**16**
17	(Italy) Felice Tedeschi	Alfa Romeo					15	Ret	Ret	Ret	11	Ret	11	11	7	Ret	8	Ret	6	Ret	20	DNS	**13**
18	(Italy) Roberto Ravaglia	BMW																			**3**	19	**12**
19	(Italy) Davide Bernasconi	Alfa Romeo	8	8	11	Ret	10	Ret	11	11	12		10	9			Ret	Ret	10		16	15	**11**
20	(Germany) Frank Biela	Audi																	4	13			**10**
21	(Italy) Raffaele Fortunato	Peugeot	12	Ret	14	11	12	Ret	10	10	13	9	Ret	Ret			Ret	9					**6**
22	(Italy) Sergio Sambataro	Opel	Ret	DNS	Ret	Ret	13	7			15	15	Ret	Ret					13	Ret	12	20	**4**
23	(Germany) Joachim Winkelhock	BMW																			7	17	**4**
24	(Germany) Franz Engstler	Alfa Romeo																			10	9	**3**
25	(Italy) Alessandro Gabrielli	Alfa Romeo	Ret	DNS	12	12	16	9															**2**
26	(Italy) Giambattista Busi	Peugeot	9	DNS							Ret	Ret	Ret	Ret									**2**
27	(Italy) Giampaolo Vicarelli	Peugeot							9	Ret													**2**
28	(Italy) Stefano Gabellini	BMW						10				13		13				10					**2**
29	(Italy) Augusto Rossetti	Alfa Romeo										12								10	Ret		**1**
30	(Germany) Marco Bromberger	Alfa Romeo																			15	10	**1**
31	(Czech Republic) Miloš Tesar	BMW									Ret	10											**1**
	(Italy) Maurizio Lusuardi	BMW					Ret				14		14				11		12		Ret	13	**0**
	(Italy) Marco Antonelli	Peugeot																	Ret	11			**0**
	(Italy) Giampaolo Pindari	BMW																		12			**0**
	(Italy) Lorenzo Falessi	Alfa Romeo									17	Ret	13	Ret					Ret	DNS	19	16	**0**
	(Italy) Luigi Moccia	Peugeot	13	DNS																			**0**
	(Italy) Massimiliano Blancardi	Peugeot																			18	18	**0**
	(Italy) Fabrizio Fede	Opel																			22	DNS	**0**
	(Austria) Philipp Peter	Audi																			23	Ret	**0**
	(Serbia and Montenegro) Milovan Vesnić	Alfa Romeo																			24	DNS	**0**
	(Switzerland) Felipe Ortiz	Alfa Romeo												Ret				Ret		Ret			**0**
	(Italy) Gianluca de Lorenzi	Peugeot									Ret	Ret											**0**
	(Italy) Alessandro Belloni	Peugeot					Ret	DNS															**0**
	(Italy) Tarcisio Bernasconi	Alfa Romeo																				DNS	**0**
Pos	Driver	Car	MUG (Italy)		MAG (Italy)		MON (Italy)		BIN (Italy)		MIS (Italy)		IMO (Italy)		PER (Italy)		PER (Italy)		VAR (Italy)		VAL (Italy)		Pts

Colour	Result
Gold	Winner
Silver	Second place
Bronze	Third place
Green	Points classification
Blue	Non-points classification
Blue	Non-classified finish (NC)
Purple	Retired, not classified (Ret)
Red	Did not qualify (DNQ)
Red	Did not pre-qualify (DNPQ)
Black	Disqualified (DSQ)
White	Did not start (DNS)
White	Withdrew (WD)
White	Race cancelled (C)
Blank	Did not practice (DNP)
Blank	Did not arrive (DNA)
Blank	Excluded (EX)

**Bold** – Pole
Italics – Fastest Lap

=== Manufacturers' Trophy ===
Pos	Manufacturer	MUG (Italy)		MAG (Italy)		MON (Italy)		BIN (Italy)		MIS (Italy)		IMO (Italy)		PER (Italy)		PER (Italy)		VAR (Italy)		VAL (Italy)		Pts
1	(Germany) BMW	2	3	4	10	4	3	3	2	1	1	2	5	4	5	2	2	1	2	1	1	551
1	(Germany) BMW	3	2	5	4	6	8	4	4	2	2	3	1	1	1	1	1	2	1	3	2	551
2	(Germany) Audi	5	4	1	1	1	1	1	1	3	4	1	2	DSQ	3	4	4	3	3	2	3	497
2	(Germany) Audi	4	5	2	2	2	2	2	3	4	3	4	3	3	4	5	Ret	4	4	4	4	497
3	(Italy) Alfa Romeo	1	1	3	3	3	4	5	5	5	5	5	4	2	2	6	5	5	6	9	8	312
3	(Italy) Alfa Romeo	6	6	6	5	5	5	6	6	6	6	6	6	5	6	7	6	7	7	10	9	312

Colour	Result
Gold	Winner
Silver	Second place
Bronze	Third place
Green	Points classification
Blue	Non-points classification
Blue	Non-classified finish (NC)
Purple	Retired, not classified (Ret)
Red	Did not qualify (DNQ)
Red	Did not pre-qualify (DNPQ)
Black	Disqualified (DSQ)
White	Did not start (DNS)
White	Withdrew (WD)
White	Race cancelled (C)
Blank	Did not practice (DNP)
Blank	Did not arrive (DNA)
Blank	Excluded (EX)

=== Privateers' Certina Trophy ===
- 16 results from 20 are valid for the championship
- 8 results from 10 are valid for the championship in the firsts five rounds (Round 1 - Round 5)
- 8 results from 10 are valid for the championship in the seconds five rounds (Round 6 - Round 10)

Pos	Driver	Car	MUG (Italy)		MAG (Italy)		MON (Italy)		BIN (Italy)		MIS (Italy)		IMO (Italy)		PER (Italy)		PER (Italy)		VAR (Italy)		VAL (Italy)		Pts
1	(Italy) Roberto Colciago	Alfa Romeo	1	1	1	1	1	1		1	1	(1)	8	1					6		2	3	**216** (236)
2	(Italy) Moreno Soli	Alfa Romeo	6	5	4	3	(8)	4	6	6	(9)	7	2	3	3	2	4	1	3	1	(5)	(4)	**178** (201)
3	(Italy) Massimo Pigoli	Alfa Romeo	2		2	2	3		2	3	2		1				1		2				**154**
4	(Italy) Gianluca Sansoni	Alfa Romeo											(5)	5	1	1	3	2	4	2	4	(6)	**110** (124)
5	(Italy) Davide Bernasconi	Alfa Romeo	3	3	5		4		5	5	5		3	2					5		7	7	**109**
6	(Italy) Massimiliano Pezzuto	Peugeot	(5)	4	3	4	5	1	2	3	2												**102** (110)
7	(Italy) Felice Tedeschi	Alfa Romeo					9				4		4	4	2		2	5	1		10		**91**
8	(Italy) Raffaele Fortunato	Peugeot	(7)	6	7	5	6		4	4	6	3						3					**74** (78)
9	(Italy) Marco Brand	Opel		2			2	2															**45**
10	(Germany) Franz Engstler	Alfa Romeo																			1	1	**40**
11	(Italy) Sergio Sambataro	Opel					7	3			8										3		**31**
12	(Italy) Maurizio Lusuardi	BMW									7		7				5		7			5	**28**
13	(Italy) Stefano Gabellini	BMW						6				6						4					**22**
14	(Germany) Marco Bromberger	Alfa Romeo																			6	2	**21**
15	(Italy) Alessandro Gabrielli	Alfa Romeo			6	6	10	5															**21**
16	(Italy) Augusto Rossetti	Alfa Romeo												5						3			**20**
17	(Italy) Lorenzo Falessi	Alfa Romeo									10		6								9	8	**12**
18	(Italy) Giampaolo Vicarelli	Peugeot							3														**12**
19	(Italy) Giambattista Busi	Peugeot	4																				**10**
20	(Italy) Marco Antonelli	Peugeot																		4			**10**
21	(Czech Republic) Miloš Tesar	BMW										4											**10**
22	(Italy) Giampiero Pindari	BMW																		5			**8**
23	(Italy) Massimiliano Blancardi	Peugeot																			8		**3**
24	(Italy) Luigi Moccia	Peugeot	8																				**3**
	(Italy) Fabrizio Fede	Opel																					0
	(Serbia and Montenegro) Milovan Vesnić	Alfa Romeo																					0
	(Switzerland) Felipe Ortiz	Alfa Romeo																					0
	(Italy) Gianluca de Lorenzi	Peugeot																					0
	(Italy) Alessandro Belloni	Peugeot																					0
	(Italy) Tarcisio Bernasconi	Alfa Romeo																					0
