= Mutsuaki Sanada =

Japanese racing driver (1942–2020)

- Born: 2 May 1942
- Died: 1 May 2020 (aged 77)
- Occupation: Racing driver

Mutsuaki Sanada (Shinjitai: 眞田 睦明, born 2 May 1942 – 1 May 2020) was a Japanese racing driver.

== Racing record ==
=== Japanese Top Formula Championship results ===
(key) (Races in bold indicate pole position) (Races in italics indicate fastest lap)

Year	Entrant	1	2	3	4	5	6	7	8	9	DC	Points
1987	dp Motorsport	SUZ; 11	FUJ; 15	MIN; 13	SUZ; Ret	SUZ; 13	SUG; 12	FUJ; 13	SUZ	SUZ	NC	0
