= 2006 Japan Le Mans Challenge =

Seasons
- ← none 2007 →

The 2006 Japan Le Mans Challenge was the inaugural season of the Japan Le Mans Challenge, a series created by SERO, and run under sanctioning from the ACO, to follow 24 Hours of Le Mans rules. It began at Sportsland SUGO on May 14 and ended at Okayama International Circuit on October 29, after three races.

The series was open to Le Mans Prototypes, divided into the LMP1 and LMP2 classes, and grand tourer-style racing cars in the GT1 and GT2 classes.

== 2006 Pre-season ==
In the buildup to the first season of JLMC, it was apparent from the start that unlike the Le Mans Series in Europe, JLMC would not start off with great success.

A lack of commitment from major Japanese teams, especially those involved in Super GT, meant that the entry list for the season was small.

An official pre-season test at Sportsland Sugo saw only 8 cars showing up. Even with this, more teams promised to eventually make it to the JLMC grid, including Team Goh, who had earned fame when they won the 2005 24 Hours of Le Mans with the conquering Audi R8.

However, of the teams that did show up, few had quality machinery. The entire LMP2 class was small sportscars that did not actually fit LMP2 regulations. LMP1 was able to boast some machinery that fit LMP rules with a Zytek 05S while there was promise of a new Courage LC70 for Mugen Motorsports on the way as the season went on.

GT classes was made up of a large amount of machinery from Super GT, with an ex-Prodrive Ferrari 550-GTS Maranello and JLOC's Super GT Lamborghini Murcielago RG-1 joined by a privateer Mosler MT900R in GT1.

GT2 was also only able to claim a few competitive entries, with some two Porsche 911 GT3s being mixed with a privateer cars that did not fully reach ACO GT2 specs.

These competitors allowed for the entry list of a mere 12 competitors for the first round at Sportsland Sugo.

== Schedule ==
Rnd.	Race	Circuit	Date
1	Sportsland Sugo 1000 km	(Miyagi Prefecture) Sportsland SUGO	May 14
2	Motegi 1000 km	(Tochigi Prefecture) Twin Ring Motegi	July 2
3	Okayama 1000 km	(Okayama Prefecture) Okayama International Circuit	October 29

== Entries ==
=== LMP1 ===
Team	Chassis	Engine	Tyres	No.	Drivers	Rounds
(Japan) Team Mugen	Courage LC70	Mugen MF458S 4.5 L V8	M	16	(Japan) Seiji Ara	2–3
(Japan) Team Mugen	Courage LC70	Mugen MF458S 4.5 L V8	M	16	(Japan) Haruki Kurosawa	2–3
(Japan) Hitotsuyama Racing	Zytek 05S	Zytek ZB408 4.0 L V8	D	21	(Japan) Hiroki Katoh	All
(Japan) Hitotsuyama Racing	Zytek 05S	Zytek ZB408 4.0 L V8	D	21	(Japan) Hideki Noda	All
(Japan) Jidousya Koubou Myst	Oscar SK5.2	Toyota ?	D	65	(Japan) Toshiya Itou	3
(Japan) Jidousya Koubou Myst	Oscar SK5.2	Toyota ?	D	65	(Japan) Tomoyuki Kawasaki	3
(Japan) Jidousya Koubou Myst	Oscar SK5.2	Toyota ?	D	65	(Japan) Tatsuya Mizutani	3
(Japan) Jidousya Koubou Myst	Oscar SK93	Mazda 13B 1.3 L 3-Rotor	Y	66	(Japan) Takahiko Shimazawa	All
(Japan) Jidousya Koubou Myst	Oscar SK93	Mazda 13B 1.3 L 3-Rotor	Y	66	(Japan) Kenji Takeya	1–2
(Japan) Jidousya Koubou Myst	Oscar SK93	Mazda 13B 1.3 L 3-Rotor	Y	66	(Japan) Hiroshi Ota	2–3
(Japan) Jidousya Koubou Myst	Oscar SK93	Mazda 13B 1.3 L 3-Rotor	Y	66	(Japan) Masaya Kono	1
(Japan) Jidousya Koubou Myst	Oscar SK93	Mazda 13B 1.3 L 3-Rotor	Y	66	(Japan) Kazuya Murase	3
(Japan) Jidousya Koubou Myst	Oscar SK93	Toyota ?	D	111	(Japan) Tatsuya Hashimoto	3
(Japan) Jidousya Koubou Myst	Oscar SK93	Toyota ?	D	111	(Japan) Kota Sasaki	3
(Japan) Jidousya Koubou Myst	Oscar SK93	Toyota ?	D	111	(Japan) Yasumasa Wakahara	3

=== LMP2 ===
Team	Chassis	Engine	Tyres	No.	Drivers	Rounds
(Japan) MYZ	Dallara GC21	Toyota 3S-GTE 2.0 L I4	B	3	(Japan) Syougo Suhou	All
(Japan) MYZ	Dallara GC21	Toyota 3S-GTE 2.0 L I4	B	3	(Japan) Masayuki Yamamoto	All
(Japan) MYZ	Dallara GC21	Toyota 3S-GTE 2.0 L I4	B	3	(Japan) Junichiro Yamashita	All
(Japan) MYZ	Dallara GC21	Toyota 3S-GTE 2.0 L I4	B	4	(Japan) Tomonobu Fujii	All
(Japan) MYZ	Dallara GC21	Toyota 3S-GTE 2.0 L I4	B	4	(Japan) Yuuya Sakamoto	All
(Japan) MYZ	Dallara GC21	Toyota 3S-GTE 2.0 L I4	B	4	(Japan) Yoshihisa Namekata	All
(Japan) Jidousya Koubou Myst	Oscar SK5.2 1–2; Oscar RS.KK-LM 3	Toyota 3S-GTE 2.0 L I4	Y	15	(Japan) Ryohei Sakaguchi	All
(Japan) Jidousya Koubou Myst	Oscar SK5.2 1–2; Oscar RS.KK-LM 3	Toyota 3S-GTE 2.0 L I4	Y	15	(Japan) Masayuki Ueda	All
(Japan) Jidousya Koubou Myst	Oscar SK5.2 1–2; Oscar RS.KK-LM 3	Toyota 3S-GTE 2.0 L I4	Y	15	(Japan) Motoaki Ishikawa	2–3
(Japan) Jidousya Koubou Myst	Oscar SK5.2	Toyota ?	Y	52	(Japan) Masayoshi Furuya	3
(Japan) Jidousya Koubou Myst	Oscar SK5.2	Toyota ?	Y	52	(Japan) Hisashi Tsukahara	3
(Japan) Jidousya Koubou Myst	Oscar SK5.2	Toyota ?	Y	52	(Japan) Tomokuni Waki	3
(Japan) Aim Sports	Dallara GC21	Toyota 3S-GTE 2.0 L I4	Y	18	(Japan) Yuuji Asou	All
(Japan) Aim Sports	Dallara GC21	Toyota 3S-GTE 2.0 L I4	Y	18	(Japan) Masaru Tomizawa	All
(Japan) Aim Sports	Dallara GC21	Toyota 3S-GTE 2.0 L I4	Y	18	(Japan) Shinsuke Yamazaki	All
(Japan) Cosmos Racing	Oscar SK5.2	Toyota ?	D	37	(Japan) Takuya Andou	3
(Japan) Cosmos Racing	Oscar SK5.2	Toyota ?	D	37	(Japan) Naoto Chikada	3
(Japan) Cosmos Racing	Oscar SK5.2	Toyota ?	D	37	(Japan) Youichirou Suzuki	3

=== LMGT1 ===
Team	Chassis	Engine	Tyres	No.	Drivers	Rounds
(Japan) Team LeyJun	Mosler MT900R	Chevrolet LS1 6.0 L V8	Y	9	(Japan) Hiroya Iijima	All
(Japan) Team LeyJun	Mosler MT900R	Chevrolet LS1 6.0 L V8	Y	9	(Japan) Osamu Nakajima	All
(Japan) Team LeyJun	Mosler MT900R	Chevrolet LS1 6.0 L V8	Y	9	(Japan) Masaki Tanaka	All
(Japan) Hitotsuyama Racing	Ferrari 550-GTS Maranello	Ferrari F133 A 6.0 L V12	D	20	(Japan) Naoki Hattori	All
(Japan) Hitotsuyama Racing	Ferrari 550-GTS Maranello	Ferrari F133 A 6.0 L V12	D	20	(Japan) Tatsuya Kataoka	All
(Japan) Hitotsuyama Racing	Ferrari 550-GTS Maranello	Ferrari F133 A 6.0 L V12	D	20	(Japan) Eiichi Tajima	All
(Japan) JLOC	Lamborghini Murcielago RG-1	Lamborghini L535 6.0 L V12	Y	88	(Japan) Yasutaka Hinoi	1, 3
(Japan) JLOC	Lamborghini Murcielago RG-1	Lamborghini L535 6.0 L V12	Y	88	(Japan) Hisashi Wada	1, 3
(Japan) JLOC	Lamborghini Murcielago RG-1	Lamborghini L535 6.0 L V12	Y	88	(Japan) Koji Yamanishi	1, 3

=== LMGT2 ===
Team	Chassis	Engine	Tyres	No.	Drivers	Rounds
(Japan) Team Takamizawa	Porsche 996 GT3-RS	Porsche M96/77 3.8 L Flat-6	Y	5	(Japan) Tomohiko Sunako	All
(Japan) Team Takamizawa	Porsche 996 GT3-RS	Porsche M96/77 3.8 L Flat-6	Y	5	(Japan) Kazuyoshi Takamizawa	All
(Japan) Team Takamizawa	Porsche 996 GT3-RS	Porsche M96/77 3.8 L Flat-6	Y	5	(Japan) Akihiko Tsutsumi	1–2
(Japan) Team Takamizawa	Porsche 996 GT3-RS	Porsche M96/77 3.8 L Flat-6	Y	5	(Japan) Akazama Oyaji	3
(Japan) Proto Works	Mazda RX-7	Mazda 20B 2.0 L 3-Rotor	Y	7	(Japan) Naoko Hagiwara	All
(Japan) Proto Works	Mazda RX-7	Mazda 20B 2.0 L 3-Rotor	Y	7	(Japan) Yuuki Kawai	1
(Japan) Proto Works	Mazda RX-7	Mazda 20B 2.0 L 3-Rotor	Y	7	(Japan) Atsuko Oomura	2
(Japan) Proto Works	Mazda RX-7	Mazda 20B 2.0 L 3-Rotor	Y	7	(Japan) Sakiko Tsuji	3
(Japan) Proto Works	Porsche 996 GT3-RS	Porsche M96/77 3.8 L Flat-6	D	77	(Japan) "Dragon"	3
(Japan) Proto Works	Porsche 996 GT3-RS	Porsche M96/77 3.8 L Flat-6	D	77	(Japan) Yoshiaki Nakayama	3
(Japan) Proto Works	Porsche 996 GT3-RS	Porsche M96/77 3.8 L Flat-6	D	77	(Japan) Motoyoshi Yoshida	3
(Japan) Team NRF	Mazda RX-8	Mazda 13B-MSP 1.3 L 2-Rotor	Y	8	(Japan) Jun Nakamura	3
(Japan) Team NRF	Mazda RX-8	Mazda 13B-MSP 1.3 L 2-Rotor	Y	8	(Japan) Fumihiko Nishida	3
(Japan) Team NRF	Mazda RX-8	Mazda 13B-MSP 1.3 L 2-Rotor	Y	8	(Japan) Ryuuichirou Ootsuka	3
(Japan) Team Nopro	Mazda Roadster	Mazda BP 1.8 L I4	D	17	(Japan) Toshihiko Nogami	2
(Japan) Team Nopro	Mazda Roadster	Mazda BP 1.8 L I4	D	17	(Japan) Yutaka Seki	2
(Japan) Team Kawamura	Porsche 996 GT3-RSR	Porsche M96/79 3.8 L Flat-6	Y	27	(Japan) Kouji Aoyama	All
(Japan) Team Kawamura	Porsche 996 GT3-RSR	Porsche M96/79 3.8 L Flat-6	Y	27	(Japan) Morio Nitta	All
(Japan) Team Kawamura	Porsche 996 GT3-RSR	Porsche M96/79 3.8 L Flat-6	Y	27	(Japan) Shinichi Takagi	All
(Japan) Sunburst Rush	Porsche 964	Porsche M64/03 3.6 L Flat-6	Y	930	(Japan) Takeshi Inui	3
(Japan) Sunburst Rush	Porsche 964	Porsche M64/03 3.6 L Flat-6	Y	930	(Japan) Hitoshi Kakiuchi	3
(Japan) Sunburst Rush	Porsche 964	Porsche M64/03 3.6 L Flat-6	Y	930	(Japan) Yutaka Matsushima	3

== Race results ==
Bold indicates overall winners.

Rnd	Circuit	LMP1 Winning Team	LMP2 Winning Team	LMGT1 Winning Team	LMGT2 Winning Team
Rnd	Circuit	LMP1 Winning Drivers	LMP2 Winning Drivers	LMGT1 Winning Drivers	LMGT2 Winning Drivers
1	Sugo	(Japan) #66 Jidousya Koubou Myst	(Japan) #18 Aim Sports	**(Japan) #20 Hitotsuyama Racing**	(Japan) #27 Team Kawamura
1	Sugo	(Japan) Takahiko Shimazawa (Japan) Masaya Kono (Japan) Kenji Takeya	(Japan) Shinsuke Yamakazi (Japan) Yuji Aso (Japan) Masaru Tomizawa	**(Japan) Tatsuya Kataoka** **(Japan) Naoki Hattori** **(Japan) Eiichi Tajima**	(Japan) Koji Aoyama (Japan) Shinichi Takagi (Japan) Morio Nitta
2	Motegi	(Japan) #66 Jidousya Koubou Myst	(Japan) #4 MYZ	**(Japan) #20 Hitotsuyama Racing**	(Japan) #27 Team Kawamura
2	Motegi	(Japan) Takahiki Shimazawa (Japan) Hiroshi Ohta (Japan) Kenji Takeya	(Japan) Yuya Sakamoto (Japan) Yoshihisa Namekata (Japan) Tomonobu Fujii	**(Japan) Tatsuya Kataoka** **(Japan) Naoki Hattori** **(Japan) Eiichi Tajima**	(Japan) Koji Aoyama (Japan) Shinichi Takagi (Japan) Morio Nitta
3	Okayama	**(Japan) #16 Team Mugen**	(Japan) #4 MYZ	(Japan) #88 JLOC	(Japan) #930 Sunburst Rush
3	Okayama	**(Japan) Seiji Ara** **(Japan) Haruki Kurosawa**	(Japan) Yuya Sakamoto (Japan) Yoshihisa Namekata (Japan) Tomonobu Fujii	(Japan) Koji Yamanishi (Japan) Yasatuka Hinoi (Japan) Wada-Q	(Japan) Yutaka Matsushima (Japan) Takeshi Inui (Japan) Masashi Kakuichi

== Championship standings ==
=== Points system ===
Points are awarded to finishers based on how many cars were entered in each class. For team's championships, only the top finishing car in a team scores points towards the championship. For classes with a more than five cars, points are scored as follows:

Position	1st	2nd	3rd	4th	5th	6th	7th	8th
Points	10	8	6	5	4	3	2	1

For classes with a fewer than five cars, points are scored as follows:

Position	1st	2nd	3rd	4th	5th
Points	5	4	3	2.5	2

=== Drivers' Championship ===
==== LMP1 standings ====
Pos.	Drivers	Team	SUG	MOT	OKA	Points
1	(Japan) Takahiko Shimazawa	(Japan) Jidousya Koubou Myst	1	1	4	12.5
2	(Japan) Kenji Takeya	(Japan) Jidousya Koubou Myst	1	1		10
3	(Japan) Hiroshi Ohta	(Japan) Jidousya Koubou Myst		1	4	7.5
4	(Japan) Seiji Ara (Japan) Haruki Kurosawa	(Japan) Team Mugen		NC	1	5
5	(Japan) Masaya Kono	(Japan) Jidousya Koubou Myst	1			5
6	(Japan) Hiroki Katoh (Japan) Hideki Noda	(Japan) Hitotsuyama Racing	**Ret**	**Ret**	**2**	4
7	(Japan) Tatsuya Hashimoto (Japan) Kota Sasaki (Japan) Yasumasa Wakahara	(Japan) Jidousya Koubou Myst			3	3
8	(Japan) Kazuya Murase	(Japan) Jidousya Koubou Myst			4	2.5
9	(Japan) Toshiya Itou (Japan) Tomoyuki Kawasaki (Japan) Tatsuya Mizutani	(Japan) Jidousya Koubou Myst			5	2

Colour	Result
Gold	Winner
Silver	Second place
Bronze	Third place
Green	Points classification
Blue	Non-points classification
Blue	Non-classified finish (NC)
Purple	Retired, not classified (Ret)
Red	Did not qualify (DNQ)
Red	Did not pre-qualify (DNPQ)
Black	Disqualified (DSQ)
White	Did not start (DNS)
White	Withdrew (WD)
White	Race cancelled (C)
Blank	Did not practice (DNP)
Blank	Did not arrive (DNA)
Blank	Excluded (EX)

**Bold** – Pole
Italic – Fastest Lap

==== LMP2 standings ====
Pos.	Drivers	Team	SUG	MOT	OKA	Points
1	(Japan) Yuya Sakamoto (Japan) Yoshihisa Namekata (Japan) Tomonobu Fujii	(Japan) MYZ	**NC**	1	1	15
2	(Japan) Tomokuni Waki (Japan) Masayoshi Furuya (Japan) Hisashi Tsukahara	(Japan) Jidousya Koubou Myst			2	8
3	(Japan) Shinsuke Yamazaki (Japan) Yuji Aso (Japan) Masaru Tomizawa	(Japan) Aim Sports	1	**Ret**	Ret	5
4	(Japan) Syougo Suhou (Japan) Masayuki Yamamoto (Japan) Junichiro Yamashita	(Japan) MYZ	Ret	2	Ret	4
5	(Japan) Ryohei Sakaguchi (Japan) Masayuki Ueda	(Japan) Jidousya Koubou Myst	2	Ret	**NC**	4
NC	(Japan) Motoaki Ishikawa	(Japan) Jidousya Koubou Myst		Ret	**NC**	0
NC	(Japan) Takuya Andou (Japan) Naoto Chikada (Japan) Youichirou Suzuki	(Japan) Cosmos Racing			NC	0

==== LMGT1 standings ====
Pos.	Drivers	Team	SUG	MOT	OKA	Points
1	(Japan) Tatsuya Kataoka (Japan) Naoki Hattori (Japan) Eiichi Tajima	(Japan) Hitotsuyama Racing	**1**	**1**	3	13
2	(Japan) Osamu Nakajima (Japan) Masaki Tanaka (Japan) Hiroya Iijima	(Japan) Team Leyjun	2	2	2	12
3	(Japan) Koji Yamanishi (Japan) Yasutaka Hinoi (Japan) Hisashi Wada	(Japan) JLOC	Ret		**1**	5

==== LMGT2 standings ====
Pos.	Drivers	Team	SUG	MOT	OKA	Points
1	(Japan) Koji Aoyama (Japan) Shinichi Takagi (Japan) Morio Nitta	(Japan) Team Kawamura	**1**	**1**	**2**	18
2	(Japan) Yutaka Matsushima (Japan) Masashi Kakiuchi (Japan) Takeshi Inui	(Japan) Sunburst Rush			1	10
3	(Japan) Kazuyoshi Takamizawa (Japan) Tomohiko Sunako	(Japan) Team Takamizawa	2	2	Ret	8
3	(Japan) Akihiko Tsutsumi	(Japan) Team Takamizawa	2	2		8
4	(Japan) "Dragon" (Japan) Yoshiaki Nakayama (Japan) Motoyoshi Yoshida	(Japan) Proto Works			3	6
5	(Japan) Naoko Hagiwara	(Japan) Proto Works	3	3	NC	6
6	(Japan) Yuuki Kawai	(Japan) Proto Works	3			3
7	(Japan) Atsuko Oomura	(Japan) Proto Works		3		3
NC	(Japan) Sakiko Tsuji	(Japan) Proto Works			NC	0
NC	(Japan) Akazama Oyaji	(Japan) Team Takamizawa			Ret	0
NC	(Japan) Jun Nakamura (Japan) Fumihiko Nishida (Japan) Ryuuichirou Ootsuka	(Japan) Team NRF			Ret	0
NC	(Japan) Toshihiko Nogami (Japan) Yutaka Seki	(Japan) Team Nopro		DNQ		0

=== Teams' Championship ===
==== LMP1 standings ====
Pos.	Team	SUG	MOT	OKA	Points
1	(Japan) Jidousya Koubou Myst	1	1	3	13
2	(Japan) Team Mugen		NC	1	5
3	(Japan) Hitotsuyama Racing	**Ret**	**Ret**	**2**	4

Colour	Result
Gold	Winner
Silver	Second place
Bronze	Third place
Green	Points classification
Blue	Non-points classification
Blue	Non-classified finish (NC)
Purple	Retired, not classified (Ret)
Red	Did not qualify (DNQ)
Red	Did not pre-qualify (DNPQ)
Black	Disqualified (DSQ)
White	Did not start (DNS)
White	Withdrew (WD)
White	Race cancelled (C)
Blank	Did not practice (DNP)
Blank	Did not arrive (DNA)
Blank	Excluded (EX)

**Bold** – Pole
Italic – Fastest Lap

==== LMP2 standings ====
Pos.	Team	SUG	MOT	OKA	Points
1	(Japan) MYZ	**NC**	1	1	15
2	(Japan) Jidousya Koubou Myst	2	Ret	**2**	12
3	(Japan) AIM Sports	1	**Ret**	Ret	5
NC	(Japan) Cosmos Racing			NC	0

==== LMGT1 standings ====
Pos.	Team	SUG	MOT	OKA	Points
1	(Japan) Hitotsuyama Racing	**1**	**1**	3	13
2	(Japan) Team LeyJun	2	2	2	12
3	(Japan) JLOC	Ret		**1**	5

==== LMGT2 standings ====
Pos.	Team	SUG	MOT	OKA	Points
1	(Japan) Team Kawamura	**1**	**1**	**2**	18
2	(Japan) Proto Works	3	3	3	12
3	(Japan) Sunburst Rush			1	10
4	(Japan) Team Takamizawa	2	2	Ret	8
NC	(Japan) Team NRF			Ret	0
NC	(Japan) Team Nopro		DNQ		0
