= Haruki Kurosawa =

Japanese racing driver (born 1977)

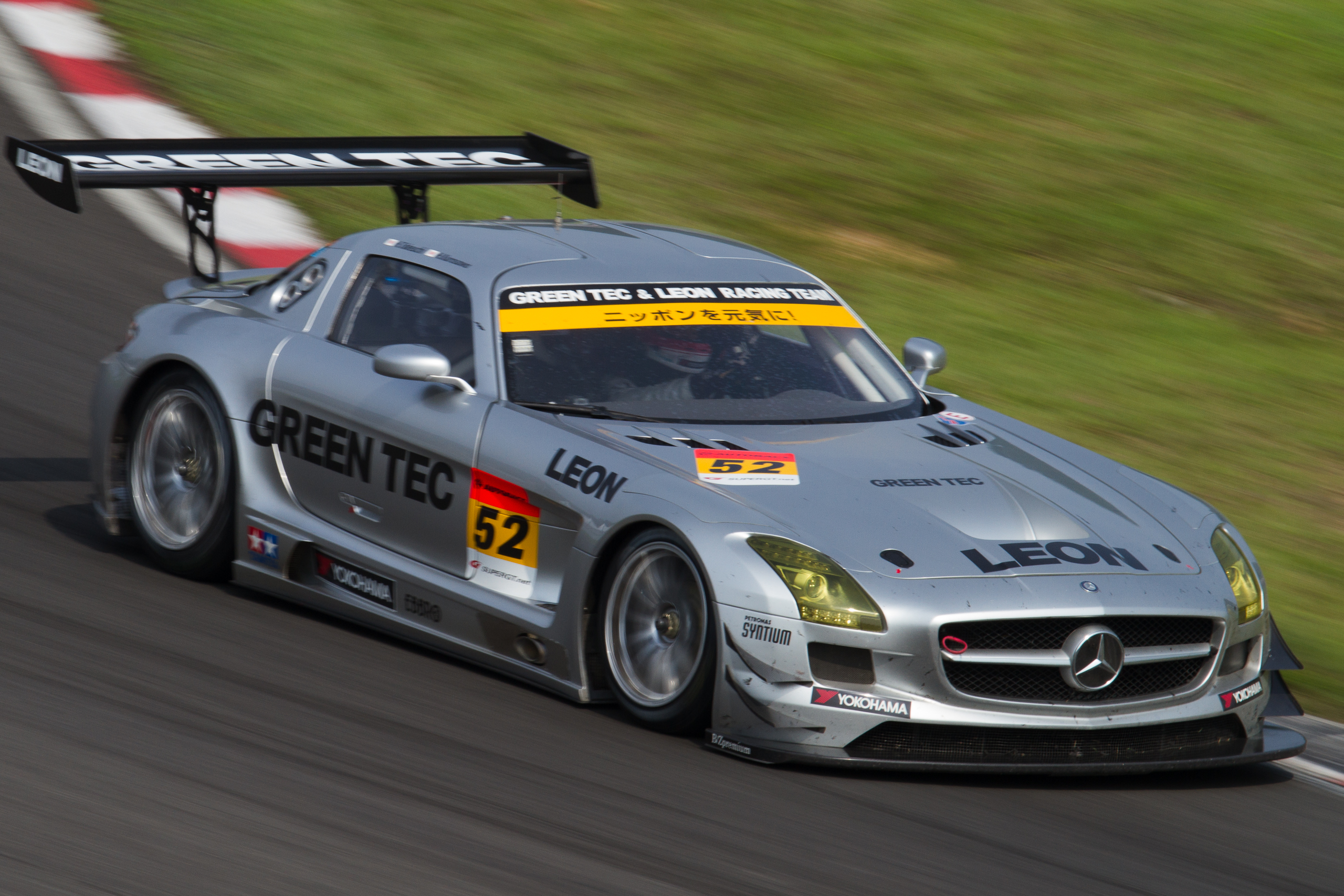
- Kurosawa in 2012
- Nationality: (Japan) Japanese
- Born: 26 September 1977 (age 49) Shizuoka Prefecture, Japan
- Relatives: Motoharu Kurosawa (father); Takuya Kurosawa (brother); Tsubasa Kurosawa (brother)
- Categorisation: FIA Gold

Championship titles
- 2018: Super GT – GT300

Haruki Kurosawa (黒澤 治樹, Kurosawa Haruki; born 26 September 1977 in Shizuoka Prefecture) is a Japanese racing driver. He is the 2018 Super GT – GT300 champion, having won it with LEON Racing, where he currently serves as its team director.

== Early career ==
Kurosawa took up motorcycle racing at an early age, graduating from the SRS-J (Suzuka Racing School Junior; now SRS-Moto) and competing in motocross and pocket bikes competitions near Mount Fuji. After graduating from SRS-J, Kurosawa began karting, most notably racing in the 1996 All-Japan Karting Championship.

Graduating from SRS-F at the end of 1996, Kurosawa competed in three Japanese Formula 3 races for Nakajima Racing, scoring a point at Sendai, before moving to the British Formula Three Championship for 1997.

Following a difficult year in England where he scored just a lone point at Pembrey, Kurosawa returned to the Japanese Formula 3 Championship for 1998. Scoring one podium in his two years with Lian Racing at Tsukuba in 1999, Kurosawa moved to TOM'S for 2000, taking his only win at Motegi and scoring a second-place finish at Sugo on his way to sixth in the points.

== GT career ==
=== JGTC/Super GT debut and early success (2002–2003, 2005–2011) ===
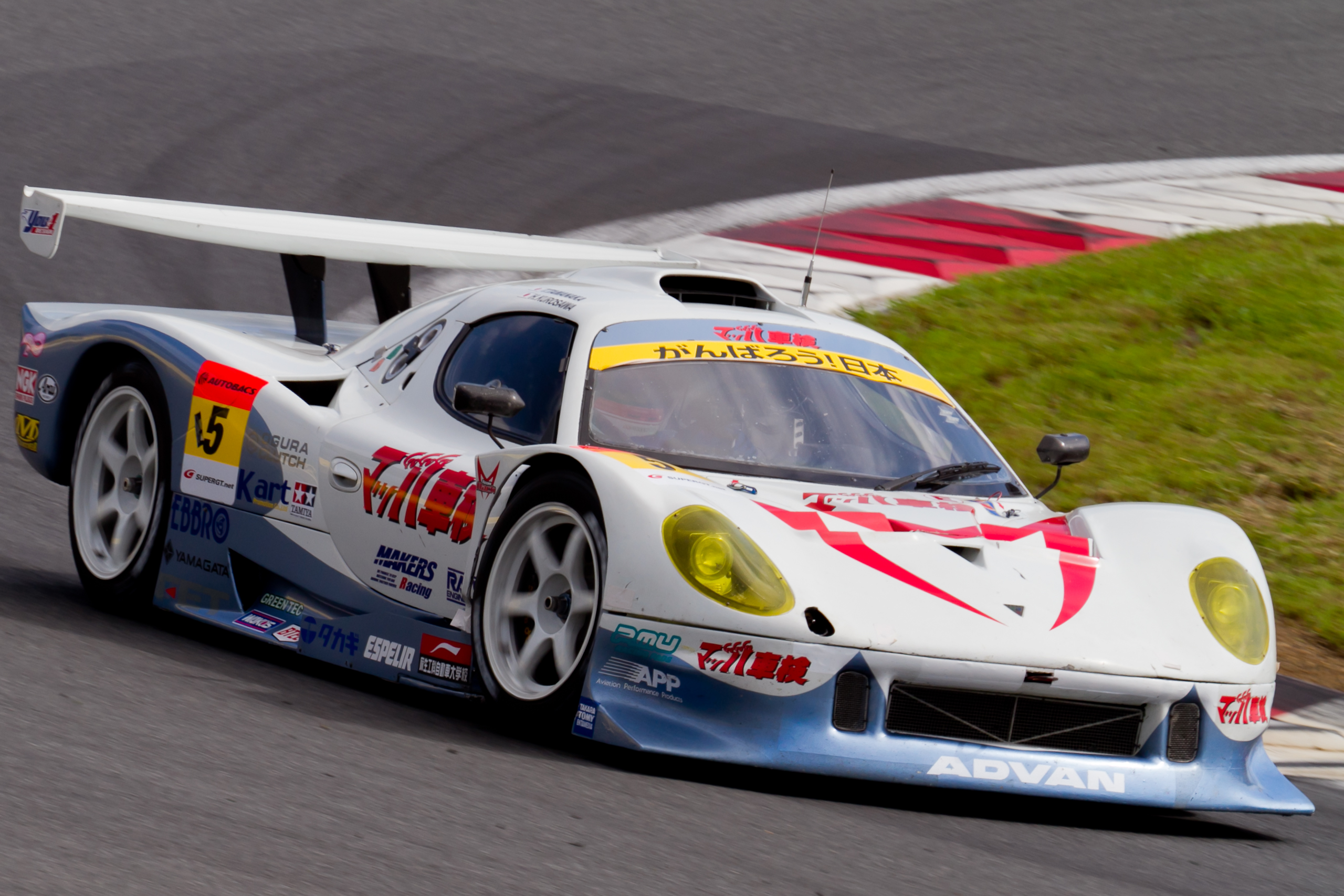
Kurosawa at the Fuji round of the 2011 Super GT season

Kurosawa made his JGTC debut in 2002 for Team Take One, competing in nine races in GT500 between 2002 and 2003 before switching to GT300 for the 2003 finale at Suzuka, where he finished third for SigmaTech Racing.

Returning to GT300 competition in 2005, Kurosawa joined M-TEC alongside Shinya Hosokawa for his first full season in the newly-rebranded Super GT Series. Starting off the season with a podium at Okayama, Kurosawa won both races at the newly-rebuilt Fuji and scored two further second-places to end the season runner-up in points.

Following a year mostly spent in Europe, Kurosawa raced in the last five races of the 2006 Super GT season for R&D Sport, taking the team's second podium of the season with a third-place finish at Motegi.

Kurosawa stayed with R&D Sport for 2007 alongside Shinsuke Shibahara. The duo won at Autopolis and scored further podiums at Suzuka and Motegi to finish third in the standings.

Staying with R&D Sport for a third season, Kurosawa scored only one podium, a second-place at the season-finale at Fuji, to finish 13th in points before leaving the team at season's end.

After leaving R&D Sport, Kurosawa first joined Team Taisan for 2009, before moving to Team Mach for the following two years. Despite switching teams, Kurosawa wasn't able to score a podium in the three years following his stint at R&D Sport, only taking two fourth places at Fuji in 2009 and Suzuka in 2010 as his best results.

=== Family-run LEON Racing and Super Taikyu return (2012–present) ===
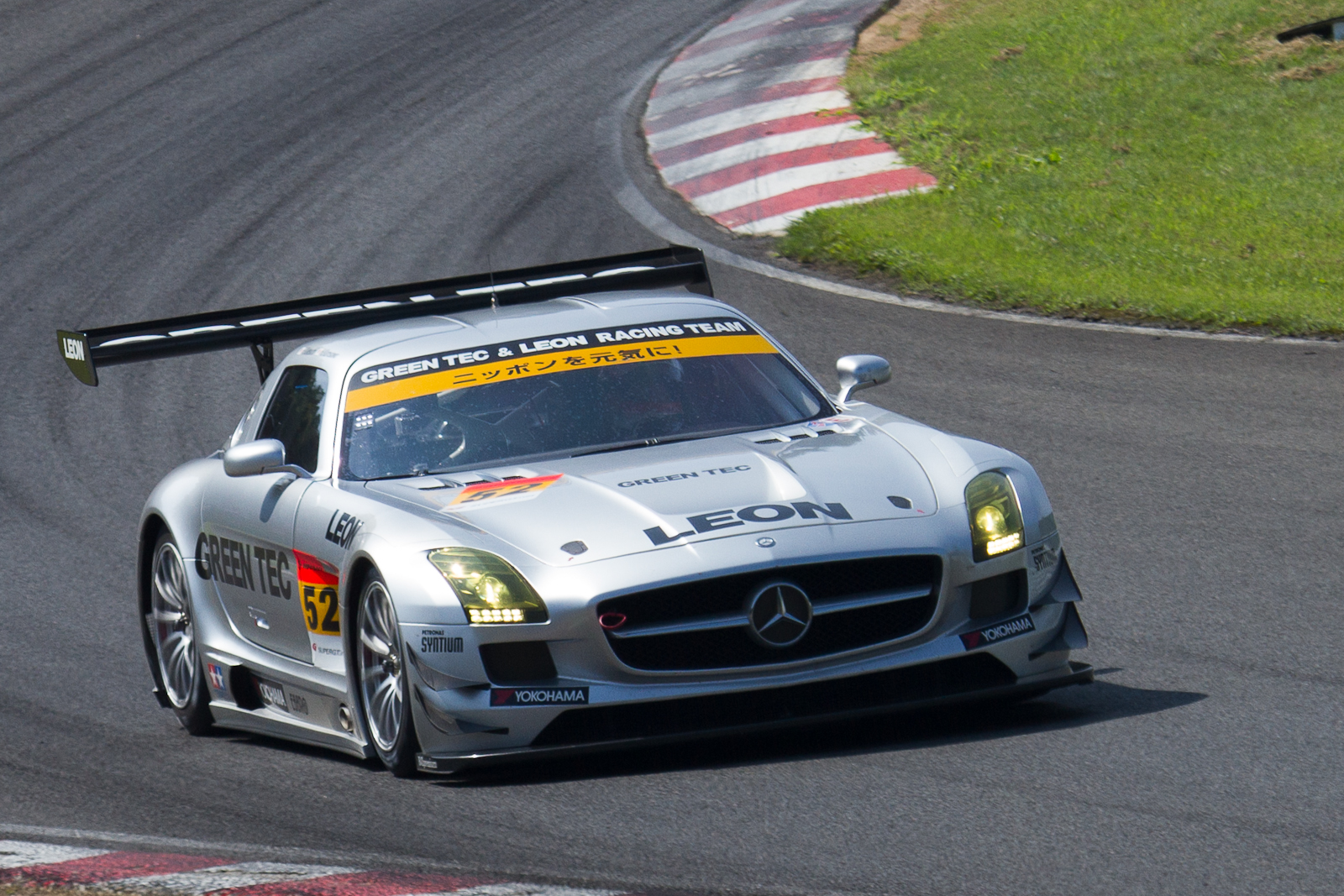
Kurosawa at the Sugo round of the 2012 Super GT season

Leaving Team Mach at the end of 2011, Kurosawa joined LEON Racing for 2012, a team created along with his father Motoharu which also partnered with Hironori Takeuchi's SHIFT Team for 2012. Alongside Takeuchi, Kurosawa scored LEON's first podium in GT300 at SUGO by finishing second.

With Takeuchi and Shift leaving after 2012, Kurosawa was joined by Masanobu Kato for the first two rounds of 2013, before he was replaced by Tsubasa Kurosawa for the rest of the season. The Kurosawa brothers scored their first podium together at the 250 km race at Suzuka along with Akihiko Nakaya, who joined them as the team's third driver.

In 2014, Kurosawa was mainly joined by his brother Tsubasa, with whom he scored a podium at Sugo, but was also joined by Kyosuke Mineo and Naoya Gamou, helping Kurosawa to finish ninth in points. With Gamou and Kurosawa returning for 2015, the pair scored a lone podium at Fuji to finish ninth in points for the second season in a row.

For 2016, LEON Racing switched to the Mercedes-AMG GT and with Kurosawa and Gamou returning, they won the opening race of the season at Okayama to give the car and the team their first win in the Super GT.

Staying with LEON Racing for 2017, Kurosawa started the season with a podium at Okayama and won two of the final three races to finish runner-up in the GT300 standings.

Having come close to the GT300 championship the year prior, Kurosawa stayed with LEON Racing for 2018. Finishing out of the top five only twice in the eight-race season, Kurosawa overcame a 12-point deficit to take the GT300 title by winning the season-ending race at Motegi.

Returning to LEON Racing for 2019, Kurosawa finished third in Buriram, but pulled out of the season ahead of the Autopolis round, giving Togo Suganami his debut in the series.

In 2022, Kurosawa returned to Super Taikyu, joining Martin Berry's Grid Motorsport in the ST-X class. Kurosawa won at Sugo in what would turn out to be his penultimate race in the series. Following various one-off appearances for LEON Racing in Super GT across the following three years, Kurosawa joined Team YUK Hirata-G to race in the ST-Z class of the 2026 Super Taikyu Series.

== Overseas career ==
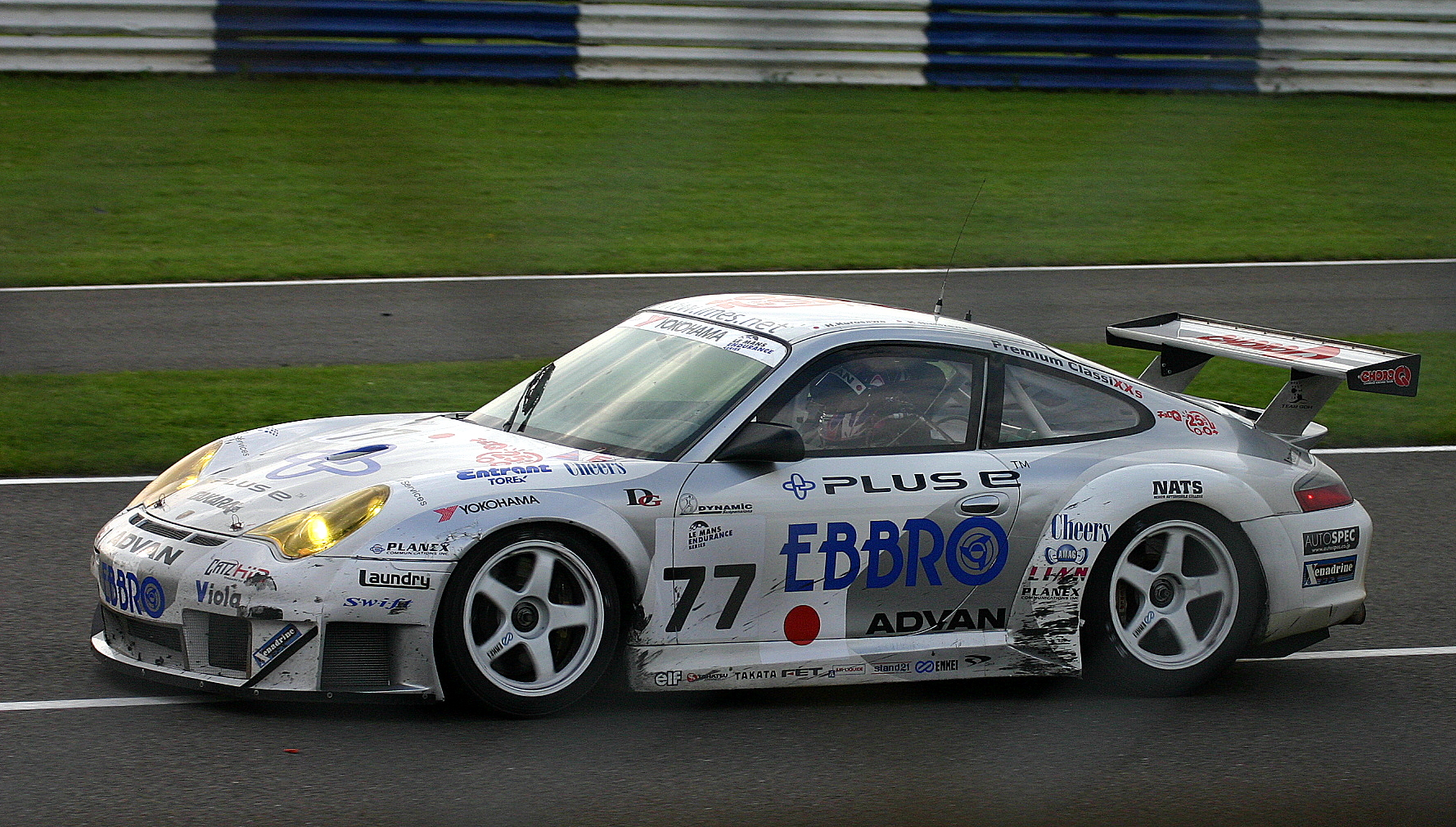
Kurosawa at the Silverstone round of the 2004 Le Mans Endurance Series season

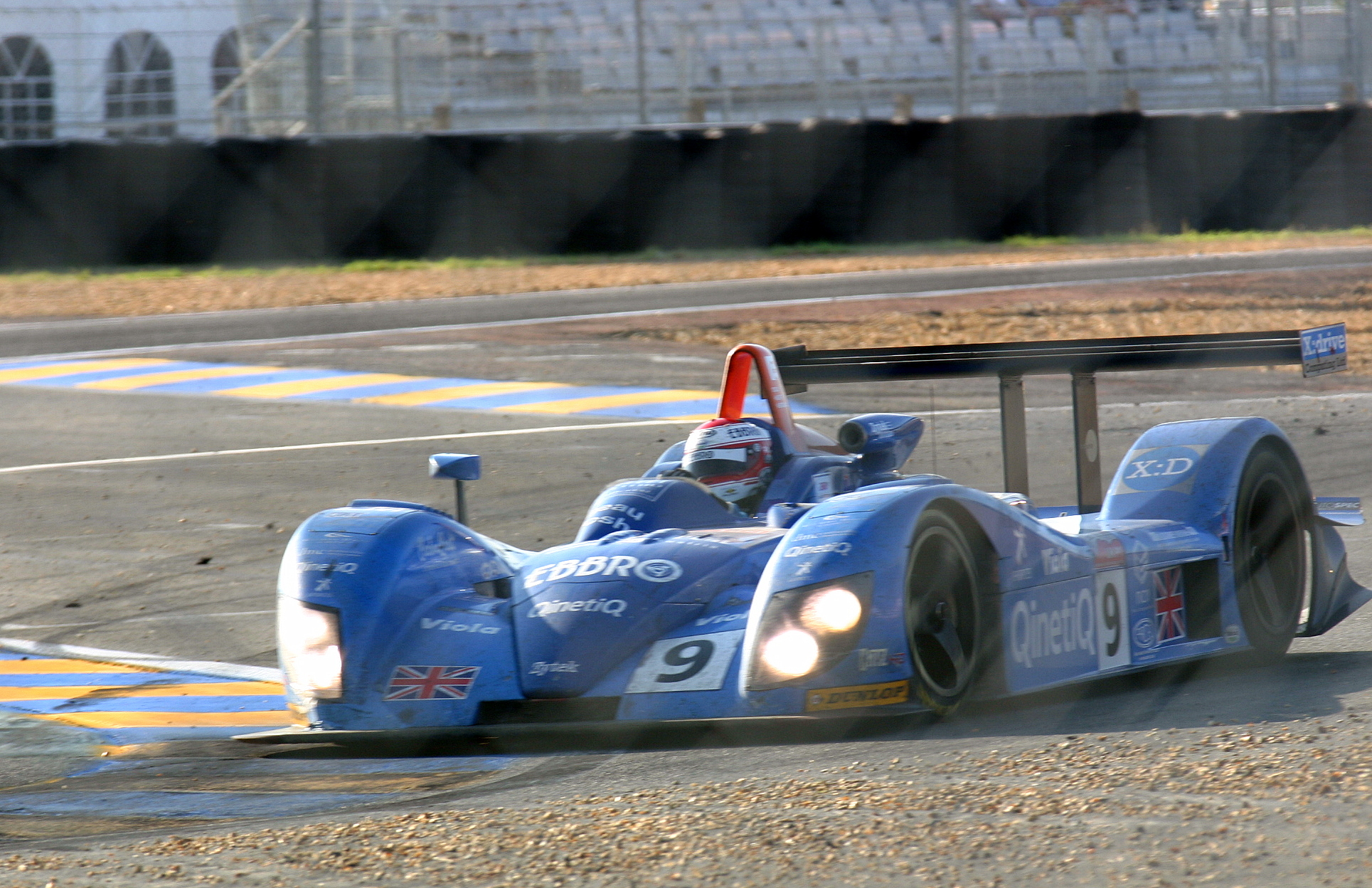
Kurosawa at the 2005 24 Hours of Le Mans

Kurosawa returned to Europe for 2004, racing in the GT class of the inaugural season of the Le Mans Endurance Series with Choro-Q Racing Team. On his return to Europe, Kurosawa finished third at Monza and also finished second in class on his first trip to Le Mans.

Returning to both the Le Mans Endurance Series and the 24 Hours of Le Mans in 2005, Kurosawa joined Team Sport in the LMP1 class alongside Sam Hignett and John Stack. In the former, Kurosawa took a lone podium Monza, while at Le Mans, Kurosawa wasn't classified as the car didn't complete the final lap.

Joining Courage Compétition for 2006, Kurosawa scored points at the Le Mans Series finale at Jarama despite suffering from a gearbox problem. At the end of the year, Kurosawa made a one-off appearance in the American Le Mans Series for Zytek Engineering, finishing second at the Petit Le Mans.

In 2007, Kurosawa joined Barazi-Epsilon - Zytek Engineering to race in the 24 Hours Le Mans in the LMP2 class. Despite losing time owing to repairs, Kurosawa finished second in class at the end of the race.

Kurosawa was set to return to the 24 Hours of Le Mans in 2011 for Greaves Motorsport, but withdrew shortly after the Tōhoku earthquake. In 2012, Kurosawa returned to Le Mans, racing for Jota in the LMP2 class.

Having not raced in prototypes since 2012, Kurosawa competed in the 2019–20 Asian Le Mans Series alongside Shaun Thong for K2 Uchino Racing in the LMP2 class. In the four race season, Kurosawa sat out the second round on health-related matters, and ended the season with a podium at the season-ending race in Buriram.

== Personal life ==
Kurosawa is the son of former racing driver Motoharu Kurosawa, and is also the brother of Takuya and Tsubasa Kurosawa who are also racing drivers.

== Racing record ==
=== Racing career summary ===
| Season | Series | Team | Races | Wins | Poles | F/Laps | Podiums | Points | Position |
|---|---|---|---|---|---|---|---|---|---|
| 1996 | Japanese Formula 3 Championship | Nakajima Racing | 3 | 0 | 0 | 0 | 0 | 1 | 13th |
| 1997 | British Formula Three Championship | Alan Docking Racing | 16 | 0 | 0 | 0 | 0 | 1 | 27th |
| 1997 | Masters of Formula 3 | Alan Docking Racing | 0 | 0 | 0 | 0 | 0 | N/A | DNQ |
| 1998 | Japanese Formula 3 Championship | Lian Racing | 10 | 0 | 0 | 0 | 0 | 4 | 11th |
| 1999 | Japanese Formula 3 Championship | Lian Racing | 10 | 0 | 0 | 0 | 1 | 8 | 9th |
| 2000 | Japanese Formula 3 Championship | TOM'S | 9 | 1 | 0 | 2 | 2 | 24 | 6th |
| 2000 | Macau Grand Prix | TOM'S | 1 | 0 | 0 | 0 | 0 | N/A | DNF |
| 2000 | Korea Super Prix | TOM'S | 1 | 0 | 0 | 0 | 0 | N/A | 15th |
| 2001 | Macau Grand Prix | Swiss Racing Team | 1 | 0 | 0 | 0 | 0 | N/A | 15th |
| 2001 | Korea Super Prix | Swiss Racing Team | 1 | 0 | 0 | 0 | 0 | N/A | 24th |
| 2002 | Formula Nippon | Forward Team Nova | 10 | 0 | 0 | 0 | 0 | 2 | 12th |
| 2002 | All Japan Grand Touring Car Championship – GT500 | Team Take One | 7 | 0 | 0 | 0 | 0 | 2 | 26th |
| 2003 | Formula Nippon | Planex EBBRO Nova | 10 | 0 | 0 | 0 | 0 | 0 | 19th |
| 2003 | All Japan Grand Touring Car Championship – GT500 | Hitotsuyama Racing | 2 | 0 | 0 | 0 | 0 | 0 | NC |
| 2003 | All Japan Grand Touring Car Championship – GT300 | SigmaTech Racing | 1 | 0 | 0 | 0 | 1 | 12 | 18th |
| 2004 | Le Mans Endurance Series – GT | Choro-Q Racing Team | 4 | 0 | 0 | 0 | 1 | 13 | 12th |
| 2004 | 24 Hours of Le Mans – GT | Choro-Q Racing Team | 1 | 0 | 0 | 0 | 1 | N/A | **2nd** |
| 2005 | Super GT – GT300 | M-Tec | 8 | 2 | 3 | 0 | 5 | 81 | **2nd** |
| 2005 | Le Mans Endurance Series – LMP1 | Team Jota | 3 | 0 | 0 | 0 | 1 | 13 | 10th |
| 2005 | 24 Hours of Le Mans – LMP1 | Team Jota - Zytek Engineering Ltd. | 1 | 0 | 0 | 0 | 0 | N/A | NC |
| 2006 | Le Mans Series – LMP1 | Courage Compétition | 5 | 0 | 0 | 0 | 0 | 4 | 25th |
| 2006 | 24 Hours of Le Mans – LMP1 | Courage Compétition | 1 | 0 | 0 | 0 | 0 | N/A | DNF |
| 2006 | Japan Le Mans Challenge – LMP1 | Team Mugen | 2 | 1 | 0 | 0 | 1 | 5 | 4th |
| 2006 | American Le Mans Series – LMP1 | Zytek Engineering | 1 | 0 | 0 | 0 | 1 | 22 | 18th |
| 2006 | Super GT – GT300 | Willcom R&D Sport | 4 | 0 | 1 | 0 | 1 | 33 | 12th |
| 2007 | Super GT – GT300 | Willcom R&D Sport | 9 | 1 | 0 | 0 | 3 | 76 | **3rd** |
| 2007 | Japan Le Mans Challenge – LMP1 | Team Mugen | 3 | 1 | 3 | 2 | 2 | 9 | **2nd** |
| 2007 | 24 Hours of Le Mans – LMP2 | Barazi-Epsilon - Zytek Engineering | 1 | 0 | 0 | 0 | 1 | N/A | **2nd** |
| 2007 | Le Mans Series – LMP1 | Creation Autosportif | 1 | 0 | 0 | 0 | 0 | 5 | 23rd |
| 2008 | Super GT – GT300 | Willcom R&D Sport | 8 | 0 | 0 | 0 | 1 | 38 | 13th |
| 2008 | 24 Hours of Le Mans – LMP1 | Tokai University - YGK Power | 1 | 0 | 0 | 0 | 0 | N/A | DNF |
| 2009 | Super GT – GT300 | Team Taisan | 7 | 0 | 0 | 0 | 0 | 12 | 14th |
| 2010 | Super GT – GT300 | Team Mach | 7 | 0 | 0 | 0 | 0 | 18 | 12th |
| 2011 | Super GT – GT300 | Team Mach | 7 | 0 | 0 | 0 | 0 | 2 | 20th |
| 2012 | Super GT – GT300 | Green Tec & Leon with Shift | 7 | 0 | 0 | 0 | 1 | 24 | 12th |
| 2012 | 24 Hours of Le Mans – LMP2 | Jota | 1 | 0 | 0 | 0 | 0 | N/A | DNF |
| 2013 | Super GT – GT300 | LEON Racing | 8 | 0 | 0 | 0 | 1 | 42 | 6th |
| 2014 | Super GT – GT300 | LEON Racing | 8 | 0 | 0 | 0 | 1 | 33 | 9th |
| 2015 | Super GT – GT300 | LEON Racing | 8 | 0 | 0 | 0 | 1 | 41 | 9th |
| 2016 | Super GT – GT300 | K2 R&D LEON Racing | 8 | 1 | 0 | 0 | 1 | 26 | 12th |
| 2017 | Super GT – GT300 | K2 R&D LEON Racing | 8 | 2 | 1 | 3 | 3 | 72 | **2nd** |
| 2018 | Super GT – GT300 | K2 R&D LEON Racing | 8 | 1 | 1 | 0 | 1 | 68 | **1st** |
| 2019 | Super GT – GT300 | K2 R&D LEON Racing | 5 | 0 | 0 | 0 | 1 | 19.5 | 16th |
| 2019–20 | Asian Le Mans Series – LMP2 | K2 Uchino Racing | 3 | 0 | 0 | 0 | 1 | 27 | 6th |
| 2022 | Super Taikyu - ST-X | Grid Motorsport | 4 | 1 | 1 | 0 | 2 | 127‡ | **2nd‡** |
| 2023 | Super GT – GT300 | K2 R&D LEON Racing | 2 | 0 | 0 | 0 | 0 | 0 | NC |
| 2024 | Super GT – GT300 | K2 R&D LEON Racing | 1 | 0 | 0 | 0 | 0 | 0 | NC |
| 2025 | Super GT – GT300 | K2 R&D LEON Racing | 0 | 0 | 0 | 0 | 0 | 0 | NC |
| 2026 | Super Taikyu – ST-Z | Team YUK Hirata-G | | | | | | ‡ | ‡ |
| 2026 | Super GT – GT300 | K2 R&D LEON Racing | 0 | 0 | 0 | 0 | 0 | 0 | NC |

‡ Team standings

=== Complete Japanese Formula 3 results ===
(key) (Races in bold indicate pole position) (Races in italics indicate fastest lap)

| Year | Team | Engine | 1 | 2 | 3 | 4 | 5 | 6 | 7 | 8 | 9 | 10 | DC | Pts |
|---|---|---|---|---|---|---|---|---|---|---|---|---|---|---|
| 1996 | Nakajima Racing | Mugen | SUZ1 | TSU | MIN | FUJ1 | SUZ2 | SUG; 9 | SEN; 7 | SUZ3; 6 | FUJ2 | | NC | 0 |
| 1998 | Lian Racing | Mugen | SUZ1; Ret | TSU; Ret | MIN; 13 | FUJ; 8 | MOT; 12 | SUZ2; 6 | SUG1; 17 | OKA; 5 | SEN; 11 | SUG2; 6 | 12th | 4 |
| 1999 | Lian Racing | Mugen | SUZ1; 12 | TSU; 2 | FUJ1; 8 | MIN; 7 | FUJ2; 14 | SUZ2; 5 | SUG1; Ret | OKA; Ret | MOT; 11 | SUZ3; 7 | 9th | 8 |
| 2000 | TOM'S | TOM'S | SUZ1; Ret | TSU; 4 | FUJ; 7 | MIN; 6 | OKA; 4 | SUZ2; 5 | SUG1; 2 | MOT; 1 | SEN; 7 | SUZ3 | 6th | 24 |

=== Complete British Formula 3 results ===
(key) (Races in bold indicate pole position) (Races in italics indicate fastest lap)

| Year | Team | Engine | Class | 1 | 2 | 3 | 4 | 5 | 6 | 7 | 8 | 9 | 10 | 11 | 12 | 13 | 14 | 15 | 16 | DC | Pts |
|---|---|---|---|---|---|---|---|---|---|---|---|---|---|---|---|---|---|---|---|---|---|
| 1997 | Alan Docking Racing | Mugen | A | DON; 16 | SIL; 13 | THR; Ret | BRH; 12 | SIL; Ret | CRO; 13 | OUL; 12 | SIL; 18 | PEM; 10 | PEM; Ret | DON; 14 | SNE; Ret | SNE; Ret | SPA; 19 | SIL; 17 | THR; 15 | 27th | 1 |

=== Complete Formula Nippon results ===
(key) (Races in bold indicate pole position) (Races in italics indicate fastest lap)

| Year | Team | 1 | 2 | 3 | 4 | 5 | 6 | 7 | 8 | 9 | 10 | DC | Points |
|---|---|---|---|---|---|---|---|---|---|---|---|---|---|
| 2002 | Forward Team Nova | SUZ; 9 | FUJ; 5 | MIN; Ret | SUZ; Ret | MOT; 12 | SUG; 10 | FUJ; 12 | MIN; Ret | MOT; Ret | SUZ; 12 | 12th | 2 |
| 2003 | Planex EBBRO Nova | SUZ; Ret | FUJ; Ret | MIN; 9 | MOT; 10 | SUZ; 11 | SUG; Ret | FUJ; Ret | MIN; 11 | MOT; Ret | SUZ; Ret | 19th | 0 |

=== Complete JGTC/Super GT Results ===
(key) (Races in bold indicate pole position) (Races in italics indicate fastest lap)

| Year | Team | Car | Class | 1 | 2 | 3 | 4 | 5 | 6 | 7 | 8 | 9 | DC | Pts |
|---|---|---|---|---|---|---|---|---|---|---|---|---|---|---|
| 2002 | Team Take One | McLaren F1 GTR | GT500 | TAI; 16 | FUJ; 9 | SUG; 14 | SEP | FUJ; Ret | MOT; Ret | MIN; Ret | SUZ; 11 | | 26th | 2 |
| 2003 | Hitotsuyama Racing | McLaren F1 GTR | GT500 | TAI | FUJ | SUG | FUJ; 18 | FUJ; 14 | MOT | AUT | | | NC | 0 |
| 2003 | SigmaTech Racing | Toyota Celica | GT300 | | | | | | | | SUZ; 3 | | 18th | 12 |
| 2005 | M-Tec | Honda NSX | GT300 | OKA; 3 | **FUJ**; 1 | SEP; 9 | **SUG**; 2 | MOT; 12 | **FUJ**; 1 | AUT; 7 | SUZ; 2 | | 2nd | 81 |
| 2006 | Willcom R&D Sport | Vemac RD408R | GT300 | SUZ | TAI | FUJ | SEP | SUG; Ret | SUZ; 7 | **MOT**; 3 | AUT; 6 | FUJ; 14 | 12th | 33 |
| 2007 | Willcom R&D Sport | Vemac RD408R | GT300 | SUZ; 5 | OKA; 8 | FUJ; Ret | SEP; 14 | SUG; 5 | SUZ; 3 | MOT; 2 | AUT; 1 | FUJ; 4 | 3rd | 76 |
| 2008 | Willcom R&D Sport | Vemac RD408R | GT300 | SUZ; DNQ | OKA; 5 | FUJ; 6 | SEP; 8 | SUG; 11 | SUZ; 4 | MOT; 12 | AUT; 14 | FUJ; 2 | 13th | 38 |
| 2009 | Team Taisan | Porsche 996 GT3-RSR | GT300 | OKA; 10 | SUZ; 10 | FUJ; 4 | SEP; Ret | SUG | SUZ; 16 | FUJ; 14 | AUT | MOT; 9 | 14th | 12 |
| 2010 | Team Mach | Vemac RD408R | GT300 | SUZ; 4 | OKA; Ret | FUJ; 18 | SEP; 13 | SUG; 9 | SUZ; 9 | FUJ; C | MOT; 5 | | 12th | 18 |
| 2011 | Team Mach | Vemac RD320R | GT300 | OKA; 19 | FUJ | SEP; 12 | SUG; 9 | SUZ; Ret | FUJ; 17 | AUT; 21 | MOT; 15 | | 20th | 2 |
| 2012 | Green Tech Reon With Shift | Mercedes-Benz SLS AMG GT3 | GT300 | TAI; 12 | FUJ; 10 | SEP; 6 | SUG; 2 | SUZ; Ret | FUJ | AUT; Ret | MOT; 8 | | 12th | 24 |
| 2013 | LEON Racing | Mercedes-Benz SLS AMG GT3 | GT300 | TAI; 6 | FUJ; 8 | SEP; 8 | SUG; 7 | SUZ; 3 | FUJ; 4 | FUJ; 8 | AUT; 18 | MOT; 6 | 6th | 42 |
| 2014 | LEON Racing | Mercedes-Benz SLS AMG GT3 | GT300 | OKA; 5 | FSW; 8 | AUT; 10 | SUG; 2 | FSW; 8 | SUZ; Ret | CHA; Ret | TRM; 6 | | 9th | 33 |
| 2015 | LEON Racing | Mercedes-Benz SLS AMG GT3 | GT300 | OKA; 22 | FSW; 7 | CHA; 5 | FSW; 2 | SUZ; 6 | SUG; 7 | AUT; 12 | TRM; 5 | | 9th | 41 |
| 2016 | K2 R&D LEON Racing | Mercedes-AMG GT3 | GT300 | OKA; 1 | FSW; Ret | SUG; 16 | FSW; 23 | SUZ; 8 | CHA; 11 | TRM; 9 | TRM; 24 | | 12th | 26 |
| 2017 | K2 R&D LEON Racing | Mercedes-AMG GT3 | GT300 | **OKA**; 2 | FSW; 5 | AUT; 10 | SUG; 7 | FSW; 13 | SUZ; 1 | CHA; 13 | TRM; 1 | | **2nd** | **72** |
| 2018 | K2 R&D LEON Racing | Mercedes-AMG GT3 | GT300 | OKA; 4 | FSW; 4 | SUZ; 7 | **CHA**; 4 | FSW; 4 | SUG; 8 | AUT; 5 | TRM; 1 | | **1st** | **68** |
| 2019 | K2 R&D LEON Racing | Mercedes-AMG GT3 | GT300 | OKA; 6 | FSW; 5 | SUZ; 14 | CHA; 3 | FSW; Ret | AUT | SUG | TRM | | 16th | 19.5 |
| 2023 | K2 R&D LEON Racing | Mercedes-AMG GT3 Evo | GT300 | OKA | FUJ | SUZ | FUJ | SUZ; Ret | SUG | AUT; 12 | MOT | | NC | 0 |
| 2024 | K2 R&D LEON Racing | Mercedes-AMG GT3 Evo | GT300 | OKA | FUJ; 26 | SUZ; 8† | **FUJ**; **1^{1}†** | SUG | AUT; 6† | MOT | SUZ; 4† | | NC | 0 |
| 2025 | K2 R&D LEON Racing | Mercedes-AMG GT3 Evo | GT300 | OKA | FUJ; 5† | SEP | FS1 | FS2 | SUZ | SUG | AUT; 6† | MOT | NC | 0 |
| 2026 | K2 R&D LEON Racing | Mercedes-AMG GT3 Evo | GT300 | OKA | FUJ; 2† | FUJ | SUZ | SUG | AUT; 3† | MOT | MOT | | NC | 0 |

^{*} Season still in progress. ^{†} Did not run during the race as a third driver and was ineligible for championship points.

=== Complete European Le Mans Series results ===
| Year | Entrant | Class | Car | Engine | 1 | 2 | 3 | 4 | 5 | 6 | Rank | Points |
|---|---|---|---|---|---|---|---|---|---|---|---|---|
| 2004 | Choro-Q Racing Team | GT | Porsche 911 GT3-RSR | Porsche 3.6 L Flat-6 | MNZ; 3 | NUR; 3 | SIL; 8 | SPA; Ret | | | 12th | 13 |
| 2005 | Team Jota | LMP1 | Zytek 04S | Zytek ZG348 3.4L V8 | SPA; Ret | MNZ; 2 | SIL; 4 | NÜR; WD | IST | | 10th | 13 |
| 2006 | Courage Compétition | LMP1 | Courage LC70 | Mugen MF458S 4.5L V8 | IST; Ret | SPA; Ret | NUR; NC | DON; NC | JAR; 5 | | 17th | 4 |
| 2007 | Creation Autosportif | LMP1 | Creation CA07 | Judd GV5.5 S2 5.5L V10 | MNZ | VAL | NUR | SPA | SIL; 4 | MIL | 15th | 5 |

=== 24 Hours of Le Mans results ===
| Year | Team | Co-Drivers | Car | Class | Laps | Pos. | Class Pos. |
|---|---|---|---|---|---|---|---|
| 2004 | (Japan) ChoroQ Racing Team | (Japan) Manabu Orido (Japan) Kazuyuki Nishizawa | Porsche 911 GT3 RSR | GT | 322 | 12th | **2nd** |
| 2005 | (United Kingdom) Team Jota (United Kingdom) Zytek Engineering Ltd. | (United Kingdom) Sam Hignett (United Kingdom) John Stack | Zytek 04S | LMP1 | 325 | DNF | DNF |
| 2006 | (France) Courage Compétition | (France) Jean-Marc Gounon (Japan) Shinji Nakano | Courage LC70-Mugen | LMP1 | 35 | DNF | DNF |
| 2007 | (France) Barazi-Epsilon (United Kingdom) Zytek Engineering | (Mexico) Adrian Fernández (United Kingdom) Robbie Kerr | Zytek 07S/2 | LMP2 | 301 | 27th | **2nd** |
| 2008 | (Japan) Tōkai University (Japan) YGK Power | (Japan) Masami Kageyama (Japan) Toshio Suzuki | Courage-Oreca LC70-YGK | LMP1 | 185 | DNF | DNF |
| 2012 | (United Kingdom) Jota | (United Kingdom) Simon Dolan (United Kingdom) Sam Hancock | Zytek Z11SN-Nissan | LMP2 | 271 | DNF | DNF |

=== Complete Asian Le Mans Series results ===
(key) (Races in bold indicate pole position) (Races in italics indicate fastest lap)

| Year | Team | Class | Car | Engine | 1 | 2 | 3 | 4 | Pos. | Points |
|---|---|---|---|---|---|---|---|---|---|---|
| 2019–20 | K2 Uchino Racing | LMP2 | Oreca 07 | Gibson GK428 4.2 L V8 | SHA; Ret | BEN; WD | CHA; 4 | SEP; 3 | 6th | 27 |
