= 2007 Japan Le Mans Challenge =

Seasons
- ← 2006 none →

The 2007 Japan Le Mans Challenge was the second season for the Japan Le Mans Challenge, a series created by the SERO and sanctioned by the ACO. It began at Sportsland SUGO on May 13 and ended at Okayama International Circuit on October 27 after 4 races.

== Schedule ==
On October 29, 2006, during the Okayama 1000 km, SERO announced their schedule for the 2007 season, adding a fourth race at Fuji.

Rnd	Race	Circuit	Date
1	Sportsland Sugo 1000 km	(Miyagi Prefecture) Sportsland SUGO	May 13
2	Fuji 1000 km	(Shizuoka Prefecture) Fuji Speedway	June 3
3	Motegi 1000 km	(Tochigi Prefecture) Twin Ring Motegi	July 22
4	Okayama 1000 km	(Okayama Prefecture) Okayama International Circuit	October 27

== Entries ==
=== LMP1 ===
Team	Chassis	Engine	Tyres	No.	Drivers	Rounds
(Japan) Team Mugen	Courage LC70	Mugen MF458S 4.5 L V8	M	16	(Japan) Haruki Kurosawa	1, 3–4
(Japan) Team Mugen	Courage LC70	Mugen MF458S 4.5 L V8	M	16	(Japan) Shinji Nakano	1, 3–4
(Japan) Team Mugen	Courage LC70	Mugen MF458S 4.5 L V8	M	16	(Japan) Seiji Ara	2
(Japan) Team Mugen	Courage LC70	Mugen MF458S 4.5 L V8	M	16	(Japan) Daisuke Itō	2
(Japan) Hitotsuyama Racing	Zytek 05S	Zytek ZB408 4.0 L V8	D	22	(Japan) Hideki Noda	All
(Japan) Hitotsuyama Racing	Zytek 05S	Zytek ZB408 4.0 L V8	D	22	(Japan) Shinsuke Yamazaki	All

=== LMP2 ===
Team	Chassis	Engine	Tyres	No.	Drivers	Rounds
(Japan) Forward Racing	Dallara GC21	Toyota 3S-GTE 2.0 L I4	Y	5	(Japan) Takeshi Itou	3
(Japan) Forward Racing	Dallara GC21	Toyota 3S-GTE 2.0 L I4	Y	5	(Japan) Takuya Shirasaka	3
(Japan) Max Racing	Oscar RS.KK-LM	Honda K20A 2.0 L I4	Y	15	(Japan) Toshiya Itou	All
(Japan) Max Racing	Oscar RS.KK-LM	Honda K20A 2.0 L I4	Y	15	(Japan) Masayuki Ueda	All
(Japan) Max Racing	Oscar RS.KK-LM	Honda K20A 2.0 L I4	Y	15	(Japan) Hideki Hirota	1, 4
(Japan) Max Racing	Oscar RS.KK-LM	Honda K20A 2.0 L I4	Y	15	(Japan) Kazuyoshi Takamizawa	2–3
(Japan) AIM Sports	Dallara GC21	Toyota 3S-GTE 2.0 L I4	Y	18	(Japan) Yuuji Asou	All
(Japan) AIM Sports	Dallara GC21	Toyota 3S-GTE 2.0 L I4	Y	18	(Japan) Masaru Tomizawa	All
(Japan) AIM Sports	Dallara GC21	Toyota 3S-GTE 2.0 L I4	Y	18	(Japan) Ken Kurosawa	2, 4
(Japan) AIM Sports	Dallara GC21	Toyota 3S-GTE 2.0 L I4	Y	18	(Japan) Yoshitaka Kuroda	1
(Japan) AIM Sports	Dallara GC21	Toyota 3S-GTE 2.0 L I4	Y	18	(Japan) Masaki Matsushita	3
(Japan) Rs Serizawa	Dallara GC21	Toyota 3S-GTE 2.0 L I4	Y	37	(Japan) Hiroaki Ishiura	3
(Japan) Rs Serizawa	Dallara GC21	Toyota 3S-GTE 2.0 L I4	Y	37	(Japan) Hiroshi Koizumi	3
(Japan) Rs Serizawa	Dallara GC21	Toyota 3S-GTE 2.0 L I4	Y	37	(Japan) Tsubasa Kurosawa	3
(Japan) Jidousya Koubou Myst	Oscar SK93	Toyota 3S-GTE 2.0 L I4	Y	111	(Japan) Naoki Furuya	4
(Japan) Jidousya Koubou Myst	Oscar SK93	Toyota 3S-GTE 2.0 L I4	Y	111	(Japan) Tatsuya Hashimoto	4
(Japan) Jidousya Koubou Myst	Oscar SK93	Toyota 3S-GTE 2.0 L I4	Y	111	(Japan) Tomokuni Waki	4

=== LMGT1 ===
Team	Chassis	Engine	Tyres	No.	Drivers	Rounds
(Japan) Zipspeed	Chevrolet Corvette	Chevrolet LS1 5.7 V8	D	4	(Japan) Takaya Tsubobayashi	2
(Japan) Zipspeed	Chevrolet Corvette	Chevrolet LS1 5.7 V8	D	4	(Japan) Akira Yoshitomi	2
(Japan) Scuderia Forme	Porsche 996 GT3-RS	Porsche M96/73 3.6 L Flat-6	Y	7	(Japan) Masahiro Fujino	2–4
(Japan) Scuderia Forme	Porsche 996 GT3-RS	Porsche M96/73 3.6 L Flat-6	Y	7	(Japan) Tadakazu Kojima	2–4
(Japan) Scuderia Forme	Porsche 996 GT3-RS	Porsche M96/73 3.6 L Flat-6	Y	7	(Japan) Kiichirou Nagashiki	4
(Japan) Hitotsuyama Racing	Ferrari 550-GTS Maranello	Ferrari F133 A 6.0 L V12	D	21	(Japan) Tomonobu Fujii	All
(Japan) Hitotsuyama Racing	Ferrari 550-GTS Maranello	Ferrari F133 A 6.0 L V12	D	21	(Japan) Akira Iida	All
(Japan) Hitotsuyama Racing	Ferrari 550-GTS Maranello	Ferrari F133 A 6.0 L V12	D	21	(Japan) Eiichi Tajima	1
(Japan) Hitotsuyama Racing	Ferrari 550-GTS Maranello	Ferrari F133 A 6.0 L V12	D	21	(Japan) Mikio Hitotsuyama	4
(Japan) Arktech Motor Sports	Porsche Boxster	Porsche M96/77 3.6 L Flat-6	K	110	(Japan) Takuya Kurosawa	1
(Japan) Arktech Motor Sports	Porsche Boxster	Porsche M96/77 3.6 L Flat-6	K	110	(Japan) Hidetoshi Mitsusada	1

=== LMGT2 ===
Team	Chassis	Engine	Tyres	No.	Drivers	Rounds
(Japan) Scuderia Forme	Porsche 996 GT3-RS	Porsche M96/73 3.6 L Flat-6	Y	7	(Japan) Masahiro Fujino	1
(Japan) Scuderia Forme	Porsche 996 GT3-RS	Porsche M96/73 3.6 L Flat-6	Y	7	(Japan) Tadakazu Kojima	1
(Japan) Hitotsuyama Racing	Porsche 997 GT3-RSR	Porsche M97/80 3.8 L Flat-6	D	20	(Japan) Hideo Fukuyama	All
(Japan) Hitotsuyama Racing	Porsche 997 GT3-RSR	Porsche M97/80 3.8 L Flat-6	D	20	(Japan) Yukinori Taniguchi	All
(Japan) Hitotsuyama Racing	Porsche 997 GT3-RSR	Porsche M97/80 3.8 L Flat-6	D	20	(Japan) Yasuo Miyagawa	1–2
(Japan) Hitotsuyama Racing	Porsche 997 GT3-RSR	Porsche M97/80 3.8 L Flat-6	D	20	(Japan) Yukihiro Hane	3–4
(Japan) Team Kawamura	Ferrari F430 GT	Ferrari F136 GT 4.0 L V8	M	27	(Japan) Kouji Aoyama	All
(Japan) Team Kawamura	Ferrari F430 GT	Ferrari F136 GT 4.0 L V8	M	27	(Japan) Morio Nitta	All
(Japan) Team Kawamura	Ferrari F430 GT	Ferrari F136 GT 4.0 L V8	M	27	(Japan) Shinichi Takagi	All
(Japan) 910 Racing	Porsche 996 GT3-R	Porsche M96/73 3.6 L Flat-6	Y	910	(Japan) "Dragon"	All
(Japan) 910 Racing	Porsche 996 GT3-R	Porsche M96/73 3.6 L Flat-6	Y	910	(Japan) Yoshiaki Nakayama	All
(Japan) 910 Racing	Porsche 996 GT3-R	Porsche M96/73 3.6 L Flat-6	Y	910	(Japan) Motoyoshi Yoshida	All

== Season results ==
Bold indicates overall winners.

Rnd	Circuit	LMP1 Winning Team	LMP2 Winning Team	LMGT1 Winning Team	LMGT2 Winning Team	Report
Rnd	Circuit	LMP1 Winning Drivers	LMP2 Winning Drivers	LMGT1 Winning Drivers	LMGT2 Winning Drivers	Report
1	Sugo	**(Japan) No. 22 Hitotsuyama Racing**	(Japan) No. 18 AIM Sports	(Japan) No. 21 Hitotsuyama Racing	(Japan) No. 27 Team Kawamura	Report
1	Sugo	**(Japan) Hideki Noda** **(Japan) Shinsuke Yamazaki**	(Japan) Yuji Aso (Japan) Masaru Tomizawa (Japan) Masayuki Yamashita	(Japan) Tomonobu Fujii (Japan) Akira Iida	(Japan) Koji Aoyama (Japan) Morio Nitta (Japan) Shinichi Takagi	Report
2	Fuji	**(Japan) No. 22 Hitotsuyama Racing**	(Japan) No. 18 AIM Sports	(Japan) No. 21 Hitotsuyama Racing	(Japan) No. 27 Team Kawamura	Report
2	Fuji	**(Japan) Hideki Noda** **(Japan) Shinsuke Yamazaki**	(Japan) Yuji Aso (Japan) Yoshitaka Kuroda (Japan) Masaru Tomizawa	(Japan) Tomonobu Fujii (Japan) Akira Iida	(Japan) Koji Aoyama (Japan) Morio Nitta (Japan) Shinichi Takagi	Report
3	Motegi	**(Japan) No. 22 Hitotsuyama Racing**	(Japan) No. 15 Max Racing	(Japan) No. 21 Hitotsuyama Racing	(Japan) No. 27 Team Kawamura	Report
3	Motegi	**(Japan) Hideki Noda** **(Japan) Shinsuke Yamazaki**	(Japan) Toshiya Itou (Japan) Kazuyoshi Takamizawa (Japan) Masayuki Ueda	(Japan) Tomonobu Fujii (Japan) Akira Iida	(Japan) Koji Aoyama (Japan) Morio Nitta (Japan) Shinichi Takagi	Report
4	Okayama	(Japan) No. 16 Team Mugen	**(Japan) No. 18 AIM Sports**	(Japan) No. 21 Hitotsuyama Racing	(Japan) No. 20 Hitotsuyama Racing	Report
4	Okayama	(Japan) Haruki Kurosawa (Japan) Shinji Nakano	**(Japan) Yuuji Asou** **(Japan) Tsubasa Kurosawa** **(Japan) Masaru Tomizawa**	(Japan) Tomonobu Fujii (Japan) Mikio Hitotsuyama (Japan) Akira Iida	(Japan) Hideo Fukuyama (Japan) Yukihiro Hane (Japan) Yukinori Taniguchi	Report

== Championship standings ==
=== Points system ===
Points are awarded to finishers based on how many cars were entered in each class. For team's championships, only the top finishing car in a team scores points towards the championship. For classes with a more than five cars, points are scored as follows:

Position	1st	2nd	3rd	4th	5th	6th	7th	8th
Points	10	8	6	5	4	3	2	1

For classes with a fewer than five cars, points are scored as follows:

Position	1st	2nd	3rd	4th	5th
Points	5	4	3	2.5	2

=== Drivers' Championship ===
==== LMP1 standings ====
Pos.	Drivers	Team	SUG	FUJ	MOT	OKA	Points
1	(Japan) Hideki Noda (Japan) Shinsuke Yamazaki	(Japan) Hitotsuyama Racing	1	1	1	2	19
2	(Japan) Haruki Kurosawa (Japan) Shinji Nakano	(Japan) Team Mugen	**2**		**NC**	**1**	9
NC	(Japan) Seiji Ara (Japan) Daisuke Itō	(Japan) Team Mugen		**NC**			0

Colour	Result
Gold	Winner
Silver	Second place
Bronze	Third place
Green	Points classification
Blue	Non-points classification
Blue	Non-classified finish (NC)
Purple	Retired, not classified (Ret)
Red	Did not qualify (DNQ)
Red	Did not pre-qualify (DNPQ)
Black	Disqualified (DSQ)
White	Did not start (DNS)
White	Withdrew (WD)
White	Race cancelled (C)
Blank	Did not practice (DNP)
Blank	Did not arrive (DNA)
Blank	Excluded (EX)

**Bold** – Pole
Italic – Fastest Lap

==== LMP2 standings ====
Pos.	Drivers	Team	SUG	FUJ	MOT	OKA	Points
1	(Japan) Yuji Aso (Japan) Masaru Tomizawa	(Japan) AIM Sports	**1**	**1**	**2**	**1**	19
2	(Japan) Toshiya Itou (Japan) Masayuki Ueda	(Japan) Max Racing	2	2	1	3	16
3	(Japan) Tsubasa Kurosawa	(Japan) AIM Sports		**1**	Ret	**1**	10
4	(Japan) Kazuyoshi Takamizawa	(Japan) Max Racing		2	1		9
5	(Japan) Hideki Hirota	(Japan) Max Racing	2			3	7
6	(Japan) Yoshitaka Kuroda	(Japan) AIM Sports	**1**				5
7	(Japan) Masaki Matsushita	(Japan) AIM Sports			**2**		4
8	(Japan) Naoki Furuya (Japan) Tatsuya Hashimoto (Japan) Tomokuni Waki	(Japan) Jidousya Koubou Myst				2	4
NC	(Japan) Takeshi Itou (Japan) Takuya Shirasaka	(Japan) Forward Racing			NC		0
NC	(Japan) Hiroaki Ishiura (Japan) Hiroshi Koizumi (Japan) Tsubasa Kurosawa	(Japan) Rs Serizawa			Ret		0

==== LMGT1 standings ====
Pos.	Drivers	Team	SUG	FUJ	MOT	OKA	Points
1	(Japan) Tomonobu Fujii (Japan) Akira Iida	(Japan) Hitotsuyama Racing	**1**	**1**	1	**1**	20
2	(Japan) Eiichi Tajima	(Japan) Hitotsuyama Racing	**1**				5
3	(Japan) Mikio Hitotsuyama	(Japan) Hitotsuyama Racing				**1**	5
4	(Japan) Masahiro Fujino (Japan) Tadakazu Kojima	(Japan) Scuderia Forme		2	**Ret**	Ret	4
NC	(Japan) Takuya Kurosawa (Japan) Hidetoshi Mitsusada	(Japan) Arktech Motor Sports	NC				0
NC	(Japan) Takaya Tsubobayashi (Japan) Akira Yoshitomi	(Japan) Zipspeed		Ret			0
NC	(Japan) Kiichirou Nagashiki	(Japan) Scuderia Forme				Ret	0

==== LMGT2 standings ====
Pos.	Drivers	Team	SUG	FUJ	MOT	OKA	Points
1	(Japan) Kouji Aoyama (Japan) Morio Nitta (Japan) Shinichi Takagi	(Japan) Team Kawamura	**1**	**1**	**1**	**2**	19
2	(Japan) Hideo Fukuyama (Japan) Yukinori Taniguchi	(Japan) Hitotsuyama Racing	2	2	3	1	16
3	(Japan) Yukihiro Hane	(Japan) Hitotsuyama Racing			3	1	8
4	(Japan) Yasuo Miyagawa	(Japan) Hitotsuyama Racing	2	2			8
5	(Japan) "Dragon" (Japan) Yoshiaki Nakayama (Japan) Motoyoshi Yoshida	(Japan) 910 Racing	NC	3	2	Ret	7
NC	(Japan) Masahiro Fujino (Japan) Tadakazu Kojima	(Japan) Scuderia Forme	Ret				0

=== Teams' Championship ===
==== LMP1 standings ====
Pos.	Team	SUG	FUJ	MOT	OKA	Points
1	(Japan) Hitotsuyama Racing	1	1	1	2	19
2	(Japan) Team Mugen	**1**	**NC**	**NC**	**1**	9

Colour	Result
Gold	Winner
Silver	Second place
Bronze	Third place
Green	Points classification
Blue	Non-points classification
Blue	Non-classified finish (NC)
Purple	Retired, not classified (Ret)
Red	Did not qualify (DNQ)
Red	Did not pre-qualify (DNPQ)
Black	Disqualified (DSQ)
White	Did not start (DNS)
White	Withdrew (WD)
White	Race cancelled (C)
Blank	Did not practice (DNP)
Blank	Did not arrive (DNA)
Blank	Excluded (EX)

**Bold** – Pole
Italic – Fastest Lap

==== LMP2 standings ====
Pos.	Team	SUG	FUJ	MOT	OKA	Points
1	(Japan) AIM Sports	**1**	**1**	**2**	**1**	19
2	(Japan) Max Racing	2	2	1	3	16
3	(Japan) Jidousya Koubou Myst				2	4
NC	(Japan) Forward Racing			NC		0
NC	(Japan) Rs Serizawa			Ret		0

==== LMGT1 standings ====
Pos.	Team	SUG	FUJ	MOT	OKA	Points
1	(Japan) Hitotsuyama Racing	**1**	**1**	1	**1**	20
2	(Japan) Scuderia Forme		2	**Ret**	Ret	4
NC	(Japan) Arktech Motor Sports	NC				0
NC	(Japan) Zipspeed		Ret			0

==== LMGT2 standings ====
Pos.	Team	SUG	FUJ	MOT	OKA	Points
1	(Japan) Team Kawamura	**1**	**1**	**1**	**2**	19
2	(Japan) Hitotsuyama Racing	2	2	3	1	16
3	(Japan) 910 Racing	NC	3	2	Ret	7
NC	(Japan) Scuderia Forme	Ret				0
