= 2007 Fuji 1000 km =

The 2007 Fuji 1000 km was an endurance sportscar racing event held on 2 June 2007 at Fuji Speedway, as the second of four rounds of the 2007 Japan Le Mans Challenge.

== Results ==
Layout of Fuji Speedway

=== Race results ===
Class winners are denoted in bold.

Pos	Class	No	Team	Drivers	Chassis	Laps
Pos	Class	No	Team	Drivers	Engine	Laps
1	**LMP1**	**22**	**(Japan) Hitotsuyama Racing**	**(Japan) Hideki Noda** **(Japan) Shinsuke Yamazaki**	**Zytek 04S**	**219**
1	**LMP1**	**22**	**(Japan) Hitotsuyama Racing**	**(Japan) Hideki Noda** **(Japan) Shinsuke Yamazaki**	**Zytek ZV348 3.4 L V8**	**219**
2	**LMP2**	**18**	**(Japan) AIM Sports**	**(Japan) Yuji Aso** **(Japan) Masaru Tomizawa** **(Japan) Yoshitaka Kuroda**	**Dallara GC21**	**204**
2	**LMP2**	**18**	**(Japan) AIM Sports**	**(Japan) Yuji Aso** **(Japan) Masaru Tomizawa** **(Japan) Yoshitaka Kuroda**	**Toyota 3S-GTE 2.0 L Turbo I4**	**204**
3	**GT2**	**27**	**(Japan) Team Kawamura**	**(Japan) Koji Aoyama** **(Japan) Shinichi Takagi** **(Japan) Morio Nitta**	**Ferrari F430 GT**	**201**
3	**GT2**	**27**	**(Japan) Team Kawamura**	**(Japan) Koji Aoyama** **(Japan) Shinichi Takagi** **(Japan) Morio Nitta**	**Ferrari F136 GT 4.0 L V8**	**201**
4	LMP2	15	(Japan) Max Racing	(Japan) Toshiya Itou (Japan) Masayuki Ueda (Japan) Kazuyoshi Takamizawa	RS KK-LM	197
4	LMP2	15	(Japan) Max Racing	(Japan) Toshiya Itou (Japan) Masayuki Ueda (Japan) Kazuyoshi Takamizawa	Honda K20K ? L I4	197
5	GT2	20	(Japan) Hitotsuyama Racing	(Japan) Hideo Fukuyama (Japan) Yasuo Miyagawa (Japan) Yukinori Taniguchi	Porsche 997 GT3 RSR	197
5	GT2	20	(Japan) Hitotsuyama Racing	(Japan) Hideo Fukuyama (Japan) Yasuo Miyagawa (Japan) Yukinori Taniguchi	Porsche M97/80 3.8 L Flat-6	197
6	**GT1**	**21**	**(Japan) Hitotsuyama Racing**	**(Japan) Akira Iida** **(Japan) Tomonobu Fujii**	**Ferrari 550 Maranello GTS**	**193**
6	**GT1**	**21**	**(Japan) Hitotsuyama Racing**	**(Japan) Akira Iida** **(Japan) Tomonobu Fujii**	**Ferrari F133 5.9 L V12**	**193**
7	GT2	910	(Japan) 910 Racing	(Japan) Yoshiaki Nakayama (Japan) "Dragon" (Japan) Motoyoshi Yoshida	Porsche 996 GT3-R	192
7	GT2	910	(Japan) 910 Racing	(Japan) Yoshiaki Nakayama (Japan) "Dragon" (Japan) Motoyoshi Yoshida	Porsche M96/79 3.6 L Flat-6	192
8	GT1	7	(Japan) Scuderia Forme	(Japan) Tadakazu Kojima (Japan) Masahiro Fujino	Porsche 996 GT3-R	170
8	GT1	7	(Japan) Scuderia Forme	(Japan) Tadakazu Kojima (Japan) Masahiro Fujino	Porsche M96/79 3.6 L Flat-6	170
DNC	LMP1	16	(Japan) Team Mugen	(Japan) Seiji Ara (Japan) Daisuke Itou	Courage LC70	130
DNC	LMP1	16	(Japan) Team Mugen	(Japan) Seiji Ara (Japan) Daisuke Itou	Mugen MF458S 4.5 L V8	130
DNF	GT1	4	(Japan) Zipspeed	(Japan) Akira Yoshitomi (Japan) Takaya Tsubobayashi	Chevrolet Corvette	3
DNF	GT1	4	(Japan) Zipspeed	(Japan) Akira Yoshitomi (Japan) Takaya Tsubobayashi	Chevrolet ? L V8	3
