= Dallara GC21 =

Prototype race car

- Constructor: Dallara

Technical specifications
- Engine: Toyota 3S-GTE 1,998 cc (121.9 cu in) I4 turbocharged mid-mounted
- Transmission: 6-speed

Competition history
- Debut: 2002 Fuji Grand Champion Series, Race 1
Races	Wins
32	25 (6 class victories in the JLMC, including one outright win)
- Teams' Championships: 1: (2006 JLMC)
- Drivers' Championships: 1: (2006 JLMC)

The Dallara GC21 was a Le Mans Prototype built by Dallara for the Fuji Grand Champion Series, and based on one of the company's Formula Three cars. It was raced between 2002 and 2007, competing in the LMP2 class of the Japan Le Mans Challenge in the last two years of its usage. A GC21, entered by MYZ, won the LMP2 category of the Japan Le Mans Challenge in 2006.

== History ==
In 2002, the Fuji Grand Champion Series was revived, under the GC21 name. Dallara were tasked with building a car for the series, and converted one of their Formula Three cars into the Le Mans Prototype-style Dallara GC21. The GC21 featured the distinctive air intake of a F3 car, but was fitted with a 2-litre, turbocharged Toyota 3S-GTE straight-four engine, in place of the naturally-aspirated units used in F3.

The car's first race came in July 2002, the first of four races that year, all of which were held at the Fuji Speedway circuit. Jerome Dalla Lana, driving for Inging, became the first driver to win in the car, with all five entries finishing the twelve lap event. By the final race of the season, held in November, the grid had expanded to eight cars, with Ronnie Quintarelli, also driving for Inging, winning the event. Only once did a GC21 retire in 2002; Naozumi Itou retired from race three after three laps.

2003 saw the series expand to a five-race event, all of which were held at the Fuji Speedway track. Shinsuke Yamazaki, driving for Aim Sports, won the first event, held in March, with six cars being entered. Each of the following events had seven entries. The final race of the season saw the first mechanically attributed retirement; the privateer Kazuhiko Yatsu suffered a gearbox failure after five laps, in a race where Yamazaki won again. Yamazaki won three races that year, and took two further second places on the way to securing the title.

For 2004, the closure of Fuji Speedway as part of a Hermann Tilke redesign of the circuit forced the series to move. As a result, four races were held at the road course of Twin Ring Motegi, as well as one at Sportsland Sugo. Hiroki Saga, driving for MYG, won four races on the way to the title, with the other race being won by Nova Engineering's Katsuaki Kubota. However, the entry list had decreased, with no more than five drivers competing in any of the races. Fuji Speedway reopened in 2005, and the GC-21 series returned there for all five races of the season. Team I Line's Hiroaki Ishiura was dominant, winning all five races.

In 2006, the Japan Le Mans Challenge (JLMC) was run for the first time, and the GC21 competed in that series in the LMP2 category, as well as the GC-21 series, which continued for one final season. Yasuo Miyagawa won two races of the GC21 series whilst driving for RS Serizawa whilst Atsushi Katsumata won three races driving for MYG. In the JLMC, MYZ entered two GC21 in the season opener, which was the Sugo 1000 km, whilst Aim Sports entered a single GC21. The MYZ entries didn't have any success; the #3 car, driven by Masayuki Yamamoto, Syougo Suhou and Jun'ichirou Yamashita retired, whilst the #4 car, driven by Yuuya Sakamoto, Yoshihisa Namekata and Tomonobu Fujii wasn't classified. However, the Aim Sports car, driven by Shinsuke Yamazaki, Yuuji Asou and Masaru Tomizawa, took the LMP2 class win, and finished second overall. At the Motegi 1000 km, the two team's finishes were reversed: the Aim Sports entry retired due to engine failure, whilst both MYZ entries finished; the #4 MYZ car took the class win, and finished second overall, whilst the #3 MYZ car finished third overall. The #4 MYZ car won the LMP2 category again at the season finale, which was the Okayama 1000 km, whilst both of the other GC21s retired. As a result, MYZ won the LMP2 Team's Championship, and Sakamoto, Namekata and Fujii won the LMP2 Driver's Championship.

2007 saw the JLMC expand to a four-race series, whilst the GC21 was discontinued. For the season opener, which was the Sugo 1000 km, two GC21s were entered; one by Kazuyoshi Takamizawa, and one by Aim Sports, who entered Tomizawa, Asou and Yoshitaka Kuroda. Although Takamizawa did not attend the event, Aim Sports did, and finished fourth, winning the LMP2 category. Aim Sports were the only GC21 in the Fuji 1000 km, and once more won their class, finishing second overall. Three GC21s were entered in the Motegi 1000 km; the regular Aim Sports car was complemented by an entry from Forward Racing, who had Takuya Shirasaka and Takeshi Itou driving for them, as well as an entry from Rs Serizawa, who ran Hiroshi Koizumi, Tsubasa Kurosawa and Hiroaki Ishiura in their GC21. For the first time in the series, the LMP2 category was won by another car; the Max Racing-entered RS KK-LM won the class. The Aim Sports GC21 finished fifth overall, and second in class, whilst the Forward Racing entry was not classified, and the Rs Serizawa entry retired. Aim Sports were once again the only entry in the season finale, which was the Okayama 1000 km; the team took an overall victory for the first time, beating the Team Mugen Courage LC70 LMP1 by just over 28 seconds. This would prove to be both the car's, and the series', last race, as the JLMC was cancelled shortly after the Okayama 1000 km had finished.
