= Sportsland Sugo =

Motorsport track in Japan

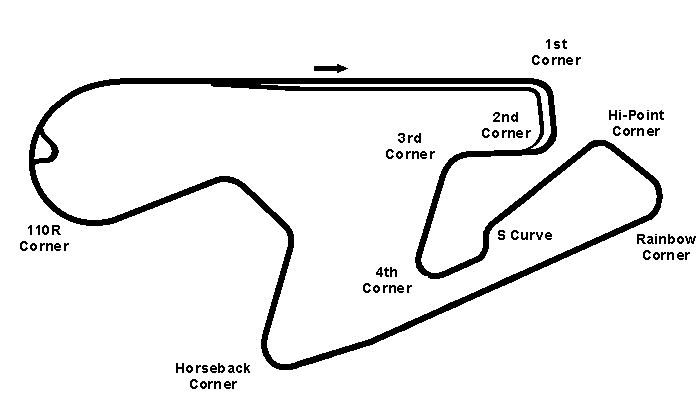
- International Car Circuit (1987–present)
- Location: Murata, Shibata District; Miyagi Prefecture Japan
- Coordinates: 38°08′18.50″N 140°46′41.55″E
- Capacity: 50,000
- FIA Grade: 2
- Owner: Yamaha Motor Co., Ltd.
- Operator: Sugo Co., Ltd.
- Opened: May 1975; 51 years ago
- Major events: Current: Super GT (1994–2019, 2021–present); Super Formula (1987–present); Super Taikyu (????–present); Japan Cup Series (2022, 2024–2026); FR Japan (2020–present); Former: Asia Road Racing Championship (2022–2023); World SBK (1988–2003); Motocross World Championship (2005–2007); GT World Challenge Asia (2022); Japan Le Mans Challenge (2006–2007); All-Japan Sports Prototype Championship (1990–1992); Fuji Grand Champion Series (1988–1989)
- Website: https://sportsland-sugo.co.jp/en/

International Car Circuit (1987–present)
- Length: 3.704 km (2.302 mi)
- Turns: 12
- Race lap record: 1:06.350 ( (New Zealand) } Nick Cassidy, Dallara SF19, 2020, Super Formula)

International Motorcycle Circuit (1987–present)
- Length: 3.737 km (2.322 mi)
- Turns: 15
- Race lap record: 1:25.465 ( (Japan) Ryo Mizuno, Ducati Panigale V4 R, 2026, SBK)

Original Circuit (1975–1986)
- Length: 2.600 km (1.616 mi)
- Turns: 6
- Race lap record: 0:47.110 ( (Japan) Kunimitsu Takahashi, Porsche 962 C, 1985, Group C)

Sportsland Sugo (スポーツランドSUGO, Supōtsurando Sugo) is a motorsports facility in the town of Murata, Shibata District, Miyagi Prefecture, Japan.

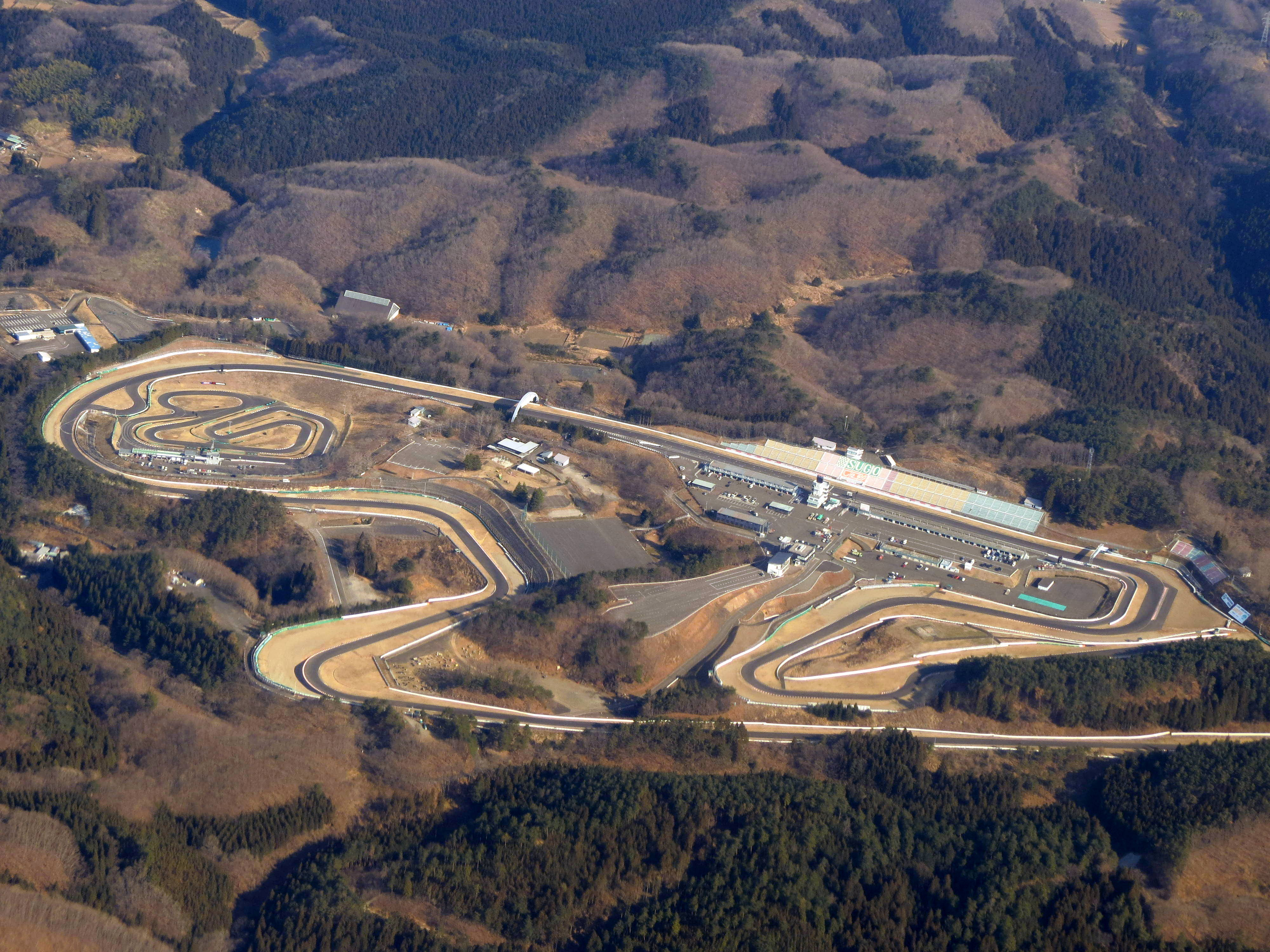
Aerial view of the circuit

== Course ==
The track was opened in 1975 and is one of the largest motorsports facilities in Japan, with a total area of 2.1 million m². It offers four specialized race courses - a road racing course, a motocross course, a trials course, and a go-kart course. The track is owned by the Yamaha Motor Company. The total length is 3.704 km (2.302 mi) with the longest straight of 704.5 m (2,311 ft). Width is 10–12.5 m (33–41 ft) and has a total elevation change of 69.83 m (229.1 ft) per lap.

== Access ==
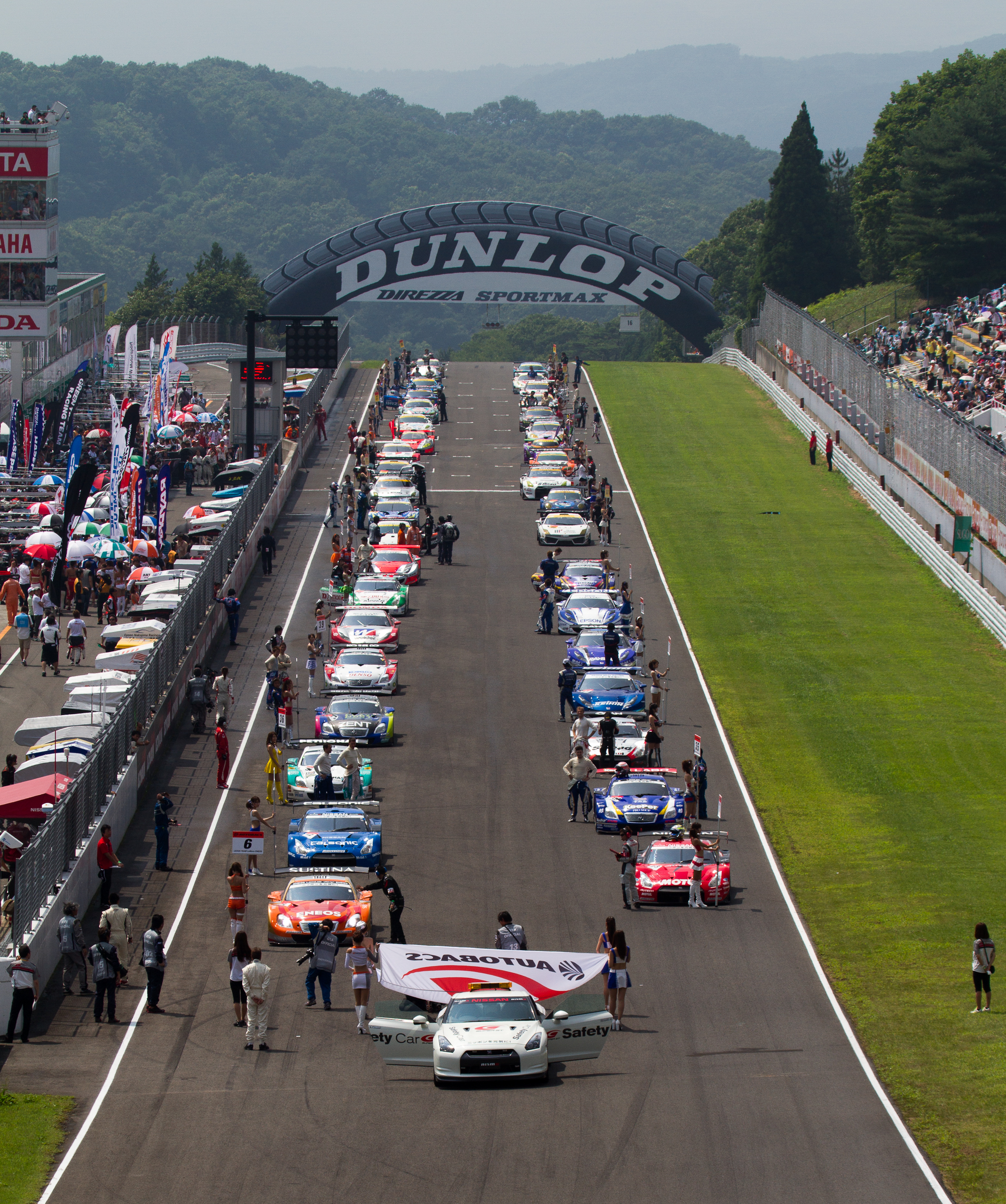
Starting grid at the 2012 Sugo Super GT race

- Tohoku Expressway

About 10 minutes from Murata IC It takes about 20 minutes from Sendai Minami IC via Miyagi Prefectural Road No. 31 Sendai Murata Line.

== Events ==
Annual racing events at the facility include:

- Super GT;
- Super Formula;
- MFJ Superbikes All Japan Road Race Championship; and
- Super Taikyu.

The facility also used to host a Superbike World Championship round from 1988 until 2003, and a D1 Grand Prix event.

Current

- April: MFJ Superbikes All Japan Road Race Championship
- May: Japan Cup Series
- July: Super Taikyu
- August: Super Formula Championship, Super Formula Lights, Porsche Carrera Cup Japan, Formula Regional Japanese Championship
- September: Super GT, F4 Japanese Championship

Former

- All-Japan Sports Prototype Championship (1990–1992)
- Asia Road Racing Championship (2022–2023)
- Ferrari Challenge Japan (2023–2024)
- Formula Challenge Japan (2007–2009)
- Fuji Grand Champion Series (1988–1989)
- GC-21 (2004)
- GT World Challenge Asia (2022)
- Japan Le Mans Challenge (2006–2007)
- Japanese Touring Car Championship (1985–1998)
- Long Distance Series (1991–1992)
- Motocross World Championship (2005–2007)
- Superbike World Championship (1988–2003)
- Supersport World Championship (1997, 2000–2003)
- TCR Japan Touring Car Series (2019–2023)

== Lap records ==
As of April 2026, the fastest official race lap records at the Sportsland Sugo are listed as:

Category	Time	Driver	Vehicle	Event
International Car Circuit (1987–present): 3.704 km (2.302 mi)
Super Formula	1:06.350	Nick Cassidy	Dallara SF19	2020 Sugo Super Formula round
Formula Nippon	1:08.740	Hiroaki Ishiura	Swift FN09	2011 Sugo Formula Nippon round
Group C	1:10.629	Mauro Martini	Jaguar XJR-14	1991 SUGO Inter 500 Miles
F3000	1:11.519	Takuya Kurosawa	Lola T92/50	1992 Sugo Japanese F3000 round
Super GT (GT500)	1:12.079	Hiroki Otsu	Honda Civic Type R-GT	2025 Sugo GT 300km
Super Formula Lights	1:12.571	Ritomo Miyata	Dallara 320	2020 Super Formula Lights Sugo round
LMP900	1:14.316	Hideki Noda	Zytek 04S	2006 Sportsland Sugo 1000 km
Formula Three	1:14.457	Sacha Fenestraz	Dallara F314	2019 Sugo Japanese F3 round
LMP1	1:14.827	Shinji Nakano	Courage LC70	2007 Sportsland Sugo 1000 km
Prototype	1:17.060	Takao Wada	Mad House F4	1989 Sugo Grand Champion
Formula Regional	1:17.574	Tokiya Suzuki	Dome F111/3	2025 Sugo FRJC round
Super GT (GT300)	1:18.945	Hiroki Yoshimoto	Lexus LC 500 GT	2025 Sugo GT 300km
GT3	1:19.959	Ukyo Sasahara	Ferrari 296 GT3	2025 Sugo SRO Japan Cup round
Formula Challenge Japan	1:21.794	Yuichi Nakayama	Tatuus FC106	2009 Sugo Formula Challenge Japan round
Porsche Carrera Cup	1:22.200	Reimei Ito	Porsche 911 (992 I) GT3 Cup	2024 Sugo Porsche Carrera Cup Japan round
Formula 4	1:23.802	Itsuki Sato	Toray Carbon Magic MCSC-24	2025 Sugo Japanese F4 round
GT1	1:23.862	Ralf Schumacher	McLaren F1 GTR	1996 SUGO GT Championship
Ferrari Challenge	1:24.029	Yudai Uchida	Ferrari 488 Challenge Evo	2024 Sugo Ferrari Challenge Japan round
Formula Toyota	1:24.486	Kazuya Oshima	Tom's FT30	2005 2nd Sugo Formula Toyota round
TCR Touring Car	1:26.777	Tobio Otani	Audi RS 3 LMS TCR (2021)	2023 Sugo TCR Japan round
GT4	1:27.037	Seita Nonaka	Toyota GR Supra GT4 Evo 2	2025 Sugo SRO Japan Cup round
Super Touring	1:27.541	Michael Krumm	Toyota Corona EXiV	1996 Sugo JTCC round
Group A	1:28.162	Anders Olofsson	Nissan Skyline GT-R BNR32	1992 Sugo JTCC round
LMP2	1:34.056	Hiroki Saga	Dallara GC21	2004 Sugo GC-21 round
International Motorcycle Circuit (1987–present): 3.737 km (2.322 mi)
Superbike	1:25.465	Ryo Mizuno	Ducati Panigale V4 R	2026 Sugo All Japan Road Race Championship round
World SBK	1:29.108	Makoto Tamada	Honda VTR 1000 SP2	2002 Sugo World SBK round
Supersport	1:29.301	Kengo Nagao	Yamaha YZF-R6	2025 Sugo All Japan Road Race Championship round
World SSP	1:33.015	Fabien Foret	Honda CBR600F	2002 Sugo World SSP round
Moto3	1:34.188	Shun Takenaka	Honda NSF250R	2026 Sugo All Japan Road Race Championship round
Asia Productions 250	1:38.682	Aldi Satya Mahendra	Kawasaki Ninja 250R	2023 Sugo ARRC round
Supersport 300	1:41.434	Taishi Katada	Yamaha YZF-R3	2026 Sugo All Japan Road Race Championship round
Asia Underbone 150	1:45.620	Ahmad Fazrul Sham	Yamaha Y15 ZR	2023 Sugo ARRC round
Original Circuit (1975–1986): 2.600 km (1.616 mi)
Group C	0:47.110	Kunimitsu Takahashi	Porsche 962 C	1985 Super Sports Sugo
