= Hitotsuyama Racing =

Japanese racing team

Hitotsuyama Racing 一ツ山レーシング
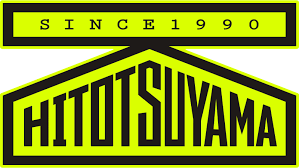
- Founded: 1990
- Base: Shizuoka Prefecture, Japan
- Team principal(s): Ryoji Hitotsuyama
- Founder(s): Mikio Hitotsuyama; Yasushi Hitotsuyama
- Current series: Super Taikyu; SRO Japan Cup; Formula Regional Japanese Championship
- Former series: Japanese Touring Car Championship; Super GT; Japan Le Mans Challenge; Asian Le Mans Series; Intercontinental GT Challenge; TCR Japan Touring Car Series; World Touring Car Cup; F4 Japanese Championship; GT World Challenge Asia
- Current drivers: Super Taikyu ST-3: Kenji Suzuki; Masashi Fujii; Sean Walkinshaw; Munehisa Ijima; Ryoji Tashiro; Daisuke Yamawaki; Frank Yu Siu Fung; Joe Chi Fang-Quan; Shinsuke Umeda; SRO Japan Cup: Shintaro Kawabata; Akihiro Tsuzuki; Jake Parsons; Jesse Swinimer
- Teams' Championships: SRO Japan Cup: 2025, 2026; TCR Japan Touring Car Series: 2020; Super Taikyu – ST-X: 2011; Japan Le Mans Challenge – LMP1: 2007; Japan Le Mans Challenge – LMGT1: 2006, 2007

Hitotsuyama Racing is a Japanese racing team currently competing in SRO Japan Cup and the ST-3 class of Super Taikyu. The team formerly competed in the GT500 and GT300 classes of Super GT.

== History ==
Team founders Mikio Hitotsuyama and Yasushi Hitotsuyama had been racing drivers in the 1970s, but temporarily took a step back from motorsport to focus on their Yamaichi Transport & Warehouse business. In 1990, Hitotsuyama Racing began its racing ventures, with Mikio making his debut in the Japanese Touring Car Championship. After six seasons in the series, Hitotsuyama Racing joined the All Japan Grand Touring Car Championship (known as Super GT from 2005) in 1996.

Debuting in the GT300 class with a BMW M3 (E36), the team achieved its first podium at the Mine finale on its debut year with Kenji Yamamoto and Mikio Hitotsuyama at the wheel. Continuing in the class for the next three seasons, Hitotsuyama's maiden stint in GT300 was highlighted by a fourth-place points finish in 1998, in which it scored a podium at Fuji with Hiroki Katoh and Yasushi Hitotsuyama. In 2000, Hitotsuyama Racing stepped up to the GT500 class with a McLaren F1 GTR, with Akihiko Nakaya for the full-season, while Yasushi Hitotsuyama drove for most of the season. Spending six seasons in the category, which included two seasons with the Ferrari 550 GTS, Hitotsuyama Racing scored a lone podium from pole at Motegi in 2002 with Naoki Hattori and Eiichi Tajima to take 11th in points with the F1 GTR.

In 2006, Hitotsuyama Racing switched to the newly-created Japan Le Mans Challenge, fielding a car in the LMP1 and LMGT1 classes. In the two seasons the JLMC ran, Hitotsuyama Racing won the LMGT1 title in both years, as well as the LMP1 title in 2007. In 2009, the team returned to the GT500 class of Super GT, under the Team Nova banner, fielding an Aston Martin DBR9 in select rounds for Akihiro Tsuzuki and Takeshi Tsuchiya to prepare for the Asian Le Mans Series. In the two-race AsLMS season at Okayama, Hitotsuyama Team Nova secured the win in race two with the Tsuzuki-Tsuchiya duo.

Three years later, Hitotsuyama Racing made its full-time return to Super GT with an Audi R8 LMS driven by Tsuzuki alongside Cyndie Allemann and Richard Lyons, who shared the second seat. In 2014, Hitotsuyama Racing began a partnership with Audi Japan and began racing as Audi Team Hitotsuyama with Lyons and Tomonobu Fujii, a season in which the team scored a lone podium at Sugo. After a podium at Okayama in 2015, Hitotsuyama Racing had a breakthrough season in 2016, winning at Motegi with Fujii-Lyons and securing third in the teams' standings.

Alongside its Super GT commitments, Hitotsuyama Racing also raced at Suzuka 10 Hours in 2018 and 2019, established the A1 Fan Cup, as well as making its debut in TCR Japan and a one-off appearance in the World Touring Car Cup in 2019. In the team's three-year stint in TCR competition, Hitotsuyama Racing most notably secured the TCR Japan Touring Car Series team's championship in 2020 with Takuro Shinohara.

In 2020, Hitotsuyama Racing was set to field Audi factory driver Christopher Mies full-time in Super GT alongside Shintaro Kawabata, but was replaced by Tsubasa Kondo after Covid-19 restrictions left Mies unable to enter Japan. Despite the last-minute change in line-up, the team scored its second Super GT win at Suzuka to jump up to tenth in points. The following year, Kawabata was partnered up with Takuro Shinohara, scoring a surprise third win for Hitotsuyama Racing at Motegi, before the team left the series ahead of 2022.

During its final season in Super GT and TCR Japan in 2021, Hitotsuyama Racing returned to Super Taikyu, making a one-off appearance at the Fuji 24 Hours in the ST-X class with its R8 LMS. While Hitotsuyama Racing continued in Super Taikyu for 2022, albeit switching to ST-Z with an R8 LMS GT4, the team competed in its only season in the F4 Japanese Championship with Daiki Fujiwara, as well as a one-off appearance in GT World Challenge Asia with Tsuzuki and Motohiro Ogura at Fuji.

As the team continued its ST-Z programme, Hitotsuyama Racing switched to a Mercedes-AMG GT4 in 2024, the same year it joined the SRO Japan Cup in 2024, helping run GAMA 83 Racing in the GTC class. For 2025, Hitotsuyama Racing brought back its Audi R8 LMS Evo II to compete in the ST-X class alongside its existing programme in ST-Z, as well as a brief return to single-seaters with Anna Inotsume in the Formula Regional Japanese Championship. Between the three campaigns, Hitotsuyama Racing most notably scored two overall podiums with its ST-X entry, as it finished fifth in the teams' standings with a best result of second at Autopolis. In parallel, Hitotsuyama Racing partnered with Cornes Racing to field a Ferrari 296 GT3 in the SRO Japan Cup for Kawabata and Tsuzuki, taking a lone win at Fuji, as well as securing the overall and Pro-Am GT3 titles.

In 2026, Hitotsuyama Racing remained in the SRO Japan Cup to defend its title with its Ferrari, as well as running newcomers AWD Racing with their Audi R8 LMS Evo II, whereas in Super Taikyu, the team fielded a lone BMW M2 Racing in the ST-3 class. In the former, Hitotsuyama sealed their second consecutive drivers' and teams' titles with their Kawabata-Tsuzuki pairing.

== Former series results ==
=== JGTC ===
(key) (Races in bold indicate pole position) (Races in italics indicate fastest lap)

Year	Car	Tyres	Class	No.	Drivers	1	2	3	4	5	6	7	8	Pos	Pts
1996	BMW M3 (E36)	D	GT300	21	(Japan) Kenji Yamamoto (Japan) Fuminori Mizuno (Japan) Yasushi Hitotsuyama (Japan) Mikio Hitotsuyama	SUZ; 8	FUJ; Ret	SEN; 6	FUJ; 6	SUG; 7	MIN; 3			8th	31
1997	BMW M3 (E36)	D	GT300	21	(Japan) Yasushi Hitotsuyama (Japan) Takayuki Kinoshita (Japan) Kenji Yamamoto (Japan) Mikio Hitotsuyama (Japan) Mizuno Fuminori	SUZ; Ret	FUJ; 10	**SEN**; 10	FUJ; Ret	MIN; Ret	SUG; 7			15th	6
1998	BMW M3 (E36)	D	GT300	21	(Japan) Hiroki Katoh (Japan) Yasushi Hitotsuyama (Japan) Mikio Hitotsuyama (Japan) Takayuki Kinoshita	SUZ; Ret	FUJ; C	SEN; 5	FUJ; 3	MOT; 5	MIN; 5	SUG; 5		4th	44
1999	BMW M3 (E36)	T	GT300	21	(Japan) Daisuke Ito (Japan) Yasushi Hitotsuyama (Japan) Mikio Hitotsuyama	SUZ; 12	FUJ; NC	SUG; 12	MIN; 7	FUJ; 9	OKA; 14	MOT; DNA		16th	6
2000	McLaren F1 GTR	D	GT500	21	(Japan) Akihiko Nakaya (Japan) Yasushi Hitotsuyama (Japan) Mikio Hitotsuyama	MOT; 14	FUJ; 11	SUG; Ret	FUJ; Ret	OKA; 17	MIN; 10	SUZ; Ret		15th	1
2001	McLaren F1 GTR	D	GT500	21	(Japan) Akihiko Nakaya (Japan) Mitsuhiro Kinoshita (Japan) Yasushi Hitotsuyama (Japan) Naoki Hattori (Japan) Mikio Hitotsuyama	OKA; 10	FUJ; 13	SUG; Ret	FUJ; 11	MOT; Ret	SUZ; Ret	MIN; 11		13th	1
2002	McLaren F1 GTR	D	GT500	76	(Japan) Naoki Hattori (Japan) Eiichi Tajima	OKA; 13	FUJ; 8	SUG; 6	SEP; 8	FUJ; 13	**MOT**; 3	MIN; Ret	SUZ; Ret	11th	27
2002	BMW M3 CSL	D	GT300	21	(Japan) Yasushi Kikuchi (Japan) Mikio Hitotsuyama (Japan) Yasushi Hitotsuyama	OKA; 16	FUJ; 8	SUG; 8	SEP; 19	FUJ; 20	MOT; 14	MIN; Ret	SUZ; Ret	13th	6
2003	McLaren F1 GTR	D	GT500	76	(Japan) Eiichi Tajima (Japan) Yudai Igarashi (Japan) Haruki Kurosawa (Japan) Go Shimizu	OKA; 13	FUJ; 9	SUG; 12	FUJ; 18	FUJ; 14	MOT; Ret	AUT	SUZ; 15	14th	2
2003	BMW M3 CSL	D	GT300	21	(Japan) Mikio Hitotsuyama (Japan) Takeshi Namekawa (Japan) Yasushi Hitotsuyama (Japan) Haruhiko Matsumoto	OKA; Ret	FUJ; Ret	SUG; 14	FUJ; DNQ	FUJ; DNQ	MOT; DNA	AUT	SUZ	NC	0
2004	Ferrari 550 GTS	D	GT500	21	(Japan) Hidetoshi Mitsusada (Japan) Tadao Uematsu	OKA; 15	SUG; DNQ	SEP; 13	TOK; 16	MOT; 14	AUT; 15	SUZ; 14		NC	0

=== Super GT ===
(key) (Races in bold indicate pole position) (Races in italics indicate fastest lap)

Year	Car	Tyres	Class	No.	Drivers	1	2	3	4	5	6	7	8	9	Pos	Points
2005	McLaren F1 GTR	D	GT500	20	(Japan) Eiichi Tajima (Japan) Yasushi Hitotsuyama (Japan) Mikio Hitotsuyama	OKA	FUJ; DNS	SEP	SUG	MOT	FUJ; 17	AUT	SUZ		NC	0
2005	Ferrari 550 GTS	D	GT500	21	(Japan) Takuya Kurosawa (Japan) Hidetoshi Mitsusada	OKA; Ret	FUJ; Ret	SEP; Ret	SUG; 12	MOT; Ret	FUJ; 15	AUT; 13	SUZ; 15		NC	0
2009	Aston Martin DBR9	Y	GT500	21	(Japan) Akihiro Tsuzuki (Japan) Takeshi Tsuchiya	OKA; 14	SUZ	FUJ; 14	SEP	SUG	SUZ	FUJ; 14	AUT	MOT	15th	3
2012	Audi R8 LMS	Y	GT300	20	(Japan) Hideki Noda (United States) Michael Kim (Japan) Kenji Kobayashi (Hong Kong) Frank Yu	OKA; 18	FUJ; 16	SEP	SUG	SUZ	FUJ	AUT	MOT		28th	2
2012	Audi R8 LMS	Y	GT300	21	(Japan) Akihiro Tsuzuki (Switzerland) Cyndie Allemann (United Kingdom) Richard Lyons (Japan) Yukinori Taniguchi	OKA; 9	FUJ; 15	SEP; 14	SUG; Ret	SUZ; 14	FUJ; Ret	AUT; 6	MOT; 9		17th	21
2012	Audi R8 LMS	Y	GT300	77	(Ukraine) Igor Sushko (Japan) Kenji Kobayashi	OKA	FUJ	SEP	SUG	SUZ	FUJ	AUT	MOT; 18		29th	1
2012	Audi R8 LMS	Y	GT300	99	(Hong Kong) Frank Yu (Japan) Hideto Yasuoka (United States) Michael Kim (Japan) Yoshio Tsuzuki	OKA	FUJ	SEP; 15	SUG	SUZ; Ret	FUJ	AUT; Ret	MOT		26th	3
2013	Audi R8 LMS ultra	H	GT300	21	(Japan) Akihiro Tsuzuki (United Kingdom) Richard Lyons	OKA; 16	FUJ; Ret	SEP; 14	SUG; 8	SUZ; 11	FUJ; 13	FUJ	AUT; 21	MOT; 21	18th	19
2014	Audi R8 LMS ultra	Y	GT300	21	(Japan) Tomonobu Fujii (United Kingdom) Richard Lyons (Netherlands) Carlo van Dam (Germany) Christopher Haase	OKA; 8	FUJ; 14	AUT; 18	SUG; 3	FUJ; 23	SUZ; Ret	CHA; Ret	MOT; 4		13th	34
2015	Audi R8 LMS ultra	Y	GT300	21	(Japan) Tomonobu Fujii (United Kingdom) Richard Lyons (Monaco) Stéphane Ortelli	OKA; 3	FUJ; Ret	CHA; 19	FUJ; 20	SUZ; 5	SUG; 13	AUT; 5	MOT; 8		11th	45
2016	Audi R8 LMS	D	GT300	21	(Japan) Tomonobu Fujii (United Kingdom) Richard Lyons	OKA; 7	FUJ; 7	SUG; Ret	FUJ; 2	SUZ; 6	CHA; 24	MOT; 1	MOT; 4		3rd	76
2017	Audi R8 LMS	D	GT300	21	(United Kingdom) Richard Lyons (Japan) Masataka Yanagida	OKA; 14	FUJ; 14	AUT; 13	SUG; 20	FUJ; 10	SUZ; Ret	**CHA**; 23	MOT; 8		19th	21
2018	Audi R8 LMS	D	GT300	21	(United Kingdom) Richard Lyons (Japan) Ryuichiro Tomita (Japan) Takuro Shinohara	OKA; Ret	FUJ; 10	SUZ; 23	CHA; Ret	FUJ; 14	SUG; 23	AUT; 14	MOT; 11		22nd	15
2019	Audi R8 LMS Evo	Y	GT300	21	(United Kingdom) Richard Lyons (Japan) Ryuichiro Tomita (Belgium) Alessio Picariello	OKA; 13	FUJ; 8	SUZ; 8	BUR; 13	FUJ; 13	AUT; 13	SUG; 7	MOT; 27		17th	30
2020	Audi R8 LMS Evo	Y	GT300	21	(Japan) Shintaro Kawabata (Japan) Tsubasa Kondo	FUJ; 17	FUJ; 8	SUZ; 25	MOT; 5	FUJ; 14	SUZ; 1	MOT; 13	FUJ; 12		10th	51
2021	Audi R8 LMS Evo	Y	GT300	21	(Japan) Shintaro Kawabata (Japan) Takuro Shinohara	OKA; 13	FUJ; 17	MOT; 16	SUZ; 21	SUG; 25	AUT; 15	MOT; 1	FUJ; 17		14th	42

^{‡} Half points awarded as less than 75% of race distance was completed. * Season still in progress.

== Timeline ==
Current series
A1 Fun Cup	2019–present
Super Taikyu Series	2011, 2021–present
SRO Japan Cup	2024–present
Formula Regional Japanese Championship	2025–present
Former series
Japanese Touring Car Championship	1990–1997
Super GT	1996–2005, 2009, 2012–2021
Japan Le Mans Challenge	2006–2007
Asian Le Mans Series	2009
Intercontinental GT Challenge	2018–2019
TCR Japan Touring Car Series	2019–2021
World Touring Car Cup	2019
F4 Japanese Championship	2022
GT World Challenge Asia	2022
