= Mad House F4 =

Racecar

Mad House F4-Mugen
- Category: Fuji Grand Champion
- Constructor: Lola (originally)

Technical specifications
- Chassis: Carbon fiber composite honeycomb monocoque
- Suspension (front): independent unequal double wishbones, push-rod actuated coil springs over shock absorbers
- Suspension (rear): independent double wishbones, control links, push-rod actuated coil springs over shock absorbers, anti-roll bar
- Axle track: 66 in (1,676 mm) (front); 61.5 in (1,562 mm) (rear)
- Wheelbase: 100 in (2,540 mm)
- Engine: Mugen MF308 3.0 L (183 cu in) DOHC V8 naturally-aspirated mid-engined
- Torque: 276 lb⋅ft (374 N⋅m) @ 6,900 rpm
- Transmission: 5-speed manual
- Power: 450 hp (336 kW) @ 9,000 rpm
- Weight: 540 kg (1,190 lb) (including driver)
- Tyres: Yokohama

Competition history

The Mad House F4 is a closed-wheel sports prototype race car, used in the Fuji Grand Champion sports car racing series, in 1989. Based on the Lola T88/50 Formula 3000 car, it was powered by a Mugen MF308 3.0 L (180 cu in) V8 engine, and ran on Yokohama tires.
