= Japan Le Mans Challenge =

Japanese automobile race

- Country: Japan
- Inaugural season: 2006
- Folded: 2007
- Prototype classes: LMP1, LMP2
- GT classes: GT1, GT2

The Japan Le Mans Challenge (abbreviated JLMC) was an endurance sportscar series based in Japan built around the 24 Hours of Le Mans that began in 2006. It was run by the Sports Car Endurance Race Operation (SERO) sanctioning body and ran under the rules laid out by the Automobile Club de l'Ouest (ACO). It is the first endurance sportscar series in Japan since the demise of the All Japan Sports Prototype Championship in 1992, although the ACO had run a single endurance race since then, the 1999 Le Mans Fuji 1000 km. The series was cancelled in 2007 following two poor seasons.

== Rules ==
The rules for the JLMC were based around the rules used by the ACO for the 24 Hours of Le Mans endurance race in France, similar to those used by the Le Mans Series in Europe and the American Le Mans Series in North America. Cars were broken into two general classes, known as Le Mans Prototypes (LMP) and Grand Touring (GT). These classes were further broken down into a larger, more powerful class and a cheaper, less powerful class, which created four classes: LMP1, LMP2, GT1, and GT2. All four classes raced at the same time on the same track, with a winner being declared for each class as well as an overall race winner. Points were based on finishing position are awarded for overall championships amongst drivers, teams, and engine builders. However, unlike the two other Le Mans-based series, the JLMC allowed cars which did not meet ACO guidelines in an attempt to increase the number of entrants. This was allowed with the belief that by 2008, JLMC would fully adapt to ACO rules and run fully compliant cars.

The ACO planned to also grant automatic entries to the 24 Hours of Le Mans for the teams that win the season championships in each class. However, due to the use of cars which do not meet ACO guidelines, this plan for invitations was also moved to 2008.

== History ==
During the brief two seasons of the Japan Le Mans Challenge, the series struggled to provide grids similar to those in the American Le Mans Series and Le Mans Series. Most races averaged approximately 12 cars total, with only a few meeting actual LMP and GT regulations. Mugen Motorsports backed an LMP1 entry using one of their engines, while Hitotsuyama Racing attempted to increase field size by entering cars in two of the four classes. The LMP2 class however consisted entirely of rebodied single seaters, some of these were modified Dallara F3s from the domestic GC21 Championship. Even with some factory support and proven Le Mans cars, most teams struggled to survive the 1000 kilometer race distances. The first two races of the 2006 season were won by a Hitotsuyama Ferrari 550 Maranello in the GT1 class, while the two proper LMP1s failed to finish. It was not until the final race of 2006 that Mugen's LMP managed to earn an overall victory.

For 2007, Hitotsuyama's Zytek LMP1 managed to prove reliable enough to earn the first three victories of the season, before it once again struggled to finish in the final race of the year, leaving an LMP2 GC21 to take overall victory. During that 2007 season, SERO announced that they were relinquishing control of the series due to their failure to promote it and increase not only grid size, but also fan viewership. The ACO initially announced that they were to take over the series for 2008. However, shortly after this announcement, the ACO announced their intentions to cancel the series entirely, citing a continued lack of participants as well as being unable to make contracts with circuits over the lack of ticket sales.

== Asian Le Mans Series ==
The ACO announced a new Asian-based sports car series in 2009, which will encompass all of Asia in an attempt to increase support from outside Japan. A teasing race was to be held at the Shanghai International Circuit on November 1–2, 2008 but was later cancelled. The initial 2009 season comprised at least four three-hour races: two at Okayama International Circuit on October 30–November 1, and the other two at Shanghai on November 7–8, which was later cancelled due to economic reasons. The winners would be awarded entries for the 2010 24 Hours of Le Mans. The ACO aimed to attract teams from ALMS, LMS and the Super GT. Following the cancellation of the Shanghai race, the Asian Le Mans series would not be held again until 2013, this time following the ELMS class structure (with additional classes for Group GT3 and Super GT GT300 cars), but the series continued to struggle from entry list issues until ACO took over the organisation of the series at the end of 2014 season.

== Champions ==
=== Drivers' ===
Season	LMP1	LMP2	LMGT1	LMGT2
2006	(Japan) Takahiko Shimazawa	(Japan) Yuya Sakamoto (Japan) Yoshihisa Namekata (Japan) Tomonobu Fujii	(Japan) Tatsuya Kataoka (Japan) Naoki Hattori (Japan) Eiichi Tajima	(Japan) Koji Aoyama (Japan) Shinichi Takagi (Japan) Morio Nitta
2007	(Japan) Hideki Noda (Japan) Shinsuke Yamazaki	(Japan) Yuji Aso (Japan) Masaru Tomizawa	(Japan) Tomonobu Fujii (Japan) Akira Iida	(Japan) Kouji Aoyama (Japan) Morio Nitta (Japan) Shinichi Takagi

=== Teams' ===
Season	LMP1	LMP2	LMGT1	LMGT2
2006	(Japan) Jidousya Koubou Myst	(Japan) MYZ	(Japan) Hitotsuyama Racing	(Japan) Team Kawamura
2007	(Japan) Hitotsuyama Racing	(Japan) AIM Sports	(Japan) Hitotsuyama Racing	(Japan) Team Kawamura

== See also ==
- 1999 Le Mans Fuji 1000 km
- Fuji Grand Champion Series
- Fuji Long Distance Series
