= Zytek ZB408 engine =

Zytek ZB408

Overview
- Manufacturer: (United Kingdom) Gibson
- Production: 2000–2007

Layout
- Configuration: 90° V8 naturally-aspirated
- Displacement: 4.0 L (244 cu in)
- Valvetrain: Dual overhead camshaft (DOHC)

Combustion
- Fuel system: Electronic indirect multi-point injection
- Fuel type: Elf LMS 102 RON unleaded Gasoline; E10 Ethanol

Output
- Power output: 650 hp (485 kW)
- Torque output: 435 lb⋅ft (590 N⋅m)

Dimensions
- Dry weight: 135 kg (298 lb)

Chronology
- Successor: Zytek ZG348

The Zytek ZB408 engine is a 4.0-litre, normally-aspirated, DOHC, V8 racing engine which has been developed and produced by Zytek for sports car racing since 2000.

== Applications ==
- Zytek 05S
- Panoz LMP07
