= Koji Aoyama =

Japanese baseball player (born 1983)

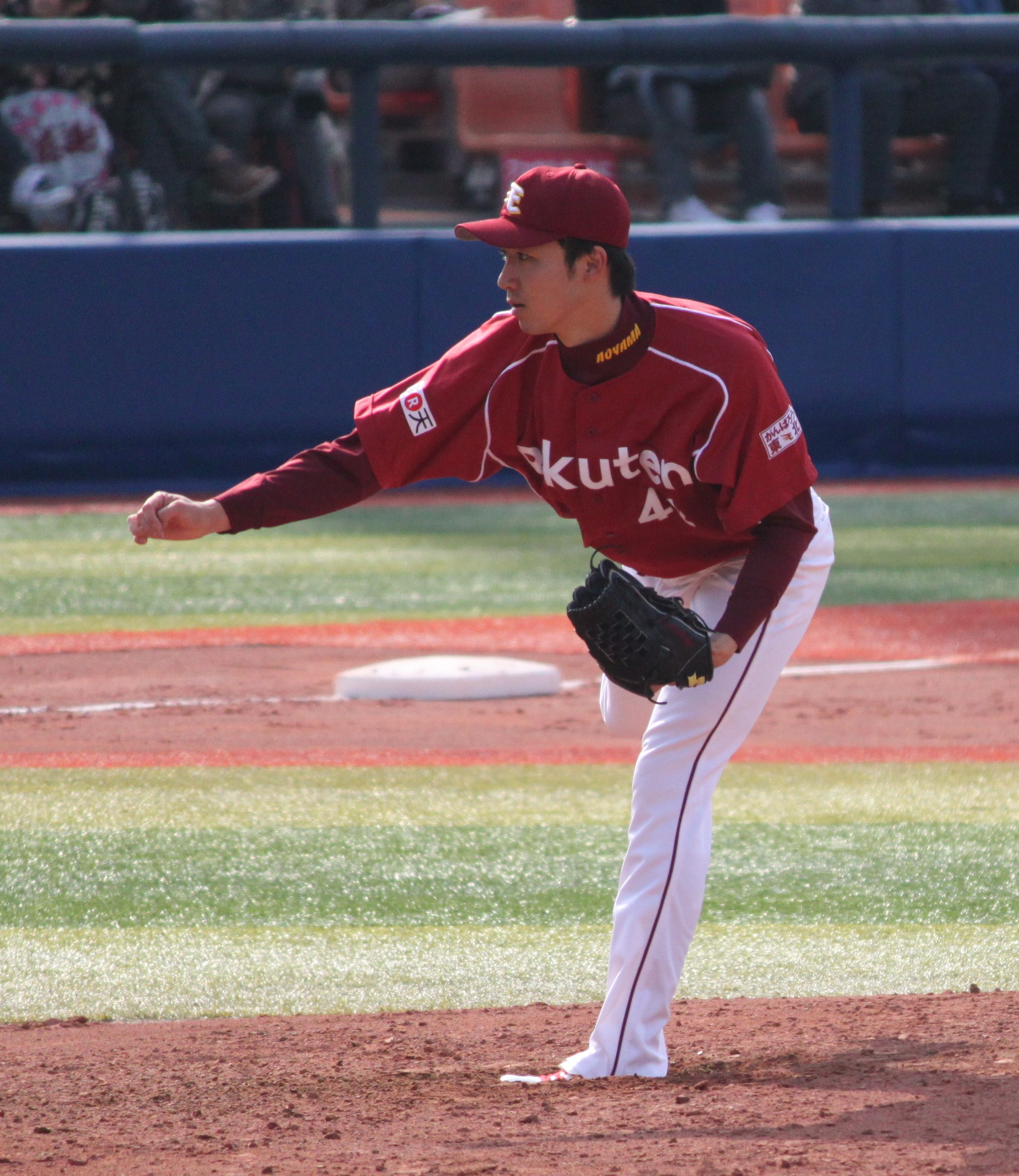
- Aoyama with the Tohoku Rakuten Golden Eagles

Tohoku Rakuten Golden Eagles – No. 81
- Pitcher / Coach
- Born: August 12, 1983 (age 42); Hakodate, Hokkaido, Japan
- Batted: Right Threw: Right

NPB debut
- March 25, 2006, for the Tohoku Rakuten Golden Eagles

Last NPB appearance
- September 29, 2020, for the Tohoku Rakuten Golden Eagles

NPB statistics
- Win–loss record: 42-58
- ERA: 3.67
- Strikeouts: 713
- Saves: 45
- Stats at Baseball Reference

Teams
- As player: Tohoku Rakuten Golden Eagles (2006–2020); As coach: Tohoku Rakuten Golden Eagles (2024–present)

Career highlights and awards
- 2× NPB All-Star (2012–2013); 1× Japan Series champion (2013)

Koji Aoyama (青山 浩二, born August 12, 1983) is a Japanese former professional baseball pitcher. He played in Nippon Professional Baseball (NPB) from 2006 to 2020 for the Tohoku Rakuten Golden Eagles.

== Career ==
Tohoku Rakuten Golden Eagles selected Aoyama with the third selection in the 2005 NPB draft.

On March 25, 2006, Aoyama made his NPB debut.

On November 21, 2020, Aoyama announced his retirement.
