= Courage LC70 =

Le Mans Prototype race car

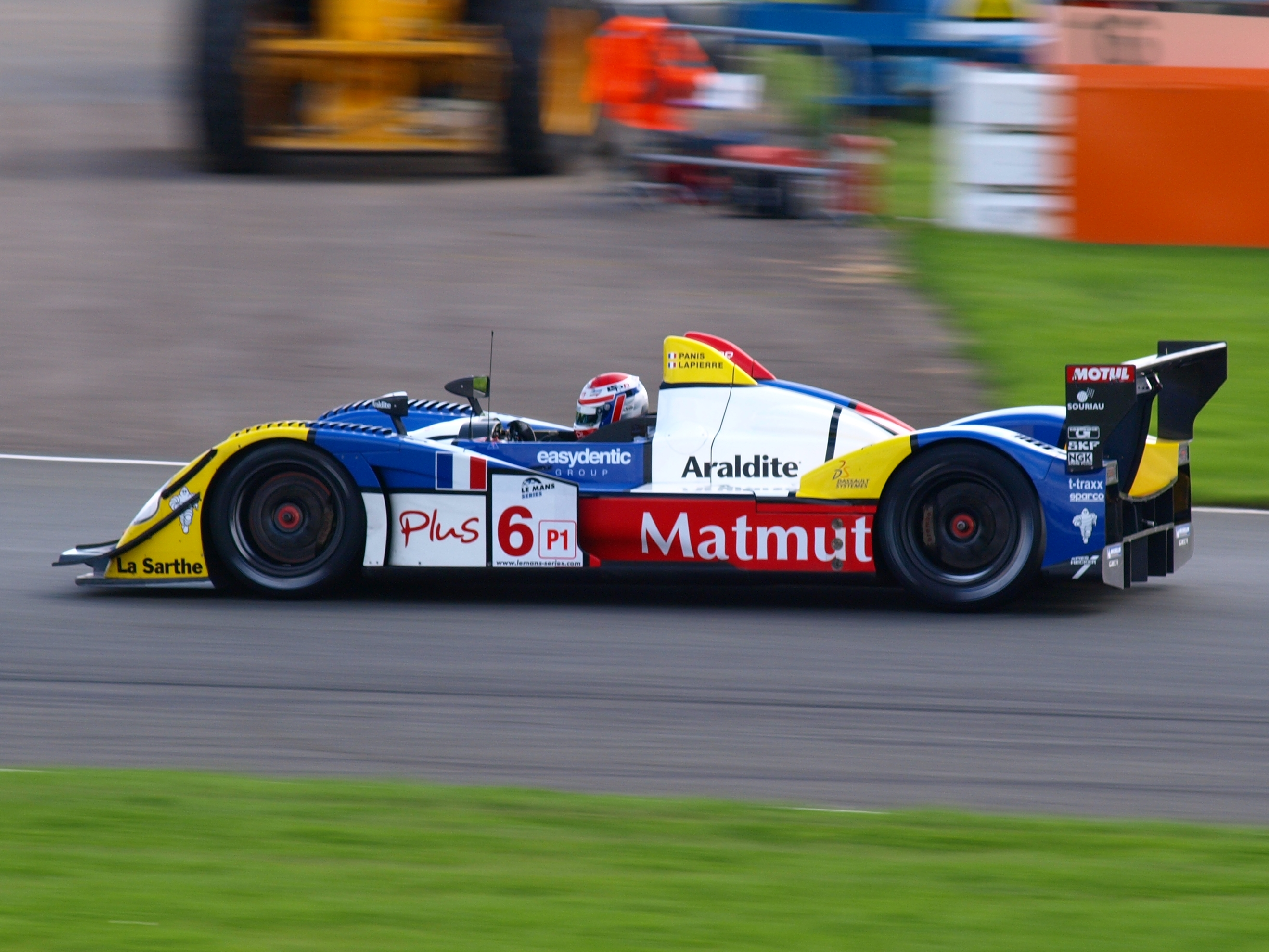
An LC70 at the 2008 Silverstone 1000km race

The Courage LC70 is a Le Mans prototype of the LMP1 class developed by Courage Competition and used in sports car racing since 2006. Although the name Courage remembers F1 driver Piers Courage, it’s due to the founder of Courage Compétition : Yves Courage. During development, however, Courage Compétition has been taken over by ORECA, so the original name Courage LC70 has been changed. The Courage-ORECA LC75 is almost identical in construction but was designed for the LMP2 class. Other modifications of the LC75 are the Acura ARX-01a and Acura ARX-01b, which has been used in the American Le Mans Series since 2007. The type designation LC stands for Lillian Courage, the wife of Yves Courage who died in 2004.

== Racing history ==
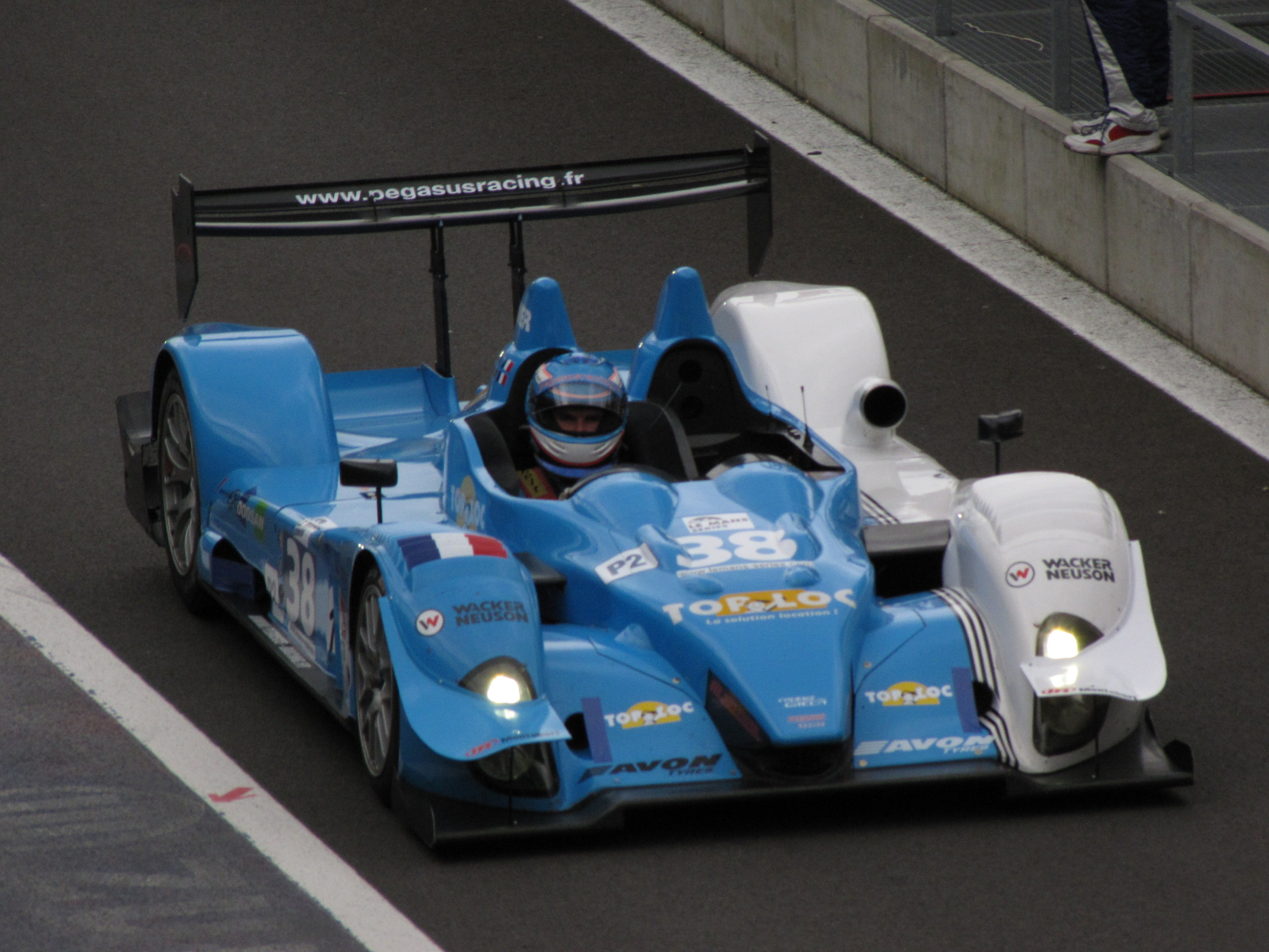
An LC75 at the 2009 Spa-Francorchamps 1000km race

The LC70 has been used since 2006 by Courage Compétition and ORECA itself, as well as teams such as Swiss Spirit and Saulnier Racing. In addition to being used in the 24 Hours of Le Mans, the chassis is primarily used in the Le Mans Series. The LC70, equipped with a Judd V10, made its racing debut in the hands of Swiss Spirit at 1000 km of Istanbul in 2006. Courage Competition itself relied on a brand new V8 unit from Mugen. In 2008, at the second round of the Le Mans Series in Monza, Stéphane Ortelli had a serious accident when his LC70 under-inflated before the first chicane and took off.

The LC70 was also successful on other continents. An LC70 used by Mugen was able to win the 1000 km of Okayama in the Japan Le Mans Challenge twice. The Courage chassis were also successful in North America, albeit modified LC75s under the Acura banner.

== Achievements ==
=== 2006 ===
- 1000 km Spa-Francorchamps: 2nd overall (2nd LMP1)
- 1000 km Donington: 5th overall (4th LMP1)
- 1000 km Jarama: 3rd overall (2nd LMP1)
- 1000 km Okayama : 1st overall (1st LMP1)
- 24 Hours of Le Mans: no car finished

=== 2007 ===
- 1000 km Monza: 5th overall (5th LMP1)
- 1000 km Okayama: 1st overall (1st LMP1)
- 24 Hours of Le Mans: 26th overall (12th LMP1)

=== 2008 ===
- 1000 km Monza: 6th overall (6th LMP1)
- 1000 km Spa: 3rd overall (3rd LMP1)
- 1000 km Nürburgring: 6th overall (6th LMP1)
- 1000 km Silverstone: 8th overall (7th LMP1)
- 24 Hours of Le Mans: 8th overall (8th LMP1)
- Le Mans Series: 6th Constructors' Championship LMP1

== Design ==
The vehicle was developed in accordance with the ACO and FIA rules applicable in 2005 so that it is eligible to start in all sports car races up to and including 2010. Courage officially unveiled the prototype at the 2006 Geneva Motor Show. The car has been designed to compete in both the LMP1 and LMP2 classes with minor modifications. The LC70 thus also forms the basis for the smaller sister car, the Courage-ORECA LC75 for the LMP2. The six-speed gearbox used comes from Xtrac. The engines are sourced from various suppliers such as AER, Mugen, or Judd.

For 2008 the aerodynamics of the LC70 has been significantly revised by ORECA. For example, the central air intake at the front was converted into two lateral ones in the wheel arches. In addition, the front spoiler has been heavily modified. The project by students from Tokai University brought further significant changes. They modified the entire aerodynamics and only adopted the underbody and monocoque for their Le Mans participation in 2008. They also used a YGK engine for the first time.

== Chassis ==
All built chassis of the LC70 or the LC75 were numbered consecutively, since they are largely identical. So chassis 2 was converted from LC70 to type LC75. When Acura officially entered the American Le Mans Series in 2007, three LC75 chassis were purchased, but these were used as the Acura ARX-01a and in 2008 as the Acura ARX-01b. In 2008 another chassis was added for De Ferran Motorsports. The chassis were also further developed by Acura itself.

No.	Year	Type	Team	Engine	Racing Series
1	2006		Courage Compétition		Development & Testing
1	2007	LC75	Noel Del Bello Racing	AER	LMS& Le Mans
1	2008	LC75	ORECA		Development & Testing
1	2009	LC75	Pegasus Racing	AER	LMS
2	2006	LC70	Swiss Spirit	Judd	LMS & Le Mans
2	2007	LC75	Saulnier Racing	AER	LMS & Le Mans
2	2009	LC75	Ibanez Racing Service	AER	LMS
3	2006	LC70	Courage Compétition	Mugen	LMS & Le Mans
3	2007	LC70	Courage Compétition	AER	LMS & Le Mans
3	2008	LC70	Team Oreca Matmut	Judd	LMS
4	2007	LC70	Courage Compétition	Mugen	Le Mans
4	2007	LC70	Courage Compétition	AER	LMS & Le Mans
5	2006	LC70	Courage Compétition	Mugen	LMS
5	2006	LC70	Team Mugen	Mugen	JLMC
5	2007	LC70	Team Mugen	Mugen	JLMC
5	2008	LC70	Terramos	Mugen	Le Mans
6	2008	LC70	Tōkai-Universität	YGK	Le Mans
7	2007	ARX-01a	Highcroft Racing	Acura	ALMS
7	2008	ARX-01b	Highcroft Racing	Acura	ALMS
8	2007	ARX-01a	Andretti Green Racing	Acura	ALMS
8	2008	ARX-01b	Andretti Green Racing	Acura	ALMS
9	2007	ARX-01a	Honda Performance Development	Acura	test vehicle only
9	2008	ARX-01b	Fernández Racing	Acura	ALMS
9	2009	ARX-01b	Fernández Racing	Acura	ALMS
9	2010	ARX-01b	Strakka Racing	Acura	
10	2007	LC70	Courage Compétition	AER	LMS
10	2008	LC70	Team Oreca Matmut	Judd	LMS & Le Mans
10	2009	LC70 / ORECA 01	Team Oreca Matmut	AIM	LMS
11	2008	LC70	Team Oreca Matmut	Judd	LMS & Le Mans
11	2009	LC70	Signature-Plus	Judd	LMS & Le Mans
12	2008	ARX-01b	De Ferran Motorsports	Acura	ALMS
13	2008	LC70	Team Oreca Matmut	Judd	LMS
13	2009	LC70 / ORECA 01	Team Oreca Matmut	AIM	LMS
