= 2021 Super Taikyu Series =

Japanese sports car racing season

The 2021 Super Taikyu Series Powered by Hankook was the thirty-first season of the Super Taikyu Series endurance racing championship. It began on 21 March at Twin Ring Motegi and ended on 14 November at Okayama International Circuit.

D'station Racing won the championship in the series' GT3 category, known as ST-X, with an Aston Martin Vantage AMR GT3.

This was the first season for the new ST-Q class, introduced for manufacturer-developed, non-homolgated special racing vehicles. In this class, Toyota and ROOKIE Racing introduced the Toyota Corolla H2 Concept, a hydrogen internal combustion engine vehicle based upon the Toyota Corolla Sport hatchback. This car made its racing debut at the Fuji SUPER TEC 24 Hours. Mazda debuted the Mazda Demio Bio Concept in the final round at Okayama, which ran on renewable biodiesel fuel.

== Calendar ==
A provisional calendar was announced on 20 November 2020, featuring six rounds at six Japanese motor racing circuits. Twin Ring Motegi moved back to the first round of the championship in March. Following the cancellation of the 2020 round at Suzuka Circuit, its date was moved to September and became the fifth round of the season.

The Fuji 24 Hours was moved from its original dates of 5-6 June to 22-23 May, in order to avoid a clash with 24 Hours of Le Mans test day and the 24 Hours of Nürburgring.

Round	Event	Race Length	Race Format	Circuit	Date
1	Motegi Super Taikyu 5 Hours Race	5 hours	1 race	Twin Ring Motegi	20–21 March
2	Sugo Super Taikyu 3 Hour Race	3 hours	2 races	Sportsland Sugo	17–18 April
3	NAPAC Fuji SUPER TEC 24 Hours Race	24 hours	1 race	Fuji Speedway	21–23 May
4	TKU Super Taikyu Race in Autopolis	5 hours	1 race	Autopolis	31 July–1 August
5	Suzuka S-Tai	5 hours	1 race	Suzuka Circuit	18–19 September
6	Super Taikyu Race in Okayama	3 hours	2 races	Okayama International Circuit	26–27 October

== Teams and drivers ==
64 cars entered throughout the course of the 2021 season. All entries were registered under a Japanese license.

No.	Entrant	Vehicle	Engine	Drivers
ST-X (FIA GT3 homologated vehicles)
9	MP Racing (Rd. 1-4, 6)	Nissan GT-R NISMO GT3 (MY18)	Nissan VR38DETT 3.8 L twin-turbocharged V6	(Japan) Joe Shindo (Japan) Yusaku Shibata (Japan) Masami Kageyama (Japan) Keiichi Inoue (Rd. 1-4) (Japan) Tsugio Matsuda (Rd. 3) (Japan) Yuya Motojima (Rd. 3) (Japan) Ryuichiro Tomita (Rd. 6)
16	Porsche Center Okazaki (Rd. 1-2, 4-6)	Porsche 911 GT3 R (991.2)	Porsche 4.0 L flat-6	(Japan) Hiroaki Nagai (Japan) Yuta Kamimura (Japan) Yuichi Nakayama
31	apr	Lexus RC F GT3	Toyota 2UR-GSE 5.0 L V8	(Japan) Hideki Nagai (Japan) Koki Saga (Japan) Kazuto Kotaka (Japan) Hiroaki Nagai (Rd. 3) (Japan) Yuichi Nakayama (Rd. 3) (Japan) Yuta Kamimura (Rd. 3)
33	Audi Team Hitotsuyama (Rd. 3)	Audi R8 LMS GT3	Audi 5.2 L V10	(Japan) Yoshio Tsuzuki (Japan) Ritomo Miyata (Japan) Motohiro Ogura (Japan) Tetsusaburo Tanaka (Japan) Hideo Honda (Japan) Akihiro Tsuzuki
81	GTNET Motor Sports	Nissan GT-R NISMO GT3 (MY18)	Nissan VR38DETT 3.8 L twin-turbocharged V6	(Japan) Noboyuki Oyagi (Japan) Takayuki Aoki (Japan) Kiyoto Fujinami (Japan) Ryuichiro Oyagi (Rd. 1-2, 4-6) (Japan) Natsu Sakaguchi (Rd. 3)
270	Floral Racing with ABSSA	McLaren 720S GT3	McLaren M840T 4.0 L twin-turbocharged V8	(Japan) Keita Sawa (Japan) Shintaro Kawabata (Japan) Tadao Uematsu (Rd. 1-3, 5-6) (Japan) Yuji Ide (Rd. 1-3, 5) (Japan) Yuki Kawahara (Rd. 3) (Japan) Teruhiko Hamano (Rd. 4)
777	D'station Racing (Rd. 1-5)	Aston Martin Vantage AMR GT3	Mercedes-Benz M177 4.0 L twin-turbocharged V8	(Japan) Satoshi Hoshino (Japan) Tomonobu Fujii (Japan) Tsubasa Kondo
999	CarGuy Racing (Rd. 3)	Honda NSX GT3 Evo	Honda JNC1 3.5 L twin-turbocharged V6	(Japan) Takeshi Kimura (Japan) Kei Cozzolino (Japan) Shinya Michimi
ST-Z (RACB GT4 homologated vehicles)
3	Endless Sports	Mercedes-AMG GT4	Mercedes-Benz M159 4.0 L twin-turbocharged V8	(Japan) Yudai Uchida (Japan) Hideki Yamauchi (Japan) Togo Suganami (Japan) Ryo Ogawa (Rd. 1, 3-5)
20	SS/YZ Racing with Studie	BMW M4 GT4 (F82)	BMW S55 3.0 L twin-turbocharged V6	(Japan) Tomohide Yamaguchi (Japan) Seiji Ara (Japan) Yuya Sakamoto (Brazil) João Paulo de Oliveira (Rd. 3)
22	Porsche Team EBI Waimarama	Porsche 718 Cayman GT4 Clubsport	Porsche 3.8 L Flat-6	(Japan) Kizuna (Japan) Katsumasa Chiyo (Japan) Naoya Yamano (Japan) Riki Okusa (Japan) Tetsuya Yamano (Rd. 3) (France) Giuliano Alesi (Rd. 3)
23	TKRI (Rd. 1-2, 4-6)	Mercedes-AMG GT4	Mercedes-Benz M159 4.0 L twin-turbocharged V8	(Japan) Daisuke (Japan) Yuya Motojima (Japan) Takaaki Hamada (Rd. 1, 6)
30	B-Max Engineering (Rd. 1-3)	Mercedes-AMG GT4	Mercedes-Benz M159 4.0 L twin-turbocharged V8	(Japan) Nobuhiro Imada (Japan) Dragon (Japan) Yuhi Sekiguchi (Japan) Mitsunori Takaboshi (Rd. 3) (Japan) Teppei Natori (Rd. 3)
34	Techno First (Rd. 1-2, 6)	Ginetta G55 GT4	Ford 3.7 L V6	(Japan) Yuki Tanaka (Japan) Hironobu Yasuda (Japan) Shinnosuke Yamada
47	D'station Racing	Aston Martin Vantage AMR GT4	Mercedes-Benz M177 4.0 L twin-turbocharged V8	(Japan) Tatsuya Hoshino (Japan) Manabu Orido (Japan) Takuro Shinohara (Japan) Kenji Hama (Rd. 2-6) (Japan) Yuhki Nakayama (Rd. 3)
70	Comet Racing	Mercedes-AMG GT4 (Rd. 1-2)	Mercedes-Benz M159 4.0 L twin-turbocharged V8	(Japan) Masaaki Fujii (Japan) Naoki Yokomizo (Japan) Kazuhiro Sakai (Japan) Hajime Noma
77	Comet Racing	Mercedes-AMG GT4 (Rd. 1)	Mercedes-Benz M159 4.0 L twin-turbocharged V8	(Japan) Yorikatsu Tsujiko (Japan) Kei Cozzolino (Japan) Yusuke Yamasaki (Japan) Takeshi Kimura
108	Close Up Racing (Rd. 2-6)	Toyota GR Supra GT4	BMW B58B30 3.0 L twin-turbocharged I6	(Japan) Takeshi Matsumoto (Japan) Toshio Suzuki (Japan) Jun Fujii (Rd. 2-4) (Japan) Takuya Kurosawa (Rd. 2-4) (Japan) Seiya Jin (Rd. 3, 5)
111	Hiroshima Toyopet Racing (Rd. 1-2, 4-6)	Toyota GR Supra GT4	BMW B58B30 3.0 L twin-turbocharged I6	(Japan) Toshiyuki Matsuda (Japan) Yuga Furutani (Japan) Yasutaka Hinoi (Japan) Ryō Hirakawa (Rd. 1-2, 4-5)
170	Birth Racing Project (Rd. 6)	Porsche 718 Cayman GT4 Clubsport	Porsche 3.8 L Flat-6	(Japan) Kenji Suzuki (Japan) Kohei Fukuda (Japan) Yuki Fujii (Japan) Koichi Okumura
311	C.S.I Racing (Rd. 1-2, 4-6)	Toyota GR Supra GT4	BMW B58B30 3.0 L twin-turbocharged I6	(Japan) Hirokazu Suzuki (Japan) Yusuke Shiotsu (Japan) Kimiya Sato (Japan) Rintaro Kubo (Rd. 1-2, 5-6)
500	Team 5Zigen	Mercedes-AMG GT4	Mercedes-Benz M159 4.0 L twin-turbocharged V8	(Japan) Ryuichiro Otsuka (Japan) Toshihiro Kaneishi (Australia) Jake Parsons (Rd. 1-4) (Japan) Kakunoshin Ohta (Rd. 1, 3, 5-6) (Japan) Yu Kanamaru (Rd. 3-4)
505	Audi Team AS Sport (Rd. 1-3, 5-6)	Audi R8 LMS GT4	Audi 5.2 L V10	(Japan) Genki Nishimura (Hong Kong) Shaun Thong (Japan) Takeshi Okamoto (Rd. 1-2) (Japan) Yoshinari Fujiwara (Rd. 1, 3) (Japan) Shozo Tagahara (Rd. 2-3, 5-6)
885	Hayashi Telempu SHADE Racing	Toyota GR Supra GT4	BMW B58B30 3.0 L twin-turbocharged I6	(Japan) Hiro Hayashi (Japan) Katsuyuki Hiranaka (Japan) Ai Miura (Japan) Shinnosuke Yamada (Rd. 3)
ST-TCR (TCR homologated vehicles)
33	Audi Driving Experience Japan (Rd. 6)	Audi RS 3 LMS TCR	Audi 2.0 L turbocharged I4	(Japan) Daisuke Imamura (Japan) Yuki Ano (Japan) Hideki Nakahara
75	Team Noah	Honda Civic Type R TCR (FK7)	Honda K20C1 2.0 L turbocharged I4	(Japan) Yoshikazu Sobu (Japan) Shigetomo Shimono (Japan) Kuniyuki Haga (Rd. 1, 3, 5) (Japan) Riki Tanioka (Rd. 1) (Japan) Toshiro Tsukada (Rd. 2-4, 6) (Japan) Yuji Kiyotaki (Rd. 2-4, 6) (Japan) Masataka Kubo (Rd. 3) (Japan) Shingo Wada (Rd. 5)
97	Racer M&K Racing (Rd. 3-5)	Honda Civic Type R TCR (FK7)	Honda K20C1 2.0 L turbocharged I4	(Japan) Mitsuhiro Endo (Japan) Shinji Nakano (Japan) Syun Koide (Japan) Kenta Harada (Rd. 3-4) (Japan) Ryunosuke Sawa (Rd. 3)
ST-Q (development vehicles approved by the STO)
28	ROOKIE Racing	Toyota GR Supra GT4 (DB42) Prototype	BMW B58B30 3.0 L twin-turbocharged I6	(Japan) Naoya Gamou (Japan) Daisuke Toyoda (Japan) Kenta Yamashita (Japan) Yasuhiro Ogura (Japan) Kazuya Oshima (Rd. 3) (Japan) Shunsuke Kohno (Rd. 3)
32	ROOKIE Racing	Toyota Corolla Sport H2 Concept (Rd. 3-6)	Toyota G16E-GTS 1.6 L turbocharged I3	(Japan) Takuto Iguchi (Japan) Masahiro Sasaki (Japan) Morizo (Japan) Takamitsu Matsui (Japan) Hiroaki Ishiura (Rd. 3) (Japan) Kamui Kobayashi (Rd. 3)
37	Mazda Spirit Racing (Rd. 6)	Mazda Demio Bio Concept	Mazda Skyactiv-D 1.5 L turbocharged I4	(Japan) Kaoru Ijiri (Japan) Ikuo Maeda (Japan) Kazuhiro Terakawa (Japan) Yutaka Seki
ST-1
No.	Entrant	Vehicle		Drivers
2	KTM Cars Japan	KTM X-Bow GTX		(Japan) Taiyo Iida (Japan) Kazuho Takahashi (Japan) Hiroki Katoh (Japan) Hiroki Yoshimoto (Rd. 3-6) (Japan) Takashi Kobayashi (Rd. 3)
8	BMW Team Studie (Rd. 3)	BMW M2 CS Racing		(Japan) Takayuki Kinoshita (Japan) Takashi Ohi (Japan) Jukuchou Sunako (Japan) Kouki Yamada (Japan) Takashi Kochiya
38	Tracy Sports	Toyota GR Supra (DB42)		(Japan) Ryohei Sakaguchi (Japan) Yuui Tsutsumi (Rd. 1-3, 5-6) (Japan) Makoto Hotta (Rd. 1-3, 5-6) (Japan) Sena Sakaguchi (Rd. 3-4)
71	Akiland Racing (Rd. 1-2, 4-6)	Porsche 911 GT3 Cup (991)		(Japan) Masayoshi Oyama (Japan) Kenji Yamamoto (Japan) Makio Saito (Rd. 1, 4-6) (Japan) Tatsuya Tanigawa (Rd. 5)
ST-2 (2,001-3,500cc, front-wheel and all-wheel drive)
6	Shinryo Racing Team	Mitsubishi Lancer Evolution X (CZ4A)		(Japan) Tomohiro Tomimasu (Japan) Yasushi Kikuchi (Japan) Masazumi Ohashi (Japan) Wataru Yamaki (Rd. 3) (Japan) Takahiro Matsuzawa (Rd. 3)
7	Shinryo Racing Team	Mitsubishi Lancer Evolution X (CZ4A)		(Japan) Yoshiki Fujii (Japan) Masato Narisawa (Japan) Keisuke Anzai (Japan) Shingo Imai (Japan) Akiyoshi Shibuya (Rd. 3) (Japan) Hirofumi Okumura (Rd. 3)
13	Endless Sports (Rd. 6)	Toyota GR Yaris (GXPA16)		(Japan) Ryo Ogawa (Japan) Masaya Hanazato
24	GranValley Racing (Rd. 3)	Toyota GR Yaris (GXPA16)		(Japan) Masahiro Ohtani (Japan) Kokuto Kawamura (Japan) Kenichi Hayashi (Japan) Motoaki Yamasaki
32	ROOKIE Racing (Rd. 1-2)	Toyota GR Yaris (GXPA16)		(Japan) Takuto Iguchi (Japan) Masahiro Sasaki (Japan) Morizo (Japan) Takamitsu Matsui
56	Claris Racing (Rd. 2-6)	Toyota GR Yaris (GXPA16)		(Japan) Hideki Katoh (Japan) Kizuku Hirota (Japan) Tomoki Iida (Japan) Chihiro Inagaki (Rd. 1-4) (Japan) Ryo Yamada (Rd. 3, 5-6)
59	TOWAINTEC Racing	Subaru WRX STI (VAB)		(Japan) Manabu Osawa (Japan) Hitoshi Gotoh (Japan) Mizuki Ishizaka (Japan) Hideto Yasuoka (Rd. 3) (Japan) Shunsuke Sato (Rd. 3)
225	Kobe Toyopet Motor Sports	Toyota GR Yaris (GXPA16)		(Japan) Seita Nonaka (Japan) Hibiki Taira (Japan) Miki Onaga (Japan) Kengo Ichijo (Rd. 3-5)
743	Honda R&D Challenge (Rd. 1-3, 6)	Honda Civic Type R (FK8)		(Japan) Junichi Kidachi (Japan) Hiroki Ishigaki (Japan) Kengo Yamamoto (Japan) Hideki Kakinuma (Rd. 1, 3) (Japan) Shinichi Katsura (Rd. 3) (Japan) Tomoko Fujishima (Rd. 3) (Japan) Tetsumei Mochizuki (Rd. 6)
ST-3 (2,001-3,500cc, rear-wheel drive)
15	Okabe Jidosha Motorsport	Nissan Fairlady Z (Z34)		(Japan) Masaaki Nagashima (Japan) Kazuomi Komatsu (Japan) Masaya Kohno (Japan) Masayuki Ueda (Rd. 3) (Japan) Isamu Tabata (Rd. 3) (Japan) Yuga Katsumata (Rd. 3)
35	Techno First (Rd. 6)	Lexus RC 350 (GSC10)		(Japan) Kazuki Oki (Japan) Miku Ikejima (Japan) Shinji Ikegami
39	Tracy Sports with Delta	Lexus RC 350 (GSC10)		(Japan) Yusuke Tomibayashi (Japan) Kazuya Oshima (Japan) Hirotaka Ishii (Rd. 2-6) (Japan) Yoshiyuki Tsuruga (Rd. 3) (Japan) Ryuta Ukai (Rd. 3) (Japan) Akira Suto (Rd. 3)
41	Tracy Sports with Delta	Lexus RC 350 (GSC10)		(Japan) Yuma Shoji (Japan) Yoshihiro Ito (Rd. 1-4) (Japan) Ryuta Ukai (Rd. 1-2, 4-5) (Japan) Takashi Ito (Rd. 3-6) (Japan) Takuya Otaki (Rd. 3) (Japan) Yukihiro Yamaji (Rd. 3) (Japan) Hirohito Ito (Rd. 3) (Japan) Shinichi Hyodo (Rd. 6)
52	Saitama Toyopet GreenBrave	Toyota Crown RS (ARS220)		(Japan) Naoki Hattori (Japan) Hiroki Yoshida (Japan) Kohta Kawaai (Japan) Takayuki Hiranuma (Rd. 1-2) (Japan) Taku Bamba (Rd. 3)
62	HELM Motorsports	Lexus RC 350 (GSC10)		(Japan) Yuya Hiraki (Japan) Reiji Hiraki (Japan) Tomoki Takahashi (Japan) Ryosuke Matsuzawa (Rd. 3)
244	Max Racing	Nissan Fairlady Z (Z34)		(Japan) Tetsuya Tanaka (Japan) Atsushi Miyake (Japan) Toru Tanaka (Rd. 1-5) (Japan) Kimiya Sato (Rd. 3)
ST-4 (1,500-2,000cc)
18	Asano Racing Service (Rd. 1-4, 6)	Toyota 86 (ZN6)		(Japan) Takeo Asano (Japan) Daiki Fujiwara (Japan) Ryo Fukatsu (Rd. 1, 3) (Japan) Masatoshi Fujiwara (Rd. 1) (Japan) Kota Matsui (Rd. 2-4) (Japan) Toshikazu Shiba (Rd. 3, 6) (Japan) Yuya Nakajima (Rd. 3) (Japan) Yasuhiro Ogushi (Rd. 4)
310	C.S.I Racing	Toyota 86 (ZN6)		(Japan) Sho Tsuboi (Japan) Shinya Hosokawa (Japan) Fuma Horio (Japan) Rintaro Kubo (Rd. 3) (Japan) Hirokazu Suzuki (Rd. 3)
884	Hayashi Telempu SHADE Racing	Toyota 86 (ZN6)		(Japan) Yuji Kunimoto (Japan) Keishi Ishikawa (Japan) Eijiro Shimizu (Rd. 2-6) (Japan) Morio Nitta (Rd. 3)
ST-5 (up to 1,500 cc)
4	Team Bride	Honda Fit3 RS (GK5)		(Japan) Yuya Ohta (Japan) Hiroshi Ito (Japan) Hidefumi Minami (Rd. 1-2, 6) (Japan) Seijiro Aihara (Rd. 1-2) (Japan) Takuya Shiga (Rd. 3) (Japan) Soichi Kurosu (Rd. 3) (Japan) Kazuaki Yasui (Rd. 3-5) (Japan) Takao Seto (Rd. 3-4, 6) (Japan) Takuji Okada (Rd. 5)
17	Team NOPRO	Mazda Demio (DE5FS) (Rd. 1-2); Mazda Demio Diesel Turbo (DJ5FS) (Rd. 3-6)		(Japan) Tobio Ohtani (Japan) Masataka Inoue (Japan) Toshihiko Nogami (Japan) Yoshihiro Kato (Rd. 1-5) (Japan) Junichi Agematsu (Rd. 3) (Japan) Hideyoshi Nishizawa (Rd. 3) (Japan) Kazunari Yoshioka (Rd. 6)
37	Team NOPRO	Mazda Demio Diesel Turbo (DJ5FS) (Rd. 1-5)		(Japan) Kaoru Ijiri (Japan) Kazunari Yoshioka (Japan) Yutaka Seki (Japan) Tatsuya Nogami (Rd. 1, 3-5) (Japan) Hiroaki Yamamoto (Rd. 3)
50	Love Drive Racing	Mazda Roadster (ND5RC)		(Japan) Koji Yamanishi (Japan) Hiroyuki Matsumura (Japan) Yoshihito Shinoda (Japan) Takashi Hata (Rd. 3)
78	Love Drive Racing	Mazda Roadster (ND5RC)		(Japan) Junko Fujii (Japan) Jco Iinuma (Japan) Tatsuya Shuto (Rd. 3-4) (Japan) Takahiro Kimura (Rd. 3) (Japan) Hiroki Takenouchi (Rd. 5)
66	Over Drive	Mazda Roadster (ND5RC)		(Japan) Takayuki Takechi (Japan) Tatsuya Ota (Japan) Takahisa Ohno (Japan) Kyosuke Inomata (Japan) Shuichiro Hokazono (Rd. 3) (Japan) Hirobon (Rd. 3)
456	Over Drive	Mazda Roadster (ND5RC)		(Japan) Riku Hashimoto (Japan) Kousei Kanto (Japan) Tatsuya Osaki (Japan) Koji Obara (Rd. 1, 3-4) (Japan) Takafumi Katsuki (Rd. 3, 5) (Japan) Ryosuke Kagami (Rd. 3)
67	Team Yamato (Rd. 2-3, 6)	Honda Fit3 RS (GK5)		(Japan) Ryohei Yasui (Japan) Shinya Uchiyama (Japan) Hideaki Ito (Japan) Ryo Mukumoto (Rd. 2-3)
72	Nihon Automobile College	Mazda Roadster (ND5RC)		(Japan) Makoto Kanai (Japan) Tatsuya Okahara (Rd. 1-4) (Japan) Yasuhiro Matsuo (Rd. 1, 3) (Japan) Misaki Furuta (Rd. 1) (Japan) Anna Inotsume (Rd. 2-6) (Japan) Tatsuya Ishii (Rd. 2) (Japan) Toshihiro Kubota (Rd. 3) (Japan) Hachiro Osaka (Rd. 3) (Japan) Tetsuya Yamano (Rd. 5) (Japan) Mamoru Okada (Rd. 6)
88	Murakami Motors	Mazda Roadster (ND5RC) (Rd. 1-4, 6)		(Japan) Hiroyuki Murakami (Japan) Tatsuya Tanigawa (Japan) Yasunori Nakajima (Rd. 1-3) (Japan) Keiji Amemiya (Rd. 3-4) (Japan) Naoki Yamaya (Rd. 3, 6)
120	Murakami Motors	Mazda Roadster (ND5RC) (Rd. 2, 4, 6)		(Japan) Haruhiko Sugino (Japan) Ikuo Maeda (Rd. 2, 4) (Japan) Kazuhiro Terakawa (Rd. 2, 4) (Japan) Akira Nakamura (Rd. 6) (Japan) Takeshi Wakitani (Rd. 6)
103	HMRacers	Mazda2 (DJLFS)		(Japan) Kota Sasaki (Japan) Tomomitsu Senoo (Japan) Soichiro Yoshida (Rd. 1-3, 5-6) (Japan) Yugo Osaki (Rd. 3-4) (Japan) Ryunosuke Yoshida (Rd. 3)
110	Hiroshima Toyopet Racing (Rd. 6)	Toyota Vitz (NCP131)		(Japan) Ryoji Matsumoto (Japan) Yasunori Matsumoto (Japan) Ryusuke Masumoto
222	Honda Cars Tokai	Honda Fit3 RS (GK5)		(Japan) Toshiki Takeuchi (Japan) Masanori Tanaka (Japan) Hajime Saimen (Japan) Daisuke Yamawaki (Rd. 1-5) (Japan) Masaki Nishihata (Rd. 3)

== Race results ==
Round	Circuit	Race	ST-X Winners	ST-Z Winners	ST-TCR Winners	ST-Q Winners	ST-1 Winners	ST-2 Winners	ST-3 Winners	ST-4 Winners	ST-5 Winners
1	Motegi	(Note: Race was declared official after 3 hours, 18 minutes due to heavy rain.)	No.777 D'station Racing	No.22 Porsche Team EBI Waimarama	No.75 Team Noah	No.28 ROOKIE Racing	No.2 KTM Cars Japan	No.225 Kobe Toyopet Motorsports	No.244 Max Racing	No.884 Hayashi Telempu SHADE Racing	No.66 Over Drive
1	Motegi	(Note: Race was declared official after 3 hours, 18 minutes due to heavy rain.)	(Japan) Satoshi Hoshino (Japan) Tomonobu Fujii (Japan) Tsubasa Kondo	(Japan) Kizuna (Japan) Katsumasa Chiyo (Japan) Naoya Yamano (Japan) Riki Okusa	(Japan) Kuniyuki Haga (Japan) Yoshikazu Sobu (Japan) Shigetomo Shimono (Japan) Riki Tanioka	(Japan) Naoya Gamou (Japan) Daisuke Toyoda (Japan) Kenta Yamashita (Japan) Yasuhiro Ogura	(Japan) Taiyo Iida (Japan) Kazuho Takahashi (Japan) Hiroki Katoh	(Japan) Seita Nonaka (Japan) Hibiki Taira (Japan) Miki Onaga	(Japan) Toru Tanaka (Japan) Tetsuya Tanaka (Japan) Atsushi Miyake	(Japan) Yuji Kunimoto (Japan) Keishi Ishikawa	(Japan) Takayuki Takechi (Japan) Tatsuya Ota (Japan) Takahisa Ohno (Japan) Kyosuke Inomata
2	Sugo	Group 1	No.16 Porsche Center Okazaki	No.23 TKRI	No.75 Team Noah	No.28 ROOKIE Racing	No.38 Tracy Sports	did not participate			
2	Sugo	Group 1	(Japan) Hiroaki Nagai (Japan) Yuta Kamimura (Japan) Yuichi Nakayama	(Japan) Daisuke (Japan) Yuya Motojima	(Japan) Toshiro Tsukada (Japan) Yoshikazu Sobu (Japan) Shigetomo Shimono (Japan) Yuji Kiyotaki	(Japan) Naoya Gamou (Japan) Daisuke Toyoda (Japan) Kenta Yamashita (Japan) Yasuhiro Ogura	(Japan) Yuui Tsutsumi (Japan) Ryohei Sakaguchi (Japan) Makoto Hotta	did not participate			
2	Sugo	Group 2	did not participate					No.225 Kobe Toyopet Motorsports	No.52 Saitama Toyopet GreenBrave	No.884 Hayashi Telempu SHADE Racing	No.456 Over Drive
2	Sugo	Group 2	did not participate					(Japan) Seita Nonaka (Japan) Hibiki Taira (Japan) Miki Onaga	(Japan) Naoki Hattori (Japan) Hiroki Yoshida (Japan) Kohta Kawaai (Japan) Takayuki Hiranuma	(Japan) Yuji Kunimoto (Japan) Keishi Ishikawa (Japan) Eijiro Shimizu	(Japan) Riku Hashimoto (Japan) Kousei Kanto (Japan) Tatsuya Osaki
3	Fuji	(Note: Fuji 24 Hours qualifying was cancelled due to weather. No qualifying points were awarded.)	No.81 GTNET Motor Sports	No.3 Endless Sports	No.97 Racer M&K Racing	No.28 ROOKIE Racing	No.2 KTM Cars Japan	No.7 Shinryo Racing Team	No.62 HELM Motorsports	No.18 Asano Racing Service	No.456 Over Drive
3	Fuji	(Note: Fuji 24 Hours qualifying was cancelled due to weather. No qualifying points were awarded.)	(Japan) Noboyuki Oyagi (Japan) Takayuki Aoki (Japan) Kiyoto Fujinami (Japan) Natsu Sakaguchi	(Japan) Yudai Uchida (Japan) Hideki Yamauchi (Japan) Togo Suganami (Japan) Ryo Ogawa	(Japan) Mitsuhiro Endo (Japan) Shinji Nakano (Japan) Syun Koide (Japan) Ryunosuke Sawa (Japan) Kenta Harada	(Japan) Naoya Gamou (Japan) Daisuke Toyoda (Japan) Kenta Yamashita (Japan) Yasuhiro Ogura (Japan) Kazuya Oshima (Japan) Shunsuke Kohno	(Japan) Taiyo Iida (Japan) Hiroki Katoh (Japan) Takashi Kobayashi (Japan) Hiroki Yoshimoto (Japan) Kazuho Takahashi	(Japan) Yoshiki Fujii (Japan) Masato Narisawa (Japan) Keisuke Anzai (Japan) Shingo Imai (Japan) Akiyoshi Shibuya (Japan) Hirofumi Okumura	(Japan) Yuya Hiraki (Japan) Reiji Hiraki (Japan) Tomoki Takahashi (Japan) Ryosuke Matsuzawa	(Japan) Takeo Asano (Japan) Daiki Fujiwara (Japan) Toshikazu Shiba (Japan) Kota Matsui (Japan) Ryo Fukatsu (Japan) Yuya Nakajima	(Japan) Riku Hashimoto (Japan) Kousei Kanto (Japan) Tatsuya Osaki (Japan) Koji Obara (Japan) Takafumi Katsuki (Japan) Ryosuke Kagami
4	Autopolis		No.290 Floral Racing with ABSSA	No.47 D'station Racing	No.97 Racer M&K Racing	No.28 ROOKIE Racing	No.2 KTM Cars Japan	No.225 Kobe Toyopet Motorsports	No.39 Tracy Sports with Delta	No.310 C.S.I Racing	No.50 Love Drive Racing
4	Autopolis		(Japan) Teruhiko Hamano (Japan) Keita Sawa (Japan) Shintaro Kawabata	(Japan) Tatsuya Hoshino (Japan) Manabu Orido (Japan) Takuro Shinohara (Japan) Kenji Hama	(Japan) Mitsuhiro Endo (Japan) Shinji Nakano (Japan) Syun Koide (Japan) Kenta Harada	(Japan) Naoya Gamou (Japan) Daisuke Toyoda (Japan) Kenta Yamashita (Japan) Yasuhiro Ogura	(Japan) Taiyo Iida (Japan) Kazuho Takahashi (Japan) Hiroki Katoh (Japan) Hiroki Yoshimoto	(Japan) Seita Nonaka (Japan) Hibiki Taira (Japan) Miki Onaga (Japan) Kengo Ichijo	(Japan) Yusuke Tomibayashi (Japan) Kazuya Oshima (Japan) Hirotaka Ishii	(Japan) Sho Tsuboi (Japan) Shinya Hosokawa (Japan) Fuma Horio	(Japan) Koji Yamanishi (Japan) Yoshihito Shinoda (Japan) Hiroyuki Matsumura
5	Suzuka		No.777 D'station Racing	No.47 D'station Racing	No.97 Racer M&K Racing	No.28 ROOKIE Racing	No.2 KTM Cars Japan	No.59 TOWAINTEC Racing	No.39 Tracy Sports with Delta	No.310 C.S.I Racing	No.66 Over Drive
5	Suzuka		(Japan) Satoshi Hoshino (Japan) Tomonobu Fujii (Japan) Tsubasa Kondo	(Japan) Tatsuya Hoshino (Japan) Manabu Orido (Japan) Takuro Shinohara (Japan) Kenji Hama	(Japan) Mitsuhiro Endo (Japan) Shinji Nakano (Japan) Syun Koide	(Japan) Naoya Gamou (Japan) Daisuke Toyoda (Japan) Kenta Yamashita (Japan) Yasuhiro Ogura	(Japan) Taiyo Iida (Japan) Hiroki Katoh (Japan) Hiroki Yoshimoto (Japan) Kazuho Takahashi	(Japan) Manabu Osawa (Japan) Hitoshi Gotoh (Japan) Mizuki Ishizaka	(Japan) Yusuke Tomibayashi (Japan) Kazuya Oshima (Japan) Hirotaka Ishii	(Japan) Sho Tsuboi (Japan) Shinya Hosokawa (Japan) Fuma Horio	(Japan) Takayuki Takechi (Japan) Tatsuya Ota (Japan) Takahisa Ohno (Japan) Kyosuke Inomata
6	Okayama	Group 1	No.16 Porsche Center Okazaki	No.311 C.S.I Racing	No.75 Team Noah	No.28 ROOKIE Racing	No.38 Tracy Sports	No.225 Kobe Toyopet Motorsports	did not participate		
6	Okayama	Group 1	(Japan) Hiroaki Nagai (Japan) Yuta Kamimura (Japan) Yuichi Nakayama	(Japan) Hirokazu Suzuki (Japan) Rintaro Kubo (Japan) Yusuke Shiotsu (Japan) Kimiya Sato	(Japan) Toshiro Tsukada (Japan) Yoshikazu Sobu (Japan) Shigetomo Shimono (Japan) Yuji Kiyotaki	(Japan) Naoya Gamou (Japan) Daisuke Toyoda (Japan) Kenta Yamashita (Japan) Yasuhiro Ogura	(Japan) Yuui Tsutsumi (Japan) Ryohei Sakaguchi (Japan) Makoto Hotta	(Japan) Seita Nonaka (Japan) Hibiki Taira (Japan) Miki Onaga	did not participate		
6	Okayama	Group 2	did not participate			No.37 Mazda Spirit Racing	did not participate		No.52 Saitama Toyopet GreenBrave	No.884 Hayashi Telempu SHADE Racing	No.456 Over Drive
6	Okayama	Group 2	did not participate			(Japan) Kaoru Ijiri (Japan) Ikuo Maeda (Japan) Kazuhiro Terakawa (Japan) Yutaka Seki	did not participate		(Japan) Naoki Hattori (Japan) Hiroki Yoshida (Japan) Kohta Kawaai	(Japan) Yuji Kunimoto (Japan) Keishi Ishikawa (Japan) Eijiro Shimizu	(Japan) Riku Hashimoto (Japan) Kousei Kanto (Japan) Tatsuya Osaki

== Championship standings ==
Championship points were awarded in every class with the exception of ST-Q at the end of each event. Each team's five highest-scoring rounds counted towards the final championship standings.

Points systems
Duration	1st	2nd	3rd	4th	5th	6th	7th	8th	9th	10th	≤11th	Pole
3 Hours / 500km	20	15	12	10	8	6	4	3	2	1	0	2
5 Hours / 700km	30	22.5	18	15	12	9	6	4.5	3	1.5	1	2
≥12 Hours / 1400km	45	35	27	23	18	13	9	7	5	3	1	2

=== Teams' Championship standings ===
Pos.	Car	Team	TRM	SUG	FSW	AUT	SUZ	OIC	Points
ST-X
1	777	D'station Racing	1	2	2	2	1		132.5
2	290	Floral Racing with ABSSA	2	3	3	1	**4**	4	108.5
3	16	Porsche Center Okazaki	**3**	1		**5**	2	**1**	98.5
4	81	GTNET Motor Sports	5	4	1	DSQ	NC	2	82
5	31	apr	6	**5**	Ret	4	3	3	64
6	9	MP Racing	4	Ret	NC	3		5	41
7	999	CarGuy Racing			4				23
8	33	Audi Team Hitotsuyama			5				18
ST-Z
1	3	Endless Sports	10	2	1	3	3	4	106
2	47	D'station Racing	6	3	9	1	1	2	98
3	500	Team 5Zigen	2	4	3	4	7	11	80.5
4	20	SS/YZ Racing with Studie	8	6	2	2	8	6	74
5	311	C.S.I Racing	4	**5**		**Ret**	**2**	**1**	73.5
6	108	Close Up Racing		11	5	6	4	3	54
7	22	Porsche Team EBI Waimarama	1	9	6	8	9	9	52.5
8	885	Hayashi Telempu SHADE Racing	12	8	4	7	6	12	42
9	23	TKRI	7	1		9	5	13	41
10	111	Hiroshima Toyopet Racing	3	12		5	11	7	35
11	505	Audi Team AS Sport	9	Ret	8		10	5	19.5
12	34	Techno First	5	10				8	16
13	30	B-Max Engineering	14	7	7				14
14	170	Birth Racing Project						10	1
15	70	Comet Racing	11	Ret					1
16	77	Comet Racing	13						1
ST-TCR
1	75	Team Noah	**1**	**1**	2	2	**2**	1	136
2	97	Racer M&K Racing			1	**1**	1		107
3	33	Audi Driving Experience Japan						**2**	17
ST-1
1	2	KTM Cars Japan	**1**	Ret	1	**1**	**1**	2	156
2	38	Tracy Sports	2	**1**	2	2	3	**1**	124
3	71	Akiland Racing	3	2		3	2	3	85.5
4	8	BMW Team Studie			3				27
ST-2
1	7	Shinryo Racing Team	2	3	1	3	2	4	120
2	59	TOWAINTEC Racing	4	5	3	2	1	5	102.5
3	225	Kobe Toyopet Motor Sports	1	1	Ret	1	Ret	1	100
4	6	Shinryo Racing Team	5	2	4	**4**	**3**	**3**	89
5	24	GranValley Racing			2				35
6	743	Honda R&D Challenge	3	6	NC			Ret	24
7	56	Claris Racing		Ret	5	Ret	NC	6	24
8	32	ROOKIE Racing	**6**	**4**					23
9	13	Endless Sports						2	15
ST-3
1	39	Tracy Sports with Delta	2	2	5	**1**	**1**	**3**	119.5
2	244	Max Racing	1	4	4	3	3	2	104
3	62	HELM Motorsports	5	**3**	1	Ret	2	5	101.5
4	52	Saitama Toyopet GreenBrave	**3**	1	6	2	5	1	95.5
5	15	Okabe Jidosha Motorsport	4	5	3	5	4	4	79
6	41	Tracy Sports with Delta	6	6	2	4	6	6	74
7	35	Techno First						7	4
ST-4
1	884	Hayashi Telempu SHADE Racing	1	1	2	2	2	1	130
2	310	C.S.I Racing	**2**	**3**	3	**1**	**1**	**Ret**	129.5
3	18	Asano Racing Service	3	2	1	3		2	111
ST-5
1	66	Over Drive	1	3	2	3	1	2	128
2	456	Over Drive	**5**	1	1	**11**	**2**	1	123.5
3	72	Nihon Automobile College	8	**2**	7	4	4	**3**	70
4	88	Murakami Motors	3	5	3	6		5	70
5	17	Team NOPRO	6	9	4	2	6	7	67.5
6	4	Team Bride	7	4	5	5	5	4	62
7	50	Love Drive Racing	11	Ret	10	1	3	Ret	52
8	37	Team NOPRO	4	7	6	7	7		44
9	103	HMRacers	2	6	8	Ret	10	6	43
10	222	Honda Cars Tokai	9	11	11	10	8	10	11
11	78	Love Drive Racing	10	12	Ret	9	9	8	10.5
12	67	Team Yamato		8	9			9	10
13	120	Murakami Motors		10		8		NC	5.5
14	110	Hiroshima Toyopet Racing						Ret	0
Pos.	Car	Team	TRM	SUG	FSW	AUT	SUZ	OIC	Points

Colour	Result
Gold	Winner
Silver	Second place
Bronze	Third place
Green	Points classification
Blue	Non-points classification
Blue	Non-classified finish (NC)
Purple	Retired, not classified (Ret)
Red	Did not qualify (DNQ)
Red	Did not pre-qualify (DNPQ)
Black	Disqualified (DSQ)
White	Did not start (DNS)
White	Withdrew (WD)
White	Race cancelled (C)
Blank	Did not practice (DNP)
Blank	Did not arrive (DNA)
Blank	Excluded (EX)

**Bold** - Pole position

Italics - Fastest lap
