= Takuro Shinohara =

Japanese racing driver from Yokohama (born 1994)

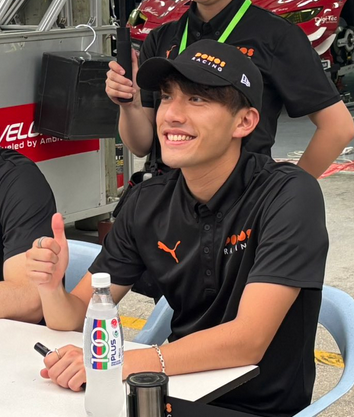
- Shinohara at the 2025 Super GT Malaysia Festival
- Nationality: Japan
- Born: November 20, 1994 (age 31) Yokohama, Kanagawa, Japan

Super GT GT300 career
- Debut season: 2018
- Current team: Ponos Racing
- Categorisation: FIA Silver
- Car number: 45
- Former teams: LEON Racing, Hitotsuyama Racing, X Works, Pacific – D'station Racing
- Starts: 36
- Wins: 3
- Podiums: 9
- Poles: 4
- Fastest laps: 3
- Best finish: 2nd in 2024

Previous series
- 2020 2019-21 2015-17 2013-14: Formula Regional Japanese Championship; TCR Japan Touring Car Series; F4 Japanese Championship; Super FJ

Championship titles
- 2020 2020 2014: TCR Japan Sunday Series; TCR Japan Saturday Series; Super FJ

Takuro Shinohara (篠原 拓朗, Shinohara Takurō) (born November 20, 1994) is a Japanese racing driver from Yokohama. He won the TCR Japan Saturday and Sunday Series in 2020, racing for Audi Team Hitotsuyama.

== Career ==
=== Super GT ===
In 2018, Shinohara was listed in the Fuji Race for Audi Team Hitotsuyama but did not race. Shinohara made his debut in the series in 2020 with X Works partnered with Hong Kong driver Shaun Thong. Shinohara only raced for the first round, then he competed with Pacific – D'station Racing AMR for two rounds. Shinohara competed full time for 2021 with Audi Team Hitotsuyama alongside Shintaro Kawabata. He went on to get his first Super GT win at Motegi, and finished 15th in the standings.

Shinohara then moved to K2 R&D LEON Racing, replacing Togo Suganami. He stayed with Naoya Gamou for 2023, and they claimed fourth place in the standings. Shinohara achieved his highest finished in his GT300 career where he finished second behind the eventual champion JLOC's No. 88 with Takashi Kogure and Yuya Motojima.

Shinohara left LEON Racing as he moved to Ponos Racing.

=== GT World Challenge ===
Shinohara would make his GT World Challenge race with Porsche Racing Okazaki in 2025 Intercontinental GT Challenge Suzuka 1000 km with Kazuto Kotaka and Hiroaki Nagai.

== Racing record ==
=== Career summary ===
Season	Series	Team	Races	Wins	Poles	FLaps	Podiums	Points	Position
2015	F4 Japanese Championship	VSR Lamborghini S.C.Formula Jr	14	0	0	0	0	35	11th
2016	F4 Japanese Championship	Media Do Kageyama Racing	13	0	0	1	3	80	8th
2017	F4 Japanese Championship	Media Do Kageyama Racing	14	0	0	0	1	72	9th
2018	Super GT - GT300	Audi Sport Team Hitotsuyama	1	0	0	0	0	0	NC
2019	TCR Japan - Saturday Series	Audi Sport Team Hitotsuyama	4	1	3	2	3	82	**2nd**
2019	TCR Japan - Sunday Series	Audi Sport Team Hitotsuyama	4	1	3	2	1	46	7th
2019	F4 Japanese Championship	Media Do Kageyama Racing	4	0	0	0	0	8	16th
2020	TCR Japan - Saturday Series	Audi Sport Team Hitotsuyama	5	4	0	0	4	119	**1st**
2020	TCR Japan - Sunday Series	Audi Sport Team Hitotsuyama	5	3	0	0	4	120	**1st**
2020	Super Taikyu - ST-Z	D'station Racing	5	1	2	1	4	108.5‡	**2nd‡**
2020	Formula Regional Japanese Championship	Sutekina Racing Team	3	0	0	0	2	43	9th
2020	Super GT - GT300	X Works	1	0	0	0	0	6	24th
2020	Super GT - GT300	Pacific – D'station Racing AMR	2	0	0	0	0	6	24th
2021	Super GT - GT300	Audi Sport Team Hitotsuyama	8	1	0	0	1	20	15th
2021	TCR Japan - Sunday Series	Audi Sport Team Hitotsuyama	2	0	0	1	2	41	5th
2021	TCR Japan - Saturday Series	Audi Sport Team Hitotsuyama	1	0	0	0	0	16	15th
2021	Super Taikyu - ST-Z	D'station Racing	6	2	0	1	4	98‡	**2nd‡**
2022	Super GT - GT300	K2 R&D LEON Racing	8	0	1	1	2	33	9th
2022	Super Taikyu - ST-X	MP Racing	3	0	0	0	0	35‡	8th‡
2023	Super GT - GT300	K2 R&D LEON Racing	8	0	1	1	2	44	4th
2023	Super Taikyu - ST-Z	Team ZeroOne	5	0	0	0	2	77.5‡	4th‡
2024	Super GT - GT300	K2 R&D LEON Racing	8	2	2	1	4	92	**2nd**
2024	Super Taikyu - ST-Z	Team ZeroOne	7	0	4	0	3	75‡	6th‡
2025	Super GT - GT300	PONOS Racing	8	0	0	0	0	34	17th
2025	Super Taikyu - ST-Z	Team ZeroOne							
2025	Intercontinental GT Challenge	Porsche Centre Okazaki	1	0	0	0	0	0	NC
2025	TGR GR86/BRZ Cup	Team Takuty	1	0	0	0	0	4	20th
2026	Super Taikyu - ST-Z	Team ZeroOne							
2026	Super GT - GT300	Ponos Racing	8	0	1	1	0	49	11th
2026	GT World Challenge Asia	Harmony Racing	2	1	1	0	1	37	19th
2026–27	Asian Le Mans Series – GT3	Ponos Racing						*	*

‡ Team standings

=== Complete F4 Japanese Championship results ===
(key) (Races in bold indicate pole position) (Races in italics indicate fastest lap)

Year	Team	1	2	3	4	5	6	7	8	9	10	11	12	13	14	DC	Pts
2015	VSR Lamborghini S.C.Formula Jr	OKA; 1; 17	OKA; 2; 18	FUJ1; 1 Ret	FUJ1; 2; 4	FUJ2; 1; 18	FUJ2; 2; 8	SUZ; 1; 18	SUZ; 2; 8	SUG; 1; 9	SUG; 2; 4	AUT; 1; 7	AUT; 2; 9	MOT; 1; 10	MOT; 2; 22	11th	35
2016	Media Do Kageyama Racing	OKA; 1; 12	OKA; 2; 9	FUJ1; 1; 4	FUJ1; 2; 15	SUG; 1; 10	SUG; 2; 12	FUJ2; 1; 7	FUJ2; 2; 3	**FUJ2**; **3**; **2**	SUZ; 1; 15	SUZ; 2; 12	MOT; 1 Ret	MOT; 2; 6	**MOT**; **3**; **2**	8th	80
2017	Media Do Kageyama Racing	OKA; 1; 8	OKA; 2 Ret	FUJ1; 1; 5	FUJ1; 2; 12	AUT; 1; 6	AUT; 2; 14	SUG; 1; 6	SUG; 2 Ret	FUJ2; 1; 8	FUJ2; 2; 6	SUZ; 1; 9	SUZ; 2; 9	MOT; 1; 2	MOT; 2; 6	9th	72
2019	Media Do Kageyama Racing	OKA; 1	OKA; 2	FUJ1; 1; 6	FUJ1; 2; 17	SUZ; 1; 12	SUZ; 2; 12	FUJ2; 1	FUJ2; 2	AUT; 1	AUT; 2	SUG; 1	SUG; 2	MOT; 1	MOT; 2	16th	8

=== Complete Super GT results ===
Year	Team	Car	Class	1	2	3	4	5	6	7	8	9	DC	Pts
2018	Audi Sport Team Hitotsuyama	Audi R8 LMS Evo	GT300	OKA	FUJ; DNR	SUZ	CHA	FUJ	SUG	AUT	MOT		NC	0
2020	X Works	Audi R8 LMS Evo	GT300	FUJ; 18	FUJ	SUZ	MOT						24th	6
2020	Pacific – D'station Racing AMR	Aston Martin Vantage AMR GT3	GT300					FUJ; 24	SUZ	MOT	FUJ; 5		24th	6
2021	Audi Sport Team Hitotsuyama	Audi R8 LMS Evo	GT300	OKA; 13	FUJ; 17	MOT; 16	SUZ; 21	SUG; 25	AUT; 15	MOT; 1	FUJ; 17		15th	20
2022	K2 R&D LEON Racing	Mercedes-AMG GT3 Evo	GT300	OKA; 3	FUJ; 15	SUZ; 13	**FUJ**; Ret	SUZ; 6	SUG; 6	AUT; 3	MOT; 18		9th	33
2023	K2 R&D LEON Racing	Mercedes-AMG GT3 Evo	GT300	**OKA**; 2	FUJ; 4	SUZ; 12	FUJ; 25	SUZ; Ret	SUG; 6	AUT; 12	MOT; 2		4th	44
2024	K2 R&D LEON Racing	Mercedes-AMG GT3 Evo	GT300	**OKA**; **2^{1}**	FUJ; 26	SUZ; 8	**FUJ**; **1^{1}**	SUG; 1	AUT; 6	MOT; 2	SUZ; 4		2nd	92
2025	PONOS Racing	Ferrari 296 GT3	GT300	OKA; 12	FUJ; 6	SEP; 14	FS1; 13	FS2 (9)	SUZ; 4	SUG; 21	AUT; 16	MOT; 21	17th	34
2026	PONOS Racing	Ferrari 296 GT3 Evo	GT300	OKA; 20	FUJ; Ret	**FUJ**; 4	SUZ; 15	SUG; 11	AUT; 6	MOT; 4	MOT; 10		11th	49

=== Complete Formula Regional Japanese Championship results ===
(key) (Races in bold indicate pole position) (Races in italics indicate fastest lap)

Year	Entrant	1	2	3	4	5	6	7	8	9	10	11	12	13	14	Pos	Points
2020	Sutekina Racing Team	FUJ1; 1; 3	FUJ1; 2; 2	FUJ1; 3; 5	SUG; 1	SUG; 2	SUG; 3	FUJ2; 1	FUJ2; 2	MOT; 1	MOT; 2	OKA; 1	OKA; 2	AUT; 1	AUT; 2	9th	43
