= 2020 Super Taikyu Series =

Car endurance racing season

The 2020 Pirelli Super Taikyu Series was the twenty-ninth season of the Super Taikyu Series endurance racing championship. It began with the Fuji Super TEC 24 Hours at Fuji Speedway, which was postponed to 5-6 September due to the effects of the COVID-19 pandemic. It ended on 13 December at Autopolis, after five out of six scheduled rounds.

Mercedes-AMG Team Hirix Racing won the championship in the series' GT3 category, known as ST-X, with a Mercedes-AMG GT3 Evo. It was the team's first and only season in Super Taikyu.

This was the third and final year of Pirelli's contract as the series' official tyre supplier, to be replaced by Hankook beginning in 2021.

== Calendar ==
The Super Taikyu Series announced its initial six-race calendar on 27 November 2019. There were no significant changes from the 2019 schedule, which again featured one round at each of Japan's six major racing circuits.

Mobilityland Corporation, the owner of Suzuka Circuit, announced on 2 March that the opening round, originally scheduled for 21-22 March, had been postponed due to the outbreak of the novel coronavirus. A new calendar was published on 10 June, confirming that the start of the season would be delayed to September. Only the round at Okayama International Circuit, originally intended to host the season finale, would retain its initial date of 31 October-1 November.

Round	Event	Race Length	Race Format	Circuit	Date
1	NAPAC Fuji SUPER TEC 24 Hours Race	24 hours	1 race	Fuji Speedway	4–6 September 2020
2	Sugo Super Taikyu 3 Hour Race	3 hours	2 races	Sportsland Sugo	10–11 October 2020
3	Super Taikyu Race in Okayama	3 hours	2 races	Okayama International Circuit	31 October–1 November 2020
4	Motegi Super Taikyu 5 Hours Race	5 hours	1 race	Twin Ring Motegi	21–22 November 2020
5	TKU Super Taikyu Race in Autopolis	5 hours	1 race	Autopolis	12–13 December 2020
	Suzuka S-Tai (Cancelled)	5 hours	1 race	Suzuka Circuit	23–24 January 2021

The Suzuka round, which had been rescheduled to take place on 24 January 2021, was eventually cancelled on 13 January due to multiple prefectures in the Chūbu region declaring a state of emergency. The Super Taikyu Series officially announced the conclusion of the 2020 season two weeks later on 26 January.

== Teams and drivers ==
58 cars entered throughout the course of the 2020 season. All entries were registered under a Japanese license.

No	Entrant	Vehicle	Drivers
ST–X (FIA GT3 homologated vehicles)
9	MP Racing	Nissan GT-R NISMO GT3 (MY18)	(Japan) Joe Shindo (Japan) Yusaku Shibata (Japan) Masami Kageyama (Japan) Keiichi Inoue (Rd. 1-4) (Japan) Tsugio Matsuda (Rd. 1) (Japan) Yuki Tanaka (Rd. 1) (Japan) Ryuichiro Tomita (Rd. 5)
16	Porsche Center Okazaki (Rd. 2-3)	Porsche 911 GT3 R (991)	(Japan) Hiroaki Nagai (Japan) Yuta Kamimura
31	apr	Lexus RC F GT3	(Japan) Hideki Nagai (Japan) Koki Saga (Japan) Kazuto Kotaka (Japan) Yuta Kamimura (Rd. 1, 4) (Japan) Hiroaki Nagai (Rd. 1, 5) (Japan) Yuichi Nakayama (Rd. 1)
81	GTNET Motor Sports (Rd. 1, 3-5)	Nissan GT-R NISMO GT3 (MY18)	(Japan) Nobuyuki Oyagi (Japan) Kiyoto Fujinami (Japan) Kazuki Hoshino (Japan) Ryuichiro Oyagi (Japan) Natsu Sakaguchi (Rd. 1) (Japan) Kazuki Hiramine (Rd. 1)
777	D'station Racing	Aston Martin Vantage AMR GT3	(Japan) Satoshi Hoshino (Japan) Tomonobu Fujii (Japan) Tsubasa Kondo (Japan) Yuya Motojima (Rd. 1)
888	Mercedes-AMG Team HIRIX Racing	Mercedes-AMG GT3 Evo	(Japan) Daisuke Yamawaki (Hong Kong) Shaun Thong (Japan) Shinichi Takagi (Rd. 1-3) (Japan) Yuki Nemoto (Rd. 1, 4-5)
ST–Z (FIA GT4 homologated vehicles)
2	KTM Cars Japan	KTM X-Bow GT4	(Japan) Taiyo Iida (Japan) Hiroki Katoh (Japan) Kazuho Takahashi (Japan) Masataka Yanagida (Rd. 1) (Japan) Takashi Kobayashi (Rd. 1)
3	Endless Sports	Mercedes-AMG GT4	(Japan) Yudai Uchida (Japan) Hideki Yamauchi (Japan) Tsubasa Takahashi (Japan) Shinnosuke Yamada (Rd. 1) (Japan) Ryuichiro Tomita (Rd. 1) (Japan) Togo Suganami (Rd. 4-5)
19	Birth Racing Project	Porsche Cayman GT4 Clubsport MR	(Japan) Kohei Fukuda (Japan) Takeshi Matsumoto (Japan) Yusuke Shiotsu (Japan) Koichi Okumura (Japan) Shigetomo Shimono (Rd. 1) (Japan) Kengo Ichijo (Rd. 1)
20	SS/YZ Racing with Studie (Note: Car No. 20 entered as SS/YZ Racing with Studie, car No. 21 entered as Team São Tome and Principe with Studie.); Team São Tomé and Principe with Studie (Rd. 2-5) (Note: Car No. 20 entered as SS/YZ Racing with Studie, car No. 21 entered as Team São Tome and Principe with Studie.)	BMW M4 GT4 (F82)	(Japan) Hirokazu Suzuki (Japan) Takayuki Kinoshita (Japan) Jukuchou Sunako (Japan) Seiji Ara (Rd. 1, 5) (Brazil) João Paulo de Oliveira (Rd. 1)
21	SS/YZ Racing with Studie; Team São Tomé and Principe with Studie (Rd. 2-5)	BMW M4 GT4 (F82)	(Japan) Takashi Kochiya (Japan) Takumi Sanada (Japan) Yuji Takahashi
23	TKRI (Rd. 2-5)	Mercedes-AMG GT4	(Japan) Daisuke (Japan) Yuya Motojima (Japan) Takaaki Hamada (Rd. 2, 4-5) (Japan) Tetsuya Moriyama (Rd. 3-5)
47	D'station Racing	Aston Martin Vantage GT4	(Japan) Tatsuya Hoshino (Japan) Manabu Orido (Japan) Takuro Shinohara (Japan) Kenji Hama (Rd. 1-3, 5) (Japan) Tsubasa Mekaru (Rd. 1)
51	BEND (Rd. 4)	Porsche Cayman GT4 Clubsport	(Japan) Masamitsu Ishihara (Japan) Atsushi Yogo (Japan) Daisuke Ikeda
500	Team 5Zigen	Mercedes-AMG GT4	(Japan) Ryuichiro Otsuka (Japan) Takayuki Aoki (Japan) Kazuya Shimogaki (Rd. 1-3) (Japan) Toshihiko Hachiro (Rd. 1) (Japan) Toshihiro Kaneishi (Rd. 1) (Japan) Shuma Hiroshima (Rd. 1) (Japan) Yuya Sakamoto (Rd. 2-5) (Japan) Takuya Otaki (Rd. 5)
505	Audi Team AS Sport (Rd. 1-2, 4)	Audi R8 LMS GT4	(Japan) Genki Nishimura (Japan) Shozo Tagahara (Japan) Takeshi Okamoto (Rd. 1-2) (Japan) Yoshinari Fujiwara (Rd. 1)
ST–TCR (TCR homologated vehicles)
22	Waimarama Kizuna Racing Team	Audi RS 3 LMS TCR	(Japan) Kizuna (Japan) Katsumasa Chiyo (Japan) Hironobu Yasuda (Japan) Riki Okusa (Japan) Naoya Yamano (Rd. 1) (Japan) Toshihiro Yoshida (Rd. 1)
33	Audi Driving Experience Japan (Rd. 4)	Audi RS 3 LMS TCR	(Japan) Hideki Nakahara (Japan) Ryuichiro Tomita (Japan) Masataka Yanagida (Japan) Yuki Fujii
65	Audi Team Mars	Audi RS 3 LMS TCR	(Japan) Masanobu Kato (Japan) Masato Shimoyama (Japan) Toshiro Tsukada (Rd. 1-2, 5) (Japan) Sakon Yamamoto (Rd. 1) (Japan) Daisuke Hasegawa (Rd. 1) (Japan) Hideaki Okajima (Rd. 1) (Japan) Taketoshi Matsui (Rd. 2-5) (Japan) Yosuke Yamazaki (Rd. 3-4)
97	Racer Dome Racing (Rd. 1, 4-5)	Honda Civic Type R TCR (FK7)	(Japan) Mitsuhiro Endo (Japan) Shinji Nakano (Japan) Syun Koide (Japan) Hiroki Otsu (Rd. 1, 4) (Japan) Kenta Harada (Rd. 1) (Japan) Ryusuke Matsumoto (Rd. 1)
290	Floral Racing with Uematsu	Honda Civic Type R TCR (FK7)	(Japan) Tadao Uematsu (Japan) Yuji Ide (Japan) Shintaro Kawabata (Japan) Tomoki Nojiri (Rd. 1)
ST–1
12	Field Management Racing (Rd. 1)	Porsche Cayman GT4 Clubsport MR	(Finland) Mika Salo (Japan) Kosuke Matsuura (Finland) Max Salo (Japan) Yuya Hiraki (Japan) Katsuhisa Kumabayashi (Japan) Masatoshi Uesugi
28	ROOKIE Racing (Rd. 1-3, 5)	Toyota GR Supra GT4 (3BA-DB42) Prototype	(Japan) Naoya Gamou (Japan) Daisuke Toyoda (Japan) Yasuhiro Ogura (Japan) Shunsuke Kohno (Japan) Hisashi Yabuki (Rd. 1) (Japan) Kazuya Oshima (Rd. 1)
38	Tracy Sports (Rd. 1, 3)	Lexus RC F (USC10)	(Japan) Makoto Hotta (Japan) Ryohei Sakaguchi (Japan) Yuui Tsutsumi (Japan) Sena Sakaguchi
ST–2 (2,001-3,500cc, front and all-wheel drive)
6	Shinryo Racing Team	Mitsubishi Lancer Evolution X (CZ4A)	(Japan) Tomohiro Tomimasu (Japan) Yasushi Kikuchi (Japan) Masazumi Ohashi (Japan) Takahiro Matsuzawa (Rd. 1) (Japan) Takahisa Ohno (Rd. 1) (Japan) Zene Okazaki (Rd. 1)
7	Shinryo Racing Team	Mitsubishi Lancer Evolution X (CZ4A)	(Japan) Masato Narisawa (Japan) Keisuke Anzai (Japan) Yoshiki Fujii (Japan) Wataru Yamaki (Rd. 1) (Japan) Shingo Imai (Rd. 1) (Japan) Hirofumi Okumura (Rd. 1)
17	Team NOPRO (Rd. 1-4)	Mazda Axela Diesel Turbo (BM2FS)	(Japan) Tatsuya Nogami (Japan) Tobio Ohtani (Japan) Toshihiko Nogami (Japan) Hiroaki Yamamoto (Rd. 1, 4) (Japan) Keita Sawa (Rd. 1) (Japan) Hideyoshi Nishizawa (Rd. 1)
32	ROOKIE Racing	Toyota GR Yaris (GXPA16) Prototype	(Japan) Takuto Iguchi (Japan) Masahiro Sasaki (Japan) Morizo (Japan) Norihiko Katsuta (Rd. 1) (Japan) Hiroaki Ishiura (Rd. 1)
59	TOWAINTEC Racing	Subaru WRX STI (VAB)	(Japan) Manabu Osawa (Japan) Hitoshi Gotoh (Japan) Mizuki Ishizaka (Japan) Yoshiyuki Tsuruga (Rd. 1)
743	Honda R&D Challenge (Rd. 4)	Honda Civic Type R (FK8)	(Japan) Junichi Kidachi (Japan) Hideki Kakinuma (Japan) Tetsuaki Mochizuki (Japan) Hitoshi Sezai
ST–3 (2,001-3,500cc, rear-wheel drive)
15	Okabe Jidosha Motorsport	Nissan Fairlady Z (Z34)	(Japan) Masaaki Nagashima (Japan) Kazuomi Komatsu (Japan) Jun Tashiro (Japan) Manabu Yamazaki (Rd. 1-4) (Japan) Yuga Katsumata (Rd. 1) (Japan) Masaya Kohno (Rd. 1)
39	Tracy Sports	Lexus RC 350 (GSC10)	(Japan) Kazuya Oshima (Japan) Yusuke Tomibayashi (Japan) Hirotaka Ishii (Japan) Sesshu Kondo (Rd. 1) (Japan) Hirohito Ito (Rd. 1) (Japan) Yoshihiro Ito (Rd. 4)
52	Saitama Toyopet GreenBrave	Toyota Crown RS (ARS220)	(Japan) Naoki Hattori (Japan) Hiroki Yoshida (Japan) Kohta Kawaai (Japan) Takayuki Hiranuma (Rd. 1, 4-5)
62	HELM Motorsports (Rd. 2, 4)	Lexus RC 350 (GSC10)	(Japan) Yuya Hiraki (Japan) Reiji Hiraki (Japan) Ai Miura (Rd. 2) (Japan) Tomoki Takahashi (Rd. 4)
244	Max Racing	Nissan Fairlady Z (Z34)	(Japan) Toru Tanaka (Japan) Tetsuya Tanaka (Japan) Atsushi Miyake (Japan) Kimiya Sato (Rd. 1)
ST–4 (1,501-2,000cc)
13	Endless Sports (Rd. 1-4)	Toyota 86 (ZN6)	(Japan) Ryo Ogawa (Japan) Ritomo Miyata (Japan) Takamitsu Matsui (Japan) Masaya Hanazato (Rd. 1, 4) (Japan) Togo Suganami (Rd. 1)
18	Asano Racing Service	Toyota 86 (ZN6)	(Japan) Takeo Asano (Japan) Daiki Fujiwara (Japan) Takeshi Tsuchiya (Japan) Masataka Inoue (Rd. 1-2, 4) (Japan) Kazunori Nishimura (Rd. 1, 5) (Japan) Toshikazu Shiba (Rd. 1)
60	Team G/Motion'	Honda Integra Type R (DC5)	(Japan) Resshu Shioya (Japan) Takuya Shiga (Japan) Takao Seto (Japan) Taro Matsunami (Rd. 1, 4-5) (Japan) Kazuyuki Matsumoto (Rd. 1)
54	TC Corse (Rd. 2-5)	Mazda Roadster RF (NDERC)	(Japan) Teruaki Kato (Japan) Koichi Ishii (Japan) Junji Ueda (Rd. 4) (Japan) Isao Ihashi (Rd. 4) (Japan) Hikaru Jitosho (Rd. 5) (Japan) Tetsuya Shuto (Rd. 5)
137	RacingFamily137 (Rd. 2)	Honda Integra Type R (DC5)	(Japan) Hayato Date (Japan) Takashi Iseya (Japan) Koji Takeda
225	Kobe Toyopet Motor Sports (Rd. 3-5)	Toyota 86 (ZN6)	(Japan) Seita Nonaka (Japan) Hibiki Taira (Japan) Miki Onaga
310	C.S.I Racing	Toyota 86 (ZN6)	(Japan) Rintaro Kubo (Japan) Shinya Hosokawa (Japan) Sho Tsuboi (Japan) Kota Matsui (Rd. 1)
884	Hayashi Telempu SHADE Racing	Toyota 86 (ZN6)	(Japan) Katsuyuki Hiranaka (Japan) Yuji Kunimoto (Japan) Hiro Hayashi (Japan) Keishi Ishikawa (Japan) Dai Mizuno (Rd. 1)
ST–5 (1,500cc and below)
4	Team Bride	Honda Fit3 RS (GK5)	(Japan) Hiroshi Ito (Japan) Mitsuaki Matsuo (Japan) Koji Miura (Rd. 1, 5) (Japan) Souichi Kurosu (Rd. 1) (Japan) Shunsuke Sato (Rd. 1) (Japan) Hidefumi Minami (Rd. 1) (Japan) Yuya Ohta (Rd. 2-5) (Japan) Carlos Honda (Rd. 3) (Japan) Seijiro Aihara (Rd. 4)
11	Blood Sports (Rd. 3)	Toyota Vitz (NCP131)	(Japan) Takao Onishi (Japan) Yoichi Nishino (Japan) Takahiro Miki
37	Team NOPRO	Mazda Demio Diesel Turbo (DJ5FS)	(Japan) Kaoru Ijiri (Japan) Kazunari Yoshioka (Japan) Yutaka Seki (Rd. 1-3, 5) (Japan) Yoshihiro Kato (Rd. 1-2, 4) (Japan) Junichi Agematsu (Rd. 1) (Japan) Tobio Ohtani (Rd. 5)
66	Over Drive	Mazda Roadster (ND5RC)	(Japan) Takayuki Takechi (Japan) Shuichiro Hokazono (Rd. 1, 3-4) (Japan) Shigeyasu Kanamori (Rd. 1) (Japan) Aruga Tomita (Rd. 1) (Japan) Yusuke Hashimoto (Rd. 1) (Japan) Nanami Tsukamoto (Rd. 1) (Japan) Masayuki Ueda (Rd. 2, 4) (Japan) Yugo Iwasawa (Rd. 2) (Japan) Tsuneaki Mankumo (Rd. 3) (Japan) Tatsuya Ota (Rd. 4-5) (Japan) Isao Nakashima (Rd. 5) (Japan) Hirobon (Rd. 5)
456	Over Drive	Mazda Roadster (ND5RC)	(Japan) Riku Hashimoto (Japan) Tatsuya Ota (Japan) Takaya Kusano (Rd. 1-2, 4) (Japan) Tomomitsu Senoo (Rd. 1, 3) (Japan) Koji Obara (Rd. 1, 4-5) (Japan) Carlos Honda (Rd. 1, 5) (Japan) Kousei Kanto (Rd. 3) (Japan) Ryosuke Kagami (Rd. 4) (Japan) Takafumi Katsuki (Rd. 5)
67	Team Yamato (Rd. 2-3)	Honda Fit3 RS (GK5)	(Japan) Ryohei Yasui (Japan) Shinya Uchiyama (Japan) Hideaki Ito
69	J’s Racing	Honda Fit3 RS (GK5)	(Japan) Shinsuke Umeda (Japan) Hideo Kubota (Japan) Toshihiro Kubota (Rd. 1-3, 5) (Japan) Yoshikazu Sobu (Rd. 1, 4) (Japan) Junichi Umemoto (Rd. 1) (Japan) MC Hirata (Rd. 1)
72	Nihon Automobile College	Mazda Roadster (ND5RC)	(Japan) Hiroko Komatsu (Japan) Anna Inotsume (Rd. 1-3, 5) (Japan) Tatsuya Okahara (Japan) Makoto Kanai (Japan) Yasuhiro Matsuro (Rd. 1)
50	Love Drive Racing	Mazda Roadster (ND5RC)	(Japan) Koji Yamanishi (Japan) Shui Sato (Japan) Hiroyuki Matsumura (Rd. 1, 3, 5) (Japan) Masayoshi Yamauchi (Rd. 1) (Japan) Takahiro Kimura (Rd. 1) (Japan) Katsuhiko Tsutsui (Rd. 1) (Japan) Hiroki Takenouchi (Rd. 4) (Japan) Yoshihito Shinoda (Rd. 5)
78	Love Drive Racing	Mazda Roadster (ND5RC)	(Japan) Junko Fujii (Japan) Sayaka Kato (Japan) Jco Iinuma
88	Murakami Motors	Mazda Roadster (ND5RC)	(Japan) Hiroyuki Murakami (Japan) Yasunori Nakajima (Japan) Tatsuya Tanigawa (Japan) Keiji Amemiya (Rd. 1) (Japan) Naoki Yamaya (Rd. 1)
120	Murakami Motors	Mazda Roadster (ND5RC) (Rd. 2-5)	(Japan) Haruhiko Sugino (Japan) Ikuo Maeda (Japan) Teru Nakamura (Rd. 1-3) (Japan) Takeshi Wakitani (Rd. 4-5)
102	H.M.Racers	Mazda Demio (DJLFS)	(Japan) Kota Sasaki (Japan) Soichiro Yoshida (Japan) Yugo Osaki (Japan) Junpei Kato (Rd. 1, 3-5) (Japan) Ryunosuke Yoshida (Rd. 1)
111	Hiroshima Toyopet Racing	Toyota Vitz (NCP131)	(Japan) Yasutaka Hinoi (Japan) Yuga Furutani (Japan) Atsushi Yogo (Rd. 1) (Japan) Yuya Sakamoto (Rd. 1)
182	Close Up Racing	Honda Fit3 RS (GK5)	(Japan) Riki Tanioka (Japan) Tatsuya Osaki (Japan) Kyosuke Inomata (Japan) Kazusa Nishio (Rd. 1, 3, 5) (Japan) Shigetomo Shimono (Rd. 4)
	Sources:		

== Race results ==
Round	Circuit	Race	ST-X Winners	ST-Z Winners	ST-TCR Winners	ST-1 Winners	ST-2 Winners	ST-3 Winners	ST-4 Winners	ST-5 Winners
1	Fuji		No.888 Mercedes-AMG Team Hirix Racing	No.3 Endless Sports	No.22 Waimarama Kizuna Racing Team	No.28 ROOKIE Racing	No.32 ROOKIE Racing	No.52 Saitama Toyopet GreenBrave	No.310 C.S.I Racing	No.37 Team NOPRO
1	Fuji		(Japan) Daisuke Yamawaki (Japan) Shinichi Takagi (Hong Kong) Shaun Thong (Japan) Yuki Nemoto	(Japan) Yudai Uchida (Japan) Hideki Yamauchi (Japan) Tsubasa Takahashi (Japan) Shinnosuke Yamada (Japan) Ryuichiro Tomita	(Japan) Kizuna (Japan) Katsumasa Chiyo (Japan) Hironobu Yasuda (Japan) Riki Okusa (Japan) Naoya Yamano (Japan) Toshihiro Yoshida	(Japan) Naoya Gamou (Japan) Daisuke Toyoda (Japan) Yasuhiro Ogura (Japan) Shunsuke Kohno (Japan) Hisashi Yabuki (Japan) Kazuya Oshima	(Japan) Takuto Iguchi (Japan) Masahiro Sasaki (Japan) Morizo (Japan) Norihiko Katsuta (Japan) Hiroaki Ishiura	(Japan) Naoki Hattori (Japan) Hiroki Yoshida (Japan) Kohta Kawaai (Japan) Takayuki Hiranuma	(Japan) Rintaro Kubo (Japan) Shinya Hosokawa (Japan) Sho Tsuboi (Japan) Kota Matsui	(Japan) Kaoru Ijiri (Japan) Kazunari Yoshioka (Japan) Yutaka Seki (Japan) Junichi Agematsu (Japan) Yoshihiro Kato
2	Sugo	Group 1 (Note: Sugo Group 1 race qualifying was cancelled due to weather. No qualifying points were awarded in the classes that participated in this race.)	No.16 Porsche Center Okazaki	No.3 Endless Sports	No.290 Floral Racing with Uematsu	No.28 ROOKIE Racing	No.59 TOWAINTEC Racing	No.39 Tracy Sports	did not participate	
2	Sugo	Group 1	(Japan) Hiroaki Nagai (Japan) Yuta Kamimura	(Japan) Yudai Uchida (Japan) Hideki Yamauchi (Japan) Tsubasa Takahashi	(Japan) Tadao Uematsu (Japan) Yuji Ide (Japan) Shintaro Kawabata	(Japan) Naoya Gamou (Japan) Daisuke Toyoda (Japan) Yasuhiro Ogura (Japan) Shunsuke Kohno	(Japan) Manabu Osawa (Japan) Hitoshi Gotoh (Japan) Mizuki Ishizaka	(Japan) Kazuya Oshima (Japan) Yusuke Tomibayashi (Japan) Hirotaka Ishii	did not participate	
2	Sugo	Group 2	did not participate						No.310 C.S.I Racing	No.4 Team Bride
2	Sugo	Group 2	did not participate						(Japan) Rintaro Kubo (Japan) Shinya Hosokawa (Japan) Sho Tsuboi	(Japan) Yuya Ohta (Japan) Hiroshi Ito (Japan) Mitsuaki Matsuo
3	Okayama	Group 1	No.777 D'station Racing	No.500 Team 5Zigen	No.22 Waimarama Kizuna Racing Team	No.28 ROOKIE Racing	No.59 TOWAINTEC Racing	No.39 Tracy Sports	did not participate	
3	Okayama	Group 1	(Japan) Satoshi Hoshino (Japan) Tomonobu Fujii (Japan) Tsubasa Kondo	(Japan) Ryuichiro Otsuka (Japan) Takayuki Aoki (Japan) Kazuya Shimogaki (Japan) Yuya Sakamoto	(Japan) Kizuna (Japan) Katsumasa Chiyo (Japan) Hironobu Yasuda (Japan) Riki Okusa	(Japan) Naoya Gamou (Japan) Daisuke Toyoda (Japan) Yasuhiro Ogura (Japan) Shunsuke Kohno	(Japan) Manabu Osawa (Japan) Hitoshi Gotoh (Japan) Mizuki Ishizaka	(Japan) Kazuya Oshima (Japan) Yusuke Tomibayashi (Japan) Hirotaka Ishii	did not participate	
3	Okayama	Group 2	did not participate						No.884 Hayashi Telempu SHADE Racing	No.456 Over Drive
3	Okayama	Group 2	did not participate						(Japan) Katsuyuki Hiranaka (Japan) Yuji Kunimoto (Japan) Hiro Hayashi (Japan) Keishi Ishikawa	(Japan) Riku Hashimoto (Japan) Tomomitsu Senoo (Japan) Kousei Kanto
4	Motegi		No.888 Mercedes-AMG Team Hirix Racing	No.47 D'station Racing	No.290 Floral Racing with Uematsu	did not participate	No.32 ROOKIE Racing	No.62 HELM Motorsports	No.884 Hayashi Telempu SHADE Racing	No.69 J's Racing
4	Motegi		(Japan) Daisuke Yamawaki (Hong Kong) Shaun Thong (Japan) Yuki Nemoto	(Japan) Tatsuya Hoshino (Japan) Manabu Orido (Japan) Takuro Shinohara	(Japan) Tadao Uematsu (Japan) Yuji Ide (Japan) Shintaro Kawabata	did not participate	(Japan) Takuto Iguchi (Japan) Masahiro Sasaki (Japan) Morizo	(Japan) Yuya Hiraki (Japan) Reiji Hiraki (Japan) Tomoki Takahashi	(Japan) Katsuyuki Hiranaka (Japan) Yuji Kunimoto (Japan) Hiro Hayashi (Japan) Keishi Ishikawa	(Japan) Shinsuke Umeda (Japan) Hideo Kubota (Japan) Yoshikazu Sobu
5	Autopolis		No.777 D'station Racing	No.3 Endless Sports	No.97 Racer Dome Racing	No.28 ROOKIE Racing	No.32 ROOKIE Racing	No.52 Saitama Toyopet GreenBrave	No.310 C.S.I Racing	No.456 Over Drive
5	Autopolis		(Japan) Satoshi Hoshino (Japan) Tomonobu Fujii (Japan) Tsubasa Kondo	(Japan) Yudai Uchida (Japan) Hideki Yamauchi (Japan) Tsubasa Takahashi (Japan) Togo Suganami	(Japan) Mitsuhiro Endo (Japan) Shinji Nakano (Japan) Syun Koide	(Japan) Naoya Gamou (Japan) Daisuke Toyoda (Japan) Yasuhiro Ogura (Japan) Shunsuke Kohno	(Japan) Takuto Iguchi (Japan) Masahiro Sasaki (Japan) Morizo	(Japan) Naoki Hattori (Japan) Hiroki Yoshida (Japan) Kohta Kawaai (Japan) Takayuki Hiranuma	(Japan) Rintaro Kubo (Japan) Shinya Hosokawa (Japan) Sho Tsuboi	(Japan) Riku Hashimoto (Japan) Takafumi Katsuki (Japan) Carlos Honda (Japan) Koji Obara
6	Suzuka	cancelled								

== Championship standings ==
Championship points were awarded in every class at the end of each event. On 10 June it was announced that each team's five highest-scoring rounds counted towards the final championship standings. The eventual cancellation of the Suzuka round made this change redundant for 2020.

Points systems
Duration	1st	2nd	3rd	4th	5th	6th	7th	8th	9th	10th	Pole
3 Hours / 500km	20	15	12	10	8	6	4	3	2	1	2
5 Hours / 700km	30	22.5	18	15	12	9	6	4.5	3	1.5	2
≥12 Hours / 1400km	45	35	27	23	18	13	9	7	5	3	2

=== Teams' Championship standings ===
Pos.	Car	Team	FUJ	SUG	OKA	MOT	AUT	SUZ	Points
ST–X
1	888	Mercedes-AMG Team Hirix Racing	1	**2**	Ret	1	4	C	105
2	9	MP Racing	4	3	3	3	2	C	87.5
3	81	GTNET Motor Sports	3	DNS	2	2	3	C	82.5
4	777	D'station Racing	**Ret**	5	**1**	**4**	**1**	C	81
5	31	apr	2	4	4	5	5	C	79
6	16	Porsche Center Okazaki		1	Ret			C	20
ST–Z
1	3	Endless Sports	1	1	3	2	1	C	129.5
2	47	D'station Racing	3	4	**2**	**1**	2	C	108.5
3	500	Team 5Zigen	4	5	1	3	4	C	84
4	20	SS/YZ Racing with Studie	**2**	7	8	4	7	C	65
5	19	Birth Racing Project	5	2	4	5	6	C	64
6	2	KTM Cars Japan	Ret	3	6	9	**3**	C	41
7	23	TKRI		6	5	Ret	5	C	26
8	505	Audi Team AS Sport	6	8		7		C	22
9	21	Team São Tomé and Principe with Studie		9	7	6	8	C	19.5
10	51	BEND				8		C	4.5
ST–TCR
1	290	Floral Racing with Uematsu	2	1	**2**	1	**Ret**	C	104
2	22	Waimarama Kizuna Racing Team	1	2	1	Ret	2	C	102.5
3	65	Audi Team Mars	**3**	3	3	4	3	C	86
4	97	Racer Dome Racing	4			**2**	1	C	77.5
5	33	Audi Driving Experience Japan				3		C	18
ST–1
1	28	ROOKIE Racing	**1**	**1**	**1**		**1**	C	121
2	38	Tracy Sports	2		2			C	50
3	12	Field Management Racing	3					C	27
ST–2
1	32	ROOKIE Racing	**1**	**3**	**2**	**1**	**1**	C	140
2	59	TOWAINTEC Racing	3	1	1	2	3	C	107.5
3	7	Shinryo Racing Team	4	4	4	4	2	C	80.5
4	6	Shinryo Racing Team	2	2	3	3	Ret	C	80
5	17	Team NOPRO	5	5	5	Ret		C	34
6	743	743 Honda R&D Challenge				Ret		C	0
ST–3
1	39	Tracy Sports	2	1	**1**	3	2	C	117.5
2	52	Saitama Toyopet GreenBrave	1	4	2	5	**1**	C	114
3	15	Okabe Jidosha Motorsport	**3**	2	4	4	3	C	87
4	244	Max Racing	4	Ret	3	2	4	C	72.5
5	62	HELM Motorsports		3		**1**		C	44
ST–4
1	310	C.S.I Racing	**1**	**1**	**5**	3	**1**	C	129
2	884	Hayashi Telempu SHADE Racing	3	3	1	**1**	2	C	113.5
3	18	Asano Racing Service	4	4	3	4	3	C	78
4	13	Endless Sports	2	2	2	6		C	74
5	225	Kobe Toyopet Motorsports			4	2	5	C	44.5
6	60	Team G/Motion'	5	5	Ret	5	Ret	C	38
7	54	TC Corse		Ret	6	7	4	C	27
8	137	RacingFamily137		Ret				C	0
ST–5
1	69	J's Racing	2	3	2	1	3	C	110
2	456	Over Drive	10	5	**1**	**2**	**1**	C	89.5
3	4	Team Bride	4	1	8	5	5	C	70
4	102	H.M.Racers	3	9	3	7	4	C	62
5	37	Team NOPRO	1	4	13	12	8	C	59.5
6	72	Nihon Automobile College	9	7	5	6	2	C	48.5
7	182	Close Up Racing	5	13	7	3	Ret	C	40
8	66	Over Drive	11	11	4	4	6	C	34
9	88	Murakami Motors	**6**	**2**	Ret	NC	10	C	33.5
10	111	Hiroshima Toyopet Racing	7	6	6	11	NC	C	21
11	78	Love Drive Racing	8	14	11	10	9	C	11.5
12	120	Murakami Motors		12	12	9	7	C	9
13	50	Love Drive Racing	Ret	10	10	8	Ret	C	6.5
14	67	Team Yamato		8	Ret			C	3
15	11	Blood Sports			9			C	2
Pos.	Car	Team	FUJ	SUG	OKA	MOT	AUT	SUZ	Points

Colour	Result
Gold	Winner
Silver	Second place
Bronze	Third place
Green	Points classification
Blue	Non-points classification
Blue	Non-classified finish (NC)
Purple	Retired, not classified (Ret)
Red	Did not qualify (DNQ)
Red	Did not pre-qualify (DNPQ)
Black	Disqualified (DSQ)
White	Did not start (DNS)
White	Withdrew (WD)
White	Race cancelled (C)
Blank	Did not practice (DNP)
Blank	Did not arrive (DNA)
Blank	Excluded (EX)

**Bold** – Pole
Italics – Fastest Lap
