= 2020 TCR Japan Touring Car Series =

The 2020 TCR Japan Touring Car Series was the second season of the TCR Japan Touring Car Series. The series supported the 2020 Super Formula Championship.

== Race calendar ==
The calendar was announced in 2019 with six confirmed dates with all rounds held in Japan and supporting the Super Formula Championship. A revised calendar was released in July 2020.

Round		Circuit	Original Date	Revised Date	Supporting
1	1	Sportsland Sugo	25–26 July		SUGO Champion Cup
1	2	Sportsland Sugo	25–26 July		SUGO Champion Cup
2	3	Twin Ring Motegi	29–30 August		Super Formula Championship
2	4	Twin Ring Motegi	29–30 August		Super Formula Championship
3	5	Okayama International Circuit	26–27 September		Super Formula Championship
3	6	Okayama International Circuit	26–27 September		Super Formula Championship
4	7	Autopolis	16–17 May	14–15 November	Super Formula Championship
4	8	Autopolis	16–17 May	14–15 November	Super Formula Championship
5	9	Suzuka Circuit	18–19 April	5–6 December	Super Formula Championship
5	10	Suzuka Circuit	18–19 April	5–6 December	Super Formula Championship
6	11	Fuji Speedway	14–15 November	19–20 December	Super Formula Championship
6	12	Fuji Speedway	14–15 November	19–20 December	Super Formula Championship

== Teams and drivers ==
All teams and drivers are Japanese-registered

Team	Car	No.	Drivers	Class	Rounds	Ref.
Azabu Wako's ED Nilzz NGK	Audi RS 3 LMS TCR	7	Jun Makino		2, 6	
BRP Birth Racing Project	Audi RS 3 LMS TCR	17	Kenji Suzuki		2−6	
BRP Birth Racing Project	Volkswagen Golf GTI TCR	19	'Hirobon'		1−2	
BRP Birth Racing Project	CUPRA León TCR	19	'Hirobon'		3−6	
BRP Birth Racing Project	CUPRA León TCR	190	Kengo Ichijo		1	
Audi Team Hitotsuyama	Audi RS 3 LMS TCR	21	Takuro Shinohara		All	
Audi Team Hitotsuyama	Audi RS 3 LMS TCR	101	Hideki Nakahara		2	
Volkswagen RT with Team Wakayama	Volkswagen Golf GTI TCR	25	Takeshi Matsumoto		All	
Drago Corse	Honda Civic Type R TCR (FK8)	34	Rio Shimono		All	
Wakatsuki Dream Drive with KCMG	Honda Civic Type R TCR (FK8)	45	Naoto Takeda		4	
Wakatsuki Dream Drive with KCMG	Honda Civic Type R TCR (FK8)	45	Takuya Shirasaka		5	
55 Moto with J’S Racing	Alfa Romeo Giulietta TCR	55	'Mototino'		All	
55 Moto with J’S Racing	Alfa Romeo Giulietta TCR	69	Junichi Umemoto		All	
Zenyaku Kogyo with Team G/Motion	Honda Civic Type R TCR (FK8)	62	Resshu Shioya		All	
Daiwa N Trading Akiland Racing	Honda Civic Type R TCR (FK8)	71	Masayoshi Oyama		4	
M-Prototyping Team Stile Corse	Alfa Romeo Giulietta Veloce TCR	73	Mineki Okura		All	
