= Yusuke Shiotsu =

Japanese racing driver

- Nationality: (Japan) Japanese
- Born: 7 August 1998 (age 28) Kagawa, Japan

Super GT - GT300 career
- Debut season: 2022
- Current team: Team Mach
- Car number: 5
- Former teams: GAINER
- Starts: 22
- Wins: 3
- Podiums: 5
- Poles: 1
- Fastest laps: 0
- Best finish: 8th in 2025

Previous series
- 2021 2019: Formula Regional Japanese Championship; F4 Japanese Championship

Yusuke Shiotsu (塩津 佑介, Shiotsu Yousuke; born 7 August 1998) is a Japanese racing driver.

== Career ==
=== Early career ===
Shiotsu made his racing debut in 2018 with ATEAM Buzz Racing to compete in F4 Japanese Championship. He stayed with ATEAM Buzz Racing for the 2019 season as he finished 15th in the standings.

Shiotsu competed in the Formula Regional Japanese Championship for 2021, where he started to race as a privateer, and he got two podiums. He then switched to Sutekina Racing for round 3 onwards.

=== Super GT GT300 ===
Shiotsu signed as GAINER number 10 team's third driver alongside Riki Okusa and Ryuichiro Tomita. He made his racing debut in the Autopolis round as he replaced Ryuichiro Tomita who prioritised on GT World Challenge Europe campaign. Shiotsu stayed with GAINER again for the third driver role alongside Tomita, and Keishi Ishikawa, but Shiotsu did not make any race appearances.

For 2024, Shiotsu made his full season debut in the series, as he moved to Team Mach alongside former GT300 champion Kiyoto Fujinami.

== Racing record ==
=== Career summary ===
Season	Series	Team	Races	Wins	Poles	FLaps	Podiums	Points	Position
2018	F4 Japanese Championship	ATEAM Buzz Motorsport	14	0	0	0	0	0	25th
2019	F4 Japanese Championship	ATEAM Buzz Motorsport	14	0	0	0	0	9	15th
2020	Super Taikyu - ST-Z	Birth Racing Project 【BRP】	5	0	0	0	1	64‡	5th‡
2021	Formula Regional Japanese Championship	Privateer	3	0	1	0	2	110	4th
2021	Formula Regional Japanese Championship	Sutekina Racing Team	7	0	0	0	2	110	4th
2021	TCR Japan Touring Car Series - Sunday Series	Dome Racing	1	0	1	0	1	23	11th
2021	TCR Japan Touring Car Series - Saturday Series	Dome Racing	1	0	1	0	1	22	13th
2021	Super Taikyu - ST-Z	C.S.I Racing	5	1	4	0	1	73.5‡	5th‡
2022	Super GT - GT300	GAINER	4	1	1	0	2	5	28th
2023	Super GT - GT300	GAINER	5	1	0	0	1	0	NC
2023	Super Taikyu - ST-Z	Team 5ZIGEN	1	1	1	1	1	36‡	7th‡
2024	Super GT - GT300	Team Mach	8	0	0	0	0	0	NC
2025	Super GT - GT300	Team Mach	8	1	0	0	2	67	8th
2025	Super Taikyu - ST-Z	Team Noah	1	0	0	0	0	30‡	9th‡
2026	Super GT - GT300	Team Mach	8	0	0	0	0	22	28th

=== Complete F4 Japanese Championship results ===
(key) (Races in bold indicate pole position) (Races in italics indicate fastest lap)

Year	Team	1	2	3	4	5	6	7	8	9	10	11	12	13	14	DC	Points
2018	ATEAM Buzz Motorsport	OKA; 1; 14	OKA; 2; 16	FUJ1; 1 Ret	FUJ1; 2 Ret	SUZ; 1; 13	SUZ; 2; 15	FUJ2; 1; 18	FUJ2; 2; 18	SUG; 1; 14	SUG; 2; 21	AUT; 1; 17	AUT; 2; 19	MOT; 1 Ret	MOT; 2; 12	25th	0
2019	ATEAM Buzz Motorsport	OKA; 1; 8	OKA; 2; 9	FUJ1; 1 Ret	FUJ1; 2 DNS	SUZ; 1; 11	SUZ; 2; 10	FUJ2; 1; 11	FUJ2; 2; 12	AUT; 1; 16	AUT; 2; 17	SUG; 1; 9	SUG; 2; 13	MOT; 1; 11	MOT; 2; 14	15th	9

=== Complete Formula Regional Japanese Championship results ===
(key) (Races in bold indicate pole position) (Races in italics indicate fastest lap)

Year	Team	1	2	3	4	5	6	7	8	9	10	11	12	13	Rank	Points
2021	Privateer	**OKA**; **1**; 3	OKA; 2; 5	OKA; 3; 3	MOT; 1	MOT; 2	MOT; 3								4th	110
2021	Sutekina Racing Team							FUJ; 1; 4	FUJ; 2; 3	FUJ; 3; 4	SUG; 1; 13	SUG; 2; 8	SUZ; 1; 4	SUZ; 2; 3	4th	110

=== Complete Super GT results ===
(key) (Races in bold indicate pole position) (Races in italics indicate fastest lap)

Year	Team	Car	Class	1	2	3	4	5	6	7	8	9	DC	Points
2022	GAINER	Nissan GT-R Nismo GT3	GT300	OKA; 6	FUJ; 1	SUZ	FUJ; 22	**SUZ**; **2**	SUG	AUT; 7	MOT		28th	5
2023	GAINER	Nissan GT-R Nismo GT3	GT300	OKA; Ret	FUJ1; 17	SUZ1; 5	FUJ2; 1	SUZ2; 15	SUG	AUT; 9	MOT		NC	0
2024	Team Mach	Toyota 86 MC	GT300	OKA; 22	FUJ; 18	SUZ; 25	FUJ; 15	SUG; 17	AUT; Ret	MOT; 22†	SUZ; 12		NC	0
2025	Team Mach	Toyota 86 MC	GT300	OKA; 16	FUJ; 10	SEP	FS1; 7	FS2 (4)	SUZ; 3	SUG; 9	AUT; 14	MOT; 1	8th	67
2026	Team Mach	Toyota 86 MC	GT300	OKA; 11	FUJ; 25	FUJ; 22	SUZ; 8	SUG; 26	AUT; 14	MOT; 9	MOT; 16		28th	22
