= 2021 TCR Japan Touring Car Series =

2021 Japanese touring car racing season

The 2021 TCR Japan Touring Car Series season was the third season of the TCR Japan Touring Car Series. The series supported the 2021 Super Formula Championship.

== Teams and drivers ==
Yokohama was the official tyre supplier.

Team	Car	No.	Drivers	Rounds
(Japan) Nilzz Racing	Audi RS 3 LMS TCR	7	(Japan) Keiichi Inoue	1, 4
(Japan) Nilzz Racing	Audi RS 3 LMS TCR	7	(Japan) Jun Makino	5
(Japan) Adenau IDI Golf TCR	Volkswagen Golf GTI TCR	10	(Japan) Jun Sato	1−2, 5
(Japan) Birth Racing Project	Audi RS 3 LMS TCR	17	(Japan) Kenji Suzuki	All
(Japan) Birth Racing Project	Volkswagen Golf GTI TCR	18	(Japan) Takeshi Matsumoto	3
(Japan) Birth Racing Project	CUPRA León TCR	19	(Japan) 'Kusako'	All
(Japan) Audi Team Hitotsuyama	Audi RS 3 LMS TCR	21	(Japan) Takuro Shinohara	3
(Japan) Audi Team Hitotsuyama	Audi RS 3 LMS TCR	21	(Japan) Yuki Fujii	1
(Japan) Audi Team Hitotsuyama	Audi RS 3 LMS TCR	101	(Japan) Yuki Fujii	4
(Hong Kong) Wakatsuki Dream Drive with KCMG	Honda Civic Type R TCR (FK8)	45	(Japan) Naoto Takeda	1
(Hong Kong) Wakatsuki Dream Drive with KCMG	Honda Civic Type R TCR (FK8)	45	(Japan) Takuya Shirasaka	2
(Japan) 55MOTO Racing	Honda Civic Type R TCR (FK8)	55	(Japan) 'Mototino'	3−6
(Japan) Zenyaku Kogyo with Team G/Motion	Honda Civic Type R TCR (FK8)	62	(Japan) Resshu Shioya	5−6
(Japan) Audi Team Mars	Audi RS 3 LMS TCR	65	(Japan) Masanobu Kato	All
(Japan) Daiwa N Trading Akiland Racing	Honda Civic Type R TCR (FK8)	71	(Japan) Masayoshi Oyama	All
(Japan) M-Prototyping Team Stile Corse	Alfa Romeo Giulietta Veloce TCR	73	(Japan) Mineki Okura	1−2, 4−6
(Japan) Dome Racing	Honda Civic Type R TCR (FK8)	97	(Japan) Akihiko Nakaya	1
(Japan) Dome Racing	Honda Civic Type R TCR (FK8)	97	(Japan) Ai Miura	2−3
(Japan) Dome Racing	Honda Civic Type R TCR (FK8)	97	(Japan) Yusuke Shiotsu	4
(Japan) Dome Racing	Honda Civic Type R TCR (FK8)	98	(Japan) Anna Inotsume	5−6

== Race calendar and results ==
The calendar was announced on 10 February 2021 with 6 confirmed dates with all rounds held in Japan and supporting the Super Formula Championship.

Round		Circuit	Date	Pole position	Fastest lap	Winning driver	Winning team	Supporting series
1	1	Fuji Speedway	3 April	(Japan) 'Hirobon'	(Japan) Yuki Fujii	(Japan) Keiichi Inoue	(Japan) Nilzz Racing	Super Formula
1	2	Fuji Speedway	4 April	(Japan) Yuki Fujii	(Japan) Masanobu Kato	(Japan) 'Hirobon'	(Japan) Birth Racing Project	Super Formula
2	3	Autopolis	15 May	(Japan) Takuya Shirasaka	(Japan) 'Hirobon'	(Japan) 'Hirobon'	(Japan) Birth Racing Project	Super Formula
2	4	Autopolis	16 May	(Japan) Ai Miura	Race cancelled due to heavy rain			Super Formula
3	5	Sportsland Sugo	24 July	(Japan) Takeshi Matsumoto	(Japan) Takeshi Matsumoto	(Japan) Takeshi Matsumoto	(Japan) Birth Racing Project	SUGO Champion Cup
3	6	Sportsland Sugo	24 July	(Japan) Takeshi Matsumoto	(Japan) Takeshi Matsumoto	(Japan) Takeshi Matsumoto	(Japan) Birth Racing Project	SUGO Champion Cup
3	7	Sportsland Sugo	25 July	(Japan) Takeshi Matsumoto	(Japan) Takuro Shinohara	(Japan) Takeshi Matsumoto	(Japan) Birth Racing Project	SUGO Champion Cup
4	8	Twin Ring Motegi	28 August	(Japan) 'Hirobon'	(Japan) 'Hirobon'	(Japan) 'Hirobon'	(Japan) Birth Racing Project	Super Formula
4	9	Twin Ring Motegi	29 August	(Japan) Yusuke Shiotsu	(Japan) Yusuke Shiotsu	(Japan) Yuki Fujii	(Japan) Audi Team Hitotsuyama	Super Formula
5	10	Twin Ring Motegi	16 October	(Japan) Mineki Okura	(Japan) Mineki Okura	(Japan) Mineki Okura	(Japan) M-Prototyping Team Stile Corse	Super Formula
5	11	Twin Ring Motegi	17 October	(Japan) Mineki Okura	(Japan) Mineki Okura	(Japan) 'Hirobon'	(Japan) Birth Racing Project	Super Formula
6	12	Suzuka Circuit	30 October	(Japan) 'Hirobon'	(Japan) Anna Inotsume	(Japan) Resshu Shioya	(Japan) Zenyaku Kogyo with Team G/Motion	Super Formula
6	13	Suzuka Circuit	31 October	(Japan) 'Hirobon'	(Japan) Masanobu Kato	(Japan) 'Hirobon'	(Japan) Birth Racing Project	Super Formula

== Championship standings ==
Scoring systems

Position	1st	2nd	3rd	4th	5th	6th	7th	8th	9th	10th
Points	25	18	15	12	10	8	6	4	2	1

=== TCR Japan Series ===
TCR Japan Saturday Series
Pos.	Driver	FUJ	ATP	SUG	MT1	MT2	SUZ	Pts.
1	(Japan) 'Hirobon'	**8**^{1}	1^{2}	2^{3}	**1**^{1}	3^{3}	**6**^{1}	120
2	(Japan) Masanobu Kato	Ret^{5}	3^{4}	3^{5}	5^{5}	2^{4}	3	80
3	(Japan) Mineki Okura	5	8^{5}		3^{4}	**1**^{1}	5	72
4	(Japan) Sioja Resszu					4^{2}	1^{4}	43
5	(Japan) Kenji Suzuki	6	7	5	8	7	8^{3}	41
6	(Japan) Jun Sato	2^{4}	6			5		38
7	(Japan) Masayoshi Oyama	7	5	7	Ret	6	7	36
8	(Japan) Keiichi Inoue	1^{3}			7			34
9	(Japan) Macumotó Takesi			**1**^{1}				30
10	(Japan) 'Mototino'			6	6	Ret	4^{5}	29
11	(Japan) Inocume Anna					8^{5}	2^{2}	27
12	(Japan) Miura Ai		2^{3}	Kiz^{4}				23
13	(Japan) Siocu Juszuke				2^{2}			22
14	(Japan) Siraszaka Takuja		**4**^{1}					17
15	(Japan) Sinohara Takuró			4^{2}				16
16	(Japan) Akihiko Nakaya	3						
17	(Japan) Fudzsii Júki				4^{3}			15
18	(Japan) Naoto Takeda	4						12
19	(Japan) Yuki Fujii	9^{2}						6
20	(Japan) Makinó Dzsun					9		2
Pos.	Driver	FUJ	ATP	SUG	MT1	MT2	SUZ	Pts.

TCR Japan Sunday Series
Pos.	Driver	FUJ	ATP	SG1	SG2	MT1	MT2	SUZ	Pts.
1	(Japan) 'Hirobon'	1^{2}	C	2^{4}	4^{4}	7	1^{4}	**1**^{1}	126
2	(Japan) Masanobu Kato	2^{3}	C	4^{5}	5^{5}	5^{5}	2^{2}	2^{2}	100
3	(Japan) Macumotó Takesi			**1**^{1}	**1**^{1}				60
4	(Japan) Mineki Okura	3^{4}	C			9	**4**^{1}	5^{4}	48
5	(Japan) Sinohara Takuró			3^{2}	2^{2}				41
6	(Japan) Masayoshi Oyama	9	C	7	6	3	7	8	41
7	(Japan) 'Mototino'			6	7	6	5^{3}	7	41
8	(Japan) Sioja Resszu						3^{5}	3^{5}	32
9	(Japan) Miura Ai		C	5^{3}	3^{3}				31
10	(Japan) Fudzsii Júki					1^{2}			29
11	(Japan) Siocu Juszuke					**2**^{1}			23
12	(Japan) Inocume Anna						6	4^{3}	23
13	(Japan) Keiichi Inoue	7				4			18
14	(Japan) Yuki Fujii	**4**^{1}							17
15	(Japan) Jun Sato	5^{5}	C				9		13
16	(Japan) Akihiko Nakaya	6							8
17	(Japan) Naoto Takeda	8							4
18	(Japan) Makinó Dzsun						10		1
19	(Japan) Kenji Suzuki	Ret							0
20	(Japan) Siraszaka Takuja		C						0
Pos.	Driver	FUJ	ATP	SG1	SG2	MT1	MT2	SUZ	Pts.

Colour	Result
Gold	Winner
Silver	Second place
Bronze	Third place
Green	Points classification
Blue	Non-points classification
Blue	Non-classified finish (NC)
Purple	Retired, not classified (Ret)
Red	Did not qualify (DNQ)
Red	Did not pre-qualify (DNPQ)
Black	Disqualified (DSQ)
White	Did not start (DNS)
White	Withdrew (WD)
White	Race cancelled (C)
Blank	Did not practice (DNP)
Blank	Did not arrive (DNA)
Blank	Excluded (EX)

**Bold** – Pole
Italics – Fastest Lap

† – Drivers did not finish the race, but were classified as they completed over 75% of the race distance.

=== Entrants championship ===
Pos.	Entrant	No.	FUJ		ATP		SUG			MOT1		MOT2		SUZ		Pts.
Pos.	Entrant	No.	RD1	RD2	RD1	RD2	RD1	RD2	RD3	RD1	RD2	RD1	RD2	RD1	RD1	Pts.
1	(Japan) Birth Racing Project	19	**8**^{1}	1^{2}	1^{2}	C	2^{3}	2^{4}	4^{4}	**1**^{1}	7^{4}	3^{3}	1^{4}	**6**^{1}	**1**^{1}	246
2	(Japan) Audi Team Mars	65	Ret^{5}	2^{3}	3^{4}	C	3^{5}	4^{5}	5^{5}	5^{5}	5^{5}	2^{4}	2^{2}	3	2^{2}	180
3	(Japan) Dome Racing	97	3	6	2^{3}	C	Kiz^{4}	5^{3}	3^{3}	2^{2}	**2**^{1}					122
4	(Japan) M-Prototyping Team Stile Corse	73	5	3^{4}	8^{5}	C				3^{4}	9	**1**^{1}	**4**^{1}	5	5^{4}	120
5	(Japan) Birth Racing Project	18					**1**^{1}	**1**^{1}	**1**^{1}							90
6	(Japan) Audi Team Hitotsuyama	21	9^{2}	**4**^{1}			4^{2}	3^{2}	2^{2}							80
7	(Japan) 55MOTO Racing	55					6	6	7	6	6	Ret	5^{3}	4^{5}	7	79
8	(Japan) Daiwa N Trading Akiland Racing	71	7	9	5	C	7	7	6	Ret	3	6	7	7	8	77
9	(Japan) Zenyaku Kogyo with Team G/Motion	62										4^{2}	3^{5}	1^{4}	3^{5}	75
10	(Japan) Birth Racing Project	17	6	Ret	7	C	5	8	8	8	Ret^{3}	7	8	8^{3}	6	64
11	(Japan) Nillz Racing	7	1^{3}	7						7	4	9	10			55
12	(Japan) Adenau IDI Golf TCR	10	2^{4}	5^{5}	6	C						5	9			51
12	(Japan) Dome Racing	98										8^{5}	6	2^{2}	4^{3}	50
14	(Japan) Audi Team Hitotsuyama	101								4^{3}	1^{2}					44
15	(Hong Kong) Wakatsuki Dream Drive with KCMG	45	4	8	**4**^{1}	C										31
Pos.	Driver	No.	FUJ		ATP		SUG			MOT1		MOT2		SUZ		Pts.

Colour	Result
Gold	Winner
Silver	Second place
Bronze	Third place
Green	Points classification
Blue	Non-points classification
Blue	Non-classified finish (NC)
Purple	Retired, not classified (Ret)
Red	Did not qualify (DNQ)
Red	Did not pre-qualify (DNPQ)
Black	Disqualified (DSQ)
White	Did not start (DNS)
White	Withdrew (WD)
White	Race cancelled (C)
Blank	Did not practice (DNP)
Blank	Did not arrive (DNA)
Blank	Excluded (EX)

**Bold** – Pole
Italics – Fastest Lap
