= TCR Japan Touring Car Series =

Auto racing series in Japan

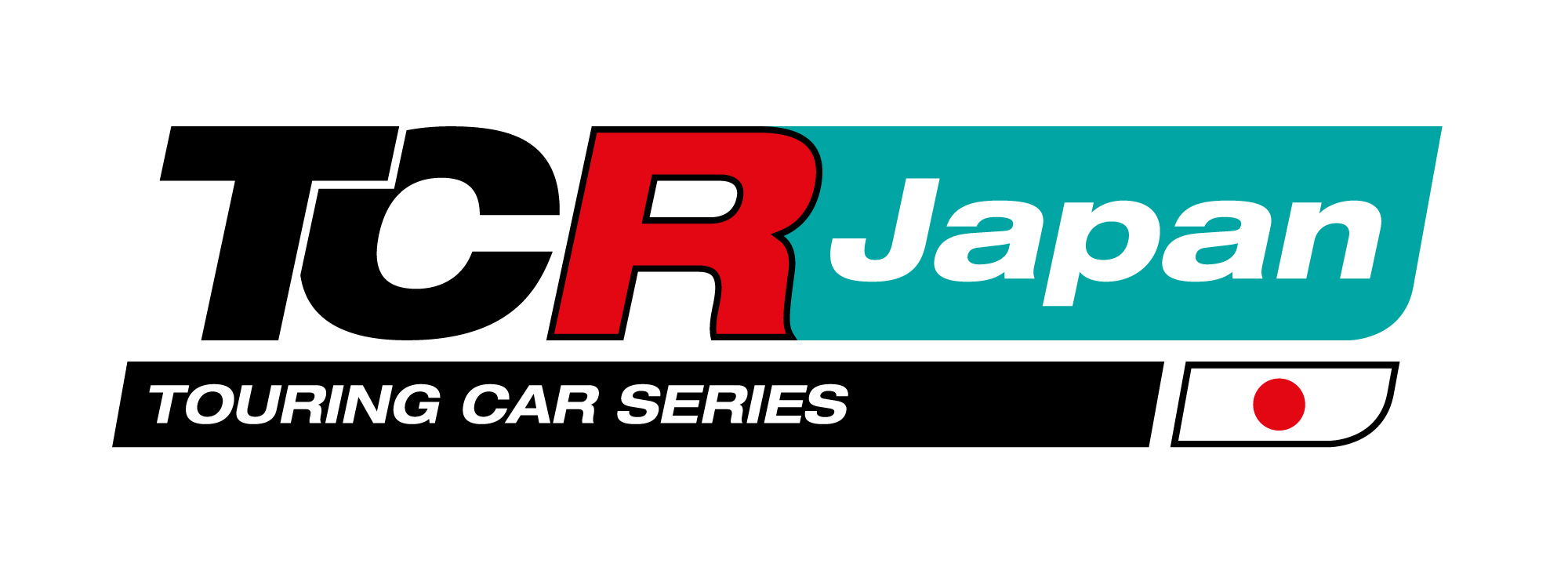
- Category: Touring cars
- Country: Japan
- Inaugural season: 2019
- Folded: 2024

The TCR Japan Touring Car Series was a former touring car racing series based in Japan, the first of its kind since Japanese Touring Car Championship folded in 1998.

In an agreement between WSC Ltd and Japan TCR Management, the TCR Japan Series began in 2019. The competition takes advantage of the success of the class in the Super Taikyu Series and runs on the same weekends as the Super Formula, the most important single-seater category in Japan. The agreement is valid for the next 6 years, until 2024. One of the goals is to attract other Japanese car manufacturers to the TCR category. In January 2025, it was announced that the series was folded.

Since its inception, the series had also supported the Super Formula Championship.

== Champions ==
Year	Saturday Series	Sunday Series	Entrants
2019	(United Kingdom) Matt Howson	(Japan) Takeshi Matsumoto	(Hong Kong) KCMG
2020	(Japan) Takuro Shinohara	(Japan) Takuro Shinohara	(Japan) Audi Team Hitotsuyama
2021	(Japan) Keiichi Inoue	(Japan) 'Hirobon'	(Japan) Birth Racing Project
2022	(Japan) 'Hirobon'	(Japan) 'Hirobon'	(Japan) Birth Racing Project
2023	(Japan) Anna Inotsume	(Japan) Anna Inotsume	(Japan) Birth Racing Project
2024	(South Korea) Choi Jeong Weon	(South Korea) Choi Jeong Weon	(Japan) KMSA Motorsport N

== Circuits ==
- (Ōita Prefecture) Autopolis (2019–2021)
- (Shizuoka Prefecture) Fuji Speedway (2019–2023)
- (Tochigi Prefecture) Motegi Circuit (2020–2024)
- (Okayama Prefecture) Okayama International Circuit (2019–2020, 2022–2023)
- (Miyagi Prefecture) Sportsland Sugo (2019–2023)
- (Mie Prefecture) Suzuka Circuit (2019–2024)
