= Anna Inotsume =

Japanese racing driver (born 1995)

- Nationality: (Japan) Japanese
- Born: 15 February 1995 (age 31) Fuchu, Japan

Formula Regional Japanese Championship career
- Debut season: 2023
- Current team: Hitotsuyama Racing
- Car number: 21
- Former teams: Bionic Jack Racing, HELM Motorsports
- Starts: 28
- Wins: 0
- Podiums: 1
- Poles: 0
- Fastest laps: 0
- Best finish: 7th in 2024

Previous series
- 2021-23 2018-19: TCR Japan Touring Car Series; Asian Le Mans Series - LMP3

Championship titles
- 2023: TCR Japan Touring Car Series

Anna Inotsume (猪爪 杏奈, Inotsume Anna; born 15 February 1995) is a Japanese racing driver who is currently competing in the 2025 Formula Regional Japanese Championship.

== Career ==
=== Formula Regional ===
Inotsume involved in her first formula racing in 2023, as she competed in Formula Regional Japanese Championship with Bionic Jack Racing for Fuji Speedway round. Inotsume would make her first full season debut in the series for 2024 as she race with HELM Motorsports. She clinched her first podium in Fuji as she finished second. She would continue again to her second full season for 2025.

=== Super Taikyu ===
Inotsume would racing in Super Taikyu in 2018 as she race in ST-5 class with Love Drive Racing. She returned to the series in 2020, but with Nihon Automobile College. She ran with the same team the flowwing year in 2021. She then raced in the ST-2 class with Claris Racing in 2022. For 2023, she did a round for Birth Racing Project to race in Fuji 24 Hours. Inotsume would make her full season in ST-X with Birth Racing Project as well for 2024.

== Racing record ==
=== Racing career summary ===
Season	Series	Team	Races	Wins	Poles	F/Laps	Podiums	Points	Position
2018	Super Taikyu - ST-5	Love Drive Racing with NATS	6	0	0	0	1	35.5‡	9th‡
2018–19	Asian Le Mans Series - LMP3	R24	1	0	0	0	0	6	NC
2020	Super Taikyu - ST-5	Nihon Automobile College	4	0	0	0	1	48.5‡	6th‡
2020	Kyojo Cup	Dr.Dry	4	1	1	1	3	53.5	**3rd**
2021	TCR Japan - Saturday Series	Dome Racing	2	0	0	1	1	27	11th
2021	TCR Japan - Sunday Series	Dome Racing	2	0	0	0	0	23	11th
2021	Super Taikyu - ST-5	Nihon Automobile College	5	0	2	1	2	70‡	**3rd‡**
2021	Kyojo Cup	Dr.Dry	4	0	0	0	0	25	6th
2022	TCR Japan Touring Car Series	Dome Racing	12	2	1	3	9	153	**2nd**
2022	Super Taikyu - ST-2	Claris Racing	3	0	0	0	0	27‡	7th‡
2022	Kyojo Cup	ALBA	4	1	0	0	4	70	**2nd**
2023	TCR Japan Touring Car Series	Hagoromo 6 DOME RACING	10	5	4	4	7	126	**1st**
2023	Formula Regional Japanese Championship	Bionic Jack Racing	2	0	0	0	0	22	16th
2023	Super Taikyu - ST-Z	Birth Racing Project 【BRP】	1	0	0	0	0	60.5‡	6th‡
2024	Formula Regional Japanese Championship	HELM Motorsports	14	0	0	0	1	98	7th
2024	Super Taikyu - ST-Z	Birth Racing Project 【BRP】	7	0	0	1	1	53.5‡	9th‡
2025	Formula Regional Japanese Championship	Hitotsuyama Racing	15	0	0	0	0	75	6th
2025	Super Taikyu – ST-X	Hitotsuyama Racing	5	0	0	0	2	58.5‡	5th‡
2026	Super Taikyu Series – ST-USA	Birth Racing Project【BRP】						*	*
Ref:

* Season still in progress

=== Complete Formula Regional Japanese Championship results ===
(key) (Races in bold indicate pole position) (Races in italics indicate fastest lap)

Year	Entrant	1	2	3	4	5	6	7	8	9	10	11	12	13	14	15	16	Pos	Points
2023	Bionic Jack Racing	FUJ1; 1	FUJ1; 2	FUJ1; 3	SUZ; 1	SUZ; 2	OKA; 1	OKA; 2	OKA; 3	MOT; 1	MOT; 2	MOT; 3	FUJ2; 1; 5	FUJ2; 2; 4	SUG; 1	SUG; 2	SUG; 3	16th	11
2024	HELM Motorsports	SUZ; 1; 6	SUZ; 2 Ret	SUZ; 3; 6	SUG; 1; 6	SUG; 2; 7	OKA; 1; 5	OKA; 2; 6	OKA; 3; 5	MOT; 1 Ret	MOT; 2; 5	FUJ1; 1; 2	FUJ1; 2; 5	FUJ2; 1; 10	FUJ2; 2; 10			7th	98
2025	Hitotsuyama Racing	OKA; 1; 5	OKA; 2; 6	OKA; 3; 6	FUJ1; 1 Ret	FUJ1; 2; 10	SUZ1; 1; 6	SUZ1; 2; 10	SUG; 1; 5	SUG; 2; 8	SUG; 3; 7	FUJ2; 1; 9	FUJ2; 2; 8	SUZ2; 1; 7	SUZ2; 2; 6	SUZ2; 3; 8		6th	75
