= 2023 TCR Japan Touring Car Series =

The 2023 TCR Japan Touring Car Series season was the fifth season of the TCR Japan Touring Car Series.

== Teams and drivers ==
Team	Car	No.	Drivers	Rounds
(South Korea) KMSA Motorsport N	Hyundai Elantra N TCR	3	(South Korea) Choi Jeongweon	3–5
(South Korea) KMSA Motorsport N	Hyundai Elantra N TCR	65	(Japan) Masanobu Kato	5
(Japan) Tamada Racing / Team LeMans	Audi RS 3 LMS TCR	7	(Japan) Seiji Tamada	All
(Japan) Tamada Racing / Team LeMans	Audi RS 3 LMS TCR	7	(Japan) Tobio Otani	5
(Japan) Birth Racing Project	Audi RS 3 LMS TCR	17	(Japan) Kenji Suzuki	1–4
(Japan) Birth Racing Project	Audi RS 3 LMS TCR	17	(Japan) Kento Kimura	5
(Japan) Birth Racing Project	CUPRA Leon Competición TCR	19	(Japan) "Hirobon"	1–2, 5
(Japan) Birth Racing Project	CUPRA Leon Competición TCR	19	(Japan) Takeshi Suehiro	3–4
(Japan) 55MOTO Racing	Honda Civic Type R TCR	55	(Japan) "Mototino"	All
(Japan) Audi Team Mars	Audi RS 3 LMS TCR	65	(Japan) Masanobu Kato	1–4
(Japan) J's Racing	Honda Civic Type R TCR (FK8)	69	(Japan) Junichi Umemoto	All
(Japan) J's Racing	Honda Civic Type R TCR (FL5)	690	(Japan) Hideo Kubota	4
(Japan) Hagoromo Six DOME Racing	Honda Civic Type R TCR	98	(Japan) Anna Inotsume	All

== Race calendar and results ==
The calendar was announced on 3 January 2023 with 5 confirmed dates with all rounds held in Japan.

Round		Circuit	Date	Pole position	Fastest lap	Winning driver	Winning team
1	1	Suzuka Circuit	13 May	(Japan) Anna Inotsume	(Japan) "Hirobon"	(Japan) Anna Inotsume	(Japan) Hagoromo Six DOME Racing
1	2	Suzuka Circuit	14 May	(Japan) "Hirobon"	(Japan) Anna Inotsume	(Japan) Anna Inotsume	(Japan) Hagoromo Six DOME Racing
2	3	Okayama International Circuit	10 June	(Japan) Anna Inotsume	(Japan) Anna Inotsume	(Japan) Anna Inotsume	(Japan) Hagoromo Six DOME Racing
2	4	Okayama International Circuit	11 June	(Japan) "Hirobon"	(Japan) Anna Inotsume	(Japan) Anna Inotsume	(Japan) Hagoromo Six DOME Racing
3	5	Twin Ring Motegi	19 August	(Japan) Takeshi Suehiro	(Japan) Takeshi Suehiro	(Japan) Takeshi Suehiro	(Japan) Birth Racing Project
3	6	Twin Ring Motegi	20 August	(Japan) Takeshi Suehiro	(Japan) Takeshi Suehiro	(Japan) Takeshi Suehiro	(Japan) Birth Racing Project
4	7	Fuji Speedway	7 October	(Japan) Anna Inotsume	(Japan) Anna Inotsume	(Japan) Anna Inotsume	(Japan) Hagoromo Six DOME Racing
4	8	Fuji Speedway	8 October	(Japan) Anna Inotsume	(Japan) Takeshi Suehiro	(Japan) Takeshi Suehiro	(Japan) Birth Racing Project
5	9	Sportsland Sugo	25 November	(South Korea) Choi Jeongweon	(Japan) "Hirobon"	(South Korea) Choi Jeongweon	(South Korea) KMSA Motorsport N
5	10	Sportsland Sugo	26 November	(Japan) Tobio Otani	(Japan) Tobio Otani	(Japan) Tobio Otani	(Japan) Tamada Racing / Team LeMans

== Championship standings ==
Scoring systems

Position	1st	2nd	3rd	4th	5th	6th	7th	8th	9th	10th
Qualify	5	4	3	2	1	—				
Race	25	18	15	12	10	8	6	4	2	1

=== TCR Japan Series ===
TCR Japan Saturday Series
Pos.	Driver	SUZ	OKA	MOT	FUJ	SUG	Pts.
1	(Japan) Anna Inotsume	**1**^{1}	**1**^{1}	Ret^{2}	**1**^{1}	4^{4}	108
2	(Japan) Masanobu Kato	3^{4}	3^{5}	3^{4}	DNS	3^{2}	69
3	(Japan) "Hirobon"	2^{2}	4^{3}			2^{3}	58
4	(Japan) "Mototino"	5^{5}	Ret^{2}	2^{3}	5	7	52
5	(Japan) Takeshi Suehiro			**1**^{1}	2^{3}		51
6	(Japan) Junichi Umemoto	6	2^{4}	Ret	4^{4}	6	50
7	(Japan) Kenji Suzuki	4^{3}	5	5^{5}	6^{5}		45
8	(South Korea) Choi Jeongweon			6†	7	**1**^{1}	44
9	(Japan) Seiji Tamada	7	6	4	8	8	34
10	(Japan) Hideo Kubota				3^{2}		19
11	(Japan) Kento Kimura					5^{5}	11
	(Japan) Tobio Otani					WD	
Pos.	Driver	SUZ	OKA	MOT	FUJ	SUG	Pts.

TCR Japan Sunday Series
Pos.	Driver	SUZ	OKA	MOT	FUJ	SUG	Pts.
1	(Japan) Anna Inotsume	1^{2}	1^{2}	Ret^{2}	**2**^{1}	2^{2}	107
2	(Japan) "Mototino"	3^{3}	3^{4}	4^{5}	4^{5}	4	73
3	(Japan) Masanobu Kato	4^{4}	2^{3}	2^{4}	Ret	8^{5}	60
4	(Japan) Takeshi Suehiro			**1**^{1}	1^{3}		58
5	(Japan) "Hirobon"	**2**^{1}	**5**^{1}			3^{3}	56
6	(Japan) Junichi Umemoto	6^{5}	4	6	6^{4}	5	49
7	(South Korea) Choi Jeongweon			3^{3}	3	7	39
8	(Japan) Kenji Suzuki	5	7^{5}	5	7		33
9	(Japan) Tobio Otani					**1**^{1}	30
10	(Japan) Seiji Tamada	Ret	6	7	5	WD	24
11	(Japan) Kento Kimura					6^{4}	10
12	(Japan) Hideo Kubota				Ret^{2}		4
Pos.	Driver	SUZ	OKA	MOT	FUJ	SUG	Pts.

Colour	Result
Gold	Winner
Silver	Second place
Bronze	Third place
Green	Points classification
Blue	Non-points classification
Blue	Non-classified finish (NC)
Purple	Retired, not classified (Ret)
Red	Did not qualify (DNQ)
Red	Did not pre-qualify (DNPQ)
Black	Disqualified (DSQ)
White	Did not start (DNS)
White	Withdrew (WD)
White	Race cancelled (C)
Blank	Did not practice (DNP)
Blank	Did not arrive (DNA)
Blank	Excluded (EX)

**Bold** – Pole
Italics – Fastest Lap
^{1} ^{2} ^{3} ^{4} ^{5} – Points-scoring position in qualifying

† – Drivers did not finish the race, but were classified as they completed over 75% of the race distance.

=== Entrants championship ===
Pos.	Entrant	No.	SUZ		OKA		MOT		FUJ		SUG		Pts.
1	(Japan) Birth Racing Project	19	2^{2}	**2**^{1}	4^{3}	**5**^{1}	**1**^{1}	**1**^{1}	2^{3}	1^{3}	2^{3}	3^{3}	223
2	(Japan) Hagoromo Six DOME Racing	98	**1**^{1}	1^{2}	**1**^{1}	1^{2}	Ret^{2}	Ret^{2}	**1**^{1}	**2**^{1}	4^{4}	2^{2}	215
3	(Japan) 55MOTO Racing	55	5^{5}	3^{3}	Ret^{2}	3^{4}	2^{3}	4^{5}	5	4^{5}	7	4	125
4	(Japan) Audi Team Mars	65	3^{4}	4^{4}	3^{5}	2^{3}	3^{4}	2^{4}	DNS	Ret			105
5	(Japan) J's Racing	69	6	6^{5}	2^{4}	4	Ret	6	4^{4}	6^{4}	6	5	99
6	(Japan) Birth Racing Project	17	4^{3}	5	5	7^{5}	5^{5}	5	6^{5}	7	5^{5}	6^{4}	99
7	(Japan) Tamada Racing / Team LeMans	7	7	Ret	6	6	4	7	8	5	8	**1**^{1}	88
8	(South Korea) KMSA Motorsport N	3					6†	3^{3}	7	3	**1**^{1}	7	83
9	(South Korea) KMSA Motorsport N	65									3^{2}	8^{5}	24
10	(Japan) J's Racing	690							3^{2}	Ret^{2}			23
Pos.	Driver	No.	SUZ		OKA		MOT		FUJ		SUG		Pts.

Colour	Result
Gold	Winner
Silver	Second place
Bronze	Third place
Green	Points classification
Blue	Non-points classification
Blue	Non-classified finish (NC)
Purple	Retired, not classified (Ret)
Red	Did not qualify (DNQ)
Red	Did not pre-qualify (DNPQ)
Black	Disqualified (DSQ)
White	Did not start (DNS)
White	Withdrew (WD)
White	Race cancelled (C)
Blank	Did not practice (DNP)
Blank	Did not arrive (DNA)
Blank	Excluded (EX)

**Bold** – Pole
Italics – Fastest Lap
^{1} ^{2} ^{3} ^{4} ^{5} – Points-scoring position in qualifying

† – Drivers did not finish the race, but were classified as they completed over 75% of the race distance.
