= Japanese Touring Car Championship =

Auto racing series in Japan

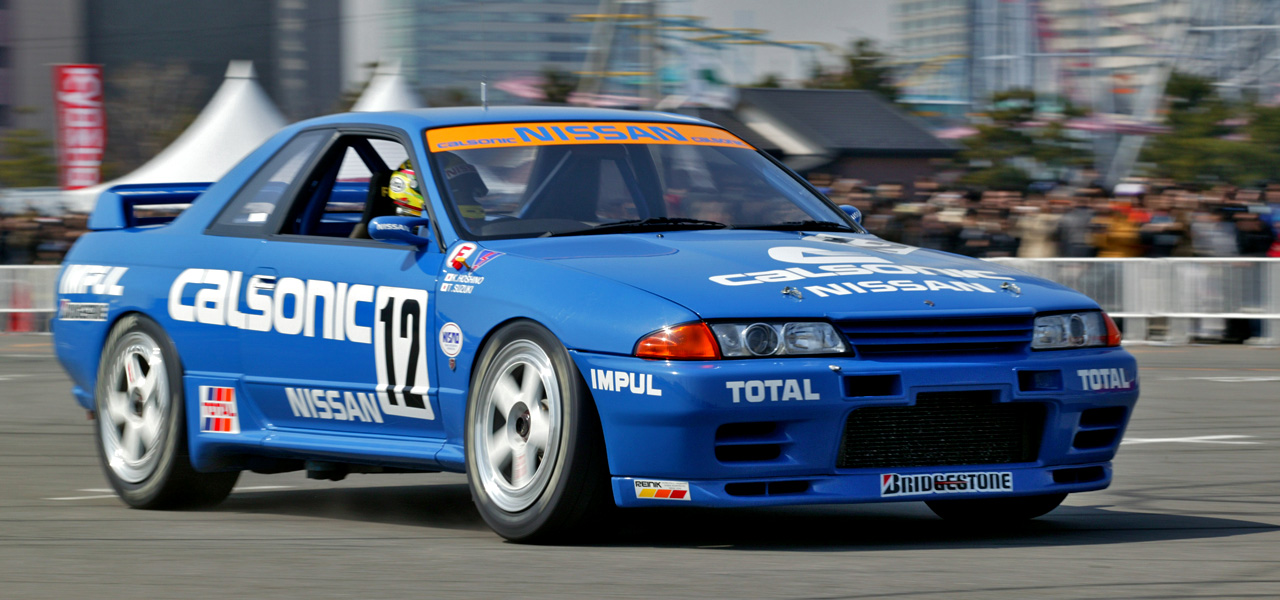
- An R32 Nissan Skyline GT-R that dominated the series' Group A era
- Category: Touring car racing
- Country: Japan
- Inaugural season: 1985
- Folded: 1998
- Last Drivers' champion: Masanori Sekiya
- Last Teams' champion: TOM'S

The Japanese Touring Car Championship (abbr: 1985–1993: JTC, 1994–1998: JTCC, officially known as All Japan Touring Car Championship, Japanese: 全日本ツーリングカー選手権) was a former touring car racing series held in Japan. The series was held under various regulations during its existence, including international categories such as Group A and Super Touring, which allowed both Japanese and foreign built cars to compete. The final edition of the championship was held in 1998, although a failed attempt at a relaunch was planned for 2012. A relaunched series, the TCR Japan Touring Car Series, ran from 2019 to 2024, using TCR regulations.

== History ==
The series had its start from the late 1960s and was dominated by the C10 Skyline GT-Rs until the Mazda Savanna RX-3 ended its dominance of the series. With the emergence of Group 5 cars in the latter half of the 1970s, the series was succeeded in 1979 by the Super Silhouette class, which was held as a support race to the Fuji Grand Champion Series. The series was incorporated and then later dissolved in 1984 by the All Japan Sports Prototype Championship.

The series then saw a revival in 1985 for Group A cars, and as was done in other countries, there were three divisions and by the late 1980s, division 3 would be fought between Toyota Supras, Nissan Skylines and the European Ford Sierra RS500, whilst division 2 was mainly fought between BMW M3s and division 1 was disputed between the Honda Civic and Toyota Corolla. Their biggest race of the season was the InterTEC 500 km (International Touring Car Endurance Championship) which took place at Fuji Speedway in November, which often attracted the top teams and drivers from the European and Australian championships. Top touring car drivers such as Tom Walkinshaw, Peter Brock, Allan Moffat, Allan Grice and Klaus Niedzwiedz often travelled to Fuji for the race. In 1987, InterTEC was also part of the World Touring Car Championship calendar. The "Super TEC" name used for the Fuji 24 Hours race serves as a tribute to the former InterTEC race.

By 1993, like many other Group A series, the series had ended up becoming a one make affair with the GT-R solely appearing in the top category (which maintained a four-year undefeated streak), followed by the M3s in the secondary category, whereas the JTC-3 division (the top and lowest divisions swapped numbers in 1988) only consisted of Corollas and Civics. For the following year, the series would switch to the FIA Supertouring formula. The cars entered by Japan's big three manufacturers for the then-new formula were initially the Nissan Primera, Honda Civic Ferio, Accord, and Toyota Corona as well as the E110 Corolla. The final round of the inaugural Supertouring-era season was also part of the 1994 Asia-Pacific Touring Car Championship. 1995 saw the Supertouring-era's only all-foreign championship victory with Steve Soper in a Team Schnitzer BMW 318i. By 1997, as the Class II formula cars became more expensive and complicated - a problem that started to plague international series using the ruleset - and due to heavy competition from JGTC, organisers would make changes to the rules to suit fan and attendee demands for closer and more competitive racing. Rule changes included increased body width (allowing Toyota to use the larger Toyota Chaser) and increased exhaust noise limits, as well as implementing restrictions on front aerodynamic devices.

In 1998, the withdrawals of Nissan due to financial problems and Honda leaving to concentrate on its Formula One program (at the time, an engine supply operation by Mugen Motorsports) and also realising it would be less expensive for them to race their NSX in the Japanese Grand Touring Championship left Toyota as the sole factory manufacturer to have cars competing using their Corona EXIVs and Chasers. Occasionally, a pair of independently run Subaru Impreza wagons did race against the factory Toyotas. Both Nissan and Honda did take part in the British Touring Car Championship after leaving the JTCC, however those programs were run by their respective European branches with independently managed budgets and teams. In 1999, a new formula using spaceframe cars, renamed Super Silhouette Car Championship came to nothing and the series was abandoned altogether as by then, Japan's big three auto manufacturers had works entries in the JGTC, now known as Super GT.

The JTCC was to be resurrected in 2013, with Super 2000 car regulations and a calendar consisting of five races in Japan and one in China, in partnership with the Chinese Touring Car Championship. The series had originally planned to return in 2012, but this was indefinitely delayed due to Tōhoku earthquake and tsunami that occurred earlier, and it was never heard around since 2014. Touring car racing ultimately returned to Japan with the TCR Japan Touring Car Series in 2019, under TCR regulations and as support to Super Formula; TCR cars had been previously allowed to race in Super Taikyu Series in 2017. However, the TCR Japan series suffered from low entries, resulting in the series folding at the end of the 2024 season.

During the championship's life, one fatal accident occurred: Akira Hagiwara was killed in a 1986 Sportsland SUGO testing session after he crashed into a barrier and his car burst into flames.

== Championship winners ==
=== JTC (1985–1993) ===
(Italics indicates co-driver who scored the same number of points as first place, but was classified second due to completing less mileage)

==== JTC-1 ====
The JTC-1 class, also known as Division 1, was eligible for cars with displacements of 2,501 cc or higher. Between 1985 and 1987 it was known as Division 3.

Year	Drivers' Champion			Manufacturers' Champion
Year	Winner	Team	Car	Manufacturers' Champion
1985	(Japan) Naoki Nagasaka (Japan) Kazuo Mogi	Beaurex	BMW 635CSi	BMW
1986	(Japan) Aguri Suzuki	NISMO	Nissan Skyline RS	Nissan
1987	(Japan) Naoki Nagasaka	Object T	Ford Sierra RS Cosworth, Ford Sierra RS500	Ford
1988	(Japan) Hisashi Yokoshima	Object T	Ford Sierra RS Cosworth, Ford Sierra RS500	Ford
1989	(Japan) Masahiro Hasemi (Sweden) Anders Olofsson	Hasemi	Nissan HR31 Skyline GTS-R	Ford
1990	(Japan) Kazuyoshi Hoshino (Japan) Toshio Suzuki	Impul	Nissan BNR32 Skyline GT-R	Nissan
1991	(Japan) Masahiro Hasemi (Sweden) Anders Olofsson	Hasemi	Nissan BNR32 Skyline GT-R	Nissan
1992	(Japan) Masahiro Hasemi (Japan) Hideo Fukuyama	Hasemi	Nissan BNR32 Skyline GT-R	Nissan
1993	(Japan) Masahiko Kageyama	Impul	Nissan BNR32 Skyline GT-R	Nissan

==== JTC-2 ====
The JTC-2 class, also known as Division 2, was eligible for cars with displacements between 1,601 – 2,500 cc.

Year	Winner	Car
1985	(Japan) Seiichiro Tsujimoto	Nissan Silvia
1986	(Japan) Yoshinari Takasugi	Mitsubishi Mirage
1987	(Japan) Haruto Yanagida	BMW M3
1988	(Japan) Haruto Yanagida (United Kingdom) Will Hoy	BMW M3
1989	(Japan) Kenji Takahashi	BMW M3
1990	(Austria) Roland Ratzenberger (Japan) Takamasa Nakagawa	BMW M3
1991	(Austria) Roland Ratzenberger (Sweden) Thomas Danielsson	BMW M3
1992	(Japan) Kazuo Mogi	BMW M3
1993	(United Kingdom) Andrew Gilbert-Scott (Japan) Akihiko Nakaya	BMW M3

==== JTC-3 ====
The JTC-3 class, also known as Division 3, was eligible for cars with displacements of 1,600 cc or lower. Between 1985 and 1987 it was known as Division 1.

Year	Drivers' Champion			Manufacturers' Champion
Year	Winner	Team	Car	Manufacturers' Champion
1985	(Japan) Kaoru Hoshino	Object T	Toyota Corolla Levin AE86	Toyota
1986	(Japan) Kaoru Ito (Japan) Tomohiko Tsutsumi	Object T	Honda Civic Si E-AT	Toyota
1987	(Japan) Osamu Nakako (Japan) Hideki Okada	Mugen	Honda Civic Si E-AT	Honda
1988	(Japan) Osamu Nakako (Japan) Hideki Okada	Mugen	Honda Civic SiR EF3	Honda
1989	(Japan) Kazuo Mogi / (Japan) Sakae Obata	Tsuchiya Engineering	Toyota Corolla Levin AE92	Honda
1990	(Japan) Keiichi Suzuki (Japan) Morio Nitta	Tsuchiya Engineering	Toyota Corolla Levin AE92	Honda
1991	(Japan) Osamu Nakako / (Japan) Hideki Okada	Mugen	Honda Civic SiR EF9	Honda
1992	(Japan) Osamu Nakako (Japan) Hideki Okada	Mugen	Honda Civic SiR EF9, Honda Civic SiR EG6	Honda
1993	(Japan) Naoki Hattori (Japan) Katsutomo Kaneishi	Mooncraft	Honda Civic SiR EG6	Honda

=== JTCC (1994–1998) ===
Year	Drivers' Champion			Teams' Champion
Year	Winner	Team	Car	Teams' Champion
1994	(Japan) Masanori Sekiya	TOM'S	Toyota Corona E	Schnitzer
1995	(United Kingdom) Steve Soper	Schnitzer	BMW 318i	Schnitzer
1996	(Japan) Naoki Hattori	Mooncraft	Honda Accord	JACCS
1997	(Japan) Osamu Nakako	Mugen	Honda Accord	Mugen
1998	(Japan) Masanori Sekiya	TOM'S	Toyota Chaser	TOM'S

== See also ==
- Super GT
- TCR Japan Touring Car Series
