= Okayama International Circuit =

Motorsport track in Japan

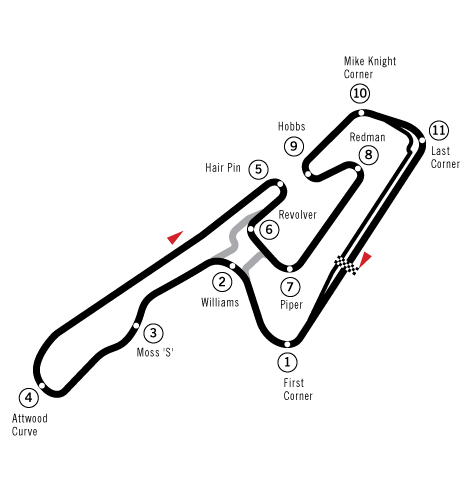
- Grand Prix Circuit (1990–present)
- Location: Mimasaka, Okayama Prefecture, Japan
- Coordinates: 34°54′54″N 134°13′16″E
- FIA Grade: 2
- Owner: Aska Corporation (March 2012–present); Unimat Corporation (April 2004–March 2012); Tanaka International (November 1990–April 2004)
- Broke ground: 1989
- Opened: 18 November 1990; 35 years ago
- Former names: TI Circuit Aida (November 1990–December 2004)
- Major events: Current: Super GT (1999–2019, 2021–present); GT World Challenge Asia (2022–2026); SRO Japan Cup (2022–present); Super Formula Lights (1994–1995, 1998–2020, 2022–present); Former: Formula One; Pacific Grand Prix (1994–1995); WTCC; Race of Japan (2008–2010); FRJC (2020–2025); Super Formula (2007–2008, 2015–2020); Formula BMW Pacific (2009–2010); Formula V6 Asia (2008); Japan Le Mans Challenge (2006–2007)
- Website: http://www.okayama-international-circuit.jp/

Grand Prix Circuit (1990–present)
- Length: 3.703 km (2.301 mi)
- Turns: 13
- Race lap record: 1:14.023 ( (Germany) Michael Schumacher, Benetton B194, 1994, F1)

Motorcycle Circuit (2020–present)
- Length: 3.747 km (2.328 mi)
- Turns: 17
- Race lap record: 1:29.889 ( (Japan) Yuki Okamoto, Yamaha YZF-R1, 2024, SBK)

Piper Circuit (1990–present)
- Length: 1.956 km (1.215 mi)
- Turns: 8

Okayama International Circuit Co., Ltd. 株式会社岡山国際サーキット
- Type: Kabushiki gaisha
- Founded: Aida (part of Mimasaka), Okayama Prefecture, Japan (13 August 1988)
- Headquarters: Mimasaka, Okayama Prefecture, Japan
- Parent: Aska Corporation

Okayama International Circuit (岡山国際サーキット), formerly known as TI Circuit Aida (TIサーキット英田) before 2005, is a 3.703 km (2.301 mi) private motorsport race track in Mimasaka, Okayama Prefecture, Japan. TI was the abbreviation of "Tanaka International" after the name of the golf club owner, Hajime Tanaka, though the name of the circuit was officially "TI Circuit Aida".

As well as hosting racing events, the circuit has rental facilities including bikes and go karts available.

== History ==
The course was opened in 1990 as a private motor racing track for the wealthy. Soon, it hosted its first race, staged by veteran British drivers.

In 1994 and 1995, the TI Circuit hosted the Formula One Pacific Grand Prix; both events were won by Michael Schumacher in his early title-winning years. This race made Japan one of only nine countries to ever host more than one Formula One event in the same year (Autopolis was planned to host a second Japanese race in 1993, but it never came to fruition). It was discontinued primarily due to its location in a remote area of the country. The event was also planned to host a race of the 1996 International Touring Car Championship season in August to replace the F1 race, but the race was instead moved to Suzuka Circuit, held in November.

In 1999, defending JGTC GT300 champion Shingo Tachi was killed when he tested a GT500 Toyota Supra after he suffered from a technical failure that prevented him from slowing down for the first turn. Although there was no driver fatality in the JGTC or Super GT race events beforehand, the incident occurred almost a year after Tetsuya Ota's near-fatal, fiery accident at Fuji Speedway.

In March 2003, the Tanaka International Company, parent company of the official circuit owner TI Circuit Company, applied for civil rehabilitation. After the application, Unimat Holding Co., Ltd. announced that it would financially support the TI Circuit Company in keeping the facility open. The company was renamed Okayama International Circuit Co., Ltd. on 1 May 2004, and the circuit was renamed Okayama International Circuit on 1 January 2005.

On 26 October 2008, the circuit hosted a round of the Formula V6 Asia and FIA World Touring Car Championship. The WTCC race was the first FIA world championship race since 1995. However, it was announced on 21 June 2010 that Suzuka Circuit would host the Japan round of the 2011 WTCC season instead of the Okayama International Circuit.

On 3 March 2012, Unimat sold the circuit to Aska Corporation, an auto parts manufacturing company.

== Events ==
Current

- April: Super GT, Ferrari Challenge Japan
- May: Porsche Carrera Cup Japan
- June: Super Formula Lights, F4 Japanese Championship
- August: GT World Challenge Asia, SRO Japan Cup
- September: MFJ Superbikes
- October: Super Taikyu

Former

- Asian Le Mans Series
  - 1000 km of Okayama (2009)
- Formula BMW Pacific (2009–2010)
- Formula Dream (2002–2003, 2005)
- Formula One
  - Pacific Grand Prix (1994–1995)
- Formula Regional Japanese Championship (2020–2025)
- Formula Toyota (2005–2006)
- Formula V6 Asia (2008)
- Japan Le Mans Challenge (2006–2007)
- Japanese Touring Car Championship (1992–1995, 1997–1998)
- Super Formula Championship (2007–2008, 2015–2020)
- TCR Japan Touring Car Series (2019–2020, 2022–2023)
- World Touring Car Championship
  - FIA WTCC Race of Japan (2008–2010)

== Lap records ==
The outright unofficial all-time track record is 1:10.218, set by triple-world champion Ayrton Senna in a Williams FW16, during qualifying for the 1994 Pacific Grand Prix. As of August 2026, the fastest official race lap records at the Okayama International Circuit are listed as:

Category	Time	Driver	Vehicle	Event
Grand Prix Circuit (1990–present): 3.703 km (2.301 mi)
Formula One	1:14.023	Michael Schumacher	Benetton B194	1994 Pacific Grand Prix
Super Formula	1:15.237	Nick Cassidy	Dallara SF19	2020 Okayama Super Formula round
Formula Nippon	1:19.345	Satoshi Motoyama	Lola FN06	2008 Okayama Formula Nippon round
Super GT (GT500)	1:19.710	Takashi Kogure	Honda NSX-GT	2018 Okayama GT 300 km Race
LMP1	1:20.561	Jonny Cocker (Note: 2009 1000 km of Okayama Race 2 - Stint Summary for Car 87 - Car Stint Report)	Lola-Aston Martin B09/60	2009 1000 km of Okayama
LMP900	1:21.298	Hiroki Katoh	Zytek 04S	2006 Okayama JLMC round
Formula Three	1:21.380	Álex Palou	Dallara F314	2017 1st Okayama Japanese F3 round
Super Formula Lights	1:22.281	Iori Kimura	Dallara 320	2022 Okayama Super Formula Lights round
LMP2	1:24.948	Matthieu Lahaye (Note: 2009 1000 km of Okayama Race 2 - Stint Summary for Car 24 - Car Stint Report)	Pescarolo 01	2009 1000 km of Okayama
Super GT (GT300)	1:26.304	Naoya Gamou	Mercedes-AMG GT3	2017 Okayama GT 300 km Race
Formula Regional	1:26.315	Tokiya Suzuki	Dome F111/3	2025 Okayama FRJC round
Superbike	1:28.153	Katsuyuki Nakasuga	Yamaha YZF-R1	2017 Okayama All Japan Road Race Championship Superbike round
GT3	1:28.513	Luo Kailuo	Ferrari 296 GT3	2025 Okayama GT World Challenge Asia round
Porsche Carrera Cup	1:29.161	Tsubasa Kondo	Porsche 911 (992 I) GT3 Cup	2022 Okayama Porsche Carrera Cup Japan round
Formula Renault 3.5	1:29.311	Earl Bamber	Tatuus FRV6	2008 Okayama Formula V6 Asia round
GT1 (GTS)	1:30.359	Carlo van Dam (Note: 2009 1000 km of Okayama Race 2 - Stint Summary for Car 50 - Car Stint Report)	Saleen S7-R	2009 1000 km of Okayama
Ferrari Challenge	1:30.438	Anna Inotsume	Ferrari 296 Challenge	2025 Okayama Ferrari Challenge Japan round
GT2	1:32.136	Dirk Müller (Note: 2009 1000 km of Okayama Race 2 - Stint Summary for Car 92 - Car Stint Report)	BMW M3 GT2	2009 1000 km of Okayama
Formula 4	1:32.202	Ritomo Miyata	Dome F110	2017 Okayama Japanese F4 round
Supersport	1:32.794	Keisuke Maeda	Yamaha YZF-R6	2017 Okayama All Japan Road Race Championship Supersport round
Formula Toyota	1:34.021	Tsubasa Abe	Tom's FT30	2005 1st Okayama Formula Toyota round
GT	1:34.335	Atsushi Yogou	Porsche 911 (996) GT3-R	2003 Aida JGTC round
Formula BMW	1:34.388	Facu Regalia	Mygale FB02	2009 Okayama Formula BMW Pacific round
Group A	1:36.281	Kazuyoshi Hoshino	Nissan Skyline GT-R BNR32	1993 Okayama JTCC round
GT4	1:36.582	Takeshi Suehiro	Porsche 718 Cayman GT4 RS Clubsport	2026 Okayama SRO Japan Cup round
TCR Touring Car	1:36.706	Anna Inotsume	Honda Civic Type R TCR	2023 Okayama TCR Japan round
Super Touring	1:36.807	Osamu Nakako	Honda Accord	1997 Okayama JTCC round
Super 2000	1:48.767	James Thompson	Honda Accord Euro R	2008 FIA WTCC Race of Japan
Motorcycle Circuit (2020–present): 3.747 km (2.328 mi)
Superbike	1:29.889	Yuki Okamoto	Yamaha YZF-R1	2024 Okayama All Japan Road Race Championship Superbike round
Supersport	1:35.235	Kengo Nagao	Yamaha YZF-R6	2023 Okayama All Japan Road Race Championship Supersport round
Moto3	1:39.740	Hiroki Ono	Honda NSF250R	2024 Okayama All Japan Road Race Championship J-GP3 round
