= Yu Kanamaru =

Japanese racing driver

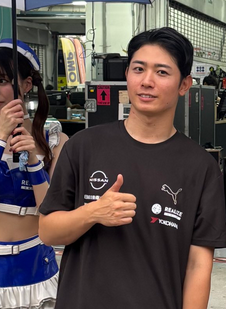
- Kanamaru at the 2025 Super GT Malaysia Festival
- Nationality: (Japan) Japanese
- Born: 13 May 1994 (age 32) Tokyo, Japan

F3 Asian Championship career
- Debut season: 2019
- Categorisation: FIA Silver
- Teams: BlackArts Racing Team
- Starts: 24
- Wins: 1
- Best finish: 6th in 2019-20

Yu Kanamaru (金丸 悠, Kanamaru Yū; born 13 May 1994 in Tokyo, Japan) is a Japanese racing driver.

== Career ==
Kanamaru's single seater career began in 2012 after graduating from karting. He took a surprise win in the Formula Renault 2.0 NEC in 2012 at the final race of the season at Spa-Francorchamps. He made his Formula Renault 3.5 debut in 2015 for Pons Racing replacing Meindert van Buuren.

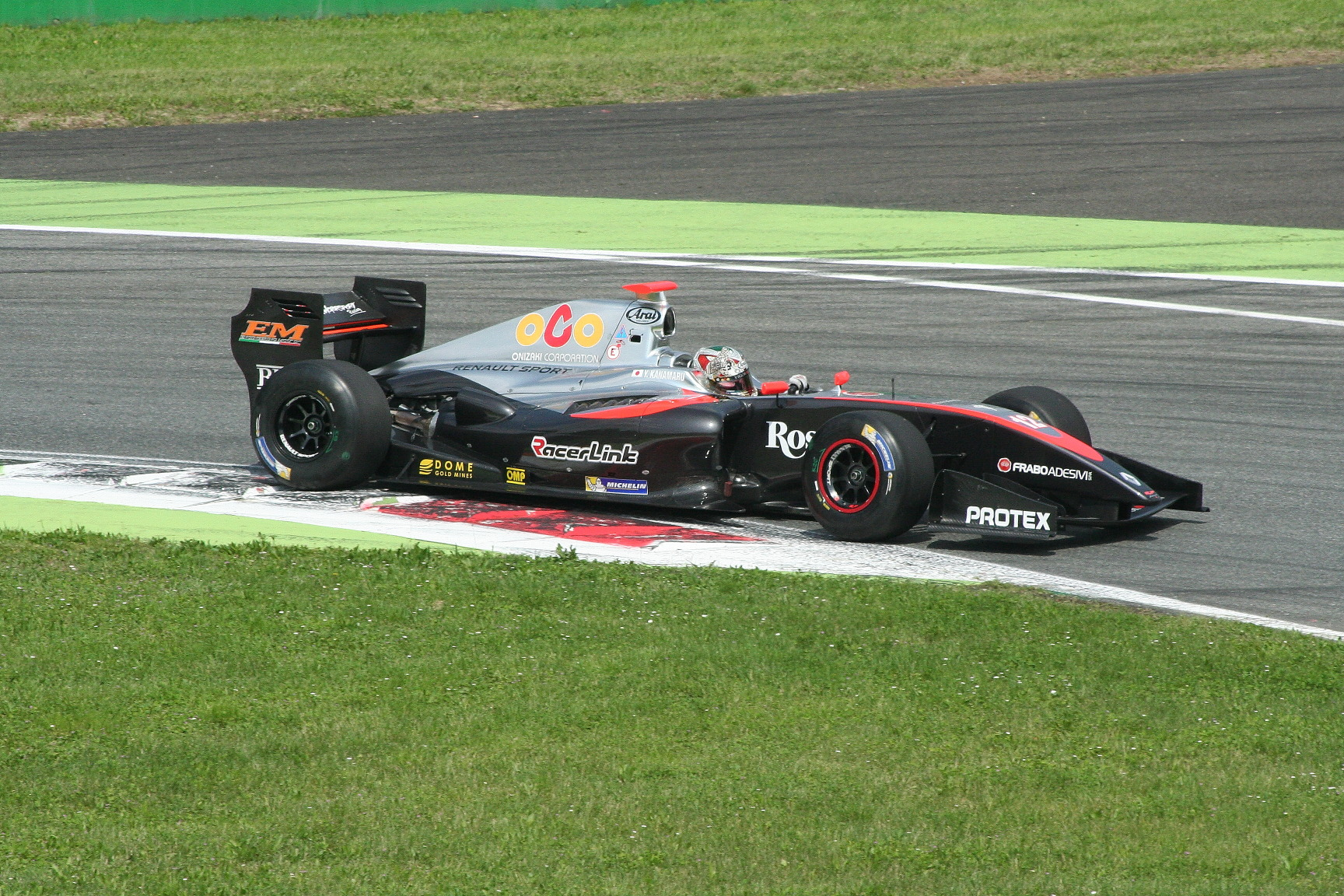
Kanamaru ar Monza 2017

Kanamaru returned to Japan in 2018 and competed in the Japanese Formula 3 Championship with the B-MAX Racing Team. Since then, he has focused his activities on Japan.

In 2020, Kanamaru signed a reserve driver contract with Honda and accompanied them in the Super Formula and Super GT GT500 classes. He participated in the GT500 class test for KEIHIN Real Racing as a substitute for Bertrand Baguette, who was unable to enter the country due to COVID-19 restrictions during the SUPER GT test before the season started.

== Racing record ==
=== Career summary ===
Season	Series	Team	Races	Wins	Poles	F/Laps	Podiums	Points	Position
2012	Formula Renault 2.0 NEC	KTR	20	1	0	0	1	97	17th
2012	Eurocup Formula Renault 2.0	KTR	14	0	0	0	0	0	39th
2013	Formula Renault 2.0 NEC	KTR	8	0	0	0	0	47	26th
2013	Eurocup Formula Renault 2.0	KTR	14	0	0	0	0	0	31st
2014	Euroformula Open Championship	Emilio de Villota Motorsport	16	0	0	2	4	128	4th
2014	Spanish Formula Three Championship	Emilio de Villota Motorsport	6	0	0	1	1	47	5th
2014	Macau Grand Prix	Carlin	1	0	0	0	0	N/A	DNF
2015	Euroformula Open Championship	Emilio de Villota Motorsport	16	1	2	1	7	206	**3rd**
2015	Spanish Formula Three Championship	Emilio de Villota Motorsport	6	0	0	1	3	88	**3rd**
2015	Macau Grand Prix	Carlin	1	0	0	0	0	N/A	DNF
2015	Formula Renault 3.5 Series	Pons Racing	6	0	0	0	0	9	18th
2016	Formula V8 3.5 Series	Teo Martín Motorsport	18	0	0	0	0	85	8th
2017	World Series Formula V8 3.5	RP Motorsport	18	0	0	1	1	115	7th
2018	Japanese Formula 3 Championship	B-MAX Racing Team	19	0	0	0	3	40	5th
2019	TCR Japan Touring Car Series - Saturday Series	Team GOH Models	5	2	1	0	3	75	**3rd**
2019	TCR Japan Touring Car Series - Sunday Series	Team GOH Models	5	2	1	0	2	77	**2nd**
2019	F3 Asian Championship	Super License	9	0	0	0	0	50	9th
2019–20	F3 Asian Championship	BlackArts Racing Team	15	1	0	0	2	104	6th
2020	Formula Regional Japanese Championship	Sutekina Racing Team	5	0	0	0	4	75	7th
2020	Super Formula	Honda Racing	Reserve Driver						
2020	Super GT - GT500	Honda Racing	Reserve Driver						
2021	Super Taikyu - ST-Z	Team 5Zigen	2	0	0	0	1	80.5‡	**3rd‡**
2022	Super Taikyu - ST-TCR	Team Noah	1	1	1	0	1	139‡	**1st‡**
2023	IMSA SportsCar Championship - LMP3	FastMD Racing	1	0	0	0	0	0	NC
2023	Super Taikyu - ST-X	Team 5Zigen	2	1	1	2	1	36‡	7th‡
2023	Super Taikyu - ST-Z	Team Noah	1	0	0	0	0	37.5‡	9th‡
2023	Formula Regional Japanese Championship	Sutekina Racing Team	3	1	0	1	3	55	9th
2024	GT World Challenge Asia	Team 5Zigen	12	1	0	?	2	44	12th
2024	Super Taikyu - ST-Z	Team Noah	6	0	0	0	1	53‡	10th
2025	GT World Challenge Asia	Team 5Zigen	12	1	0	0	1	67	11th
2025	Super GT - GT300	Kondo Racing	2	0	0	0	0	15	25th
2026	Super GT - GT300	Tomei Sports	7	0	0	0	1	29	24th
2026	Super Taikyu - ST-X	D'station Racing							

‡ Team standings

=== Complete Eurocup Formula Renault 2.0 results ===
(key) (Races in bold indicate pole position; races in italics indicate fastest lap)

Year	Entrant	1	2	3	4	5	6	7	8	9	10	11	12	13	14	DC	Points
2012	KTR	ALC; 1 Ret	ALC; 2; 29	SPA; 1; 27	SPA; 2; 32	NÜR; 1; 24	NÜR; 2; 17	MSC; 1 Ret	MSC; 2; 25	HUN; 1; 27	HUN; 2; 26	LEC; 1 Ret	LEC; 2 Ret	CAT; 1 DSQ	CAT; 2; 24	39th	0
2013	KTR	ALC; 1; 35	ALC; 2 Ret	SPA; 1; 16	SPA; 2; 22	MSC; 1; 32	MSC; 2; 28	RBR; 1; 28	RBR; 2; 23	HUN; 1; 25	HUN; 2; 19	LEC; 1; 23	LEC; 2 Ret	CAT; 1 Ret	CAT; 2; 20	31st	0

=== Complete Formula Renault 2.0 NEC results ===
(key) (Races in bold indicate pole position) (Races in italics indicate fastest lap)

Year	Entrant	1	2	3	4	5	6	7	8	9	10	11	12	13	14	15	16	17	18	19	20	DC	Points
2012	KTR	HOC; 1; 23	HOC; 2 Ret	HOC; 3 Ret	NÜR; 1 DNS	NÜR; 2; 21	OSC; 1; 10	OSC; 2; 12	OSC; 3; 20	ASS; 1; 13	ASS; 2; 17	RBR; 1; 20	RBR; 2; 15	MST; 1; 21	MST; 2; 13	MST; 3; 20	ZAN; 1 Ret	ZAN; 2; 7	ZAN; 3 Ret	SPA; 1; 17	SPA; 2; 1	17th	97
2013	KTR	HOC; 1; 15	HOC; 2 Ret	HOC; 3; 14	NÜR; 1	NÜR; 2	SIL; 1	SIL; 2	SPA; 1	SPA; 2	ASS; 1; 14	ASS; 2; 15	MST; 1; 12	MST; 2; 19	MST; 3; 11	ZAN; 1	ZAN; 2	ZAN; 3				26th	47

=== Complete World Series Formula V8 3.5 results ===
(key) (Races in bold indicate pole position) (Races in italics indicate fastest lap)

Year	Team	1	2	3	4	5	6	7	8	9	10	11	12	13	14	15	16	17	18	Pos.	Points
2015	Pons Racing	ALC; 1	ALC; 2	MON; 1	SPA; 1	SPA; 2	HUN; 1	HUN; 2	RBR; 1	RBR; 2	SIL; 1	SIL; 2	NÜR; 1; 12	NÜR; 2; 13	BUG; 1; 6	BUG; 2 Ret	JER; 1; 10	JER; 2; 11		18th	9
2016	Teo Martín Motorsport	ALC; 1 Ret	ALC; 2; 4	HUN; 1; 9	HUN; 2; 10	SPA; 1; 4	SPA; 2; 7	LEC; 1; 7	LEC; 2; 11	SIL; 1; 7	SIL; 2; 9	RBR; 1; 7	RBR; 2 Ret	MNZ; 1; 6	MNZ; 2; 5	JER; 1; 6	JER; 2; 10	CAT; 1; 8	CAT; 2; 10	8th	85
2017	RP Motorsport	SIL; 1; 10	SIL; 2 Ret	SPA; 1; 5	SPA; 2; 8	MNZ; 1 Ret	MNZ; 2; 3	JER; 1; 7	JER; 2; 10	ALC; 1; 7	ALC; 2; 4	NÜR; 1; 5	NÜR; 2; 7	MEX; 1; 7	MEX; 2; 7	COA; 1; 7	COA; 2; 7	BHR; 1; 4	BHR; 2; 6	7th	115

=== Complete F3 Asian Championship results ===
(key) (Races in bold indicate pole position; races in italics indicate fastest lap)

Year	Entrant	1	2	3	4	5	6	7	8	9	10	11	12	13	14	15	Pos	Points
2019	Super License	SEP; 1; 8	SEP; 2; 6	SEP; 3; 8	CHA; 1; 7	CHA; 2; 9	CHA; 3; 7	SUZ; 1	SUZ; 2	SUZ; 3	SIC1; 1 Ret	SIC1; 2; 4	SIC1; 3; 6	SIC2; 1	SIC2; 2	SIC2; 3	9th	50
2019–20	BlackArts Racing Team	SEP1; 1; 6	SEP1; 2; 5	SEP1; 3 Ret	DUB; 1; 9	DUB; 2; 10	DUB; 3; 1	ABU; 1 Ret	ABU; 2; 11	ABU; 3 Ret	SEP2; 1; 6	SEP2; 2; 6	SEP2; 3; 3	CHA; 1; 10	CHA; 2; 6	CHA; 3; 5	6th	104

=== Complete IMSA SportsCar Championship results ===
(key) (Races in bold indicate pole position; races in italics indicate fastest lap)

Year	Entrant	Class	Make	Engine	1	2	3	4	5	6	7	Rank	Points
2023	FastMD Racing	LMP3	Duqueine M30 - D08	Nissan VK56DE 5.6 L V8	DAY; 6†	SEB	WGL	MOS	ELK	IMS	PET	NC†	0†

^{†} Points only counted towards the Michelin Endurance Cup, and not the overall LMP3 Championship.

=== Complete Super GT results ===
Year	Team	Car	Class	1	2	3	4	5	6	7	8	9	DC	Points
2025	Kondo Racing	Nissan GT-R Nismo GT3	GT300	OKA	FUJ; 7	SEP; 10	FS1	FS2	SUZ	SUG	AUT	MOT	25th	15
2026	Tomei Sports	Nissan GT-R Nismo GT3	GT300	OKA; 26	FUJ; 19	FUJ	SUZ; 7	SUG; 18	AUT; 2	MOT; 17	MOT; 18		24th	29
