= 2019 TCR Japan Touring Car Series =

The 2019 TCR Japan Touring Car Series season was the first season of the TCR Japan Touring Car Series. The series supported the 2019 Super Formula Championship.

== Teams and drivers ==
Yokohama was the official tyre supplier.

| Team | Car | No. | Drivers | Class | Rounds |
|---|---|---|---|---|---|
| (Japan) Team GOH Models | Honda Civic Type R TCR (FK8) | 5 | (Japan) Yu Kanamaru | | All |
| (Japan) Nilzz Racing | Audi RS 3 LMS TCR | 7 | (Japan) Jun Makino | G | All |
| (Japan) Adenau | Volkswagen Golf GTI TCR | 10 | (Japan) Jun Sato | G | All |
| (Japan) Adenau | Volkswagen Golf GTI TCR | 30 | (France) Philippe Devesa | G | 5 |
| (Hong Kong) KCMG | Honda Civic Type R TCR (FK8) | 18 | (United Kingdom) Matthew Howson | | All |
| (Hong Kong) KCMG | Honda Civic Type R TCR (FK8) | 22 | (Hong Kong) Paul Ip | G | 3–5 |
| (Hong Kong) KCMG | Honda Civic Type R TCR (FK8) | 72 | (Japan) Yukinori Taniguchi | G | All |
| (Japan) / Birth Racing Project HITMAN ANDARE (Note: Car No. 19 entered as Birth Racing Project HITMAN ANDARE while car No. 190 is entered as Birth Racing Project RN Sport Audi Mie.); (Japan) / Birth Racing Project RN Sport Audi Mie | Volkswagen Golf GTI TCR | 19 | (Japan) 'Hirobon' | G | All |
| (Japan) / Birth Racing Project HITMAN ANDARE; (Japan) / Birth Racing Project RN Sport Audi Mie | Audi RS 3 LMS TCR | 190 | (Japan) Masayuki Ueda | G | All |
| (Japan) Hitotsuyama Racing | Audi RS 3 LMS TCR | 21 | (Japan) Takuro Shinohara | | 1–4 |
| (Japan) Hitotsuyama Racing | Audi RS 3 LMS TCR | 101 | (Japan) Hideki Nakahara | G | 3 |
| (Japan) PURPLE RACING | Audi RS 3 LMS TCR | 23 | (Japan) 'Yoshiki' | G | All |
| (Japan) PURPLE RACING | Audi RS 3 LMS TCR | 24 | (Japan) 'Kenji' | G | All |
| (Japan) Volkswagen Wakayama Chuo RT with TEAM Wakayama | Volkswagen Golf GTI TCR | 25 | (Japan) Takeshi Matsumoto | | All |
| (Japan) GO&FUN-SquadraCorse | Alfa Romeo Giulietta TCR | 33 | (Japan) Shuji Maejima | G | All |
| (Japan) Saitama Toyopet Green Brave | Volkswagen Golf GTI TCR | 52 | (Japan) Shogo Mitsuyama | | All |
| (Japan) 55 MOTO RACING | Alfa Romeo Giulietta TCR | 55 | (Japan) 'Mototino' | G | All |
| (Japan) TEAM G/MOTION | Honda Civic Type R TCR (FK8) | 62 | (Japan) Resshu Shioya | G | All |

| Icon | Class |
|---|---|
| G | Gentleman Driver |

== Race calendar and results ==
The calendar was announced on 27 October 2018 with 5 confirmed dates with all rounds held in Japan and supporting the Super Formula Championship.

| Round | | Circuit | Date | Pole position | Fastest lap | Winning driver | Winning team | Gentleman winner |
|---|---|---|---|---|---|---|---|---|
| 1 | 1 | Autopolis | 18 May | (United Kingdom) Matt Howson | (United Kingdom) Matt Howson | (United Kingdom) Matt Howson | (Hong Kong) KCMG | (Japan) Yukinori Taniguchi |
| 1 | 2 | Autopolis | 19 May | (Japan) Takuro Shinohara | (Japan) 'Hirobon' | (Japan) Yu Kanamaru | (Japan) Team GOH Models | (Japan) Resshu Shioya |
| 2 | 3 | Sportsland Sugo | 22 June | (Japan) Takuro Shinohara | (Japan) Takuro Shinohara | (Japan) Shogo Mitsuyama | (Japan) Saitama Toyopet Green Brave | (Japan) Yukinori Taniguchi |
| 2 | 4 | Sportsland Sugo | 23 June | (Japan) Takuro Shinohara | (Japan) Shuji Maejima | (Japan) Shuji Maejima | (Japan) GO&FUN-SquadraCorse | (Japan) Shuji Maejima |
| 3 | 5 | Fuji Speedway | 12 July | (Japan) Takuro Shinohara | (Japan) Takeshi Matsumoto | (Japan) Yu Kanamaru | (Japan) Team GOH Models | (Japan) Shuji Maejima |
| 3 | 6 | Fuji Speedway | 13 July | (Japan) Yu Kanamaru | (Japan) Yu Kanamaru | (Japan) Yu Kanamaru | (Japan) Team GOH Models | (Japan) Shuji Maejima |
| 4 | 7 | Okayama International Circuit | 28 September | (Japan) Takuro Shinohara | (Japan) Takuro Shinohara | (Japan) Takuro Shinohara | (Japan) Hitotsuyama Racing | (Japan) 'Hirobon' |
| 4 | 8 | Okayama International Circuit | 29 September | (Japan) Takuro Shinohara | (Japan) Takuro Shinohara | (Japan) Takuro Shinohara | (Japan) Hitotsuyama Racing | (Japan) Shuji Maejima |
| 5 | 9 | Suzuka Circuit | 26 October | (Japan) Yu Kanamaru | (Japan) 'Hirobon' | (Japan) Yu Kanamaru | (Japan) Team GOH Models | (Japan) Shuji Maejima |
| 5 | 10 | Suzuka Circuit | 27 October | (Japan) Takeshi Matsumoto | (Japan) Shuji Maejima | (United Kingdom) Matt Howson | (Hong Kong) KCMG | (Japan) 'Hirobon' |

== Championship standings ==
Scoring systems

| Position | 1st | 2nd | 3rd | 4th | 5th | 6th | 7th | 8th | 9th | 10th |
|---|---|---|---|---|---|---|---|---|---|---|
| Points | 25 | 18 | 15 | 12 | 10 | 8 | 6 | 4 | 2 | 1 |

=== TCR Japan Series ===
TCR Japan Saturday Series
| Pos. | Driver | ATP | SUG | FUJ | OKA | SUZ | Pts. |
|---|---|---|---|---|---|---|---|
| 1 | (United Kingdom) Matt Howson | **1**^{1} | 3^{5} | 6^{4} | 6^{4} | 2^{2} | 88 |
| 2 | (Japan) Takuro Shinohara | 2^{2} | **2**^{1} | **9**^{1} | **1**^{1} | | 82 |
| 3 | (Japan) Yu Kanamaru | 3^{3} | 14 | 1^{5} | DSQ^{5} | **1**^{1} | 75 |
| 4 | (Japan) Takeshi Matsumoto | 5^{5} | 4^{4} | 2 | 2 | 13^{3} | 64 |
| 5 | (Japan) Shogo Mitsuyama | 4^{4} | 1^{3} | 5^{3} | 12^{3} | 14 | 58 |
| 6 | (Japan) Shuji Maejima | DNS | 7^{2} | 3^{2} | 7^{2} | 3^{4} | 56 |
| 7 | (Japan) 'Hirobon' | 8 | 6 | 4 | 3 | 4 | 51 |
| 8 | (Japan) Yukinori Taniguchi | 6 | 5 | 7 | 4 | 6 | 44 |
| 9 | (Japan) Resshu Shioya | 10 | 8 | Ret | 5 | 5 | 25 |
| 10 | (Japan) 'Yoshiki' | 7 | 9 | 11 | 8 | 7 | 18 |
| 11 | (Hong Kong) Paul Ip | | | 8 | 13 | 10^{5} | 6 |
| 12 | (France) Philippe Devesa | | | | | 8 | 4 |
| 13 | (Japan) Masayuki Ueda | 9 | 10 | 12 | 10 | 15 | 4 |
| 14 | (Japan) 'Mototino' | 11 | 12 | 14 | 9 | 11 | 2 |
| 15 | (Japan) Jun Sato | 12 | 15 | 13 | 15 | 9 | 2 |
| 16 | (Japan) 'Kenji' | 13 | 11 | 10 | 11 | 16 | 1 |
| 17 | (Japan) Jun Makino | 14 | 13 | 15 | 14 | 12 | 0 |
| 18 | (Japan) Hideki Nakahara | | | 16 | | | 0 |
| Pos. | Driver | ATP | SUG | FUJ | OKA | SUZ | Pts. |

TCR Japan Sunday Series
| Pos. | Driver | ATP | SUG | FUJ | OKA | SUZ | Pts. |
|---|---|---|---|---|---|---|---|
| 1 | (Japan) Takeshi Matsumoto | 3 | 2^{5} | 3^{2} | 4^{5} | **2**^{1} | 89 |
| 2 | (Japan) Yu Kanamaru | 1^{3} | Ret^{4} | **1**^{1} | 5^{4} | 9^{3} | 77 |
| 3 | (Japan) Shuji Maejima | 8 | 1^{2} | 2^{5} | 2^{2} | 11 | 75 |
| 4 | (United Kingdom) Matt Howson | 2^{2} | 9^{3} | Ret^{3} | 6 | 1 | 67 |
| 5 | (Japan) Shogo Mitsuyama | 4 | 3 | 4^{4} | 3^{3} | 6 | 67 |
| 6 | (Japan) 'Hirobon' | 6^{5} | 4 | 5 | 13 | 3^{4} | 48 |
| 7 | (Japan) Takuro Shinohara | **Ret**^{1} | **Ret**^{1} | 7 | **1**^{1} | | 46 |
| 8 | (Japan) Resshu Shioya | 5^{4} | 11 | 15 | 11 | 4 | 24 |
| 9 | (Japan) 'Yoshiki' | 9 | 5 | 8 | 8 | Ret | 20 |
| 10 | (Japan) 'Kenji' | 10 | 6 | 11 | 12 | 8 | 13 |
| 11 | (Japan) Yukinori Taniguchi | 7 | 13† | 12 | 7 | Ret | 12 |
| 12 | (France) Philippe Devesa | | | | | 5 | 1 |
| 13 | (Japan) Masayuki Ueda | 11 | 10 | 10 | 9 | 7 | 10 |
| 14 | (Hong Kong) Paul Ip | | | 6 | 14 | 13 | 8 |
| 15 | (Japan) Jun Sato | 12 | 7 | 9 | 15 | Ret | 8 |
| 16 | (Japan) 'Mototino' | 13 | 8 | 14 | 10 | 10 | 6 |
| 17 | (Japan) Jun Makino | 14 | 12 | 13 | 16 | 12 | 0 |
| 18 | (Japan) Hideki Nakahra | | | 16 | | | 0 |
| Pos. | Driver | ATP | SUG | FUJ | OKA | SUZ | Pts. |

| Colour | Result |
|---|---|
| Gold | Winner |
| Silver | Second place |
| Bronze | Third place |
| Green | Points classification |
| Blue | Non-points classification |
| Blue | Non-classified finish (NC) |
| Purple | Retired, not classified (Ret) |
| Red | Did not qualify (DNQ) |
| Red | Did not pre-qualify (DNPQ) |
| Black | Disqualified (DSQ) |
| White | Did not start (DNS) |
| White | Withdrew (WD) |
| White | Race cancelled (C) |
| Blank | Did not practice (DNP) |
| Blank | Did not arrive (DNA) |
| Blank | Excluded (EX) |

**Bold** – Pole
Italics – Fastest Lap

† – Drivers did not finish the race, but were classified as they completed over 75% of the race distance.

=== Gentleman championship ===
TCR Japan Saturday Series
| Pos. | Driver | ATP | SUG | FUJ | OKA | SUZ | Pts. |
|---|---|---|---|---|---|---|---|
| 1 | (Japan) Yukinori Taniguchi | 6 | 5 | 7 | 4 | 6^{3} | 111 |
| 2 | (Japan) 'Hirobon' | 8 | 6 | 4 | 3 | 4^{4} | 104 |
| 3 | (Japan) Shuji Maejima | DNS | 7^{2} | 3^{2} | 7^{2} | 3^{1} | 98 |
| 4 | (Japan) 'Yoshiki' | 7 | 9 | 11 | 8 | 7 | 65 |
| 5 | (Japan) Resshu Shioya | 10 | 8 | Ret | 5 | 5^{5} | 61 |
| 6 | (Japan) Masayuki Ueda | 9 | 10 | 12 | 10 | 1 | 32 |
| 7 | (Japan) 'Kenji' | 13 | 11 | 10 | 11 | 16 | 30 |
| 8 | (Japan) 'Mototino' | 11 | 12 | 14 | 9 | 11 | 24 |
| 9 | (Hong Kong) Paul Ip | | | 8 | 13 | 10^{2} | 22 |
| 10 | (Japan) Jun Sato | 12 | 15 | 13 | 15 | 9 | 17 |
| 11 | (France) Philippe Devesa | | | | | 8 | 8 |
| 12 | (Japan) Jun Makino | 14 | 13 | 15 | 14 | 12 | 7 |
| 13 | (Japan) Hideki Nakahara | | | 16 | | | 0 |
| Pos. | Driver | ATP | SUG | FUJ | OKA | SUZ | Pts. |

TCR Japan Sunday Series
| Pos. | Driver | ATP | SUG | FUJ | OKA | SUZ | Pts. |
|---|---|---|---|---|---|---|---|
| 1 | (Japan) Shuji Maejima | 8 | 1^{2} | 2^{5} | 2^{2} | 11 | 114 |
| 2 | (Japan) 'Hirobon' | 6^{5} | 4 | 5 | 13 | 3^{4} | 102 |
| 3 | (Japan) Resshu Shioya | 5^{4} | 11 | 15 | 11 | 4 | 63 |
| 4 | (Japan) 'Yoshiki' | 9 | 5 | 8 | 8 | Ret | 58 |
| 5 | (Japan) Yukinori Taniguchi | 7 | 13† | 12 | 7 | Ret | 53 |
| 6 | (Japan) Masayuki Ueda | 11 | 10 | 10 | 9 | 7 | 48 |
| 7 | (Japan) 'Kenji' | 10 | 6 | 11 | 12 | 8 | 43 |
| 8 | (Japan) 'Mototino' | 13 | 8 | 14 | 10 | 10 | 29 |
| 9 | (Japan) Jun Sato | 12 | 7 | 9 | 15 | Ret | 26 |
| 10 | (Hong Kong) Paul Ip | | | 6 | 14 | 13 | 20 |
| 11 | (France) Philippe Devesa | | | | | 5 | 15 |
| 12 | (Japan) Jun Makino | 14 | 12 | 13 | 16 | 12 | 9 |
| 13 | (Japan) Hideki Nakahra | | | 16 | | | 0 |
| Pos. | Driver | ATP | SUG | FUJ | OKA | SUZ | Pts. |

| Colour | Result |
|---|---|
| Gold | Winner |
| Silver | Second place |
| Bronze | Third place |
| Green | Points classification |
| Blue | Non-points classification |
| Blue | Non-classified finish (NC) |
| Purple | Retired, not classified (Ret) |
| Red | Did not qualify (DNQ) |
| Red | Did not pre-qualify (DNPQ) |
| Black | Disqualified (DSQ) |
| White | Did not start (DNS) |
| White | Withdrew (WD) |
| White | Race cancelled (C) |
| Blank | Did not practice (DNP) |
| Blank | Did not arrive (DNA) |
| Blank | Excluded (EX) |

**Bold** – Pole
Italics – Fastest Lap

=== Entrants championship ===
| Pos. | Entrant | No. | ATP | | SUG | | FUJ | | OKA | | SUZ | | Pts. |
|---|---|---|---|---|---|---|---|---|---|---|---|---|---|
| 1 | (Hong Kong) KCMG | 18 | **1**^{1} | 2^{2} | 3^{5} | 9^{3} | 6^{4} | Ret^{3} | 6^{4} | 6 | 2^{4} | 1 | 155 |
| 4 | (Japan) Volkswagen Wakayama Chuo RT with TEAM Wakayama | 25 | 5^{5} | 3 | 4^{4} | 2^{5} | 2 | 3^{2} | 2 | 4^{5} | 13^{3} | **2**^{1} | 153 |
| 3 | (Japan) Team GOH Models | 5 | 3^{3} | 1^{3} | 14 | Ret^{4} | 1^{5} | **1**^{1} | DSQ^{5} | 5^{4} | **1**^{1} | 9^{3} | 152 |
| 6 | (Japan) GO&FUN-SquadraCorse | 33 | DNS | 8 | 7^{2} | 1^{2} | 3^{2} | 2^{5} | 7^{2} | 2^{2} | 3^{4} | 11 | 131 |
| 2 | (Japan) Hitotsuyama Racing | 21 | 2^{2} | **Ret**^{1} | **2**^{1} | **Ret**^{1} | **9**^{1} | 7 | **1**^{1} | **1**^{1} | | | 128 |
| 5 | (Japan) Saitama Toyopet Green Brave | 52 | 4^{4} | 4 | 1^{3} | 3 | 5^{3} | 4^{4} | 12^{3} | 3^{3} | 14 | 6 | 125 |
| 7 | (Japan) Birth Racing Project HITMAN ANDARE | 19 | 8 | 6^{5} | 6 | 4 | 4 | 5 | 3 | 13 | 4 | 3^{4} | 99 |
| 8 | (Hong Kong) KCMG | 72 | 6 | 7 | 5 | 13† | 7 | 12 | 4 | 7 | 6 | Ret | 56 |
| 9 | (Japan) TEAM G/MOTION | 62 | 10 | 5^{4} | 8 | 11 | Ret | 15 | 5 | 11 | 5 | 4 | 49 |
| 10 | (Japan) PURPLE RACING | 23 | 7 | 9 | 9 | 5 | 11 | 8 | 8 | 8 | 7 | Ret | 38 |
| 12 | (Japan) Adenau | 30 | | | | | | | | | 8 | 5 | 14 |
| 16 | (Japan) PURPLE RACING | 24 | 13 | 10 | 11 | 6 | 10 | 11 | 11 | 12 | 16 | 8 | 14 |
| 11 | (Hong Kong) KCMG | 22 | | | | | 8 | 6 | 13 | 14 | 10^{5} | 13 | 14 |
| 13 | (Japan) Birth Racing Project RN Sport Audi Mie | 190 | 9 | 11 | 10 | 10 | 12 | 10 | 10 | 9 | 15 | 7 | 14 |
| 15 | (Japan) Adenau | 10 | 12 | 12 | 15 | 7 | 13 | 9 | 15 | 15 | 9 | Ret | 10 |
| 14 | (Japan) 55 MOTO RACING | 55 | 11 | 13 | 12 | 8 | 14 | 14 | 9 | 10 | 11 | 10 | 8 |
| 17 | (Japan) Nilzz Racing | 7 | 14 | 14 | 13 | 12 | 15 | 13 | 14 | 16 | 12 | 12 | 0 |
| 18 | (Japan) Hitotsuyama Racing | 101 | | | | | 16 | 16 | | | | | 0 |
| Pos. | Driver | No. | ATP | | SUG | | FUJ | | OKA | | SUZ | | Pts. |

| Colour | Result |
|---|---|
| Gold | Winner |
| Silver | Second place |
| Bronze | Third place |
| Green | Points classification |
| Blue | Non-points classification |
| Blue | Non-classified finish (NC) |
| Purple | Retired, not classified (Ret) |
| Red | Did not qualify (DNQ) |
| Red | Did not pre-qualify (DNPQ) |
| Black | Disqualified (DSQ) |
| White | Did not start (DNS) |
| White | Withdrew (WD) |
| White | Race cancelled (C) |
| Blank | Did not practice (DNP) |
| Blank | Did not arrive (DNA) |
| Blank | Excluded (EX) |

**Bold** – Pole
Italics – Fastest Lap
