= 2023 24 Hours of Daytona =

61st 24 Hours of Daytona race

Previous: 2022	Next: 2024
Index: Races | Winners

Map of the Daytona International Speedway combined road course

The 2023 24 Hours of Daytona (formally the 2023 Rolex 24 at Daytona) was an endurance sports car race sanctioned by the International Motor Sports Association (IMSA). The event was held at Daytona International Speedway combined road course in Daytona Beach, Florida, on January 28–29, 2023. This event was the 61st running of the 24 Hours of Daytona since its inception in 1962, and the first of 11 races across multiple classes in the 2023 IMSA SportsCar Championship, as well as the first of four rounds in the 2023 Michelin Endurance Cup. The No. 60 Meyer Shank Racing Acura, driven by Tom Blomqvist, Colin Braun, Hélio Castroneves and Simon Pagenaud, took the overall win, but the team was later penalized for tire pressure data manipulation, resulting in penalties, fines and probation for those responsible. This was Meyer Shank's second Rolex 24 win in a row, and their third major endurance race win in four events. The No. 10 Wayne Taylor Racing Acura finished second overall and scored the most points towards the GTP championship.

== Background ==
Daytona International Speedway, where the race was held

NASCAR founder Bill France Sr., who built Daytona International Speedway in 1959, conceived of the 24 Hours of Daytona to attract European sports-car endurance racing to the United States and provide international exposure to the speedway. It is informally considered part of the Triple Crown of Endurance Racing, with the 12 Hours of Sebring and the 24 Hours of Le Mans.

International Motor Sports Association's (IMSA) president John Doonan confirmed the race was part of the schedule for the 2023 IMSA SportsCar Championship (IMSA SCC) in August 2022. It was the tenth consecutive year it was part of the IMSA SCC, and 61st 24 Hours of Daytona. The 24 Hours of Daytona was the first of eleven scheduled sports car endurance races of 2023 by IMSA, and the first of four races of the Michelin Endurance Cup (MEC). It took place at the 12-turn, 3.56-mile (5.73 km) Daytona International Speedway in Daytona Beach, Florida from January 28 to 29.

== Entry list ==
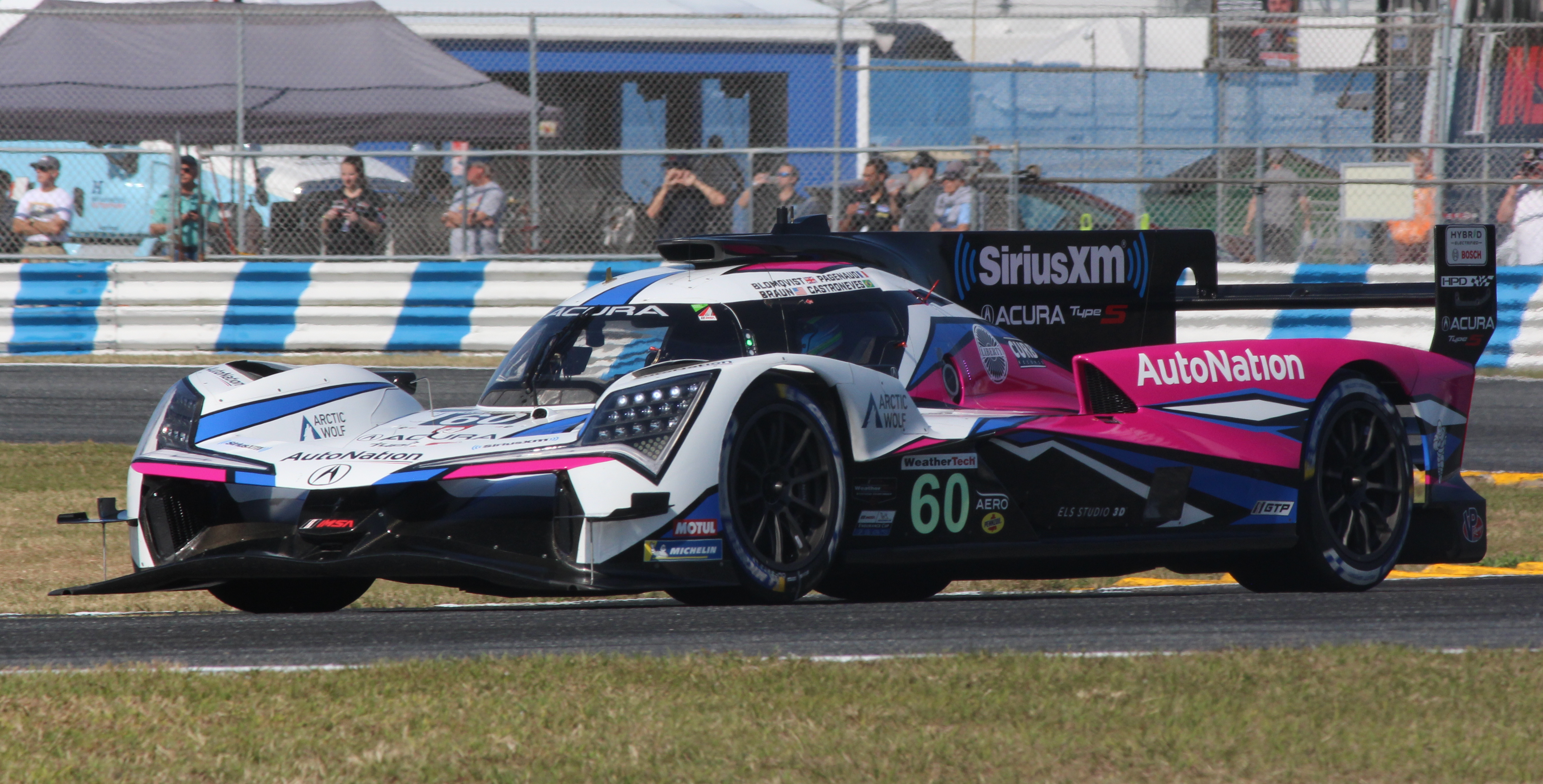
Meyer Shank Racing, the 2022 winners, returned in the new GTP class with the Acura ARX-06.

The list of entries for the 24-hour race consisted of 61 cars across five classes, equaling the number from the previous year's race. There were nine entries in Grand Touring Prototype (GTP), 10 entries in Le Mans Prototype 2 (LMP2), nine entries in LMP3, and 33 entries across both GT Daytona classes, with nine entered in GTD Pro and 24 entered in GTD.

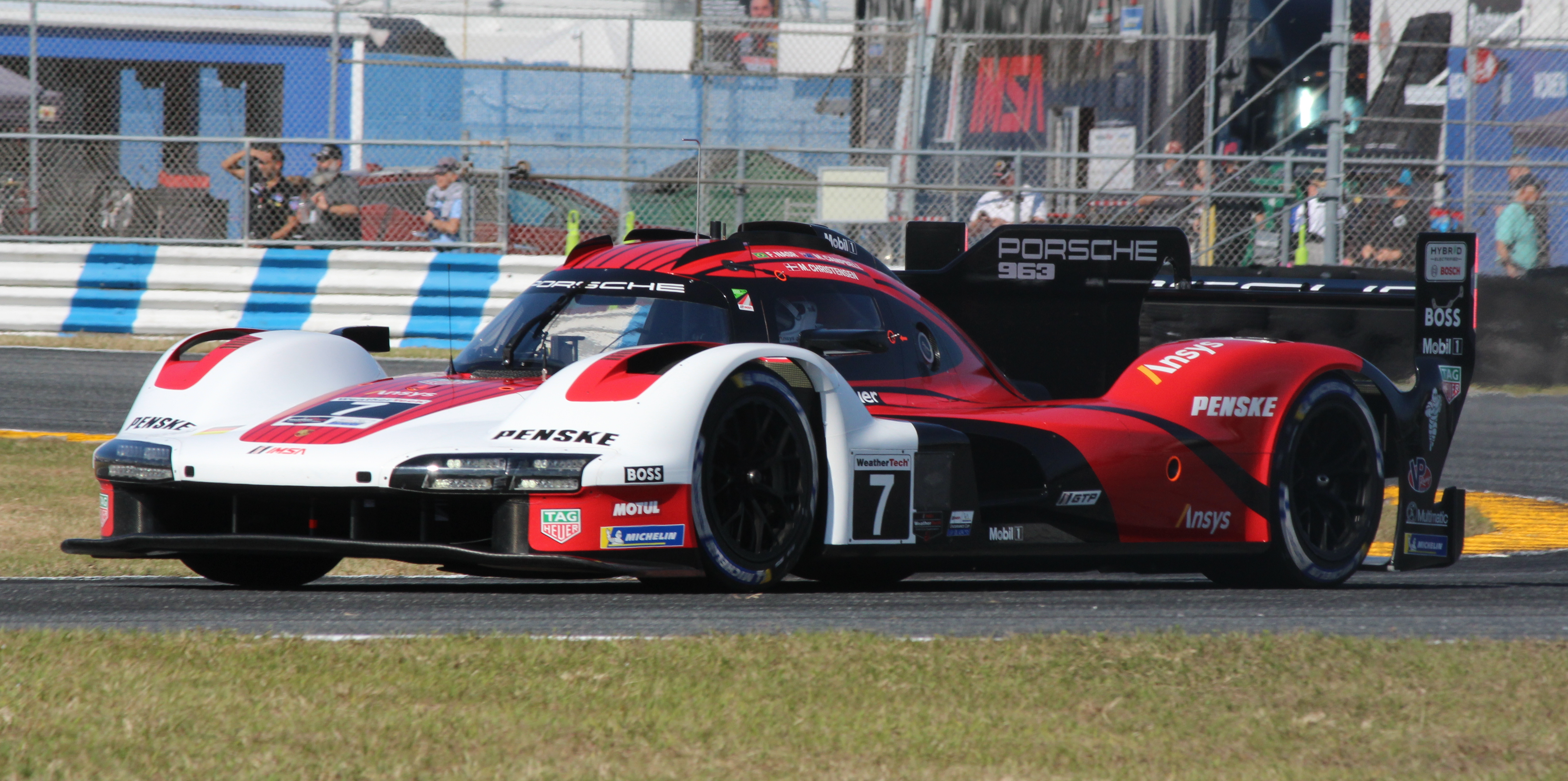
The Porsche 963 was one of the LMDh cars debuting in the 2023 24 hour race.

The 2023 24 Hours of Daytona saw the competition debut of LMDh regulations - run as Grand Touring Prototype - as the top class of the series, replacing the previous Daytona Prototype International regulations. Four manufacturers entered the class for its inaugural race. Acura and Cadillac, both present during the DPi era, continued their prototype programs by joining LMDh. Acura, with their ARX-06, entered two cars, one operated by Wayne Taylor Racing with Andretti Autosport, and the other by Meyer Shank Racing with Curb-Agajanian. Cadillac, with their V-LMDh, entered three cars, two for Chip Ganassi Racing (operating as Cadillac Racing), and one for Whelen Engineering Racing. Also joining the LMDh class are Porsche and BMW. Porsche, entering with their 963, partnered with Team Penske to enter two cars into the race. BMW, entered with the M Hybrid V8, promoted their longtime GT racing partners Rahal Letterman Lanigan Racing to running their LMDh program.

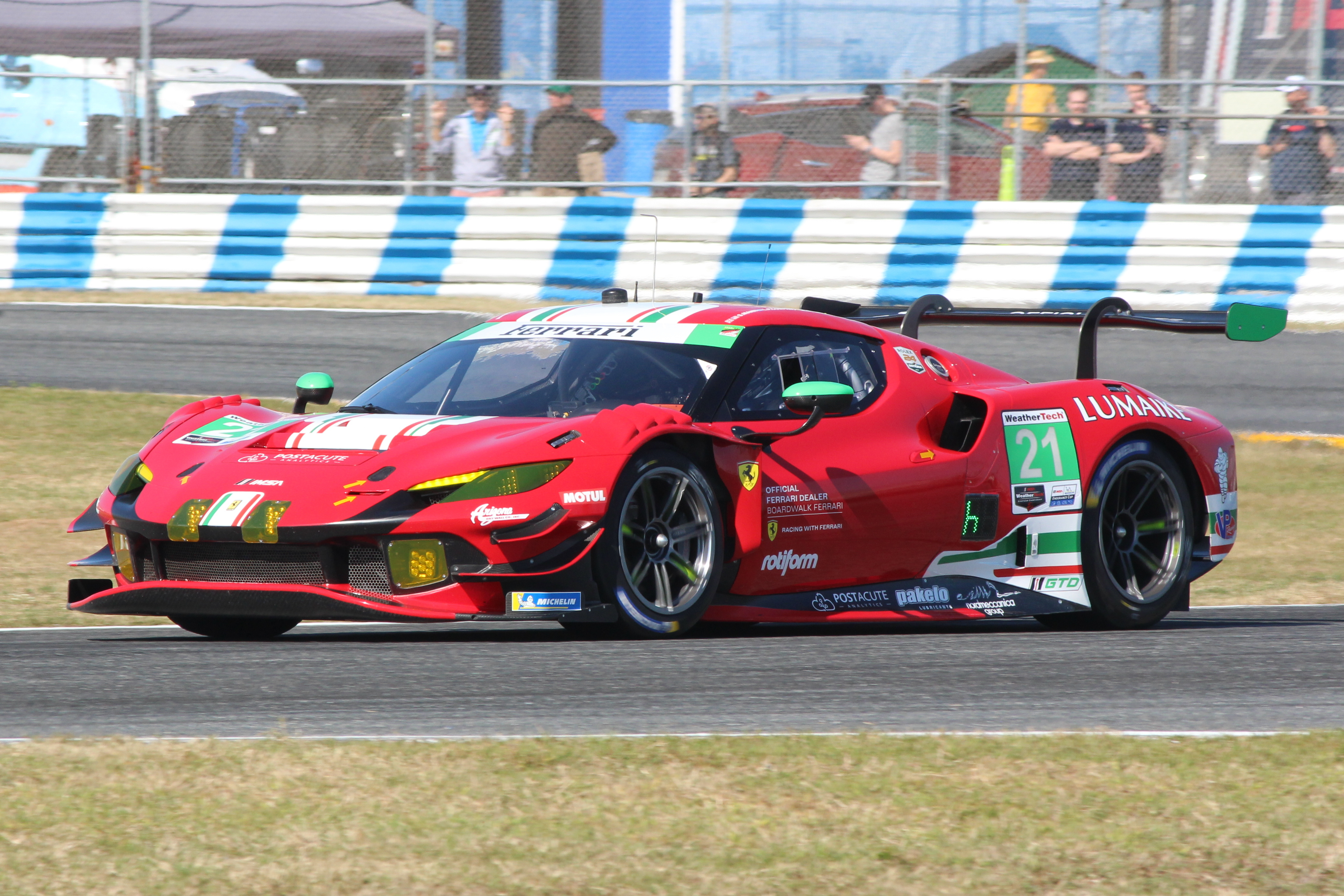
The Ferrari 296 GT3 was one of the GT3 cars debuting in the 2023 24 hour race.

In the GTD classes, both Porsche and Ferrari had new GT3 spec cars making their debut. Porsche entered with several of the 992 version of the 911 GT3, including with defending GTD Pro champion Pfaff Motorsports and defending GTD race winners Wright Motorsports. Ferrari's 296 GT3 made its competition debut as well, with entered teams including longtime Ferrari customers AF Corse and Risi Competizione.

== Roar Before the 24 ==
The qualifying race at the Roar as held in 2021 and 2022 has been removed from the format for 2023.

Daytona 24 relevant activity at the Roar weekend includes load-in, media day, scrutineering, and five (5) practice sessions.

The Roar Before the 24 Tests occurred from January 20 to 22, 2023, with all cars participating in the test.

== Practice ==
Five practice sessions preceded the race's start on Saturday: three on Thursday and two on Friday. The first 90-minute session was on Thursday morning while the second session in the afternoon lasted 100 minutes. The third, that evening, lasted 100 minutes; the fourth, on Friday morning, lasted an hour. The fifth session on Friday evening lasted 20 minutes.

The No. 10 Acura of Filipe Albuquerque set the fastest time in opening practice with a time of 1:35.366, 0.266 seconds faster than Earl Bamber's No. 02 Cadillac. Paul-Loup Chatin's No. 52 PR1/Mathiasen Motorsports car led LMP2 with a lap of 1:38.302, followed by Oliver Jarvis's No. 18 Era Motorsport car. Felipe Fraga in the No. 74 Riley Motorsports Ligier led LMP3 with a time of 1:42.704. Owen Trinkler was fastest in GTD Pro while Lucas Auer set the fastest time amongst all GTD cars. Auer crashed in turn two head on into the inside wall. He was extracted from his No. 57 Winward Racing car and suffered lumbar injuries. As a result of his injuries, Lucas Auer was forced to miss the rest of the event and Daniel Morad filled in for him.

In the second practice session, Richard Westbrook in the No. 02 Cadillac set the fastest lap with a time of 1:35.185, ahead of the No. 10 Acura of Louis Delétraz. Nicolas Lapierre led LMP2 with a time of 1:38.615. Felipe Fraga was fastest in LMP3 with a time of 1:42.491. Jules Gounon was fastest in GTD Pro while Mikaël Grenier set the fastest time amongst all GTD cars.

The third practice session saw Matt Campbell lap quickest for Porsche Penske Motorsport with a time of 1:35.802, 0.172 seconds ahead of Albuquerque. Cadillac Racing were third and fourth after laps from Alex Lynn and Sébastien Bourdais. Matthieu Vaxivière was fastest in LMP2 in the No. 88 AF Corse car with a time of 1:38.416. The No. 36 Andretti Autosport Ligier of Rasmus Lindh was fastest in LMP3 with a time of 1:42.559. The GTD Pro class was topped by the #79 Mercedes of Maro Engel while Mikaël Grenier was fastest in GTD.

Alexander Sims led the fourth practice session for Whelen Engineering Racing with a time of 1:35.493. Scott Dixon's No. 01 Cadillac was second fastest followed by Nick Yelloly in the No. 25 BMW. Mikkel Jensen led LMP2 with a time of 1:38.052. Jarett Andretti was fastest in LMP3 with a time of 1:43.191. Jules Gounon was fastest in GTD Pro while Mikaël Grenier set the fastest time amongst all GTD cars.

In the final practice session, Renger van der Zande was fastest for Cadillac Racing with a time of 1:36.742. Alex Lynn was second fastest followed by Connor De Phillippi in the No. 25 BMW. The session only saw the GTP cars participate.

== Qualifying ==
Qualifying was held on Sunday, January 22. Due to heavy rainfall during the previous night's practice sessions and software changes made by IMSA, cars in the GTP class were given an extra 15-minute session prior to the start of qualifying.

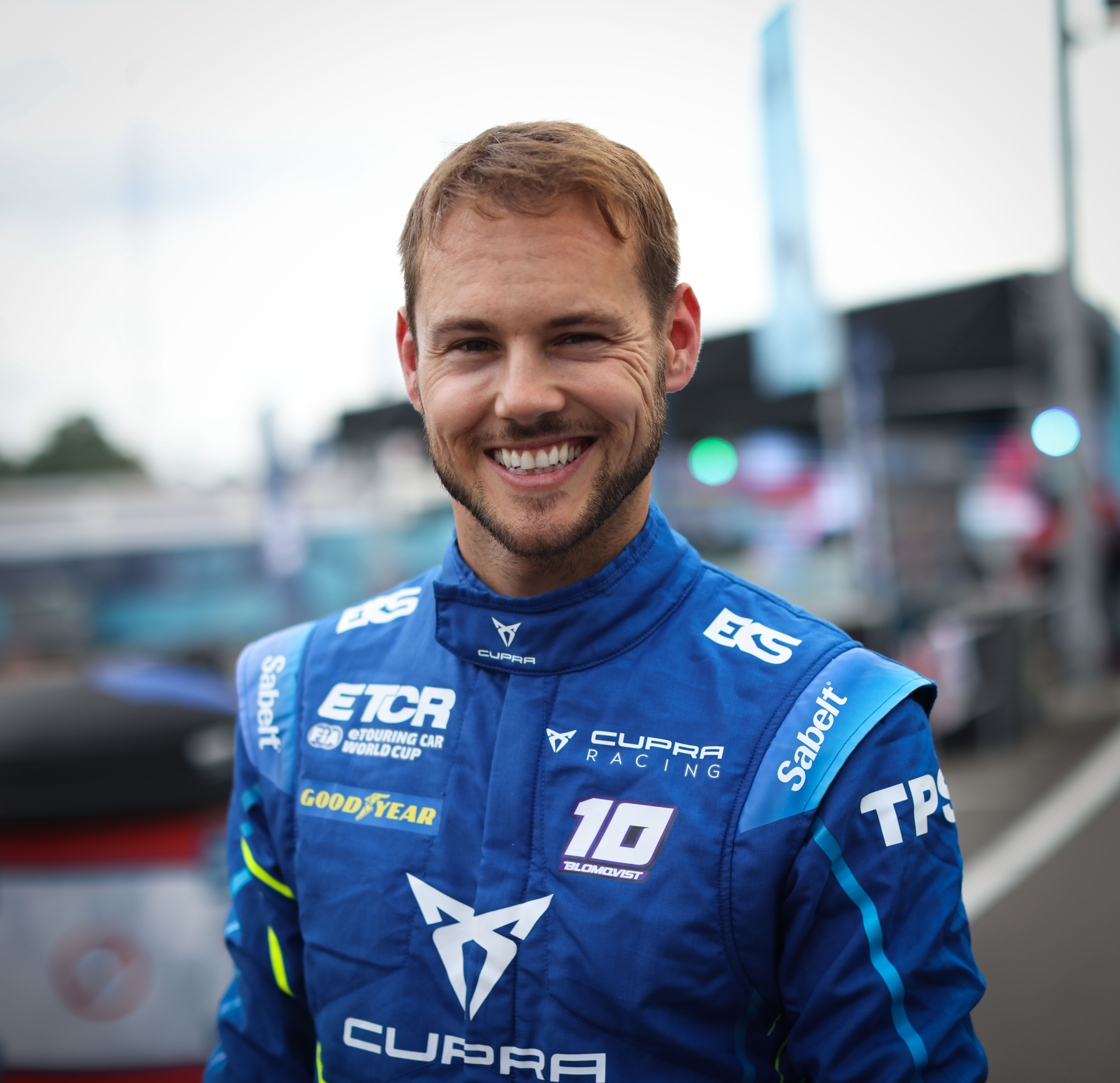
Tom Blomqvist (pictured in 2022) took the overall pole position for Meyer Shank Racing.

Qualifying was broken into four sessions, with one session for the GTP, LMP2, LMP3, GTD Pro and GTD classes, which lasted for 20 minutes for the GTP session, and 15 minutes for the LMP2, LMP3 and GTD Pro/GTD sessions. The rules dictated that all teams nominated a driver to qualify their cars, with the Pro-Am LMP2 class requiring a Bronze rated driver to qualify the car while the LMP3 class required a Bronze/Silver Rated driver to qualify the car. The competitors' fastest lap times determined the starting order. IMSA then arranged the grid to put GTPs ahead of the LMP2, LMP3, GTD Pro, and GTD cars.

The first was for cars in the GTD Pro and GTD classes. Mercedes-AMG cars dominated the session, taking the top four spots overall and claiming pole position in both classes, with the No. 79 WeatherTech Racing entry driven by Maro Engel earning pole in GTD Pro and the No. 57 Winward Racing entry driven by Philip Ellis setting the fastest time among all GTD entries. The best non-Mercedes entry was the No. 23 Heart of Racing Team Aston Martin driven by Ross Gunn. Porsche, with a new rendition of their GT3 car, struggled during qualifying, with their best qualified car being the No. 16 Wright Motorsports entry in 21st position among GTD cars, 2.8 seconds behind the fastest lap.

The second session was for cars in the LMP3 class. Nico Pino qualified on pole for the class driving the No. 33 car for Sean Creech Motorsport, besting Dakota Dickerson in the No. 36 entry from Andretti Autosport.

The third session of qualifying was for cars in the LMP2 class. For this class, IMSA mandated that the driver holding a bronze rating from the FIA (indicating amateur status) on each team qualify the car. Ben Keating qualified on pole driving the No. 52 car for PR1/Mathiasen Motorsports, with over a second gap to any other car. The session was shortened significantly by two separate incidents the occurred at the same time. John Farano, driving the No. 8 Tower Motorsports entry, crashed heavily at the Le Mans chicane, causing significant damage. At the same time, Fred Poordad, driving the No. 55 Proton Competition entry, crashed at turn 6, causing damage to the front end of his car. For causing the red flag, both the No. 8 and the No. 55 had their best two times from the session deleted.

The final session of qualifying was for the GTP class. The session was the first official session for the new class in IMSA competition. Tom Blomqvist qualified on pole driving the No. 60 car for Meyer Shank Racing, beating Felipe Nasr in the No. 7 Porsche Penske Motorsport entry by less than one tenth of a second. All cars in the class qualified within one second of the pole time. The session saw one incident when Nick Tandy, driving the No. 6 Porsche Penske Motorsport entry, crashed at the Le Mans chicane. Tandy had his best two laps from the session deleted for causing a red flag, effectively leaving him with no time set.

=== Qualifying results ===
Pole positions in each class are indicated in bold and with ‡.

Pos.	Class	No.	Entry	Driver	Time	Gap	Grid
1	**GTP**	**60**	**(United States) Meyer Shank Racing with Curb-Agajanian**	**(United Kingdom) Tom Blomqvist**	**1:34.031**	—	1‡
2	GTP	7	(Germany) Porsche Penske Motorsport	(Brazil) Felipe Nasr	1:34.114	+0.083	2
3	GTP	10	(United States) Wayne Taylor Racing with Andretti Autosport	(United States) Ricky Taylor	1:34.198	+0.167	3
4	GTP	01	(United States) Cadillac Racing	(France) Sébastien Bourdais	1:34.262	+0.231	4
5	GTP	02	(United States) Cadillac Racing	(United Kingdom) Alex Lynn	1:34.389	+0.358	5
6	GTP	31	(United States) Whelen Engineering Racing	(Brazil) Pipo Derani	1:34.608	+0.577	6
7	GTP	24	(United States) BMW M Team RLL	(Austria) Philipp Eng	1:34.723	+0.692	7
8	GTP	25	(United States) BMW M Team RLL	(United Kingdom) Nick Yelloly	1:34.846	+0.815	8
9	**LMP2**	**52**	**(United States) PR1/Mathiasen Motorsports**	**(United States) Ben Keating**	**1:40.541**	**+6.510**	10‡
10	LMP2	35	(France) TDS Racing	(France) François Heriau	1:41.751	+7.720	11
11	LMP2	11	(France) TDS Racing	(United States) Steven Thomas	1:41.813	+7.782	12
12	LMP2	88	(Italy) AF Corse	(France) François Perrodo	1:41.942	+7.911	13
13	LMP2	04	(United States) CrowdStrike Racing by APR	(United States) George Kurtz	1:41.951	+7.920	14
14	LMP2	51	(United States) Rick Ware Racing	(United States) Eric Lux	1:42.111	+8.080	15
15	LMP2	20	(Denmark) High Class Racing	(Denmark) Dennis Andersen	1:42.277	+8.246	16
16	**LMP3**	**33**	**(United States) Sean Creech Motorsport**	**(Chile) Nico Pino**	**1:43.197**	**+9.166**	20‡
17	LMP3	36	(United States) Andretti Autosport	(United States) Dakota Dickerson	1:43.307	+9.276	21
18	LMP3	38	(United States) Performance Tech Motorsports	(Australia) Cameron Shields	1:43.351	+9.320	22
19	LMP3	43	(Germany) MRS GT-Racing	(Portugal) Guilherme Oliveira	1:43.557	+9.526	23
20	LMP3	74	(United States) Riley Motorsports	(United States) Gar Robinson	1:43.840	+9.809	24
21	LMP3	85	(United States) JDC-Miller MotorSports	(United States) Luca Mars	1:43.883	+9.852	25
22	LMP2	18	(United States) Era Motorsport	(United States) Dwight Merriman	1:43.965	+9.934	17
23	LMP3	87	(United States) FastMD Racing	(Japan) Yu Kanamaru	1:44.237	+10.206	26
24	LMP3	13	(Canada) AWA	(Canada) Orey Fidani	1:45.822	+11.791	27
25	GTD	57	(United States) Winward Racing	(Switzerland) Philip Ellis	1:46.093	+12.062	59^{1}
26	LMP3	17	(Canada) AWA	(Canada) Anthony Mantella	1:46.187	+12.156	28
27	**GTD**	**75**	**(Australia) SunEnergy1 Racing**	**(Germany) Fabian Schiller**	**1:46.312**	**+12.281**	29‡
28	GTD	32	(United States) Team Korthoff Motorsports	(Canada) Mikaël Grenier	1:46.705	+12.674	30
29	**GTD Pro**	**79**	**(United States) WeatherTech Racing**	**(Germany) Maro Engel**	**1:46.784**	**+12.753**	31‡
30	GTD Pro	23	(United States) Heart of Racing Team	(United Kingdom) Ross Gunn	1:46.825	+12.794	32
31	GTD	93	(United States) Racers Edge Motorsports with WTR Andretti	(Canada) Kyle Marcelli	1:46.867	+12.836	33
32	GTD Pro	14	(United States) Vasser Sullivan Racing	(United Kingdom) Ben Barnicoat	1:46.923	+12.892	34
33	GTD	66	(United States) Gradient Racing	(Germany) Mario Farnbacher	1:46.960	+12.929	35
34	GTD	70	(United Kingdom) Inception Racing	(Germany) Marvin Kirchhöfer	1:46.979	+12.948	36
35	GTD	27	(United States) Heart of Racing Team	(Canada) Roman De Angelis	1:47.088	+13.057	37
36	GTD	12	(United States) Vasser Sullivan Racing	(United States) Aaron Telitz	1:47.361	+13.330	38
37	GTD Pro	3	(United States) Corvette Racing	(Spain) Antonio García	1:48.077	+14.046	39
38	GTD Pro	64	(United Kingdom) TGM/TF Sport	(United States) Owen Trinkler	1:48.081	+14.050	60^{2}
39	GTD Pro	63	(Italy) Iron Lynx	(Italy) Andrea Caldarelli	1:48.233	+14.202	40
40	GTD	47	(Italy) Cetilar Racing	(Italy) Antonio Fuoco	1:48.309	+14.278	41
41	GTD	19	(Italy) Iron Lynx	(France) Franck Perera	1:48.432	+14.401	61^{2}
42	GTD Pro	95	(United States) Turner Motorsport	(United States) Bill Auberlen	1:48.505	+14.474	42
43	GTD	1	(United States) Paul Miller Racing	(United States) Madison Snow	1:48.526	+14.495	43
44	GTD	96	(United States) Turner Motorsport	(United States) Robby Foley	1:48.756	+14.725	44
45	GTD	44	(United States) Magnus Racing	(United States) John Potter	1:48.820	+14.789	45
46	GTD	16	(United States) Wright Motorsports	(Belgium) Jan Heylen	1:48.942	+14.911	46
47	GTD Pro	9	(Canada) Pfaff Motorsports	(Belgium) Laurens Vanthoor	1:48.977	+14.946	47
48	GTD	83	(Italy) Iron Dames	(Switzerland) Rahel Frey	1:48.991	+14.960	48
49	GTD	78	(United States) Forte Racing Powered by US RaceTronics	(Canada) Misha Goikhberg	1:49.075	+15.044	49
50	GTD	21	(Italy) AF Corse	(Spain) Miguel Molina	1:49.265	+15.234	50
51	GTD	77	(United States) Wright Motorsports	(France) Kévin Estre	1:49.358	+15.327	51
52	GTD	92	(United States) Kelly-Moss w/ Riley	(Netherlands) Jeroen Bleekemolen	1:49.373	+15.342	52
53	GTD Pro	62	(United States) Risi Competizione	(Brazil) Daniel Serra	1:49.495	+15.464	53
54	GTD	91	(United States) Kelly-Moss w/ Riley	(France) Julien Andlauer	1:49.507	+15.476	54
55	GTD	80	(United States) AO Racing Team	(United Kingdom) Harry Tincknell	1:49.644	+15.613	55
56	LMP2	8	(United States) Tower Motorsports	(Canada) John Farano	1:49.679^{3}	+15.648	18
57	GTD	023	(United States) Triarsi Competizione	(Italy) Alessio Rovera	1:49.763	+15.732	56
58	GTD	53	(United States) MDK Motorsports	(Denmark) Jan Magnussen	1:50.628	+16.597	57
59	GTD	42	(United States) NTE Sport	(United States) Don Yount	1:50.873	+16.842	58
60	LMP2	55	(Germany) Proton Competition	(United States) Fred Poordad	1:50.969^{4}	+16.938	19
61	GTP	6	(Germany) Porsche Penske Motorsport	(United Kingdom) Nick Tandy	no time^{5}	–	9
PROVISIONAL RESULTS

- ^{1} The No. 57 Winward Racing entry initially qualified on pole position for the GTD class. However, the car suffered a major accident during post-qualifying practice, forcing the team to move to a back-up car. By IMSA rules, the entry was moved to the rear of the GTD field on the starting grid. Additionally, Lucas Auer, the driver of the car at the time of the accident, suffered lumbar injuries and was forced out of the race. Daniel Morad was signed as his injury replacement.
- ^{2} The No. 64 TGM/TF Sport entry and the No. 19 Iron Lynx entry were both moved to the back of their respective classes as per Article 40.2.3 of the Sporting regulations (Change of starting driver).
- ^{3} The No. 8 Tower Motorsports entry had its two fastest laps deleted as penalty for causing a red flag during its qualifying session.
- ^{4} The No. 55 Proton Competition entry had its two fastest laps deleted as penalty for causing a red flag during its qualifying session.
- ^{5} The No. 6 Porsche Penske Motorsport entry had its two fastest laps deleted as penalty for causing a red flag during its qualifying session.

== Race ==
=== Start and early hours ===
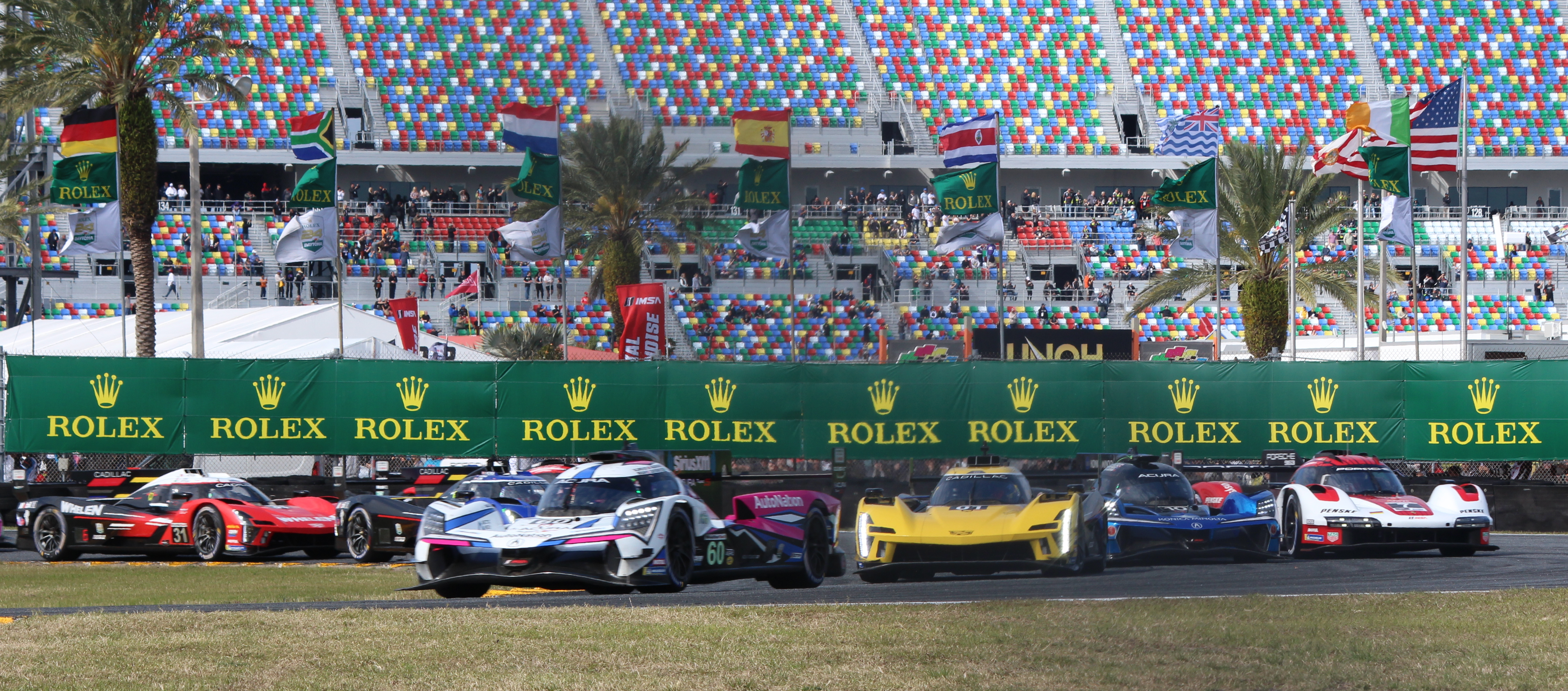
GTP class cars shortly after the start

Racing began at 1:40 p.m. EST. Tom Blomqvist in the No. 60 Meyer Shank Racing Acura took the early lead. The race quickly saw its first full course caution period when the No. 8 Tower Motorsports Oreca, one of the favorites in the LMP2 category, came to a halt with mechanical problems on the first lap. When racing resumed again, Blomqvist moved into the lead once more, while the No. 10 Wayne Taylor Racing Acura and the No. 6 Porsche Penske Motorsport Porsche battled for 2nd. At the close of the first hour, the No. 25 BMW M Team RLL BMW became the first of the GTP cars to encounter problems, as it pulled off the track and into the garage. The No. 25 would not return to the track for over three hours. In the lower classes, the No. 52 PR1/Mathiasen Motorsports Oreca led in LMP2, the No. 74 Riley Motorsports Ligier led in LMP3, the No. 23 Heart of Racing Team Aston Martin led in GTD Pro, and the No. 93 Racers' Edge Motorsports Acura led in GTD.

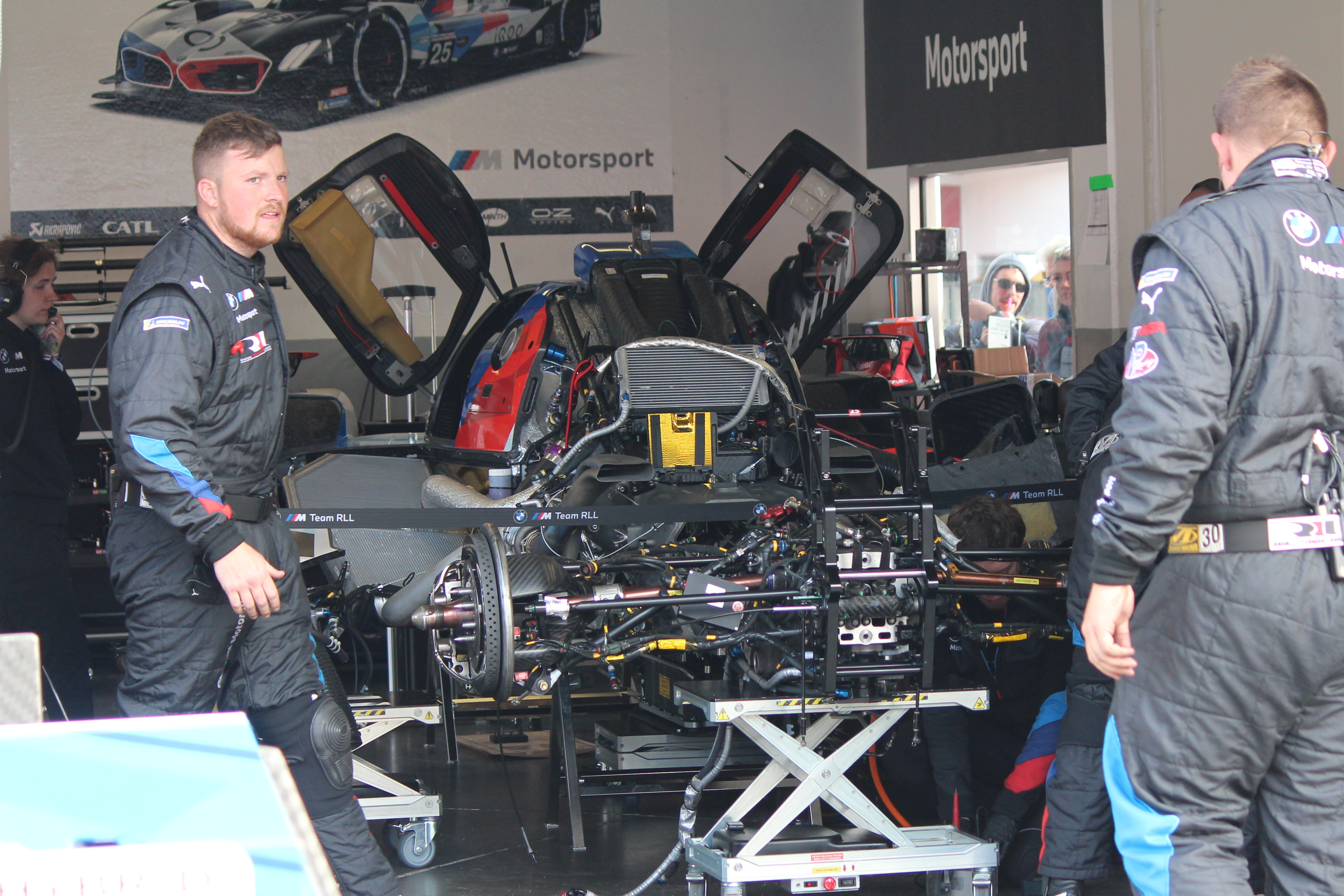
The No. 25 BMW M Hybrid V8 undergoing repairs early in the race

During the second stint of the race, the No. 60, now driven by Colin Braun, was challenged by the No. 01 and No 02 Cadillac Racing entries, with the No. 01 eventually overtaking and holding the lead at the three hour mark of the race. This came as the race was interrupted by another full course yellow near the start of the third hour, as the No. 42 NTE Sport Lambroghini suffered an accident at turn one. In the LMP3 class, the No. 74, one of the favorites for class victory, suffered an engine failure, forcing its retirement from the race. The No. 13 AWA Duqueine inherited the lead after that 74's misfortune. In the GTD ranks, the No. 3 Corvette Racing Chevrolet, driven by Jordan Taylor, moved forward and took the lead in the GTD Pro class, while the No. 93 remained in the lead of GTD. Hour 4 saw another interruption, as the No. 96 Turner Motorsport BMW came to a halt on track with driveline issues, dropping them far down the order. After the full course caution, the No. 60 reclaimed the overall lead, while further back, the No. 33 Sean Creech Motorsports Ligier took the lead in LMP3 and the No. 32 Team Korthoff Motorsports Mercedes moved to the lead of GTD, despite an incident with a prototype in the previous hour.

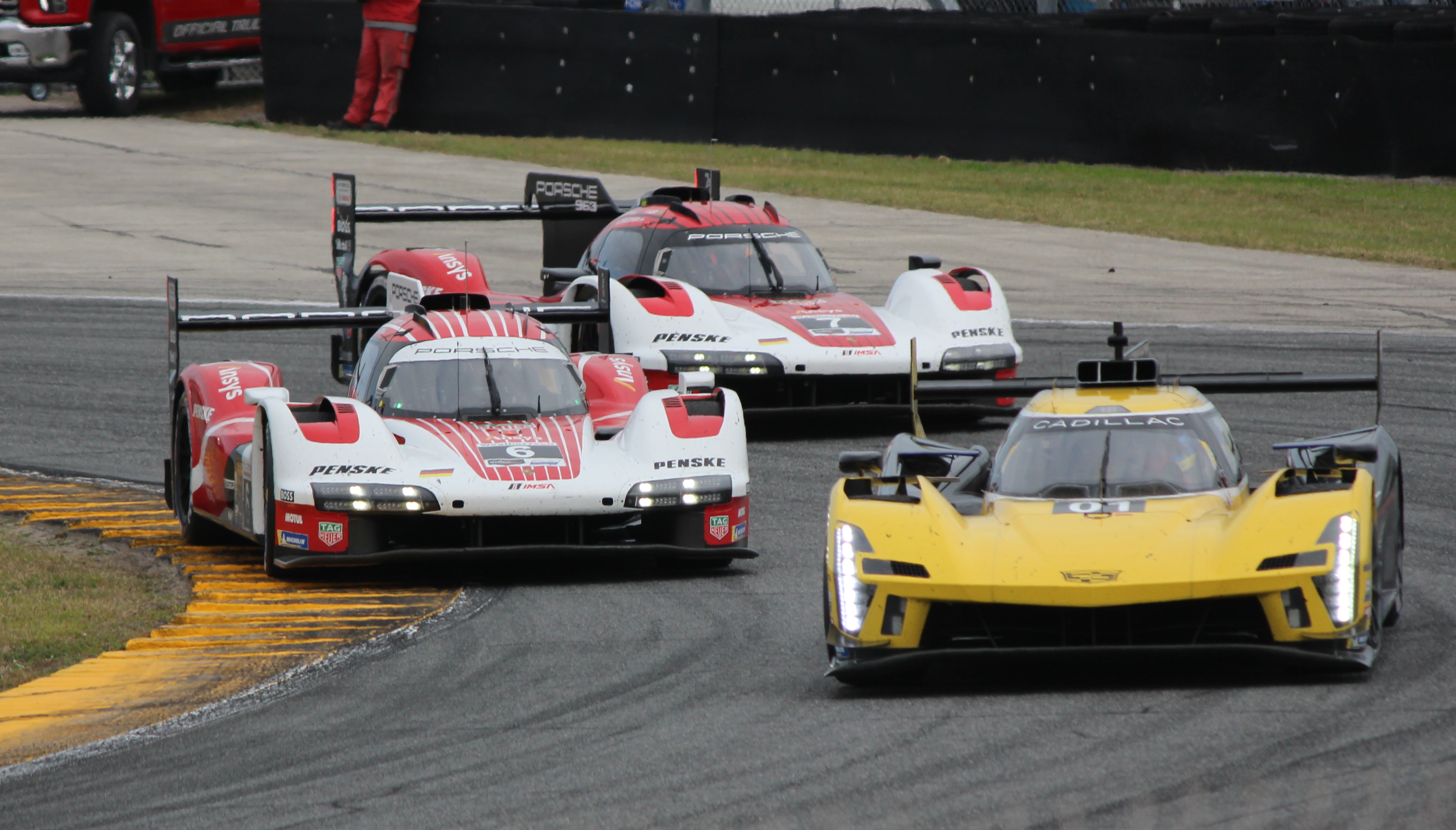
The No. 01 Cadillac V-LMDh leading the No. 6 and No. 7 Porsche 963s

=== Night ===
During the fifth hour, the No. 60 fell behind the No. 10 during pit stops. As the 60, now driven by Simon Pagenaud, attempted to catch back up, it made contact with the No. 8 Tower Motorsports Oreca, sending it spinning. Scott Dixon in the No. 01 Cadillac stopped to avoid hitting the spinning car, but behind him, the No. 13 AWA LMP3 was unable to react in time and ran into the back of Dixon. The incident sent both the 01 and 13 to the pits for repairs, with the 13 falling three laps behind the LMP3 leader. The No. 7 Porsche also suffered issues, with energy warnings forcing it into the garage for over 30 minutes. In the LMP2 class, the lead became contested by the No. 52 PR1/Mathiasen Motorsports, the No. 11 TDS Racing, and the No. 55 Proton Competition Orecas, with the 11 leading by the end of hour 6. However, the No. 11 would come to strife in the seventh hour, as drive Steven Thomas made contact with a GTD car at the Le Mans chicane, which sent him into the wall and ultimately ended the car's race. After a round of pit stops, the No. 31 Whelen Engineering Racing Cadillac, driven by Pipo Derani, led the race for the first time, while the No. 60, now drive by Hélio Castroneves, was second. On the restart, Castroneves attempted to pass for the lead, but lost control and spun, dropping him to the rear of the GTP field and forcing him to make an unscheduled pit stop for new tires. Derani led the race until the next pit cycle, where it was jumped by the No. 02 Cadillac Racing entry. PR1/Mathiasen Motorsport led in LMP2 after the demise of the No. 11, while the No. 23 Heart of Racing Team Aston Martin moved to the lead of GTD Pro.

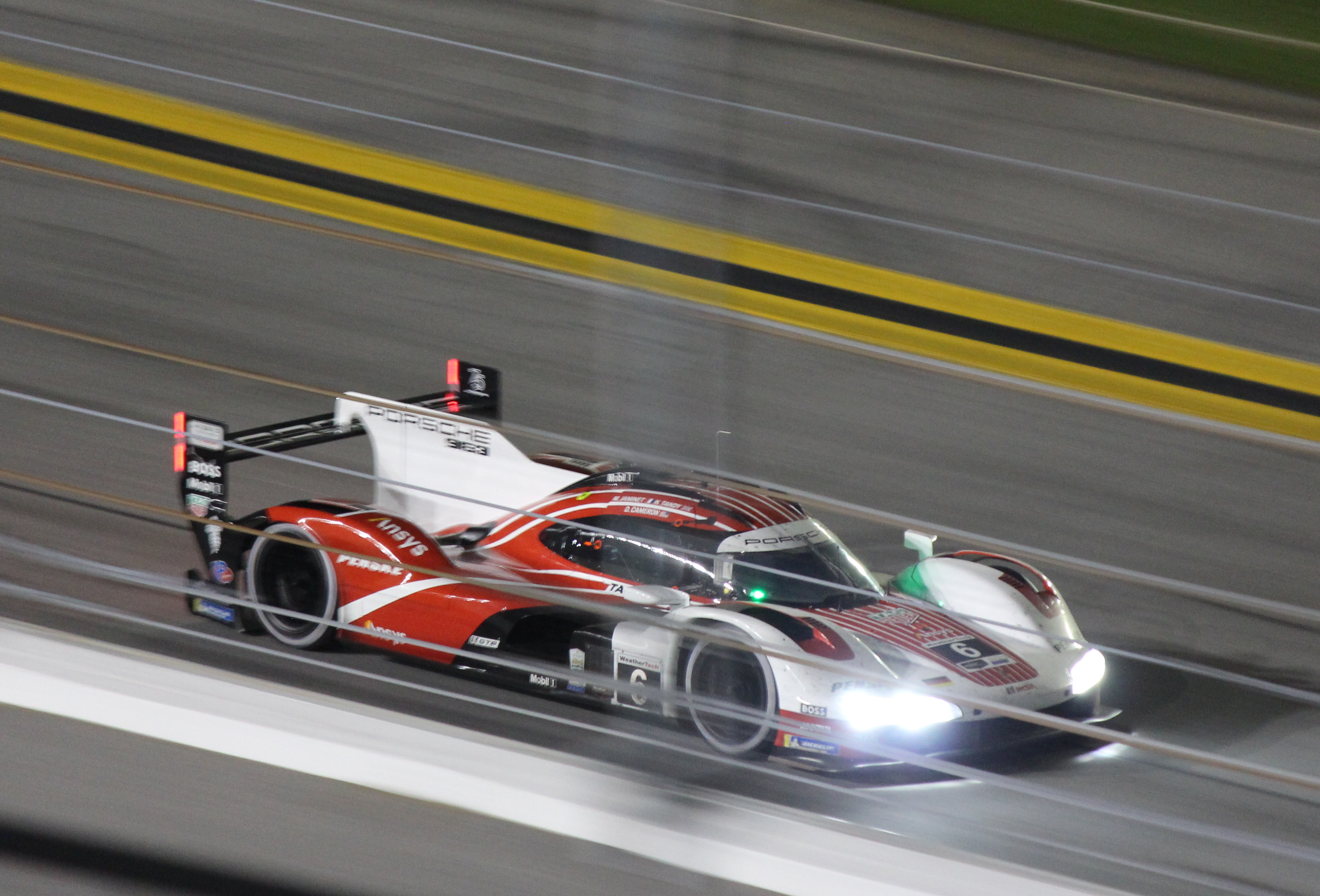
The No. 6 Porsche 963 at night

The ninth hour saw another full course yellow after a tire barrier became dislodged and dragged partially onto the racing surface. The No. 01 Cadillac inherited the lead after choosing not to pit, with the car off-sequence from the rest of the GTP field due to its earlier incident. The caution period also allowed the No. 60 to catch back up to the rest of the GTP field and recover from their earlier spin. With pit stops rearrange the running order, the No. 14 Vasser Sullivan Racing Lexus moved to the GTD Pro lead for the first time, while the No. 93 Racers' Edge Motorsports Acura returned to the GTD lead. Racing lasted only 30 minutes before another full course yellow came, this time for the No. 92 Kelly-Moss Porsche, which pulled to the side of the road at turn two with an engine failure. After pit stops, the No. 31 Cadillac led the race, while behind, the No. 60 moved into second on the restart with the No. 6 Porsche Penske Motorsports entry in third. By the end of 11 hours, the No. 60 was back in the lead. In LMP3, Nico Pino in the No. 33 Sean Creech Motorsports entry and Nicolás Varrone in the No. 17 AWA entry began battling for the lead, with the 33 eventually coming out on top. The GTD classes remained hotly contested, with the No. 57 Winward Racing Mercedes and the No. 70 Inception Racing McLaren both taking the lead for the first time during the race in the night.

The race reached its halfway point under full course caution, as the No. 43 MRS GT-Racing Ligier caught fire and stopped on the track. During the caution, the No. 60 came into the pit lane to investigate an oil leak in the gearbox. The team never fully fixed this gearbox issue and continued to the finish with some leakage continuing. The No. 10 Wayne Taylor Racing Acura suffered a broken oil fill tube during this caution, which cost them a lap to the leader repairing The pit stop dropped the 60 down to third, with the No. 6 Porsche taking the lead. The 60 returned to the lead shortly after the restart. The leaders remained largely unchanged until the next caution period in the 15th hour, when the No. 64 TGM/TF Sport Aston Martin came to a halt on track. The No. 60 once again pitted for its gearbox, promoting the No. 6 Porsche back to the lead. In LMP2, the No. 04 CrowdStrike Racing Oreca, driven by Ben Hanley moved into the lead, with the No. 35 TDS Racing entry in second. In the GT cars, the No. 79 WeatherTech Racing Mercedes returned to the lead for lead in GTD Pro, while the No. 27 Heart of Racing Team Aston Martin moved to the GTD lead.

The No. 01 Cadillac moved into the lead just before the 16th hour. The No. 6 Porsche suffered a high-speed spin in the infield section, causing damage to the bodywork of the car and costing it several laps in repair. Issues also hit the No. 31 Whelen Engineering Cadillac, as suspension damage sidelined the car for over 30 minutes. By sunrise, the battle for the overall lead was between the No. 01 Cadillac and the No. 60 Acura. The No. 35 TDS Racing Oreca took the lead of LMP2, while the battle between the No. 33 and No. 17 in LMP3 continued. In GTs, the No. 79 retained the lead of GTD Pro, while the No. 57 Winward Racing Mercedes moved to the lead of the GTD. The No. 23 Heart of Racing Team Aston Martin fell out of the fight for the GTD Pro lead after suffering suspension damage.

=== Morning ===
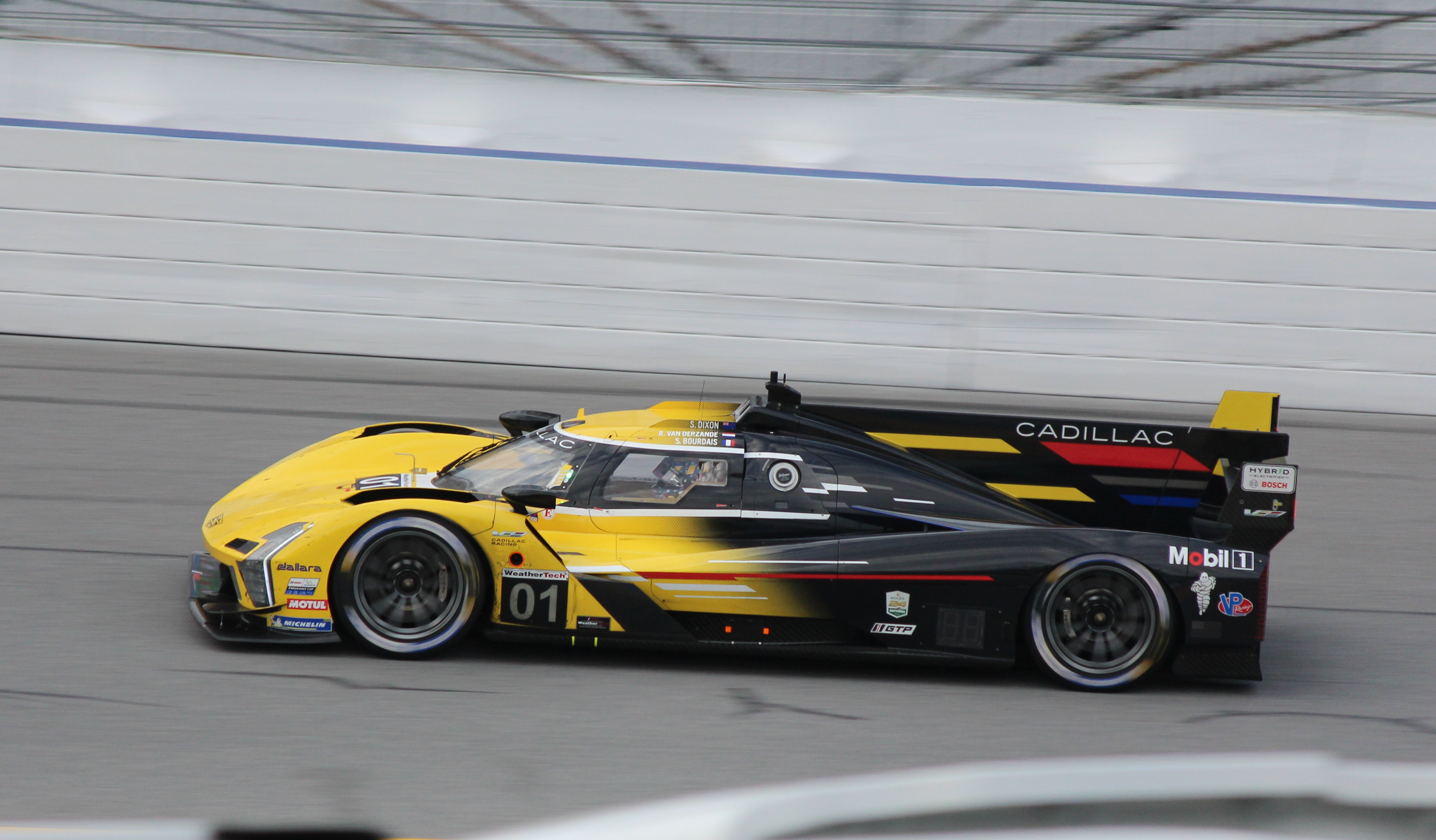
No. 01 Cadillac V-LMDh on the front straight. The No. 01 led in the early morning hours.

The No. 01 Cadillac continued to lead into the morning hours. The fight for the LMP3 lead came to a sudden end when the No. 33 Sean Creech Motorsports entry pitted at the 19 hour mark with gearbox problems, dropping it 17 laps behind the No. 17. In GTD, the No. 27 Heart of Racing Aston Martin suffered a brief setback as an electrical problem caused the car to come to a halt on course, dropping it out of the GTD battle for the time.

The 21st hour saw a full course caution for the first time in nearly six hours, as the No. 20 High Class Racing Oreca, driven by Anders Fjordbach, lost control and crashed heavily at the Le Mans Chicane. The caution allowed the No. 60 to catch back up to the No. 01, as well as bringing the No. 02 back into the fray. The yellow also benefited the No. 27, allowing it to recover from its earlier problems. At the restart, the No. 60, now driven again by Pagenaud, moved into the lead, while behind, the No. 04 returned to the lead of LMP2 and the No. 27 recovered back to the front of GTD. Racing continued for 30 minutes before dramas struck the No. 6 Porsche, which trailed smoke from the rear of the car before coming to a stop before the Le Mans Chicane. A full course yellow was called for the stricken car, and the No. 6 retired from the race with gearbox failure. The LMP2 battle tightened up in the final hours, with several cars on the lead lap and the No. 88 AF Corse entry taking the lead with two hours remaining.

=== Finish ===
Two full course cautions in the penultimate hour slowed racing, the first for the No. 64 TGM/TF Sport Aston Martin, which came to a halt with suspension damage at turn six, and the second on the restart for the No. 52 PR1/Mathiasen Motorsports Oreca, which spun and stalled at turn three. The cautions helped to bring the No. 10 Wayne Taylor Racing Acura back in with a chance at the overall win, as it finally recovered from its repairs during the night. The cautions also brought together the GTD fields, with the GTD Pro battle becoming between the No. 79 WeatherTech Racing Mercedes, the No. 3 Corvette Racing Chevrolet, and the No. 14 Vasser Sullivan Racing Lexus. The GTD battle was between five different cars. When racing resumed, the No. 60 once again took off with the lead.

With 53 minutes remaining, the No. 87 FastMD Racing Duqueine came to a halt on track, necessitating another full course caution. During this caution, most of the field came into the pit lane to make their final refueling stops. Racing resumed with 35 minutes to go, but the restart was chaotic in the GTD field. The No. 57 Winward Racing Mercedes, battling for the GTD win, made contact with the No. 3 Corvette and was shoved into the wall at turn one, breaking the 57's suspension. As the remaining cars tried to pass the slow No. 57, another incident occurred at turn three between the No. 77 VOLT Racing Porsche, the No. 21 AF Corse Ferrari, and the No. 80 AO Racing Team Porsche. The incidents left debris strewn across the track and caused the retirements of both the 57 and the 21, leading to the final full course caution period of the race.

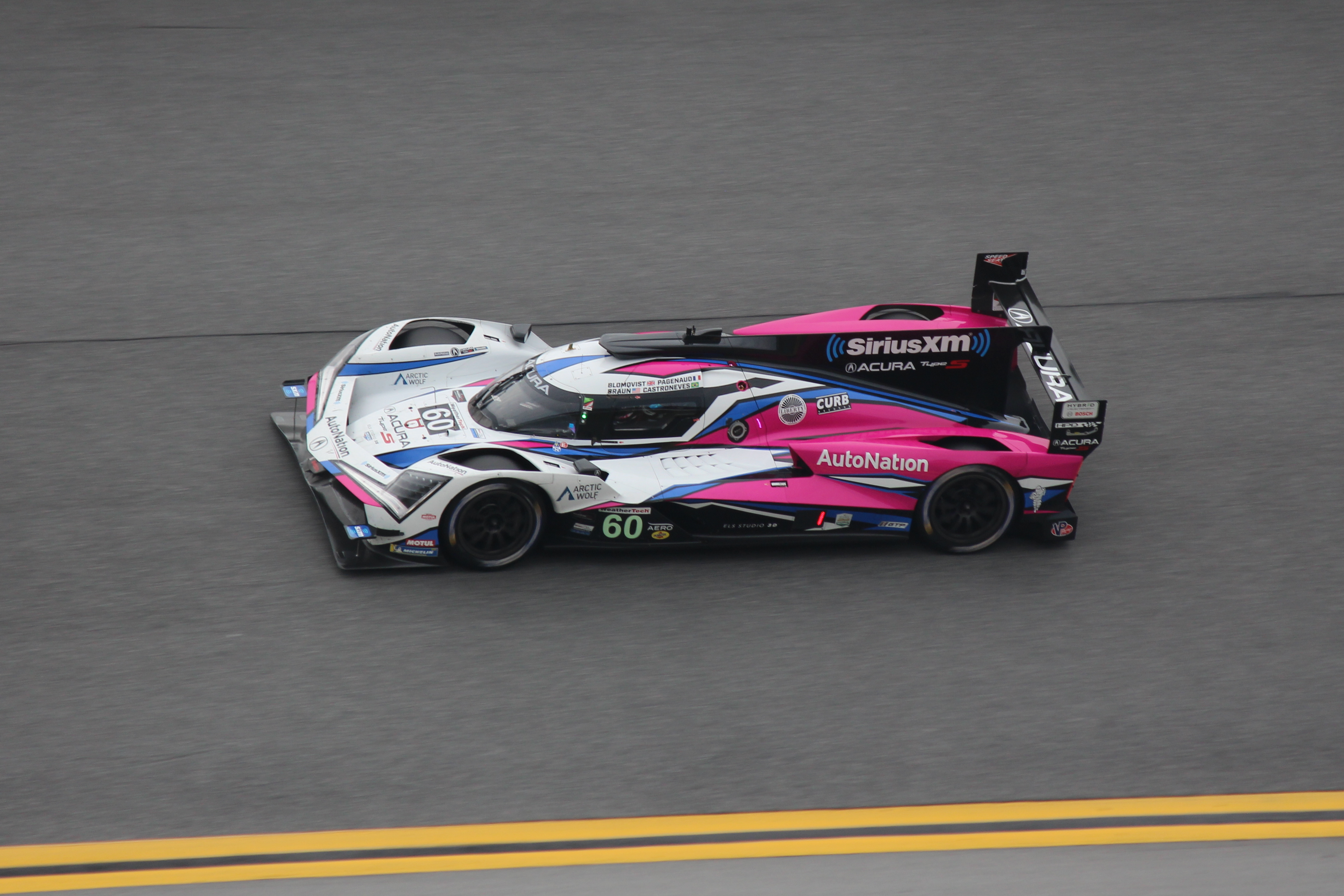
The No. 60 Acura ARX-06 en route to victory

The final restart came with 27 minutes remaining. Once again, the No. 60 took off in front, but now with the No. 10 pursuing. The No. 60 would not be caught, and Meyer Shank Racing won, their second consecutive victory in the event and the first victory ever for the LMDh cars. It was the third consecutive victory for Castroneves, and the second consecutive for Pagenaud and Blomqvist. The LMP2 race became a battle between the No. 04 CrowdStrike Racing entry and the No. 55 Proton Competition entry. The LMP2 battle was the most dramatic finish in the field, with the No. 55, driven by James Allen making the pass for the win in a photo finish decided by 0.016 second. In the LMP3 class, the No. 17 AWA Duqueine cruised to victory in the class with a 12 lap lead over their nearest competitor and having been unchallenged since the gearbox issues for the No. 33 in the morning hours. In GTD Pro, the No. 79 WeatherTech Racing Mercedes, driven to the finish by Maro Engel, held off the No. 3 Corvette for victory. In the GTD class, the No. 27 Heart of Racing Aston Martin took victory over the No. 44 Magnus Racing Aston Martin and was the best placed of all GTD cars in the field despite its Pro-Am driver lineup.

== Post-race ==
On March 8, 2023, IMSA announced that the race-winning No. 60 Meyer Shank Racing (MSR) team was penalized for manipulating tire pressure data during the race. The manipulation was discovered by their car provider Honda Performance Development (HPD), who reported it to IMSA. Although the win and its spoils were retained, the team lost its lead in the GTP championship standings, received a 200-point penalty, lost all team and driver Michelin Endurance Cup points, and forfeited race prize money. The team also received a $50,000 fine, with team and entrant representative Mike Shank placed on probation until June 30, 2023. Team engineer Ryan McCarthy was suspended indefinitely and had his annual credential revoked. The second-place finishing No. 10 Wayne Taylor Racing team did not push for harsher punishment, stating that they "respect the process and the decision made by IMSA". HPD stated that they are "extremely disappointed in the misconduct of the Meyer Shank Racing team during the Daytona race" and that they "completely support the action of IMSA in this matter".

According to Racer magazine's Marshall Pruett, there were multiple other GTP cars besides the No. 60 MSR entry that ran non-compliant tire pressures during the race.

Since it was the season's first race, Albuquerque, Taylor, Delétraz, and Hartley led the GTP Drivers' Championship with 350 points each following Meyer Shank Racing's penalty. Bourdais, van der Zande, and Dixon were second with 328 points each. Bamber, Lynn, and Westbrook were third with 306 points. Gounon, Juncadella, Engel, and MacNeil took the GTD Pro points standings lead with García, Taylor, and Milner placing second. Barnicoat, Hawksworth, and Conway rounded out the top three. De Angelis, Sørensen, James, and Turner led the GTD Drivers' Championship, followed by the second-placed Lally, Potter, Pumpelly, and Thiim. Iribe, Schandorff, Millroy, and Kirchhöfer were third. LMP2 drivers and teams as well as LMP3 drivers and teams didn't score full season points due to the event only counting towards the Michelin Endurance Cup. WTR with Andretti Autosport, WeatherTech Racing, and Heart of Racing Team became the leaders of their respective class Teams' Championships. Acura, Mercedes-AMG, and Aston Martin assumed the lead of their respective Manufacturers' Championships with ten races left in the season.

== Results ==
Class winners denoted in bold and with ‡

Pos	Class	No.	Team / Entrant	Drivers	Chassis	Laps	Time/Retired
Pos	Class	No.	Team / Entrant	Drivers	Engine	Laps	Time/Retired
1	**GTP**	**60**	**(United States) Meyer Shank Racing with Curb-Agajanian**	**(United Kingdom) Tom Blomqvist (United States) Colin Braun (Brazil) Hélio Castroneves (France) Simon Pagenaud**	**Acura ARX-06**	**783**	**24:01:19.952‡**
1	**GTP**	**60**	**(United States) Meyer Shank Racing with Curb-Agajanian**	**(United Kingdom) Tom Blomqvist (United States) Colin Braun (Brazil) Hélio Castroneves (France) Simon Pagenaud**	**Acura AR24e 2.4 L Turbo V6**	**783**	**24:01:19.952‡**
2	GTP	10	(United States) Wayne Taylor Racing with Andretti Autosport	(Portugal) Filipe Albuquerque (Switzerland) Louis Delétraz (New Zealand) Brendon Hartley (United States) Ricky Taylor	Acura ARX-06	783	+4.190
2	GTP	10	(United States) Wayne Taylor Racing with Andretti Autosport	(Portugal) Filipe Albuquerque (Switzerland) Louis Delétraz (New Zealand) Brendon Hartley (United States) Ricky Taylor	Acura AR24e 2.4 L Turbo V6	783	+4.190
3	GTP	01	(United States) Cadillac Racing	(France) Sébastien Bourdais (New Zealand) Scott Dixon (Netherlands) Renger van der Zande	Cadillac V-LMDh	783	+9.630
3	GTP	01	(United States) Cadillac Racing	(France) Sébastien Bourdais (New Zealand) Scott Dixon (Netherlands) Renger van der Zande	Cadillac LMC55R 5.5 L V8	783	+9.630
4	GTP	02	(United States) Cadillac Racing	(New Zealand) Earl Bamber (United Kingdom) Alex Lynn (United Kingdom) Richard Westbrook	Cadillac V-LMDh	783	+11.176
4	GTP	02	(United States) Cadillac Racing	(New Zealand) Earl Bamber (United Kingdom) Alex Lynn (United Kingdom) Richard Westbrook	Cadillac LMC55R 5.5 L V8	783	+11.176
5	GTP	31	(United States) Whelen Engineering Racing	(United Kingdom) Jack Aitken (Brazil) Pipo Derani (United Kingdom) Alexander Sims	Cadillac V-LMDh	771	+12 Laps
5	GTP	31	(United States) Whelen Engineering Racing	(United Kingdom) Jack Aitken (Brazil) Pipo Derani (United Kingdom) Alexander Sims	Cadillac LMC55R 5.5 L V8	771	+12 Laps
6	GTP	24	(United States) BMW M Team RLL	(Austria) Philipp Eng (Brazil) Augusto Farfus (United States) Colton Herta (Germany) Marco Wittmann	BMW M Hybrid V8	768	+15 Laps
6	GTP	24	(United States) BMW M Team RLL	(Austria) Philipp Eng (Brazil) Augusto Farfus (United States) Colton Herta (Germany) Marco Wittmann	BMW P66/3 4.0 L Turbo V8	768	+15 Laps
7	**LMP2**	**55**	**(Germany) Proton Competition**	**(Australia) James Allen (Italy) Gianmaria Bruni (Italy) Francesco Pizzi (United States) Fred Poordad**	**Oreca 07**	**761**	**+22 Laps‡**
7	**LMP2**	**55**	**(Germany) Proton Competition**	**(Australia) James Allen (Italy) Gianmaria Bruni (Italy) Francesco Pizzi (United States) Fred Poordad**	**Gibson GK428 4.2 L V8**	**761**	**+22 Laps‡**
8	LMP2	04	(United States) CrowdStrike Racing by APR	(Mexico) Esteban Gutiérrez (United Kingdom) Ben Hanley (United States) George Kurtz (United States) Matt McMurry	Oreca 07	761	+22 Laps
8	LMP2	04	(United States) CrowdStrike Racing by APR	(Mexico) Esteban Gutiérrez (United Kingdom) Ben Hanley (United States) George Kurtz (United States) Matt McMurry	Gibson GK428 4.2 L V8	761	+22 Laps
9	LMP2	88	(Italy) AF Corse	(France) Julien Canal (Denmark) Nicklas Nielsen (France) François Perrodo (France) Matthieu Vaxivière	Oreca 07	761	+22 Laps
9	LMP2	88	(Italy) AF Corse	(France) Julien Canal (Denmark) Nicklas Nielsen (France) François Perrodo (France) Matthieu Vaxivière	Gibson GK428 4.2 L V8	761	+22 Laps
10	LMP2	35	(France) TDS Racing	(Netherlands) Giedo van der Garde (France) François Heriau (United States) Josh Pierson (Netherlands) Job van Uitert	Oreca 07	761	+22 Laps
10	LMP2	35	(France) TDS Racing	(Netherlands) Giedo van der Garde (France) François Heriau (United States) Josh Pierson (Netherlands) Job van Uitert	Gibson GK428 4.2 L V8	761	+22 Laps
11	LMP2	8	(United States) Tower Motorsports	(Canada) John Farano (New Zealand) Scott McLaughlin (United States) Josef Newgarden (Barbados) Kyffin Simpson	Oreca 07	759	+24 Laps
11	LMP2	8	(United States) Tower Motorsports	(Canada) John Farano (New Zealand) Scott McLaughlin (United States) Josef Newgarden (Barbados) Kyffin Simpson	Gibson GK428 4.2 L V8	759	+24 Laps
12	LMP2	51	(United States) Rick Ware Racing	(United States) Austin Cindric (Canada) Devlin DeFrancesco (Brazil) Pietro Fittipaldi (United States) Eric Lux	Oreca 07	758	+25 Laps
12	LMP2	51	(United States) Rick Ware Racing	(United States) Austin Cindric (Canada) Devlin DeFrancesco (Brazil) Pietro Fittipaldi (United States) Eric Lux	Gibson GK428 4.2 L V8	758	+25 Laps
13	LMP2	52	(United States) PR1/Mathiasen Motorsports	(France) Paul-Loup Chatin (United States) Ben Keating (France) Nicolas Lapierre (United Kingdom) Alex Quinn	Oreca 07	757	+26 Laps
13	LMP2	52	(United States) PR1/Mathiasen Motorsports	(France) Paul-Loup Chatin (United States) Ben Keating (France) Nicolas Lapierre (United Kingdom) Alex Quinn	Gibson GK428 4.2 L V8	757	+26 Laps
14	GTP	7	(Germany) Porsche Penske Motorsport	(Australia) Matt Campbell (Denmark) Michael Christensen (Brazil) Felipe Nasr	Porsche 963	749	+34 Laps
14	GTP	7	(Germany) Porsche Penske Motorsport	(Australia) Matt Campbell (Denmark) Michael Christensen (Brazil) Felipe Nasr	Porsche 9RD 4.6 L Turbo V8	749	+34 Laps
15	**LMP3**	**17**	**(Canada) AWA**	**(United Kingdom) Wayne Boyd (Canada) Anthony Mantella (United States) Thomas Merrill (Argentina) Nicolás Varrone**	**Duqueine M30 - D08**	**737**	**+46 Laps‡**
15	**LMP3**	**17**	**(Canada) AWA**	**(United Kingdom) Wayne Boyd (Canada) Anthony Mantella (United States) Thomas Merrill (Argentina) Nicolás Varrone**	**Nissan VK56DE 5.6 L V8**	**737**	**+46 Laps‡**
16	**GTD**	**27**	**(United States) Heart of Racing Team**	**(Canada) Roman De Angelis (United Kingdom) Ian James (Denmark) Marco Sørensen (United Kingdom) Darren Turner**	**Aston Martin Vantage AMR GT3**	**729**	**+54 Laps‡**
16	**GTD**	**27**	**(United States) Heart of Racing Team**	**(Canada) Roman De Angelis (United Kingdom) Ian James (Denmark) Marco Sørensen (United Kingdom) Darren Turner**	**Aston Martin 4.0 L Turbo V8**	**729**	**+54 Laps‡**
17	**GTD; Pro**	**79**	**(United States) WeatherTech Racing**	**(Germany) Maro Engel (Andorra) Jules Gounon (Spain) Daniel Juncadella (United States) Cooper MacNeil**	**Mercedes-AMG GT3 Evo**	**729**	**+54 Laps‡**
17	**GTD; Pro**	**79**	**(United States) WeatherTech Racing**	**(Germany) Maro Engel (Andorra) Jules Gounon (Spain) Daniel Juncadella (United States) Cooper MacNeil**	**Mercedes-AMG M159 6.2 L V8**	**729**	**+54 Laps‡**
18	GTD	44	(United States) Magnus Racing	(United States) Andy Lally (United States) John Potter (United States) Spencer Pumpelly (Denmark) Nicki Thiim	Aston Martin Vantage AMR GT3	729	+54 Laps
18	GTD	44	(United States) Magnus Racing	(United States) Andy Lally (United States) John Potter (United States) Spencer Pumpelly (Denmark) Nicki Thiim	Aston Martin 4.0 L Turbo V8	729	+54 Laps
19	GTD; Pro	3	(United States) Corvette Racing	(Spain) Antonio García (United States) Tommy Milner (United States) Jordan Taylor	Chevrolet Corvette C8.R GTD	729	+54 Laps
19	GTD; Pro	3	(United States) Corvette Racing	(Spain) Antonio García (United States) Tommy Milner (United States) Jordan Taylor	Chevrolet 5.5 L V8	729	+54 Laps
20	GTD; Pro	14	(United States) Vasser Sullivan Racing	(United Kingdom) Ben Barnicoat (United Kingdom) Mike Conway (United Kingdom) Jack Hawksworth	Lexus RC F GT3	729	+54 Laps
20	GTD; Pro	14	(United States) Vasser Sullivan Racing	(United Kingdom) Ben Barnicoat (United Kingdom) Mike Conway (United Kingdom) Jack Hawksworth	Toyota 2UR 5.0 L V8	729	+54 Laps
21	GTD	70	(United Kingdom) Inception Racing	(United States) Brendan Iribe (Germany) Marvin Kirchhöfer (United Kingdom) Ollie Millroy (Denmark) Frederik Schandorff	McLaren 720S GT3	729	+54 Laps
21	GTD	70	(United Kingdom) Inception Racing	(United States) Brendan Iribe (Germany) Marvin Kirchhöfer (United Kingdom) Ollie Millroy (Denmark) Frederik Schandorff	McLaren M840T 4.0 L Turbo V8	729	+54 Laps
22	GTD	66	(United States) Gradient Racing	(Germany) Mario Farnbacher (United Kingdom) Katherine Legge (United States) Marc Miller (United States) Sheena Monk	Acura NSX GT3 Evo22	729	+54 Laps
22	GTD	66	(United States) Gradient Racing	(Germany) Mario Farnbacher (United Kingdom) Katherine Legge (United States) Marc Miller (United States) Sheena Monk	Acura 3.5 L Turbo V6	729	+54 Laps
23	GTD	12	(United States) Vasser Sullivan Racing	(United States) Kyle Kirkwood (United States) Frankie Montecalvo (United States) Aaron Telitz (Canada) Parker Thompson	Lexus RC F GT3	728	+55 Laps
23	GTD	12	(United States) Vasser Sullivan Racing	(United States) Kyle Kirkwood (United States) Frankie Montecalvo (United States) Aaron Telitz (Canada) Parker Thompson	Toyota 2UR 5.0 L V8	728	+55 Laps
24	GTD; Pro	63	(Italy) Iron Lynx	(Italy) Mirko Bortolotti (Italy) Andrea Caldarelli (France) Romain Grosjean (South Africa) Jordan Pepper	Lamborghini Huracán GT3 Evo 2	728	+55 Laps
24	GTD; Pro	63	(Italy) Iron Lynx	(Italy) Mirko Bortolotti (Italy) Andrea Caldarelli (France) Romain Grosjean (South Africa) Jordan Pepper	Lamborghini 5.2 L V10	728	+55 Laps
25	GTD; Pro	9	(Canada) Pfaff Motorsports	(Austria) Klaus Bachler (France) Patrick Pilet (Belgium) Laurens Vanthoor	Porsche 911 GT3 R (992)	728	+55 Laps
25	GTD; Pro	9	(Canada) Pfaff Motorsports	(Austria) Klaus Bachler (France) Patrick Pilet (Belgium) Laurens Vanthoor	Porsche 4.2 L Flat-6	728	+55 Laps
26	GTD	93	(United States) Racers Edge Motorsports with WTR Andretti	(Australia) Ryan Briscoe (Costa Rica) Danny Formal (United States) Ashton Harrison (Canada) Kyle Marcelli	Acura NSX GT3 Evo22	727	+56 Laps
26	GTD	93	(United States) Racers Edge Motorsports with WTR Andretti	(Australia) Ryan Briscoe (Costa Rica) Danny Formal (United States) Ashton Harrison (Canada) Kyle Marcelli	Acura 3.5 L Turbo V6	727	+56 Laps
27	GTD	78	(United States) US RaceTronics	(Canada) Misha Goikhberg (Chile) Benjamín Hites (Italy) Marco Mapelli (Italy) Loris Spinelli	Lamborghini Huracán GT3 Evo 2	726	+57 Laps
27	GTD	78	(United States) US RaceTronics	(Canada) Misha Goikhberg (Chile) Benjamín Hites (Italy) Marco Mapelli (Italy) Loris Spinelli	Lamborghini 5.2 L V10	726	+57 Laps
28	GTD	1	(United States) Paul Miller Racing	(United States) Corey Lewis (Belgium) Maxime Martin (United States) Bryan Sellers (United States) Madison Snow	BMW M4 GT3	726	+57 Laps
28	GTD	1	(United States) Paul Miller Racing	(United States) Corey Lewis (Belgium) Maxime Martin (United States) Bryan Sellers (United States) Madison Snow	BMW SS58B30T0 3.0 L Turbo I6	726	+57 Laps
29	LMP3	33	(United States) Sean Creech Motorsport	(Portugal) João Barbosa (Chile) Nico Pino (United States) Nolan Siegel (United States) Lance Willsey	Ligier JS P320	725	+58 Laps
29	LMP3	33	(United States) Sean Creech Motorsport	(Portugal) João Barbosa (Chile) Nico Pino (United States) Nolan Siegel (United States) Lance Willsey	Nissan VK56DE 5.6 L V8	725	+58 Laps
30	GTD	16	(United States) Wright Motorsports	(United States) Ryan Hardwick (Belgium) Jan Heylen (Norway) Dennis Olsen (Canada) Zacharie Robichon	Porsche 911 GT3 R (992)	723	+60 Laps
30	GTD	16	(United States) Wright Motorsports	(United States) Ryan Hardwick (Belgium) Jan Heylen (Norway) Dennis Olsen (Canada) Zacharie Robichon	Porsche 4.2 L Flat-6	723	+60 Laps
31	LMP3	38	(United States) Performance Tech Motorsports	(United States) Christopher Allen (United States) Connor Bloum (United States) John De Angelis (Australia) Cameron Shields	Ligier JS P320	721	+62 Laps
31	LMP3	38	(United States) Performance Tech Motorsports	(United States) Christopher Allen (United States) Connor Bloum (United States) John De Angelis (Australia) Cameron Shields	Nissan VK56DE 5.6 L V8	721	+62 Laps
32	GTD	023	(United States) Triarsi Competizione	(Italy) Andrea Bertolini (Italy) Alessio Rovera (United States) Charlie Scardina (United States) Onofrio Triarsi	Ferrari 296 GT3	719	+64 Laps
32	GTD	023	(United States) Triarsi Competizione	(Italy) Andrea Bertolini (Italy) Alessio Rovera (United States) Charlie Scardina (United States) Onofrio Triarsi	Ferrari 3.0 L Turbo V6	719	+64 Laps
33	GTD	77	(United States) Wright Motorsports	(United States) Alan Brynjolfsson (France) Kévin Estre (United States) Trent Hindman (United States) Max Root	Porsche 911 GT3 R (992)	719	+64 Laps
33	GTD	77	(United States) Wright Motorsports	(United States) Alan Brynjolfsson (France) Kévin Estre (United States) Trent Hindman (United States) Max Root	Porsche 4.2 L Flat-6	719	+64 Laps
34	GTD; Pro	53	(United States) MDK Motorsports	(United States) Trenton Estep (United States) Jason Hart (United States) Mark Kvamme (Denmark) Jan Magnussen	Porsche 911 GT3 R (992)	717	+66 Laps
34	GTD; Pro	53	(United States) MDK Motorsports	(United States) Trenton Estep (United States) Jason Hart (United States) Mark Kvamme (Denmark) Jan Magnussen	Porsche 4.2 L Flat-6	717	+66 Laps
35	LMP3	13	(Canada) AWA	(United Kingdom) Matt Bell (Canada) Orey Fidani (Germany) Lars Kern (Germany) Moritz Kranz	Duqueine M30 - D08	717	+66 Laps
35	LMP3	13	(Canada) AWA	(United Kingdom) Matt Bell (Canada) Orey Fidani (Germany) Lars Kern (Germany) Moritz Kranz	Nissan VK56DE 5.6 L V8	717	+66 Laps
36	GTD; Pro	23	(United States) Heart of Racing Team	(United Kingdom) Ross Gunn (United Kingdom) David Pittard (Spain) Alex Riberas	Aston Martin Vantage AMR GT3	716	+67 Laps
36	GTD; Pro	23	(United States) Heart of Racing Team	(United Kingdom) Ross Gunn (United Kingdom) David Pittard (Spain) Alex Riberas	Aston Martin 4.0 L Turbo V8	716	+67 Laps
37	LMP3	85	(United States) JDC-Miller MotorSports	(United Kingdom) Till Bechtolsheimer (United States) Mason Filippi (Netherlands) Tijmen van der Helm (United States) Luca Mars	Duqueine M30 - D08	715	+68 Laps
37	LMP3	85	(United States) JDC-Miller MotorSports	(United Kingdom) Till Bechtolsheimer (United States) Mason Filippi (Netherlands) Tijmen van der Helm (United States) Luca Mars	Nissan VK56DE 5.6 L V8	715	+68 Laps
38	GTD	19	(Italy) Iron Lynx	(Italy) Raffaele Giammaria (Switzerland) Rolf Ineichen (France) Franck Perera (Italy) Claudio Schiavoni	Lamborghini Huracán GT3 Evo 2	714	+69 Laps
38	GTD	19	(Italy) Iron Lynx	(Italy) Raffaele Giammaria (Switzerland) Rolf Ineichen (France) Franck Perera (Italy) Claudio Schiavoni	Lamborghini 5.2 L V10	714	+69 Laps
39 DNF	GTD	57	(United States) Winward Racing	(Netherlands) Indy Dontje (Switzerland) Philip Ellis (Canada) Daniel Morad (United States) Russell Ward	Mercedes-AMG GT3 Evo	710	Accident damage
39 DNF	GTD	57	(United States) Winward Racing	(Netherlands) Indy Dontje (Switzerland) Philip Ellis (Canada) Daniel Morad (United States) Russell Ward	Mercedes-AMG M159 6.2 L V8	710	Accident damage
40	GTD	80	(United States) AO Racing Team	(United States) P. J. Hyett (United States) Gunnar Jeannette (United Kingdom) Sebastian Priaulx (United Kingdom) Harry Tincknell	Porsche 911 GT3 R (992)	710	+73 Laps
40	GTD	80	(United States) AO Racing Team	(United States) P. J. Hyett (United States) Gunnar Jeannette (United Kingdom) Sebastian Priaulx (United Kingdom) Harry Tincknell	Porsche 4.2 L Flat-6	710	+73 Laps
41	GTD	32	(United States) Team Korthoff Motorsports	(Germany) Maximilian Götz (Canada) Mikaël Grenier (United States) Kenton Koch (United States) Mike Skeen	Mercedes-AMG GT3 Evo	709	+74 Laps
41	GTD	32	(United States) Team Korthoff Motorsports	(Germany) Maximilian Götz (Canada) Mikaël Grenier (United States) Kenton Koch (United States) Mike Skeen	Mercedes-AMG M159 6.2 L V8	709	+74 Laps
42 DNF	GTP	6	(Germany) Porsche Penske Motorsport	(United States) Dane Cameron (France) Mathieu Jaminet (United Kingdom) Nick Tandy	Porsche 963	700	Gearbox
42 DNF	GTP	6	(Germany) Porsche Penske Motorsport	(United States) Dane Cameron (France) Mathieu Jaminet (United Kingdom) Nick Tandy	Porsche 9RD 4.6 L Turbo V8	700	Gearbox
43	GTD	91	(United States) Kelly-Moss with Riley	(France) Julien Andlauer (Netherlands) Kay van Berlo (New Zealand) Jaxon Evans (United States) Alan Metni	Porsche 911 GT3 R (992)	699	+84 Laps
43	GTD	91	(United States) Kelly-Moss with Riley	(France) Julien Andlauer (Netherlands) Kay van Berlo (New Zealand) Jaxon Evans (United States) Alan Metni	Porsche 4.2 L Flat-6	699	+84 Laps
44	GTD	96	(United States) Turner Motorsport	(United States) Michael Dinan (United States) Robby Foley (United States) Patrick Gallagher (Germany) Jens Klingmann	BMW M4 GT3	695	+88 Laps
44	GTD	96	(United States) Turner Motorsport	(United States) Michael Dinan (United States) Robby Foley (United States) Patrick Gallagher (Germany) Jens Klingmann	BMW SS58B30T0 3.0 L Turbo I6	695	+88 Laps
45	GTD; Pro	64	(United Kingdom) TGM/TF Sport	(United States) Ted Giovanis (United States) Hugh Plumb (United States) Matt Plumb (United States) Owen Trinkler	Aston Martin Vantage AMR GT3	674	+109 Laps
45	GTD; Pro	64	(United Kingdom) TGM/TF Sport	(United States) Ted Giovanis (United States) Hugh Plumb (United States) Matt Plumb (United States) Owen Trinkler	Aston Martin 4.0 L Turbo V8	674	+109 Laps
46	GTD	83	(Italy) Iron Dames	(Belgium) Sarah Bovy (Switzerland) Rahel Frey (Denmark) Michelle Gatting (France) Doriane Pin	Lamborghini Huracán GT3 Evo 2	659	+124 Laps
46	GTD	83	(Italy) Iron Dames	(Belgium) Sarah Bovy (Switzerland) Rahel Frey (Denmark) Michelle Gatting (France) Doriane Pin	Lamborghini 5.2 L V10	659	+124 Laps
47 DNF	GTD	21	(Italy) AF Corse	(Italy) Francesco Castellacci (United Kingdom) Simon Mann (Spain) Miguel Molina (Argentina) Luis Pérez Companc	Ferrari 296 GT3	655	Accident
47 DNF	GTD	21	(Italy) AF Corse	(Italy) Francesco Castellacci (United Kingdom) Simon Mann (Spain) Miguel Molina (Argentina) Luis Pérez Companc	Ferrari 3.0 L Turbo V6	655	Accident
48	GTP	25	(United States) BMW M Team RLL	(United States) Connor De Phillippi (United States) Colton Herta (South Africa) Sheldon van der Linde (United Kingdom) Nick Yelloly	BMW M Hybrid V8	652	+131 Laps
48	GTP	25	(United States) BMW M Team RLL	(United States) Connor De Phillippi (United States) Colton Herta (South Africa) Sheldon van der Linde (United Kingdom) Nick Yelloly	BMW P66/3 4.0 L Turbo V8	652	+131 Laps
49 DNF	LMP2	20	(Denmark) High Class Racing	(Denmark) Dennis Andersen (Denmark) Anders Fjordbach (United Arab Emirates) Ed Jones (Switzerland) Raffaele Marciello	Oreca 07	646	Accident
49 DNF	LMP2	20	(Denmark) High Class Racing	(Denmark) Dennis Andersen (Denmark) Anders Fjordbach (United Arab Emirates) Ed Jones (Switzerland) Raffaele Marciello	Gibson GK428 4.2 L V8	646	Accident
50 DNF	GTD; Pro	95	(United States) Turner Motorsport	(United States) Bill Auberlen (United States) John Edwards (United States) Chandler Hull (Canada) Bruno Spengler	BMW M4 GT3	635	Power Steering
50 DNF	GTD; Pro	95	(United States) Turner Motorsport	(United States) Bill Auberlen (United States) John Edwards (United States) Chandler Hull (Canada) Bruno Spengler	BMW SS58B30T0 3.0 L Turbo I6	635	Power Steering
51 DNF	LMP3	87	(United States) FastMD Racing	(United States) Nick Boulle (Japan) Yu Kanamaru (Canada) Antonio Serravalle (Canada) James Vance	Duqueine M30 - D08	618	Mechanical
51 DNF	LMP3	87	(United States) FastMD Racing	(United States) Nick Boulle (Japan) Yu Kanamaru (Canada) Antonio Serravalle (Canada) James Vance	Nissan VK56DE 5.6 L V8	618	Mechanical
52 DNF	LMP2	18	(United States) Era Motorsport	(United Kingdom) Ryan Dalziel (United Kingdom) Oliver Jarvis (United States) Dwight Merriman (Denmark) Christian Rasmussen	Oreca 07	510	Engine
52 DNF	LMP2	18	(United States) Era Motorsport	(United Kingdom) Ryan Dalziel (United Kingdom) Oliver Jarvis (United States) Dwight Merriman (Denmark) Christian Rasmussen	Gibson GK428 4.2 L V8	510	Engine
53 DNF	LMP3	36	(United States) Andretti Autosport	(United States) Jarett Andretti (Colombia) Gabby Chaves (United States) Dakota Dickerson (Sweden) Rasmus Lindh	Ligier JS P320	371	Mechanical
53 DNF	LMP3	36	(United States) Andretti Autosport	(United States) Jarett Andretti (Colombia) Gabby Chaves (United States) Dakota Dickerson (Sweden) Rasmus Lindh	Nissan VK56DE 5.6 L V8	371	Mechanical
54 DNF	LMP3	43	(Germany) MRS GT-Racing	(Mexico) Sebastián Álvarez (Singapore) Danial Frost (Portugal) Guilherme Oliveira (United States) Alex Vogel	Ligier JS P320	368	Fire
54 DNF	LMP3	43	(Germany) MRS GT-Racing	(Mexico) Sebastián Álvarez (Singapore) Danial Frost (Portugal) Guilherme Oliveira (United States) Alex Vogel	Nissan VK56DE 5.6 L V8	368	Fire
55 DNF	GTD	42	(United States) NTE Sport	(United States) Jaden Conwright (Italy) Alessio Deledda (China) Kerong Li (United States) Robert Megennis	Lamborghini Huracán GT3 Evo 2	356	Oil tank
55 DNF	GTD	42	(United States) NTE Sport	(United States) Jaden Conwright (Italy) Alessio Deledda (China) Kerong Li (United States) Robert Megennis	Lamborghini 5.2 L V10	356	Oil tank
56 DNF	GTD; Pro	62	(United States) Risi Competizione	(United Kingdom) James Calado (Italy) Alessandro Pier Guidi (Italy) Davide Rigon (Brazil) Daniel Serra	Ferrari 296 GT3	349	Floor damage
56 DNF	GTD; Pro	62	(United States) Risi Competizione	(United Kingdom) James Calado (Italy) Alessandro Pier Guidi (Italy) Davide Rigon (Brazil) Daniel Serra	Ferrari 3.0 L Turbo V6	349	Floor damage
57 DNF	GTD	92	(United States) Kelly-Moss with Riley	(Netherlands) Jeroen Bleekemolen (United States) David Brule (United States) Andrew Davis (United States) Alec Udell	Porsche 911 GT3 R (992)	278	Fire
57 DNF	GTD	92	(United States) Kelly-Moss with Riley	(Netherlands) Jeroen Bleekemolen (United States) David Brule (United States) Andrew Davis (United States) Alec Udell	Porsche 4.2 L Flat-6	278	Fire
58 DNF	LMP2	11	(France) TDS Racing	(United States) Scott Huffaker (Denmark) Mikkel Jensen (United States) Steven Thomas (Netherlands) Rinus VeeKay	Oreca 07	249	Accident damage
58 DNF	LMP2	11	(France) TDS Racing	(United States) Scott Huffaker (Denmark) Mikkel Jensen (United States) Steven Thomas (Netherlands) Rinus VeeKay	Gibson GK428 4.2 L V8	249	Accident damage
59 DNF	GTD	75	(Australia) SunEnergy1 Racing	(Australia) Kenny Habul (Zimbabwe) Axcil Jefferies (Germany) Fabian Schiller (Germany) Luca Stolz	Mercedes-AMG GT3 Evo	233	Cooling
59 DNF	GTD	75	(Australia) SunEnergy1 Racing	(Australia) Kenny Habul (Zimbabwe) Axcil Jefferies (Germany) Fabian Schiller (Germany) Luca Stolz	Mercedes-AMG M159 6.2 L V8	233	Cooling
60 DNF	LMP3	74	(United States) Riley Motorsports	(Netherlands) Glenn van Berlo (Australia) Josh Burdon (Brazil) Felipe Fraga (United States) Gar Robinson	Ligier JS P320	89	Engine
60 DNF	LMP3	74	(United States) Riley Motorsports	(Netherlands) Glenn van Berlo (Australia) Josh Burdon (Brazil) Felipe Fraga (United States) Gar Robinson	Nissan VK56DE 5.6 L V8	89	Engine
61 DNF	GTD	47	(Italy) Cetilar Racing	(Italy) Alessandro Balzan (Italy) Antonio Fuoco (Italy) Roberto Lacorte (Italy) Giorgio Sernagiotto	Ferrari 296 GT3	44	Floor damage
61 DNF	GTD	47	(Italy) Cetilar Racing	(Italy) Alessandro Balzan (Italy) Antonio Fuoco (Italy) Roberto Lacorte (Italy) Giorgio Sernagiotto	Ferrari 3.0 L Turbo V6	44	Floor damage
OFFICIAL RESULTS

== Standings after the race ==
GTP Drivers' Championship standings
Pos.	Driver	Points
1	(Portugal) Filipe Albuquerque (United States) Ricky Taylor (Switzerland) Louis Delétraz (New Zealand) Brendon Hartley	350
2	(France) Sébastien Bourdais (Netherlands) Renger van der Zande (New Zealand) Scott Dixon	328
3	(New Zealand) Earl Bamber (United Kingdom) Alex Lynn (United Kingdom) Richard Westbrook	306
4	(Brazil) Pipo Derani (United Kingdom) Alexander Sims (United Kingdom) Jack Aitken	285
5	(Austria) Philipp Eng (Brazil) Augusto Farfus (Germany) Marco Wittmann (United States) Colton Herta	274

LMP2 Drivers' Championship standings
Pos.	Driver	Points
1	(Australia) James Allen (Italy) Gianmaria Bruni (Italy) Francesco Pizzi (United States) Fred Poordad	0‡
2	(Mexico) Esteban Gutiérrez (United Kingdom) Ben Hanley (United States) George Kurtz (United States) Matt McMurry	0‡
3	(France) Julien Canal (Denmark) Nicklas Nielsen (France) François Perrodo (France) Matthieu Vaxivière	0‡
4	(Netherlands) Giedo van der Garde (France) François Heriau (United States) Josh Pierson (Netherlands) Job van Uitert	0‡
5	(Canada) John Farano (New Zealand) Scott McLaughlin (Barbados) Kyffin Simpson (United States) Josef Newgarden	0‡

LMP3 Drivers' Championship standings
Pos.	Driver	Points
1	(United Kingdom) Wayne Boyd (Canada) Anthony Mantella (Argentina) Nicolás Varrone (United States) Thomas Merrill	0‡
2	(Portugal) João Barbosa (Chile) Nico Pino (United States) Lance Willsey (United States) Nolan Siegel	0‡
3	(United States) Christopher Allen (United States) Connor Bloum (United States) John De Angelis (Australia) Cameron Shields	0‡
4	(United Kingdom) Matt Bell (Canada) Orey Fidani (Germany) Lars Kern (Germany) Moritz Kranz	0‡
5	(United Kingdom) Till Bechtolsheimer (Netherlands) Tijmen van der Helm (United States) Mason Filippi (United States) Luca Mars	0‡

GTD Pro Drivers' Championship standings
Pos.	Driver	Points
1	(Andorra) Jules Gounon (Spain) Daniel Juncadella (Germany) Maro Engel (United States) Cooper MacNeil	385
2	(Spain) Antonio García (United States) Jordan Taylor (United States) Tommy Milner	348
3	(United Kingdom) Ben Barnicoat (United Kingdom) Jack Hawksworth (United Kingdom) Mike Conway	330
4	(France) Romain Grosjean (South Africa) Jordan Pepper (Italy) Mirko Bortolotti (Italy) Andrea Caldarelli	306
5	(Austria) Klaus Bachler (France) Patrick Pilet (Belgium) Laurens Vanthoor	284

GTD Drivers' Championship standings
Pos.	Driver	Points
1	(Canada) Roman De Angelis (Denmark) Marco Sørensen (United Kingdom) Ian James (United Kingdom) Darren Turner	375
2	(United States) Andy Lally (United States) John Potter (United States) Spencer Pumpelly (Denmark) Nicki Thiim	340
3	(United States) Brendan Iribe (Denmark) Frederik Schandorff (United Kingdom) Ollie Millroy (Germany) Marvin Kirchhöfer	326
4	(United Kingdom) Katherine Legge (United States) Sheena Monk (United States) Marc Miller (Germany) Mario Farnbacher	308
5	(United States) Frankie Montecalvo (United States) Aaron Telitz (Canada) Parker Thompson (United States) Kyle Kirkwood	284

- Note: Only the top five positions are included for all sets of standings.
- ‡: Points only awarded towards Michelin Endurance Cup championship.

GTP Teams' Championship standings
Pos.	Team	Points
1	(United States) #10 WTR with Andretti Autosport	350
2	(United States) #01 Cadillac Racing	328
3	(United States) #02 Cadillac Racing	306
4	(United States) #31 Whelen Engineering Racing	285
5	(United States) #24 BMW M Team RLL	274

LMP2 Teams' Championship standings
Pos.	Team	Points
1	(Germany) #55 Proton Competition	0‡
2	(United States) #04 CrowdStrike Racing by APR	0‡
3	(Italy) #88 AF Corse	0‡
4	(France) #35 TDS Racing	0‡
5	(United States) #8 Tower Motorsports	0‡

LMP3 Teams' Championship standings
Pos.	Team	Points
1	(Canada) #17 AWA	0‡
2	(United States) #33 Sean Creech Motorsport	0‡
3	(United States) #38 Performance Tech Motorsports	0‡
4	(Canada) #13 AWA	0‡
5	(United States) #85 JDC-Miller MotorSports	0‡

GTD Pro Teams' Championship standings
Pos.	Team	Points
1	(United States) #79 WeatherTech Racing	385
2	(United States) #3 Corvette Racing	348
3	(United States) #14 Vasser Sullivan Racing	330
4	(Italy) #63 Iron Lynx	306
5	(Canada) #9 Pfaff Motorsports	284

GTD Teams' Championship standings
Pos.	Team	Points
1	(United States) #27 Heart of Racing Team	375
2	(United States) #44 Magnus Racing	340
3	(United Kingdom) #70 Inception Racing	326
4	(United States) #66 Gradient Racing	308
5	(United States) #12 Vasser Sullivan Racing	284

- Note: Only the top five positions are included for all sets of standings.
- ‡: Points only awarded towards Michelin Endurance Cup championship.

GTP Manufacturers' Championship standings
Pos.	Manufacturer	Points
1	(Japan) Acura	385
2	(United States) Cadillac	350
3	(Germany) BMW	328
4	(Germany) Porsche	312

GTD Pro Manufacturers' Championship standings
Pos.	Manufacturer	Points
1	(Germany) Mercedes-AMG	385
2	(United States) Chevrolet	348
3	(Japan) Lexus	330
4	(Italy) Lamborghini	306
5	(Germany) Porsche	284

GTD Manufacturers' Championship standings
Pos.	Manufacturer	Points
1	(United Kingdom) Aston Martin	378
2	(United Kingdom) McLaren	350
3	(Japan) Acura	332
4	(Japan) Lexus	306
5	(Italy) Lamborghini	282

- Note: Only the top five positions are included for all sets of standings.

IMSA SportsCar Championship
Previous race: none	2023 season	Next race: 12 Hours of Sebring
