= Toyota G16E engine =

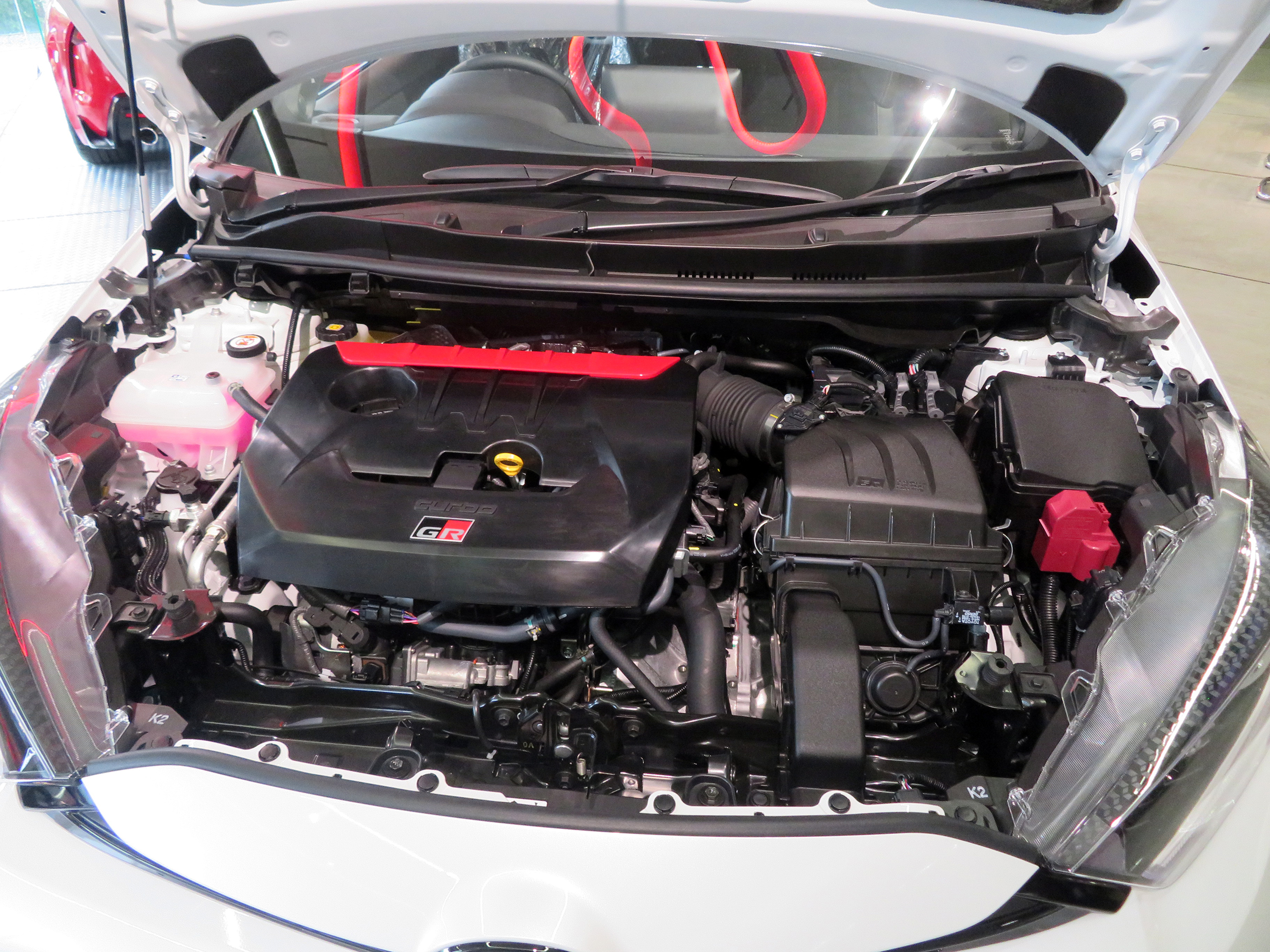
- Toyota's G16E-GTS engine installed in the 2020 GR Yaris

Overview
- Manufacturer: Toyota
- Production: 2020–present

Layout
- Configuration: Inline-3
- Displacement: 1,618 cc (99 cu in)
- Cylinder bore: 87.5 mm (3.445 in)
- Piston stroke: 89.7 mm (3.531 in)
- Cylinder block material: Aluminium alloy
- Cylinder head material: Aluminium alloy
- Valvetrain: DOHC, 4 valves per cylinder
- Compression ratio: 10.5:1

Combustion
- Turbocharger: IHI VB43 or VB50 single-scroll ball bearing
- Fuel system: D-4ST combined gasoline direct and indirect multi-point electronic injection
- Management: Denso
- Fuel type: Petrol with sustainable fuel blend option or full-sustainable fuel (Ethanol or eFuel) by Esso/Mobil/Exxon
- Oil system: Dry sump, lubricants supplied by Mobil 1
- Cooling system: Intercooled single water pump with all cooling and radiator components supplied by Denso

Output
- Power output: 192–224 kW (257–300 hp; 261–305 PS)
- Specific power: 118.7–138.4 kW (159–186 hp; 161–188 PS) per litre
- Torque output: 360–415 N⋅m (266–306 lb⋅ft)

Dimensions
- Dry weight: 240 lb (109 kg) - no headers, clutch, ECU, spark box or filters

The Toyota G16E engine is a 1,618 cc (98.7 cu in) straight-three engine built by Toyota under its Gazoo Racing division that was first introduced in January 2020 for the GR Yaris as a member of the Toyota Dynamic Force engine family.

== Models ==
Series	Model	Applications	Vehicle model code	Power	Torque	Years	Notes
G16E	G16E-GTS	GR Yaris	GXPA16	Pre-facelift: Japan, Australia, Argentina, and New Zealand: 200 kW (268 hp; 272 PS) at 6,500 rpm Europe, Thailand, Malaysia, Indonesia, Singapore, Philippines, Mexico, and Taiwan: 192 kW (257 hp; 261 PS) at 6,500 rpm Facelift: Japan and Indonesia: 224 kW (300 hp; 305 PS) at 6,500 rpm Europe: 206 kW (276 hp; 280 PS) at 6,500 rpm	Pre-facelift: Japan, Australia, Argentina, and New Zealand: 370 N⋅m (273 lb⋅ft) at 3,000–4,600 rpm Europe, Thailand, Malaysia, Indonesia, Singapore, Philippines, Mexico and Taiwan: 360 N⋅m (266 lb⋅ft) at 3,000–4,600 rpm GRMN Yaris/Morizo Selection: 390 N⋅m (288 lb⋅ft) at 3,000–4,600 rpm/3,200–4,000 rpm Facelift: Japan and Indonesia: 400 N⋅m (295 lb⋅ft) at 3,250–4,600 rpm Europe: 390 N⋅m (288 lb⋅ft) at 3,250–4,600 rpm	2020–present	Available in RZ and RC grades in Japan
G16E	G16E-GTS	GR Corolla	GZEA14	Japan and North America: 224 kW (300 hp; 305 PS) at 6,500 rpm Australia, Thailand, Malaysia and Indonesia: 220 kW (295 hp; 299 PS) at 6,500 rpm	Regular model: 370 N⋅m (273 lb⋅ft) at 3,000–5,550 rpm Morizo Edition/Facelift: 400 N⋅m (295 lb⋅ft) at 3,250–4,600 rpm GRMN Corolla: 408–415 N⋅m (301–306 lb⋅ft) at 3,250–4,600 rpm	2022–present	
G16E	G16E-GTS	Lexus LBX Morizo RR	GAYA16	Japan: 224 kW (300 hp; 305 PS) at 6,500 rpm Australia: 206 kW (276 hp; 280 PS) at 6,500 rpm	Japan: 400 N⋅m (295 lb⋅ft) at 3,250–4,600 rpm Australia: 390 N⋅m (288 lb⋅ft) at 3,250–4,600 rpm	2024–present	

=== G16E-GTS ===
The G16E-GTS is a turbocharged engine model with 10.5:1 compression ratio and D-4ST direct/port injection system with multi-oil jet piston cooling, large-diameter exhaust valves and a part-machined intake port. The turbo boost is set between 1.4 and 1.81 bar (20.3 and 26.3 psi). With the engine producing up to 224 kW (300 hp; 305 PS) (which comes out to 138.4 kW, 186 hp, 188 PS per litre), it makes the engine one of the most powerful three-cylinder automobile engines ever produced. The engine also has the highest specific output of any Toyota road car engine, exceeding the 95.6 kW (128 hp; 130 PS) per litre specific output from the 191 kW (256 hp; 260 PS) 2.0-litre 3S-GTE engine used in the ST246 Caldina GT-Four.

==== Applications ====
- 2020–present GR Yaris (GXPA16)
- 2022–present GR Corolla (GZEA14)
- 2024–present Lexus LBX Morizo RR (GAYA16)

==== Turbocharger specs (IHI VB43) ====
- Compressor inducer: 42.29 mm (1.66 in)
- Compressor exducer: 56.07 mm (2.21 in)
- Turbine inducer: 53.02 mm (2.09 in)
- Turbine exducer: 42.99 mm (1.69 in)

=== Hydrogen version ===
In 2021, Toyota modified the G16E-GTS engine to run exclusively on hydrogen fuel. The modified engine ran in the 2021–2022 Super Taikyu series. Toyota has tried to establish hydrogen as a zero-emission fuel alternative to petrol in motorsport and for daily use. In 2023, Toyota showcased its Corolla Cross H2 concept vehicle which used the hydrogen-fueled G16E-GTS engine.

=== Others ===
A de-stroked variation of the G16E-GTS engine with a displacement of 1.4 L (85.4 cu in), which is compatible with synthetic fuel, is used by the GR86 for the 2022 Super Taikyu series. The stroke was reduced from 89.7 to 77 mm (3.53 to 3.03 in).

== See also ==
- List of Toyota engines
