= Toyota GR Yaris =

Performance-oriented variant of the Toyota Yaris

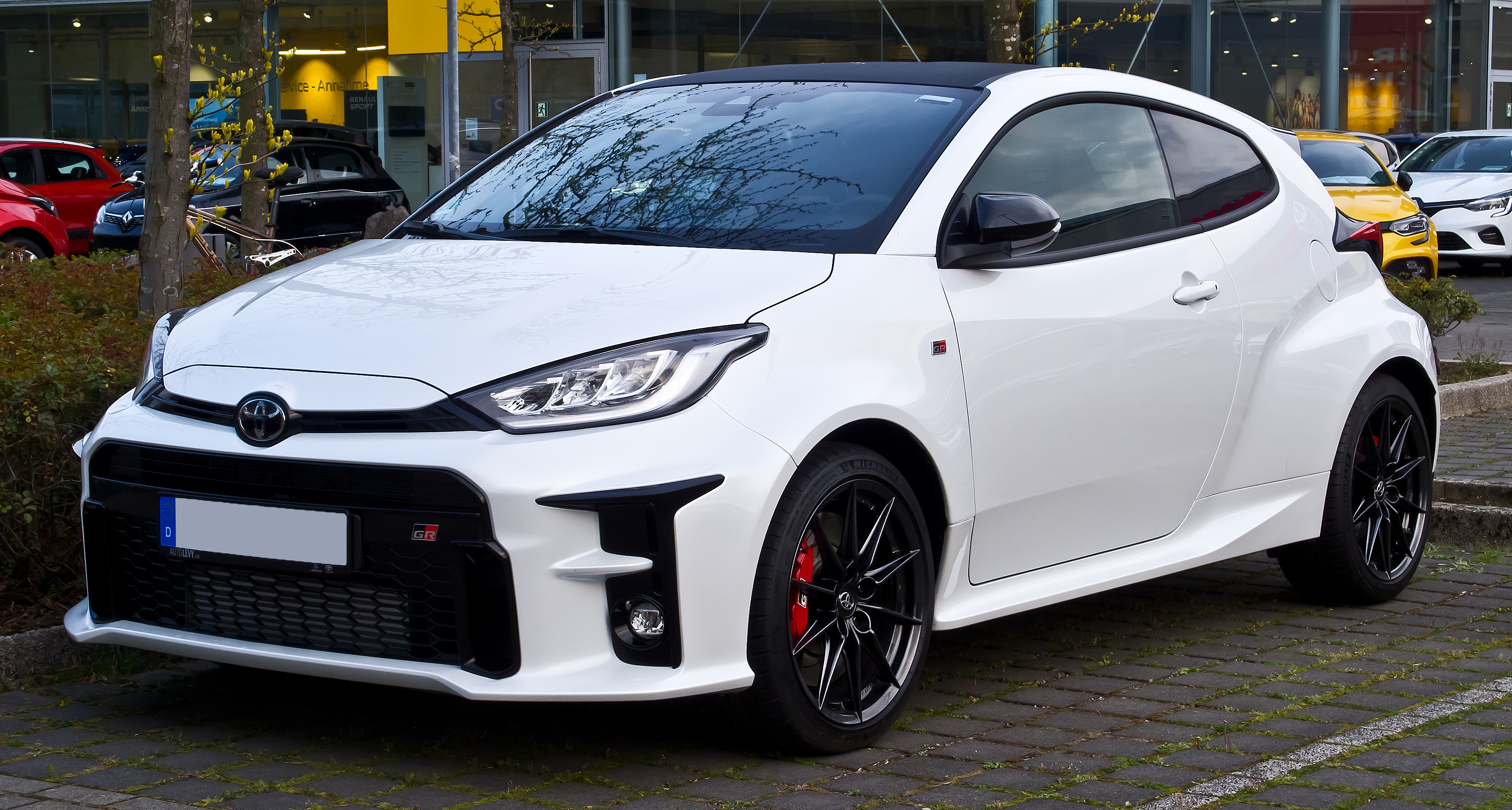
- 2021 Toyota GR Yaris (GXPA16, Germany)

Overview
- Manufacturer: Toyota
- Model code: XP210
- Production: September 2020 – present
- Assembly: Japan: Toyota, Aichi (Motomachi plant)
- Designer: Shota Ito, Takeo Okuno and Cho Byung-kang

Body and chassis
- Class: Hot hatch / supermini (B)
- Body style: 3-door hatchback
- Layout: Front-engine, four-wheel-drive; Front-engine, front-wheel-drive (RS, 2020-2024)
- Platform: TNGA: GA-B (front)/GA-C (rear)
- Related: Toyota Yaris (XP210); Toyota GR Corolla

Powertrain
- Engine: Petrol: 1618 cc G16E-GTS turbo I3 (GXPA16); 1490 cc M15A-FKS I3 (MXPA12; RS)
- Power output: 192–224 kW (257–300 hp; 261–305 PS); 88 kW (118 hp; 120 PS) (RS)
- Transmission: 6-speed EA67F manual; 8-speed "GR-DAT" automatic (2024–present); K120 CVT with physical first gear (RS)

Dimensions
- Wheelbase: 2,560 mm (100.8 in)
- Length: 3,995 mm (157.3 in); 4,030 mm (158.7 in) (GRMN Yaris)
- Width: 1,805 mm (71.1 in); 1,815 mm (71.5 in) (GRMN Yaris)
- Height: 1,455 mm (57.3 in); 1,475 mm (58.1 in) (GRMN Yaris)
- Kerb weight: 1,110–1,280 kg (2,447–2,822 lb)

Chronology
- Predecessor: Toyota Vitz/Yaris GRMN (Japan/Europe); Toyota Vitz RS (Japan, RS)

The Toyota GR Yaris (Japanese: トヨタ・GRヤリス, Hepburn: Toyota Jīāru Yarisu) is a sport compact car manufactured since 2020 by Toyota with assistance from the company's Gazoo Racing (GR) division. It is a three-door hatchback which was designed to meet World Rally Championship (WRC) homologation rules. The GR Yaris is available with four-wheel drive alongside other significant modifications which differentiate it from the five-door XP210-series Yaris, with the rear of the car being based upon the larger E210-series Corolla.

== Overview ==
When the XP210 Yaris hatchback was developed, Toyota decided to only offer it in a five-door bodywork, as three-door hatchbacks had been diminishing in popularity. While the decision made financial sense, it posed a problem for Toyota's WRC team, which felt only a three-door hatch was suitable for competition.

Despite the expense of developing a limited-production performance model, Toyota CEO Akio Toyoda felt strongly that it was important for the company to still be represented at the WRC, so he authorised the development of the GR Yaris. Toyoda would later say that he saw the GR Yaris as a passion project of his, stemming from a desire for the automaker to develop and build a sports car purely of its own design, unlike the 86 (jointly developed with and built by Subaru) or the GR Supra (jointly developed with BMW and built by Magna Steyr).

=== Design ===
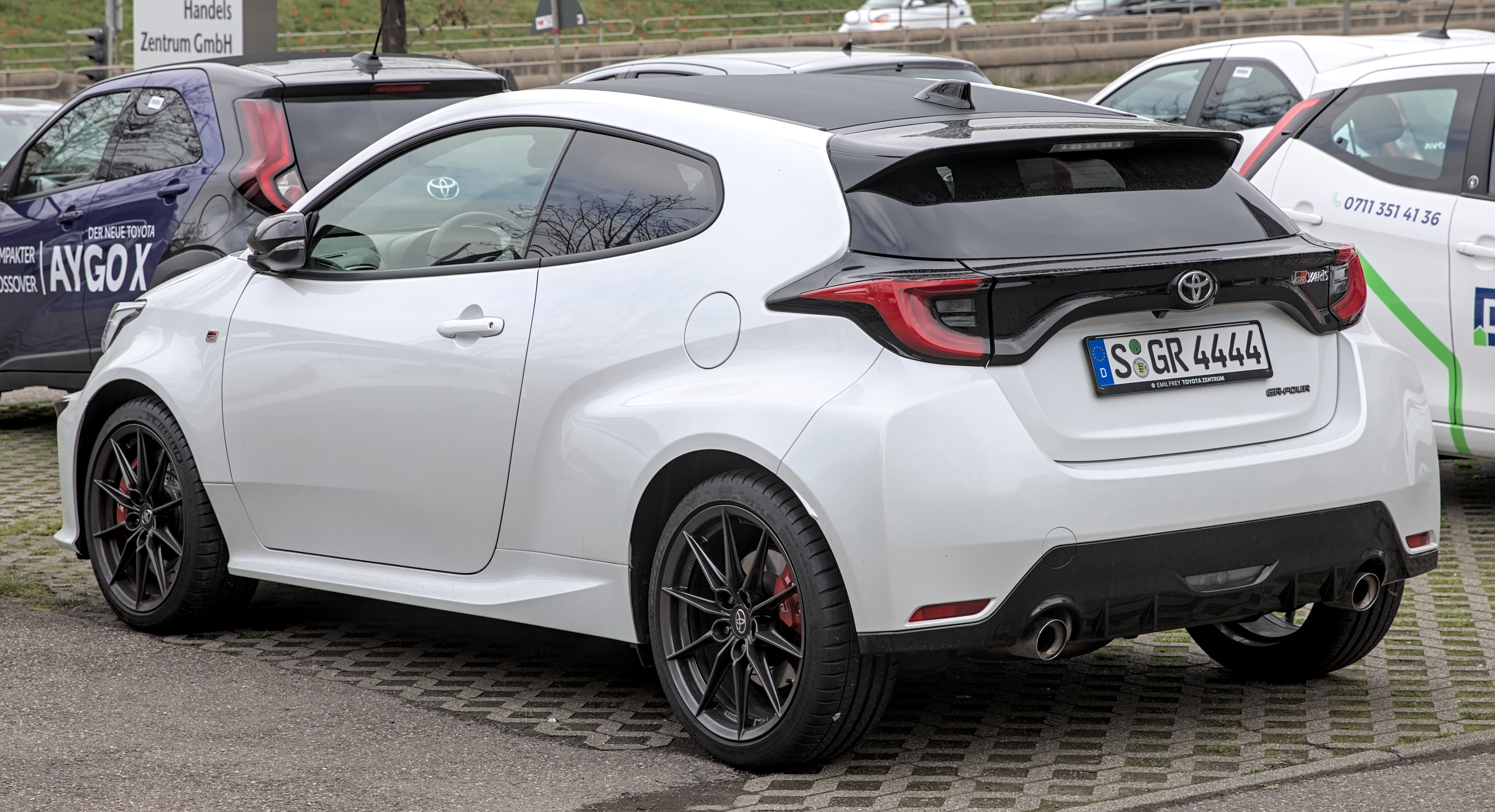
Rear view

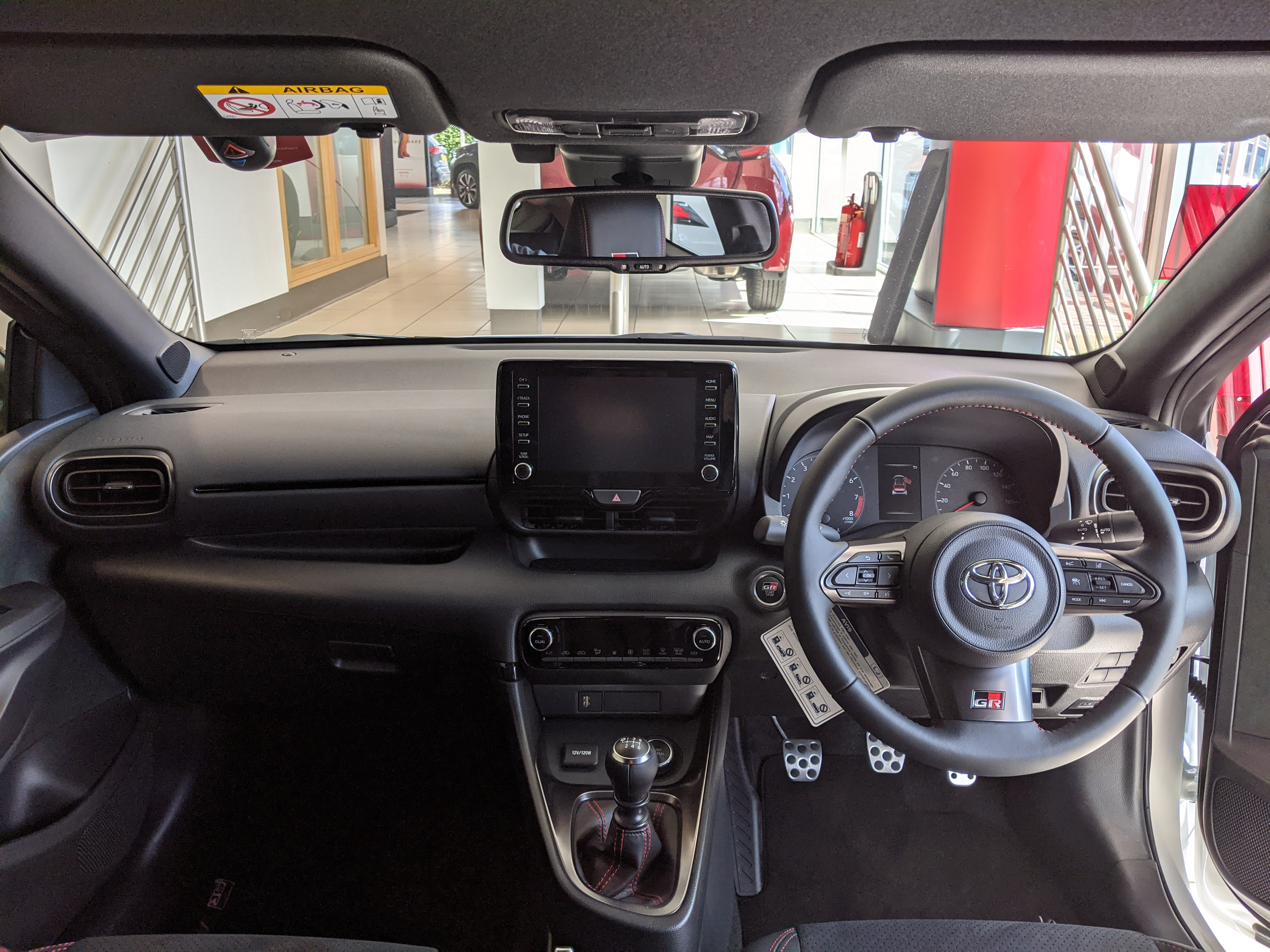
Interior

To meet the WRC's homologation rules Toyota would need to produce at least 2,500 units of the GR Yaris in a continuous 12-month period, although this is claimed to be 25,000 by Toyota. Rally cars homologated for the WRC are required to use the same basic bodyshell as a production car and the standard XP210 series Yaris is only available with a five-door body which Toyota and Toyoda felt wasn't appropriate. The Gazoo Racing WRT team, led by team principal and 4-time WRC champion Tommi Mäkinen, was heavily involved in the design. The challenge was to build a car that was capable of being equipped to race at WRC events, but also suitable for daily driving.

Working together with the rally team, the Gazoo Racing division built prototypes and development mules by heavily modifying production Yaris vehicles that were then reverse-engineered into a car that would work for the average customer. Both Toyoda and Mäkinen spent time test driving these development mules and pre-production cars in the snow, on gravel and on the street.

One of the major changes came when the team decided they wanted the three-door hatchback to have four-wheel drive, a wider rear track and a double wishbone suspension layout to handle significantly increased torque. The design changes required that the GR Yaris be built on a combination between the front end of the standard Yaris' GA-B architecture with the rear of the GA-C platform used by the Corolla, among other Toyota products. To save weight, the GR Yaris also uses aluminium for the front bonnet, boot lid and door panels. It also uses carbon fibre-reinforced plastic for its roof panel which was formed using the sheet moulding compound method. Ultimately, chief engineer Naohiko Saito said he was able to accommodate 90 percent of design requests made by Mäkinen and the WRC team.

The production car is powered by a Gazoo Racing-built, turbocharged and direct/port-injected 1.6-litre G16E-GTS three-cylinder engine that produces 192–200 kW (257–268 hp; 261–272 PS) and 360–370 N⋅m (266–273 lb⋅ft) of torque, varying due to emissions regulations in certain markets. The engine is mated to a 6-speed V16-series intelligent manual transmission ("iMT") and "GR-Four" permanent four-wheel drive system. It has a claimed 0–100 km/h (0–62 mph) acceleration in 5.2–5.5 seconds and an electronically limited top speed of 230 km/h (143 mph).

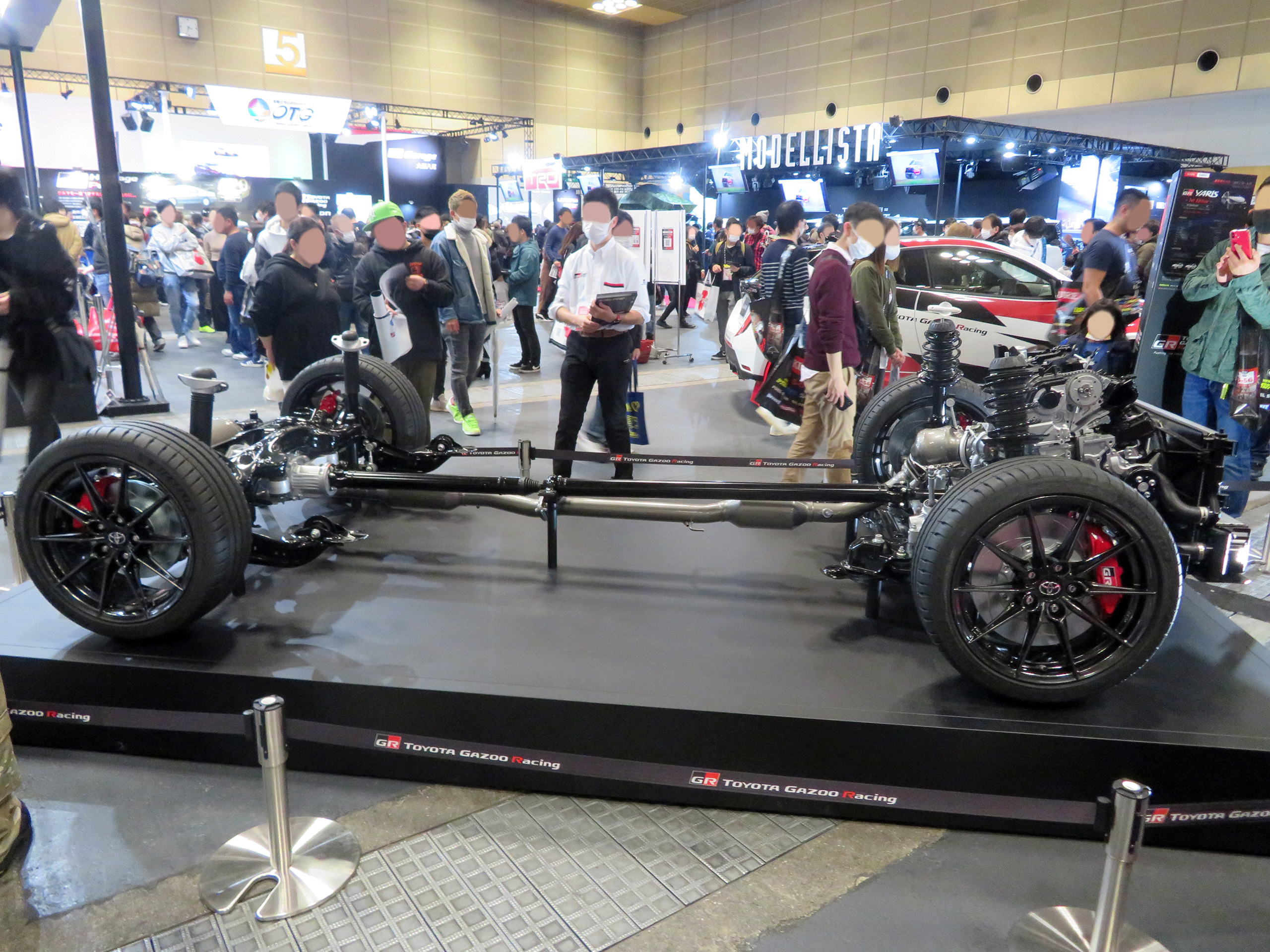
Drivetrain of GR Yaris 1.6 models

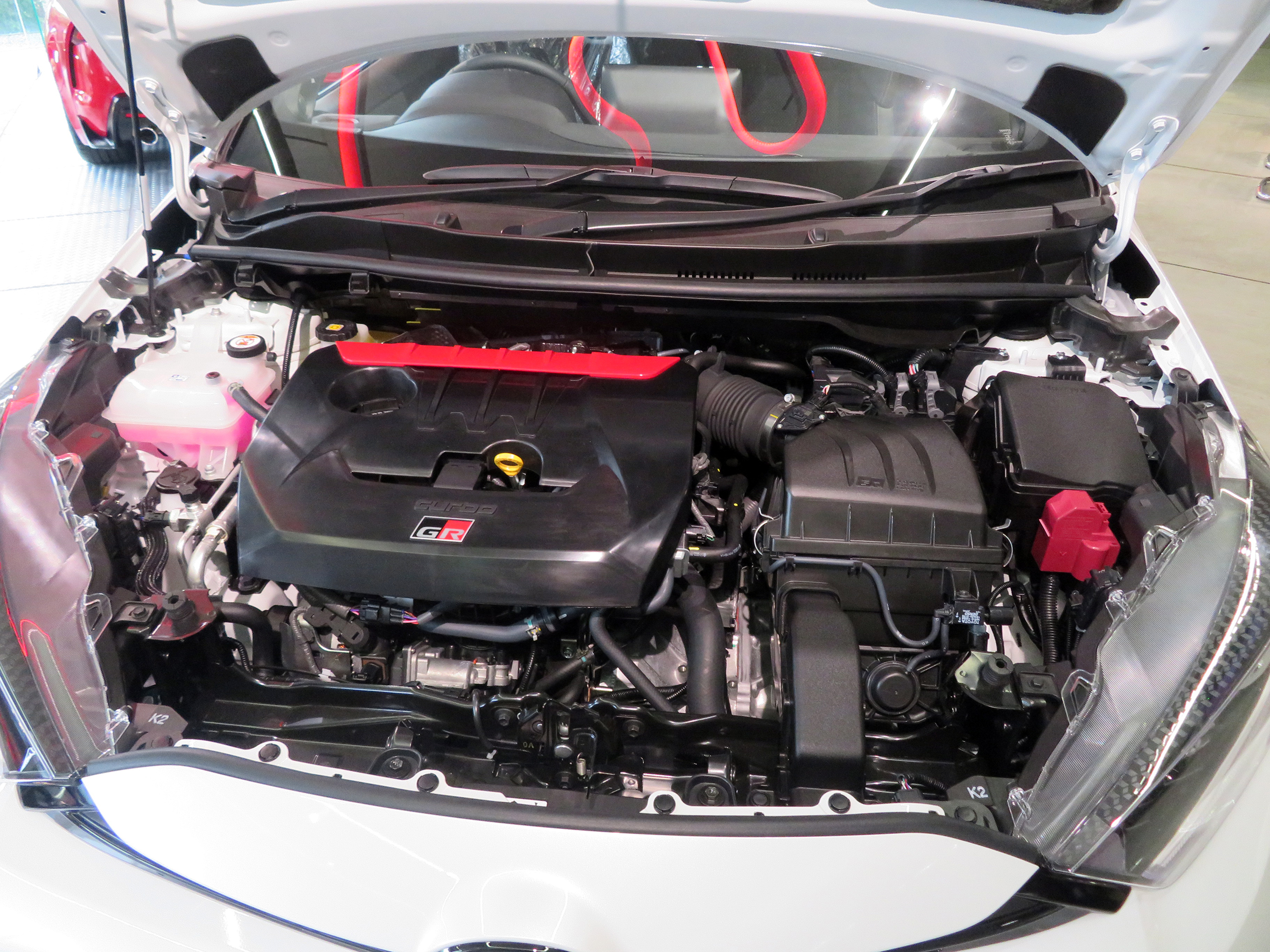
G16E-GTS engine of the GR Yaris

The GR Yaris was unveiled at the 2020 Tokyo Auto Salon, and is sold in Japan, Europe, Australia, New Zealand, South Africa, Thailand, Malaysia, Indonesia, Singapore, the Philippines, Mexico, Argentina, Taiwan and Middle East.

The GR Yaris has not been offered in the United States or Canada; analysts attribute this to its low probable sales volume, the discontinuation of the standard Yaris in these markets, and a lack of commonality with the most recent Yaris sold in the region, which was a rebadged and slightly restyled Mazda2. Both regions received the larger, five-door GR Corolla in 2022 for the 2023 model year instead.

== GR Yaris RS ==
Exclusive for the Japanese market, Toyota offers an entry-level, front-wheel drive GR Yaris RS. As it lacks the four-wheel drive system, the "GR-Four" emblem is eliminated, but otherwise the exterior bodywork of the RS is identical to the standard RZ trim level. Under the bonnet, the GR-built engine is replaced with a more regular Dynamic Force engine, the three-cylinder, naturally-aspirated, 1.5-litre, 88 kW (118 hp; 120 PS) M15A-FKS, which is mated to the K120 "Direct Shift" continuously variable transmission (CVT). The Direct Shift CVT includes a physical first gear (known as a "launch gear") and nine additional simulated gears, for a total of ten. The RS also uses the braking system found in the regular Yaris models. However, the rear double wishbone suspension system is retained. Weighing 1,130 kg (2,491 lb), it is 150 kg (331 lb) lighter than the RZ trim and the international GR Yaris model, which weighs 1,280 kg (2,822 lb).

In April 2022, the "Light Package" variant went on sale, which further reduced weight to 1,110 kg (2,447 lb). It was discontinued, when the facelift version was launched and replaced by the RC in January 2024.

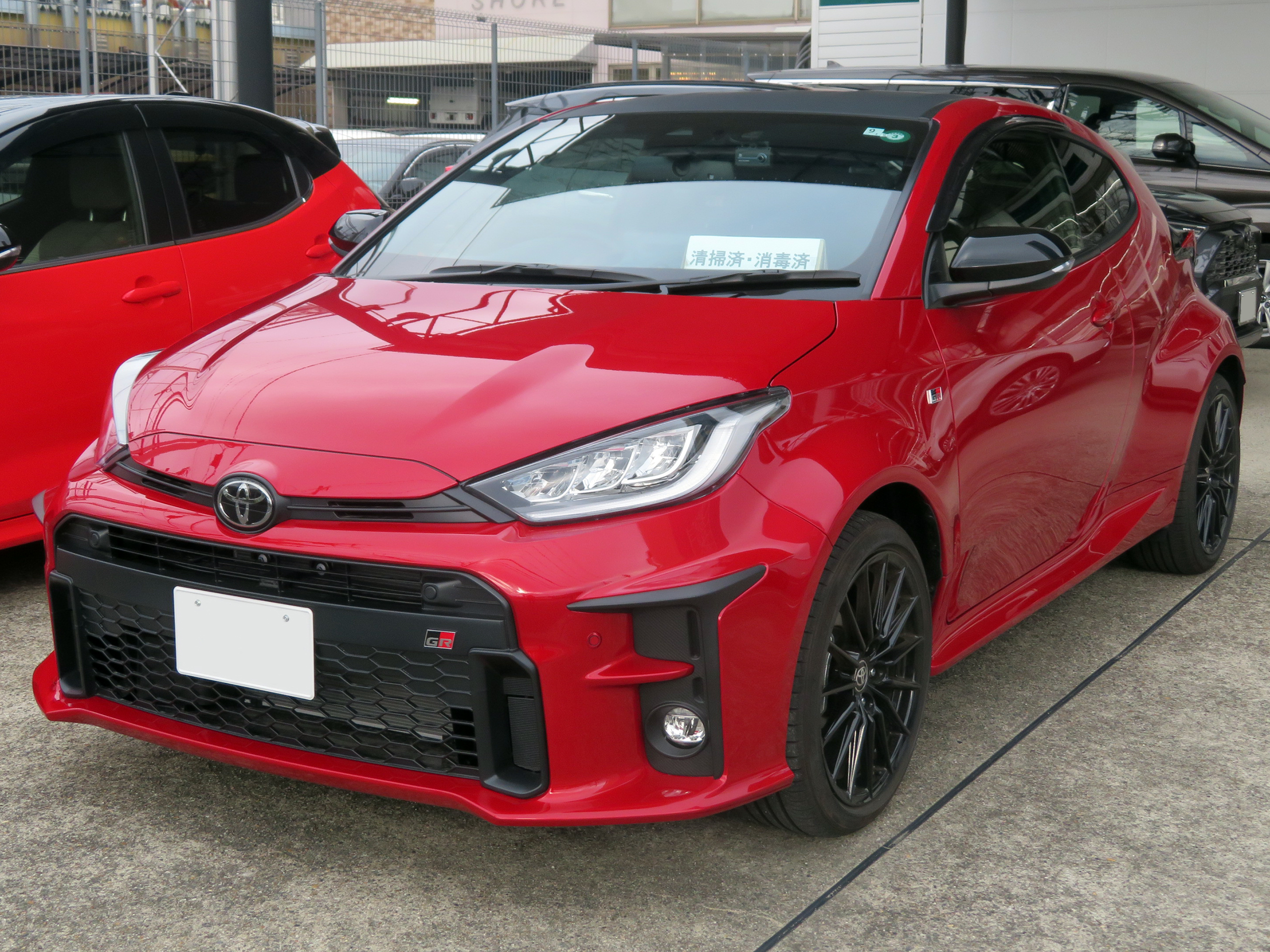
GR Yaris RS (MXPA12, Japan)

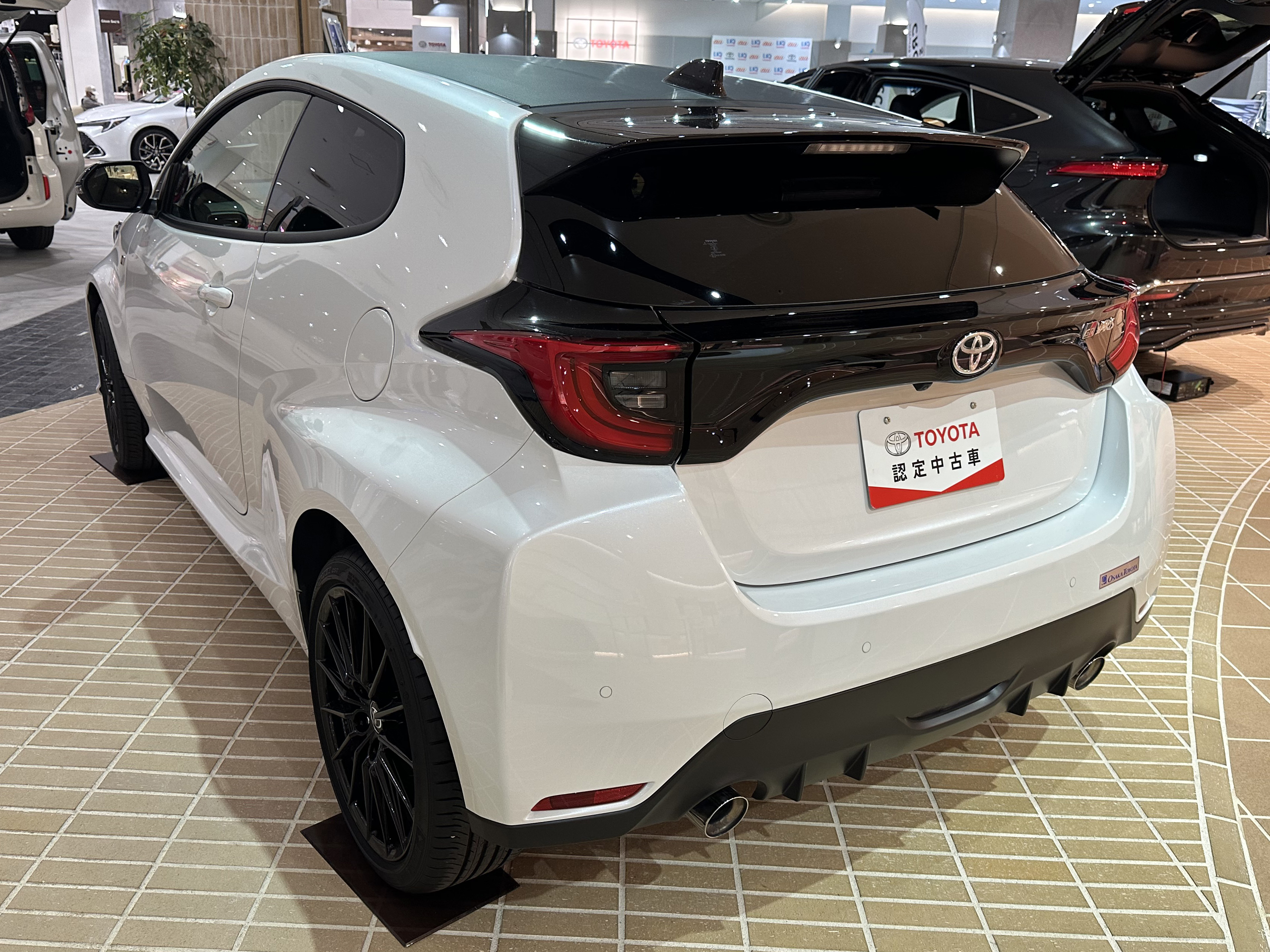
GR Yaris RS (MXPA12, Japan), note the lack of "GR-Four" badging

=== GR Yaris RC (2024-present) ===
Since the facelift variant was launched, the RC replaced the outgoing RS grade. The RC grade is intended as a base vehicle for competition vehicles, and it is lightweight without comfort features such as air conditioning, nagivation system, and audio system and uses halogen headlights. The RC variant only have body colour available was "Super White II".

Initially, the safety driving system "Toyota Safety Sense" was not available, but it became standard equipment for all models in mid-2025.

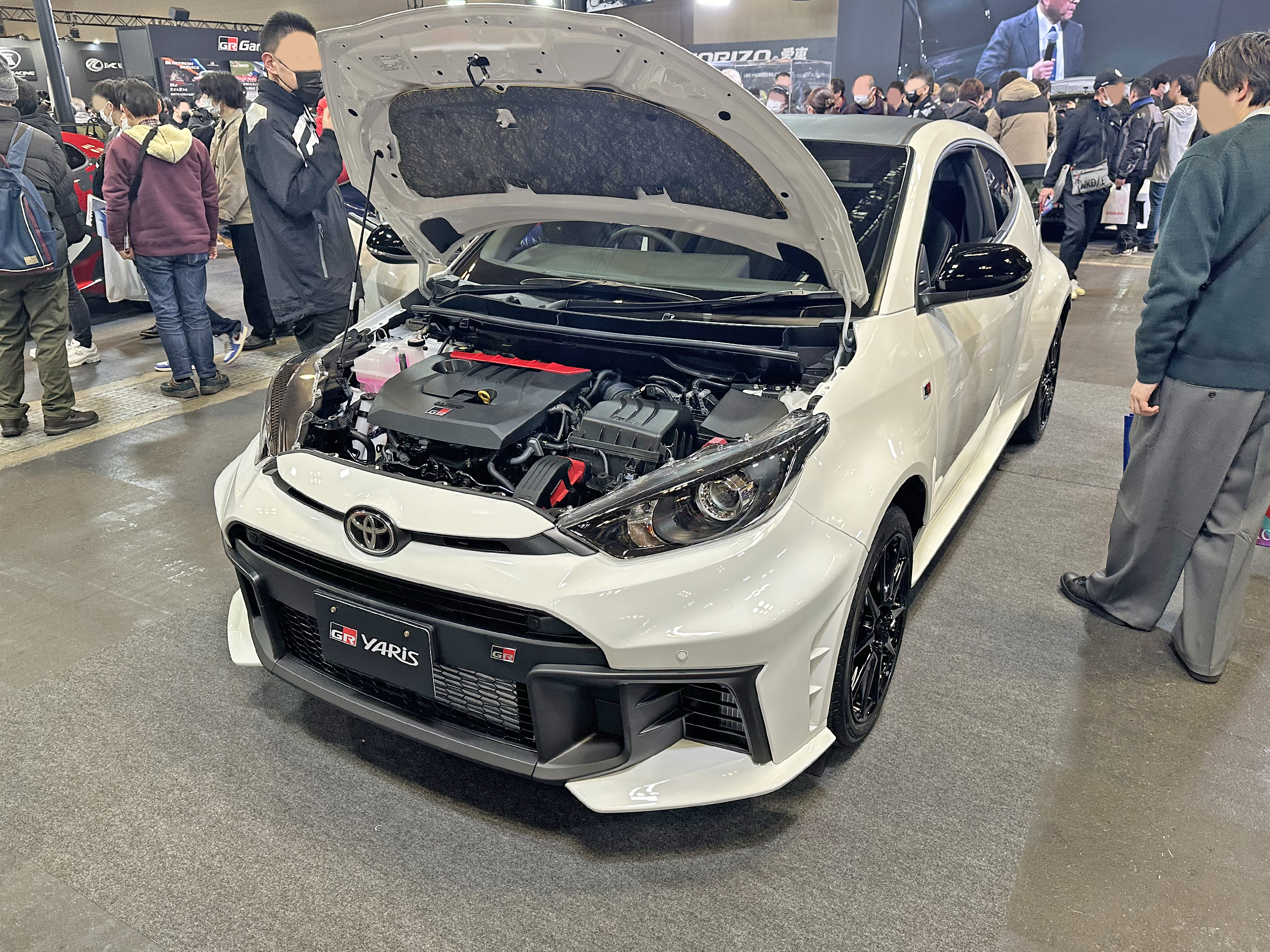
2024 GR Yaris RC

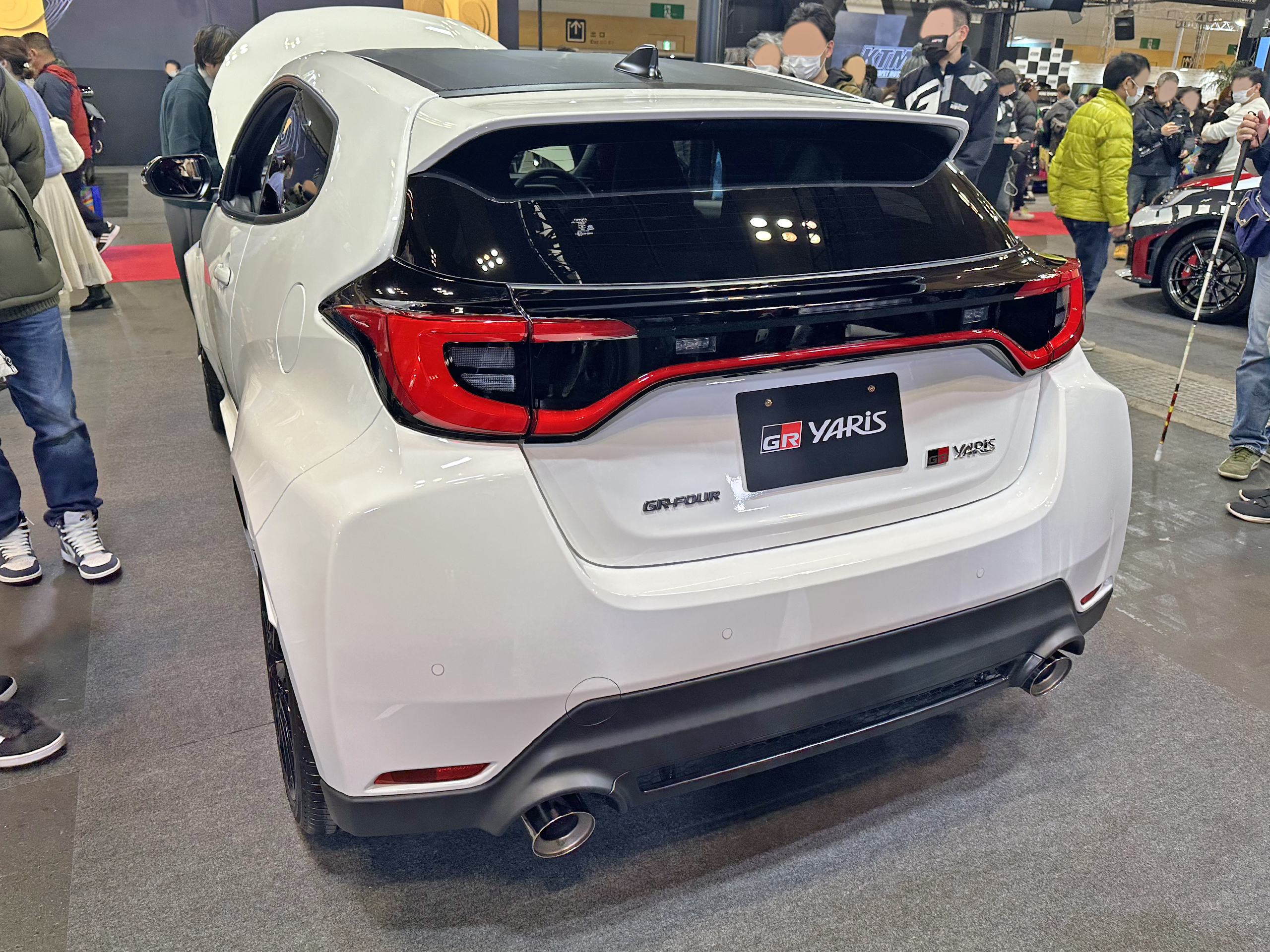
2024 GR Yaris RC

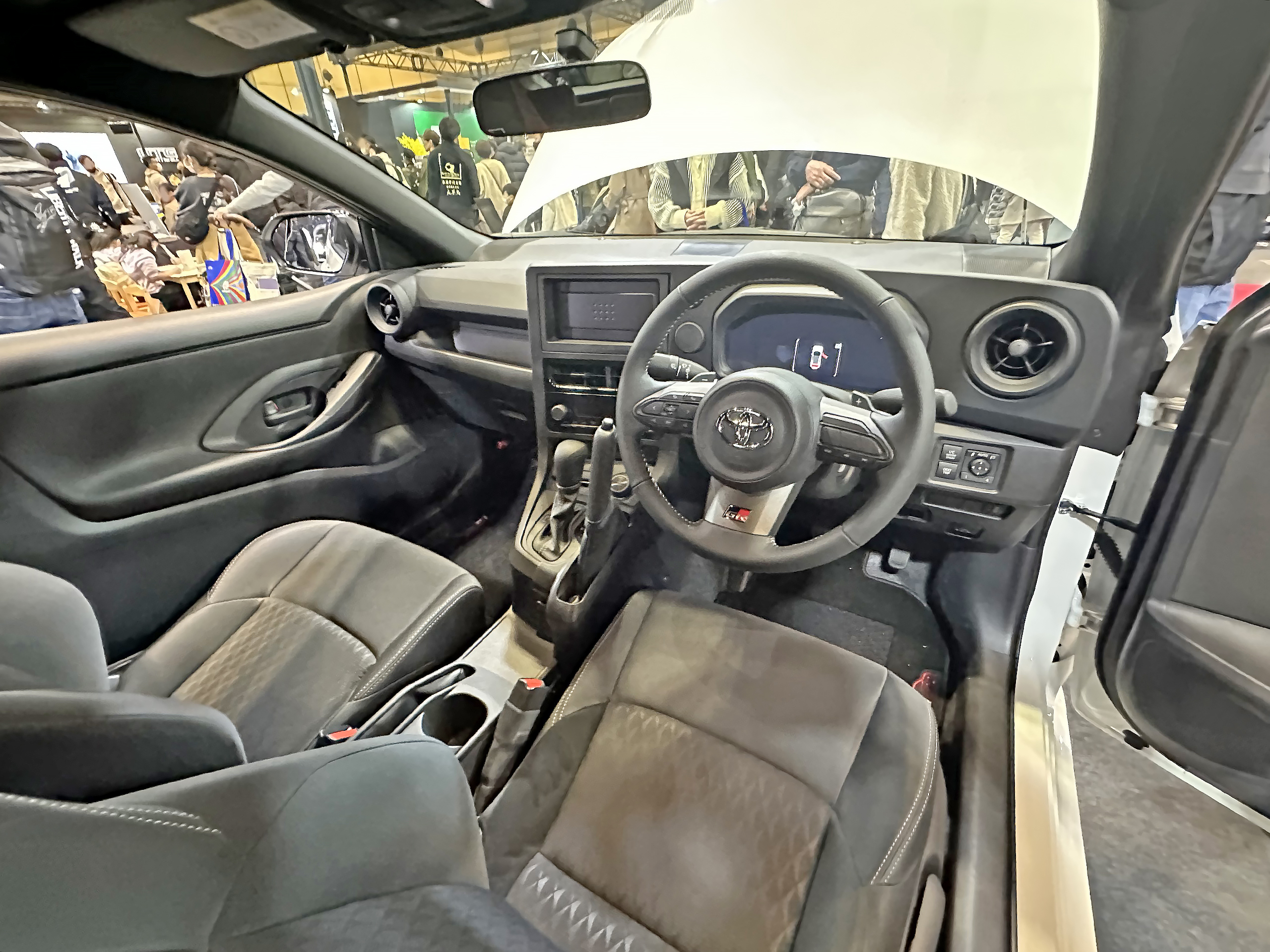
GR Yaris RC interior

== 2024 facelift ==
On 12 January 2024 at the Tokyo Auto Salon, the car received a facelift and for the first time Toyota included an 8-speed automatic option and also Formula One-style paddle-shifters for semi-automatic mode. The 1.6-litre G16E-GTS three-cylinder is upgraded to produce 224 kW (300 hp; 305 PS) and 400 N⋅m (295 lb⋅ft) of torque for the Japanese market model, on par with the GR Corolla. Engine upgrades also include "strengthened" valvetrain, a new undisclosed exhaust valve material, an increase in direct injection pressure, a new intake air pressure sensor, and redesigned lightweight pistons. The body rigidity and suspension are improved to support the power increase. The dashboard was reworked with a more driver-centric design, differentiating it from the standard Yaris. GR-Four are now standard for all models.

The GR Yaris facelift is set to commence production for the Australian market in late 2024 with showroom deliveries arriving in early 2025.

The GR Yaris facelift was launched in Indonesia in GIIAS 2024. It was launched in Thailand on 28 November 2024, alongside with Brunei on 3 January 2025and Malaysia on 5 January 2025. In 2025, the GR Yaris was launched for in the Chinese market.

In Japan, the Aero performance package was added in October 2025. It is available as a package option for the RC and RZ "High Performance". It is equipped with an aluminium bonnet with ducts, a front lip spoiler, fender ducts, a fuel tank undercover, a variable rear wing, and a rear bumper duct.

The GR Yaris facelift was unveiled in the Middle East on 16 December 2025. It is available with an Aero Performance Package.

In March 2026, the GR Yaris got minor changes such as a new steering wheel, changes to the electric power steering system and shock absorber settings. Toyota also started offering a vertical parking brake, located close to the steering wheel, as a factory-installed option on the RC trim level.

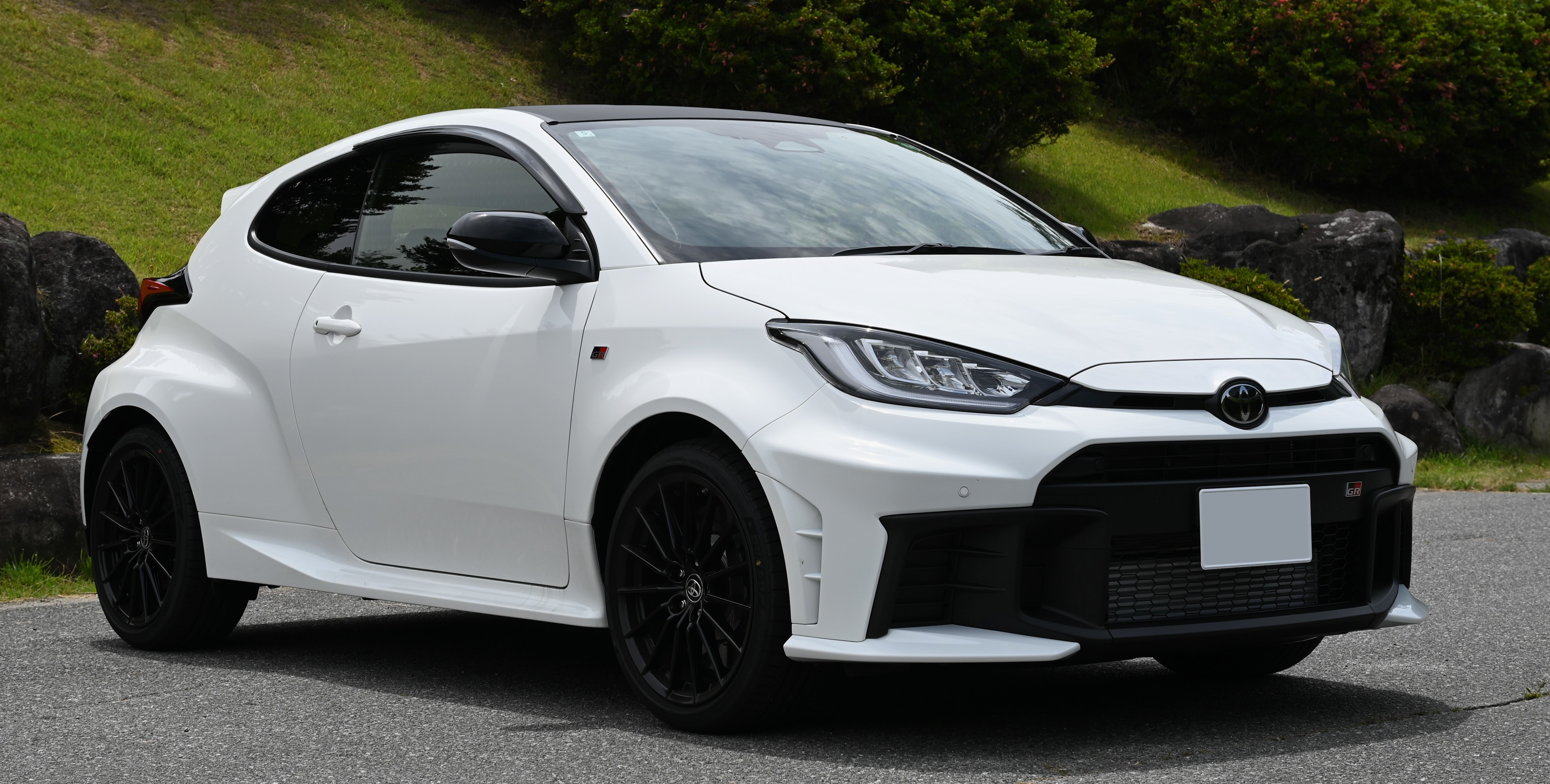
GR Yaris RZ (2024 facelift)

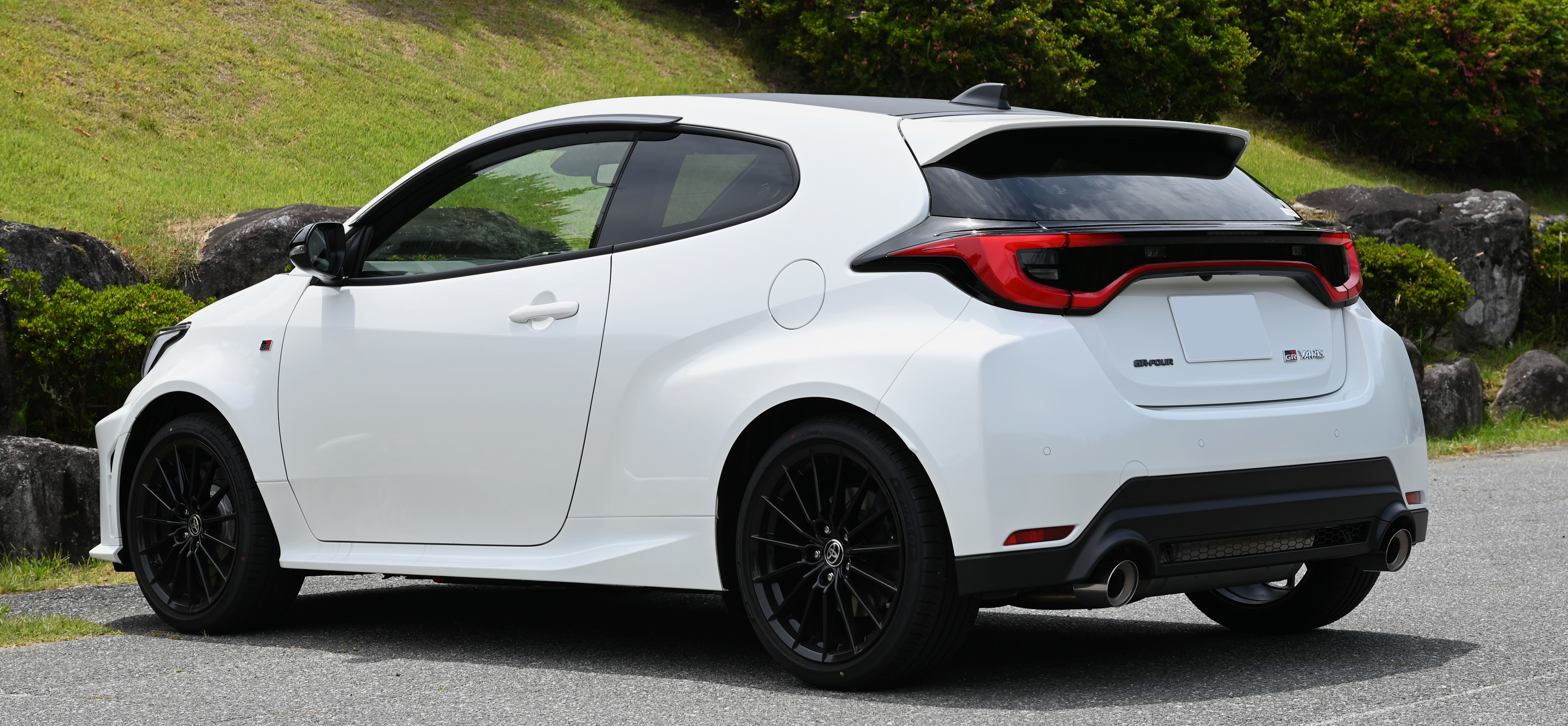
Rear view (2024 facelift)

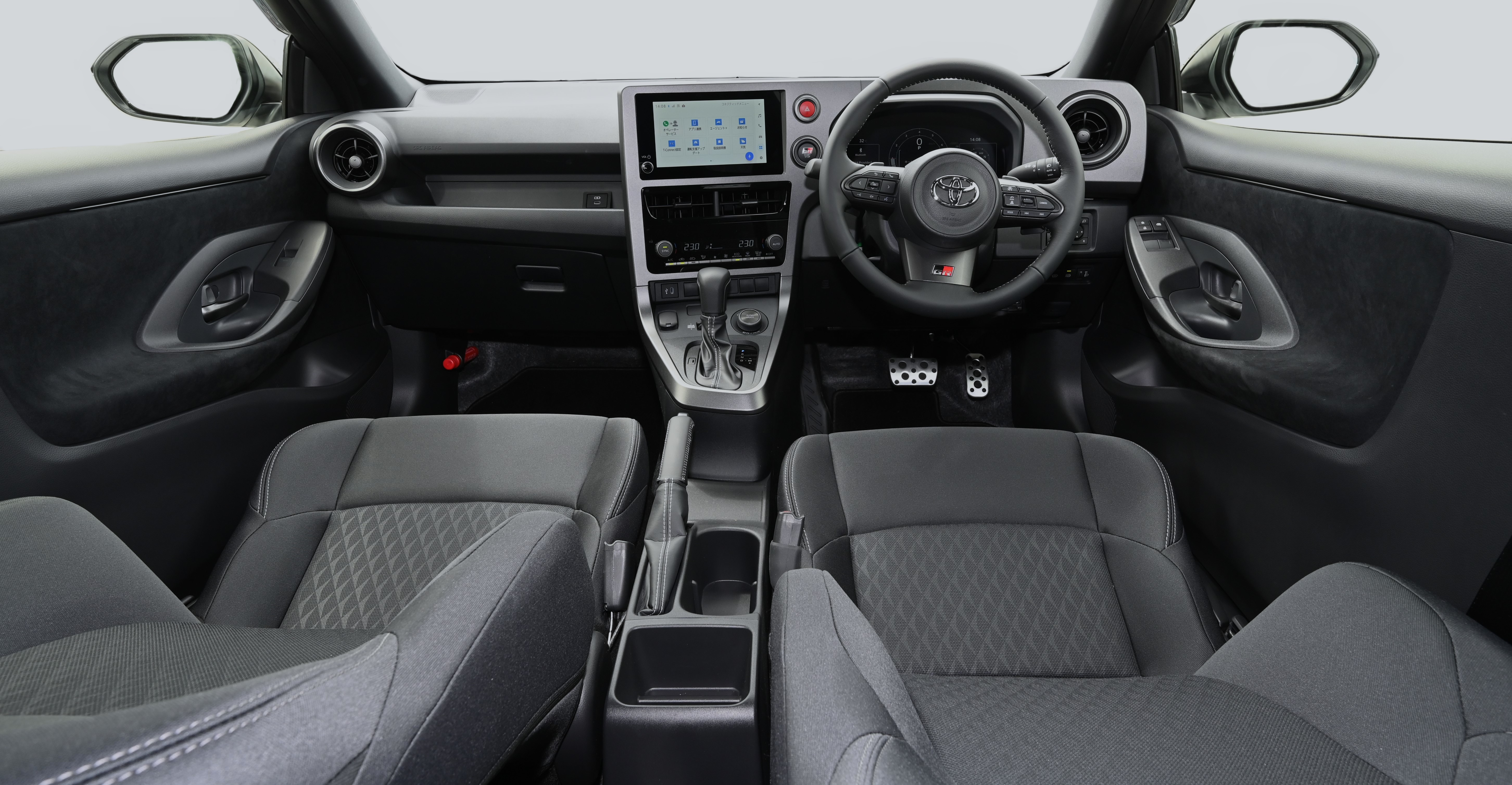
Interior (2024 facelift)

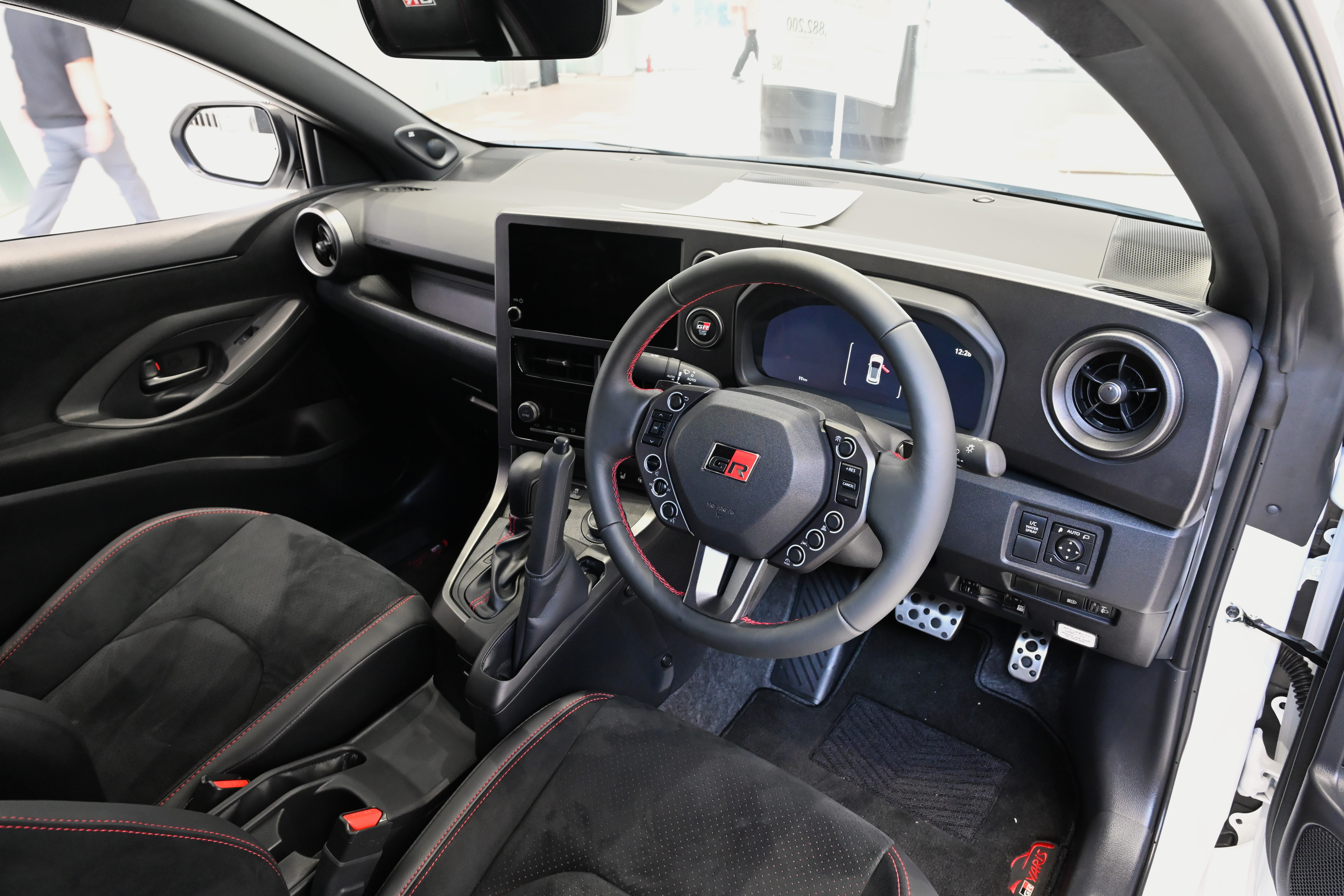
Interior (2026 minor change, with optional vertical handbrake)

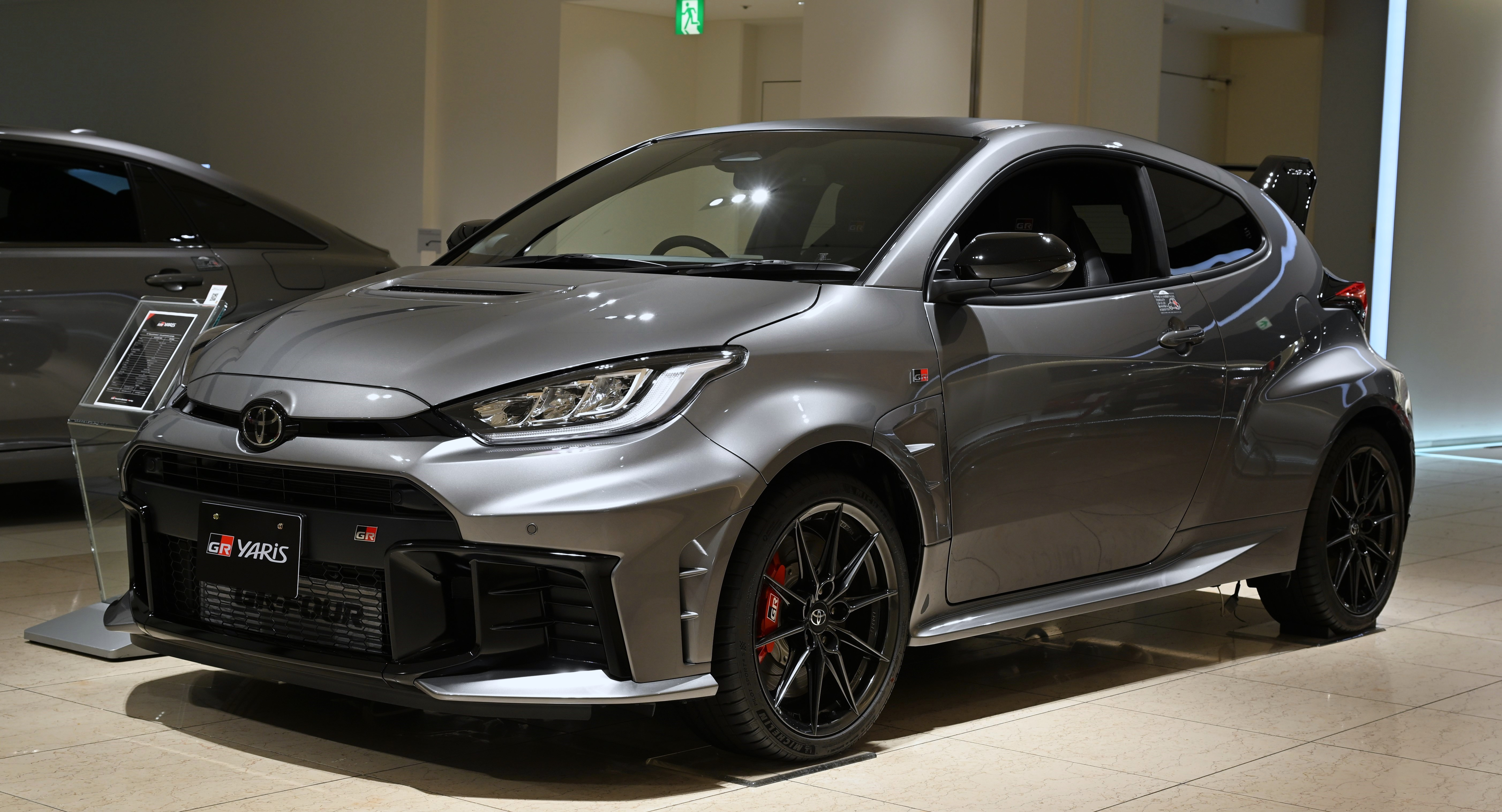
2025 RZ "High performance" with Aero performance package

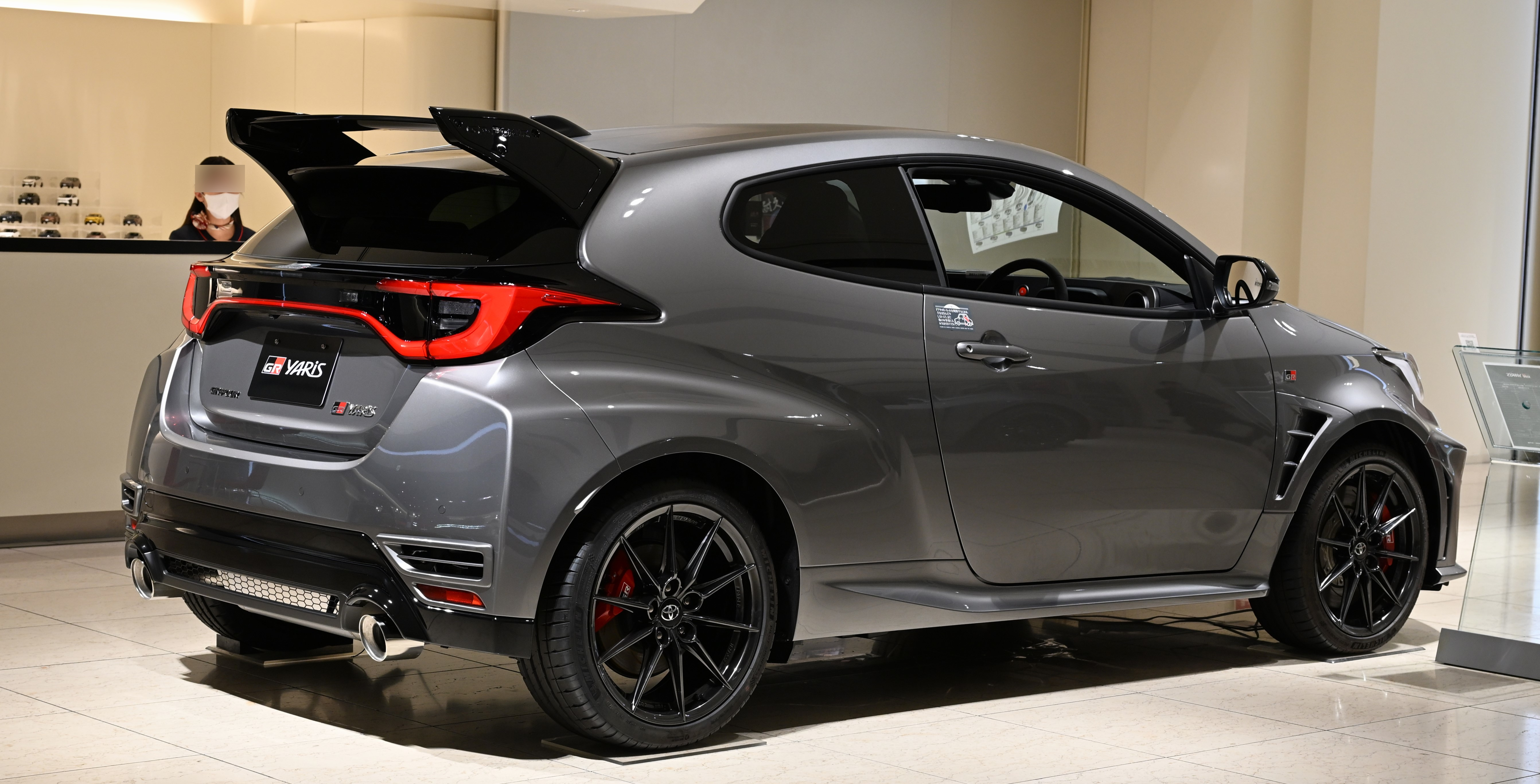
2025 RZ "High performance" with Aero Performance Package

== Special editions ==
=== GRMN Yaris (2022) ===
The GRMN Yaris ("GRMN" for Gazoo Racing, tuned by the Meister of the Nürburgring) is a limited-production (500 units) variant based on the GR Yaris RZ with:

- Increased engine torque output by 20 N⋅m (15 lb⋅ft) to 390 N⋅m (288 lb⋅ft), while the horsepower figure remain unchanged.
- Retuned close-ratio gear transmission and a low final gear set. The SNCM material was used and shot processing was added to first, third, fourth, fifth and final gears, which is claimed to significantly improving shock torque and fatigue strength.
- Reinforced metal clutch on the dual-mass flywheel.
- Usage of twill weave CFRP for the bonnet and roof and removal of rear passenger seats, which reduced the weight by approximately 20 kg (44.1 lb).
- Increased number of spot welds by 545 and enhanced body rigidity by applying additional 12 m (39.4 ft) of structural adhesive.

Apart from the regular GRMN Yaris, "Circuit Package" and "Rally Package" options were also available. The Circuit Package includes BBS GRMN bespoke 18-inch wheels, 18-inch brakes, Bilstein shock absorbers with adjustable damping force, carbon (twill weave CFRP) rear spoiler, side skirt and lip spoiler, while the Rally Package includes GR shock absorbers and short stabiliser link set, GR under guard set and GR roll bar (with side bar). Rally Package parts could be chosen separately.

The vehicle was unveiled at the 2022 Tokyo Auto Salon. Sales began in the first quarter of 2022, with pre-order on 14 January 2022.

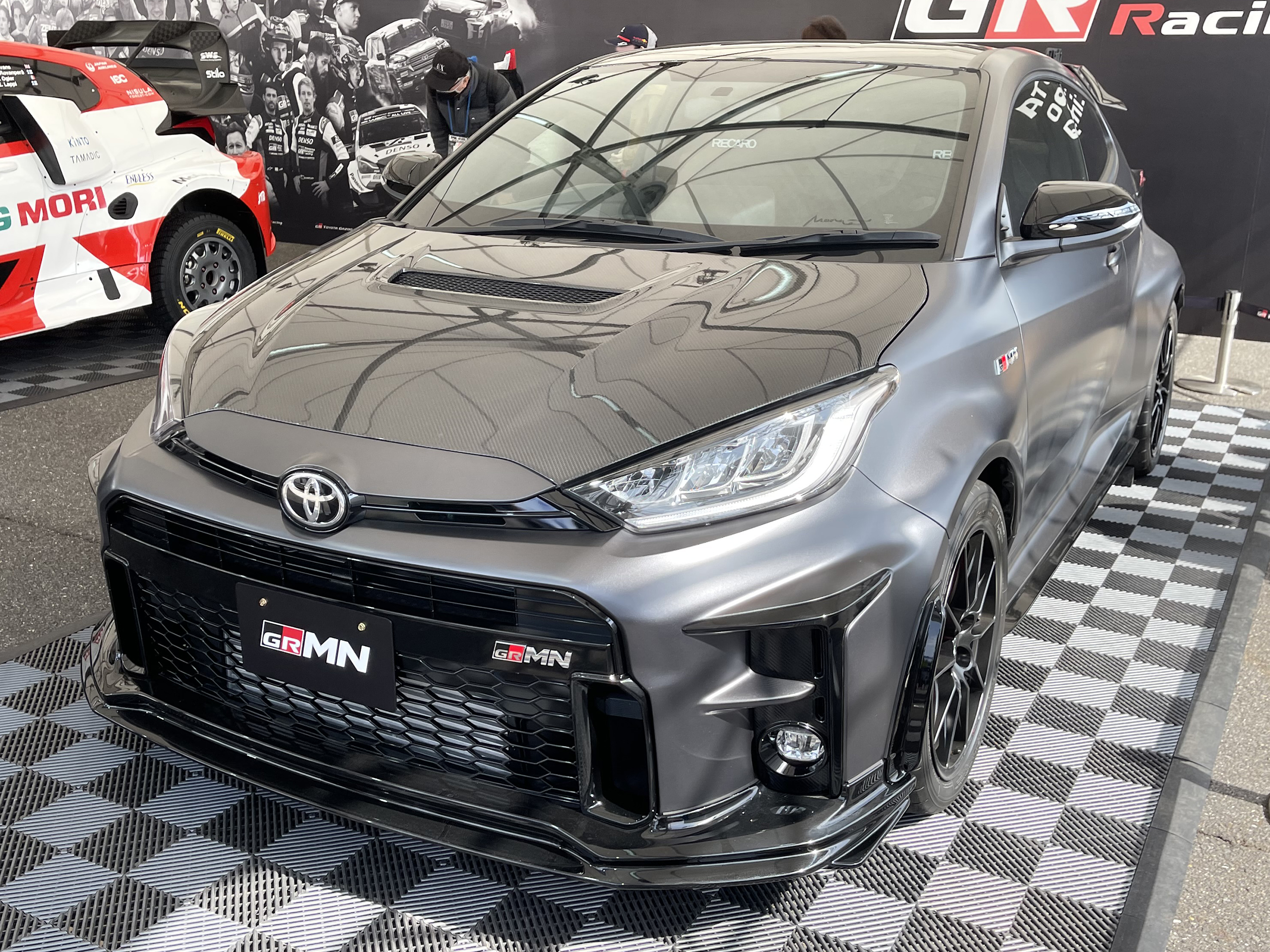
GRMN Yaris Circuit Package

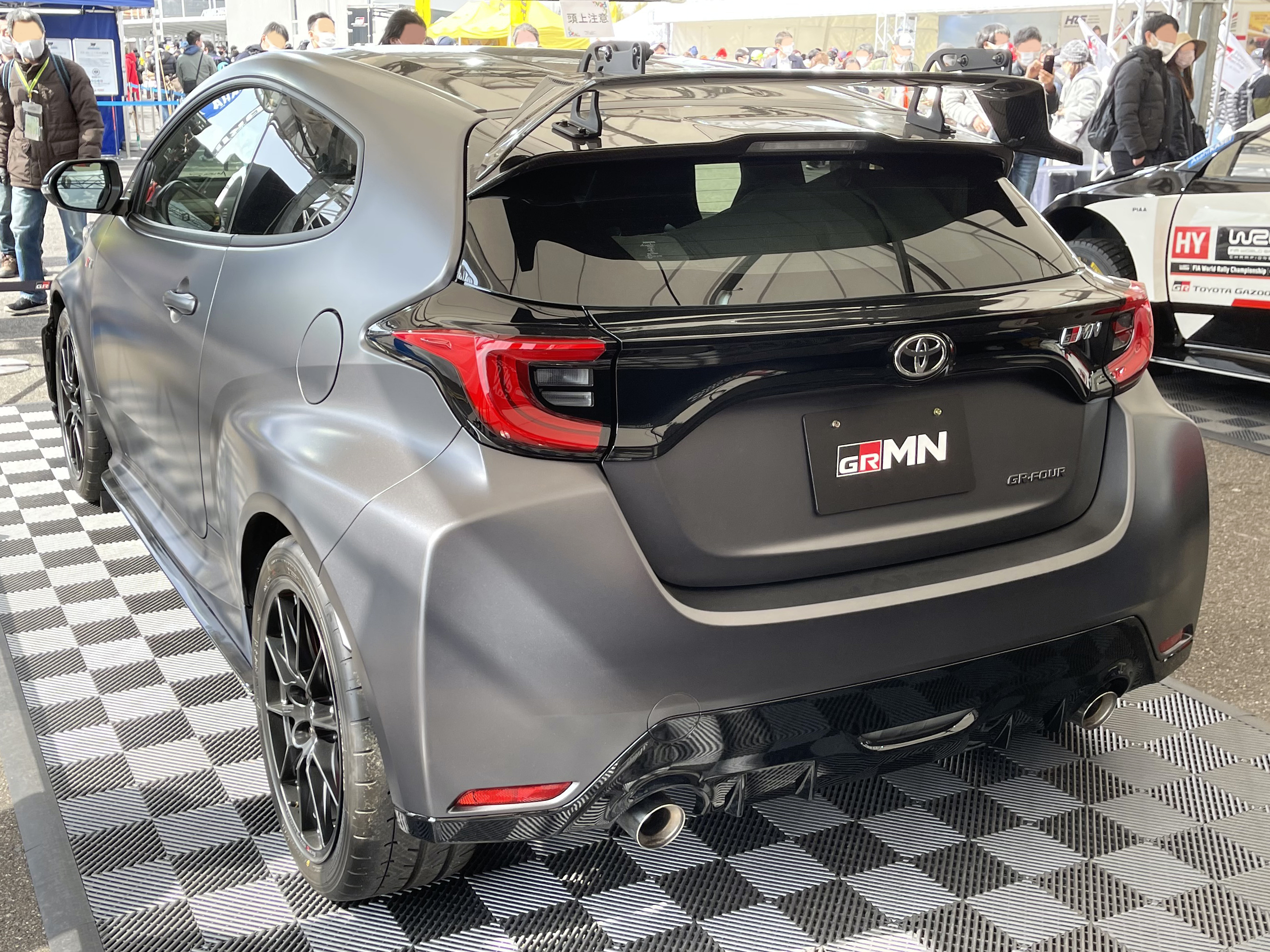
GRMN Yaris Circuit Package

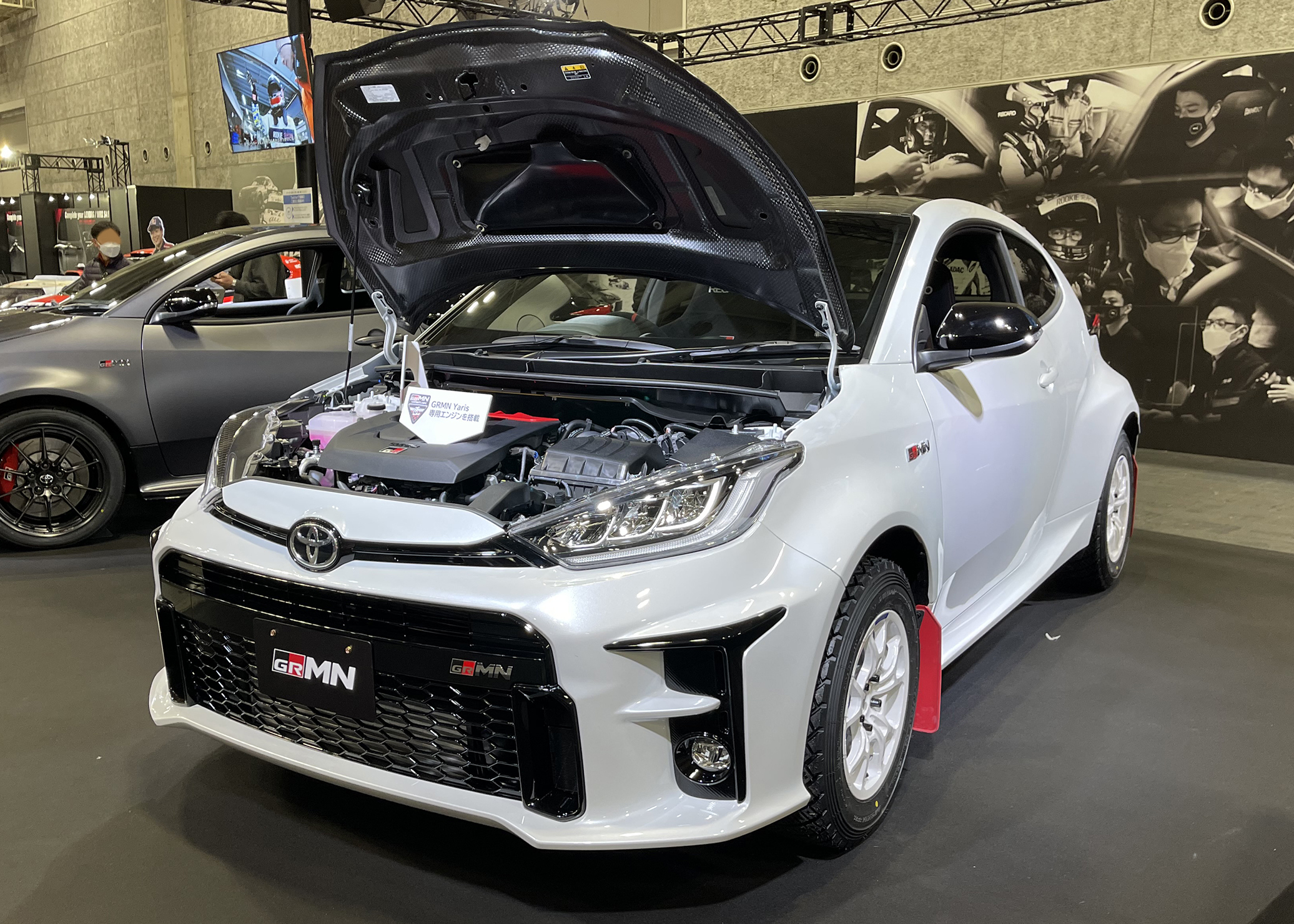
GRMN Yaris Rally Package with additional aftermarket modifications

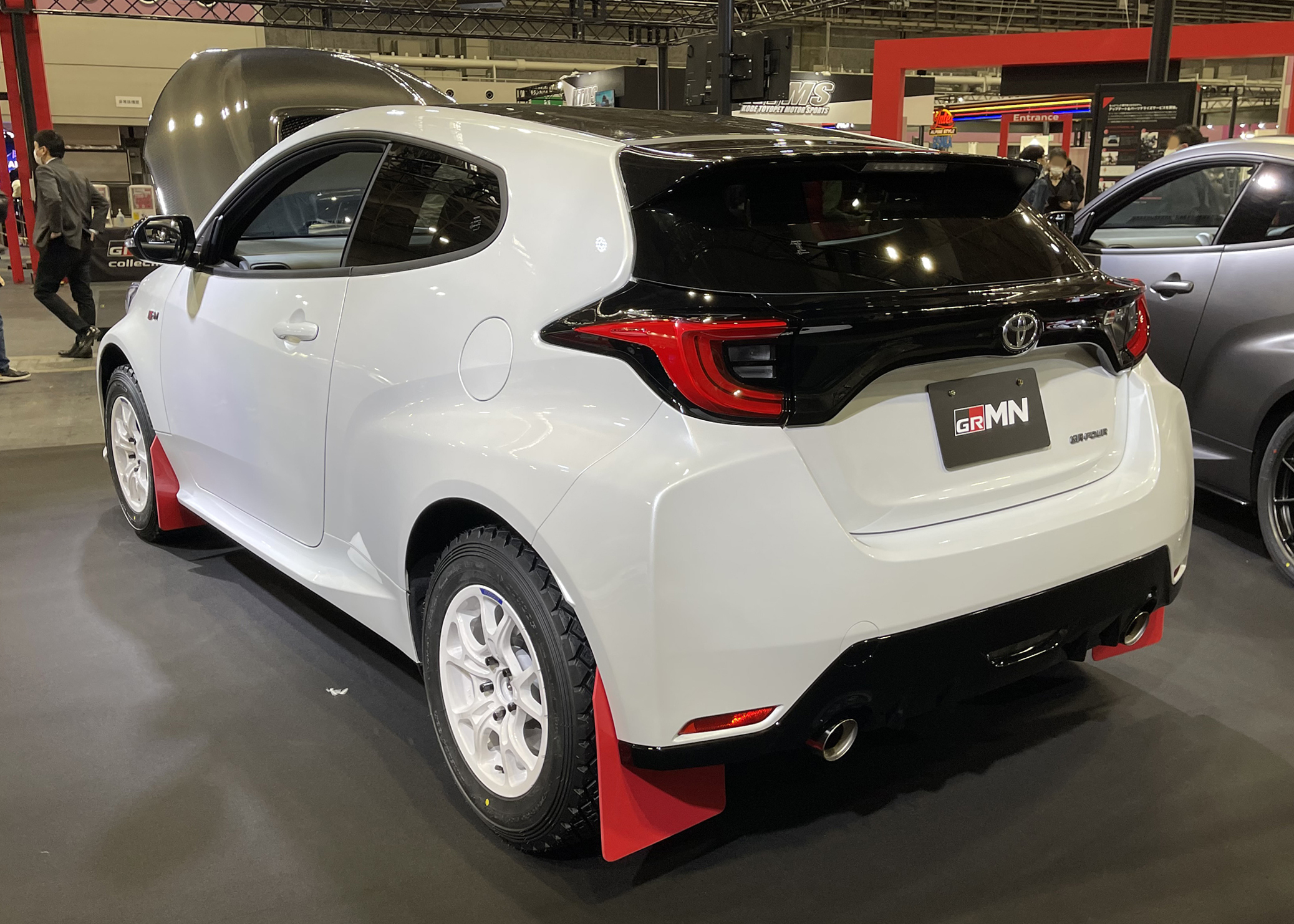
GRMM Yaris Rally Package with additional aftermarket modifications

=== Sébastien Ogier Edition (2024) ===
This special edition vehicle was unveiled at the Rallye Monte-Carlo on 25 January 2024 alongside the Kalle Rovanperä Edition. Production was limited to 100 units for Japan and 100 units for Europe. Based on the Type 24 RZ High Performance model, all vehicles are painted in matte stealth grey, and special features include a lightweight rally spoiler made of carbon fibre reinforced plastic, special BBS aluminium wheels with a French flag design, a decorative front radiator grille, blue calipers, and side decals, and S. Ogier Edition logo on the rear door.

The steering wheel features exclusive blue, grey and red stitching in a tricolour motif, and a WRC victory commemorative badge (serial number 001 to 200) is specially equipped in front of the passenger seat. It is also sold to the selected European markets.

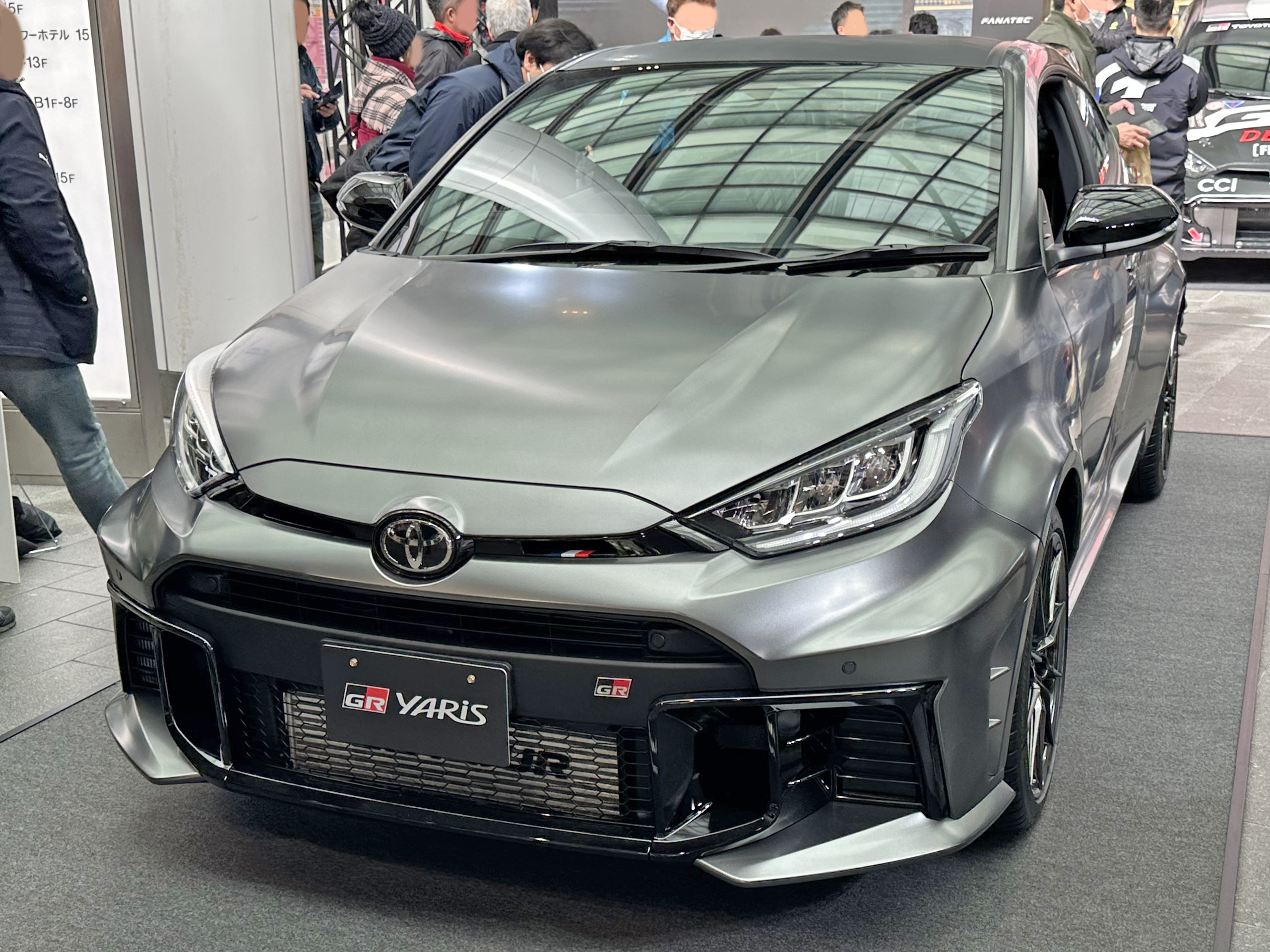
RZ "High performance Sébastien Ogier Edition" (Japan)

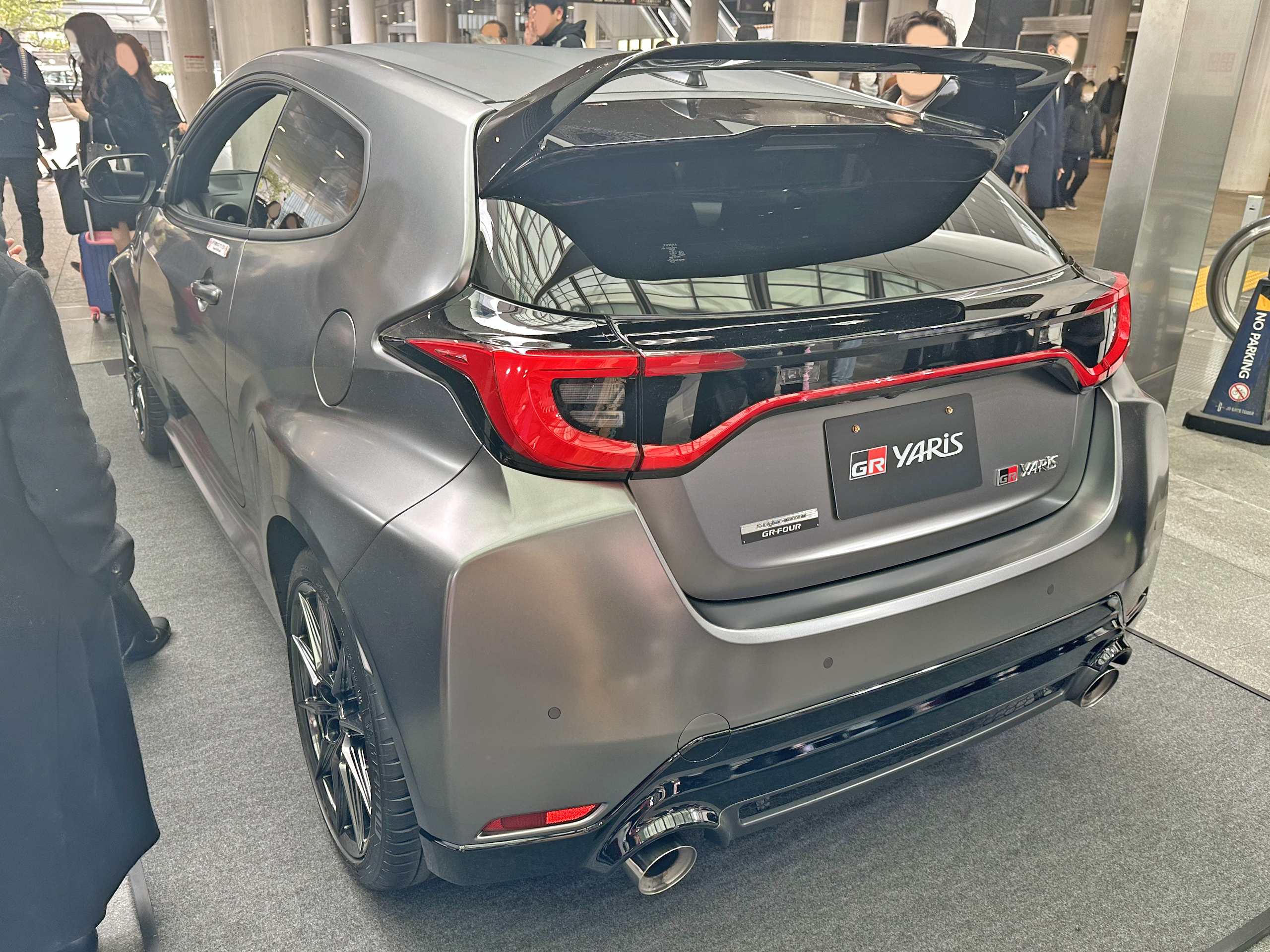
RZ "High performance Sébastien Ogier Edition" (Japan)

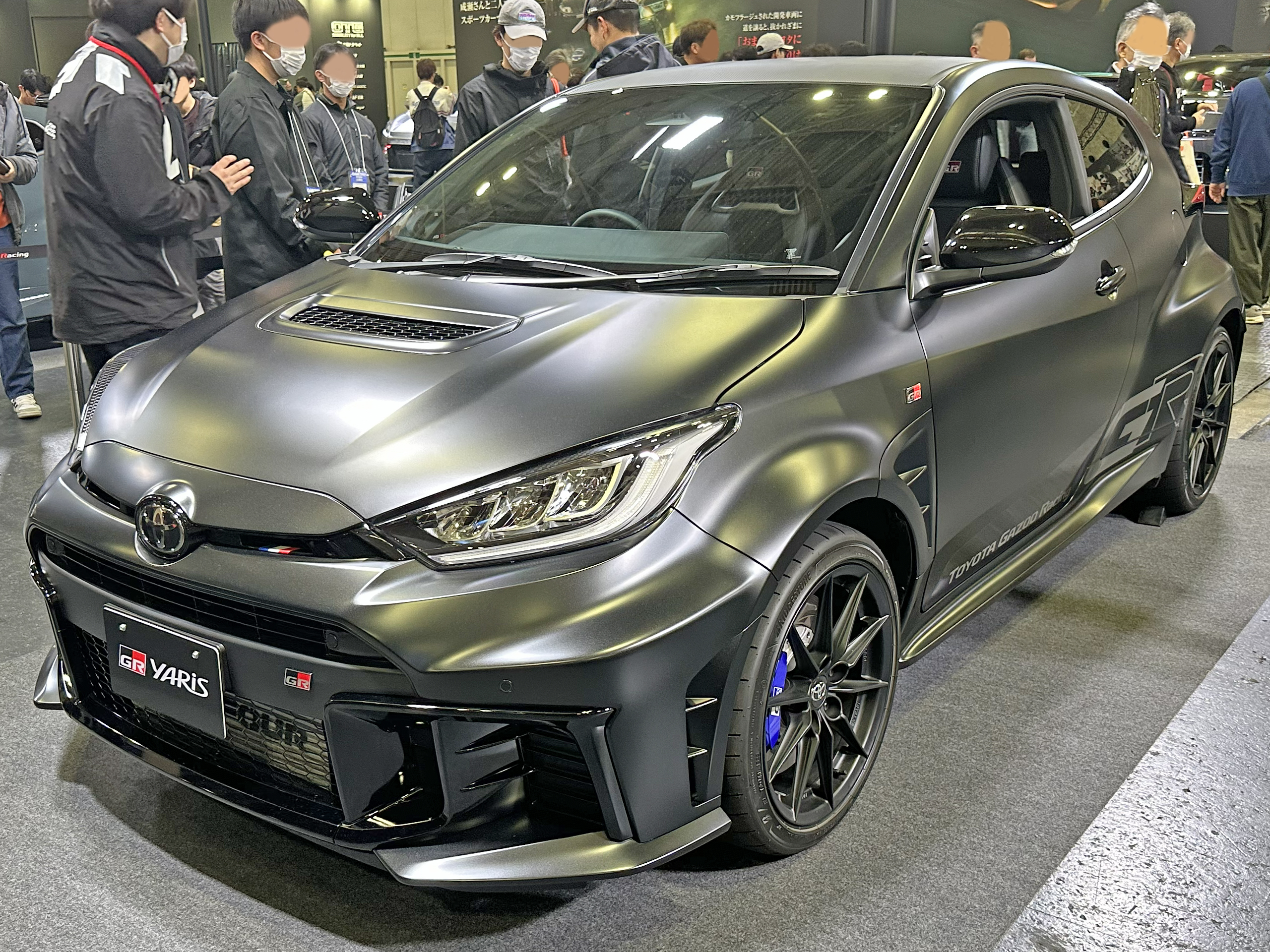
GR YARIS Sébastien Ogier 9x World Champion Edition

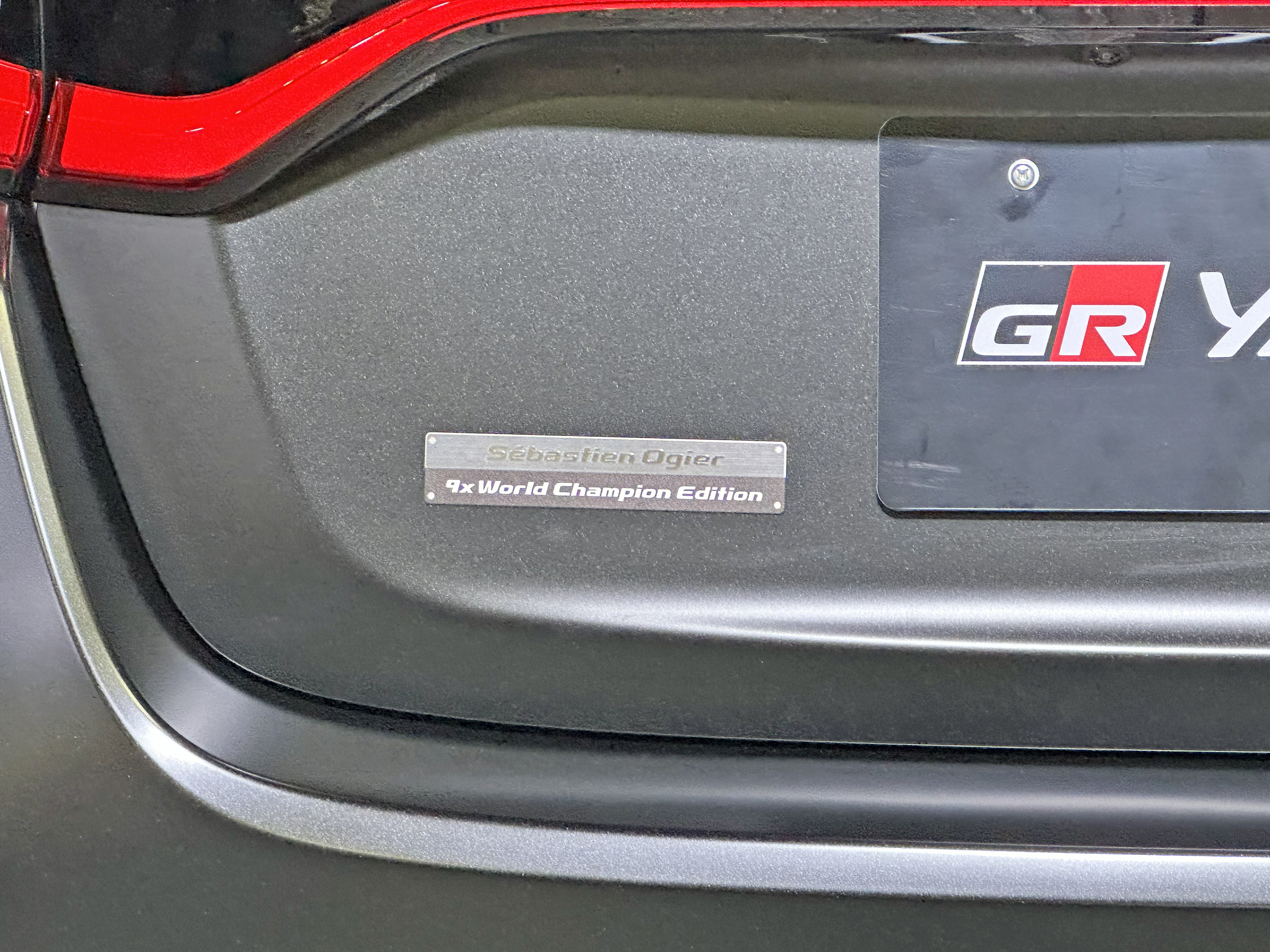
Sébastien Ogier 9x World Champion Edition

=== Kalle Rovanperä Edition (2024) ===
This special edition vehicle was unveiled at the Rallye Monte-Carlo on 25 January 2024, along with the Sèbastien Ogier edition. It features a three-colour livery and a motif of Rovanperä's car number, "69", CFRP variable wing rear spoiler, BBS aluminium wheels with the TOYOTA GAZOO Racing logo, and side and rear bumper decals.

The four-wheel drive control modes are "DONUT" and "KALLE", replaced the standard vehicle's GRAVEL and TRACK modes. "DONUT" is a mode for drifting that maximises the direct coupling of the front and rear wheels, while "KALLE" makes the most of the additional constant-speed rear differential

Production is limited to 100 units for Japan and 100 units for Europe.

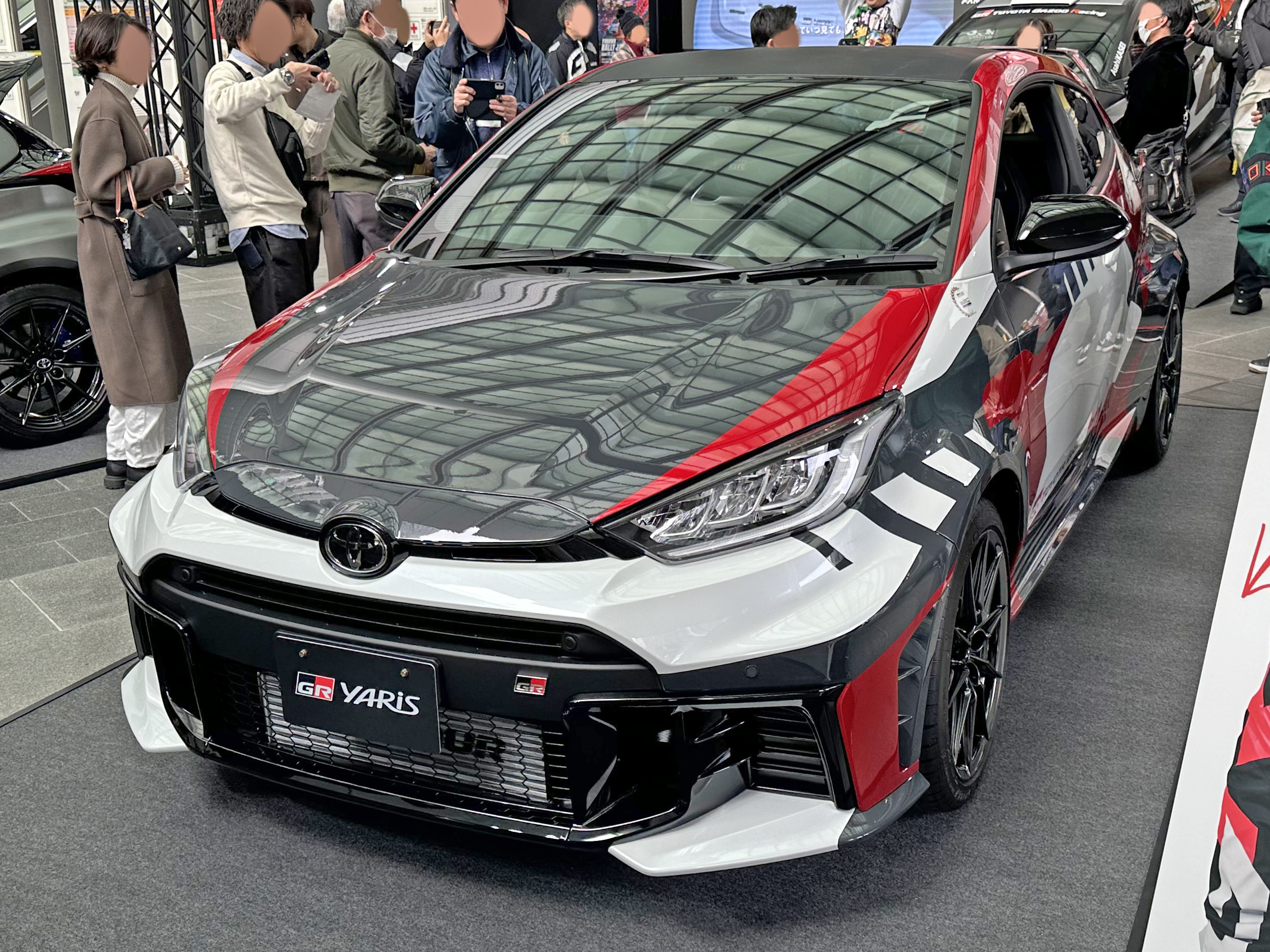
GR Yaris Kalle Rovanperä Edition

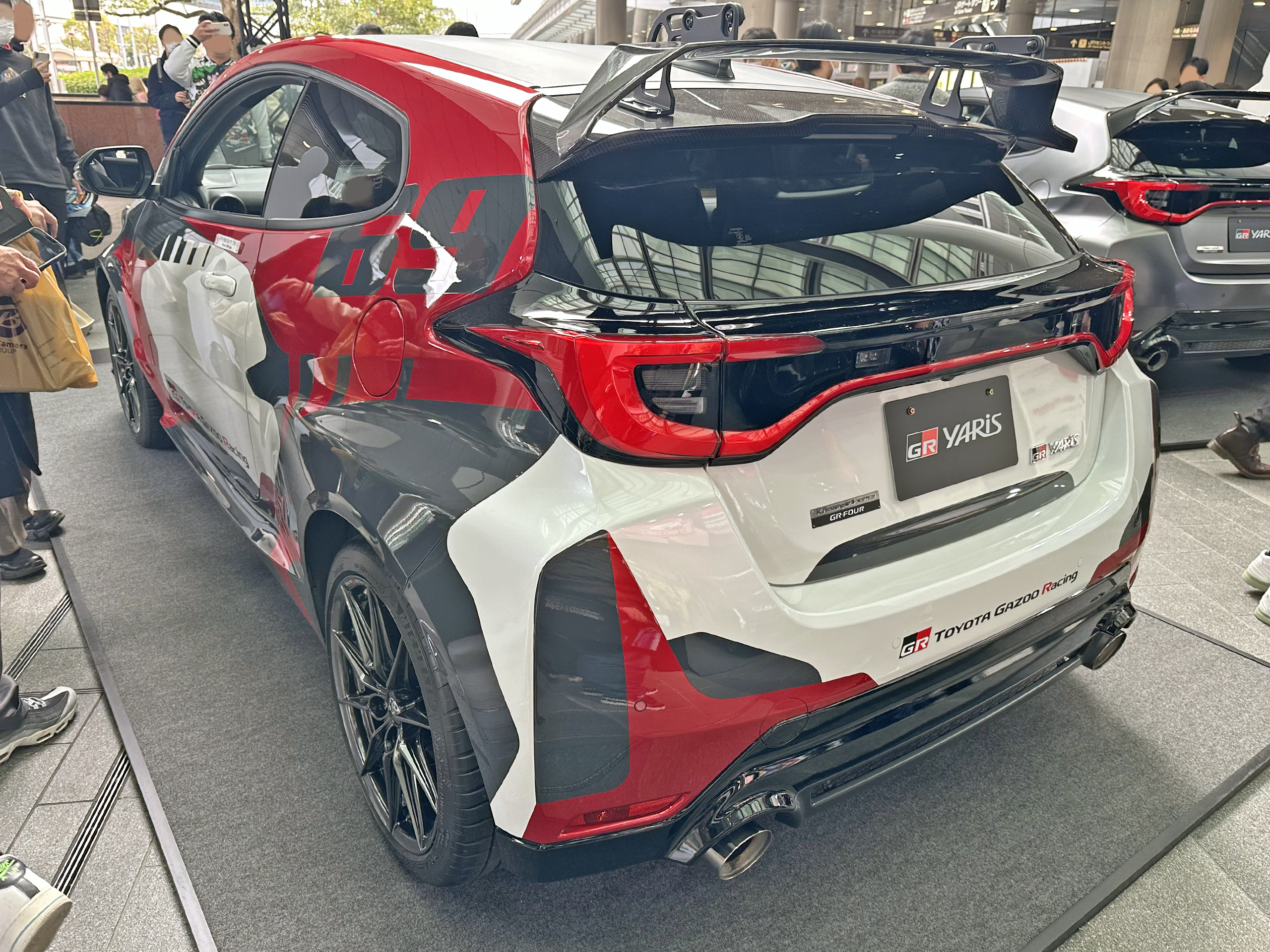
GR Yaris Kalle Rovanperä Edition (rear view)

=== Morizo RR (2026) ===
Toyota Gazoo Racing unveiled the GR Yaris MORIZO RR for the first time in January 2026 at the Tokyo Auto Salon.

The Morizo RR is a limited-production variant based on the GR Yaris RZ with a revised digital instrument cluster that shows the new drive mode, Morizo replaced gravel mode. The steering wheel is smaller than the base model and has modified paddle shifters. The wheel-mounted switches have also been changed for improved operability in motorsports, with inspiration coming from the switches used in the GR Yaris Rally2 rally car. Same as base model but with special exterior features a special carbon rear wing, front spoiler, side skirts and a carbon engine bonnet.

Production is limited to 100 units for Japan and 100 units for Europe.

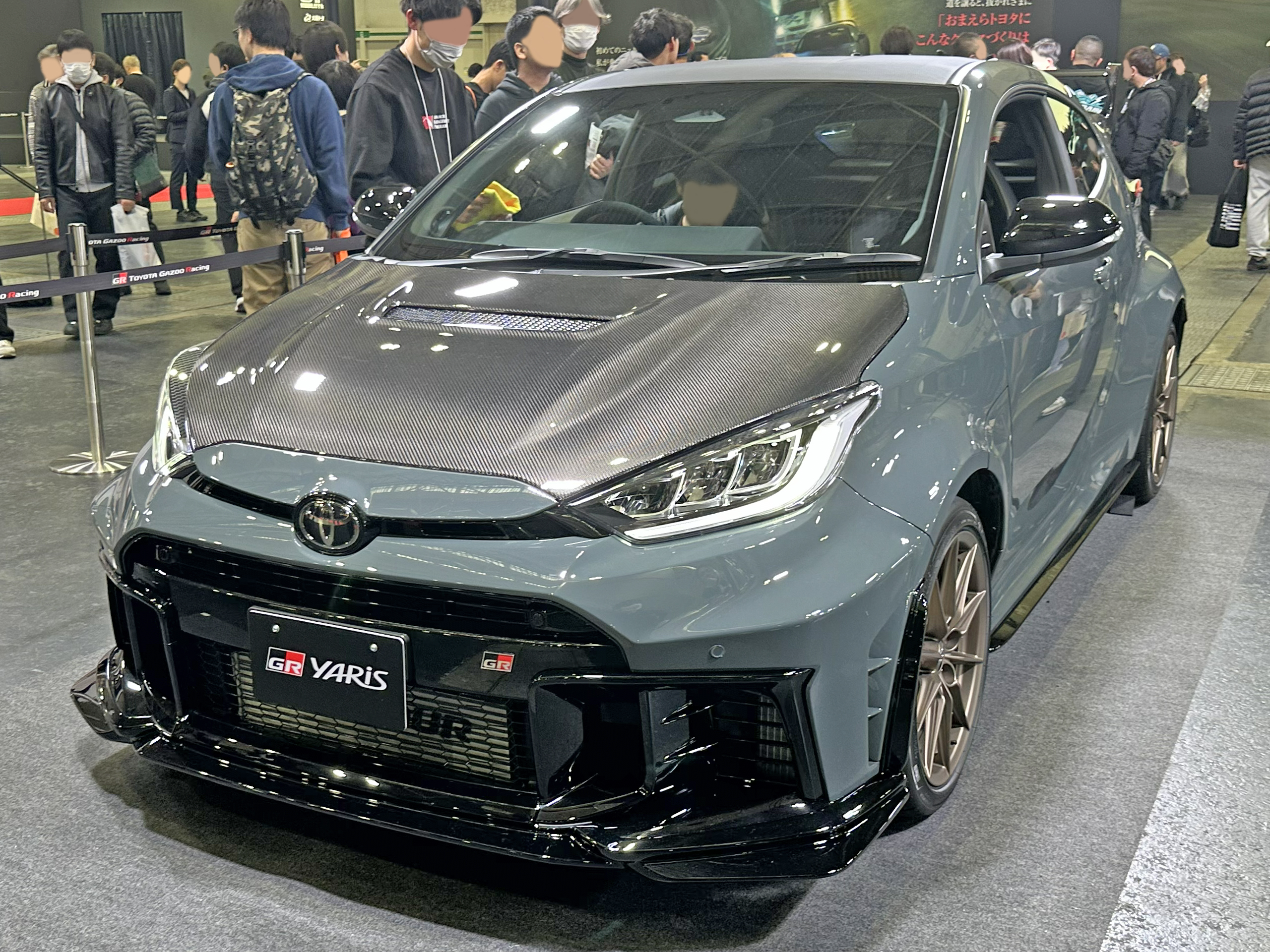
Front

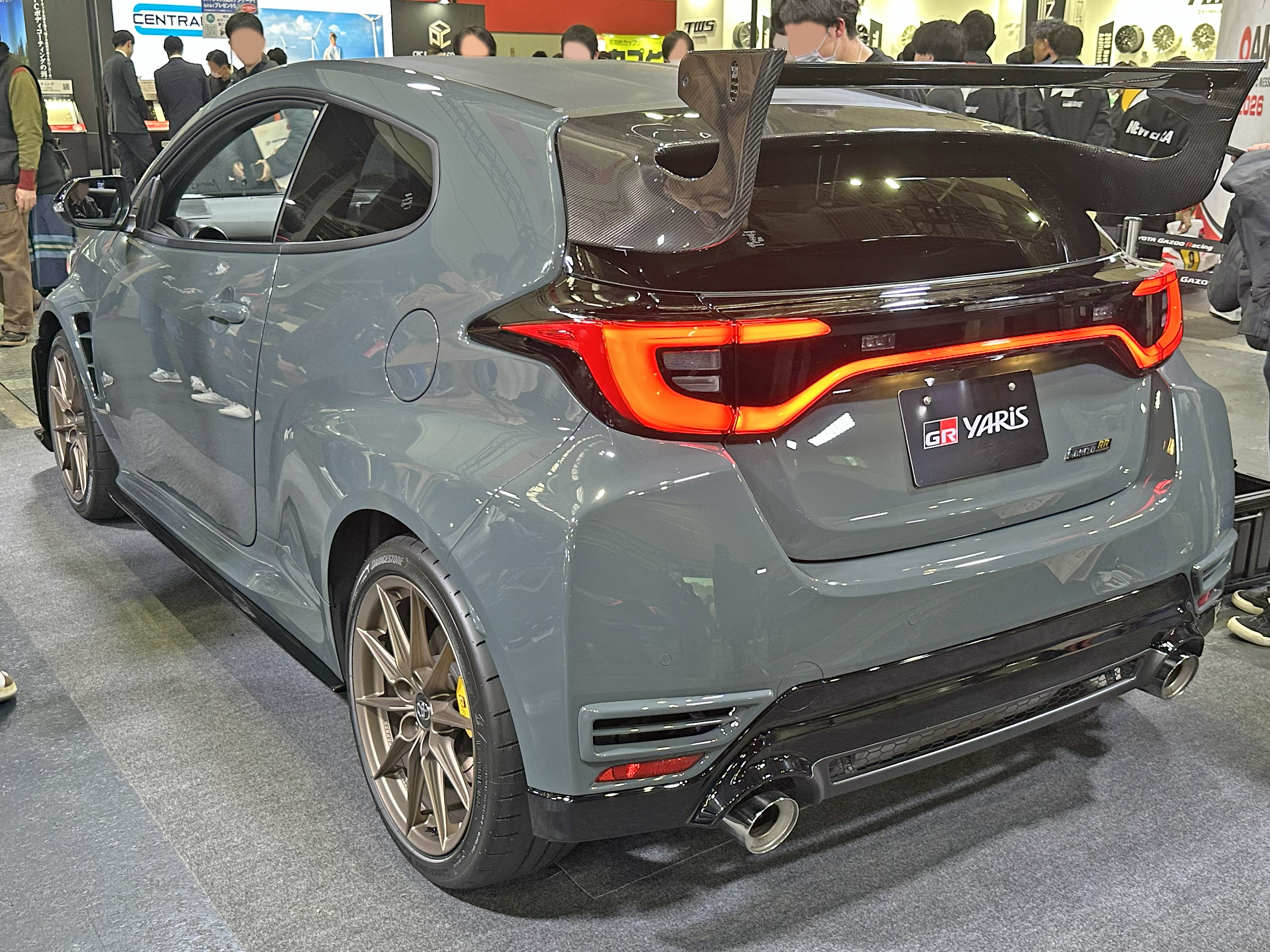
Rear view

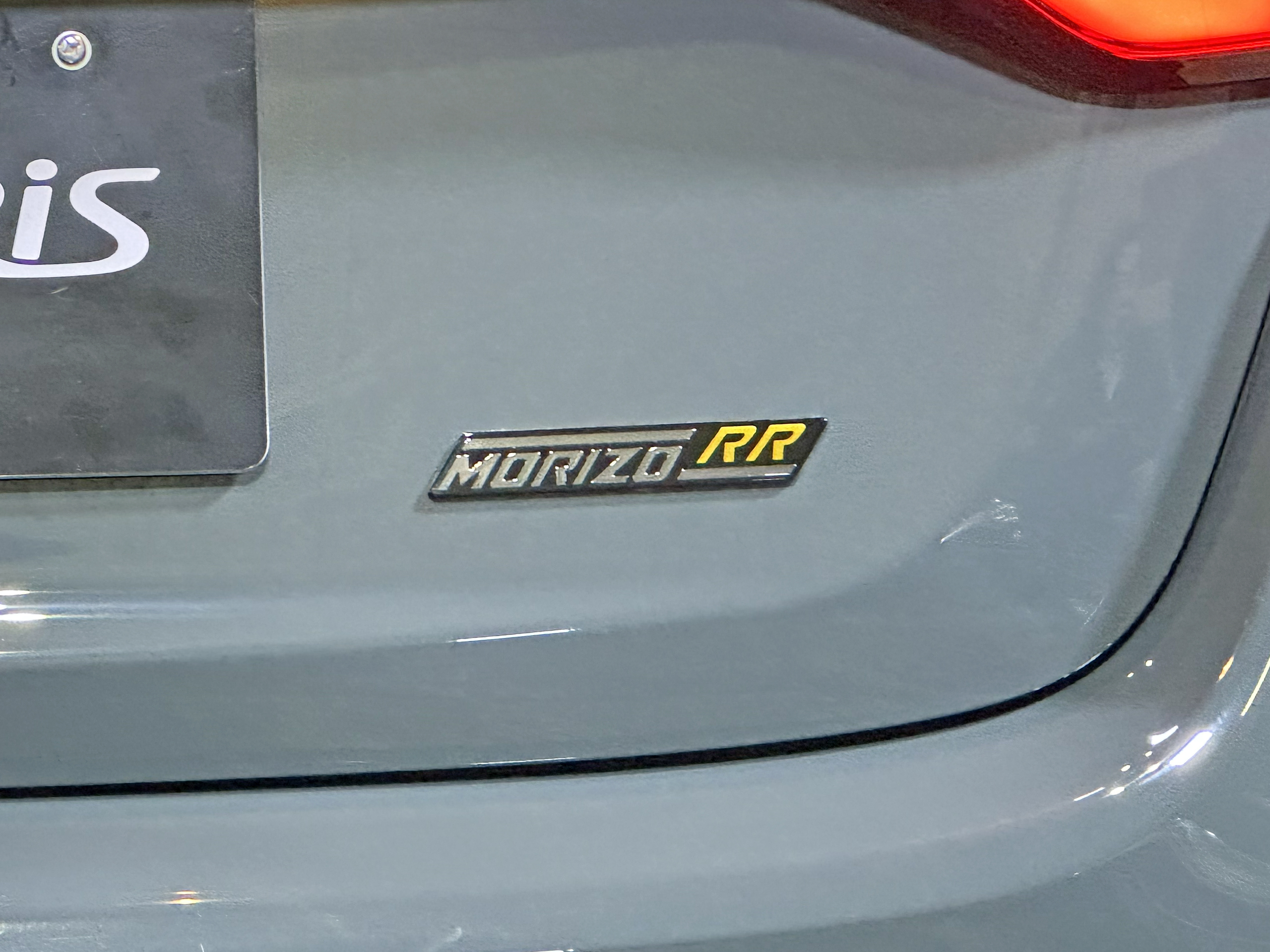
"Morizo RR" badge

== Concept models ==
=== GR Yaris Hydrogen ===
The GR Yaris Hydrogen is a GR Yaris with a modified G16E-GTS engine to run with hydrogen fuel.

== Motorsport ==
The GR Yaris served as the basis for the GR Yaris Rally1 car that made its debut in 2022 World Rally Championship season. It also made its Rally2 debut in 2024.

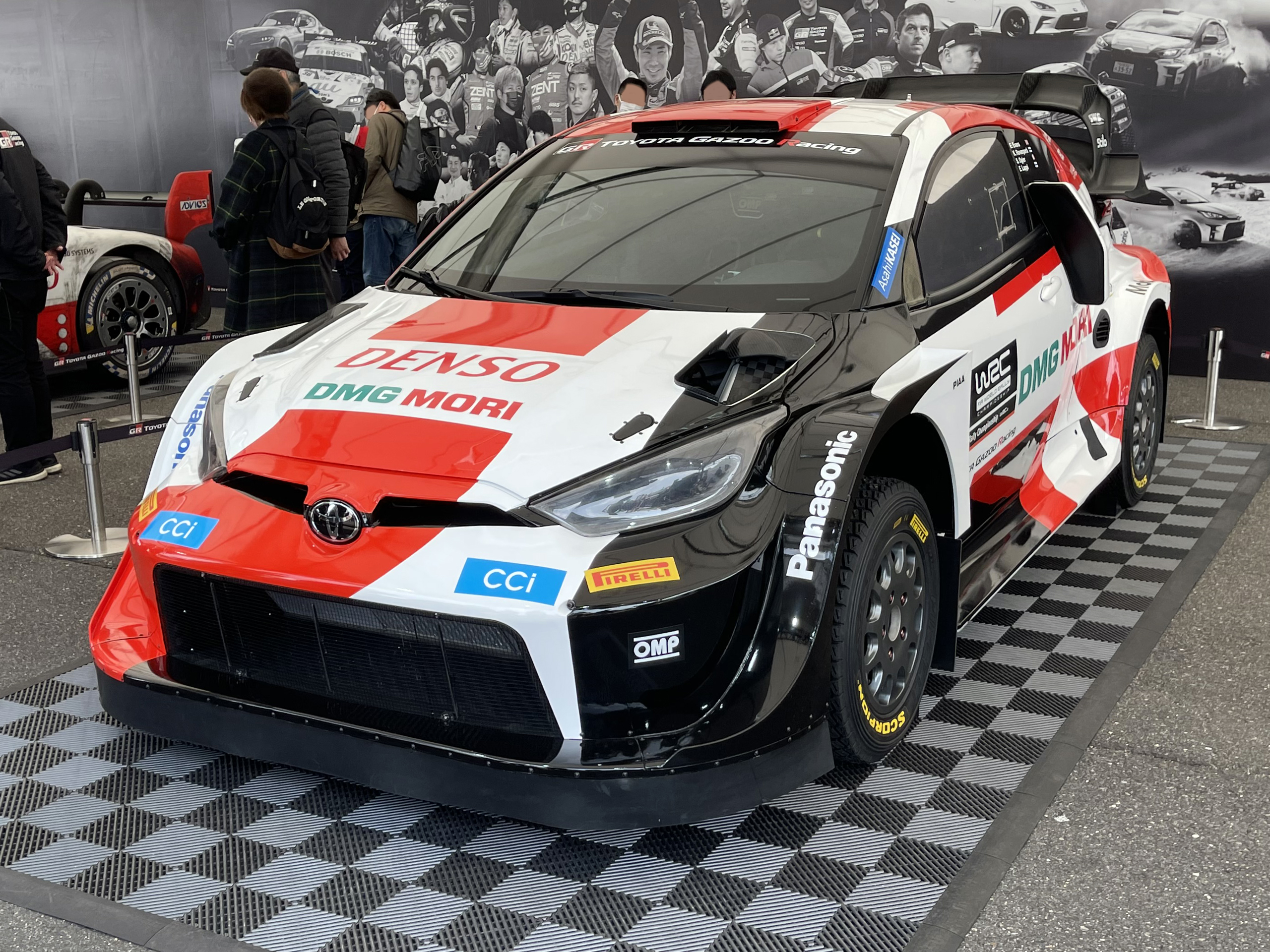
GR Yaris Rally1

== Awards ==
In January 2021, the GR Yaris was named Hot Hatch of the Year by What Car? magazine. What Car? awarded the GR Yaris five stars out of five in its review of the car.

The GR Yaris was awarded the 2021 UK Car of the Year, as well as winning the Best Performance award.

== Production ==
The GR Yaris went into production in September 2020 on a dedicated assembly line in the Motomachi plant, that Toyota calls the "GR Factory" and is staffed by master craftsman team members.

On 30 July 2021, the production of GR Yaris would be extended for two years due to strong demand for the vehicle and continues to be in production as of 2025.

== See also ==
- Toyota Gazoo Racing
- List of Toyota vehicles
