= 1988 24 Hours of Le Mans =

Sports car endurance race in France

Previous: 1987	Next: 1989
Index: Races | Winners

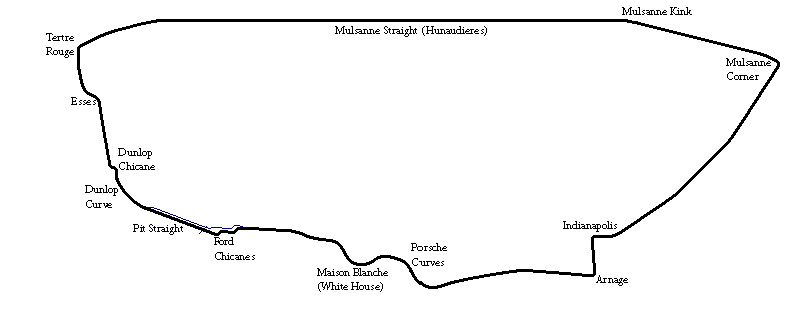
Le Mans in 1988

The 1988 24 Hours of Le Mans was the 56th Grand Prix of Endurance as well as the fifth round of the 1988 World Sports-Prototype Championship. It took place at the Circuit de la Sarthe, France, on the 11 and 12 June 1988. At their third attempt, Jaguar arrived with five cars to take on the strong Porsche works team of three cars, in their only race for the Championship season. The other potential rival was Sauber, now formally backed by Mercedes-Benz, but after a major high-speed tyre-blowout in practice, their two-car team was withdrawn.

From the start, it was a close duel between the two works teams. Even though Hans-Joachim Stuck had put in a blazing qualifying lap to lead a 1-2-3 grid for Porsche, it was Jan Lammers in his Jaguar who muscled his way up to the front. A blocked fuel-filter cost Klaus Ludwig two laps in the pole-sitting Porsche. Thereafter the chase was picked up by his teammate Bob Wollek, and he took the lead in the fourth hour. Along with the third works car run by the Andretti family and the Joest Porsche, these four cars continued dicing well into the night, constantly swapping positions. However, this year the usual Porsche reliability was missing: the Andretti car lost three laps repairing their water pump, then Wollek's car retired just before half-distance with engine failure. Jaguar did not have easy sailing either, as Boesel had retired at midnight with a broken gearbox. Meanwhile, hard driving by Stuck, Ludwig and van der Merwe had them back into the race, and the second half would be a duel between them and the Jaguar of Lammers, Dumfries and Wallace. A light shower late in the morning just added to the tension with Stuck, a wet-weather master, getting ever closer.

Once the rain passed, the Jaguar drivers were able to stabilise the gap, and going into the last hour had a comfortable 1-lap lead. That was until the gearbox broke. Lammers, mindful of what Boesel had told him about his own cars demise, had the presence of mind to select fourth gear and not shift for the rest of the race. The last drama was their final pitstop, but Lammers dropped the clutch and with a shove from his pit crew, got back on the track. Ludwig, unaware of the dire situation facing the Jaguar, had little fuel left himself and could not put pressure on to force a mistake. Lammers led home a formation finish with his remaining two team-mates, as the track was invaded by delirious British fans. After twenty-four hours, the margin of victory was one of the tightest in the race's history - less than half a lap. The Joest Porsche finished third, nine laps behind.

There was another major milestone in this race. The small WM Secateva team had always built their cars for speed and never foresaw outright victory. Their current goal was to be the first car to break the 400 km/h barrier at Le Mans. Now with significant backing from Peugeot for their twin-turbo engine, they had their best opportunity. As the evening cooled, the two team-cars had already had several issues. Roger Dorchy was called in and the crew taped up all the vents to minimise air-friction and wound the turbo-boost right up. Knowing he only had several laps, Dorchy went out to give his best effort. On his second lap, he broke the radar speed trap on the Mulsanne straight at 405 km/h (252 mph). Sure enough, the engine soon gave up, but it was mission accomplished for the team.

== Regulations ==
The French central and local governments cooperated to do major upgrades on the Hunaudières back straight. With laser technology, it was resurfaced with high-grip asphalt along its whole length, with a gradient of 2 percent. Over 12,500 tonnes of material was removed from the roadway, including a reduction of the problematic hump approaching Mulsanne corner. This all contributed to increase the maximum speeds of the cars, and following recent alarming accidents on the straight, it was also fitted with high, three-tier Armco fencing. During practice, Porsche works driver Hans-Joachim Stuck commented:

"It's so smooth now it's like driving down the Champs Élysées in a Mercedes limousine."

Concerned with the increasing impact of greater downforce, the FIA (Fédération Internationale de l'Automobile) set maximum dimensions for the underbody ground-effect tunnels. The other change was to increase the fuel allocation for the C2 class up to 1815 litres – still quite restrictive, precluding the full power of turbo engines. The ACO (Automobile Club de l'Ouest) cancelled the test day from the general lack of interest from the contestants over the past two years, given the cost for closing public roads. This year, the race start was moved to 3pm to give the local spectators time to vote in the French elections held over the same weekend.

There had been notable changes in the organisation of the international racing bodies following the re-signing of Concorde Agreement in 1987. Max Mosley, recently-appointed president of FISA, convinced FIA president Jean-Marie Balestre to bring Bernie Ecclestone (co-signatory of Concorde for the rival FOCA group) into the fold as an FIA vice-president responsible for the sport's promotion. This was a move that would have far-reaching ramifications for sports-car racing in the future.

== Entries ==
Including the specialist racing manufacturers, there were fully 27 factory cars in the Le Mans entry list. They were headlined by the five Jaguars, up against Porsche, Nissan, Toyota and Sauber-Mercedes in C1, while Mazda had the GTP class to itself.

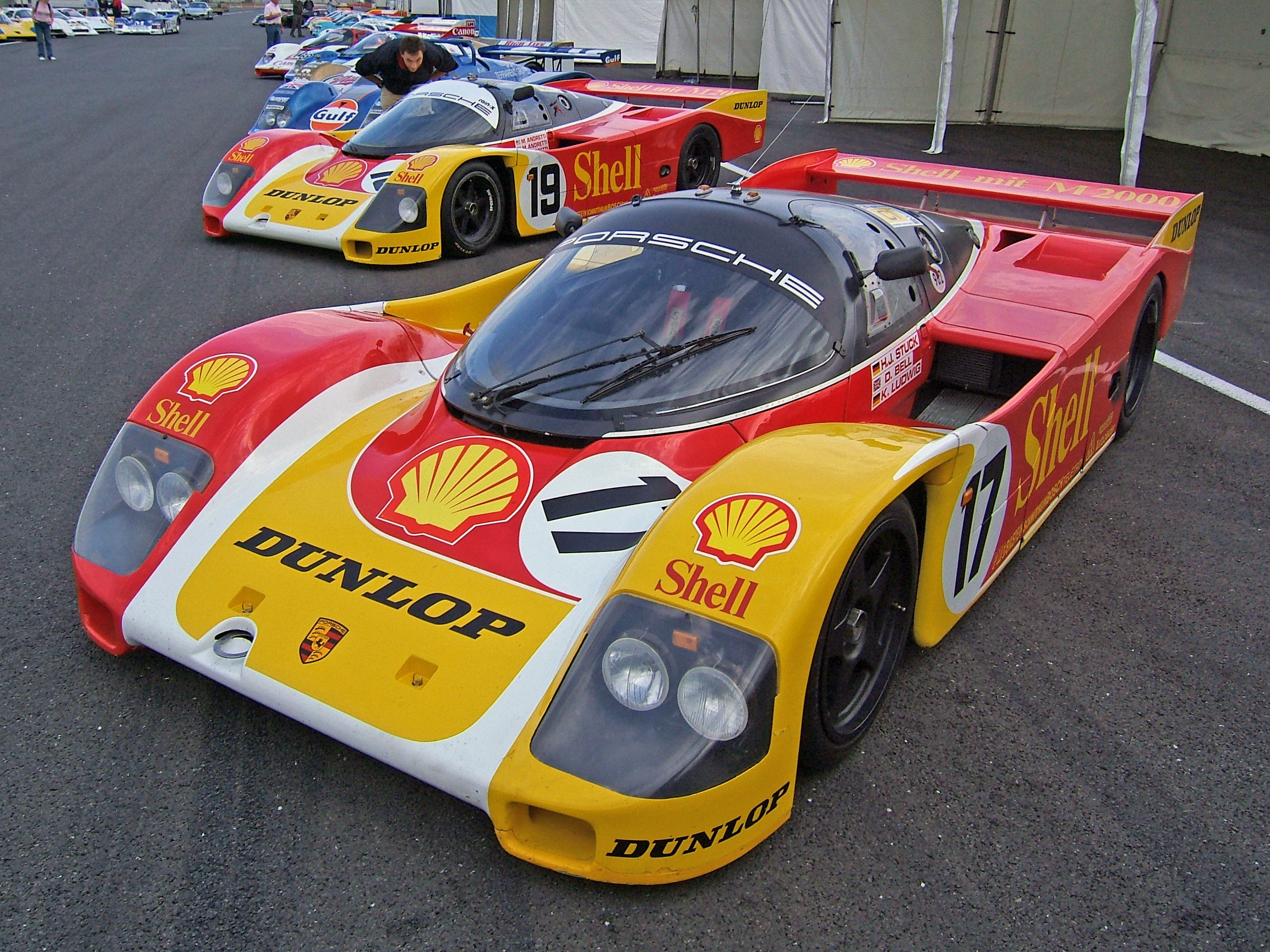
Porsche works team, now in Shell livery

Class	Quantity	Turbo+Rotary engines
Group C1	39 / 29	34 / 24
IMSA-GTP	5 / 3	3 / 3
Group C2	25 / 17	3 / 2
IMSA-GTXP	1 / 0	0 / 0
Total Entries	70 / 49	40 / 29

- Note: The first number is the number accepted, the second the number who started.

=== Group C1 ===
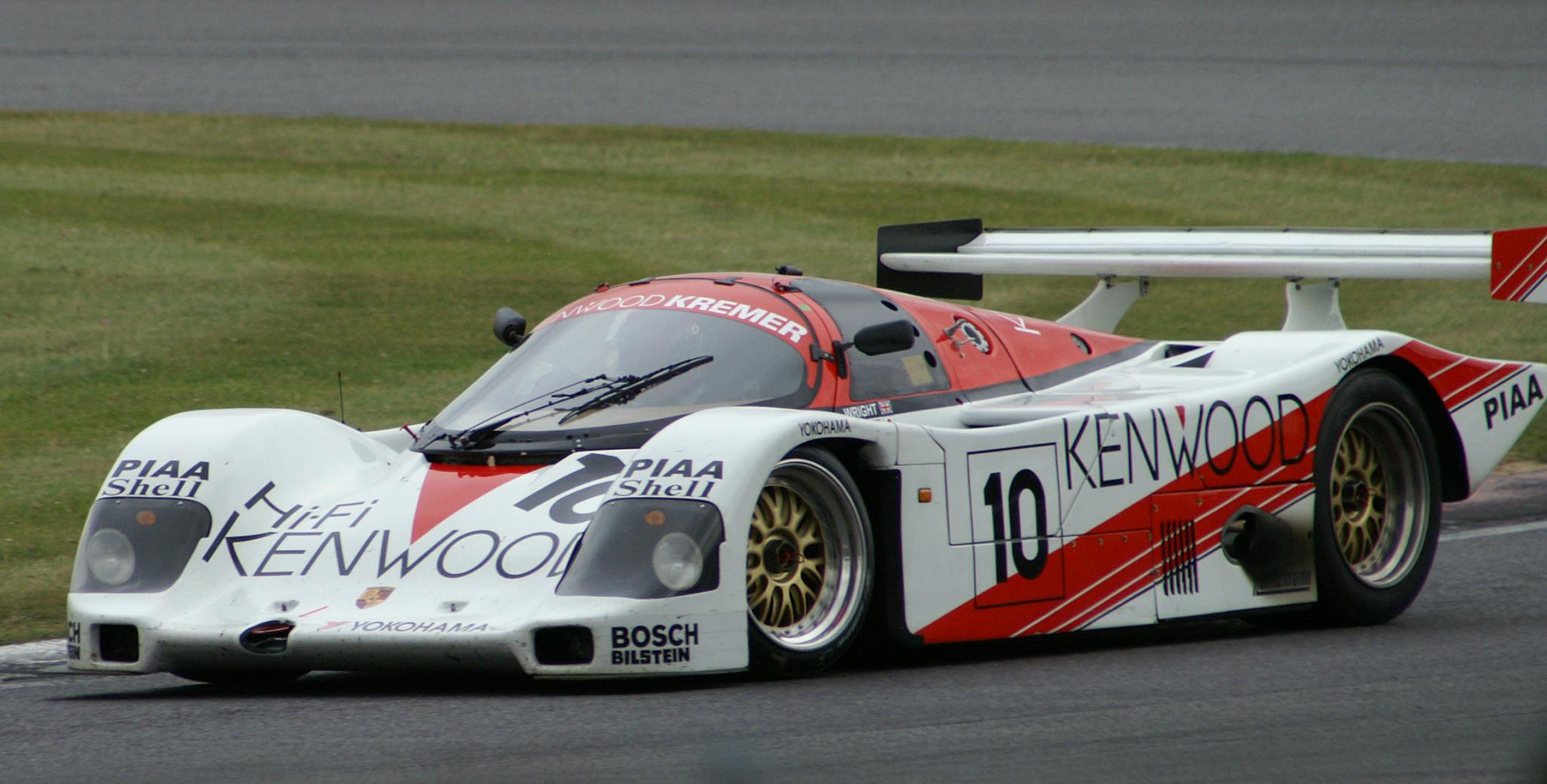
Porsche 962CK6 of Kremer Racing

Defending champion, Porsche, was now focused on its F1 TAG-engine program with McLaren and moving into the US IndyCar series (being directed by Al Holbert). The works team had left the World Sportscar Championship in the middle of the previous year. They chose the prestigious Le Mans 24-hours as their only race in the championship this year. Three cars again were entered, along with a test-car, all decked out now in the red and yellow livery of their long-time sponsor Shell. The engines were fitted with the new iteration of the Bosch Motronic 1.7 engine-management system, giving 50 more horsepower. A new chassis was given to Derek Bell and Hans-Joachim Stuck, bringing in Joest driver Klaus Ludwig as their third driver – one of the greatest driving combinations seen, with ten Le Mans victories between them. Ludwig's erstwhile teammate Bob Wollek was partnered with Vern Schuppan and Sarel van der Merwe in a late-'87 chassis. The final car was the one that had taken pole position the year before. It was driven by the Andretti family: Mario Andretti back with his son Michael and this time joined by his nephew John. The winning car from 1987 was used as the T-car.

The heavy lifting during the season for Porsche was carried by the loyal customer teams. The 3.0-litre engine had now been released to them and a number of the teams picked them up. Two of them went to Brun Motorsport, who had brought their cars from last year. Regular team drivers Sigala/Pareja/Schäfer had the lead car. Team-owner Walter Brun stayed on the pit-wall this year, with his attention this season now also diverted by his EuroBrun foray into Formula 1, with his lead driver Oscar Larrauri. The team had boycotted the Silverstone round, protesting the

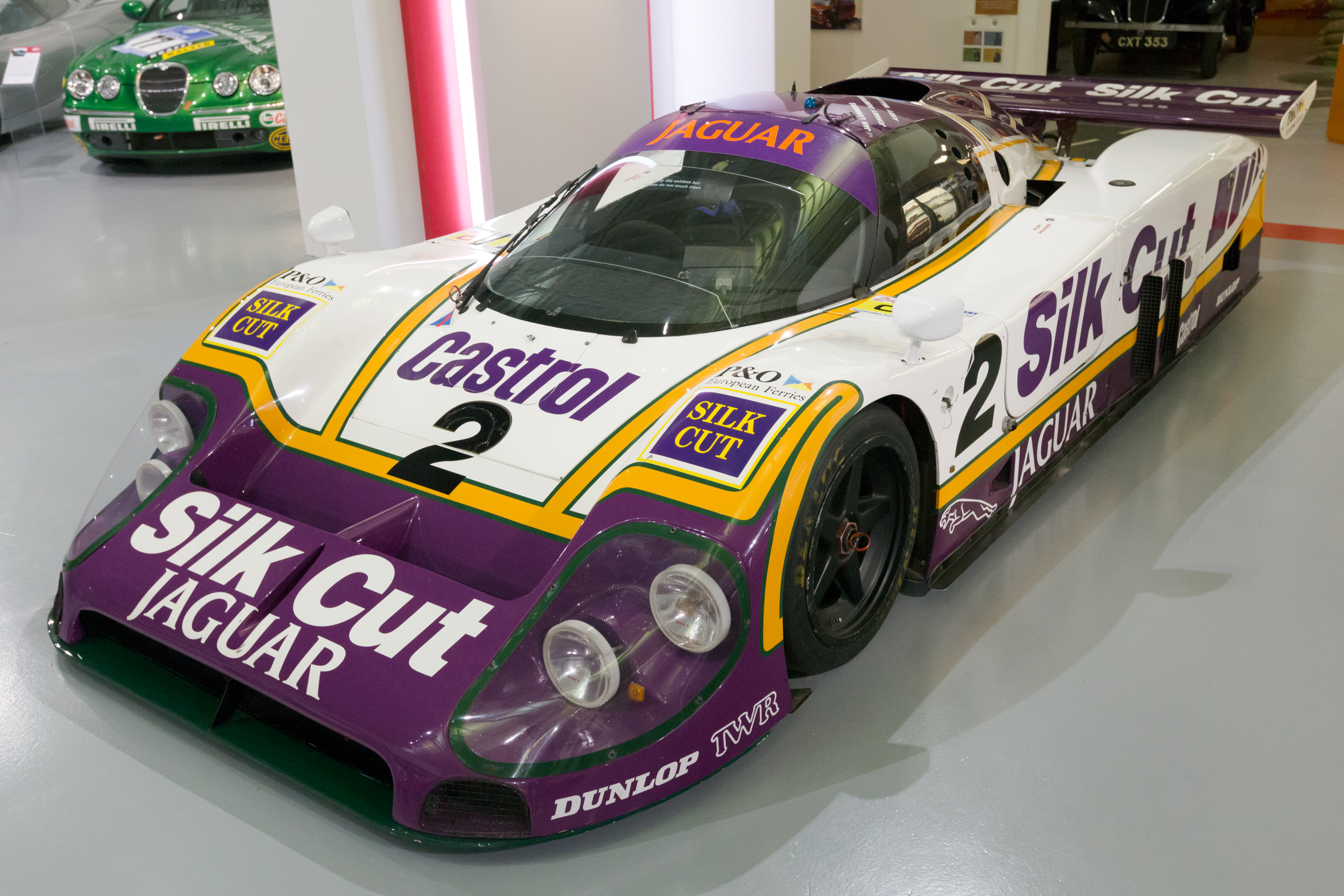
Jaguar XJR-9

Porsche works team keeping the new Motronic system to itself. By contrast, the Joest Racing team had their own 2.8-litre engines. With the two lead drivers commandeered by the works team, the first car was driven by their other drivers: Frank Jelinski and wealthy former-winner "John Winter" (Louis Krages) with Swede Stanley Dickens. The other car was a converted 956 chassis for David Hobbs/Didier Theys/Franz Konrad. The Kremer brothers had two honeycomb/carbon chassis built by the British TC Prototypes company. The brand new 3-litre car was given to Nissen/Grohs/Fouché. The 2.8-litre WSP car was the modified K6 with its vertical fin, driven by Bruno Giacomelli and Japanese champions Kunimitsu Takahashi and Hideki Okada. Vern Schuppan was running in a works car, but his team in the All-Japan Championship was entered this year. His drivers were the veteran crew of Brian Redman, Eje Elgh and Jean-Pierre Jarier. The small Obermaier Racing team, that had done a giant-killing act the previous year to finish second, was back with Jürgen Lässig joined by Pierre Yver and Dudley Wood. In contrast, as an example of the fragility and expense of racing, the otherwise well-performing Richard Lloyd Racing team had to withdraw their entries when sponsorship fell through just days before the start of the season.

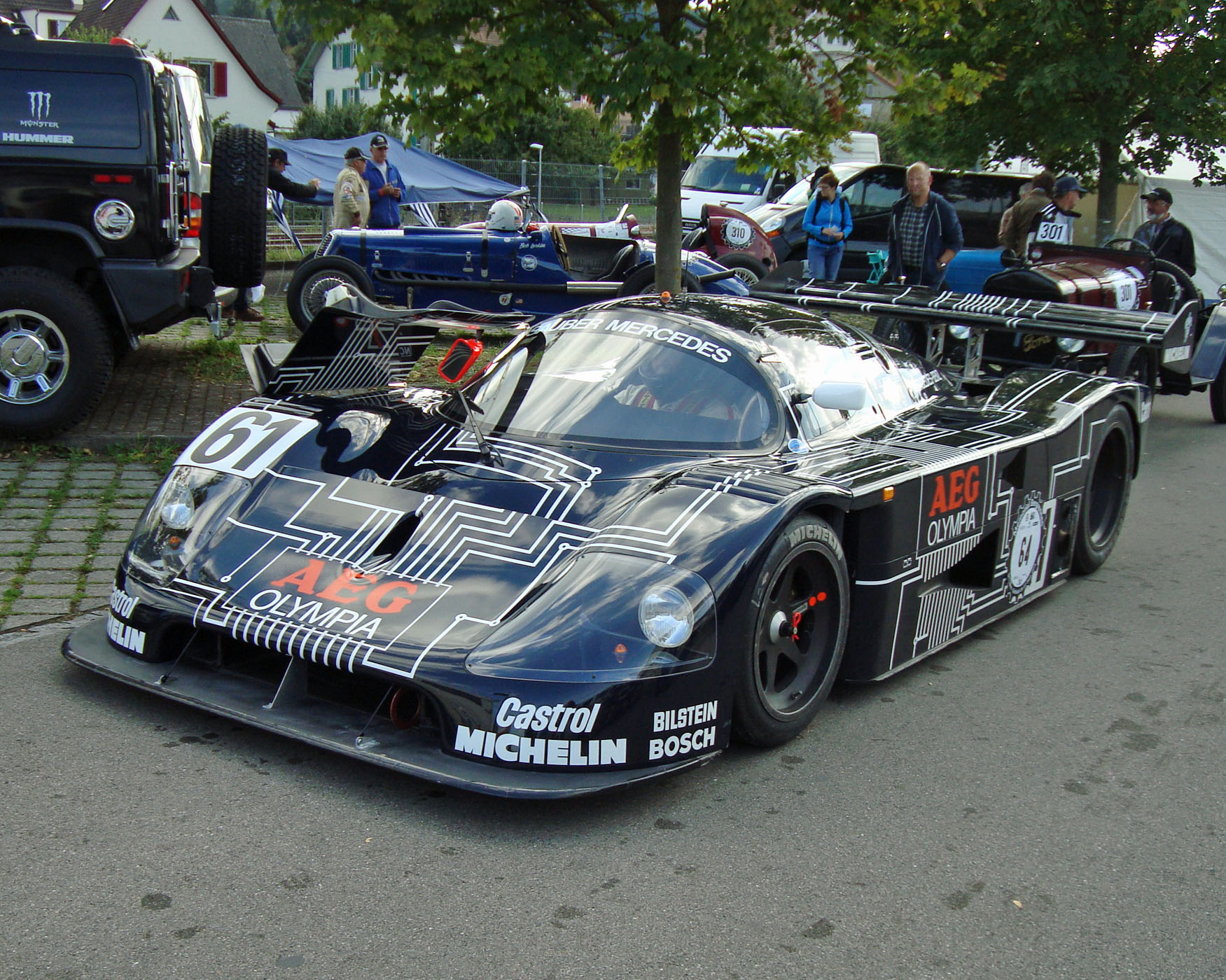
Sauber C9

An adage was that it took at least three attempts for a manufacturer to win Le Mans – as evidenced by Ford and Renault, and longer for Porsche, Matra and Aston Martin. The notable exception was Ferrari who won at their first attempt – the inaugural post-war Le Mans in 1949. This sentiment was acknowledged by Tom Walkinshaw himself – in charge of the Jaguar team operations. Following the example of Ferrari, Ford and Porsche themselves, this year Jaguar brought quantity as well as quality to the event, in their efforts to get the elusive victory. Tom Walkinshaw bought five cars and fourteen drivers to Le Mans. Their weapon this year would be the new XJR-9, designed by Tony Southgate. The car featured a number of aerodynamic and mechanical improvements, including a reduction of the air tunnels to meet the new regulations. Covers over the rear wheels contributed an estimated extra 10% to the downforce. Now fitted with a Zytek management system, TWR's engine-specialist, Allan Scott, was able to lift its output to 730 bhp with a top-speed 15 km/h faster than last year's car. Jaguar had entered this year's IMSA GTP series and to meet those regulations, was now sporting four 17" wheels all round. One of the IMSA cars was brought across to join the three WSC cars, along with a new chassis destined for the USA.

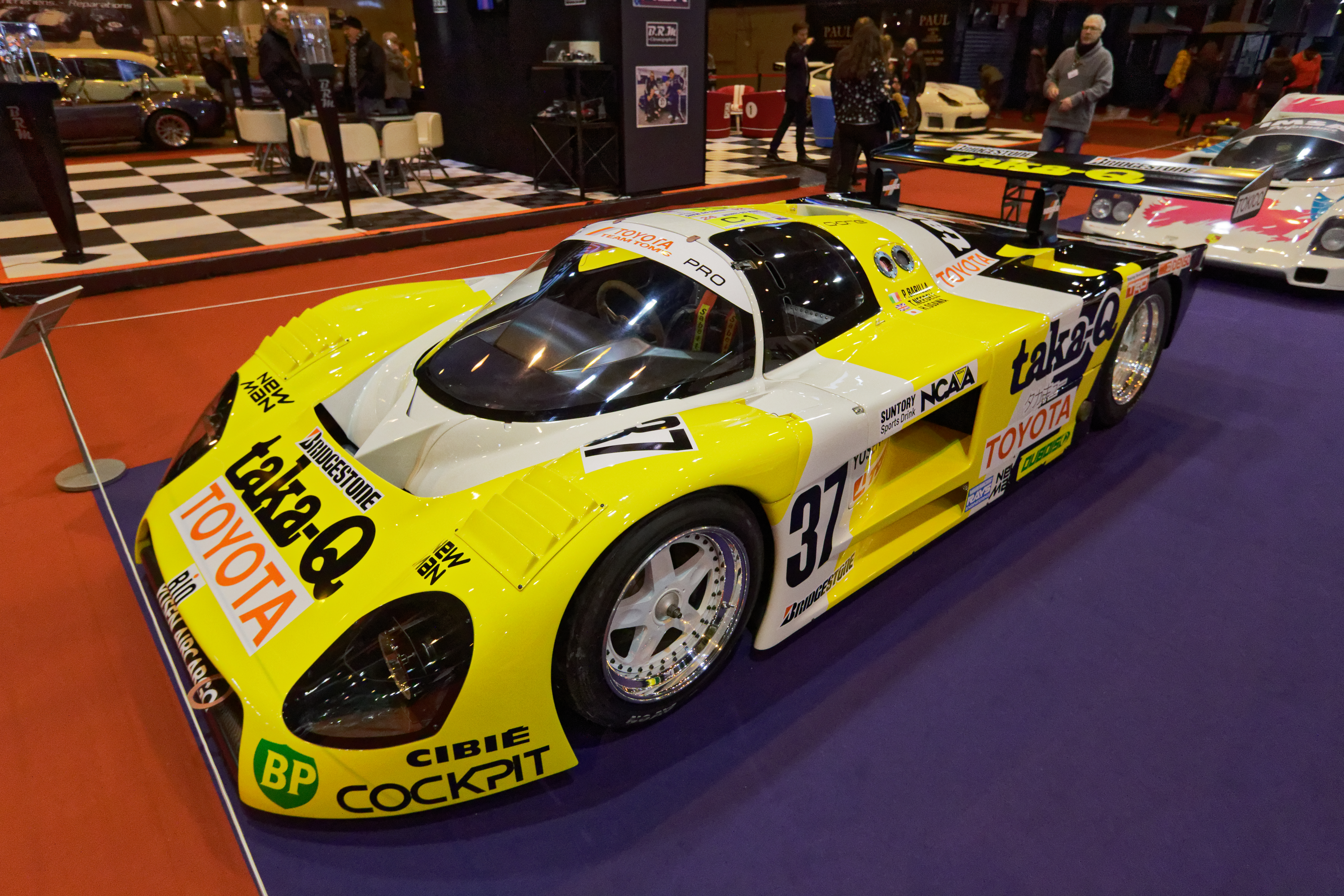
Toyota 88C

Eddie Cheever and Martin Brundle had won three of the four Championship rounds to date, but with Cheever unavailable due to Formula 1 commitments, Brundle was paired with John Nielsen. The second car now ran Jan Lammers with new team-members Johnny, Earl Dumfries and Andy Wallace, while the third car (fitted with an in-car camera) had 1987 champion Raul Boesel (now racing in the American CART series) and French veteran Henri Pescarolo join team regular John Watson. The IMSA chassis had the all-American crew of Price Cobb, Davy Jones and Team Penske lead-driver Danny Sullivan while the new chassis was given to Irishman Derek Daly, Australian Larry Perkins and American Kevin Cogan. Confidence on the cars reliability was gained when the XJR-9 finished first and third in the Daytona 24-hours, with victory going to Brundle/Nielson/Boesel.

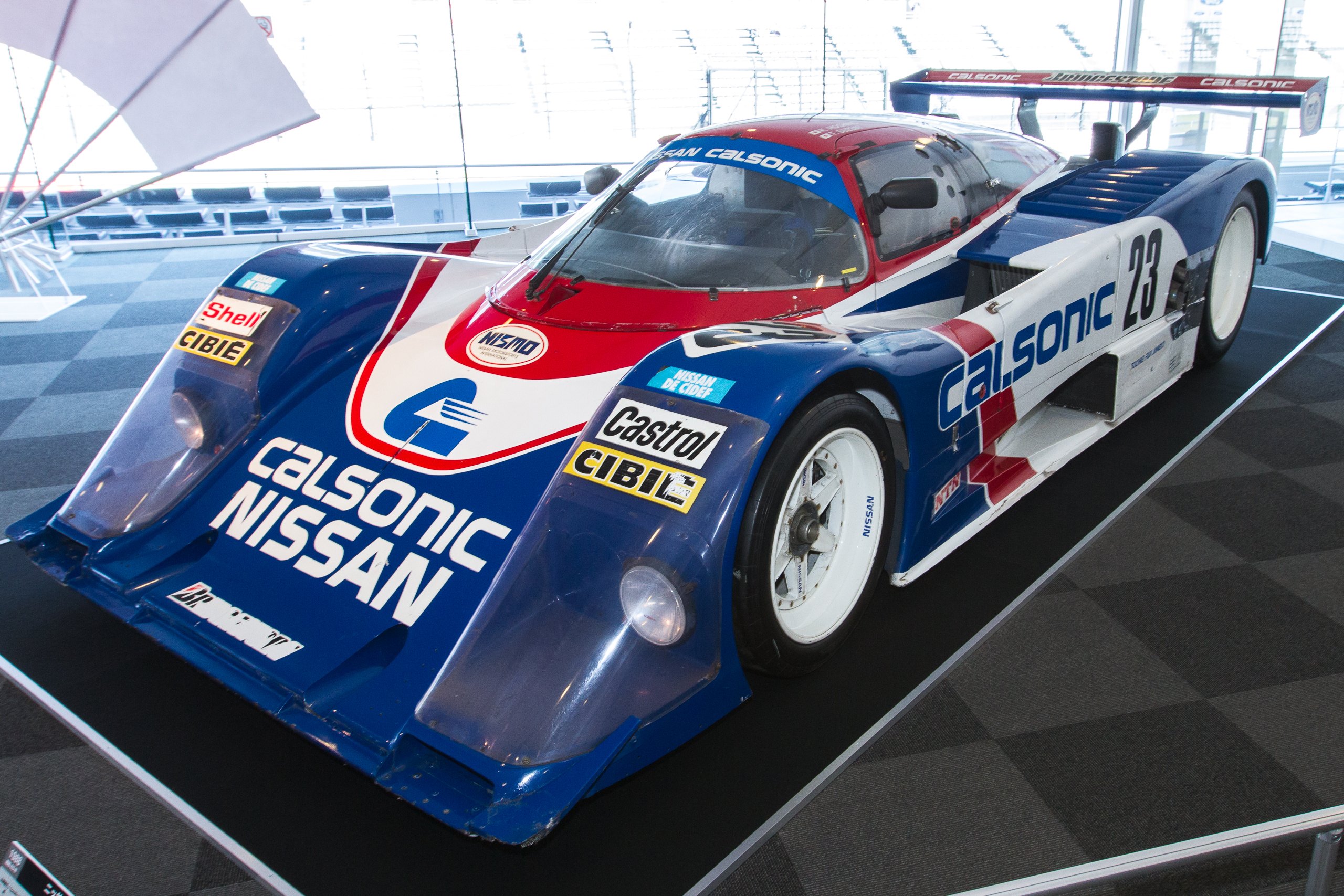
Nissan R88C

At the start of the year, Mercedes-Benz formally returned to motor-racing, in partnership with the Sauber team. The C9 design of Leo Ress got a major development, fine-tuning its aerodynamics and airflow with the new regulations. The refined 5.0-litre twin-turbo M117 engine could now put out well over 700 bhp. As a works project, a full team of engineers and personnel joined the pit-crew under new team manager Dave Price. The effects were immediate with strong results in the opening races from the improved reliability, including a victory at Jerez. Team regular, and current championship leader, Jean-Louis Schlesser considered the Hunaudières straight too dangerous, so his regular co-drivers Jochen Mass and Mauro Baldi were joined by James Weaver (whose usual ride with Richard Lloyd did not arrive. Mass was also cross-entered in the second car, with Klaus Niedzwiedz and Kenny Acheson. They were joined by Noël del Bello, and his older Sauber C8. He had recently received a pile of spare parts from Sauber and Mercedes-Benz, including the latest KKK (Kühnle, Kopp & Kausch) turbochargers. This boosted the car up to 355 km/h (220 mph). His co-drivers were Belgian Bernard de Dryver and Swiss Bernard Santal.

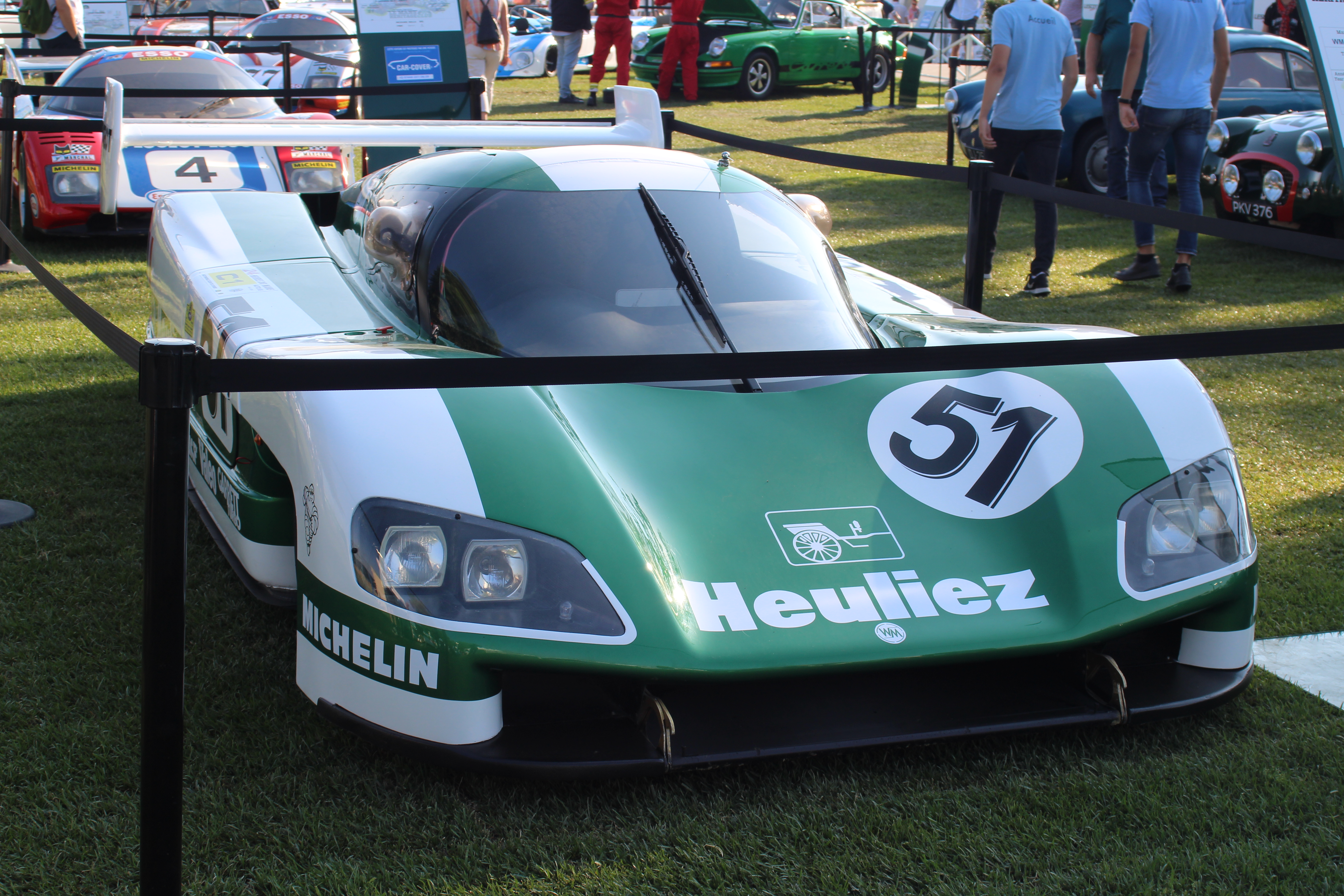
WM P88

Toyota had the new 88C model, built by Dome. It had been specifically designed around a new 3.2-litre turbo V8, but when that engine was not race-ready for Le Mans, they were retroactively fitted with the 1987 2.1-litre turbo-engine. Three cars were entered by TOM'S Racing although only two arrived. They would be driven by their regular combinations from the All Japan Endurance Championship: with Sekiya/Hoshino/Lees and Ogawa/Needell/Barilla. Nissan had done considerable work developing its March 87G chassis, now badged as the Nissan R88C. The VRH30 was essentially a new engine, with a lot of effort put in to resolve the cooling issues that plagued the VEJ30, with smaller turbos and a new cylinder block. The NISMO works team had two cars, one with works drivers Kazuyoshi Hoshino and Aguri Suzuki, joined by Takao Wada. The other had guest works-drivers Brit Win Percy and Australian Allan Grice, with Mike Wilds. There were also two cars again co-entered by the Japanese Team LeMans and Italya Sport teams. Using March chassis, they were fitted with 3.2-litre turbo VG30 engines prepared by NISMO.

Never in a position to challenge the big teams, the small WM Secateva team had always built its racing program around Le Mans. In recent years, their principal focus was to achieve something unique: to be the first team to reach 400 km/h on the Mulsanne straight. This could not be a target for race-winning teams as the fuel-consumption for such an engine would be prohibitive over 24 hours. The new design for the Projet Quatrecents was the P88, which had further aerodynamic refinements. The front and rear overhang were both shortened by 30cm and the internal venturi air funnels reduced. In this, they were assisted by specialist car maker, and co-sponsor, Heuliez. Denis Mathiot Compétition tuned the 2.9-litre engine, now fitted with twin Garrett turbos, to produce a massive 910 bhp. A new chassis was built while the previous year's P87 was adapted to the new specification. However, despite these updates, the cars were still heavier than the standard Porsche 962s with equivalent-sized engines, and over 40 kg more than the works Porsches.

Motivated by the third placing last year, Yves Courage's small local outfit proposed a major effort with five Cougar entries this year. The new C22 was purpose-built around the 2.8-litre Porsche engine unit, as used in the rival 962s. Small changes trimmed 40 kg off its weight compared to the C20. It would be run by François Migault, Paul Belmondo and Ukyo Katayama. A chassis from 1987 was lengthened slightly, and fitted with a 3.0-litre Porsche turbo, as the C20B. Its drivers would be Pierre-Henri Raphanel and 1987 European Touring Car champion Roberto Ravaglia. Two other C20 entries did not eventuate. The fifth car was an older C12 that Courage had bought back from its American owner. He converted it back to its original 1984 form and fitted a Cosworth DFL engine to enter it into the C2 class.

A surprising entry was the Lancia LC2, an echo from the past. Originally built in 1983, two had been purchased by privateer Gianni Mussato in 1986. One was written off in testing, so he sent the other to Dallara Automobili for upgrade and development. After an unsuccessful year, he sold the car to Swiss Jean-Pierre Frey and his Dollop Racing Team that had latterly been racing in Formula 3000. Former Alfa Romeo F1 engineer, Pierluigi Corbari, reworked the suspension, brakes and aerodynamics to improve its handling. With a 3-litre Ferrari engine it had a top speed of 340 km/h (210 mph). After a 2-year hiatus, Tim Lee Davey returned with his C1 turbo-Tiga experiment. He had installed twin Garrett turbochargers to a Cosworth DFL engine – which necessitated moving the radiators to the nose of the car to accommodate them.

=== Group C2 ===
Defending C2 champions, Spice Engineering arrived with the new SE88 car. It was designed by Graham Humphreys as a customer-car and thus had to be multi-purpose for a variety of circuits. Five C2 chassis were built and another six GTP for IMSA. It was given improved aerodynamics and a narrower cockpit, now capable of 330 km/h (205 mph). Two cars were entered by the works team, with one driven by owner/drivers Gordon Spice and Ray Bellm, joined by Pierre de Thoisy. One of the customer sales went to Jean-Louis Ricci, who employed Chamberlain Engineering to run it. Ricci arranged for French veterans Claude Ballot-Léna and Jean-Claude Andruet as his co-drivers. Chamberlain also had his own, older, RE86C car with its 1.9-litre turbocharged Hart engine, that could be wound up to 650 bhp to hit 350 km/h (215 mph). Cosmik GP Motorsport bought an ex-works SE87C for Anglo-Greek owner Costas Los and South African Wayne Taylor. The final Spice was the RE86C of Graff Racing. This was the class-winning car from last year's race, that Jean-Philippe Grand had recently bought off Hugh Chamberlain.

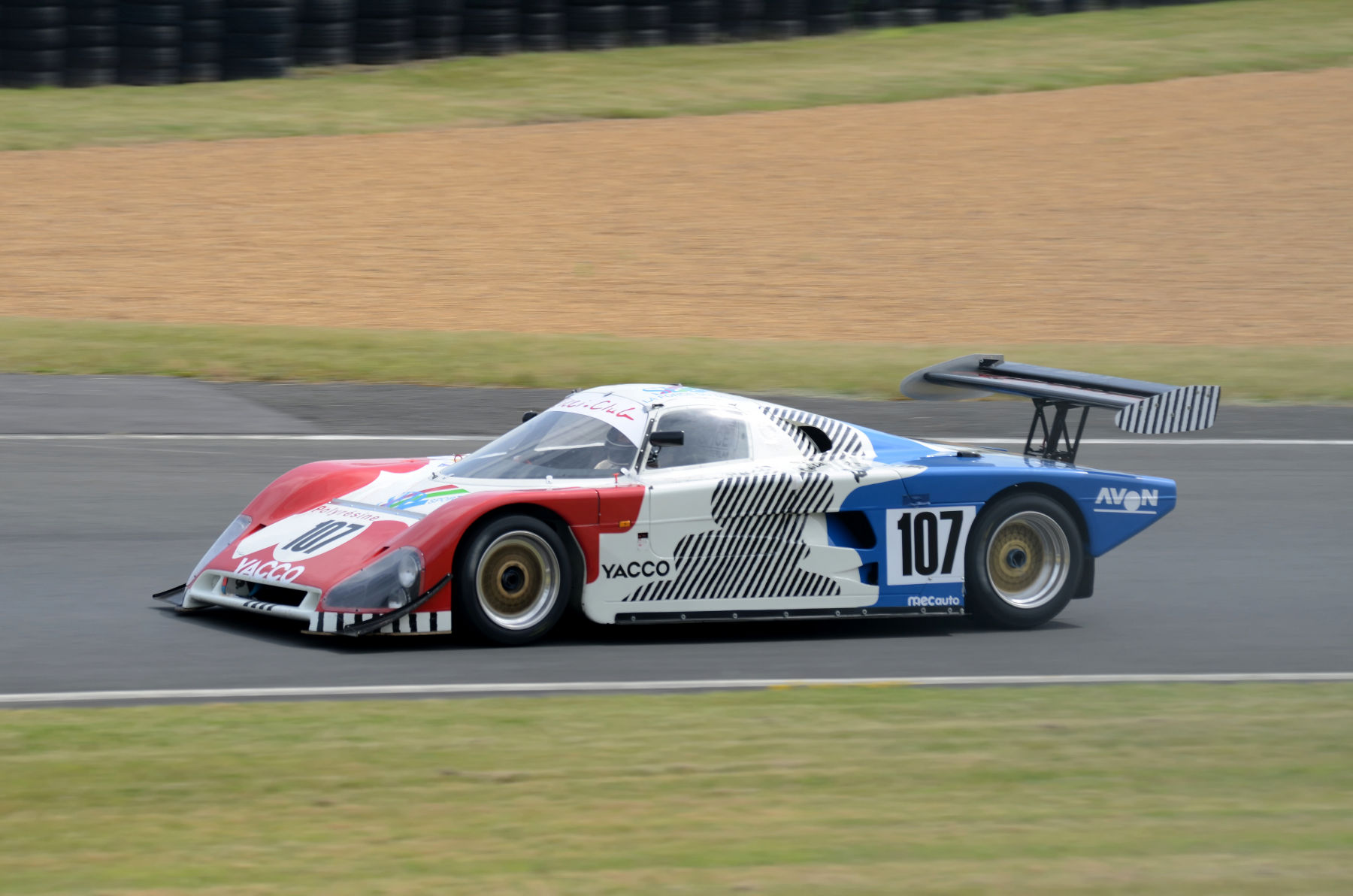
Chamberlain's Spice SE88C

The dominance of Spice was at the expense of Tiga Race Cars and although six of them were entered, only two arrived. Charles Ivey returned with his Porsche twin-turbo GC287. It would be driven by John Sheldon with first-timers Tim Harvey and Chris Hodgetts. Roy Baker brought over the GC286-Cosworth he had been running in IMSA, in its soft-pink livery, nicknamed the "Pink Panther". The team also fielded a large inflatable figure of the titular character, which they anchored to their fuelling rig and lit up at night. The limit of development of the 3.3-litre DFL could only get it up to 345 km/h (195 mph) which gave away too much top-line speed to keep up.

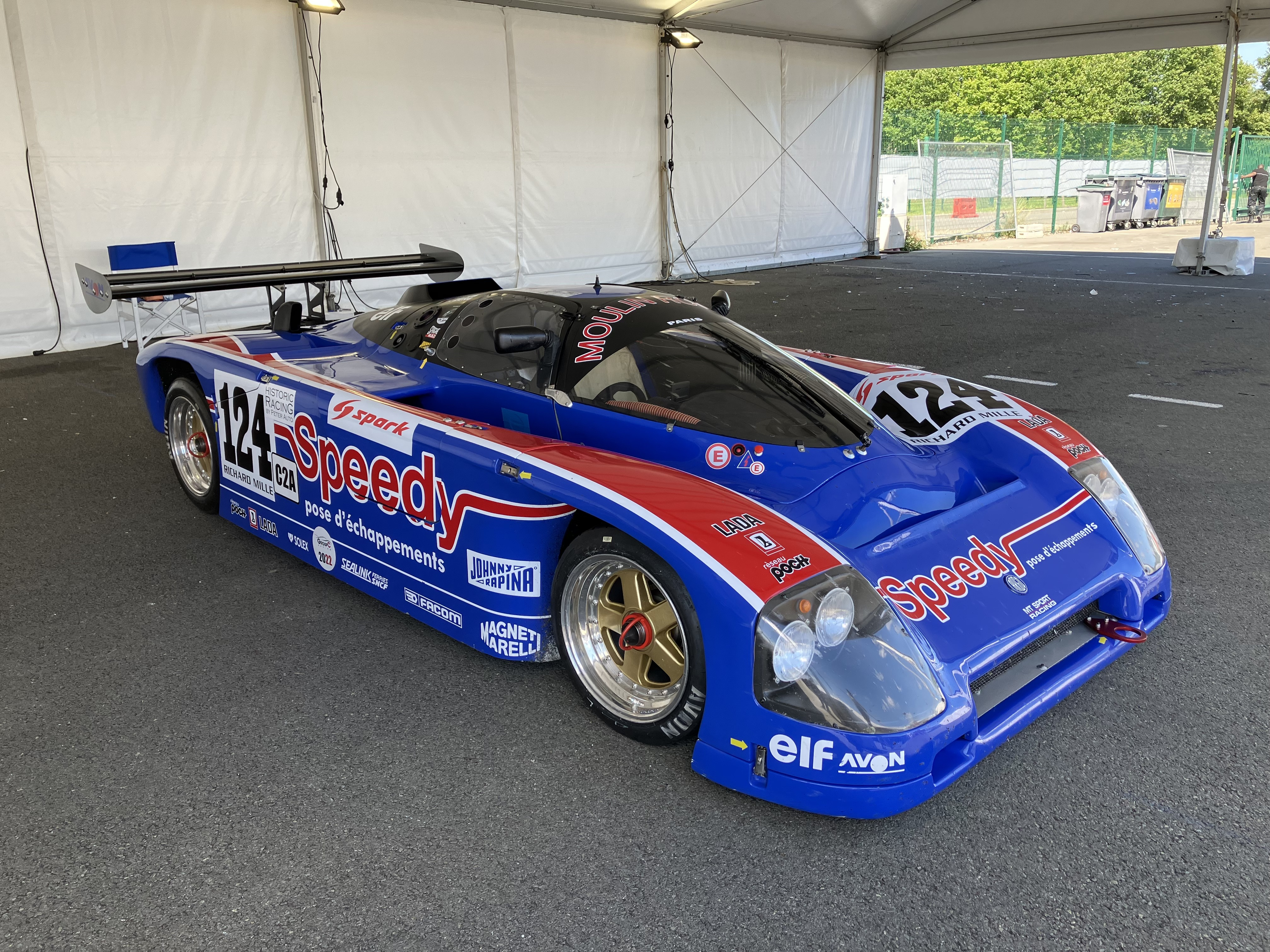
Argo JM19C

The Argo JM19 had been very successful in the IMSA series, particularly with the Mazda rotary engine. There were three of the cars entered in the C2 class, as the JM19C version, and all were fitted the 3.3-litre Cosworth DFL. The British PC Automotive team had entered a Royale-Alba in 1986, and Olindo Iacobelli raced it in 1987, but this year they converted to the Argo. Jean Massaoudi ran the racing school at Montlhéry and bought a new JM19C chassis. It was prepared by former Rondeau engineer Jean Montet, with an engine tuned by John Nicholson. Norwegian Rallycross champion Martin Schanche had raced an Argo with a Zakspeed turbo. However, after two years of unreliability he, too, converted to the Cosworth engine. He teamed up with Robin Smith again, and Robin Donovan.

The number of C2 privateer-builds was lower this year. ADA Engineering had lost its second chassis in an accident at the end of the '87 season. A new 03 chassis was ready for Le Mans, and owner Ian Harrower brought in Jiro Yoneyama and Hideo Fukuyama as co-drivers after their own Jiro entry was not ready. A sentimental entry admitted by the ACO was the final appearance at Le Mans of a Rondeau. Jean Rondeau, a Le Mans native, had the unique record of being the only person to win Le Mans in a car of his own company but had died in a road-accident in 1985. This M379C was built in 1979 as a works car before being sold to Jean-Philippe Grand. Now back for its tenth race, new owner, Swiss Pierre-Alan Lombardi, had veteran gentleman-racer Bruno Sotty join him as his co-driver. Another small French driver-constructor partnership was Louis Descartes and Jacques Heuclin. After a good race in 1987, they returned to Le Mans with two cars including a new model. The ALD 04 was 100 kg lighter than the 03, due to the greater use of Kevlar and a redesigned suspension. After a lack of success with the turbocharged Audi engine project, they reverted to the normally-aspirated 3.5-litre BMW engines. This improved its top speed up to 325 km/h (200 mph). However, unlike Rondeau, who focussed primarily on the great race, the ALD team was running full seasons in the World Championship. Their second car was held on the reserve list. Roland Bassaler had his SHS C6 for its fifth and final Le Mans. Ever the enthusiast, he gave his old workhorse a complete chassis makeover, getting it completed just in time for scrutineering, also sitting on the reserve list. The work was effective though, as the car could now get up to a top speed of 320 km/h (200 mph).

=== IMSA-GTP ===
Mazdaspeed had the IMSA-GTP class to itself when the two entries from the American Fabcar company did not eventuate. This year, a new model was presented – the Mazda 767, designed by Nigel Stroud. It was built around Mazda's new quad-rotor 13J-M Wankel engine. It put out around 600 bhp and despite the extra length from fitting the fourth rotor, the compactness of the motors made no difficulty to accommodate it. In fact, the new chassis overall was shorter and narrower with stronger reinforcement of the engine bay for better rigidity. With new aerodynamics, downforce was increased by 30% and although the new engine was heavier, the cars were still lighter than the Group C cars. Three cars came to Le Mans: last years drivers, Terada/Kennedy/Dieudonné had an older 757. Two of the new 767s went to the Japanese works drivers Yorino and Katayama. The former raced with Will Hoy and Hervé Regout and the latter with Marc Duez and David Leslie.

== Practice and Qualifying ==
The first sensation of qualifying was when the whole Jaguar team failed initial scrutineering. It was found their rear wings were mounted too far back and made the overall length of the cars an inch too long. An easy fix for the team, but an unnecessary distraction. The other sensation was the withdrawal of the fancied Sauber-Mercedes team. Testing at Monza had two serious tyre-blowouts at high speed. On Wednesday's second practice session, it happened again as Klaus Niedzwiedz went through the kink approaching the Mulsanne corner at 360 km/h (225 mph). Despite fishtailing down the road, Niedzwiedz kept it off the barriers and got back to the pits. Considerable damage to the suspension and bodywork had been done by the shredded tyre and the team could not tell if it was due to a puncture or structural failure. Mercedes, still very sensitive from their involvement in the 1955 Le Mans disaster (the last time they raced at Le Mans), took the decision to withdraw the team to prevent any possibility of such a catastrophe recurring.

Once again, the Porsche works team was untouchable and for the first time they lined up 1-2-3 on the grid, after a dominant first practice. It was Stuck who claimed pole with a blistering lap (3:15.6) fully five seconds faster than Wollek's pole time of the year before. The latter was second, after his laps were compromised passing traffic. Mario Andretti was just a thousandth of a second ahead of Brundle's Jaguar. Stuck's amazing lap in the very first session of qualifying quickly convinced Jaguar not to even bother trying to contest pole and to conserve their cars: the other four Jags were in the top dozen, interspersed between the leading Joest and Kremer Porsches - and the two Toyotas that were proving very competitive this year. In qualifying 8th (3:25.4), Geoff Lees was 9 seconds quicker than Toyota's best time in 1987.

There was a serious accident on Wednesday when Raphanel's Cougar lost its engine cover at full speed approaching the kink at Indianapolis. The car was fired into the barriers and wrecked, yet the team did an incredible job to have it ready again by Thursday afternoon. Co-driver Ravaglia, however, was very concerned and chose not to drive. His place was taken by French Formula 3000 driver Michel Ferté. Both of the super-fast WMs blew their turbos during practice. The team claimed that Roger Dorchy had hit 407 km/h on the Hunaudières straight. Unfortunately, the ACO's speed-camera was not working at the time and it could not be verified. The older P87 qualified 22nd (3:34.7) while the new P88 was a disappointing 36th (3:41.5). In GTP, the new Mazdas qualified 28th and 29th with 3:39 laps, six seconds faster than the team's best time last year.

The C2 class was rocked by the incredible lap put in by the Chamberlain Spice with its turbo engine. Nick Adams's time of 3:30.3 was ten seconds faster than they had achieved in 1987 and was good enough to put it 16th overall on the grid. Their nearest competitor was Gordon Spice's own car with a 3:37.8, starting 26th, with the Cosmik GP SE87 next 3:40.1 (30th) and not far behind, in 32nd (3:40.7) was the Charles Ivey Tiga. At the back of the grid was the old SH6, in off the reserve list with a qualifying lap of 4:06.7. In the Chamberlain Spice, American stuntman-driver Bobby Orr spun and stalled the car on his first flying lap. Instead of hitting the ignition switch he set off the inboard fire extinguishers. Chamberlain was so angry about it, he immediately replaced Orr with Richard Jones. In the C2 Cougar, Thierry Lecerf was too slow to be qualified, so the car would only be raced by his co-drivers, Patrick de Radiguès and Moroccan Max Cohen-Olivar.

== Race ==
=== Start ===
Over 50,000 British fans had arrived for the race, spurred on by Jaguar's prospects. This swelled the crowd to 260,000, the biggest for the decade. At the earlier 3pm start, on a hot afternoon, Stuck vaulted from the pole position into the lead. Lammers, from sixth on the grid, muscled past the other works cars into second place by the end of the first lap. That just provoked them and the four of them set a strong pace. Lammers took the lead on the sixth lap and, in fact, all four held the lead at some time in the opening shift. The other Jaguars were prowling near, running 5, 6, 8 and 9 after the first hour. The first hiccup was right on the hour when Nielsen planted his car into the gravel at Indianapolis, losing two laps. At 5.30pm, Ludwig lost minutes as he almost ran out of fuel in the Porsche Curves, just managing to get back to the pits, but dropping two laps and falling down to ninth. It was later found to be due to a blocked fuel filter, that stopped the last third of the tank being accessed.

The only serious accident in the race happened at 8.15pm, when Ukyo Katayama lost control of his Cougar in the high-speed Porsche Curves. It flipped over the guard barrier, into the catch-fencing, and burst into flames. Katayama emerged unhurt but severely in shock. He was left literally speechless – unable to speak in the hospital for two days. Later in the night, the other Cougar also had a fire, when fuel was spilt during a pit-stop. Burning through the electrics put them out the race.

A notable piece of history was made in the mid-evening. The WM team was having a poor race; with the second car already out having broken its CV-joint leaving the pit-lane. The new car had been delayed by a number of problems including the cooling, electronics, fuel pump and distributor. With the night cooling down, at 9:30pm they brought the P88 back into the pits for a do-or-die attempt at the speed record. Every space was taped over to minimise air resistance, and with the twin-turbos wound up to over 900 bhp, Roger Dorchy took the car out with only a couple of laps to make the attempt, and was officially clocked at a record-breaking 405 km/h (252 mph) on the back straight. The engine, starved of cooling air, blew up - but a milestone had been reached – the first car to break 400 km/h at Le Mans.

As night fell, at 11pm after seven hours, the Wollek/Schuppan/van der Merwe Porsche was leading the Lammers/Dumfries/Wallace Jaguar with the Andretti Porsche in third the only other car on the lead lap. The recovering works cars of Bell/Stuck/Ludwig and Brundle/Nielsen were 4th and 5th respectively, often travelling close together as they climbed back up the rankings. Replacing the fuel pump in the Porsche finally solved their fuel problems. Strong driving by Derek Bell going into the night had got the car into third and onto the leaders' lap by midnight (although it cost them valuable fuel consumption). The other three Jaguars (6th, 7th and 9th) and the two Joest Porsches filled out the rest of the top-10. The Japanese Group C cars had qualified well, but issues had dropped them out of contention.

In the C2 class, Wayne Taylor initially had a good lead (running 11th overall after one hour) until waylaid by a seized wheelbearing. Dane Thorkild Thyrring moved into the class-lead in the second works Spice, until the rear bodywork blew off when Eliseo Salazar was travelling at speed and they, in turn, lost half an hour. This brought the pole-sitting Chamberlain Spice to the front of the class. Ricci had been delayed early on when a short-circuit set off the internal fire extinguishers, but after that Ballot-Léna had driven back up through the field. Meanwhile, the Spice/Bellm/de Thoisy car had been delayed by a faulty fuel-pump and a puncture but by 7pm they had moved up to the top of the class, from where they would not be headed.

=== Night ===
In the first half of the race, the lead had changed 22 times between those leading four cars. For nine hours, the Wollek and Lammers cars had vied for the lead, never more than half a lap apart and thrilling the spectators. At times only seconds apart, weaving on the straights to try and break each other's slipstreams, and using the slower cars to eke out small gaps. Gradually issues started cropping up for the leaders: Boesel retired the first Jaguar after 11pm, having stopped at Arnage unable to find any gears. The American Jaguar lost three hours through the night having a gearbox and clutch rebuild. Then at 2:45, Wollek suddenly slowed and brought his Porsche into the pits to retire – a severed fuel line had starved the engine and burnt our three valves of the flat-six engine. In his 18th Le Mans, it was another failure for Wollek, retiring from a potential winning position.

Therefore, at the halfway point of 3am, the Jaguar had a solid lead. However, Bell, Stuck and Ludwig were driving hard, in second, and all through the night, their relentless pursuit continued. At midnight, John Andretti had lost three laps (falling to sixth) getting a water-pump replaced. The family had got back to fourth by 4am, when Mario pulled in with a chronic misfire. Losing three-quarters of an hour, Michael took it out running on five cylinders in tenth spot, but they survived and eventually finished sixth.

=== Morning ===
At dawn, the two leading Jaguars sandwiched the works Porsche, with the Joest car lurking near enough in fourth. Around 6.30am, Lammers had the misfortune to hit a bird and had to pit to have a new windscreen fitted. This allowed the Porsche to take the lead, but only for a lap, as Stuck pitted straight away and team manager Peter Falk got the water-pump replaced as a precaution. Brundle and Nielsen had also been charging hard and briefly got into second during that interlude. It would not last though, and when Nielsen pitted with steam blowing out the engine soon after 10am, they had to retire with a blown head-gasket. At breakfast time, the Andretti Porsche suffered a similar problem to the sister-car and lost three cylinders, but managed to get going again albeit dropping more laps.

Then at 11am, to complicate a tight situation, a light shower made the track wet and slippery. This sent the cars diving for the pits for their intermediate tyres, as it was heavier on the Mulsanne than on the main straight. However, it was just enough to ease the speed of the leaders and remove concerns on fuel consumption. With no significant period behind the safety cars, the relentless pace had made it a reasonable concern for a time. Stuck used all his skill as a wet-weather expert to start reeling in the Jaguar. By midday, with the track drying, the Jaguar was able to extend its legs and maintain a gap of around three minutes.

Outside of the C1 class, the GTP Mazdas were in a close tussle with the C2-leading works Spice and the other Japanese cars: at breakfast, Katayama's 767 was running 13th ahead of the Lees Toyota and Spice/Bellm. The other two Mazdas were next, ahead of the two Nissans with the Lancia rounding out the top-20. Then it all fell apart for Mazda – just before 7am, both 767s came into the pits with broken exhausts and water pumps, losing several hours each with the repairs. The Nissan of Hoshino/Wada/Suzuki had lost an hour overnight changing ignitions leads causing a misfire. They had resumed in 41st place but had steadily worked their way back through the field, all the way up to 14th until around 11am when a broken exhaust valve ended their race.

=== Finish and post-race ===
At 12.45, the Porsche came into the pits to replace the fuel-filter again, allowing the Lammers/Dumfries/Wallace Jaguar to get a consistent one-lap. Then with only forty minutes to go, the gearbox broke on the Jaguar. Lammers felt a vibration immediately before it jumped out of gear, and mindful of the warning that Boesel had given him about what happened with his car, was able to slam the car into fourth gear and carry on. He also had the presence of mind not to attempt to change gear for the rest of the race, but still had a final fuel stop to make. However, by slipping the clutch and getting a shove from his pit-crew, he was able to get moving. With a quarter-hour (4 laps) to go, under instruction from Walkinshaw, the other two remaining Jaguars lined up for a formation finish. They were also there to protect their leader's back, and even punt him across the line if necessary if the gearbox completely gave up. Unaware of the peril the wounded Jaguar was in, at the Porsche's last stop with a half-hour to go, Ludwig was told to save the car and conserve fuel. Going onto the final lap, the gap was only 100 seconds. However, Lammers was able to get home to take the victory in front of a euphoric British crowd who swarmed onto the track. The Porsche was about half a lap behind, with only 1½ litres of fuel left. Officially, the margin of victory was given as 180 metres – either way, it was one of the closest competitive-margins ever at Le Mans.

Jaguar had finally broken the stranglehold that Porsche had had on the race – which they had won for the previous seven years in a row. Andy Wallace became only the fifth man to win Le Mans on debut. The winning chassis #488 had not completed a race yet in the world championship, but found reliability at just the right time. With no safety-car periods, the race distance was only a lap shy of breaking the 1971 race distance record (less than 3 km).

The Joest Porsche was third, nine laps back, waiting in vain for the works cars to falter. The car went eleven laps further than their winning car in 1985. The American-based Jaguar of Daly/Perkins/Cogan was a further two laps back in fourth after an untroubled run. The other Jaguar, of Sullivan/Jones/Cobb finished 7th after having the whole rear suspension replaced not once, but twice, to fix an untraceable rear vibration. The reliability of the 962C was proven again with 9 of the 11 entered cars finishing, and all those were in the top dozen places. In finishing 11th, the Obermaier Racing team went 22 laps further than when they had finished second the previous year. The Japanese teams fared better this year, with the lead Toyota coming home 12th and Nissan in 14th while all three Mazdas finishing in the GTP class (15th, 17th and 19th). It was the older 757 that led the team home (covering 18 laps further than in 1987) after the dual delays to the sister cars.

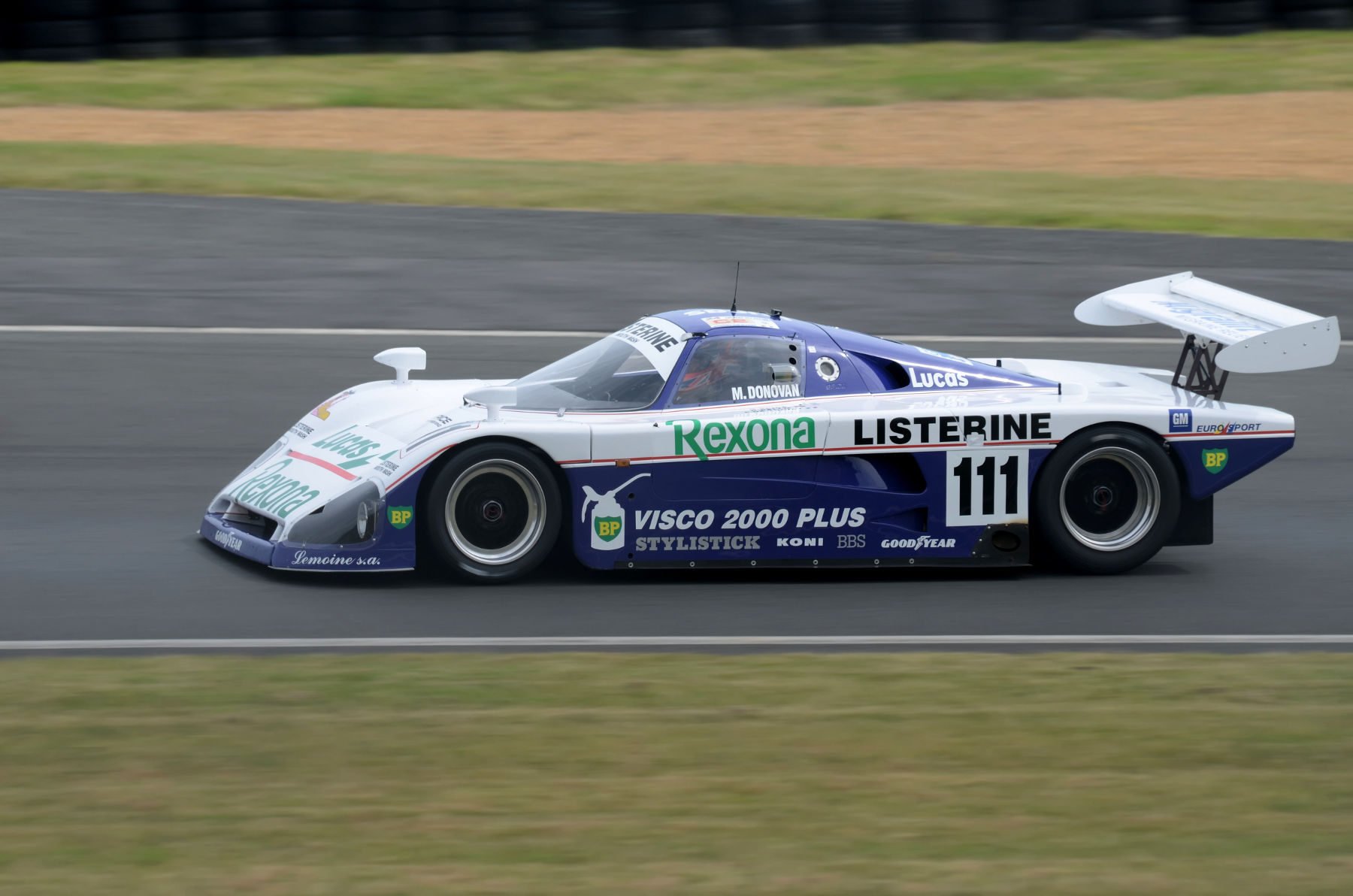
The C2 class winner: Spice Engineering

The works Spice team ran reliably finishing 13th, unlike so many of their rivals, and cruised to a 33-lap (480 km) win in the C2 class. They almost caught the Toyota, and their only hindrance had been two pitstops in the first hour to fix blown fuses, and a driver's door left open. Their sister car had been running third in class, chasing the ADA team. However, soon after midday it was retired when the engine broke. The ADA had pitted after the formation lap to get a new ignition box fitted, but after that had run extremely reliably and finished a distant, but deserved, second-in-class. Not classified was the Rondeau. Sadly, in its farewell race, it had a troubled run. Electrical issues cost several hours during the night, and then in the morning another hour was lost replacing a rear suspension upright and gear selector. Despite a reliable drive after that, and running at the finish, Lombardi was just 5 laps short of the necessary 70% distance-mark to be classified.

The success of the WM-Peugeot was capitalised on by the parent company, who named their new sporty hatchback the "405" in honour of the milestone achievement. They went on to win four of the remaining six races in the championship. It was the first year in the Group C era (starting in 1982) that a Porsche had not won a single Championship race. Jaguar retained its Championship, not least due to the treble points for the Le Mans victory.

At the end of the year, FISA announced its new format for the World Championship: it would be 12 races. Apart from the 24 hours at Le Mans, the other races would be 400-500km length to fit TV coverage. There would also be a 2-year transition to a new generation of 3.5-litre engines. While a number of manufacturers expressed interest, Porsche took the opposite view – announcing their full works withdrawal from sports-car racing and the end of its support for their customer teams.

== Official results ==
=== Finishers ===
Results taken from Quentin Spurring's book, officially licensed by the ACO
Class Winners are in Bold text.

Pos	Class	No.	Team	Drivers	Chassis	Engine	Tyre	Laps
1	**Gr.C1**	**2**	**(United Kingdom) Silk Cut Jaguar**	**(Netherlands) Jan Lammers** **(United Kingdom) Johnny Dumfries** **(United Kingdom) Andy Wallace**	Jaguar XJR-9LM	Jaguar 7.0L V12	D	394
2	Gr.C1	17	(West Germany) Porsche AG	(United Kingdom) Derek Bell (West Germany) Hans-Joachim Stuck (West Germany) Klaus Ludwig	Porsche 962C	Porsche 935/82 3.0L F6 twin turbo	D	394
3	Gr.C1	8	(West Germany) Blaupunkt Joest Racing	(Sweden) Stanley Dickens (West Germany) Frank Jelinski (West Germany) "John Winter" (Louis Krages)	Porsche 962C	Porsche 935/79 2.8L F6 twin turbo	G	385
4	Gr.C1	22	(United Kingdom) Silk Cut Jaguar	(Republic of Ireland) Derek Daly (Australia) Larry Perkins (United States) Kevin Cogan	Jaguar XJR-9LM	Jaguar 7.0L V12	D	383
5	Gr.C1	7	(West Germany) Blaupunkt Joest Racing	(United Kingdom) David Hobbs (Belgium) Didier Theys (Austria) Franz Konrad	Porsche 962C	Porsche 935/79 2.8L F6 twin turbo	G	380
6	Gr.C1	19	(West Germany) Porsche AG	(United States) Mario Andretti (United States) Michael Andretti (United States) John Andretti	Porsche 962C	Porsche 935/82 3.0L F6 twin turbo	D	375
7	Gr.C1	5	(Switzerland) Repsol Brun Motorsport	(Spain) Jesús Pareja (Italy) Massimo Sigala (West Germany) Uwe Schäfer	Porsche 962C	Porsche 935/82 3.0L F6 twin turbo	M	372
8	Gr.C1	11	(West Germany) Leyton House; Kremer Racing	(Denmark) Kris Nissen (West Germany) Harald Grohs (South Africa) George Fouché	Porsche 962C	Porsche 935/82 3.0L F6 twin turbo	Y	371
9	Gr.C1	10	(Germany) Kenwood Kremer Racing	(Italy) Bruno Giacomelli (Japan) Kunimitsu Takahashi (Japan) Hideki Okada	Porsche 962C-K6	Porsche 935/79 2.8L F6 twin turbo	Y	370
10	Gr.C1	33	(Australia) Takefuji Schuppan; Racing Team	(United Kingdom) Brian Redman (France) Jean-Pierre Jarier (Sweden) Eje Elgh	Porsche 962C	Porsche 935/82 3.0L F6 twin turbo	D	359
11	Gr.C1	72	(West Germany) Obermaier Racing (France) Primagaz Compétition	(West Germany) Jürgen Lässig (France) Pierre Yver (United Kingdom) Dudley Wood	Porsche 962C	Porsche 935/79 2.8L F6 twin turbo	G	356
12	Gr.C1	36	(Japan) Toyota Team TOM'S	(United Kingdom) Geoff Lees (Japan) Masanori Sekiya (Japan) Kaoru Hoshino	Toyota 88C	Toyota 3S-GTM 2.1L S4 turbo	B	351
13	**Gr.C2**	**111**	**(United Kingdom) BP Spice Engineering**	**(United Kingdom) Gordon Spice** **(United Kingdom) Ray Bellm** **(France) Pierre de Thoisy**	Spice-Fiero SE88C	Cosworth DFL 3.3 L V8	G	351
14	Gr.C1	32	(Japan) Nissan Motorsports; International	(United Kingdom) Win Percy (Australia) Allan Grice (United Kingdom) Mike Wilds	Nissan R88C	Nissan VRH30T 3.0L V8 twin turbo	B	344
15	**IMSA**; **GTP**	**203**	**(Japan) Mazdaspeed**	**(Japan) Yojiro Terada** **(Republic of Ireland) David Kennedy** **(Belgium) Pierre Dieudonné**	Mazda 757	Mazda 13G 1962cc triple-rotary	D	337
16	Gr.C1	21	(United Kingdom) Silk Cut Jaguar	(United States) Danny Sullivan (United States) Davy Jones (United States) Price Cobb	Jaguar XJR-9LM	Jaguar 7.0L V12	D	331
17	IMSA; GTP	201	(Japan) Mazdaspeed	(Japan) Yoshimi Katayama (United Kingdom) David Leslie (Belgium) Marc Duez	Mazda 767	Mazda 13J-M 2.6L quad-rotary	D	330
18	Gr.C2	115	(United Kingdom) ADA Engineering	(United Kingdom) Ian Harrower (Japan) Jiro Yoneyama (Japan) Hideo Fukuyama	ADA 03	Cosworth DFL 3.3 L V8	G	318
19	IMSA; GTP	202	(Japan) Mazdaspeed	(Japan) Takashi Yorino (Belgium) Hervé Regout (United Kingdom) Will Hoy	Mazda 767	Mazda 13J-M 2.6L quad-rotary	D	305
20	Gr.C2	123	(United Kingdom) Charles Ivey Team Istel	(United Kingdom) John Sheldon (United Kingdom) Tim Harvey (United Kingdom) Chris Hodgetts	Tiga GC287	Porsche 935 2.8L F6 twin turbo	D	301
21	Gr.C2	124 reserve	(France) MT Sport Racing (private entrant)	(France) Pierre-François Rousselot (France) Jean Messaoudi (France) Jean-Luc Roy	Argo JM19C	Cosworth DFL 3.3 L V8	A	300
22	Gr.C2	177	(France) Automobiles; Louis Descartes (private entrant)	(France) Louis Descartes (France) Jacques Heuclin (France) Dominique Lacaud	ALD 04	BMW M88 3.5L S6	A	294
23	Gr.C2	198	(United Kingdom) Roy Baker Racing	(United Kingdom) David Andrews (United States) Steve Hynes (United States) Mike Allison	Tiga GC286	Cosworth DFL 3.3 L V8	D	294
24	Gr.C1	37	(Japan) Toyota Team TOM'S	(Japan) Hitoshi Ogawa (Italy) Paolo Barilla (United Kingdom) Tiff Needell	Toyota 88C	Toyota 3S-GTM 2.1L S4 turbo	B	283
25	Gr.C2	117	(Norway) Lucky Strike Schanche; Racing (private entrant)	(Norway) Martin Schanche (United Kingdom) Robin Smith (United Kingdom) Robin Donovan	Argo JM19C	Cosworth DFL 3.3 L V8	G	278
N/C*	Gr.C2	113	(France) Courage Compétition (France) Primagaz Compétition	(Morocco) Max Cohen-Olivar (Belgium) Patrick de Radiguès	Cougar C12	Cosworth DFL 3.3 L V8	A	273
N/C*	Gr.C2	151	(Switzerland) P.-A. Lombardi (private entrant)	(Switzerland) Pierre-Alain Lombardi (France) Bruno Sotty	Rondeau M379C	Cosworth DFV 3.0 L V8	A	271

- Note *: Not Classified because did not cover sufficient distance (70% of the winner) by the race's end.

=== Did not finish ===
Pos	Class	No	Team	Drivers	Chassis	Engine	Tyre	Laps	Reason
DNF	Gr.C1	1	(United Kingdom) Silk Cut Jaguar	(United Kingdom) Martin Brundle (Denmark) John Nielsen	Jaguar XJR-9LM	Jaguar 7.0L V12	D	306	Engine (20hr)
DNF	Gr.C1	23	(Japan) Nissan Motorsports; International	(Japan) Kazuyoshi Hoshino (Japan) Takao Wada (Japan) Aguri Suzuki	Nissan R88C	Nissan VRH30T 3.0L V8 twin turbo	B	286	Engine (22hr)
DNF	Gr.C2	103	(United Kingdom) BP Spice Engineering	(Denmark) Thorkild Thyrring (Chile) Eliseo Salazar (Italy) Almo Coppelli	Spice-Fiero SE88C	Cosworth DFL 3.3 L V8	G	281	Engine (22hr)
DNF	Gr.C2	131	(France) Graff Racing (France) J.-P. Grand (private entrant)	(France) Jean-Philippe Grand (France) Jacques Terrien (France) Maurice Guenoun	Spice-Fiero SE86C	Cosworth DFL 3.3 L V8	A	263	Engine (22hr)
DNF	Gr.C1	24	(Italy) Dollop Racing	(Switzerland) Jean-Pierre Frey (Italy) Nicola Marozzo (Italy) Ranieri Randaccio	Lancia LC2	Ferrari 308C 3.1L V8 twin turbo	D	255	Engine (21hr)
DNF	Gr.C2	127	(United Kingdom) Chamberlain Engineering	(United Kingdom) Nick Adams (Republic of Ireland) Martin Birrane (United Kingdom) Richard Jones	Spice-Fiero SE86C	Hart 418T 1873cc S4 turbo	A	223	Gearbox (19hr)
DNF	Gr.C1	18	(West Germany) Porsche AG	(France) Bob Wollek (Australia) Vern Schuppan (South Africa) Sarel van der Merwe	Porsche 962C	Porsche 935/82 3.0L F6 twin turbo	D	192	Engine (13hr)
DNF	Gr.C1	42	(France) N. del Bello (private entrant)	(France) Noël del Bello (Belgium) Bernard de Dryver (Switzerland) Bernard Santal	Sauber C8	Mercedes-Benz M117; 5.0L V8 twin turbo	G	157	Engine (13hr)
DNF	Gr.C2	121	(United Kingdom) Cosmik GP Motorsport	(Greece) Costas Los (South Africa) Wayne Taylor (United Kingdom) Evan Clements	Spice-Fiero SE87C	Cosworth DFL 3.3 L V8	G	145	Clutch (12hr)
DNF	Gr.C2	191	(United Kingdom) PC Automotive (private entrant)	(United States) Olindo Iacobelli (Canada) John Graham (France) Alain Ianette	Argo JM19C	Cosworth DFL 3.3 L V8	G	130	Electrics (13hr)
DNF	Gr.C1	3	(United Kingdom) Silk Cut Jaguar	(France) Henri Pescarolo (United Kingdom) John Watson (Brazil) Raul Boesel	Jaguar XJR-9LM	Jaguar 7.0L V12	D	129	Gearbox (10hr)
DNF	Gr.C1	13	(France) Courage Compétition (France) Primagaz Compétition	(France) Pierre-Henri Raphanel (France) Michel Ferté	Cougar C20B	Porsche 935/82 3.0L F6 twin turbo	M	120	Fire (10hr)
DNF	Gr.C2	178 reserve	(France) Automobiles; Louis Descartes (private entrant)	(France) Michel Lateste (France) Gérard Tremblay (France) Sylvain Boulay	ALD 03	BMW M88 3.5L S6	A	103	Engine (10hr)
DNF	Gr.C1	4	(Switzerland) Camel Brun Motorsport	(West Germany) Manuel Reuter (Austria) Walter Lechner (Switzerland) Franz Hunkeler	Porsche 962C	Porsche 935/82 3.0L F6 twin turbo	M	91	Accident (8hr)
DNF	Gr.C1	85	(Japan) Italya Cabin (Japan) Team LeMans Co	(Japan) Toshio Suzuki (United States) Danny Ongais (France) Michel Trollé	Nissan R87S	Nissan VG30ET 3.2L V6 twin turbo	Y	74	Engine (6hr)
DNF	Gr.C1	86	(Japan) Italya Cabin (Japan) Team LeMans Co	(Sweden) Anders Olofsson (Italy) Lamberto Leoni (Japan) Akio Morimoto	Nissan R88S	Nissan VG30ET 3.2L V6 twin turbo	Y	69	Engine (6hr)
DNF	Gr.C1	30	(France) Courage Compétition (France) Primagaz Compétition	(Japan) Ukyo Katayama (France) François Migault (France) Paul Belmondo	Cougar C22	Porsche 935/79 2.8L F6 twin turbo	M	66	Accident (6hr)
DNF	Gr.C1	51	(France) WM Secateva	(France) Roger Dorchy (France) Jean-Daniel Raulet (Switzerland) Claude Haldi	WM P88	Peugeot PRV ZNS4 2.9L; V6 twin-turbo	M	59	Engine (12hr)
DNF	Gr.C2	132 reserve	(France) R. Bassaler (private entrant)	(France) Roland Bassaler (France) Jean-François Yvon (France) Remy Pochauvin	Sauber SHS C6	BMW M88 3.5L S6	A	53	Engine (6hr)
DNF	Gr.C1	52	(France) WM Secateva	(France) Pascal Pessiot (France) Jean-Daniel Raulet (Switzerland) Claude Haldi	WM P87	Peugeot PRV ZNS4 3.0L; V6 twin-turbo	M	22	Gearbox (5hr)
DNF	Gr.C2	107	(United Kingdom) Chamberlain Engineering	(France) Jean-Claude Andruet (France) Claude Ballot-Léna (France) Jean-Louis Ricci	Spice-Fiero SE88C	Cosworth DFL 3.3 L V8	A	17	Engine (5hr)
DNF	Gr.C1	20	(United Kingdom) Team Davey (private entrant)	(United Kingdom) Tim Lee-Davey (United Kingdom) Tom Dodd-Noble	Tiga GC88	Cosworth DFL 3.3L V8 twin turbo	D	5	Electrics (5hr)

=== Did not start ===
Pos	Class	No	Team	Drivers	Chassis	Engine	Tyre	Reason
DNS	Gr.C2	181	(Italy) Luigi Taverna; Techno Racing (private entrant)	(Italy) Luigi Taverna (Italy) Fabio Magnani (Italy) Roberto Ragazzi	Olmas GLT-200	Cosworth DFL 3.3 L V8	A	Engine
DNS	Gr.C1	61	(Switzerland) Team Sauber Mercedes	(West Germany) Jochen Mass (Italy) Mauro Baldi (United Kingdom) James Weaver	Sauber C9	Mercedes-Benz M117; 5.0L V8 twin turbo	M	Withdrawn
DNS	Gr.C1	62	(Switzerland) Team Sauber Mercedes	(West Germany) Klaus Niedzwiedz (United Kingdom) Kenny Acheson (West Germany) Jochen Mass	Sauber C9	Mercedes-Benz M117; 5.0L V8 twin turbo	M	Practice Accident
DNA	Gr.C1	14	(United Kingdom) Richard Lloyd Racing		Porsche 962C GTi	Porsche 935/79 2.8L F6 twin turbo	G	Did not arrive
DNA	Gr.C1	15	(United Kingdom) Richard Lloyd Racing		Porsche 962C GTi	Porsche 935/82 3.0L F6 twin turbo	G	Did not arrive
DNA	Gr.C1	35	(Austria) Walter Lechner Racing School (private entrant)	(Austria) Walter Lechner (Austria) Ernst Franzmaier	Porsche 962C	Porsche 935/79 2.8L F6 twin turbo		Did not arrive
DNA	Gr.C1	38	(Japan) Toyota Team TOM'S		Toyota 88C	Toyota 3S-GTM 2.1L S4 turbo	B	Did not arrive
DNA	Gr.C1	40	(Switzerland) Swiss Team Salamin (private entrant)	(Switzerland) Antoine Salamin (Switzerland) Enzo Calderari (Morocco) Max Cohen-Olivar	Porsche 962C	Porsche 935/79 2.8L F6 twin turbo		Did not arrive
DNA	Gr.C1	41	(France) Bussi Racing (private entrant)	(France) Christian Bussi	Rondeau M382	Cosworth DFL 3.3 L V8		Did not arrive
DNA	Gr.C1	73	(France) Courage Compétition (France) Primagaz Compétition	(France) Pierre-Henri Raphanel (Italy) Roberto Ravaglia	Cougar C20	Porsche 935/79 2.8L F6 twin turbo	M	Did not arrive
DNA	Gr.C1	74	(France) Courage Compétition (France) Primagaz Compétition	(Belgium) Hervé Regout (France) Thierry Lecerf	Cougar C20	Porsche 935/79 2.8L F6 twin turbo	M	Did not arrive
DNA	Gr.C2	101	(Italy) Dollop Racing	(Switzerland) Jean-Pierre Frey (Italy) Nicola Marozzo	Argo JM19B	Motori Moderni 2000cc V6 turbo	D	Did not arrive
DNA	Gr.C2	106	(Italy) Kelmar Racing (private entrant)	(Italy) Pasquale Barberio (Italy) Vito Veninata (Italy) Ranieri Randaccio	Tiga GC288	Cosworth DFL 3.3 L V8		Did not arrive
DNA	Gr.C2	114	(France) J. Thibault (private entrant)	(France) José Thibault	Chevron B36 Coupé	ROC-Talbot 2.5L S4		Did not arrive
DNA	Gr.C2	134	(United Kingdom) American Alloy Engines (private entrant)	(Sweden) Slim Borgudd	Tiga GC286	Cosworth GA 3.4L V6		Did not arrive
DNA	Gr.C2	140	(United Kingdom) Dune Motorsport (private entrant)	(United Kingdom) Duncan Bain (United Kingdom) John Sheldon (Italy) Massimo Sigala (France) Pierre Pagani	Tiga GC287	Austin-Rover V64V 3.0L V6	A	Did not arrive
DNA	Gr.C2	171	(Japan) Jiro Motor Racing (private entrant)	(Japan) Jiro Yoneyama (Japan) Hideo Fukuyama	Jiro JTK 63C	Cosworth DFL 3.3 L V8		Did not arrive
DNA	IMSA; GTX	204	(United States) Road Circuit Technology (United States) Roush Racing	(United States) Les Delano (United States) Andy Petery	Ford-Merkur XR4Ti	Ford Lima 2.3L S4 turbo		Did not arrive
DNA	IMSA; GTP	205	(United States) Fabcar Engineering		Fabcar CL	Porsche Type-901 3.2L F6	G	Did not arrive
DNA	IMSA; GTP	206	(United States) Fabcar Engineering		Fabcar CL	Porsche Type-901 3.2L F6	G	Did not arrive

=== Class winners ===
Class	Winning car	Winning drivers
Group C1	#2 Jaguar XJR-9LM	Lammers / Wallace / Dumfries *
Group C2	#111 Spice-Fiero SE88C	Spice / Bellm / Thoisy *
IMSA-GTP	#203 Mazda 757	Terada / Dieudonné / Kennedy *
Note *: setting a new class distance record.

=== Index of Energy Efficiency ===
Pos	Class	No	Team	Drivers	Chassis	Score
1	Gr.C1	17	(West Germany) Porsche AG	(United Kingdom) Derek Bell (West Germany) Hans-Joachim Stuck (West Germany) Klaus Ludwig	Porsche 962C	1.371
2	Gr.C1	2	(United Kingdom) Silk Cut Jaguar	(Netherlands) Jan Lammers (United Kingdom) Johnny, Earl Dumfries (United Kingdom) Andy Wallace	Jaguar XJR-9LM	1.359
3	Gr.C1	22	(United Kingdom) Silk Cut Jaguar	(Republic of Ireland) Derek Daly (Australia) Larry Perkins (United States) Kevin Cogan	Jaguar XJR-9LM	1.216
4	Gr.C2	111	(United Kingdom) BP Spice Engineering	(United Kingdom) Gordon Spice (United Kingdom) Ray Bellm (France) Pierre de Thoisy	Spice-Fiero SE88C	1.214
5	Gr.C1	19	(West Germany) Porsche AG	(United States) Mario Andretti (United States) Michael Andretti (United States) John Andretti	Porsche 962C	1.186
6	Gr.C1	21	(United Kingdom) Silk Cut Jaguar	(United States) Danny Sullivan (United States) Davy Jones (United States) Price Cobb	Jaguar XJR-9LM	1.141
7	Gr.C1	7	(West Germany) Blaupunkt Joest Racing	(United Kingdom) David Hobbs (Belgium) Didier Theys (Austria) Franz Konrad	Porsche 962C	1.131
8	Gr.C1	11	(West Germany) Leyton House Kremer Racing	(Denmark) Kris Nissen (West Germany) Harald Grohs (South Africa) George Fouché	Porsche 962C	1.121
9	Gr.C1	8	(West Germany) Blaupunkt Joest Racing	(Sweden) Stanley Dickens (West Germany) Frank Jelinski (West Germany) "John Winter"	Porsche 962C	1.114
10	Gr.C2	115	(United Kingdom) ADA Engineering	(United Kingdom) Ian Harrower (Japan) Jiro Yoneyama (Japan) Hideo Fukuyama	ADA 03	1.091

- Note: Only the top ten positions are included in this set of standings.

=== Statistics ===
Taken from Quentin Spurring's book, officially licensed by the ACO

- Pole Position – H.-J. Stuck, #17 Porsche 962C– 3:15.6secs; 250.2 km/h (155.5 mph)
- Fastest Lap – H.-J. Stuck, #17 Porsche 962C– 3:22.5secs; 240.6 km/h (149.5 mph)
- Winning Distance – 5,332.97 km (3,313.75 mi)
- Winner's Average Speed – 221.8 km/h (137.8 mph)
- Attendance – 260,000-280,000

== Notes ==
World Sportscar Championship
Previous race: 1988 1000km of Silverstone	1988 season	Next race: 1988 360km of Brno
