= 1988 All Japan Sports Prototype Car Endurance Championship =

Seasons
- ← 1987 1989 →

The 1988 All Japan Sports Prototype Car Endurance Championship was the sixth season of the All Japan Sports Prototype Championship. The 1988 champion was the #27 From A Racing Porsche 962C driven by Hideki Okada.

== Schedule ==
All races were held in Japan.

Round	Race	Circuit	Date
1	Fuji 500 km	Fuji Speedway	3 March
2	Suzuka 500 km	Suzuka Circuit	10 April
3	All Japan Fuji 1000 km	Fuji Speedway	1 May
4	JAF Grand Prix All Japan Fuji 500 Miles	Fuji Speedway	24 July
5	International Suzuka 1000 km	Suzuka Circuit	28 August
6	WEC-Japan	Fuji Speedway	9 October

== Entry list ==
=== C/LD-1 ===
- For the WEC-Japan event, JSPC teams used different car numbers to avoid conflicts with the car numbers of the entrants of the World Sportscar Championship; each car's WEC-Japan race number is displayed in tooltips.

Team	Make	Car	Engine	No.	Drivers	Tyre	Rounds
Alpha Nova Racing	Porsche	Porsche 962C	Porsche 935/82 3.0 L Twin Turbo F6	1	(Japan) Kunimitsu Takahashi	Y	All
Alpha Nova Racing	Porsche	Porsche 962C	Porsche 935/82 3.0 L Twin Turbo F6	1	(Japan) Kazuo Mogi	Y	All
Auto Beaurex Motorsport	Toyota	TOM'S 86C	Toyota 3S-GT 2.1 L Turbo I4	3	(Sweden) Steven Andskär	D	1–3
Auto Beaurex Motorsport	Toyota	TOM'S 86C	Toyota 3S-GT 2.1 L Turbo I4	3	(United Kingdom) Andrew Gilbert-Scott	D	1–3
Auto Beaurex Motorsport	Toyota	Toyota 87C	Toyota 3S-GT 2.1 L Turbo I4	3	(Sweden) Steven Andskär	D	4–6
Auto Beaurex Motorsport	Toyota	Toyota 87C	Toyota 3S-GT 2.1 L Turbo I4	3	(United Kingdom) Andrew Gilbert-Scott	D	4–6
Leyton House Racing	Porsche	Porsche 962C	Porsche 935/82 3.0 L Twin Turbo F6	15	(Japan) Kaoru Hoshino	B	All
Leyton House Racing	Porsche	Porsche 962C	Porsche 935/82 3.0 L Twin Turbo F6	15	(Japan) Masahiko Kageyama	B	All
Leyton House Racing	Porsche	Porsche 962C	Porsche 935/82 3.0 L Twin Turbo F6	15	(Japan) Naoki Nagasaka	B	1–4, 6
Leyton House Racing	Porsche	Porsche 962C	Porsche 935/82 3.0 L Twin Turbo F6	16	(Denmark) Kris Nissen	B	1–4
Leyton House Racing	Porsche	Porsche 962C	Porsche 935/82 3.0 L Twin Turbo F6	16	(Germany) Harald Grohs	B	1–2
Leyton House Racing	Porsche	Porsche 962C	Porsche 935/82 3.0 L Twin Turbo F6	16	(Italy) Bruno Giacomelli	B	3–6
Leyton House Racing	Porsche	Porsche 962C	Porsche 935/82 3.0 L Twin Turbo F6	16	(Japan) Naoki Nagasaka	B	5
Leyton House Racing	Porsche	Porsche 962C	Porsche 935/82 3.0 L Twin Turbo F6	16	(Argentina) Oscar Larrauri	B	6
Nissan Motorsports	Nissan	Nissan R88C	Nissan VRH30T 3.0 L Twin Turbo V8	23	(Japan) Kazuyoshi Hoshino	B	All
Nissan Motorsports	Nissan	Nissan R88C	Nissan VRH30T 3.0 L Twin Turbo V8	23	(Japan) Kenji Takahashi	B	All
Nissan Motorsports	Nissan	Nissan R88C	Nissan VRH30T 3.0 L Twin Turbo V8	23	(United Kingdom) Win Percy	B	3
Nissan Motorsports	Nissan	Nissan R88C	Nissan VRH30T 3.0 L Twin Turbo V8	23	(Japan) Toshio Suzuki	B	5
Nissan Motorsports	Nissan	Nissan R88C	Nissan VRH30T 3.0 L Twin Turbo V8	23	(Australia) Allan Grice	B	6
Nissan Motorsports	Nissan	Nissan R88C	Nissan VRH30T 3.0 L Twin Turbo V8	32	(Japan) Masahiro Hasemi	B	All
Nissan Motorsports	Nissan	Nissan R88C	Nissan VRH30T 3.0 L Twin Turbo V8	32	(Japan) Aguri Suzuki	B	All
Nissan Motorsports	Nissan	Nissan R88C	Nissan VRH30T 3.0 L Twin Turbo V8	32	(Australia) Allan Grice	B	3
Team Schuppan	Porsche	Porsche 962C	Porsche 935/82 3.0 L Twin Turbo F6	25	(Sweden) Eje Elgh	D	All
Team Schuppan	Porsche	Porsche 962C	Porsche 935/82 3.0 L Twin Turbo F6	25	(Brazil) Maurizio Sandro Sala	D	All
From A Racing	Porsche	Porsche 962C	Porsche 935/82 3.0 L Twin Turbo F6	27	(Japan) Hideki Okada	B	All
From A Racing	Porsche	Porsche 962C	Porsche 935/82 3.0 L Twin Turbo F6	27	(Sweden) Stanley Dickens	B	All
Toyota Team TOM'S	Toyota	Toyota 88C	Toyota 3S-GT 2.1 L Turbo I4	36	(United Kingdom) Geoff Lees	B	1–3
Toyota Team TOM'S	Toyota	Toyota 88C	Toyota 3S-GT 2.1 L Turbo I4	36	(Japan) Masanori Sekiya	B	1–3
Toyota Team TOM'S	Toyota	Toyota 88C	Toyota 3S-GT 2.1 L Turbo I4	36	(Japan) Keiichi Suzuki	B	3
Toyota Team TOM'S	Toyota	Toyota 88C-V	Toyota R32V 3.2 L Turbo V8	36	(United Kingdom) Geoff Lees	B	4–6
Toyota Team TOM'S	Toyota	Toyota 88C-V	Toyota R32V 3.2 L Turbo V8	36	(Japan) Masanori Sekiya	B	4–6
Toyota Team TOM'S	Toyota	Toyota 88C-V	Toyota R32V 3.2 L Turbo V8	36	(Japan) Keiichi Suzuki	B	4–6
Toyota Team TOM'S	Toyota	Toyota 88C	Toyota 3S-GT 2.1 L Turbo I4	37	(Italy) Paolo Barilla	B	1–5
Toyota Team TOM'S	Toyota	Toyota 88C	Toyota 3S-GT 2.1 L Turbo I4	37	(United Kingdom) Tiff Needell	B	1, 3–5
Toyota Team TOM'S	Toyota	Toyota 88C	Toyota 3S-GT 2.1 L Turbo I4	37	(Sweden) Stefan Johansson	B	2
Toyota Team TOM'S	Toyota	Toyota 88C	Toyota 3S-GT 2.1 L Turbo I4	37	(Japan) Hitoshi Ogawa	B	3–5
Toyota Team TOM'S	Toyota	Toyota 88C-V	Toyota R32V 3.2 L Turbo V8	37	(Italy) Paolo Barilla	B	6
Toyota Team TOM'S	Toyota	Toyota 88C-V	Toyota R32V 3.2 L Turbo V8	37	(Sweden) Stefan Johansson	B	6
Toyota Team TOM'S	Toyota	Toyota 88C-V	Toyota R32V 3.2 L Turbo V8	37	(Japan) Hitoshi Ogawa	B	6
SARD	SARD	SARD MC88S	Toyota 4T-GT 2.1 L Turbo I4	50	(Japan) Shuroku Sasaki	D	All
SARD	SARD	SARD MC88S	Toyota 4T-GT 2.1 L Turbo I4	50	(Japan) Tsunehisa Asai	D	1–5
SARD	SARD	SARD MC88S	Toyota 4T-GT 2.1 L Turbo I4	50	(Germany) Jochen Dauer	D	6
SARD	SARD	SARD MC88S	Toyota 4T-GT 2.1 L Turbo I4	50	(United Kingdom) Martin Donnelly	D	6
Omron Racing	Porsche	Porsche 962C	Porsche 935/82 3.0 L Twin Turbo F6	55	(United States) Price Cobb	D	1, 3–6
Omron Racing	Porsche	Porsche 962C	Porsche 935/82 3.0 L Twin Turbo F6	55	(United Kingdom) Kenny Acheson	D	1–5
Omron Racing	Porsche	Porsche 962C	Porsche 935/82 3.0 L Twin Turbo F6	55	(Italy) Emanuele Pirro	D	2
Omron Racing	Porsche	Porsche 962C	Porsche 935/82 3.0 L Twin Turbo F6	55	(Germany) Klaus Ludwig	D	6
Person's Racing	March	March 86G; March 88G	Nissan VG30ET 3.0 L Twin Turbo V6	85	(Sweden) Anders Olofsson	Y	1–5
Person's Racing	March	March 86G; March 88G	Nissan VG30ET 3.0 L Twin Turbo V6	85	(Japan) Takao Wada	Y	1–5
Person's Racing	March	March 86G; March 88G	Nissan VG30ET 3.0 L Twin Turbo V6	85	(Japan) Toshio Suzuki	Y	3, 6
Person's Racing	March	March 86G; March 88G	Nissan VG30ET 3.0 L Twin Turbo V6	85	(Japan) Akio Morimoto	Y	4–6
Team LeMans	March	March 88G	Nissan VG30ET 3.0 L Twin Turbo V6	86	(Sweden) Anders Olofsson	Y	6
Team LeMans	March	March 88G	Nissan VG30ET 3.0 L Twin Turbo V6	86	(Japan) Takao Wada	Y	6
Trust Racing	Porsche	Porsche 962C	Porsche 935/82 3.0 L Twin Turbo F6	99	(Japan) Keiichi Suzuki	D	1
Trust Racing	Porsche	Porsche 962C	Porsche 935/82 3.0 L Twin Turbo F6	99	(Austria) Franz Konrad	D	1
Trust Racing	Porsche	Porsche 962C	Porsche 935/82 3.0 L Twin Turbo F6	100	(Australia) Vern Schuppan	D	All
Trust Racing	Porsche	Porsche 962C	Porsche 935/82 3.0 L Twin Turbo F6	100	(South Africa) George Fouché	D	All
Trust Racing	Porsche	Porsche 962C	Porsche 935/82 3.0 L Twin Turbo F6	100	(South Africa) Sarel van der Merwe	D	6
Mazdaspeed	Mazda	Mazda 757; Mazda 767	Mazda RE13G 2.0 L 3-rotor Mazda RE13J 2.6 L 4-rotor	201	(Japan) Takashi Yorino	D	2–6
Mazdaspeed	Mazda	Mazda 757; Mazda 767	Mazda RE13G 2.0 L 3-rotor Mazda RE13J 2.6 L 4-rotor	201	(Japan) Yoshimi Katayama	D	2–6
Mazdaspeed	Mazda	Mazda 757; Mazda 767	Mazda RE13G 2.0 L 3-rotor Mazda RE13J 2.6 L 4-rotor	201	(Japan) Yojiro Terada	D	2–3, 5
Mazdaspeed	Mazda	Mazda 757; Mazda 767	Mazda RE13G 2.0 L 3-rotor Mazda RE13J 2.6 L 4-rotor	201	(Belgium) Pierre Dieudonné	D	4, 6
Mazdaspeed	Mazda	Mazda 757; Mazda 767	Mazda RE13G 2.0 L 3-rotor Mazda RE13J 2.6 L 4-rotor	202	(Japan) Yojiro Terada	D	1, 4, 6
Mazdaspeed	Mazda	Mazda 757; Mazda 767	Mazda RE13G 2.0 L 3-rotor Mazda RE13J 2.6 L 4-rotor	202	(Republic of Ireland) David Kennedy	D	1, 4, 6
Mazdaspeed	Mazda	Mazda 757; Mazda 767	Mazda RE13G 2.0 L 3-rotor Mazda RE13J 2.6 L 4-rotor	207	(Japan) Takashi Yorino	D	1
Mazdaspeed	Mazda	Mazda 757; Mazda 767	Mazda RE13G 2.0 L 3-rotor Mazda RE13J 2.6 L 4-rotor	207	(Japan) Yojiro Terada	D	1
Shizumatsu Racing	Mazda	Mazda 757	Mazda RE13G 2.0 L 3-rotor	230	(Japan) Shuji Fujii	D	All
Shizumatsu Racing	Mazda	Mazda 757	Mazda RE13G 2.0 L 3-rotor	230	(Japan) Tetsuji Shiratori	D	1, 3–6
Shizumatsu Racing	Mazda	Mazda 757	Mazda RE13G 2.0 L 3-rotor	230	(Japan) Terumitsu Fujieda	D	2–4, 6
Shizumatsu Racing	Mazda	Mazda 757	Mazda RE13G 2.0 L 3-rotor	230	(Japan) Kaoru Iida	D	5

=== B/LD-2 ===
Team	Make	Car	Engine	No.	Drivers	Tyre	Rounds
Cactus Racing	MCS	MCS Guppy	BMW M12/7 2.0 L I4	30	(Japan) Iwao Sugai	D	4
Cactus Racing	MCS	MCS Guppy	BMW M12/7 2.0 L I4	30	(Japan) Hiroshi Sugai	D	4
Unicorn Racing	MCS	MCS Guppy	Mazda RE13B 1.3 L 2-rotor	101	(Japan) Masami Shirai	Y	1–2
Unicorn Racing	MCS	MCS Guppy	Mazda RE13B 1.3 L 2-rotor	101	(Japan) Shunji Abe	Y	1–2
British Barn Racing Team	British Barn	British Barn JTK 63C	Ford DFL 3.3 L V8	151	(Japan) Jiro Yoneyama	D	All
British Barn Racing Team	British Barn	British Barn JTK 63C	Ford DFL 3.3 L V8	151	(Japan) Kiyoshi Misaki	D	1, 5–6
British Barn Racing Team	British Barn	British Barn JTK 63C	Ford DFL 3.3 L V8	151	(Japan) Hideo Fukuyama	D	2–6
British Barn Racing Team	British Barn	British Barn JTK 63C	Ford DFL 3.3 L V8	151	(Japan) Hisatoyo Goto	D	3

=== A/LD-3 ===
Team	Make	Car	Engine	No.	Drivers	Tyre	Rounds
Fujitsubo	Hiro	Hiro HRS-3	Mazda RE13B 1.3 L 2-rotor	2	(Japan) Kozo Okumura	B	5
Fujitsubo	Hiro	Hiro HRS-3	Mazda RE13B 1.3 L 2-rotor	2	(Japan) Tomiko Yoshikawa	B	5
Mazda Auto Nishi Tokyo	Mazda	Mazda RX-7 254	Mazda RE13B 1.3 L 2-rotor	5	(Japan) Toshihiro Fukuzawa	D	4
Mazda Auto Nishi Tokyo	Mazda	Mazda RX-7 254	Mazda RE13B 1.3 L 2-rotor	5	(Japan) Shigeru Miura	D	4
West Racing Cars	West	West 87S	Mazda RE13B 1.3 L 2-rotor	6	(Japan) Seiichi Sodeyama	D	2
West Racing Cars	West	West 87S	Mazda RE13B 1.3 L 2-rotor	6	(Japan) Yoshiyuki Ogura	D	2
West Racing Cars	West	West 87S	Mazda RE13B 1.3 L 2-rotor	6	(Japan) Tomokazu Tomimasu	D	5
West Racing Cars	West	West 87S	Mazda RE13B 1.3 L 2-rotor	6	(Japan) Hiroaki Ishii	D	5
West Racing Cars	West	West 87S	Mazda RE13B 1.3 L 2-rotor	6	(Japan) Shigeo Torige	D	5
Chubu Jidosha Racing	Toyota	Toyota Corolla Levin	Toyota 4A 1.6 L I4	6	(Japan) Masami Ishikawa	D	4
Chubu Jidosha Racing	Toyota	Toyota Corolla Levin	Toyota 4A 1.6 L I4	6	(Japan) Toshiro Shiino	D	4
Chubu Jidosha Racing	Toyota	Toyota Corolla Levin	Toyota 4A 1.6 L I4	6	(Japan) Naozumi Ito	D	4
Moditt Racing Team	West	West 87S	Mazda RE13B 1.3 L 2-rotor	7	(Japan) Ryuichi Natsukawa	D	5
Moditt Racing Team	West	West 87S	Mazda RE13B 1.3 L 2-rotor	7	(Japan) Toshihiko Nogami	D	5
Moditt Racing Team	West	West 87S	Mazda RE13B 1.3 L 2-rotor	7	(Japan) Junichi Ikura	D	5
Keiichi Kosaka	West	West 85S	Mazda RE13B 1.3 L 2-rotor	9	(Japan) Keiichi Kosaka	D	2
Keiichi Kosaka	West	West 85S	Mazda RE13B 1.3 L 2-rotor	9	(Japan) Masayoshi Furuya	D	2
Keiichi Kosaka	West	West 85S	Mazda RE13B 1.3 L 2-rotor	9	(Japan) Soichiro Tanaka	D	2
RS Yamada	West	West 83S-II	Mazda RE13B 1.3 L 2-rotor	14	(Japan) Junji Okada	D	2
RS Yamada	West	West 83S-II	Mazda RE13B 1.3 L 2-rotor	14	(Japan) Mitsuo Yamamoto	D	2
ERC	Oscar	Oscar SK85	Mazda RE13B 1.3 L 2-rotor	17	(Japan) Ryosuke Nozaki	D	5
ERC	Oscar	Oscar SK85	Mazda RE13B 1.3 L 2-rotor	17	(Japan) Seiichi Sodeyama	D	5
ERC	Oscar	Oscar SK85	Mazda RE13B 1.3 L 2-rotor	17	(Japan) Masami Miyoshi	D	5
Goro Suzuki (Note: Competed as #48 in Rd. 2)	Oscar	Oscar SK85	Mazda RE13B 1.3 L 2-rotor	21	(Japan) Keiichi Mizutani	D	2, 5
Goro Suzuki	Oscar	Oscar SK85	Mazda RE13B 1.3 L 2-rotor	21	(Japan) Norizaki Tomiyasu	D	2, 5
Goro Suzuki	Oscar	Oscar SK85	Mazda RE13B 1.3 L 2-rotor	21	(Japan) Keiichi Kosaka	D	5
Cactus Racing	Mazda	Mazda RX-7 254	Mazda RE13B 1.3 L 2-rotor	30	(Japan) Iwao Sugai	D	1, 3
Cactus Racing	Mazda	Mazda RX-7 254	Mazda RE13B 1.3 L 2-rotor	30	(Japan) Hiroshi Sugai	D	1, 3
Cactus Racing	Mazda	Mazda RX-7 254	Mazda RE13B 1.3 L 2-rotor	30	(Japan) Yu Konishi	D	3
Auto Innan	Oscar	Oscar SK85	Mazda RE13B 1.3 L 2-rotor	30	(Japan) Seiji Imoto	Y	2, 5
Auto Innan	Oscar	Oscar SK85	Mazda RE13B 1.3 L 2-rotor	30	(Japan) Tadao Yamauchi	Y	2, 5
Auto Innan	Oscar	Oscar SK85	Mazda RE13B 1.3 L 2-rotor	30	(Japan) Masauki Sunada	Y	5
Horii Racing Sport	Oscar	Oscar SK85	Mazda RE13B 1.3 L 2-rotor	31	(Japan) Nobuyoshi Horii	Y	2
Horii Racing Sport	Oscar	Oscar SK85	Mazda RE13B 1.3 L 2-rotor	31	(Japan) Tadao Shinya	Y	2
Horii Racing Sport	Oscar	Oscar SK85	Mazda RE13B 1.3 L 2-rotor	31	(Japan) Hajime Kajiwara	Y	2
Limit/ADVAN	Oscar	Oscar SK85	Mazda RE13B 1.3 L 2-rotor	66	(Japan) Zenkichi Maruko	Y	5
Limit/ADVAN	Oscar	Oscar SK85	Mazda RE13B 1.3 L 2-rotor	66	(Japan) Kazuki Yamaguchi	Y	5
Valvoline	Oscar	Oscar SK85	Mazda RE13B 1.3 L 2-rotor	67	(Japan) Tsuguaki Ogura	D	5
Valvoline	Oscar	Oscar SK85	Mazda RE13B 1.3 L 2-rotor	67	(Japan) Yoshiyuki Ogura	D	5
Valvoline	Oscar	Oscar SK85	Mazda RE13B 1.3 L 2-rotor	67	(Japan) Hiromi Nishizawa	D	5
Expert Endo Shokai	Nissan	Nissan Sunny	Nissan A12 1.3 L I4	71	(Japan) Yoshiaki Jitsukawa	D	1, 3–4
Expert Endo Shokai	Nissan	Nissan Sunny	Nissan A12 1.3 L I4	71	(Japan) Shinya Nishizawa	D	1, 3–4
Expert Endo Shokai	Nissan	Nissan Sunny	Nissan A12 1.3 L I4	71	(Japan) Masao Endo	D	1
Expert Endo Shokai	Nissan	Nissan Sunny	Nissan A12 1.3 L I4	71	(Japan) Michie Shinbori	D	3
Kazuo Ukita	Oscar	Oscar SK85	Mazda RE13B 1.3 L 2-rotor	77	(Japan) Kazuo Ukita	D	2
Kazuo Ukita	Oscar	Oscar SK85	Mazda RE13B 1.3 L 2-rotor	77	(Japan) Norihiro Takeda	D	2
Kazuo Ukita	Oscar	Oscar SK85	Mazda RE13B 1.3 L 2-rotor	77	(Japan) Hiroshi Yonetani	D	2
Yoshifumi Yamazaki	West	West 87S	Mazda RE13B 1.3 L 2-rotor	87	(Japan) Yoshifumi Yamazaki	D	2, 5
Yoshifumi Yamazaki	West	West 87S	Mazda RE13B 1.3 L 2-rotor	87	(Japan) Masaki Ohashi	D	2, 5
Yoshifumi Yamazaki	West	West 87S	Mazda RE13B 1.3 L 2-rotor	87	(Japan) Naoto Chikada	D	5
Totomi Byoin	West	West 87S	Mazda RE13B 1.3 L 2-rotor	88	(Japan) Hajime Oshiro	D	5
Totomi Byoin	West	West 87S	Mazda RE13B 1.3 L 2-rotor	88	(Japan) Soichiro Tanaka	D	5

== Season results ==
Season results as follows:

Round	Circuit	Winning team
Round	Circuit	Winning drivers
1	Mt. Fuji	#27 FromA Racing Porsche 962C
1	Mt. Fuji	(Japan) Hideki Okada (Sweden) Stanley Dickens
2	Suzuka Circuit; Report	#25 Rothmans Team Schuppan Porsche 962C
2	Suzuka Circuit; Report	(Brazil) Maurizio Sandro Sala (Sweden) Eje Elgh
3	Mt. Fuji; Report	#16 Leyton House Racing Porsche 962C
3	Mt. Fuji; Report	(Italy) Bruno Giacomelli (Denmark) Kris Nissen
4	Mt. Fuji	#27 FromA Racing Porsche 962C
4	Mt. Fuji	(Japan) Hideki Okada (Sweden) Stanley Dickens
5	Suzuka Circuit; Report	#27 FromA Racing Porsche 962C
5	Suzuka Circuit; Report	(Japan) Hideki Okada (Sweden) Stanley Dickens
6	Mt. Fuji; Report	#1 Tom Walkinshaw Racing Jaguar XJR-9
6	Mt. Fuji; Report	(United Kingdom) Martin Brundle (Denmark) John Nielsen (United States) Eddie Cheever

== Point Ranking ==
=== Drivers ===
Rank	Drivers	Number/Team	Points	Wins	Distance
1	(Japan) Hideki Okada	#27 FromA Racing Porsche 962C	80	3	2314.39 km
2	(Sweden) Stanley Dickens	#27 FromA Racing Porsche 962C	80	3	1641.05 km
3	(United States) Price Cobb	#55 Omron Racing Porsche 962C	50	0	
4	(Japan) Kunimitsu Takahashi	#1 Alpha Nova Porsche 962C	48	0	2098.01 km
5	(Japan) Kazuo Mogi	#1 Alpha Nova Porsche 962C	48	0	1355.2 km
6	(Denmark) Kris Nissen	#16 Leyton House Racing Porsche 962C	47	1	

=== Makes ===
Rank	Make	Points	Wins
1	Porsche	115	5
2	March-Nissan	36	0
3	Toyota	28	0
4	Mazda	20	0
5	Jaguar	20	1
6	SARD-Toyota	8	0
7	Sauber-Mercedes	8	0
