= 1988 Suzuka 500 km =

Layout of the Suzuka International Racing Course (1987-2002)

The Suzuka 500 km, was the second round of the 1988 All Japan Sports Prototype Championship was held at the Suzuka Circuit, on 10 April, in front of a crowd of approximately 24,000.

== Report ==
=== Entry ===
A total of 26 cars were entered for the event, across three classes ranging from Local Prototypes to Group C Prototypes.

=== Qualifying ===
The pairing of Vern Schuppan and George Fouché took pole position for Trust Racing Team, in their Porsche 962GTi ahead of the European partnership of Kenny Acheson and Emanuele Pirro for the Omron Racing Team, in their Porsche 962C, by over 1.06secs.

=== Race ===
The race was held over 86 laps of the Suzuka circuit, a distance of 500 km (actual distance was 503.911 km). Eje Elgh and Maurizio Sandro Sala took the winner spoils for the Rothmans Porsche Schuppan Team, driving their Porsche 962C. The pair won in a time of 2hr 59:12.876mins., averaging a speed of 93.726 mph. Second place went to Vern Schuppan and George Fouché in the Trust Racing Team’s Porsche 962GTi who finished about 20seconds adrift. Also, the lead lap, was the third placed Porsche 962CK6 of Kris Nissen and Harald Grohs.

== Classification ==
=== 500km Suzuka ===
Class Winners are in Bold text.

Pos.	No.	Class	Drivers			Entrant	Car — Engine	Time, Laps	Reason Out
1st	**25**	**C**	**(Sweden) Eje Elgh**	**(Brazil) Maurizio Sandro Sala**		**Rothmans Porsche Schuppan Team**	**Porsche 962C**	2:59:12.876	
2nd	100	C	(Australia) Vern Schuppan	(South Africa) George Fouché		Trust Racing Team	Porsche 962GTi	2:59:32.386	
3rd	16	C	(Denmark) Kris Nissen	(Germany) Harald Grohs		Leyton House Racing Team	Porsche 962CK6	3:00:31.704	
4th	27	C	(Japan) Hideki Okada	(Sweden) Stanley Dickens		From A Racing	Porsche 962C	3:01:30.755	
5th	37	C	(Sweden) Stefan Johansson	(Italy) Paolo Barilla		Toyota Team Tom’s	Toyota 88C	85	
6th	23	C	(Japan) Kazuyoshi Hoshino	(Japan) Kenji Takahashi		Nissan Motorsport	Nissan R88C	84	
7th	201	C	(Japan) Yoshimi Katayama	(Japan) Yojiro Tarada	(Japan) Takashi Yorino	Mazdaspeed	Mazda 767	81	
8th	**151**	**B**	**(Japan) Jirou Yoneyama**	**(Japan) Hideo Fukuyama**		**British Barn Racing Team**	**JTK-Ford 63C**	79	
9th	32	C	(Japan) Masahiro Hasemi	(Japan) Aguri Suzuki		Nissan Motorsport	Nissan R88C	77	
10th	50	C	(Japan) Syuuroku Saski	(Japan) Tsunehisa Asai		SARD	SARD-Toyota MC88S	76	
11th	**87**	**A**	**(Japan) Yoshifumi Yamazaki**	**(Japan) Masaki Oohashi**		**Yoshifumi Yamazaki**	**West-Mazda 87S**	74	
12th	48	A	(Japan) Keiichi Mizutani	(Japan) Norizaku Tomiyasu		Gorou Suzuki	Oscar-Mazda SK85	74	
13th	77	A	(Japan) Kazuo Ukita	(Japan) Norihiro Takeda	(Japan) Hiroshi Yonetani	Kazuo Ukita	Oscar-Mazda SK85	74	
14th	230	C	(Japan) Syuuji Fujii	(Japan) Terumitsu Fujieda		Shizumatsu Racing	Mazda 757	71	
15th	9	A	(Japan) Keiichi Kosaka	(Japan) Masayoshi Furuya	(Japan) Souichirou Tanaka	Keiichi Kosaka	West-Mazda 85S	70	
16th	14	A	(Japan) Junji Okada	(Japan) Mitsui Yamamoto		RS Yamada	West-Mazda 83S II	70	
17th	30	A	(Japan) Seiji Imoto	(Japan) Seiji Imoto	(Japan) Tadao Yamauchi	Auto In'nan	Oscar-Mazda 8II	68	
DNF	36	C	(Japan) Kiyotaka Nonomura	(Japan) Masanori Sekiya		Toyota team TOM’S	Toyota 88C	82	DNF
DNF	101	B	(Japan) Masami Shirai	(Japan) Syunji Abe		Unicorn Racing	MCS Guppy-Mazda	73	
DNF	15	C	(Japan) Naoki Nagasaka	(Japan) Kaoru Hoshino	(Japan) Masahiro Kageyama	Leyton House Racing Team	Porsche 962C	69	Suspension
DNF	1	C	(Japan) Kunimitsu Takahashi	(Japan) Kazuo Mogi		Advan Alpha Nova	Porsche 962C	58	Engine
DNF	6	A	(Japan) Seiichi Sodeyama	(Japan) Yoshiyuki Ogura		West Racing Cars	West-Mazda 87S	55	Engine
DNF	55	C	(Northern Ireland) Kenny Acheson	(Italy) Emanuele Pirro		Omron Racing Team	Porsche 962C	38	Engine
DNF	85	C	(Japan) Takao Wada	(Sweden) Anders Olofsson		Person’s Racing Team	March-Nissan 88S	31	Transmission
DNF	31	A	(Japan) Nobuyoshi Horii	(Japan) Tadao Shin’ya	(Japan) Hajime Kajiwara	Norii Racing Sport	Oscar-Mazda SK85	13	Drive Shaft
DNF	3	C	(Sweden) Steven Andskär	(England) Andrew Gilbert-Scott		Auto Beaurex Motorsport	TOM’s-Toyota 86C	4	CV joint

- Fastest lap: Hideki Okada/Stanley Dickens, 1:56.691secs. (112.98 mph)
