= 1988 1000 km of Fuji =

Motor racing meeting

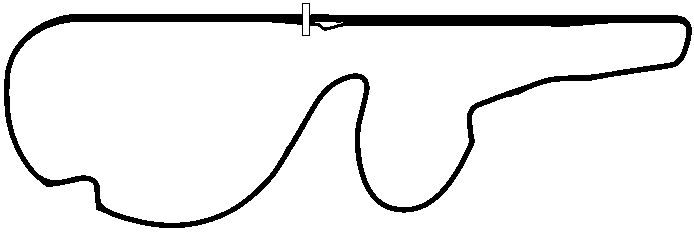
Layout of the Fuji Speedway (1987–2003)

The 1988 1000 km Fuji was the tenth round of the 1988 World Sports-Prototype Championship as well as the sixth and final round of the 1988 All Japan Sports Prototype Car Endurance Championship. It took place at the Fuji Speedway, Japan on September 18, 1988.

== Official results ==
Class winners in bold. Cars failing to complete 75% of the winner's distance marked as Not Classified (NC).

Pos	Class	No	Team	Drivers	Chassis	Tyre	Laps
Pos	Class	No	Team	Drivers	Engine	Tyre	Laps
1	**C1**	**1**	**(United Kingdom) Silk Cut Jaguar**	**(United Kingdom) Martin Brundle (United States) Eddie Cheever**	**Jaguar XJR-9**	**D**	**224**
1	**C1**	**1**	**(United Kingdom) Silk Cut Jaguar**	**(United Kingdom) Martin Brundle (United States) Eddie Cheever**	**Jaguar 7.0L V12**	**D**	**224**
2	C1	17	(Germany) Omron Porsche AG	(Germany) Klaus Ludwig (United States) Price Cobb	Porsche 962C	**D**	223
2	C1	17	(Germany) Omron Porsche AG	(Germany) Klaus Ludwig (United States) Price Cobb	Porsche Type-935 3.0L Turbo Flat-6	**D**	223
3	C1	8	(Germany) Joest Racing	(Germany) Frank Jelinski (Germany) "John Winter"	Porsche 962C	**G**	221
3	C1	8	(Germany) Joest Racing	(Germany) Frank Jelinski (Germany) "John Winter"	Porsche Type-935 3.0L Turbo Flat-6	**G**	221
4	C1	27	(Japan) From-A Racing	(Japan) Hideki Okada (Sweden) Stanley Dickens	Porsche 962C	**B**	221
4	C1	27	(Japan) From-A Racing	(Japan) Hideki Okada (Sweden) Stanley Dickens	Porsche Type-935 3.2L Turbo Flat-6	**B**	221
5	C1	61	(Switzerland) Team Sauber Mercedes	(France) Jean-Louis Schlesser (Germany) Jochen Mass (United Kingdom) Kenny Acheson	Sauber C9	**MI**	220
5	C1	61	(Switzerland) Team Sauber Mercedes	(France) Jean-Louis Schlesser (Germany) Jochen Mass (United Kingdom) Kenny Acheson	Mercedes-Benz M117 5.0L Turbo V8	**MI**	220
6	C1	25	(Japan) Advan Alpha Nova	(Japan) Kunimitsu Takahashi (Japan) Kazou Mogi	Porsche 962C	**Y**	217
6	C1	25	(Japan) Advan Alpha Nova	(Japan) Kunimitsu Takahashi (Japan) Kazou Mogi	Porsche Type-935 3.0L Turbo Flat-6	**Y**	217
7	C1	99	(Australia) Rothmans Porsche Team Schuppan	(Brazil) Maurizio Sandro Sala (Sweden) Eje Elgh	Porsche 962C	**D**	214
7	C1	99	(Australia) Rothmans Porsche Team Schuppan	(Brazil) Maurizio Sandro Sala (Sweden) Eje Elgh	Porsche Type-935 3.0L Turbo Flat-6	**D**	214
8	C1	28	(Japan) Leyton House Racing Team	(Japan) Naoki Nagasaka (Japan) Kaoru Hoshino (Japan) Masahiko Kageyama	Porsche 962C	**B**	214
8	C1	28	(Japan) Leyton House Racing Team	(Japan) Naoki Nagasaka (Japan) Kaoru Hoshino (Japan) Masahiko Kageyama	Porsche Type-935 3.0L Turbo Flat-6	**B**	214
9	C1	23	(Japan) Nissan Motorsports	(Japan) Kazuyoshi Hoshino (Japan) Kenji Takahashi (Australia) Allan Grice	Nissan R88C	**B**	214
9	C1	23	(Japan) Nissan Motorsports	(Japan) Kazuyoshi Hoshino (Japan) Kenji Takahashi (Australia) Allan Grice	Nissan VEJ30 3.0L Turbo V8	**B**	214
10	C1	100	(Japan) Trust Racing Team	(South Africa) Sarel van der Merwe (South Africa) George Fouché (Australia) Vern Schuppan	Porsche 962C GTi	**D**	214
10	C1	100	(Japan) Trust Racing Team	(South Africa) Sarel van der Merwe (South Africa) George Fouché (Australia) Vern Schuppan	Porsche Type-935 3.0L Turbo Flat-6	**D**	214
11	**C2**	**103**	**(United Kingdom) BP Spice Engineering**	**(Chile) Eliseo Salazar (Denmark) Thorkild Thyrring**	**Spice SE88C**	**G**	**212**
11	**C2**	**103**	**(United Kingdom) BP Spice Engineering**	**(Chile) Eliseo Salazar (Denmark) Thorkild Thyrring**	**Ford Cosworth DFL 3.3L V8**	**G**	**212**
12	C1	32	(Japan) Nissan Motorsports	(Japan) Masahiro Hasemi (Japan) Aguri Suzuki	Nissan R88C	**B**	210
12	C1	32	(Japan) Nissan Motorsports	(Japan) Masahiro Hasemi (Japan) Aguri Suzuki	Nissan VEJ30 3.0L Turbo V8	**B**	210
13	C2	121	(United Kingdom) Cosmik GP Motorsport	(United States) Tom Hessert (Greece) Costas Los	Spice SE87C	**G**	209
13	C2	121	(United Kingdom) Cosmik GP Motorsport	(United States) Tom Hessert (Greece) Costas Los	Ford Cosworth DFL 3.3L V8	**G**	209
14	**GTP**	**202**	**(Japan) Mazdaspeed**	**(Japan) Yojiro Terada (Republic of Ireland) David Kennedy**	**Mazda 767**	**D**	**209**
14	**GTP**	**202**	**(Japan) Mazdaspeed**	**(Japan) Yojiro Terada (Republic of Ireland) David Kennedy**	**Mazda 13J 2.6L 4-Rotor**	**D**	**209**
15	C2	106	(Italy) Kelmar Racing	(Italy) Ranieri Randaccio (Italy) Vito Veninata	Tiga GC288	**A**	207
15	C2	106	(Italy) Kelmar Racing	(Italy) Ranieri Randaccio (Italy) Vito Veninata	Ford Cosworth DFL 3.3L V8	**A**	207
16	C1	11	(Japan) Leyton House Racing Team (Germany) Porsche Kremer Racing	(Argentina) Oscar Larrauri (Italy) Bruno Giacomelli	Porsche 962CK6	**B**	206
16	C1	11	(Japan) Leyton House Racing Team (Germany) Porsche Kremer Racing	(Argentina) Oscar Larrauri (Italy) Bruno Giacomelli	Porsche Type-935 3.0L Turbo Flat-6	**B**	206
17	C1	33	(Australia) Takefuji Racing Team Schuppan	(United Kingdom) Brian Redman (United Kingdom) Derek Bell	Porsche 962C	**D**	192
17	C1	33	(Australia) Takefuji Racing Team Schuppan	(United Kingdom) Brian Redman (United Kingdom) Derek Bell	Porsche Type-935 3.0L Turbo Flat-6	**D**	192
18	C2	171	(Japan) British Barn Racing Team	(Japan) Hideo Fukuyama (Japan) Jirou Yoneyama (Japan) Kiyoshi Misaki	British Barn JTK 63C	?	189
18	C2	171	(Japan) British Barn Racing Team	(Japan) Hideo Fukuyama (Japan) Jirou Yoneyama (Japan) Kiyoshi Misaki	Ford Cosworth DFL 3.3L V8	?	189
19	C2	127	(United Kingdom) Chamberlain Engineering	(United Kingdom) Ian Khan (Australia) Arthur Abrahams (Australia) Dan Murphy	Spice SE86C	**A**	187
19	C2	127	(United Kingdom) Chamberlain Engineering	(United Kingdom) Ian Khan (Australia) Arthur Abrahams (Australia) Dan Murphy	Hart 418T 1.8L Turbo I4	**A**	187
20	GTP	230	(Japan) Shizumatsu Racing	(Japan) Tetsuji Shiratori (Japan) Syuuji Fujii (Japan) Terumitsu Fujieda	Mazda 757	?	181
20	GTP	230	(Japan) Shizumatsu Racing	(Japan) Tetsuji Shiratori (Japan) Syuuji Fujii (Japan) Terumitsu Fujieda	Mazda 13G 2.0L 3-Rotor	?	181
21	C1	37	(Japan) Toyota Team Tom's	(Japan) Hitoshi Ogawa (Sweden) Stefan Johansson (Italy) Paolo Barilla	Toyota 88C-V	**B**	161
21	C1	37	(Japan) Toyota Team Tom's	(Japan) Hitoshi Ogawa (Sweden) Stefan Johansson (Italy) Paolo Barilla	Toyota R32V 3.2L Turbo V8	**B**	161
22	C1	36	(Japan) Toyota Team Tom's	(Japan) Masanori Sekiya (Japan) Keiichi Suzuki (United Kingdom) Geoff Lees	Toyota 88C-V	**B**	159
22	C1	36	(Japan) Toyota Team Tom's	(Japan) Masanori Sekiya (Japan) Keiichi Suzuki (United Kingdom) Geoff Lees	Toyota R32V 3.2L Turbo V8	**B**	159
23 DNF	C2	107	(United Kingdom) Chamberlain Engineering	(France) Claude Ballot-Léna (France) Jean-Louis Ricci (United Kingdom) Ian Khan	Spice SE88C	**A**	197
23 DNF	C2	107	(United Kingdom) Chamberlain Engineering	(France) Claude Ballot-Léna (France) Jean-Louis Ricci (United Kingdom) Ian Khan	Ford Cosworth DFL 3.3L V8	**A**	197
24 DNF	C1	7	(Germany) Joest Racing	(Germany) Harald Grohs (France) Bob Wollek	Porsche 962C	**G**	191
24 DNF	C1	7	(Germany) Joest Racing	(Germany) Harald Grohs (France) Bob Wollek	Porsche Type-935 3.0L Turbo Flat-6	**G**	191
25 DNF	C1	62	(Switzerland) Team Sauber Mercedes	(Italy) Mauro Baldi (France) Philippe Streiff	Sauber C9	**MI**	175
25 DNF	C1	62	(Switzerland) Team Sauber Mercedes	(Italy) Mauro Baldi (France) Philippe Streiff	Mercedes-Benz M117 5.0L Turbo V8	**MI**	175
26 DNF	C2	111	(United Kingdom) BP Spice Engineering	(United Kingdom) Ray Bellm (United Kingdom) Gordon Spice	Spice SE88C	**G**	175
26 DNF	C2	111	(United Kingdom) BP Spice Engineering	(United Kingdom) Ray Bellm (United Kingdom) Gordon Spice	Ford Cosworth DFL 3.3L V8	**G**	175
27 DNF	C1	10	(Germany) Porsche Kremer Racing	(Germany) Volker Weidler (Germany) Manuel Reuter	Porsche 962CK6	**Y**	171
27 DNF	C1	10	(Germany) Porsche Kremer Racing	(Germany) Volker Weidler (Germany) Manuel Reuter	Porsche Type-935 3.0L Turbo Flat-6	**Y**	171
28 DNF	C1	20	(United Kingdom) Team Davey	(United Kingdom) Tim Lee-Davey (United Kingdom) Tom Dodd-Noble (Japan) Katsunori Iketani	Porsche 962C	**D**	112
28 DNF	C1	20	(United Kingdom) Team Davey	(United Kingdom) Tim Lee-Davey (United Kingdom) Tom Dodd-Noble (Japan) Katsunori Iketani	Porsche Type-935 3.0L Turbo Flat-6	**D**	112
29 DNF	C1	50	(Japan) SARD	(Japan) Syuuroku Sasaki (United Kingdom) Martin Donnelly (Germany) Jochen Dauer	SARD MC88S	**D**	109
29 DNF	C1	50	(Japan) SARD	(Japan) Syuuroku Sasaki (United Kingdom) Martin Donnelly (Germany) Jochen Dauer	Toyota 3S-GTM 2.1L Turbo I4	**D**	109
30 DNF	GTP	201	(Japan) Mazdaspeed	(Japan) Takashi Yorino (Japan) Yoshimi Katayama (Belgium) Pierre Dieudonné	Mazda 767	**D**	96
30 DNF	GTP	201	(Japan) Mazdaspeed	(Japan) Takashi Yorino (Japan) Yoshimi Katayama (Belgium) Pierre Dieudonné	Mazda 13J 2.6L 4-Rotor	**D**	96
31 DNF	C1	2	(United Kingdom) Silk Cut Jaguar	(Netherlands) Jan Lammers (United Kingdom) Johnny Dumfries	Jaguar XJR-9	**D**	35
31 DNF	C1	2	(United Kingdom) Silk Cut Jaguar	(Netherlands) Jan Lammers (United Kingdom) Johnny Dumfries	Jaguar 7.0L V12	**D**	35
32 DNF	C1	86	(Japan) Italiya Racing Team (Japan) Team LeMans	(Japan) Takao Wada (Sweden) Anders Olofsson	March 88S	**Y**	25
32 DNF	C1	86	(Japan) Italiya Racing Team (Japan) Team LeMans	(Japan) Takao Wada (Sweden) Anders Olofsson	Nissan VG30 3.2L Turbo V6	**Y**	25
33 DNF	C1	77	(Switzerland) Memorex Telex Racing Team (Switzerland) Brun Motorsport	(United Kingdom) Tiff Needell (Italy) Gianpiero Moretti (Norway) Harald Huysman	Porsche 962C	?	14
33 DNF	C1	77	(Switzerland) Memorex Telex Racing Team (Switzerland) Brun Motorsport	(United Kingdom) Tiff Needell (Italy) Gianpiero Moretti (Norway) Harald Huysman	Porsche Type-935 3.0L Turbo Flat-6	?	14
34 DNF	C1	85	(Japan) Person's Racing Team (Japan) Team LeMans	(Japan) Toshio Suzuki (Japan) Akio Morimoto	March 88S	**Y**	11
34 DNF	C1	85	(Japan) Person's Racing Team (Japan) Team LeMans	(Japan) Toshio Suzuki (Japan) Akio Morimoto	Nissan VG30 3.2L Turbo V6	**Y**	11
35 DNF	C1	45	(Japan) Auto Beaurex Motorsport	(United Kingdom) Andrew Gilbert-Scott (Sweden) Steven Andskär	Toyota 87C	**D**	6
35 DNF	C1	45	(Japan) Auto Beaurex Motorsport	(United Kingdom) Andrew Gilbert-Scott (Sweden) Steven Andskär	Toyota 3S-GTM 2.1L Turbo I4	**D**	6

== Statistics ==
- Pole Position - #27 From-A Racing - 1:18.210
- Fastest Lap - #17 Omron Porsche AG - 1:21.795
- Average Speed - 183.106 km/h

World Sportscar Championship
Previous race: 1988 1000km of Spa	1988 season	Next race: 1988 360km of Sandown Park

All Japan Sports Prototype Championship
Previous race: 1988 1000km of Suzuka	1988 season	Next race: None
