= Toyota 88C =

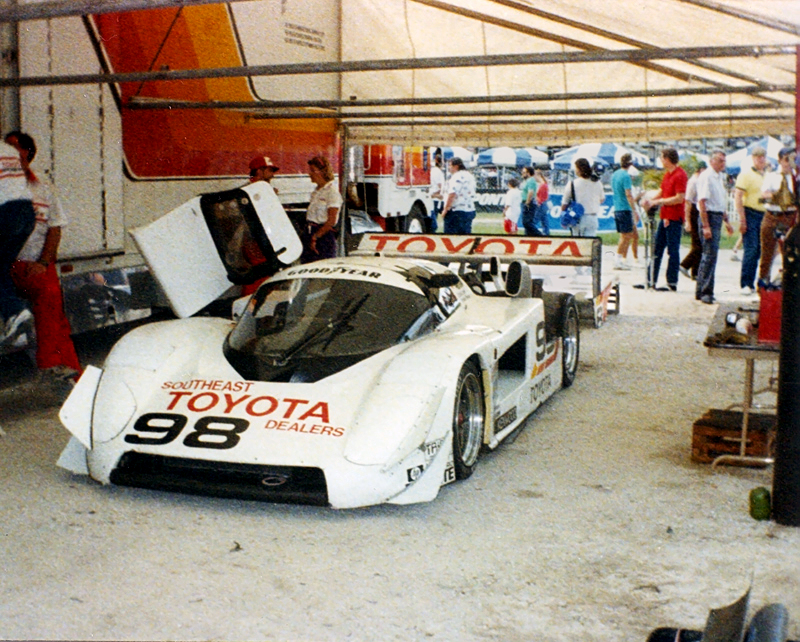
- Category: Group C Sports prototype
- Constructor: Dome
- Designer(s): Hiro Fujimori

Technical specifications
- Chassis: Aluminium monocoque
- Suspension (front): Double wishbone suspension, coil-spring over damper
- Suspension (rear): Double wishbone suspension, coil-spring over damper
- Engine: Toyota 3S-GTM 2100 cc Turbocharged Inline-4 Mid-mounted
- Transmission: manual transmission
- Tyres: Bridgestone

Competition history
- Notable entrants: Toyota Team Tom's; All American Racers
- Notable drivers: (Japan) Hitoshi Ogawa (Italy) Paolo Barilla (United Kingdom) Geoff Lees (Japan) Masanori Sekiya (Argentina) Juan Manuel Fangio II
- Debut: 1988 500km of Fuji
- Last season: 1989
Races	Wins	Poles
24	0	2
- Constructors' Championships: 0
- Drivers' Championships: 0

The Toyota 88C was a racing car entered by Toyota from 1988 to 1989. It is the successor to the Toyota 87C and the predecessor to the Toyota 88C-V. Like other Toyota-powered sports prototypes of the era, it was designed and built by Dome. The 88C is an evolution of the 87C, both models sharing the same chassis number designation. The 88Cs competed in the All Japan Sports Prototype Championship, the World Sports-Prototype Championship, and the North American Camel GT Championship.

== Racing history ==
=== All Japan Sports Prototype Championship ===
The 88C made its debut in the 1988 All Japan Sports Prototype Championship, with a two-cars program fielded by Toyota Team Tom's achieving two fifth places as best results (Suzuka 500 km and Suzuka 1000 km).

=== Le Mans ===
Two 88Cs were entered by Toyota Team Tom's at the 1988 24 Hours of Le Mans. Both cars completed the event with the car of drivers Geoff Lees, Masanori Sekiya, and Kaoru Hoshino finishing in 12th, while the second car was 24th. Toyota returned to Le Mans in 1989 with one 88C joining two newer 89C-Vs. None of the three cars finished the race.

=== World Sports-Prototype Championship ===
Apart from the 1988 24 Hours of Le Mans and the 1988 1000 km of Fuji (also valid as final round of the 1988 JSPC), the 88C made a final WSPC appearance early in the 1989 season when Toyota Team Tom's entered a lone car at Dijon-Prenois while awaiting their newer 89C-Vs. The 88C finished in fourth in the hands of Geoff Lees and Johnny Dumfries.

=== Camel GT Championship ===
In 1989 Toyota and All American Racers entered the GTP category of IMSA's Camel GT Championship. One car was designed by AAR and entered as the Eagle HF89, while the second entry was a modified 88C. Both were powered by same turbocharged inline-4 engine and produced approximately 600 horsepower.

The 88C-based car made its debut at the 1989 Daytona 24 Hours race but retired from the event. Due to troubles with the HF89 car, the team concentrated its efforts on the 88C throughout the rest of the season. After the completion of the season AAR concentrated their efforts on the HF89 and the latter Mk.III.

The best result was a second place at San Antonio and two pole positions at Road Atlanta and Lime Rock.
