= Toyota 88C-V =

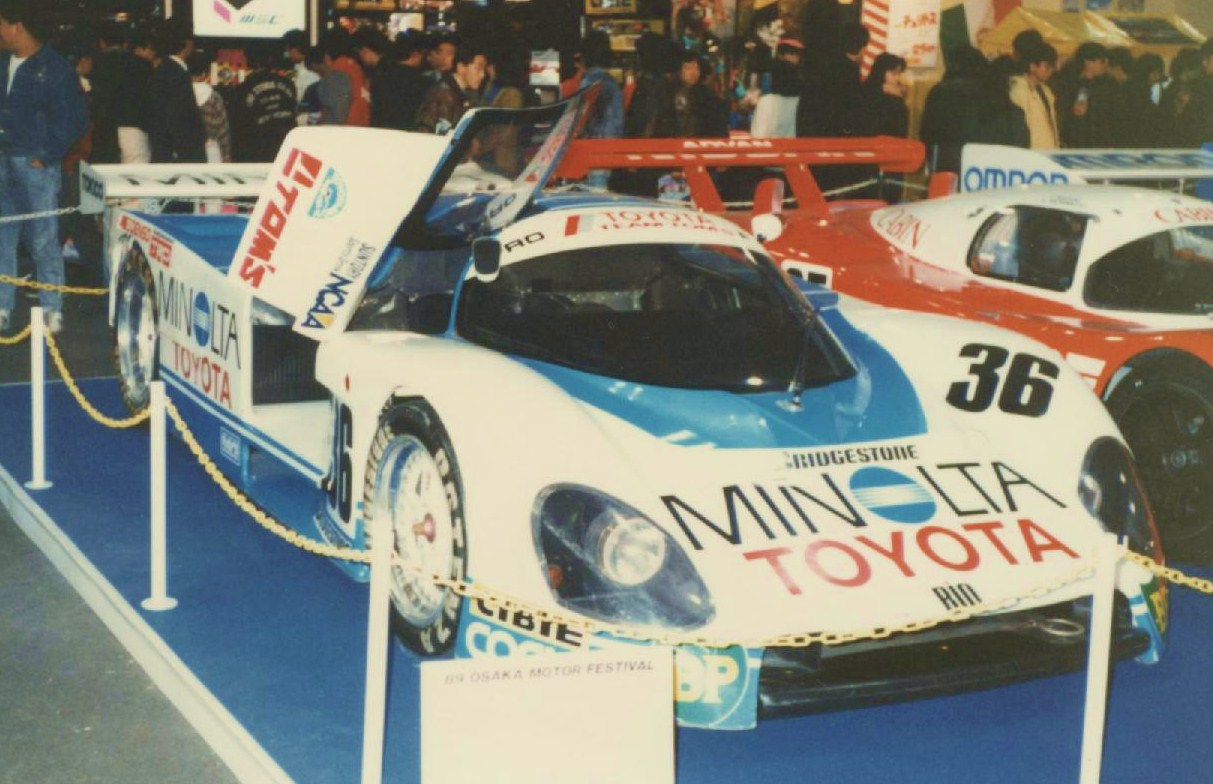
- Category: Group C Sports prototype
- Constructor: Dome
- Designers: Akiei Oku, Hiro Fujimori

Technical specifications
- Chassis: Aluminium monocoque
- Suspension (front): Double wishbone suspension, coil-spring over damper
- Suspension (rear): Double wishbone suspension, coil-spring over damper
- Engine: Toyota R32V 3,169 cc (193.4 cu in) V8 Turbocharged, mid-mounted
- Transmission: Toyota/March 88T, 5-speed manual dogleg
- Fuel: 100 Litres
- Tyres: Bridgestone

Competition history
- Notable entrants: Toyota Team Tom's
- Notable drivers: (Japan) Hitoshi Ogawa; (Italy) Paolo Barilla; (United Kingdom) Geoff Lees; (Japan) Keiichi Suzuki; (Sweden) Stefan Johansson; (Japan) Masanori Sekiya
- Debut: 1988 500 miles of Fuji
- Last season: 1988
| Races | Wins | Poles |
|---|---|---|
| 3 | 0 | 0 |
- Constructors' Championships: 0
- Drivers' Championships: 0

The Toyota 88C-V was a Group C sports prototype entered by Toyota in 1988. The race car has a top speed of 375 km/h (233 mph), accelerates from 0–100 km/h (0–62 mph) in 3.8 seconds, produces 809 CV (595 kW; 798 hp) at 8000 rpm and weighs 850 kg (1,870 lb). It is the successor to the Toyota 88C and the predecessor to the Toyota 89C-V. Like other Toyota-powered sports prototypes of the era, it was designed and built by Dome. The car was a new design, developed around the Toyota's R32V 3.2 L (200 cu in) turbocharged V8 engine, which replaced the 88C's standard turbocharged Inline-4. The 88C-V competed in the All Japan Sports Prototype Championship.

== Racing history ==
=== All Japan Sports Prototype Championship ===
The 88C-V made its debut at the 1988 Fuji 500 miles with a single car entered for Geoff Lees, Masanori Sekiya and Keiichi Suzuki but wasn't able to finish the race due to mechanical problems.

=== World Sports-Prototype Championship ===
Two 88C-Vs participated in the Japanese round of the World Sports-Prototype Championship, counting also as last round of the 1988 JSPC. The 1000 km of Fuji allowed Toyota another chance to compete against European competitors since Le Mans. The two cars were able to finish but were the last cars classified.
