= Mazda 767 =

Prototype racing car

Mazda 767 Mazda 767B
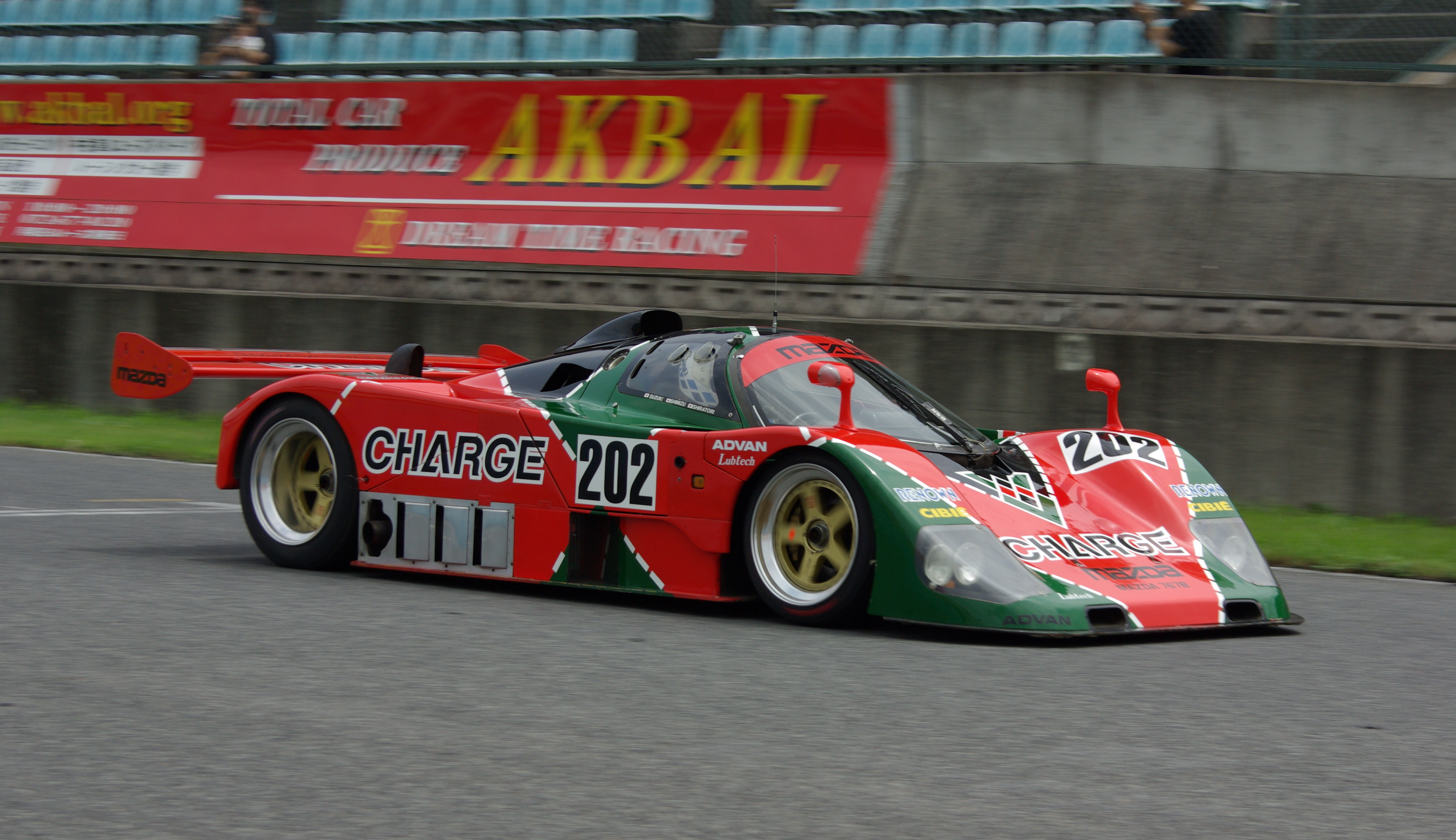
- A 767B at Central Circuit in 2007
- Category: Group C/IMSA GTP
- Designer: Nigel Stroud
- Production: 1988-1989
- Predecessor: Mazda 757
- Successor: Mazda 787

Technical specifications
- Chassis: Carbon-fiber, Kevlar, and aluminum honeycomb monocoque
- Suspension: Double wishbones with inboard coil springs over shock absorbers
- Engine: 767: Mazda 13J-M 2,616 cc (159.6 cu in) 4-rotor naturally aspirated, mid-engined, longitudinally mounted 767B: Mazda 13J-MM 2,616 cc (159.6 cu in) 4-rotor naturally aspirated, mid-engined, longitudinally mounted
- Transmission: Mazda/Porsche 5-speed manual
- Power: 767: 500 hp (373 kW) @ 8,500 rpm 767B: 630 hp (470 kW) @ 9,000 rpm
- Weight: 800 kg (1,764 lb)
- Brakes: Rays Volk discs

Competition history
- Notable entrants: (Japan) Mazdaspeed
- Debut: 1988 Suzuka 500 km (767); 1989 24 Hours of Daytona (767B)
- Last event: 1992 Fuji 1000km
Races	Wins	Poles	F/Laps
38	0	0	0
- Constructors' Championships: 0
- Drivers' Championships: 0

The Mazda 767 and 767B are prototype racing cars that were built by Mazdaspeed for the 24 Hours of Le Mans running under the International Motor Sports Association-specification GTP class. The 767 replaced the 757 in 1988, upgrading to a newer and larger four-rotor 13J Wankel engine, which produced nearly 600 hp (450 kW).

Two 767s were entered at 1988 24 Hours of Le Mans, finishing 17th and 19th overall, but they finished behind a sole 757, which was able to finish 15th. In the All Japan Sports Prototype Championship (JSPC), Mazda managed fourth in the constructors' championship. For 1989, Mazda upgraded the 767 into the 767B, and initially tested it in the International Motor Sports Association 24 Hours of Daytona, where it was successful in finishing fifth overall. Later in the year, Mazda returned to Le Mans with two 767Bs and an older 767. The 767Bs were able to finish seventh and ninth overall, while the lone 767 was able to finish 12th. However, in JSPC, the results were not as promising, as Mazda finished a mere 5th in the championship. For 1990, a single 767B was entered alongside two newer 787s, and was the only car of the three to finish, although in 20th overall.
