= 1987 1000 km of Fuji =

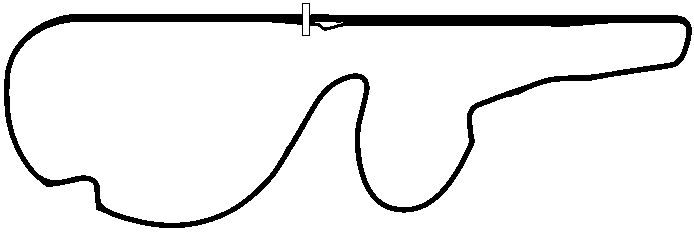
Layout of the Fuji Speedway (1987–2003)

The 1987 WEC in Japan (1000 km of Fuji) was the tenth and final round of the 1987 World Sports-Prototype Championship as well as the fifth round of the 1987 All Japan Sports Prototype Car Endurance Championship. It took place at Fuji Speedway, Japan on September 27, 1987.

== Official results ==
Class winners in bold. Cars failing to complete 75% of the winner's distance marked as Not Classified (NC).

| Pos | Class | No | Team | Drivers | Chassis | Tyre | Laps |
| Pos | Class | No | Team | Drivers | Engine | Tyre | Laps |
|---|---|---|---|---|---|---|---|
| 1 | **C1** | **5** | **(United Kingdom) Silk Cut Jaguar** | **(Netherlands) Jan Lammers (United Kingdom) John Watson** | **Jaguar XJR-8** | **D** | **224** |
| 1 | **C1** | **5** | **(United Kingdom) Silk Cut Jaguar** | **(Netherlands) Jan Lammers (United Kingdom) John Watson** | **Jaguar 7.0L V12** | **D** | **224** |
| 2 | C1 | 4 | (United Kingdom) Silk Cut Jaguar | (United Kingdom) Johnny Dumfries (Brazil) Raul Boesel | Jaguar XJR-8 | **D** | 224 |
| 2 | C1 | 4 | (United Kingdom) Silk Cut Jaguar | (United Kingdom) Johnny Dumfries (Brazil) Raul Boesel | Jaguar 7.0L V12 | **D** | 224 |
| 3 | C1 | 15 | (United Kingdom) Britten – Lloyd Racing | (Italy) Mauro Baldi (New Zealand) Mike Thackwell | Porsche 962C GTi | **G** | 221 |
| 3 | C1 | 15 | (United Kingdom) Britten – Lloyd Racing | (Italy) Mauro Baldi (New Zealand) Mike Thackwell | Porsche Type-935 2.8L Turbo Flat-6 | **G** | 221 |
| 4 | C1 | 1 | (Switzerland) Brun Motorsport | (Germany) Jochen Mass (Argentina) Oscar Larrauri | Porsche 962C | **MI** | 218 |
| 4 | C1 | 1 | (Switzerland) Brun Motorsport | (Germany) Jochen Mass (Argentina) Oscar Larrauri | Porsche Type-935 3.0L Turbo Flat-6 | **MI** | 218 |
| 5 | C1 | 8 | (Germany) Joest Racing | (Germany) Frank Jelinski (Germany) "John Winter" (France) Bob Wollek | Porsche 962C | **G** | 218 |
| 5 | C1 | 8 | (Germany) Joest Racing | (Germany) Frank Jelinski (Germany) "John Winter" (France) Bob Wollek | Porsche Type-935 2.8L Turbo Flat-6 | **G** | 218 |
| 6 | C1 | 99 | (Australia) Rothmans Porsche Team Schuppan | (Australia) Geoff Brabham (United Kingdom) Derek Bell | Porsche 962C | **D** | 218 |
| 6 | C1 | 99 | (Australia) Rothmans Porsche Team Schuppan | (Australia) Geoff Brabham (United Kingdom) Derek Bell | Porsche Type-935 3.0L Turbo Flat-6 | **D** | 218 |
| 7 | **GTP** | **202** | **(Japan) Mazdaspeed** | **(Japan) Takashi Yorino (Republic of Ireland) David Kennedy** | **Mazda 757** | **D** | **213** |
| 7 | **GTP** | **202** | **(Japan) Mazdaspeed** | **(Japan) Takashi Yorino (Republic of Ireland) David Kennedy** | **Mazda 13J 2.6L 4-Rotor** | **D** | **213** |
| 8 | **C2** | **111** | **(United Kingdom) Spice Engineering** | **(Spain) Fermín Vélez (United Kingdom) Gordon Spice** | **Spice SE87C** | **A** | **210** |
| 8 | **C2** | **111** | **(United Kingdom) Spice Engineering** | **(Spain) Fermín Vélez (United Kingdom) Gordon Spice** | **Ford Cosworth DFL 3.3L V8** | **A** | **210** |
| 9 | C1 | 27 | (Japan) From-A Racing | (Japan) Hideki Okada (Denmark) John Nielsen | Porsche 962C | ? | 209 |
| 9 | C1 | 27 | (Japan) From-A Racing | (Japan) Hideki Okada (Denmark) John Nielsen | Porsche Type-935 2.8L Turbo Flat-6 | ? | 209 |
| 10 | C1 | 100 | (Japan) Trust Racing Team | (Japan) Keiichi Suzuki (Australia) Vern Schuppan (United Kingdom) James Weaver | Porsche 962C | **D** | 209 |
| 10 | C1 | 100 | (Japan) Trust Racing Team | (Japan) Keiichi Suzuki (Australia) Vern Schuppan (United Kingdom) James Weaver | Porsche Type-935 2.8L Turbo Flat-6 | **D** | 209 |
| 11 | C1 | 25 | (Japan) Advan Alpha Racing | (Japan) Kunimitsu Takahashi (Japan) Kazuo Mogi (United Kingdom) Kenny Acheson | Porsche 962C | **Y** | 208 |
| 11 | C1 | 25 | (Japan) Advan Alpha Racing | (Japan) Kunimitsu Takahashi (Japan) Kazuo Mogi (United Kingdom) Kenny Acheson | Porsche 2.8L Turbo Flat-6 | **Y** | 208 |
| 12 | C1 | 10 | (Germany) Porsche Kremer Racing | (Austria) Franz Konrad (South Africa) George Fouché | Porsche 962C | **Y** | 207 |
| 12 | C1 | 10 | (Germany) Porsche Kremer Racing | (Austria) Franz Konrad (South Africa) George Fouché | Porsche Type-935 2.8L Turbo Flat-6 | **Y** | 207 |
| 13 | C1 | 28 | (Japan) Person's Racing Team | (Japan) Takao Wada (Sweden) Anders Olofsson | Nissan R86V | **Y** | 206 |
| 13 | C1 | 28 | (Japan) Person's Racing Team | (Japan) Takao Wada (Sweden) Anders Olofsson | Nissan VG30ET 3.0L Turbo V6 | **Y** | 206 |
| 14 | C2 | 102 | (United Kingdom) Ecurie Ecosse | (United Kingdom) Ray Mallock (United Kingdom) David Leslie | Ecosse C286 | **A** | 203 |
| 14 | C2 | 102 | (United Kingdom) Ecurie Ecosse | (United Kingdom) Ray Mallock (United Kingdom) David Leslie | Ford Cosworth DFL 3.3L V8 | **A** | 203 |
| 15 | C2 | 101 | (United Kingdom) Ecurie Ecosse | (United Kingdom) Marc Duez (United Kingdom) Mike Wilds | Ecosse C286 | **A** | 203 |
| 15 | C2 | 101 | (United Kingdom) Ecurie Ecosse | (United Kingdom) Marc Duez (United Kingdom) Mike Wilds | Ford Cosworth DFL 3.3L V8 | **A** | 203 |
| 16 | C1 | 23 | (Japan) NISMO | (Japan) Kenji Takahashi (Japan) Kazuyoshi Hoshino (United Kingdom) Dave Scott | Nissan R87E | **B** | 202 |
| 16 | C1 | 23 | (Japan) NISMO | (Japan) Kenji Takahashi (Japan) Kazuyoshi Hoshino (United Kingdom) Dave Scott | Nissan VEJ30 3.0L Turbo V6 | **B** | 202 |
| 17 | C1 | 50 | (Japan) SARD | (Japan) Tsunehisa Asai (Japan) Syuuroku Sasaki (United Kingdom) David Sears | SARD MC87S | ? | 197 |
| 17 | C1 | 50 | (Japan) SARD | (Japan) Tsunehisa Asai (Japan) Syuuroku Sasaki (United Kingdom) David Sears | Toyota 3S-GTM 2.1L Turbo I4 | ? | 197 |
| 18 | C2 | 127 | (United Kingdom) Chamberlain Engineering | (South Africa) Graham Duxbury (United Kingdom) Ian Khan | Spice SE86C | **A** | 194 |
| 18 | C2 | 127 | (United Kingdom) Chamberlain Engineering | (South Africa) Graham Duxbury (United Kingdom) Ian Khan | Hart 418T 1.8L Turbo I4 | **A** | 194 |
| 19 | C1 | 55 | (Japan) Alpha Cubic Racing Team | (Japan) Naoki Nagasaki (Japan) Chiyomi Totani (Japan) Hitoshi Ogawa | Porsche 962C | ? | 188 |
| 19 | C1 | 55 | (Japan) Alpha Cubic Racing Team | (Japan) Naoki Nagasaki (Japan) Chiyomi Totani (Japan) Hitoshi Ogawa | Porsche Type-935 2.8L Turbo Flat-6 | ? | 188 |
| 20 | C2 | 114 | Team Tiga Ford Denmark | (Denmark) Thorkild Thyrring (Denmark) Peter Elgaard | Tiga GC287 | **A** | 184 |
| 20 | C2 | 114 | Team Tiga Ford Denmark | (Denmark) Thorkild Thyrring (Denmark) Peter Elgaard | Ford Cosworth BDT-E 2.3L Turbo I4 | **A** | 184 |
| 21 | C1 | 77 | (Japan) Best House Racing Team | (Japan) Osamu Nakako (Brazil) Maurizio Sandro Sala | LM 07 | ? | 166 |
| 21 | C1 | 77 | (Japan) Best House Racing Team | (Japan) Osamu Nakako (Brazil) Maurizio Sandro Sala | Toyota 3S-GTM 2.1L Turbo I4 | ? | 166 |
| 22 | GTP | 285 | (Japan) Shizumatsu Racing | (Japan) Tetsuji Shiratori (Japan) Kaneyuki Okamoto | Mazda 737C | ? | 164 |
| 22 | GTP | 285 | (Japan) Shizumatsu Racing | (Japan) Tetsuji Shiratori (Japan) Kaneyuki Okamoto | Mazda 13B 1.3L 2-Rotor | ? | 164 |
| 23 NC | C1 | 11 | (Germany) Leyton House Racing Team (Germany) Porsche Kremer Racing | (Germany) Volker Weidler (Denmark) Kris Nissen | Porsche 962C | **Y** | 218 |
| 23 NC | C1 | 11 | (Germany) Leyton House Racing Team (Germany) Porsche Kremer Racing | (Germany) Volker Weidler (Denmark) Kris Nissen | Porsche Type-935 2.8L Turbo Flat-6 | **Y** | 218 |
| 24 DNF | C2 | 121 | (United Kingdom) Cosmic GP Motorsport | (Greece) Costas Los (United Kingdom) Chris Hodgetts | Tiga GC287 | **G** | 131 |
| 24 DNF | C2 | 121 | (United Kingdom) Cosmic GP Motorsport | (Greece) Costas Los (United Kingdom) Chris Hodgetts | Ford Cosworth DFL 3.3L V8 | **G** | 131 |
| 25 DNF | C2 | 118 | (United Kingdom) Chamberlain Engineering | (United States) Olindo Iacobelli (France) Jean-Louis Ricci | Spice SE86C | **A** | 120 |
| 25 DNF | C2 | 118 | (United Kingdom) Chamberlain Engineering | (United States) Olindo Iacobelli (France) Jean-Louis Ricci | Ford DFL 3.3L V8 | **A** | 120 |
| 26 DNF | GTP | 201 | (Japan) Mazdaspeed | (Japan) Yojiro Terada (Japan) Yoshimi Katayama (Belgium) Pierre Dieudonné | Mazda 757 | **D** | 114 |
| 26 DNF | GTP | 201 | (Japan) Mazdaspeed | (Japan) Yojiro Terada (Japan) Yoshimi Katayama (Belgium) Pierre Dieudonné | Mazda 13J 2.6L 4-Rotor | **D** | 114 |
| 27 DNF | C1 | 36 | (Japan) Toyota Team Tom's | (Japan) Masanori Sekiya (United Kingdom) Geoff Lees (Australia) Alan Jones | Toyota 87C | **B** | 100 |
| 27 DNF | C1 | 36 | (Japan) Toyota Team Tom's | (Japan) Masanori Sekiya (United Kingdom) Geoff Lees (Australia) Alan Jones | Toyota 3S-GTM 2.1L Turbo I4 | **B** | 100 |
| 28 DNF | C1 | 7 | (Germany) Joest Racing | (Germany) Harald Grohs (France) Bob Wollek | Porsche 962C | **G** | 81 |
| 28 DNF | C1 | 7 | (Germany) Joest Racing | (Germany) Harald Grohs (France) Bob Wollek | Porsche Type-935 3.0L Turbo Flat-6 | **G** | 81 |
| 29 DNF | C1 | 2 | (Switzerland) Brun Motorsport | (Germany) Manuel Reuter (Germany) Uwe Schäfer (Spain) Jesús Pareja | Porsche 962C | **MI** | 65 |
| 29 DNF | C1 | 2 | (Switzerland) Brun Motorsport | (Germany) Manuel Reuter (Germany) Uwe Schäfer (Spain) Jesús Pareja | Porsche Type-935 3.0L Turbo Flat-6 | **MI** | 65 |
| 30 DNF | C1 | 20 | (United Kingdom) Tiga Team | (United Kingdom) Tim Lee-Davey (Japan) Tetsuya Oota | Tiga GC87 | **D** | 65 |
| 30 DNF | C1 | 20 | (United Kingdom) Tiga Team | (United Kingdom) Tim Lee-Davey (Japan) Tetsuya Oota | Ford Cosworth DFL 3.3L Turbo V8 | **D** | 65 |
| 31 DNF | C1 | 45 | (Japan) Auto Beaurex Motorsport | (Japan) Kaoru Hoshino (United Kingdom) Will Hoy | Tom's 86C | **D** | 60 |
| 31 DNF | C1 | 45 | (Japan) Auto Beaurex Motorsport | (Japan) Kaoru Hoshino (United Kingdom) Will Hoy | Toyota 3S-GTM 2.1L Turbo I4 | **D** | 60 |
| 32 DNF | C2 | 170 | (Japan) Batsu Racing Team | (Japan) Kazuhiko Oda (Japan) Syuuji Fujii (Japan) Ichirou Mizuno | MCS Guppy | ? | 58 |
| 32 DNF | C2 | 170 | (Japan) Batsu Racing Team | (Japan) Kazuhiko Oda (Japan) Syuuji Fujii (Japan) Ichirou Mizuno | Mazda Rotor | ? | 58 |
| 33 DNF | C2 | 151 | (Japan) British Barn Racing Team | (Japan) Jirou Yoneyama (Japan) Hideshi Matsuda (Japan) Kiyoshi Misaki | JTK 62C | **D** | 41 |
| 33 DNF | C2 | 151 | (Japan) British Barn Racing Team | (Japan) Jirou Yoneyama (Japan) Hideshi Matsuda (Japan) Kiyoshi Misaki | Ford Cosworth DFL 3.3L V8 | **D** | 41 |
| 34 DNF | C2 | 198 | (United Kingdom) Roy Baker Promotion | (United Kingdom) David Andrews (Belgium) Patrick de Radigues | Tiga GC286 | **A** | 38 |
| 34 DNF | C2 | 198 | (United Kingdom) Roy Baker Promotion | (United Kingdom) David Andrews (Belgium) Patrick de Radigues | Ford Cosworth DFL 3.3L V8 | **A** | 38 |
| 35 DNF | C2 | 104 | (Germany) URD Junior Team | (Germany) Hellmut Mundas (United Kingdom) Robin Smith | URD C81/83 | **A** | 22 |
| 35 DNF | C2 | 104 | (Germany) URD Junior Team | (Germany) Hellmut Mundas (United Kingdom) Robin Smith | BMW M88 3.5L I6 | **A** | 22 |
| 36 DNF | C1 | 38 | (Japan) Dome Motorsport | (United States) Ross Cheever (Sweden) Eje Elgh | Dome 87C | **B** | 15 |
| 36 DNF | C1 | 38 | (Japan) Dome Motorsport | (United States) Ross Cheever (Sweden) Eje Elgh | Toyota 3S-GTM 2.1L Turbo I4 | **B** | 15 |
| 37 DNF | C1 | 32 | (Japan) NISMO | (Japan) Masahiro Hasemi (Japan) Aguri Suzuki | Nissan R87E | **B** | 2 |
| 37 DNF | C1 | 32 | (Japan) NISMO | (Japan) Masahiro Hasemi (Japan) Aguri Suzuki | Nissan VEJ30 3.0L Turbo V6 | **B** | 2 |
| DNS | C1 | 37 | (Japan) Toyota Team Tom's | (Japan) Nobuhide Tachi (Japan) Masanori Sekiya | Toyota 87C | **B** | - |
| DNS | C1 | 37 | (Japan) Toyota Team Tom's | (Japan) Nobuhide Tachi (Japan) Masanori Sekiya | Toyota 3S-GTM 2.1L Turbo I4 | **B** | - |

== Statistics ==
- Pole Position - #28 Person's Racing Team - 1:19.021
- Fastest Lap - #36 Toyota Team Tom's - 1:23.096
- Average Speed - 176.216 km/h

World Sportscar Championship
| Previous race: 1987 1000 km of Spa | 1987 season | Next race: None |

All Japan Sports Prototype Championship
| Previous race: 1987 1000 km of Suzuka | 1987 season | Next race: 1987 500 km of Fuji |
