= 1987 All Japan Sports Prototype Car Endurance Championship =

Seasons
- ← 1986 1988 →

The 1987 All Japan Sports Prototype Car Endurance Championship was the fifth season of the All Japan Sports Prototype Championship. The 1987 champion was the #1 Advan Alpha Nova Porsche 962C driven by Kunimitsu Takahashi.

== Entry list ==
=== C/LD-1 ===
- For the WEC-Japan event, JSPC teams used different car numbers to avoid conflicts with the car numbers of the entrants of the World Sportscar Championship; each car's WEC-Japan race number is displayed in tooltips.

Team	Make	Car	Engine	No.	Drivers	Tyre	Rounds
Alpha Nova Racing	Porsche	Porsche 962C	Porsche 935/82 3.0 L Twin Turbo F6	1	(Japan) Kunimitsu Takahashi	Y	All
Alpha Nova Racing	Porsche	Porsche 962C	Porsche 935/82 3.0 L Twin Turbo F6	1	(Japan) Kazuo Mogi	Y	All
Alpha Nova Racing	Porsche	Porsche 962C	Porsche 935/82 3.0 L Twin Turbo F6	1	(United Kingdom) Kenny Acheson	Y	5
Alpha Cubic Racing Team	Porsche	Porsche 962C	Porsche 935/82 3.0 L Twin Turbo F6	2	(Japan) Naoki Nagasaka	B	All
Alpha Cubic Racing Team	Porsche	Porsche 962C	Porsche 935/82 3.0 L Twin Turbo F6	2	(Japan) Chiyomi Totani	B	All
Alpha Cubic Racing Team	Porsche	Porsche 962C	Porsche 935/82 3.0 L Twin Turbo F6	2	(Japan) Taku Akaike	B	4
Alpha Cubic Racing Team	Porsche	Porsche 962C	Porsche 935/82 3.0 L Twin Turbo F6	2	(Japan) Hitoshi Ogawa	B	5
Auto Beaurex Motorsport	Toyota	TOM'S 86C	Toyota 3S-GT 2.1 L Turbo I4	3	(United Kingdom) Will Hoy	D	All
Auto Beaurex Motorsport	Toyota	TOM'S 86C	Toyota 3S-GT 2.1 L Turbo I4	3	(Japan) Kaoru Hoshino	D	1–5
Auto Beaurex Motorsport	Toyota	TOM'S 86C	Toyota 3S-GT 2.1 L Turbo I4	3	(United Kingdom) Andrew Gilbert-Scott	D	6
Best House Racing Team	LeMans	LeMans LM07C	Toyota 3S-GT 2.1 L Turbo I4	7	(Japan) Osamu Nakako	Y	All
Best House Racing Team	LeMans	LeMans LM07C	Toyota 3S-GT 2.1 L Turbo I4	7	(Brazil) Maurizio Sandro Sala	Y	1–5
Best House Racing Team	LeMans	LeMans LM07C	Toyota 3S-GT 2.1 L Turbo I4	7	(Japan) Koji Sato	Y	6
Leyton House Racing	Porsche	Porsche 962C	Porsche 935/82 3.0 L Twin Turbo F6	16	(Denmark) Kris Nissen	B	All
Leyton House Racing	Porsche	Porsche 962C	Porsche 935/82 3.0 L Twin Turbo F6	16	(Germany) Volker Weidler	B	1–5
Leyton House Racing	Porsche	Porsche 962C	Porsche 935/82 3.0 L Twin Turbo F6	16	(Argentina) Oscar Larrauri	B	6
Hoshino Racing (Note: Competed as Nissan Motorsports International in Round 5)	Nissan	Nissan R87E	Nissan VEJ30 3.0 L Twin Turbo V8	23	(Japan) Kazuyoshi Hoshino	B	All
Hoshino Racing	Nissan	Nissan R87E	Nissan VEJ30 3.0 L Twin Turbo V8	23	(Japan) Kenji Takahashi	B	All
Hoshino Racing	Nissan	Nissan R87E	Nissan VEJ30 3.0 L Twin Turbo V8	23	(United Kingdom) Dave Scott	B	5
From A Racing	Porsche	Porsche 962C	Porsche 935/82 3.0 L Twin Turbo F6	27	(Japan) Hideki Okada	B	All
From A Racing	Porsche	Porsche 962C	Porsche 935/82 3.0 L Twin Turbo F6	27	(New Zealand) Mike Thackwell	B	1
From A Racing	Porsche	Porsche 962C	Porsche 935/82 3.0 L Twin Turbo F6	27	(Denmark) John Nielsen	B	2–6
Person's Racing Team	Nissan	Nissan R86V	Nissan VG30T 3.0 L Twin Turbo V6	28	(Japan) Takao Wada	Y	3–6
Person's Racing Team	Nissan	Nissan R86V	Nissan VG30T 3.0 L Twin Turbo V6	28	(Sweden) Anders Olofsson	Y	3–6
Hasemi Motorsport	Nissan	Nissan R86V	Nissan VG30T 3.0 L Twin Turbo V6	32	(Japan) Masahiro Hasemi	B	1
Hasemi Motorsport	Nissan	Nissan R86V	Nissan VG30T 3.0 L Twin Turbo V6	32	(Japan) Aguri Suzuki	B	1
Hasemi Motorsport	Nissan	Nissan R87E	Nissan VEJ30 3.0 L Twin Turbo V8	32	(Japan) Masahiro Hasemi	B	2–6
Hasemi Motorsport	Nissan	Nissan R87E	Nissan VEJ30 3.0 L Twin Turbo V8	32	(Japan) Aguri Suzuki	B	2–6
Toyota Team TOM'S	Toyota	Toyota 87C	Toyota 3S-GT 2.1 L Turbo I4	36	(United Kingdom) Geoff Lees	B	All
Toyota Team TOM'S	Toyota	Toyota 87C	Toyota 3S-GT 2.1 L Turbo I4	36	(Australia) Alan Jones	B	1–3, 5
Toyota Team TOM'S	Toyota	Toyota 87C	Toyota 3S-GT 2.1 L Turbo I4	36	(Japan) Masanori Sekiya	B	2–3, 5
Toyota Team TOM'S	Toyota	Toyota 87C	Toyota 3S-GT 2.1 L Turbo I4	36	(Japan) Hitoshi Ogawa	B	4
Toyota Team TOM'S	Toyota	Toyota 87C	Toyota 3S-GT 2.1 L Turbo I4	36	(Italy) Mauro Baldi	B	6
Toyota Team TOM'S	Toyota	Toyota 87C	Toyota 3S-GT 2.1 L Turbo I4	37	(Japan) Masanori Sekiya	B	5–6
Toyota Team TOM'S	Toyota	Toyota 87C	Toyota 3S-GT 2.1 L Turbo I4	37	(Japan) Nobuhide Tachi	B	5
Toyota Team TOM'S	Toyota	Toyota 87C	Toyota 3S-GT 2.1 L Turbo I4	37	(Japan) Hitoshi Ogawa	B	6
Dome	Toyota	Toyota 87C	Toyota 3S-GT 2.1 L Turbo I4	38	(Sweden) Eje Elgh	D	1–5
Dome	Toyota	Toyota 87C	Toyota 3S-GT 2.1 L Turbo I4	38	(United States) Ross Cheever	D	1–5
Dome	Toyota	Toyota 87C	Toyota 3S-GT 2.1 L Turbo I4	38	(Italy) Paolo Barilla	D	6
Dome	Toyota	Toyota 87C	Toyota 3S-GT 2.1 L Turbo I4	38	(Japan) Yoshiyasu Tachi	D	6
SARD	SARD	SARD MC87S	Toyota 4T-GT 2.1 L Turbo I4	50	(Japan) Shuroku Sasaki	D	All
SARD	SARD	SARD MC87S	Toyota 4T-GT 2.1 L Turbo I4	50	(Japan) Taku Akaike	D	1
SARD	SARD	SARD MC87S	Toyota 4T-GT 2.1 L Turbo I4	50	(United Kingdom) David Sears	D	2–3, 5–6
SARD	SARD	SARD MC87S	Toyota 4T-GT 2.1 L Turbo I4	50	(Japan) Tsunehisa Asai	D	3–6
Rothmans Porsche Team Schuppan	Porsche	Porsche 962C	Porsche 935/82 3.0 L Twin Turbo F6	99	(Australia) Geoff Brabham	D	5–6
Rothmans Porsche Team Schuppan	Porsche	Porsche 962C	Porsche 935/82 3.0 L Twin Turbo F6	99	(United Kingdom) Derek Bell	D	5
Rothmans Porsche Team Schuppan	Porsche	Porsche 962C	Porsche 935/82 3.0 L Twin Turbo F6	99	(Sweden) Eje Elgh	D	6
Trust Racing Team	Porsche	Porsche 962C	Porsche 935/82 3.0 L Twin Turbo F6	100	(Australia) Vern Schuppan	D	All
Trust Racing Team	Porsche	Porsche 962C	Porsche 935/82 3.0 L Twin Turbo F6	100	(Japan) Keiichi Suzuki	D	All
Trust Racing Team	Porsche	Porsche 962C	Porsche 935/82 3.0 L Twin Turbo F6	100	(United Kingdom) James Weaver	D	4–5
Mazdaspeed	Mazda	Mazda 757E	Mazda RE13G 2.0 L 3-rotor	201	(Japan) Yoshimi Katayama	D	1–5
Mazdaspeed	Mazda	Mazda 757E	Mazda RE13G 2.0 L 3-rotor	201	(Japan) Yojiro Terada	D	1–5
Mazdaspeed	Mazda	Mazda 757E	Mazda RE13G 2.0 L 3-rotor	201	(Belgium) Pierre Dieudonné	D	2–5
Mazdaspeed	Mazda	Mazda 757E	Mazda RE13G 2.0 L 3-rotor	202	(Japan) Takashi Yorino	D	All
Mazdaspeed	Mazda	Mazda 757E	Mazda RE13G 2.0 L 3-rotor	202	(Republic of Ireland) David Kennedy	D	All
Mazdaspeed	Mazda	Mazda 757E	Mazda RE13G 2.0 L 3-rotor	207	(Japan) Yoshimi Katayama	D	6
Mazdaspeed	Mazda	Mazda 757E	Mazda RE13G 2.0 L 3-rotor	207	(Japan) Yojiro Terada	D	6

=== B/LD-2 ===
Team	Make	Car	Engine	No.	Drivers	Tyre	Rounds
British Barn Racing Team (Note: Competed as #171 in Group LD-1 in Rd. 3)	British Barn	British Barn JTK 62C	Ford DFL 3.3 L V8	151	(Japan) Jiro Yoneyama	D	3–6
British Barn Racing Team	British Barn	British Barn JTK 62C	Ford DFL 3.3 L V8	151	(Japan) Hideshi Matsuda	D	3, 5
British Barn Racing Team	British Barn	British Barn JTK 62C	Ford DFL 3.3 L V8	151	(Japan) Katsunori Iketani	D	3
British Barn Racing Team	British Barn	British Barn JTK 62C	Ford DFL 3.3 L V8	151	(Japan) Kiyoshi Misaki	D	4–5
British Barn Racing Team	British Barn	British Barn JTK 62C	Ford DFL 3.3 L V8	151	(Japan) Hideo Fukuyama	D	6
Ba-Tsu Racing Team (Note: Competed as #70 from Rd. 1–4)	MCS	MCS Guppy	Mazda RE13B 1.3 L 2-rotor	170	(Japan) Shuji Fujii	D	All
Ba-Tsu Racing Team	MCS	MCS Guppy	Mazda RE13B 1.3 L 2-rotor	170	(Japan) Seiichi Sodeyama	D	1–4, 6
Ba-Tsu Racing Team	MCS	MCS Guppy	Mazda RE13B 1.3 L 2-rotor	170	(Japan) Ichiro Mizuno	D	3, 5
Ba-Tsu Racing Team	MCS	MCS Guppy	Mazda RE13B 1.3 L 2-rotor	170	(Japan) Kazuhiko Oda	D	4–6
Shizumatsu Racing (Note: Competed as #85 from Rd. 1–4)	Mazda	Mazda 737C	Mazda RE13B 1.3 L 2-rotor	285	(Japan) Tetsuji Shiratori	D	2–3, 5–6
Shizumatsu Racing	Mazda	Mazda 737C	Mazda RE13B 1.3 L 2-rotor	285	(Japan) Kaneyuki Okamoto	D	2–3, 5–6
Shizumatsu Racing	Mazda	Mazda 737C	Mazda RE13B 1.3 L 2-rotor	285	(Japan) Mitsuaki Tonoka	D	3–6

=== A/LD-3 ===
Team	Make	Car	Engine	No.	Drivers	Tyre	Rounds
Shinryo Auto	West	West 85S	Mazda RE13B 1.3 L 2-rotor	6	(Japan) Hideki Uemura	B	1
Shinryo Auto	West	West 85S	Mazda RE13B 1.3 L 2-rotor	6	(Japan) Yoshiyuki Ogura	B	1
Shinryo Auto	West	West 87S	Mazda RE13B 1.3 L 2-rotor	6	(Japan) Hideki Uemura	B	4
Shinryo Auto	West	West 87S	Mazda RE13B 1.3 L 2-rotor	6	(Japan) Akihiro Matsuda	B	4
Auto Kamida (Note: Competed as #30 in Rd. 1)	West	West 87S	Mazda RE13B 1.3 L 2-rotor	8	(Japan) Isao Nakahira	Y	1, 4
Auto Kamida	West	West 87S	Mazda RE13B 1.3 L 2-rotor	8	(Japan) Kenji Kuroki	Y	1
Auto Kamida	West	West 87S	Mazda RE13B 1.3 L 2-rotor	8	(Japan) Koji Sato	Y	4
Katayama Racing	Oscar	Oscar SK85	Mazda RE13B 1.3 L 2-rotor	9	(Japan) Soichiro Tanaka	D	1, 4
Katayama Racing	Oscar	Oscar SK85	Mazda RE13B 1.3 L 2-rotor	9	(Japan) Hiroaki Ishii	D	1, 4
Katayama Racing	Oscar	Oscar SK85	Mazda RE13B 1.3 L 2-rotor	9	(Japan) Kazuo Emi	D	4
M505/Eibo	Porsche	Porsche 924	Porsche M44/40 2.5 L I4	11	(Japan) Masaatsu Oya	D	3, 6
M505/Eibo	Porsche	Porsche 924	Porsche M44/40 2.5 L I4	11	(Japan) Kinji Suzuki	D	3, 6
M505/Eibo	Porsche	Porsche 924	Porsche M44/40 2.5 L I4	11	(Japan) Tetsuya Kawasaki	D	3, 6
Team RS Kamata with Technica	West	West 83S	Mazda RE13B 1.3 L 2-rotor	11	(Japan) Naonori Naekawa	B	4
Team RS Kamata with Technica	West	West 83S	Mazda RE13B 1.3 L 2-rotor	11	(Japan) Tomoaki Niimi	B	4
Unicorn Racing	Maxim	Maxim 61S	Mazda RE13B 1.3 L 2-rotor	17	(Japan) Masami Shirai	D	6
Unicorn Racing	Maxim	Maxim 61S	Mazda RE13B 1.3 L 2-rotor	17	(Japan) Shunji Abe	D	6
Unicorn Racing	Maxim	Maxim 61S	Mazda RE13B 1.3 L 2-rotor	17	(Japan) Tetsuya Nakajima	D	6
Pro Staff/Hobby R	Oscar	Oscar SK85	Mazda RE13B 1.3 L 2-rotor	18	(Japan) Yuzo Kamata	D	4
Pro Staff/Hobby R	Oscar	Oscar SK85	Mazda RE13B 1.3 L 2-rotor	18	(Japan) Hajime Oshiro	D	4
Pro Staff/Hobby R	Oscar	Oscar SK85	Mazda RE13B 1.3 L 2-rotor	18	(Japan) Yoshiyuki Ogura	D	4
Superman	Oscar	Oscar SK85	Mazda RE13B 1.3 L 2-rotor	19	(Japan) Shinichi Takahisa	Y	4
Superman	Oscar	Oscar SK85	Mazda RE13B 1.3 L 2-rotor	19	(Japan) Seiichi Sodeyama	Y	4
Superman	Oscar	Oscar SK85	Mazda RE13B 1.3 L 2-rotor	19	(Japan) Masami Miyoshi	Y	4
ADVAN/PIAA	West	West 85S	Mazda RE13B 1.3 L 2-rotor	20	(Japan) Kenichi Kaneko	Y	4
ADVAN/PIAA	West	West 85S	Mazda RE13B 1.3 L 2-rotor	20	(Japan) Tsuguaki Ogura	Y	4
ADVAN/PIAA	West	West 85S	Mazda RE13B 1.3 L 2-rotor	20	(Japan) Masakazu Okawa	Y	4
Cosmos/Motul	Oscar	Oscar SK85	Mazda RE13B 1.3 L 2-rotor	22	(Japan) Yoshihide Fukuyasu	D	4
Cosmos/Motul	Oscar	Oscar SK85	Mazda RE13B 1.3 L 2-rotor	22	(Japan) Toshihiko Mochizuki	D	4
Cosmos/Motul	Oscar	Oscar SK85	Mazda RE13B 1.3 L 2-rotor	22	(Japan) Yoichiro Suzuki	D	4
Matsumoto Hikkoshi Center	Oscar	Oscar SK85	Mazda RE13B 1.3 L 2-rotor	29	(Japan) Norihiro Takeda	D	1
Matsumoto Hikkoshi Center	Oscar	Oscar SK85	Mazda RE13B 1.3 L 2-rotor	29	(Japan) Ichiro Mizuno	D	1
Mazda Sport Car Club	Mazda	Mazda RX-7 254	Mazda RE13B 1.3 L 2-rotor	30	(Japan) Iwao Sugai	D	2–4, 6
Mazda Sport Car Club	Mazda	Mazda RX-7 254	Mazda RE13B 1.3 L 2-rotor	30	(Japan) Hiroshi Sugai	D	2–4, 6
Mazda Sport Car Club	Mazda	Mazda RX-7 254	Mazda RE13B 1.3 L 2-rotor	30	(Japan) Takeshi Yamazaki	D	4
Horii Racing	West	West 83S-II	Mazda RE13B 1.3 L 2-rotor	31	(Japan) Nobuyoshi Horii	B	1, 4
Horii Racing	West	West 83S-II	Mazda RE13B 1.3 L 2-rotor	31	(Japan) Hajime Kajiwara	B	1, 4
Takada Bakery	Oscar	Oscar SK85	Mazda RE13B 1.3 L 2-rotor	33	(Japan) Kazuo Fujita	D	4
Takada Bakery	Oscar	Oscar SK85	Mazda RE13B 1.3 L 2-rotor	33	(Japan) Seiji Imoto	D	4
Takada Bakery	Oscar	Oscar SK85	Mazda RE13B 1.3 L 2-rotor	33	(Japan) Tadao Yamauchi	D	4
Yoshioka Seikei Geka	Mazda	Mazda RX-7 253	Mazda RE13B 1.3 L 2-rotor	33	(Japan) Tatsuki Yoshioka	Y	6
Yoshioka Seikei Geka	Mazda	Mazda RX-7 253	Mazda RE13B 1.3 L 2-rotor	33	(Japan) Kazuyuki Yoshizaki	Y	6
Tomiyasu Shofuku	West	West 83S-II	Mazda RE13B 1.3 L 2-rotor	35	(Japan) Mitsutaka Hayakawa	B	1
Tomiyasu Shofuku	West	West 83S-II	Mazda RE13B 1.3 L 2-rotor	35	(Japan) Masatoshi Yamaguchi	B	1
Rev Racing	Oscar	Oscar SK85	Mazda RE13B 1.3 L 2-rotor	47	(Japan) Seiji Imoto	D	1
Rev Racing	Oscar	Oscar SK85	Mazda RE13B 1.3 L 2-rotor	47	(Japan) Tadao Yamauchi	D	1
I World	Oscar	Oscar SK85	Mazda RE13B 1.3 L 2-rotor	48	(Japan) Keiichi Mizutani	Y	1, 3–4, 6
I World	Oscar	Oscar SK85	Mazda RE13B 1.3 L 2-rotor	48	(Japan) Motozo Fujikawa	Y	1, 3–4, 6
Mazda Auto Nishi Tokyo	Mazda	Mazda RX-7 254	Mazda RE13B 1.3 L 2-rotor	55	(Japan) Shigeru Miura	D	2–3, 6
Mazda Auto Nishi Tokyo	Mazda	Mazda RX-7 254	Mazda RE13B 1.3 L 2-rotor	55	(Japan) Kinji Suzuki	D	2
Mazda Auto Nishi Tokyo	Mazda	Mazda RX-7 254	Mazda RE13B 1.3 L 2-rotor	55	(Japan) Toshihiro Fukuzawa	D	3, 6
Tomei Jidosha	Nissan	Nissan Sunny	Nissan A12 1.3 L I4	71	(Japan) Yoshiaki Jitsukawa	D	2–3, 6
Tomei Jidosha	Nissan	Nissan Sunny	Nissan A12 1.3 L I4	71	(Japan) Shinya Nishizawa	D	2–3, 6
Tomei Jidosha	Nissan	Nissan Sunny	Nissan A12 1.3 L I4	71	(Japan) Michie Shinbori	D	2–3
Tomei Jidosha	Nissan	Nissan Sunny	Nissan A12 1.3 L I4	71	(Japan) Masao Endo	D	6
Shasta Cola	Mazda	Mazda RX-7 254	Mazda RE13B 1.3 L 2-rotor	72	(Japan) Yu Konishi	Y	2–3
Shasta Cola	Mazda	Mazda RX-7 254	Mazda RE13B 1.3 L 2-rotor	72	(Japan) Masami Shirai	Y	2–3
Shasta Cola	Mazda	Mazda RX-7 254	Mazda RE13B 1.3 L 2-rotor	72	(Japan) Shunji Abe	Y	2–3
Fam Speed	Maxim	Maxim 61S	Mazda RE13B 1.3 L 2-rotor	74	(Japan) Terumitsu Fujieda	D	2
Fam Speed	Maxim	Maxim 61S	Mazda RE13B 1.3 L 2-rotor	74	(Japan) Zenkichi Maruko	D	2
Fam Speed	Maxim	Maxim 61S	Mazda RE13B 1.3 L 2-rotor	74	(Japan) Atsushi Hayakawa	D	2
Mazda Auto Tokyo (Note: Competed as #73 in Rd. 1)	West	West 85S	Mazda RE13B 1.3 L 2-rotor	77	(Japan) Toshihiko Nogami	D	2–4, 6
Mazda Auto Tokyo	West	West 85S	Mazda RE13B 1.3 L 2-rotor	77	(Japan) Hideyuki Tamamoto	D	2–4, 6
Koyata Engei Racing	Mazda	Mazda RX-7 254	Mazda RE13B 1.3 L 2-rotor	80	(Japan) Shigeru Yokoyama	B	3, 6
Koyata Engei Racing	Mazda	Mazda RX-7 254	Mazda RE13B 1.3 L 2-rotor	80	(Japan) Kenichi Suzuki	B	3, 6
Koyata Engei Racing	Mazda	Mazda RX-7 254	Mazda RE13B 1.3 L 2-rotor	80	(Japan) Akio Yokoyama	B	3
Cosmos/Woodpecker (Note: Competed as #67 in Rd. 1)	West	West 87S	Mazda RE13B 1.3 L 2-rotor	87	(Japan) Yoshifumi Yamazaki	D	1, 4
Cosmos/Woodpecker	West	West 87S	Mazda RE13B 1.3 L 2-rotor	87	(Japan) Masaki Ohashi	D	1, 4
Cosmos/Woodpecker	West	West 87S	Mazda RE13B 1.3 L 2-rotor	87	(Japan) Naoto Chikada	D	4

== Schedule ==
All races were held in Japan.

Round	Race	Circuit	Date
1	International Suzuka 500 km	Suzuka Circuit	12 April
2	All Japan Fuji 1000 km	Fuji Speedway	3 May
3	All Japan Fuji 500 Miles	Fuji Speedway	19 July
4	International Suzuka 1000 km	Suzuka Circuit	23 August
5	WEC-Japan	Fuji Speedway	27 September
6	All Japan Fuji 500 km	Fuji Speedway	29 November

== Season results ==
Season results as follows:

Round	Circuit	Winning team
Round	Circuit	Winning drivers
1	Suzuka Circuit; Report	#27 FromA Racing Porsche 962C
1	Suzuka Circuit; Report	(Japan) Hideki Okada (New Zealand) Mike Thackwell
2	Mt. Fuji; Report	#36 Toyota Team TOM'S Toyota 87C
2	Mt. Fuji; Report	(Japan) Masanori Sekiya (Australia) Alan Jones (United Kingdom) Geoff Lees
3	Mt. Fuji	#1 Alpha Nova Porsche 962C
3	Mt. Fuji	(Japan) Kunimitsu Takahashi (United Kingdom) Kenny Acheson
4	Suzuka Circuit; Report	#36 Toyota Team TOM'S Toyota 87C
4	Suzuka Circuit; Report	(Japan) Masanori Sekiya (Japan) Hitoshi Ogawa (United Kingdom) Geoff Lees
5	Mt. Fuji; Report	#5 Tom Walkinshaw Racing Jaguar XJR-8
5	Mt. Fuji; Report	(United Kingdom) John Watson (Netherlands) Jan Lammers
6	Mt. Fuji	#1 Alpha Nova Porsche 962C
6	Mt. Fuji	(Japan) Kunimitsu Takahashi (United Kingdom) Kenny Acheson

== Point Ranking ==
=== Drivers ===
Rank	Drivers	Number/Team	Points	Wins	Distance
1	(Japan) Kunimitsu Takahashi	#1 Alpha Nova Porsche 962C	59	2	1825.339 km
2	(United Kingdom) Kenny Acheson	#1 Alpha Nova Porsche 962C	59	2	1155.306 km
3	(United Kingdom) Geoff Lees	#36 Toyota Team TOM'S Toyota 87C	52	2	
4	(Japan) Hideki Okada	#27 FromA Racing Porsche 962C	46	1	
5	(Japan) Masanori Sekiya	#36 Toyota Team TOM'S Toyota 87C #37 Toyota Team TOM'S Toyota 87C	40	2	
6	(Australia) Vern Schuppan	#100 Trust Racing Team Porsche 962C	36.5	0	1568.307 km

=== Makes ===
Rank	Make	Points	Wins
1	Porsche	70	3
2	Toyota	52	2
3	Mazda	34	0
4	March-Nissan	22	0
5	Jaguar	20	1
6	LM-Toyota	8.5	0
7	TOM'S-Toyota	8	0
8	Dome-Toyota	7	0
9	SARD-Toyota	7	0
