= 1987 Suzuka 500 km =

Layout of the Suzuka International Racing Course (1987-2002)

The Suzuka 500 km, was the opening round of the 1987 All Japan Sports Prototype Championship was held at the Suzuka Circuit, on 12 April, in front of a crowd of approximately 18,000.

== Report ==
=== Entry ===
A total of 24 cars were entered for the event, across three classes ranging from Local Prototypes to Group C Prototypes.

=== Qualifying ===
The pairing of Hideki Okada and Mike Thackwell took pole position for From A Racing, in their Porsche 962C ahead of the new partnership of Kazuyoshi Hoshino and Kenji Takahashi for Hoshino Racing, in their Nissan R87E, by just 0.42secs.

=== Race ===
The race was held over 85 laps of the Suzuka circuit, a distance of 500 km (actual distance was 502.519 km). Hideki Okada and Mike Thackwell took the winner spoils for From A Racing, driving their Porsche 962C. The pair won in a time of 2hr 57:25.959mins., averaging a speed of 106.206 mph. Second place went to Kunimitsu Takahashi and Kenny Acheson in the Advan Alpha Nova’s Porsche 962C who finished just 2.775 seconds adrift. Also, the lead lap, was the third placed Toyota 87C of Geoff Lees and Alan Jones.

== Classification ==
=== Race result ===
Class Winners are in Bold text.

Pos.	No.	Class	Driver		Entrant	Car - Engine	Time, Laps	Reason Out
1st	**27**	**C**	**(Japan) Hideki Okada**	**(New Zealand) Mike Thackwell**	**From A Racing**	**Porsche 962C**	2hr 57:25.959	
2nd	1	C	(Japan) Kunimitsu Takahashi	(Northern Ireland) Kenny Acheson	Advan Alpha Nove	Porsche 962C	2hr 57:28.734	
3rd	36	C	(England) Geoff Lees	(Australia) Alan Jones	Toyota Team TOM’s	Toyota 87C	2hr 58:29.226	
4th	16	C	(Denmark) Kris Nissen	(Germany) Volker Weidler	Leyton House Racing Team	Porsche 962C	84	
5th	202	C	(Japan) Takashi Yorino	(Republic of Ireland) David Kennedy	Mazdaspeed	Mazda 757	84	
6th	201	C	(Japan) Yoshimi Katayama	(Japan) Yojiro Terada	Mazdaspeed	Mazda 757	84	
7th	2	C	(Japan) Chiyomi Totani	(Japan) Naoki Nagasaka	Alpha Cubic Racing Team	Porsche 962C	82	
8th	32'	C	(Japan) Aguri Suzuki	(Japan) Masahiro Hasemi	Hasemi Motorsport	Nissan R86V	80	
9th	**70**	**B**	**(Japan) Seiichi Sodeyama**	**(Japan) Syuuji Fujii**	**Batsu Racing Team**	**MCS Guppy-Mazda**	**75**	
10th	100	C	(Australia) Vern Schuppan	(Japan) Keiichi Suzuki	Trust Racing Team	Porsche 962C	75	
11th	**67**	**A**	**(Japan) Yoshifumi Yamazaki**	**(Japan) Masaki Oohashi**		**West-Mazda 87S**	74	
12th	29	A	(Japan) Norihiro Yamazaki	(Japan) Kenji Mizuno		Oscar-Mazda SK85	74	
13th	48	A	(Japan) Keiichi Mizutani	(Japan) Motozou Fujikawa		Oscar-Mazda SK85	73	
14th	30	A	(Japan) Isao Nakahira	(Japan) Kenji Kuroki		West-Mazda 87S	73	
15th	6	A	(Japan) Hideki Uemura	(Japan) Yoshiyuki Ogura		West-Mazda 85S	71	
16th	38	C	(Sweden) Eje Elgh	(United States) Ross Cheever	Dome Motorsport	Dome Motorsport-Toyota 87C	71	
17th	31	A	(Japan) Nobuyoshi Horil	(Japan) Hajime Kajiwara	Horil Racing	West-Mazda 83S II	71	
18th	47	A	(Japan) Seiji Imoto	(Japan) Tadao Yamauchi	Rev Racing	Oscar-Mazda SK85	70	
19th	35	A	(Japan) Mitsutuka Hayakawa	(Japan) Masatoshi Yamaguchi		West-Mazda 83S II	70	
20th	7	C	(Japan) Osamu Nakako	(Brazil) Maurizio Sandro Sala	Best House Racing Team	LM-Toyota 07	63	
DNF	50	C	(Japan) Syuuroku Saski	(Japan) Taku Akaike	SARD	SARD-Toyota MC87S	52	Driveshaft
DNF	8	C	(Japan) Takao Wada	(Sweden) Anders Olofsson	Person’s Racing Team	Nissan R86V	31	Oil Leak
DNF	23	C	(Japan) Kazuyoshi Hoshino	(Japan) Kenji Takahashi	Hoshino Racing	Nissan R87E	17	Drivesharft
DNF	9	A	(Japan) Souichirou Tanaka	(Japan) Hiroaki Ishii	Katayama Racing	Oscar-Mazda SK85	15	Retire
DNS	37	C	(England) Geoff Lees	(Japan) Masanori Sekiya	Toyota Team TOM’s	TOM’s-Toyota 87C		Withdrawn
