= 1991 24 Hours of Daytona =

30th 24 Hours of Daytona

| Previous: 1990 | Next: 1992 |
Index: Races | Winners

Track map of Daytona International Speedway

The 1991 SunBank 24 at Daytona was a 24-hour endurance sports car race held on February 2–3, 1991 at the Daytona International Speedway road course. The race served as the opening round of the 1991 IMSA GT Championship.

Victory overall and in the GTP class went to the No. 7 Joest Racing Porsche 962 driven by Frank Jelinski, Henri Pescarolo, Hurley Haywood, Bob Wollek and "John Winter". Victory in the LM class went to the No. 83 Nissan Performance Technology Nissan R90CK driven by Bob Earl, Derek Daly, Chip Robinson, and Geoff Brabham. Victory in the GTP Lights class went to the No. 48 Acura Spice SE90P driven by Parker Johnstone, Steve Cameron, Doug Peterson, and Bob Lesnett. The GTO class was won by the No. 15 Whistler Mustang Ford Mustang driven by Mark Martin, Wally Dallenbach Jr., and Robby Gordon. Finally, the GTU class was won by the No. 82 Greer Racing Mazda RX-7 driven by Dick Greer, Al Bacon, Mike Mees, and Peter Uria.

== Race results ==
Class winners in bold.

| Pos | Class | No | Team | Drivers | Chassis | Tyre | Laps |
| Pos | Class | No | Team | Drivers | Engine | Tyre | Laps |
|---|---|---|---|---|---|---|---|
| 1 | **GTP** | **7** | (Germany) **Joest Racing** | (Germany) **Frank Jelinski** (France) **Henri Pescarolo** (United States) **Hurley Haywood** (France) **Bob Wollek** (Germany) **"John Winter"** | **Porsche 962** | G | **719** |
| 1 | **GTP** | **7** | (Germany) **Joest Racing** | (Germany) **Frank Jelinski** (France) **Henri Pescarolo** (United States) **Hurley Haywood** (France) **Bob Wollek** (Germany) **"John Winter"** | **Porsche 962/72 3.0L Flat 6 Twin-Turbo** | G | **719** |
| 2 | **LM** | **83** | (United States) **Nissan Performance Technology** | (United States) **Bob Earl** (Republic of Ireland) **Derek Daly** (United States) **Chip Robinson** (Australia) **Geoff Brabham** | **Nissan R90CK** | G | **701** |
| 2 | **LM** | **83** | (United States) **Nissan Performance Technology** | (United States) **Bob Earl** (Republic of Ireland) **Derek Daly** (United States) **Chip Robinson** (Australia) **Geoff Brabham** | **Nissan VRH35Z 3.5L V8 Twin-Turbo** | G | **701** |
| 3 | GTP | 10 | (United States) Wynn's | (United States) Chris Cord (United States) John Hotchkis (United States) Jim Adams (United States) Rob Dyson | Porsche 962 | G | 692 |
| 3 | GTP | 10 | (United States) Wynn's | (United States) Chris Cord (United States) John Hotchkis (United States) Jim Adams (United States) Rob Dyson | Porsche 962/72 3.0L Flat 6 Twin-Turbo | G | 692 |
| 4 | **GTO** | **15** | (United States) **Roush Racing** | (United States) **Mark Martin** (United States) **Wally Dallenbach Jr.** (United States) **Robby Gordon** | **Ford Mustang** | G | **672** |
| 4 | **GTO** | **15** | (United States) **Roush Racing** | (United States) **Mark Martin** (United States) **Wally Dallenbach Jr.** (United States) **Robby Gordon** | **Ford Roush 5.9L V8 N/A** | G | **672** |
| 5 DNF | GTP | 00 | (Germany) Jochen Dauer Racing | (United States) Michael Andretti (United States) Mario Andretti (United States) Jeff Andretti | Porsche 962 | BF | 663 |
| 5 DNF | GTP | 00 | (Germany) Jochen Dauer Racing | (United States) Michael Andretti (United States) Mario Andretti (United States) Jeff Andretti | Porsche 962/72 3.0L Flat 6 Twin-Turbo | BF | 663 |
| 6 | GTO | 12 | (United States) Whistler Radar | (United States) John Fergus (United States) Max Jones (United States) Dorsey Schroeder | Ford Mustang | G | 658 |
| 6 | GTO | 12 | (United States) Whistler Radar | (United States) John Fergus (United States) Max Jones (United States) Dorsey Schroeder | Ford Roush 5.9L V8 N/A | G | 658 |
| 7 DNF | **Lights** | **48** | (United States) **Acura** | (United States) **Parker Johnstone** (United States) **Steve Cameron** (United States) **Doug Peterson** (United States) **Bob Lesnett** | **Spice SE90P** | BF | **654** |
| 7 DNF | **Lights** | **48** | (United States) **Acura** | (United States) **Parker Johnstone** (United States) **Steve Cameron** (United States) **Doug Peterson** (United States) **Bob Lesnett** | **Acura 3.0L V6 N/A** | BF | **654** |
| 8 | Lights | 36 | (United States) Ecurie Scientific | (United States) John Grooms (United States) Michael Greenfield (United States) Frank Jellinek (United States) Peter Greenfield | Kudzu DG-1 | G | 632 |
| 8 | Lights | 36 | (United States) Ecurie Scientific | (United States) John Grooms (United States) Michael Greenfield (United States) Frank Jellinek (United States) Peter Greenfield | Mazda 13B 1.3L Rotary | G | 632 |
| 9 DNF | Lights | 54 | (United States) HDF Motorsport | (United States) Michael Dow (United Kingdom) Andrew Hepworth (Netherlands) Hendrik ten Cate | Spice SE89P | G | 620 |
| 9 DNF | Lights | 54 | (United States) HDF Motorsport | (United States) Michael Dow (United Kingdom) Andrew Hepworth (Netherlands) Hendrik ten Cate | Buick 3.0L V6 N/A | G | 620 |
| 10 | GTO | 90 | (United States) Roush Racing | (United States) Jim Stevens (United States) Craig Bennett (United States) Tom Grunnah (United States) Jim Jaeger | Ford Mustang | G | 619 |
| 10 | GTO | 90 | (United States) Roush Racing | (United States) Jim Stevens (United States) Craig Bennett (United States) Tom Grunnah (United States) Jim Jaeger | Ford Roush 5.9L V8 N/A | G | 619 |
| 11 | GTP | 4 | (United States) Tom Milner Racing | (United States) Brian Bonner (United States) Derrike Cope (United States) Jeff Kline (United States) Scott Sharp | Spice SE89P | G | 611 |
| 11 | GTP | 4 | (United States) Tom Milner Racing | (United States) Brian Bonner (United States) Derrike Cope (United States) Jeff Kline (United States) Scott Sharp | Chevrolet 6.0L V8 N/A | G | 611 |
| 12 | GTO | 92 | (United States) EDS/Mobil/Goodyear | (United States) R. K. Smith (United States) Andy Pilgrim (United States) Doc Bundy (United States) Joe Varde | Chevrolet Corvette ZR-1 | G | 611 |
| 12 | GTO | 92 | (United States) EDS/Mobil/Goodyear | (United States) R. K. Smith (United States) Andy Pilgrim (United States) Doc Bundy (United States) Joe Varde | Chevrolet LT5 5.7L V8 N/A | G | 611 |
| 13 | GTU | 82 | (United States) Greer Racing | (United States) Dick Greer (United States) Al Bacon (United States) Mike Mees (United States) Peter Uria | Mazda RX-7 | G | 605 |
| 13 | GTU | 82 | (United States) Greer Racing | (United States) Dick Greer (United States) Al Bacon (United States) Mike Mees (United States) Peter Uria | Mazda 13B 1.3L 2-Rotor | G | 605 |
| 14 | GTO | 63 | (United States) Mazda Motorsports | (United Kingdom) Brian Redman (United States) John O'Steen (United States) Price Cobb (United States) Pete Halsmer | Mazda RX-7 | G | 576 |
| 14 | GTO | 63 | (United States) Mazda Motorsports | (United Kingdom) Brian Redman (United States) John O'Steen (United States) Price Cobb (United States) Pete Halsmer | Mazda 13J-M 2.6L 4-Rotor | G | 576 |
| 15 | GTU | 37 | (Colombia) Botero Racing | (Colombia) Honorato Espinosa (New Zealand) Rob Wilson (Cuba) Miguel Morejon (Colombia) Felipe Solano | Mazda MX-6 | Y | 576 |
| 15 | GTU | 37 | (Colombia) Botero Racing | (Colombia) Honorato Espinosa (New Zealand) Rob Wilson (Cuba) Miguel Morejon (Colombia) Felipe Solano | Mazda 13B 1.3L 2-Rotor | Y | 576 |
| 16 | GTU | 38 | (United States) Mandeville Auto Tech | (United States) Roger Mandeville (United States) Amos Johnson (United States) Kelly Marsh | Mazda RX-7 | Y | 568 |
| 16 | GTU | 38 | (United States) Mandeville Auto Tech | (United States) Roger Mandeville (United States) Amos Johnson (United States) Kelly Marsh | Mazda 13B 1.3L 2-Rotor | Y | 568 |
| 17 | Lights | 42 | (United States) Intersport | (Australia) Geoff Nicol (Canada) David Tennyson (United States) Todd Brayton | Tiga GT286 | G | 556 |
| 17 | Lights | 42 | (United States) Intersport | (Australia) Geoff Nicol (Canada) David Tennyson (United States) Todd Brayton | Mazda 13B 1.3L 2-Rotor | G | 556 |
| 18 | Lights | 09 | (United States) R. J. Racing | (United States) Stephen Hynes (United States) Tommy Johnson (United States) Rob Robertson (United Kingdom) John Sheldon | Tiga GC287 | G | 545 |
| 18 | Lights | 09 | (United States) R. J. Racing | (United States) Stephen Hynes (United States) Tommy Johnson (United States) Rob Robertson (United Kingdom) John Sheldon | Buick 3.0L V6 N/A | G | 545 |
| 19 | GTU | 26 | (United States) Border Cantina | (United States) Chris Craft (United States) Alex Job (United States) Joe Pezza (United States) Jack Refenning | Porsche 911 | G | 494 |
| 19 | GTU | 26 | (United States) Border Cantina | (United States) Chris Craft (United States) Alex Job (United States) Joe Pezza (United States) Jack Refenning | Porsche 3.2L Flat 6 N/A | G | 494 |
| 20 DNF | LM | 84 | (United States) Nissan Performance Technology | (United Kingdom) Julian Bailey (New Zealand) Steve Millen (Netherlands) Arie Luyendyk (Canada) Jeremy Dale | Nissan R90CK | G | 472 |
| 20 DNF | LM | 84 | (United States) Nissan Performance Technology | (United Kingdom) Julian Bailey (New Zealand) Steve Millen (Netherlands) Arie Luyendyk (Canada) Jeremy Dale | Nissan VRH35Z 3.5L V8 Twin-Turbo | G | 472 |
| 21 | GTO | 91 | (United States) EDS/Mobil/Goodyear | (United States) Stu Hayner (United States) Don Knowles (United States) John Heinricy (United States) Scott Lagasse (United States) Tommy Morrison | Chevrolet Corvette ZR-1 | G | 464 |
| 21 | GTO | 91 | (United States) EDS/Mobil/Goodyear | (United States) Stu Hayner (United States) Don Knowles (United States) John Heinricy (United States) Scott Lagasse (United States) Tommy Morrison | Chevrolet LT5 6.0L V8 N/A | G | 464 |
| 22 DNF | GTP | 16 | (United States) Dyson Racing | (United Kingdom) James Weaver (United States) John Paul Jr. (United Kingdom) Tiff Needell | Porsche 962 | G | 450 |
| 22 DNF | GTP | 16 | (United States) Dyson Racing | (United Kingdom) James Weaver (United States) John Paul Jr. (United Kingdom) Tiff Needell | Porsche 962/72 3.0L Flat 6 Twin-Turbo | G | 450 |
| 23 | GTU | 72 | (United States) Jay Kjoller Motorsports | (United States) Steve Volk (United States) Jay Kjoller (United States) Patrick Mooney | Porsche 911 | G | 449 |
| 23 | GTU | 72 | (United States) Jay Kjoller Motorsports | (United States) Steve Volk (United States) Jay Kjoller (United States) Patrick Mooney | Porsche 3.2L Flat 6 N/A | G | 449 |
| 24 DNF | GTP | 5 | (United States) Tom Milner Racing | (United States) Mike Brockman (United States) Tim McAdam (United States) Fred Phillips (United States) Jeff Davis | Spice SE89P | G | 448 |
| 24 DNF | GTP | 5 | (United States) Tom Milner Racing | (United States) Mike Brockman (United States) Tim McAdam (United States) Fred Phillips (United States) Jeff Davis | Chevrolet 6.0L V8 N/A | G | 448 |
| 25 | GTO | 70 | (United States) M/J Engineering | (United States) Lou Gigiliotti (United States) Boris Said (United States) Mike Nolan (United States) Roger Schramm (United States) Peter Cunningham | Oldsmobile Cutlass | F | 445 |
| 25 | GTO | 70 | (United States) M/J Engineering | (United States) Lou Gigiliotti (United States) Boris Said (United States) Mike Nolan (United States) Roger Schramm (United States) Peter Cunningham | Oldsmobile 6.0L V8 N/A | F | 445 |
| 26 DNF | GTU | 66 | (United States) North Coast Racing | (United States) Leighton Reese (United States) Mike Gagliardo (United States) Brad Hoyt | Mazda RX-7 | F | 442 |
| 26 DNF | GTU | 66 | (United States) North Coast Racing | (United States) Leighton Reese (United States) Mike Gagliardo (United States) Brad Hoyt | Mazda 13B 1.3L 2-Rotor | F | 442 |
| 27 | GTO | 11 | (United States) Robert Williams | (United States) Jon Gooding (United States) John Annis (United States) Mark Kennedy (United States) Nort Northam (United States) Tom Panaggio | Chevrolet Camaro | G | 427 |
| 27 | GTO | 11 | (United States) Robert Williams | (United States) Jon Gooding (United States) John Annis (United States) Mark Kennedy (United States) Nort Northam (United States) Tom Panaggio | Chevrolet 6.0L V8 N/A | G | 427 |
| 28 DNF | GTP | 98 | (United States) All American Racers | (United States) Mark Dismore (United States) Rocky Moran (United States) P. J. Jones | Eagle HF89 | G | 408 |
| 28 DNF | GTP | 98 | (United States) All American Racers | (United States) Mark Dismore (United States) Rocky Moran (United States) P. J. Jones | Toyota 2.1L I4 Turbo | G | 408 |
| 29 | GTO | 87 | (Canada) A&R Auto Electric | (Canada) Grant Hill (Canada) Nick Holmes (United States) Anthony Puleo (United States) Daniel Urrutia | Chevrolet Camaro | G | 396 |
| 29 | GTO | 87 | (Canada) A&R Auto Electric | (Canada) Grant Hill (Canada) Nick Holmes (United States) Anthony Puleo (United States) Daniel Urrutia | Chevrolet 6.0L V8 N/A | G | 396 |
| 30 DNF | GTP | 2 | (United Kingdom) Bud Light Jaguar Racing | (United States) Davy Jones (United States) Scott Pruett (Brazil) Raul Boesel (United Kingdom) Derek Warwick | Jaguar XJR-12 | G | 379 |
| 30 DNF | GTP | 2 | (United Kingdom) Bud Light Jaguar Racing | (United States) Davy Jones (United States) Scott Pruett (Brazil) Raul Boesel (United Kingdom) Derek Warwick | Jaguar 6.5L V12 N/A | G | 379 |
| 31 DNF | GTP | 6 | (Germany) Joest Racing | (France) Bob Wollek (Germany) Bernd Schneider (Italy) Paolo Barilla (Italy) Massimo Sigala | Porsche 962 | G | 360 |
| 31 DNF | GTP | 6 | (Germany) Joest Racing | (France) Bob Wollek (Germany) Bernd Schneider (Italy) Paolo Barilla (Italy) Massimo Sigala | Porsche 3.0L Flat 6 Twin-Turbo | G | 360 |
| 32 DNF | Lights | 9 | (United States) Essex Racing | (United States) Jim Pace (United States) Tom Hessert Jr. (United States) Charles Morgan | Kudzu DG-1 | G | 359 |
| 32 DNF | Lights | 9 | (United States) Essex Racing | (United States) Jim Pace (United States) Tom Hessert Jr. (United States) Charles Morgan | Buick 3.0L V6 N/A | G | 359 |
| 33 DNF | Lights | 20 | (United States) Carlos Bobeda Racing | (United States) Kaming Ko (United States) Mike Sheehan (United States) Ron McKay (Canada) Charles Monk | Tiga GT287 | G | 328 |
| 33 DNF | Lights | 20 | (United States) Carlos Bobeda Racing | (United States) Kaming Ko (United States) Mike Sheehan (United States) Ron McKay (Canada) Charles Monk | Chevrolet 3.0L V6 N/A | G | 328 |
| 34 | GTO | 45 | (United States) First Coast Trucks | (United States) John Forbes (United States) Ken Fengler (United States) Bob Hundredmark (United States) Tom Curren | Chevrolet Corvette | G | 315 |
| 34 | GTO | 45 | (United States) First Coast Trucks | (United States) John Forbes (United States) Ken Fengler (United States) Bob Hundredmark (United States) Tom Curren | Chevrolet 6.0L V8 N/A | G | 315 |
| 35 DNF | GTP | 0 | (Germany) Jochen Dauer Racing | (United States) Al Unser Jr. (United States) Bobby Unser (United States) Robby Unser (United States) Al Unser | Porsche 962 | BF | 270 |
| 35 DNF | GTP | 0 | (Germany) Jochen Dauer Racing | (United States) Al Unser Jr. (United States) Bobby Unser (United States) Robby Unser (United States) Al Unser | Porsche 3.0L Flat 6 Twin-Turbo | BF | 270 |
| 36 DNF | GTO | 28 | (United States) Del Russo Taylor | (United States) Don Arpin (United States) Jon Olch (United States) Tim Banks (United States) Scott Watkins | Chevrolet Camaro | G | 234 |
| 36 DNF | GTO | 28 | (United States) Del Russo Taylor | (United States) Don Arpin (United States) Jon Olch (United States) Tim Banks (United States) Scott Watkins | Chevrolet 6.0L V8 N/A | G | 234 |
| 37 DNF | GTO | 53 | (United States) Hi-Tech Coating | (United States) Richard McDill (United States) Bill McDill (United States) Jim Burt | Chevrolet Camaro | G | 223 |
| 37 DNF | GTO | 53 | (United States) Hi-Tech Coating | (United States) Richard McDill (United States) Bill McDill (United States) Jim Burt | Chevrolet 6.0L V8 N/A | G | 223 |
| 38 DNF | GTU | 96 | (United States) Fastcolor Auto Art | (United States) Chuck Kurtz (United States) Bob Leitzinger (United States) David Loring (United States) Don Reynolds | Nissan 240SX | T | 192 |
| 38 DNF | GTU | 96 | (United States) Fastcolor Auto Art | (United States) Chuck Kurtz (United States) Bob Leitzinger (United States) David Loring (United States) Don Reynolds | Nissan 2.8L V6 N/A | T | 192 |
| 39 DNF | GTU | 57 | (United States) Kryder Racing | (United States) Henry Camferdam (United States) Phil Krueger (United States) Alistair Oag (United States) Reed Kryder | Nissan 240SX | G | 159 |
| 39 DNF | GTU | 57 | (United States) Kryder Racing | (United States) Henry Camferdam (United States) Phil Krueger (United States) Alistair Oag (United States) Reed Kryder | Nissan 2.8L V6 N/A | G | 159 |
| 40 | GTP | 60 | (United States) Gunnar Porsche | (United States) Jay Cochran (United Kingdom) Derek Bell (United Kingdom) Justin Bell | Gunnar 966 | BF | 83 |
| 40 | GTP | 60 | (United States) Gunnar Porsche | (United States) Jay Cochran (United Kingdom) Derek Bell (United Kingdom) Justin Bell | Porsche 3.0L Flat 6 Twin-Turbo | BF | 83 |
| 41 | GTO | 04 | (United States) Henry Brosnaham | (United States) Bobby Scolo (United States) Steve Burgner (United States) John Macaluso | Chevrolet Camaro | G | 78 |
| 41 | GTO | 04 | (United States) Henry Brosnaham | (United States) Bobby Scolo (United States) Steve Burgner (United States) John Macaluso | Chevrolet 6.0L V8 N/A | G | 78 |
| 42 DNF | GTP | 99 | (United States) All American Racers | (Argentina) Juan Manuel Fangio II (United States) Willy T. Ribbs (United Kingdom) Andy Wallace | Eagle HF89 | G | 60 |
| 42 DNF | GTP | 99 | (United States) All American Racers | (Argentina) Juan Manuel Fangio II (United States) Willy T. Ribbs (United Kingdom) Andy Wallace | Toyota 2.1L I4 Turbo | G | 60 |
| 43 DNF | GTO | 62 | (United States) Mazda Motorsports | (United States) John Morton (United Kingdom) Calvin Fish (United States) Pete Halsmer | Mazda RX-7 | G | 50 |
| 43 DNF | GTO | 62 | (United States) Mazda Motorsports | (United States) John Morton (United Kingdom) Calvin Fish (United States) Pete Halsmer | Mazda 13J-M 2.6L 4-Rotor | G | 50 |
| 44 DNF | LM | 1 | (United States) Nissan Performance Technology | (Netherlands) Arie Luyendyk (United Kingdom) Julian Bailey (Republic of Ireland) Derek Daly | Nissan R90CK | G | 47 |
| 44 DNF | LM | 1 | (United States) Nissan Performance Technology | (Netherlands) Arie Luyendyk (United Kingdom) Julian Bailey (Republic of Ireland) Derek Daly | Nissan 3.5L V8 Twin-Turbo | G | 47 |
| 45 DNF | GTO | 06 | (United States) Overbagh Motor Racing | (United States) Oma Kimbrough (United States) Hoyt Overbagh (United States) Mark Montgomery (United States) Kent Painter | Chevrolet Camaro | G | 37 |
| 45 DNF | GTO | 06 | (United States) Overbagh Motor Racing | (United States) Oma Kimbrough (United States) Hoyt Overbagh (United States) Mark Montgomery (United States) Kent Painter | Chevrolet 6.0L V8 N/A | G | 37 |
| 46 DNF | GTU | 95 | (United States) Fastcolor Auto Art | (United States) Butch Leitzinger (United States) David Loring (United States) Chuck Kurtz (United States) Bob Leitzinger | Nissan 240SX | T | 13 |
| 46 DNF | GTU | 95 | (United States) Fastcolor Auto Art | (United States) Butch Leitzinger (United States) David Loring (United States) Chuck Kurtz (United States) Bob Leitzinger | Nissan 2.8L V6 N/A | T | 13 |
| DNS | GTP | 3 | (United Kingdom) Bud Light Jaguar Racing | (Denmark) John Nielsen | Jaguar XJR-12 | G | - |
| DNS | GTP | 3 | (United Kingdom) Bud Light Jaguar Racing | (Denmark) John Nielsen | Jaguar 6.5L V12 N/A | G | - |
