= Kudzu DG-2 =

Sports prototype race car

- Category: IMSA GTP Lights
- Designer(s): Jim Downing
- Predecessor: Kudzu DG-1
- Successor: Kudzu DG-3

Technical specifications
- Chassis: Aluminum honeycomb monocoque covered in carbon fiber composite body
- Suspension: Double wishbones, pull-rod, coil springs over shock absorbers, anti-roll bar
- Engine: Buick 3.0 L (183.1 cu in) V6, naturally-aspirated, mid-engined
- Transmission: Hewland DGB 5-speed manual

Competition history
Entries	Podiums
89	1

The Kudzu DG-2 is an IMSA GTP Lights sports prototype race car, designed, developed and built by American racing driver Jim Downing, to compete in sports car racing, between 1992 and 1999. It debuted at the 1992 12 Hours of Sebring. Its best result was a third-place race finish, and it achieved ten class wins. It was powered by a naturally-aspirated 3.4 L (210 cu in) Buick V6 engine. Only 3 models were manufactured and produced.
