= Kudzu DG-3 =

Sports prototype race car

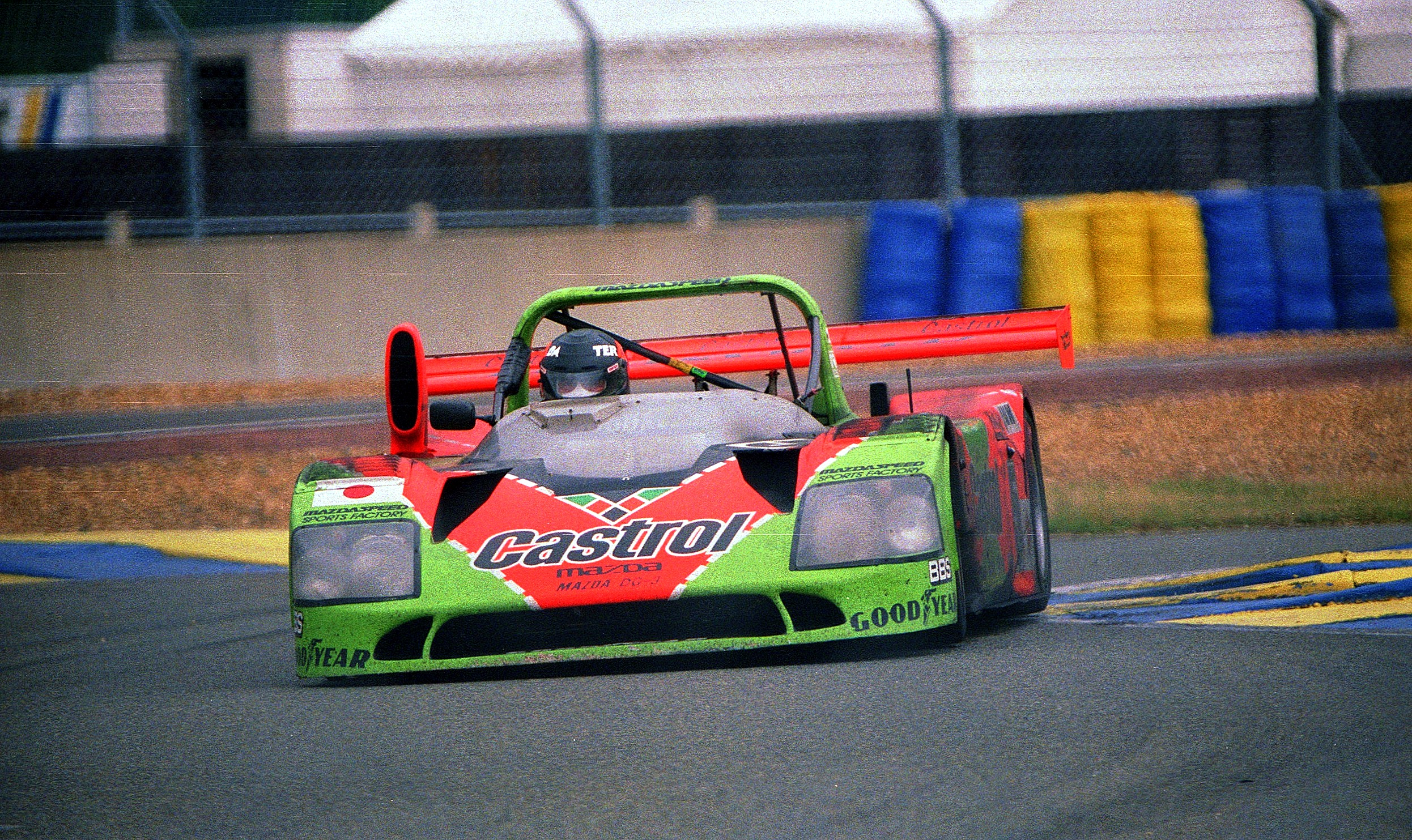
- Category: IMSA GTP Lights
- Designer: Jim Downing
- Predecessor: Kudzu DG-2

Technical specifications
- Chassis: Aluminum honeycomb monocoque covered in carbon fiber composite body
- Suspension: Double wishbones, pull-rod, coil springs over shock absorbers, anti-roll bar
- Engine: Mazda 13B/13G 3.0–4.2 L (183.1–256.3 cu in) Wankel 3-rotor/4-rotor, naturally-aspirated, mid-engined
- Transmission: 5-speed sequential

Competition history
Entries	Podiums	Poles
21	3	1

The Kudzu DG-3 is a sports prototype race car, designed, developed and built to World SportsCar (WSC) regulations, by American racing driver Jim Downing; which debuted at Road America in 1993. It competed in sports car racing between 1993 and 2000; achieving 3 podium finishes, and clinched 1 pole position. It was powered by a naturally-aspirated 3.0 L (180 cu in) Mazda 13G wankel 3-rotor, or later, a Mazda 13B wankel 4-rotor engine.

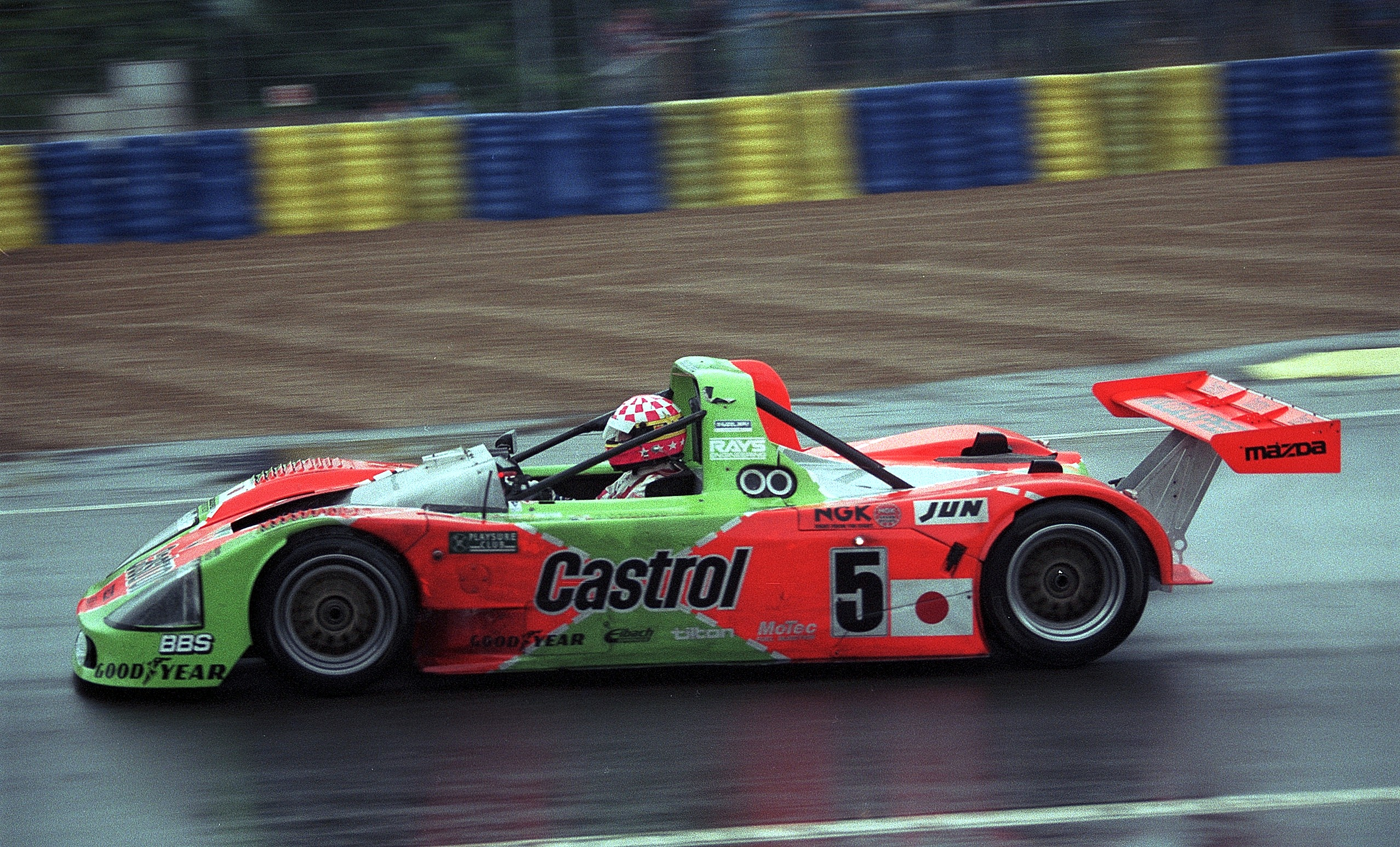
Kudzu DG-3 at Le Mans in 1995

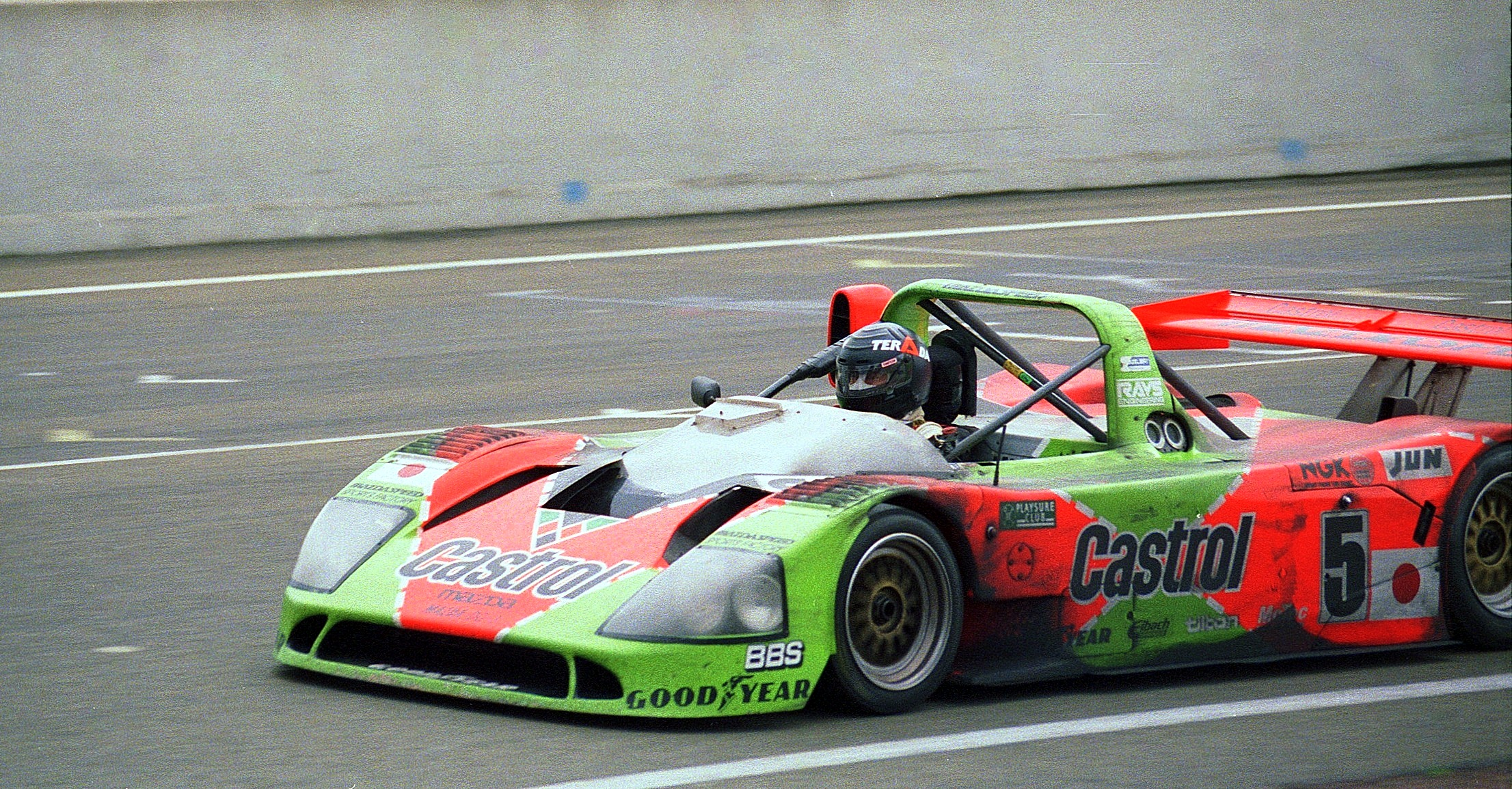
Kudzu DG-3 WSC #5 - Yojiro Terada, Jim Downing & Franck Freon on the pit straight at Le Mans 1995

== 24 Hours of Le Mans results ==
Year	Team	Drivers	Car #	Class	Laps	Pos.	Class Pos.
1995	(United States) Downing/Terada Racing (Japan) Mazdaspeed	(United States) Jim Downing (Japan) Yojiro Terada (France) Franck Fréon	5	WSC	282	7th	3rd
