= Yojiro Terada =

Japanese racing driver

- Nationality: (Japan) Japanese

24 Hours of Le Mans career
- Years: 1974, 1981–2008
- Teams: Mazda Automotive, Mazdaspeed, Lotus Sport, Team Artnature, T.D.R., Courage Compétition, Autoexe, Welter Racing, Binnie Motorsports, T2M Motorsport, Terramos
- Best finish: 7th (1995)
- Class wins: 4 (1983, 1988, 1990, 1996)

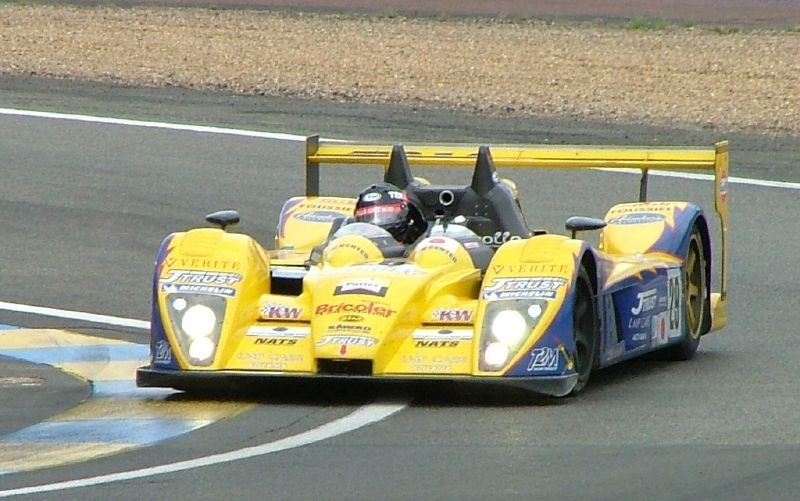
Yojiro Terada driving the T2M Motorsport Dome-Mader during the 2007 24 Hours of Le Mans.

Yojiro Terada (寺田陽次郎, Terada Yōjirō; born 26 March 1947) is a Japanese former racing driver from Kobe, Hyogo Prefecture.

== Racing career ==
Terada began his racing career in a Honda S600 in 1969, before he was taken on as Mazda's factory driver, a position he held through the 1990s including participating in the World Sportscar Championship and All Japan Sports Prototype Championship.

Terada also took class wins at the 24 Hours of Daytona on two occasions, including in the Mazda RX-7's debut race in 1979, scoring a GTU class win at fifth place overall. The other occasion was a fourth place overall finish and a GTO class win in 1982.

Terada is known for holding the record for the second most participations in the 24 Hours of Le Mans without an overall win (behind Bob Wollek), having run on 29 occasions (28 of which were consecutive) since 1974. He is also third behind Henri Pescarolo and Bob Wollek for the drivers with the most participations. He scored class victories at the event in 1983, 1988, 1990 and 1996, while his best overall finish was seventh in 1995.

== Business interests ==
When he is not racing, Terada runs the Tokyo-based AutoExe (オートエクゼ) tuning business, specialising in tuning parts and accessories for Mazda. and instructs on driving at NATS (Nihon Automobile High Technical School)

== Family ==
Terada is the father of voice actress Haruhi Nanao.

== 24 Hours of Le Mans results ==
| Year | Team | Co-Drivers | Car | Class | Laps | Pos. | Class Pos. |
|---|---|---|---|---|---|---|---|
| 1974 | (Japan) Mazda Automotive | (Japan) Yasuhiro Okamoto (Japan) Harukuni Takahashi | Sigma MC74-Mazda | S 3.0 | 155 | NC | NC |
| 1981 | (Japan) Mazdaspeed | (Japan) Hiroshi Fushida (United Kingdom) Win Percy | Mazda RX-7 253i | IMSA; GTO | 25 | DNF | DNF |
| 1982 | (Japan) Mazdaspeed | (Japan) Takashi Yorino (Australia) Allan Moffat | Mazda RX-7 254i | IMSA; GTX | 282 | 14th | 6th |
| 1983 | (Japan) Mazdaspeed | (Japan) Takashi Yorino (Japan) Yoshimi Katayama | Mazda 717C | C Jr. | 302 | 12th | 1st |
| 1984 | (Japan) Mazdaspeed | (Belgium) Pierre Dieudonné (Japan) Takashi Yorino | Mazda 727C | C2 | 261 | 20th | 6th |
| 1985 | (Japan) Mazdaspeed | (Japan) Yoshimi Katayama (Japan) Takashi Yorino | Mazda 737C | C2 | 264 | 24th | 6th |
| 1986 | (Japan) Mazdaspeed | (Japan) Yoshimi Katayama (Japan) Takashi Yorino | Mazda 757 | GTP | 59 | DNF | DNF |
| 1987 | (Japan) Mazdaspeed | (Japan) Yoshimi Katayama (Japan) Takashi Yorino | Mazda 757 | GTP | 34 | DNF | DNF |
| 1988 | (Japan) Mazdaspeed | (Republic of Ireland) David Kennedy (Belgium) Pierre Dieudonné | Mazda 757 | GTP | 337 | 15th | 1st |
| 1989 | (Japan) Mazdaspeed | (Belgium) Marc Duez (Germany) Volker Weidler | Mazda 767 | GTP | 339 | 12th | 3rd |
| 1990 | (Japan) Mazdaspeed | (Japan) Yoshimi Katayama (Japan) Takashi Yorino | Mazda 767B | GTP | 304 | 20th | 1st |
| 1991 | (Japan) Mazdaspeed (France) Oreca | (Belgium) Pierre Dieudonné (Japan) Takashi Yorino | Mazda 787 | C2 | 346 | 8th | 8th |
| 1992 | (Japan) Mazdaspeed (France) Oreca | (Brazil) Maurizio Sandro Sala (Japan) Takashi Yorino | Mazda MXR-01 | C1 | 124 | DNF | DNF |
| 1993 | (United Kingdom) Lotus Sport (United Kingdom) Chamberlain Engineering | (United Kingdom) Peter Hardman (Denmark) Thorkild Thyrring | Lotus Esprit S300 | GT | 92 | DNF | DNF |
| 1994 | (Japan) Team Artnature | (France) Franck Fréon (France) Pierre de Thoisy | Mazda RX-7 | IMSA; GTS | 250 | 15th | 2nd |
| 1995 | (United States) D.T.R. (Japan) Mazdaspeed | (United States) Jim Downing (France) Franck Fréon | Kudzu DG-3-Mazda | WSC | 282 | 7th | 3rd |
| 1996 | (Japan) Mazdaspeed | (United States) Jim Downing (France) Franck Fréon | Kudzu DLM-Mazda | LMP2 | 251 | 25th | 1st |
| 1997 | (United States) Team D.T.R (Japan) Mazdaspeed | (United States) Jim Downing (France) Franck Fréon | Kudzu DLM-4-Mazda | LMP | 263 | 17th | 6th |
| 1998 | (France) Courage Compétition | (France) Franck Fréon (France) Olivier Thévenin | Courage C36-Porsche | LMP1 | 300 | 16th | 5th |
| 1999 | (Japan) Autoexe Motorsport | (France) Franck Fréon (United Kingdom) Robin Donovan | Autoexe LMP99-Ford | LMP | 74 | DNF | DNF |
| 2000 | (France) Rachel Welter | (France) Richard Balandras (France) Sylvain Boulay | WR LMP-Peugeot | LMP675 | 266 | 26th | 2nd |
| 2001 | (France) Gerard Welter | (France) Stéphane Daoudi (France) Jean-René de Fournoux | WR LMP01-Peugeot | LMP675 | 245 | 19th | 2nd |
| 2002 | (Japan) Autoexe Motorsport | (United States) John Fergus (United States) Jim Downing | Autoexe (WR) LMP-02-Mazda | LMP675 | 5 | DNF | DNF |
| 2003 | (France) Rachel Welter | (France) Olivier Porta (United Kingdom) Gavin Pickering | WR LMP01-Peugeot | LMP675 | 235 | NC | NC |
| 2004 | (France) Rachel Welter | (France) Patrice Roussel (France) Olivier Porta | WR LM2001-Peugeot | LMP2 | 270 | 26th | 2nd |
| 2005 | (France) Rachel Welter | (France) Patrice Roussel (United States) William Binnie | WR LMP04-Peugeot | LMP2 | 233 | NC | NC |
| 2006 | (United States) Binnie Motorsports | (United States) William Binnie (United Kingdom) Allen Timpany | Lola B05/42-Zytek | LMP2 | 326 | 13th | 2nd |
| 2007 | (Japan) T2M Motorsport | (France) Robin Longechal (Japan) Yutaka Yamagishi | Dome S101.5-Mader | LMP2 | 56 | DNF | DNF |
| 2008 | (Japan) Terramos | (Japan) Hiroki Katoh (Japan) Kazuho Takahashi | Courage LC70-Mugen | LMP1 | 224 | NC | NC |
