= Jim Downing =

American racing driver

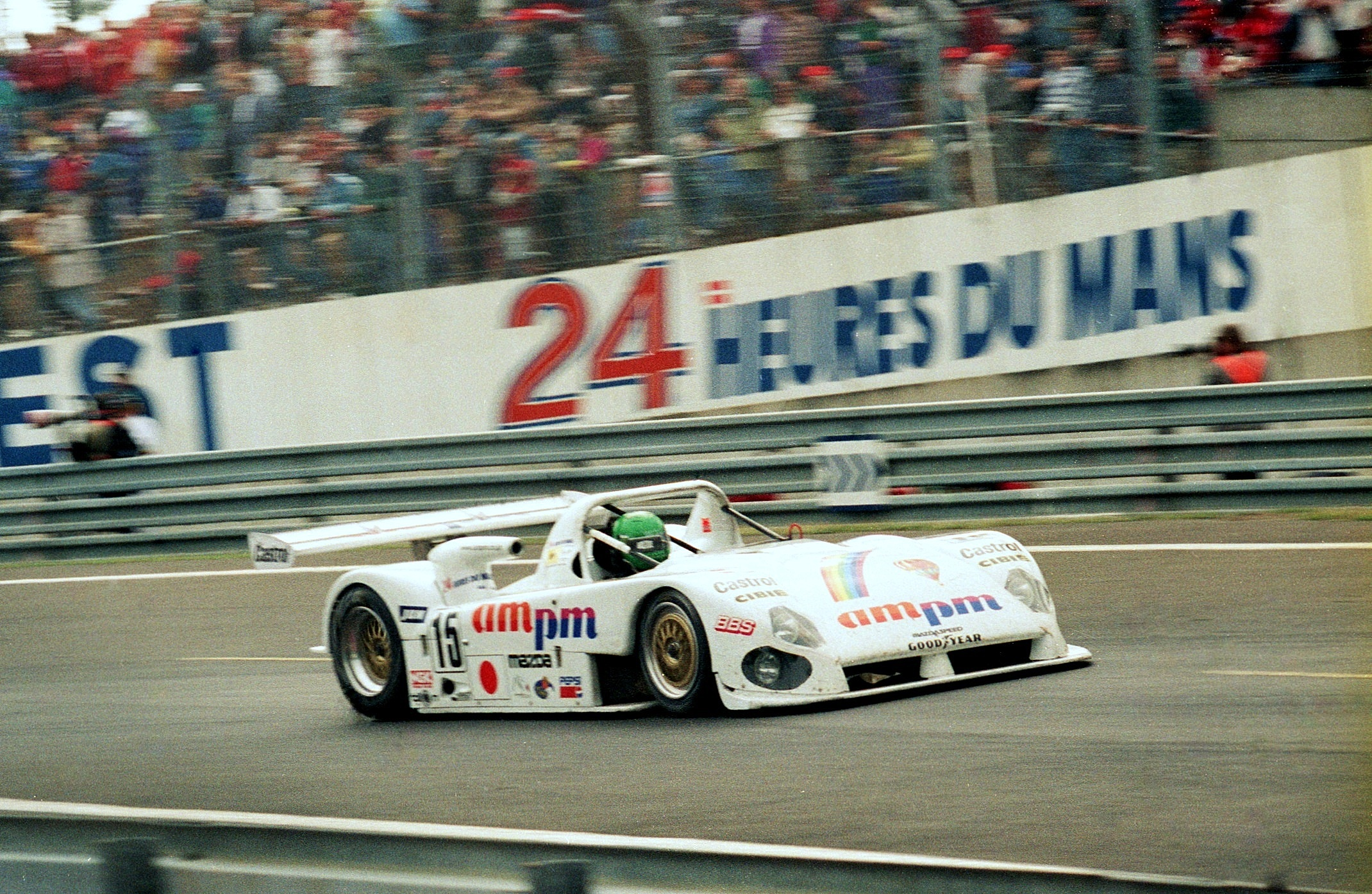
Downing at the 1997 24 Hours of Le Mans in a Kudzu DLM-4.

James Downing (born January 4, 1942) is an American former professional race car driver. He is a five-time IMSA Championship winner, owner/driver of Downing/Atlanta Racing, and was principal in the development of the HANS device.

== Personal life ==
Downing was born in Atlanta, Georgia, and graduated Georgia Tech with a degree in industrial management. He married public relations specialist Connie Goudinoff in 1989. He is a member of the Phi Gamma Delta fraternity.

== Racing ==
Downing's father was a major foreign car dealer in the Atlanta area, he grew up around cars and racing. He began racing soapbox derbies when he was 11, raced those for several years, then won a local downhill slalom event when he was 16. In his late teens and early twenties, he raced gymkhanas (known today as SCCA Solo) in almost anything he could get his hands on because SCCA rules of the time prohibited racing before age 21.

After several years racing in various categories of the SCCA, Downing joined IMSA in 1974, at the invitation of John Bishop, President, and founder of the then new International Motor Sports Association (IMSA).

Sponsored by the Mazda factory for his entire IMSA career, Downing progressed up the competition ladder from the near showroom stock Radial Sedan series Mazda RX-2 & Mazda RX-3, to GTU Mazda RX-3 & Mazda RX-7 and GTO in the Mazda RX-7, then up to GTP category prototypes, all powered by two, three, and four-rotor versions of the Mazda Wankel engine. After competing in an Argo-built prototype, in 1988, he began designing and building a prototype racer of his own design, with the Kudzu DG-1 being his first.

In 1999, with the demise/reorganization of the IMSA series, Downing moved on to the American Le Mans Series with his Kudzu racers until the end of the 2000 racing season, then into an AutoExe Motorsports prototype as his long and successful career wound down.

== HANS Device ==
Downing has been credited as the first to identify the problems associated with a restrained torso and an unrestrained head in sudden deceleration impacts, following the 1981 death of Patrick Jacquemart at the Mid-Ohio Sports Car Course during the Red Roof Inns 200 in May 1981. Jacquemart, the director of Renault Racing in the United States, struck a sandbank with the front of the car and suffered a fatal basilar skull fracture.

With the problem identified, Downing turned to his brother-in-law, Dr. Robert Hubbard, a bio mechanical crash engineer for General Motors, to help him design a product that would eliminate or protect against these types of injuries. Working together, Dr. Hubbard created the first prototypes of the HANS Device in the late 1980s, and Downing, as a firm believer of the product he had helped to create, started wearing the untested prototype of the HANS Device during his IMSA sports car races.

== Racing record ==
=== SCCA National Championship Runoffs ===
Year	Track	Car	Engine	Class	Finish	Start	Status
1964	Riverside	Formcar	Volkswagen	Formula Vee	10		Running
1971	Road Atlanta	Ford Mustang	Ford	American Sedan	5	11	Running
1972	Road Atlanta	Ford Mustang	Ford	American Sedan	10	14	Running
2005	Mid-Ohio	Ralt RT41	Toyota	C Sports Racer	4	10	Running
2006	Heartland Park	Ralt RT41	Toyota	C Sports Racer	5	7	Running
2007	Heartland Park	Ralt RT40	Toyota	C Sports Racer		8	DNS
2008	Heartland Park	Peach Day 01	Mazda	C Sports Racer	3	3	Running
2009	Road America	Peach Day 01	Mazda	C Sports Racer	5	7	Running
2010	Road America	Peach Day 01	Mazda	C Sports Racer	8	8	Running
2011	Road America	Peach Day 02	Mazda	C Sports Racer	3	7	Running

=== Complete 24 Hours of Le Mans results ===
Year	Team	Co-Drivers	Car	Class	Laps	Pos.	Class Pos.
1995	(United States) D.T.R. (Japan) Mazdaspeed	(Japan) Yojiro Terada (France) Franck Fréon	Kudzu DG-3-Mazda	WSC	282	7th	3rd
1996	(Japan) Mazdaspeed	(Japan) Yojiro Terada (France) Franck Fréon	Kudzu DLM-Mazda	LMP2	251	25th	1st
1997	(United States) Team D.T.R (Japan) Mazdaspeed	(Japan) Yojiro Terada (France) Franck Fréon	Kudzu DLM-4-Mazda	LMP	263	17th	6th
2002	(Japan) Autoexe Motorsport	(Japan) Yojiro Terada (United States) John Fergus	Autoexe (WR) LMP-02-Mazda	LMP675	5	DNF	DNF

=== Notable Motorsports Awards ===
- 2002 Phil Hill Award
- 2008 Bob Akin Memorial Motorsports Award
- 2012 Sebring Hall of Fame Inductee
- 2014 SCCA Hall of Fame Inductee
- 2024 Motorsports Hall of Fame of America Inductee
