= Yoshimi Katayama =

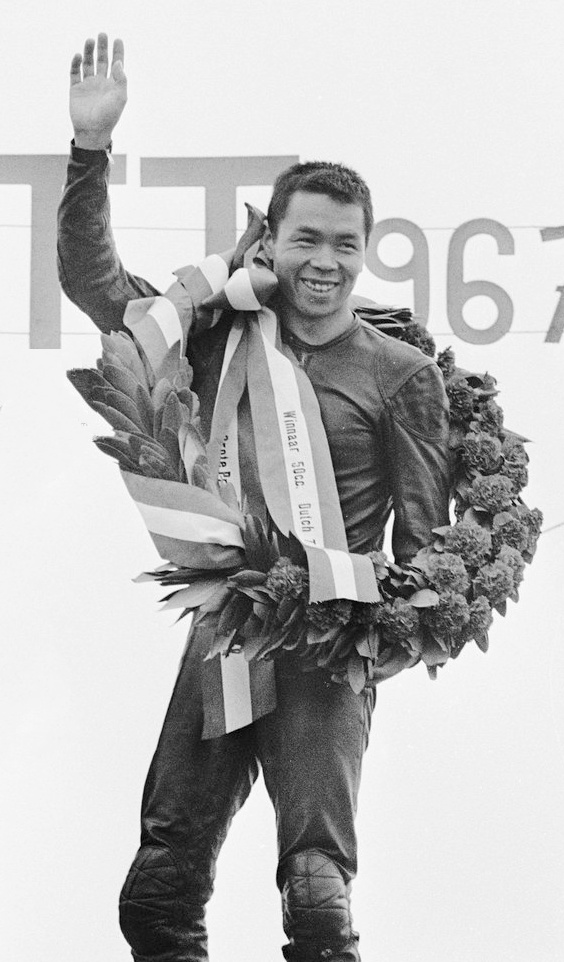
- Katayama at the TT at the Dutch TT (24 June 1967)
- Nationality: Japanese
- Born: 15 May 1940; Hyogo Prefecture, Japan
- Died: 26 March 2016 (aged 75); Japan
Motorcycle racing career statistics
Grand Prix motorcycle racing
Active years	1964 – 1967
First race	1964 125cc Japanese Grand Prix
Last race	1967 50cc Belgian Grand Prix
First win	1966 50cc Japanese Grand Prix
Last win	1967 50cc Dutch TT
Team	Suzuki
Starts / Wins / Podiums / Poles / F. laps / Points; 17 / 4 / 12 / 0 / 6 / 87

Yoshimi Katayama (Japanese: 片山 義美, Hepburn: Katayama Yoshimi; May 15, 1940 – March 26, 2016) was a Japanese professional Grand Prix motorcycle road racer and auto racer.

== Motorsports career ==
Born in the Hyōgo Prefecture, Katayama began his Grand Prix career in 1964 with Suzuki. He enjoyed his best season in 1967 when he won two races, including the French Grand Prix held at the challenging Circuit de Charade. He finished the season in second place behind his Suzuki teammate, Hans-Georg Anscheidt in the 50cc world championship. He also finished the 1967 season in fourth place in the 125cc championship. Katayama won four Grand Prix races in his career.

Katayama would later switch to cars, competing in domestic series mainly as Mazda's factory driver until he retired at the end of 1990. He finished second in the 1983 James Hardie 1000, held at the Mount Panorama Circuit in Bathurst, Australia co-driving with four-time winner Allan Moffat in a factory supported Mazda RX-7. His previous visits to the race were in 1977 when he spectacularly rolled his Mazda RX-3 at Murray's Corner on lap 103, and 1982 where he finished in sixth place again partnering Moffat.

In 1990, Katayama placed 20th overall and won the GTP class in the 1990 24 Hours of Le Mans driving a Mazda 767.

Katayama passed away on 26 March 2016 after a short illness, he was 75 years old.

== Career Results ==
=== Motorcycle Grand Prix results ===
Year	Class	Team	1	2	3	4	5	6	7	8	9	10	11	12	13	Points	Rank	Wins
1964	125cc	Suzuki	USA	ESP	FRA	IOM	NED		FRG	DDR	ULS	FIN	NAT	JPN; 3		4	11th	0
1965	125cc	Suzuki	USA	FRG	ESP	FRA	IOM	NED; 2		DDR	CZE	ULS	FIN	NAT	JPN	6	11th	0
1965	250cc	Suzuki	USA	FRG	ESP	FRA	IOM	NED; 4	BEL; 4	DDR	CZE	ULS	FIN	NAT	JPN	6	14th	0
1966	50cc	Suzuki	ESP	FRG		NED; 5						IOM	NAT	JPN; 1		10	5th	1
1966	125cc	Suzuki	ESP	FRG		NED		DDR; 2	CZE	FIN; 5	ULS	IOM	NAT	JPN; 2		14	6th	0
1967	50cc	Suzuki	ESP; 2	FRG	FRA; 1	IOM	NED; 1	BEL; 2								28	2nd	2
1967	125cc	Suzuki	ESP; 3	FRG; 1	FRA; 3	IOM	NED; 4		DDR	CZE	FIN	ULS	NAT	CAN	JPN	19	4th	1

=== Complete Bathurst 1000 results ===
Year	Team	Co-Drivers	Car	Class	Laps	Pos.	Class Pos.
1977	(Australia) Craven Mild Racing	(Australia) Geoff Leeds	Mazda RX-3	2001cc – 3000cc	103	DNF	DNF
1982	(Australia) Peter Stuyvesant International Racing	(Canada) Allan Moffat	Mazda RX-7	A	156	6th	6th
1983	(Australia) Peter Stuyvesant International	(Canada) Allan Moffat	Mazda RX-7	A	162	2nd	2nd

=== 24 Hours of Le Mans results ===
Year	Team	Co-Drivers	Car	Class	Laps	Pos.	Class Pos.
1983	(Japan) Mazdaspeed Co. Ltd.	(Japan) Yojiro Terada (Japan) Takashi Yorino	Mazda 717C	C Jr.	302	12th	1st
1984	(United States) B. F. Goodrich Company	(United States) John Morton (United States) John O'Steen	Lola T616-Mazda	C2	320	10th	1st
1985	(Japan) Mazdaspeed Co. Ltd.	(Japan) Yojiro Terada (Japan) Takashi Yorino	Mazda 737C	C2	264	24th	6th
1986	(Japan) Mazdaspeed Co. Ltd.	(Japan) Yojiro Terada (Japan) Takashi Yorino	Mazda 757	GTP	59	DNF	DNF
1987	(Japan) Mazdaspeed Co. Ltd.	(Japan) Yojiro Terada (Japan) Takashi Yorino	Mazda 757	GTP	34	DNF	DNF
1988	(Japan) Mazdaspeed Co. Ltd.	(Belgium) Marc Duez (United Kingdom) David Leslie	Mazda 767	GTP	330	17th	2nd
1990	(Japan) Mazdaspeed Co. Ltd.	(Japan) Yojiro Terada (Japan) Takashi Yorino	Mazda 767B	GTP	304	20th	1st
