= Tiga GT286 =

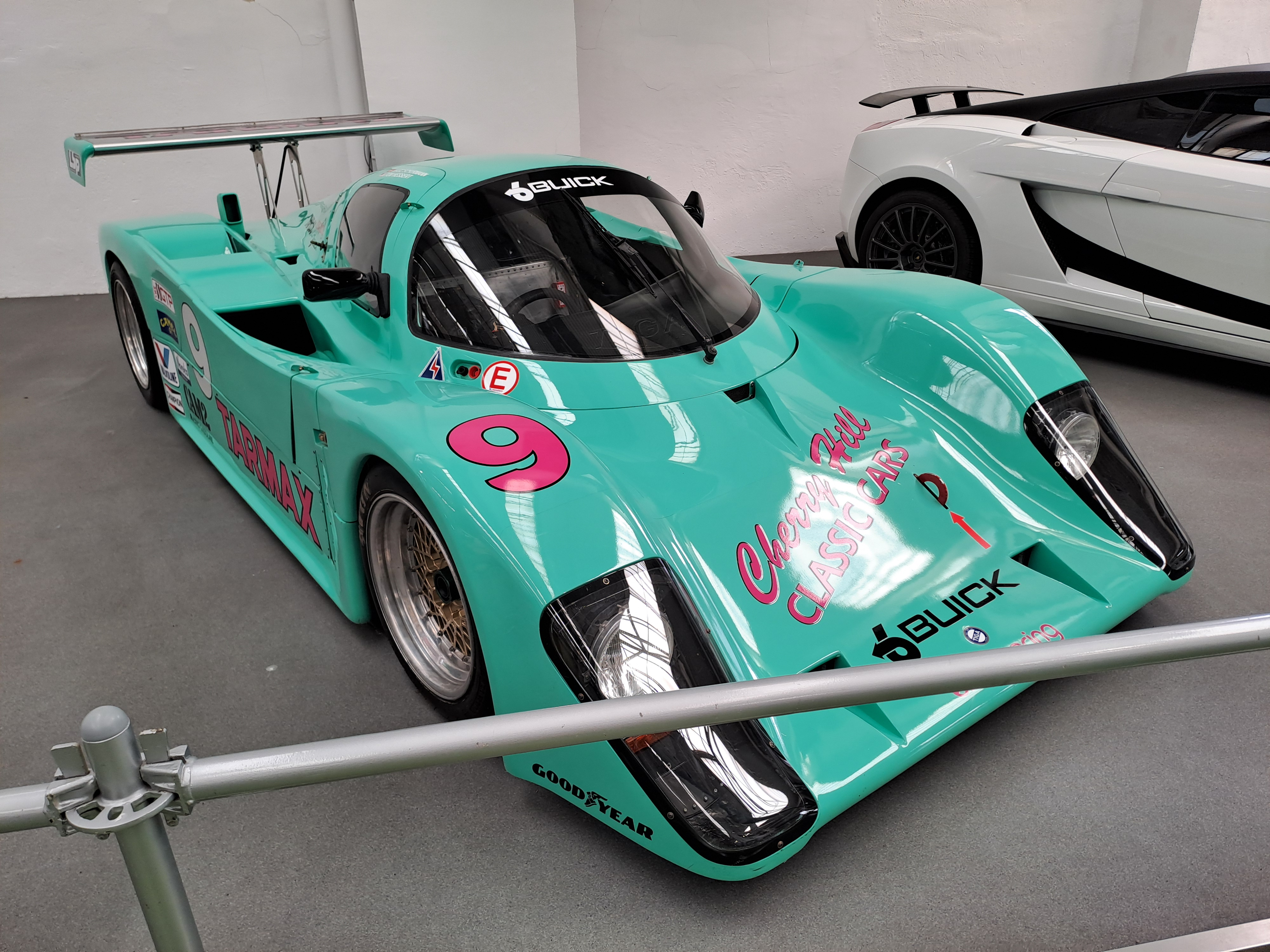
- Category: Group C2; IMSA GTP Lights
- Designer: Andy Scriven

Technical specifications
- Chassis: Aluminum honeycomb monocoque, carbon-fiber composite/kevlar body
- Suspension: Double wishbones, pull-rod actuated coil springs and shock absorbers, anti-roll bar (front); Lower wishbones, top rockers actuating in-board mounted coil springs over shock absorbers, anti-roll bar (rear)
- Length: 4,410 mm (174 in)
- Width: 1,790 mm (70 in)
- Height: 1,000 mm (39 in)
- Axle track: 1,480 mm (58 in) (front); 1,626 mm (64.0 in) (rear)
- Wheelbase: 2,550 mm (100 in)
- Engine: Mazda 13B 1.3 L (79.3 cu in) 2-rotor wankel mid-engined
- Transmission: Hewland 5-speed manual
- Power: ~ 310 hp (230 kW)
- Weight: 800 kg (1,800 lb)
- Tires: Bridgestone; Goodyear

Competition history
- Debut: 1986 24 Hours of Daytona

The Tiga GT286 is a sports prototype race car, designed, developed, and built by British manufacturer Tiga, for sports car racing, conforming to Group C2 and IMSA GTP Lights rules and regulations, in 1986, and continued competing until 1993.
