= Kudzu DG-1 =

IMSA GTP Lights sports prototype race car

- Category: IMSA GTP Lights
- Designer: Jim Downing
- Successor: Kudzu DG-2

Technical specifications
- Chassis: Aluminum honeycomb monocoque covered in carbon fiber composite body
- Suspension: Double wishbones, pull-rod, coil springs over shock absorbers, anti-roll bar
- Engine: Mazda/Buick 1.3–3.0 L (79.3–183.1 cu in) 2-rotor/V6, naturally-aspirated, mid-engined
- Transmission: Hewland DGB 5-speed manual

Competition history

The Kudzu DG-1 is an IMSA GTP Lights sports prototype race car, designed, developed and built by American racing driver Jim Downing; making its debut in 1989. It competed in the IMSA GT Championship between 1989 and 1993. It was powered by either a Mazda 13B Wankel rotary engine, or a Buick V6 engine. Its best result was a 5th-place finish, and it achieved 4 class wins.
