= Toyota 87C =

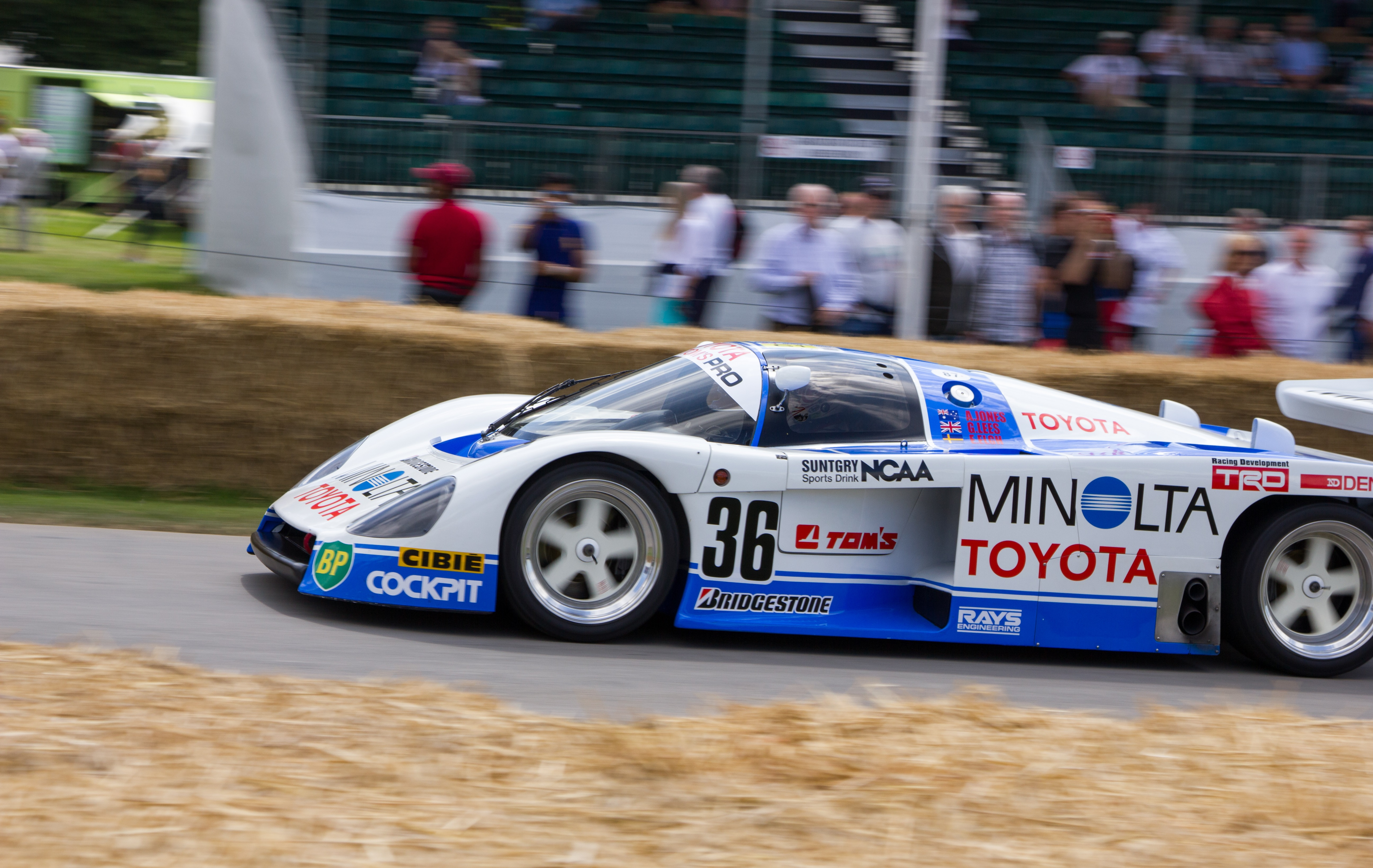
Toyota 87C at Goodwood in 2014

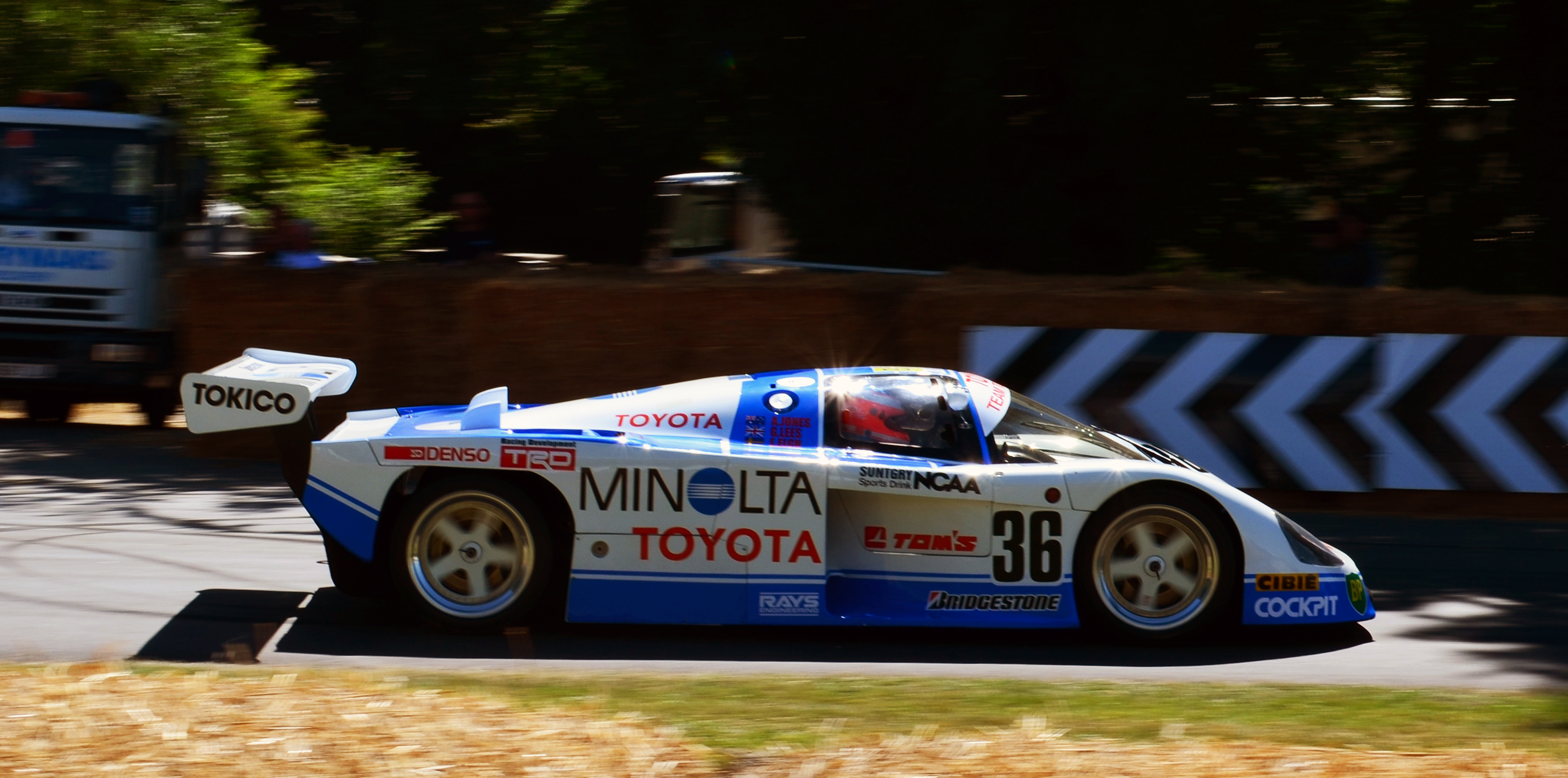
Toyota 87C at Goodwood 2014 001

The Toyota 87C, also known as the TOM'S 87C, was a Group C prototype sports car, designed, developed and built by Toyota, for use in sports car racing, specifically the World Sportscar Championship, between 1987 and 1988.

== Development history and technology ==
In the winter of 1986/1987, those responsible for motorsport at Toyota decided to step up their commitment to the sports car world championship. First and foremost, this meant more money for the development and use of racing cars. With the start of Group C in 1982, Toyota got involved in sports car racing. However, the vehicles have not yet been built or used by Toyota. The development and construction of the racing cars were in the hands of the technicians at Dome, a company founded in 1978 by Minoru Hayashi that specialized in building racing cars. For example, the previous model of the 87C was officially called the Dome 86C.

TOM'S Co. Ltd. took over the races. - Tachi Iowa Motor Sport - is named after the two founders Nobuhide Tachi and Kiyoshi Iowa. The racing team, founded in 1974, took care of the logistics of the operations, while Toyota was partly responsible for operational planning. This variant of team leadership is not uncommon among manufacturers in sports car racing. The connection between Audi and Joest Racing may serve as an example from the present.

The main innovation in technology was the engine. The previous 4-cylinder 4T GT engine, which was based on mass production, was retired. The new 2.1-liter 4-cylinder turbocharged engine was given a completely new engine management system and delivered 620 hp (460 kW). After the first test drives, the wall thickness of the engine block was increased, which made the unit heavier but also more durable.

The racing car designer Masahiro Ohkuni moved from Dome to the group and developed three aluminum chassis together with Dome technicians. The cars looked very successful and compact. However, the 87C lacked sufficient downforce from the start; the main reason why the cars were too slow on the fast Le Mans circuit. In 1987 Toyota was almost exclusively interested in the 24 Hours of Le Mans, where overall victory has been the big goal since entering sports car racing. However, this focus on one race was a certain developmental disadvantage compared to the competition. Although the vehicles were registered for a few races before Le Mans, the car and the team were missing racing kilometers, which also served to eliminate weaknesses in aerodynamics and tuning.

Two chassis were used by TOM'S; Chassis 001 was taken over by Dome and entered there as Dome 87C for a total of six races.

== Racing history ==
The 87C made its racing debut at the Suzuka 500 km race. The race was the first race event of the All Japan Sports Prototype Championship that year. No compromises were made with the drivers and the cockpits were entrusted to experienced pilots. In the 87C with starting #36 sat the Formula One World Champion of the 1980 Formula One season, the Australian Alan Jones, who was able to sign up after a failed Formula 1 comeback. His partner was veteran long-distance pilot Geoff Lees. After finishing fifth in practice, the duo finished third overall, on the same lap as the winners Hideki Okada and Mike Thackwell in a Porsche 962C and another Porsche driven by Kunimitsu Takahashi and Kenny Acheson. In the second race, the Japanese championship round in Fuji, there was a surprising overall victory for Jones, Lees, and Masanori Sekiya.

After a sobering Le Mans test weekend in May 1987, where the fastest car, Raul Boesel's Jaguar XJR-8, missed a lap by almost 10 seconds, the TOM'S racing team came to the actual race in June with two cars. The car with the number 37 was driven by the two Japanese Masanori Sekiya and Kaoru Hoshino and the Englishman Tiff Needell. Alan Jones, Geoff Lees, and Dome works driver Eje Elghthe prototype with the number 36. The operation turned into a disaster. Alan Jones was left on the track after 19 laps without fuel because the team miscalculated the amount of fuel after the second pit stop. The sister car drove only twenty laps longer, then the drive ended with an engine failure.

The racing type was far more successful in the Japanese sports car championship than in Le Mans. Lees, Sekiya and Hitoshi Ogawa won the Suzuka 1000 km. The 87C was last used at the factory in the 1000 km race at Fuji, the last race of the sports car world championship in 1987.

At the end of the year a chassis was sold to a private team and introduced as the new works car, the 88C.
