= Mazda 757 =

Prototype racing car

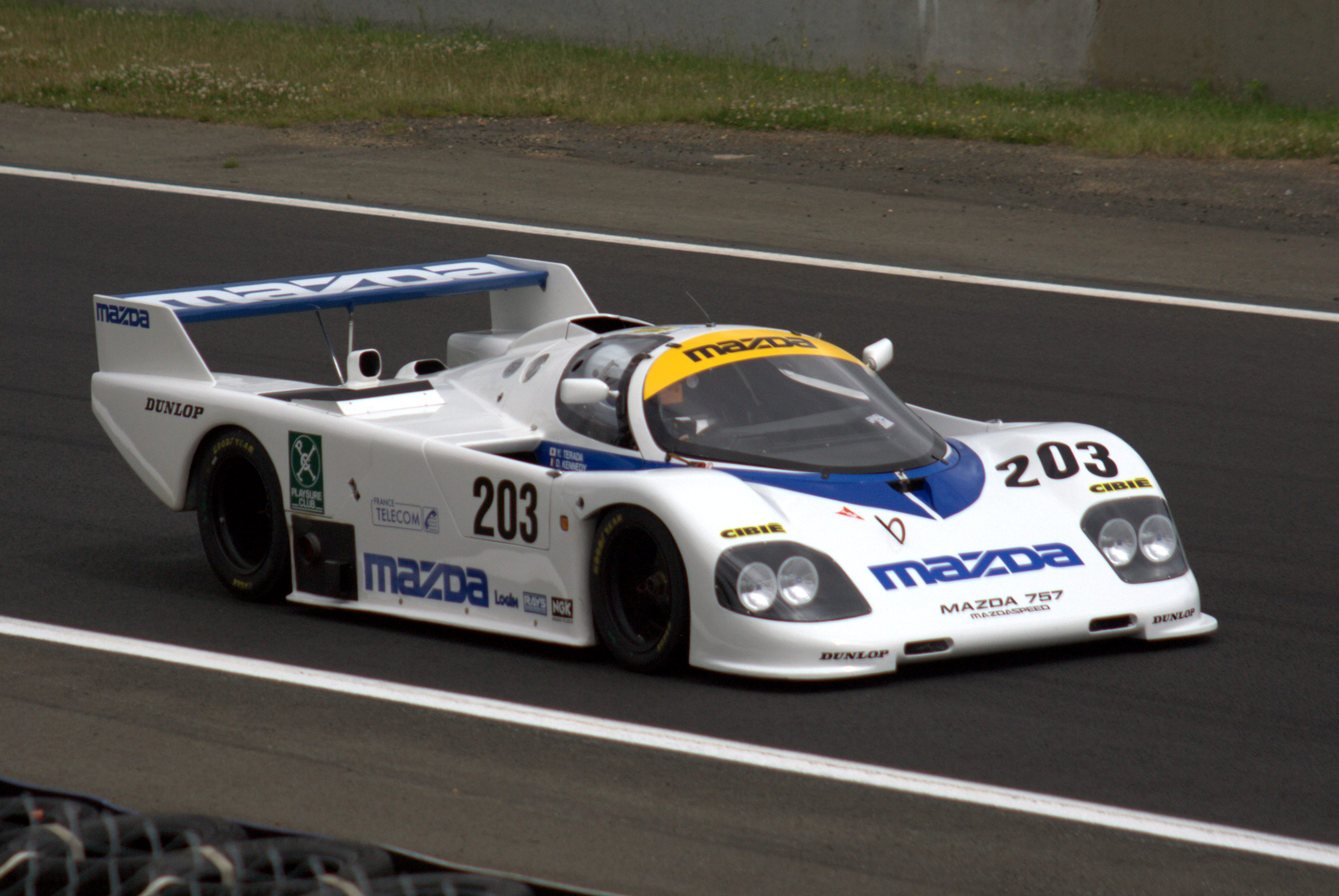
Mazda 757

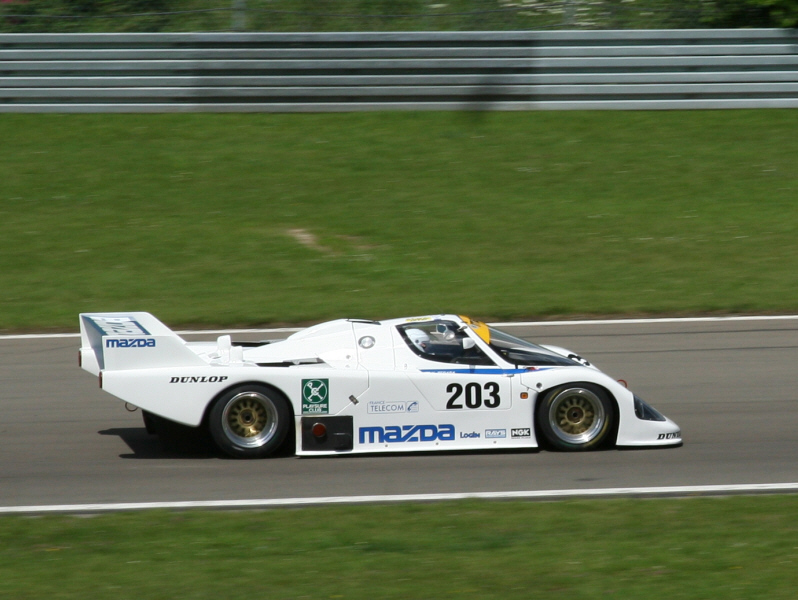
Mazda 757 at the DAMC 05 Oldtimer Festival Nürburgring.

The Mazda 757 is a prototype racing car built by Mazdaspeed for the 24 Hours of Le Mans running under the IMSA-spec GTP class. It replaced the previous lineage of Group C2 class cars which ended with the 737C and was the first chassis built entirely by Mazdaspeed and designed by Nigel Stroud. The 747 designation was skipped to avoid confusion with the second generation Mazda RX-7, which was developed under the codename P747. The 757 used a new 3-rotor 13G Wankel engine.

Two 757s entered the 1986 24 Hours of Le Mans, but both failed to finish the race due to gearbox problems, marking the first time Mazdaspeed had failed to finish at Le Mans. In the All Japan Sports Prototype Championship season, Mazda was able to come home 3rd in the manufacturer's championship. For 1987, two 757s were again entered, with one finishing 7th overall while the other suffered engine failure. Along with a good result at the joint World Sportscar Championship and All Japan Sports Prototype Championship event at Fuji, Mazdaspeed was able to achieve 10th in the teams championship for WSC and 3rd in the manufacturer's championship for JSPC. A lone 757 was brought out again for 1988 alongside two newer 767s and was able to beat both 767s to place 15th overall.
