= Mazda 737C =

Prototype racing car for Mazdaspeed

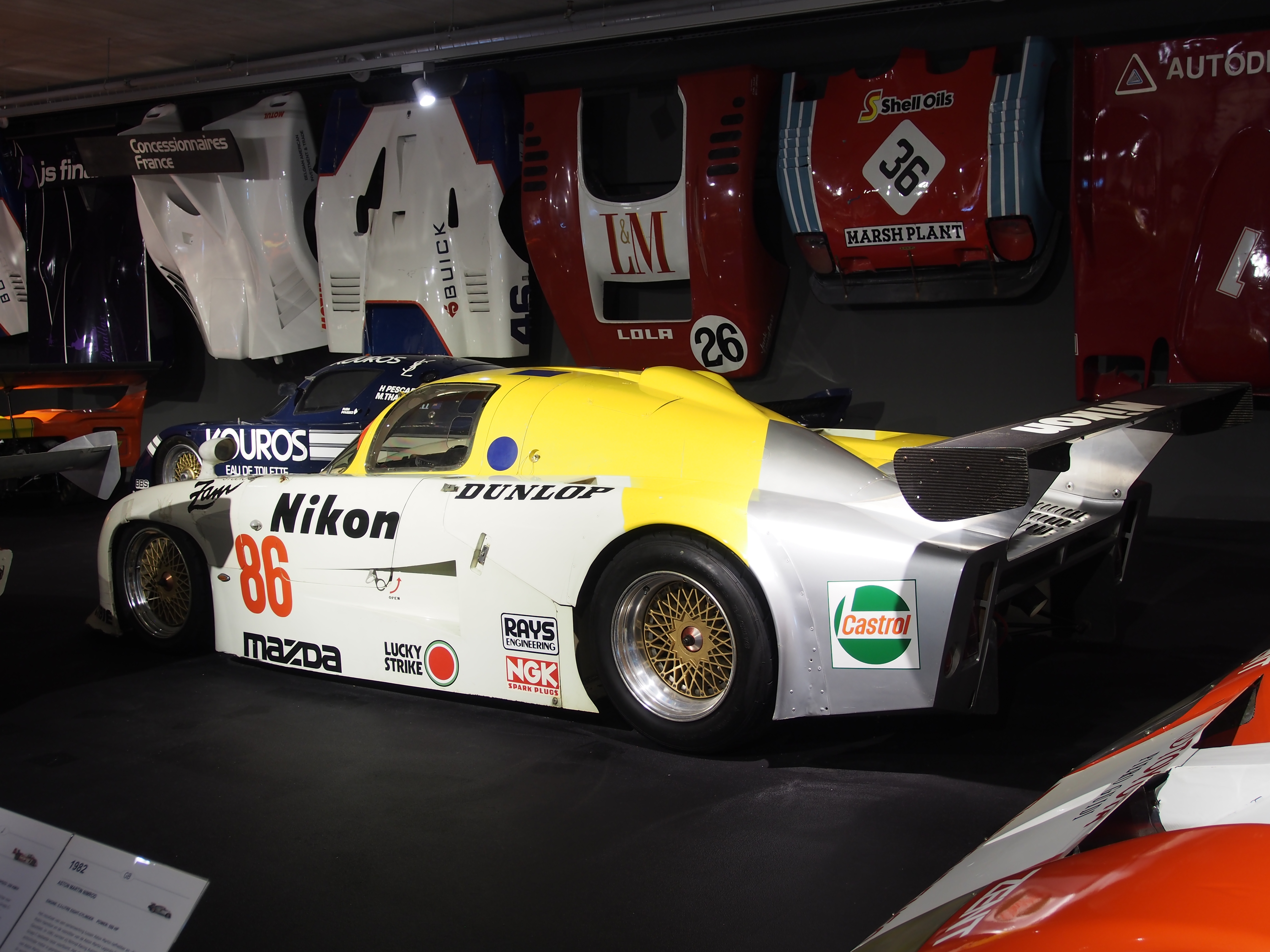
737C rear end

The Mazda 737C is a prototype racing car that was built for Mazdaspeed for the 24 Hours of Le Mans under the Group C2 formula. It was the final evolution of the initial Mooncraft built design dating back to the 717C. It again used a 2-rotor 13B Wankel engine.

Two 737Cs were entered in the 1985 24 Hours of Le Mans, finishing 3rd and 6th in the C2 class. The 737Cs were also raced in part of the 1985 World Sportscar Championship season, managing 8th place for Mazdaspeed in the C2 teams championship. In the All Japan Sports Prototype Championship, Mazda was able to come home 5th in the constructor's championship.

737Cs later ended up in the hands of privateers for the JSPC after Mazda replaced them with the newer 757.
