= Mazdaspeed =

Auto racing team

Mazdaspeed Co., Ltd
- Type: Subsidiary
- Industry: Automotive engineering; Motorsport
- Founded: 1967
- Successor: Mazda Spirit Racing
- Headquarters: Hiroshima, Japan
- Area served: Worldwide
- Products: Automobile
- Parent: Mazda

Mazdaspeed (マツダスピード, Matsudasupīdo) (often stylized in all-caps as MAZDASPEED) was Mazda's in-house performance division. The company was a grassroots racing team in Japan. Owned by Mazda Motor Corporation, they built production model vehicles, became involved in motorsports development, and offered performance parts and accessories. Mazda has phased out Mazdaspeed branding and has not offered a Mazdaspeed trim since the 2013 Mazdaspeed3.

== History ==
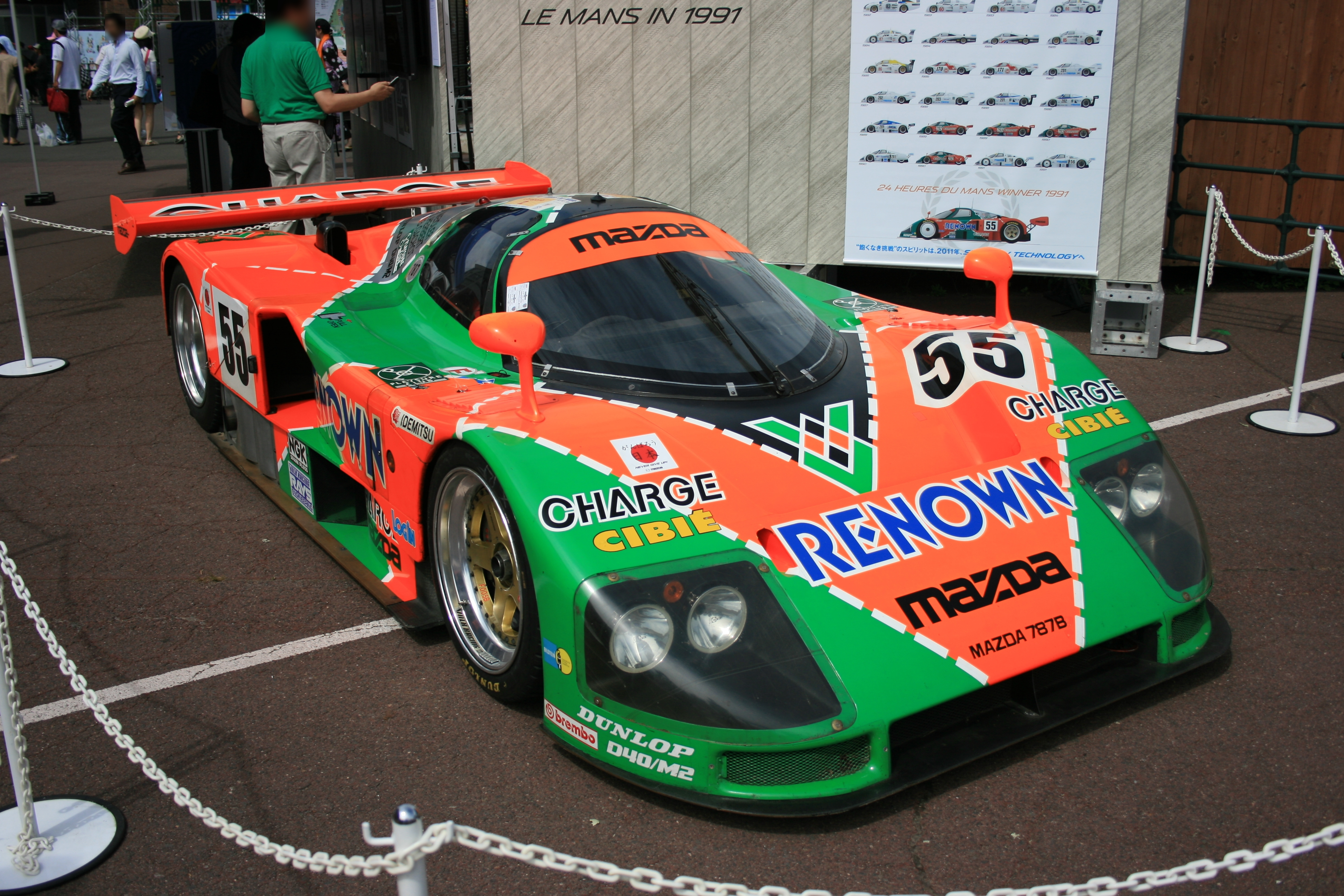
The Mazda 787B, winner of the 1991 24 Hours of Le Mans.

Mazdaspeed began in 1967 as "Mazda Sports Corner", an independent racing team and tuning operation run by Takayoshi Ohashi, who also ran Mazda's Tokyo distributor. They competed in numerous events at home and abroad, and they were also competitive at the 24 Hours of Le Mans races in the early 1980s, with the 717, 727, and 737. Mazda brought the racing team to Hiroshima in 1983, where the name became Mazdaspeed. In 1991 Mazdaspeed's 787B won at Le Mans, a feat no other Japanese team managed until Toyota did in 2018. Mazdaspeed also prepared the Lantis & Familia for the JTCC between 1994 and 1996.

Outside of racing, Mazdaspeed produced numerous factory approved performance products for the MX5 (NA/NB), RX7 FC/FD), 626/Capella, Familia/323/Lantis, MX3/Presso, MX6, AZ1, Carol. Most notable are the limited-production touring kits (A-Spec, B-Spec, C-Spec, etc). Each of these kits offered a different exterior appearance and different performance parts.

Mazda Motor Corporation assumed control of Mazdaspeed in 1999 as a tuning and performance parts operation within the company. It began offering performance-based versions of its vehicles to consumers in 2003.

== Consumer models ==
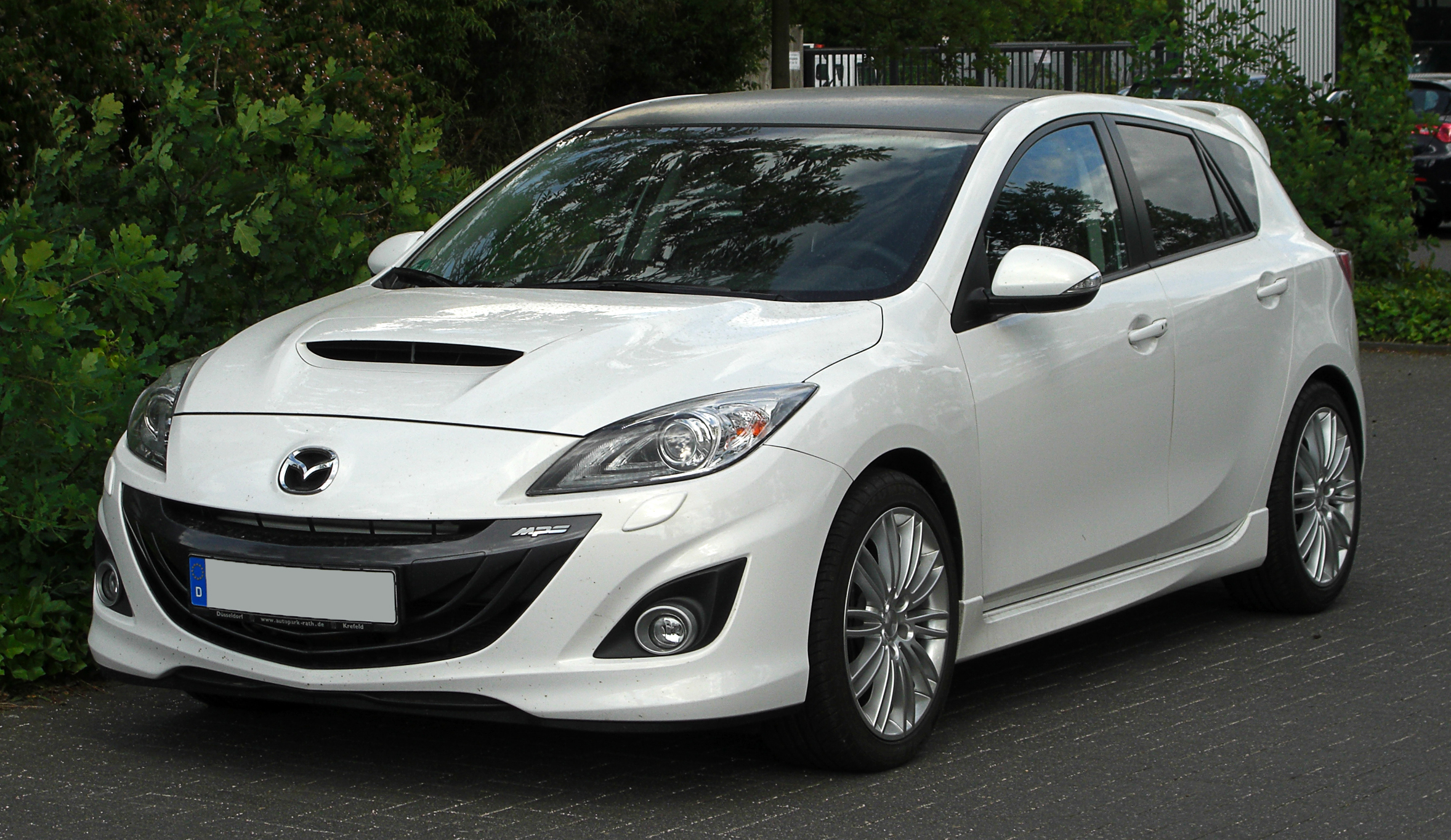
The second generation Mazdaspeed3 in Germany.

In 2003, Mazda debuted its first consumer-offered Mazdaspeed vehicle model, the 2003 Mazdaspeed Protegé. It was only released to the North American market as a performance upgrade to the Protegé MP3 and offered more power — from the MP3's 140 bhp (104 kW) to 170 bhp (127 kW) — by using a T25 Callaway-Garrett turbocharger and an intercooler. Some modifications included new front air dam and a new spoiler. The Japanese market Mazdaspeed Familia utilized a naturally aspirated FS-ZE 2.0L engine with higher compression and a revised camshafts to produce 173 hp (129 kW) at 6800 rpm.

A year after, in 2004, another Mazdaspeed model was offered: the Mazdaspeed MX-5 Miata, initially released in the North American market, followed by the Australian and Japanese markets. It featured an IHI single-scroll turbocharger producing 8.5 psi (0.6 bar) of boost to further increase power, from 142 bhp (106 kW; 144 PS) to 178 bhp (133 kW; 180 PS) and torque from 125 lb⋅ft (169 N⋅m) to 166 lb⋅ft (225 N⋅m). Mazda soon realized that these high performance models could be successful outside of North America and would make the next vehicles available worldwide.

In 2006, the Mazdaspeed6 was released globally, featuring the most powerful piston engine ever produced by Mazda at 274 bhp (204 kW; 278 PS) with an all-wheel drive layout.

The Mazdaspeed3 was introduced for the 2007 model year — which, with 263 bhp (196 kW; 267 PS) and 280 lb⋅ft (380 N⋅m) of torque — was the most powerful vehicle in its class.. In the fall of 2009, Mazda released the second generation 2010 Mazdaspeed3. The newly styled Mazdaspeed3 carried forward the MZR 2.3L DISI turbocharged engine again with 263 bhp (196 kW; 267 PS) at 5500 rpm and 280 lb⋅ft (380 N⋅m) of torque at 3000 rpm with refreshed interior, sheet metal, and body kit.

== Race branding ==
Mazda branded a selection of several racing series as the Mazdaspeed as well as a driver development ladder. This program began in 2005 and was organized by Mazda and promoters offering presented season winners in a given series with an automatic ride in the next series on the ladder.

The sports car version, Road to (the Rolex) 24 (at Daytona), offered winners of the Global MX-5 Cup Spec Miata series a promotion to the Prototype Lites series, and the winner there was offered a ride in the Continental Tire Sports Car Challenge, with opportunities later on in the IMSA WeatherTech United Sports Car Championship.

The single seater version, the Road to Indy, once offered drivers who won in any series a shootout where they could enter the US F2000 championship, advance to Pro Mazda, and then advance to Indy Lights, before earning a ride in the IndyCar Series. Mazda discontinued its participation of the Road To Indy ladder system in 2018 to focus on its IMSA sports car prototype program with the RT24-P and grassroots racing contingency program under the Global MX-5 Cup.
