= 1995 24 Hours of Le Mans =

63rd 24 Hours of Le Mans endurance race

Previous: 1994	Next: 1996
Index: Races | Winners

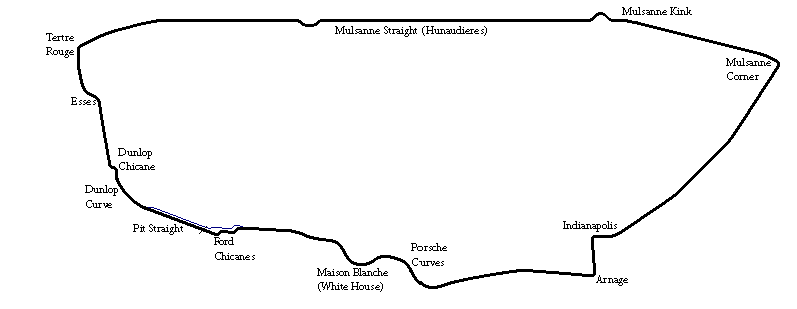
Le Mans in 1995

The 1995 24 Hours of Le Mans was the 63rd Grand Prix of Endurance and took place on 17 and 18 June 1995 in one of the wettest races in the event's history with about 17 hours of steady rain. The race was won by a McLaren F1 GTR driven by JJ Lehto, Yannick Dalmas and Masanori Sekiya, a consecutive win by a GT car. This was McLaren's first win at Le Mans, at its first attempt – only Ferrari had accomplished the same feat, in 1949. What was seen as remarkable was that the cars were untested over 24 hours, yet they led for all bar thirteen laps and at the end filled four of the first five places. Despite a careful Balance of Performance adjustment to try and match the WSC and GT cars, it was expected that the lighter weight and better downforce of the prototypes would prove superior. However, the extensive period of rain proved a bigger equaliser and took pressure off the delicate McLaren drivetrains.

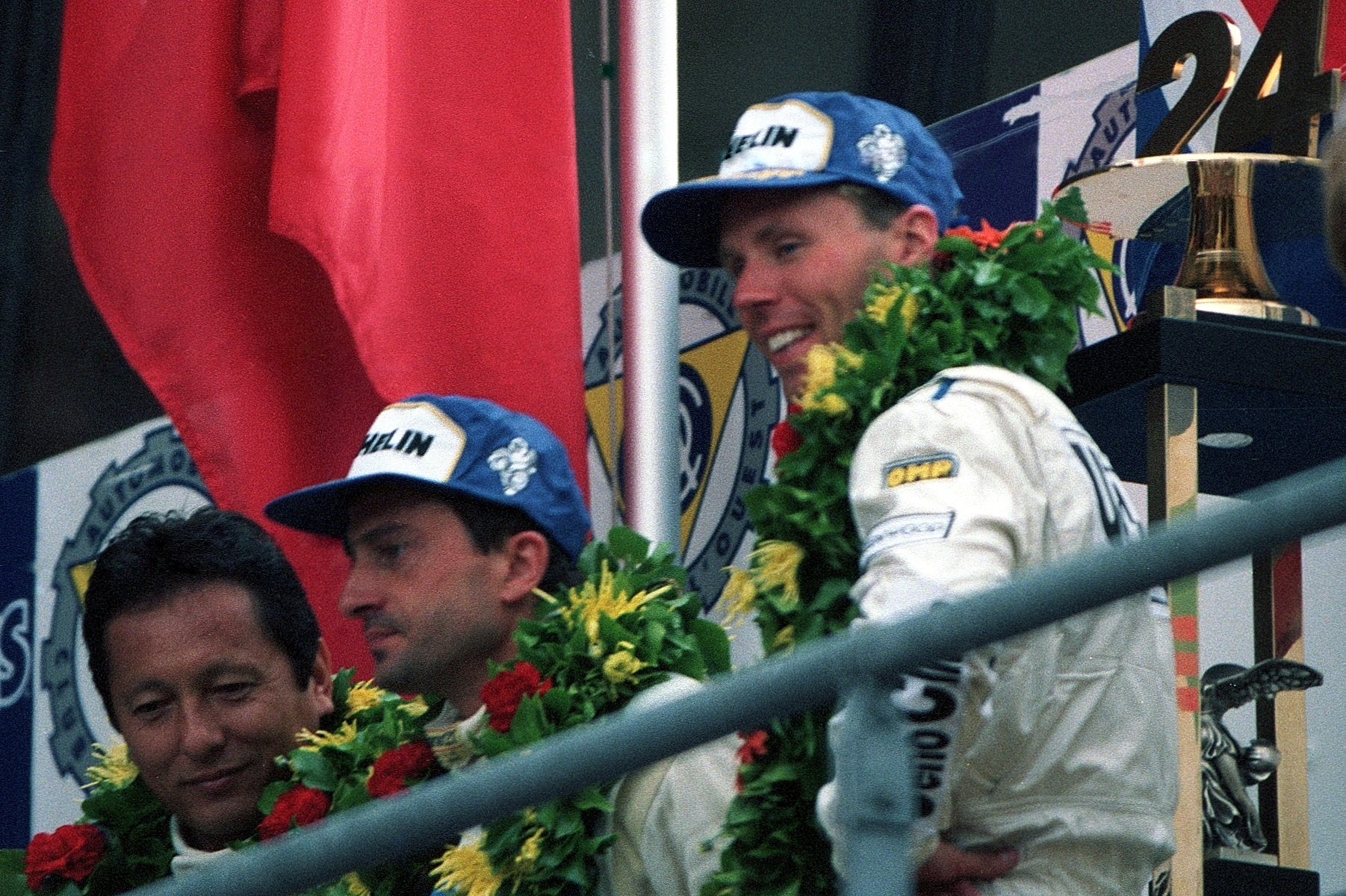
The winning drivers – Sekiya / Dalmas / Lehto

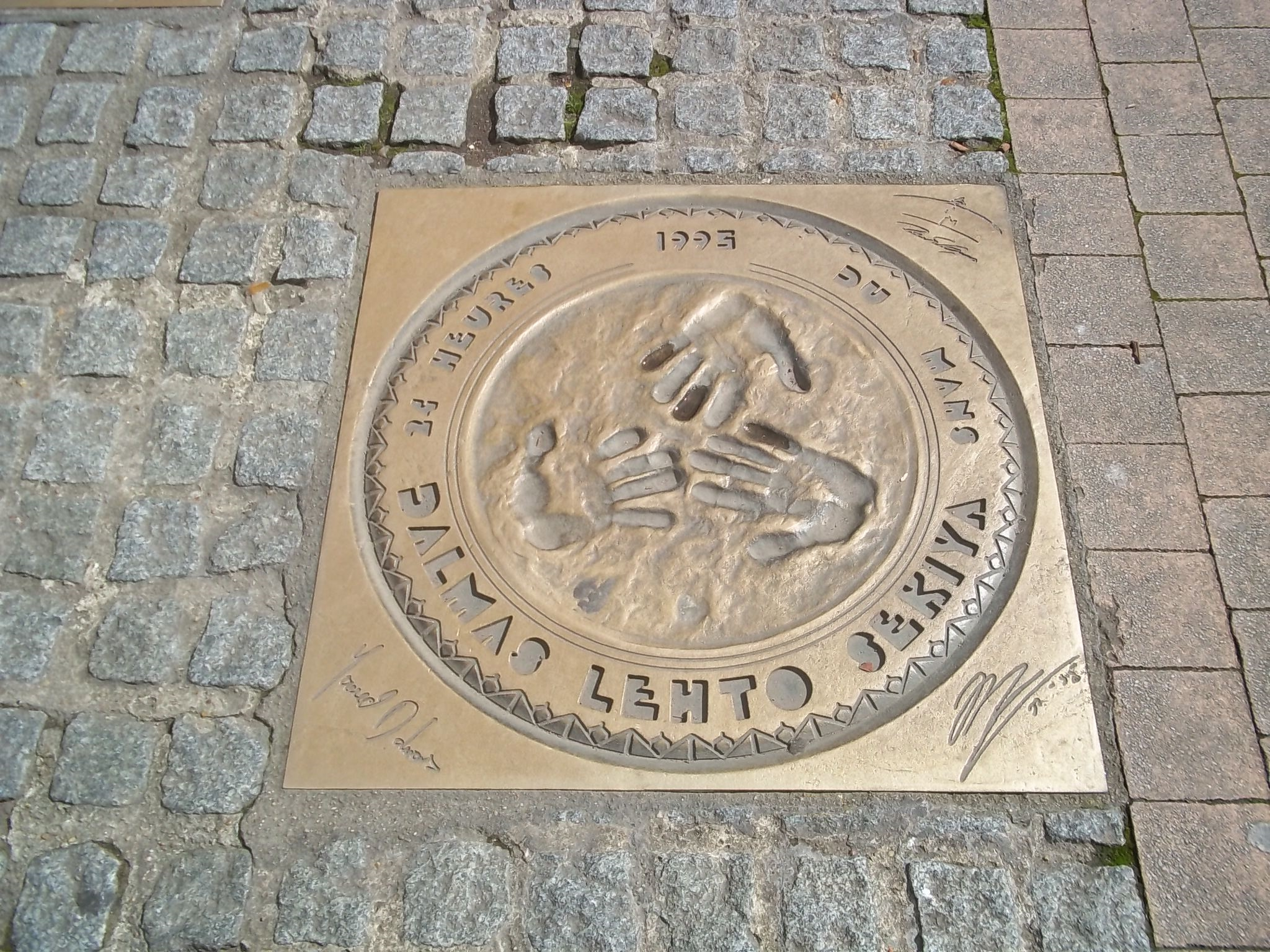
1995 victory plaque

The small, light WRs of the LM P2 class scored a coup by locking out the front row of the grid, ahead of the Courage-Porsche of Bob Wollek. From the start, these three put a gap on the rest of the field. However, when the rain arrived at the end of the first hour the WRs were delayed, and it was the McLarens that came to the fore, with Jochen Mass in the DPR car ahead of the Courage. However, in the fourth hour the race was put on pause when Patrick Gonin, in the recovering WR, aquaplaned off the Mulsanne Straight at speed and somersaulted. He was sent to hospital with several broken bones and the race resumed after a half-hour. Soon after though, Mario Andretti spun the Courage avoiding a backmarker and hit the barriers. Repairs cost 6 laps and dropped them down to 25th. This left McLarens running 1-2-3-5, with the Larbre Porsche in fourth, and a privateer Porsche leading GT2 in 7th. But the weather was taking a heavy toll with engines and causing accidents including those two Porsches and the leading Gulf McLaren. Mass and Nielsen took back the lead and had it for over eight hours until stopped by a broken clutch at 3am. It was the sister DPR car of Wallace and the Bells, father and son, that picked up the lead into the day with the KK McLaren in pursuit. The rain finally eased mid-morning and, finally to show its speed on the drying track, the Courage had got back up to third after hard driving by Wollek, Andretti and Hélary, but two laps down. However, Derek Bell was having to race with a deteriorating gearbox. At the penultimate fuel-stop, a crucial five minutes were lost trying to get the car into gear. Dalmas swept past into the lead and then soon after the Courage got by. Going into the last hour, Wollek got back onto the lead lap but could get no closer and Dalmas brought the McLaren home to win by three-quarters of a lap. The best GT2 car was a privateer Honda NSX, winning a long tussle on Sunday against the Callaway Corvettes. After an engine fire in the race warm-up and losing 6 laps in the second hour of the race, better fuel economy and strong driving had seen the team through.

== Regulations ==
There was a fundamental change to the prototype regulations this year. With the ongoing good working relationship with IMSA, the Automobile Club de l'Ouest (ACO) phased out its LM-P1 category, instead drawing up regulations based closely on IMSA's new World Sportscar (WSC) class (albeit not adopting them directly). In return, IMSA agreed to allow turbo-engined cars into WSC, given the number of Group C chassis still in circulation. The ACO still used air-inlet restrictors to balance performance but now linked them to the car-weight as well as engine. The GT classes were now given smaller fuel-tanks, but also had their minimum weights reduced. The GT1 cars were entitled to bigger air restrictors to the GT2s that therefore gave them more power.

- WSC max 4.0L production engine, or 3.0L for turbos, with rev limit of 8500 rpm (for 2-valve V8) or 10500 rpm (for 4-valve V12), fuel tank 80L, minimum weight graded according to engine size and type, max tyre width 18"
- LM P2: fuel tank 80L, min weight 620 kg, with production engines, max tyre width 12"
- LM GT1: fuel tank 100L, min weight 900 kg, max tyre width 14"
- LM GT2: fuel tank 100L, min weight 900 kg, max tyre width 12"

The previous year's "one-off model" rule, controversially exploited by Porsche in the 1994 race with the Dauer 962 Le Mans, stayed in place for GT1. However, GT2 cars had to be based on road-cars in series production since February 1995. With the great increase in interest, the ACO saw a need to build 2 further pit bays to increase potential capacity to 48 cars. For the first time, the committee would select 20 significant teams to give an automatic entry. From the rest, 50 would now be chosen to undergo a pre-qualifying session at the end of April and from that run-off a final additional 34 cars would qualify for the race, including four reserves.

A new tradition initiated this year was a drivers' parade through the city starting at the Place des Jacobins beside the cathedral, where the scrutineering took place. It drew a crowd of 40,000 as they were carried through the streets in classic cars.

== Entries ==
Such was the resurgence of interest in endurance racing and the new regulations, that the ACO received 99 applications for this year's race. After the 20 chosen as automatic entries, the remaining starters came from the pre-qualifying event. The great majority of the 52 cars present for race-week were in the two GT classes, and there were only 12 prototypes. The BPR series was proving very popular often with over 30 cars at each race, from a number of manufacturers.

The WSC-class was expanding, with entries from Courage, Kremer, Mazda along with the first Ferrari prototype seen at Le Mans since 1973. The Japanese manufacturers had a strong presence at Le Mans. As well as Mazda in WSC, Nissan, Toyota and Honda backed multi-car teams in LM-GT1. They would be up against experienced teams currently competing in the BPR series.

Class	Quantity	Turbo and Rotary engines
LM-WSC	9 / 6	4 / 4
LM-P2	4 / 3	3 / 3
LM-GT1	29 / 27	18 / 17
LM-GT2	13 / 12	6 / 6
Total Entries	55 / 48	31 / 30

- Note: The first number is the number accepted, the second the number who started.

Class	Car Nbr	Car	Engine	Weight (kg)	Air Restrictors	bhp
LM-WSC	1	Ferrari 333 SP	Ferrari 4.0L V12	895		630
	4	Kremer K8	Porsche 3.0L F6 twin-turbo	910		540
	5	Kudzu DG2/3	Mazda tri-rotor (2.0L equiv)	820		480
	11	Courage C41	Chevrolet 5.0L V8	850		560
	13	Courage C34	Porsche 3.0 F6 twin-turbo	900	34.5mm	550
LM-P2	8	WR LM95	Peugeot 1.9L S4 turbo	640	42mm	450
	14	Debora LMP295	Cosworth 2.0L S4 turbo	700		400
LM-GT1	22	Nissan Skyline GT-R	Nissan 2.6L S6 twin-turbo	1170		400
	24	McLaren F1 GTR	BMW 6.1L V12	1125	39.4mm	640
	26	SARD MC8-R	Lexus 4.0L V8 twin-turbo	1275	40.7mm	600
	27	Toyota Supra GT-LM	Toyota 2.1L S4 turbo	1245	55.9mm	650
	30	Chevrolet Corvette ZR-1	Chevrolet 6.2L V8	1280	58.9mm	570
	36	Porsche 911 GT2 Evo	Porsche 3.6L F6 twin-turbo	1140	40.4mm	600
	54	Porsche 911 BiTurbo	Porsche 3.8L F6 twin-turbo	1165		700
	40	Ferrari F40 GTE	Ferrari 3.0L V8 twin-turbo	1115		620
	44	Venturi 600S-LM	Renault 3.0L V6 twin-turbo	1065		640
	47	Honda NSX GT1	Honda 3.0L V6 twin-turbo	1055		600
	52	Lister Storm	Jaguar 7.0L V12	1270	43.9mm	620
	57	Jaguar XJ220C	Jaguar 3.5L V6 twin-turbo	1170	38.9mm	600
LM-GT2	70	Marcos 600LM	Chevrolet 6.2L V8	1190	36.4mm	530
	76	Callaway Corvette SuperNatural	Chevrolet 6.2L V8	1120	50.8mm	480
	76	Porsche 911 GT2	Porsche 3.6L F6 twin-turbo	1175	33.8mm	450
	76	Honda NSX GT	Honda 3.0L V6	1055		390

=== LM-WSC ===
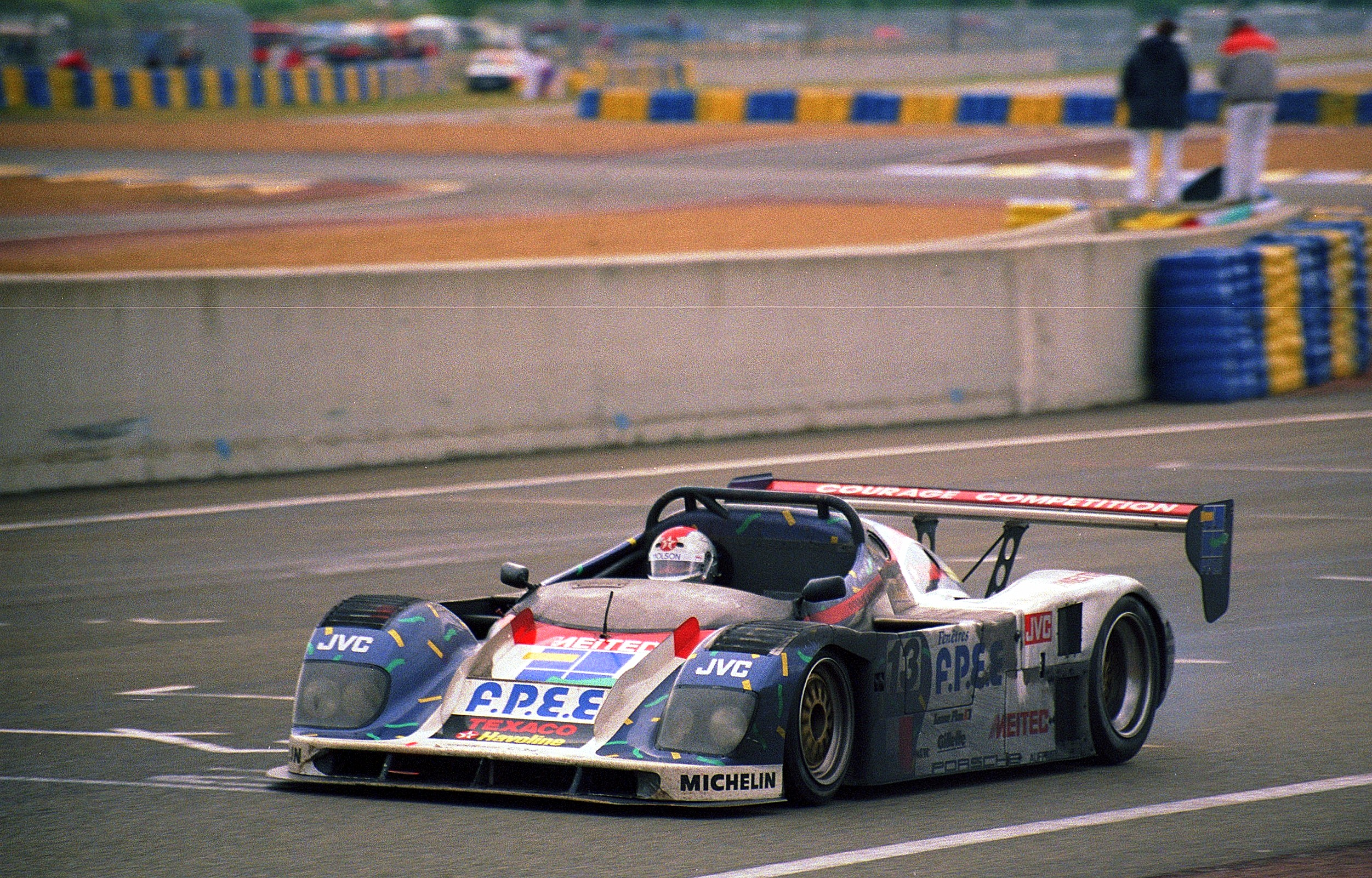
Courage C34

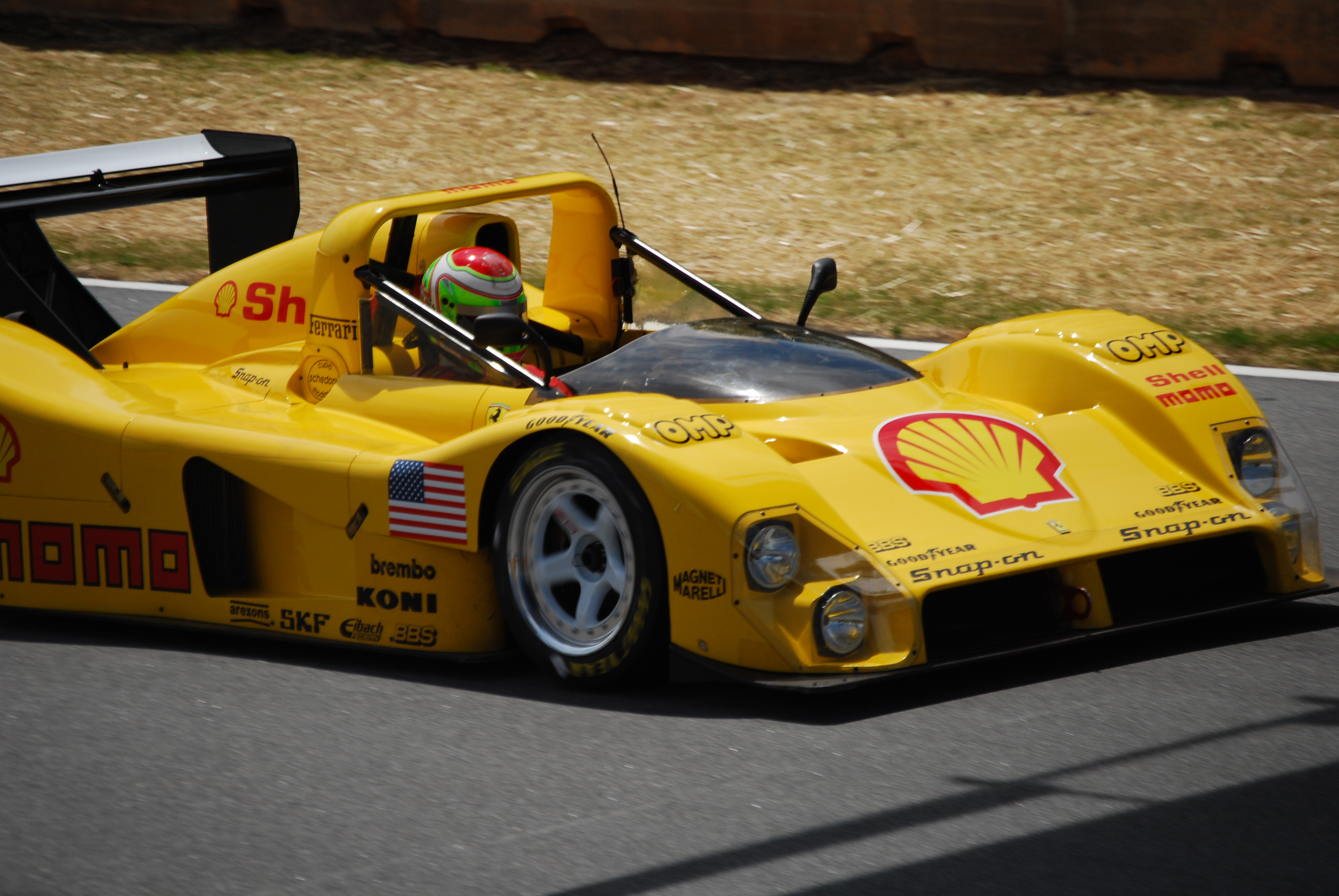
Ferrari 333 SP

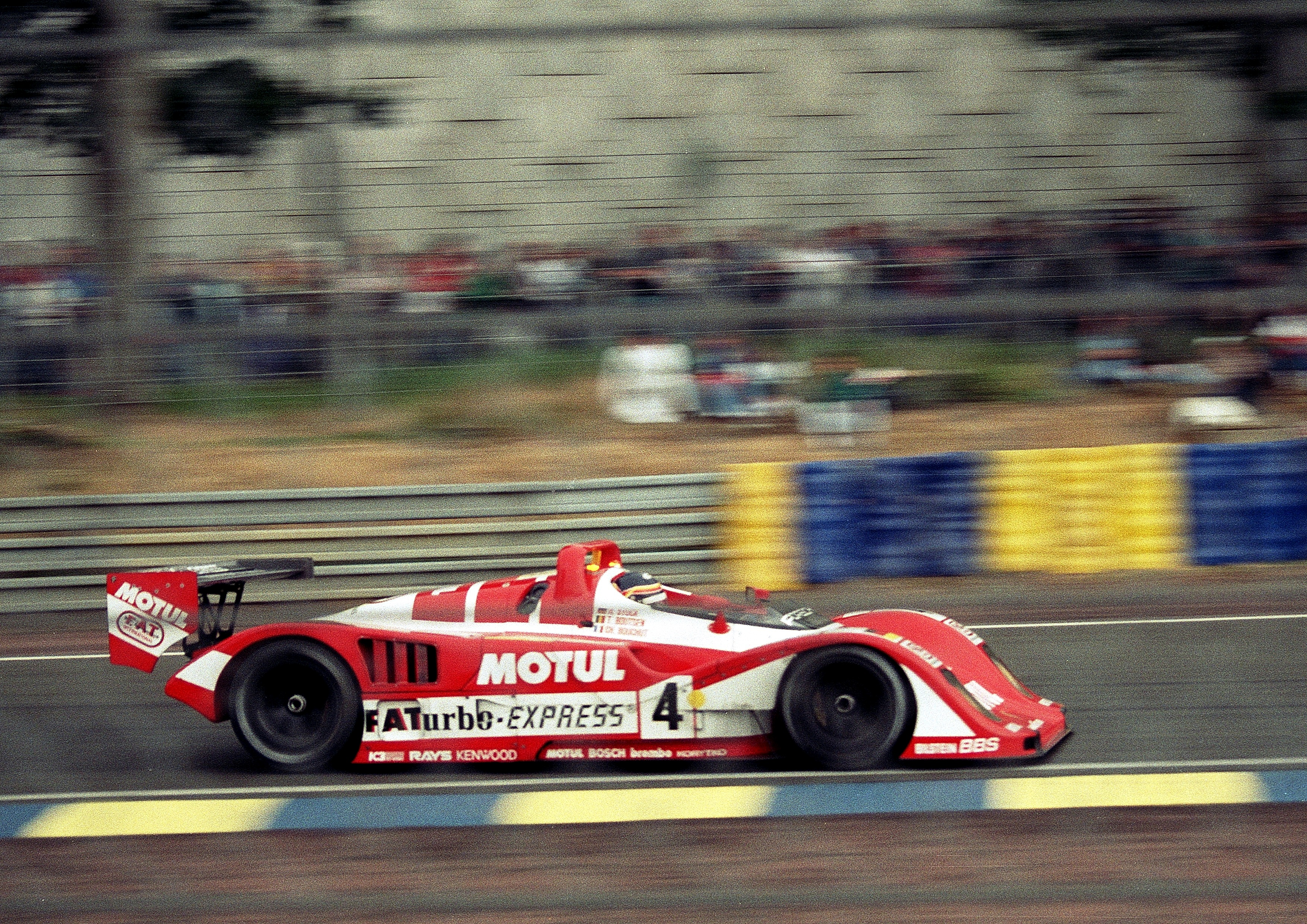
Kremer K8 of Stuck/Boutsen/Bouchut

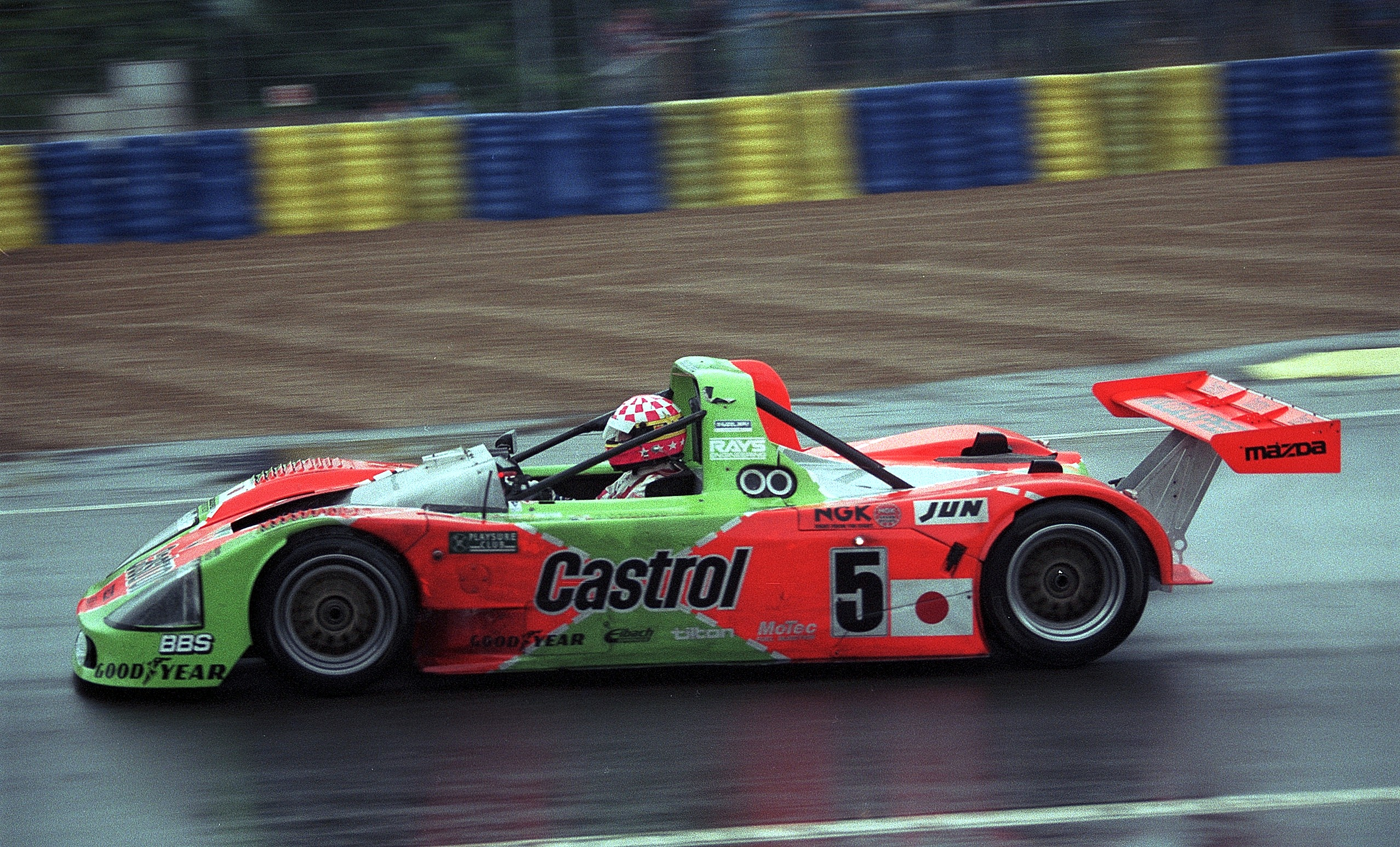
Kudzu DG-3

With the withdrawal of the Peugeot and Toyota sports-prototypes, this left Courage Compétition in prime position to achieve Yves Courage's dream to win Le Mans. The lead car, carrying his traditional #13, was a C34 spyder - essentially a WSC conversion of the Group C-based C30 model, itself a design from the 1980s Cougars. It was fitted with the tried and tested 3-litre Porsche flat-6 twin-turbo engine, now trimmed to 550 bhp by its 34.5mm air-restrictors. A very experienced line-up was installed: Bob Wollek was back for the 25th time, every year since 1973, and still looking for his first outright win; Mario Andretti was attempting to complete the third leg of an elusive Triple Crown – winning Le Mans, Indianapolis and the Formula 1 Championship – a feat only achieved by Graham Hill. He had first raced at Le Mans in 1966, but only came on board at the beginning of June; Éric Hélary was a Le Mans-winner, having won as a rookie in 1993 for Peugeot. The Courage C41 was a purpose-built WSC contestant to race in IMSA and Le Mans. Built on a carbon-fibre monocoque with a carbon and kevlar bodyshell. Designed to be a customer car, it was deliberately built to accommodate any engine. The first model had a 5-litre Chevrolet "small-block" V8 which, with the 8000rpm IMSA limit, put out 600 bhp. Not ready for the 1994 season, it finally ran at the Le Mans test weekend where Eric van der Poele posted the second fastest time behind teammate Bob Wollek in the C34. Two C41s were prepared at Courage's new factory. Van de Poele was joined by ex-F1 Larrousse driver Olivier Beretta and rookie Mathiaz Tomlje. For the second car, they once again got the experience of 52-year-old Henri Pescarolo, with former Ligier Formula 1 drivers Franck Lagorce and Éric Bernard. The team was confident after Wollek set the fastest time at the April pre-qualification in the C34, with van de Poele second in the new C41.

When it first appeared in the 1994 IMSA WSC series, the new Ferrari 333 SP prototype had had an instant impact, winning 5 of the 9 races. It was born from a concept by Giampiero Moretti and Enzo Ferrari's son Piero. The car had been designed in 1993 for the IMSA rules and then modified by Tony Southgate. It was a flat-bottom carbonfibre monocoque with the bodyshell fabricated by Dallara and Michelotto in Italy. The WSC regulations were that the 4.0-litre engine had to be from a production model. The F310E V12 had five valves per cylinder and was related to its Formula 1 engine and the upcoming F50 supercar. With its Weber-Marelli fuel-injection, it produced up to 630 bhp. Special modification was also needed to run the V12 on European fuel, with its lower octane rating compared to American racing fuel (98 vs 103 octane). Ferrari was not supportive of an entry as the car was unproven over the distance (although the Scandia Ferrari had won this year's Sebring 12-hour race). However, Antonio Ferrari's EuroInternational team, who had received one of the first chassis, generated much interest from the press and the ACO gave it #1 in the entry-list, as the first Ferrari prototype at Le Mans since 1973. Lead driver, Jay Cochran, who had given the marque its first WSC victory in April 1994, would drive alongside co-owner Massimo Sigala and former Ferrari F1 driver René Arnoux. Despite the victory at Sebring earlier this year, question-marks still remained over the 333 SP's reliability over 24 hours.

The Kremer brothers bought back the K8 Spyder that had raced in the 1994 race, then on-sold it to Franz Konrad. A second chassis was completed, which was taken to Daytona where it scored a surprise victory, as quicker cars fell by the wayside. One of the winning drivers Jürgen Lässig joined Brazilian Antonio Herrmann de Azevedo and Konrad in his car. The bulletproof flat-6 engines were tuned at the Porsche factory and still put out 540 bhp. The company also supported their longstanding customer team by releasing works drivers Hans-Joachim Stuck and Thierry Boutsen to run in the Daytona chassis with another of its winning drivers, Christophe Bouchut.

Jim Downing was a long-time customer for Mazda in the IMSA series, winning several championships in both GT and Prototype classes. He had started producing his own Kudzu prototypes in 1988, joining the fledgling WSC-class in 1993. His lead driver, Wayne Taylor won the IMSA championship in 1994 with the DG-3 chassis. In the new year, the team scored a third place at Daytona before the chassis was written off in a crash while running a strong third at Sebring. That left the team less than two months to adapt one of the two older DG-2 cars to the DG-3 spec (as per their original entry form). With full works support from the Mazdaspeed team, including long-time works driver Yojiro Terada, current works driver Franck Fréon and designer Nigel Stroud who had been a part of their 1991 Le Mans-winning team. The open-top DG-3 was limited by WSC rules to only running the R20B triple-rotor, rather than the more powerful Mazda R26B quad-rotor of the race-winning 787B. The R20B could put out 465 bhp. The car was decked out in the same distinctive red-and-green style as the race-winning 787 from 1991.

Norbert Santos had come to Le Mans in 1990 with his own Norma M6 design, with its experimental W12 engine. He returned this year with his new model, the open-topped Norma M14 which was powered by a conventional 500 bhp 4.5-litre Buick V6 engine. The intention was to replace that with a less powerful 4.2L engine to last the race. His lead driver was Dominique Lacaud. Fellow Frenchman, Sylvain Boulay, modified his old Tiga GC287 chassis (that had done several IMSA seasons) to meet the WSC regulations. Like the Norma, it was an open-top spyder with a Buick V6 engine.

=== LM-P2 ===
Gérard Welter brought two cars for another tilt at Le Mans. Extensive testing at the Circuit Paul Ricard had led to improvements to the design. The small 1.9-litre Peugeot engine was tuned up to 400 bhp. Weighing less than 650 kg, they were the lightest cars in the field and their power-to-weight ratio was therefore comparable to the WSC cars. The #9 chassis was refashioned from 1994, while the #8 was a brand-new unit. The team had an all-French driver lineup: Patrick Gonin and Pierre Petit drove together again, taking the LM95, along with Marc Rostan who hoped to be able to qualify with them this year. Jean-Bernard Bouvet and Richard Balandras had driven a Graff Racing Spice in the 1993 event and were joined by young debutante William David in the older chassis.

The thin field in LM-P2 was completed by Didier Bonnet and his Debora spyder. The new model for this year, the LMP295 had a carbon-kevlar body on an aluminium chassis. This year, the team swapped out the Alfa Romeo V6 for the 2-litre Cosworth BDG engine also used in the Ford Escort turbo. With its Garrett turbocharger, it could put out 450 bhp.

=== LM GT1 ===
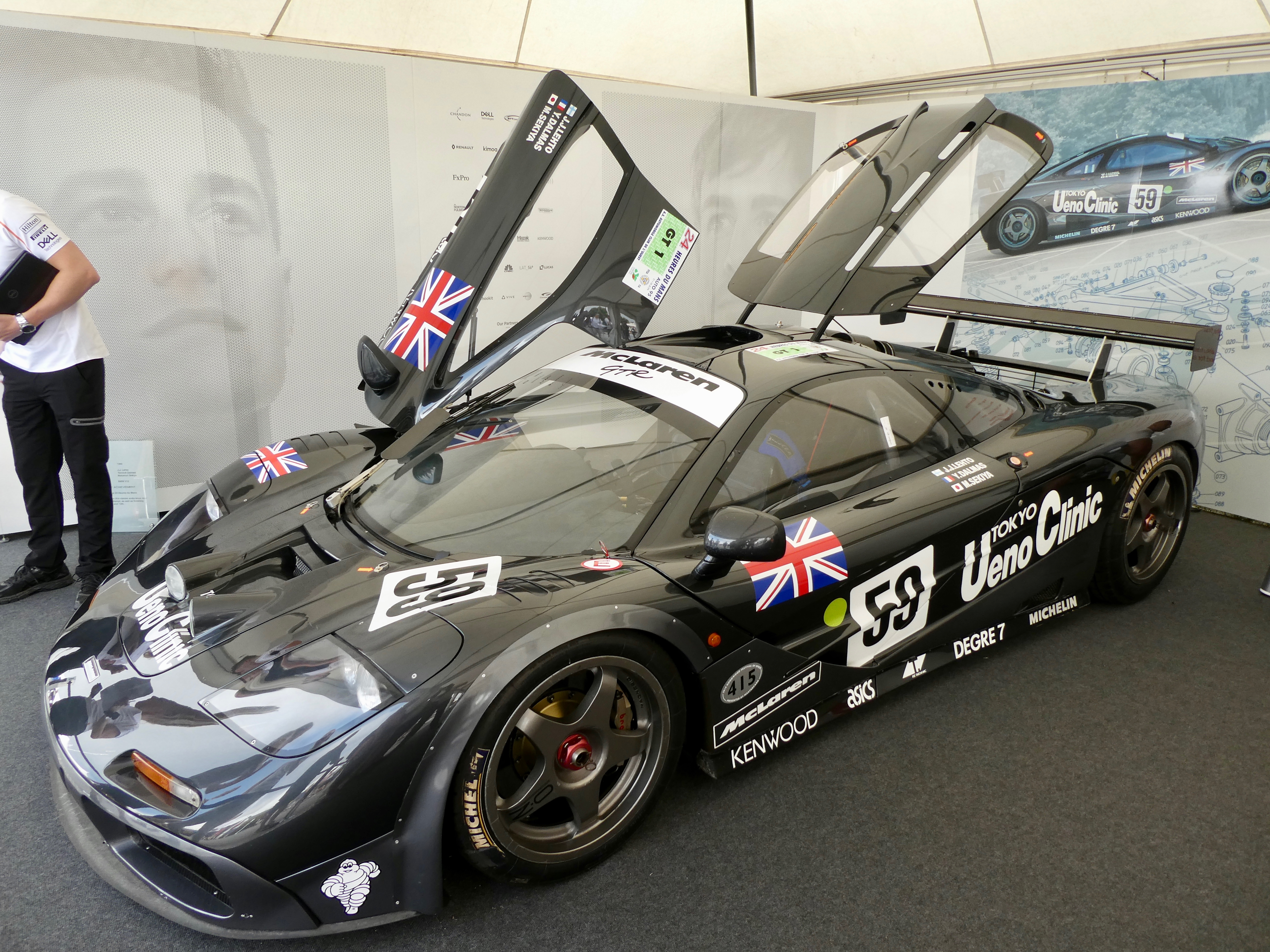
McLaren F1 GTR

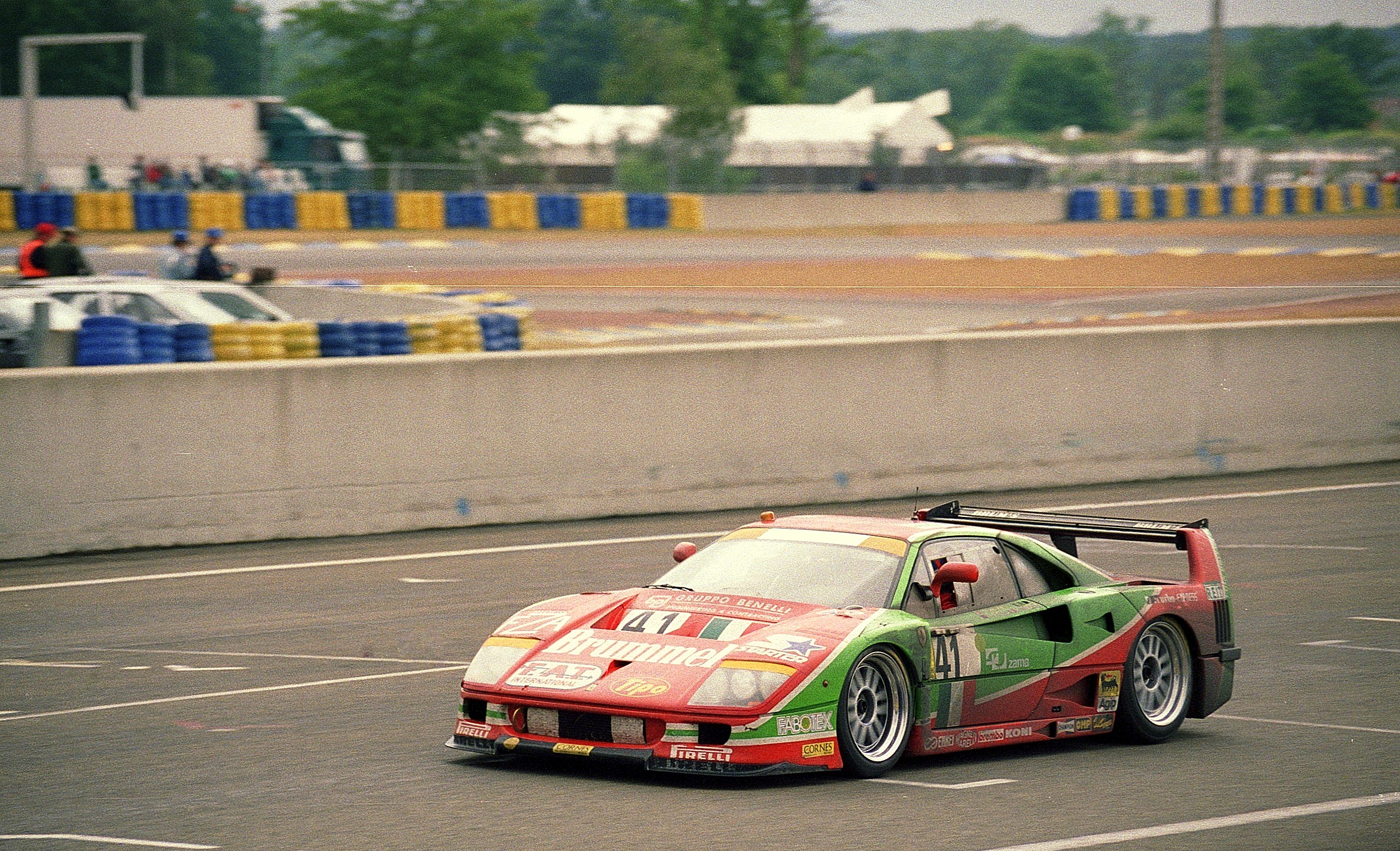
Ferrari F40 GTE

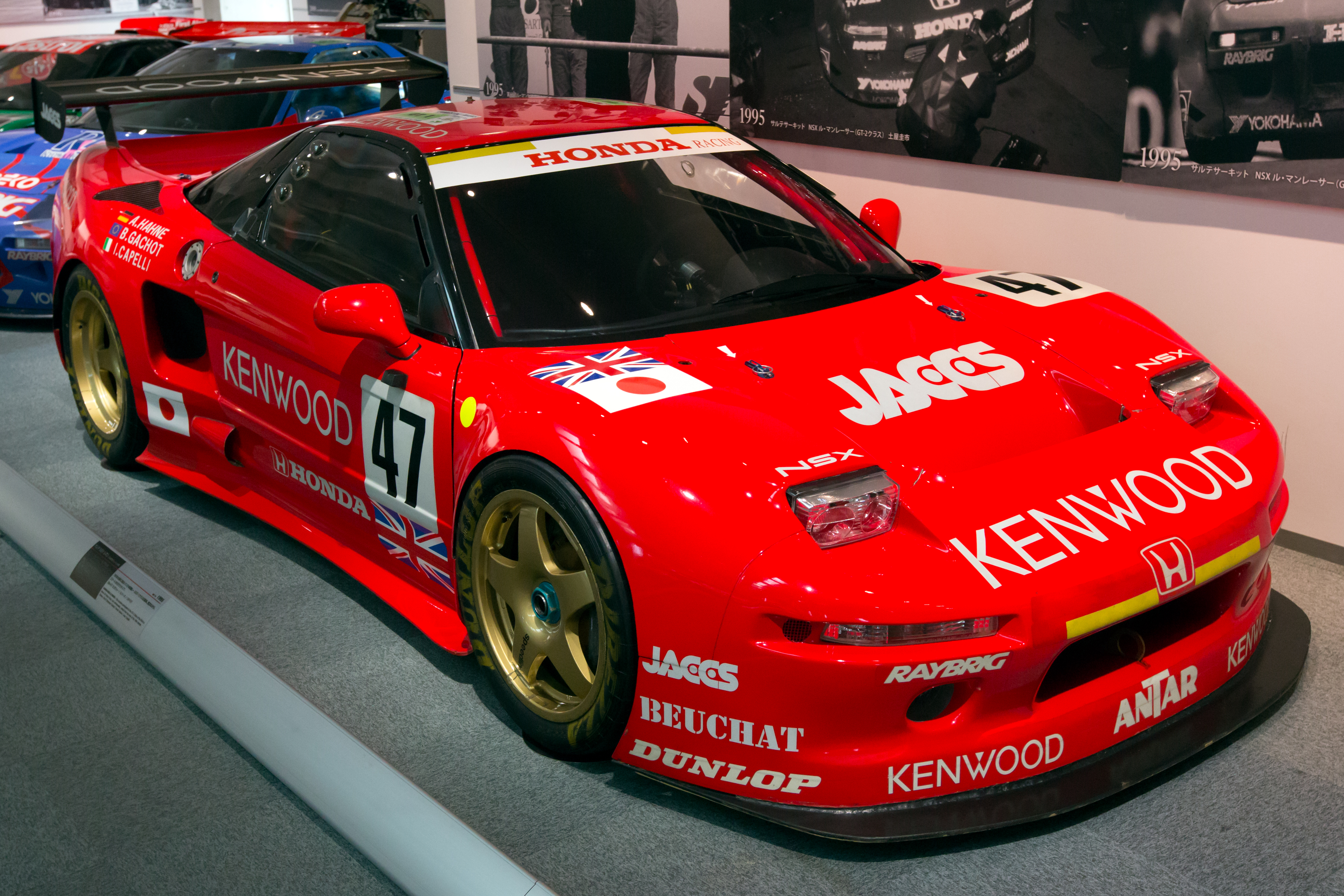
Honda NSX

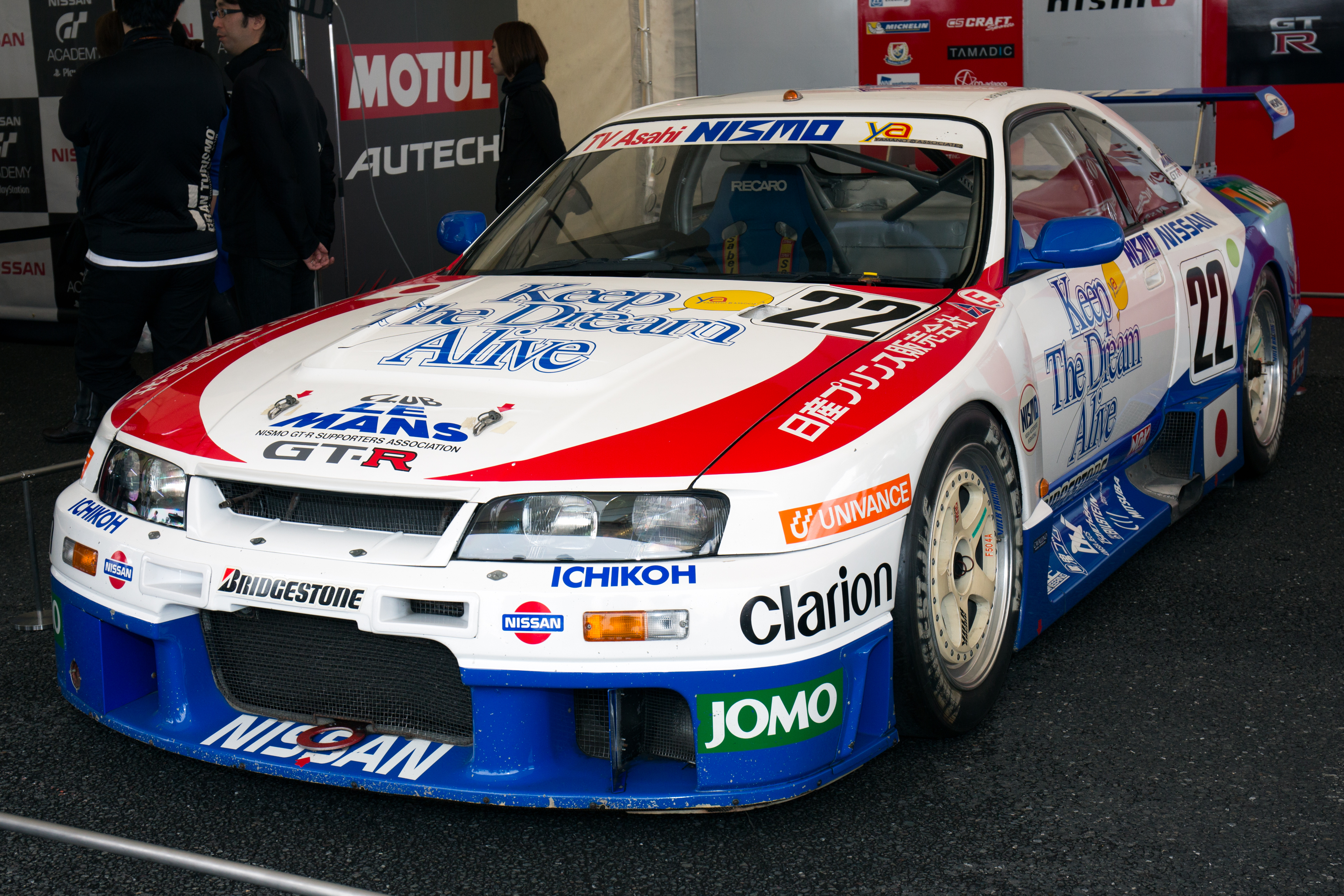
Nissan Skyline GT-R

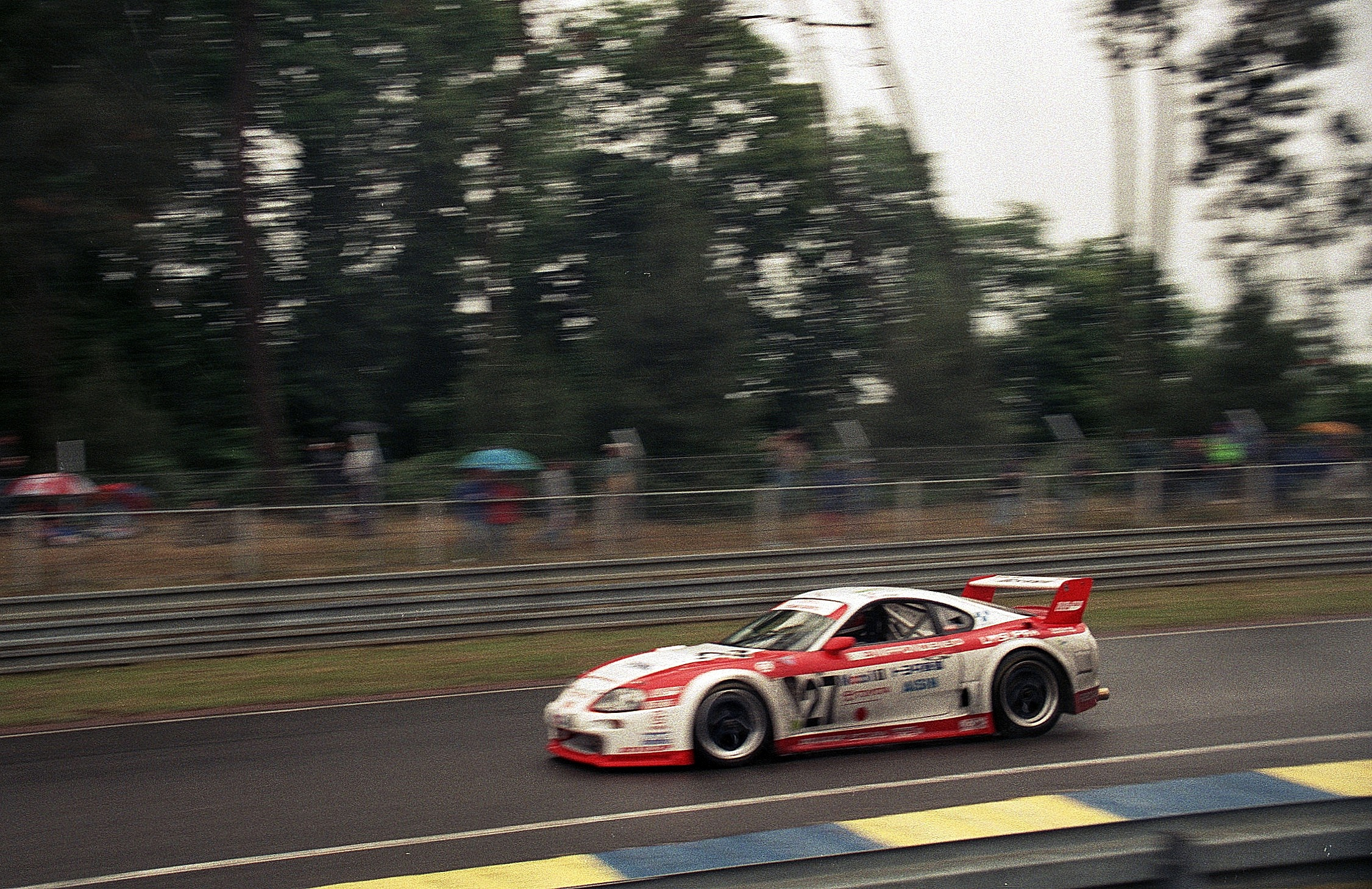
Toyota Supra

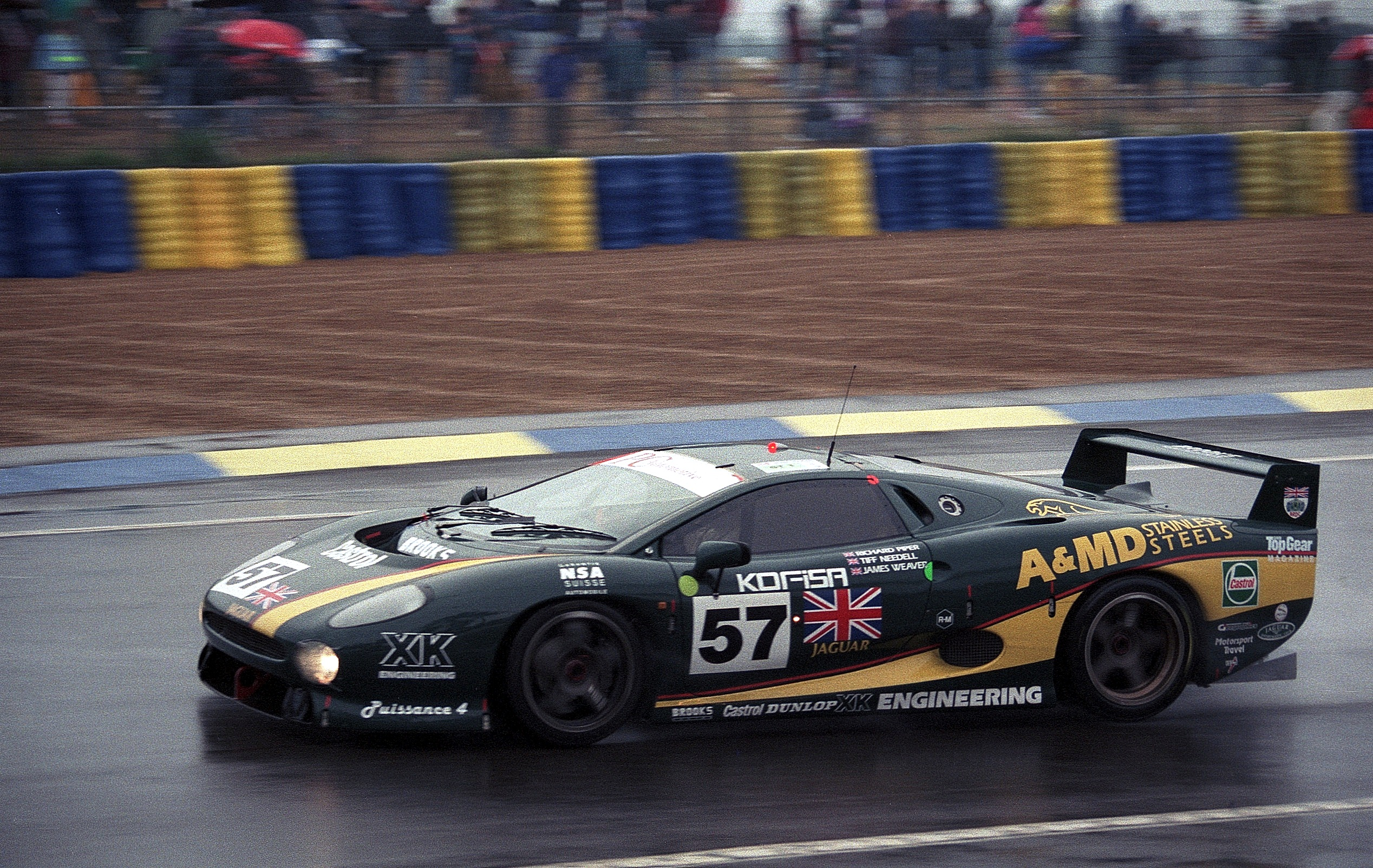
Jaguar XJ220C

The biggest news for this year's race in the GT classes was the arrival of McLaren and its F1 GTR. This was the racing version of the £650,000 McLaren F1 supercar, that had been designed by Gordon Murray and was the fastest production car in the world at the time. Murray had been successful with the Brabham Formula 1 team in the 1970s before greater success with McLaren in the 1980s. The F1 had been released in 1992, the first model of the new production company, drawing on the experience of the racing team. An innovative 3-seater design with the driver sitting centrally, it had "butterfly" doors and a mid-mounted engine. The chassis was a monocoque built with carbonfibre weave over an aluminium honeycomb, and a carbon/kevlar bodyshell. After being turned down by Honda, McLaren team manager Ron Dennis approached BMW to produce an engine. The purpose-designed unit was a 6064cc (370 cu in) quad-cam V12 with variable valve timing controlled by a TAGtronic management system and capable of 625 bhp through a 6-speed Getrag gearbox. In 1994, gentlemen racers Ray Bellm and Thomas Bscher convinced Dennis to develop a racing version, and former Spice Engineering director Jeff Hazell was made the project manager. Virtually all that was needed was upgraded suspension, carbon brakes and a rollcage. With the catalytic converters and silencers removed and the proscribed 39.4mm air-restrictors, the engine could be tuned up to 635 bhp. The April test however showed that the cars were not on the pace of the Ferraris, and a last-minute aero-kit was put together by the factory. The carbon brakes were lighter, and would not need changing through the race, but required 50% extra cooling so the front section was redesigned to redirect airflow. Murray's effort also concentrated on strengthening the fragile clutch and installing a dry-sump gearbox, unproven beyond four hours of racing. Six cars were delivered to customers: two each to Bellm and Bscher and one to Fabian Giroix and Noël del Bello. A seventh went to Bellm after one was wrecked at Jarama, while the original test-car was kept by the company. The cars were instantly successful, winning 6 of the 7 races in the 1995 BPR Global GT Series to date. All the cars came to Le Mans, making it the second-most represented marque at the event after the ubiquitous Porsches. Four of those BPR victories had gone to the GTC Gulf Racing team of Ray Bellm, driving with Maurizio Sandro Sala. For Le Mans they brought in 1992-winner Mark Blundell as the third driver. The second car was led by Bellm's associate Lindsay Owen-Jones, CEO of L'Oréal, who had the experienced pair of Pierre-Henri Raphanel and Philippe Alliot as co-drivers. Bscher's two cars were run by David Price, who had been team manager successively for Richard Lloyd Racing, Sauber-Mercedes and Nissan Motorsports Europe during the Group C era. Bscher, with Dane John Nielsen, had won the other two BPR races for McLaren and were joined by Jochen Mass. After announcing his retirement the year before, 54-year old Derek Bell had been convinced to return for the opportunity to race with his son, Justin for a Le Mans victory in the second car, with another Jaguar winner, Andy Wallace. The car ran in the yellow-and-green Harrods livery of car-owner Moody Fayed. Both French teams, Jacadi Racing and BBA Compétition, had exchanged their Venturis for the McLaren. Neither was equipped with the full Le Mans kit, fitted with steel brakes for example. The Jacadi car was running on a synthetic alcohol fuel derived from beets. The BBA car was this year's "art-car" with co-driver, and gallery owner, Hervé Poulain this year engaging César Baldaccini who produced an eye-catching black and silver design. An eighth car was being built for Paul Lanzante, a friend of Ron Dennis and currently running a Porsche in the BPR series. When it was apparent that it would not be ready in time, the company offered Lanzante the test-car instead. His racing team, Lanzante Motorsport, was supported by Japanese slot-machine company "Kokusai Kaihatsu" for their entry. The other teams were quite disgruntled when it appeared a "works" entry was now in their midst, which was a breach of the £700,000 contract with each customer. However, McLaren assured them it was a private entry with no special treatment. Former Formula 1 drivers JJ Lehto and Yannick Dalmas (team-mates in the DTM Championship this year) were employed with Japanese Le Mans veteran Masanori Sekiya as its drivers. Sekiya had always been passionate about Le Mans, having got married in the townhall during the 1987 raceweek.

After some success in 1994, Ferrari looked at developing the F40. The result was the GT Evoluzione, with improved aerodynamics and suspension, while Ferrari worked on 3.5- and 3.6-litre twin-turbo engines. Luciano della Noce teamed up with the Ferrari Club Italia with two cars. They chose to run with the 3.0-litre, 620 bhp, engine that would be better suited for endurance. Della Noce and his regular co-driver Anders Olofsson had scored a third place at the Monza BPR round, and were regularly setting the fastest race-laps, albeit without the reliability. They were joined by Japanese driver Tetsuya Ota. The other entry came from RFR Sport, Stéphane Ratel's new team, racing under the Pilot Aldix Racing name, running the older F40 LM model. This car had raced in IMSA in 1989-90 and had been retrieved from a Swiss motoring museum. It had revised suspension (making it 2" wider) and bigger brakes. They also selected smaller restrictors than the Italian team (38 vs 39mm) to allow a lighter weight. Being an older version, spare parts were an issue however, team chief Michel Ferté still managed to set the fastest GT-time at the April Pre-Qualifying event.

Porsche's GT1 answer to the McLaren was still being developed and not ready yet. However, to satisfy teams looking to step up to the class from GT2, the company made an upgrade package for the current 911 model – the Porsche 993. The GT2 Evo had a modified bodyshell with a higher rear wing and bigger wheel fairings to take wider tyres. The 3.6-litre engine had bigger twin-KKK (Kühnle, Kopp & Kausch) turbos that could put out 600 bhp. Despite bigger ABS brakes, the car was still 40 kg lighter than its GT2 cousin. Two new cars for Jack Leconte's Caen-based Larbre Compétition were only delivered on the Monday of race-week, after a shakedown at the Porsche factory. With a veteran driver line up of Jean-Pierre Jarier, Bob Wollek and Christophe Bouchut, they had put in strong performances in the BPR Series with three seconds and a third in first four races. However, with Wollek and Bouchut seconded to WSC teams for this race, new driver line-ups had to be built. Jarier was joined by Érik Comas and Jesús Pareja and the second Evo had Dominique Dupuy, Stéphane Ortelli and the debut of a 24-year old Emmanuel Collard. Leconte himself led a third car, taking up the unused entry of privateer Jean-Claude Miloé, on the Reserves list. The other GT1 Porsche was a 911 Bi-Turbo from Manfred Freisinger's team. Operating one of the biggest Porsche spare parts dealerships in Europe, they had fitted a bigger, 3.8-litre, turbo engine that blasted out 700 bhp (for an extra 26 kg weight) and linked to a 4-speed gearbox. Bob Wollek has done the fastest lap in this car at the Paris BPR round. Freisinger's BPR drivers Wolfgang Kaufmann and Michel Ligonnet were joined by Yukihiro Hane.

Overall, Honda had had a positive first run at Le Mans in 1994, with Kremer getting all three cars to the finish. This year, they arrived a full 3-car works team, with two cars built up to the GT1 specification. Using John Thompson's workshop at TCP Racing, the engine was turned 90 degrees in its bay, which lengthened the wheelbase and required a new bodyshell. A stronger racing gearbox and carbon brakes were also fitted. In an unusual move, one of the cars was normally aspirated, while the other was fitted with twin Garrett turbochargers. Without the turbos, the engine put out 410 bhp and with the turbo power it was boosted up to 600 bhp. That car had a veteran line-up with Armin Hahne, Bertrand Gachot (1991 winner) and ex F1 Ferrari driver Ivan Capelli, and the other had sports-journalist, and Spa 24hr winner, Naoki Hattori with longtime Honda driver Hideki Okada and Swiss Philippe Favre. The Nissan Skyline GT-R had been dominant in Japanese, British and Australian racing in the early '90s. It had won the Spa 24-hours in 1991, and shown well at the Daytona enduro, so the company saw worth in taking on Le Mans, and two works entries arrived. The new R33 version had been released this year, with a strengthened version of the 2.6-litre twin-turbo engine rated at 600 bhp. The four-wheel drive was not allowed in the Le Mans regulations, so the cars were adapted to rear-wheel drive. Curiously, they were not identical. One (#22) had 42.6mm restrictors and a standard 5-speed gearbox making it 1370 kg, while #23 had a new 6-speed Xtrac sequential gearbox, 39.9mm restrictors and weighing 1285 kg. Despite a carbon-composite body, either way the cars were the heaviest in the field. An experienced team of drivers was assembled. The 6-speed Nissan was assigned to the very experienced Kazuyoshi Hoshino and Toshio Suzuki. They were joined by Masahiko Kageyama who had won back-to-back titles in the first two JGTC championships, with the Skyline of Hoshino's team. The other team included Japanese singer Masahiko Kondo.

The Toyota Supra had been a regular contender in Japanese GT racing, but this was its first entry at Le Mans. Shin Kato's SARD team had been a strong customer team for Toyota in the Group C era and was keen for the company's move into GT1. The Toyota engine used was the proven 2.1-litre used in the IMSA-winning Eagle MkIII. With the turbocharger, it put out 650 bhp. Two chassis were prepared, but the second for Trust Racing (their other customer team) was wrecked in testing at Fuji. Drivers were Jeff Krosnoff and Mauro Martini, who had come second in 1994, along with Marco Apicella, current Japanese F3000 champion. SARD also entered their own revision of the Toyota SW-20 series MR2. Like the Dauer previously, the SARD MC8-R was accepted for homologation with just a single road-car example. It was lengthened to accommodate a Lexus-Toyota 4.0-litre engine. With its twin-KKK turbos, it put out 600 bhp but its excessive weight and lack of development stymied performance. Former Toyota works driver Kenny Acheson was joined by Alain Ferté and Japanese female TV personality and racer Tomiko Yoshikawa.

Venturi had lost a number of its customer teams as they traded up to other cars. After 3 wins in the 1994 BPR series, the cars were quickly being left behind. This year there were only two teams running their two-year old 600LMs, and both were on the reserve list. BBA Compétition entered one alongside their McLaren (also decorated by César), while Éric Graham had his privateer car. Meanwhile, Venturi Compétition brought a new racing special, the 600S-LM, as a works entry and hoping to reignite interest in the brand. Méca Système built a chassis that was both stiffer and lighter, with a new aerodynamic shell that generated a lot more downforce. Meanwhile, EIA Moteurs worked on the 3.0-litre Peugeot-Renault V6 engine and upgraded the twin-turbos. The all-French driver-lineup comprised Jean-Marc Gounon, Paul Belmondo and Arnaud Trévisiol. Although both were 32, this was the first Le Mans for Gounon (who had just left Formula 1) while Belmondo had debuted ten years earlier.

Richard Piper's PC Automotive entered two Jaguar XJ220C. These particular cars had previously been raced here by TWR in 1993, when they were disqualified on a technicality. Purchased for the team to run in the BPR championship, TWR assisted with the tuning of the V6 twin-turbo engines to 600 bhp (with 38.9mm air-restrictors). However, Piper was disappointed not to have the support from Jaguar itself. For the first time in 6 years, Piper was not teamed with his regular co-driver, American Olindo Iacobelli. An experienced lineup was chosen for the race: Piper had veterans Tiff Needell and James Weaver in one, while Iacobelli was in the other car, and joined by Win Percy, in the same car he had driven with TWR two years earlier. Lister-Jaguars had raced at Le Mans in 1959 and 1963. The brand was reborn in the 1980s, making highly modified Jaguar specials. The Lister Storm was the new company's first original supercar, mounting a huge 7.0-litre V12 in the front. One of the road-cars was converted for Le Mans, with a steel rollcage, carbon/kevlar shell and steel brakes. The engine had a Zytek management-system and was tuned by TWR to put out 620 bhp (with 43.9mm restrictors). However, that power was compromised by being significantly heavier than its competition, at 1270 kg. Completed just in time for the pre-qualifying, Geoff Lees just missed out making the cut and the team were listed as first GT reserve. When other teams subsequently pulled out, the Lister moved up into the entry list. For the race he was joined by fellow-Brits Rupert Keegan and Olympic canoeist Dominic Chappell.

Doug Rippie built a range of high-performance Chevrolet Corvette specials and had a racing team in the Corvette Challenge series. He formed the non-profit ZR-1 Corvette Team USA supported by Corvette owners' clubs, to make a tilt at Le Mans. They were given an automatic entry by the ACO to encourage more American interest. Modifying two ZR-1 Corvette chassis, they fitted their tuned 6.3-litre LT5 V8 engine, generating 575 bhp with the 58.9mm air-restrictors. The team used the Sebring 12-hours as a shake-down test given their limited funds. Lead driver, John Paul Jr. was a former IMSA champion and had raced twice at Le Mans in the 1980s. The ZR-1 team was also racing for charity – aiming to raise a million dollars for the Muscular Dystrophy Association, in which a big portion was expected to come from selling the car after the race. Muscular Dystrophy.

=== LM GT2 ===
While Porsche was preparing its answer for GT1, it released the latest iteration of the Porsche 911 for the GT2 customer teams to replace the Carrera RSR, which was no longer fast enough to qualify. The 993 GT2 was dominating the class in the BPR series, by numbers and results. It now held the TAGtronic-controlled 3.6-litre twin-turbo, developed from the engine used in the 1993 works car, trimmed to 450 bhp with its 33.8mm restrictors. However, the GT2 regulations did provide problems – the mandatory flat floor meant the gearbox had to be centrally mounted, away from the engine in the rear which in turn meant a complete re-design of the cooling system. Six cars were on the grid: Stadler Motorsport had taken four of the seven class-wins in the BPR with drivers Enzo Calderari and Lilian Bryner. Other regular BPR teams included Seikel Motorsports, the Elf-Haberthur team and Eric van der Vyver's privateer car. The Kremer team prepared a car for Dirk-Reiner Ebeling's Heico Motorsports, and there was a one-off entry from Richard Jones.

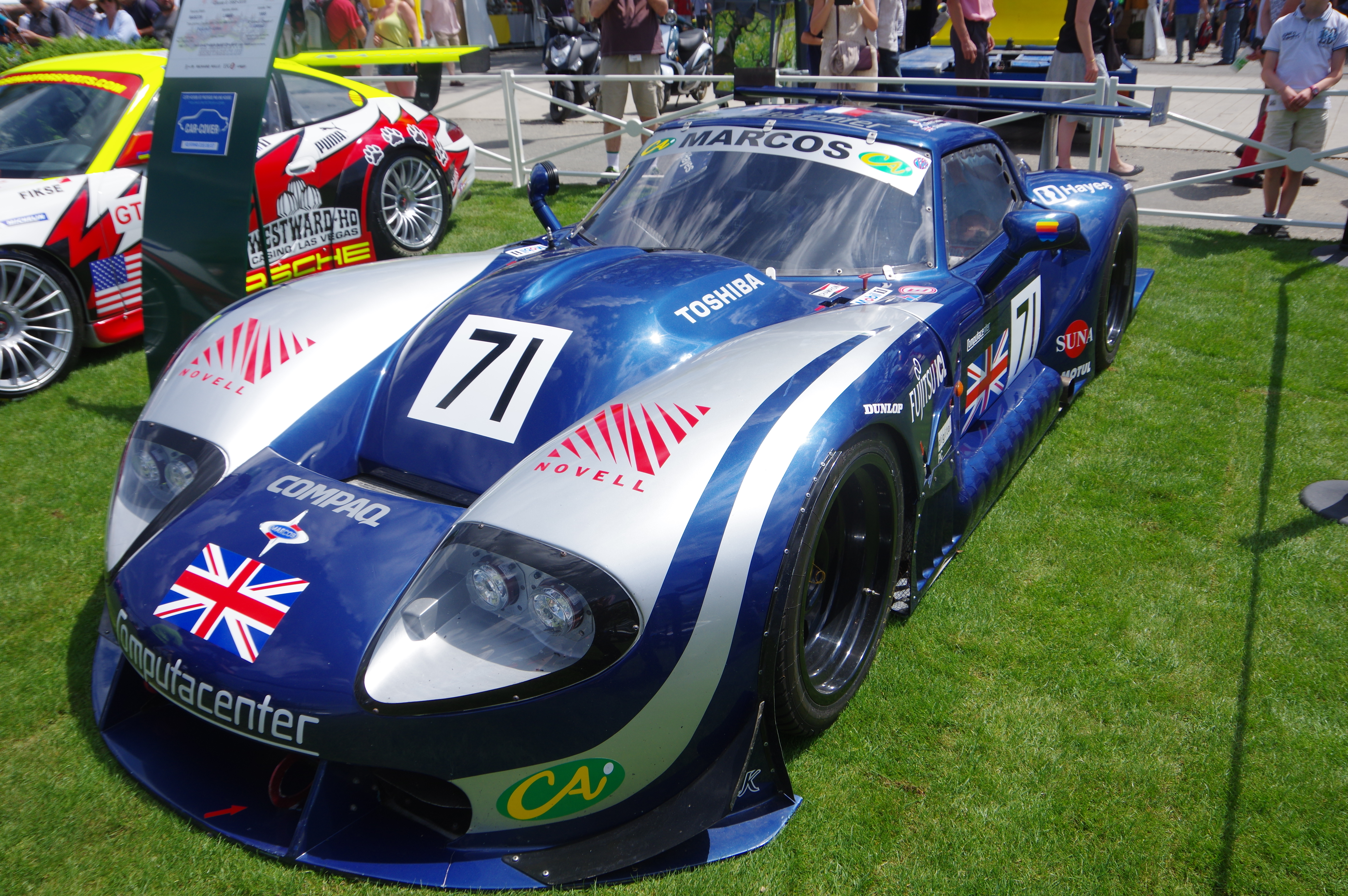
Marcos LM600

After a competitive race in 1994, Reeves Callaway built three of his SuperNatural Corvettes this year. Two he sold to "Rocky" Agusta and the other went to the subsidiary Calloway Schweiz team, all running in the BPR series. The cars were about 120 kg lighter and had further aerodynamic updates. The Callaway-tuned ZR-1 Chevrolet engine now put out 480 bhp. However, the Schweiz car was crashed heavily at the prequalifying, so Reeves brought a '94 car instead. Like the Nissans, the Agusta team fitted different gearboxes in their cars- a 6-speed ZF in one and the sequential X-Trac in the other. They also had the services of veteran Le Mans race engineer and strategist Keith Greene. As a benefit of the extra weight, Callaway was allowed to fit bigger air-restrictors than the Agusta cars (53.2mm vs 50.8mm) that gave a bit more power to compensate.

Kunimitsu Takahashi brought his team's Honda NSX back to Le Mans, and with the same driver-lineup. It retained the normally-aspirated 3.0-litre engine that, even under the GT2 regulations, could still put out a power-rate (390 bhp) quite similar to its bigger brother in GT1 of a similar weight. Team leader Takahashi was now well into his fifth decade of motor-racing. A new manufacturer in GT2 was the small English company of Marcos. Originally founded in 1959, it had run in three Le Mans before going into liquidation. Founder Jem Marsh resurrected the company in the 1980s and arrived at Le Mans with two new LM600 models, a development of the Marcos Mantara. A steel spaceframe and aluminium floor was covered with a curvaceous polyester bodywork. In the front was now a Chevrolet 6.3-litre 32-valve V8 that was limited to 530 bhp with the restrictors. Dutch Le Mans winner Jan Lammers had originally been slated as a driver, but limited funds instead meant Works driver Chris Hodgetts was racing in the British GT championship, and for Le Mans had Cor Euser and Thomas Erdos as co-drivers, while Chris Marsh, son of Jem, had the experience of David Leslie and François Migault (in his 22nd appearance).

== Practice and Qualifying ==
In the April Pre-qualifying, thirty WSC, LM-P2 and GT1 cars were grouped together to vie for seventeen places. In a separate session, fifteen GT2 cars raced off for nine spots. As mentioned, the two Courages topped the times. The second WR entry was third. Being a new manufacturer, McLaren had to pre-qualify but all six cars got through with ease. The fastest GTs though, were the Ferrari F40s of the Pilot Aldix and ENNEA teams. In GT2, the Agusta Callaway and the Kunimitsu Honda were fastest. The reserves were the Norma, Lister, and in GT2 the Miloé privateer Porsche and another Honda. Come race week, other withdrawals gave the Lister and Porsche reserves (now run by Larbre) entry with two weeks' notice. On Wednesday, the first day of practice, once again it was the Courages setting the fastest times. Overnight, the team set about changing from their own engines to new, factory-supplied ones, which involved a layout change for the turbos. The WSC Ferrari missed most of the session in an argument with the ACO about checking the maximum engine revs. Gonin's WR also missed the scrutineering when its transporter was held up on a Parisian motorway blocked from a traffic accident. In the night session, Stuck made an uncharacteristic error sending his Kremer into the chicane tyre-barriers after braking issues and doing heavy damage.

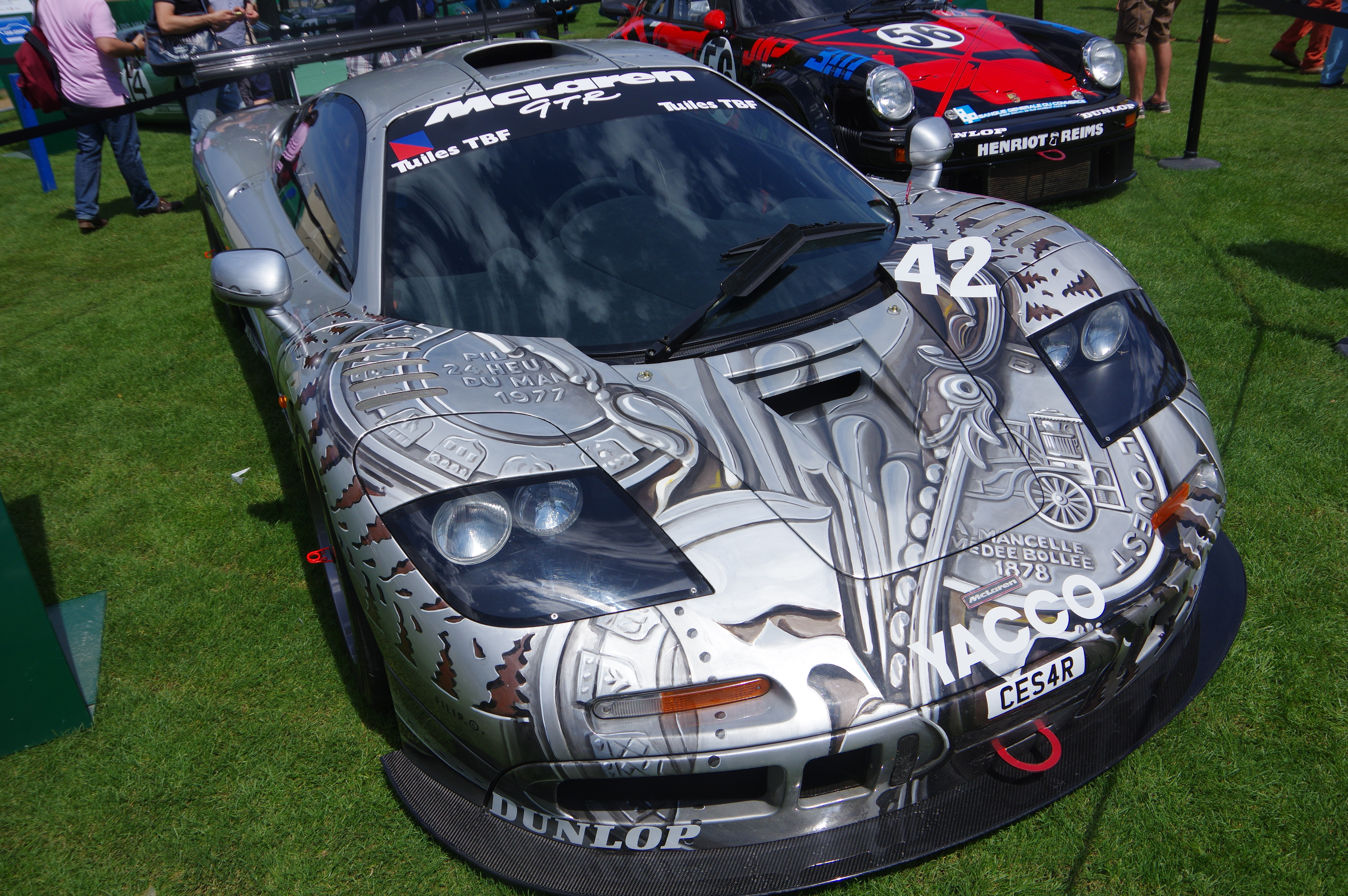
McLaren F1 GTR ‘art-car’ #42 of BBA Compétition

Thursday proved to be one of the greatest days at Le Mans for the WR team, rivalling its 400 km/h speed record on the Mulsanne straight in 1988. Early on, rookie William David put the field on notice with a 3:50 lap, then improved on it in the cooler night practice with a 3:46.1 to take the pole position. The best that Wollek could do was a 3:48.8 but at the very end of the session, Gonin put in 3:48.1 to lock down the front row for the little French team. David was the first rookie to take a Le Mans pole since the grid started being decided by lap time in 1963. Third had been van der Poele in the C41 Courage, with a 3:48.5 but in post-practice checks the car was disqualified for being 20 kg underweight. In a basic error, the team had forgotten to take account of the lighter weight of the new aluminium-block engine when changing it over. Teammate Lagorce was therefore bumped up to the second row with a 3:52.3. The lead Kremer was 5th, with a 3:55.1 by Boutsen. The three Ferrari F40s were next, heading the GT1 class. Their biggest drama was when Olofsson had a major accident when a tyre blew braking from full speed for the back straight chicanes. He was fortunate to be able to work away unscathed. Next on the grid was the best of the McLarens – the KK #59 car exactly two seconds slower. Tenth was the works Venturi, with Gounon being the first Venturi driver to lap La Sarthe in under 4 minutes (3:57.6), ahead of another five McLarens. After their scrutineering issues, the WSC Ferrari could only manage a 4:00.1 to be 17th, behind the other Kremer who had added to the team's panel-beating list when Konrad went off at Indianapolis. In GT2, Calderari had set the early pace on Wednesday with the Stadler Porsche with a 4:16. The next day Almo Coppelli set a 4:09.2 (23rd) early on after, an XTrac gearbox had been put into his Agusta Calloway. Calderari improved his time to 4:12.5 (33rd) to be second-quickest GT2, with the Kunimitsu Honda third with 4:15.6 (36th)

Elsewhere, the Japanese teams had a number of issues. The Mazda was stymied by its front end dragging, that limited them to 4:03.1 – the cause only remedied on the race-day morning warm-up. The GT1 Hondas had mixed fortunes – the normally-aspirated car was lapping 8 seconds faster than its GT2 last year, but the turbo car had gearbox issues that got worse and prevented any practice on Thursday. The team got special dispensation to run all six drivers to complete their mandatory hours in the good car. That was not an option unfortunately for the SARD team. Engine problems limited Tomiko Yoshikawa to just four sighting-laps before it failed and she failed to qualify. Left with just two pilots, drivetime limitations would mean the car would not be able to complete 24 hours. The Supra had severe brake problems but in the end the cars qualified within a second of each other (31st & 32nd). Nissan, too, had mechanical issues but a better Thursday saw them 6-7 secs faster (28th & 36th). The British teams chose a conservative practice strategy, focussing on race set-up. The Jaguars were midfield, a second apart, with the Lister between them (4:09.2 – 24th), while the Marcos cars were 8th and 9th in GT2. At the back of the grid was the Corvette that just managed to qualify despite an engine mostly running on six cylinders. Those that failed to qualify included the Norma, initially matching the pace of the Mazda, with Lacaud putting in a time to be 21st on the grid. Then both the engine, and the spare, blew on consecutive days not allowing the other two drivers to do any laps. The Tiga also failed to match the expectations of the pre-qualifying. Swapping to the race-engine, Masse missed a gearchange and over-revved the engine terminally.

== Race ==
=== Start ===
After a sunny week for practice, race-day was grey and overcast. The morning was the opportunity for a final shakedown after overnight repairs, but a number of cars had issues. Both the Lister and Chris Marsh's Marcos needed gearbox changes afterward, but they made the start. There were five cars that could not make the 3.35pm deadline to be on the dummy grid and had to start from the pitlane. Boutsen's Kremer had gear-selector problems and could not leave the grid, and the Mazda was still in the pits getting its new nose replaced. The Giroix McLaren completely missed the warm-up session, also suffering gear-selector problems while the engine of the Kunimitsu Honda caught fire during the warm-up. However, worst affected was the SARD which suffered clutch issues. A full change meant they missed the start, and it was almost 90 minutes into the race before the car did its first lap.

This was to be one of the wettest Le Mans on record, but at the start of the race the weather was clear. Honorary starter for the race was Philippe Séguin, president of the French National Assembly. At flagfall, WR team leader Gonin eased past to take the lead into the Dunlop Curve, with David slotting in behind. Bob Wollek, in the Courage stuck with them and took second place at the chicane on the back straight. Together these three started building a lead, up to 30 seconds by lap 4. Leading the pursuing pack was the West McLaren, with Dane John Nielsen roaring up from twelfth to fourth. He was duelling with Pescarolo in the other Courage. Another car on the move was the WSC Ferrari. After starting 17th, in 7 laps Massimo Sigala had quickly worked through the field up to third place. Then he abruptly pulled over at the Arnage corner – two pistons had burnt out after stone damage to the ignition system, and Ferrari's much-vaunted return to the top-category was over. Another foreboding event was the BBA McLaren coming in on lap 7 with major problems with their fragile gearbox.

Before the end of the first hour, the rain that would plague the race had arrived. It would continue through the night and until mid-morning. At the time, the WRs were back running 1–2, with Wollek close behind. In that time, Gonin had done what would be the fastest lap of the race (3:51.4). However, both spyders would soon be in the pits with oil-seal issues. Also in early trouble was the works Venturi which Gounon had run as high as fifth on the third lap, mixing it with the five British McLarens, until a water-hose came loose and cooked the engine, which cost over 3 hours to repair. The Corvette did only three laps until it stopped on-track overheating. Taking half an hour to get back to the pits, the crew spent the next 12 hours replacing all the cylinder heads. Hahne only got seven intermittent laps in the turbo Honda until it retired with a broken clutch in the third hour. As the rain soon got heavier, many cars were caught out on their slick tyres. The Haberthur Porsche had led the GT2 class at the first hour, running 15th overall, until Magueron went off at Indianapolis, smashing its radiator. Pascal Favre skated the remaining GT1 Honda into the guardrails and when the pit-crew examined it, found the whole front end needing replacing – an exercise that took 9 hours. The Kremers were proving diabolical to drive in the wet and lost several laps trying to fix the evil handling. It didn't help when Stuck spun, hitting a barrier on an out-lap, after not knowing the team had only put intermediate-tyres on, and not full-wets. Eventually, the crew raised the rear wing significantly and that seemed to greatly improve matters, to start the climb back up from 30th. Through all the chaos, it was the DPR McLarens running at the front, with Nielsen reeling off five shifts in a row in the first four hours despite a broken window-wiper in one, and Bell losing 12 minutes getting a broken throttle cable fixed in the other. The Gulf McLarens had been racing with them but then over the next 2 hours, Raphanel lost 2 laps with a puncture and then Bellm crashed in the Porsche Curves costing 45 minutes, and 7 laps, to repair. At dinnertime, in some of the heaviest rain, the Cougar-Chev ground to a halt coming out of Arnage. The engineers, suspecting it was the fuel-pump, suggested to Lagorce to push the car to reprime it.

But then in the evening, while rushing to make up time, Gonin was caught out offline overtaking another car at the Mulsanne kink. Aquaplaning, he smacked the barrier and was somersaulted at high speed. The race was quickly neutralised with safety cars as the crash crews worked to release the driver. Although the rollbar was compressed by 3 cm, it saved the driver. Gonin was taken to hospital conscious, with a broken shoulder-blade, four broken ribs and bruising. After 37 minutes, the safety cars were withdrawn and the race resumed. During that time, Lagorce had been allowed to keep pushing his Cougar for a kilometre but with the circuit going live his efforts had to come to an end. Beyond this point the McLarens were, mechanically, going into unknown territory yet all seven were still running. Shortly before 8pm, Mario Andretti was chasing Mass through the Porsche Curves when he went offline to lap Herrmann in the Kremer tiptoeing through the wet. Spinning, he rolled back into the barrier, wrecking the wing and knocking the rear suspension. The Courage team lost 30 minutes before Hélary rejoined the race, 6 laps down. This left the McLarens running 1-2-3 on the same lap, with Mass in the DPR West car, ahead of Alliot in the Gulf and Derek Bell in the DPR Harrods cars, swapping places as their pit-stops rotated. Fourth was the Larbre Porsche Evo ahead of the KK McLaren. In GT2, it was the Kremer-Heico (8th) and Stadler Porsches had a 2-lap lead over the Agusta Callaways. Cor Euser was using his drifting experience to push hard in the wet, moving the Marcos up to fifth in class, lapping faster than many GT1s.

Derek Bell, commenting on the McLaren's performance:

"It's the most amazing feeling. You have to concentrate for every split second: you can't even think about the car ahead. As you take sixth on the straight, the tail moves out – which is unbelievable – and it does it regularly. Even when the car is straight, it kind of gets a whip on and wants to come round on you - that's because the engine has so much torque. The fronts kept locking up and pushing me past the corner. The tickover of the engine was too high for the speeds I wanted to go into a corner like Arnage."

In the heavy rain, the WSC cars lost their power advantage and dropped down the field. At 9pm, as a drizzly, grey evening got darker, the highest placed WSC was the Lässig/Konrad/Herrmann Kremer in 11th. An excellent stint by Needell had got the Jaguar into 6th, after starting from 22nd on the grid. The team was running on lower boost for better reliability and they were ahead of the Heico GT2 Porsche and the second Larbre Evo. Terrific driving from Toshio Suzuki had got his Nissan Skyline up to 9th overall mid-evening and was up to 7th when the car's gearbox broke at 11pm, costing an hour to replace. When the second gearbox broke twelve hours later and the car had to be retired.

=== Night ===
As night fell, Alliot had got the Gulf McLaren into the lead when he got punted off the track by a GT2 Porsche missing his braking behind Alliot's spray. It also saw the two leading Porsches retired – Pareja aquaplaned the 4th-placed Larbre Evo off at the Porsche Curves and then Saldaña did the same with the GT2-leading Heico Porsche. There was further bad luck for the Larbre team just before midnight when Collard (also now up to 4th overall) was hit from behind at the Mulsanne corner by the GT2-leading Stadler Porsche (in 6th) when Andreas Fuchs misjudged his braking. Both cars were put out of the race.

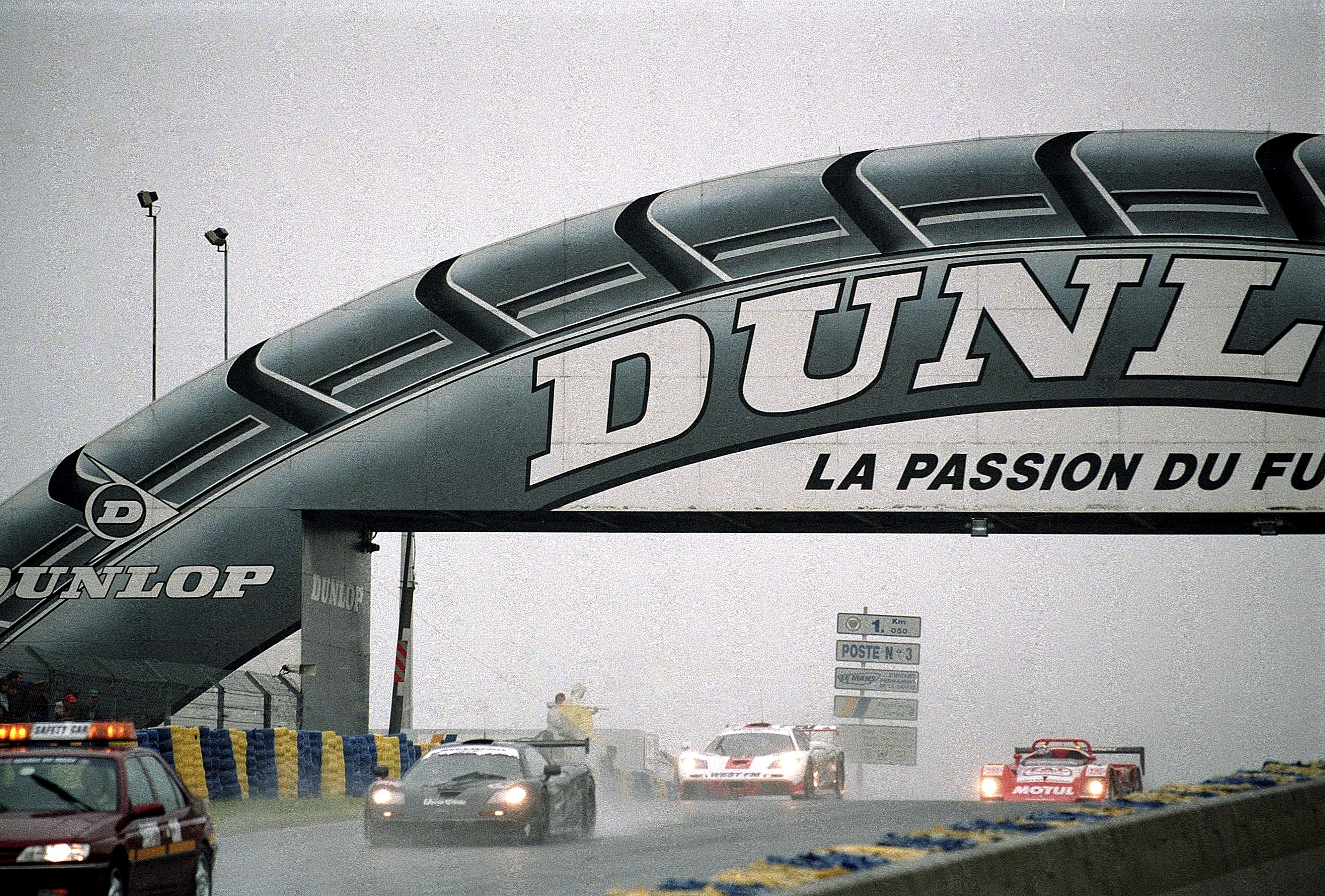
McLaren #59 behind a pace-car, ahead of the West McLaren #49 and Kremer #4

So, as the race went into Sunday, the field was well mixed up. The two DPR McLarens were still out in front, with a lap on the Kokusai McLaren. Several laps back were Piper's Jaguar and the Jacadi McLaren, along with the suffering Kremers and the recovering Courage. The second Jaguar was not far behind in ninth chased by the Gulf McLaren. The latter was being driven very hard by Blundell and Sala, after falling down to 35th making back 2 of the 8 laps on the leaders. After earlier suspension issues, the pole-sitting WR had moved back up from 30th to 12th ahead of the Kondo/Fukuyama Nissan (after the other Nissan's gearbox issues dropped that out the top 10). With the demise of the Porsches, the GT2 race was now between the three Callaways (that became two when Thyrring crashed the second Agusta car at the first Mulsanne chicane at 1am) and the private Porsche of Jean-François Veroux that started second to last, but now only a lap behind. Just after midnight, the works Venturi came back onto the track after over 6 hours in the pits with engine repairs, having only done 15 laps to date. Yet it was not last – with the SARD and Corvette both behind it and still in the pits.

Through the night, the atrocious conditions continued to claim more casualties. At 3am, Mass had nearly a lap's lead when he pitted with the feared broken clutch. It took the DPR crew 70 minutes to replace it, only for Nielsen to then run off the track on his out-lap with cold brakes. At the halfway point, the "Harrods" McLaren was still a lap ahead of the Kokusai car. Between them, Andy Wallace, Derek Bell and especially JJ Lehto put in some incredible stints in the rain - some of it on slick tyres - and were pulling away from the rest of the field. The only exception was the Wollek/Andretti/Hélary Courage that had now hauled itself up to third by pulling back 2 of the 6-lap deficit. The Jacadi and Gulf McLarens were next. The Jaguar challenge was about to expire – the Percy car had been retired after he slid off in the Porsche Curves and just before 5am, the other one broke its crankshaft when Weaver was running 6th. In GT2, it was now a race between the remaining two Callaways (in 12th and 13th), being hounded by the rapidly-closing Kunimitsu Honda which had run like clockwork after losing 6 laps at the start when the exhaust system had to be replaced. Together the three had now put 5 laps between themselves and the chasing Porsches.

=== Morning ===
As a soggy, grey dawn broke, the front of the field settled down. The rain finally eased and the three remaining WSC cars could finally start stretching their legs on the drying track. The Courage was very fast, pulling back another lap on the McLarens, and the Mazda was up to 7th behind the Kremer. Through the morning, Lehto was putting in more quick laps, hauling in the less experienced Justin Bell, often trimming 10 seconds a lap. They were soon close enough to swap places during the pit-stop sequence. But then strong shifts by Wallace and Derek Bell, in turn, pulled out their lead again.

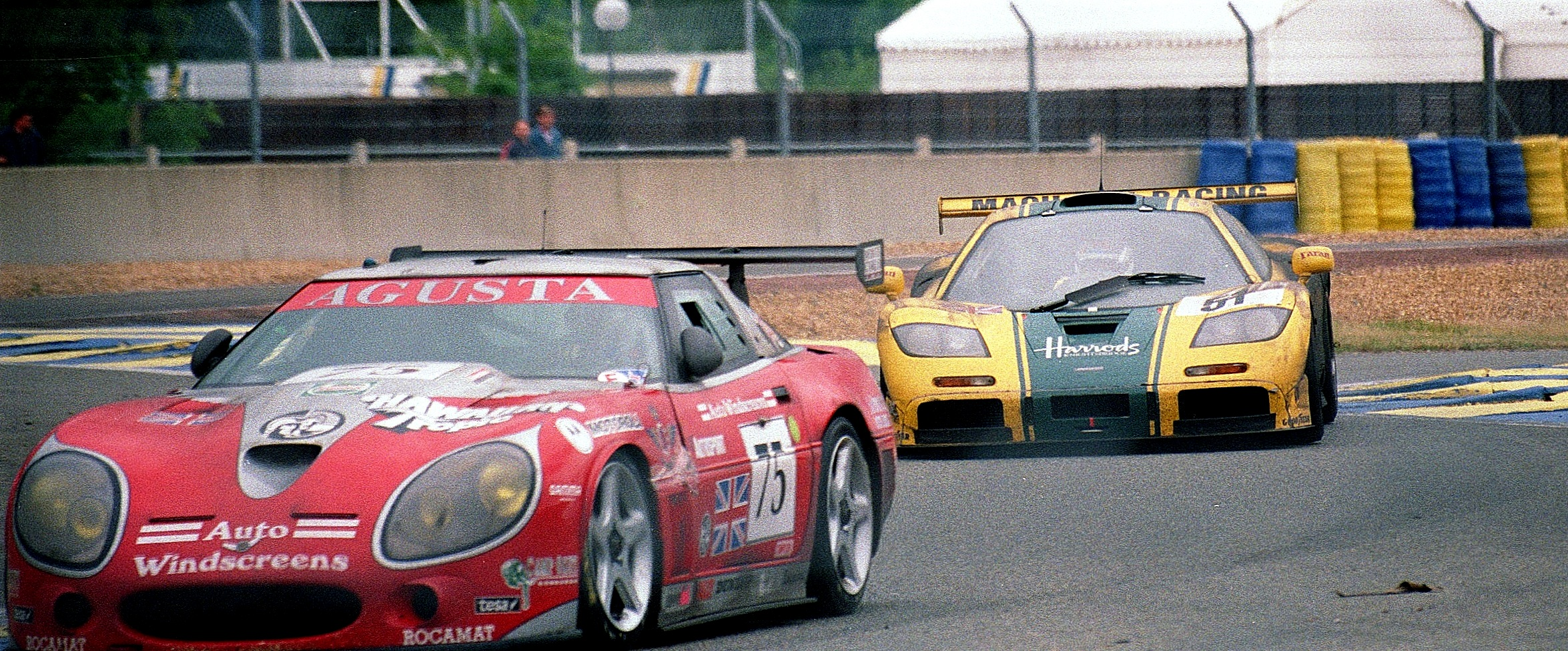
Agusta Callaway leading McLaren #51 through the Ford Chicane

At the other end of the field, the Corvette finally got back to the track at 7am, after spending 13 hours in the pits getting its engine rebuilt. Over the next hour it did 12 laps – as good as any other GT1, to lift its average race speed to 14 km/h. Between these extremes, in GT2 it was still a three-way tussle for the Callaways and the Honda, all on the same lap. Gradually though, with its better fuel economy, the Honda inched further ahead and by lunchtime it had whole lap's lead. After earlier delays, the remaining WR had come back up the field to sit 13th, but at 9:45 it pulled up at Indianapolis with a broken fuel pump. It had a 25-lap lead over the Debora, which would take another 4 hours to overtake it for the LMP2 lead. Although finishing 20th, and last classified car, as the only P2 finisher the Debora took the class win.

The rain finally stopped late in the morning, to everyone's relief and after midday, with the track now dry, lap-times got back under 4 minutes. Overshadowed by the McLarens, all the Ferrari F40s had had troubled races after promising so much. However, Stéphane Ratel's Pilot Racing Ferrari had been holding 8th position since dawn. They had been delayed by a puncture on Saturday evening and come back up through the field. But at 11.30 Michel Ferté skated on gravel left when Blundell's Gulf McLaren went off at the Dunlop curves, beaching it in the gravel trap. Pulling him out took 5 minutes and three places. Then two hours later, another puncture on the Hunaudières cost Thévenin half an hour to get back to the pits and another place. And that twelfth place was where they eventually finished.

=== Finish and post-race ===
At 1pm, with 3 hours to go, the two leading McLarens were now nursing fragile slipping clutches, that made gear-changes difficult. Pressure was building on the leading Harrods car, with the Kokusai McLaren getting onto the same lap, and when Derek Bell spun at the Dunlop chicane when unable to find a gear, his lead shrunk to less than a minute. The Courage was now only two laps behind in third, with Andretti closing in at 15 seconds a lap, promising another tense finish. These, in turn, had a four-lap gap over the rest of the field.

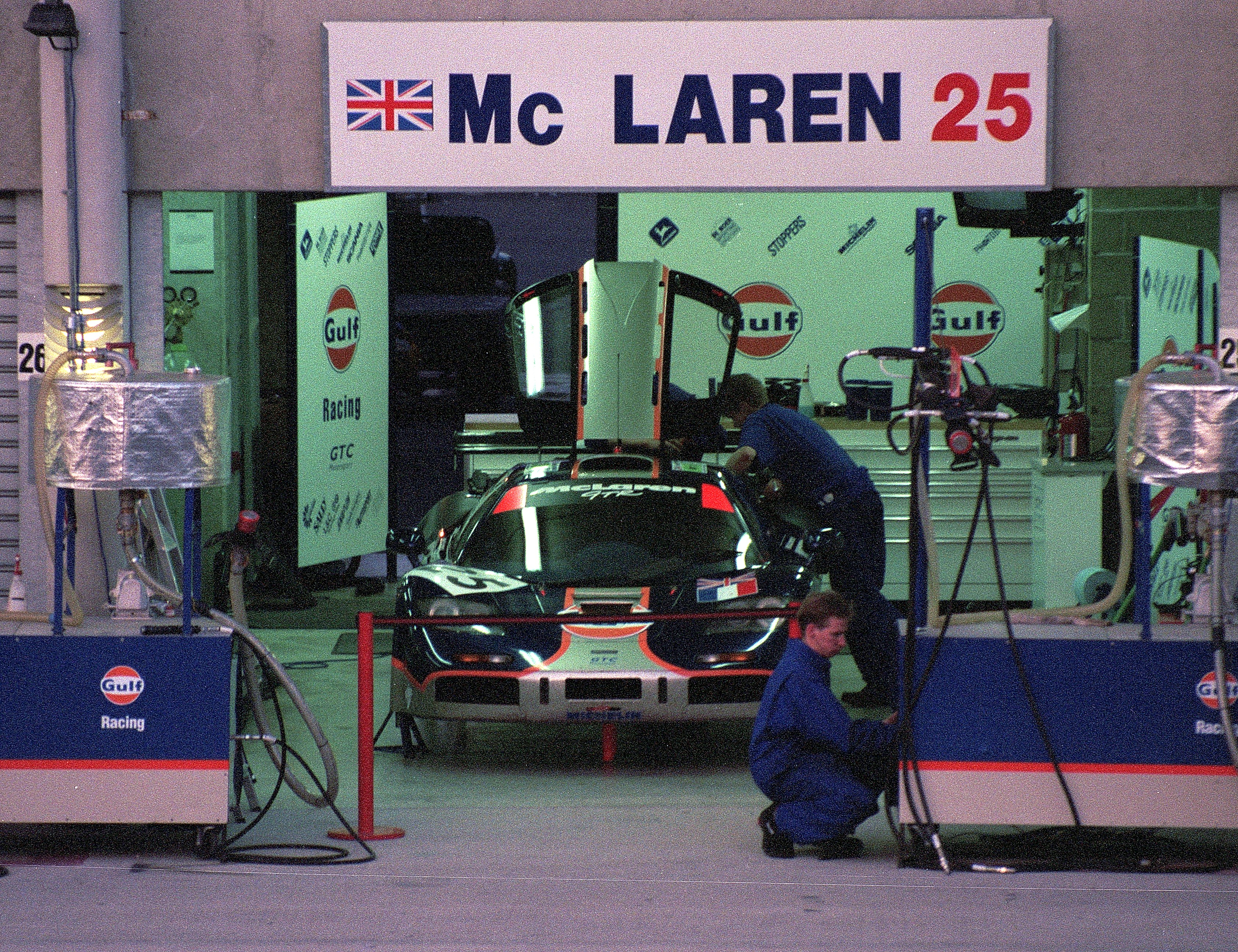
Gulf Racing McLaren in its pit

The penultimate pitstop for DPR turned into a problem when gear-selection stopped Wallace getting away, making a routine 2-minute stop instead take 5 minutes, and at 2.05pm Dalmas swept past into the lead. Wollek caught the ailing Harrods McLaren at 3.10pm and two minutes later unlapped himself from Dalmas to put the Courage on the same lap. With a half-hour left, at their final stops, both cars spent 38-seconds in the pits just topping up with fuel. Wollek was 3:45 minutes behind and set out in pursuit, but without new tyres could not close the gap quickly enough. Dalmas held on to take the chequered flag with Wollek three minutes behind. Wallace nursed the DPR McLaren home a lap further back, five laps ahead of the Gulf McLaren and Jacadi car (running its alternative fuel), and the remaining two WSC cars: the Kremer-Porsche and Kudzu-Mazda behind them.

The rest of the field was well strung out: Eighth, and seven laps further back, was the Kunimitsu Honda winning the GT2 class. Despite starting from the pitlane and having an early 6-lap delay in the pits, it won its class by a two-lap margin. The contest against the Callaways had been tight but was decided when the works car had a late problem and the Agusta car needed three stops in the last hour to fix a loose bonnet. Michel Ligonnet had parked up the Freisinger Porsche for the last half-hour on the Mulsanne Straight and fired it up to creep around and complete a final lap, dropping only one place (to the surviving ENNEA Ferrari), finishing 19th. Three cars were running at the end but not classified, for failing to cover at least 70% of their class-winner's distance. One Marcos had stopped on track before midnight with a broken universal joint. The other had already been stranded on the circuit for three hours with electrical issues until Migault could fashion a rudimentary repair to get back to the pits. Although it ran well after that, it was too far behind to make up the distance. The works Venturi had a litany of issues giving constant delays and set-backs. Finally, after spending the 9 hours in the pits, the GT1 Honda was never going to be able to complete enough laps, but aside from a niggly oil leak, it had run well for the rest of the race.

This was McLaren's first win at Le Mans, at its first attempt - Ferrari had accomplished the same feat with its two cars in 1949, but other manufacturers like Jaguar, Porsche, Ford or Audi achieved their first Le Mans win only after 2, 3 or more attempts. As well as its outright win, the dominance of the F1 GTR in the race was underlined by it leading for all bar 13 laps and, ultimately, filling four of the first five places. It mirrored the advent of the Porsche 956 in 1982 with their 1-2-3 result although the McLarens were not part of a works team. However, the average race speed of the winner - 168.99 km/h, was the lowest since the Flockhart/Sanderson Jaguar back in 1956.Graham Humphrys (former Spice technical director), who engineered the race winning car, attributed the win to the rain which fell on the circuit overnight, which eased the stress on the car's relatively fragile transmission. He was also able to identify the source of the gear selection problems the McLarens suffered from, working out that the exposed gear-linkage mechanism was filling with water and dirt from the wet conditions, and solving the problem by filling area with WD-40 at every pit stop. Yannick Dalmas continued his remarkable Le Mans run. From his four starts, he now had three victories and a second. JJ Lehto was the first Finnish winner and Masanori Sekiya, at his 9th attempt, became the first Japanese winner. For Courage, second was the best result achieved by the small French company, but they were left with a sense of the "one that got away" after dropping the six laps early on. Despite their failure at Le Mans, Thomas Bscher and John Nielsen and their DPR McLaren won the BPR Championship with a consistent series despite only two victories. In second place, with six GT2 class victories, and high placings overall was the Stadler Motorsport team of Enzo Calderari and Lilian Bryner. Over in the IMSA series, although the Dyson Racing Riley & Scott Mk III won five races, the Ferrari 333P won the Makes title with better combined results from the two customer teams. With ever more teams preparing cars for GT1, and using GT2 in the meantime, as well as new WSC cars, it boded well for the rebirth of endurance racing.

== Official results ==
=== Finishers ===
Results taken from Quentin Spurring's book, officially licensed by the ACO
Class Winners are in Bold text.

Pos	Class	No.	Team	Drivers	Chassis	Engine	Tyre	Laps
1	**LM-GT1**	**59**	**(United Kingdom) Lanzante Motorsport** **(Japan) Kokusai Kaihatsu UK**	**(France) Yannick Dalmas** **(Finland) JJ Lehto** **(Japan) Masanori Sekiya**	McLaren F1 GTR	BMW S70/2 6.1L V12	M	298
2	**LM-WSC**	**13**	**(France) Courage Compétition**	**(France) Bob Wollek** **(United States) Mario Andretti** **(France) Éric Hélary**	Courage C34	Porsche 935/82 3.0L F6 twin turbo	M	297
3	LM-GT1	51	(United Kingdom) David Price Racing; Mach One Racing	(United Kingdom) Andy Wallace (United Kingdom) Derek Bell (United Kingdom) Justin Bell	McLaren F1 GTR	BMW S70/2 6.1L V12	G	296
4	LM-GT1*	24	(United Kingdom) GTC Gulf Racing	(United Kingdom) Mark Blundell (United Kingdom) Ray Bellm (Brazil) Maurizio Sandro Sala	McLaren F1 GTR	BMW S70/2 6.1L V12	M	291
5	LM-GT1	50	(France) Giroix Racing Team Jacadi	(France) Fabien Giroix (Switzerland) Jean-Denis Délétraz (France) Olivier Grouillard	McLaren F1 GTR	BMW S70/2 6.1L V12	M	290
6	LM-WSC	4	(Germany) Kremer Racing	(Germany) Hans-Joachim Stuck (Belgium) Thierry Boutsen (France) Christophe Bouchut	Kremer K8	Porsche 935/76 3.0L F6 twin turbo	G	289
7	LM-WSC*	5	(United States) Downing/Terada Racing (Japan) Mazdaspeed	(United States) Jim Downing (Japan) Yojiro Terada (France) Franck Fréon	Kudzu DG-2/3	Mazda R20B 2.0L triple-rotor	G	282
8	**LM-GT2**	**84**	**(Japan) Team Kunimitsu Honda**	**(Japan) Kunimitsu Takahashi** **(Japan) Keiichi Tsuchiya** **(Japan) Akira Iida**	Honda NSX GT	Honda RX-306E5-IT 3.0L V6	Y	275
9	LM-GT2*	73	(United States) Callaway Competition	(Germany) Frank Jelinski (Italy) Enrico Bertaggia (United States) Johnny Unser	Callaway Corvette; Super Natural	Chevrolet LT1 6.2L V8	BF	273
10	LM-GT1*	22	(Japan) NISMO	(Japan) Hideo Fukuyama (Japan) Masahiko Kondo (Japan) Shunji Kasuya	Nissan Skyline GT-R LM	Nissan RB26-DETT 2.6L S6 twin turbo	B	271
11	LM-GT2	75	(United Kingdom) / (Italy) Agusta Racing Team	(Italy) Riccardo "Rocky" Agusta (United Kingdom) Robin Donovan (United Kingdom) Eugene O'Brien	Callaway Corvette; Super Natural	Chevrolet LT1 6.2L V8	D	271
12	LM-GT1	34	(France) Pilot Aldix Racing	(France) Michel Ferté (France) Olivier Thévenin (Spain) Carlos Palau	Ferrari F40 LM	Ferrari F120B 2.9L V8 twin turbo	M	270
13	LM-GT1	42	(France) BBA Compétition	(France) Jean-Luc Maury-Laribière (France) Marc Sourd (France) Hervé Poulain	McLaren F1 GTR	BMW S70/2 6.1L V12	D	266
14	LM-GT1*	27	(Japan) SARD Company	(United States) Jeff Krosnoff (Italy) Marco Apicella (Italy) Mauro Martini	Toyota Supra GT-LM	Toyota 3S-GTE 2.1L S4 turbo	D	264
15	LM-GT2	77	(Germany) Seikel Motorsport (private entrant)	(Germany) Peter Seikel (France) Guy Kuster (Czech Republic) Karel Dolejší	Porsche 911 GT2	Porsche M64/81 3.6L F6 twin turbo	P	263
16	LM-GT2	78	(France) J.-F. Veroux (private entrant)	(France) Jean-François Veroux (France) Eric van de Vyver (France) Didier Ortion	Porsche 911 GT2	Porsche M64/81 3.6L F6 twin turbo	G	262
17	LM-GT2	81	(United Kingdom) R. Jones (private entrant)	(United Kingdom) Richard Jones (United Kingdom) Nick Adams (United Kingdom) Gerard MacQuillan	Porsche 911 GT2	Porsche M64/81 3.6L F6 twin turbo	G	250
18	LM-GT1	41	(Italy) ENNEA Ferrari Club Italia	(United Kingdom) Gary Ayles (Italy) Massimo Monti (Italy) Fabio Mancini	Ferrari F40 GTE	Ferrari F120B 3.0L V8 twin turbo	P	237
19	LM-GT1	54	(Germany) Freisinger Motorsport	(Germany) Wolfgang Kaufmann (Japan) Yukihiro Hane (France) Michel Ligonnet	Porsche 911 BiTurbo	Porsche 3.8L F6 twin turbo	G	229
20	**LM-P2***	**14**	**(France) Didier Bonnet**	**(Switzerland) Bernard Santal** **(France) Patrice Roussel** **(France) Edouard Sezionale**	Debora LMP295	Cosworth BDG 2.0L S4 turbo	M	222
N/C**	LM-GT1*	44	(France) Société Venturi S.A.	(France) Jean-Marc Gounon (France) Paul Belmondo (France) Arnaud Trévisiol	Venturi 600S-LM	Renault PRV 3.0L V6 twin turbo	M	193
N/C**	LM-GT2	71	(United Kingdom) Team Marcos	(United Kingdom) David Leslie (United Kingdom) Chris Marsh (France) François Migault	Marcos LM600	Chevrolet LT5 6.2L V8	D	184
N/C**	LM-GT1*	46	(Japan) Honda Racing Team (United Kingdom) TC Prototypes	(Japan) Hideki Okada (Japan) Naoki Hattori (Switzerland) Philippe Favre	Honda NSX GT1	Honda RX-306ES 3.0L V6	D	121

- Note *: one of the twenty "Automatic Entries" awarded by the ACO.
- Note **: Not Classified for failing to cover sufficient distance (70% of their class-winner) by the race's end.

=== Did not finish ===
Pos	Class	No	Team	Drivers	Chassis	Engine	Tyre	Laps	Reason
DNF	LM-P2	9	(France) Welter Racing	(France) William David (France) Jean-Bernard Bouvet (France) Richard Balandras	WR LM94/5	Peugeot 405-Raid 1.9L S4 turbo	M	196	Engine (20hr)
DNF	LM-GT1	45 reserve	(France) É. Graham (private entrant)	(France) Éric Graham (France) François Birbeau (France) Ferdinand de Lesseps	Venturi 600 LM	Renault PRV 3.0L V6 twin turbo	D	178	Electrics (21hr)
DNF	LM-WSC*	3	(Germany) Kremer Racing	(Germany) Jürgen Lässig (Austria) Franz Konrad (Brazil) Antonio de Azevedo Herrmann	Kremer K8	Porsche 935/76 3.0L F6 twin turbo	G	163	Electrics (18hr)
DNF	LM-GT1*	23	(Japan) NISMO	(Japan) Kazuyoshi Hoshino (Japan) Toshio Suzuki (Japan) Masahiko Kageyama	Nissan Skyline GT-R LM	Nissan RB26-DETT 2.6L S6 twin turbo	B	157	Gearbox (19hr)
DNF	LM-GT1	57	(United Kingdom) PC Automotive Jaguar	(United Kingdom) Richard Piper (United Kingdom) Tiff Needell (United Kingdom) James Weaver	Jaguar XJ220C	Jaguar JV6 3.5L V6 twin turbo	D	135	Engine (13hr)
DNF	LM-GT2*	70	(United Kingdom) Team Marcos	(United Kingdom) Chris Hodgetts (Brazil) Thomas Erdos (Netherlands) Cor Euser	Marcos LM600	Chevrolet LT5 6.2L V8	D	133	Transmission (21hr)
DNF	LM-GT1	49	(United Kingdom) David Price Racing; West Competition	(Germany) Dr Thomas Bscher (Denmark) John Nielsen (Germany) Jochen Mass	McLaren F1 GTR	BMW S70/2 6.1L V12	G	131	Clutch (13hr)
DNF	LM-GT1	43 reserve	(France) BBA Compétition	(France) Emmanuel Clerico (France) Laurent Lécuyer (France) Bernard Chauvin	Venturi 600 LM	Renault PRV 3.0L V6 twin turbo	D	130	Fire (15hr)
DNF	LM-GT1	58	(United Kingdom) PC Automotive Jaguar	(United Kingdom) Win Percy (Switzerland) Bernard Thuner (France) / (United States) Olindo Iacobelli	Jaguar XJ220C	Jaguar JV6 3.5L V6 twin turbo	D	123	Accident (16hr)
DNF	LM-GT2	76	(United Kingdom) / (Italy) Agusta Racing Team	(Denmark) Thorkild Thyrring (Italy) Almo Coppelli (France) Patrick Bourdais	Callaway Corvette; Super Natural	Chevrolet LT1 6.2L V8	D	96	Accident (11hr)
DNF	LM-GT1*	37	(France) Larbre Compétition	(France) Dominique Dupuy (France) Emmanuel Collard (Monaco) Stéphane Ortelli	Porsche 911 GT2 Evo	Porsche M64/83 3.6L F6 twin turbo	M	82	Accident (9hr)
DNF	LM-GT2	79	(Switzerland) Stadler Motorsport	(Switzerland) Enzo Calderari (Switzerland) Lilian Bryner (Germany) Andreas Fuchs	Porsche 911 GT2	Porsche M64/81 3.6L F6 twin turbo	P	81	Accident (9hr)
DNF	LM-GT1	25	(United Kingdom) GTC Gulf Racing	(France) Pierre-Henri Raphanel (France) Philippe Alliot (United Kingdom) Lindsay Owen-Jones	McLaren F1 GTR	BMW S70/2 6.1L V12	M	77	Accident (8hr)
DNF	LM-GT1	36	(France) Larbre Compétition	(France) Jean-Pierre Jarier (France) Érik Comas (Spain) Jesús Pareja	Porsche 911 GT2 Evo	Porsche M64/83 3.6L F6 twin turbo	M	64	Accident (6hr)
DNF	LM-GT2	91	(Germany) Heico Service (private entrant) (Germany) Kremer Racing	(Spain) Tomás Saldaña (Spain) Miguel Ángel de Castro (Spain) Prince Alfonso de Orléans-Borbón	Porsche 911 GT2	Porsche M64/81 3.6L F6 twin turbo	G	63	Accident (7hr)
DNF	LM-GT1*	30	(United States) ZR-1 Corvette Team USA (private entrant)	(United States) John Paul Jr. (Canada) Chris McDougall (United States) James Meras	Chevrolet Corvette ZR-1	Chevrolet LT5 DRZ-500; 6.2L V8	G	57	Engine (22hr)
DNF	LM-GT1	40	(Italy) ENNEA Ferrari Club Italia	(Italy) Luciano Della Noce (Sweden) Anders Olofsson (Japan) Tetsuya Ota	Ferrari F40 GTE	Ferrari F120B 3.0L V8 twin turbo	P	42	Gearbox (7hr)
DNF	LM-GT1	52	(United Kingdom) Lister Cars	(United Kingdom) Geoff Lees (United Kingdom) Rupert Keegan (United Kingdom) Dominic Chappell	Lister Storm GTS	Jaguar HE 7.0L V12	M	40	Clutch (6hr)
DNF	LM-GT1	55 reserve	(France) Larbre Compétition (France) J.-C. Miloé (private entrant)	(France) Jack Leconte (France) Pierre Yver (France) Jean-Luc Chéreau	Porsche 911 GT2 Evo	Porsche M64/81 3.6L F6 twin turbo	M	40	Accident (8hr)
DNF	LM-P2*	8	(France) Welter Racing	(France) Patrick Gonin (France) Pierre Petit (France) Marc Rostan	WR LM94	Peugeot 405-Raid 1.9L S4 turbo	M	33	Accident (5hr)
DNF	LM-WSC*	11	(France) Courage Compétition	(France) Henri Pescarolo (France) Franck Lagorce (France) Éric Bernard	Courage C41	Chevrolet 5.0L V8	G	26	Electrics (4hr)
DNF	LM-GT1*	26	(Japan) SARD Company	(France) Alain Ferté (United Kingdom) Kenny Acheson	SARD MC8-R	Lexus R40V-T 4.0L V8 twin turbo	D	14	Clutch (13hr)
DNF	LM-GT2	82	(Switzerland) Elf Haberthur Racing	(Switzerland) Charles Margueron (France) Pierre de Thoisy (Switzerland) Philippe Siffert	Porsche 911 GT2	Porsche M64/81 3.6L F6 twin turbo	P	13	Accident (5hr)
DNF	LM-WSC*	1	(United States) Euromotorsport Racing	(Italy) Massimo Sigala (United States) Jay Cochran (France) René Arnoux	Ferrari 333 SP	Ferrari F130E 4.0L V12	G	7	Electrics (3hr)
DNF	LM-GT1*	47	(Japan) Honda Racing Team (United Kingdom) TC Prototypes	(Germany) Armin Hahne (Italy) Ivan Capelli (Belgium) Bertrand Gachot	Honda NSX GT1	Honda RX-306ES 3.0L V6 twin-turbo	D	7	Clutch (3hr)

=== Did not start ===
Pos	Class	No	Team	Drivers	Chassis	Engine	Tyre	Reason
DSQ	LM-WSC	12	(France) Courage Compétition	(Belgium) Eric van der Poele (France) Olivier Beretta (Slovenia) Matjaz Tomlje	Courage C41	Chevrolet 5.0L V8	**G**	Failed scrutineering (Underweight)
DNQ	LM-WSC	6	(France) N. Santos	(France) Dominique Lacaud (France) Jean-Paul Libert (France) Pascal Dro	Norma M14	Buick L27 4.5L V6	**G**	Engine
DNQ	LM-WSC	7	(France) S. Boulay (private entrant)	(Canada) John Jones (France) Jean-Marc Massé (France) François Provost	Tiga FJ94	Buick L27 4.5L V6	**G**	Engine
Res	LM-GT2	88	(France) Yellow Racing (private entrant)	(France) Christian Heinkélé (France) Lucien Guitteny (France) François O'Born	Ferrari 348 GT Competizione	Ferrari Tipo F129B; 3.5L V12	**M**	Reserve Entry
DNA	LM-P2	16	(Czech Republic) Vonka Racing Team (private entrant)	(Czech Republic) Jan Vonka (Czech Republic) Dan Nowotný	PRC S94	BMW M88 3.0L S6		Did not arrive
DNA	LM-GT1	28	(Japan) Nisso Trust Racing Team	(Sweden) Steven Andskär (South Africa) George Fouché (Sweden) Thomas Danielsson	Toyota Supra GT-LM	Toyota 3S-GTE 2.1L S4 turbo	**D**	Did not arrive
DNA	LM-GT1	31	(Italy) AIM Team Lamborghini	(United Kingdom) Rupert Keegan (United Kingdom) Sir Harry Nuttall	Lamborghini Diablo Jota GT1 LM	Lamborghini 5.7L V12		Did not arrive

=== Class winners ===
Class	Winning car	Winning drivers
LM-WSC	#13 Courage C34	Wollek / Andretti / Hélery *
LM-P2	#14 Debora LMP295	Santal / Roussel / Sezionale *
LM-GT1	#59 McLaren F1 GTR	Dalmas / Lehto / Sekiya
LM-GT2	#84 Honda NSX GT	Takahashi / Tsuchiya / Iida
Note *: setting a new class distance record..

== Statistics ==
Taken from Quentin Spurring's book, officially licensed by the ACO

- Pole Position – W. David, #9 WR LM94/5 - 3:46.1; 216.6 km/h (134.6 mph)
- Fastest Lap – P. Gonin, #8 WR LM95 ; 211.6 km/h (131.5 mph)
- Winning Distance – 4,055.8 km (2,520.2 mi)
- Winner's Average Speed – 169.0 km/h (105.0 mph)
- Attendance – 168000, >160000
