= Chris McDougall =

Australian skydiver (born 1976)

Chris "Douggs" McDougall
Personal information
- Full name: Christopher John McDougall
- Nickname: Douggs
- Nationality: Australian
- Born: 17 April 1976 (age 50) Melbourne
- Occupations: Keynote speaker, professional skydiver, BASE jumper, wingsuit pilot
- Years active: 25
- Height: 183 cm (6 ft 0 in)
- Weight: 75 kg (165 lb)
- Website: www.douggs.com / www.learntobasejump.com

Sport
- Country: Switzerland
- Sport: Skydiving Wingsuit flying BASE jumping

Chris "Douggs" McDougall (born 17 April 1976) is an Australian skydiver, BASE jumper and wingsuit pilot. He is also founder of a BASE jump school "Learn to BASE jump".

== Career ==
McDougall is a professional BASE jumper with more than 5,300 BASE jumps in 50 countries.

BASE jumping accomplishments

- 2013 World record for most BASE jumpers jumping indoors
- 2013 1st place in World Extreme BASE Championships, Spain
- 2013 1st place in Accuracy Competitions in both Turkey and China
- 2013 First ever BASE jumps in Kuwait from Al Hamra Tower
- 2012 World first Night Human Slingshot, Dubai
- 2011 2nd place in World BASE Championships
- 2008 UK ProBase 'Who's The Daddy': Overall Champion
- 2003/04 BASE jumping World Champion: 1st place Aerobatics, 1st place Team, 1st place Overall

McDougall has completed more than 7,200 skydives around the world. He is a 6 times national champion and former world record holder. He is advanced in all aspects of skydiving including free flying, relative work, canopy relative work, wingsuit flying, skydiving coaching & instructing, tandem skydiving and aerial camera flying.

Skydiving accomplishments

- 1998-2003 6 time National Skydiving Champion in 4 way and 8 way RW
- 2001-2003 Australian team member for World Championships
- 2002 World Record 300 way Skydive
- 12 Gold medals in various state events
