= Masanori Sekiya =

Japanese racing driver (born 1949)

- Nationality: (Japan) Japanese
- Born: 27 November 1949 (age 76); Ikawa, Shizuoka, Japan

24 Hours of Le Mans career
- Years: 1985–1990, 1992–1993, 1995–1997
- Teams: Tom's, Porsche Kremer Racing, Kokusai Kaihatsu Racing, SARD, Gulf Team Davidoff
- Best finish: 1st (1995)
- Class wins: 1 (1995)

Masanori Sekiya (関谷 正徳, Sekiya Masanori; born 27 November 1949) is a Japanese former racing driver, most famous for being the first Japanese driver to win the 24 Hours of Le Mans, in 1995.

Sekiya drove in single-seaters in his early career, contesting the Japanese Formula 3000 Championship and Formula Nippon from 1987 to 1993, mostly for the Leyton House team. He never achieved any victories, but finished fourth in the standings in 1988 and 1989, scoring three and four podiums, respectively.

A long-time works Toyota driver, Sekiya drove in the All Japan Sports Prototype Championship, All Japan Grand Touring Championship and Japanese Touring Car Championship, a series which he won in 1994, driving a Toyota Chaser for the Tom's team. He was also runner-up the following year.

As Sekiya is rather fond of Le Mans, in 1987, he got married in the town prior to the race. His best result in international sports car racing was winning the 1995 24 Hours of Le Mans, at the wheel of a McLaren F1 GTR for Kokusai Kaihatsu Racing. He became the first Japanese-born driver to win the 24 Hours of Le Mans. He was also fourth in the 1993 edition. He competed in the JGTC until the 2000 season and now works as team manager for the Super GT division of the Toyota Team TOM'S and also runs a racing school at Fuji Speedway. In 1998, Sekiya also appeared in a TV commercial in Japan driving a JZA80 Supra promoting its handling package.

Sekiya retired from professional motorsports in October 2000 and is now involved in team management.

== Racing Record ==
=== 24 Hours of Le Mans results ===
Year	Team	Co-Drivers	Car	Class	Laps	Pos.	Class Pos.
1985	(Japan) Tom's Team	(Japan) Satoru Nakajima (Japan) Kaoru Hoshino	Tom's 85C-L-Toyota	C1	330	12th	12th
1986	(Japan) Tom's Co. Ltd.	(Japan) Satoru Nakajima (United Kingdom) Geoff Lees	Tom's (Dome) 86C-L-Toyota	C1	105	DNF	DNF
1987	(Japan) Toyota Team Tom's	(United Kingdom) Tiff Needell (Japan) Kaoru Hoshino	Toyota 87C-L	C1	39	DNF	DNF
1988	(Japan) Toyota Team Tom's	(United Kingdom) Geoff Lees (Japan) Kaoru Hoshino	Toyota 88C	C1	351	12th	12th
1989	(Germany) Porsche Kremer Racing	(Japan) Hideki Okada (South Africa) George Fouché	Porsche 962CK6	C1	42	DNF	DNF
1990	(Japan) Toyota Team Tom's	(United Kingdom) Geoff Lees (Japan) Hitoshi Ogawa	Toyota 90C-V	C1	347	6th	6th
1992	(Japan) Toyota Team Tom's	(France) Pierre-Henri Raphanel (United Kingdom) Kenny Acheson	Toyota TS010	C1	346	**2nd**	**2nd**
1993	(Japan) Toyota Team Tom's	(United Kingdom) Eddie Irvine (Japan) Toshio Suzuki	Toyota TS010	C1	364	4th	4th
1995	(United Kingdom) Kokusai Kaihatsu Racing	(France) Yannick Dalmas (Finland) JJ Lehto	McLaren F1 GTR	GT1	298	**1st**	**1st**
1996	(Japan) Team SARD Toyota	(Japan) Hidetoshi Mitsusada (Japan) Masami Kageyama	Toyota Supra LM	GT1	205	DNF	DNF
1997	(United Kingdom) Gulf Team Davidoff (United Kingdom) GTC Racing	(United Kingdom) Ray Bellm (United Kingdom) Andrew Gilbert-Scott	McLaren F1 GTR	GT1	326	DNF	DNF

=== Japanese Formula 3000 Championship results ===
(key) (Races in bold indicate pole position) (Races in italics indicate fastest lap)

Year	Team	1	2	3	4	5	6	7	8	9	10	11	DC	Pts
1987	Leyton House Racing Team	SUZ; Ret	FUJ; 6	MIN; Ret	SUZ	SUZ; 5	SUG; Ret	FUJ; Ret	SUZ; 5	SUZ; 4			10th	32
1988	Leyton House Racing Team	SUZ; Ret	FUJ; 3	MIN; 6	SUZ; 3	SUG; Ret	FUJ; Ret	SUZ; 4	**SUZ**; 2				4th	18
1989	Leyton House Racing Team	SUZ; 3	FUJ; 3	MIN; 3	SUZ; Ret	SUG; Ret	FUJ; 4	SUZ; 8	SUZ; 2				5th	21
1990	Leyton House Racing Team	SUZ; 9	FUJ; Ret	MIN; Ret	SUZ; Ret	**SUG**; 19	FUJ; Ret	FUJ; Ret	SUZ; 14	FUJ; Ret	SUZ; Ret		NC	0
1991	Leyton House Racing Team	SUZ; 4	AUT; 15	FUJ; 17	MIN; 10	SUZ; Ret	SUG; 11	FUJ; 9	SUZ	FUJ			17th	3
1991	Team LeMans										SUZ; 9	FUJ; Ret	17th	3
1992	Hagiwara Racing	SUZ; 18	FUJ; 8	MIN; 8	SUZ; 10	AUT; Ret	SUG; 11	FUJ; Ret	FUJ; 12	SUZ; Ret	FUJ; 13	FUJ; Ret	NC	0
1993	TOM'S	SUZ; 10	FUJ; 7	MIN	SUZ; Ret	AUT; C	SUG; 23	FUJ; C	FUJ; 4	SUZ; 18	FUJ	SUZ; Ret	16th	3

=== Complete JTCC results ===
(key) (Races in bold indicate pole position) (Races in italics indicate fastest lap)

Year	Team	Car	1	2	3	4	5	6	7	8	9	10	11	12	13	14	15	16	17	18	DC	Pts
1994	Toyota Team Tom's	Toyota Corona	AUT; 1; 2	AUT; 2; 3	SUG; 1; 17	SUG; 2 Ret	TOK; 1; 2	TOK; 2; 1	SUZ; 1; 4	SUZ; 2; 3	MIN; 1 Ret	MIN; 2; 2	TAI; 1 Ret	TAI; 2; 5	TSU; 1; 1	TSU; 2; 1	SEN; 1; 6	SEN; 2; 3	FUJ; 1; 6	FUJ; 2; 3	**1st**	**135**
1995	Toyota Team Tom's	Toyota Corona EXiV	FUJ; 1; 3	FUJ; 2; 2	SUG; 1; 1	SUG; 2; 1	TOK; 1; 2	TOK; 2; 4	SUZ; 1; 5	SUZ; 2; 4	MIN; 1; 22	MIN; 2; 3	TAI; 1; 1	TAI; 2; 3	SEN; 1; 4	SEN; 2; 11	FUJ; 1 Ret	FUJ; 2; 5			**2nd**	**117**
1996	Toyota Team Tom's	Toyota Corona EXiV	FUJ; 1; 5	FUJ; 2; 3	SUG; 1; 3	SUG; 2; 2	SUZ; 1 Ret	SUZ; 2; 15	MIN; 1; 20	MIN; 2; 3	SEN; 1; 7	SEN; 2 Ret	TOK; 1; 7	TOK; 2; 14	FUJ; 1 NC	FUJ; 2; 9					7th	55
1997	Toyota Team Tom's	Toyota Chaser	FUJ; 1 C	FUJ; 2 C	TAI; 1; 13	TAI; 2; 7	SUG; 1; 11	SUG; 2 Ret	SUZ; 1; 12	SUZ; 2; 9	MIN; 1 Ret	MIN; 2 DNS	SEN; 1 Ret	SEN; 2; 3	TOK; 1; 9	TOK; 2; 6	FUJ; 1; 18	FUJ; 2; 8			13th	25
1998	Toyota Team Tom's	Toyota Chaser	FUJ; 1; 8	FUJ; 2; 2	MOT; 1	SUG; 1; 1	SUG; 2; 3	SUZ; 1; 4	SUZ; 2; 1	MIN; 1; 1	MIN; 2; 1	TAI; 1	FUJ; 7								**1st**	**128**

=== Complete JGTC results ===
(key) (Races in bold indicate pole position) (Races in italics indicate fastest lap)

Year	Team	Car	Class	1	2	3	4	5	6	7	DC	Pts
1995	Toyota Castrol Team Tom's	Toyota Supra	GT1	SUZ; 6	FUJ; 6	SEN; 1	FUJ; Ret	SUG; 7	MIN; 4		6th	42
1996	Toyota Castrol Team	Toyota Supra	GT500	SUZ; 5	FUJ; 2	SEN; 3	MIN; Ret	SUG; 9	MIN; Ret		8th	38
1997	Toyota Castrol Team	Toyota Supra	GT500	**SUZ**; 3	FUJ; 6	**SEN**; 3	FUJ; 3	MIN; 3	SUG; 4		**3rd**	**64**
1998	Toyota Castrol Team Tom's	Toyota Supra	GT500	SUZ; 6	FUJ; C	SEN; 3	FUJ; 8	MOT; 3	MIN; 16	SUG; Ret	7th	33
1999	Toyota Castrol Team Tom's	Toyota Supra	GT500	SUZ; 4	FUJ; 9	SUG; 1	MIN; 10	**FUJ**; 4	TAI; 4	**MOT**; 1	**2nd**	**73**
2000	Toyota Castrol Team Tom's	Toyota Supra	GT500	MOT; Ret	FUJ; 12	SUG; 9	FUJ; 5	TAI; 14	MIN; Ret	SUZ; 9	17th	12

== Sources ==
- Masanori Sekiya career summary at DriverDB.com
- Japanese Sports Prototype Championship tables
- Toyota Team TOM'S profile

Sporting positions
Preceded by Masahiko Kageyama	Japanese Touring Car Championship; Champion; 1994	Succeeded by Steve Soper
Preceded by Yannick Dalmas; Hurley Haywood; Mauro Baldi	Winner of the 24 Hours of Le Mans; 1995 with: Yannick Dalmas; JJ Lehto	Succeeded by Manuel Reuter; Davy Jones; Alexander Wurz
