= Lanzante Limited =

British automotive company

- Type: Limited Company
- Industry: Automotive
- Founder: Paul Lanzante
- Headquarters: Petersfield, United Kingdom
- Key people: Dean Lanzante; Paul Lanzante
- Number of employees: 12 (2018)
- Website: Official website

Lanzante Limited is a British automotive company specializing in servicing, restoring and developing unique vehicles, while also participating in auto racing in both modern and historic guises under the title of Lanzante Motorsport.

Lanzante Motorsport won the 1995 24 Hours of Le Mans with a McLaren F1 GTR for McLaren Automotive under the name of Kokusai Kaihatsu Racing, leading to Lanzante becoming a service centre for road and race McLarens.

== Company history ==
Lanzante was founded in the 1970s by Paul Lanzante initially focused on restoring and preparing historic cars. Lanzante's logo is an image of the Hindu god Ganesha, which was recommended to Paul by George Harrison of The Beatles. The two were close and Paul was referenced by Harrison on his eponymous album inner sleeve, along with Jackie Stewart. In the 1980s, Lanzante supported the restoration of Harrison's iconic Radford Mini, which was repainted by artist Phil Lemon.

In 1993, Dean Lanzante, son of founder Paul, joined the business, and two years later they had expanded into motor racing. Lanzante are recognised as a key service and maintenance centre for elite McLaren cars and in 2022 serviced 25 McLaren F1's alone. Lanzante's base is also home to McLaren Petersfield, one of the UK dealerships within the McLaren cars network.

In 2018, Lanzante were awarded a Queen's Award for Enterprise. In the same year, Lanzante acquired a number of unreleased Petronas FP1 motorcycles developed with Carl Fogarty, and meticulously restored them and sold the motorcycles onto the open market. In recent years, Lanzante have created bespoke, limited run versions of a variety of supercars including road-going versions of various race cars including the Pagani Zonda R and McLaren P1 GTR. Furthermore, Lanzante developed the unique Porsche 930 TAG Turbo, a Formula 1 powered Porsche road car from the 1980s. Ahead of the 2024 Goodwood Festival of Speed, Lanzante revealed a rendering of a special edition TAG Turbo called the Championship Edition that would launch at the event. A limited run of three vehicles, each celebrating a McLaren title in the 1980s. At the same event, Lanzante displayed two road-going converted Porsche 935s, alongside a rotary powered, 1000 horsepower McLaren P1 GTR which has been tuned to a drift specification for Mike Whiddett. In July 2024, Lanzante confirmed it was assessing customer enquiries about road-legal versions of the forthcoming Red Bull RB17 designed by Adrian Newey. Conversions were initially anticipated to cost around £500,000, on top of the £5million vehicle purchase price. The team at Lanzante are also involved in a project due to complete in 2025, to make the world's first road legal Pagani Huayra R for car collector and influencer Petfred. At Goodwood Festival of Speed in the same year, Lanzante confirmed they were developing a road legal version of the Bugatti Bolide.

== Motorsport history ==
(United Kingdom) Lanzante Motorsport
- Team principal(s): Paul & Dean Lanzante
- Former series: BPR Global GT Series; British GT Championship; International Sports Racing Series; Britcar
- Drivers' Championships: 1 (1996 British GT GT1)

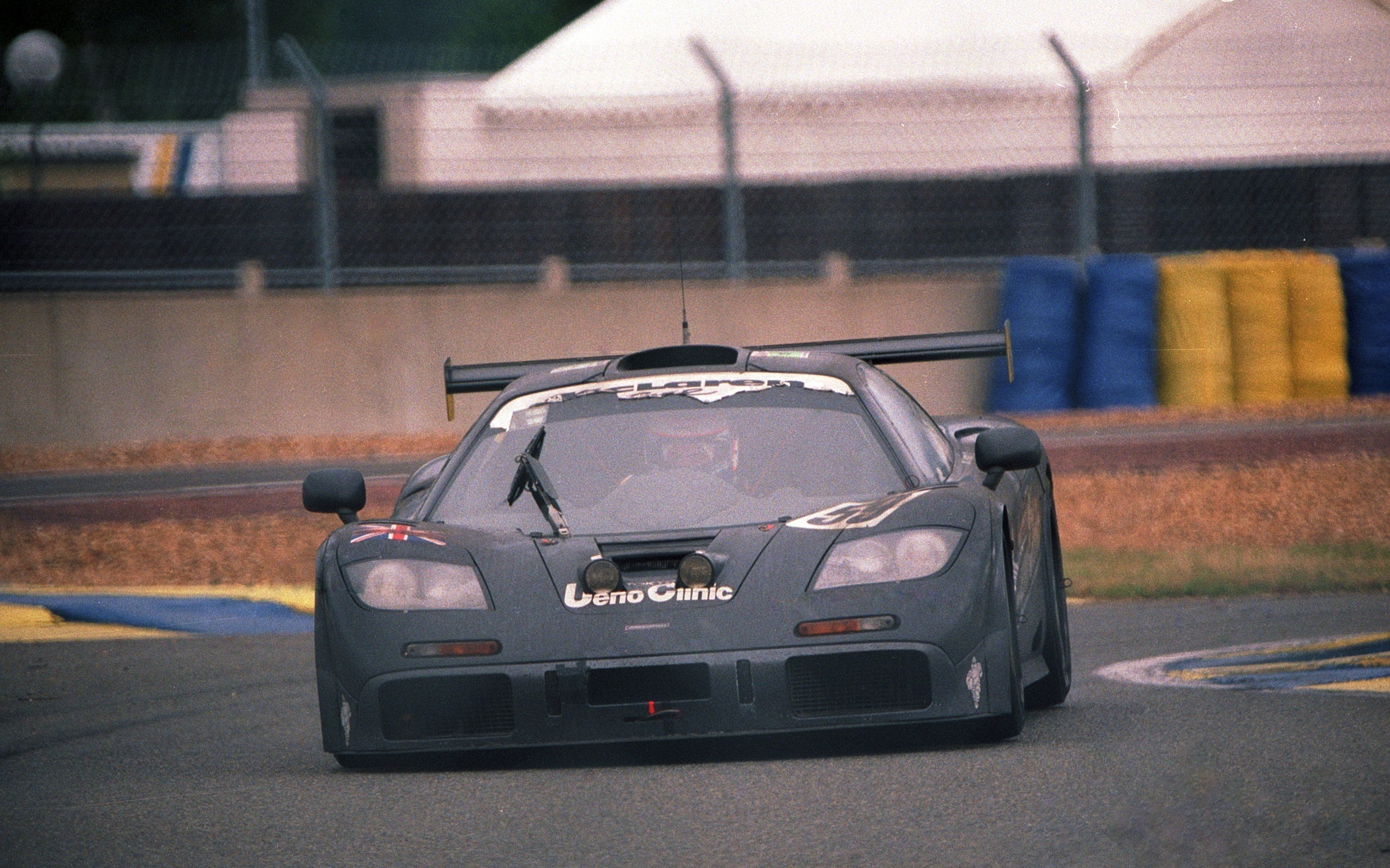
Lanzante's Kokusai Kaihatsu McLaren at the 1995 Le Mans 24h

Following years of participation in historic motorsport, Lanzante moved to modern racing by entering the BPR Global GT Series in 1995 with a Porsche 911 Turbo competing in the GT3 category with drivers Paul Burdell, Wido Rössler, and Soames Langton. The team competed in eight rounds of the season, with a best finish of 6th in round 10 at Silverstone for the British Empire Trophy race. The Porsche suffered three retirements, at the Autodrome de Linas-Montlhéry for the Paris 1000kms after 84 laps, Donington Park with gearbox failure after 62 laps and finally at Monza after 37 laps with engine failure. The team finished the championship in 15th place overall scoring 88 points.

In the same year, the McLaren F1 GTR was debuting in BPR, as well as entering the 24 Hours of Le Mans. McLaren's developmental car was loaned to an entry backed by sponsors Kokusai Kaihatsu UK, while Lanzante was chosen to organize and run the team, which incorporated a small number of McLaren employees, other McLaren associates and experienced endurance engineers. Drivers for the effort were JJ Lehto, Masanori Sekiya, and Yannick Dalmas. Lanzante's McLaren was the fastest from the manufacturer in qualifying, and inherited the race lead after other McLarens suffered woes. The Kokusai Kaihatsu McLaren went on to win the 24 Hours of Le Mans by a one lap margin, making the McLaren the first car and Lanzante the first team to win on debut at Le Mans. In addition Lehto and Sekiya's involvement meant it was the first Le Mans win for a Finnish driver and a Japanese driver. Following Lanzante's Le Mans victory, their McLaren was returned and the team remained with Porsche throughout the rest of 1995.

In 1996 Lanzante purchased their own McLaren GTR for use in the British GT Championship, as well as a Porsche 911 GT2 for BPR. The Porsche was also entered for Le Mans, but an invitation to partake in the race was not granted. Langton and Burdell remained in the Porsche, joined by Stanley Dickens and earned several podiums over the season, with a best finish of 2nd at Monza and Nurburgring. The final races of the season were challenging for the Lanzante Porsche, at Spa the team were disqualified from their 3rd place finish owing to Burdell not completing the required number of laps. At the penultimate Nogaro driver Soames Langton was involved in a serious crash driving the Lanzante Porsche, which left him in a coma and ultimately suffering from locked in syndrome. The team did not race at Zhuhai for the final race of the 1996 season.

In the 1996 British GT, the team's McLaren was driven by Ian Flux and James Ulrich, and won a race at Donington Park. Although Flux and Ulrich lost the overall championship title to the drivers from Marcos, they did secure the title in the GT1 category.

Lanzante did not return to modern motorsport again until 2003 when the company developed a Lotus Elise. The car debuted at Brands Hatch for the final round of the season, driven by Dean Lanzante and Chris Yandell. The pair finished 8th overall, and 2nd in their class. The Elise was later developed for the Britcar series, with Formula 1 designer Adrian Newey sharing driving duties.

== Specialist vehicles ==
=== Lotus 2-Eleven ===
In 2020, Lanzante were commissioned to rebuild a Lotus 2-Eleven car to combine elements of the GT4 race car version that had competed in the likes of GT4 European Cup, Belcar and the British GT series. The vehicle received a number of upgrades including a full GT4 bodykit, roll cage, brakes, pedal box and respray to nardo grey from original black paint.

=== McLaren P1 GTR-LM ===
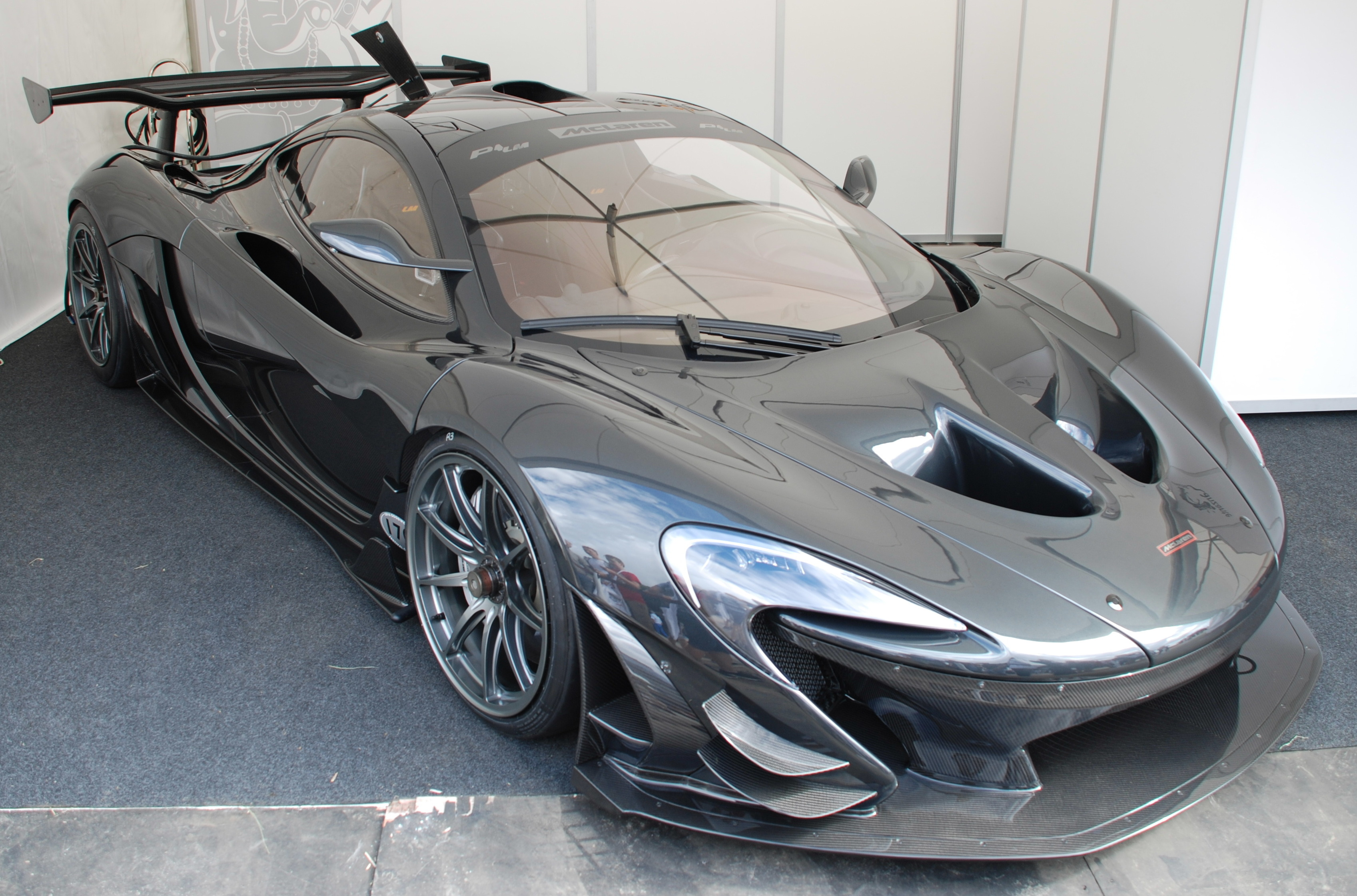
McLaren P1 LM

With the production run of McLaren P1 GTRs having been built and sold, and prompted by their efforts in converting track-only spec P1 GTRs to road-legal spec variants, Lanzante Motorsport commissioned McLaren Special Operations' Bespoke division to build a further 6 new P1 GTRs for them to develop into road-legal P1 LM variants. Of this production run, five P1 LMs have been sold and the other P1 LM, the prototype which is designated XP1 LM, has been retained and is being used for development and testing. To make them into P1 LM spec, Lanzante Motorsport developed these P1 GTRs by, amongst other modifications, making changes to the drivetrain hardware (to increase power), by employing a modified rear wing and larger front splitter and dive planes (to improve downforce) and by removing the air-jack system and using Inconel catalytic converter pipes and exhaust headers, lightweight fabricated charge coolers, Lexan windows, lighter seats (from the F1 GTR) and titanium exhausts, bolts and fixings (to save weight). A number of the P1 GTR's were painted in historic McLaren F1 racing liveries including the Lark and Gulf designs used in the 1990s.

At the 2016 Goodwood Festival of Speed, the prototype P1 LM, XP1 LM, set the fastest ever time for a road car up the Goodwood hillclimb, with a time of 47.07 seconds, driven by Kenny Bräck. On 27 April 2017, the prototype P1 LM, XP1 LM, continued its success on track, beating the road car lap record time at the Nürburgring Nordschleife, with a time of 6:43.22 using road legal Pirelli P Zero Trofeo R tyres but without the front number plate, which is required to make a car road legal. This time was once again set by Kenny Bräck, and announced on 26 May 2017.

=== McLaren P1 GT ===
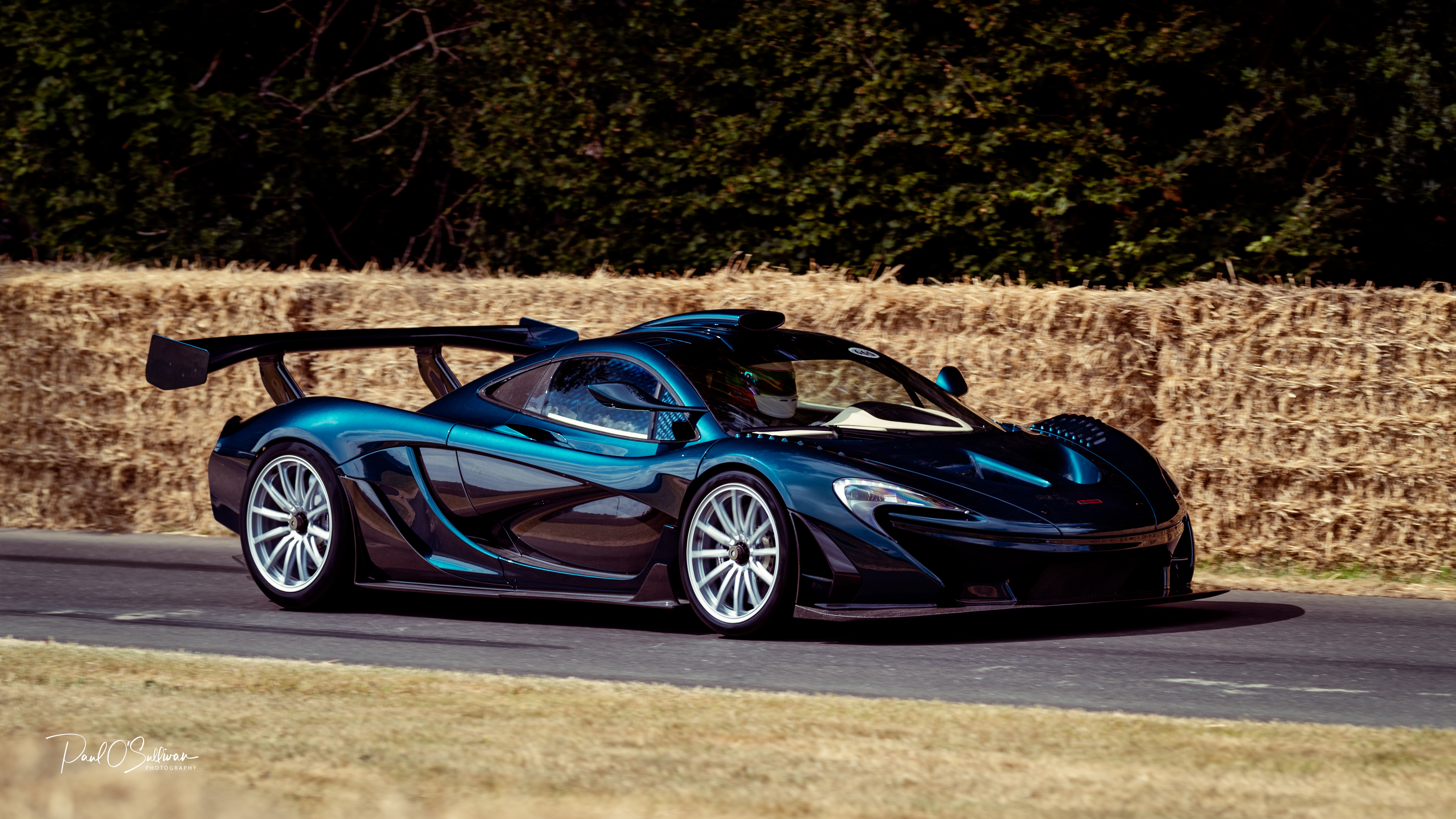
McLaren P1 GT

Following the P1-GTR project, Lanzante created a unique P1 GT car named after the three McLaren F1 GT's. The car was a ground-up rebuild of the P1 GTR chassis number 33 for a client based in the Middle East. Retaining the GTR engine, the P1 GT was given a new rear end including retention of a fixed GTR wing and the addition of visible quad exhaust pipes. Inside, the vehicle was much more plush than a standard GTR with leather finishes throughout. The conversion was estimated to cost £500,000 on top of the purchase price of a P1 GTR.

=== McLaren P1 HDK ===
Lanzante continued producing McLaren P1 special editions, creating the P1 HDK. The first was shown at Pebble Beach in 2021 a combination produced by Lanzante with O'Gara Coach in the United States, before the second was launched at the 2022 Goodwood Festival of Speed, the P1 HDK is an upgraded P1 based on a similar concept to the McLaren F1 HDK offered in the mid-1990s. The cars were stripped back to their carbon fibre base, before being reassembled with upgraded suspension components, and additional downforce added to the bodywork including a fixed rear wing from the P1 GTR. The second P1 HDK received power upgrades to the standard engine, bored out to 4 litres by Cosworth and estimated horsepower reaching over 1,000bhp. A total of nine P1 HDK conversions are planned by Lanzante. The third was completed in February 2023, and supplied to a customer in Saudi Arabia with a blue exterior and interior, along with centre-lock racing wheels.

=== McLaren P1 Spider ===
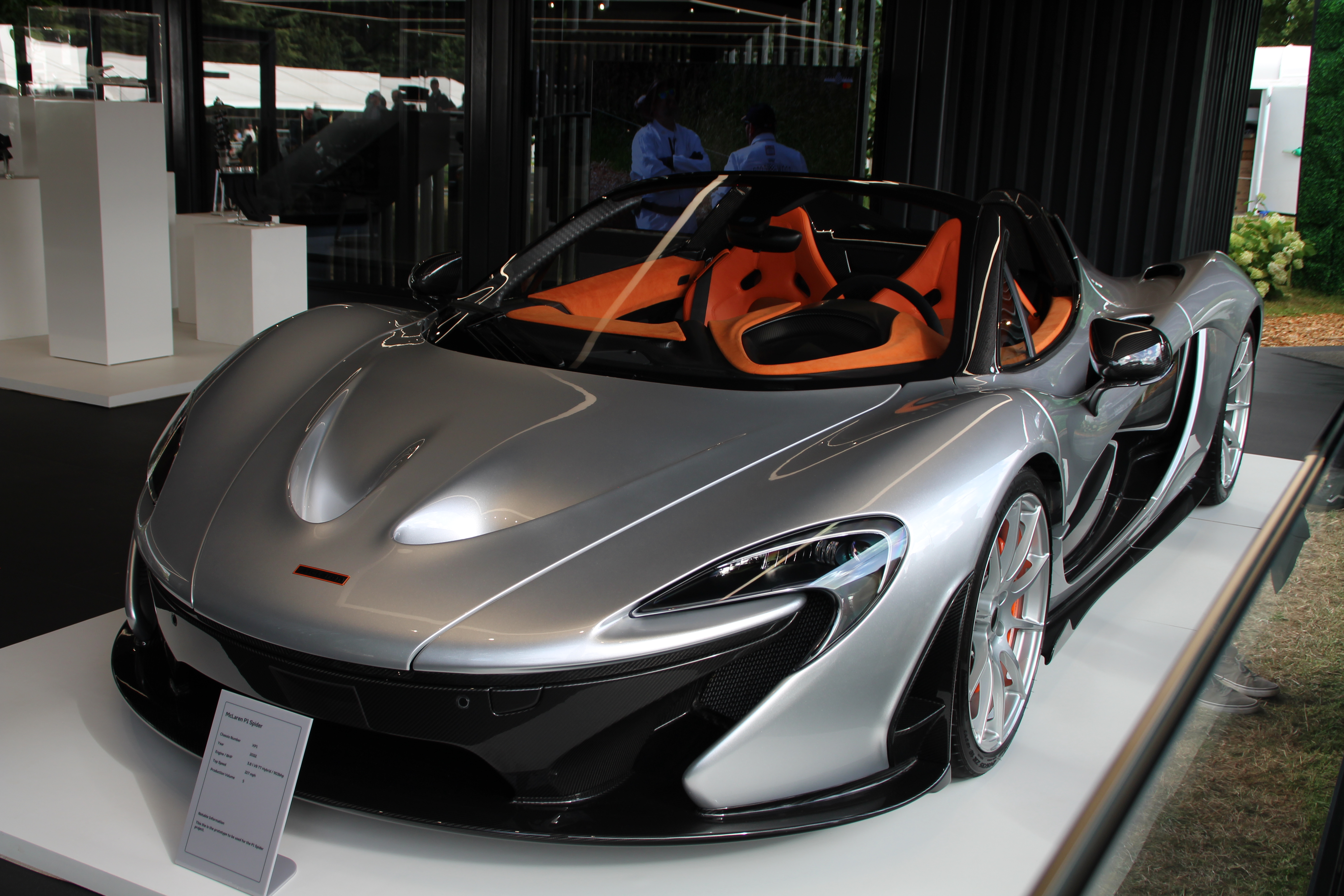
McLaren P1 Spider

In June 2022, Lanzante revealed the first of five planned McLaren P1 Spiders. Paul Howse who designed the original P1 for McLaren was drafted in to design the changes required. The vehicle was extensively modified as a result of removing the roof from the standard P1, notably the design requiring two large carbon fibre buttresses to stand tall behind the seats to replace the main roof air intake that would have featured on the coupe. Furthermore, Lanzante redesigned the exterior aerodynamics to encourage more air into the side mounted air intakes to aid cooling. The engine cover was also modified, now a single piece removable clamshell, which made the power unit more visible than on its coupe counterpart. The price of the P1 Spider was estimated to be £2.4million in 2022, including a donor P1.

=== McLaren LM 25 Editions ===
To celebrate the 25th anniversary of McLaren's Le Mans 24 hour victory, Lanzante released seven modified McLaren vehicles called the LM 25 editions. These were coupe and convertible variants of the 600LT, 765LT, Senna and Senna GTR. Each car was painted in the Ueno Clinic 01R black, and gold brake calipers. Lanzante launched the models at the 2023 Goodwood Festival of Speed.

The McLaren Senna GTR LM 25 was sold by Sotheby's in Monaco for €1.45million in 2024.

=== Pagani Zonda Revolución ===
Pagani built five Zonda Revolucións based on their Zonda R race car, and one was converted by Lanzante into a road version. Lanzante showed the car at the 2023 Goodwood Festival of Speed, albeit specific modifications were kept secret.

=== Porsche 930 TAG Turbo ===
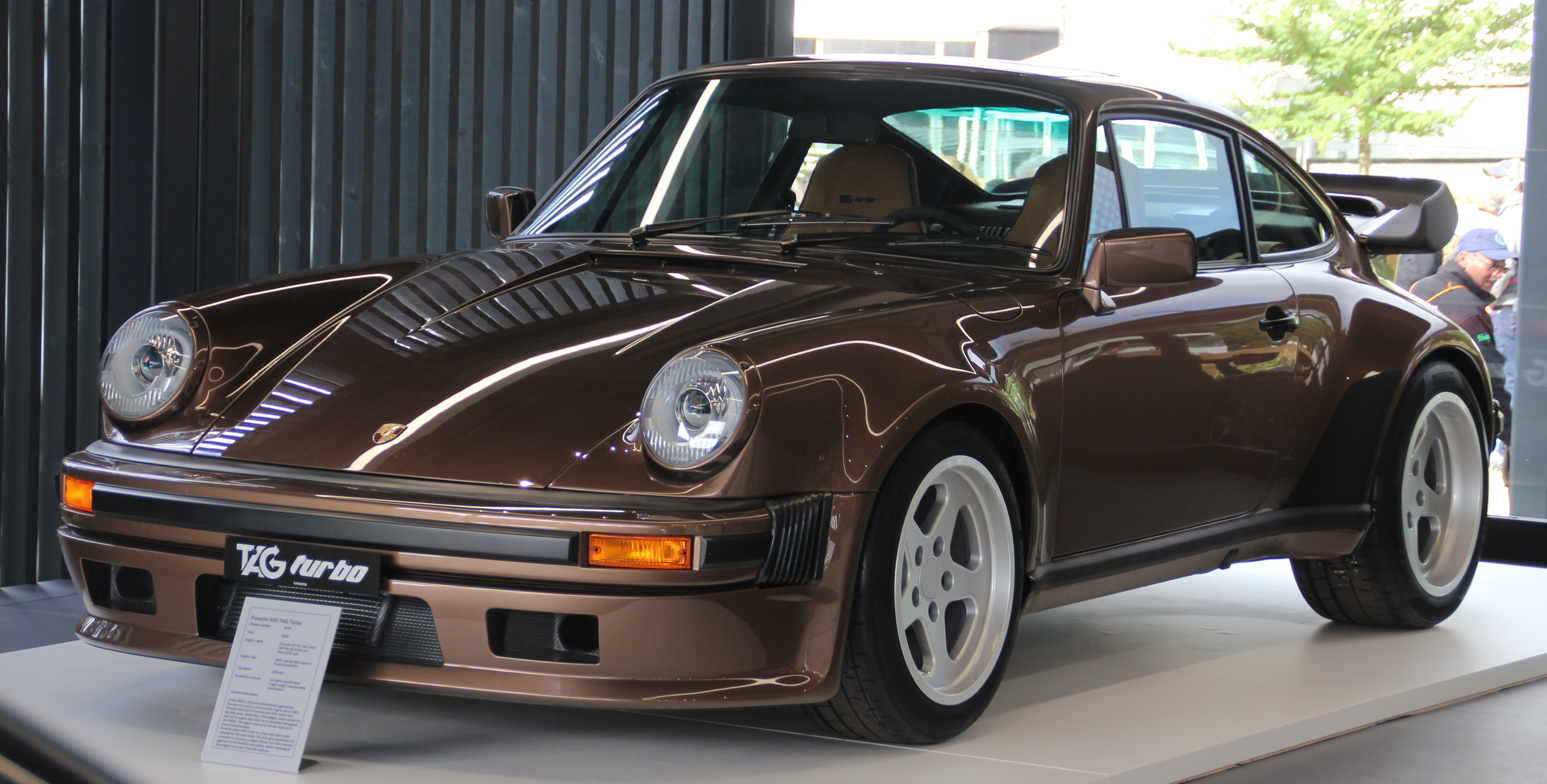
Porsche TAG Turbo

In September 2018, Lanzante introduced a new model based on the 1980s McLaren test mule Porsche 930, that the Formula One team had used for capability testing of the new 1.5 litre turbocharged engine produced by Techniques d'Avant Garde. Lanzante launched the vehicle at the RennSport Reunion VI.

Lanzante obtained permission from McLaren to produce the vehicle, and purchased 11 engines originally installed in their F1 cars. Lanzante brought Cosworth to the project to restore the engines, and each produced vehicle would have a plaque signifying the engines race history, engine number and the cars production number.

The display car's engine was originally fitted in 1984 to Niki Lauda's MP4/2 in which he won the 1984 British Grand Prix. At the 2023 Goodwood Festival of Speed, Lanzante displayed vehicle 8 of 11 TAG Turbos, commissioned by for former Ferrari and McLaren F1 driver Stefan Johansson who hand painted the exterior of the vehicle. Vehicle referenced AP87 was sold at RM Sotheby's Monterey 2025 auction for $1.93m. The car featured an engine used by Alain Prost in 1986 and 1987.

Ahead of the 2024 Festival of Speed, Lanzante revealed a limited edition run of three Porsche 930 TAG Turbos called the Championship Edition. These vehicles have benefitted from further weight reduction down to 920kg, alongside engine modifications from McLaren and Cosworth, raising engine power to 625PS and the redline to 10,250rpm.

=== Lanzante 95-59 ===
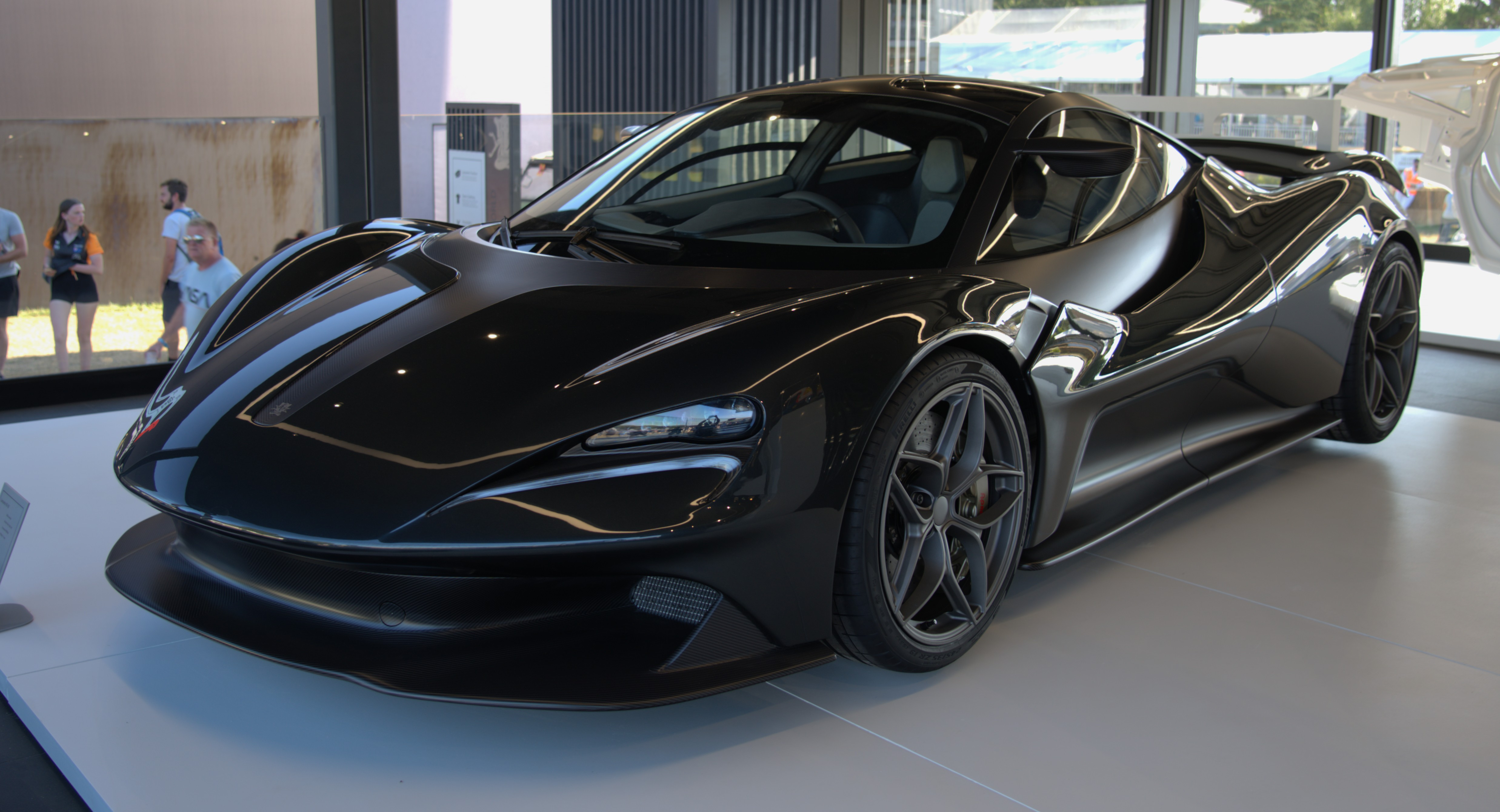
Lanzante 95-59

At the 2025 Goodwood Festival of Speed, Lanzante launched their latest supercar the 95-59 based on the McLaren 750S and designed by Paul Howse. The car is a homage to the McLaren F1 GTR that won the 1995 24 Hours of Le Mans, and the display example was finished in "Ueno Grey" the same colour as the winning F1 GTR. The engine bay of the 95-59 also features gold heatshield, a famous feature of the F1. The name 95-59 is based on the race winning year, and the number of the race winning car.

The 95-59 features a three seat layout placing the driver centrally, and uses the twin-turbo charged V8 McLaren M840T engine uprated to over 850hp. The design uses McLaren visual cues, but includes more aggressive aerodynamics and a central titanium exhaust based on an F22 fighter jet. The dihedral doors remain, alongside an interconnected hydraulic damper system found in the McLaren 720S and 750.

It is anticipated Lanzante will produce 59 examples of the 95-59, at an estimated price of £1.2m each.
