= McLaren F1 GTR =

Racing car

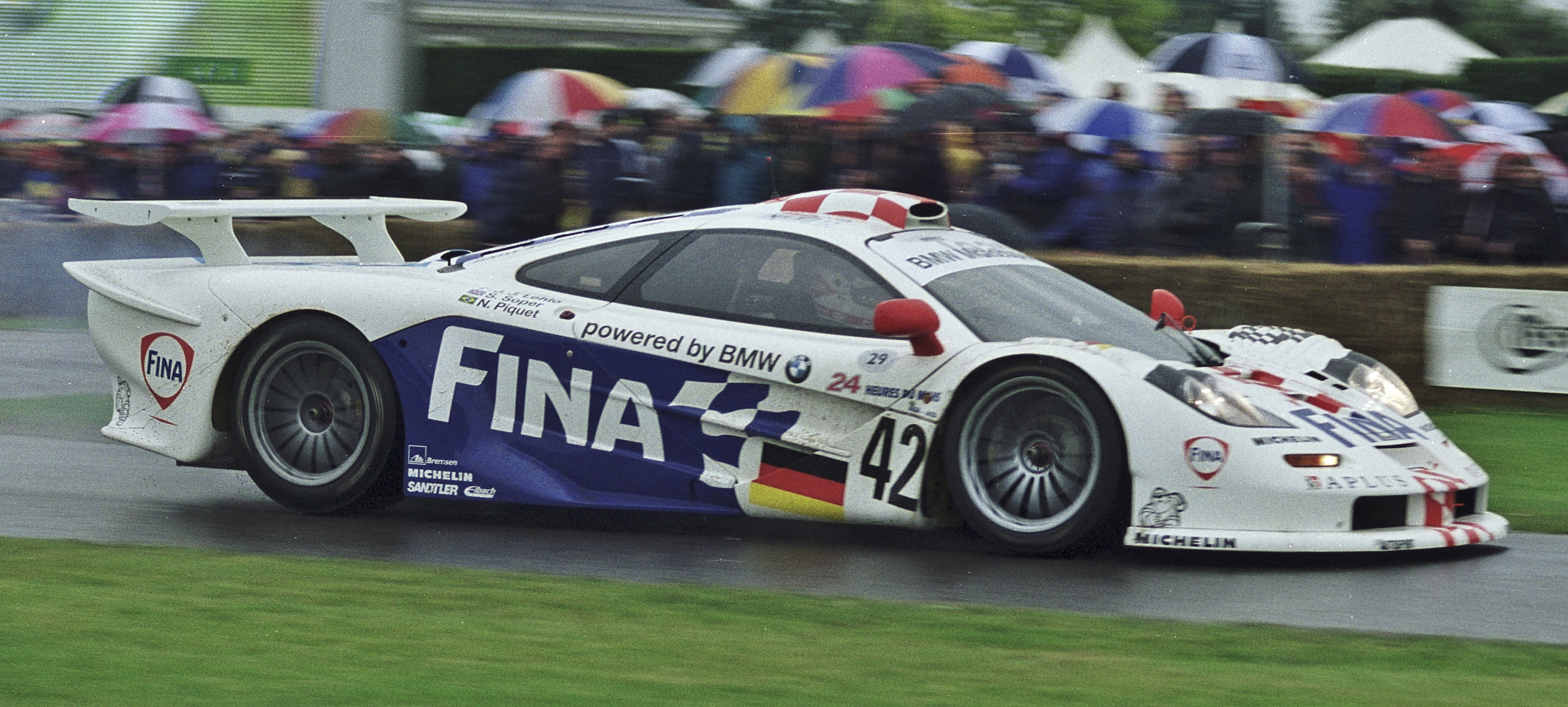
- The 1997 McLaren F1 GTR Longtail at the 1998 Goodwood Festival of Speed
- Category: GT1
- Designers: Gordon Murray; Paul Rosche (engine designer) (BMW)
- Successor: McLaren MCL-HY

Technical specifications
- Chassis: Carbon fiber monocoque
- Suspension (front): Revised McLaren F1 double wishbone suspension system
- Suspension (rear): Revised McLaren F1 double wishbone suspension system
- Engine: BMW S70/2 (1995-96); BMW S70/3 (1997-98) 6,064 cc (370.0 cu in) (S70/2); 5,990 cc (365.5 cu in) (S70/3) V12 naturally-aspirated, rear, mid-mounted
- Transmission: 6-speed: manual; sequential manual (Long Tail version)
- Tires: Michelin; Goodyear (Harrods Racing); Pirelli; Bridgestone (Team Lark)

Competition history
- Notable entrants: (United Kingdom) Harrods Racing; (United Kingdom) Kokusai Kaihatsu Racing; (United Kingdom) Gulf Racing; (Japan) Team Lark; (Germany) BMW Motorsport
- Notable drivers: (United Kingdom) Ian Flux; (United Kingdom) James Weaver; (United Kingdom) Ray Bellm; (Brazil) Maurizio Sandro Sala; (United States) Jake Ulrich; (Japan) Masanori Sekiya; (France) Yannick Dalmas; (Finland) JJ Lehto
- Debut: 1995 Circuito de Jerez
| Races | Wins | Poles |
|---|---|---|
| 120+ | 38 | 6 |
- Constructors' Championships: 3
- Drivers' Championships: 3

The McLaren F1 GTR is the racing variant of the McLaren F1 sports car first produced in 1995 for grand touring style racing, such as the BPR Global GT Series, FIA GT Championship, JGTC, and British GT Championship. It was powered by the naturally aspirated BMW S70/2 V12 engine. It is most famous for its overall victory at the 1995 24 Hours of Le Mans where it won against faster purpose-built prototypes in very wet conditions. The F1 GTR raced internationally until 2005 when the final race chassis was retired.

== Development ==
=== 1995–1996 ===
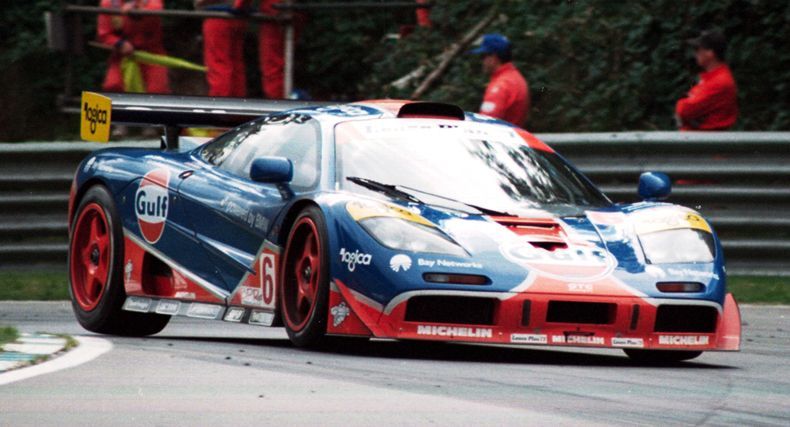
The 1996 F1 GTR of Gulf Racing at Brands Hatch.

Gordon Murray, creator of the McLaren F1, originally saw his creation as the ultimate road car, with no intention to take the car racing. Although the car used many racing technologies and designs, it was felt that the car should be a road car first, without any intent built into the creation of the car to modify it into a racing car.

However, soon after the launch of the McLaren F1, the BPR Global GT Series was created. Starting in the 1994 season, the series featured racing modifications of sports cars such as the Venturi 600 LM, Ferrari F40, and Porsche 911 Turbo. Viewed as a possible replacement for the defunct World Sportscar Championship, major manufacturers were taking interest in the series. At the same time, teams were also looking for faster and more capable cars for the series top class, GT1. Many teams, such as those run by Ray Bellm and Thomas Bscher, seeing the potential in the McLaren F1 road cars, Le Mans winner John Nielsen turned to Gordon Murray in an attempt to convince him to offer factory backing on racing versions for the BPR series.

Finally, Murray relented and agreed to modify the F1 into a racing car, agreeing to build several chassis for competition in the 1995 season. An unused F1 chassis which was meant to become #019 was taken by McLaren and modified by the company as a developmental prototype. Because of the similarity to a race car, extensive modification was not needed to actually turn the F1 into a racing car. Bodywork modification saw the addition of various cooling ducts, most noticeably a large one in the center of the nose and two placed in the location of the storage lockers on the side of the car. A large adjustable fixed wing was added to the rear of the car. Even the 1995 versions of F1 GTR generated enough downforce to run along the ceiling at 100 mph. The interior was stripped of all luxuries and given a full racing cage. Carbon brakes replaced the stock units. Because of the rules at the time, the BMW S70 V12 engine was required to use an air restrictor to limit power output to around 600 PS (592 hp; 441 kW), making the racing car less powerful than the road car, yet faster and more nimble due to a lowered overall weight. Features such as the central seating position, butterfly doors and even the standard gearbox were retained. McLaren co-ordinated a 24-hour test at Magny-Cours to find weaknesses in the car and develop upgrades to supply to the teams.

1995 McLaren-BMW F1 GTR
McLaren-BMW F1 GTR at Goodwood Festival of Speed 2009

A total of nine chassis would be built for the 1995 season, with #01R being retained by the factory as a test mule, except for a one-off use by Kokusai Kaihatsu Racing at the 24 Hours of Le Mans. British team GTC Racing received two F1 GTRs, with a third being used to replace a destroyed car. David Price Racing, BBA Competition, Mach One Racing, and Giroix Racing Team would all receive one chassis each, while the final chassis, #09R, was sold to Hassanal Bolkiah, the Sultan of Brunei, for his car collection.

At Le Mans 1995, the Kokusai Kaihatsu McLaren obtained victory and the highest practice top speed of the year, reaching 281 km/h (174.605 mph) on the Mulsanne Straight.

Following the success of the 1995 season, McLaren set forth to upgrade the car to remain competitive, especially against the threat of newer sports cars appearing such as the Ferrari F50 GT (which was withdrawn quickly) and the Porsche 911 GT1. They were assisted by BMW Motorsport, who at the time decided to use their connection to McLaren to enter sports car racing by running their own race team with F1 GTRs.

Among the modifications were an extension of the front and rear bodywork, including a larger splitter attached to the front of the car. The bodywork was also modified to allow it to be removed more quickly for easier repair. The car's standard gearbox was modified to include a lighter magnesium housing and more robust mechanicals. These modifications allowed for the weight of the GTR to be lowered by 38 kg. Due to demand, nine more new GTRs were built, while two older GTRs (#03R and #06R) were also modified to the 1996-spec. The F1 GTR 1996 was the fastest variant in terms of straight line speed - the car hit 330 km/h on the Mulsanne Straight at Le Mans in 1996, which is 13 km/h faster than the 1997 long-tail F1 GTR and even 6 km/h faster than the 1996 Porsche GT1.

=== 1997 ===
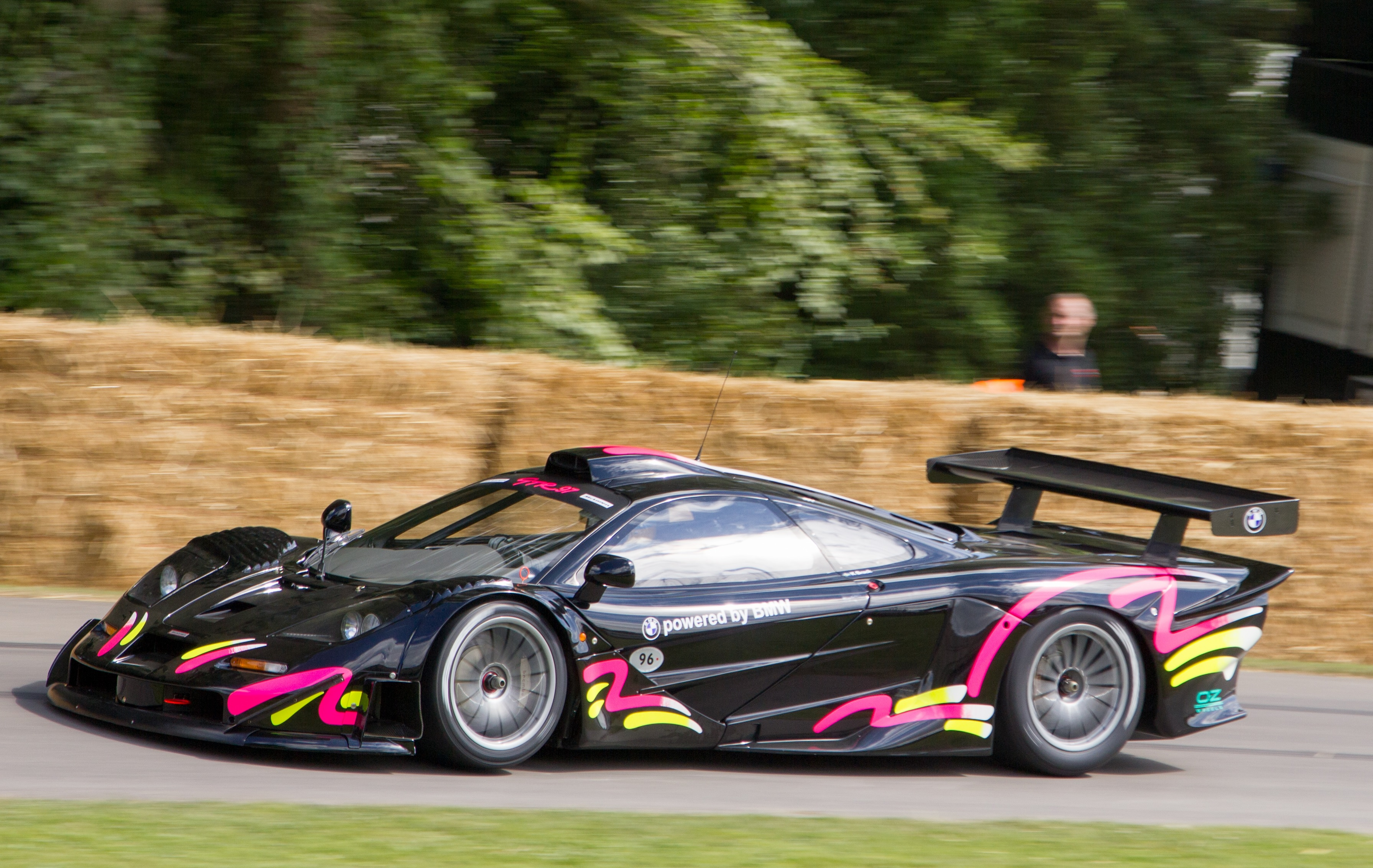
The 1997 F1 GTR of Richard Smith driven by Kenny Bräck at Goodwood FoS.

With the BPR Global GT Series reformed into the FIA GT Championship in 1997, rules regarding the cars used in the premier GT1 class were altered. Homologation specials like the Porsche 911 GT1 had already proven their worth in the final races of 1996, while newcomer Mercedes-Benz was showing the potential of their new CLK-GTR in testing. McLaren was therefore forced to give the F1 extensive modifications in order to be able to compete against cars that had been meant as race cars first and not road cars like the F1.

First and foremost, the F1 required extensive modification to its bodywork in order to gain as much aerodynamic downforce as possible. Although it retained the same carbon-fibre monocoque as the road car, the entire exterior of the car was purpose-built. A much longer nose and tail, as well as a wider rear wing, were designed in order to maximize the amount of aerodynamic downforce, while the wheel arches were widened in order to allow for the maximum amount of grip from the tyres allowed by the rules. Ground clearance was also changed to 70 millimetres (2.76 in) front and rear, rather than the 60 millimetres (2.36 in) front and 80 millimetres (3.15 in) rear clearance of the 1996-spec car.

The engine also saw extensive modification, with a stroke reduction bringing the BMW S70 V12 down to 5,990 cubic centimetres (366 cu in) in an attempt to prolong the life of the engines, while still maintaining the air restrictor-controlled 600 metric horsepower (441 kW). The standard gearbox was replaced with a new X-trac 6-speed sequential transmission.

A total of ten more GTRs were built, with none of the previous cars being upgraded to the 1997-spec. In order to be allowed to construct cars that were so radically different from the F1 road car, McLaren was forced to build production road cars using the GTR '97's bodywork. These cars came to be known as the F1 GT, of which only three were built. The 1997-spec cars are commonly referred to as the "Long Tail" version due to their stretched bodywork, most noticeably at the rear.

At Le Mans 1997, the car reached 317 kilometres per hour (196.97 mph) on the Mulsanne straight. This was still slightly slower than some of the field, including the Porsche 911 GT1 Evo's - 326 kilometres per hour (202.57 mph), Nissan R390 GT1's - 319 kilometres per hour (198.22 mph) and TWR Porsche Joest LMP's - 320 kilometres per hour (198.84 mph).

== Racing history ==
=== BPR Global GT Series ===
Debuting at the 1995, BPR season opener at Jerez, three F1 GTRs took to the track (two for GTC Competition, one for David Price Racing's West Competition). The McLarens showed their speed from the very start, taking the first three qualifying spots. In the race, facing stiff competition from a Porsche 911 GT2 Evo, the McLaren F1 GTR of Ray Bellm and Maurizio Sandro Sala was able to take victory by a mere 16 seconds. For the second race, French squad BBA Competition added their new F1 GTR to the series while Bellm and Sala would again take victory. This would be followed by a victory for West Competition at Monza, then GTC winning again at the fourth round at Jarama. However at Jarama, GTC's second chassis, #04R would be badly damaged in a practice accident. This was replaced by #08R for the next race.

At next race at the Nürburgring, McLaren would successfully take the first five positions for GTC, West Competition, and new F1 GTR owners Giroix Racing Team and Mach One Racing. Following another victory at Donington, the F1 had a slight dry spell when it first lost to a Porsche in Montléry, then to a Ferrari at Anderstorp. However the F1 GTR would return to form by winning the final four races of the season. West Competition would take the teams championship with a total of two victories, while GTC would take third with five victories, and Mach One Racing fourth with three victories.

Going into 1996, McLaren debuted their upgraded cars in an attempt to continue their dominance of the series. Existing teams such as GTC Competition and Giroix Racing Team bought newer 1996-spec cars, while new teams such as BBA Competition, West Competition, and Mach One retained the older 1995-spec cars. BMW Motorsport, with the assistance of Bigazzi Team, purchased three F1 GTRs as well.

McLaren started the 1996 season in the same fashion as they had in 1995, with GTC Competition taking the first win in the hands of Ray Bellm and James Weaver. GTC, West Competition, and Mach One would trade off wins for the next three rounds until McLaren finally suffered a loss to Ferrari at Anderstorp yet again. GTC Competition would take victory again at Suzuka Circuit, but when the series arrived in Brands Hatch, the F1 GTR faced new competition. Porsche debuted their new 911 GT1, and took a strong victory in their first race. Although legally not allowed to score points at first, the 911 GT1 would still take victory again at Spa. Porsche skipped Nogaro, leaving McLaren to take the victory, but Porsche returned for the final round at Zhuhai, again taking the victory.

Even with the Porsche showing its dominance late in the season, McLaren's GTC Competition was still successful in taking the team's championship with West Competition taking third. For 1997, the BPR Global Endurance GT Championship would become the FIA GT Championship.

=== FIA GT Championship ===
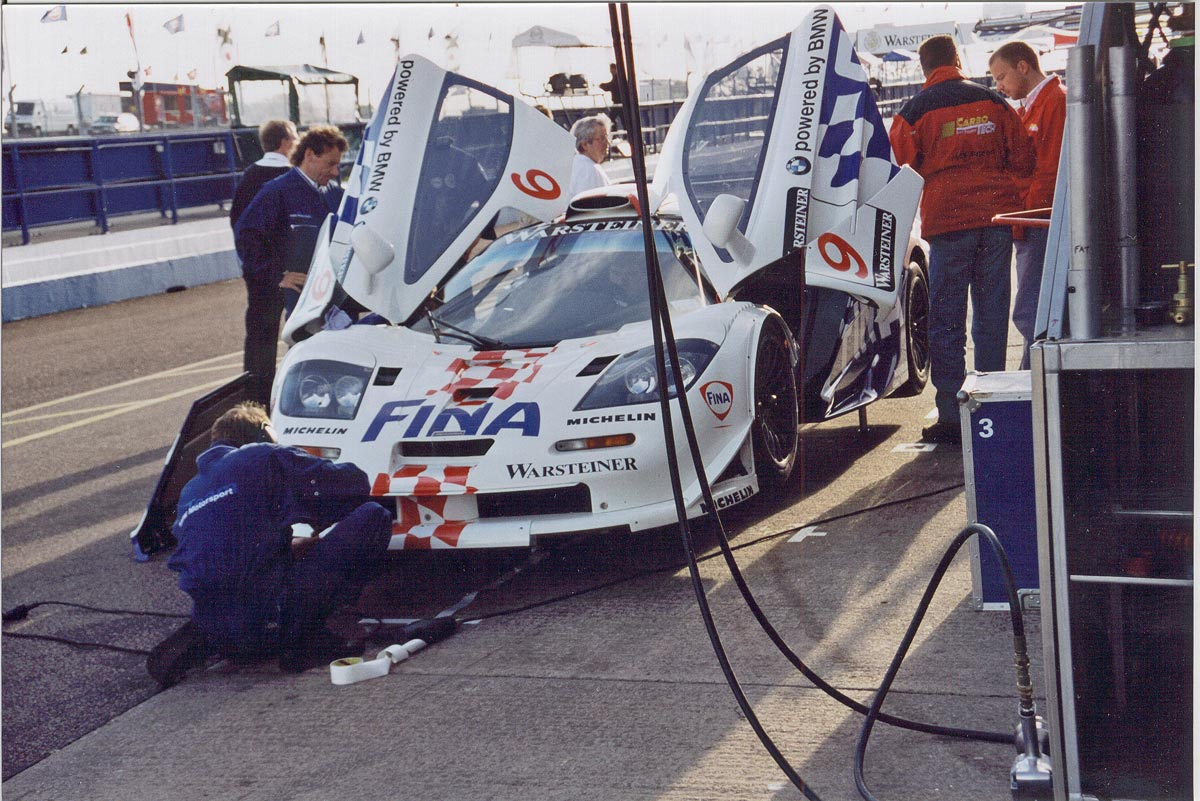
The BMW Motorsport entry during the 1997 FIA GT Donington 4 Hours race

Showing control of the BPR series early in 1996, McLaren now saw that their car was lacking against the likes of the new Porsche 911 GT1 in the all new FIA GT Championship. At the same time, McLaren was aware of the arrival of the new Mercedes-Benz CLK GTR, Lotus Elise GT1, and Panoz Esperante GTR-1, all purpose-built racing cars that bore little relation to road legal cars like the McLaren F1. The new F1 GTR "Long Tail" cars were therefore developed, and with increased assistance from BMW Motorsport, McLaren continued into the 1997 season. Major teams included the BMW Motorsport-backed Schnitzer Motorsport, Team Davidoff, and Parabolica Motorsports. Privateers continued to campaign older 1995-spec and 1996-spec cars.

At the opening round, the new Mercedes showed its pace by taking the pole in qualifying, but the car suffered mechanically during the race. The newer F1 GTRs showed that they had overcome the performance advantage of Porsche by taking a 1-2-3 victory over six trailing 911 GT1s. However, for the next round, Mercedes-Benz would be able to put up a fight against the McLarens, with a new CLK-GTR losing to BMW Motorsports F1 GTR by less than a second. At Helsinki, with a smaller field on the temporary street course and more mechanical woes for Mercedes, the BMW Motorsport McLaren again took victory.

Mercedes soon overcame their mechanical problems and took a 1-2 victory at the Nürburgring, ahead of five McLarens. McLaren was able to claw back a victory at Spa before the Mercedes again took over, taking 1-2 victories in the next three rounds. McLaren would take one final victory at Mugello before the Mercedes would take the final two victories of the year. BMW Motorsport, who had scored McLaren's only victories that year, managed second in the teams championships, while Team Davidoff took a distant third. Although McLaren had successfully outdone Porsche, they were simply unable to compete with the power of the new Mercedes-Benz.

BMW officially left the project at the end of 1997 in order to build their own Le Mans Prototype project, the BMW V12 LM. McLaren, realizing that the F1 could no longer compete against an even more evolved Mercedes CLK-LM, decided to pull out factory backing for 1998. Team Davidoff and Parabolica Motorsports, aligned with BBA Competition, attempted to continue with their aged cars in 1998, but could finish no better than fifth in a single race. Team Davidoff were the only ones to score points that season, finishing 6th in the teams championship. After 1998 the GT1 class was abolished due to the dominance by Mercedes-Benz, and McLaren F1s never raced in FIA GT again.

=== All Japan Grand Touring Championship ===
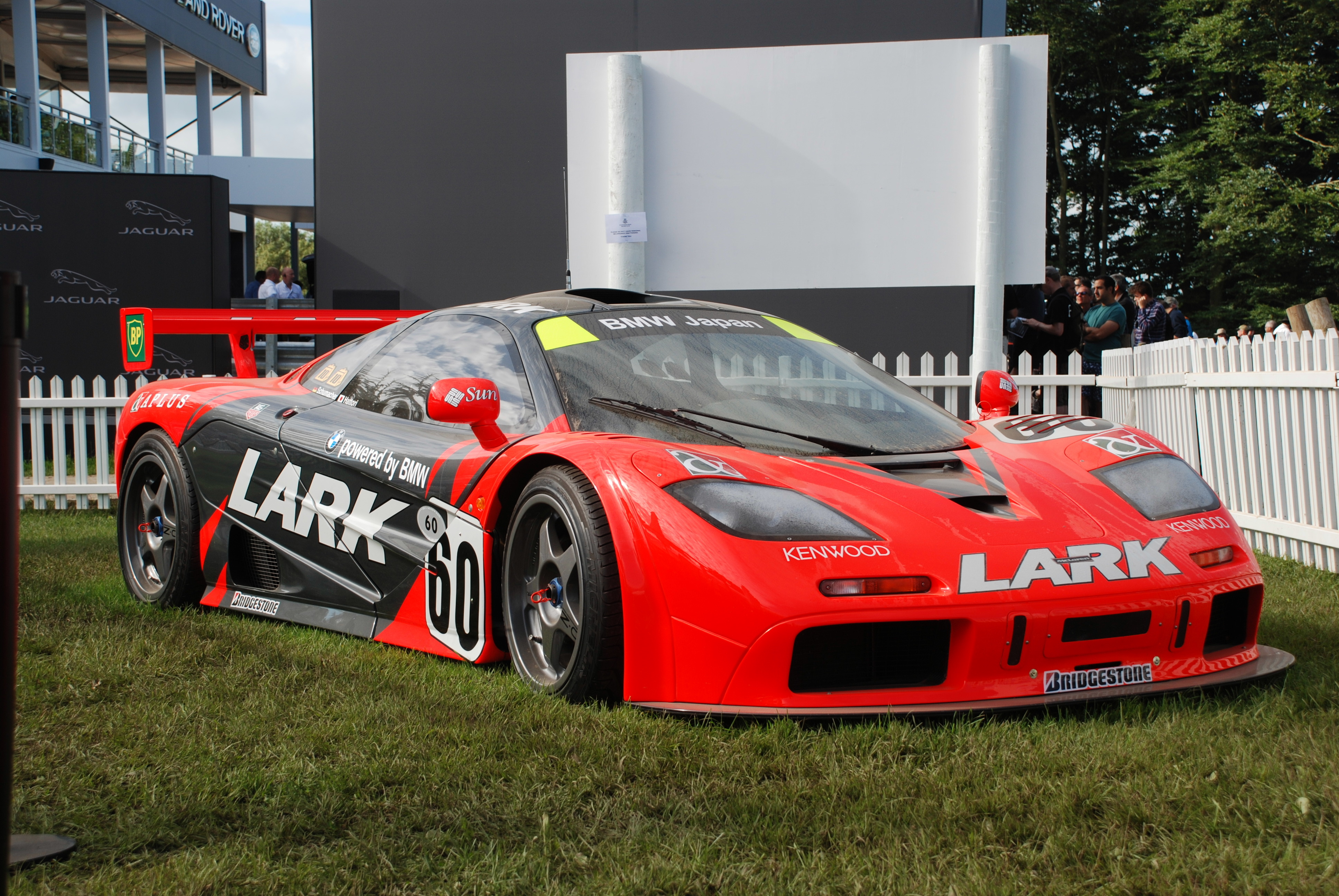
The 1996 F1 GTR of Team Lark on display

In 1996, Team Goh of Japan purchased two F1 GTRs of 1996-spec, chassis #13R and #14R, for participation in the All Japan Grand Touring Car Championship's (JGTC) GT500 class under the name Team Lark. Debuting at the opening round at Suzuka Circuit, the Lark team took a 1-2 finish, with winners Naoki Hattori and Ralf Schumacher. At the following round at Fuji, David Brabham and John Nielsen would take victory for the Lark McLaren. However, in the next two rounds, the Japanese rivals would overcome the McLarens, only to have Team Lark return to take victory in the final two rounds of the season. At the Sugo round, Lark badly damaged their one chassis, requiring them to borrow chassis #04R from GTC Competition as a replacement for the final JGTC round. With four victories on the season, Team Lark captured the GT500 teams championship ahead of factory squads from Toyota and Nissan. Team Lark's championship victory was the second season in JGTC/Super GT history where the GT500 class-winning car is not from a Japanese manufacturer; a Porsche 911 GT2 won the GT500 team's championship in 1995, although the driver championship was won by a Nissan driver that year.

Team Lark would not return to defend their title in 1997 due to disputes with GT Association over car handicaps, and no McLarens raced in the series. McLarens would return though in 1999 with Team Take One purchasing McLaren F1 GTR #19R, a 1997-spec car, for competition in GT500. The competition from Toyota, Honda, and Nissan had improved since the McLaren last raced, and therefore Team Take One struggled to be competitive, achieving only a best 9th place at Mine Circuit.

For 2000, Hitotsuyama Racing decided to follow Team Take One's lead and enter their own 1997-spec chassis, #25R, which the team had previously used in the 1999 Le Mans Fuji 1000km. Although both teams suffered mechanical woes throughout the season, Team Take One was able to take a fourth-place finish at TI Aida. Both teams continued into 2001, with the Take One McLaren outperforming the Hitotsuyama entry in most rounds. However a shock occurrence happened at the end of the season when the Take One McLaren was able to secure overall victory at Mine Circuit, a mere nine seconds ahead of a factory Nissan Skyline GT-R, and helping boost Team Take One to 8th in the teams championship.

For 2002, both teams would continue to campaign their F1 GTRs, with Hitotsuyama taking a best finish of 3rd at Motegi while Team Take One would suffer and eventually abandon their efforts at the end of the season. Hitotsuyama would continue on through 2003, only managing a best finish of 9th. The car would be retired at the end of 2003, yet Hitotsuyama decided to bring the car back for two brief appearances in 2005, failing to finish in the first race at Fuji then taking an 18th on the series' return to Fuji before being retired for good by Hitotsuyama. This would be the final McLaren F1 GTR in competition in the world.

=== BRDC GT Championship ===
Starting in 1996, with the expansion of the BRDC GT Championship (later known as British GT), the Lanzante Motorsports team saw an opportunity to purchase a former GTC Competition F1 GTR of 1995-spec. Although quick enough to take six pole positions over the season, the team struggled during races, managing only a single victory against a large variety of sportscars. Although drivers Ian Flux and Jake Ulrich managed to easily take the GT1 class drivers championship, the pair failed to beat out GT2 and GT3 class teams for the overall championship. Following the season, Lanzante abandoned the McLaren, and only a one-off race by Parabolica Motorsports saw the only competition by a McLaren in 1997.

In 1998, British GT changed it rules to more closely compare to those used by the FIA GT Championship. These rule changes saw the return of a McLaren to British GT, with Steve O'Rourke's EMKA Racing running a 1997-spec chassis, and later joined by Team Carl at Silverstone. EMKA would manage to take two race victories, and drivers Tim Sugden and Steve O'Rourke would take second in the overall drivers championship.

For 1999, although the FIA GT Championship had abandoned the GT1 class, British GT continued to allow the cars to run. EMKA Racing continued with AM Racing joining with another 1997-spec car before they were forced to drop out halfway through the season. EMKA managed a mere single victory, consistently being beaten by Porsche 911 GT1s and Lister Storms. For 2000, British GT finally abandoned their GT1 class, and the McLaren F1 GTRs were no longer eligible.

=== 24 Hours of Le Mans ===
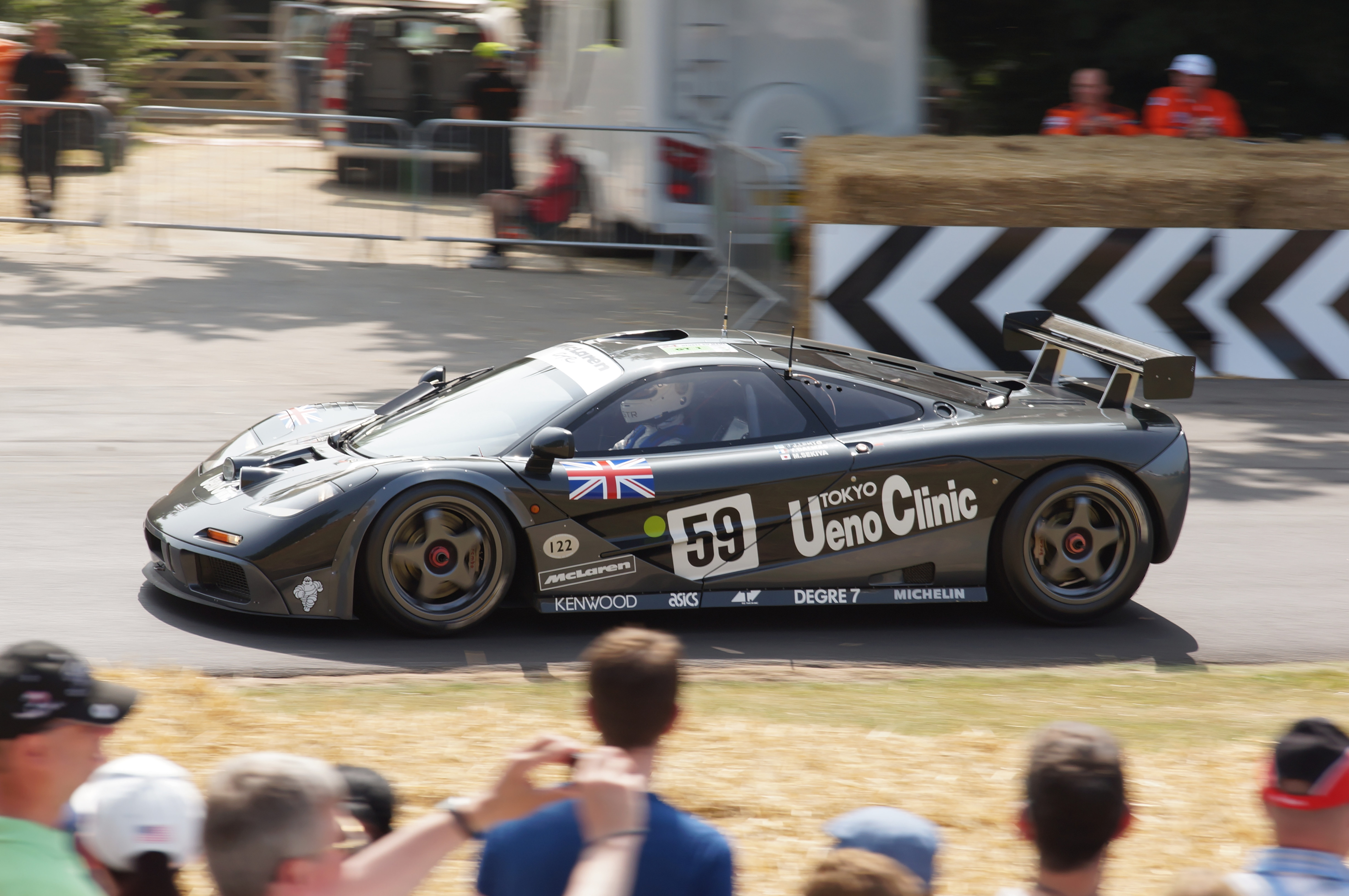
The 1995 24 Hours of LeMans winning McLaren F1 GTR (chassis #01R) raced by Lanzante Motorsport (Kokusai Kaihatsu Racing)

Although officially not part of any one racing series, the 24 Hours of Le Mans was still considered important enough for McLaren to enter. Competing at Le Mans meant racing against many of their normal GT1 competitors from various series, as well as some unique cars which ran Le Mans only. McLaren first ran Le Mans in 1995, with all seven chassis built at the time being entered. Although only six cars were being used in the BPR Global GT Series, chassis #01R which had been used as a McLaren testbed was also entered for the Kokusai Kaihatsu Racing team.

Prior to the race, it was assumed that one of the competitors in the WSC class of Le Mans Prototype would easily take the win, since they were custom built racing cars with no relation to street cars like GT1 cars. However, during the race, various WSC cars succumbed to technical difficulties and dropped well down in the standings, while the GT1 class cars continued on without difficulty. In the closing hours of the race, five McLaren F1 GTRs were still racing while only three WSC cars remained. A close battle in the final hours saw the Kokusai Kaihatsu McLaren competing against the Courage Compétition prototype, with the McLaren finally taking the overall win in one of the shortest distances covered since the 1950s. Other McLarens finished 3rd, 4th, 5th, and 13th overall, with only two F1 GTRs failing to finish. In honor of McLaren's achievement, the company developed five special F1 LMs for customers to mark the five finishers. The winning car, which was driven by Yannick Dalmas, Masanori Sekiya, and JJ Lehto, was retained by McLaren and never raced again.

Returning in 1996, competition from the Le Mans Prototypes was stiffer as Porsche had a factory team in the class. GT1 class itself was also more competitive, again with Porsche having a factory team with their new 911 GT1s. McLaren had seven entries again, but were unable to repeat on their success, although they were only beaten by the two new 911 GT1s and the overall winning Porsche LMP. Six of the seven McLarens finished, taking the 4th, 5th, 6th, 8th, 9th, and 11th places.

With the upgraded 1997-spec cars, McLaren returned with six entries the following year. Now facing not only Porsche, but also Lister, Panoz, and Nissan, the McLarens again performed well. Only two entries managed to finish, taking 2nd and 3rd overall (1st and 2nd in the GT class) behind the repeat winner, the Porsche LMP. In 1998, only two McLaren F1 GTRs were entered, both by privateer teams, with only one car managing a fourth place.

The following year, the GT1 class was abandoned and the McLarens no longer eligible. However, in an ACO sanctioned event in Japan in 1999, a McLaren F1 GTR was entered by Hitotsuyama Racing in the new LMGTP class for closed-cockpit prototypes. Had the McLaren won its class, it would have earned an automatic entry to Le Mans as a prototype in 2000, however the car failed to finish and the eventual class winner, a Toyota GT-One, declined the automatic invitation as Toyota decided to end the GT-One program in favour of Formula One.

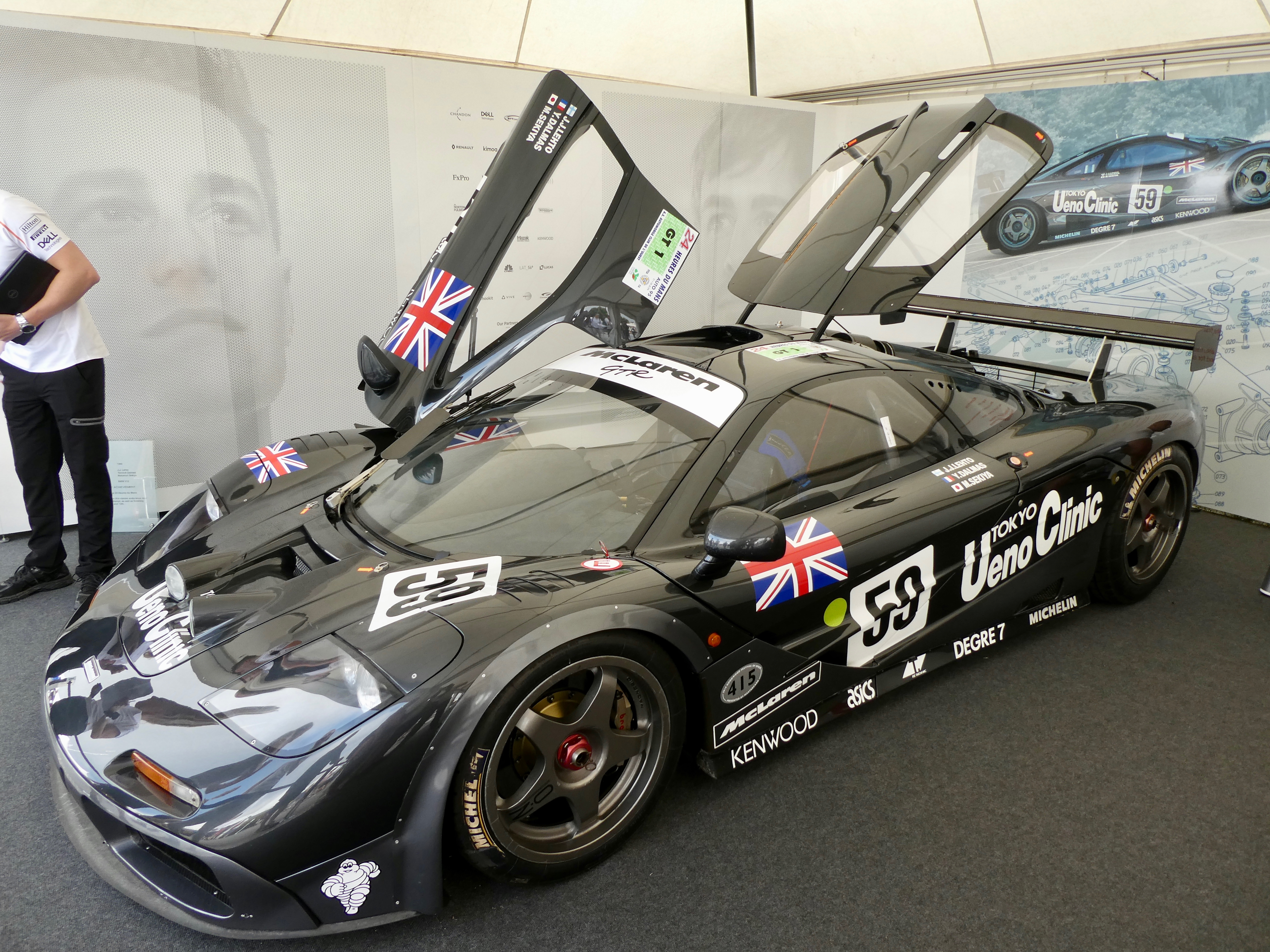
McLaren F1 GTR

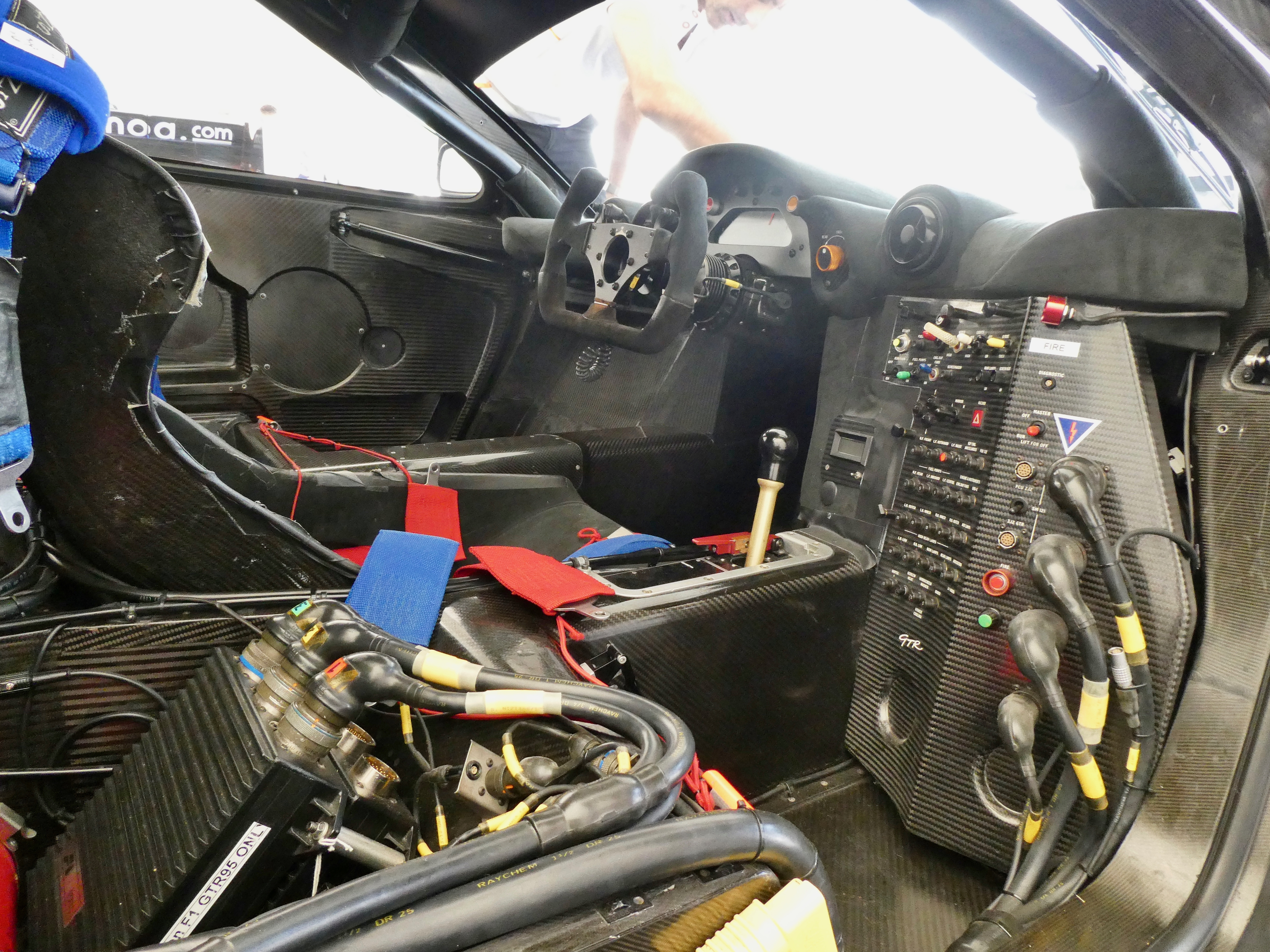
McLaren F1 GTR Interior

=== Other competitions ===
At the close of the 1996 seasons, Bigazzi Team SRL, Giroix Racing Team, and David Price Racing took their F1 GTRs to Brazil to compete in races at Curitiba and Brasília. Bigazzi took both victories just ahead of the other two McLarens. Bigazzi would return to Brazil again in 1997 to take victory at the Mil Milhas.

Team Davidoff raced in a number of events outside of the mainstream in 1997, appearing at the 6 Hours of Vallelunga with drivers Thomas Bscher and John Nielsen (racing driver) taking a 21 lap victory over the nearest competitor. Later, the car appeared at the Le Mans Autumn Cup, finishing second in combined heat races. BBA Competition would fly to China for the FIA GT exhibition event at Zhuhai, taking second.

In 1998, for the short lived GTR Euroseries for privateers, Davidoff raced their F1 GTR in the opening round at Jarama, taking a dominating victory. The following week, the car was brought to the opening round of the 1998 Italian GT season, the 1000km of Monza. Davidoff's McLaren was able to defeat open cockpit prototypes to take overall victory by eleven laps. The car appeared one last time at the final race of the GTR Euroseries season, a four-hour race at Spa. The car was forced to retire with a blown head gasket.

== Later use ==
Following the end of competition for most F1 GTRs in 1998, the various chassis were put to different uses. Some cars, such as the Le Mans-winning chassis #01R, were put on public exhibition at motor shows or in museums. Others were bought by private collectors, either for storage or for use by their owners in historic track day competition, such as the GT90s Revival Series which mainly involved former BPR Global GT Series competitors.

A handful of GTRs were not only bought by private owners, but also extensively modified by McLaren to make them street-legal. In order to meet regulations, the cars were required to have their ride heights increased, as well as a change from a racing fuel tank and inlet to a more traditional tank and fuel cap. The air restrictor on the engine was also removed, allowing the BMW engines to produce their full potential power. Comforts such as the production car's sound deadening system, and even sometimes the two passenger seats, were left out of the car. These modified McLaren F1 GTRs are considered the ultimate versions of the road car, since they weigh considerably less than any of the other street cars. Several F1 GTRs in this form are still driven today.

Street-legal conversions

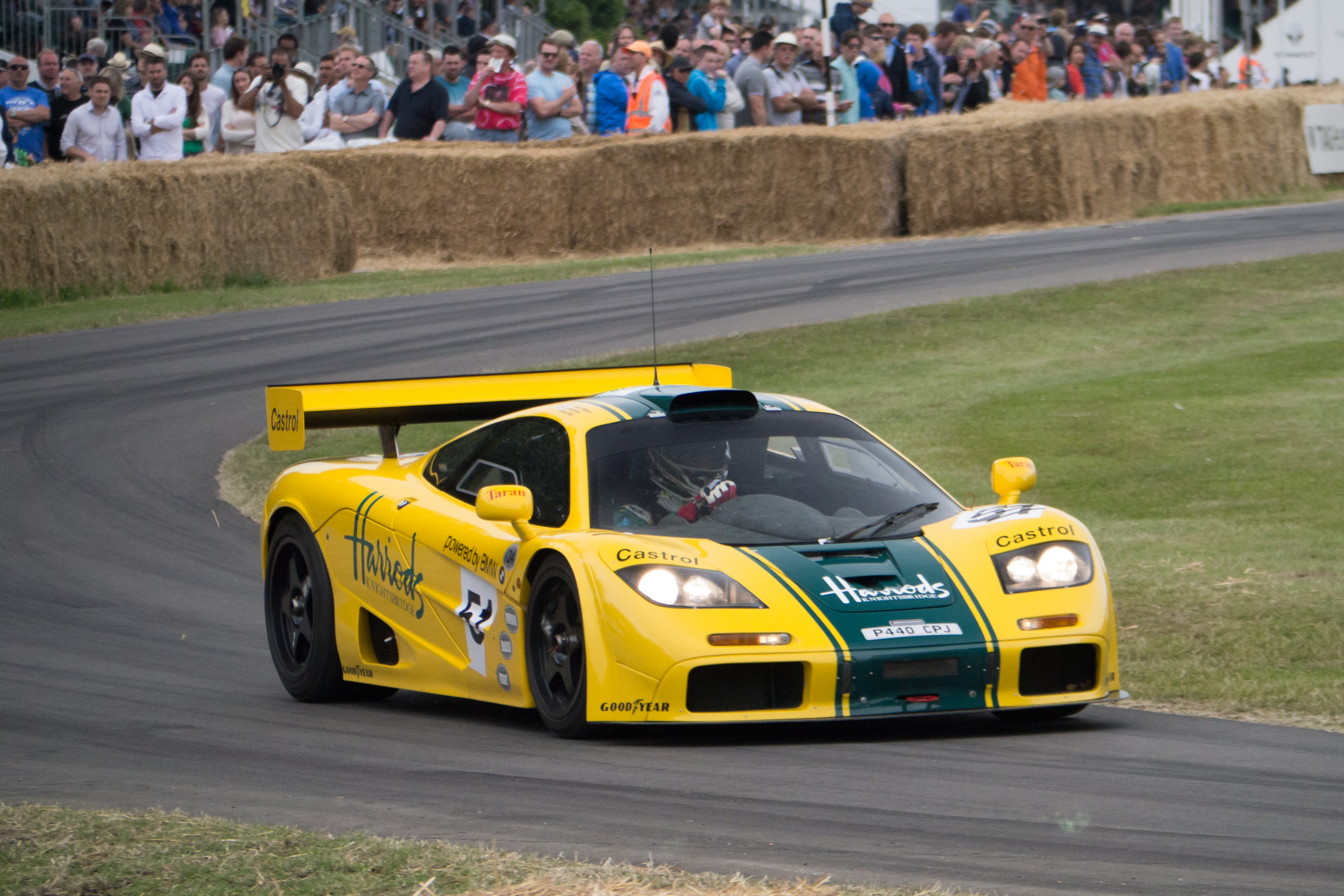

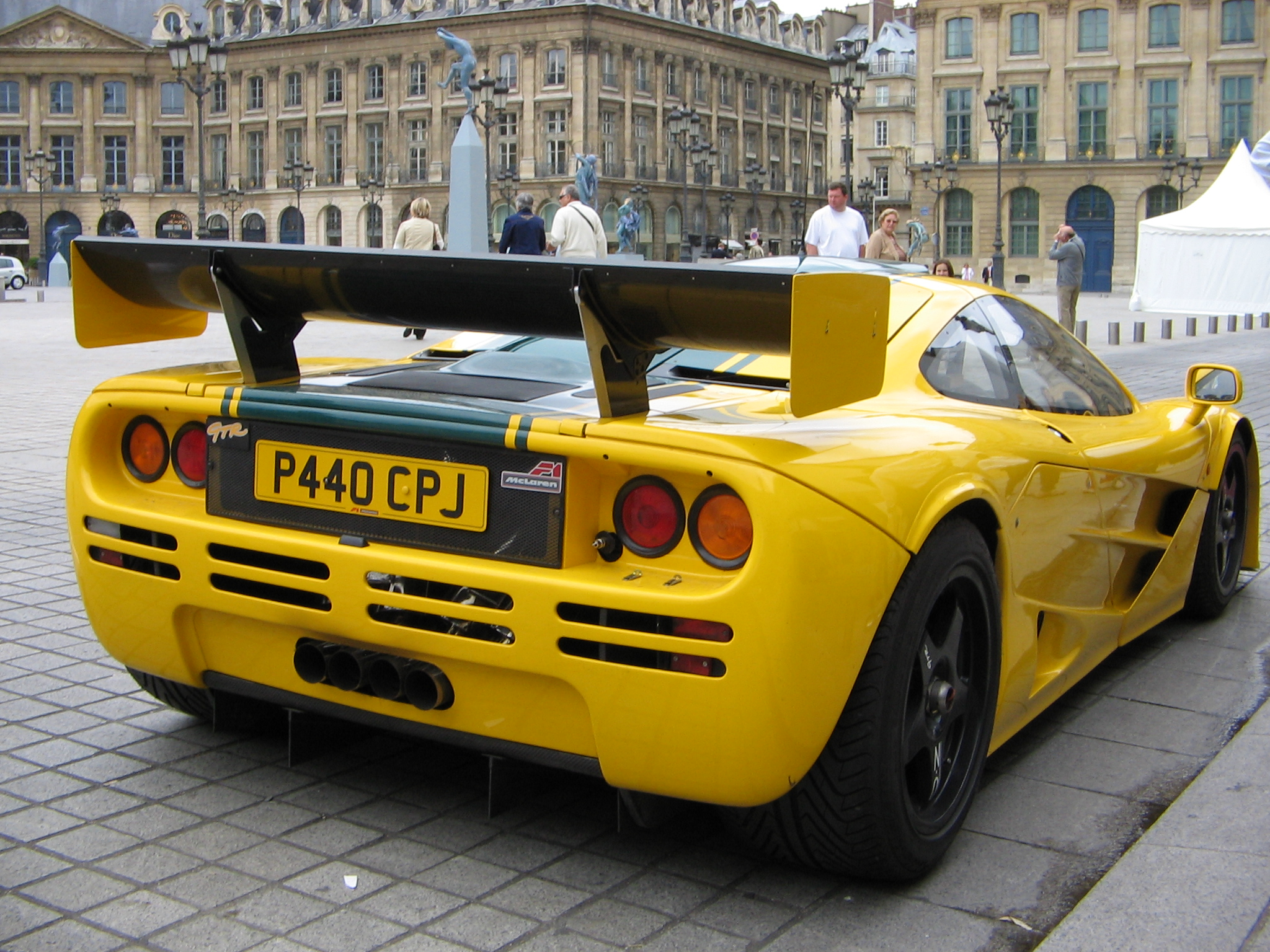
The #06R chassis with 1996-spec

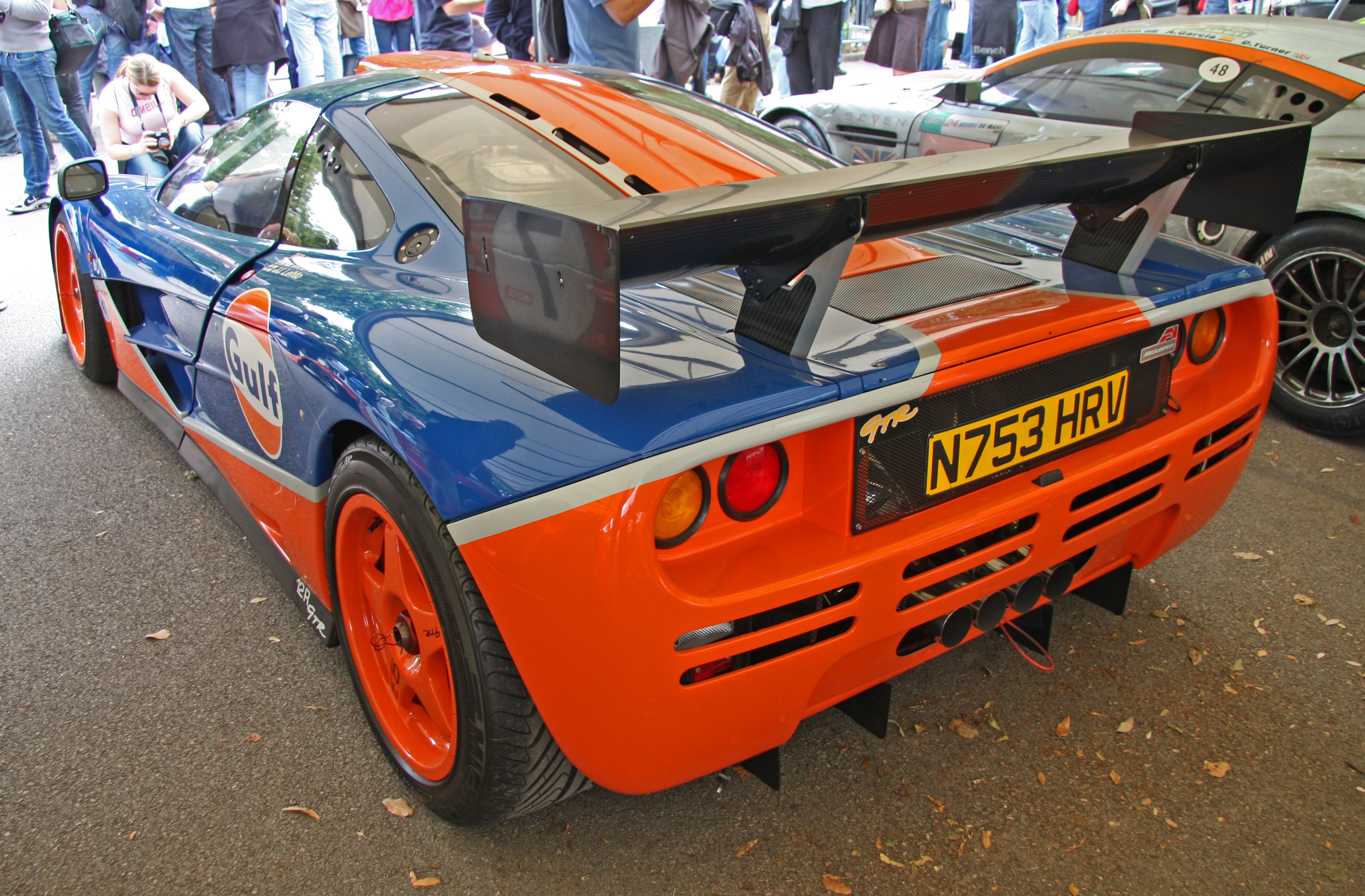

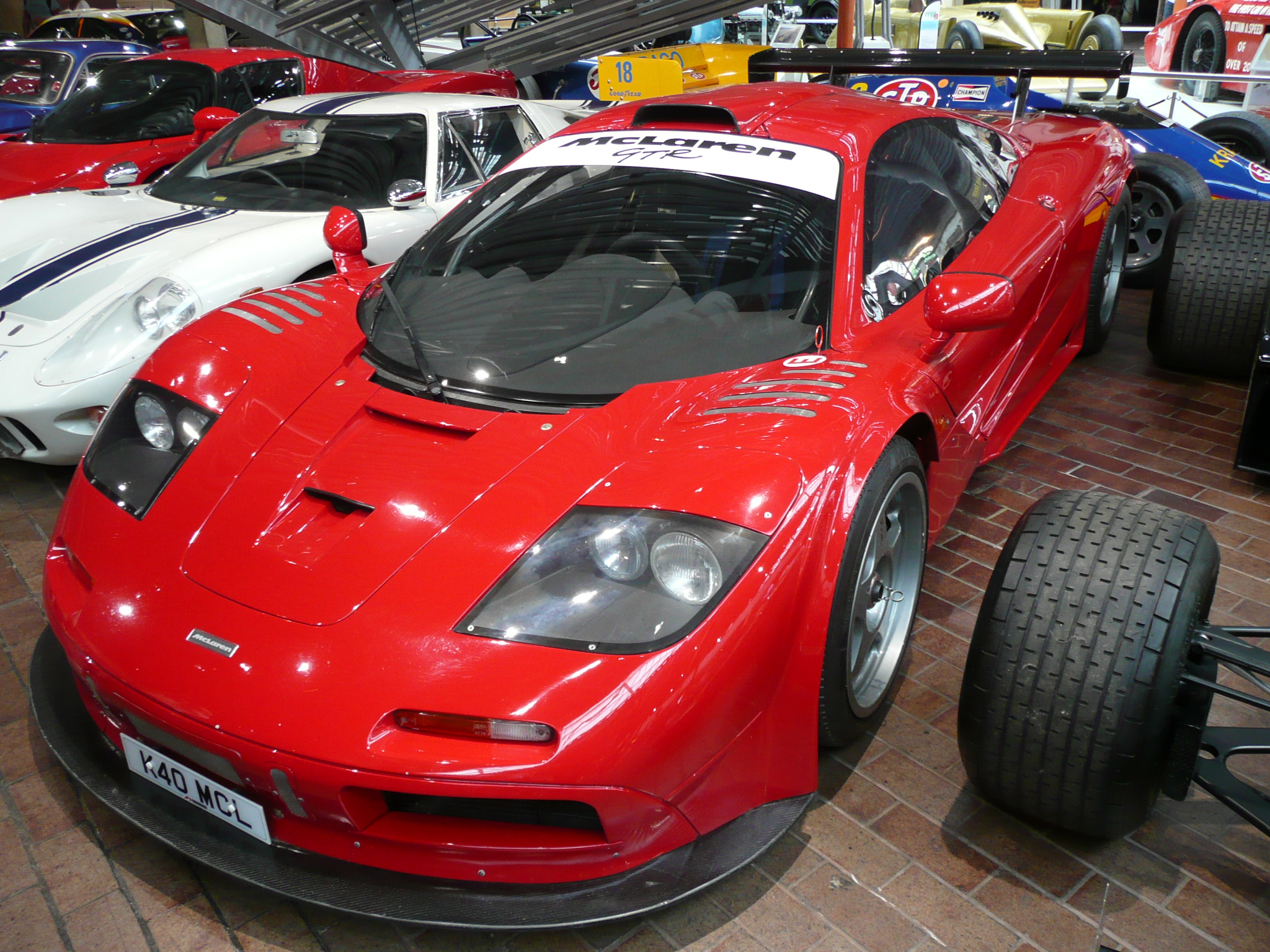
The first 1996-spec #10R chassis

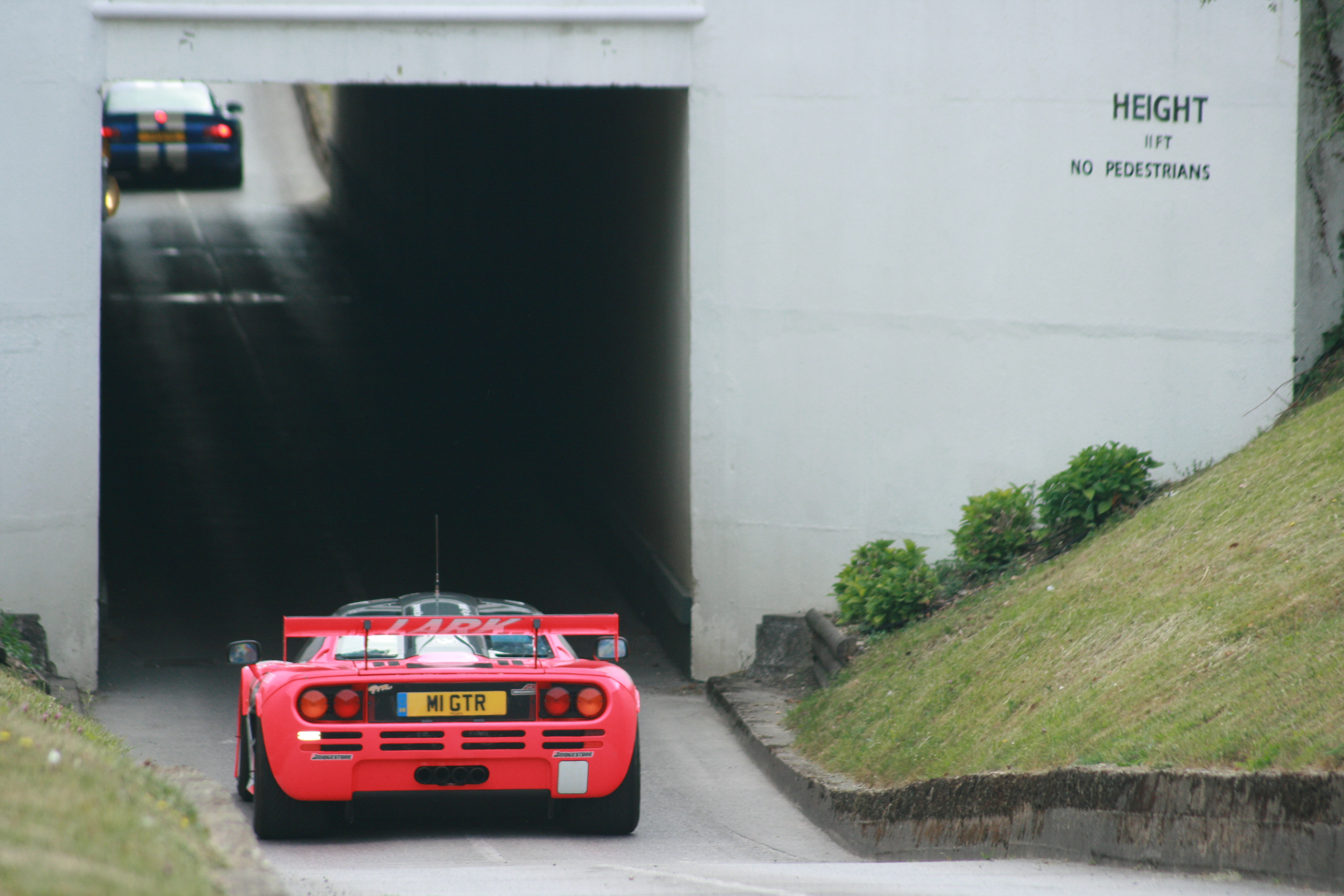

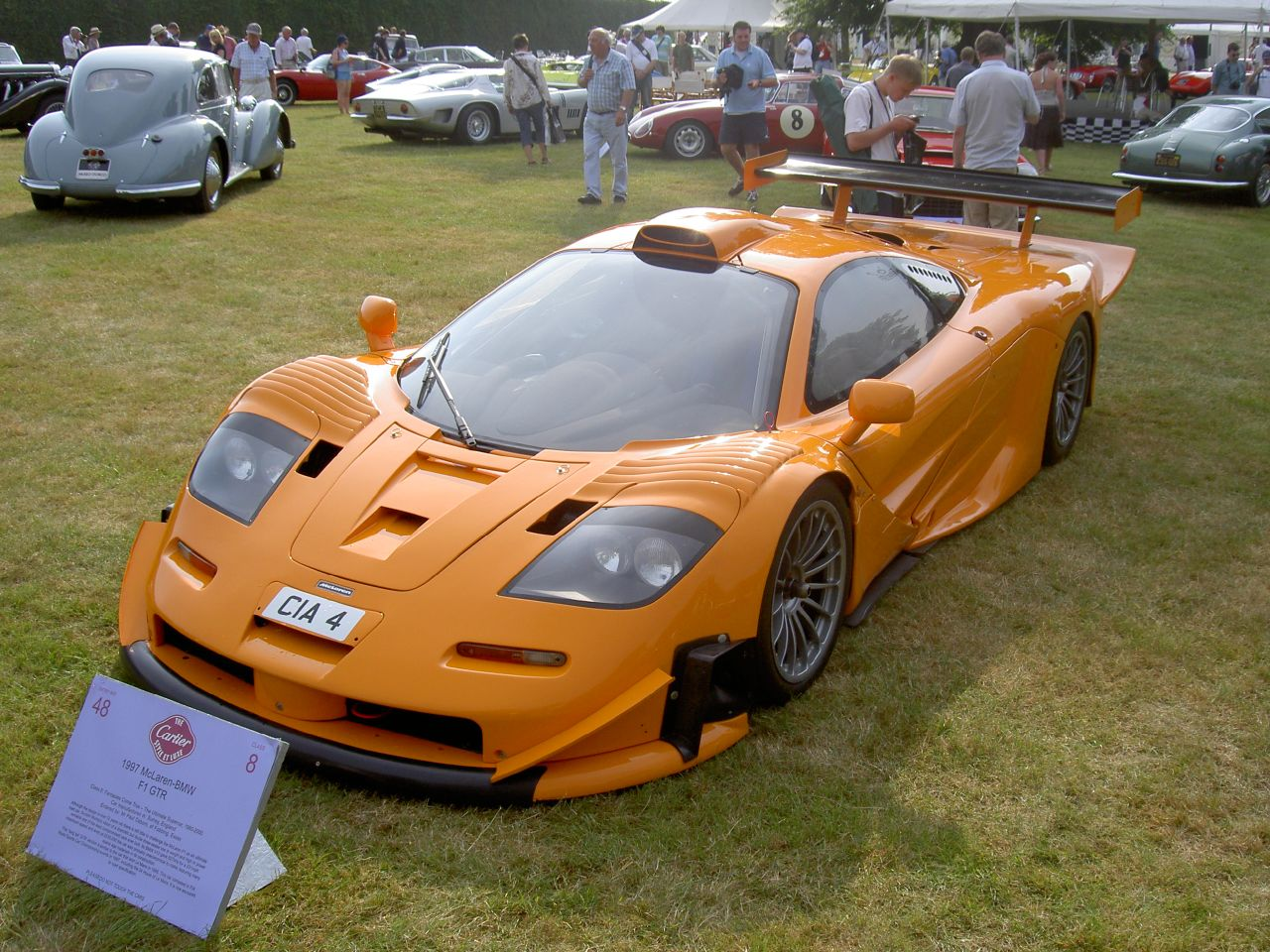
The #27R chassis, which is a F1 GTR Longtail.

== Chassis ==
A total of 28 F1 GTR chassis were built. Nine were built in 1995-spec, nine in 1996-spec, and ten more in 1997-spec. Some cars were upgraded from one spec to another, but this count only includes cars built from scratch to that specification.

=== In detail ===
| Chassis Number | Description |
|---|---|
| #01R | Modified from road car chassis #019 and used as McLaren test car. Raced by Lanzante Motorsport ("Kokusai Kaihatsu Racing") in the 1995 24 Hours of Le Mans, scoring the overall win. Retired from racing immediately after and kept by McLaren Cars. |
| #02R | Modified from road car chassis #026 for GTC Competition ("Gulf Racing") for BPR in 1995, scoring 5 wins and finishing 3rd in teams championship. 4th at 1995 24 Hours of Le Mans. Sold to Lanzante Motorsport and campaigned in British GT in 1996, scoring one win and the GT1 drivers championship. |
| #03R | Modified from road car chassis #027 for David Price Racing ("West Racing") for BPR in 1995, scoring 3 wins and winning the teams championship. Did not finish 1995 24 Hours of Le Mans. Upgraded to 1996-spec and continued in BPR in 1996, taking another two wins, finishing 3rd in teams championship. 4th at 1996 24 Hours of Le Mans. Finished 3rd at Curitiba and 4th at Brasilia. |
| #04R | Built for GTC Competition ("Gulf Racing") for BPR in 1995, badly damaged in practice at Jarama, replaced on the team by #08R. Sold to Team Goh in 1996 to replace their damaged #014R and only participated in final round of the JGTC season. |
| #05R | Built for BBA Competition for BPR in 1995, finished 10th in teams championship. Finished 13th at 1995 24 Hours of Le Mans. Continued in BPR in 1996, finished 24th in teams championship. Continued in FIA GT in 1997, failed to score points. Continued in FIA GT in 1998 running jointly with Parabolica Motorsport, failing to score points. Sold in 2010 to UK. |
| #06R | Built for David Price Racing ("Harrods Mach One Racing") for BPR in 1995, scoring 3 wins and finishing 4th in teams championship. Finished 3rd at 1995 24 Hours of Le Mans. Upgraded to 1996-spec and continued in BPR in 1996, scoring 1 win and finishing 8th in teams championship. Finished 6th at 1996 24 Hours of Le Mans. Sold to Martin Vehle Racing, raced in FIA GT in 1997, failing to score points. Now owned by David Clark, former Sales Director of McLaren Cars. |
| #07R | Built for Giroix Racing Team ("GRT Jacadi") for BPR in 1995, finished 13th in teams championship. Finished 5th at 1995 24 Hours of Le Mans. Sold to private owner in the UK |
| #08R | Originally intended for Lanzante Motorsport but was sold to GTC Competition ("Gulf Racing") to replace their damaged chassis #04R. Competed in later half of BPR in 1995. Did not finish 1995 24 Hours of Le Mans. Only competed in the first race of BPR in 1996. |
| #09R | Sold to the Sultan of Brunei Hassanal Bolkiah. Painted nearly identical to the Kokusai Kaihatsu Le Mans winning car. No competition history. |
| #10R | First 1996-spec car. Built as a test and development car to replace retired #01R. Used at 1996 24 Hours of Le Mans pre-qualifying but did not race. Later converted to street-legal use and sold to Nick Mason. The front of the chassis was damaged after a wreck during a demonstration lap at Goodwood Circuit's 75th Member's Meeting. Sold in 2026 with record-breaking $34,655,000. |
| #11R | Built for Giroix Racing Team ("Franck Muller Racing") for BPR in 1996, finished 11th in teams championship. Raced as "Kokusai Kaihatsu Racing" at 1996 24 Hours of Le Mans but did not finish. Finished 2nd at Monza. Finished 2nd at Curitaba and Brasilia. Sold to Larbre Compétition for 1996 but never raced, later sold to Mercedes-AMG where it was used as a testbed and Extensively modified with custom bodywork in order to test aerodynamics for the upcoming CLK GTR race car. Later returned to McLaren and converted to road use and painted in papaya colour. Owned by a private car collector in Europe. |
| #12R | Built for GTC Competition ("Gulf Racing") for BPR in 1996, scoring 4 wins and winning the teams championship. Converted to road car for Ray Bellm, later sold to Aaron Hsu. |
| #13R | Built for Team Goh ("Team Lark McLaren") for JGTC in 1996, scoring 3 victories and winning the teams championship. |
| #14R | Built for Team Goh ("Team Lark McLaren") for JGTC in 1996, scoring 1 victory before being destroyed in an accident at Sugo. Replaced by refurbished chassis #04R and later converted to a street car. |
| #15R | Built for GTC Motorsport ("Gulf Racing") in BPR in 1996, finishing 6th in teams championship. Finished 5th in 1996 24 Hours of Le Mans. |
| #16R | Built for Bigazzi Team SRL, competed in Silverstone round of BPR in 1996 finishing 11th. Finished 11th at 1996 24 Hours of Le Mans. Later converted for street use and sold to Chris Palmer. Since sold. Tested by Tiff Needell on Fifth Gear. |
| #17R | Built for Bigazzi Team SRL, competed in Silverstone round of BPR in 1996 finishing 4th. Finished 8th at 1996 24 Hours of Le Mans. Owned by BMW North America. |
| #18R | Built for Bigazzi Team SRL, competed in exhibition rounds at Curitiba and Brasilia, winning both races in 1996, then winning the Brazilian Mil Milhas in 1997. Owned by BMW AG. |
| #19R | First 1997-spec car. Built as a test and development car to replace the sold #10R. Used by Team Goh in 1997 FIA GT race at Suzuka finishing 9th. Sold to Team Take One for the 1999 JGTC season, scoring one victory in 2001 before ending competition in 2002. |
| #20R | Built for GTC Competition ("Gulf Team Davidoff") for FIA GT in 1997, finishing 3rd in the teams championship. Finished 2nd at 1997 24 Hours of Le Mans. |
| #21R | Built for BMW Motorsport/Schnitzer Motorsport for FIA GT in 1997, scoring two wins and finishing 2nd in the teams championship. Sold to Team Carl Racing in 1998 for British GT, raced only at Silverstone, finishing 8th. |
| #22R | Built for GTC Competition ("Gulf Team Davidoff") for FIA GT in 1997, finishing 3rd in the teams championship. Won the 6 Hours of Vallelunga. Did not start the 1997 24 Hours of Le Mans due to a fire in practice, underwent extensive repairs. Returned at the Le Mans Autumn Cup, finishing 2nd. Continued in FIA GT into 1998, finishing 6th in teams championship. Won opening round of GTR Euroserie. Won the 1000 km of Monza. Did not finish the 1998 24 Hours of Le Mans. Failed to finish at the GTR Euroserie finale at Spa. |
| #23R | Built for BMW Motorsport/Schnitzer Motorsport for FIA GT in 1997, winning 1 race and finishing 2nd in the teams championship. |
| #24R | Built for BMW Motorsport/Schnitzer Motorsport but lent to GTC Competition to temporarily replace #22R while it was under repair. Failed to finish at 1997 24 Hours of Le Mans. Sold to EMKA Racing for use in the 1998 British GT Championship, scoring 2 wins and winning the GT1 drivers championship. Finished 4th at 1998 24 Hours of Le Mans. Continued in British GT in 1999, scoring 1 win and finishing third in the GT1 drivers championship. Currently in use in the GT90s Revival historic racing series. |
| #25R | Built for GTC Competition ("Gulf Team Davidoff") for FIA GT in 1997. Failed to finish at 1997 24 Hours of Le Mans. Sold to Hitotsuyama Racing in 1999. Failed at finish at 1999 Le Mans Fuji 1000km. Entered in JGTC for 2000 until the end of 2003. Returned for two JGTC races at Fuji in 2005. |
| #26R | Built for BMW Motorsport/Schnitzer Motorsport for FIA GT in 1997, scoring 2 wins and finishing 2nd in the teams championship. Finished 3rd at 1997 24 Hours of Le Mans. |
| #27R | Built for Parabolica Motorsport for FIA GT in 1997, finishing 7th in the teams championship. Run by Team Goh at 1997 24 Hours of Le Mans but failed to finish. Sold to AM Racing for British GT in 1999. Sold at Brooks auction at Goodwood Festival of Speed. |
| #28R | Originally chassis #27R but damaged in transport. Chassis plate was moved to chassis that is now known as #27R. Rebuilt for GTC Competition as spare car, raced late in FIA GT in 1997. Chassis 28R would win the 2016 "Spirit of The Quail Award" at the Quail Concours, a show part of Monterey Car Week. |

=== 24 Hours of Le Mans results ===
| Year | Team | Drivers | Chassis # | Car # | Class | Laps | Pos. | Class Pos. |
|---|---|---|---|---|---|---|---|---|
| 1995 | (United Kingdom) GTC Gulf Racing | (United Kingdom) Mark Blundell (United Kingdom) Ray Bellm (Brazil) Maurizio Sandro Sala | #02R | 24 | GT1 | 291 | 4th | 3rd |
| 1995 | (United Kingdom) GTC Gulf Racing | (France) Pierre-Henri Raphanel (France) Philippe Alliot (United Kingdom) Lindsay Owen-Jones | #08R | 25 | GT1 | 77 | DNF | DNF |
| 1995 | (France) BBA Competition | (France) Jean-Luc Maury-Laribière (France) Marc Sourd (France) Hervé Poulain | #05R | 42 | GT1 | 266 | 13th | 7th |
| 1995 | (United Kingdom) David Price Racing (United Kingdom) West Competition | (Germany) Thomas Bscher (Denmark) John Nielsen (Germany) Jochen Mass | #03R | 49 | GT1 | 131 | DNF | DNF |
| 1995 | (France) Giroix Racing Team Jacadi | (France) Fabien Giroix (Switzerland) Jean-Denis Délétraz (France) Olivier Grouillard | #07R | 50 | GT1 | 290 | 5th | 4th |
| 1995 | (United Kingdom) David Price Racing (United Kingdom) Mach One Racing | (United Kingdom) Andy Wallace (United Kingdom) Derek Bell (United Kingdom) Justin Bell | #06R | 51 | GT1 | 296 | 3rd | 2nd |
| 1995 | (United Kingdom) Lanzante Motorsport (Japan) Kokusai Kaihatsu UK | (France) Yannick Dalmas (Finland) JJ Lehto (Japan) Masanori Sekiya | #01R | 59 | GT1 | 298 | 1st | 1st |
| 1996 | (United Kingdom) David Price Racing (United Kingdom) Mach One Racing | (United Kingdom) Andy Wallace (United Kingdom) Derek Bell (France) Olivier Grouillard | #06R | 29 | GT1 | 328 | 6th | 5th |
| 1996 | (United Kingdom) David Price Racing (United Kingdom) West Competition | (Germany) Thomas Bscher (Denmark) John Nielsen (Netherlands) Peter Kox | #03R | 30 | GT1 | 338 | 4th | 3rd |
| 1996 | (United Kingdom) Gulf Racing | (United Kingdom) Ray Bellm (United Kingdom) James Weaver (Finland) JJ Lehto | #05R | 33 | GT1 | 323 | 9th | 7th |
| 1996 | (United Kingdom) Gulf Racing | (France) Pierre-Henri Raphanel (Australia) David Brabham (United Kingdom) Lindsay Owen-Jones | #15R | 34 | GT1 | 335 | 5th | 4th |
| 1996 | (Italy) Team Bigazzi (Germany) Team BMW Motorsport | (France) Fabien Giroix (Switzerland) Jean-Denis Délétraz (France) Olivier Grouillard | #16R | 38 | GT1 | 290 | 11th | 9th |
| 1996 | (Italy) Team Bigazzi (United States) BMW North America | (Venezuela) Johnny Cecotto (Brazil) Nelson Piquet (United States) Danny Sullivan | #17R | 39 | GT1 | 296 | 8th | 6th |
| 1996 | (France) BBA Competition (United Kingdom) Kokusai Kaihatsu UK | (France) Yannick Dalmas (Finland) JJ Lehto (Japan) Masanori Sekiya | #11R | 53 | GT1 | 146 | DNF | DNF |
| 1997 | (United Kingdom) GTC/Gulf Team Davidoff | (United Kingdom) Ray Bellm (United Kingdom) Andrew Gilbert-Scott (Japan) Masanori Sekiya | #25R | 39 | GT1 | 326 | DNF | DNF |
| 1997 | (United Kingdom) GTC/Gulf Team Davidoff | (Germany) Thomas Bscher (Denmark) John Nielsen (United Kingdom) Chris Goodwin | #22R | 40 | GT1 | 0 | DNS | DNS |
| 1997 | (United Kingdom) GTC/Gulf Team Davidoff | (France) Pierre-Henri Raphanel (France) Jean-Marc Gounon (Sweden) Anders Olofsson | #20R | 41 | GT1 | 360 | 2nd | 1st |
| 1997 | (Germany) Team Schnitzer (Germany) BMW Motorsport | (Finland) JJ Lehto (United Kingdom) Steve Soper (Brazil) Nelson Piquet | #24R | 42 | GT1 | 236 | DNF | DNF |
| 1997 | (Germany) Team Schnitzer (Germany) BMW Motorsport | (Italy) Roberto Ravaglia (Netherlands) Peter Kox (France) Éric Hélary | #26R | 43 | GT1 | 358 | 3rd | 2nd |
| 1997 | (Japan) Team Lark (United Kingdom) Parabolica Motorsport | (United Kingdom) Gary Ayles (Japan) Keiichi Tsuchiya (Japan) Akihiko Nakaya | #27R | 44 | GT1 | 88 | DNF | DNF |
| 1998 | (United Kingdom) GTC/Gulf Team Davidoff | (United Kingdom) Tim Sugden (United States) Bill Auberlen (United Kingdom) Steve O'Rourke | #24R | 40 | GT1 | 343 | 4th | 4th |
| 1998 | (United Kingdom) GTC/Gulf Team Davidoff | (Germany) Thomas Bscher (Italy) Emanuele Pirro (Italy) Rinaldo Capello | #22R | 41 | GT1 | 228 | DNF | DNF |
