= JAF Grand Prix =

The JAF Grand Prix (JAFグランプリ) is an auto race held in Japan by the Japan Automobile Federation.

== History ==
The original JAF Grand Prix was set up in year 1969 as to promoting Formula Car events in Japan, which was the highest ranked race other than the Japanese Grand Prix. The first race in 1969 was a Formula Libre event and was won by Australian driver Leo Geoghegan driving an ex-Jim Clark Lotus 39-Repco V8. The 1970 race was won by reigning Formula One World Champion Jackie Stewart driving a Brabham-Ford.

Then, after a brief suspension from 1971 to 1973 due to a scandal, it was held as a points-scoring round in Formula 2000, Formula Two, and Formula Pacific series until 1986. From 1988 to 1990, the JAF Grand Prix was a round of the All Japan Sports Prototype Championship. The JAF Grand Prix then went on hiatus for two decades.

In 2010, the JAF Grand Prix was revived by the JAF and named after its venue, Fuji Speedway, as the JAF Grand Prix and Fuji Sprint Cup. It served as a non-title season-ending race for the Formula Nippon and Super GT series. Teams which participated in five rounds in either series were eligible for their respective JAF Grand Prix events. The ruleset used in the Grand Prix differed from those used in regular-season Formula Nippon and Super GT events.

- The JAF GP consisted of six separate races in 2010 and five races from 2011 to 2013; two each for Super GT's GT500 and GT300 classes, and one (two in 2010) for Formula Nippon. The race distance was about 100 km, less than half of the typical regular-season race distance. There were no mandated pit stops.
- In 2010, qualifying results for the second Formula Nippon race were decided by top speed (measured at the end of the straight) rather than lap time. In 2011, grid positions were determined by a score based on top speed and lap time. Qualifying results for the 2012 and 2013 races were decided by lap times, as in the regular season.
- In the Super GT races, the two drivers in every team drove in two separate races, instead of sharing a car in a single race as in the regular season.
- As in the final round in the regular Super GT season, success ballast was not applied to Super GT participants. However, a standing start, instead of a rolling start, was used in JAF GP races.
- Titles were awarded separately to Formula Nippon, GT500, and GT300 participants, depending on their overall results in their respective races.

In 2014, the non-championship Fuji Sprint Cup was discontinued. The JAF Grand Prix title now applies to the season-ending round of the Super Formula Championship held at Suzuka.

== Winners of the JAF Grand Prix ==
=== Fuji Sprint Cup (2010–2013) ===
Year	Category	Driver	Vehicle
2013	Super Formula	(Japan) Yuji Kunimoto	SF13-Toyota RV8K
2013	GT500	(Japan) Toshihiro Kaneishi (Japan) Koudai Tsukakoshi	Honda HSV-010 GT
2013	GT300	(Japan) Katsuyuki Hiranaka (Sweden) Björn Wirdheim	Mercedes-Benz SLS AMG GT3
2012	Formula Nippon	(Japan) Takuya Izawa	FN09-Honda HR12E
2012	GT500	(Japan) Yuji Tachikawa (Japan) Kohei Hirate	Lexus SC430
2012	GT300	(Japan) Masami Kageyama (Japan) Tomonobu Fujii	Porsche 911 GT3-R
2011	Formula Nippon	(Brazil) João Paulo de Oliveira	FN09-Toyota RV8K
2011	GT500	(Japan) Masataka Yanagida (Italy) Ronnie Quintarelli	Nissan GT-R
2011	GT300	(Japan) Nobuteru Taniguchi (Japan) Taku Bamba	BMW Z4 GT3
2010	Formula Nippon	(Germany) André Lotterer	FN09-Toyota RV8K
2010	GT500	(Japan) Daisuke Ito (Sweden) Björn Wirdheim	Lexus SC430
2010	GT300	(Japan) Katsuyuki Hiranaka (Japan) Tetsuya Tanaka	Ferrari F430 GT2

=== Group C events (1988–1990) ===
Year	Driver	Constructor	Class	Location
1990	(Japan) Masanori Sekiya (Japan) Hitoshi Ogawa	Toyota	Group C	Fuji
1989	(Australia) Vern Schuppan (Sweden) Eje Elgh (Japan) Keiji Matsumoto	Porsche	Group C	Fuji
1988	(Japan) Hideki Okada (Sweden) Stanley Dickens	Porsche	Group C	Fuji

=== Formula events (1969–1990, 2014–2016) ===
Year	Driver	Constructor	Class	Location
2016	(Japan) Yuji Kunimoto	Dallara-Toyota	Super Formula	Suzuka
2015	(Japan) Naoki Yamamoto	Dallara-Honda	Super Formula	Suzuka
2014	(Japan) Kazuki Nakajima	Dallara-Toyota	Super Formula	Suzuka
1986	(Japan) Kazuyoshi Hoshino	March-Honda	Formula Two	Suzuka
1985	(Japan) Satoru Nakajima	March-Honda	Formula Two	Suzuka
1984	(Japan) Satoru Nakajima	March-Honda	Formula Two	Suzuka
1983	(United Kingdom) Geoff Lees	March-Honda	Formula Two	Suzuka
1982^{1}	(Japan) Satoru Nakajima	March-Honda	Formula Two^{1}	Suzuka
1982^{1}	(Japan) Kazuyoshi Hoshino	Ralt-Nissan	Formula Pacific^{1}	Suzuka
1981^{1}	(Japan) Satoru Nakajima	March-Honda	Formula Two^{1}	Suzuka
1981^{1}	(Japan) Masahiro Hasemi	March-Nissan	Formula Pacific^{1}	Suzuka
1980^{1}	(Japan) Kazuyoshi Hoshino	March-BMW	Formula Two^{1}	Suzuka
1980^{1}	(Japan) Masahiro Hasemi	March-Nissan	Formula Pacific^{1}	Suzuka
1979^{1,}^{2}	(Japan) Kazuyoshi Hoshino	March-BMW	Formula Two^{1}	Suzuka^{2}
1979^{1,}^{2}	(Japan) Kenji Takahashi	Nova-Nissan	Formula Pacific^{1}	Suzuka^{2}
1979^{1,}^{2}	(Japan) Keiji Matsumoto	March-BMW	Formula Two^{1}	Fuji^{2}
1979^{1,}^{2}	(Japan) Takao Wada	March-Nissan	Formula Pacific^{1}	Fuji^{2}
1978^{2}	(Japan) Kunimitsu Takahashi	Kojima-BMW	Formula Two	Suzuka^{2}
1978^{2}	(Japan) Kenji Takahashi	Nova-BMW	Formula Two	Fuji^{2}
1977	(Italy) Riccardo Patrese	Chevron-BMW	Formula 2000	Suzuka
1977	(Japan) Kazuyoshi Hoshino	Nova-BMW	Formula 2000	Fuji
1976	(Japan) Noritake Takahara	Nova-BMW	Formula 2000	Fuji
1975	(Japan) Kazuyoshi Hoshino	March-BMW	Formula 2000	Suzuka
1974	(Japan) Noritake Takahara	March-BMW	Formula 2000	Suzuka
1973 – 1971	Not held			
1970	(United Kingdom) Jackie Stewart	Brabham-Ford	Formula Libre	Fuji
1969	(Australia) Leo Geoghegan	Lotus-Repco	Formula Libre	Fuji

Notes:

1. – The Grand Prix had been awarded for winners of two classes (Formula Two and Formula Pacific) per event from 1979 to 1982.
2. – Two events each were held in years 1978 and 1979.
