= Kazuyoshi Hoshino =

Japanese racing driver (born 1947)

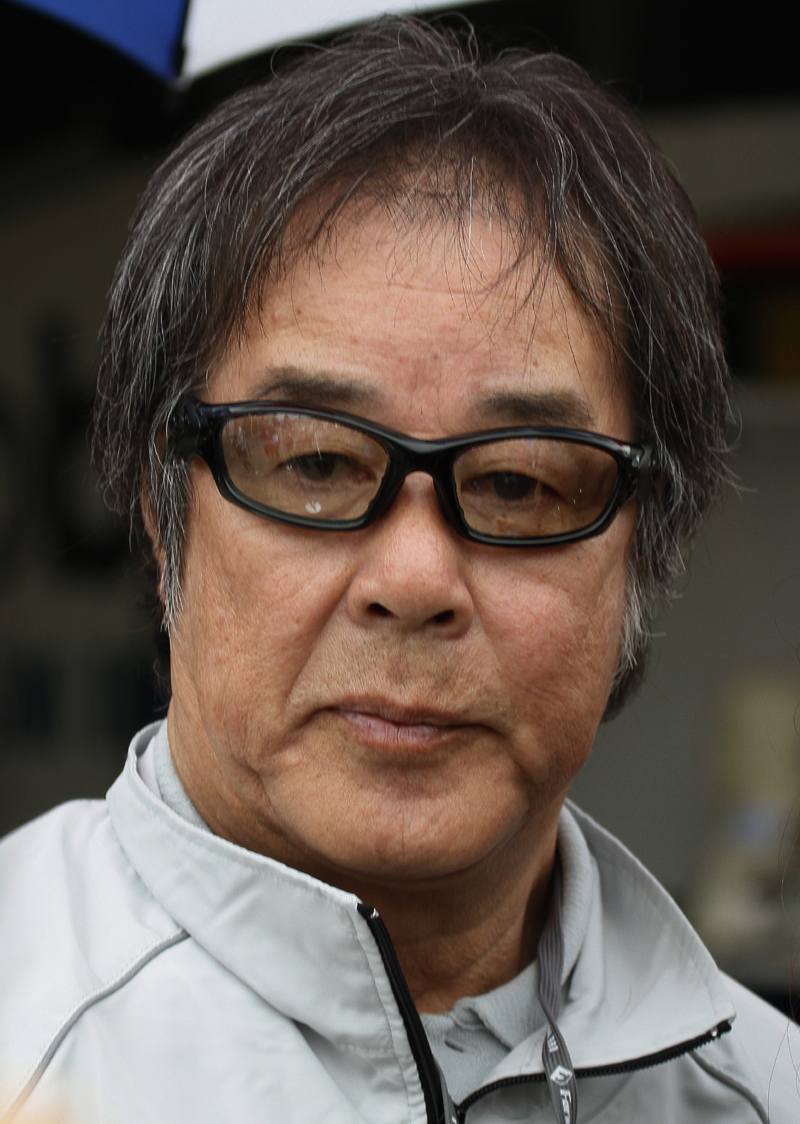
- Hoshino in 2010 as team principal of Impul.
- Born: 1 July 1947 (age 79); Shizuoka, Shizuoka Prefecture, Japan
- Relatives: Kazuki Hoshino (son)

Formula One World Championship career
- Nationality: (Japan) Japanese
- Active years: 1976 – 1977
- Team: Heros Racing
- Entries: 2
- Championships: 0
- Wins: 0
- Podiums: 0
- Career points: 0
- Pole positions: 0
- Fastest laps: 0
- First entry: 1976 Japanese Grand Prix
- Last entry: 1977 Japanese Grand Prix

24 Hours of Le Mans career
- Years: 1986–1990, 1995–1998
- Teams: Nismo, TOM'S
- Best finish: 3rd (1998)

Kazuyoshi Hoshino (Shinjitai: 星野 一義, Hoshino Kazuyoshi; born 1 July 1947) is a Japanese former racing driver and businessman.

== Motorsport career ==
Hoshino's nickname was "the fastest man/guy in Japan" (日本一速い男, Nippon ichi hayai otoko). He won the Japanese motocross national championships in the 90cc and 125cc classes for Kawasaki in 1968 before switching to cars as a Nissan factory driver in 1969. He began open-wheel racing in FJ1300 in 1974 and quickly moved upward into the higher tiers.

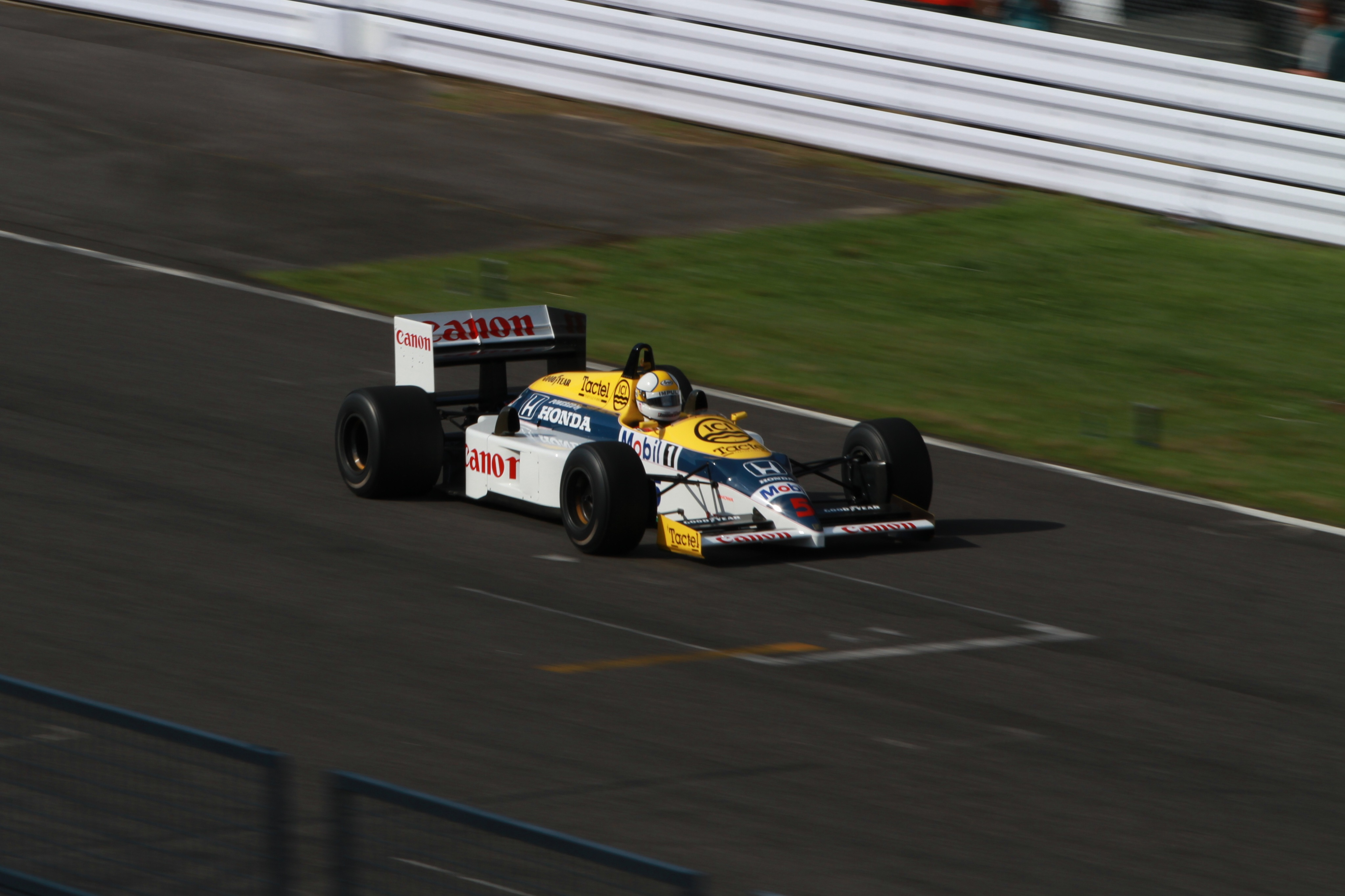
Hoshino sampling a Williams FW11 in 2012.

Hoshino participated in two Formula One Grands Prix, debuting on 24 October 1976 at the Japanese Grand Prix, making him – along with compatriots Noritake Takahara and Masahiro Hasemi – the first Japanese driver to start a Formula One Grand Prix. Driving a Tyrrell-Ford for Heros Racing, he ran as high as fourth, but retired having used up his tyre supply. He returned in 1977 and once again entered the Japanese Grand Prix driving for Heros Racing. He finished in eleventh place driving a year-old Kojima-Ford. He scored no championship points in his Formula 1 career.

Hoshino's only major world championship win was in the 1985 World Sportscar Championship round at the Fuji 1000 race, which was boycotted by many competing teams due to torrential rain.

Hoshino won the Japanese Formula 2000 championship in 1975 and 1977 (taking pole position in every race he entered in 1977), before winning the Japanese Formula Two championship in 1978. He then competed in the Japanese Formula 3000 championship, winning that title in 1987, 1990 and 1993. His six championships and 39 race wins still stand as series records.

Hoshino also dominated the Fuji Grand Champion Series in the 1970s and 1980s. He won five titles in 1978, 1982, 1984, 1985 and 1987, collecting 28 wins and 42 podiums.

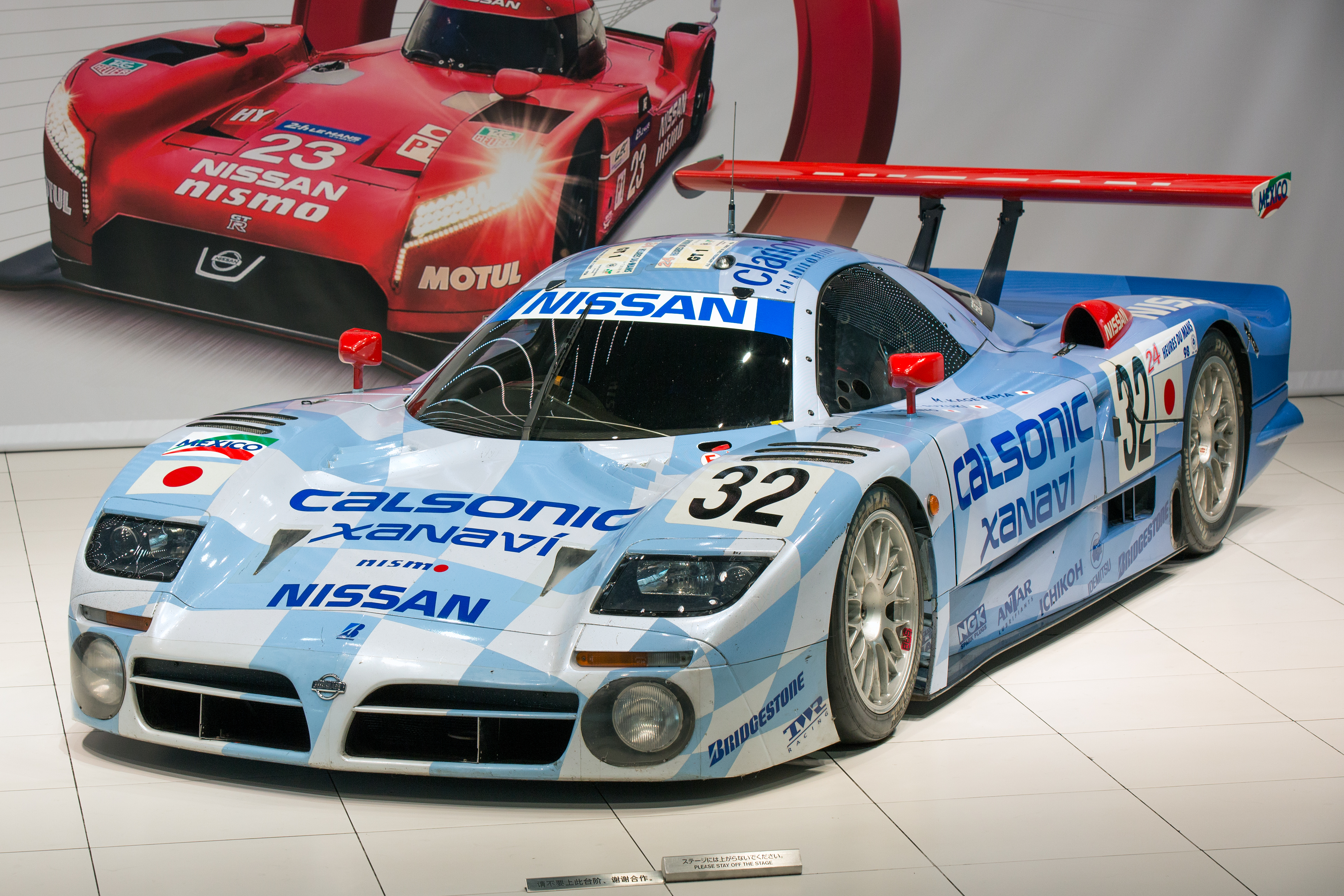
Hoshino's 1998 Le Mans podium-finishing Nissan (pictured in 2015).

Like his compatriot, Masahiro Hasemi, Hoshino continued his career racing for Nissan, driving a Skyline GT-R to win the Japanese Touring Car Championship in 1990. Hoshino drove a Nissan R90C with Toshio Suzuki to win the 1990 Suzuka 1000 race. Hoshino and Suzuki also won the All Japan Sports Prototype Championship in 1991 and 1992. Along with Nissan Motorsports teammates Aguri Suzuki and Masahiko Kageyama, Hoshino drove a Nissan R390 GT1 to a third-place finish at the 1998 24 Hours of Le Mans.

Hoshino retired from racing in 2002 and now continues to run his own Super GT team and his own Nissan specialised aftermarket parts company, Impul. Since 2003, his racing team has won the Formula Nippon championship seven times in eight years. His son, Kazuki Hoshino, also became a racing driver before succeeding his father as Impul's team director in both Super GT and Super Formula in 2023.

== Racing record ==
=== All Japan FJ1300 Championship results ===
(key) (Races in bold indicate pole position)

Year	Entrant	Chassis	Engine	1	2	3	4	5	6	7	8	9	DC	Points
1974	Tomei Automobile	March 733	Nissan	**SUZ**; 1	FUJ	SUZ	SUZ	SUZ	SUZ; Ret	SUZ	SUZ; Ret		7th	20
1975	Tomei Automobile	March 733	Nissan	SUZ; 3	SUZ	**TSU**; Ret	SUZ	FUJ; Ret	FUJ; 1	**MIN**; 1	**SUZ**; Ret	**SUZ**; 2	3rd	67
1976	Tomei Automobile	March 733	Nissan	**SUZ**; 1	FUJ; 3	SUZ	SUZ; 2	**SUZ**; 1					1st	67

=== Complete All Japan F2000/All Japan F2/All Japan F3000/Formula Nippon results ===
(key) (Races in bold indicate pole position) (Races in italics indicate fastest lap)

Year	Entrant	Chassis	Engine	Tyre	1	2	3	4	5	6	7	8	9	10	11	DC	Points
1974	Kojima Engineering	Surtees TS15	Ford BDA	B	SUZ	SUZ	SUZ	SUZ; 3								5th	10
1975	Victory Circle Club	March 742	BMW M12	B	FUJ	**SUZ**; 2	**FUJ**; 1	**SUZ**; 3	**SUZ**; 1							**1st**	**59**
1976	Heros Racing Corporation	March 742/Nova 512B	BMW M12	B	**FUJ**; Ret	SUZ	**FUJ**; 1	SUZ; 1	SUZ; DNS							4th	40
1977	Heros Racing Corporation	Nova 512B/Nova 532P	BMW M12	B	**SUZ**; 3	**SUZ**; 1	MIN	**SUZ**; 2	**FUJ**; 1	**FUJ**; 1	**SUZ**; Ret	**SUZ**; 2				**1st**	**90 (102)**
1978	Heros Racing Corporation	Nova 532	BMW M12	B	**SUZ**; 1	**FUJ**; 1	SUZ; 3	**SUZ**; Ret	**SUZ**; 1	MIN	SUZ; 12					**1st**	**76**
1979	Heros Racing Corporation	March 792/Nova 532Kai	BMW M12	B	SUZ; 2	MIN	SUZ; 2	FUJ; 10	**SUZ**; 2	**SUZ**; 6	SUZ; 1					**2nd**	**78 (79)**
1980	Heros Racing Corporation	March 802	BMW M12	B	**SUZ**; 3	MIN; 2	**SUZ**; 4	**SUZ**; Ret	SUZ; 2	SUZ; 1						**2nd**	**65**
1981	Heros Racing Corporation	Lola T850	BMW M12	B	SUZ; 2	**SUZ**; 10	**SUZ**; 1	SUZ; 3	SUZ; Ret							**2nd**	**48**
1982	Heros Racing Corporation	Lola T850/March 822	BMW M12	B	SUZ; 3	**FUJ**; Ret	SUZ; Ret	**SUZ**; 1	SUZ; 5	SUZ; 2						**2nd**	**55**
1983	Hoshino Racing	March 832	BMW M12	B	SUZ; 4	**FUJ**; DSQ	**MIN**; 3	SUZ; 2	**SUZ**; 2	FUJ; 3	**SUZ**; 2	SUZ; 3				**2nd**	**79 (89)**
1984	Hoshino Racing	March 842	BMW M12	B	SUZ; 2	FUJ; 2	MIN; 1	SUZ; 2	SUZ; 2	FUJ; 5	SUZ; 2	SUZ; Ret				**3rd**	**95 (103)**
1985	Hoshino Racing	March 85J	Honda	B	SUZ; 10	**FUJ**; 2	MIN; 2	SUZ; DNS	SUZ; 1	**FUJ**; 11	SUZ; 14	SUZ; DNS				4th	51
1986	Hoshino Racing	March 86J	Honda	B	SUZ; Ret	FUJ; 3	MIN; Ret	SUZ; 2	SUZ; 1	FUJ; Ret	SUZ; 1	SUZ; 1				**2nd**	**87**
1987	Hoshino Racing	March 87B/Lola T87-50	Honda RA387E	B	SUZ; 1	**FUJ**; 10	MIN; 2	SUZ; 1	SUZ; 1	SUG; 1	FUJ; 6	SUZ; 2	SUZ; 2			**1st**	**132**
1988	Cabin Racing Team with Impul	Lola T88/50	Mugen MF308	B	**SUZ**; 1	FUJ; 2	MIN; 3	SUZ; 2	SUG; 3	FUJ; Ret	**SUZ**; 1	SUZ; 1				**2nd**	**43**
1989	Cabin Racing Team with Impul	Lola T88/50/Lola T89-50	Mugen MF308	B	**SUZ**; 1	FUJ; Ret	MIN; Ret	**SUZ**; Ret	SUG; Ret	FUJ; 1	SUZ; 3	SUZ; Ret				**3rd**	**22**
1990	Cabin Racing Team with Impul	Lola T90/50	Mugen MF308	B	**SUZ**; 1	**FUJ**; 1	MIN; 4	SUZ; 16	SUG; 3	FUJ; 1	FUJ; 1	SUZ; 1	FUJ; 5	SUZ; 1		**1st**	**58 (63)**
1991	Cabin Racing Team with Impul	Lola T90/50/Lola T91/50	Mugen MF308	B	SUZ; Ret	AUT; 2	FUJ; 1	MIN; Ret	SUZ; Ret	SUG; Ret	FUJ; 1	SUZ; Ret	FUJ; C	SUZ; Ret	**FUJ**; Ret	4th	24
1992	Cabin Racing Team with Impul	Lola T91/50/Lola T92/50/Reynard 92D	Mugen MF308/Cosworth DFV	B	SUZ; 2	FUJ; Ret	MIN; DNS	SUZ; Ret	AUT; Ret	SUG; 7	FUJ; 3	FUJ; Ret	SUZ; Ret	FUJ; 12	SUZ; 13	12th	10
1993	Nisseki Impul Racing Team	Lola T92/50	Cosworth DFV	B	SUZ; 2	FUJ; 1	MIN; Ret	SUZ; 2	AUT; C	SUG; Ret	FUJ; C	FUJ; Ret	SUZ; 5	FUJ; 1	SUZ; Ret	**1st**	**32**
1994	Nisseki Impul Racing Team	Lola T92/50/Lola T93-50	Mugen MF308	B	SUZ; Ret	FUJ; 7	MIN; Ret	SUZ; Ret	SUG; Ret	FUJ; 5	SUZ; 15	FUJ; Ret	FUJ; 4	SUZ; 6		8th	6
1995	Nisseki Impul Racing Team	Lola T93/50/Lola T94-50	Mugen MF308	B	SUZ; 11	FUJ; C	MIN; 3	SUZ; 6	SUG; Ret	FUJ; 2	TOK; Ret	FUJ; 2	SUZ; 4			4th	20
1996	Calsonic RACING TEAM with IMPUL	Lola T96/52	Mugen MF308	B	SUZ; 1	MIN; Ret	FUJ; 3	TOK; 4	SUZ; 5	SUG; 2	FUJ; Ret	MIN; Ret	SUZ; 2	**FUJ**; Ret		**3rd**	**31**

=== Complete Fuji Grand Championship results ===
Year	Entrant	Chassis	Engine	1	2	3	4	5	6	DC	Points
1972	Nissan Sports Car Club	Nissan Fairlady 240ZG	Nissan	FUJ 1 4	FUJ 2	FUJ 3 Ret	FUJ 4			9th	15
1973	Nissan Sports Car Club	Nissan Fairlady 240ZG	Nissan	FUJ 1 5	FUJ 2	FUJ 3	FUJ 4	FUJ 5		15th	8
1974	Sakai Racing Team	March 73S	BMW M12	FUJ 1	FUJ 2	FUJ 3	FUJ 4 Ret	FUJ 5	FUJ 6	NC	0
1975	?	March 74S	BMW M12	FUJ 1	FUJ 2	FUJ 3	FUJ 4 2	FUJ 5 Ret		8th	16
1976	Heroes Racing Corporation	March 74S	BMW M12	FUJ 1 14	FUJ 2	FUJ 3 6	FUJ 4 12	FUJ 5 1		6th	28
1977	Heroes Racing Corporation	March 74S	BMW M12	FUJ 1 1	FUJ 2 8	FUJ 3 Ret	FUJ 4 1	FUJ 5 1		2nd	63
1978	Heroes Racing Corporation	March 74S/Nova 53S	BMW M12	FUJ 1 1	FUJ 2 1	FUJ 3 Ret	FUJ 4 1	FUJ 5 16		1st	27
1979	Heroes Racing Corporation	Nova 53S/Nova 54S	BMW M12	FUJ 1 4	FUJ 2 1	FUJ 3 Ret	FUJ 4 Ret			5th	30
1980	Heroes Racing Corporation	MCS(Nova)	BMW M12	FUJ 1 Ret	FUJ 2 1	FUJ 3 7	FUJ 4 6			5th	30
1981	Heroes Racing Corporation	MCS (Nova)/MCS II(March 792)	BMW M12	FUJ 1 6	FUJ 2 3	FUJ 3 2	FUJ 4 12			4th	33
1982	Heroes Racing Corporation	MCS II(March 792)	BMW M12	FUJ 1 Ret	FUJ 2 2	FUJ 3 C	FUJ 4 2	FUJ 5 1		1st	50
1983	?	MCS IV(March 822)	BMW M12	FUJ 1 1	FUJ 2 Ret	FUJ 3 Ret	FUJ 4 1			2nd	40
1984	?	MCS V(March 832)	BMW M12	FUJ 1 1	FUJ 2 1	FUJ 3 1	FUJ 4 1			1st	80
1985	?	MCS VI(March 842)	BMW M12	FUJ 1 2	FUJ 2 1	FUJ 3 Ret	FUJ 4 1			1st	55
1986	?	MCS VII(March 85J)	BMW M12	FUJ 1 1	FUJ 2 Ret	FUJ 3 2	FUJ 4 14			4th	35
1987	?	MCS VIIKai(March 86B)	Ford	FUJ 1 1	FUJ 2 2	FUJ 3 1	FUJ 4 1			1st	75
1988	?	MCS VIII(March 88GC/Lola T88/50)	Mugen	FUJ 1 16	SUG 1 4	FUJ 2 3	FUJ 3 1	SUZ 1 5	FUJ 4 1	3rd	60
1989	?	Cerumo 89G/MCS VIII(Lola T88/50)	Mugen	FUJ 1 2	SUG 1 4	FUJ 2 4	FUJ 3 Ret	SUZ 1 2	FUJ 4 3	5th	22

=== Complete Formula One results ===
(key)

Year	Entrant	Chassis	Engine	1	2	3	4	5	6	7	8	9	10	11	12	13	14	15	16	17	WDC	Points
1976	Heros Racing	Tyrrell 007	Cosworth V8	BRA	RSA	USW	ESP	BEL	MON	SWE	FRA	GBR	GER	AUT	NED	ITA	CAN	USA	JPN; Ret		NC	0
1977	Heros Racing	Kojima KE009	Cosworth V8	ARG	BRA	RSA	USW	ESP	MON	BEL	SWE	FRA	GBR	GER	AUT	NED	ITA	USA	CAN	JPN; 11	NC	0

=== Complete European Formula Two Championship results ===
(key) (Races in bold indicate pole position; races in italics indicate fastest lap)

Year	Entrant	Chassis	Engine	1	2	3	4	5	6	7	8	9	10	11	12	Pos.	Pts
1978	Heros Racing	Nova 532	BMW	THR	HOC	NÜR	PAU	MUG	VAL	ROU; Ret	DON; Ret	NOG	PER	MIS	HOC	NC	0
1983	James Gresham Racing	March 832	BMW	SIL	THR	HOC	NÜR	VAL	PAU	JAR	DON; 4	MIS	PER	ZOL	MUG	16th	3

=== Complete JTC/JTCC results ===
(key) (Races in bold indicate pole position) (Races in italics indicate fastest lap)

Year	Team	Car	Class	1	2	3	4	5	6	7	8	9	10	11	12	13	14	15	16	17	18	DC	Pts
1989	Impul	Nissan Skyline GTS-R	JTC-1	NIS; Ret	SEN; 1	TSU; 4	SUG; Ret	SUZ; 6	FUJ; Ret													?	?
1990	Impul	Nissan Skyline GT-R	JTC-1	NIS; 1	SUG; 1	SUZ; 2	TSU; 1	SEN; 1	FUJ; 1													1st	230
1991	Impul	Nissan Skyline GT-R	JTC-1	SUG; 1	SUZ; Ret	TSU; 3	SEN; 1	AUT; 2	FUJ; 1													3rd	174
1992	Impul	Nissan Skyline GT-R	JTC-1	AID; Ret	AUT; 3	SUG; 1	SUZ; Ret	MIN; Ret	TSU; 1	SEN; 1	FUJ; 6											7th	78
1993	Impul	Nissan Skyline GT-R	JTC-1	MIN; 1	AUT; 3	SUG	SUZ; 3	AID; 1	TSU; 2	TOK; 1	SEN; 1	FUJ; Ret										2nd	119
1994	Nismo	Nissan Primera		AUT; 1; 3	AUT; 2 Ret	SUG; 1 Ret	SUG; 2; 3	TOK; 1; 7	TOK; 2 Ret	SUZ; 1; 3	SUZ; 2; 20	MIN; 1; 16	MIN; 2 Ret	AID; 1; 4	AID; 2 Ret	TSU; 1 Ret	TSU; 2 DNS	SEN; 1	SEN; 2	**FUJ**; **1**; 1	**FUJ**; **2** Ret	8th	53
1995	Hoshino Racing	Nissan Primera		FUJ; 1; 6	FUJ; 2; 6	SUG; 1; 24	SUG; 2; 6	TOK; 1 Ret	TOK; 2 Ret	SUZ; 1; 3	SUZ; 2; 2	MIN; 1; 14	MIN; 2 Ret	AID; 1; 2	AID; 2; 2	SEN; 1; 6	SEN; 2; 5	FUJ; 1; 2	FUJ; 2; 1			**3rd**	**98**
1996	Team Impul	Nissan Primera		FUJ; 1 Ret	FUJ; 2 Ret	SUG; 1; 5	SUG; 2; 16	SUZ; 1; 9	SUZ; 2; 17	MIN; 1; 1	MIN; 2; 2	SEN; 1 Ret	SEN; 2; 4	TOK; 1; 10	TOK; 2 Ret	**FUJ**; **1**; 5	FUJ; 2; 2					6th	61
1997	Nismo	Nissan Primera		FUJ; 1 C	FUJ; 2 C	AID; 1; 6	AID; 2; 14	SUG; 1; 2	SUG; 2; 1	SUZ; 1; 2	SUZ; 2; 6	MIN; 1; 4	MIN; 2; 11	SEN; 1; 2	SEN; 2 Ret	TOK; 1; 3	TOK; 2 Ret	FUJ; 1; 8	FUJ; 2; 1			4th	95

=== Complete JGTC results ===
(key)

Year	Team	Car	Class	1	2	3	4	5	6	7	8	DC	Pts
1995	Hoshino Racing	Nissan Skyline GT-R	GT1	SUZ	FUJ	SEN; 2	FUJ; 7	SUG; 2	MIN; 3			14th	19
1996	Impul	Nissan Skyline GT-R	GT500	SUZ; 8	FUJ; 5	SEN; 5	MIN; 1	SUG; 2	MIN; Ret			4th	54
1997	Impul	Nissan Skyline GT-R	GT500	SUZ; Ret	FUJ	SEN; 15	FUJ; 4	MIN; 6	SUG; 14			13th	16
1998	Impul	Nissan Skyline GT-R	GT500	SUZ; 11	FUJ	SEN; 5	FUJ; 3	MOT; 2	MIN; 7	SUG; 4		**3rd**	**49**
1999	Impul	Nissan Skyline GT-R	GT500	SUZ; 10	FUJ; 3	SUG; 5	MIN; 6	FUJ; 5	TAI; 10	MOT; 7		7th	40
2000	Impul	Nissan Skyline GT-R	GT500	MOT; 17	FUJ; 5	SUG; 5	FUJ; 3	TAI; 6	MIN; 1	SUZ; 3		**3rd**	**66**
2001	Impul	Nissan Skyline GT-R	GT500	TAI	FUJ	SUG	FUJ; 7	MOT; 3	SUZ; 11	MIN; 5		13th	24
2002	Impul	Nissan Skyline GT-R	GT500	TAI; 14	FUJ; Ret	SUG; 8	SEP; 14	FUJ; Ret	MOT	MIN	SUZ	24th	3

=== Complete 24 Hours of Le Mans results ===
Year	Team	Co-Drivers	Car	Class	Laps	Pos.	Class Pos.
1986	(Japan) Nissan Motorsport	(Japan) Keiji Matsumoto (Japan) Aguri Suzuki	Nissan R86V	C1	64	DNF	DNF
1987	(Japan) Nissan Motorsport	(Japan) Kenji Takahashi (Japan) Keiji Matsumoto	Nissan R87E	C1	181	DNF	DNF
1988	(Japan) Nissan Motorsport	(Japan) Takao Wada (Japan) Aguri Suzuki	Nissan R88C	C1	296	DNF	DNF
1989	(Japan) Nissan Motorsport	(Japan) Masahiro Hasemi (Japan) Toshio Suzuki	Nissan R89C	C1	167	DNF	DNF
1990	(Japan) Nissan Motorsport	(Japan) Masahiro Hasemi (Japan) Toshio Suzuki	Nissan R90C	C1	348	5th	5th
1995	(Japan) Nissan Motorsport	(Japan) Masahiko Kageyama (Japan) Toshio Suzuki	Nissan Skyline GT-R LM	GT1	157	DNF	DNF
1996	(Japan) Nissan Motorsport	(Japan) Masahiro Hasemi (Japan) Toshio Suzuki	Nissan Skyline GT-R LM	GT1	307	15th	10th
1997	(Japan) Nissan Motorsport (United Kingdom) TWR	(France) Érik Comas (Japan) Masahiko Kageyama	Nissan R390 GT1	GT1	294	12th	5th
1998	(Japan) Nissan Motorsport (United Kingdom) TWR	(Japan) Aguri Suzuki (Japan) Masahiko Kageyama	Nissan R390 GT1	GT1	347	**3rd**	**3rd**

=== Complete Bathurst 1000 results ===
Year	Team	Co-Drivers	Car	Class	Laps	Pos.	Class Pos.
1981	(Australia) Nissan Motor Co.	(Japan) Masahiro Hasemi	Nissan Bluebird (910) Turbo	4 Cylinder	66	DNF	DNF
1982	(Australia) Nissan Motor Co.	(Japan) Masahiro Hasemi	Nissan Bluebird (910) Turbo	B	153	8th	1st

Sporting positions
Preceded by Taichi Yoshimura	All Japan 125cc Motocross; Champion; 1968	Succeeded by Kinjiro Yajima
Preceded by Noritake Takahara	Japanese Formula 2000; Champion; 1975	Succeeded by Noritake Takahara
Preceded by Noritake Takahara	Japanese Formula 2000 / Japanese Formula Two; Champion; 1977-1978	Succeeded by Keiji Matsumoto
Preceded by Satoru Nakajima (Japanese Formula Two)	Japanese Formula 3000; Champion; 1987	Succeeded by Aguri Suzuki
Preceded by Hitoshi Ogawa	Japanese Formula 3000; Champion; 1990	Succeeded by Ukyo Katayama
Preceded by Masahiro Hasemi	Japanese Touring Car Championship; Champion; 1990	Succeeded by Masahiro Hasemi
Preceded by Mauro Martini	Japanese Formula 3000; Champion; 1993	Succeeded by Marco Apicella
