= 1987 Japanese Formula 3000 Championship =

Seasons
- ← 1986 1988 →

The 1987 Japanese Formula 3000 Championship was contested over 9 rounds. 17 different teams, 22 different drivers, 2 different chassis and 3 different engines competed.

== Calendar ==
Race No	Track	Country	Date	Laps	Distance	Time	Speed	Winner	Pole position	Fastest race lap
1	Suzuka	Japan	8 March 1987	23	5.912=135.976 km	0'44:46.408	182.219 km/h	Kazuyoshi Hoshino	Geoff Lees	Kazuyoshi Hoshino
2	Fuji	Japan	19 April 1987	35	4.441=155.435 km	0'46:39.142	199.906 km/h	Geoff Lees	Kazuyoshi Hoshino	?
3	Nishinihon	Japan	10 May 1987	37	2.816=104.192 km	0'39:14.531	159.306 km/h	Toshio Suzuki	Geoff Lees	?
4	Suzuka	Japan	24 May 1987	30	5.912=177.360 km	0'58:16.719	182.599 km/h	Kazuyoshi Hoshino	Geoff Lees	Kazuyoshi Hoshino
5	Suzuka	Japan	5 July 1987	30	5.912=177.360 km	0'58:46.404	1181.062 km/h	Kazuyoshi Hoshino	Geoff Lees	Kazuyoshi Hoshino
6	Sugo	Japan	26 July 1987	41	3.704=151.864 km	0'52:13.41	174.478 km/h	Kazuyoshi Hoshino	Geoff Lees	?
7	Fuji	Japan	9 August 1987	23	4.441=102.143 km	0'30:00.724	204.204 km/h	Jan Lammers	Geoff Lees	?
8	Suzuka	Japan	13 September 1987	30	5.859=175.770 km	0'58:37.715	179.882 km/h	Aguri Suzuki	Geoff Lees	Kazuyoshi Hoshino
9	Suzuka	Japan	6 December 1987	30	5.859=175.770 km	0'56:52.557	185.425 km/h	Aguri Suzuki	Aguri Suzuki	Kazuyoshi Hoshino

== Final point standings ==
=== Driver ===
For every race points were awarded: 20 points to the winner, 15 for runner-up, 12 for third place, 10 for fourth place, 8 for fifth place, 6 for sixth place, 4 for seventh place, 3 for eighth place, 2 for ninth place and 1 for tenth place. No additional points were awarded. All results count.

Place	Name	Country	Team	Chassis	Engine	(Japan)	(Japan)	(Japan)	(Japan)	(Japan)	(Japan)	(Japan)	(Japan)	(Japan)	Total points
1	Kazuyoshi Hoshino	Japan	Hoshino Racing	March	Honda	20									132
1	Kazuyoshi Hoshino	Japan	Hoshino Racing	Lola	Honda		1	15	20	20	20	6	15	15	132
2	Aguri Suzuki	Japan	Footwork Racing International	March	Cosworth	15	15	10	12	15					107
2	Aguri Suzuki	Japan	Footwork Racing International	March	Cosworth-Yamaha						-	-	20	20	107
3	Geoff Lees	United Kingdom	Team Nova	Lola	Honda	1	20	8	15	12	15	-	12	-	83
4	Keiji Matsumoto	Japan	Cabin Racing	March	Cosworth	-	12								78
4	Keiji Matsumoto	Japan	Cabin Racing	Lola	Cosworth			12	10	10	12	-	10	12	78
5	Toshio Suzuki	Japan	Heros Racing Corporation	March	Honda	12	-	20	8	6	3	15	-	8	72
6	Osamu Nakako	Japan	Best House Racing Team	March	Cosworth	4	8	4	-	1	8	8	2	4	39
7	Masahiro Hasemi	Japan	Speed Star Wheel Racing Team	Lola	Cosworth	-	10	6	-	-	10	12	-	-	38
8	Jan Lammers	Netherlands	Dome	March	Cosworth	10	-	-	-	4	-				34
8	Jan Lammers	Netherlands	Dome	March	Cosworth-Yamaha							20	-	-	34
9	Kunimitsu Takahashi	Japan	Team Nova	March	Honda	6	4	3	6	2	6	3	3	-	33
10	Masanori Sekiya	Japan	Leyton House Racing	Lola	Cosworth	-	6	-	-	8	-	-	8	10	32
11	Eje Elgh	Sweden	Team Kitamura	March	Cosworth	-	-	2	3	3	-	10	6	-	24
12	Takao Wada	Japan	Shigeyama Racing	March	Cosworth	-	3	1	4						14
12	Takao Wada	Japan	Shigeyama Racing	Lola	Cosworth					-	4	2	-	-	14
	Yoshiyasu Tachi	Japan	Speed Star Wheel Racing Team	Lola	Cosworth	-	-	-	2	-	2	-	4	6	14
14	Hideshi Matsuda	Japan	Takeshi Project Team	March	Cosworth	8	-	-	-	-	1	-	-	2	11
15	Kenny Acheson	United Kingdom	Tomei	March	Cosworth	3	-	-	1	-	-	4	-	-	8
16	Masatomo Shimizu	Japan	Shimizu Racing	Lola	Cosworth	2	-	-	-	-	-	1	1	3	7
17	Ross Cheever	United States	Dome	March	Cosworth	-	2	-	-	-	-	-	-	-	2
18	Taku Akaike	Japan	Sundai Spilit	March	Cosworth	-	-	-	-	-	-	-	-	1	1

== Complete Overview ==
first column of every race	10	= grid position

second column of every race	10	= race result

R=retired DIS=disqualified

Place	Name	Country	Team	Chassis	Engine	(Japan)		(Japan)		(Japan)		(Japan)		(Japan)		(Japan)		(Japan)		(Japan)		(Japan)
1	Kazuyoshi Hoshino	Japan	Hoshino Racing	March	Honda	2	1
1	Kazuyoshi Hoshino	Japan	Hoshino Racing	Lola	Honda			1	10	3	2	2	1	2	1	2	1	2	6	2	2	2	2
2	Aguri Suzuki	Japan	Footwork Racing International	March	Cosworth	3	2	3	2	2	4	7	3	3	2
2	Aguri Suzuki	Japan	Footwork Racing International	March	Cosworth-Yamaha											5	R	4	R	3	1	1	1
3	Geoff Lees	United Kingdom	Team Nova	Lola	Honda	1	10	2	1	1	5	1	2	1	3	1	2	1	12	1	3	5	R
4	Keiji Matsumoto	Japan	Cabin Racing	March	Cosworth	4	13	5	3
4	Keiji Matsumoto	Japan	Cabin Racing	Lola	Cosworth					5	3	5	4	6	4	6	3	3	R	6	4	3	3
5	Toshio Suzuki	Japan	Heros Racing Corporation	March	Honda	8	3	6	R	6	1	6	5	9	6	3	8	7	2	11	R	11	5
6	Osamu Nakako	Japan	Best House Racing Team	March	Cosworth	13	7	7	5	12	7	8	R	13	10	14	5	14	5	12	9	15	7
7	Masahiro Hasemi	Japan	Speed Star Wheel Racing Team	Lola	Cosworth	5	R	4	4	11	6	14	12	7	12	8	4	9	3	7	R	13	R
8	Jan Lammers	Netherlands	Dome	March	Cosworth	7	4	11	12	-	-	15	11	8	7	-	-
8	Jan Lammers	Netherlands	Dome	March	Cosworth-Yamaha													6	1	-	-	7	R
9	Kunimitsu Takahashi	Japan	Team Nova	March	Honda	17	6	15	7	7	8	10	6	5	9	9	6	10	8	9	8	8	R
10	Masanori Sekiya	Japan	Leyton House Racing	March	Cosworth	9	R
10	Masanori Sekiya	Japan	Leyton House Racing	Lola	Cosworth			8	6	4	R	-	-	4	5	7	R	5	R	4	5	4	4
11	Eje Elgh	Sweden	Team Kitamura	March	Cosworth	16	12	9	R	7	9	11	8	11	8	12	R	8	4	17	6	12	R
12	Takao Wada	Japan	Shigeyama Racing	March	Cosworth	6	14	13	8	9	10	3	7
12	Takao Wada	Japan	Shigeyama Racing	Lola	Cosworth									14	DIS	11	7	12	9	8	11	19	R
	Yoshiyasu Tachi	Japan	Speed Star Wheel Racing Team	March	Cosworth	10	R	12	R	13	11
	Yoshiyasu Tachi	Japan	Speed Star Wheel Racing Team	Lola	Cosworth							9	9	10	R	13	9	13	R	5	7	9	6
14	Hideshi Matsuda	Japan	Takeshi Project Team	March	Cosworth	11	5	-	-	14	12	12	R	17	16	15	10	17	14	14	R	14	9
15	Kenny Achson	United Kingdom	Tomei	March	Cosworth	12	8	14	16	-	-	4	10	12	15	10	R	11	7	10	R	10	R
16	Masatomo Shimizu	Japan	Shimizu Racing	Lola	Cosworth	14	9	16	11	16	13	13	13	16	R	17	11	15	10	13	10	16	8
17	Ross Cheever	United States	Dome	March	Cosworth	-	-	10	9	10	R	-	-	-	-
17	Ross Cheever	United States	Dome	March	Cosworth-Yamaha											4	R	-	-	15	13	-	-
18	Taku Akaike	Japan	Sundai Spilit	March	Cosworth	-	-	17	14	15	15	-	-	18	14	18	13	18	11	-	-	18	10
-	Mutsuaki Sanada	Japan	dp Motorsport	Lola	Cosworth	15	11	19	15	17	14	17	R	19	13	19	12	19	13	-	-	-	-
-	Tetsuya Ota	Japan	Checker Motor Sports Club	Lola	Cosworth	-	-	18	13	-	-	16	R	15	11	16	R	16	R	-	-	17	R
-	Kaoru Iida	Japan	Sundai Spilit Team	March	Cosworth	-	-	-	-	-	-	-	-	-	-	-	-	-	-	16	12	-	-
-	Akio Morimoto	Japan	Cabin Racing	March	Cosworth	-	-	-	-	-	-	-	-	-	-	-	-	20	R	-	-	6	R
