= 1976 Japanese Grand Prix =

Race 16 of 16 in the 1976 Formula One season
← Previous race

Race details
- Date: 24 October 1976
- Official name: XI Japanese Grand Prix
- Location: Fuji Speedway; Oyama, Shizuoka, Japan
- Course: Permanent racing facility
- Course length: 4.359 km (2.709 miles)
- Distance: 73 laps, 318.207 km (197.725 miles)
- Weather: Very wet and misty, eventually drying

Pole position
Driver	(United States) Mario Andretti	Lotus-Ford
- Time: 1:12.77

Fastest lap
Driver	(France) Jacques Laffite^{2}	Ligier-Matra
- Time: 1:19.97 on lap 70

Podium
First	(United States) Mario Andretti	Lotus-Ford
Second	(France) Patrick Depailler	Tyrrell-Ford
Third	(United Kingdom) James Hunt	McLaren-Ford

The 1976 Japanese Grand Prix^{1} was a Formula One motor race held at Fuji Speedway on 24 October 1976. It was the 16th and final race of the 1976 Formula One World Championship.

The 1976 World Championship was to be decided at the Mount Fuji circuit, with Niki Lauda just three points ahead of James Hunt after a season full of incidents including Lauda's near-fatal crash at the Nürburgring and subsequent missed races. Following Lauda's early retirement in the race, Hunt secured a third-place-finish and therefore enough points to overcome the three-point-deficit before the start of the final round, winning the championship by just one point over Lauda. It was the closest title-winning margin for eight years.

== Background ==
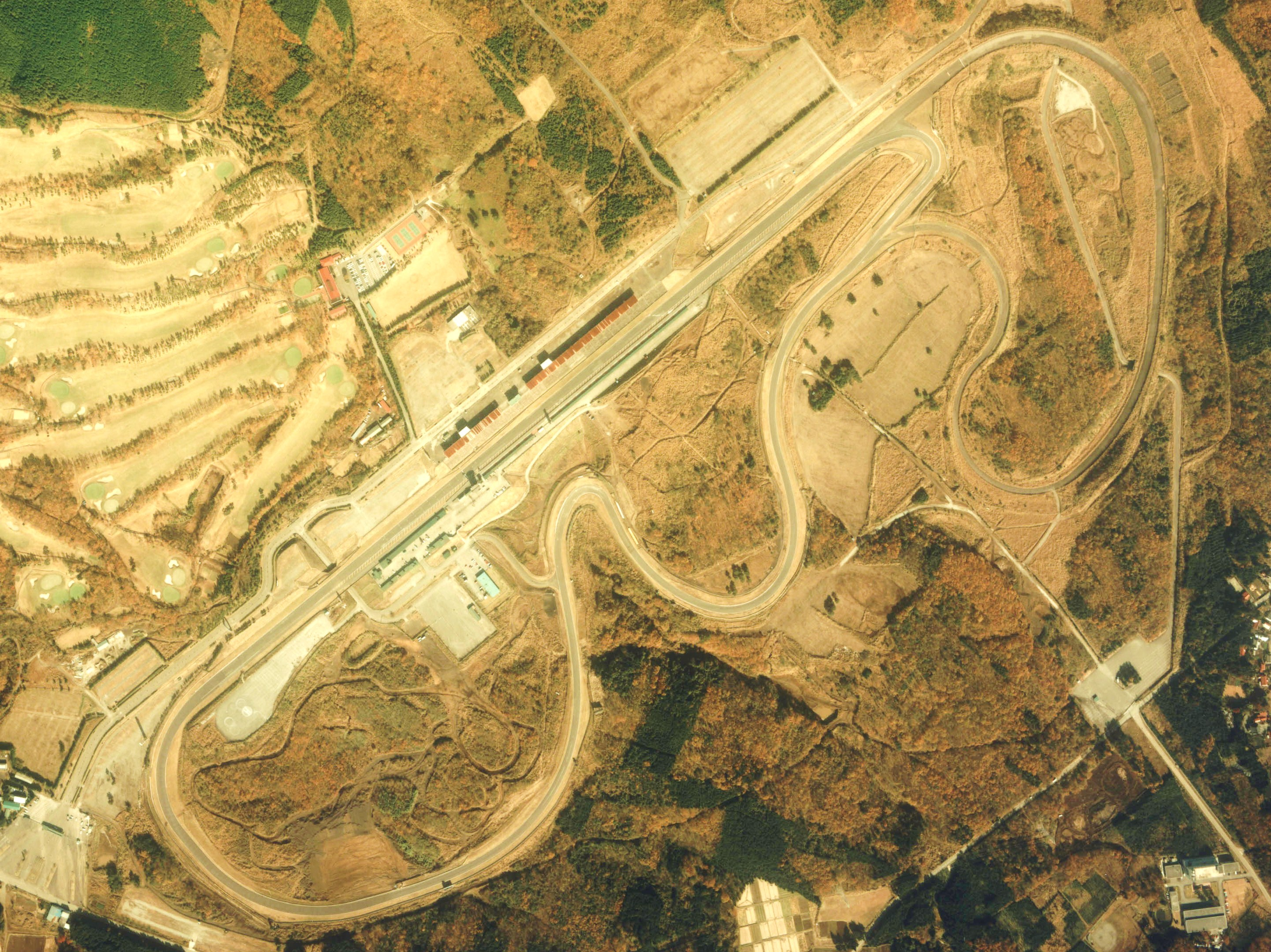
Fuji Speedway in 1983

=== Entries ===
The field was almost unchanged from the previous race, but Noritake Takahara rented the second Surtees replacing Brett Lunger and Masami Kuwashima replaced Warwick Brown in the second Wolf-Williams. However, Kuwashima was himself replaced by Hans Binder during the meeting, after his money failed to materialize. Maki resurrected its Formula One car for Tony Trimmer while Heros Racing entered an old Tyrrell for Kazuyoshi Hoshino on Bridgestone tyres, which was the first Formula One start for the Japanese manufacturer. Kojima Engineering entered a locally built chassis for Masahiro Hasemi (on Dunlop tyres).

=== Championship standings before the race ===
Heading into the final race of the season it was Niki Lauda who led the World Drivers' Championship by three points ahead of James Hunt. In the Constructors' Championship it was Ferrari who had an eleven point lead over McLaren. As this was the final race of the season with 9 points available for the win it meant that the Japanese Grand Prix would decide the Drivers' Championship although Ferrari had confirmed their Constructors' title win in the previous round.

==== Championship permutations ====
For Lauda to win the Championship he needed:

- to finish ahead of Hunt
- to finish 3rd with Hunt 2nd
- to finish 4th or 5th with Hunt 3rd
- to finish 6th with Hunt 4th or lower
- Hunt to finish 5th or lower

For Hunt to win the Championship he needed to finish:

- 1st
- 2nd with Lauda 4th or lower
- 3rd with Lauda 6th or lower
- 4th with Lauda 7th or lower

== Qualifying ==
Mario Andretti took pole position in the Lotus 77, with Hunt alongside him on the front row and Lauda third. Then came John Watson in the Penske, Jody Scheckter, Carlos Pace, Clay Regazzoni and Vittorio Brambilla. The top 10 was completed by Ronnie Peterson and Hasemi. Trimmer failed to qualify the Maki.

=== Qualifying classification ===
Pos	No	Driver	Constructor	Time	Gap
1	5	(United States) Mario Andretti	Lotus-Ford	1:12.77	—
2	11	(United Kingdom) James Hunt	McLaren-Ford	1:12.80	+0.03
3	1	(Austria) Niki Lauda	Ferrari	1:13.08	+0.31
4	28	(United Kingdom) John Watson	Penske-Ford	1:13.29	+0.52
5	3	(South Africa) Jody Scheckter	Tyrrell-Ford	1:13.31	+0.54
6	8	(Brazil) Carlos Pace	Brabham-Alfa Romeo	1:13.43	+0.66
7	2	(Switzerland) Clay Regazzoni	Ferrari	1:13.64	+0.87
8	9	(Italy) Vittorio Brambilla	March-Ford	1:13.72	+0.95
9	10	(Sweden) Ronnie Peterson	March-Ford	1:13.85	+1.08
10	51	(Japan) Masahiro Hasemi	Kojima-Ford	1:13.88	+1.11
11	26	(France) Jacques Laffite	Ligier-Matra	1:13.88	+1.11
12	12	(Germany) Jochen Mass	McLaren-Ford	1:14.05	+1.28
13	4	(France) Patrick Depailler	Tyrrell-Ford	1:14.15	+1.38
14	16	(United Kingdom) Tom Pryce	Shadow-Ford	1:14.23	+1.46
15	17	(France) Jean-Pierre Jarier	Shadow-Ford	1:14.32	+1.55
16	6	(Sweden) Gunnar Nilsson	Lotus-Ford	1:14.35	+1.58
17	7	(Australia) Larry Perkins	Brabham-Alfa Romeo	1:14.38	+1.61
18	34	(Germany) Hans-Joachim Stuck	March-Ford	1:14.38	+1.61
19	20	(Italy) Arturo Merzario	Wolf-Williams-Ford	1:14.41	+1.64
20	19	(Australia) Alan Jones	Surtees-Ford	1:14.60	+1.83
21	52	(Japan) Kazuyoshi Hoshino	Tyrrell-Ford	1:14.65	+1.88
22	24	(Austria) Harald Ertl	Hesketh-Ford	1:15.26	+2.49
23	30	(Brazil) Emerson Fittipaldi	Fittipaldi-Ford	1:15.30	+2.53
24	18	(Japan) Noritake Takahara	Surtees-Ford	1:15.77	+3.00
25	21	(Austria) Hans Binder	Wolf-Williams-Ford	1:17.36	+4.59
26	21	(Japan) Masami Kuwashima	Wolf-Williams-Ford	1:17.90	+5.13
DNQ	54	(United Kingdom) Tony Trimmer	Maki-Ford	1:30.91	+18.14

== Race ==
On race day the weather was very wet with fog and running water at several places on the track. There were intense debates as to whether the race should be started; in the end the organisers decided to go ahead and a majority of drivers did not disagree. Some drivers, including Lauda, were not happy with the decision.

Hunt took the lead from the start with Watson and Andretti behind. On the second lap Watson slid down an escape road and Lauda drove into the pits to withdraw, as he believed the weather conditions made the track too dangerous. He later said "my life is worth more than a title." Larry Perkins made a similar decision after one lap, as did Pace and Emerson Fittipaldi later in the race.

Hunt continued to lead, behind him second place passed between Andretti and Brambilla. On lap 22 Brambilla challenged for the lead but spun out of contention before retiring 15 laps later with electrical problems. Jochen Mass moved into second before crashing on the 36th lap just before turn 7, promoting Patrick Depailler into the position with Andretti third.

It seemed Hunt was on for an easy win, but as the track began to dry he started to lose positions. He only needed a fourth place finish to win the title, because of Lauda's retirement. On lap 62 Hunt fell behind Depailler and Andretti, but two laps later Depailler's left rear tyre started to deflate and he had to pit. Andretti took the lead, but then Hunt had a similar tyre problem. Hunt pitted, dropped to fifth and set off after Depailler, Alan Jones and Regazzoni. Depailler overtook both drivers on lap 70 and on the next lap Hunt did the same and overtook both of them in order to win the World Drivers' Championship. There was brief confusion as the immediate unofficial finish marked him as fifth place, but with quick deliberation the official finish was third. Ferrari won the Constructors' Championship despite Lauda's retirement.

Andretti's victory was his second in Formula One, coming five years, seven months and 18 days after his maiden win at the 1971 South African Grand Prix. As of 2024, this is the longest period between a first and second victory of a driver in the series.

=== Race classification ===
Pos	No	Driver	Constructor	Tyre	Laps	Time/Retired	Grid	Points
1	5	(United States) Mario Andretti	Lotus-Ford	G	73	1:43:58.86	1	9
2	4	(France) Patrick Depailler	Tyrrell-Ford	G	72	+ 1 Lap	13	6
3	11	(United Kingdom) James Hunt	McLaren-Ford	G	72	+ 1 Lap	2	4
4	19	(Australia) Alan Jones	Surtees-Ford	G	72	+ 1 Lap	20	3
5	2	(Switzerland) Clay Regazzoni	Ferrari	G	72	+ 1 Lap	7	2
6	6	(Sweden) Gunnar Nilsson	Lotus-Ford	G	72	+ 1 Lap	16	1
7	26	(France) Jacques Laffite	Ligier-Matra	G	72	+ 1 Lap	11	
8	24	(Austria) Harald Ertl	Hesketh-Ford	G	72	+ 1 Lap	22	
9	18	(Japan) Noritake Takahara	Surtees-Ford	G	70	+ 3 Laps	24	
10	17	(France) Jean-Pierre Jarier	Shadow-Ford	G	69	+ 4 Laps	15	
11	51	(Japan) Masahiro Hasemi	Kojima-Ford	D	66	+ 7 Laps	10	
Ret	3	(South Africa) Jody Scheckter	Tyrrell-Ford	G	58	Overheating	5	
Ret	21	(Austria) Hans Binder	Wolf-Williams-Ford	G	49	Wheel	25	
Ret	16	(United Kingdom) Tom Pryce	Shadow-Ford	G	46	Energy	14	
Ret	9	(Italy) Vittorio Brambilla	March-Ford	G	38	Electrical	8	
Ret	34	(Germany) Hans-Joachim Stuck	March-Ford	G	37	Electrical	18	
Ret	12	(Germany) Jochen Mass	McLaren-Ford	G	35	Accident	12	
Ret	28	(United Kingdom) John Watson	Penske-Ford	G	33	Engine	4	
Ret	52	(Japan) Kazuyoshi Hoshino	Tyrrell-Ford	B	27	Tyre	21	
Ret	20	(Italy) Arturo Merzario	Wolf-Williams-Ford	G	23	Gearbox	19	
Ret	30	(Brazil) Emerson Fittipaldi	Fittipaldi-Ford	G	9	Withdrew	23	
Ret	8	(Brazil) Carlos Pace	Brabham-Alfa Romeo	G	7	Withdrew	6	
Ret	1	(Austria) Niki Lauda	Ferrari	G	2	Withdrew	3	
Ret	7	(Australia) Larry Perkins	Brabham-Alfa Romeo	G	1	Withdrew	17	
Ret	10	(Sweden) Ronnie Peterson	March-Ford	G	0	Engine	9	
DNS	21	(Japan) Masami Kuwashima	Wolf-Williams-Ford	G				
DNQ	54	(United Kingdom) Tony Trimmer	Maki-Ford	D				

- In Japan, the formal name of this Formula One event was not "Japanese Grand Prix" but was "Formula One World Championship in Japan" (F1世界選手権・イン・ジャパン), because an event of the Japanese Formula 2000 championship had been named "Japanese Grand Prix" in 1976.
- It was initially announced that the fastest lap was set by Masahiro Hasemi on lap 25, but this was a measurement mistake, and, several days later, the circuit issued a press release to correct the fastest lap holder of the race to Jacques Laffite with a time of 1:19.97 on lap 70. This press release was promptly made known in Japan, and the Japan Automobile Federation (JAF) and Japanese media corrected the record. But this correction was not made well known outside Japan, thus, Hasemi is credited with the fastest lap of the race in many record books.

== Notes ==
- This was the Formula One World Championship debut for Austrian driver Hans Binder and Japanese drivers Noritake Takahara, Masami Kuwashima, Masahiro Hasemi, and Kazuyoshi Hoshino.
- This was the Formula One World Championship debut for Japanese constructor Kojima.
- This race marked the 1st fastest lap for Ligier.

== Final Championship standings ==
Drivers' Championship standings

	Pos	Driver	Points
1	1	(United Kingdom) **James Hunt***	69
1	2	(Austria) Niki Lauda	68
	3	(South Africa) Jody Scheckter	49
	4	(France) Patrick Depailler	39
	5	(Switzerland) Clay Regazzoni	31

Constructors' Championship standings

	Pos	Constructor	Points
	1	(Italy) **Ferrari***	83
	2	(United Kingdom) McLaren-Ford	74 (75)
	3	(United Kingdom) Tyrrell-Ford	71
2	4	(United Kingdom) Lotus-Ford	29
1	5	(United States) Penske-Ford	20

- Note: Only the top five positions are included for both sets of standings. Only the best 7 results from the first 8 races and the best 7 results from the last 8 races counted towards the Championship. Numbers without parentheses are Championship points; numbers in parentheses are total points scored.
- Competitors in bold and marked with an asterisk are the 1976 World Champions.

Previous race: 1976 United States Grand Prix	FIA Formula One World Championship; 1976 season	Next race: 1977 Argentine Grand Prix
Previous race: 1975 Japanese Grand Prix	Japanese Grand Prix	Next race: 1977 Japanese Grand Prix
