= Hitoshi Ogawa =

Japanese racing driver

Hitoshi Ogawa (小河等, Ogawa Hitoshi; February 15, 1956 – May 24, 1992) was a Japanese racing car driver. He is the father of Ryo Ogawa, the 2015 Japanese Formula 3 champion.

== Career ==
During the 1980s, Ogawa competed in several Fuji Grand Champion Series races. He won the 1989 All Japan Formula 3000 Championship and finished second in the same championship in 1990. In the same year, teaming up with Masanori Sekiya, he won the JAF Grand Prix All Japan Fuji 500km, held at Fuji. In 1992, he won the first round of the World Sportscar Championship in Monza in C1, partnering Geoff Lees.

=== Complete Japanese Formula 3 results ===
(key) (Races in bold indicate pole position) (Races in italics indicate fastest lap)

Year	Team	Engine	1	2	3	4	5	6	7	8	9	10	DC	Pts
1981	gallop wheel Hayashi	Toyota	SUZ	TSU	FUJ; 5	MIN	SUG; C	TSU; 4	MIN; Ret	SUZ; 5	SUZ; Ret		8th	28
1982	Racing Team Hayashi	Toyota	SUZ; Ret	FUJ	MIN	SUZ; Ret	SUG; Ret	MIN; 4	SUZ; 2	TSU; 5	SUZ; 5		6th	37
1987	TOM'S	Toyota	SUZ; 3	TSU; Ret	FUJ; 3	SUZ; 2	SUG; 2	SEN; 2	MIN; 1	TSU; 2	SUZ; 1	SUZ; 5	2nd	112
1988	Funaki Racing	Toyota	SUZ; Ret	TSU; 2	FUJ; 2	SUZ; Ret	SUG; Ret	TSU; 7	SEN; 3	SUZ; 1	MIN; 5	SUZ; 11	4th	27

=== Japanese Formula 2 / Formula 3000 Championship results ===
(key) (Races in bold indicate pole position) (Races in italics indicate fastest lap)

Year	Team	1	2	3	4	5	6	7	8	9	10	11	DC	Pts
1983	VOLK Rays Racing	SUZ; 13	FSW	MIN	SUZ; Ret	SUZ	FSW	SUZ; 10	SUZ; DNS				19th	1
1984	VOLK Rays Racing	SUZ; 8	FSW; 10	MIN	SUZ; Ret	SUZ; DNS	FSW; 10	SUZ; Ret	SUZ; 14				18th	5
1988	Leyton House Racing Team	SUZ	FSW	MIN	SUZ; 12	SUG; 12	FSW; 11	SUZ; 11	SUZ; 8				NC	0
1989	Auto Beaurex Motorsport	SUZ; 2	FSW; 2	MIN; 4	SUZ; 4	SUG; Ret	**FSW**; 2	**SUZ**; 1	**SUZ**; Ret				**1st**	**33**
1990	Stellar International	SUZ; 11	FSW; 2	MIN; 2	**SUZ**; Ret	SUG; 4	FSW; 6	FSW; 12	**SUZ**; 2	FSW; 2	**SUZ**; 2		**2nd**	**34**
1991	Stellar International	SUZ; 2	AUT; 6	FSW; 3	MIN; Ret	SUZ; 2	SUG; 17	FSW; 12	SUZ; 5	FSW; C	SUZ; 6	FSW; Ret	5th	20
1992	Racing Team Cerumo	SUZ	FSW	MIN	SUZ; 5	AUT	SUG	FSW	FSW	SUZ	FSW	FSW	16th	2

=== 24 Hours of Le Mans results ===
Year	Team	Co-Drivers	Car	Class	Laps	Pos.	Class Pos.
1988	(Japan) Toyota Team Tom's	(United Kingdom) Tiff Needell (Italy) Paolo Barilla	Toyota 88C	C1	283	24th	15th
1989	(Japan) Toyota Team Tom's	(Italy) Paolo Barilla (United States) Ross Cheever	Toyota 89C-V	C1	45	DNF	DNF
1990	(Japan) Toyota Team Tom's	(Japan) Masanori Sekiya (United Kingdom) Geoff Lees	Toyota 90C-V	C1	347	6th	6th

== Death ==
Ogawa was killed in an accident on lap 27 of an All-Japan Formula 3000 race held at Suzuka in May 1992. Ogawa aimed to overtake Andrew Gilbert-Scott's car on the main straight, but the latter held his position while Ogawa moved slightly to the side. He clipped the rear left wheel and the front of his car became lodged in the rear bodywork. Both went down the straight at speed and went into the gravel trap, which was insufficient in slowing down either car. Gilbert-Scott spun, hit the tyre wall and flipped, landing upside-down. Ogawa went in nose-first, hit a mound in the gravel trap and was launched over the tyre barrier, hitting a high-fence supporting pole. Both cars were wrecked and the race was stopped immediately. As a result of the accident, at least one cameraman, several photographers, and Gilbert-Scott all sustained injuries. Ogawa was freed but had suffered severe leg, head and neck injuries and was pronounced dead on the way to hospital.

Ogawa was supposed to race for the Toyota TOM'S team at the 1992 24 Hours of Le Mans. He was replaced by David Brabham for the race. The team subsequently used the number 36, the age of Ogawa's passing, as a tribute to him.

Sporting positions
Preceded by Aguri Suzuki	Japanese Formula 3000; Champion; 1989	Succeeded by Kazuyoshi Hoshino
