= Kojima Engineering =

Automobile manufacturer

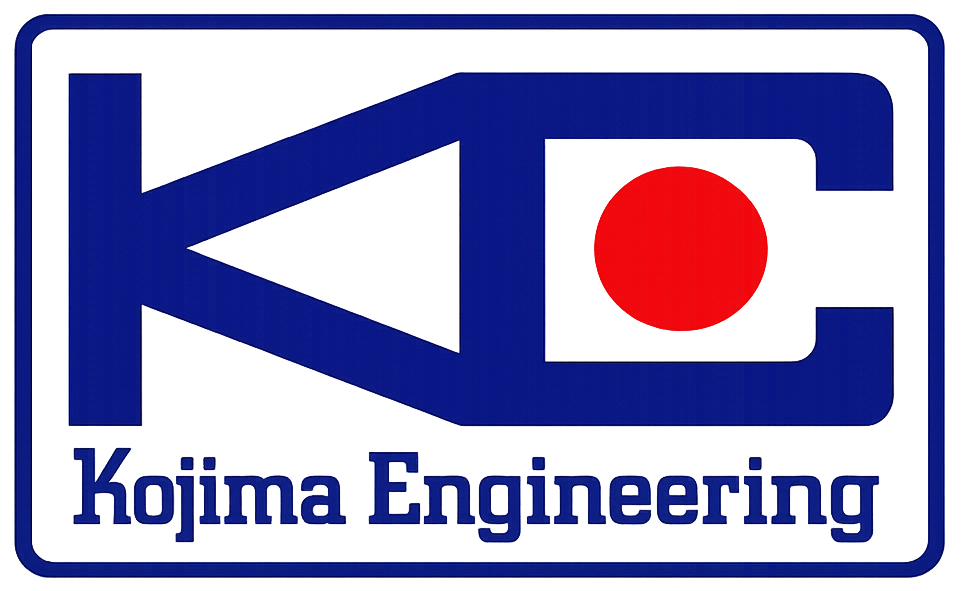
- Full name: Kojima Engineering
- Base: Japan
- Founder(s): Matsuhisa Kojima
- Noted drivers: (Japan) Masahiro Hasemi

Formula One World Championship career
- First entry: 1976 Japanese Grand Prix
- Races entered: 2
- Constructors: Kojima-Ford
- Drivers' Championships: 0
- Race victories: 0
- Pole positions: 0
- Fastest laps: 0
- Final entry: 1977 Japanese Grand Prix

Kojima Engineering was a Japanese Formula One constructor who entered cars in the Japanese Grand Prix in 1976 and 1977.

== Origins ==
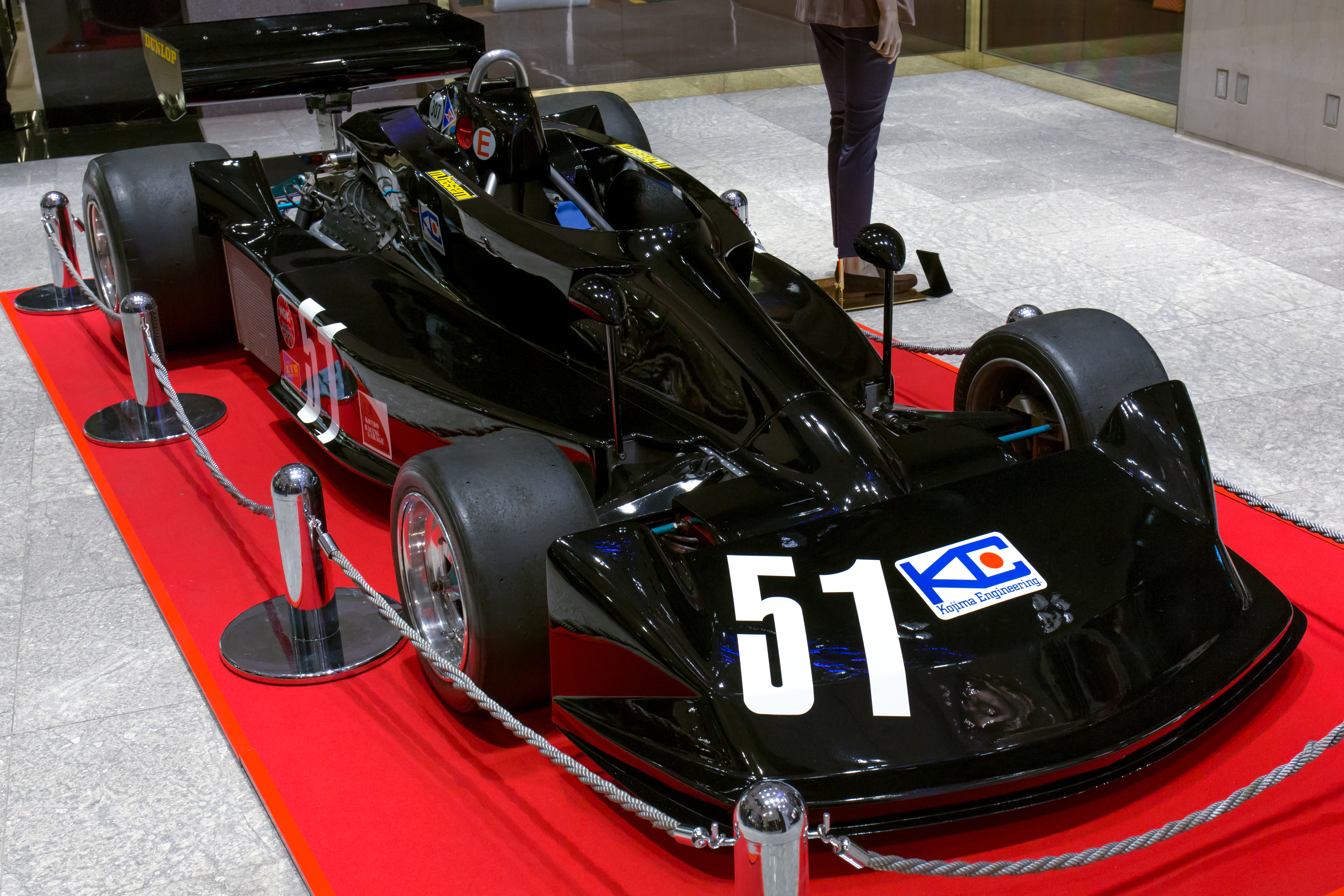
The KE007 on display at Yurakucho Marion in 2013.

Kojima had made a fortune importing bananas, and was a motor-racing enthusiast, having ridden in Motocross himself in the 1960s. He then developed and sold racing versions of various Suzuki motorcycles, an endeavour which ended when Suzuki themselves began producing competition machinery. His first involvement with cars was in selling tuning kits for the Suzuki Fronte's LC10 engine, and then moving on to building a series of Suzuki-engined race cars for the FJ360 category (later models for the FL500 category). He then began entering Formula Two cars in Japan, and after having had major success he struck a deal with Dunlop to supply tyres for the 1976 Japanese Grand Prix.

== History ==
The F1 team was founded in 1976 by Matsuhisa Kojima. Taking advantage of their position as a Dunlop tire supplier for the 1976 Japanese GP, the company constructed the KE007 chassis, bringing in several staff members from the Maki team. They helped arrange an entry for the Grand Prix at Fuji, and a Cosworth DFV engine.

The car was tested throughout the autumn of 1976, with Masahiro Hasemi, a Japanese Formula 2 driver, at the wheel. Hasemi then scored a huge stir at the Japanese Grand Prix, posting 4th best time in the first qualifying session. However, he crashed in the second session, and the car had to be rebuilt virtually from scratch. Hasemi started 10th, and ran superbly before tyre trouble led to an eventual 11th place. He was initially credited with fastest lap, but this was a timekeeping mistake, and, several days later, the circuit issued a press release to correct the fastest lap holder of the race to Jacques Laffite.

A planned entry into the 1977 South American races was cancelled, but the team built a new Kojima KE009 for the 1977 Japanese Grand Prix. The KE008 which was presented in between was a BMW M12-engined Formula Two car, essentially a scaled down version of the KE007/009 cars. Bridgestone supplied the tyres for the 009, but these were unsatisfactory, and Noritake Takahara started only 19th before crashing avoiding debris. A second KE009 was entered by Heros Racing for the same race, Kazuyoshi Hoshino starting and finishing 11th. During that same year, Kojima also won the Suzuka Formula Championship with Kunimitsu Takahashi.

Kojima continued as an F2 entrant until the late 1980s, but did not venture again beyond domestic racing.

== Types ==
- KE-FJ - Suzuki-engined open wheel racer for the 360 cc FJ360 category, later for the 500 cc FL500 category. The series was built from 1971 until 1975 in models I, II, IIB, and III.
- KE007 - Formula One car designed by Masao Ono, Cosworth DFV V8 engine.
- KE008 - Formula Two car designed by Masao Ono, derived from the 007 but somewhat slimmer and more aerodynamic. 2-litre BMW M12 engine and Hewland FGA five-speed transmission; it premiered at the May 1977 All-Japan Formula 2000 Race at Suzuka Circuit and won its first race with Masahiro Hasemi at the wheel.
- KE009 - Formula One car designed by Masao Ono, Cosworth DFV V8 engine. An updated 007 with a lighter monocoque and altered bodywork; two cars raced in the 1977 Japanese Grand Prix.
- KE010 - Ground effect Formula One car developed but not completed as Kojima did not have wind tunnel access. Kojima's last go at F1.

== Complete Formula One World Championship results ==
(key) (results in italics indicate fastest lap)

Year	Entrant	Chassis	Engine	Tyres	Drivers	1	2	3	4	5	6	7	8	9	10	11	12	13	14	15	16	17	Points	WCC
1976	Kojima Engineering	Kojima KE007	Ford V8	D		BRA	RSA	USW	ESP	BEL	MON	SWE	FRA	GBR	GER	AUT	NED	ITA	CAN	USA	JPN		0	NC
1976	Kojima Engineering	Kojima KE007	Ford V8	D	(Japan) Masahiro Hasemi																11		0	NC
1977	Kojima Engineering	Kojima KE009	Ford V8	B		ARG	BRA	RSA	USW	ESP	MON	BEL	SWE	FRA	GBR	GER	AUT	NED	ITA	USA	CAN	JPN	0	NC
1977	Kojima Engineering	Kojima KE009	Ford V8	B	(Japan) Noritake Takahara																	Ret	0	NC
1977	Heros Racing	Kojima KE009	Ford V8	B	(Japan) Kazuyoshi Hoshino																	11	0	NC

== Notes ==
1. It was initially announced that the fastest lap at the 1976 Japanese Grand Prix was set by Masahiro Hasemi in a Kojima, but this was a measurement mistake, and, several days later, the circuit issued a press release to correct the fastest lap holder of the race to Jacques Laffite in a Ligier. This release was promptly made known in Japan, and the Japan Automobile Federation (JAF) and Japanese media corrected the record. This correction was not well distributed outside Japan, and thus, Kojima is incorrectly credited with a fastest lap in many record books.
