= 1988 Japanese Formula 3000 Championship =

Racing series

Seasons
- ← 1987 1989 →

The 1988 Japanese Formula 3000 Championship was contested over 8 rounds. 18 different teams, 24 different drivers, 5 different chassis and 3 different engines competed.

== Calendar ==
Race No	Track	Country	Date	Laps	Distance	Time	Speed	Winner	Pole position	Fastest race lap
1	Suzuka	Japan	13 March 1988	35	5.864=205.241 km	1'07:41.170	181.935 km/h	Kazuyoshi Hoshino	Kazuyoshi Hoshino	Aguri Suzuki
2	Fuji	Japan	17 April 1988	45	4.470=201.15 km	1'01:34.523	196.004 km/h	Aguri Suzuki	Aguri Suzuki	Aguri Suzuki
3	Nishinihon	Japan	8 May 1988	72	2.816=202.752 km	1'16:05.876	159.861 km/h	Aguri Suzuki	Aguri Suzuki	Aguri Suzuki
4	Suzuka	Japan	29 May 1988	35	5.864=205.241 km	1'07:42.494	181.875 km/h	Aguri Suzuki	Aguri Suzuki	Kazuyoshi Hoshino
5	Sugo	Japan	31 July 1988	54	3.704=200.016 km	1'09:00.620	173.901 km/h	Geoff Lees	Ross Cheever	Kazuyoshi Hoshino
6	Fuji	Japan	14 August 1988	45	4.470=201.15 km	1'02:27.678	193.224 km/h	Takao Wada	Geoff Lees	Takao Wada
7	Suzuka	Japan	25 September 1988	35	5.864=205.241 km	1'14:58.537	164.246 km/h	Kazuyoshi Hoshino	Kazuyoshi Hoshino	Takao Wada
8	Suzuka	Japan	27 November 1988	35	5.864=205.241 km	1'06:30.016	185.179 km/h	Kazuyoshi Hoshino	Masanori Sekiya	Kazuyoshi Hoshino

== Final point standings ==
=== Driver ===
For every race points were awarded: 9 points to the winner, 6 for runner-up, 4 for third place, 3 for fourth place, 2 for fifth place and 1 for sixth place. No additional points were awarded. The best 6 results count. Two drivers had a point deduction, which are given in ().

Place	Name	Country	Team	Chassis	Engine	(Japan)	(Japan)	(Japan)	(Japan)	(Japan)	(Japan)	(Japan)	(Japan)	Total points
1	Aguri Suzuki	Japan	Footwork Racing International	March	Cosworth-Yamaha	6	9	9	9	-	6			45
1	Aguri Suzuki	Japan	Footwork Racing International	Reynard	Cosworth-Yamaha							6	-	45
2	Kazuyoshi Hoshino	Japan	Team Impul	Lola	Mugen Honda	9	6	4	6	(4)	-	9	9	43 (47)
3	Emanuele Pirro	Italy	Team LeMans	March	Mugen Honda	-	(2)	6	3					25 (27)
3	Emanuele Pirro	Italy	Team LeMans	Reynard	Mugen Honda					6	3	4	3	25 (27)
4	Masanori Sekiya	Japan	Leyton House Racing	Lola	Mugen Honda	-	4	1	4	-	-	3	6	18
5	Geoff Lees	United Kingdom	Team LeMans	March	Mugen Honda	3	-	3	-					15
5	Geoff Lees	United Kingdom	Team LeMans	Reynard	Mugen Honda					9	-	-	-	15
	Takao Wada	Japan	Advan Sport Pal	March	Mugen Honda	2								15
	Takao Wada	Japan	Advan Sport Pal	Lola	Mugen Honda		-	-	-	3	9	1	-	15
7	Kunimitsu Takahashi	Japan	Team Nova	Lola	Mugen Honda	4	-	-	2	1	4	-	1	12
8	Hideki Okada	Japan	Team Nova	Lola	Mugen Honda	-	3	2	1	-	2	-	2	10
9	Ross Cheever	United States	Dome	March	Cosworth-Yamaha	1	-	-	-					4
9	Ross Cheever	United States	Dome	Reynard	Cosworth-Yamaha					1	2	-	-	4
	Masahiro Hasemi	Japan	Speed Star Wheel Racing Team	Lola	Mugen Honda	-	-	-	-	-	-	-	4	4
11	Ukyo Katayama	Japan	Ba-Tsu Racing	Lola	Mugen Honda	-	-	-	-	2	-	-	-	2
12	Keiji Matsumoto	Japan	Meiju Racing	March	Mugen Honda	-	1	-	-	-	-	-	-	1

== Complete Overview ==
first column of every race	10	= grid position

second column of every race	10	= race result

R=retired NS=did not start NQ=did not qualify

Place	Name	Country	Team	Chassis	Engine	(Japan)		(Japan)		(Japan)		(Japan)		(Japan)		(Japan)		(Japan)		(Japan)
1	Aguri Suzuki	Japan	Footwork Racing International	Footwork	Cosworth-Yamaha	18
1	Aguri Suzuki	Japan	Footwork Racing International	March	Cosworth-Yamaha		2	1	1	1	1	1	1	4	R	4	2
1	Aguri Suzuki	Japan	Footwork Racing International	Reynard	Cosworth-Yamaha													3	2	4	R
2	Kazuyoshi Hoshino	Japan	Team Impul	Lola	Mugen Honda	1	1	5	2	3	3	3	2	5	3	2	R	1	1	3	1
3	Emanuele Pirro	Italy	Team LeMans	March	Mugen Honda	17	9	16	5	5	2	8	4
3	Emanuele Pirro	Italy	Team LeMans	Reynard	Mugen Honda									8	2	13	4	5	3	12	4
4	Masanori Sekiya	Japan	Leyton House Racing	March	Mugen Honda	3	R
4	Masanori Sekiya	Japan	Leyton House Racing	Lola	Mugen Honda			2	3	6	6	2	3	3	R	3	R	4	4	1	2
5	Geoff Lees	United Kingdom	Team LeMans	March	Mugen Honda	6	4	3	13	2	4	5	R
5	Geoff Lees	United Kingdom	Team LeMans	Reynard	Mugen Honda									2	1	1	R	2	R	2	R
	Takao Wada	Japan	Advan Sport Pal	March	Mugen Honda	4	5
	Takao Wada	Japan	Advan Sport Pal	Lola	Mugen Honda			11	7	13	R	6	R	10	4	6	1	11	6	11	10
7	Kunimitsu Takahashi	Japan	Team Nova	Lola	Mugen Honda	5	3	7	R	15	7	7	5	11	6	10	3	7	10	10	6
8	Hideki Okada	Japan	Team Nova	Lola	Mugen Honda	2	R	4	4	4	5	4	6	7	7	7	5	6	R	13	5
9	Ross Cheever	United States	Dome	March	Cosworth-Yamaha	9	6	8	8	8	12	10	R
9	Ross Cheever	United States	Dome	Reynard	Cosworth-Yamaha									1	14	9	6	9	5	22	R
	Masahiro Hasemi	Japan	Speed Star Wheel Racing Team	Lola	Mugen Honda	8	R	6	R	11	8	11	13	9	8	12	7	16	R	7	3
11	Ukyo Katayama	Japan	Ba-Tsu Racing	March	Mugen Honda	13	11	13	R	7	R	14	7
11	Ukyo Katayama	Japan	Ba-Tsu Racing	Lola	Mugen Honda									6	5	8	8	12	12	5	R
12	Keiji Matsumoto	Japan	Meiju Racing	March	Mugen Honda	7	13	10	6			9	R	-	-
12	Keiji Matsumoto	Japan	Meiju Racing	Lola	Mugen Honda					10	R					5	R	15	16	6	R
-	Akio Morimoto	Japan	Cabin Racing/Heroes	March	Mugen Honda	10	10	12	R	12	11	16	8	17	R
-	Akio Morimoto	Japan	Cabin Racing/Heroes	Reynard	Mugen Honda											11	R	8	7	14	7
-	Eje Elgh	Sweden	Sundai Spilit Team	Lola	Mugen Honda	15	7	14	12	14	10	18	10	16	9	15	9	14	9	16	9
-	Kenny Acheson	United Kingdom	Team Kitamura	March	Mugen Honda	11	8	9	R	9	9	12	15	14	R	14	14	-	-	-	-
-	Dave Scott	United Kingdom	Footwork Racing International	Mooncraft	Cosworth	-	-	-	-	-	-	-	-	-	-	16	10	10	8
-	Dave Scott	United Kingdom	Checker Motor Sports Club	Lola	Cosworth															19	R
-	Hitoshi Ogawa	Japan	Leyton House Racing	March	Mugen Honda	-	-	-	-	-	-	13	12	13	12	17	11	13	11	8	8
-	Masatomo Shimizu	Japan	Shimizu Racing	Lola	Cosworth	12	12	15	9	-	-	15	9	12	10	18	12	17	13	20	R
-	Kazuo Mogi	Japan	Sics Racing	March	Cosworth	16	R	18	10	16	R
-	Kazuo Mogi	Japan	Sics Racing	Lola	Cosworth							19	11	19	R	19	R	19	15	18	11
-	Tetsuya Ota	Japan	Checker Motor Sports Club	Lola	Cosworth	14	R	19	11	-	-	20	14	15	11	20	R	21	R	-	-
-	Hideshi Matsuda	Japan	Takeshi Project Racing	March	Cosworth	-	-	17	NS	17	13	17	R	18	13	21	13	18	14	17	12
-	Jeff Krosnoff	United States	Speed Star Wheel Racing	Lola	Mugen Honda	-	-	-	-	-	-	-	-	-	-	-	-	-	-	15	13
-	Katsunori Iketani	Japan	Supercard Racing	March	Cosworth	-	-	-	-	-	-	-	-	-	-	-	-	20	NQ	21	R
-	Mark Blundell	United Kingdom	Footwork Racing International	Mooncraft	Cosworth	-	-	-	-	-	-	-	-	-	-	-	-	-	-	9	R
