= Heros Racing =

- Full name: Heros Racing Corporation
- Base: Japan
- Noted drivers: (Japan) Kazuyoshi Hoshino

Formula One World Championship career
- First entry: 1976 Japanese Grand Prix
- Races entered: 2
- Constructors: Tyrrell; Kojima
- Constructors' Championships: 0
- Drivers' Championships: 0
- Race victories: 0
- Podiums: 0
- Points: 0
- Pole positions: 0
- Fastest laps: 0
- Final entry: 1977 Japanese Grand Prix

Heros Racing (listed in some sources as Heroes Racing) was a Japanese motor racing team which competed briefly in Formula One in the 1976 and 1977 seasons. The team entered the 1976 and 1977 Japanese Grands Prix, each time with local driver Kazuyoshi Hoshino with a best result of 11th in 1977. The team also competed in two races in the 1978 European Formula Two Championship and in Japanese top formula racing.

== Racing history ==
=== Formula One ===
The team's first F1 race was the 1976 Japanese Grand Prix, where Hoshino qualified 21st using an outdated Tyrrell 007. However, in the race, run in very wet conditions, he placed as high as third at one point before having to pit for replacement tyres. He was forced to retire on lap 28 (of 73), having used all his available tyres.

At the 1977 event, the team entered Hoshino in a Kojima KE009. He qualified 11th ahead of several works entries and also finished 11th, two laps down.

=== Formula Two ===
Heros Racing, with Hoshino driving, competed in two races in the 1978 European Formula Two Championship using a Nova-BMW, but did not score any points.

=== Japanese Top Formula racing ===
The Japanese Top Formula series (also known as the Super Formula Championship) was the premier single-seater domestic series run to various formulae over several years. In 1973, Motoharu Kurosawa, driving a March 722 for Heros Racing, won the inaugural series run to Formula 2000 rules. This success was repeated in 1976 with Noritake Takahara driving a Nova-BMW and again in 1977 with Hoshino using a Nova. In 1978, the series moved to Formula Two rules and Hoshino again took the title with a Nova-BMW.

In 1984, 1985 and 1986 the team achieved a further hat-trick of title wins with Japanese driver Satoru Nakajima in a March-Honda, and one further title in 1991 for Ukyo Katayama (Lola-Cosworth DFV) when the series had moved on to Formula 3000 regulations.

== Complete Formula One results ==
(key)

Year	Chassis	Engine	Driver	1	2	3	4	5	6	7	8	9	10	11	12	13	14	15	16	17	WDC	Points
1976	Tyrrell 007	Cosworth V8	Kazuyoshi Hoshino	BRA	RSA	USW	ESP	BEL	MON	SWE	FRA	GBR	GER	AUT	NED	ITA	CAN	USA	JPN; Ret		NC	0
1977	Kojima KE009	Cosworth V8	Kazuyoshi Hoshino	ARG	BRA	RSA	USW	ESP	MON	BEL	SWE	FRA	GBR	GER	AUT	NED	ITA	USA	CAN	JPN; 11	NC	0
