= 1990 Japanese Formula 3000 Championship =

Seasons
- ← 1989 1991 →

The 1990 Japanese Formula 3000 Championship was contested over 10 rounds. 25 different teams, 38 different drivers, 4 different chassis and 2 different engines competed.

== Calendar ==
All events took place at venues located within the country of Japan.

Race No	Track	Lap Length	Date	Laps	Distance	Time	Speed	Winner	Pole position	Fastest race lap
1	Suzuka	5.864 km	4 March 1990	35	205.241 km	1'05:07.183	189.105 km/h	Kazuyoshi Hoshino	Kazuyoshi Hoshino	Ross Cheever
2	Fuji	4.470 km	15 April 1990	45	201.15 km	1'00:26.740	199.667 km/h	Kazuyoshi Hoshino	Kazuyoshi Hoshino	Takao Wada
3	Nishinihon	2.816 km	13 May 1990	72	202.752 km	1'14:51.717	161.053 km/h	Keiji Matsumoto	Keiji Matsumoto	Hitoshi Ogawa
4	Suzuka	5.864 km	27 May 1990	35	205.241 km	1'05:32.223	187.901 km/h	Keiji Matsumoto	Hitoshi Ogawa	Takao Wada
5	Sugo	3.704 km	29 July 1990	37	137.048 km	0'46:44.016	175.952 km/h	Mauro Martini	Masanori Sekiya	Kunimitsu Takahashi
6	Fuji	4.470 km	12 August 1990	44	196.68 km	1'04:13.952	183.720 km/h	Kazuyoshi Hoshino	Mauro Martini	Ukyo Katayama
7	Fuji	4.470 km	2 September 1990	45	201.15 km	1'00:23.432	199.849 km/h	Kazuyoshi Hoshino	Mauro Martini	Hitoshi Ogawa
8	Suzuka	5.864 km	23 September 1990	35	205.241 km	1'05:32.773	187.874 km/h	Kazuyoshi Hoshino	Hitoshi Ogawa	Kazuyoshi Hoshino
9	Fuji	4.470 km	28 October 1990	43	192.21 km	0'57:05.266	202.015 km/h	Volker Weidler	Volker Weidler	Kazuyoshi Hoshino
10	Suzuka	5.864 km	18 November 1990	35	205.241 km	1'04:36.731	190.590 km/h	Kazuyoshi Hoshino	Hitoshi Ogawa	Hitoshi Ogawa

== Final point standings ==
=== Driver ===
The scoring system was 9-6-4-3-2-1 points awarded to the first six classified drivers. The best seven results counted. One driver had a point deduction, which are given in ().

Place	Name	Country	Team	Chassis	Engine	(Japan)	(Japan)	(Japan)	(Japan)	(Japan)	(Japan)	(Japan)	(Japan)	(Japan)	(Japan)	Total points
1	Kazuyoshi Hoshino	Japan	Team Impul	Lola	Mugen Honda	9	9	(3)	-	4	9	9	9	(2)	9	58 (63)
2	Hitoshi Ogawa	Japan	Stellar International	Lola	Mugen Honda	-	6	6	-	3	1	-	6	6	6	34
3	Mauro Martini	Italy	Suntec Racing	Lola	Mugen Honda	1	2	-	6	9	6	-	3	-	2	29
4	Keiji Matsumoto	Japan	Dome	Lola	Mugen Honda	4	-	9	9	-	-	-	-	-	-	22
5	Ukyo Katayama	Japan	Cabin Racing/Heroes	Lola	Cosworth	-	4	2	-	-	2	6	4	-	-	18
6	Volker Weidler	West Germany	Team Take One	Lola	Mugen Honda	-	-	-	2	-	4	-	-	9	-	15
7	Jeff Krosnoff	United States	Suntec Racing	Lola	Mugen Honda	-	-	-	4	-	-	3	2	-	4	13
8	Ross Cheever	United States	Dome	Reynard	Mugen Honda	6	-	-	-	1	-	1	-	-	-	8
9	Kunimitsu Takahashi	Japan	Advan Sport Nova	Lola	Mugen Honda	-	-	-	3	-	-	4	-	-	-	7
10	Thomas Danielsson	Sweden	Dome	Lola	Mugen Honda	-	-	-	-	6	-	-	-	-	-	6
	Takao Wada	Japan	Advan Sport Pal	Lola	Mugen Honda	-	3	-	-	-	-	-	-	-	3	6
12	Masahiro Hasemi	Japan	Speed Star Wheel Racing Team	Lola	Mugen Honda	3	1	-	1	-	-	-	-	-	-	5
	Akihiko Nakaya	Japan	Team Take One	Lola	Mugen Honda	-	-	-	-	2	3	-	-	-	-	5
14	Enrico Bertaggia	Italy	Footwork Racing International	Lola	Mugen Honda	-	-	4	-	-	-	-	-	-	-	4
	Christian Danner	West Germany	Leyton House Racing	Leyton House	Mugen Honda	-	-	-	-	-	-	-	-	4	-	4
16	Johnny Herbert	United Kingdom	Team LeMans	Reynard	Mugen Honda	-	-	-	-	-	-	2	1	-	-	3
	Takuya Kurosawa	Japan	Team LeMans	Reynard	Mugen Honda	-	-	-	-	-	-	-	-	3	-	3
	Osamu Nakako	Japan	Nakajima Racing	Lola	Mugen Honda	2	-	-	-	-	-	-	-	-	1	3
19	Masahiko Kageyama	Japan	Stellar International	Lola	Mugen Honda	-	-	1	-	-	-	-	-	-	-	1
	Hideki Okada	Japan	Motor Sport Development	Leyton House	Cosworth	-	-	-	-	-	-	-	-	1	-	1

== Complete Overview ==
first column of every race	10	= grid position

second column of every race	10	= race result

R14=retired, but classified R=retired NC=not classified NQ=did not qualify DIS=disqualified

Place	Name	Country	Team	Chassis	Engine	(Japan)		(Japan)		(Japan)		(Japan)		(Japan)		(Japan)		(Japan)		(Japan)		(Japan)		(Japan)
1	Kazuyoshi Hoshino	Japan	Team Impul	Lola	Mugen Honda	1	1	1	1	5	4	3	16	17	3	7	1	2	1	2	1	4	5	2	1
2	Hitoshi Ogawa	Japan	Stellar International	Lola	Mugen Honda	7	11	6	2	2	2	1	R	3	4	3	6	5	12	1	2	7	2	1	2
3	Mauro Martini	Italy	Suntec Racing	Lola	Mugen Honda	21	6	8	5	3	R	5	2	2	1	1	2	1	R	4	4	5	R	5	5
4	Keiji Matsumoto	Japan	Dome	Lola	Mugen Honda	3	3	3	R	1	1	2	1	19	R	20	14	15	R	8	7	26	13	16	R
5	Ukyo Katayama	Japan	Cabin Racing/Heroes	Lola	Cosworth	2	R	4	3	11	5	4	R	25	12	4	5	6	2	5	3	6	R	3	DIS
6	Volker Weidler	West Germany	Team Take One	Lola	Mugen Honda	8	R	15	R	18	11	12	5	23	21	5	3	16	R	19	20	1	1	12	DIS
7	Jeff Krosnoff	United States	Suntec Racing	Lola	Mugen Honda	26	10	9	R	30	NQ	7	3	15	10	9	R	7	4	7	5	8	17	4	3
8	Ross Cheever	United States	Dome	Reynard	Mugen Honda	6	2	2	NS			8	R	6	6	24	R	3	6	3	R	10	10	9	R
8	Ross Cheever	United States	Dome	Lola	Mugen Honda					4	R
9	Kunimitsu Takahashi	Japan	Advan Sport Nova	Lola	Mugen Honda	16	12	5	14	12	7	6	4	8	20	11	10	9	3	16	12	11	8	27	R
10	Thomas Danielsson	Sweden	Dome	Reynard	Mugen Honda	14	7	7	R	8	R
10	Thomas Danielsson	Sweden	Dome	Lola	Mugen Honda							31	NQ	7	2	8	R	18	11	14	10	21	16	19	R
	Takao Wada	Japan	Advan Sport Pal	Lola	Mugen Honda	4	R	14	4	14	R	9	14	11	22	18	7	8	R	9	R	18	R	6	4
12	Masahiro Hasemi	Japan	Speed Star Wheel Racing Team	Lola	Mugen Honda	12	4	10	6	10	R	10	6	18	13	17	8	11	R	12	11	2	12	17	8
	Akihiko Nakaya	Japan	Team Take One	Lola	Mugen Honda	9	R	19	13	25	8	13	R	12	5	2	4	13	R	10	8	9	R	8	R
14	Enrico Bertaggia	Italy	Footwork Racing International	Lola	Mugen Honda	13	14	17	11	7	3	18	R	26	16	13	13	12	R	13	R	24	14	11	7
	Christian Danner	West Germany	Leyton House Racing	Leyton House	Mugen Honda	10	13	12	R	23	9	26	15	14	17	16	R	17	10	21	16	15	3	-	-
16	Johnny Herbert	United Kingdom	Team LeMans	Reynard	Mugen Honda	19	19	24	10	6	R	16	R	4	7	19	R	20	5	6	6	13	R	7	R
	Takuya Kurosawa	Japan	Team LeMans	Reynard	Mugen Honda	11	R	20	9	21	R	14	R	9	18	21	R	19	R	27	19	22	4	21	R
	Osamu Nakako	Japan	Nakajima Racing	Lola	Mugen Honda	5	5	13	7	9	R	15	R	22	R	26	16	21	7	24	9	12	9	20	6
19	Masahiko Kageyama	Japan	Stellar International	Lola	Mugen Honda	25	15	32	NQ	19	6	27	R	21	11	14	R	14	R	17	R	17	NS	15	9
	Hideki Okada	Japan	Motor Sport Development	Leyton House	Cosworth	24	R	21	R	15	12	11	7	27	NQ	25	R	25	13	18	17	20	6	25	R
-	Maurizio Sandro Sala	Brazil	Funaki Racing	Reynard	Mugen Honda	27	16	31	NQ
-	Maurizio Sandro Sala	Brazil	Funaki Racing	Lola	Mugen Honda					26	R	17	8	10	9	15	19	24	15	26	21	14	7	30	NQ
-	Hideshi Matsuda	Japan	Takeshi Project Racing	Lola	Cosworth	29	NQ	16	8	24	13	22	9	5	14	10	9	10	NC	11	13	16	NS	14	10
-	Kazuo Mogi	Japan	Zoom Racing	Lola	Cosworth	-	-	25	R	-	-	25	10	24	23	23	15	26	8	29	NQ	32	NQ	32	NQ
-	Toshio Suzuki	Japan	Super Evolution Racing	Lola	Mugen Honda	22	20	-	-	13	14	23	11	13	8	12	11	22	R	15	22	19	11	26	12
-	Eiki Muramatsu	Japan	Mooncraft	Mooncraft	Mugen Honda	17	8	-	-	-	-	-	-	-	-	-	-	-	-	-	-	-	-	-	-
-	Katsutomo Kaneishi	Japan	Mola C2 Racing	Lola	Mugen Honda	18	R	28	12	22	10	29	NQ	20	15	28	18	23	9	30	NQ	28	R	29	NQ
-	Masanori Sekiya	Japan	Leyton House	Leyton House	Mugen Honda	15	9	18	R	16	R	19	R	1	19	6	R	4	R	22	14	3	R	10	R
-	Koji Sato	Japan	Nakajima Racing	Reynard	Mugen Honda	20	R	27	R	20	15	24	17	28	NQ	29	NQ	28	14	23	R	25	R	23	11
-	Philippe Favre	Switzerland	Team Noji International	Lola	Mugen Honda	-	-	-	-	-	-	20	13	16	R	22	12	-	-	-	-	-	-	-	-
-	Masatomo Shimizu	Japan	Shimizu Racing	Lola	Mugen Honda	28	18	29	NQ	-	-	28	12	-	-	31	NQ	33	NQ	32	NQ	-	-	-	-
-	Katsunori Iketani	Japan	Super Card Racing	Lola	Mugen Honda	23	17	22	R	-	-	21	R	29	NQ	27	17	30	NQ	25	R	29	NQ	28	13
-	Tetsuya Ota	Japan	CSK Racing	Reynard	Mugen Honda	-	-	26	R	28	NQ	30	NQ	30	NQ
-	Tetsuya Ota	Japan	CSK Racing	Lola	Mugen Honda											32	NQ	29	NQ	28	18	23	R	22	14
-	Roland Ratzenberger	Austria	Team Noji International	Lola	Mugen Honda	31	NQ	11	R	17	R	-	-	-	-	-	-	27	R	20	15	30	NQ	-	-
-	Shunji Kasuya	Japan	Super Evolution Racing	Lola	Mugen Honda	-	-	23	DIS	-	-	-	-	-	-	-	-	31	NQ	-	-	27	15	-	-
-	Kouichi Iwaki	Japan	Team Iwaki	Lola	Mugen Honda	30	NQ	30	R	27	NQ	32	NQ	31	NQ	30	NQ	32	NQ	31	NQ	31	NQ	31	NQ
-	Geoff Lees	United Kingdom	Team Hayashi	Lola	Mugen Honda	-	-	-	-	-	-	-	-	-	-	-	-	-	-	-	-	-	-	13	R
-	Hideo Fukuyama	Japan	Team Noji International	Lola	Mugen Honda	-	-	-	-	-	-	-	-	-	-	-	-	-	-	-	-	-	-	18	R
-	Minoru Tanaka	Japan	Leyton House	Leyton House	Mugen Honda	-	-	-	-	-	-	-	-	-	-	-	-	-	-	-	-	-	-	24	R
