= 1989 Japanese Formula 3000 Championship =

Motor racing competition

Seasons
- ← 1988 1990 →

The 1989 Japanese Formula 3000 Championship was contested over 8 rounds. 17 different teams, 29 different drivers, 5 different chassis and 2 different engines competed.

== Calendar ==
Race No	Track	Country	Date	Laps	Distance	Time	Speed	Winner	Pole position	Fastest race lap
1	Suzuka	Japan	5 March 1989	35	5.864=205.241 km	1'06:25.877	185.371 km/h	Kazuyoshi Hoshino	Kazuyoshi Hoshino	Kazuyoshi Hoshino
2	Fuji	Japan	16 April 1989	45	4.470=201.15 km	1'01:57.969	194.768 km/h	Ross Cheever	Takao Wada	Takao Wada
3	Nishinihon	Japan	14 May 1989	72	2.816=202.752 km	1'15:32.097	161.053 km/h	Ross Cheever	Akihiko Nakaya	Ross Cheever
4	Suzuka	Japan	28 May 1989	35	5.864=205.241 km	1'07:49.646	181.556 km/h	Emanuele Pirro	Kazuyoshi Hoshino	Mauro Martini
5	Sugo	Japan	30 July 1989	51	3.704=188.904 km	1'05:23.820	173.314 km/h	Takao Wada	Masahiro Hasemi	Takao Wada
6	Fuji	Japan	13 August 1989	41	4.470=183.27 km	0'55:41.595	193.224 km/h	Kazuyoshi Hoshino	Hitoshi Ogawa	Takao Wada
7	Suzuka	Japan	24 September 1989	35	5.864=205.241 km	1'06:47.296	184.381 km/h	Hitoshi Ogawa	Hitoshi Ogawa	Hitoshi Ogawa
8	Suzuka	Japan	5 November 1989	35	5.864=205.241 km	1'06:25.107	185.407 km/h	Masahiro Hasemi	Hitoshi Ogawa	Kazuyoshi Hoshino

== Final point standings ==
=== Driver ===
For every race points were awarded: 9 points to the winner, 6 for runner-up, 4 for third place, 3 for fourth place, 2 for fifth place and 1 for sixth place. No additional points were awarded. The best 6 results count. No driver had a point deduction.

Place	Name	Country	Team	Chassis	Engine	(Japan)	(Japan)	(Japan)	(Japan)	(Japan)	(Japan)	(Japan)	(Japan)	Total points
1	Hitoshi Ogawa	Japan	Auto Beaurex Motorsport	Lola	Mugen Honda	6	6	3	3	-	6	9	-	33
2	Ross Cheever	United States	Dome	Reynard	Mugen Honda	-	9	9	6	-	-	6	-	30
3	Kazuyoshi Hoshino	Japan	Team Impul	Lola	Mugen Honda	9	-	-	-	-	9	4	-	22
4	Masahiro Hasemi	Japan	Speed Star Wheel Racing Team	Lola	Mugen Honda	1	3	2	4	-	-	2	9	21
	Masanori Sekiya	Japan	Leyton House Racing	Leyton House	Mugen Honda	4	4	4	-	-	3	-	6	21
6	Emanuele Pirro	Italy	Team LeMans	Reynard	Mugen Honda	2	-	-	9	-	-	-	-	11
7	Takao Wada	Japan	Advan Sport Pal	Lola	Mugen Honda	-	-	-	-	9	-	-	-	9
	Mauro Martini	Italy	Sundai Spilit Team	Lola	Mugen Honda	-	-	-	-	4	2	3	-	9
9	Hideki Okada	Japan	Leyton House Racing	Leyton House	Mugen Honda	-	-	-	2	-	4	-	2	8
10	Paolo Barilla	Italy	Nakajima Racing	Lola	Mugen Honda	-	-	6	-	-	-	-	-	6
	Akihiko Nakaya	Japan	Team Nova	Lola	Mugen Honda	-	-	-	-	6	-	-	-	6
	Jeff Krosnoff	United States	Speed Star Wheel Racing Team	Lola	Mugen Honda	-	2	-	-	-	-	-	4	6
13	Geoff Lees	United Kingdom	Team LeMans	Reynard	Mugen Honda	3	-	-	-	2	-	-	-	5
14	Keiji Matsumoto	Japan	Dome	Reynard	Mugen Honda	-	1	1	-	-	1	1	-	4
15	Kunimitsu Takahashi	Japan	Team Nova	Lola	Mugen Honda	-	-	-	-	3	-	-	-	3
	Marco Apicella	Italy	Team LeMans	Lola	Cosworth	-	-	-	-	-	-	-	3	3
17	Fabrizio Barbazza	Italy	Motor Sport Development	Lola	Cosworth	-	-	-	1	-	-	-	-	1
	Osamu Nakako	Japan	Nakajima Racing	Lola	Mugen Honda	-	-	-	-	1	-	-	-	1
	Toshio Suzuki	Japan	Cabin Racing/Heroes	Reynard	Cosworth	-	-	-	-	-	-	-	1	1

== Complete Overview ==
first column of every race	10	= grid position

second column of every race	10	= race result

R=retired NC=not classified

Place	Name	Country	Team	Chassis	Engine	(Japan)		(Japan)		(Japan)		(Japan)		(Japan)		(Japan)		(Japan)		(Japan)
1	Hitoshi Ogawa	Japan	Auto Beaurex Motorsport	Lola	Mugen Honda	2	2	7	2	6	4	8	4	3	R	1	2	1	1	1	R
2	Ross Cheever	United States	Dome	Reynard	Mugen Honda	12	11	2	1	5	1	2	2	2	R	6	10	6	2	8	12
3	Kazuyoshi Hoshino	Japan	Team Impul	Lola	Mugen Honda	1	1	4	R	4	R	1	R	8	R	2	1	3	3	3	R
4	Masahiro Hasemi	Japan	Speed Star Wheel Racing Team	Lola	Mugen Honda	3	6	9	4	12	5	5	3	1	R	3	8	9	5	4	1
	Masanori Sekiya	Japan	Leyton House Racing	Leyton House	Mugen Honda	5	3	5	3	2	3	11	R	6	R	7	4	7	8	6	2
6	Emanuele Pirro	Italy	Team LeMans	Reynard	Mugen Honda	6	5	8	R	8	R	7	1	-	-	-	-	-	-	-	-
7	Takao Wada	Japan	Advan Sport Pal	Lola	Mugen Honda	13	R	1	R	16	R	13	10	10	1	4	16	5	16	13	R
	Mauro Martini	Italy	Sundai Spirit Team	Lola	Mugen Honda	14	R	20	8	-	-	14	NC	7	3	5	5	2	4	2	14
9	Hideki Okada	Japan	Leyton House Racing	Leyton House	Mugen Honda	10	R	3	R	13	R	6	5	13	R	8	3	10	R	16	5
10	Paolo Barilla	Italy	Nakajima Racing	Lola	Mugen Honda	8	8	10	R	9	2	12	R	9	R	11	R	17	10	11	R
	Akihiko Nakaya	Japan	Team Nova	Lola	Mugen Honda	7	10	11	11	1	R	4	8	4	2	13	7	4	R	5	9
	Jeff Krosnoff	United States	Speed Star Wheel Racing Team	Lola	Mugen Honda	-	-	15	5	11	9	10	R	16	R	16	13	12	9	15	3
13	Geoff Lees	United Kingdom	Team LeMans	Reynard	Mugen Honda	9	4	13	14	3	R	9	15	5	5	9	R	14	13	10	R
14	Keiji Matsumoto	Japan	Dome	Reynard	Mugen Honda	4	14	6	6	7	6	3	R	14	R	10	6	11	6	17	R
15	Kunimitsu Takahashi	Japan	Team Nova	Lola	Mugen Honda	21	12	12	15	19	8	21	12	19	4	15	11	20	14	18	8
	Marco Apicella	Italy	Team LeMans	Lola	Cosworth	-	-	-	-	-	-	-	-	-	-	-	-	-	-	9	4
17	Fabrizio Barbazza	Italy	Motor Sport Development	Reynard	Cosworth	22	R
17	Fabrizio Barbazza	Italy	Motor Sport Development	Lola	Cosworth			18	9	15	11	15	6	22	R	20	19	13	7	19	R
	Osamu Nakako	Japan	Nakajima Racing	Lola	Mugen Honda	16	NC	21	10	10	7	18	11	17	6	18	9	18	15	7	13
	Toshio Suzuki	Japan	Cabin Racing/Heroes	Reynard	Cosworth	17	7	16	R	18	12	20	13	11	8	19	20	15	17	22	6
-	Maurizio Sandro Sala	Brazil	Funaki Racing	Reynard	Mugen Honda	15	13	19	7	14	10	16	7	12	9	12	18	21	11	14	R
-	Ukyo Katayama	Japan	Footwork Racing International	Footwork	Mugen Honda	11	9	17	R	-	-	19	R	18	R	17	15	16	18	12	7
-	Martin Donnelly	United Kingdom	Team Kygnus Tonen	Reynard	Mugen Honda	-	-	-	-	-	-	17	9	20	7	21	R	-	-	-	-
-	Masatomo Shimizu	Japan	Shimizu Racing	Lola	Mugen Honda	18	15	23	13	-	-	22	14	23	10	23	17	19	R	23	11
-	Andrew Gilbert-Scott	United Kingdom	Team Kygnus Tonen	Reynard	Mugen Honda	-	-	-	-	20	13	-	-	-	-	-	-	23	R	20	10
-	Hideshi Matsuda	Japan	Takeshi Project Racing	March	Cosworth	20	R
-	Hideshi Matsuda	Japan	Takeshi Project Racing	Lola	Cosworth			22	12	21	14	23	R	15	R	14	12	8	12	21	R
-	Kenny Acheson	United Kingdom	Team LeMans	Reynard	Mugen Honda	-	-	-	-	-	-	-	-	21	R	22	14	-	-	-	-
-	Jean Alesi	France	Team Kygnus Tonen	Reynard	Mugen Honda	19	R	14	R	-	-	-	-	-	-	-	-	-	-	-	-
-	Steven Andskar	Sweden	Sundai Spilit Team	Lola	Mugen Honda	-	-	-	-	17	R	-	-	-	-	-	-	-	-	-	-
-	Akio Morimoto	Japan	Team LeMans	Reynard	Mugen Honda	-	-	-	-	-	-	-	-	-	-	-	-	22	R	-	-
