= Keiji Matsumoto =

Japanese racing driver

- Nationality: Japanese
- Born: 26 December 1949 Kyoto, Japan
- Died: 17 May 2015 (aged 65)

Previous series
- 1976–1977 1978–1986 1983–1989 1987–1992: All-Japan Formula 2000 Championship; Japanese Formula Two Championship; All Japan Endurance Championship; Japanese Formula 3000 Championship

Championship titles
- 1979 1983: Japanese Formula Two Championship; Fuji Grand Champion Series
24 Hours of Le Mans career
- Years: 1986–1987
- Teams: NISMO
- Best finish: DNF (1986, 1987)
- Class wins: 0

Keiji Matsumoto (松本 恵二, Matsumoto Keiji; 26 December 1949 – 17 May 2015) was a Japanese racing driver who competed at the top level of Japanese Formula racing, currently known as Super Formula, between 1976 and 1992. Under the Japanese Formula 2 moniker, he won the championship in 1979 and was runner-up to future Formula 1 driver Satoru Nakajima in 1982 and 1985.

== Motorsport career ==
Matsumoto scored 11 wins and 29 podium finishes, seventh all-time in both accounts, over a 129-race career, which put him third in all-time Super Formula career starts behind generational peers Kazuyoshi Hoshino and Kunimitsu Takahashi. In a rare overseas foray in 1981, he also took part in the Donington "50.000," a race of the European Formula Two championship, crossing the finish line in 15th place.

Until 1989, Matsumoto also dabbled in Japanese sports car racing, winning the Fuji Grand Champion Series in 1983 and the Fuji 1000 km in 1985 and 1989. In the 1985 win, Matsumoto, Hoshino, and Akira Hagiwara became the first Japanese drivers to ever win a race in the World Sportscar Championship. [4 Hoshino was actually the only one who got to drive the car before the race was stopped early due to heavy rain. Matsumoto also competed in the 1987 24 Hours of Le Mans alongside Hoshino and Kenji Takahashi as an official Nissan driver.

Matsumoto was the first public face of Cabin Racing, begun by Japan Tobacco in 1986, and his appearance in TV commercials brought him wide public attention. After retiring, he remained active in the Japanese motorsports scene and was a driver coach for Shintaro Kawabata, Ryo Michigami, Shinji Nakano, and Juichi Wakisaka, among others.

== Personal life and death ==
Matsumoto was born in Kyoto Prefecture. He died in Kyoto on May 17, 2015 after several years with cirrhosis.

== Racing record ==
=== Japanese Top Formula Championship results ===
(key) (Races in bold indicate pole position) (Races in italics indicate fastest lap)

Year	Entrant	1	2	3	4	5	6	7	8	9	10	11	DC	Points
1976	Matsumoto Racing Union	FUJ	SUZ; Ret	FUJ	SUZ; 8	SUZ; Ret							17th	3
1977	Matsumoto Racing Union	SUZ; 7	SUZ; 5	MIN; 3	SUZ; 6	FUJ; 9	FUJ; 10	SUZ; 7	SUZ; Ret				9th	32 (34)
1978	Matsumoto Racing Union	SUZ; 7	FUJ; 4	SUZ; 6	SUZ; 4	SUZ; 9	MIN; 2	SUZ; 11					5th	50 (60)
1979	Diatone Racing	SUZ; 9	MIN; 1	**SUZ**; 3	FUJ; 1	SUZ; 5	SUZ; 1	SUZ; 5					**1st**	**79 (90)**
1980	Diatone Racing	SUZ; 6	MIN; 3	SUZ; Ret	SUZ; Ret	SUZ; 1	SUZ; 4						4th	42
1981	DHL Team Le Mans	**SUZ**; 1	SUZ; 11	SUZ; 2	**SUZ**; 9	SUZ; Ret							4th	37
1982	Team Le Mans	**SUZ**; 2	FUJ; 4	**SUZ**; 2	SUZ; 2	SUZ; 7	SUZ; Ret						**2nd**	**55 (59)**
1983	Team Le Mans	SUZ; 5	FUJ; DSQ	MIN; Ret	SUZ; 1	SUZ; Ret	FUJ; 10	SUZ; 7	SUZ; 8				8th	36
1984	Team Le Mans	SUZ; 3	FUJ; Ret	MIN; 9	SUZ; 3	SUZ; 15	FUJ; 8	SUZ; Ret	SUZ; 4				5th	39
1985	Team Le Mans	**SUZ**; 1	FUJ; 6	MIN; Ret	SUZ; 3	SUZ; 9	FUJ; 6	SUZ; 5	SUZ; 2				**2nd**	**67 (69)**
1986	Team Le Mans	SUZ; 1	FUJ; 5	**MIN**; 1	SUZ; 5	SUZ; 5	FUJ; 5	SUZ; Ret	SUZ; Ret				4th	72
1987	Cabin Racing	SUZ; 13	FUJ; 3	MIN; 3	SUZ; 4	SUZ; 4	SUG; 3	FUJ; Ret	SUZ; 4	SUZ; 3			4th	78
1988	Meiju Racing	SUZ; 13	FUJ; 6	MIN; Ret	SUZ; Ret	SUG	FUJ; Ret	SUZ; 16	SUZ; Ret				12th	1
1989	Wacoal Dome Racing Team	SUZ; 14	FUJ; 6	MIN; 6	SUZ; Ret	SUG; Ret	FUJ; 6	SUZ; 6	SUZ; Ret				14th	4
1990	Dome	SUZ; 3	FUJ; Ret	**MIN**; 1	SUZ; 1	SUG; Ret	FUJ; 14	FUJ; Ret	SUZ; 7	FUJ; 13	SUZ; Ret		4th	22
1991	Dome	SUZ; Ret	AUT; Ret	FUJ; 2	MIN; Ret	SUZ; Ret	SUG; Ret	FUJ; 24	SUZ; 12	FUJ; C	SUZ; 18	FUJ; Ret	12th	6
1992	Dome	SUZ; 13	FUJ; Ret	MIN; Ret	SUZ; Ret	AUT; Ret	SUG; Ret	FUJ; 9	FUJ; Ret	SUZ; 9	FUJ; 14	SUZ; NC	25th	0

=== Complete 24 Hours of Le Mans results ===
Year	Team	Co-Drivers	Car	Class	Laps	Pos.	Class Pos.
1986	(Japan) Nissan Motorsport	(Japan) Kazuyoshi Hoshino (Japan) Aguri Suzuki	Nissan R86V	C1	64	DNF	DNF
1987	(Japan) Nissan Motorsport	(Japan) Kenji Takahashi (Japan) Kazuyoshi Hoshino	Nissan R87E	C1	181	DNF	DNF
