= FL500 =

- Category: Open-wheel racing
- Country: Japan
- Inaugural season: 1969
- Folded: 1991
- Engine manufacturers: Honda; Suzuki

FL500 was a category of Japanese formula motor racing series, in which the cars were built using kei car engines and other components. It was a junior formula racing series organized by the Japan Automobile Federation (JAF); one in which many future Japanese racing drivers got their start. The first "Mini Formula" car seen appeared in 1968 at the Minicar Trophy Race (Japanese: ミニカー・トロフィー・レース). The Mini Formula cars were raced mainly in local championships sanctioned by individual tracks, thus being variously known as MF, F-J, F500, FJ360, FL500, FL550, and FL-B - with FL or FL500 being the best known and most commonly used name.

== History ==
The first car featuring a kei-car engined formula racer was the August 1968 Minicar Trophy Race at Fuji. This race mainly concerned sports prototypes with enclosed wheels (the winning Mini 7 was such a design) as well as regular, tuned kei cars. The single car which partook in this race was joined by three more for the next Minicar race. This free-for-all continued until 1970, when FJ360 became officially recognized by the JAF. This was also when the first customer chassis became available, lowering the entry barriers for new contestants.

In 1973, the Japan Automobile Federation (JAF) launched the "All-Japan Formula 2000 Championship" as the top domestic open-wheeled racing category. As part of the effort to promote formula car racing in Japan, JAF also established the "All Japan FJ1300 Championship" and the "All Japan FJ360 Championship" as second tier categories, raced in conjunction with the major Formula 2000 races. The numbers indicate the maximum engine displacement while "FJ" was a reference to Formula Junior racing (the "J" also signifying "Japan"). The larger-engined category FJ1300 was a lower-cost series intended for newer racers, using off-the-shelf chassis manufactured by various constructors (including imported ones), limiting the scope for modifications by buyers. FJ360, meanwhile, used the 360 cc engines from kei cars, fitted into chassis built by established manufacturers but also in self-built ones. This led to much more engineering variety and experimentation in FJ360. Conversely, there was also less scope for using imported parts, which led to the smaller formula being nearly as expensive to compete in as FJ1300.

Lacking support from racers, FJ360 withered on the vine and was retired after two years. Only the "FL500" category remained, with an increased engine displacement of 500 cc, later becoming "FL550" when the kei car displacement limit was set to 550 cc. There was no official national championship, with the various racetracks organizing several races per year to stage their own championships.

"FJ360" signified "Formula Junior 360" ), indicating the series' junior status and . "FL" stands for "Formula Libre", meaning that constructors and designers largely had free hands in designing their cars, aside from certain safety regulations and engines sizes. The series continued to be contesteed throughout the 1980s, but with the Japanese Formula 3 Championship attracting most of the money and spectators attention was dwindling, with ever fewer races and competitors. 1991 was the last season for FL500; only Nakayama Circuit holding races. Today, however, there is renewed interest in the series and historic FL500 meetups have been held since the 2010s, allowing the cars to be driven at tracks such as Suzuka, Fuji, and Tsukuba.

== Design ==
This unique Japanese category emerged with the popularization of kei cars (mini cars). A typical, competition-ready FL500 car weighed in at just under 250 kg (551 lb). This was also the minimum weight when filled with fluids (excluding petrol); ballast was permitted in order to reach the minimum weight.

The engine used was initially a 360 cc unit from either Suzuki (two-stroke, three cylinders) or Honda (four-stroke, two cylinders). A two-stroke engine, however, produces significantly more power than a four-stroke engine of the same displacement. To make up for this difference, many Honda users bored out their engines to 500 cc. The Suzuki engines could not be bored out beyond 420 cc, which minimized some of the two-strokes' advantage. The organizers from the various race tracks started accepting 500 cc engines, and they became the norm even though JAF did not allow them to compete in the national championship. FJ360 never fully took off, however, and JAF stopped sanctioning races in 1972. The four-stroke Honda engine was an air-cooled, two-cylinder, while the two-stroke Suzuki engine was a water-cooled three-cylinder unit. The lighter and more powerful two-strokes dominated, with 18 out 20 starters at one 1977 race using Suzuki engines (the remaining two using four-stroke Hondas).

=== Chassis ===
The first "mass-produced" chassis was Hayashi Racing's 702A, presented in September 1970. This marked the beginning of genuine competition in FL500, as the starting fields were now fuller. Other popular brands included Bellco (built by Yokohama-based truck cabin manufacturers Suzuki Sheet Metal) and Nialco. Hayashi's designer started his own company, Konoike Speed (鴻池スピード, sometimes spelled "Kounoike"), who built cars called KS. Suzuki-engined KS07s dominated in 1977, taking the top three finishes at Suzuka in May, for instance. Bellco formed an offshoot called Bellco West (later simply West), while another designer started the Maxim project. Also of note is the Noda Racing cars (typically Honda engined). The most popular design remains the Hayashi 706. This design appeared in 1972 and, reflecting the move towards two-stroke engines, could be fitted with either the Honda or the Suzuki engine. 36 examples were built in the Hayashi Racing workshops.

== Competitors ==
Many Japanese motorsport figures began their careers as FL500 racers, including Formula One-driver Satoru Nakajima, as well as many other later stars. Others, such as the engineer Osamu Goto and designer Takuya Yura also started in FL500. In this way, FL500 worked as intended in broadening the base of Japanese motorsport in this era. The series mainly attracted homegrown talent, but there were at least two foreign-born drivers: in the late 1970s, Nico Nicole from Germany and Frenchman D. Latour were regular participants.

Year	Suzuka FL Champion	Car
1975	Satoru Nakajima	Bellco West・759
1976		
1977	Osamu Hatakawa	Hayashi・711B
1978	Takeshi Iida	Falcon・77A
1979	Tsuneyoshi Nakano	Hayashi・712
1980	Sakae Obata	Falcon・80A
1981	Yasuo Shinoda	Falcon・80A
