= Takao Wada =

Japanese racing driver

- Nationality: Japan
- Born: 24 June 1953 (age 73) Tokyo, Japan

All Japan Grand Touring Car Championship career
- Debut season: 1994
- Former teams: JLOC, Endless Sports
- Starts: 28
- Wins: 0
- Poles: 0
- Fastest laps: 0
- Best finish: 21st in 1994

Previous series
- 1994-99 1987-90 1983-92 1979-93 1979 1978: JGTC; JTCC; JSPC; All-Japan F2/F3000; Japanese Formula 3 FJ1300

Takao Wada (born 24 June 1953) is a Japanese former racing driver. He competed at the top level of Japanese Open Wheel racing between 1977 and 1993, scoring two wins, one pole position and five podium finishes over a career that spanned 14 seasons and 90 races, but he was better known for winning the 1979 Japanese Formula Pacific Championship and the 1986 Japanese Touring Car Championship.

== Motorsport career ==
Wada started racing in local touring car races in 1972, driving a privately owned Nissan. Five years later, he reached the highest level of Japanese Open Wheel racing at the end of the 1977 season, the last under the Formula 2000 regulations before adopting a Formula 2 format. At the same time, the Japanese Formula Pacific Championship was created after a one-year delay, accordingly to the changes instituted in the Macau Grand Prix back in 1974, with similar regulations to the F2 cars, but with a higher level of involvement from Japanese auto makers. Wada, by now under contract with Nissan and with support from Yokohama Rubber, was one of the early stars of the championship, finishing runner-up in 1978 behind Masahiro Hasemi before winning the title in 1979 at the wheel of a brand new March 79B.

That year, Wada finished sixth in the Japanese F2 series on his first full-time season, but he was involved in a serious crash at the final race at Suzuka, shortly after winning the Pacific title on the same weekend. Running two places behind him, the car driven by guest driver Beppe Gabbiani collided with Masahiro Hasemi approaching the Hairpin corner, overturned and went directly into Wada's path, who was then struck in the helmet by the left rear tyre of Gabbiani, still attached to the car. Wada lost consciousness and entered into cardiopulmonary arrest, being removed carelessly on a stretcher with his head unsecured before being revived at the medical centre. He suffered a concussion and spent three months in a hospital before making a full recovery.

The following years were less successful, although he finished third in the Macau Grand Prix in 1982 behind winner Roberto Moreno and Irish driver Alo Lawler. Afterwards, the change of regulations at Macau spelled the end of the Formula Pacific series in Japan, and Wada returned to the F2 championship, as well as starting his sportscar career in prototypes. His open-wheel career stalled in the following years, equalling his best ever result in 1988 when he finished sixth, tied with former champion Geoff Lees for fifth in the standings. That year, he scored his first win at Fuji over the series champion, and Nissan teammate, Aguri Suzuki, a feat only equalled that year twice by multiple champion Kazuyoshi Hoshino.

1986 was a landmark year for Wada with his increased role as a Nissan driver. He took part for the first time in the 24 Hours of Le Mans, where he became the first Japanese driver to ever complete the race, which would be followed by four straight retirements in the following years. He also had a successful first foray into the newborn Japanese Touring Car Championship, winning the title along Aguri Suzuki at the wheel of a Nissan Skyline. Despite that, he would not defend his crown, reappearing only in 1990 as he concentrated on his open-wheel and prototype efforts.

Wada's second and final Japanese F3000 win occurred in 1989, at Sportsland SUGO. From 10th on the grid, Wada took the lead over Ross Cheever and pulled a 50-second lead as attrition took its toll. When trying to put Lees a lap down, Wada went off the track and spun onto the path of other cars. Hideki Okada failed to avoid him, as both rear left tires touched, suffering terminal damage. Wada was able to continue with a reasonable pace and a slightly bent suspension, which gradually damaged the brake hose. Heading to Turn 1 on the final lap, the brakes failed and Wada went briefly off-track, breaking the upper rocker arm in the process. The car kept running at a much reduced pace, as half of the tyre surface was up in the air on the turns. Akihiko Nakaya approached quickly, but ran out of time, and Wada won the race by 0.32 seconds, despite thinking he still had one more lap left.

Wada escaped a fatal fate for the second time in 1991, during an All-Japan Sports Prototype Championship race at Fuji. A tyre blew in his Nissan R91VP at the end of the long straight, sending the car into a series of somersaults in the gravel trap. The car erupted in flames and was upside down as it stopped rolling, but Wada was able to sprint out of the machine uninjured before fellow driver Johnny Herbert could get to him, having stopped his own car to help him.

Wada last raced in open-wheel racing in the 1993 season, being one of only nine drivers who has competed in 14 or more seasons in Super Formula and its predecessors. With the demise of the All Japan Sports-Prototype Championship, Wada turned to the JGTC (All-Japan GT Championship), racing for the Japan Lamborghini Owner's Club with modest results for five years before being reunited with a Nissan Skyline GT-R, on which he hanged up the helmet after 1999.

Off the track, Wada was known for his casual attire, combining a 'punch perm' hairstyle (mostly associated with low income workers, motorcycle gangs and outlaws such as the yakuza) with American-style sunglasses. After his retirement, he set up a driving school for young drivers aiming to compete in the lower divisions of Japanese racing.

== Motorsports results ==
=== Japanese Top Formula Championship results ===
(key) (Races in bold indicate pole position) (Races in italics indicate fastest lap)

| Year | Entrant | 1 | 2 | 3 | 4 | 5 | 6 | 7 | 8 | 9 | 10 | 11 | DC | Points |
|---|---|---|---|---|---|---|---|---|---|---|---|---|---|---|
| 1977 | Tomei Jidousya | SUZ | SUZ | MIN | SUZ | FUJ | FUJ | SUZ | SUZ; 10 | | | | 18th | 3 |
| 1978 | Tomei Jidousya | SUZ | FUJ | SUZ | SUZ | SUZ; Ret | MIN | SUZ | | | | | NC | 0 |
| 1979 | Harada Racing Company | SUZ; 7 | MIN; 7 | SUZ; Ret | FUJ; 3 | SUZ; 3 | SUZ; Ret | SUZ; Ret | | | | | 6th | 30 |
| 1983 | Mimasu Racing | SUZ; 11 | FUJ; Ret | MIN | SUZ; 10 | SUZ; Ret | FUJ; 6 | SUZ; Ret | SUZ; 9 | | | | 13th | 9 |
| 1984 | OM Racing | SUZ; 7 | FUJ; Ret | MIN | SUZ; 14 | SUZ; 7 | FUJ; 11 | SUZ; 11 | SUZ; 12 | | | | 17th | 8 |
| 1985 | Advan Sports Tomei | SUZ; 7 | FUJ; 8 | MIN | SUZ; Ret | SUZ; Ret | FUJ; 4 | SUZ; 10 | SUZ; Ret | | | | 12th | 18 |
| 1986 | Advan Sports Shigeyama Racing | SUZ; 3 | FUJ; 4 | MIN; 9 | SUZ; 6 | SUZ; 12 | FUJ; 9 | SUZ; 11 | SUZ; 11 | | | | 8th | 32 |
| 1987 | Advan Sports Shigeyama Racing | SUZ; 14 | FUJ; 8 | MIN; 10 | SUZ; 7 | SUZ; DSQ | SUG; 7 | FUJ; 9 | SUZ; 11 | SUZ; Ret | | | 13th | 14 |
| 1988 | Advan Sport Pal | SUZ; 5 | FUJ; 7 | MIN; Ret | SUZ; Ret | SUG; 4 | FUJ; 1 | SUZ; 6 | SUZ; 10 | | | | 6th | 15 |
| 1989 | Advan Sport Pal | SUZ; Ret | **FUJ**; Ret | MIN; Ret | SUZ; 10 | SUG; 1 | FUJ; 16 | SUZ; 16 | SUZ; Ret | | | | 7th | 9 |
| 1990 | Advan Sport Pal | SUZ; Ret | FUJ; 4 | MIN; Ret | SUZ; 14 | SUG; 22 | FUJ; 7 | FUJ; Ret | SUZ; Ret | FUJ; Ret | SUZ; 4 | | 11th | 6 |
| 1991 | Advan Sport Pal | SUZ; 17 | AUT; DNS | FUJ; 7 | MIN; Ret | SUZ; DNQ | SUG | FUJ; DNQ | SUZ | FUJ; C | SUZ | FUJ | 26th | 0 |
| 1992 | Nisseki Racing Team | SUZ; DNQ | FUJ; 14 | MIN; 10 | SUZ; 12 | AUT; 8 | SUG; 13 | FUJ; 6 | FUJ; 16 | SUZ; DNS | FUJ; 10 | SUZ; Ret | 18th | 1 |
| 1993 | Super Evolution Racing Team | SUZ; 15 | FUJ; 12 | MIN; 8 | SUZ; 14 | AUT; C | SUG; 12 | FUJ; C | FUJ | SUZ | FUJ | SUZ | 19th | 0 |

=== Complete JGTC results ===
| Year | Team | Car | Class | 1 | 2 | 3 | 4 | 5 | 6 | 7 | DC | Pts |
|---|---|---|---|---|---|---|---|---|---|---|---|---|
| 1994 | KEN WOLF with Terai Engineering | Lamborghini Countach | GT1 | FUJ; Ret | SEN; 8 | FUJ; Ret | SUG; 11 | MIN; Ret | | | 21st | 3 |
| 1995 | KEN WOLF with Terai Engineering | Lamborghini Diablo Jota | GT1 | SUZ; 15 | FUJ | SEN; 13 | FUJ; 13 | SUG; Ret | MIN; Ret | | NC | 0 |
| 1996 | KEN WOLF with JLOC Corsa | Lamborghini Diablo Jota | GT500 | SUZ; Ret | FUJ; Ret | SEN | FUJ; 11 | SUG; Ret | MIN; 14 | | NC | 0 |
| 1997 | JLOC Corsa | Lamborghini Diablo GT-1 | GT500 | SUZ | FUJ; Ret | SEN; Ret | FUJ; 14 | MIN; Ret | SUG; 13 | | NC | 0 |
| 1998 | JLOC Corsa | Lamborghini Diablo Jota | GT500 | SUZ; 15 | FUJ; C | SEN | FUJ; 17 | TRM; Ret | MIN; DNA | SUG; Ret | NC | 0 |
| 1999 | Endless Sports | Nissan Skyline GT-R | GT500 | SUZ; 12 | FUJ; 10 | SUG; 10 | MIN | FUJ; 16 | TAI | TRM | 26th | 2 |

=== 24 Hours of Le Mans results ===
| Year | Team | Co-Drivers | Car | Class | Laps | Pos. | Class Pos. |
|---|---|---|---|---|---|---|---|
| 1986 | (Japan) Nismo | (United Kingdom) James Weaver (Japan) Masahiro Hasemi | Nissan R85V | C1 | 285 | 16th | 10th |
| 1987 | (Japan) Nismo | (Japan) Masahiro Hasemi (Japan) Aguri Suzuki | Nissan R87E | C1 | 117 | DNF | DNF |
| 1988 | (Japan) Nismo | (Japan) Kazuyoshi Hoshino (Japan) Aguri Suzuki | Nissan R88C | C1 | 286 | DNF | DNF |
| 1989 | (Japan) Team Le Mans Co. (France) Courage Compétition | (Japan) Akio Morimoto (Sweden) Anders Olofsson | March 88S−Nissan | C1 | 221 | DNF | DNF |
| 1990 | (Japan) Team LeMans | (Sweden) Anders Olofsson (Brazil) Maurizio Sandro Sala | Nissan R89C | C1 | 182 | DNF | DNF |
