= Hideki Okada =

Japanese racing driver

Hideki Okada (born 28 November 1958) is a Japanese former racing driver.

== Japanese Formula 3000 Championship/Formula Nippon results ==
(key) (Races in bold indicate pole position) (Races in italics indicate fastest lap)

Year	Team	1	2	3	4	5	6	7	8	9	10	11	DC	Pts
1988	Marlboro Team Nova	SUZ; Ret	FUJ; 4	MIN; 5	SUZ; 6	SUG; 7	FUJ; 5	SUZ; Ret	SUZ; 5				8th	10
1989	Leyton House Racing Team	SUZ; Ret	FUJ; Ret	MIN; Ret	SUZ; 5	SUG; Ret	FUJ; 3	SUZ; Ret	SUZ; 5				9th	8
1990	Motor Sport Development	SUZ; Ret	FUJ; Ret	MIN; 12	SUZ; 7	SUG; DNQ	FUJ; Ret	FUJ; 13	SUZ; 17	FUJ; 6	SUZ; Ret		20th	1
1991	Ad Racing Team	SUZ; DNQ	AUT	FUJ	MIN	SUZ	SUG	FUJ	SUZ	FUJ	SUZ	FUJ	NC	0
1995	Team Gullwing	SUZ	FUJ	MIN; Ret	SUZ; 9	SUG; Ret	FUJ; 14	TOK	FUJ; 10	SUZ; Ret			NC	0
1996	Art Brilliant Gullwing	SUZ; 11	MIN; Ret	FUJ; 17	TOK; 10	SUZ; 10	SUG; Ret	FUJ; 11	MIN; 10	SUZ; Ret	FUJ; DNS		NC	0

== Japanese Touring Car Championship (-1993) Class results ==
Year	Team	Car	Class	1	2	3	4	5	6	7	8	9	DC	Pts
1985	?	Toyota Corolla Levin	DIV.1	SUG	TSU	NIS	SUZ	FUJ; 5					?	?
1986	？	Toyota Corolla FX	DIV.1	NIS; 3	SUG; 5	TSU; 14	SEN; 5	FUJ; 1	SUZ; 1				?	?
1987	?	Honda Civic	DIV.1	NIS; 1	SEN; 1	TSU; 1	SUG; 1	FUJ; 1	SUZ; 1				**1st**	**120**
1988	?	Honda Civic	JTC-3	SUZ; 1	NIS; 2	SEN; 1	TSU; 6	SUG; 2	FUJ; 2				**1st**	?
1989	Nakajima Racing	Honda Civic	JTC-3	NIS; Ret	SEN; 3	TSU; 1	SUG; 5	SUZ; 2	FUJ; DNQ				?	?
1990	Mugen Motorsports	Honda Civic	JTC-3	NIS; 5	SUG; 2	SUZ; 1	TSU; 4	SEN; 1	FUJ; 4				**3rd**	**78**
1991	Mugen Motorsports	Honda Civic	JTC-3	SUG; Ret	SUZ; 1	TSU; 4	SEN; 2	AUT; Ret	FUJ; 1				**1st**	**74**
1992	Mugen Motorsports	Honda Civic	JTC-3	TAI; 1	AUT; 3	SUG; 1	SUZ; Ret	MIN; Ret	TSU; 1	SEN; 7	FUJ; 1		**1st**	**93**
1993	Mugen Motorsports	Honda Civic	JTC-3	MIN; 1	AUT; 3	SUG; 1	SUZ; 7	TAI; 2	TSU; 6	TOK; 1	SEN; 4	FUJ; 8	4th	110

== Japanese Touring Car Championship (1994-) results ==
Year	Team	Car	1	2	3	4	5	6	7	8	9	10	11	12	13	14	15	16	DC	Pts
1995	5ZIGEN	Honda Civic Ferio	FUJ; 1	FUJ; 2	SUG; 1 Ret	SUG; 2 DNS	TOK; 1; 18	TOK; 2; 15	SUZ; 1 Ret	SUZ; 2; 10	MIN; 1; 25	MIN; 2; 10	AID; 1; 26	AID; 2; 12	SEN; 1 Ret	SEN; 2; 20	FUJ; 1 Ret	FUJ; 2; 18	26th	2
1997	Dome	Honda Accord	FUJ; 1 C	FUJ; 2 C	AID; 1; 12	AID; 2 DNS	SUG; 1 Ret	SUG; 2; 4	SUZ; 1; 8	SUZ; 2 Ret	MIN; 1 Ret	MIN; 2; 5	SEN; 1; 9	SEN; 2 Ret	TOK; 1; 11	TOK; 2; 9	FUJ; 1; 7	FUJ; 2; 5	12th	30
