= March 832 =

- Category: Formula 2
- Constructor: March
- Designer(s): Ralph Bellamy

Technical specifications
- Chassis: Aluminum/carbon-fiber monocoque with rear sub-frame covered in fiberglass body
- Suspension (front): Double wishbones, Coil springs over Dampers, Anti-roll bar
- Suspension (rear): Twin lower links, Single top links, twin trailing arms, Coil springs over Dampers, Anti-roll bar
- Axle track: 1,499 mm (59.0 in) (front); 1,499 mm (59.0 in) (rear)
- Wheelbase: 2,540 mm (100 in)
- Engine: BMW M12/7B, mid-engined, longitudinally mounted, 2.0 L (122.0 cu in), I4, NA
- Transmission: Hewland F.T.200 5-speed manual
- Power: 320 hp (240 kW); 251 N⋅m (185 lb⋅ft)
- Weight: 517 kg (1,140 lb)
- Brakes: AP Racing brake discs
- Tyres: Michelin; 23/55-13: 10 x 13 (front); 32/61-13: 14 x 13(rear)

Competition history
- Debut: 1983

The March 832 was a British open-wheel Formula 2 racing car, built by March Engineering in 1983. The car's best result in Formula 2 racing was third in the 1983 championship season with Beppe Gabbiani scoring 4 wins with Onyx Racing. After finding moderate success in open-wheel racing, the car was converted to a closed-wheel sports prototype for the revived Can-Am series, it and competed in 1984. It was powered by the 2-liter BMW M12/7B engine. Kim Campbell won the 2-liter Can-Am Championship that season, not scoring any wins, but scoring four podiums, which was enough to clinch the championship.
