= March 842 =

- Category: Formula 2
- Constructor: March
- Designer(s): Ralph Bellamy

Technical specifications
- Chassis: Aluminum/carbon-fiber monocoque with rear sub-frame covered in fiberglass body
- Suspension (front): Double wishbones, Coil springs over Dampers, Anti-roll bar
- Suspension (rear): Twin lower links, Single top links, twin trailing arms, Coil springs over Dampers, Anti-roll bar
- Axle track: 1,499 mm (59.0 in) (front); 1,499 mm (59.0 in) (rear)
- Wheelbase: 2,540 mm (100 in)
- Engine: BMW M12/7B, mid-engined, longitudinally mounted, 2.0 L (122.0 cu in), I4, NA
- Transmission: Hewland F.T.200 5-speed manual
- Power: 320 hp (240 kW); 251 N⋅m (185 lb⋅ft)
- Weight: 517 kg (1,140 lb)
- Brakes: AP Racing brake discs
- Tyres: Michelin; 23/55-13: 10 x 13 (front); 32/61-13: 14 x 13(rear)

Competition history
- Debut: 1984

The March 842 is an open-wheel formula racing car, design, developed and built by March Engineering, for Formula 2 racing, in 1984. It was powered by a 2.0 L (120 cu in) BMW M12/7 four-cylinder engine, producing over 300 hp (220 kW). It contested in the 1984 European Formula Two Championship, where its best result was a win at Hockenheim, being driven by Pascal Fabre, followed by a 2nd-place finish later in the season, at Donington Park, being driven by Emanuele Pirro. Its best result in the championship that year was a 5th-place finish, for German driver Christian Danner that year.
