= Noritake Takahara =

Japanese racing driver (born 1951)

- Born: 6 June 1951 (age 75); Tokyo, Japan

Formula One World Championship career
- Nationality: (Japan) Japanese
- Active years: 1976-1977
- Team(s): Surtees, Kojima
- Entries: 2
- Championships: 0
- Wins: 0
- Podiums: 0
- Career points: 0
- Pole positions: 0
- Fastest laps: 0
- First entry: 1976 Japanese Grand Prix
- Last entry: 1977 Japanese Grand Prix

Noritake Takahara (高原 敬武; born 6 June 1951) is a former racing driver from Japan. He participated in two Formula One World Championship Grands Prix, debuting on 24 October 1976. He scored no championship points. Along with his compatriots Masahiro Hasemi and Kazuyoshi Hoshino, he was the first Japanese driver to start a Formula One Grand Prix.

Takahara is a two-time Japanese Formula 2000 champion, winning the title in 1974 and 1976, and resulting vice-champion in 1975 and third in 1973.

Takahara won the Fuji Grand Champion Series three times in 1973, 1975 and 1976, and resulted vice-champion in 1974. He collected 17 wins and 30 podiums in that championship.

== Racing record ==
=== Japanese Top Formula Championship results ===
(key)

Year	Entrant	1	2	3	4	5	6	7	8	DC	Points
1973	Noritake Takahara	FUJ; Ret	SUZ; 1	SUZ; 1	SUZ; 2					3rd	34
1974	Takahara Racing Ltd	SUZ; 3	SUZ; 2	SUZ; 1	SUZ; 1					1st	45
1975	Takahara Racing Ltd	FUJ; 2	SUZ	FUJ; 2	SUZ; 1	SUZ; 3				2nd	59
1976	Takahara Racing Ltd	FUJ; 1	SUZ; 1	FUJ; 3	SUZ; 7	SUZ; 3				1st	66
1977	Takahara Racing Ltd	SUZ; Ret	SUZ; Ret	MIN	SUZ; 4	FUJ; 4	FUJ; 5	SUZ; 5	SUZ; 8	6th	40
1978	Harada Racing Company	SUZ; 6	FUJ; 9	SUZ; Ret	SUZ	SUZ; 6	MIN	SUZ		8th	22
1979	Team IKUZAWA	SUZ; 4	MIN	SUZ; 13	FUJ; Ret	SUZ; 7	SUZ; 3	SUZ; Ret		8th	28

=== Complete Formula One World Championship results ===
(key)

Year	Entrant	Chassis	Engine	1	2	3	4	5	6	7	8	9	10	11	12	13	14	15	16	17	WDC	Points
1976	Team Surtees	Surtees TS19	Cosworth V8	BRA	RSA	USW	ESP	BEL	MON	SWE	FRA	GBR	GER	AUT	NED	ITA	CAN	USA	JPN; 9		NC	0
1977	Kojima Engineering	Kojima KE009	Cosworth V8	ARG	BRA	RSA	USW	ESP	MON	BEL	SWE	FRA	GBR	GER	AUT	NED	ITA	USA	CAN	JPN; Ret	NC	0

Sporting positions
Preceded by Motoharu Kurosawa	Japanese Formula 2000; Champion; 1974	Succeeded by Kazuyoshi Hoshino
Preceded by Kazuyoshi Hoshino	Japanese Formula 2000; Champion; 1976	Succeeded by Kazuyoshi Hoshino
