= 1985 All Japan Endurance Championship =

Seasons
- ← 1984 1986 →

The 1985 All Japan Endurance Championship was the third season of the All Japan Sports Prototype Championship. The 1985 champion was the #25 Advan Sports Nova Porsche 962C driven by Kunimitsu Takahashi.

== Entry list ==
=== D/C/LD-1/LD-2 ===
- For the WEC-Japan event, JSPC teams used different car numbers to avoid conflicts with the car numbers of the entrants of the World Sportscar Championship; each car's WEC-Japan race number is displayed in tooltips.

Team	Make	Car	Engine	No.	Drivers	Tyre	Rounds
Trust Racing Team	Porsche	Porsche 956B	Porsche 935/79 2.6 L Twin Turbo F6	1	(Australia) Vern Schuppan	D	All
Trust Racing Team	Porsche	Porsche 956B	Porsche 935/79 2.6 L Twin Turbo F6	1	(Japan) Keiichi Suzuki	D	All
Trust Racing Team	Porsche	Porsche 956B	Porsche 935/79 2.6 L Twin Turbo F6	1	(South Africa) George Fouché	D	5
Alpha Cubic Racing Team	MCS	MCS Guppy	BMW M12/7 2.0 L I4	2	(Japan) Noritake Takahara	B	1–2
Alpha Cubic Racing Team	MCS	MCS Guppy	BMW M12/7 2.0 L I4	2	(Japan) Chiyomi Totani	B	1–2
Alpha Cubic Racing Team	Porsche	Porsche 956B	Porsche 935/79 2.6 L Twin Turbo F6	2	(Japan) Noritake Takahara	B	3–6
Alpha Cubic Racing Team	Porsche	Porsche 956B	Porsche 935/79 2.6 L Twin Turbo F6	2	(Japan) Chiyomi Totani	B	3–6
Alpha Cubic Racing Team	Porsche	Porsche 956B	Porsche 935/79 2.6 L Twin Turbo F6	2	(Japan) Keiichi Suzuki	B	3–4, 6
Auto Beaurex Motorsport (Note: 1. 84 competed as #62 from Rd. 1–4)	Toyota	TOM'S 85C	Toyota 4T-GT 2.1 L Turbo I4	3	(Japan) Naoki Nagasaka	D	2–6
Auto Beaurex Motorsport	Toyota	TOM'S 85C	Toyota 4T-GT 2.1 L Turbo I4	3	(Japan) Taku Akaike	D	2–6
Auto Beaurex Motorsport	Lotec	Lotec M1C	BMW M88 3.5 L I6	84	(Japan) Kazuo Mogi	Y	All
Auto Beaurex Motorsport	Lotec	Lotec M1C	BMW M88 3.5 L I6	84	(Japan) Toshio Motohashi	Y	All
Garage Italya	Lancia	Lancia LC2/84	Lancia 268C 2.6 L Twin Turbo V8	6	(Italy) Alessandro Nannini	D	2–3
Garage Italya	Lancia	Lancia LC2/84	Lancia 268C 2.6 L Twin Turbo V8	6	(France) Henri Pescarolo	D	2, 4–5
Garage Italya	Lancia	Lancia LC2/84	Lancia 268C 2.6 L Twin Turbo V8	6	(Italy) Lucio Cesario	D	3, 5
Rays Racing Division	Toyota	TOM'S 85C	Toyota 4T-GT 2.1 L Turbo I4	8	(Japan) Hitoshi Ogawa	D	2–6
Rays Racing Division	Toyota	TOM'S 85C	Toyota 4T-GT 2.1 L Turbo I4	8	(Japan) Tsunehisa Asai	D	2–6
Hasemi Motorsport	Nissan	Nissan Skyline Turbo C	Nissan LZ20B 2.1 L Turbo I4	11	(Japan) Masahiro Hasemi	D	1–2
Hasemi Motorsport	Nissan	Nissan Skyline Turbo C	Nissan LZ20B 2.1 L Turbo I4	11	(Japan) Takao Wada	D	1–2
Hasemi Motorsport	Nissan	Nissan R85V	Nissan VG30T/C 3.0 L Twin Turbo V6	11	(Japan) Masahiro Hasemi	D	3–6
Hasemi Motorsport	Nissan	Nissan R85V	Nissan VG30T/C 3.0 L Twin Turbo V6	11	(Japan) Takao Wada	D	3–6
Panasport Japan (Note: Competed as #26 from Rd. 1–2)	LeMans	LeMans LM04C	Nissan LZ20B 2.1 L Turbo I4	12	(Japan) Keiji Matsumoto	B	1–2
Panasport Japan	LeMans	LeMans LM04C	Nissan LZ20B 2.1 L Turbo I4	12	(Japan) Osamu Nakako	B	1–2
Panasport Japan	LeMans	LeMans LM05C	Nissan FJ23T 2.3 L Turbo I4	12	(Japan) Osamu Nakako	B	3–6
Panasport Japan	LeMans	LeMans LM05C	Nissan FJ23T 2.3 L Turbo I4	12	(Japan) Akio Morimoto	B	3–6
Panasport Japan	LeMans	LeMans LM05C	Nissan FJ23T 2.3 L Turbo I4	12	(Italy) Emanuele Pirro	B	5
Central 20 Racing Team	LeMans	LeMans LM04C	Nissan LZ20B 2.1 L Turbo I4	20	(Japan) Haruhito Yanagida	D	1–2
Central 20 Racing Team	LeMans	LeMans LM04C	Nissan LZ20B 2.1 L Turbo I4	20	(Japan) Takamasa Nakagawa	D	1–2
Central 20 Racing Team	Lola	Lola T810	Nissan VG30ET 3.0 L Twin Turbo V6	20	(Japan) Haruhito Yanagida	D	3–6
Central 20 Racing Team	Lola	Lola T810	Nissan VG30ET 3.0 L Twin Turbo V6	20	(Japan) Takamasa Nakagawa	D	3–6
Hoshino Racing	Nissan	Nissan Silvia Turbo C	Nissan LZ20B 2.1 L Turbo I4	23	(Japan) Kazuyoshi Hoshino	B	1–2
Hoshino Racing	Nissan	Nissan Silvia Turbo C	Nissan LZ20B 2.1 L Turbo I4	23	(Japan) Akira Hagiwara	B	1–2
Hoshino Racing	Nissan	Nissan R85V	Nissan VG30T/C 3.0 L Twin Turbo V6	23	(Japan) Kazuyoshi Hoshino	B	3–6
Hoshino Racing	Nissan	Nissan R85V	Nissan VG30T/C 3.0 L Twin Turbo V6	23	(Japan) Keiji Matsumoto	B	3–6
Hoshino Racing	Nissan	Nissan R85V	Nissan VG30T/C 3.0 L Twin Turbo V6	23	(Japan) Akira Hagiwara	B	3–6
ADVAN Sports Nova	Porsche	Porsche 962C	Porsche 935/82 3.0 L Twin Turbo F6	25	(Japan) Kunimitsu Takahashi	Y	All
ADVAN Sports Nova	Porsche	Porsche 962C	Porsche 935/82 3.0 L Twin Turbo F6	25	(Japan) Kenji Takahashi	Y	All
From A Racing	Porsche	Porsche 956B	Porsche 935/79 2.6 L Twin Turbo F6	27	(Japan) Jiro Yoneyama	D	All
From A Racing	Porsche	Porsche 956B	Porsche 935/79 2.6 L Twin Turbo F6	27	(Japan) Hideki Okada	D	All
Misaki Speed	Toyota	TOM'S 85C	Toyota 4T-GT 2.1 L Turbo I4	35	(Japan) Kiyoshi Misaki	B	5
Misaki Speed	Toyota	TOM'S 85C	Toyota 4T-GT 2.1 L Turbo I4	35	(Japan) Toshio Suzuki	B	5
Misaki Speed	Toyota	TOM'S 85C	Toyota 4T-GT 2.1 L Turbo I4	35	(Japan) Kaoru Hoshino	B	5
TOM'S	Toyota	TOM'S 85C	Toyota 4T-GT 2.1 L Turbo I4	36	(Japan) Satoru Nakajima	B	All
TOM'S	Toyota	TOM'S 85C	Toyota 4T-GT 2.1 L Turbo I4	36	(Japan) Masanori Sekiya	B	All
TOM'S	Toyota	TOM'S 85C	Toyota 4T-GT 2.1 L Turbo I4	36	(Japan) Kaoru Hoshino	B	2–6
Team Ikuzawa	Toyota	TOM'S 85C	Toyota 4T-GT 2.1 L Turbo I4	37	(United Kingdom) Tiff Needell	D	2–6
Team Ikuzawa	Toyota	TOM'S 85C	Toyota 4T-GT 2.1 L Turbo I4	37	(United Kingdom) James Weaver	D	2–6
Dome Motorsport	Toyota	TOM'S 84C	Toyota 4T-GT 2.1 L Turbo I4	38	(Sweden) Eje Elgh	D	1
Dome Motorsport	Toyota	TOM'S 84C	Toyota 4T-GT 2.1 L Turbo I4	38	(United Kingdom) Geoff Lees	D	1
Dome Motorsport	Toyota	TOM'S 85C	Toyota 4T-GT 2.1 L Turbo I4	38	(United Kingdom) Geoff Lees	D	2–6
Dome Motorsport	Toyota	TOM'S 85C	Toyota 4T-GT 2.1 L Turbo I4	38	(Japan) Toshio Suzuki	D	2
Dome Motorsport	Toyota	TOM'S 85C	Toyota 4T-GT 2.1 L Turbo I4	38	(Sweden) Eje Elgh	D	3–6
Mazdaspeed	Mazda	Mazda 737C	Mazda RE13B 1.3 L 2-rotor	85	(Japan) Yoshimi Katayama	D	3–6
Mazdaspeed	Mazda	Mazda 737C	Mazda RE13B 1.3 L 2-rotor	85	(Japan) Takashi Yorino	D	3–6
Mazdaspeed	Mazda	Mazda 737C	Mazda RE13B 1.3 L 2-rotor	86	(Japan) Yojiro Terada	D	All
Mazdaspeed	Mazda	Mazda 737C	Mazda RE13B 1.3 L 2-rotor	86	(Japan) Yoshimi Katayama	D	1–2
Mazdaspeed	Mazda	Mazda 737C	Mazda RE13B 1.3 L 2-rotor	86	(Japan) Takashi Yorino	D	2
Mazdaspeed	Mazda	Mazda 737C	Mazda RE13B 1.3 L 2-rotor	86	(Republic of Ireland) David Kennedy	D	3–6
Top Fuel Racing	Mazda	Mazda RX-7 845	Mazda RE13B 1.3 L 2-rotor	88	(Japan) Norimasa Sakamoto	B	1–4
Top Fuel Racing	Mazda	Mazda RX-7 845	Mazda RE13B 1.3 L 2-rotor	88	(Japan) Takayuki Imazu	B	1
Top Fuel Racing	Mazda	Mazda RX-7 845	Mazda RE13B 1.3 L 2-rotor	88	(Japan) Hironobu Tatsumi	B	2–4
Mr S Racing Product	MCS	MCS Guppy	BMW M12/7 2.0 L I4	96	(Japan) Shuji Fujii	D	5
Mr S Racing Product	MCS	MCS Guppy	BMW M12/7 2.0 L I4	96	(Japan) Seiichi Sodeyama	D	5
Mr S Racing Product	MCS	MCS Guppy	BMW M12/7 2.0 L I4	96	(Japan) Toru Sawada	D	5

=== B ===
Team	Make	Car	Engine	No.	Drivers	Tyre	Rounds
Meiwa MSC	Honda	Honda Civic	Honda EN1 1.3 L I4	5	(Japan) Masami Fujita	B	1
Meiwa MSC	Honda	Honda Civic	Honda EN1 1.3 L I4	5	(Japan) Ken Mizokawa	B	1
Toru Hirano	West	West 85S	Mazda RE13B 1.3 L 2-rotor	5	(Japan) Toru Hirano	B	4
Toru Hirano	West	West 85S	Mazda RE13B 1.3 L 2-rotor	5	(Japan) Genshoku Nakagawa	B	4
Toru Hirano	West	West 85S	Mazda RE13B 1.3 L 2-rotor	5	(Japan) Akihiro Matsuda	B	4
Toru Hirano	West	West 83S-II	Mazda RE13B 1.3 L 2-rotor	55	(Japan) Toru Hirano	B	1
Toru Hirano	West	West 83S-II	Mazda RE13B 1.3 L 2-rotor	55	(Japan) Hirofumi Nishi	B	1
Shinryo Auto	West	West 83S-II	Mazda RE13B 1.3 L 2-rotor	6	(Japan) Akihiro Masuda	D	1
Seabreeze	Manatee	Manatee Mk.IV	Mazda RE13B 1.3 L 2-rotor	7	(Japan) Hajime Oshiro	D	4
Seabreeze	Manatee	Manatee Mk.IV	Mazda RE13B 1.3 L 2-rotor	7	(Japan) Hideshi Matsuda	D	4
Seabreeze	Manatee	Manatee Mk.IV	Mazda RE13B 1.3 L 2-rotor	7	(Japan) Eiji Yamada	D	4
Auto Kamida	West	West 85S	Mazda RE13B 1.3 L 2-rotor	8	(Japan) Masaharu Kinoshita	D	1
Auto Kamida	West	West 83S-II	Mazda RE13B 1.3 L 2-rotor	9	(Japan) Shuji Fujii	D	1
Auto Kamida	West	West 85S	Mazda RE13B 1.3 L 2-rotor	17	(Japan) Masako Fujiwara	D	4
Auto Kamida	West	West 85S	Mazda RE13B 1.3 L 2-rotor	17	(Japan) Michiko Okuyama	D	4
Auto Kamida	West	West 85S	Mazda RE13B 1.3 L 2-rotor	17	(Japan) Hideki Ogawa	D	4
Ishida Racing	West	West 83S-II	Mazda RE13B 1.3 L 2-rotor	10	(Japan) Nobuyuki Saka	B	1
Ishida Racing	West	West 83S-II	Mazda RE13B 1.3 L 2-rotor	10	(Japan) Nobuo Naka	B	1
Ishida Racing	West	West 85S	Mazda RE13B 1.3 L 2-rotor	14	(Japan) Nobuyuki Saka	B	4
Ishida Racing	West	West 85S	Mazda RE13B 1.3 L 2-rotor	14	(Japan) Nobuo Naka	B	4
Auto European	West	West 83S-II	Mazda RE13B 1.3 L 2-rotor	13	(Japan) Katsunori Iketani	B	4
Auto European	West	West 83S-II	Mazda RE13B 1.3 L 2-rotor	13	(Japan) Hideo Hosoya	B	4
Auto European	West	West 83S-II	Mazda RE13B 1.3 L 2-rotor	13	(Japan) Ryuji Nakajima	B	4
Capris Enterprise	Mazda	Mazda RX-7 253	Mazda RE13B 1.3 L 2-rotor	15	(Japan) Kazuyoshi Sakamoto	B	4
Capris Enterprise	Mazda	Mazda RX-7 253	Mazda RE13B 1.3 L 2-rotor	15	(Japan) Hiroshi Noda	B	4
Capris Enterprise	Mazda	Mazda RX-7 253	Mazda RE13B 1.3 L 2-rotor	15	(Japan) Kenji Iya	B	4
Daiichi Hanbai	Manatee	Manatee Mk.IV	Mazda RE13B 1.3 L 2-rotor	16	(Japan) Ichiro Mizuno	B	1
Daiichi Hanbai	Manatee	Manatee Mk.IV	Mazda RE13B 1.3 L 2-rotor	16	(Japan) Taido Hashimoto	B	1
Daiichi Hanbai	Manatee	Manatee Mk.IV	Mazda RE13B 1.3 L 2-rotor	24	(Japan) Ichiro Mizuno	B	4
Daiichi Hanbai	Manatee	Manatee Mk.IV	Mazda RE13B 1.3 L 2-rotor	24	(Japan) Taido Hashimoto	B	4
Daiichi Hanbai	Manatee	Manatee Mk.IV	Mazda RE13B 1.3 L 2-rotor	24	(Japan) Yoshinori Sakurai	B	4
Tokico	Mazda	Mazda RX-7 254	Mazda RE13B 1.3 L 2-rotor	18	(Japan) Kazuhiko Oda	D	2–4
Tokico	Mazda	Mazda RX-7 254	Mazda RE13B 1.3 L 2-rotor	18	(Japan) Akira Watanabe	D	2–4
Tokico	Mazda	Mazda RX-7 254	Mazda RE13B 1.3 L 2-rotor	18	(Japan) Makoto Ohto	D	3
Samejima SS	West	West 85S	Mazda RE13B 1.3 L 2-rotor	19	(Japan) Takamasa Nakagawa	D	4
Samejima SS	West	West 85S	Mazda RE13B 1.3 L 2-rotor	19	(Japan) Shuji Hyodo	D	4
KanBS	Manatee	Manatee Mk.IV	Mazda RE13B 1.3 L 2-rotor	21	(Japan) Yukinobu Mizutani	D	1
KanBS	Manatee	Manatee Mk.IV	Mazda RE13B 1.3 L 2-rotor	21	(Japan) Yoshinori Sakurai	D	1
Target 1/Cosmos	Manatee	Manatee Mk.IV	Mazda RE13B 1.3 L 2-rotor	22	(Japan) Yukinobu Mizutani	D	4
Target 1/Cosmos	Manatee	Manatee Mk.IV	Mazda RE13B 1.3 L 2-rotor	22	(Japan) Masaki Ohashi	D	4
Target 1/Cosmos	Manatee	Manatee Mk.IV	Mazda RE13B 1.3 L 2-rotor	22	(Japan) Yoshifumi Yamazaki	D	4
Cream Matsugae	West	West 83S-II	Mazda RE13B 1.3 L 2-rotor	29	(Japan) Norihiro Takeda	D	1
Cream Matsugae	West	West 83S-II	Mazda RE13B 1.3 L 2-rotor	29	(Japan) Shinji Yamauchi	D	1
Hiro Racing	Hiro	Hiro HRS-1	Mazda RE13B 1.3 L 2-rotor	30	(Japan) Kozo Okumura	D	4
Hiro Racing	Hiro	Hiro HRS-1	Mazda RE13B 1.3 L 2-rotor	30	(Japan) Fuminori Shimogishi	D	4
Horii Racing	West	West 83S-II	Honda EN1 1.3 L I4	31	(Japan) Nobuyoshi Horii	B	1, 4
Horii Racing	West	West 83S-II	Honda EN1 1.3 L I4	31	(Japan) Kenji Abe	B	1, 4
Central Supply	West	West 83S-II	Honda EN1 1.3 L I4	32	(Japan) Kazuo Emi	B	4
Central Supply	West	West 83S-II	Honda EN1 1.3 L I4	32	(Japan) Toshiharu Suzuki	B	4
Daimyojin	West	West 83S-II	Mazda RE13B 1.3 L 2-rotor	33	(Japan) Keiichi Mizutani	D	1
Daimyojin	West	West 83S-II	Mazda RE13B 1.3 L 2-rotor	33	(Japan) Hiroyuki Kondo	D	1
Cockpit Inazawa	Manatee	Manatee Mk.IV	Mazda RE13B 1.3 L 2-rotor	37	(Japan) Tetsuya Kasai	B	1
Cockpit Inazawa	Manatee	Manatee Mk.IV	Mazda RE13B 1.3 L 2-rotor	37	(Japan) Koji Sato	B	1
THK Bearing	Manatee	Manatee Mk.IV	Mazda RE13B 1.3 L 2-rotor	37	(Japan) Tetsuya Kasai	B	4
THK Bearing	Manatee	Manatee Mk.IV	Mazda RE13B 1.3 L 2-rotor	37	(Japan) Koji Sato	B	4
THK Bearing	Manatee	Manatee Mk.IV	Mazda RE13B 1.3 L 2-rotor	37	(Japan) Fumiko Shinoda	B	4
First Morlding	Collage	Collage FM45	Mazda RE13B 1.3 L 2-rotor	45	(Japan) Makio Nonaka	D	1, 4
First Morlding	Collage	Collage FM45	Mazda RE13B 1.3 L 2-rotor	45	(Japan) Masuo Takada	D	4
Team A-One	Oscar	Oscar SK85	Mazda RE13B 1.3 L 2-rotor	46	(Japan) Keiichi Mizutani	D	4
Team A-One	Oscar	Oscar SK85	Mazda RE13B 1.3 L 2-rotor	46	(Japan) Sadayumi Nakajima	D	4
Shuroku Sasaki	Oscar	Oscar SK85	Mazda RE13B 1.3 L 2-rotor	47	(Japan) Shuroku Sasaki	D	4
Shuroku Sasaki	Oscar	Oscar SK85	Mazda RE13B 1.3 L 2-rotor	47	(Japan) Hisatoyo Goto	D	4
Seiichi Sodeyama	Maxim	Maxim 61S	Mazda RE13B 1.3 L 2-rotor	61	(Japan) Seiichi Sodeyama	D	4
Seiichi Sodeyama	Maxim	Maxim 61S	Mazda RE13B 1.3 L 2-rotor	61	(Japan) Shigeki Matsui	D	4
Motul	West	West 83S-II	Honda EN1 1.3 L I4	66	(Japan) Masashi Kitagawa	B	1, 4
Motul	West	West 83S-II	Honda EN1 1.3 L I4	66	(Japan) Toshiharu Murata	B	1, 4
Team Yamato	Honda	Honda Ballade Sports CR-X	Honda D16A 1.6 L I4	67	(Japan) Tsuguo Ohba	B	1–4, 6
Team Yamato	Honda	Honda Ballade Sports CR-X	Honda D16A 1.6 L I4	67	(Japan) Katsuaki Sato	B	1–2, 4
Team Yamato	Honda	Honda Ballade Sports CR-X	Honda D16A 1.6 L I4	67	(Japan) Ken Mizokawa	B	2–4, 6
Tuning Shop First	Toyota	Toyota Sprinter Trueno	Toyota 4A 1.6 L I4	68	(Japan) Satoshi Fujita	D	4
Tuning Shop First	Toyota	Toyota Sprinter Trueno	Toyota 4A 1.6 L I4	68	(Japan) Shuzo Harako	D	4
Tuning Shop First	Toyota	Toyota Sprinter Trueno	Toyota 4A 1.6 L I4	68	(Japan) Toshio Fujimura	D	4
Senki	West	West 83S-II	Mazda RE13B 1.3 L 2-rotor	77	(Japan) Senkichiro Takeuchi	D	4
Senki	West	West 83S-II	Mazda RE13B 1.3 L 2-rotor	77	(Japan) Seiji Omura	D	4
NEF	BMW	BMW 320i	BMW S14 2.0 L I4	80	(Hong Kong) Adrian Fu	D	4
NEF	BMW	BMW 320i	BMW S14 2.0 L I4	80	(Hong Kong) Michael Liu	D	4

=== A ===
Team	Make	Car	Engine	No.	Drivers	Tyre	Rounds
Kawamura Bankin (Note: Competed as #77 in Rd. 1)	Nissan	Nissan Sunny	Nissan A12 1.3 L I4	10	(Japan) Yasumi Fukao	D	1
Kawamura Bankin	Nissan	Nissan Sunny	Nissan A12 1.3 L I4	10	(Japan) Koichi Nishikawa	D	1
Ogawa	Nissan	Nissan Sunny	Nissan A12 1.3 L I4	15	(Japan) Shigehito Hirabayashi	D	1
Ogawa	Nissan	Nissan Sunny	Nissan A12 1.3 L I4	15	(Japan) Hideki Iida	D	1
Car Shop Kakogawa	Nissan	Nissan Sunny	Nissan A12 1.3 L I4	18	(Japan) Kiyotaka Nonomura	D	1
Car Shop Kakogawa	Nissan	Nissan Sunny	Nissan A12 1.3 L I4	18	(Japan) Mitsuo Yamamoto	D	1
Nagao Fukushima	Toyota	Toyota Starlet	Toyota 4K-E 1.3 L I4	98	(Japan) Nagao Fukushima	D	1
Nagao Fukushima	Toyota	Toyota Starlet	Toyota 4K-E 1.3 L I4	98	(Japan) Kazuhiro Tokuda	D	1

=== GTX ===
Team	Make	Car	Engine	No.	Drivers	Tyre	Rounds
Norikura Engineering	Nissan	Nissan Silvia	Nissan FJ20 2.1 L I4	176	(Japan) Yoshimasa Fujiwara	B	5
Norikura Engineering	Nissan	Nissan Silvia	Nissan FJ20 2.1 L I4	176	(Japan) Makio Nonaka	B	5
Norikura Engineering	Nissan	Nissan Silvia	Nissan FJ20 2.1 L I4	176	(Japan) Junichi Igura	B	5

=== LD-2 ===
Team	Make	Car	Engine	No.	Drivers	Tyre	Rounds
Sansho Kogyo	Mazda	Mazda RX-7 825	Mazda RE13B 1.3 L 2-rotor	6	(Japan) Yoshimasa Matsumoto	D	6
Sansho Kogyo	Mazda	Mazda RX-7 825	Mazda RE13B 1.3 L 2-rotor	6	(Japan) Kenichi Kaneko	D	6
All by Tabata	Mazda	Mazda RX-7 253	Mazda RE13B 1.3 L 2-rotor	7	(Japan) Kenji Shiono	D	3
All by Tabata	Mazda	Mazda RX-7 253	Mazda RE13B 1.3 L 2-rotor	7	(Japan) Masami Yoshino	D	3
RE Amemiya	Mazda	Mazda RX-7 254	Mazda RE13B 1.3 L 2-rotor	14	(Japan) Satoshi Egura	D	3
RE Amemiya	Mazda	Mazda RX-7 254	Mazda RE13B 1.3 L 2-rotor	14	(Japan) Isao Itagaki	D	3
RE Amemiya	Mazda	Mazda RX-7 254	Mazda RE13B 1.3 L 2-rotor	14	(Japan) Yasuo Inoue	D	3
ERC	Mazda	Mazda RX-7 253	Mazda RE13B 1.3 L 2-rotor	16	(Japan) Masaatsu Oya	D	3, 6
ERC	Mazda	Mazda RX-7 253	Mazda RE13B 1.3 L 2-rotor	16	(Japan) Kinji Suzuki	D	3, 6
OZ Racing	Mazda	Mazda RX-7 254	Mazda RE13B 1.3 L 2-rotor	24	(Japan) Kenji Seino	D	2, 6
OZ Racing	Mazda	Mazda RX-7 254	Mazda RE13B 1.3 L 2-rotor	24	(Japan) Mutsuo Kazama	D	2, 6
Mazda Sport Car Club	Mazda	Mazda RX-7 254	Mazda RE13B 1.3 L 2-rotor	30	(Japan) Iwao Sugai	D	2–3, 6
Mazda Sport Car Club	Mazda	Mazda RX-7 254	Mazda RE13B 1.3 L 2-rotor	30	(Japan) Hiroshi Sugai	D	2–3, 6
Mazda Auto Nishi Tokyo	Mazda	Mazda RX-7 254	Mazda RE13B 1.3 L 2-rotor	55	(Japan) Toshiyuki Abe	D	2, 6
Mazda Auto Nishi Tokyo	Mazda	Mazda RX-7 254	Mazda RE13B 1.3 L 2-rotor	55	(Japan) Toshihiro Fukazawa	D	2, 6
Mazda Auto Nishi Tokyo	Mazda	Mazda RX-7 254	Mazda RE13B 1.3 L 2-rotor	55	(Japan) Shigeru Miura	D	2, 6
gains/OPTION	Nissan	Nissan Fairlady Z	Mazda RE13B 1.3 L 2-rotor	56	(Japan) Eiji Yamada	Y	2–3, 6
gains/OPTION	Nissan	Nissan Fairlady Z	Mazda RE13B 1.3 L 2-rotor	56	(Japan) Nobuo Komiya	Y	2–3, 6
gains/OPTION	Nissan	Nissan Fairlady Z	Mazda RE13B 1.3 L 2-rotor	56	(Japan) Shinichi Katsura	Y	2
AMRC	Mazda	Mazda RX-7 253	Mazda RE13B 1.3 L 2-rotor	61	(Japan) Shinya Nishizawa	D	3
AMRC	Mazda	Mazda RX-7 253	Mazda RE13B 1.3 L 2-rotor	61	(Japan) Fumio Suzuki	D	3
AMRC	Mazda	Mazda RX-7 253	Mazda RE13B 1.3 L 2-rotor	81	(Japan) Shinya Nishizawa	D	3
AMRC	Mazda	Mazda RX-7 253	Mazda RE13B 1.3 L 2-rotor	81	(Japan) Fumio Suzuki	D	3
Build Factory	Nissan	Nissan Fairlady Z	Mazda RE13B 1.3 L 2-rotor	68	(Japan) Tetsuya Kawasaki	D	3, 6
Build Factory	Nissan	Nissan Fairlady Z	Mazda RE13B 1.3 L 2-rotor	68	(Japan) Shuji Fujii	D	3, 6
Tomei Jidosha	Nissan	Nissan Sunny	Nissan A12 1.3 L I4	71	(Japan) Yoshiaki Jitsukawa	D	3, 6
Tomei Jidosha	Nissan	Nissan Sunny	Nissan A12 1.3 L I4	71	(Japan) Motoji Sekine	D	3
Tomei Jidosha	Nissan	Nissan Sunny	Nissan A12 1.3 L I4	71	(Japan) Hiroyuki Nodi	D	6
Koyata Engei Racing	Mazda	Mazda RX-7 254	Mazda RE13B 1.3 L 2-rotor	80	(Japan) Shigeru Yokoyama	Y	2–3, 6
Koyata Engei Racing	Mazda	Mazda RX-7 254	Mazda RE13B 1.3 L 2-rotor	80	(Japan) Akio Yokoyama	Y	2–3, 6
Koyata Engei Racing	Mazda	Mazda RX-7 254	Mazda RE13B 1.3 L 2-rotor	80	(Japan) Hachiro Saeki	Y	2
Koyata Engei Racing	Mazda	Mazda RX-7 254	Mazda RE13B 1.3 L 2-rotor	80	(Japan) Kenichi Suzuki	Y	3

=== LD-3 ===
Team	Make	Car	Engine	No.	Drivers	Tyre	Rounds
Myspeed	Toyota	Toyota Sprinter Trueno	Toyota 4A 1.6 L I4	5	(Japan) Koichi Tahara	D	2
Myspeed	Toyota	Toyota Sprinter Trueno	Toyota 4A 1.6 L I4	5	"A. Kharn" (Note: Nationality unknown)	D	2
Toshio Aoyama	Toyota	Toyota Corolla Levin	Toyota 4A 1.6 L I4	19	(Japan) Toshio Aoyama	D	6
Toshio Aoyama	Toyota	Toyota Corolla Levin	Toyota 4A 1.6 L I4	19	(Japan) Yoshio Shimada	D	6
Trust Racing Team	Toyota	Toyota Celica LB Turbo	Toyota 18R-G 2.1 L Turbo I4	21	(Japan) Ryusaku Hitomi	D	2–3, 6
Trust Racing Team	Toyota	Toyota Celica LB Turbo	Toyota 18R-G 2.1 L Turbo I4	21	(Japan) Mitsutake Koma	D	2–3, 6
Trust Racing Team	Toyota	Toyota Celica LB Turbo	Toyota 18R-G 2.1 L Turbo I4	21	(Japan) Shinichi Katsura	D	3
Asano Racing Service	Toyota	Toyota Corolla Levin	Toyota 4A 1.6 L I4	47	(Japan) Takeo Asano	B	6
Asano Racing Service	Toyota	Toyota Corolla Levin	Toyota 4A 1.6 L I4	47	(Japan) Yuji Nihei	B	6
Kaneshin	Toyota	Toyota Starlet	Toyota 4K-E 1.3 L I4	48	(Japan) Masanori Kimura	B	6
Kaneshin	Toyota	Toyota Starlet	Toyota 4K-E 1.3 L I4	48	(Japan) Terumi Kuwahara	B	6
Sinzan Tyre	Nissan	Nissan Sunny	Nissan A12 1.3 L I4	50	(Japan) Hirofumi Sada	Y	6
Sinzan Tyre	Nissan	Nissan Sunny	Nissan A12 1.3 L I4	50	(Japan) Masahiro Akiyama	Y	6

=== LD-4 ===
Team	Make	Car	Engine	No.	Drivers	Tyre	Rounds
Chubu Jidosha Racing	Nissan	Nissan Sunny	Nissan A12 1.3 L I4	10	(Japan) Hiroyuki Nodi	Y	1
Chubu Jidosha Racing	Nissan	Nissan Sunny	Nissan A12 1.3 L I4	10	(Japan) Masami Ishikawa	Y	1
Chubu Jidosha Racing	Nissan	Nissan Sunny	Nissan A12 1.3 L I4	10	(Japan) Makoto Nakamura	Y	1
Matsuoka	Nissan	Nissan Sunny	Nissan A12 1.3 L I4	31	(Japan) Yuji Furuya	B	3
Matsuoka	Nissan	Nissan Sunny	Nissan A12 1.3 L I4	31	(Japan) "S. Sumitashachi"	B	3
SCCN	Nissan	Nissan Sunny	Nissan A12 1.3 L I4	50	(Japan) Masao Endo	B	3
SCCN	Nissan	Nissan Sunny	Nissan A12 1.3 L I4	50	(Japan) Michie Shinbori	B	3

== Schedule ==
All races were held in Japan.

Round	Race	Circuit	Date
1	International Suzuka 500 km	Suzuka Circuit	7 April
2	All Japan Fuji 1000 km	Fuji Speedway	5 May
3	All Japan Fuji 500 Miles	Fuji Speedway	28 July
4	International Suzuka 1000 km	Suzuka Circuit	25 August
5	WEC-Japan	Fuji Speedway	10 October
6	All Japan Fuji 500 km	Fuji Speedway	24 November

== Season results ==
Season results are as follows:

Round	Circuit	Winning team
Round	Circuit	Winning drivers
1	Suzuka Circuit; Report	#38 Dome Motorsport Dome 84C-Toyota
1	Suzuka Circuit; Report	(United Kingdom) Geoff Lees (Sweden) Eje Elgh
2	Mt. Fuji; Report	#1 Trust Racing Team Porsche 956
2	Mt. Fuji; Report	(Australia) Vern Schuppan (Japan) Keiichi Suzuki
3	Mt. Fuji	#25 Advan Sports Nova Porsche 962C
3	Mt. Fuji	(Japan) Kunimitsu Takahashi (Japan) Kenji Takahashi
4	Suzuka Circuit; Report	#25 Advan Sports Nova Porsche 962C
4	Suzuka Circuit; Report	(Japan) Kunimitsu Takahashi (Japan) Kenji Takahashi
5	Mt. Fuji; Report	#28 Hoshino Racing March 85G
5	Mt. Fuji; Report	(Japan) Kazuyoshi Hoshino (Japan) Akira Hagiwara (Japan) Keiji Matsumoto
6	Mt. Fuji	#25 Advan Sports Nova Porsche 962C
6	Mt. Fuji	(Japan) Kunimitsu Takahashi (Japan) Kenji Takahashi

== Point Ranking ==
=== Drivers ===
Rank	Drivers	Number/Team	Points	Wins
1	(Japan) Kunimitsu Takahashi	#25 Advan Sports Nova Porsche 962C	72	3
2	(Japan) Kenji Takahashi	#25 Advan Sports Nova Porsche 962C	72	3
3	(Australia) Vern Schuppan	#1 Trust Racing Team Porsche 956 #60 Trust Racing Team Porsche 956	46	1
4	(United Kingdom) Geoff Lees	#38 Dome Motorsport Dome 84C-Toyota #38 Dome Motorsport Dome 85C-Toyota	41	1
5	(Sweden) Eje Elgh	#38 Dome Motorsport Dome 84C-Toyota #38 Dome Motorsport Dome 85C-Toyota	36	1
