= 1985 1000 km of Fuji =

Layout of the Fuji Speedway (1975–1985)

The 1985 Fuji 1000 Kilometres was the ninth round of the 1985 World Endurance Championship as well as the fifth round of the 1985 All Japan Endurance Championship. It took place at the Fuji Speedway, Japan on October 6, 1985.

== Rain ==
Prior to the start of the race, heavy rain fell on the Fuji circuit. Several racing teams were concerned with the safety of the circuit under such conditions, even leading to the Italian Lancia withdrawing just prior to the warm-up laps. Although the race started, the first ten laps were held under caution in order for the drivers to adapt to the wet circuit. Three teams chose to immediately withdraw before the first lap was even completed, including the two Rothmans Porsches. Within the next several laps, both Tom Walkinshaw Jaguars also returned to the pits to withdraw. The first Japanese squad to withdraw after the race began was the Alpha Cubic Porsche, stopping after only six laps, and followed two laps later by both Mazdas. By time caution was withdrawn at the beginning of the eleventh lap, fifteen cars had already returned to the pits to withdraw. They were joined a lap later by the Bartlett Chevron, the last remaining European entry.

Eighteen cars remained in the event, all Japanese squads. The torrential rain continued however, and after two hours of racing, the organisers chose to end the event after completing only a fourth of the scheduled distance. As the race was shortened, half points were awarded in the Teams Championship, as well as the Drivers Championship, but only to those drivers who had actually had a chance to drive during the race.

== Official results ==
Class winners in bold. Cars failing to complete 75% of the winner's distance marked as Not Classified (NC).

Pos	Class	No	Team	Drivers	Chassis	Tyre	Laps
Pos	Class	No	Team	Drivers	Engine	Tyre	Laps
1	**C1**	**28**	**(Japan) Hoshino Racing**	**(Japan) Kazuyoshi Hoshino (Japan) Akira Hagiwara (Japan) Keiji Matsumoto**	**March 85G**	?	**62**
1	**C1**	**28**	**(Japan) Hoshino Racing**	**(Japan) Kazuyoshi Hoshino (Japan) Akira Hagiwara (Japan) Keiji Matsumoto**	**Nissan VG30ET 3.0 L Turbo V6**	?	**62**
2	C1	12	Panasport Japan	(Japan) Osamu Nakako (Japan) Akio Morimoto (Italy) Emanuele Pirro	LeMans LM05C	?	61
2	C1	12	Panasport Japan	(Japan) Osamu Nakako (Japan) Akio Morimoto (Italy) Emanuele Pirro	Nissan VG30ET 3.0 L Turbo V6	?	61
3	C1	36	(Japan) Tom's	(Japan) Satoru Nakajima (Japan) Masanori Sekiya	Tom's 85C	**B**	61
3	C1	36	(Japan) Tom's	(Japan) Satoru Nakajima (Japan) Masanori Sekiya	Toyota 4T-GT 2.1 L Turbo I4	**B**	61
4	C1	45	(Japan) Auto Beaurex Motorsport	(Japan) Naoki Nagasaka (Japan) Taku Akaike	Tom's 85C	?	61
4	C1	45	(Japan) Auto Beaurex Motorsport	(Japan) Naoki Nagasaka (Japan) Taku Akaike	Toyota 4T-GT 2.1 L Turbo I4	?	61
5	C1	50	(Japan) Hasemi Motor Sport	(Japan) Masahiro Hasemi (Japan) Takao Wada	March 85G	?	60
5	C1	50	(Japan) Hasemi Motor Sport	(Japan) Masahiro Hasemi (Japan) Takao Wada	Nissan VG30ET 3.0 L Turbo V6	?	60
6	C1	60	(Japan) Trust Racing Team	(Australia) Vern Schuppan (South Africa) George Fouché (Japan) Keiichi Suzuki	Porsche 956	?	60
6	C1	60	(Japan) Trust Racing Team	(Australia) Vern Schuppan (South Africa) George Fouché (Japan) Keiichi Suzuki	Porsche Type-935 2.6 L Turbo Flat-6	?	60
7	C1	35	(Japan) Misaki Speed	(Japan) Toshio Suzuki (Japan) Kaoru Hoshino	Tom's 85C	?	59
7	C1	35	(Japan) Misaki Speed	(Japan) Toshio Suzuki (Japan) Kaoru Hoshino	Toyota 4T-GT 2.1 L Turbo I4	?	59
8	C1	30	(Japan) Central 20 Racing Team	(Japan) Aguri Suzuki (Japan) Haruhito Yanagida	Lola T810	**D**	59
8	C1	30	(Japan) Central 20 Racing Team	(Japan) Aguri Suzuki (Japan) Haruhito Yanagida	Nissan VG30ET 3.0 L Turbo V6	**D**	59
9	C1	38	(Japan) Dome Motorsport	(United Kingdom) Geoff Lees (Sweden) Eje Elgh	Dome 85C	**D**	58
9	C1	38	(Japan) Dome Motorsport	(United Kingdom) Geoff Lees (Sweden) Eje Elgh	Toyota 4T-GT 2.1 L Turbo I4	**D**	58
10	C1	37	(Japan) Team Ikuzawa	(United Kingdom) Tiff Needell (United Kingdom) James Weaver	Tom's 85C	?	57
10	C1	37	(Japan) Team Ikuzawa	(United Kingdom) Tiff Needell (United Kingdom) James Weaver	Toyota 4T-GT 2.1 L Turbo I4	?	57
11	**GTU**	**175**	**(Japan) Trust Racing Team**	**(Japan) Mitsutake Koma (Japan) Ryuusaku Hitomi**	**Toyota Celica**	?	**57**
11	**GTU**	**175**	**(Japan) Trust Racing Team**	**(Japan) Mitsutake Koma (Japan) Ryuusaku Hitomi**	**Toyota 2.0 L I4**	?	**57**
12	**GTP**	**172**	**(Japan) Top Fuel Racing**	**(Japan) Norimasa Sakamoto (Japan) Hironobu Tatsumi**	**Mazda RX-7 855**	?	**56**
12	**GTP**	**172**	**(Japan) Top Fuel Racing**	**(Japan) Norimasa Sakamoto (Japan) Hironobu Tatsumi**	**Mazda 13B 1.3 L Turbo 2-Rotor**	?	**56**
13	C1	57	(Japan) Rays Racing Division	(Japan) Hitoshi Ogawa (Japan) Tsunehisa Asai	TOM'S 84C	?	56
13	C1	57	(Japan) Rays Racing Division	(Japan) Hitoshi Ogawa (Japan) Tsunehisa Asai	Toyota 4T-GT 2.1 L Turbo I4	?	56
14	**C2**	**84**	**(Japan) Auto Beaurex Motorsport**	**(Japan) Kazuo Mogi (Japan) Toshio Motohashi**	**Lotec M1C**	?	**55**
14	**C2**	**84**	**(Japan) Auto Beaurex Motorsport**	**(Japan) Kazuo Mogi (Japan) Toshio Motohashi**	**BMW M88 3.5 L I6**	?	**55**
15	**GTX**	**174**	**(Japan) OZ Racing**	**(Japan) Kenji Seino (Japan) Mutsuo Kazama**	**Mazda RX-7 254**	?	**54**
15	**GTX**	**174**	**(Japan) OZ Racing**	**(Japan) Kenji Seino (Japan) Mutsuo Kazama**	**Mazda 13B 1.3 L 2-Rotor**	?	**54**
16	GTX	173	(Japan) Mazda Sport Car Club	(Japan) Iwao Sugai (Japan) Hiroshi Sugai	Mazda RX-7 254	?	50
16	GTX	173	(Japan) Mazda Sport Car Club	(Japan) Iwao Sugai (Japan) Hiroshi Sugai	Mazda 13B 1.3 L 2-Rotor	?	50
17 DNF	C2	96	(Japan) Mr. S Racing Product	(Japan) Syuuji Fujii (Japan) Seiichi Sodeyama (Japan) Tooru Sawada	Mishima Auto 84C	?	51
17 DNF	C2	96	(Japan) Mr. S Racing Product	(Japan) Syuuji Fujii (Japan) Seiichi Sodeyama (Japan) Tooru Sawada	BMW M88 3.5 L I6	?	51
18 DNF	C1	25	(Japan) Advan Sports Nova	(Japan) Kunimitsu Takahashi (Japan) Kenji Takahashi	Porsche 962C	**Y**	34
18 DNF	C1	25	(Japan) Advan Sports Nova	(Japan) Kunimitsu Takahashi (Japan) Kenji Takahashi	Porsche Type-935 2.6 L Turbo Flat-6	**Y**	34
19 WD	C2	100	(United Kingdom) Barlett Chevron Racing	(United Kingdom) Robin Smith (Sweden) Kenneth Leim (Republic of Ireland) Martin Birrane	Chevron B62	**A**	11
19 WD	C2	100	(United Kingdom) Barlett Chevron Racing	(United Kingdom) Robin Smith (Sweden) Kenneth Leim (Republic of Ireland) Martin Birrane	Ford Cosworth DFL 3.3 L V8	**A**	11
20 WD	C1	27	(Japan) FromA Racing	(Japan) Jiro Yoneyama (Japan) Hideki Okada	Porsche 956	?	10
20 WD	C1	27	(Japan) FromA Racing	(Japan) Jiro Yoneyama (Japan) Hideki Okada	Porsche Type-935 2.6 L Turbo Flat-6	?	10
21 DNF	C2	98	(United Kingdom) Roy Baker Promotion Ford	(United Kingdom) Roy Baker (United Kingdom) David Andrews	Tiga GC285	**A**	10
21 DNF	C2	98	(United Kingdom) Roy Baker Promotion Ford	(United Kingdom) Roy Baker (United Kingdom) David Andrews	Ford Cosworth BDT 1.8 L Turbo I4	**A**	10
22 WD	C1	7	(Germany) New Man Joest Racing	(Germany) "John Winter" (Italy) Paolo Barilla (Belgium) Marc Duez	Porsche 956B	**D**	9
22 WD	C1	7	(Germany) New Man Joest Racing	(Germany) "John Winter" (Italy) Paolo Barilla (Belgium) Marc Duez	Porsche Type-935 2.6 L Turbo Flat-6	**D**	9
23 WD	C1	14	(United Kingdom) Richard Lloyd Racing	(United Kingdom) Kenny Acheson (United Kingdom) Johnny Dumfries	Porsche 956 GTi	**G**	9
23 WD	C1	14	(United Kingdom) Richard Lloyd Racing	(United Kingdom) Kenny Acheson (United Kingdom) Johnny Dumfries	Porsche Type-935 2.6 L Turbo Flat-6	**G**	9
24 WD	C1	34	(South Africa) Kreepy Krauly Racing (United Kingdom) Cosmik Racing	(Germany) Christian Danner (Greece) Costas Los (Sweden) Anders Olofsson	March 84G	**Y**	9
24 WD	C1	34	(South Africa) Kreepy Krauly Racing (United Kingdom) Cosmik Racing	(Germany) Christian Danner (Greece) Costas Los (Sweden) Anders Olofsson	Porsche Type-956 2.6 L Turbo Flat-6	**Y**	9
25 WD	C2	85	(Japan) Mazdaspeed	(Japan) Yoshimi Katayama (Japan) Takashi Yorino	Mazda 737C	**D**	8
25 WD	C2	85	(Japan) Mazdaspeed	(Japan) Yoshimi Katayama (Japan) Takashi Yorino	Mazda 13B 1.3 L 2-Rotor	**D**	8
26 WD	C2	86	(Japan) Mazdaspeed	(Japan) Yojiro Terada (Republic of Ireland) David Kennedy	Mazda 737C	**D**	8
26 WD	C2	86	(Japan) Mazdaspeed	(Japan) Yojiro Terada (Republic of Ireland) David Kennedy	Mazda 13B 1.3 L 2-Rotor	**D**	8
27 WD	C1	33	(United Kingdom) John Fitzpatrick Racing	(Austria) Jo Gartner (Republic of Ireland) Michael Roe	Porsche 956B	**Y**	6
27 WD	C1	33	(United Kingdom) John Fitzpatrick Racing	(Austria) Jo Gartner (Republic of Ireland) Michael Roe	Porsche Type-935 2.6 L Turbo Flat-6	**Y**	6
28 WD	C1	48	(Japan) Alpha Cubic Racing Team	(Japan) Noritake Takahara (Japan) Chiyomi Totani	Porsche 956B	?	6
28 WD	C1	48	(Japan) Alpha Cubic Racing Team	(Japan) Noritake Takahara (Japan) Chiyomi Totani	Porsche Type-935 2.6 L Turbo Flat-6	?	6
29 WD	C1	51	(United Kingdom) TWR Jaguar	(Denmark) John Nielsen (New Zealand) Mike Thackwell	Jaguar XJR-6	**D**	4
29 WD	C1	51	(United Kingdom) TWR Jaguar	(Denmark) John Nielsen (New Zealand) Mike Thackwell	Jaguar 6.2 L V12	**D**	4
30 WD	C1	52	(United Kingdom) TWR Jaguar	(Germany) Hans Heyer (United Kingdom) Steve Soper	Jaguar XJR-6	**D**	4
30 WD	C1	52	(United Kingdom) TWR Jaguar	(Germany) Hans Heyer (United Kingdom) Steve Soper	Jaguar 6.2 L V12	**D**	4
31 WD	C1	23	Cheetah Automobiles Switzerland	(Belgium) Bernard de Dryver (France) Laurent Ferrier	Cheetah G604	**D**	3
31 WD	C1	23	Cheetah Automobiles Switzerland	(Belgium) Bernard de Dryver (France) Laurent Ferrier	Aston Martin-Tickford 5.3 L V8	**D**	3
32 WD	C1	8	(Germany) New Man Joest Racing	(Germany) "John Winter" (France) Paul Belmondo (Colombia) Mauricio de Narváez	Porsche 956	**D**	2
32 WD	C1	8	(Germany) New Man Joest Racing	(Germany) "John Winter" (France) Paul Belmondo (Colombia) Mauricio de Narváez	Porsche Type-935 2.6 L Turbo Flat-6	**D**	2
33 WD	C1	1	(Germany) Rothmans Porsche	(Germany) Jochen Mass (Belgium) Jacky Ickx	Porsche 962C	**D**	0
33 WD	C1	1	(Germany) Rothmans Porsche	(Germany) Jochen Mass (Belgium) Jacky Ickx	Porsche Type-935 2.6 L Turbo Flat-6	**D**	0
34 WD	C1	2	(Germany) Rothmans Porsche	(Germany) Hans-Joachim Stuck (United Kingdom) Derek Bell	Porsche 956	**D**	0
34 WD	C1	2	(Germany) Rothmans Porsche	(Germany) Hans-Joachim Stuck (United Kingdom) Derek Bell	Porsche Type-935 2.6 L Turbo Flat-6	**D**	0
35 WD	C2	74	(Germany) Gebhardt Motorsport	(Sweden) Stanley Dickens (Germany) Frank Jelinski (Canada) John Graham	Gebhardt JC853	**A**	0
35 WD	C2	74	(Germany) Gebhardt Motorsport	(Sweden) Stanley Dickens (Germany) Frank Jelinski (Canada) John Graham	Ford Cosworth DFV 3.0 L V8	**A**	0
DNS	C1	47	(Japan) Garage Italiya	(France) Henri Pescarolo (Italy) Lucio Cesario	Lancia LC2	?	-
DNS	C1	47	(Japan) Garage Italiya	(France) Henri Pescarolo (Italy) Lucio Cesario	Ferrari 308C 3.0 L Turbo V8	?	-
DNQ	C2	99	(United Kingdom) Roy Baker Promotion Ford	(United Kingdom) Roy Baker (United States) Bill Bean	Tiga GC284	**A**	-
DNQ	C2	99	(United Kingdom) Roy Baker Promotion Ford	(United Kingdom) Roy Baker (United States) Bill Bean	Ford Cosworth BDT 1.8 L Turbo I4	**A**	-
DNQ	GTU	176	(Japan) Norikura Engineering	(Japan) Yoshimasa Fujiwara (Japan) Makio Nonaka (Japan) Junichi Igura	Nissan Silvia	?	-
DNQ	GTU	176	(Japan) Norikura Engineering	(Japan) Yoshimasa Fujiwara (Japan) Makio Nonaka (Japan) Junichi Igura	Nissan 2.0 L I6	?	-

== Statistics ==
- Pole Position - #2 Rothmans Porsche - 1:15.92
- Average Speed - 135.379 km/h

World Sportscar Championship
Previous race: 1985 1000 km of Brands Hatch	1985 season	Next race: 1985 800 km of Selangor

All Japan Sports Prototype Championship
Previous race: 1985 1000 km of Suzuka	1985 season	Next race: 1985 500 km of Fuji
