= 1986 All Japan Endurance Championship =

Seasons
- ← 1985 1987 →

The 1986 All Japan Endurance Championship was the fourth season of the All Japan Sports Prototype Championship. The 1986 champion was the #1 Advan Alpha Nova Porsche 962C driven by Kunimitsu Takahashi.

== Entry list ==
=== C/LD-1 ===
- For the WEC-Japan event, JSPC teams used different car numbers to avoid conflicts with the car numbers of the entrants of the World Sportscar Championship; each car's WEC-Japan race number is displayed in tooltips.

Team	Make	Car	Engine	No.	Drivers	Tyre	Rounds
ADVAN Sports Nova	Porsche	Porsche 962C	Porsche 935/82 3.0 L Twin Turbo F6	1	(Japan) Kunimitsu Takahashi	Y	All
ADVAN Sports Nova	Porsche	Porsche 962C	Porsche 935/82 3.0 L Twin Turbo F6	1	(Japan) Kenji Takahashi	Y	All
Alpha Cubic Racing Team	Porsche	Porsche 956B	Porsche 935/79 2.6 L Twin Turbo F6	2	(Japan) Noritake Takahara	B	All
Alpha Cubic Racing Team	Porsche	Porsche 956B	Porsche 935/79 2.6 L Twin Turbo F6	2	(Japan) Chiyomi Totani	B	All
Alpha Cubic Racing Team	Porsche	Porsche 956B	Porsche 935/79 2.6 L Twin Turbo F6	2	(Japan) Kenji Tohira	B	All
Auto Beaurex Motorsport	Toyota	TOM'S 85C	Toyota 4T-GT 2.1 L Turbo I4	3	(Japan) Naoki Nagasaka	D	All
Auto Beaurex Motorsport	Toyota	TOM'S 85C	Toyota 4T-GT 2.1 L Turbo I4	3	(Japan) Taku Akaike	D	1
Auto Beaurex Motorsport	Toyota	TOM'S 85C	Toyota 4T-GT 2.1 L Turbo I4	3	(Sweden) Steven Andskär	D	2–6
Auto Beaurex Motorsport	Toyota	TOM'S 85C	Toyota 4T-GT 2.1 L Turbo I4	5	(Japan) Kazuo Mogi	Y	All
Auto Beaurex Motorsport	Toyota	TOM'S 85C	Toyota 4T-GT 2.1 L Turbo I4	5	(Japan) Toshio Motohashi	Y	1–4
Auto Beaurex Motorsport	Toyota	TOM'S 85C	Toyota 4T-GT 2.1 L Turbo I4	5	(Japan) Hideshi Matsuda	Y	3–5
Auto Beaurex Motorsport	Toyota	TOM'S 85C	Toyota 4T-GT 2.1 L Turbo I4	5	(Japan) Naoki Nagasaka	Y	5
Auto Beaurex Motorsport	Toyota	TOM'S 85C	Toyota 4T-GT 2.1 L Turbo I4	5	(United Kingdom) Will Hoy	Y	6
Trust Racing Team	Porsche	Porsche 962C	Porsche 935/82 3.0 L Twin Turbo F6	7	(Australia) Vern Schuppan	D	All
Trust Racing Team	Porsche	Porsche 962C	Porsche 935/82 3.0 L Twin Turbo F6	7	(South Africa) George Fouché	D	2–5
Trust Racing Team	Porsche	Porsche 962C	Porsche 935/82 3.0 L Twin Turbo F6	7	(Japan) Keiichi Suzuki	D	2–6
Person's Racing Team	Nissan	Nissan R86V	Nissan VG30ET 3.0 L Twin Turbo V6	8	(Japan) Keiji Matsumoto	B	2–6
Person's Racing Team	Nissan	Nissan R86V	Nissan VG30ET 3.0 L Twin Turbo V6	8	(Japan) Aguri Suzuki	B	2–6
Person's Racing Team	Nissan	Nissan R86V	Nissan VG30ET 3.0 L Twin Turbo V6	8	(United Kingdom) Tiff Needell	B	4
CARA International Racing	LeMans	LeMans LM06C	Toyota 4T-GT 2.1 L Turbo I4	12	(Japan) Akio Morimoto	Y	4–6
CARA International Racing	LeMans	LeMans LM06C	Toyota 4T-GT 2.1 L Turbo I4	12	(Germany) Franz Konrad	Y	4–6
Hermanos	MCS	MCS Guppy	BMW M12/7 2.0 L I4	14	(Japan) Yasuo Ishimura	D	4
Hermanos	MCS	MCS Guppy	BMW M12/7 2.0 L I4	14	(Japan) Masahiro Kimoto	D	4
SARD	SARD	SARD MC86X	Toyota 4T-GT 2.1 L Turbo I4	19	(Japan) Shuroku Sasaki	D	3–5
SARD	SARD	SARD MC86X	Toyota 4T-GT 2.1 L Turbo I4	19	(Japan) Yasuhiro Okamoto	D	3–4
SARD	SARD	SARD MC86X	Toyota 4T-GT 2.1 L Turbo I4	19	(Japan) Kiyoshi Misaki	D	4
SARD	SARD	SARD MC86X	Toyota 4T-GT 2.1 L Turbo I4	19	(United Kingdom) David Sears	D	5–6
Central 20 Racing Team	Lola	Lola T810	Nissan VG30ET 3.0 L Twin Turbo V6	20	(Japan) Haruhito Yanagida	D	All
Central 20 Racing Team	Lola	Lola T810	Nissan VG30ET 3.0 L Twin Turbo V6	20	(Japan) Takamasa Nakagawa	D	All
Hoshino Racing (Note: Competed as #28 in Rd. 1)	Nissan	Nissan R86V	Nissan VG30ET 3.0 L Twin Turbo V6	23	(Japan) Kazuyoshi Hoshino	B	1, 3–6
Hoshino Racing	Nissan	Nissan R86V	Nissan VG30ET 3.0 L Twin Turbo V6	23	(Japan) Osamu Nakako	B	1, 3–6
From A Racing	Porsche	Porsche 956B	Porsche 935/79 2.6 L Twin Turbo F6	27	(Japan) Jiro Yoneyama	D	All
From A Racing	Porsche	Porsche 956B	Porsche 935/79 2.6 L Twin Turbo F6	27	(Japan) Hideki Okada	D	All
From A Racing	Porsche	Porsche 956B	Porsche 935/79 2.6 L Twin Turbo F6	27	(Japan) Tsunehisa Asai	D	All
Hasemi Motorsport	Nissan	Nissan R85V	Nissan VG30T/C 3.0 L Twin Turbo V6	32	(Japan) Masahiro Hasemi	B	1–3
Hasemi Motorsport	Nissan	Nissan R85V	Nissan VG30T/C 3.0 L Twin Turbo V6	32	(Japan) Takao Wada	B	1–3
Hasemi Motorsport	Nissan	Nissan R86V	Nissan VG30T/C 3.0 L Twin Turbo V6	32	(Japan) Masahiro Hasemi	B	4–6
Hasemi Motorsport	Nissan	Nissan R86V	Nissan VG30T/C 3.0 L Twin Turbo V6	32	(Japan) Takao Wada	B	4–6
TOM'S	Toyota	TOM'S 85C	Toyota 4T-GT 2.1 L Turbo I4	35	(Japan) Hitoshi Ogawa	B	1–2
TOM'S	Toyota	TOM'S 85C	Toyota 4T-GT 2.1 L Turbo I4	35	(Japan) Toshio Suzuki	B	1
TOM'S	Toyota	TOM'S 85C	Toyota 4T-GT 2.1 L Turbo I4	35	(Japan) Motoharu Kurosawa	B	2
TOM'S	Toyota	TOM'S 85C	Toyota 4T-GT 2.1 L Turbo I4	35	(Japan) Kaoru Hoshino	B	2
TOM'S	Toyota	TOM'S 86C	Toyota 3S-GT 2.1 L Turbo I4	35	(Japan) Hitoshi Ogawa	B	3–6
TOM'S	Toyota	TOM'S 86C	Toyota 3S-GT 2.1 L Turbo I4	35	(Japan) Kaoru Hoshino	B	3–5
TOM'S	Toyota	TOM'S 86C	Toyota 3S-GT 2.1 L Turbo I4	35	(Japan) Motoharu Kurosawa	B	3–4
TOM'S	Toyota	TOM'S 86C	Toyota 3S-GT 2.1 L Turbo I4	35	(Japan) Toshio Suzuki	B	5–6
TOM'S	Toyota	TOM'S 85C	Toyota 4T-GT 2.1 L Turbo I4	36	(Japan) Geoff Lees	B	1–2
TOM'S	Toyota	TOM'S 85C	Toyota 4T-GT 2.1 L Turbo I4	36	(Japan) Masanori Sekiya	B	1–2
TOM'S	Toyota	TOM'S 85C	Toyota 4T-GT 2.1 L Turbo I4	36	(Japan) Toshio Suzuki	B	2
TOM'S	Toyota	TOM'S 86C	Toyota 3S-GT 2.1 L Turbo I4	36	(Japan) Geoff Lees	B	3–5
TOM'S	Toyota	TOM'S 86C	Toyota 3S-GT 2.1 L Turbo I4	36	(Japan) Masanori Sekiya	B	3–6
TOM'S	Toyota	TOM'S 86C	Toyota 3S-GT 2.1 L Turbo I4	36	(Japan) Toshio Suzuki	B	3
TOM'S	Toyota	TOM'S 86C	Toyota 3S-GT 2.1 L Turbo I4	36	(Japan) Satoru Nakajima	B	5–6
Team Ikuzawa	Toyota	TOM'S 85C	Toyota 4T-GT 2.1 L Turbo I4	37	(United Kingdom) Kenny Acheson	D	1–2
Team Ikuzawa	Toyota	TOM'S 85C	Toyota 4T-GT 2.1 L Turbo I4	37	(Republic of Ireland) Michael Roe	D	1–2
Team Ikuzawa	Toyota	TOM'S 86C	Toyota 3S-GT 2.1 L Turbo I4	37	(United Kingdom) Kenny Acheson	D	3–6
Team Ikuzawa	Toyota	TOM'S 86C	Toyota 3S-GT 2.1 L Turbo I4	37	(Republic of Ireland) Michael Roe	D	3–6
Wacoal Dome	Toyota	TOM'S 84C	Toyota 4T-GT 2.1 L Turbo I4	38	(Sweden) Eje Elgh	D	1–2
Wacoal Dome	Toyota	TOM'S 84C	Toyota 4T-GT 2.1 L Turbo I4	38	(Italy) Beppe Gabbiani	D	1–2
Wacoal Dome	Toyota	TOM'S 86C	Toyota 3S-GT 2.1 L Turbo I4	38	(Sweden) Eje Elgh	D	2–6
Wacoal Dome	Toyota	TOM'S 86C	Toyota 3S-GT 2.1 L Turbo I4	38	(Italy) Beppe Gabbiani	D	2–5
Wacoal Dome	Toyota	TOM'S 86C	Toyota 3S-GT 2.1 L Turbo I4	38	(Sweden) Thomas Danielsson	D	6
Mazdaspeed	Mazda	Mazda 757	Mazda RE13G 2.0 L 3-rotor	170	(Japan) Yoshimi Katayama	D	1, 3–6
Mazdaspeed	Mazda	Mazda 757	Mazda RE13G 2.0 L 3-rotor	170	(Japan) Yojiro Terada	D	1, 3–6
Mazdaspeed	Mazda	Mazda 757	Mazda RE13G 2.0 L 3-rotor	170	(Belgium) Pierre Dieudonné	D	1, 4–5
Mazdaspeed	Mazda	Mazda 757	Mazda RE13G 2.0 L 3-rotor	171	(Japan) Takashi Yorino	D	3–6
Mazdaspeed	Mazda	Mazda 757	Mazda RE13G 2.0 L 3-rotor	171	(Republic of Ireland) David Kennedy	D	3–6

=== A ===
Team	Make	Car	Engine	No.	Drivers	Tyre	Rounds
Shinryo Auto	West	West 85S	Mazda RE13B 1.3 L 2-rotor	6	(Japan) Akihiro Masuda	B	1, 4
Shinryo Auto	West	West 85S	Mazda RE13B 1.3 L 2-rotor	6	(Japan) Hideki Uemura	B	1, 4
Heian Jidosha	Manatee	Manatee Mk.IV	Mazda RE13B 1.3 L 2-rotor	8	(Japan) Minoru Ogino	Y	1
Heian Jidosha	Manatee	Manatee Mk.IV	Mazda RE13B 1.3 L 2-rotor	8	(Japan) Satoru Hisada	Y	1
Katayama Racing	Oscar	Oscar SK85	Mazda RE13B 1.3 L 2-rotor	9	(Japan) Shigeo Torige	D	4
Katayama Racing	Oscar	Oscar SK85	Mazda RE13B 1.3 L 2-rotor	9	(Japan) Soichiro Tanaka	D	4
Katayama Racing	Oscar	Oscar SK85	Mazda RE13B 1.3 L 2-rotor	9	(Japan) Hiroaki Ishii	D	4
Levis Cars	West	West 85S	Mazda RE13B 1.3 L 2-rotor	10	(Japan) Nobuyuki Saka	B	1, 4
Levis Cars	West	West 85S	Mazda RE13B 1.3 L 2-rotor	10	(Japan) Nobuo Naka	B	1, 4
Levis Cars	West	West 85S	Mazda RE13B 1.3 L 2-rotor	10	(Japan) Ichiro Mizuno	B	4
Auto Kamida	West	West 85S	Mazda RE13B 1.3 L 2-rotor	11	(Japan) Masako Fujikawa	Y	4
Auto Kamida	West	West 85S	Mazda RE13B 1.3 L 2-rotor	11	(Japan) Shigeki Matsui	Y	4
Daiichi Hanbai	Manatee	Manatee Mk.IV	Mazda RE13B 1.3 L 2-rotor	12	(Japan) Ichiro Mizuno	B	1
Daiichi Hanbai	Manatee	Manatee Mk.IV	Mazda RE13B 1.3 L 2-rotor	12	(Japan) Tetsuya Kasai	B	1
Capris Enterprise	Mazda	Mazda RX-7 253	Mazda RE13B 1.3 L 2-rotor	15	(Japan) Kazuyoshi Sakamoto	B	1
Capris Enterprise	Mazda	Mazda RX-7 253	Mazda RE13B 1.3 L 2-rotor	15	(Japan) Akio Yamamoto	B	1
Capris Enterprise	Mazda	Mazda RX-7 253	Mazda RE13B 1.3 L 2-rotor	15	(Japan) Kenji Iya	B	1
Auto European	West	West 85S	Mazda RE13B 1.3 L 2-rotor	15	(Japan) Katsunori Iketani	Y	4
Auto European	West	West 85S	Mazda RE13B 1.3 L 2-rotor	15	(Japan) Hideo Hosoya	Y	4
Auto European	West	West 85S	Mazda RE13B 1.3 L 2-rotor	15	(Japan) Ryuji Nakajima	Y	4
Cosmos	West	West 85S	Mazda RE13B 1.3 L 2-rotor	17	(Japan) Yoshifumi Yamazaki	D	1, 4
Cosmos	West	West 85S	Mazda RE13B 1.3 L 2-rotor	17	(Japan) Masaki Ohashi	D	1, 4
Cosmos	West	West 85S	Mazda RE13B 1.3 L 2-rotor	17	(Japan) Naoto Chikada	D	4
Tecnica Racing	West	West 83S-II	Mazda RE13B 1.3 L 2-rotor	19	(Japan) Fumiko Shinoda	B	1
Tecnica Racing	West	West 83S-II	Mazda RE13B 1.3 L 2-rotor	19	(Japan) Makoto Nakayama	B	1
Checker/Flat Out	West	West 85S	Mazda RE13B 1.3 L 2-rotor	22	(Japan) Makoto Kaneko	D	4
Checker/Flat Out	West	West 85S	Mazda RE13B 1.3 L 2-rotor	22	(Japan) Tetsuya Ota	D	4
Checker/Flat Out	West	West 85S	Mazda RE13B 1.3 L 2-rotor	22	(Japan) Mutsumi Kumagaya	D	4
Matsumoto Hikkoshi Center	Oscar	Oscar SK85	Mazda RE13B 1.3 L 2-rotor	29	(Japan) Kazuo Emi	D	4
Matsumoto Hikkoshi Center	Oscar	Oscar SK85	Mazda RE13B 1.3 L 2-rotor	29	(Japan) Hideki Ogawa	D	4
Matsumoto Hikkoshi Center	Oscar	Oscar SK85	Mazda RE13B 1.3 L 2-rotor	29	(Japan) Norihiro Takeda	D	4
Horii Racing	West	West 83S-II	Mazda RE13B 1.3 L 2-rotor	31	(Japan) Nobuyoshi Horii	B	1, 4
Horii Racing	West	West 83S-II	Mazda RE13B 1.3 L 2-rotor	31	(Japan) Hajime Kajiwara	B	1, 4
Taisei Insatsu	West	West 83S-II	Mazda RE13B 1.3 L 2-rotor	33	(Japan) Seiji Imoto	D	4
Taisei Insatsu	West	West 83S-II	Mazda RE13B 1.3 L 2-rotor	33	(Japan) Tadao Yamauchi	D	4
Taisei Insatsu	West	West 83S-II	Mazda RE13B 1.3 L 2-rotor	33	(Japan) Kazuo Fujita	D	4
ADVAN	Manatee	Manatee Mk.IV	Mazda RE13B 1.3 L 2-rotor	39	(Japan) Masakazu Okawa	Y	4
ADVAN	Manatee	Manatee Mk.IV	Mazda RE13B 1.3 L 2-rotor	39	(Japan) Takayuki Kinoshita	Y	4
ADVAN	Manatee	Manatee Mk.IV	Mazda RE13B 1.3 L 2-rotor	39	(Japan) Mitsumasa Watanabe	Y	4
Toda Toso	Nissan	Nissan Sunny	Nissan A12 1.3 L I4	44	(Japan) Katsuhisa Toda	B	4
Toda Toso	Nissan	Nissan Sunny	Nissan A12 1.3 L I4	44	(Japan) Tatsumi Aoyama	B	4
First Mordling	Collage	Collage FM45	Mazda RE13B 1.3 L 2-rotor	45	(Japan) Satoshi Kakimoto	D	1, 4
First Mordling	Collage	Collage FM45	Mazda RE13B 1.3 L 2-rotor	45	(Japan) Taido Hashimoto	D	1
First Mordling	Collage	Collage FM45	Mazda RE13B 1.3 L 2-rotor	45	(Japan) Fuminori Shimogishi	D	4
First Mordling	Collage	Collage FM45	Mazda RE13B 1.3 L 2-rotor	45	(Japan) Masaharu Kinoshita	D	4
First Mordling	Nissan	Nissan Silvia	Nissan FJ20E 2.0 L I4	78	(Japan) Makio Nonaka	D	1
First Mordling	Nissan	Nissan Silvia	Nissan FJ20E 2.0 L I4	78	(Japan) Junichi Ikura	D	1
Limit	Oscar	Oscar SK85	Mazda RE13B 1.3 L 2-rotor	47	(Japan) Hisatoyo Goto	D	1, 4
Limit	Oscar	Oscar SK85	Mazda RE13B 1.3 L 2-rotor	47	(Japan) Shuroku Sasaki	D	1
Limit	Oscar	Oscar SK85	Mazda RE13B 1.3 L 2-rotor	47	(Japan) Kozo Okumura	D	4
Roebel/Modena	Oscar	Oscar SK85	Mazda RE13B 1.3 L 2-rotor	48	(Japan) Keiichi Mizutani	Y	1, 4
Roebel/Modena	Oscar	Oscar SK85	Mazda RE13B 1.3 L 2-rotor	48	(Japan) Naoki Wakasugi	Y	1
Roebel/Modena	Oscar	Oscar SK85	Mazda RE13B 1.3 L 2-rotor	48	(Japan) Yuzo Kamata	Y	4
Roebel/Modena	Oscar	Oscar SK85	Mazda RE13B 1.3 L 2-rotor	48	(Japan) Yoshiyuki Ogura	Y	4
FET	Maxim	Maxim 61S	Mazda RE13B 1.3 L 2-rotor	54	(Japan) Tatsuki Ichijima	D	4
FET	Maxim	Maxim 61S	Mazda RE13B 1.3 L 2-rotor	54	(Japan) Seiichi Sodeyama	D	4
FET	Maxim	Maxim 61S	Mazda RE13B 1.3 L 2-rotor	54	(Japan) Shigeharu Kumakura	D	4
O&K	Toyota	Toyota Sprinter Trueno	Toyota 4A 1.6 L I4	67	(Japan) Satoshi Fujita	D	6
O&K	Toyota	Toyota Sprinter Trueno	Toyota 4A 1.6 L I4	67	(Japan) Shuzo Harako	D	6
O&K	Toyota	Toyota Sprinter Trueno	Toyota 4A 1.6 L I4	86	(Japan) Satoshi Fujita	D	1
O&K	Toyota	Toyota Sprinter Trueno	Toyota 4A 1.6 L I4	86	(Japan) Shuji Fujii	D	1
Rock'n Beat Simon	West	West 83S-II	Mazda RE13B 1.3 L 2-rotor	72	(Japan) Hiroaki Ishii	B	1
Rock'n Beat Simon	West	West 83S-II	Mazda RE13B 1.3 L 2-rotor	72	(Japan) Takeshi Morimoto	B	1
Rock'n Beat Simon	West	West 83S-II	Mazda RE13B 1.3 L 2-rotor	72	(Japan) Yoshiyuki Ogura	B	1
Yukihiro Hane	Manatee	Manatee Mk.IV	Mazda RE13B 1.3 L 2-rotor	72	(Japan) Yukihiro Hane	B	4
Yukihiro Hane	Manatee	Manatee Mk.IV	Mazda RE13B 1.3 L 2-rotor	72	(Japan) Tetsuya Kasai	B	4
Road Runner Racing Team	Mazda	Mazda RX-7 253	Mazda RE13B 1.3 L 2-rotor	77	(Japan) Chikage Oguchi	D	2–4
Road Runner Racing Team	Mazda	Mazda RX-7 253	Mazda RE13B 1.3 L 2-rotor	77	(Japan) Shuji Fujii	D	2, 4
Road Runner Racing Team	Mazda	Mazda RX-7 253	Mazda RE13B 1.3 L 2-rotor	77	(Japan) Kazuhiko Oda	D	3–4

=== LD-2 ===
Team	Make	Car	Engine	No.	Drivers	Tyre	Rounds
OZ Racing	MCS	MCS Guppy	Mazda RE13B 1.3 L 2-rotor	21	(Japan) Kenji Seino	D	2–6
OZ Racing	MCS	MCS Guppy	Mazda RE13B 1.3 L 2-rotor	21	(Japan) Mutsuo Kazama	D	2–6
OZ Racing	MCS	MCS Guppy	Mazda RE13B 1.3 L 2-rotor	21	(Japan) Shuji Fujii	D	5
Mr S Racing Product	MCS	MCS Guppy	BMW M12/7 2.0 L I4	96	(Japan) Toru Sawada	D	3, 5
Mr S Racing Product	MCS	MCS Guppy	BMW M12/7 2.0 L I4	96	(Japan) Seiichi Sodeyama	D	3, 5
Mr S Racing Product	MCS	MCS Guppy	BMW M12/7 2.0 L I4	96	(Japan) Shuji Fujii	D	3

=== LD-3 ===
Team	Make	Car	Engine	No.	Drivers	Tyre	Rounds
Torii Engineering	Toyota	Toyota Sprinter Trueno	Toyota 4A 1.6 L I4	5	(Japan) Hiroyuki Nodi	Y	2–3
Torii Engineering	Toyota	Toyota Sprinter Trueno	Toyota 4A 1.6 L I4	5	(Japan) Masami Ishikawa	Y	2–3
Torii Engineering	Toyota	Toyota Sprinter Trueno	Toyota 4A 1.6 L I4	10	(Japan) Hiroyuki Nodi	Y	6
Torii Engineering	Toyota	Toyota Sprinter Trueno	Toyota 4A 1.6 L I4	10	(Japan) Masami Ishikawa	Y	6
AMRC	Mazda	Mazda RX-7 253	Mazda RE13B 1.3 L 2-rotor	12	(Japan) Shinya Nishizawa	D	2
AMRC	Mazda	Mazda RX-7 253	Mazda RE13B 1.3 L 2-rotor	12	(Japan) Fumio Suzuki	D	2
AMRC	Mazda	Mazda RX-7 253	Mazda RE13B 1.3 L 2-rotor	18	(Japan) Yutaka Fukuda	D	6
AMRC	Mazda	Mazda RX-7 253	Mazda RE13B 1.3 L 2-rotor	18	(Japan) Shinpachi Nishizawa	D	6
ERC	Mazda	Mazda RX-7 253	Mazda RE13B 1.3 L 2-rotor	16	(Japan) Masaatsu Oya	D	2–3, 6
ERC	Mazda	Mazda RX-7 253	Mazda RE13B 1.3 L 2-rotor	16	(Japan) Kinji Suzuki	D	2–3
ERC	Mazda	Mazda RX-7 253	Mazda RE13B 1.3 L 2-rotor	16	(Japan) Yuji Takano	D	3, 6
Mazda Sport Car Club	Mazda	Mazda RX-7 254	Mazda RE13B 1.3 L 2-rotor	30	(Japan) Iwao Sugai	D	2–6
Mazda Sport Car Club	Mazda	Mazda RX-7 254	Mazda RE13B 1.3 L 2-rotor	30	(Japan) Hiroshi Sugai	D	2–6
Mazda Auto Nishi Tokyo	Mazda	Mazda RX-7 254	Mazda RE13B 1.3 L 2-rotor	55	(Japan) Toshihiro Fukazawa	D	2–3, 6
Mazda Auto Nishi Tokyo	Mazda	Mazda RX-7 254	Mazda RE13B 1.3 L 2-rotor	55	(Japan) Shigeru Miura	D	2–3, 6
Mazda Auto Nishi Tokyo	Mazda	Mazda RX-7 254	Mazda RE13B 1.3 L 2-rotor	55	(Japan) Toshiyuki Abe	D	2–3
Build Factory	Nissan	Nissan Fairlady Z	Mazda RE13B 1.3 L 2-rotor	68	(Japan) Tetsuya Kawasaki	D	3, 6
Build Factory	Nissan	Nissan Fairlady Z	Mazda RE13B 1.3 L 2-rotor	68	(Japan) Shuji Fujii	D	3, 6
Tomei Jidosha	Nissan	Nissan Sunny	Nissan A12 1.3 L I4	71	(Japan) Yoshiaki Jitsukawa	D	2–3, 6
Tomei Jidosha	Nissan	Nissan Sunny	Nissan A12 1.3 L I4	71	(Japan) Motoji Sekine	D	2
Tomei Jidosha	Nissan	Nissan Sunny	Nissan A12 1.3 L I4	71	(Japan) Masao Endo	D	3, 6
Tomei Jidosha	Nissan	Nissan Sunny	Nissan A12 1.3 L I4	71	(Japan) Michie Shinbori	D	3
Koyata Engei Racing	Mazda	Mazda RX-7 253	Mazda RE13B 1.3 L 2-rotor	80	(Japan) Shigeru Yokoyama	B	2–3, 6
Koyata Engei Racing	Mazda	Mazda RX-7 253	Mazda RE13B 1.3 L 2-rotor	80	(Japan) Akio Yokoyama	B	2–3, 6
Koyata Engei Racing	Mazda	Mazda RX-7 253	Mazda RE13B 1.3 L 2-rotor	80	(Japan) Kenichi Suzuki	B	3

== Schedule ==
All races were held in Japan.

Round	Race	Circuit	Date
1	International Suzuka 500 km	Suzuka Circuit	6 April
2	All Japan Fuji 1000 km	Fuji Speedway	4 May
3	All Japan Fuji 500 Miles	Fuji Speedway	20 July
4	International Suzuka 1000 km	Suzuka Circuit	24 August
5	WEC-Japan	Fuji Speedway	5 October
6	All Japan Fuji 500 km	Fuji Speedway	23 November

== Season results ==
Season results are as follows:

Round	Circuit	Winning team
Round	Circuit	Winning drivers
1	Suzuka Circuit	#1 Advan Sports Nova Porsche 962C
1	Suzuka Circuit	(Japan) Kunimitsu Takahashi (Japan) Kenji Takahashi
2	Mt. Fuji; Report	#1 Advan Sports Nova Porsche 962C
2	Mt. Fuji; Report	(Japan) Kunimitsu Takahashi (Japan) Kenji Takahashi
3	Mt. Fuji	#7 Trust Racing Team Porsche 956
3	Mt. Fuji	(Australia) Vern Schuppan (Japan) Keiichi Suzuki
4	Suzuka Circuit; Report	#27 FromA Racing Porsche 956
4	Suzuka Circuit; Report	(Japan) Jiro Yoneyama (Japan) Hideki Okada (Japan) Tsunehisa Asai
5	Mt. Fuji; Report	#7 Joest Racing Porsche 956
5	Mt. Fuji; Report	(Italy) Paolo Barilla (Italy) Piercarlo Ghinzani
6	Mt. Fuji	#7 Trust Racing Team Porsche 956
6	Mt. Fuji	(Australia) Vern Schuppan (Japan) Keiichi Suzuki

== Point Ranking ==
=== Drivers ===
Rank	Drivers	Number/Team	Points	Wins
1	(Japan) Kunimitsu Takahashi	#1 Advan Sports Nova Porsche 962C #25 Advan Sports Nova Porsche 962C	70	2
2	(Japan) Kenji Takahashi	#1 Advan Sports Nova Porsche 962C #25 Advan Sports Nova Porsche 962C	70	2
3	(Australia) Vern Schuppan	#7 Trust Racing Team Porsche 956 #60 Trust Racing Team Porsche 956	54	2
4	(Japan) Hideki Okada	#27 FromA Racing Porsche 956	53	1
5	(Japan) Tsunehisa Asai	#27 FromA Racing Porsche 956	53	1
