= 1986 1000 km of Fuji =

The 1986 Mount Fuji 1000 km was the ninth and final round of the 1986 World Sports-Prototype Championship as well as the fifth round of the 1986 All Japan Endurance Championship. It took place at Fuji Speedway, Japan on October 5, 1986.

It was the last victory of a Porsche 956 in the World Championship, in the last race where that type of car could race.

== Official results ==
Class winners in bold. Cars failing to complete 75% of the winner's distance marked as Not Classified (NC).

Pos	Class	No	Team	Drivers	Chassis	Tyre	Laps
Pos	Class	No	Team	Drivers	Engine	Tyre	Laps
1	**C1**	**7**	**(Germany) Joest Racing**	**(Italy) Piercarlo Ghinzani (Italy) Paolo Barilla**	**Porsche 956B**	**G**	**226**
1	**C1**	**7**	**(Germany) Joest Racing**	**(Italy) Piercarlo Ghinzani (Italy) Paolo Barilla**	**Porsche Type-935 2.6L Turbo Flat-6**	**G**	**226**
2	C1	19	(Switzerland) Brun Motorsport	(Germany) Frank Jelinski (Sweden) Stanley Dickens	Porsche 956	**MI**	225
2	C1	19	(Switzerland) Brun Motorsport	(Germany) Frank Jelinski (Sweden) Stanley Dickens	Porsche Type-935 2.8L Turbo Flat-6	**MI**	225
3	C1	51	(United Kingdom) Silk Cut Jaguar Cars	(United Kingdom) Derek Warwick (United States) Eddie Cheever	Jaguar XJR-6	**D**	225
3	C1	51	(United Kingdom) Silk Cut Jaguar Cars	(United Kingdom) Derek Warwick (United States) Eddie Cheever	Jaguar 6.5L V12	**D**	225
4	C1	10	(Germany) Porsche Kremer Racing	(Italy) Bruno Giacomelli (Germany) Volker Weidler	Porsche 962C	**Y**	224
4	C1	10	(Germany) Porsche Kremer Racing	(Italy) Bruno Giacomelli (Germany) Volker Weidler	Porsche Type-935 2.8L Turbo Flat-6	**Y**	224
5	C1	8	(Germany) Joest Racing	(Germany) "John Winter" (Germany) Harald Grohs (Denmark) Kris Nissen	Porsche 956	**G**	223
5	C1	8	(Germany) Joest Racing	(Germany) "John Winter" (Germany) Harald Grohs (Denmark) Kris Nissen	Porsche Type-935 2.6L Turbo Flat-6	**G**	223
6	C1	60	(Japan) Trust Racing Team	(Australia) Vern Schuppan (South Africa) George Fouché (Japan) Keiichi Suzuki	Porsche 956	?	223
6	C1	60	(Japan) Trust Racing Team	(Australia) Vern Schuppan (South Africa) George Fouché (Japan) Keiichi Suzuki	Porsche Type-935 2.6L Turbo Flat-6	?	223
7	C1	18	(Switzerland) Brun Motorsport	(Argentina) Oscar Larrauri (Spain) Jesús Pareja	Porsche 962C	**MI**	222
7	C1	18	(Switzerland) Brun Motorsport	(Argentina) Oscar Larrauri (Spain) Jesús Pareja	Porsche Type-935 2.8L Turbo Flat-6	**MI**	222
8	C1	25	(Japan) Advan Sports Nova	(Japan) Kunimitsu Takahashi (Japan) Kenji Takahashi	Porsche 962C	**Y**	221
8	C1	25	(Japan) Advan Sports Nova	(Japan) Kunimitsu Takahashi (Japan) Kenji Takahashi	Porsche Type-935 2.8L Turbo Flat-6	**Y**	221
9	C1	36	(Japan) Tom's	(Japan) Satoru Nakajima (Japan) Masanori Sekiya (United Kingdom) Geoff Lees	Tom's 86C	**B**	217
9	C1	36	(Japan) Tom's	(Japan) Satoru Nakajima (Japan) Masanori Sekiya (United Kingdom) Geoff Lees	Toyota 4T-GT 2.1L Turbo I4	**B**	217
10	C1	23	(Japan) Hoshino Racing	(Japan) Kazuyoshi Hoshino (Japan) Osamu Nakako	Nissan R86V	**B**	216
10	C1	23	(Japan) Hoshino Racing	(Japan) Kazuyoshi Hoshino (Japan) Osamu Nakako	Nissan VG30ET 3.0L Turbo V6	**B**	216
11	C1	32	(Japan) Nismo Sport	(Japan) Masahiro Hasemi (Japan) Takao Wada	Nissan R86V	**B**	214
11	C1	32	(Japan) Nismo Sport	(Japan) Masahiro Hasemi (Japan) Takao Wada	Nissan VG30ET 3.0L Turbo V8	**B**	214
12	C1	48	(Japan) Alpha Cubic Racing Team	(Japan) Noritake Takahara (Japan) Chiyomi Totani (Japan) Kenji Tohira	Porsche 956B	?	213
12	C1	48	(Japan) Alpha Cubic Racing Team	(Japan) Noritake Takahara (Japan) Chiyomi Totani (Japan) Kenji Tohira	Porsche Type-935 2.6L Turbo Flat-6	?	213
13	**GTP**	**170**	**(Japan) Mazdaspeed**	**(Japan) Yoshimi Katayama (Japan) Yojiro Terada (Belgium) Pierre Dieudonné**	**Mazda 757**	**D**	**213**
13	**GTP**	**170**	**(Japan) Mazdaspeed**	**(Japan) Yoshimi Katayama (Japan) Yojiro Terada (Belgium) Pierre Dieudonné**	**Mazda 13G 1.9L 3-Rotor**	**D**	**213**
14	C1	46	(Japan) Auto Beaurex Motorsport	(Japan) Hideshi Matsuda (Japan) Kazuo Mogi (Japan) Naoki Nagasaka	Tom's 85C	?	213
14	C1	46	(Japan) Auto Beaurex Motorsport	(Japan) Hideshi Matsuda (Japan) Kazuo Mogi (Japan) Naoki Nagasaka	Toyota 4T-GT 2.1L Turbo I4	?	213
15	GTP	171	(Japan) Mazdaspeed	(Japan) Takashi Yorino (Republic of Ireland) David Kennedy	Mazda 757	**D**	212
15	GTP	171	(Japan) Mazdaspeed	(Japan) Takashi Yorino (Republic of Ireland) David Kennedy	Mazda 13G 1.9L 3-Rotor	**D**	212
16	C1	34	(Japan) Cara International Racing	(Japan) Akio Morimoto (Austria) Franz Konrad	LM 06C	?	211
16	C1	34	(Japan) Cara International Racing	(Japan) Akio Morimoto (Austria) Franz Konrad	Toyota 4T-GT 2.1L Turbo I4	?	211
17	C1	52	(United Kingdom) Silk Cut Jaguar Cars	(Netherlands) Jan Lammers (France) Jean-Louis Schlesser (Italy) Gianfranco Brancatelli	Jaguar XJR-6	**D**	211
17	C1	52	(United Kingdom) Silk Cut Jaguar Cars	(Netherlands) Jan Lammers (France) Jean-Louis Schlesser (Italy) Gianfranco Brancatelli	Jaguar 6.5L V12	**D**	211
18	C1	66	(United Kingdom) Cosmic Racing	(Greece) Costas Los (United Kingdom) Tiff Needell	March 84G	**A**	210
18	C1	66	(United Kingdom) Cosmic Racing	(Greece) Costas Los (United Kingdom) Tiff Needell	Porsche Type-935 2.6L Turbo Flat-6	**A**	210
19	**C2**	**79**	**(United Kingdom) Ecurie Ecosse**	**(United Kingdom) Ray Mallock (Belgium) Marc Duez**	**Ecosse C286**	**A**	**210**
19	**C2**	**79**	**(United Kingdom) Ecurie Ecosse**	**(United Kingdom) Ray Mallock (Belgium) Marc Duez**	**Rover V64V 3.0L V6**	**A**	**210**
20	C2	70	(United Kingdom) Spice Engineering	(United Kingdom) Gordon Spice (United Kingdom) Ray Bellm	Spice SE86C	**A**	209
20	C2	70	(United Kingdom) Spice Engineering	(United Kingdom) Gordon Spice (United Kingdom) Ray Bellm	Ford Cosworth DFL 3.3L V8	**A**	209
21	C1	27	(Japan) FromA Racing	(Japan) Jirou Yoneyama (Japan) Hideki Okada (Japan) Tsunehisa Asai	Porsche 956	?	209
21	C1	27	(Japan) FromA Racing	(Japan) Jirou Yoneyama (Japan) Hideki Okada (Japan) Tsunehisa Asai	Porsche Type-935 2.6L Turbo Flat-6	?	209
22	C1	24	(Japan) Central 20 Racing Team	(Japan) Haruhito Yanagida (Japan) Takamasa Nakagawa	March 85G	?	207
22	C1	24	(Japan) Central 20 Racing Team	(Japan) Haruhito Yanagida (Japan) Takamasa Nakagawa	Nissan VG30ET 3.0L Turbo V6	?	207
23	C1	50	(Japan) SARD	(Japan) Syuuroku Sasaki (United Kingdom) David Sears	SARD MC86X	?	206
23	C1	50	(Japan) SARD	(Japan) Syuuroku Sasaki (United Kingdom) David Sears	Toyota 4T-GT 2.1L Turbo I4	?	206
24	C1	35	(Japan) Tom's	(Japan) Toshio Suzuki (Japan) Hitoshi Ogawa (Japan) Kaoru Hoshino	Tom's 86C	**B**	206
24	C1	35	(Japan) Tom's	(Japan) Toshio Suzuki (Japan) Hitoshi Ogawa (Japan) Kaoru Hoshino	Toyota 4T-GT 2.1L Turbo I4	**B**	206
25	C1	1	(Germany) Rothmans Porsche	(Germany) Hans-Joachim Stuck (United Kingdom) Derek Bell	Porsche 962C	**D**	202
25	C1	1	(Germany) Rothmans Porsche	(Germany) Hans-Joachim Stuck (United Kingdom) Derek Bell	Porsche Type-935 3.0L Turbo Flat-6	**D**	202
26	C2	89	(Norway) Schanche Team	(Norway) Martin Schanche (Norway) Torgye Kleppe	Argo JM19	**G**	202
26	C2	89	(Norway) Schanche Team	(Norway) Martin Schanche (Norway) Torgye Kleppe	Zakspeed 1.9L Turbo I4	**G**	202
27	C2	75	(United Kingdom) ADA Engineering	(United Kingdom) Evan Clements (United Kingdom) Ian Harrower	Gebhardt JC843	**A**	123
27	C2	75	(United Kingdom) ADA Engineering	(United Kingdom) Evan Clements (United Kingdom) Ian Harrower	Ford Cosworth DFL 3.3L V8	**A**	123
28	C1	38	(Japan) Dome Motorsport	(Sweden) Eje Elgh (Italy) Beppe Gabbiani	Dome 86C	**D**	198
28	C1	38	(Japan) Dome Motorsport	(Sweden) Eje Elgh (Italy) Beppe Gabbiani	Toyota 4T-GT 2.1L Turbo I4	**D**	198
29	GTP	180	(Japan) Oz Racing	(Japan) Kenji Seino (Japan) Mutsuo Kazama (Japan) Syuuji Fujii	MCS Guppy	?	185
29	GTP	180	(Japan) Oz Racing	(Japan) Kenji Seino (Japan) Mutsuo Kazama (Japan) Syuuji Fujii	Mazda Rotor	?	185
30	C2	85	(Japan) Shizumatsu Racing	(Japan) Seisaku Suzuki (Japan) Tetsuji Shiratori (Japan) Kaneyuki Okamoto	Mazda 737C	?	176
30	C2	85	(Japan) Shizumatsu Racing	(Japan) Seisaku Suzuki (Japan) Tetsuji Shiratori (Japan) Kaneyuki Okamoto	Mazda 13B 1.3L 2-Rotor	?	176
31	C2	99	(United Kingdom) Roy Baker Racing Tiga	(United Kingdom) Roy Baker (United Kingdom) Duncan Bain (Finland) Rudi Thomann	Tiga GC286	**A**	171
31	C2	99	(United Kingdom) Roy Baker Racing Tiga	(United Kingdom) Roy Baker (United Kingdom) Duncan Bain (Finland) Rudi Thomann	Ford Cosworth BDT 1.7L Turbo I4	**A**	171
32 DNF	C1	14	(United Kingdom) Liqui Moly Equipe	(Germany) Klaus Niedzwiedz (Italy) Mauro Baldi	Porsche 956 GTi	**G**	207
32 DNF	C1	14	(United Kingdom) Liqui Moly Equipe	(Germany) Klaus Niedzwiedz (Italy) Mauro Baldi	Porsche Type-935 2.8L Turbo Flat-6	**G**	207
33 DNF	C1	2	(Germany) Rothmans Porsche	(United States) Al Holbert (France) Henri Pescarolo	Porsche 962C	**D**	150
33 DNF	C1	2	(Germany) Rothmans Porsche	(United States) Al Holbert (France) Henri Pescarolo	Porsche Type-935 3.0L Turbo Flat-6	**D**	150
34 DNF	C2	77	(United Kingdom) Chamberlain Engineering	(United Kingdom) Will Hoy (United Kingdom) Gareth Chapman (United Kingdom) Mike Sanders	Tiga TS85	**A**	138
34 DNF	C2	77	(United Kingdom) Chamberlain Engineering	(United Kingdom) Will Hoy (United Kingdom) Gareth Chapman (United Kingdom) Mike Sanders	Hart 418T 1.8L Turbo I4	**A**	138
35 DNF	C1	20	(United Kingdom) Tiga Team	(United Kingdom) Tim Lee-Davey (United Kingdom) Richard Piper	Tiga GC86	**D**	119
35 DNF	C1	20	(United Kingdom) Tiga Team	(United Kingdom) Tim Lee-Davey (United Kingdom) Richard Piper	Ford Cosworth DFL 3.3L Turbo V8	**D**	119
36 DNF	C1	15	(Japan) Person's Racing Team	(Japan) Aguri Suzuki (Japan) Keiji Matsumoto	Nissan R86V	?	68
36 DNF	C1	15	(Japan) Person's Racing Team	(Japan) Aguri Suzuki (Japan) Keiji Matsumoto	Nissan VG30ET 3.0L Turbo V6	?	68
37 DNF	C2	72	(United Kingdom) John Bartlett Racing	(United Kingdom) Robin Donovan (Sweden) Kenneth Leim (Japan) Yoshiyuki Oguwa	Bardon DB1	?	32
37 DNF	C2	72	(United Kingdom) John Bartlett Racing	(United Kingdom) Robin Donovan (Sweden) Kenneth Leim (Japan) Yoshiyuki Oguwa	Ford Cosworth DFL 3.3L V8	?	32
38 DNF	C2	98	(United Kingdom) Roy Baker Racing Tiga	(Australia) Duncan Bain (United Kingdom) David Andrews	Tiga GC286	**A**	19
38 DNF	C2	98	(United Kingdom) Roy Baker Racing Tiga	(Australia) Duncan Bain (United Kingdom) David Andrews	Ford Cosworth BDT 1.7L Turbo I4	**A**	19
39 DNF	C1	37	(Japan) Team Ikuzawa	(United Kingdom) Kenny Acheson (Republic of Ireland) Michael Roe	Tom's 86C	?	16
39 DNF	C1	37	(Japan) Team Ikuzawa	(United Kingdom) Kenny Acheson (Republic of Ireland) Michael Roe	Toyota 4T-GT 2.1L Turbo I4	?	16
40 DNF	C1	45	(Japan) Auto Beaurex Motorsport	(Japan) Naoki Nagasaki (Sweden) Steven Andskär	Tom's 85C	?	6
40 DNF	C1	45	(Japan) Auto Beaurex Motorsport	(Japan) Naoki Nagasaki (Sweden) Steven Andskär	Toyota 4T-GT 2.1L Turbo I4	?	6
DNS	C2	88	(Japan) Mr. S Racing Product	(Japan) Tooru Sawada (Japan) Seiichi Sodeyama	Mishima Auto 84C	?	-
DNS	C2	88	(Japan) Mr. S Racing Product	(Japan) Tooru Sawada (Japan) Seiichi Sodeyama	BMW M88 3.5L I6	?	-
DNQ	GTX	185	(Japan) Road Runner Racing Team	(Japan) Chikage Oguchi (Japan) Kazuhiko Oda	Mazda RX-7	?	-
DNQ	GTX	185	(Japan) Road Runner Racing Team	(Japan) Chikage Oguchi (Japan) Kazuhiko Oda	Mazda 13B 1.3L 2-Rotor	?	-
DNQ	GTX	188	(Japan) Mazda Sport Car Club	(Japan) Iwao Sugai (Japan) Hiroshi Sugai	Mazda RX-7 254	?	-
DNQ	GTX	188	(Japan) Mazda Sport Car Club	(Japan) Iwao Sugai (Japan) Hiroshi Sugai	Mazda 13B 1.3L 2-Rotor	?	-

== Statistics ==
- Pole Position - #17 Brun Motorsport - 2:06.870
- Fastest Lap - #51 Silk Cut Jaguar - 2:09.380
- Average Speed - 179.978 km/h

World Sportscar Championship
Previous race: 1986 1000 km of Spa	1986 season	Next race: None

All Japan Sports Prototype Championship
Previous race: 1986 1000 km of Suzuka	1986 season	Next race: 1986 500 km of Fuji
