= Nissan LM05C =

Race car

The Nissan LM05C is a Group C race car developed by Le Mans Garage (now Le Mans Co., Ltd.) for the 1985 All Japan Endurance Championship (later JSPC).

== Overview ==
The engine is equipped with Nissan's 2.3L inline 4-cylinder turbo FJ23 type. At the same time, a second chassis was equipped with a VG30, and as such the 4 cylinder powered chassis would be Nissan's final inline 4 Group C car.

The debut race was the 1985 Fuji 500 miles (retired 0 laps). He ended up retiring in the following Suzuka 1000 km, but in WEC-JAPAN where it was raining heavily, Osamu Nakako won the 2nd prize and raised a big gold star. In the final round of the Fuji 500 km race, although he was in 8th position in the qualifying, he crashed in the final and ended up with 0 laps. This year's sponsor is the apparel company Parsons.

The following year, in 1986, the VG30 was supplied to Team Le Mans, and the LM05C was also installed and tested, but the chassis rigidity was insufficient and the VG30's power could not be received, so it was abandoned. Team Le Mans will introduce the March 86G chassis.

The LM 05C would be converted from the aforementioned Nissan engine to a Toyota engine for the 1986 season, thus Team Le Mans renamed it the "LM 06C". The engine would be a 2.1L in-line 4-cylinder turbo 4T-G type from Toyota, and Chara International was added as a new sponsor. It managed to finish 10th in the final race, Fuji 500 km.

For the 1987 season, it received a 4-valve 3S-G type, improved the rear cowl, and entered under the name of LM07/Toyota. In addition to placing 7th at the Fuji 1000 km and Suzuka 1000 km, he also placed 2nd in the Fuji 500 km qualifying run in the rain due to Nakako's hand, and also ran fast at the Fuji 500 miles in the rain. The primary sponsor was Apparel Best House.

Participation was limited that year, and it would be the final Group C car produced by Team Le Mans.
