= 1985 500km Suzuka =

The International Suzuka 500 km, was the opening round of the 1985 All Japan Endurance Championship, which was held at the Suzuka Circuit, on 7 April, in front of a crowd of approximately 23,000.

== Report ==
=== Entry ===
A total of 30 cars were entered for the event, across four classes ranging from Modified Hatchbacks to Group C Prototypes.

=== Qualifying ===
The pairing of Kunimitsu Takahashi and Kenji Takahashi took pole position for Advan Sports Nova, in their Porsche 962C ahead of the European partnership of Geoff Lees and Eje Elgh for the Dome Motorsport Team, by just 0.07secs.

=== Race ===
The race was held over 85 laps of the Suzuka circuit, a distance of 500 km (actual distance was 502.690 km). Lees and Elgh took the winner spoils for the Dome Motorsport team, in their Dome-Toyota 84C. The pair won in a time of 3hr 35:59.060 mins., averaging a speed of 87.273 mph. Second place went to Kazuyoshi Hoshino and Akira Hagiwara in the Hoshino Racing March-Nissan 83G who were the only other finisher to complete the full race distance. One lap adrift in third was the Porsche of Kunimitsu Takahashi and Kenji Takahashi.

== Classification ==
Class Winners are in Bold text.

| Pos. | No. | Class | Driver | | Entrant | Car - Engine | Time, Laps | Reason Out |
|---|---|---|---|---|---|---|---|---|
| 1st | **38** | **D** | **(England) Geoff Lees** | **(Sweden) Eje Elgh** | **Dome Motorsport** | **Dome-Toyota 84C** | 3:35:59.060 | |
| 2nd | 28 | D | (Japan) Kazuyoshi Hoshino | (Japan) Akira Hagiwara | Hoshino Racing | March-Nissan 83G | 3:38.10.800 | |
| 3rd | 25 | D | (Japan) Kunimitsu Takahashi | (Japan) Kenji Takahashi | Advan Sports Nova | Porsche 962C | 84 | |
| 4th | 1 | D | (Australia) Vern Schuppan | (Japan) Keiichi Suzuki | Trust Racing Team | Porsche 956B | 83 | |
| 5th | 26 | D | (Japan) Keiji Matsumoto | (Japan) Osamu Nakako | Panasport Japan | LM-Nissan 04C | 82 | |
| 6th | 62 | D | (Japan) Kazuo Mogi | (Japan) Naoki Nagasaka | Auto Beaurex Motorsport | Lotec-BMW M1C | 80 | |
| 7th | 27 | D | (Japan) Jirou Yoneyama | (Japan) Hideki Okada | From A Racing | Porsche 956 | 80 | |
| 8th | **86** | **C** | **(Japan) Yoshimi Katayama** | **(Japan) Yojiro Terada** | **Mazdaspeed** | **Mazda 737C** | 79 | |
| 9th | **45** | **B** | **(Japan) Makio Nonaka** | | **First Morlding** | **Collage-Mazda FM45** | 77 | |
| 10th | 16 | B | (Japan) Ichirou Mizuno | (Japan) Taidou Hashimoto | | Manatee-Mazda Mk.IV | 76 | |
| 11th | 67 | B | (Japan) Tsuguo Ooba | (Japan) Katsuaki Satou | Yamato | Honda Ballade CR-X | 73 | |
| 12th | 33 | B | (Japan) Keiichi Mizutani | (Japan) Hiroyuki Kondou | | West-Mazda 83S II | 71 | |
| 13th | 31 | B | (Japan) Nobuyoshi Horii | (Japan) Kenji Abe | Horii Racing | West-Mazda 83S II | 71 | |
| 14th | 8 | B | (Japan) Masaharu Kinoshita | | | West-Mazda 83S | 71 | |
| 15th | 6 | B | (Japan) Akihiro Masuda | | | West-Mazda 83S II | 70 | |
| 16th | **15** | **A** | **(Japan) Shigehito Hirabayashi** | **(Japan) Hideki Iida** | **Ogawa** | **Nissan Sunny** | 69 | |
| 17th | 9 | B | (Japan) Syuuji Fujii | | | West-Mazda 83S II | 68 | |
| 18th | 18 | A | (Japan) Kiyotaka Nonomura | (Japan) Mitsuo Yamamoto | | Nissan Sunny | 67 | |
| 19th | 21 | B | (Japan) Yukinobu Mizutani | (Japan) Yoshinori Sakurai | | Manatee-Mazda Mk.IV | 67 | |
| 20th | 88 | C | (Japan) Norismaka Sakamoto | (Japan) Takayuki Imadu | Top Fuel Racing | Mazda RX-7 845 | 66 | |
| 21st | 10 | B | (Japan) Nobuyuki Saka | (Japan) Nobuo Naka | Ishida Racing | West-Mazda 83S II | 65 | |
| 22nd | 2 | C | (Japan) Chiyomi Totani | (Japan) Noritake Takahara | Alpha Cubic Racing Team | Renoma-BMW 84C | 57 | DNF |
| DNF | 11 | D | (Japan) Masahiro Hasemi | (Japan) Takao Wada | Hasemi Motorsport | LM-Nissan 04C | 51 | |
| DNF | 5 | B | (Japan) Masami Fujita | (Japan) Ken Mizokawa | Meiwa | Honda Civic | 51 | |
| DNF | 20 | D | (Japan) Haruhito Yanagida | (Japan) Aguri Suzuki | Central 20 Racing Team | LM-Nissan 04C | 34 | fuel |
| DNF | 55 | B | (Japan) Tooru Hirano | (Japan) Hirofumi Nishi | | West-Mazda 83S II | 32 | |
| DNF | 37 | B | (Japan) Tetsuya Kasai | (Japan) Kouji Satou | | Manatee-Mazda Mk.IV | 30 | |
| DNF | 36 | D | (Japan) Satoru Nakajima | (Japan) Masanori Sekiya | TOM's | TOM's-Toyota 85C | 23 | Engine |
| DNF | 29 | B | (Japan) Norihiro Takeda | (Japan) Shinji Yamamoto | | West-Mazda 83S II | 15 | |
| DNF | 77 | A | (Japan) Yasumi Fukao | (Japan) Kouichi Nishikawa | | Nissan Sunny | 1 | |
