= Akira Watanabe (racing driver) =

Japanese racing driver

- Nationality: Japanese
- Born: 15 December 1954 (age 71) Kanagawa Prefecture, Japan
- Debut season: 1967

Previous series
- 1975 1985 1988 1992, 1995 1998–2007: Fuji Freshman Race; All Japan Endurance Championship; Japanese Formula Two Championship; Japanese Touring Car Championship; Super GT

Akira Watanabe (渡辺 明, Watanabe Akira; born 15 December 1954) is a retired Japanese racing driver.

== Racing career ==
Watanabe first began competing in 1975 in the Fuji Freshman Race. He is a noted touring car racing specialist, winning multiple championships in Super Taikyu and the Civic Inter Cup. He competed in a round of the 1988 Japanese Formula 3 Championship at Sendai Hi-Land Raceway but failed to qualify; he would be replaced by Hisashi Wada for the next round.

Watanabe first competed in Super GT in 1985 but did not race full-time until 1998; in that year, he drove a Toyota Cavalier for KRAFT. He last competed in Super GT in 2007. After retiring from active motorsports, Watanabe drove the medical car in Super GT and is still involved with the medical team in some way.

== Racing record ==
=== Complete JSPC results ===
(key) (Races in bold indicate pole position) (Races in italics indicate fastest lap)

Year	Team	Car	Class	1	2	3	4	5	6	DC	Points
1985	Tokico	Mazda RX-7 254	B	SUZ	FUJ; DNS	FUJ; Ret	SUZ; Ret	FUJ	FUJ	NC	0

=== Complete Japanese Formula 3 results ===
(key) (Races in bold indicate pole position) (Races in italics indicate fastest lap)

Year	Team	Chassis	Engine	1	2	3	4	5	6	7	8	9	10	DC	Points
1988	Choro-Q Racing Team Meiju	Reynard 873	Volkswagen GX 2.0 I4	SUZ	TSU	FUJ	SUZ	SUG	TSU	SEN; DNQ	SUZ	NIS	SUZ	NC	0

=== Complete Japanese Touring Car Championship results ===
(key) (Races in bold indicate pole position) (Races in italics indicate fastest lap)

Year	Team	Car	Class	1	2	3	4	5	6	7	8	9	10	11	12	13	14	15	16	DC	Points
1992	Team Over Take	BMW M3 Sport Evolution (E30)	JTCｰ2	TAI	AUT	SUG; 7	SUZ	MIN	TSU; Ret	SEN; 6	FUJ									26th	10
1995	Trans Global	BMW 318i (E36)	JTCC	FUJ1	FUJ2	SUG1	SUG2	TOK1	TOK2	SUZ1	SUZ2	MIN1	MIN2	TAI1	TAI2	SEN1; 20	SEN2; 21	FUJ1	FUJ2	NC	0

=== Complete Super GT results ===
(key) (Races in bold indicate pole position) (Races in italics indicate fastest lap)

Year	Team	Car	Class	1	2	3	4	5	6	7	8	9	DC	Points
1998	KRAFT	Toyota Cavalier	GT300	SUZ	FUJ	SEN; 10	FUJ; 11	MOT; 12	MIN; 7	SUG; 9			24th	7
2000	Team Daikokuya	Porsche 911 RSR	GT300	MOT	FUJ	SUG	FUJ; Ret	TAI	MIN	SUZ; 10			30th	1
2001	Team Daikokuya	Porsche 911 GT3-R	GT300	TAI; Ret	FUJ; 7	SUG	FUJ; Ret	MOT; 16	SUZ	MIN			20th	4
2001	Cars Tokai Dream28	Honda NSX	GT300	TAI	FUJ	SUG	FUJ	MOT	SUZ; 13	MIN			20th	4
2002	Cars Tokai Dream28	Honda NSX	GT300	TAI; 9	FUJ; 14	SUG; 4	SEP; 8	FUJ; 10	MOT; Ret	MIN; Ret	SUZ; 9		16th	22
2003	Cars Tokai Dream28	Honda NSX	GT300	TAI; 5	FUJ; Ret	SUG; 5	FUJ; 21	FUJ; 9	MOT; 19	AUT; 13	SUZ; 8		14th	22
2004	Cars Tokai Dream28	Honda NSX	GT300	TAI; 18	SUG; Ret	SEP; 17	TOK; 17	MOT; 14	AUT; 20	SUZ; 22			NC	0
2005	Verno Tokai Dream28	Vemac RD320R	GT300	OKA; 14	FUJ; 13	SEP; 14	SUG; 9	MOT; 6	FUJ; Ret	AUT; 14	SUZ; 6		14th	12
2006	Team Mach	Vemac RD320R	GT300	SUZ	OKA	FUJ	SEP	SUG	SUZ; 18	MOT	AUT	FUJ	NC	0
2007	Ebbro Team Nova	Vemac RD350R	GT300	SUZ	OKA	FUJ	SEP	SUG	SUZ; 6	MOT	AUT	FUJ	23rd	5
