= Dome 86C =

Racing prototype by Toyota

The Dome 86C (also known as the Toyota 86C, or alternately, the Toyota Dome 86C) was a racing prototype, designed, developed and built by Japanese manufacturer Toyota in partnership and collaboration with Japanese constructor Dome and homologated specifically to race in the FIA Group C category of the Fédération Internationale de l'Automobile. It was powered by a turbocharged 4T-GTE four-cylinder engine, developing between 630–670 hp (470–500 kW), depending on boost pressure. It didn't win any races, with its best result being 4th-place finish at Fuji in 1986.
