= Toyota T engine =

T engine
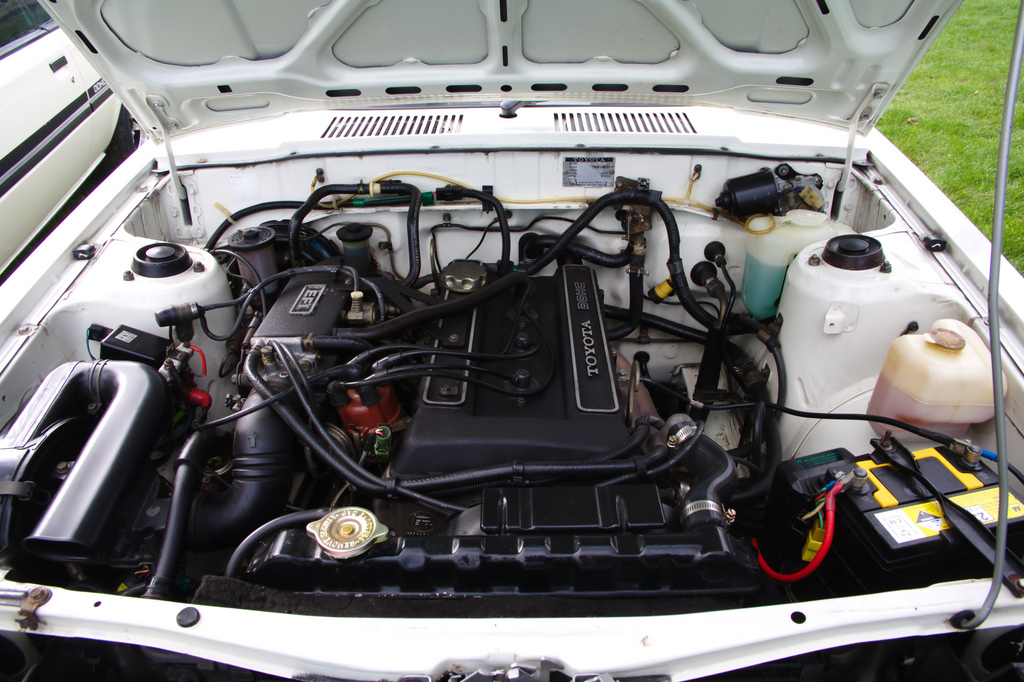
- 2T-GEU engine in a Toyota Sprinter

Overview
- Manufacturer: Toyota
- Production: 1970–1985

Layout
- Configuration: Straight-4
- Displacement: 1,407–2,090 cc
- Cylinder block material: Cast iron
- Cylinder head material: Alloy

Combustion
- Fuel type: Petrol
- Cooling system: Water-cooled

Output
- Power output: 64–441 kW (86–592 hp; 87–600 PS)
- Torque output: 105–206 N⋅m (77–152 lb⋅ft)

The Toyota T series is a family of inline-4 automobile engines manufactured by Toyota beginning in 1970 and ending in 1985. It started as a pushrod overhead valve (OHV) design and later performance oriented twin cam (DOHC) variants were added to the lineup. Toyota had built its solid reputation on the reliability of these engines.

The 4T-GTE variant of this engine allowed Toyota to compete in the World Rally Championship in the early 1980s, making it the first Japanese manufacturer to do so.

Race engines based on the 2T-G include the 100E and 151E.

- All T engines utilize a timing chain and have a cast iron block with an alloy cylinder head with hardened valve seats and a hemispherical combustion chamber design (HEMI).
- All T engines are carburetted except those with electronic fuel injection, "E" designation.
- All T engines use a 2 valve OHV design except those with a DOHC performance head, "G" designation.
- The 12T/13T has a sub-cylinder directly behind the spark plug that leads into a smaller chamber for emission purposes.

== Features overview ==
| Code | Bore mm | Stroke mm | Power PS (kW) | Torque Nm (lbft) | Compression | Years | Comments |
|---|---|---|---|---|---|---|---|
| T | 80 | 70 | 86 (63) at 6,000 rpm | 115 (85) at 3,800 rpm (early); 118 (87) at 3,800 rpm | 8.5:1 | 1970–1979 | |
| T-B | 80 | 70 | 95 (70) at 6,000 rpm | 121 (89) at 4,000 rpm | 9.6:1 | 1970–1975 | dual carburetor |
| T-BR | 80 | 70 | 91 (67) at 6,000 rpm | 118 (87) at 4,000 rpm | 8.5:1 | 1970–1975 | dual carburetor, low compression |
| T-J | 80 | 70 | 80 (59) at 6,000 rpm | 111 (82) at 3,800 rpm | 8.5:1 | 1975-1979 | Japanese emission controls for commercial vehicles |
| T-U | 80 | 70 | 78 (57) at 5,800 rpm (early); 82 (60) at 5,800 rpm | 110 (81) at 3,800 rpm (early); 114 (84) at 3,400 rpm | 8.5:1 (early); 9.0:1 | 1976–197? | Japanese emission controls |
| 2T | 85 | 70 | 100 (74) at 6,000 rpm | 134 (99) at 3,800 rpm | 8.5:1 | | 50 kW and 105 Nm (South Africa) |
| 2T-C | 85 | 70 | 88 (65) at 6,000 rpm | (91) at 3,800 rpm | 8.5:1 | 1970–1979 | emission controls (EGR) |
| 2T-B | 85 | 70 | 105 (77) at 6,000 rpm | 137 (101) at 4,200 rpm | 9.4:1 | 1970–1975 | dual carburetor |
| 2T-BR | 85 | 70 | 100 (74) at 6,000 rpm | 136 (101) at 4,200 rpm | 8.5:1 | 1970–1975 | dual carburetor, low compression |
| 2T-G | 85 | 70 | 115 (85) at 6,400 rpm | 142 (105) at 5,200 rpm | 9.8:1 | 1970–1975 | DOHC, dual carburetor |
| 2T-GR | 85 | 70 | 110 (81) at 6,000 rpm | (101) at 4,800 rpm | 8.8:1 | 1970–1975 | DOHC, dual carburetor, low compression |
| 2T-GEU | 85 | 70 | 115 (85) at 6,000 rpm | 147 (108) at 4,800 rpm | 8.4:1; 9.0:1 (late) | 1978–1985 | DOHC, EFI, Japanese emission controls (TTC-C) |
| 2T-J | 85 | 70 | 84 (62) at 5,400 rpm (TownAce); 93 (68) at 6,000 rpm | 128 (95) at 3,400 rpm (TownAce); 128 (95) at 3,800 rpm | 9.0:1 (TownAce); 8.5:1 | | Japanese emission controls for commercial vehicles |
| 2T-U | 85 | 70 | 90 (66) at 6,000 rpm | 127 (94) at 3,800 rpm | 9.0:1 | 1975– | Japanese emission controls (TTC-C) |
| 12T | 85 | 70 | 85 (63) at 5,400 rpm (early); 90 (66) at 6,000 rpm | 123 (90) at 3,400 rpm (early) (94) at 3,800 rpm | 8.5:1 (early); 9.0:1 | | Japanese emission controls (TTC-L) |
| 12T-J | 85 | 70 | 86 (63) at 5,600 rpm | 128 (95) at 3,400 rpm | 8.8:1 | | Japanese emission controls for commercial vehicles |
| 12T-U | 85 | 70 | 88 (65) at 5,600 rpm | 130 (96) at 3,400 rpm | 9.3:1 | | Japanese emission controls (TTC-V) |
| 3T | 85 | 78 | | | | | |
| 3T-C | 85 | 78 | | | | | emission controls (EGR) |
| 3T-U | 85 | 78 | | | | | Japanese emission controls (TTC-C) |
| 3T-EU | 85 | 78 | 105 (77) at 5,400 rpm | 162 (119) at 3,600 rpm | 9.0:1 | | EFI, Japanese emission controls (TTC-C) |
| 3T-GTE | 85 | 78 | 160 (120) at 6,000 rpm | (152) at 4,800 rpm | 7.8:1 | | DOHC, EFI, turbo, twin spark plugs, Japanese emission controls |
| 3T-GTEU | 85 | 78 | 160 (120) at 6,000 rpm | (152) at 4,800 rpm | 7.8:1 | 1982-1985 | Same as 3T-GTE |
| 13T | 85 | 78 | | | | | Japanese emission controls (TTC-L) |
| 13T-J | 85 | 78 | 95 (70) at 5,400 rpm | 147 (108) at 3,400 rpm | 8.6:1 | | Japanese emission controls for commercial vehicles |
| 13T-U | 85 | 78 | 95 (70) at 5,400 rpm | 147 (108) at 3,400 rpm | 8.6:1 | 1977-1981 | Japanese emission controls (TTC-V) |
| 4T-GTEU | 85.5 | 78 | 180 (130) | | | | Road version, DOHC, EFI, turbo, twin spark plugs, Japanese emission controls, 1,791 cc |
| 4T-GTEU | 89 | 84 | 180 (130) | | | | Race version, DOHC, EFI, KKK turbo, twin spark plugs, 2,090 cc |

== T ==
The first T engine displaced 1.4 L (1,407 cc) and was produced from 1970 through 1979. Cylinder bore and stroke is 80 mm × 70 mm (3.15 in × 2.76 in).

Output is 86 hp (64 kW; 87 PS) at 6,000 rpm and 115 N⋅m (85 lb⋅ft) at 3,800 rpm. The more-powerful 95 PS (70 kW; 94 hp) twin-carburetor T-B was produced for the first six years, as well as the single carb T-D which had a somewhat higher compression ratio for 90 PS (66 kW; 89 hp).

From 1977 there was also a T-J, a version with some simple emissions equipment intended for Japanese market commercial vehicles. With an 8.5:1 compression ratio, this produces 80 PS (59 kW; 79 hp) at 6,000 rpm and 11.3 kg⋅m (111 N⋅m; 82 lbf⋅ft) at 3,800 rpm.

The T-U also appeared in 1977 with even stricter emission equipment for Japanese market non-commercial vehicles.

Applications:

- 1970–1977 Toyota Carina TA10/15/16V (first generation)
- 1977–1979 Toyota Carina Van TA16V (second generation, T-J)
- Toyota Celica TA20
- Toyota Corolla TE20/25
- Toyota Corolla TE30/35/50
- Toyota Sprinter TE40/50

== 2T ==
The larger 1.6 L (1,588 cc) 2T was produced from 1970 through 1984. Cylinder bore and stroke is 85 mm × 70 mm (3.35 in × 2.76 in).

The 2T engines are usually coupled with either a T40 4 speed/T50 5 speed manual transmission, or an A40 3 speed automatic transmission.

Output for the early 2T-C bigport design is 102 PS (75 kW; 101 hp) which is also due to different SAE testing methods, while the later version is 75 PS (55 kW; 74 hp) at 5200 rpm and 116 N⋅m (86 lb⋅ft) at 3800 rpm, compression at 9.0:1. The twin-carb 2T-B produces 90–105 PS (66–77 kW; 89–104 hp) and 115–138 N⋅m (85–102 lb⋅ft). The 2T-J, for commercial vehicles with less restrictive emissions standards, produces 93 PS (68 kW; 92 hp) at 6000 rpm and 13.1 kg⋅m (128 N⋅m; 95 lb⋅ft) at 3800 rpm.

Applications:

- Toyota Corolla E20 to E70 series
- Toyota Carina A10 to A60 series
- Toyota Celica A20 to A60 series
- Toyota Corona TT100/106V/110
- Toyota Corona TT130/137V
- Toyota Corona TT140
- Toyota TownAce TR10V (2T-J)
- Daihatsu Charmant
- Daihatsu Delta Wide TB10

This engine was also commonly used in Australian Formula Two race cars during the 1970s and 1980s, where they typically made between 180 and 200 hp (149 kW; 203 PS). The 1979 championship was won by a Toyota 2T-powered Cheetah Mk6.

=== 2T-G ===
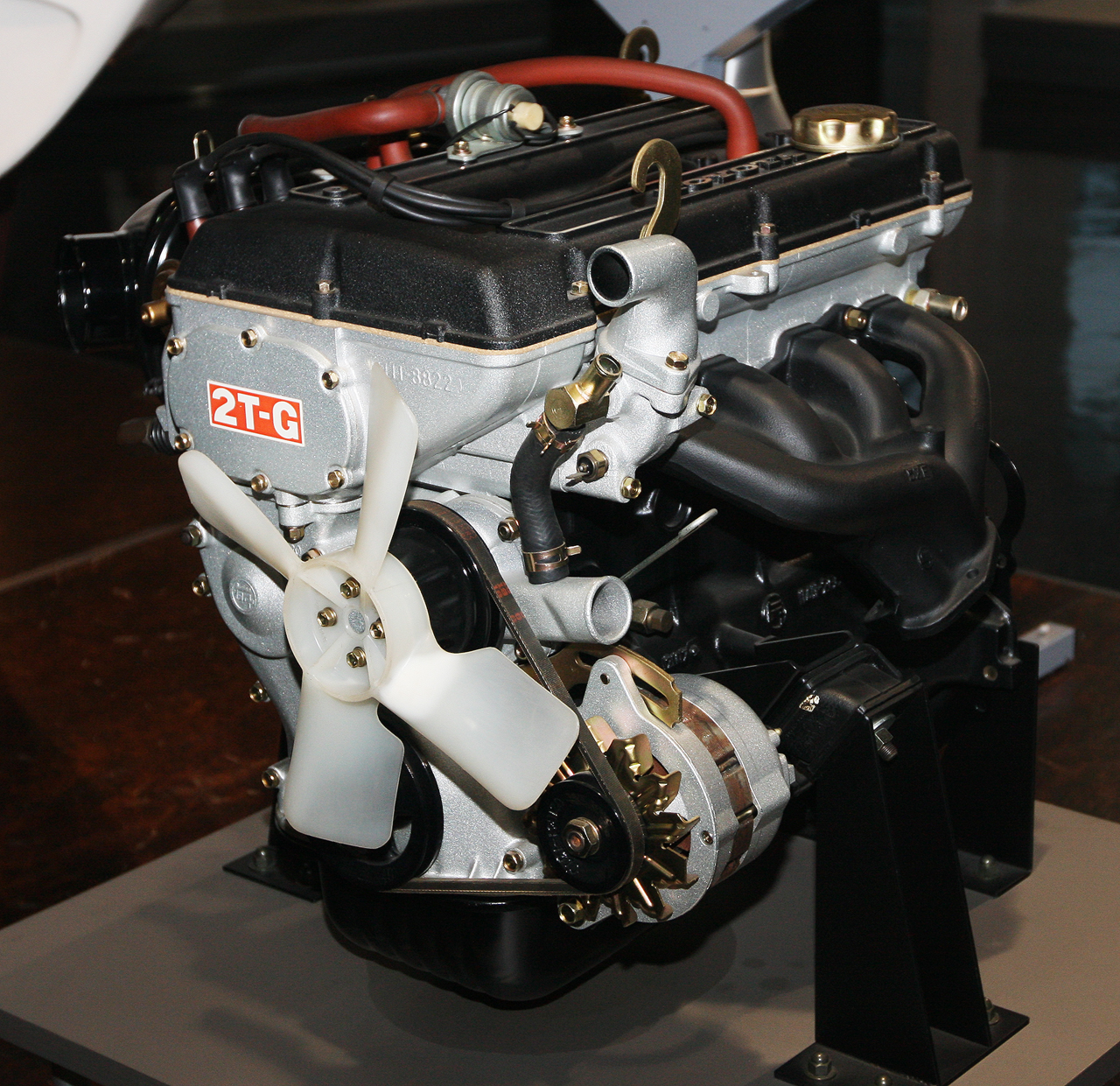
A Toyota 2T-G engine

The 2T-G, produced from 1970 through 1983, is a chain driven 8v DOHC version. Output is 110–125 hp (82–93 kW; 112–127 PS) and 142–147 N⋅m (105–108 lb⋅ft). Variants include the air-injected 2T-GR, Japan-spec 2T-GU, and fuel injected 2T-GEU. Twin sidedraft 40 mm (1.6 in) Mikuni-Solex PHH carburetors were used in non EFI versions. All 2T-G cylinder heads were cast by Yamaha, however, some are not marked as such.

The 2T-G was replaced by the 4A-GE in most applications.

Applications:

- Toyota Corolla Levin/Sprinter Trueno E20 through E70 series
- Toyota Celica A20 through A60 series
- Toyota Carina A10 through A60 series

Like the 2.0 L 18R-G, the 2T-G was considered the flagship engine of Toyota's 1600 class until it was superseded by the 4A-GE in the 1980s. The 2T-G is still a popular engine for conversions to classic Celicas and Corollas and are often suitable for classic and formula racing series.

==== Novamotor ====
When bored out to a maximum of 89 mm (3.5 in) and combined with a 3T crankshaft, the 2T and 2T-G will have a displacement of almost 2.0 L. The 2T and 3T series use the same connecting rod dimensions, with the different pin heights on the pistons. Aftermarket pistons are available from very low (<7.0:1) through to very high (>13.0:1) compression ratios. Racing 2T-G engines ("Nova", tuned by Novamotor of Italy) featured 87 mm × 84 mm (3.43 in × 3.31 in) bore and stroke for a 2.0 L (1,997 cc) displacement. Output is around 170 PS (125 kW; 168 bhp) at 6,000 rpm with a 12.0:1 compression ratio. This engine was used in Formula 3 cars in both Europe and Japan (where it dominated), as well as in Formula Pacific (FP). For instance, at the Monaco F3 race in 1977, all seven finishers (out of 20) used Nova-Toyota engines.

== 12T ==
The 1.6 L (1,588 cc) 12T and 12T-U (lean burn) was produced from 1970 through 1983. It produces 88 hp (66 kW; 89 PS) at 5,600 rpm and 130 N⋅m (96 lb⋅ft) at 3,400 rpm. There was also a 12T-J version for commercial vehicles, which didn't have to meet as stringent emissions standards in Japan. In response to Honda's CVCC emissions, Toyota introduced "TTC-L", using a lean burn implementation.

Applications:

- Toyota Corolla TE52
- Aug 1979–Aug 1981 Toyota Corolla Van TE73 (12T-J)
- Aug 1981–Aug 1983 Toyota Corolla Van TE74 (12T-J)
- Mar 1976–Jul 1977 Toyota Carina TA31-A
- Aug 1977–Aug 1981 Toyota Carina TA41-A
- Aug 1979–Aug 1981 Toyota Carina Van TA49V-A (12T-J)
- Aug 1977–Jun 1981 Toyota Celica TA41-B
- Jan 1980–Feb 1982 Toyota Celica Camry TA41-C
- Aug 1977–Sep 1978 Toyota Corona TT120
- Sep 1978–Dec 1981 Toyota Corona TT130
- Dec 1979–Dec 1981 Toyota Corona Van TT138 (12T-J)
- Jan 1982–Oct 1983 Toyota Corona Van TT147 (12T-J)
- Toyota Sprinter TE66
- Toyota TownAce Wagon TR11G
- Apr 1978–Sep 1981 Daihatsu Charmant A40
- Daihatsu Delta Wide Wagon TB11G

== 3T ==
The 3T displaces 1.8 L (1,770 cc) and was produced from 1973 through 1985. Cylinder bore and stroke is 85 mm × 78 mm (3.35 in × 3.07 in). The 3T-U was originally compliant with Japan's 1976 emissions standards (TTC-C), from October 1977 it used Toyota's lean burn system called TGP ("Turbulence Generating Pot") in order to pass the 1978 emissions standards.

The 3T OHV engines are mated to either of a T40 4-speed, T50 5-speed manual transmission, or an A40 3-speed, or A40D 4-speed automatic transmission.

Output ranges from 70–105 hp (52–78 kW; 71–106 PS) and 126–162 N⋅m (93–119 lb⋅ft) between the California 3T-C and Japan-spec fuel injected 3T-EU.

Applications:

- 1978–1981 Toyota Carina TA47 (also TA57 in Japan)
- Toyota Carina TA60 series
- Toyota Corolla TE72
- Aug 1973–Jan 1977 Toyota Corona TT121
- Toyota Corona TT130 series
- Toyota Corona TT141
- Toyota Celica A60 series
- Toyota Celica Camry TA50 series
- Toyota Mark II/Chaser TX30 series

== 13T ==
The 1.8 L (1,770 cc) 13T-U was produced from 1977 through 1982. It produces 95 PS (70 kW; 94 hp) at 5,400 rpm and 15 kg⋅m (150 N⋅m; 110 lbf⋅ft) at 3,400 rpm with a twin barrel carburettor.

Applications:

- Aug 1979–Aug 1981 Toyota Corolla TE70 (Japan only)
- Aug 1979–Aug 1981 Toyota Sprinter TE70 (Japan only)
- Toyota Celica A40 series
- Jan 1980– ? Toyota Celica Camry TA46
- Toyota TownAce TR15
- Toyota TownAce Truck TM20
- Jul 1977–Sep 1978 Toyota Corona TT126
- Mar 1980–Aug 1982 Toyota Cresta TX50
- Toyota Chaser and Toyota Mark II TX60
- Daihatsu Delta Wide Wagon TB15G (TownAce)

== 3T-GTE ==
The 3T-GTE, first released in September 1982, is the most performance oriented version of the 1.8 L (1,770 cc) 3T engine. It features a hemi chambered 8v twin-cam head with twin-spark (two spark plugs per cylinder) design and swirl inlet ports for better efficiency. The EFI system saw the introduction of knock control. It is turbocharged by a Toyota CT20 Turbo (the same unit as used in the 2L-T diesel) to generate 160 PS (118 kW; 158 hp) at 6,000 rpm and 206 N⋅m (152 lb⋅ft) at 4,800 rpm. This was the first turbocharged twin-cam engine built in Japan. Units built after May 1983 received a water cooled turbocharger. The engine was considerably over-engineered for durability, for instance featuring doubled cam roller chains, as it was also to form the basis for the 4T-GT competition engines. It either came mated to a W55 5speed manual with a larger 225 mm (8.9 in) clutch and lighter, 8 kg (18 lb) flywheel or an A43D 4-speed automatic transmission.

Applications:

- Sept 1982–Jul 1985 Toyota Celica TA63
- Sept 1982–Jul 1985 Toyota Carina TA63
- Jan 1982–Aug 1985 Toyota Corona TT142

3T-GTE powered vehicles are badged as GT-T or GT-TR.

== 4T-GTE ==
This is the version of the T family which powered Toyota's Group B and World Rally Championship cars. The homologation engine, introduced in November 1982, features a 0.5 mm (0.020 in) increase in bore over the 3T, giving 1.8 L (1,791 cc). With a multiplication factor of 1.4 for turbocharged engines, this equalled 2.5 L (2,507 cc) in the eyes of the FIA, placing the Celica in the 2.5–3.0 L (2,501–3,000 cc) class. The smaller 3T engine would have fit snugly under the 2.5-liter limit, but being in the larger class allowed Toyota to stretch the 4T-GT engine to 2.1 L (2,090 cc), 89 mm × 84 mm (3.50 in × 3.31 in) for a converted displacement of 2.9 L (2,926 cc) which better suited the comparatively heavy Celica.

In race trim it was a high-performance engine of 2.1 L (2,090 cc) with either a Toyota or a KKK/K27 turbocharger, electronic fuel injection, and a twin-spark ignition system, producing 360 to 600 PS (265 to 441 kW; 355 to 592 hp) depending on race trim. The 1984 Group B rally version produced 326 PS (240 kW; 322 hp) at 8,000 rpm. The road going homologation version (4T-GTEU, 200 built) produces 180 PS (132 kW; 178 hp). The total build number, including modified versions, was 228.

Applications:

- Oct 1982–Aug 1983 Toyota Celica (A60) GT-TS TA64
- Toyota Celica Turbo IMSA GTO
- Toyota Supra JGTC
- TOM's 83C
- TOM's 84C
- Dome 85C
- Dome 86C
- Eagle Mk I
- LM 06C

== Race engines ==
The '151E' engine used 4 valves per cylinder.

The '100E' engine used twin spark plugs with 2 valves per cylinder but was used mainly by a Toyota works team.

Italy Nova Corporation produced a 2.0 L engine based on the 2T-G that was used in most of the world F3 cars for a long time.

The production 1.8 L (1,791 cc) 4T-GTE was stretched to 2.1 L (2,090 cc) for race use.

== See also ==
- List of Toyota engines
- T-G Tech Notes
