= TOM'S 84C =

Group C racing car built by Toyota

- Category: Group C sports prototype
- Constructor: Toyota; Tom's)

Technical specifications
- Chassis: Aluminum twin-tube monocoque
- Suspension (front): Double wishbone suspension, coil-spring over damper
- Suspension (rear): Double wishbone suspension, coil-spring over damper
- Length: 4,296 mm (169 in)
- Width: 2,040 mm (80 in)
- Height: 1,032 mm (41 in)
- Wheelbase: 2,412 mm (95 in)
- Engine: Toyota 4T-GTE 2090 cc NA I4 mid-mounted.
- Transmission: Manual transmission
- Fuel: Elf

Competition history
- Notable entrants: (Japan) Toyota Team Tom's
- Debut: 1984 1000 km of Fuji
- Last season: 1985
Races	Wins	Podiums	Poles	F/Laps
16	0	1	0	0
- Constructors' Championships: 0
- Drivers' Championships: 0

The TOM'S 84C was a Group C sports prototype race car, designed, developed and built by TOM'S, in partnership and collaboration with Toyota, for the World Sportscar Championship, All Japan Sports Prototype Championship, and the 24 Hours of Le Mans, in 1984.
