= Dome 85C =

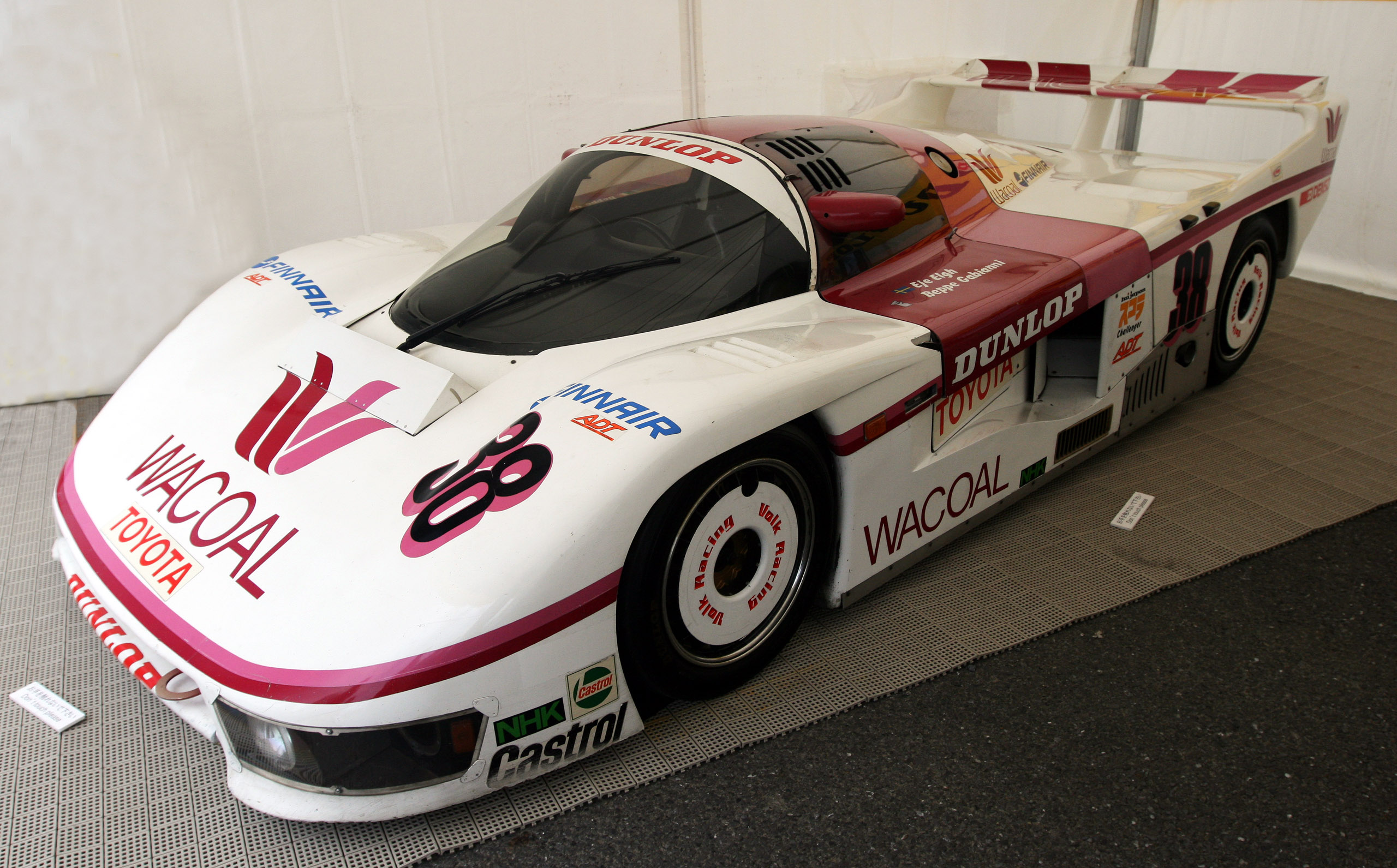
Toyota-Dome 85C

The Dome 85C (also known as the Toyota 85C, or alternately, the Toyota Dome 85C) was a racing prototype, designed, developed and built by Japanese manufacturer Toyota in partnership and collaboration with Japanese constructor Dome and homologated specifically to race in the FIA Group C category of the Fédération Internationale de l'Automobile. It was powered by a 500 hp (370 kW) turbocharged 4T-GTE four-cylinder engine.
