= GReddy =

Japanese automotive aftermarket company

Trust Co. Ltd.
- Company type: Private
- Industry: Automobile tuning & parts manufacturer for street and motorsports
- Founded: April 1977
- Founder: Masamitsu Hayakawa
- Headquarters: Chiba, Japan
- Key people: Masaru Ikeda, President
- Products: Automobile tuning and racing products
- Revenue: 800,000,000 yen
- Owner: Private
- Number of employees: 60
- Website: greddy.com www.trust-power.com

Trust Company Ltd. (株式会社トラスト, Kabushikigaisha Torasuto) is a Japanese automotive aftermarket company specialising in performance tuning parts for cars. The company is widely known for its sub-brand of tuning parts GReddy and the turbochargers under this brand.

== GReddy/The Trust Company LTD ==
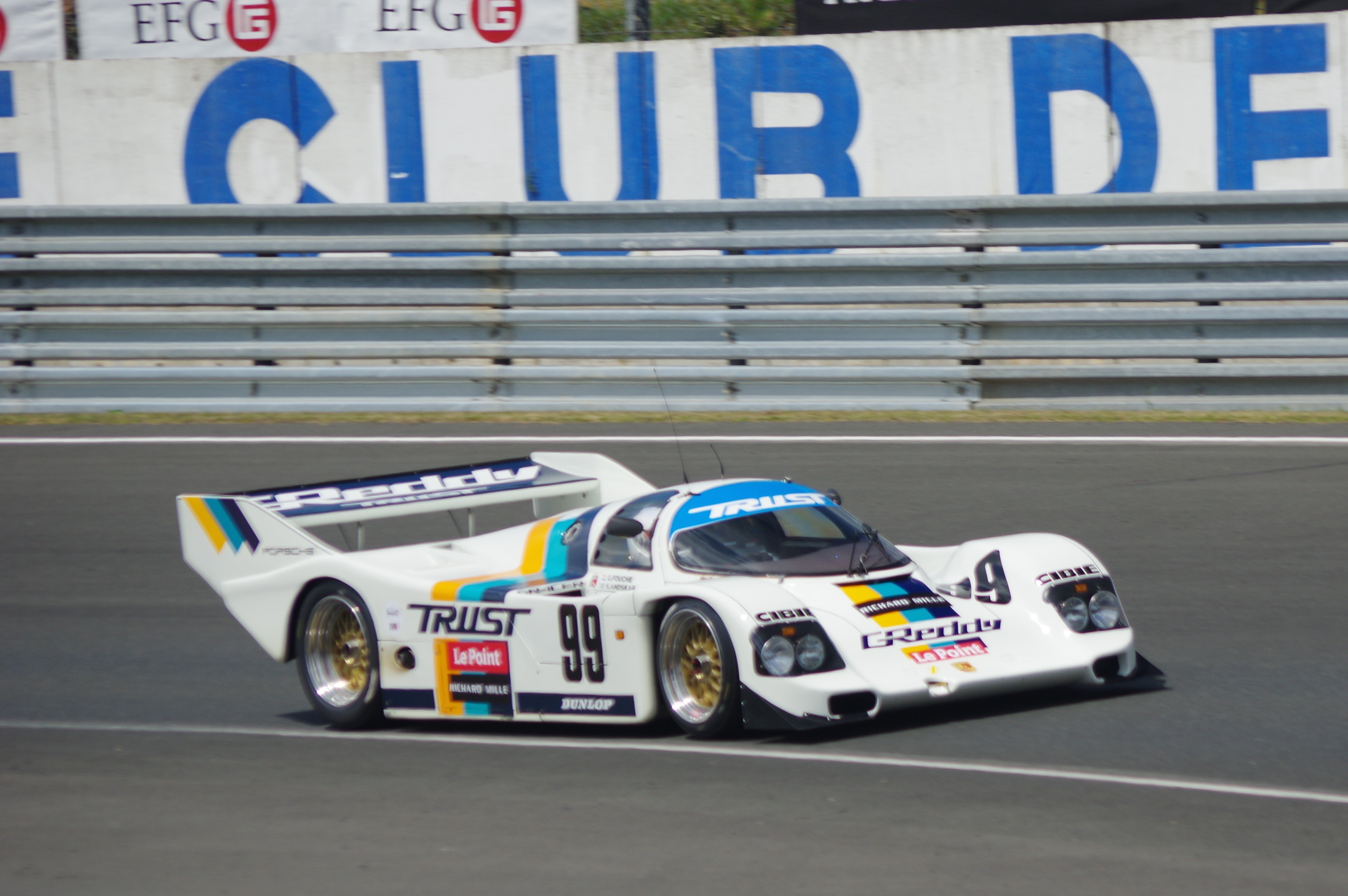
Trust Racing's Porsche 962C

=== The Trust Company ===
Founded in Japan in 1977, The Trust Company LTD manufactured automotive performance products. Their brand names include GReddy, GREX, and GRacer and their products include complete cat-back exhaust systems with straight-through muffler design and bolt-on turbocharger kits.

Since 1994, the development and distribution of Trust Company products in the United States has been accomplished by GReddy Performance Products, based in Irvine, California. Trust was unable to use its own name there as it was already copyrighted, therefore they became officially known as GReddy.

In August 2008 the TRUST Company in Japan consolidated their supply of GReddy products throughout Australia and New Zealand which has culminated in the establishment of GReddy Oceania based in Sydney Australia.

In September 2008, Trust declared bankruptcy. In July 2009, Trust emerged from Minji-saisei-hou, the U.S. equivalent of a Chapter 11 reorganization plan

=== GReddy ===
The division that makes exhaust systems, turbo kits, cooling systems, electronics and accessory lines for Japanese and American cars is named GReddy.

GReddy is pronounced GRED-dy, from the words "GREAT" and "Eddy", as in a strong swirling wind current, referring to the strong swirling intake air of a turbocharger.

The GR in uppercase and the eddy in lowercase to show where the two words were combined. It also works well for the GReddy trademarked logo.

== See also ==
- Car tuning
- Sport compact
- SEMA
- Tokyo Auto Salon
