= 1978 Fuji Long Distance Series season =

1978 Fuji Long Distance Series

Seasons
- ← 1977 1979 →

The 1978 Fuji Long Distance Series was the second season of this series, with all races being held at the Fuji International Speedway.

It was contested by Group 6 sportscars (class R2), Group 5 silhouettes (class R1) and touring cars (classes 1, 2 and 3).

== Schedule ==
Round	Race	Circuit	Date
1	Fuji 500 km	Fuji Speedway	9 April
2	Fuji 1000 km	Fuji Speedway	23 July
3	Fuji 500 miles	Fuji Speedway	29 October

== Season results ==
Round	Circuit	Winning team	Winning drivers	Winning car
1	Fuji Speedway	#11 Harada Racing Company	(Japan) Masahiro Hasemi (Japan) Kazuyoshi Hoshino	Alpine A441
2	Fuji Speedway; Report	#5 Katayama Racing	(Japan) Yoshimi Katayama (Japan) Tsunehisa Asai	March 75S-Mazda
3	Fuji Speedway	#5 Katayama Racing	(Japan) Yoshimi Katayama (Japan) Tsunehisa Asai	March 75S-Mazda

== Final standings ==
Rank	Team	Car(s)	Points	Wins
1	(Japan) Katayama Racing	March 75S-Mazda; Chevron B23-Mazda	55	2
2	(Japan) Harada Racing Company	Alpine A441	50	1
3	(Japan) F1 Racing	Chevron B23-BMW	18	0
4	(Japan) Victory Circle Club	Chevron B36-BMW	12	0
	(Japan) Mazda Auto Tokyo	Chevron B36-Mazda	12	0
	(Japan) Tom's	March 73S-Toyota	12	0
