= 1977 Fuji Long Distance Series season =

Sportscar racing season

1977 Fuji Long Distance Series

Seasons
- ← none 1978 →

The 1977 Fuji Long Distance Series was the first season of this series, with all races being held at the Fuji International Speedway.

It was contested by Group 6 sportscars (class R) and touring cars (classes 1, 2 and 3).

== Schedule ==
Round	Race	Circuit	Date
1	Fuji 1000 km	Fuji Speedway	3 May
2	Fuji 500 km	Fuji Speedway	24 July
3	Fuji 500 miles	Fuji Speedway	25 December

== Season results ==
Round	Circuit	Winning team	Winning drivers	Winning car
1	Fuji Speedway; Report	#5 Katayama Racing	(Japan) Yoshimi Katayama (Japan) Takashi Yorino	March 76S-Mazda
2	Fuji Speedway	#8 Victory Circle Club	(Japan) Fumiyasu Satou (Japan) Tetsuji Ozasa	March 74S-BMW
3	Fuji Speedway	#5 Katayama Racing	(Japan) Yoshimi Katayama (Japan) Takashi Yorino	March 76S-Mazda

== Final standings ==
Rank	Team	Car(s)	Points	Wins
1	(Japan) Katayama Racing	March 76S-Mazda	40	2
2	(Japan) Victory Circle Club	March 74S-BMW	39	1
3	(Japan) Central 20 Racing	March 75S-BMW	35	0
4	(Japan) Hayashi Ryouiji Team	Porsche 906; Chevron B36-BMW; Shiden 77-BMW	22	0
5	(Japan) Fushida Racing	Chevron B36-BMW	15	0
6	(Japan) Suzuki Racing	Nissan Sunny	15	0
