= 1979 Fuji Long Distance Series season =

1979 Fuji Long Distance Series

Seasons
- ← 1978 1980 →

The 1979 Fuji Long Distance Series was the third season of this series, with all races being held at the Fuji International Speedway.

It was contested by Group 5 silhouettes and touring cars; Group 6 sportscars were allowed to start races without scoring points.

== Schedule ==
Round	Race	Circuit	Date
1	Fuji 500 km	Fuji Speedway	15 April
2	Fuji 1000 km	Fuji Speedway	29 July
3	Fuji 500 miles	Fuji Speedway	25 November

== Season results ==
Round	Circuit	Overall			Championship		
Round	Circuit	Winning team	Winning drivers	Winning car	Winning team	Winning drivers	Winning car
1	Fuji Speedway	#10 Sakai Racing Enterprise	(Japan) Takashi Yorino (Japan) Masanori Sekiya	March 76S-Mazda	#16 Shizumatsu Racing Team	(Japan) Hisao Yamada (Japan) Seisaku Suzuki	Mazda Savanna RX-3
2	Fuji Speedway; Report	#5 Fushida Racers	(Japan) Hiroshi Fushida (United States) Richard Thomas Geck	Chevron B36-Mazda	#71 Jitsukawa Team	(Japan) Yoshiyuki Jitsukawa (Japan) Setsuo Iwanami	Nissan Sunny Excellent
3	Fuji Speedway	#37 Team Italya With Tetsu	(Japan) Tetsu Ikuzawa (Japan) Satoru Nakajima (Japan) Noritake Takahara	GRD S74-Mazda	#36 Mazda Auto Tokyo	(Japan) Yojiro Terada (Germany) Nico Nicole	Mazda RX-7 252i

== Final standings ==
Rank	Team	Car(s)	Points	Wins
1	(Japan) Advan Racing Team	Nissan Sunny	30	0
2	(Japan) Jitsukawa Team	Nissan Sunny Excellent	24	1
3	(Japan) Mazda Auto Tokyo	Mazda RX-7 252i	20	1
	(Japan) Shizumatsu Racing Team	Mazda Savanna RX-3	20	1
5	(Japan) Going Tokyo Racing	Nissan Sunny	15	0
	(Japan) Racing Service Syouwa	Nissan Sunny	15	0
