= 1980 Fuji Long Distance Series season =

1980 Fuji Long Distance Series

Seasons
- ← 1979 1981 →

The 1980 Fuji Long Distance Series was the fourth season of this series, with all races being held at the Fuji International Speedway.

It was contested by Group 5 silhouettes and touring cars; Group 6 sportscars were allowed to start races without scoring points.

== Schedule ==
Round	Race	Circuit	Date
1	Fuji 500 km	Fuji Speedway	1 June
2	Fuji 1000 km	Fuji Speedway	27 July
3	Fuji 500 miles	Fuji Speedway	23 November

== Season results ==
Round	Circuit	Overall			Championship		
Round	Circuit	Winning team	Winning drivers	Winning car	Winning team	Winning drivers	Winning car
1	Fuji Speedway	#15 Sanada Racing	(Japan) Keiichi Suzuki	Chevron B36-BMW	#6 Speed Star Wheel Racing Team	(Japan) Naohiro Fujita (Japan) Naoki Nagasaka	BMW M1
2	Fuji Speedway; Report	#15 Sanada Racing	(Japan) Keiichi Suzuki (Japan) Mutsuaki Sanada	Chevron B36-BMW	#6 Speed Star Wheel Racing Team	(Japan) Naohiro Fujita (Japan) Naoki Nagasaka	BMW M1
3	Fuji Speedway	#8 Alpha Cubic Racing Team	(Japan) Fumiyasu Satou (Japan) Chiyomi Totani	March 73S-Mazda	#6 Speed Star Wheel Racing Team	(Japan) Naohiro Fujita (Japan) Naoki Nagasaka	BMW M1

== Final standings ==
Rank	Team	Car(s)	Points	Wins
1	(Japan) Speed Star Wheel Racing Team	BMW M1	60	3
2	(Japan) Taku Racing Team	Mazda Savanna RX-3; Mazda RX-7	31	0
3	(Japan) Team Yamato	Honda Civic	30	0
4	(Japan) Advan Racing Team	Nissan Sunny	27	0
	(Japan) Shizumatsu Racing Team	Mazda Savanna RX-3	27	0
6	(Japan) Tekam	Mazda Savanna RX-3	11	0
