= 6 Hours of Fuji =

Endurance sports car event

FIA World Endurance Championship
- Venue: Fuji Speedway
- First race: 1967
- First FIA WEC race: 2012
- Duration: 6 hours
- Previous names: World Endurance Championship in Japan
- Most wins (driver): (Japan) Hiroshi Fushida (4) (Japan) Kazuki Nakajima (4) (Switzerland) Sébastien Buemi (4)
- Most wins (team): (Japan) Toyota Gazoo Racing (9)
- Most wins (manufacturer): Toyota (16)

The 6 Hours of Fuji (formerly the Fuji 1000 Kilometres) is a sports car race held at Fuji Speedway in Oyama, Shizuoka, Japan. The race was held for the first time in 1967, and in 1977 became part of the new Fuji Long Distance Series. In 1982 a second 1000 km race known as WEC in Japan was run as a round of the World Sportscar Championship. The All Japan Sports Prototype Championship was formed in 1983, and since then co-sanctioned this event. The World Championship left after 1988, but the JSPC carried on both races until 1992. The race was revived in 1999 as an attempt to gauge interest in an Asian Le Mans Series; the series never materialized. The race was revived again as a part of the short-lived Japan Le Mans Challenge in 2007. The race returned again as part of the 2012 FIA World Endurance Championship season, but changed to a 6-hour race, with no distance limit.

== Results ==
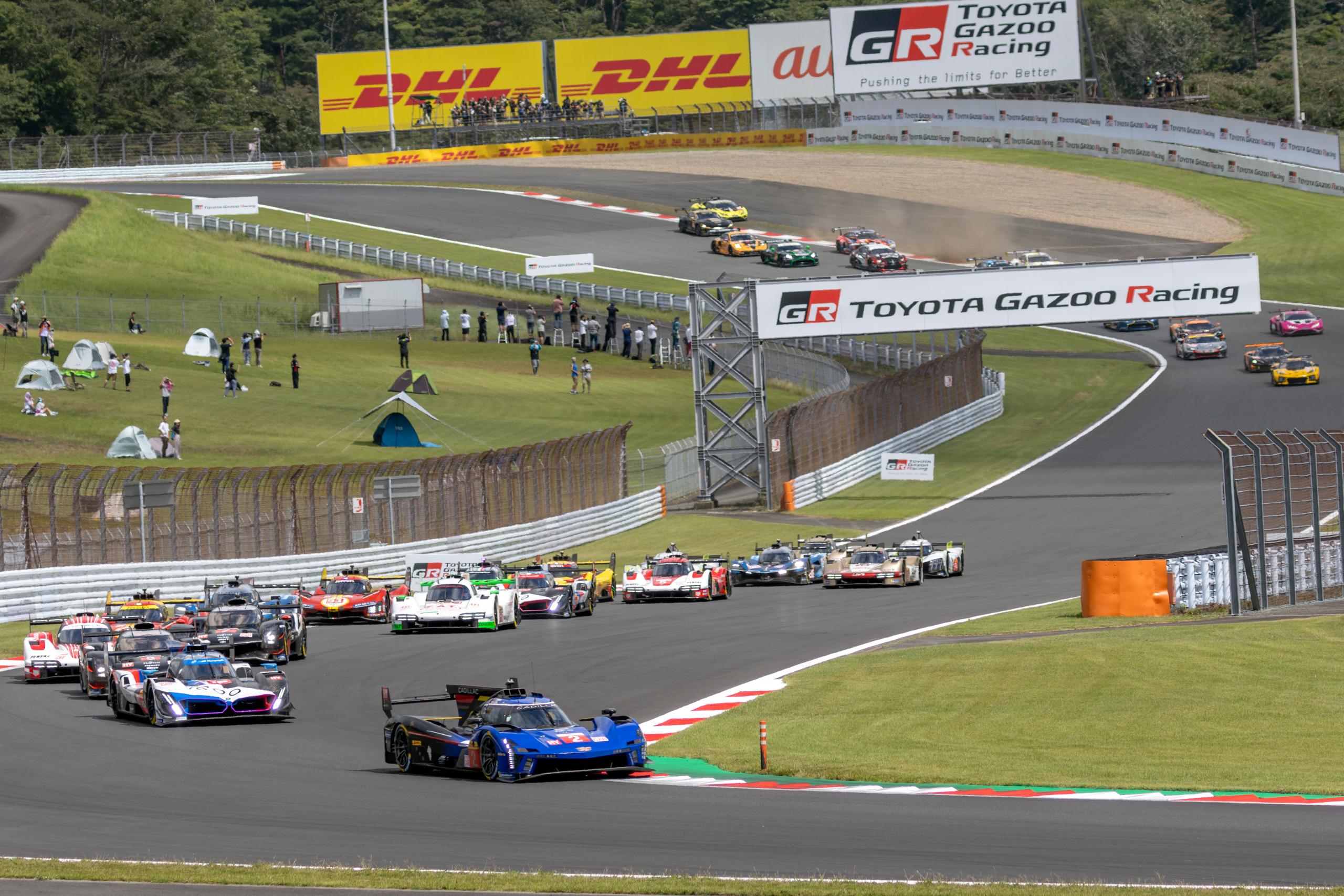
The start of the 2024 6 Hours of Fuji

=== Fuji 1000 km / 6 Hours of Fuji ===
Year	Overall winner(s)	Entrant	Car	Distance/Duration	Race title	Championship	Report
1967	(Japan) Yoshio Otsubo (Japan) Shihomi Hosoya		Toyota 2000GT	1,000 km (620 mi)	1000 km Fuji		
1968	(Japan) Hiroshi Fushida (Japan) Mitsumasa Kanie		Toyota 7	1,000 km (620 mi)	1000 km Fuji		
1969	(Japan) Hiroshi Fushida (Japan) Yoshio Otsubo		Toyota 7	1,000 km (620 mi)	1000 km Fuji		
1970	(Japan) Motoharu Kurosawa (Japan) Kunimitsu Takahashi		Datsun 240Z	1,000 km (620 mi)	1000 km Fuji		
1971	(Japan) Yoshimasa Kawaguchi (Japan) Yoshifumi Kikura		Porsche 910	1,000 km (620 mi)	1000 km Fuji		
1972	(Japan) Kiyoshi Misaki (Japan) Nobuhide Tachi		Toyota Sprinter Trueno	1,000 km (620 mi)	1000 km Fuji		
1973	(Japan) Kiyoshi Misaki (Japan) Harukuni Takahashi		Toyota Celica	1,000 km (620 mi)	1000 km Fuji		
1974	(Japan) Hiroshi Fushida (Japan) Harukuni Takahashi		Chevron B21-Ford	1,000 km (620 mi)	1000 km Fuji		
1975	(Japan) Nobuhide Tachi (Japan) Haruhito Yanagida		March 73S-BMW	1,000 km (620 mi)	1000 km Fuji		
1976	(Japan) Fumiyasu Sato (Japan) Tetsuji Ozasa		March 73S-BMW	1,000 km (620 mi)	1000 km Fuji		
1977	(Japan) Yoshimi Katayama (Japan) Takashi Yorino	(Japan) Katayama Racing	March 76S-Mazda	1,000 km (620 mi)	Fuji 1000 Kilometres	Fuji Long Distance Series	
1978	(Japan) Yoshimi Katayama (Japan) Tsunehisa Asai	(Japan) Katayama Racing	March 75S-Mazda	1,000 km (620 mi)	Fuji 1000 Kilometres	Fuji Long Distance Series	
1979	(Japan) Hiroshi Fushida (United States) Richard Thomas Geck	(Japan) Fushida Racers	Chevron B36-Mazda	1,000 km (620 mi)	Fuji 1000 Kilometres	Fuji Long Distance Series	
1980	(Japan) Keiichi Suzuki (Japan) Mutsuaki Sanada	(Japan) Sanada Racing	Chevron B36-BMW	1,000 km (620 mi)	Fuji 1000 Kilometres	Fuji Long Distance Series	
1981	(Japan) Naohiro Fujita (Japan) Fumiyasu Sato (Japan) Tetsuji Ozasa	(Japan) Racing Mate Project Team	March 73S-Mazda	1,000 km (620 mi)	Fuji 1000 Kilometres	Fuji Long Distance Series	
1982	(Japan) Naoki Nagasaka (Japan) Fumiyasu Sato	(Japan) Auto Beaurex Motor Sports	BMW M1	1,000 km (620 mi)	All Japan Fuji 1000 Kilometres	Fuji Long Distance Series	
1983	(Japan) Naohiro Fujita (Australia) Vern Schuppan	(Japan) Trust Racing Team	Porsche 956	1,000 km (620 mi)	All Japan Fuji 1000 Kilometres	Fuji Long Distance Series	
1984	(Japan) Kaoru Iida (Japan) Taku Akikake	(Japan) Team Taku	Mazda 83C	1,000 km (620 mi)	All Japan Fuji 1000 Kilometres	Fuji Long Distance Series	
1985	(Japan) Keiichi Suzuki (Australia) Vern Schuppan	(Japan) Trust Racing Team	Porsche 956	1,000 km (620 mi)	All Japan Fuji 1000 Kilometres	All Japan Endurance Championship	
1986	(Japan) Kunimitsu Takahashi (Japan) Kenji Takahashi	(Japan) Advan Sports Nova	Porsche 962C	1,000 km (620 mi)	All Japan Fuji 1000 Kilometres	All Japan Endurance Championship	
1987	(Australia) Alan Jones (Japan) Masanori Sekiya (United Kingdom) Geoff Lees	(Japan) Toyota Team TOM'S	Toyota 87C	1,000 km (620 mi)	All Japan Fuji 1000 Kilometres	All Japan Sports Prototype Championship	
1988	(Denmark) Kris Nissen (Italy) Bruno Giacomelli	(Japan) Leyton House Racing Team	Porsche 962C	1,000 km (620 mi)	All Japan Fuji 1000 Kilometres	All Japan Sports Prototype Championship	
1989	(Japan) Keiji Matsumoto (Australia) Vern Schuppan (Sweden) Eje Elgh	(Australia) Omron Racing	Porsche 962C	1,000 km (620 mi)	JAF Grand Prix All Japan Fuji 1000 km	All Japan Sports Prototype Championship	report
1990	(Austria) Roland Ratzenberger (Japan) Naoki Nagasaka	(Japan) Toyota Team SARD	Toyota 89C-V	1,000 km (620 mi)	All Japan Fuji 1000 Kilometres	All Japan Sports Prototype Championship	report
1991	(Japan) Kazuyoshi Hoshino (Japan) Toshio Suzuki	(Japan) Nissan Motorsports	Nissan R91CP	1,000 km (620 mi)	All Japan Fuji 1000 Kilometres	All Japan Sports Prototype Championship	
1992	(Japan) Kazuyoshi Hoshino (Japan) Toshio Suzuki	(Japan) Nissan Motorsports	Nissan R92CP	1,000 km (620 mi)	Fuji 1000 Kilometres	All Japan Sports Prototype Championship	
1993–1998: Not held
1999	(France) Érik Comas (Japan) Satoshi Motoyama (Japan) Masami Kageyama	(Japan) NISMO	Nissan R391	1,000 km (620 mi)	Le Mans Fuji 1000 Kilometres	Non-championship	report
2000–2006: Not held
2007	(Japan) Hideki Noda (Japan) Shinsuke Yamazaki	(Japan) Hitotsuyama Racing	Zytek 04S	1,000 km (620 mi)	Fuji 1000 km	Japan Le Mans Challenge	report
2008–2011: Not held
2012	(Austria) Alexander Wurz (France) Nicolas Lapierre (Japan) Kazuki Nakajima	(Japan) Toyota Racing	Toyota TS030 Hybrid	6:00:42	6 Hours of Fuji	FIA World Endurance Championship	report
2013	(Austria) Alexander Wurz (France) Nicolas Lapierre (Japan) Kazuki Nakajima	(Japan) Toyota Racing	Toyota TS030 Hybrid	2:56:05; Race Did Not Start (Weather)	6 Hours of Fuji	FIA World Endurance Championship	report
2014	(Switzerland) Sébastien Buemi (United Kingdom) Anthony Davidson	(Japan) Toyota Racing	Toyota TS040 Hybrid	6:00:39	6 Hours of Fuji	FIA World Endurance Championship	report
2015	(Germany) Timo Bernhard (Australia) Mark Webber (New Zealand) Brendon Hartley	(Germany) Porsche Team	Porsche 919 Hybrid	6:00:25	6 Hours of Fuji	FIA World Endurance Championship	report
2016	(France) Stéphane Sarrazin (United Kingdom) Mike Conway (Japan) Kamui Kobayashi	(Japan) Toyota Gazoo Racing	Toyota TS050 Hybrid	6:00:37	6 Hours of Fuji	FIA World Endurance Championship	report
2017	(Switzerland) Sébastien Buemi (United Kingdom) Anthony Davidson (Japan) Kazuki Nakajima	(Japan) Toyota Gazoo Racing	Toyota TS050 Hybrid	4:24:50 (Stopped for fog)	6 Hours of Fuji	FIA World Endurance Championship	report
2018	(United Kingdom) Mike Conway (Japan) Kamui Kobayashi (Argentina) José María López	(Japan) Toyota Gazoo Racing	Toyota TS050 Hybrid	6:00:21	6 Hours of Fuji	FIA World Endurance Championship	report
2019	(Switzerland) Sébastien Buemi (New Zealand) Brendon Hartley (Japan) Kazuki Nakajima	(Japan) Toyota Gazoo Racing	Toyota TS050 Hybrid	6:00:30	6 Hours of Fuji	FIA World Endurance Championship	report
2020: Not Held
2021: Cancelled due to COVID-19 pandemic
2022	(Switzerland) Sébastien Buemi (New Zealand) Brendon Hartley (Japan) Ryō Hirakawa	(Japan) Toyota Gazoo Racing	Toyota GR010 Hybrid	6:01:23	6 Hours of Fuji	FIA World Endurance Championship	report
2023	(United Kingdom) Mike Conway (Japan) Kamui Kobayashi (Argentina) José María López	(Japan) Toyota Gazoo Racing	Toyota GR010 Hybrid	6:01:17	6 Hours of Fuji	FIA World Endurance Championship	report
2024	(France) Kévin Estre (Germany) André Lotterer (Belgium) Laurens Vanthoor	(Germany) Porsche Penske Motorsport	Porsche 963	6:00:32	6 Hours of Fuji	FIA World Endurance Championship	report
2025	(France) Paul-Loup Chatin (Austria) Ferdinand Habsburg (France) Charles Milesi	(France) Alpine Endurance Team	Alpine A424	6:00:38	6 Hours of Fuji	FIA World Endurance Championship	report

NOTE: The 2013 race did not start; all 17 laps were run under the Safety Car. A subsequent rule change was implemented to mandate two green flag laps before a race counted.

==== Records ====
===== Wins by constructor =====
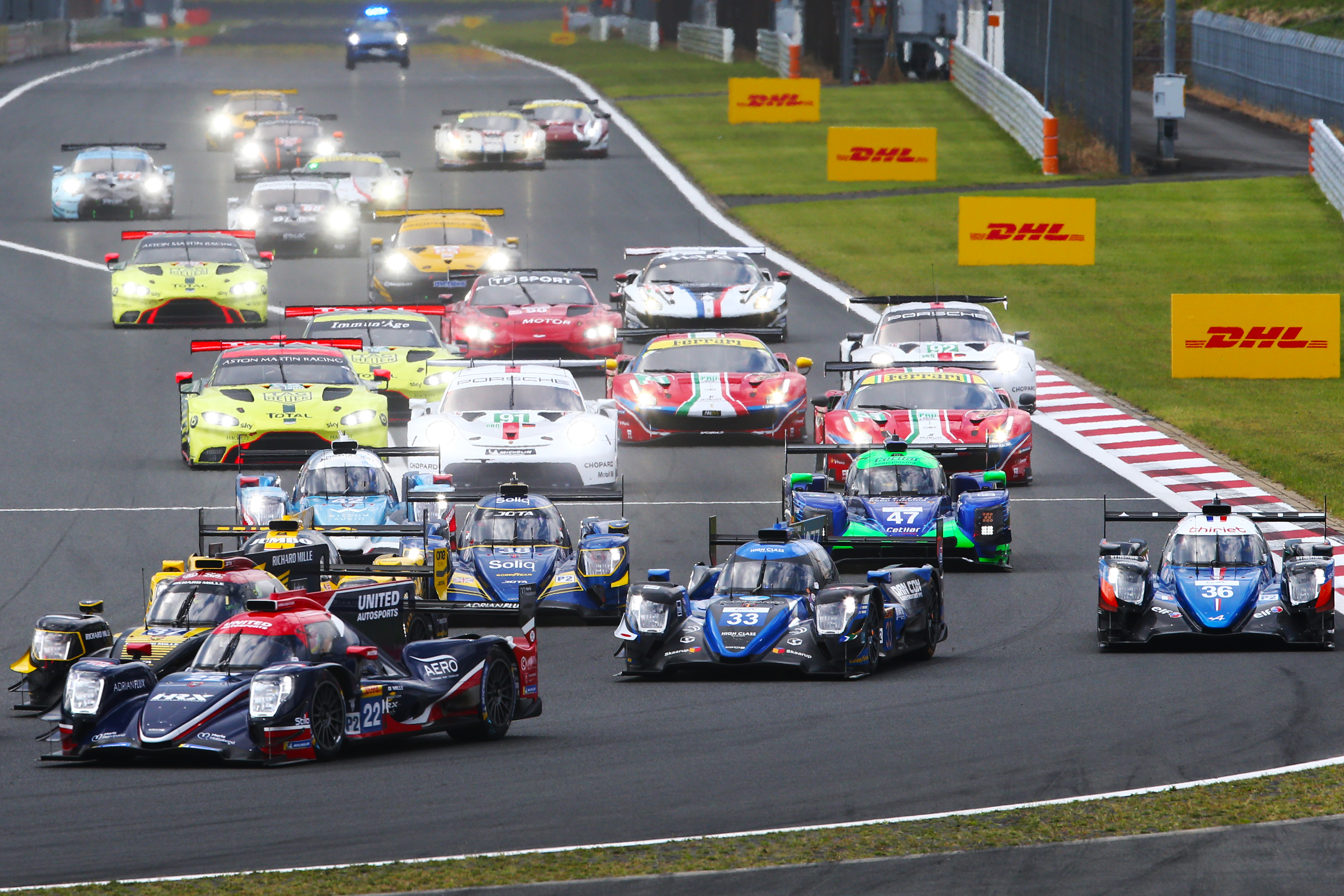
The start of the 2019 6 Hours of Fuji

Rank	Constructor	Wins	Years
1	(Japan) Toyota	16	1967–1969, 1972, 1973, 1987, 1990, 2012–2014, 2016–2019, 2022–2023
2	(Germany) Porsche	8	1971, 1983, 1985, 1986, 1988, 1989, 2015, 2024
3	(United Kingdom) March	5	1975–1978, 1981
4	(Japan) Nissan	4	1970, 1991, 1992, 1999
5	(United Kingdom) Chevron	3	1974, 1979, 1980
6	(Germany) BMW	1	1982
6	(Japan) Mazda	1	1984
6	(United Kingdom) Reynard	1	2007
6	(France) Alpine	1	2025

===== Wins by engine manufacturer =====
Rank	Engine supplier	Wins	Years
1	(Japan) Toyota	16	1967–1969, 1972, 1973, 1987, 1990, 2012–2014, 2016–2019, 2022–2023
2	(Germany) Porsche	8	1971, 1983, 1985, 1986, 1988, 1989, 2015, 2024
3	(Japan) Mazda	5	1977–1979, 1981, 1984
4	(Japan) Nissan	4	1970, 1991, 1992, 1999
4	(Germany) BMW	4	1975, 1976, 1980, 1982
6	(United States) Ford	1	1974
6	(United Kingdom) Gibson	1	2007
6	(France) Alpine	1	2025

===== Drivers with multiple wins =====
Rank	Driver	Wins	Years
1	(Japan) Hiroshi Fushida	4	1968, 1969, 1974, 1979
1	(Japan) Kazuki Nakajima	4	2012, 2013, 2017, 2019
1	(Switzerland) Sébastien Buemi	4	2014, 2017, 2019, 2022
4	(Japan) Fumiyasu Sato	3	1976, 1981, 1982
4	(Australia) Vern Schuppan	3	1983, 1985, 1989
4	(New Zealand) Brendon Hartley	3	2015, 2019, 2022
4	(United Kingdom) Mike Conway	3	2016, 2018, 2023
4	(Japan) Kamui Kobayashi	3	2016, 2018, 2023
9	(Japan) Yoshio Otsubo	2	1967, 1969
9	(Japan) Kunimitsu Takahashi	2	1970, 1986
9	(Japan) Kiyoshi Misaki	2	1972, 1973
9	(Japan) Nobuhide Tachi	2	1972, 1975
9	(Japan) Harukuni Takahashi	2	1973, 1974
9	(Japan) Tetsuji Ozasa	2	1976, 1981
9	(Japan) Yoshimi Katayama	2	1977, 1978
9	(Japan) Keiichi Suzuki	2	1980, 1985
9	(Japan) Naohiro Fujita	2	1981, 1983
9	(Japan) Naoki Nagasaka	2	1982, 1990
9	(Japan) Kazuyoshi Hoshino	2	1991, 1992
9	(Japan) Toshio Suzuki	2	1991, 1992
9	(Austria) Alexander Wurz	2	2012, 2013
9	(France) Nicolas Lapierre	2	2012, 2013
9	(United Kingdom) Anthony Davidson	2	2014, 2017
9	(Argentina) José María López	2	2018, 2023

=== WEC in Japan / Interchallenge Fuji ===
Year	Overall winner(s)	Entrant	Car	Distance/Duration	Race title	Championship	Report
1982	(Belgium) Jacky Ickx (West Germany) Jochen Mass	(West Germany) Rothmans Porsche	Porsche 956	6 hours	WEC in Japan	World Endurance Championship	report
1983	(West Germany) Stefan Bellof (United Kingdom) Derek Bell	(West Germany) Rothmans Porsche	Porsche 956	1,000 km (620 mi)	WEC in Japan	World Endurance Championship; All Japan Endurance Championship	report
1984	(West Germany) Stefan Bellof (United Kingdom) John Watson	(West Germany) Rothmans Porsche	Porsche 956	1,000 km (620 mi)	WEC in Japan	World Endurance Championship; All Japan Endurance Championship	report
1985	(Japan) Kazuyoshi Hoshino (Japan) Akira Hagiwara (Japan) Keiji Matsumoto	(Japan) Hoshino Racing	March 85G-Nissan	1,000 km (620 mi)^{A}	WEC Japan	World Endurance Championship; All Japan Endurance Championship	report
1986	(Italy) Paolo Barilla (Italy) Piercarlo Ghinzani	(West Germany) Joest Racing	Porsche 956B	1,000 km (620 mi)	WEC in Japan	World Sports Prototype Championship; All Japan Endurance Championship	report
1987	(Netherlands) Jan Lammers (United Kingdom) John Watson	(United Kingdom) Silk Cut Jaguar	Jaguar XJR-8	1,000 km (620 mi)	WEC in Japan	World Sports Prototype Championship; All Japan Sports Prototype Championship	report
1988	(United Kingdom) Martin Brundle (United States) Eddie Cheever	(United Kingdom) Silk Cut Jaguar	Jaguar XJR-9	1,000 km (620 mi)	Fuji 1000 Kilometres	World Sports Prototype Championship; All Japan Sports Prototype Championship	report
1989	(Japan) Hitoshi Ogawa (Italy) Paolo Barilla	(Japan) Toyota Team Tom's	Toyota 89C-V	1,000 km (620 mi)	Inter-Challenge Fuji 1000	All Japan Sports Prototype Championship	
1990	Cancelled due to bad weather						
1991	(Japan) Kazuyoshi Hoshino (Japan) Toshio Suzuki	(Japan) Nissan Motorsports	Nissan R91CP	1,000 km (620 mi)	Interchallenge Fuji 1000 km	All Japan Sports Prototype Championship	report
1992	(United Kingdom) Geoff Lees (Netherlands) Jan Lammers	(Japan) Toyota Team Tom's	Toyota TS010	1,000 km (620 mi)	Fuji 1000 Kilometres	All Japan Sports Prototype Championship	report

^A The 1985 race was stopped after 2 hours due to heavy rain. Most of the international entries withdrew before the race, or in the early laps.
