= 1977 World Sportscar Championship =

Racing tournament

1977 World Sportscar Championship season

Seasons
- ← 1976 1978 →

The 1977 World Sports Car Championship season was the 25th season of FIA World Sportscar Championship motor racing. It featured two separate World Championship series.

- The 1977 World Championship for Sports Cars, which was contested by Group 6 Two-Seater Racing Cars
- The 1977 World Championship for Makes, which was open to cars from various production-based categories including Group 5 Special Production Cars

In 1978 the World Championship of Makes would become the sole international series, while the cars used in the World Championship for Sports Cars would be used in the revival of the European Sportscar Championship. The European Championship was discontinued again at the end of the 1978 season.

== World Championship for Sports Cars ==
The 1977 World Championship for Sports Cars, which was restricted to Group 6 Two-Seater Racing Cars, was contested over an eight race series which ran from 17 April to 18 September 1977. The championship was won by Alfa Romeo.

=== Schedule ===
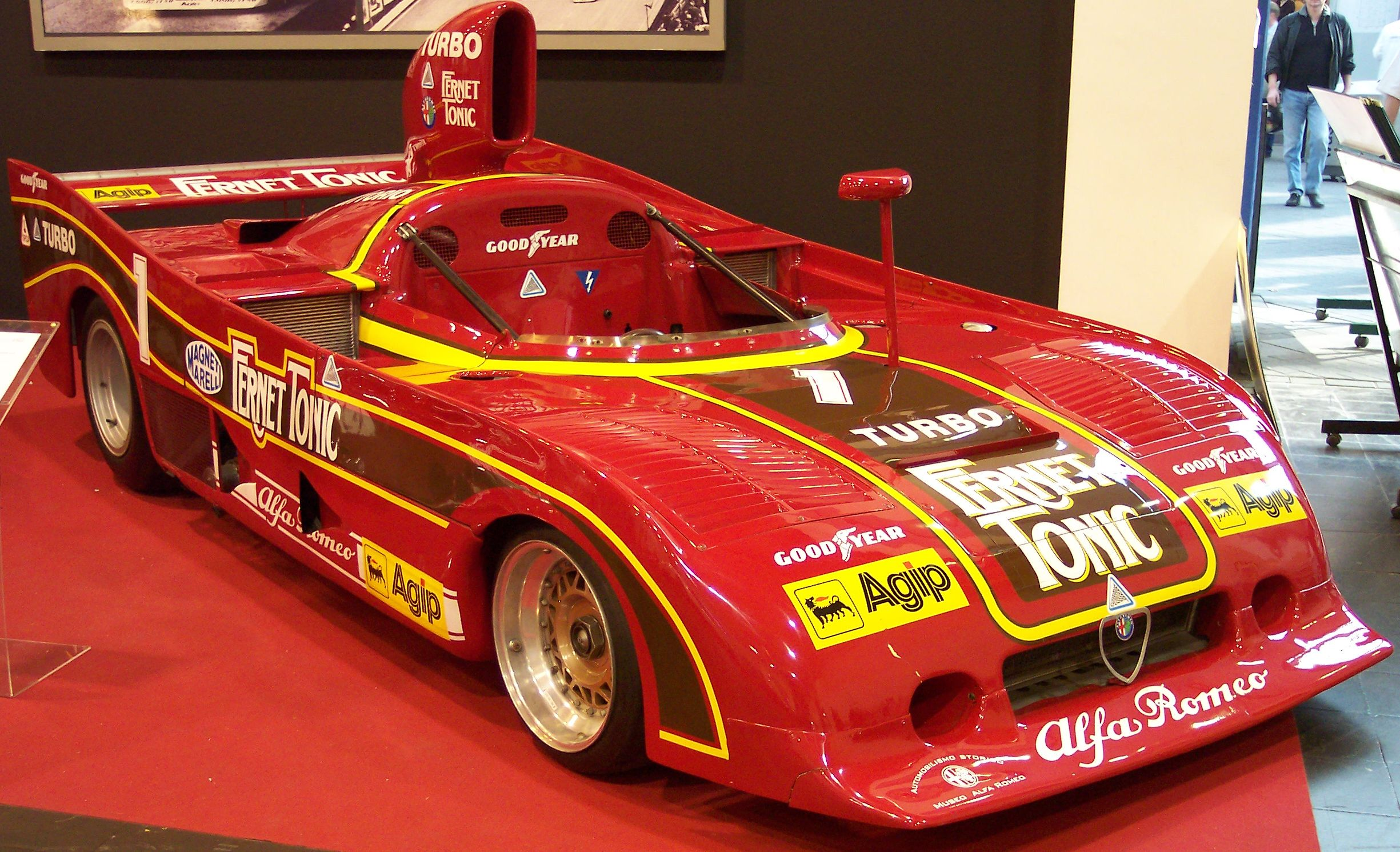
Alfa Romeo dominated the 1977 World Championship for Sports Cars with its 33SC12s

Rnd	Race	Circuit	Date
1	(France) 500 km de I'ACF	Dijon-Prenois	April 17
2	(Italy) Trofeo Filippo Caracciolo (500km)	Autodromo Nazionale Monza	April 24
3	(Italy) Trofeo Ignazio Giunti (400 km)	Vallelunga Circuit	June 2
4	(Italy) Coppa Florio (500 km)	Autodromo di Pergusa	June 19
5	(Portugal) Prémio International de Costa do Sol (2hr 30min)	Autódromo do Estoril	July 10
6	(France) 500 km Le Castellet	Circuit Paul Ricard	July 24
7	(Italy) 250 km Imola	Autodromo Dino Ferrari	September 4
8	(Austria) Elan Trophae (300 km)	Salzburgring	September 18

=== Race results ===
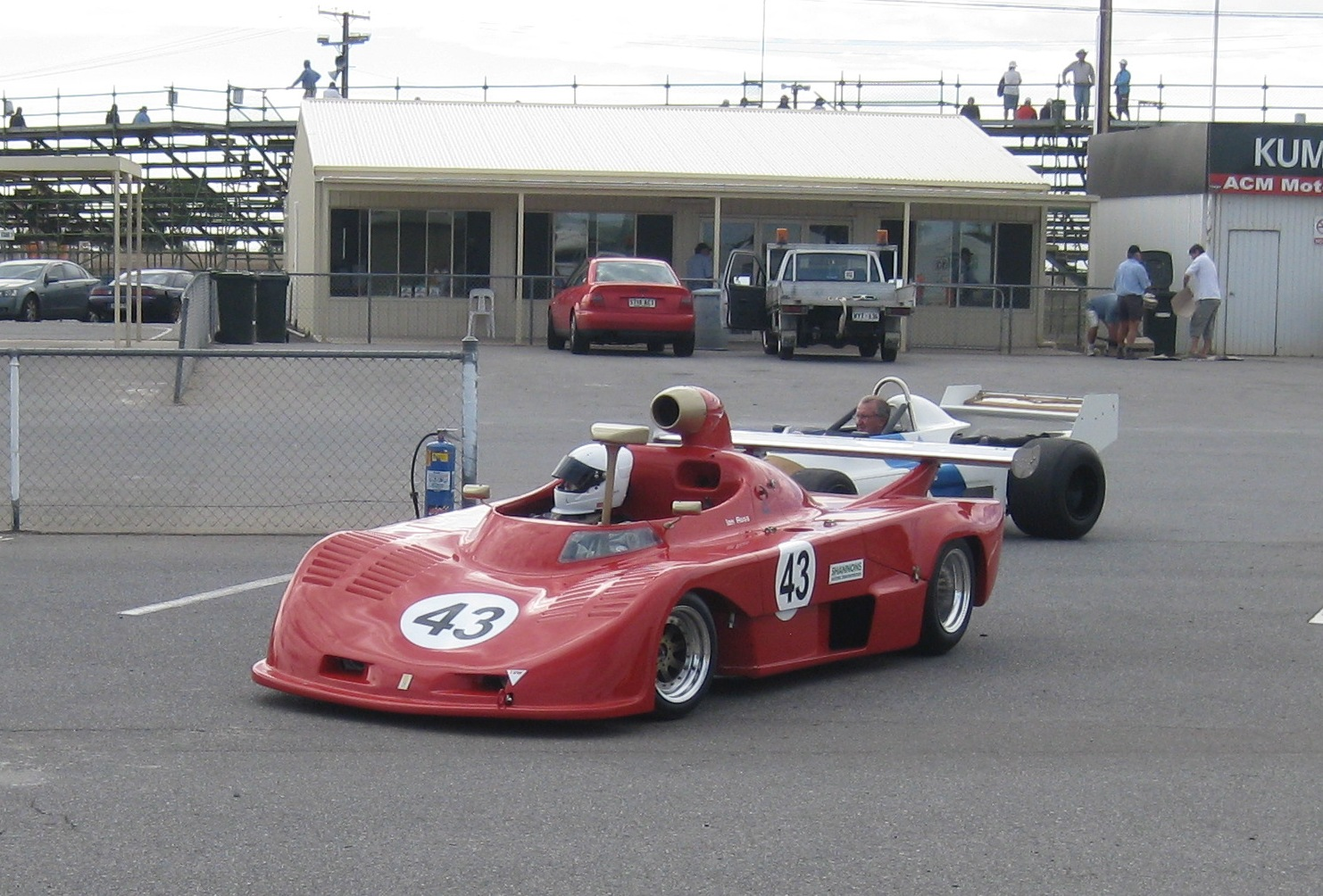
Osella placed second in the World Championship for Sports Cars with its PA5s

Rnd	Circuit	Overall Winning Team	Results
Rnd	Circuit	Overall Winning Drivers	Results
Rnd	Circuit	Overall Winning Car	Results
1	Dijon	(Italy) #1 Autodelta SpA	Results
1	Dijon	(Italy) Arturo Merzario (France) Jean-Pierre Jarier	Results
1	Dijon	Alfa Romeo 33SC12	Results
2	Monza	(Italy) #2 Autodelta SpA	Results
2	Monza	(Italy) Vittorio Brambilla	Results
2	Monza	Alfa Romeo 33SC12	Results
3	Vallelunga	(Italy) #2 Autodelta SpA	Results
3	Vallelunga	(Italy) Vittorio Brambilla	Results
3	Vallelunga	Alfa Romeo 33SC12	Results
4	Pergusa	(Italy) #1 Autodelta SpA	Results
4	Pergusa	(Italy) Arturo Merzario	Results
4	Pergusa	Alfa Romeo 33SC12	Results
5	Estoril	(Italy) #1 Autodelta SpA	Results
5	Estoril	(Italy) Arturo Merzario	Results
5	Estoril	Alfa Romeo 33SC12	Results
6	Paul Ricard	(Italy) #1 Autodelta SpA	Results
6	Paul Ricard	(Italy) Arturo Merzario (France) Jean-Pierre Jarier	Results
6	Paul Ricard	Alfa Romeo 33SC12	Results
7	Imola	(Italy) #2 Autodelta SpA	Results
7	Imola	(Italy) Vittorio Brambilla	Results
7	Imola	Alfa Romeo 33SC12	Results
8	Salzburgring	(Italy) #2 Autodelta SpA	Results
8	Salzburgring	(Italy) Vittorio Brambilla	Results
8	Salzburgring	Alfa Romeo 33SC12	Results

=== Points system ===
Points towards the 1977 World Championship for Sports Cars were awarded to each relevant car manufacturer for the first ten places in each race in the order of 20-15-12-10-8-6-4-3-2-1. Points were only awarded for the best placed car from each manufacturer at each race with no points given for places gained by other cars from the same manufacturer. Only the best six results counted towards each manufacturer’s championship total, with any other points earned not included. Discarded points are shown within brackets in the table below.

=== Championship results ===
Results of the 1977 World Championship for Sports Cars were as follows.

Pos	Manufacturer	Rd 1	Rd 2	Rd 3	Rd 4	Rd 5	Rd 6	Rd 7	Rd 8	Total
1	(Italy) Alfa Romeo	20	20	20	20	20	20	(20)	(20)	120
2	(Italy) Osella	15	15	12	12		4	15		73
3	(United Kingdom) Lola	12	4			10	6	6	10	48
4	(United Kingdom) Chevron	8	3	10			12	8		41
5	(Switzerland) Sauber				15	8	8			31
6	(Germany) TOJ						15			15
7	(Italy) AMS			4				10		14
8	(United Kingdom) McLaren		10					3		13
9	(United Kingdom) March								8	8

=== The cars ===
The following models contributed to the nett point scores of their respective manufacturers in the 1977 World Championship for Sports Cars.

- Alfa Romeo 33SC12
- Osella PA5 BMW & PA5 Ford
- Lola T294 Ford & T296 Ford
- Chevron B36 ROC Chrysler-Simca, B23 Ford, B31 Ford, B36 Ford, B31 Chrysler-Simca & B36 BMW
- Sauber C5 BMW
- TOJ SC302 Ford
- AMS 277 Fiat & 277 Ford
- McLaren M8F Chevrolet
- March 76S BMW

== World Championship for Makes ==
The 1977 World Championship for Makes was open to cars from various production-based categories including Group 5 Special Production Cars. The championship was won by Porsche.
