= Fuji Grand Champion Series =

Car racing series

The Fuji Grand Champion Series (富士グランドチャンピオンレース) ran from 1971 to 1989. It was a drivers' championship in Japan and was originally for 2 litre Group B6 cars. The series was started in 1971, and all races were held at the Fuji Speedway circuit.

== History ==
In its formative years, cars eligible to start included the March 74S, Alpine A441, Chevron, Lola and GRD.

In its fourth year of running, it had its first fatalities. At the start of the second race of the second round of the 1974 series, two cars were racing for the lead. They collided and Hiroshi Kazato and Seiichi Suzuki crashed into them, causing a fire. Both Kazato, 25, and Suzuki, 37, were killed. The race was immediately abandoned, and the circuit was reconstructed with the hairpin first corner that exists to this day, bypassing the banking.

A change in the rules in 1979 made it possible for single seat sports cars, similar to the revived Can-Am series, to race in the series.

In the second race of 1983 Famiyasu Sato was killed in practice. Later in the series, Toru Takahashi was killed when his car spun, and the aerodynamics of the car caused it to fly through the air, driver's head-first into the catch fencing, also killing a spectator. This led to a further change in the circuit where a chicane was added in 300R (the final corner) to slow the cars.

The maximum engine size limit was increased to 3 litres in 1987. In 1988, the series changed its name from Fuji Grand Champion series to Grand Champion series because some races added into the championship were not held at Fuji.

The late 1980s saw attendance dropping, and after 1989 the series folded.

== Revival ==
The series was revived again in 2002 as GC-21, like its predecessor; the series used Dallara GC21 cars, which were rebodied F3 cars powered by 3S-GTE engines. Like its predecessor, it raced exclusively at Fuji Speedway with the exception of 2004, when the circuit was undergoing a major renovation work. Despite running on a small field (usually five and six cars at a time), it ran on into 2006 when the series again folded. Between 2006 and 2007, it formed part of the LMP2 class in the Japan Le Mans Challenge.

== Champions ==
Year	Driver	Car
1971	(Japan) Tadashi Sakai	McLaren M12-Chevrolet
1972	(Japan) Hiroshi Fushida	Chevron B21P-Ford
1973	(Japan) Noritake Takahara	Lola T292-Ford; Chevron B2
1974	(Japan) Masahiro Hasemi	March 73S-BMW
1975	(Japan) Noritake Takahara	March 74S-BMW
1976	(Japan) Noritake Takahara	March 74S-BMW
1977	(Japan) Tetsu Ikuzawa	GRD S74-BMW
1978	(Japan) Kazuyoshi Hoshino	March 74S-BMW; Nova 53S-BMW
1979	(Japan) Satoru Nakajima	GRD S74-BMW; MCS Mazda
1980	(Japan) Masahiro Hasemi	MCS BMW
1981	(Japan) Naohiro Fujita	MCS BMW; March 802
1982	(Japan) Kazuyoshi Hoshino	MCS BMW
1983	(Japan) Keiji Matsumoto	MCS BMW
1984	(Japan) Kazuyoshi Hoshino	MCS BMW
1985	(Japan) Kazuyoshi Hoshino	MCS BMW
1986	(United Kingdom) Geoff Lees	MCS Yamaha
1987	(Japan) Kazuyoshi Hoshino	MCS Ford
1988	(United Kingdom) Geoff Lees	MCS Mugen
1989	(United Kingdom) Geoff Lees	MCS Mugen

== See also ==
- Fuji Long Distance Series
- 1999 Le Mans Fuji 1000 km
- Japan Le Mans Challenge

== Resources ==
- Fuji Grand Champion Series results
