= Osella PA5 =

Sports Prototype race car designed and built by Osella

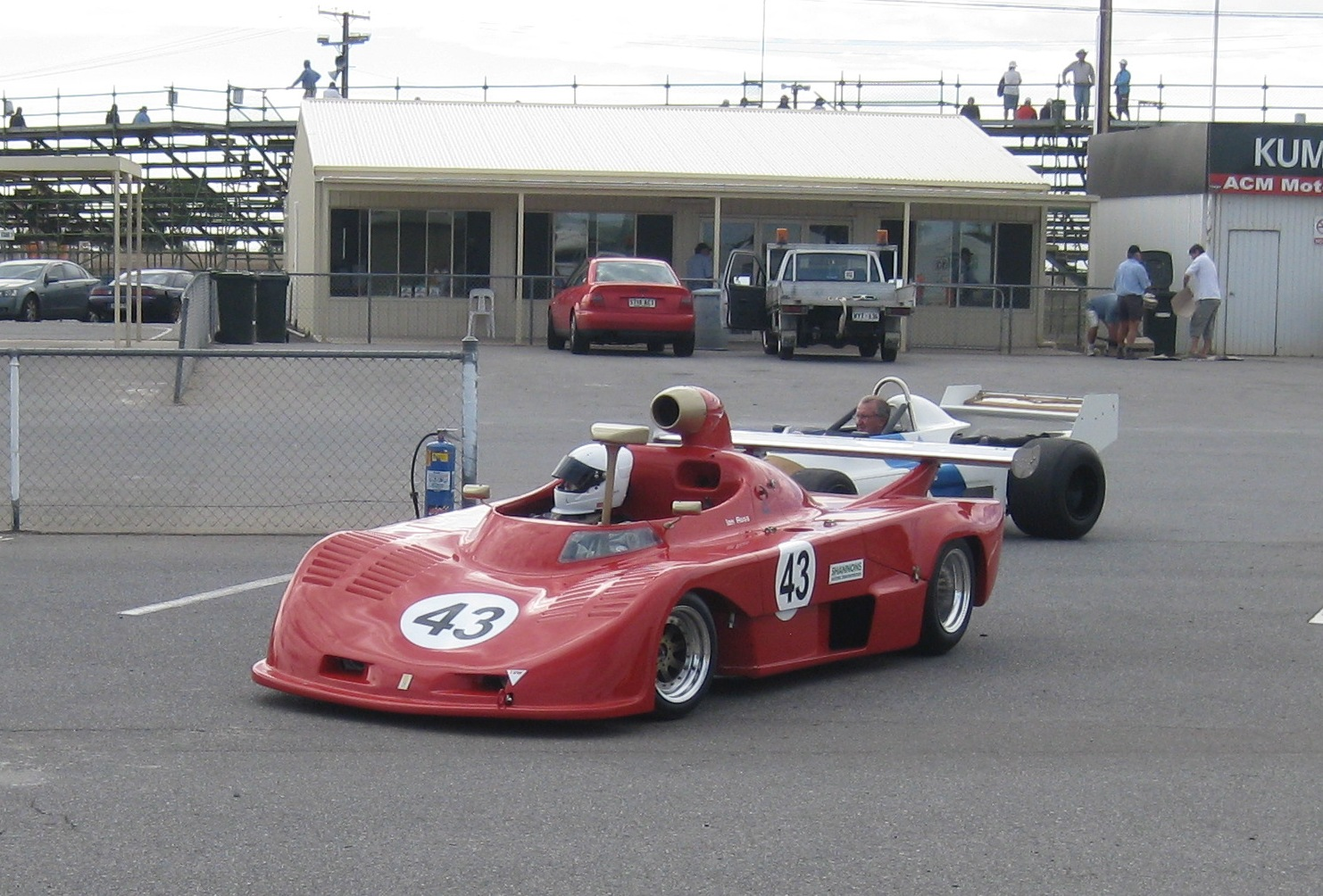
- Category: Group 6 (Sports 2000) prototype
- Designer(s): Osella
- Production: 1977-1981

Technical specifications
- Chassis: Fiberglass aluminum monocoque with steel tubular rear subframe
- Suspension (front): Double wishbones, Coil springs over Dampers, Anti-roll bar
- Suspension (rear): Single top links, twin lower links, Twin Radius arms, Coil springs over Dampers, Anti-roll bar
- Engine: BMW M12/7 turbo Cosworth BDG; Cosworth SCA; Cosworth FVA; Cosworth FVC; Hart 420R inline-four Ferrari V8, 1598-2000 cc
- Transmission: Hewland F.G.400 5-speed manual, rear wheel drive
- Weight: 1,300 lb (590 kg)

Competition history
Entries	Wins	Podiums
98	9	27

The Osella PA5 is a Group 6 (Sports 2000) prototype racing car designed, developed, and built by Osella, to compete in the World Sportscar Championship sports car racing series between 1977 and 1981. It was powered by a number of different engines, including the 2.0 L (120 cu in) BMW M12/7, Hart 420R, and the Cosworth BDG. The 1.6 L (98 cu in) and 1.8 L (110 cu in) Cosworth FVA and Cosworth FVC were also used. It was even powered by a Ferrari 2.0 V8 engine.
