= Chevron B31 =

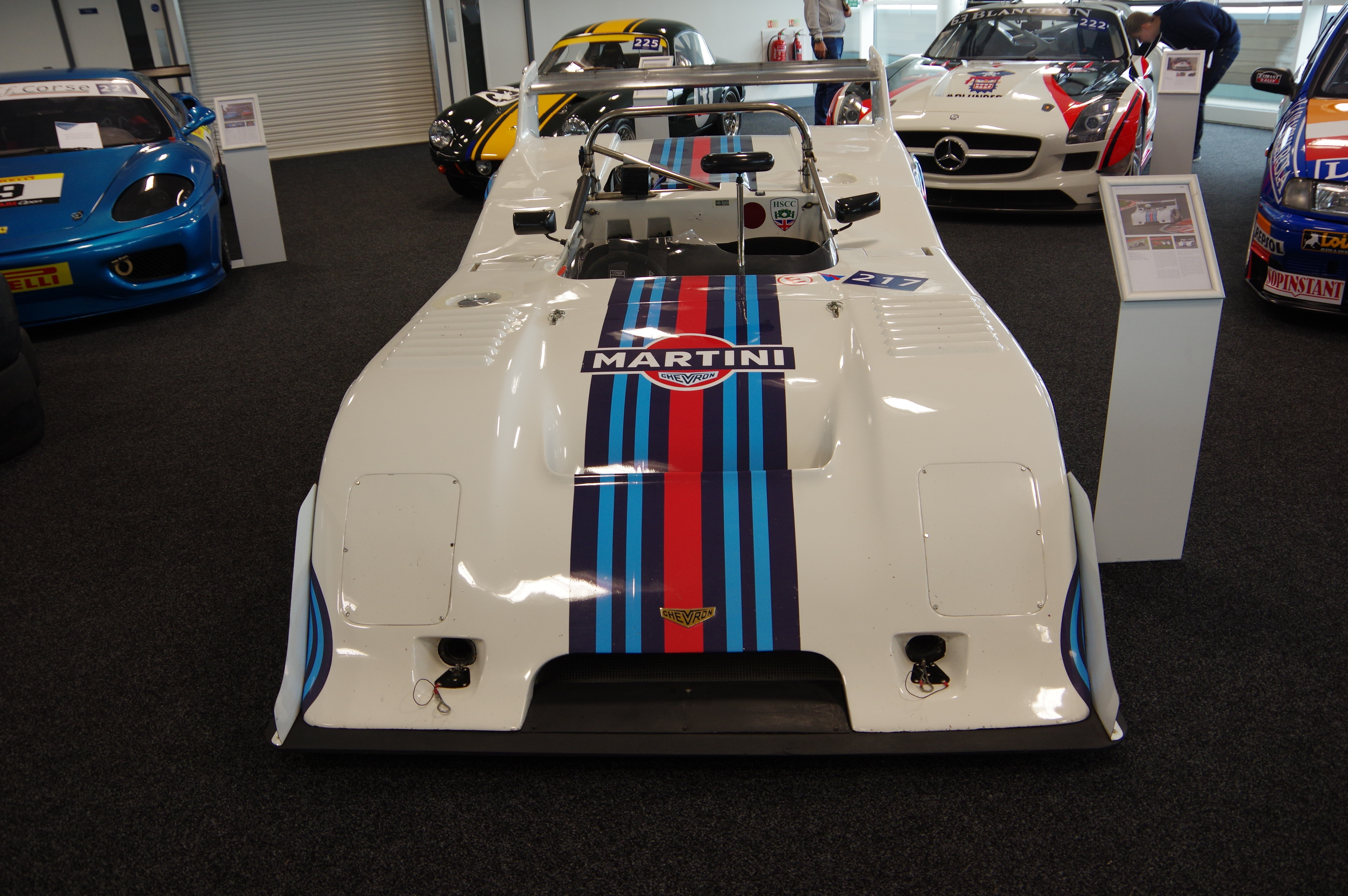
- Category: Group 6
- Constructor: Chevron Cars Ltd
- Designer: Derek Bennett
- Predecessor: Chevron B26
- Successor: Chevron B36

Technical specifications
- Chassis: fibreglass body on aluminium monocoque, front and rear subframes
- Suspension (front): double wishbones, coil springs over dampers, anti-roll bar
- Suspension (rear): single top links, twin lower links, twin trailing arms, coil springs over dampers, anti-roll bar
- Engine: Hart 420R 1,995 cc (121.7 cu in) naturally-aspirated I4 (original); many others were used throughout the car's career. mid-engined, longitudinally mounted
- Transmission: Hewland 5-speed manual
- Weight: 580 kg (1,279 lb)
- Tyres: Goodyear; Avon

Competition history
- Debut: 1975 1000 km of Mugello

The Chevron B31 was a sports prototype racing car built by Chevron Cars Ltd in 1975, and initially used in the European 2-Litre Championship. The car was an evolution of the Chevron B26, and was initially fitted with a 2-litre Hart 420R straight-four engine producing 290 hp (216.3 kW; 294.0 PS). However, various other engines were used; the car also ran with engines such as the 3-litre Cosworth DFV V8, the 2-litre Cosworth FVD/Cosworth BDG straight-four engines, and the 2-litre BMW M12 straight-four, amongst others.

== Design ==
The Chevron B31 was an evolution of the B26, and was designed for the European 2-Litre Championship by Chevron Cars Ltd's founder Derek Bennett in 1975; six cars were built. The B31 featured subtle changes, such as a slightly redesigned bodywork, but it featured the same basic aluminium monocoque chassis as its predecessor. The bodywork was made from fiberglass, and the B31 was designed to use the same Hart 420R engine as its predecessor had. The 420R was a naturally-aspirated 2-litre, 16 valve DOHC fuel-injected straight-four engine, with a maximum power output of 290 hp (216.3 kW; 294.0 PS) at 9500 rpm, and the power was transmitted to the rear wheels by a Hewland 5-speed manual transmission.

For the suspension, the B31 featured double wishbones, coil springs over dampers with an anti-roll bar at the front, and single top links, twin lower links, twin trailing arms, coil springs over dampers with an anti-roll bar at the rear. The brakes were ventilated discs all round, and the car had rack-and-pinion steering. As the car weighed 580 kg (1,279 lb), it had a power-to-weight ratio of exactly 0.5 hp/kg.

== Racing history ==
=== 1975–1982: International competition ===
==== 1975 ====
The B31 made its racing debut in 1975 at the 1000 km of Mugello, which was part of the World Championship for Makes; KVG Racing entered John Hine and Ian Grob in a B31, and Team Italiano Chevron also ran the new car, choosing Eris Tondelli and Mauro Nesti to drive it. Team Italiano Chevron, however, had the B31 fitted with a 1.3-litre Cosworth straight-four engine in place of the Hart 420R; thus, whilst the KVG Racing car was classified in the Sports 2000 category, the Team Italiano Chevron car was classified in the Sports 1300 category. Although the 1300cc car retired, KVG Racing won the Sports 2000 class, and finished fifth overall. The 1300cc car was then entered in the second round of the Campionato Italiano Group 5 Sport, held at Varano; "Bramen", its driver, was classified eighth in the Sports 1300 category. The car's next international event was the 800 km of Dijon, where KVG Racing were the only team to enter a B31; they took third overall, and the Sports 2000 class victory. At the 1000 km of Monza, Grob crashed his B31 in practice, leaving the car too damaged to compete in the race; instead, "Bramen" and Pasquale Anastasio were the only B31 drivers to compete in the race; they won the Sports 1300 class, and finished 13th overall. At the 1000 km of Spa, KVG Racing were once again the only entrants; this time, they finished third in the Sports 2000 class, and 14th overall. At the 1000 km of Pergusa, KVG Racing entered their car, whilst "Bramen" partnered Giancarlo Gagliardi in a 1.6-litre Cosworth FVA straight-four engined car that had been entered by Scuderia Citta dei Mille; although KVG Racing finished ninth overall and last (second in the Sports 2000 class), Scuderia Citta dei Mille won the Sports 1600 class (as they were the only entrant in that class to finish), and finished sixth overall. At the 1000 km of Nürburgring, both of the entered B31s featured Hart 420R engines; KVG Racing had entered one, as usual, but this time they were joined by Fisons Racing, who entered Martin Raymond and Tony Goodwin in their car. However, neither car had a successful race; the Fisons Racing car suffered an oil leak after 23 laps, and was forced to retire, whilst the KVG Racing car was classified eighth in the Sports 2000 class (26th overall), but suffered a throttle linkage failure after 30 laps, whilst leading its class. Four Hart 420R-engined B31s were entered in the European 2-Litre Championship (E2LC) opener, held at Brands Hatch; KVG Racing entered Hine and Grob in two separate cars, whilst Fisons Racing entered Raymond, and the fourth entrant did not show up. Although Raymond did not compete in the race, having blown his engine up, Hine won the first heat, and Grob finished fourth in that heat; in the second heat, Grob finished third, whilst Hine span, stalled, and was forced to retire. At the rain-shortened 1000 km of Zeltweg, Fisons Racing (now called Team Fisons) and KVG Racing both entered B31 Harts; the KVG Racing car blew its engine after nine laps, but the Team Fisons car finished 13th overall, and sixth in class. At the Hockenheim round of the E2LC, four B31 Harts were entered; KVG Racing entered Grob and Richard Lloyd, although the latter did not attend, whilst Team Fisons Racing entered Raymond, and Jörg Zaborowski entered as a privateer, but did not attend the race. Grob finished fourth in the first heat, whilst Raymond finished second; Grob's 21st in the second heat dropped him to 17th overall, but Raymond won the second heat, and won the event outright. This would prove to be the car's last major international event of the season, although Raymond did enter his B31 in the Interserie championship, as he had been doing throughout the season.

==== 1976 ====
The B31's first appearance of 1976 came in the 300 km of Nürburgring, which was the opening round of the World Sportscar Championship (WSC); although three cars were entered, neither finished the race, as Manrico Zanuso's B31 blew its 3-litre Cosworth DFV V8 engine before the start of the race, Tony Charnell crashed his 2-litre Cosworth FVC straight-four engined B31 out of the race, whilst Peter Smith and John Turner did not actually attend the race. For the 4 Hours of Monza, five B31s were entered; John Blanckley entered Zanuso and Raymond in a DFV-engined B31, Hay Seech entered Bob Marsland and Alois Müller in a Hart-engined B31, Anastasio partnered "Tambauto" in a 1.3-litre Cosworth-engined B31, Smith and Turner drove a 2-litre Cosworth-engined B31, and Claudio Francisci and Biaggio Cammarone drove another 1.3-litre Cosworth B31. However, the cars of Smith/Turner and Francisci/Cammarone did not attend the race, and neither of the other three B31s finished; the Hay Seech car blew its engine after 72 laps, the Anastasio/"Tambauto" car blew its engine after 64 laps, and the John Blanckley car suffered a cooling system failure after 28 laps. The third round of the WSC, which was the 500 km of Imola, saw only one B31 entered; Blanckley entered himself and Zanuso in a DFV-engined B31, but retired again, this time due to gearbox failure after 52 laps. For the Coppa Florio Pergusa, Francisci and Bruno Del Fante entered the only B31 of the event, a 1.3-litre Cosworth-engined car; the team failed to make the start of the race. At the 500 km of Dijon, Blanckley and Raymond drove their DFV-engined B31, but retired once again, after 105 laps. At the 200 miles of Salzburgring, it was a similar story; Zanuso and Blanckley retired the DFV-engined car due to a halfshaft failure. As this was the final round of the WSC season, it meant that no B31 had finished a race in the series; although B31s were used to win a non-championship race at Zolder, a, Interserie race at Zolder, and the Thruxton round of the British Sports Car Championship during the 1976 season.

==== 1977 ====
The 1977 World Sportscar Championship season started the same way that 1976 had gone. For the 500 km of Dijon, Tom Charnell and Ian Bracey drove a Hart 420R-engined B31, but retired due to a flywheel failure after 14 laps. For the 500 km of Monza, three B31s were entered: Martin Raymond and John Blanckley entered a DFV-engined car, Chandler Ibec International-Team Lloyds entered Bracey and Tony Charnell in the Hart-engined car, and Claudio Francisci partnered Giuseppe Fiaccadori in the remaining B31, which was fitted with a 1600cc Cosworth engine. For the first time since 1975, the B31 finished a WSC race; although Raymond and Blanckley did not attend, Francisci and Fiaccadori finished eighth overall, and fifth in the Sports 2000 class, whilst Bracey and Charnell finished immediately behind them, and won the Sports 1800 class. For the 400 km of Vallelunga, Francisci entered himself once more in the 1600cc Cosworth-engined B31, whilst Blanckley and Rolf Götz entered the DFV-engined car. Although Blanckley and Götz did not attend, Francisci finished fourth overall, and won the Sports 1600 class. A 2-litre Cosworth FVD-engined B31 was then entered by Chandler Ibec International-Team Lloyds at the 1977 24 Hours of Le Mans, the first time a B31 had been used in the endurance event. Charnell, Bracey and Robin Smith were selected to drive the car, but the team retired after 21 laps due to a fuel pump failure. Five B31s were entered in the 500 km of Le Castellet; Mogil Motors entered Charnell and Robin Smith in a 2-litre Cosworth FVC-engined car, whilst three 2-litre Chrysler-Simca straight-4 engined cars were entered (Michel Pignard, Michel Dubois and Jean-Louis Bos in one, Albert Dufréne and François Servanin in a second, and Jean-Pierre Jaussaud partnered Jacques Henry (F) in the other car) and Raymond entered himself and Götz in the DFV-engined car. Jassaud and Henry finished third overall, and won the Sports 2000 class, whilst Charnell and Smith finished right behind them, the two other Chrysler-Simca-engined cars retired, and the pairing of Raymond and Götz once again did not compete in the race. For the 250 km of Imola, Francisci partnered "Robin Hood" in a 1.6-litre Cosworth FVA-engined car, and Blanckley entered himself and Götz in the DFV car; although the latter pairing once again did not attend the race, "Robin Hood" and Francisci finished eleventh overall, and third in the Sports 1600 class.

==== 1978 ====
For 1978, the World Sportscar Championship had folded; as a result, the European Sportscar Championship (ESC) was introduced in its place. In the opening round of the ESC season, which was the 300 km of Nürburgring, Raymond drove his DFV-powered car to ninth place, and second in the Sports 2.0+ category. Four cars were entered at the next ESC race, which was the 320 km of Monza; however, three failed to qualify, and the one car that did, a Cosworth BDG-engined B31 driven by Robin Smith and Charnell, retired due to engine problems. Charnell and Smith were partnered by Fréderic Alliot and Richard Jones for the 24 Hours of Le Mans, but their race was strewn with problems, and the 181 laps they completed were insufficient for them to be classified. Secondo Ridolfi and Grassi were the only two to use a B31 at the Coppa Florio Pergusa, the fourth round of the ESC season, and they finished sixth. This was the car's best result all season in any championship.

==== 1979 ====
In 1979, the European Sportscar Championship folded, and the World Championship for Makes (WCM) replaced it. Nesti was the solitary B31 entry in the 6 Hours of Mugello, which was the second round of the WCM; however, he did not compete in the B31, instead driving a BMW 320i with Luigi Moreschi. Ridolfi partnered Roberto Marazzi in the 1000 km of Monza, which formed part of the Italian Group 6 Championship; they took their 1.6-litre Ford-engined car to fourth overall, and won the Sports 1600 category. Blanckley then attempted to enter the 1000 km of Nürburgring, but did not attend the race. Götz and Blanckley's next WCM entry was at the 6 Hours of Brands Hatch; once again, they did not actually compete in the event. The best B31 finish of the season came in July, when Götz took his BMW M12-engined car to second in the third round of the Interserie championship, held at Nürburgring.

==== 1980 ====
The B31 was still being entered into WCM events in 1980; Götz attempted to run himself and Roland Binder in the 1000 km of Monza, but did not compete. Götz and Blanckley then entered the 1000 km of Nürburgring, and brought their BMW-powered B31 home in 15th overall, and won the Sports 2000 category. The first seven laps also scored points for the Interserie championship; Götz was classified seventh at this point (and third in the Sports 2000 class), for what would prove to be the B31's best overall finish of the year. The last B31 entries of 1980 in the WCM came at the 6 Hours of Vallelunga, where two 1.6 litre Cosworth cars were entered; "Menes" and Franco Forini in one car, whilst Maurizio Gellini and Luigino Grassi drove the other. Neither would finish the race; as Gellini/Grassi retired after 108 laps, and "Menes"/Forini retired four laps later.

==== 1981 ====
By 1981, the B31 was being used less and less. Gellini partnered Ridolfi in a 1.6-litre Cosworth BDG-engined car at the 1000 km of Monza, but they lasted just nine laps before retiring. Jones and Barrie Williams then ran a 2-litre BDG-powered B31 at the 6 Hours of Silverstone, but the race was far from trouble-free, and the 141 laps that they completed were not enough to be classified. Götz, Binder and Blanckley initially entered a DFV-powered B31 in the 1000 km of Nürburgring, but instead Götz and Binder drove a Lola T296, whilst Blanckley drove a McLaren M8 Special. The B31's best finish of 1981 came at the sixth round of the Interserie championship, held at Nürburgring; Götz brought his DFV-engined car home in seventh overall, and fourth in the Sports 2000+ class.

=== 1982–1984: Interserie success ===
==== 1982 ====
In 1982, the B31 was not used in any World Endurance Championship (WEC) races; instead, it was used solely in the Interserie championship, and all bar one entry was from Götz. Despite the fact that the B31 was now seven years old, it was still fairly successful in the Interserie; Götz finished sixth overall, and second in Division II, at the opening round of the season, held at Nürburgring. A fifth overall, and fourth in Division II at the Österreichring followed, before Götz finished eighth and fifth overall (fourth and second in his division) in the next two Nürburgring races. Autodrom Most saw Rainer Rahardt attempt to enter, but not compete; however Götz finished fourth overall, and second in his division. Götz finished the season by taking fifth overall, and second in Division II, at Siegerland. Götz finished the Interserie season in fourth overall, with 67 points.

==== 1983 ====
In 1983, Götz was the only person to run a B31. He started his season by taking seventh overall in the fourth round of the Deutsche Rennsport Meisterschaft (DRM) series, held at Mainz-Finthen; he was the fastest of the three Group 6 entrants. Götz then took fourth overall, and third in Division II, at the opening round of the Interserie, held at the Österreichring. He would take seventh overall at Most, and fourth in his division, before following this with ninth and seventh overall in the two Siegerland races (second and third in his division.) Seventh at Hockenheim, and second in Division II, meant that Götz finished the 1983 Interserie season classified in third place, with 64 points; he was level with Binder on points, but had no class wins to Binder's three, and was classified behind him as a result.

==== 1984 ====
Now entering its ninth season, the venerable B31 was still Götz's car of choice for the Interserie. In the season opener, held at AVUS, Götz took third overall, and won Division II, for the car's best overall finish since 1979. He was slightly less competitive at the Österreichring, where he finished seventh overall, and fourth in his division; and he was unable to do better than 14th overall, and sixth in his division, at the Nürburgring. Götz then took another seventh overall, and fourth in his division, at Erding; however, this was followed by a successful race at Most, where he couldn't make the start of the race. The final round of the Interserie season, held again at the Nürburgring, was also unsuccessful; Götz could do no better than 16th, and seventh in Division II. He slipped to joint-sixth in the Driver's standings; level with Henri Pescarolo in a Porsche 956. Gotz switched to a March 832 for 1985, and the B31 would remain unused in that year, and 1986.

=== 1987–1990: Later career ===
==== 1987–1988 ====
After three years of inactivity, two B31s were entered in a non-championship race at Kyalami; Duckhams/All-Car entered Allan Quinn and Chad Wentzel in their car, whilst Giorgio Cavalieri and Ben Morgenrood drove a Mazda-powered B31. Although Quinn and Wentzel retired after 49 laps, Cavalieri and Morgenrood were able to bring their B31 home in 14th, and third in the Thundersport class. In 1988, Gérard MacQuillan entered himself and Williams in a 2-litre BMW M12-engined B31/36 in the fourth round of the BRDC C2 Championship, held at Oulton Park; they finished ninth, and last. Despite this, MacQuillan used the car again at Brands Hatch; he and Tony Lanfranchi finished fifth. MacQuillan and Williams would then enter the Silverstone round of the series, finishing eighth overall, and second in Class C.

==== 1989–1990 ====
MacQuillan and Williams entered two Thundersports races in their B31/36 at the start of the 1989 season; both ended in retirement. Despite this, they ran the car again in the Oulton Park round of the BRDC C2 Championship; they finished ninth. Two further races followed that year; seventh at Thruxton, before bearing problems prevented the pair from starting the race at Silverstone. One further entry in 1990 would follow, at the Donington Park round of the BRDC C2 Championship; this also resulted in a failure to start. After 15 years of competition, the B31 was finally retired, as it never competed again.
