= Chevron B26 =

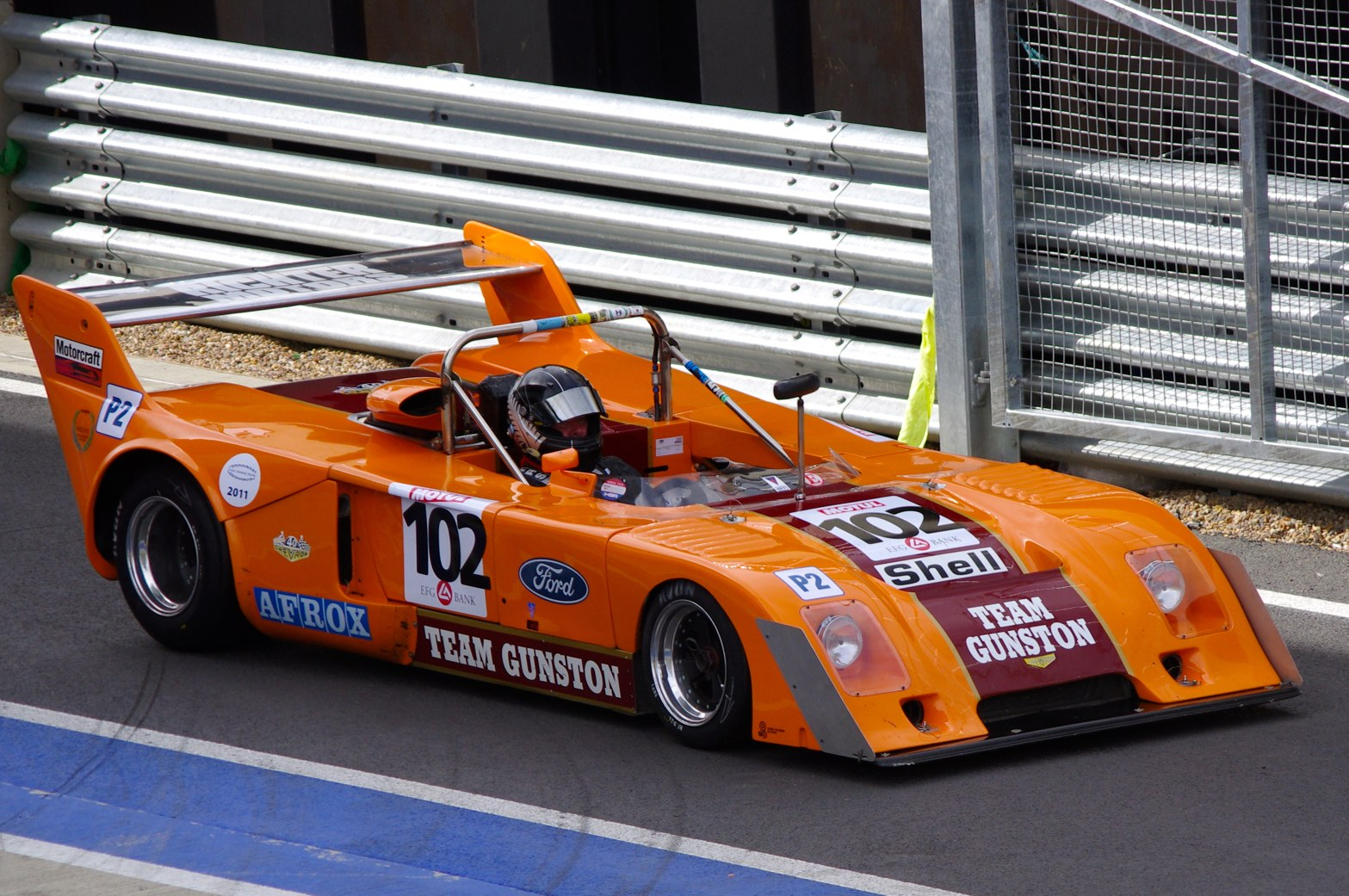
- Category: Group 6
- Constructor: Chevron
- Designer(s): Derek Bennett
- Production: 1973
- Predecessor: Chevron B23
- Successor: Chevron B31

Technical specifications
- Chassis: Aluminum monocoque covered in fiberglass body panels
- Suspension (front): Double wishbones, coil springs over dampers, anti-roll bar
- Suspension (rear): Lower wishbones, top links, twin trail arms, coil springs over dampers, anti-roll bar
- Engine: Mid-engine, longitudinally mounted, 2.0 L (122 cu in), Hart 420R, I4, NA
- Transmission: Hewland FT-200 5-speed manual
- Power: 285 hp (213 kW).

Competition history

The Chevron B26 is a 2-liter Group 6 sports prototype race car, designed, developed and built by British manufacturer Chevron, in 1973. Over its racing career, spanning 14 years, it won a total of 17 race wins (including 17 additional class wins), achieved 43 podium finishes, and clinched 9 pole positions. It was powered by a naturally-aspirated 2.0 L (120 cu in) Hart 420R four-cylinder engine, developing 285 hp (213 kW).
