= Mooncraft Special MCS 8 =

Japanese sports prototype race car

Mooncraft Special MCS 8 (MCS 8)
- Category: Fuji Grand Champion
- Constructor: Lola (originally)

Technical specifications
- Chassis: Carbon fiber composite honeycomb monocoque
- Suspension (front): independent unequal double wishbones, push-rod actuated coil springs over shock absorbers
- Suspension (rear): independent double wishbones, control links, push-rod actuated coil springs over shock absorbers, anti-roll bar
- Axle track: 66 in (1,676 mm) (front); 61.5 in (1,562 mm) (rear)
- Wheelbase: 100 in (2,540 mm)
- Engine: Mugen MF308 3.0 L (183 cu in) DOHC V8 naturally-aspirated mid-engined
- Torque: 276 lb⋅ft (374 N⋅m) @ 6,900 rpm
- Transmission: 5-speed manual
- Power: 450 hp (336 kW) @ 9,000 rpm
- Weight: 540 kg (1,190 lb) (including driver)
- Tyres: Yokohama; Dunlop

Competition history

The Mooncraft Special MCS 8, also known simply as the MCS 8, was a Japanese sports prototype race car, used in the Fuji Grand Champion Series, between 1988 and 1989. Based on both the Lola T87/50, and later Lola T88/50 Formula 3000 cars, it was powered by a 3.0 L (180 cu in) Mugen MF308 V8 engine, and ran on either Bridgestone or Dunlop tires.
