= 1989 Fuji Long Distance Series season =

1989 Fuji Long Distance Series

Seasons
- ← 1988 1990 →

The 1989 Fuji Long Distance Series was the 13th season of this series, with all races being held at the Fuji International Speedway.

== Fuji Long Distance ==
=== Results ===
Date	Round	Race	Winning drivers	Winning team	Winning car
12/03/89	1	All Japan Fuji 500 km	(Japan) Akihiko Nakaya (West Germany) Harald Grohs	(Japan) From A Racing	Porsche 962C
30/04/89	2	JAF Grand Prix All Japan Fuji 1000 km	(Australia) Vern Schuppan (Sweden) Eje Elgh (Japan) Keiji Matsumoto	(Australia) Omron Racing Team	Porsche 962C
23/07/89	3	All Japan Fuji 500 Miles	(Japan) Hideki Okada (Japan) Masanori Sekiya	(Japan) Leyton House Racing Team	Porsche 962 CK6
08/10/89	4	Interchallenge Fuji 1000 km	(Japan) Hitoshi Ogawa (Italy) Paolo Barilla	(Japan) Toyota Team TOM'S	Toyota 89CV
