= Mooncraft Special MCS 9 =

Mooncraft Special MCS 9 (Reynard 89DGC)
- Category: Fuji Grand Champion
- Constructor: Reynard or Lola (originally)

Technical specifications
- Chassis: Carbon fiber composite honeycomb monocoque
- Suspension (front): independent unequal double wishbones, push-rod actuated coil springs over shock absorbers
- Suspension (rear): independent double wishbones, control links, push-rod actuated coil springs over shock absorbers, anti-roll bar
- Axle track: 66 in (1,676 mm) (front); 61.5 in (1,562 mm) (rear)
- Wheelbase: 105 in (2,667 mm)
- Engine: Mugen MF308 3.0 L (183 cu in) DOHC V8 naturally-aspirated mid-engined
- Torque: 276 lb⋅ft (374 N⋅m) @ 6,900 rpm
- Transmission: 5-speed manual
- Power: 450 hp (336 kW) @ 9,000 rpm
- Weight: 540 kg (1,190 lb) (including driver)
- Tyres: Yokohama; Dunlop

Competition history

The Mooncraft Special MCS 9, also known as the Reynard 89DGC (with the 'GC' suffix standing for Grand Champion), was a Japanese sports prototype race car, used in the Fuji Grand Champion Series, between 1988 and 1989. Based on either the Reynard 89D, or the Lola T88/50 Formula 3000 cars, it was powered by a 3.0 L (180 cu in) Mugen MF308 V8 engine, and ran on either Bridgestone or Dunlop tires.
