= Toru Takahashi (racing driver) =

Japanese racing driver

Toru Takahashi 高橋徹
- Nationality: (Japan) Japanese
- Born: October 6, 1960 Higashihiroshima, Japan
- Died: October 23, 1983 (aged 23) Fuji Speedway, Oyama, Japan

Japanese Formula 2
- Years active: 1983
- Teams: Heroes Racing Corporation
- Starts: 7
- Wins: 0
- Poles: 1
- Fastest laps: 0
- Best finish: 5th in 1983

Previous series
- 1983 1982: Grand Champion Series; Japanese Formula 3

Toru Takahashi (高橋徹, Takahashi Tōru; 6 October 1960 – 23 October 1983) was a Japanese racing driver.

== Career ==
Toru Takahashi was born in Higashihiroshima, Hiroshima Prefecture, Japan. In 1982, he was runner-up in Japanese Formula 3. The following year, he ran a dual campaign, racing in the Grand Champion Series and also stepping up to Japanese Formula 2 (now Super Formula).

Takahashi was killed in the fourth and final round of the Grand Champion Series race at Fuji Speedway, Japan, in 1983, at the age of 23. Exiting the high-speed Last Corner at around 140mph, his BMW lifted and flew off the track, hitting a catch fence and killing a female spectator. The race was suspended with a red flag. As the race had not completed three laps, the results of the first two laps of the 60 lap race were nullified for the restart, and as a result, Takahashi was declared a non-starting entrant since only those who started the restarted race could be declared starters. A chicane was installed in the final turn, and Hermann Tilke demolished the section in 2003 as part of a total circuit reconstruction.

Takahashi's final position in the 1983 Japanese Formula 2 season was fifth, with 49 points.

== Racing record ==
=== Japanese Top Formula Championship results ===
(key) (Races in bold indicate pole position) (Races in italics indicate fastest lap)

Year	Entrant	1	2	3	4	5	6	7	8	DC	Points
1983	Heroes Racing	SUZ; 2	FUJ; Ret	MIN; 5	**SUZ**; 3	SUZ; Ret	FUJ; 4	SUZ; 6	SUZ	5th	49
