= 1990 Fuji 1000km =

Motor racing event

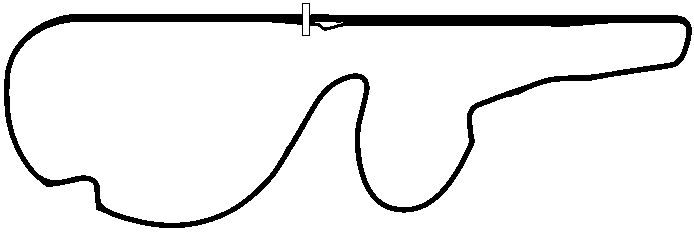
Layout of the Fuji Speedway (1987–2003)

The All Japan Fuji 1000 km, was the sixth round of the 1990 All Japan Sports Prototype Championship and the fourth round of the 1990 Fuji Long Distance Series which was held at the Fuji International Speedway, on October 7, in front of a crowd of approximately 41,000.

== Report ==
=== Entry ===
A total of 19 cars were entered for the event, in two classes, one for cars running to Group C1 specification and the other to IMSA GTP regulations.

=== Qualifying ===
The Nissan Motorsport car of Anders Olofsson and Masahiro Hasemi took pole position, in their Nissan R90CP ahead of teammates Kazuyoshi Hoshino and Toshio Suzuki, by 0.428secs.

=== Race ===
The race was held over 224 laps of the Fuji circuit, a distance of 1000 km (actual distance was 1001.28 km). Roland Ratzenberger, and Naoki Nagasaka took the winner spoils for the Toyota Team SARD, driving their Toyota 89C-V. They won with a time of 5hr 57:15.832mins., averaging a speed of 168.158 km/h (104.489 mph). Second place went to Kazuyoshi Hoshino and Toshio Suzuki in the pole sitting Nissan Motorsport's Nissan R90CP who finished about 1 minute and 18 seconds adrift. Five laps down, in third place was the Alpha Racing Porsche 962 C of Stanley Dickens and Will Hoy.

== Classification ==
=== Result ===
Class Winners are in Bold text.

Pos.	No.	Class	Drivers			Entrant	Car - Engine	Time, Laps	Reason Out
1st	**39**	**C1**	**(Austria) Roland Ratzenberger**	**(Japan) Naoki Nagasaka**		**Toyota Team SARD**	**Toyota 89C-V**	5:57:15.832	
2nd	23	C1	(Japan) Kazuyoshi Hoshino	(Japan) Toshio Suzuki		Nissan Motorsports	Nissan R90CP	5:58:34.540	
3rd	2	C1	(Sweden) Stanley Dickens	(United Kingdom) Will Hoy		Alpha Racing	Porsche 962C	219	
4th	55	C1	(Sweden) Eje Elgh	(Australia) Tomas Mezera		Omron Racing Team	Porsche 962C	214	
5th	24	C1	(Japan) Masahiro Hasemi	(Sweden) Anders Olofsson		Nissan Motorsports	Nissan R90CP	214	
6th	**203**	**GTP**	(Brazil) **Maurizio Sandro Sala**	(Japan) **Yoshimi Katayama**		**Mazdaspeed**	**Mazda 767B**	**211**	
7th	201	GTP	(Republic of Ireland) David Kennedy	(Belgium) Pierre Dieudonné		Mazdaspeed	Mazda 787	208	
DNF	37	C1	(France) Pierre-Henri Raphanel	(Japan) Masanori Sekiya	(Japan) Hitoshi Ogawa	Toyota Team Tom's	Toyota 90C-V	189	Transmission
9th	230	GTP	(Japan) Tetsuji Shiratori	(Japan) Syuuji Fujii		Pleasure Racing	Mazda 757B	183	
DNF	7	C1	(United Kingdom) Tiff Needell	(United Kingdom) Derek Bell	(United Kingdom) Anthony Reid	The Alpha Racing	Porsche 962C	167	Suspension
DNF	1	C1	(Japan) Kunimitsu Takahashi	(Japan) Kazuo Mogi		Advan Alpha Nova	Porsche 962C	124	Accident
DNF	33	C1	(United Kingdom) Johnny Herbert	(Sweden) Rickard Rydell		Takefuji Racing Team	Porsche 962C	110	Accident
DNF	27	C1	(Japan) Akihiko Nakaya	(Germany) Volker Weidler	(Japan) Yukihiro Hane	From A Racing	Porsche 962C	98	Accident
DNF	85	C1	(Japan) Takao Wada	(Japan) Osamu Nakako		Cabin Racing Team With Team Le Mans	Nissan R90V	97	Transmission
DNF	202	GTP	(Japan) Yojiro Terada	(Japan) Takashi Yorino		Mazdaspeed	Mazda 787	39	Transmission
DNF	88	C1	(Japan) Jirou Yoneyama	(Japan) Hisatoyo Goto	(Japan) Hideo Fukuyama	British Barn Racing Team	British Barn BB90R	36	Electrics
DNF	100	C1	(South Africa) George Fouché	(Sweden) Steven Andskär		Trust Racing Team	Porsche 962C	20	Engine
DNF	36	C1	(Japan) Hitoshi Ogawa	(Japan) Keiichi Suzuki	(Japan) Takuya Kurosawa	Toyota Team Tom's	Toyota 89C-V	10	Engine
DSQ	240	GTP	(Japan) "Nogami"	(Japan) Kazuhiko Oda	(Japan) Keiichi Mizutani	Lenox Racing	Mazda 757	?	Engine repair with outside assistance

- Fastest lap: Masahiro Hasemi/Anders Olofsson, 1:16:728secs.
