= Fuji Long Distance Series =

- Category: Sportscar, touring cars
- Country: Japan
- Inaugural season: 1977
- Folded: 1992

The Fuji Long Distance Series (富士ロングディスタンスシリーズ, Fuji rongudisutansu shirīzu) was a Japanese endurance championship which took place mainly at Fuji International Speedway.

The series began in 1977 and until 1984 was an independent championship with three rounds, all held at Fuji. In the first two seasons the series was contested by Group 6 two-seater racing cars, with some touring cars filling the grid. The Group 6 sportscars were soon replaced by Group 5 silhouettes and 1983 saw the introduction of Group C and IMSA GTP sports prototypes cars. In 1985 the three Fuji races were incorporated into All Japan Endurance Championship who already had a Fuji round known as WEC in Japan. As a result, between 1985 and 1990 the Fuji Long Distance Series title was awarded counting the four Fuji rounds from the merged championship.

By 1991 the series was renamed Long Distance Series and counted all races from the All Japan championship, however the series ended after the 1992 season, when the JAF dissolved the All Japan Sports Prototype Championship, ending Group C racing in Japan.

The Fuji Long Distance Series was sanctioned by FISCO Club (currently known as Fuji Motorsports Club) and, as a championship of entrants, the titles were awarded to teams.

== Champions ==
Season	Winning team
1977	(Japan) Katayama Racing
1978	(Japan) Katayama Racing
1979	(Japan) Advan Racing Team
1980	(Japan) Speed Star Wheel Racing Team
1981	(Japan) Kinomi Racing
1982	(Japan) Auto Beaurex Motor Sports
1983	(Japan) Trust Racing Team
1984	(Japan) Trust Racing Team
1985	(Japan) Advan Sports Nova
1986	(Japan) Advan Sports Nova
1987	(Japan) Advan Alpha Nova
1988	(Japan) From A Racing
1989	(Australia) Omron Racing Team
1990	(Japan) Nissan Motorsports
1991	(Japan) Nissan Motorsports
1992	LD1: (Japan) Toyota Team TOM'S
1992	LD2: (Japan) Nissan Motorsports

== See also ==
- Fuji Grand Champion Series
- 1999 Le Mans Fuji 1000 km
- Japan Le Mans Challenge
