= 1989 Fuji 1000km =

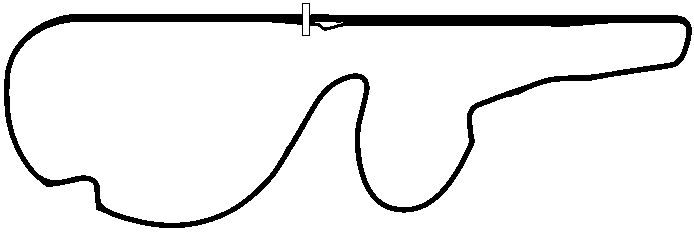
Layout of the Fuji Speedway (1987–2003)

The JAF Grand Prix All Japan Fuji 1000 km, was the second round of both the 1989 All Japan Sports Prototype Championship and the 1989 Fuji Long Distance Series was held at the Fuji International Speedway, on the 30 April, in front of a crowd of approximately 58,000.

== Report ==
=== Entry ===
A total of 17 cars were entered for the event, in two classes, one for cars running to Group C1 specification and the other to IMSA GTP regulations.

=== Qualifying ===
The Nissan Motorsport car of Anders Olofsson and Masahiro Hasemi took pole position, in their Nissan R88C ahead of teammates Kazuyoshi Hoshino and Toshio Suzuki, by only 0.269secs.

=== Race ===
The race was held over 224 laps of the Fuji circuit, a distance of 1000 km (actual distance was 1001.28 km). Vern Schuppan, Eje Elgh and Keiji Matsumoto took the winner spoils for the Omron Racing Team, driving their Porsche 962C. The trio won in a time of 5hr 30:36.816mins., averaging a speed of 133.571 mph. Second place went to George Fouché and Steven Andskär in the Trust Racing Team's Porsche 962GTi who finished about 15 seconds adrift. Coming in third was the pole winning Nissan of Olofsson and Hasemi. They finished 1 lap behind the winners.

== Classification ==
=== Result ===
Class Winners are in Bold text.

Pos.	No.	Class	Drivers			Entrant	Car - Engine	Time, Laps	Reason Out
1st	**55**	**C1**	**(Australia) Vern Schuppan**	**(Sweden) Eje Elgh**	**(Japan) Keiji Matsumoto**	**Omron RacingTeam**	**Porsche 962C**	5:30:36.816	
2nd	100	C1	(South Africa) George Fouché	(Sweden) Steven Andskär		Trust Racing Team	Porsche 962GTi	5:30:51.215	
3rd	24	C1	(Sweden) Anders Olofsson	(Japan) Masahiro Hasemi		Nissan Motorsport	Nissan R88C	223	
4th	25	C1	(Japan) Kunimitsu Takahashi	(Sweden) Stanley Dickens		Advan Alpha Nova	Porsche 962C	223	
5th	16	C1	(Japan) Masanori Sekiya	(Japan) Hideki Okada		Leyton House Racing Team	Porsche 962CK6	220	
6th	23	C1	(Japan) Kazuyoshi Hoshino	(Japan) Toshio Suzuki		Nissan Motorsport	Nissan R88C	214	
7th	85	C1	(Japan) Takao Wada	(Japan) Akio Morimoto		Cabin Racing Team with Team Le Mans	March-Nissan 88	212	
8th	36	C1	(England) Geoff Lees	(Japan) Hitoshi Ogawa		Toyota team TOM’S	Toyota 89C-V	211	
9th	**202**	**GTP**	**(Japan) Yoshimi Katayama**	**(Japan) Yojiro Terada**	**(Japan) Takashi Yorino**	**Mazdaspeed**	**Mazda 767B**	205	
10th	50	C1	(Austria) Roland Ratzenberger	(Japan) Keiichi Suzuki	(Japan) Kouji Satou	Tenoras Toyota SARD Racing Team	Toyota 89C-V	205	
11th	240	GTP	(Japan) Toshihiko Nogami	(Japan) Syuuji Kasuya	(Japan) Yoshiyuki Ogura	Katayama Racing	Mazda 757	197	
12th	230	GTP	(Japan) Tetsuji Shiratori	(Japan) Syuuji Fujii	(Japan) Seisaku Suzuki	Shizumats Racing	Mazda 757	195	
13th	26	C1	(Japan) Kazuo Mogi	(Japan) Kenji Takahashi		Advan Alpha Tomei	Porsche 962C	190	
DNF	7	C1	(Argentina) Oscar Larruari	(Brazil) Maurizio Sandro Sala		The Alpha Racing with Brun	Porsche 962C	76	Turbocharger
DNF	27	C1	(Japan) Akihiko Nakaya	(Germany) Harald Grohs		From A Racing	Porsche 962C	31	Engine
DNF	22	C1	(Japan) Naoki Nagasaka	(Japan) Chiyomi Totani		Alpha Cubic Racing Team	Porsche 962CK6	27	Differential
DNF	88	C1	(Japan) Kiyoshi Misaki	(Japan) Jirou Yoneyama	(Japan) Hideo Fukuyama	British Barn Racing Team	BB-Ford 89R	12	Engine

- Fastest lap: Geoff Lees/Hitoshi Ogawa, 1:21:418secs. (112.98 mph)
