= Mazda Savanna =

The Mazda Savanna is a rotary-powered automobile sold by the Japanese manufacturer Mazda between 1971 and 1978. Between 1978 and 1991, spanning two generations, Mazda sold the Savanna replacement as the Mazda Savanna RX-7. Mazda exclusively used the Savanna nameplate in Japan. It was exported as the Mazda RX-3 in its first generation from 1971 to 1978, and as the Mazda RX-7 in its subsequent generations.

For the original 1971 version of Savanna, Mazda fitted its 10A rotary engine to the Mazda Grand Familia to create a separately marketed product sold in coupé, sedan, and station wagon guises. The engine was upgraded to the larger 12A rotary in the GT model introduced in September 1972, and eventually this became the standard engine across the entire range. Coupé sales accounted for over half of total sales, influencing the design and marketing of the second generation of Savanna. The subsequent two generations, released in 1978 and 1985 respectively, fitted the rotary engines to a unique coupe body that sold internationally as the Mazda RX-7.

The rotary engine had financial advantages to Japanese consumers in that the engine displacement remained below 1.5 litres, a significant determination when paying the Japanese annual road tax which kept the obligation affordable to most buyers, while having more power than the traditional inline engines.

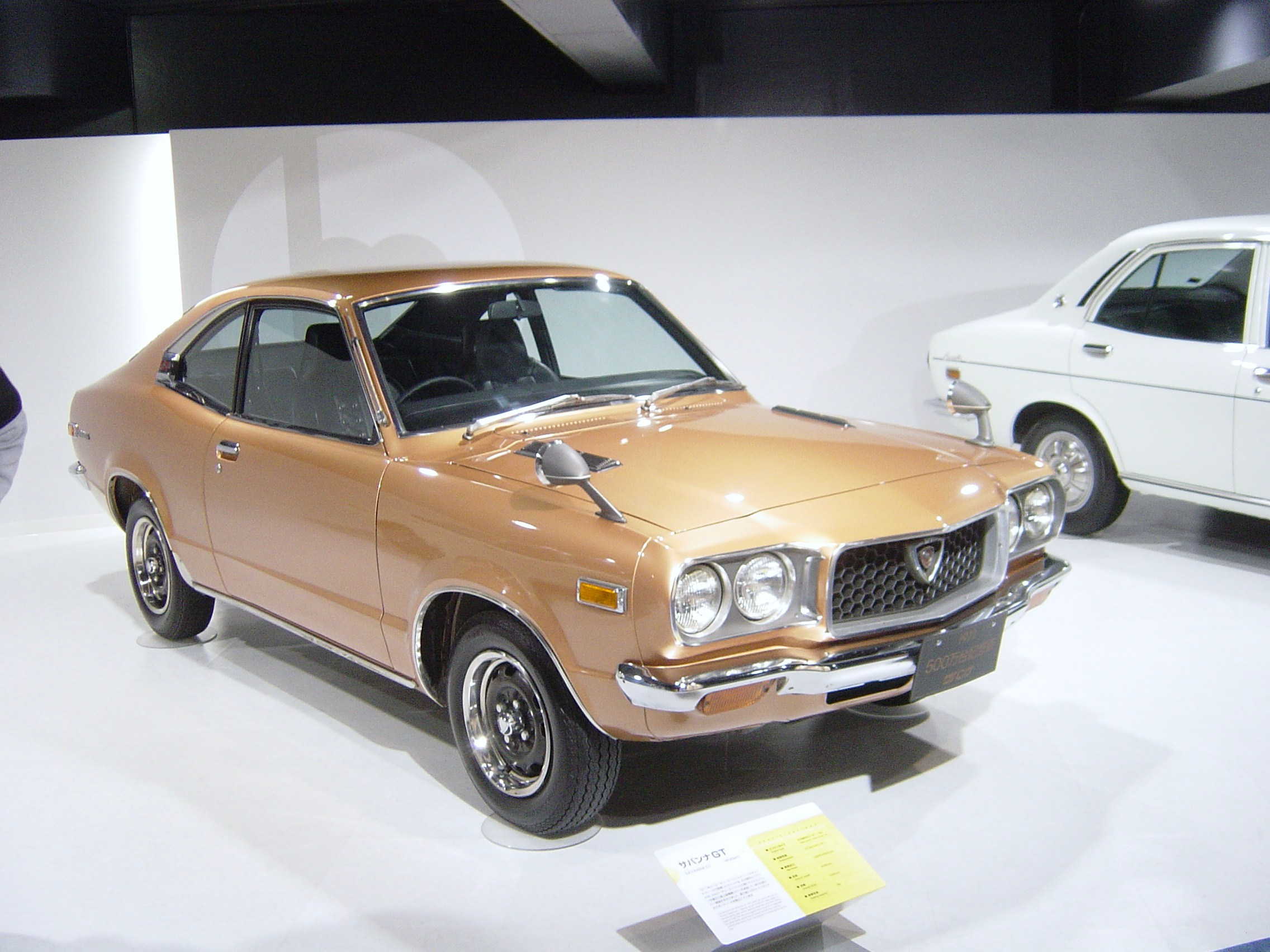
First generation (S102A/S124A; 1971–1978)

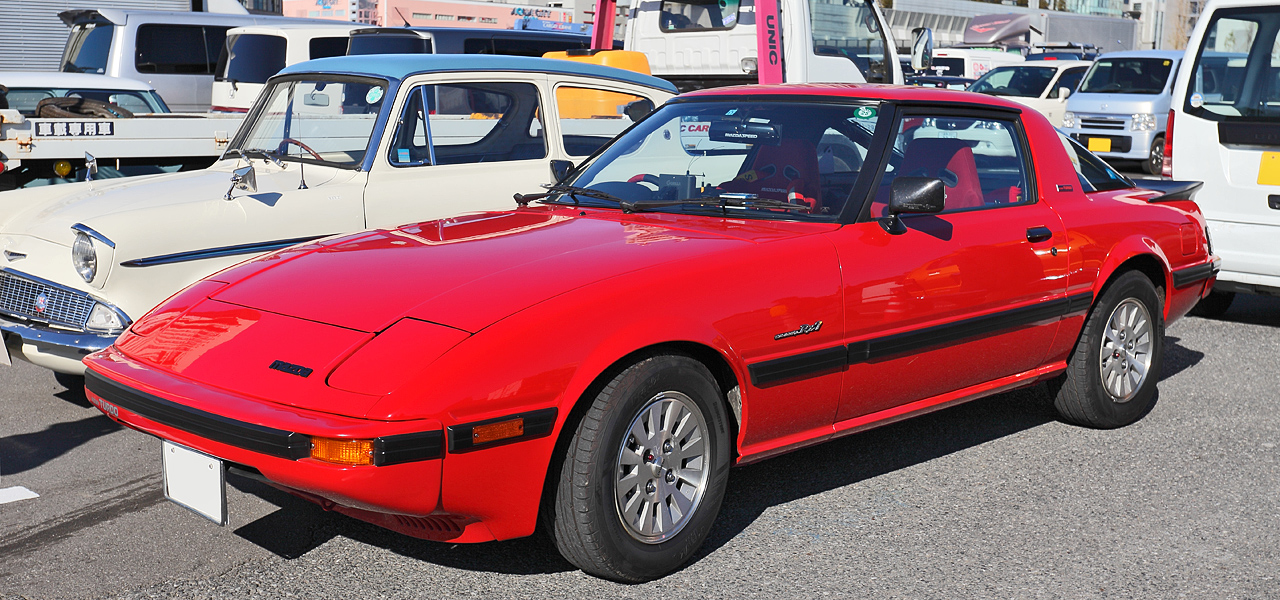
Second generation (SA22C; 1978–1985)

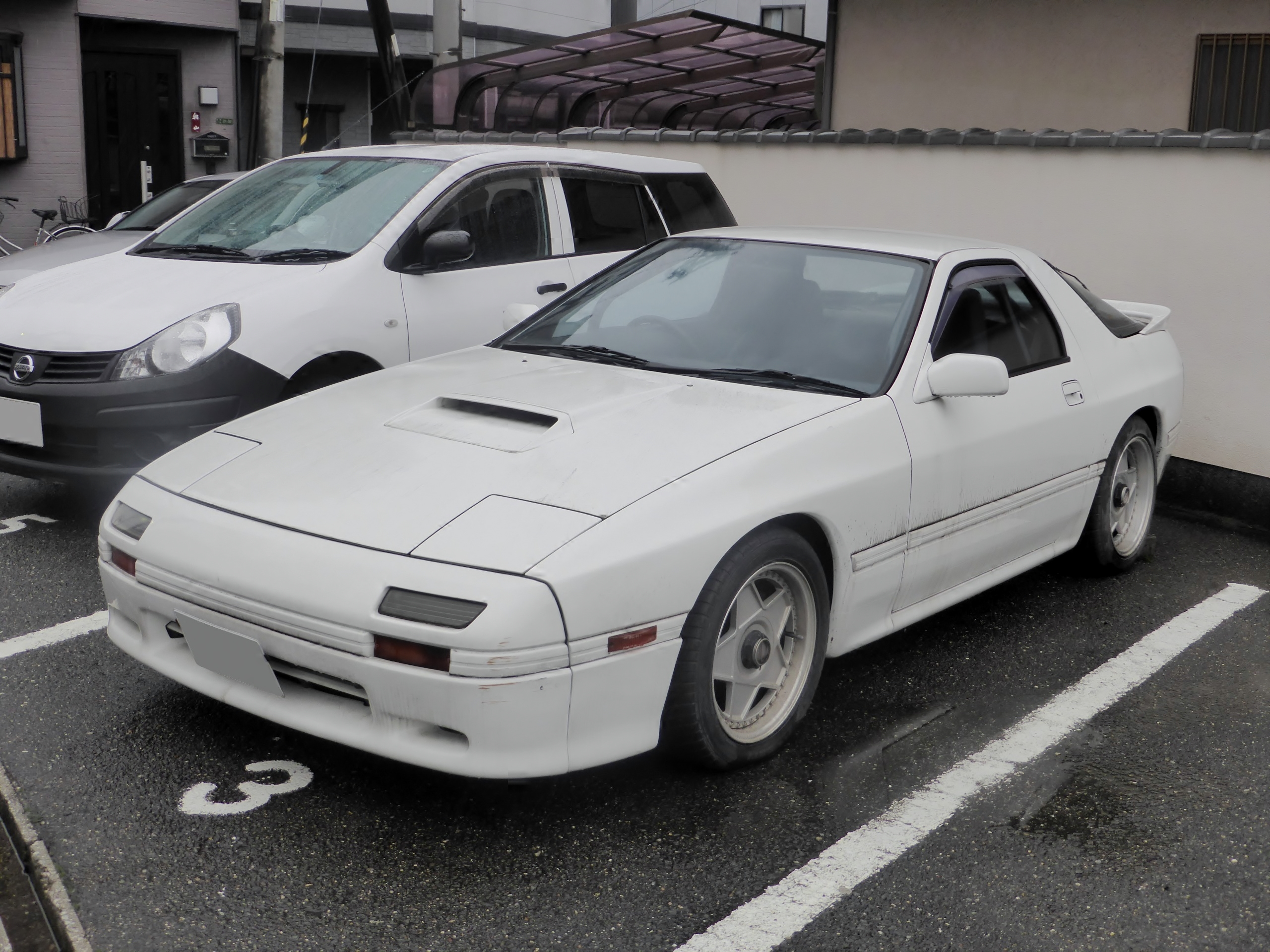
Third generation (FC; 1985–1991)
