= March 75S =

Sports prototype race car

- Category: Group 6

Technical specifications
- Chassis: aluminium monocoque with fiberglass body
- Suspension: double wishbones, coil springs over shock absorbers, anti-roll bar
- Engine: BMW M12/7/Ford-Cosworth BDG/Hart 420R 2.0 L (122.0 cu in) DOHC I4, naturally-aspirated, mid-engined
- Transmission: Hewland FT200 5-speed manual
- Power: 275–300 hp (205–224 kW)
- Weight: 575 kg (1,268 lb)

Competition history
- Debut: 1975 1000km of Mugello

The March 75S is a Group 6 prototype race car, designed, developed and built by British manufacturer March Engineering, for sports car racing, in 1975.
