= Hart 420 engine =

Hart 420R/420S

Overview
- Manufacturer: (United Kingdom) Hart
- Production: 1975–1980

Layout
- Configuration: I4, naturally-aspirated
- Displacement: 1,994 cc (122 cu in)
- Cylinder bore: 93.5 mm (3.68 in)
- Piston stroke: 72.6 mm (2.86 in)
- Cylinder block material: Aluminum alloy
- Cylinder head material: Aluminum alloy
- Valvetrain: 16-valve, DOHC, four-valves per cylinder

Combustion
- Fuel system: fuel injection

Output
- Power output: 290–305 hp (216–227 kW) @ 9500 rpm

The Hart 420R and the Hart 420S are four-stroke, naturally aspirated, 2.0 L (120 cu in), four-cylinder engine, designed, developed and made by Hart Racing Engines, and tuned by Brian Hart, for Formula 2 and sports prototype racing applications, between 1975 and 1980. The 420R is based on the Cosworth FVA, while the 420S is based on the Cosworth BDG, with the design knowledge being taken and used on both. The Hart 420R F2 engine owes much to the Cosworth BDA series, being essentially an aluminium-block derivative using similar heads. Both the 420R and 420S were naturally-aspirated, 2-litre, 16-valve DOHC, fuel-injected, straight-four engines. Displacement is 1,994 cc (121.7 cu in), and maximum power output is between 290–305 hp (216–227 kW; 294–309 PS) at 9,500 rpm, with the motor being failsafe to just over 10,000 rpm. The bore is 93.5 mm (3.68 in), and the stroke is 72.6 mm (2.86 in).

== Background ==
With Ford's withdrawal from F2 in the mid-1970s, Hart began to concentrate on building their own designs. The first engine to bear the Hart name alone was the twin-cam, four-cylinder Hart 420R F2 unit, which appeared in 1976 and powered race-winning cars until the end of the decade. In 1978, the Toleman team agreed to a partnership program, with Toleman providing finance to develop further Hart engine designs. The fruits of this collaboration resulted in Toleman taking a one-two finish in the 1980 European Formula Two Championship.

The Hart-tuned Ford FVA and BDA engines were successful in Formula Two, with Ronnie Peterson winning the European title with an FVA in 1971 and Mike Hailwood taking the same title in 1972 with a BDA. The arrival in F2 of BMW and Renault left Ford reluctant to increase its involvement, so Hart chose to develop his own F2 engine - the 420R - which was first raced in a Chevron sportscar in 1976. This engine was a race winner in F2 in 1977 and 1978.

The off-season of 1978-79 brought the next step in the development of Brian Hart Limited, when the Toleman F2 team committed to providing finance for R&D. Toleman-Hart dominated the European F2 Championship in 1980, with Brian Henton and Derek Warwick finishing 1st and 2nd in the championship standings.
