= March 73S =

Sports prototype race car

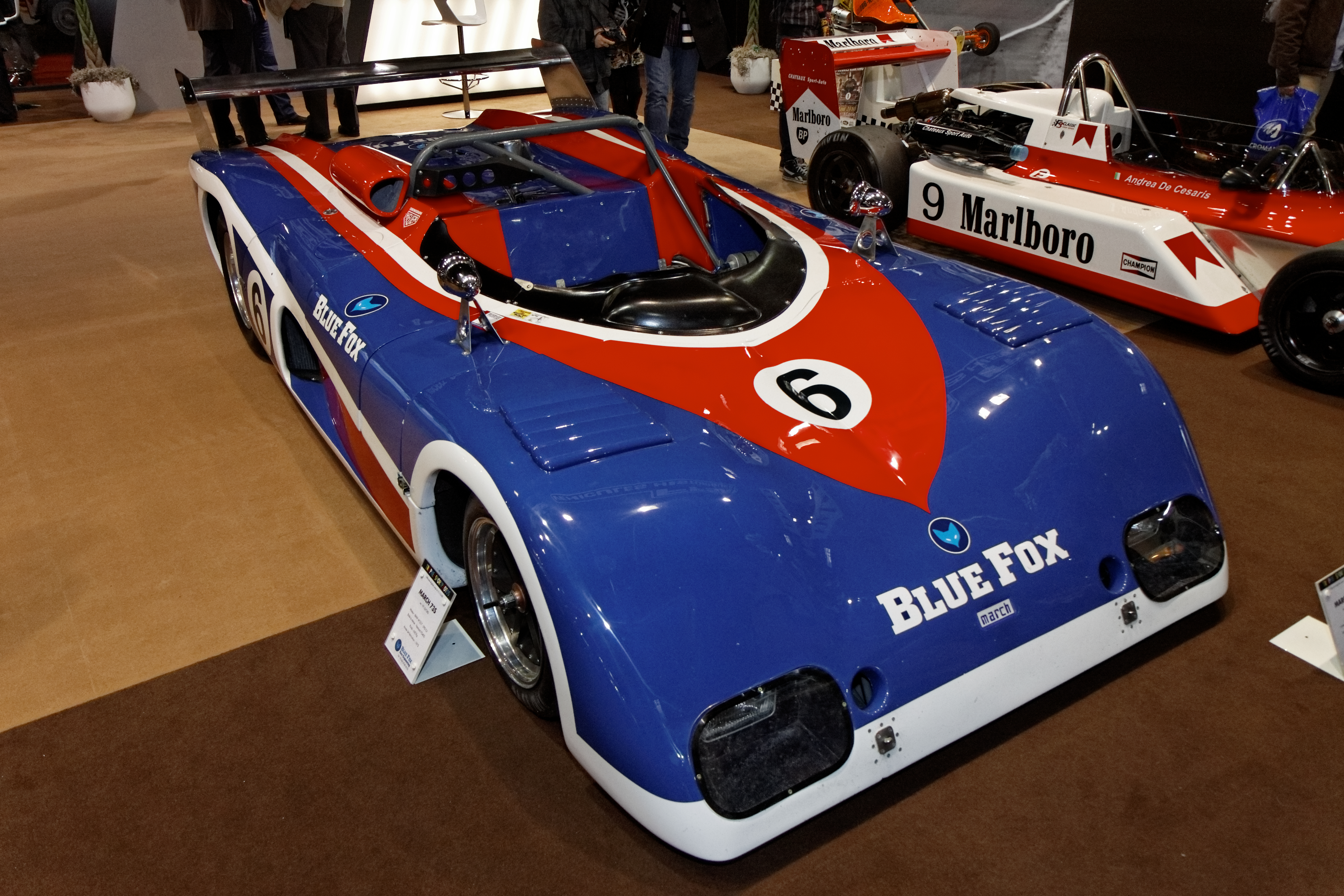
- Category: Group 5

Technical specifications
- Chassis: aluminium monocoque with carbon-fibre reinforcements
- Suspension: double wishbones, push-rod actuated coil springs over shock absorbers, anti-roll bar
- Engine: BMW M12/7 2.0 L (122.0 cu in) I4, naturally-aspirated, mid-engined
- Transmission: Hewland FT200 5-speed manual
- Power: 300 hp (220 kW)
- Weight: 700 kg (1,543 lb)

Competition history
- Debut: 1973 1000km of Monza

The March 73S is a prototype race car, designed, developed and built by British manufacturer March Engineering in 1973 for the FIA Group 5 class of sports car racing.
