= March 76S =

Sports prototype race car

- Category: Group 6

Technical specifications
- Chassis: fibreglass body on aluminium monocoque
- Suspension: double wishbones, push-rod actuated coil springs over shock absorbers, anti-roll bar (front) twin lower links, single upper links, trailing arms, coil springs over dampers, anti-roll bar (rear)
- Engine: Ford-Cosworth DFV 3.0 L (183.1 cu in) DOHC 90° V8 naturally-aspirated mid-engined BMW M12/7 2.0 L (122.0 cu in) DOHC I4 naturally-aspirated mid-engined
- Transmission: Hewland FT200 5-speed manual
- Power: 300–400 hp (220–300 kW)
- Weight: 575 kg (1,268 lb)

Competition history
- Debut: 1976 300km of Nürburgring

The March 76S is a Group 6 prototype race car, designed, developed and built by British manufacturer March Engineering, for sports car racing, in 1976.
