= Chevron B36 =

Prototype race car

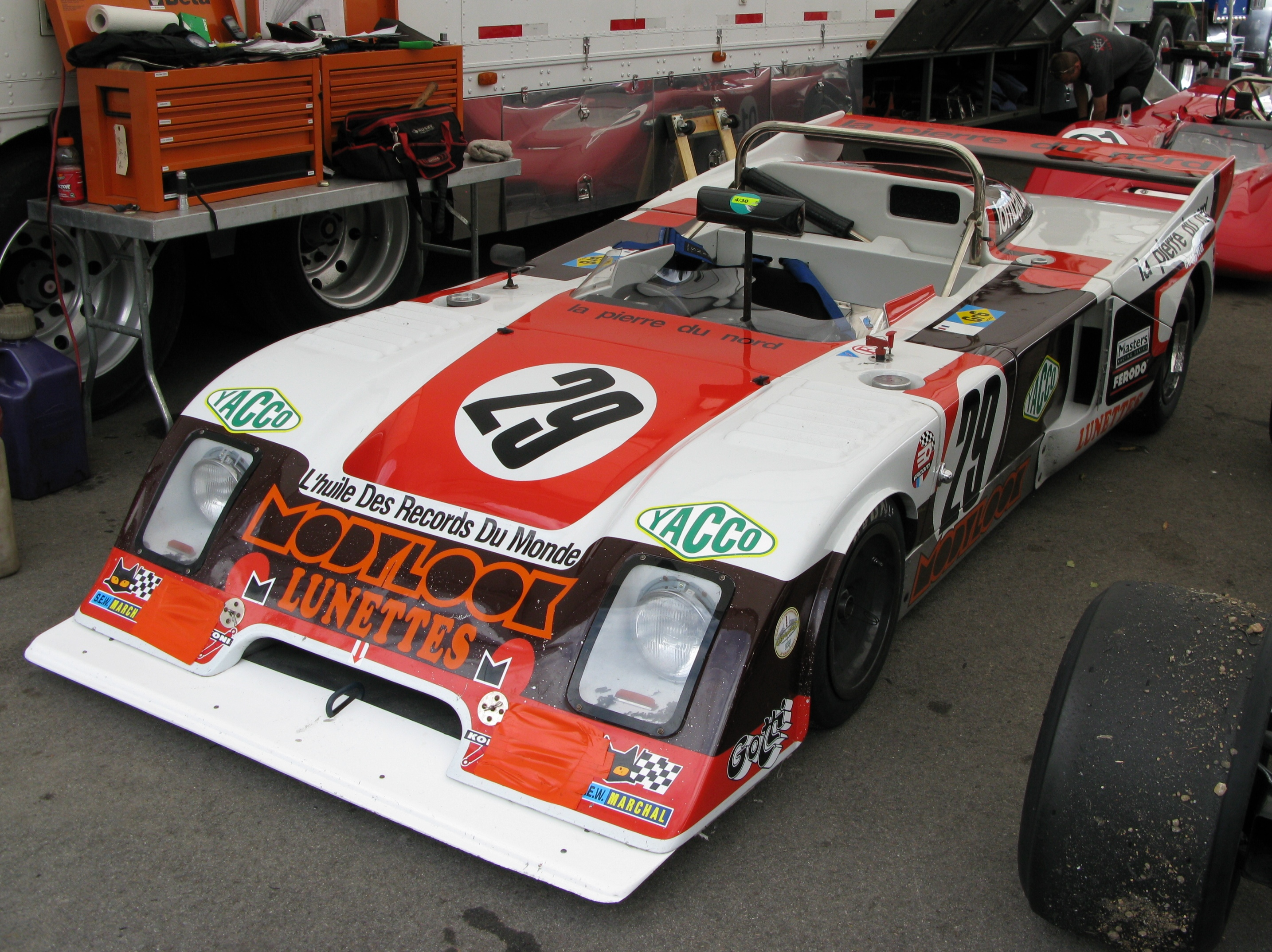
Chevron B36

The Chevron B36 was a Group 6 (later modified into Group C) prototype sports car, designed, developed, and built by British manufacturer Chevron Cars Ltd in 1976 and used in sports car racing until 1987. Over that time period, it won a total of 14 races, and achieved 43 podium finishes.

== Development ==
In Chevron's nomenclature, the B36 succeeded the B35. However, this was not a sports car, but a Formula 2 vehicle that was also available as a slightly modified Formula Atlantic model. At Chevron, the vehicles were simply numbered, no matter what racing formula they were built for.

Conceived for the 2-liter class of sports car racing, the B36 was a conventional racing car with no major innovations. Since it was intended exclusively for sale, it also had to be easy to maintain. The possibility of using different motor types had to be given. The first chassis delivered were powered by a 2-liter 4-cylinder ROC Chrysler Simca unit. Subsequently, the 4-cylinder BDA engine from Cosworth, a rotary engine from Mazda, the M12 4-cylinder engine from BMW, a 2-liter engine from Ford, and a 4-cylinder powerplant from Hart Racing engines were installed in B36. Larger displacement engines were also used. In 1987, Frenchman José Thibault equipped his B36 with a 3-liter, 6-cylinder PRV engine from Talbot for the 24 Hours of Le Mans. Thibault's car was a special specimen in general. It was the only B36 with a closed body; all other B36s were open Spyders. A special feature of this B36 was the covered front and rear wheels.

Between 1976 and 1978, 21 different individual chassis' were completed and delivered by Chevron.

== Racing history ==
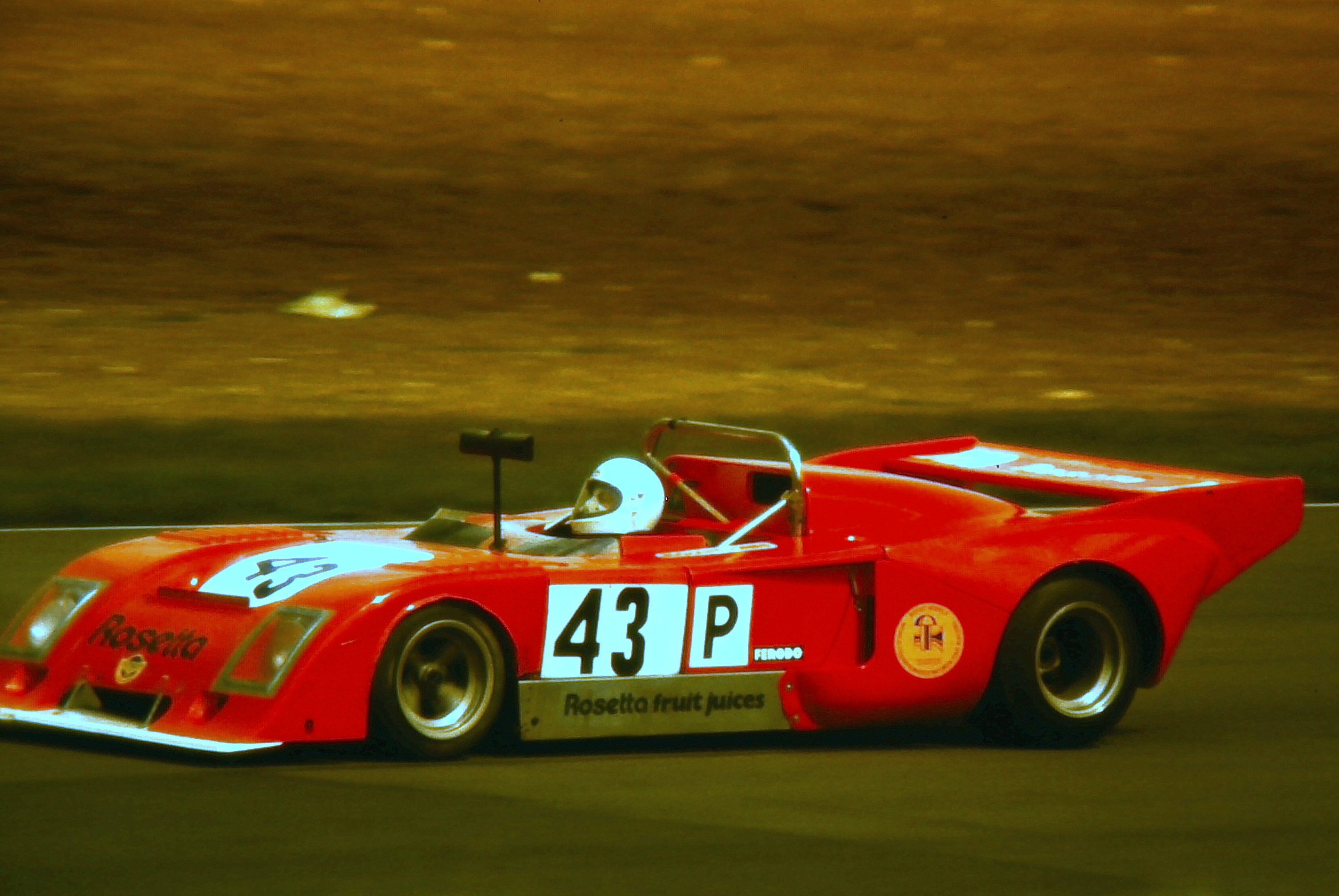
Chevron B36 at the 1979 6 Hours of Silverstone

The racing history of the B36 chassis is extensive and varied. Originally designed for the 2-liter class of international sports car races, some vehicles also came to Japan and North America. Overseas, some chassis have been modified to conform to Canadian-American Challenge Cup regulations, and in Europe to Interseries regulations.

Between 1976 and 1987, B36s were entered in 164 races; all in all, this racing car model has 297 entries. In addition to eleven overall victories, 8 class victories were also achieved; more than 60% of the registered B36 also saw the checkered flag.

The car made its racing debut at the 1976 Monza 4 Hours, a race of the World Sportscar Championship that year. Two B36s were entered in this race; the number 38 car by Italian Giuseppe Piazzi - driven by Piazzi himself and his compatriot Sandro Cinotti, and the number 39 car by the French racing organization Course. There sat François Sérvanin and Laurent Ferrier at the wheel. Both vehicles did not finish. The first finish came two weeks later at the Targa Florio where Giovanni Iacono and Vito Veninata finished the race 36th overall. At the Targa Florio 1977, there was the first race victory. Like last year's race, this was also part of the Italian Group 6 Championship. The car was driven by Raffaele Restivo and Alfonso Merendino.

The two Japanese Hiroshi Fushida and Yōjirō Terada, who drove it regularly in the Fuji Long Distance Series, recorded the most starts with B36s. The last race win for the B36 was achieved in July 1984 by the two Brits Ray Bellm and Mike Wilds in a race for the Thunderports series in Thruxton. The last race was that of José Thibault in 1987 at Le Mans, which ended prematurely after 18 laps driven by an accident.
