= Impul =

Japanese automotive aftermarket company

Hoshino Impul Co., Ltd.
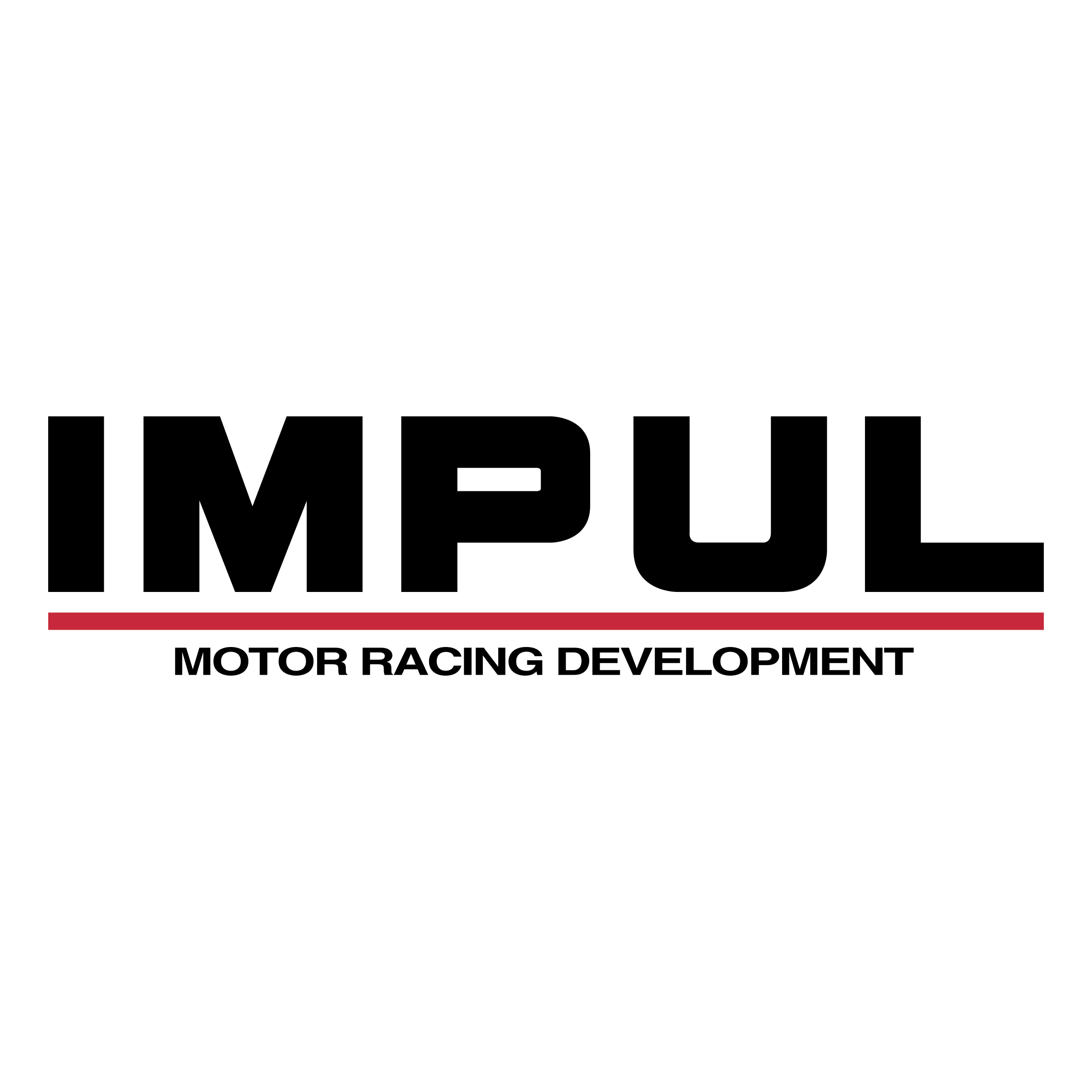
- Type: Private KK
- Industry: Motorsport; Automotive engineering
- Founded: June 1980
- Founder: Kazuyoshi Hoshino
- Headquarters: Setagaya-ku, Tokyo
- Key people: Kazuyoshi Hoshino (President)
- Products: Aluminum wheels, aerodynamics parts, suspensions, etc. Integrated, planning and development of car parts and accessories, manufacture and sales. Planning and development, manufacture and sales of complete automobiles primarily with Nissan
- Revenue: ¥1,297,000,000 (2006)
- Number of employees: 287 (2006)
- Website: Impul.co.jp

Hoshino Impul Co., Ltd., commonly known as Impul, is a Japanese automotive aftermarket company and racing team based in Setagaya-ku, Tokyo. Founded by Nissan's factory driver, Kazuyoshi Hoshino, the company exclusively produces aftermarket parts for Nissans, such as bodykits, engine components as well as wheels.

== History ==
The company was founded in 1980 by the Nissan works driver, Kazuyoshi Hoshino in Maruko-cho, Shizuoka Prefecture. Within months, Impul produced its first product, the IMPUL D-01 wheel, which to promote it, it found its way on Hoshino's Gr. 5 Silvia racing competing in the Formula Silhouette, a Fuji Grand Champion support series, as well as starting a Tokyo-based sales center in Sayama-shi, Saitama-ken. A year later, that was relocated in Kichijōji, Musashino-shi.

In 1983, Hoshino formed Hoshino Racing Limited, a racing team to help promote his products and because of expansion, he relocated his company in Shimorenjaku, Mitaka as well as establishing a depot nearby.

In 1987, Impul offered its first fully tuned car, the IMPUL 630R, a tuned Y30 Gloria/Cedric.

In 2002, the racing relocated to Gotemba, Shizuoka. After that, the company began to focus on tuning cars and has since tuned the Infiniti M, which became the Impul 651S, and the Nissan Juke. Both of these examples of Impul's tuning has changes to the bumpers, engines, brakes, tires, exhaust system, among other things. VIP style is the common element Impul has incorporated on.

== Motorsport ==
Team Impul
- Founded: 1983 (as Hoshino Racing)
- Founder(s): Kazuyoshi Hoshino
- Team principal(s): Kazuki Hoshino
- Current series: Super GT; Super Formula; Super Taikyu; Kyojo Cup
- Current drivers: Super GT; #12 TRS Impul with SDG Z; (Japan) Kazuki Hiramine; (Belgium) Bertrand Baguette; Super Formula; #19 WECARS Impul with SDG; (United Kingdom) Zak O'Sullivan; Super Taikyu; #20 Naniwa Denso Impul with Matsukiyo; (Japan) Takashi Matsumoto; (Japan) Kazuki Oki; (Japan) Kazuki Hiramine; (France) Jules Kazuki Treluyer; Kyojo Cup; #86 Dr.Dry Racing with Impul; (Japan) Rio Shimono
- Website: https://impul.co.jp/team/

Since 1983, the company ran its own racing team which found success in domestic series such as JTCC, Formula Nippon and Super GT. Hoshino was the first driver to win in the team's R32 GT-R during a JTCC race in 1990. In addition to Hoshino, notable Impul drivers include Masahiko Kageyama (1993 Japanese Touring Car Championship winner), Satoshi Motoyama (2001, 2003 and 2005 Formula Nippon champion), Benoît Tréluyer (2006 Formula Nippon champion), Tsugio Matsuda (2007 and 2008 Formula Nippon champion), Yuji Ide, and Kohei Hirate. From 1988 to 2022, auto parts supplier Calsonic served as their primary sponsor in touring car racing. Their partnership has continued through the era of the rebranding to Marelli until the end of 2024. In 2025, the partnership continued with Tokyo Radiator (whose primary owner is Marelli) taking over in Super GT.

== Racing results ==
=== Complete All-Japan Sports Prototype Championship (JSPC) results ===
(key) (Races in bold indicate pole position) (Races in italics indicate fastest lap)

Year	Car	Tyres	Class	No.	Drivers	1	2	3	4	5	6	7	Makes	Pts
1983	Nissan Silvia Turbo C	**B**	C	23	(Japan) Kazuyoshi Hoshino (Japan) Akira Hagiwara	SUZ	**SUZ**; Ret	FUJ; 7					N/A	N/A
1984	Nissan Silvia Turbo C	**B**	A/B; C1	23; 30	(Japan) Kazuyoshi Hoshino (Japan) Akira Hagiwara	SUZ; 13	TSU	SUZ; 12	FUJ; Ret				N/A	N/A
1985	Nissan Silvia Turbo C Nissan R85V	**B**	C	28	(Japan) Kazuyoshi Hoshino (Japan) Akira Hagiwara (Japan) Keiji Matsumoto	SUZ; 2	FUJ; Ret	FUJ; Ret	**SUZ**; Ret	FUJ; 1	FUJ; Ret		4th	30
1986	Nissan R86V	**B**	C LD1	28; 23	(Japan) Kazuyoshi Hoshino (Japan) Osamu Nakako	SUZ; DNS	FUJ	**FUJ**; Ret	**SUZ**; Ret	FUJ; 10	FUJ; Ret		4th	21
1987	Nissan R87E	**B**	C LD1	23	(Japan) Kazuyoshi Hoshino (Japan) Kenji Takahashi (United Kingdom) Dave Scott	SUZ; Ret	FUJ; 8	FUJ; Ret	SUZ; 6	FUJ; 12	FUJ; Ret		4th	22
1988	Nissan R88C	**B**	C LD1	23	(Japan) Kazuyoshi Hoshino (Japan) Kenji Takahashi (United Kingdom) Win Percy (Japan) Toshio Suzuki (Australia) Allan Grice	FUJ; Ret	SUZ; 6	FUJ; 7	FUJ; 5	SUZ; Ret	FUJ; 9		2nd	36
1989	Nissan R88C; Nissan R89C	**D** **B**	C1	23	(Japan) Kazuyoshi Hoshino (Japan) Toshio Suzuki	FUJ; Ret	FUJ; 6	FUJ; Ret	SUZ; DNS	FUJ; Ret			3rd	24
1990	Nissan R90CP	**D** **B**	C1	23	(Japan) Kazuyoshi Hoshino (Japan) Toshio Suzuki	FUJ; 4	FUJ; C	FUJ; 3	SUZ; 1	SUG; 4	FUJ; 2		1st	90
1991	Nissan R90CP; Nissan R91CP	**B**	C1	23	(Japan) Kazuyoshi Hoshino (Japan) Toshio Suzuki	**FUJ**; 1	FUJ; 1	FUJ; 2	SUZ; Ret	SUG; 11	FUJ; 1	SUG; 3	1st	117
1992	Nissan R92CP	**B**	C1; LD2	1	(Japan) Kazuyoshi Hoshino (Japan) Toshio Suzuki (Japan) Takao Wada	SUZ; 9	**FUJ**; 1	FUJ; 1	SUG; 1	FUJ; 1	**MIN**; 1		1st	120

Note: From 1985 to 1987 scored points for March in the Makes Championship. From 1988 the team was run as part of NISMO along with Hasemi Motorsport and scored points for Nissan in the Makes Championship.

=== Complete JGTC results ===
(key) (Races in bold indicate pole position) (Races in italics indicate fastest lap)

Year	Car	Tyres	Class	No.	Drivers	1	2	3	4	5	6	7	8	9	Pos	Pts
1994	Nissan Skyline GT-R	B	GT1	1	(Japan) Masahiko Kageyama	FUJ; 1	SEN; 2	FUJ; 2	SUG; 4	MIN; 4					1st	70
1995	Nissan Skyline GT-R	B	GT1	1	(Japan) Masahiko Kageyama (Japan) Kazuyoshi Hoshino	SUZ; 1	FUJ; 10	SEN; 2	FUJ; 7	SUG; 2	MIN; 3				**2nd**	**67**
1996	Nissan Skyline GT-R	B	GT500	1	(Japan) Masahiko Kageyama (Japan) Kazuyoshi Hoshino	SUZ; 8	FUJ; 5	SEN; 5	FUJ; 1	SUG; 2	MIN; Ret	NC1; 5			**3rd**	**54**
1996	Nissan Silvia	B	GT300	12	(Japan) Satoshi Motoyama (Japan) Yuji Ide (Japan) Fuminori Mizuno	SUZ	FUJ	SEN; Ret	FUJ; Ret	SUG; 12	MIN; 7	NC1			NC	4
1997	Nissan Skyline GT-R	B	GT500	12	(Japan) Satoshi Motoyama (Japan) Kazuyoshi Hoshino (Japan) Fuminori Mizuno (Japan) Takeshi Tsuchiya	SUZ; Ret	FUJ; 5	SEN; 15	FUJ; 4	MIN; 6	SUG; 14	NC1; Ret	NC2; 6		7th	24
1998	Nissan Skyline GT-R	B	GT500	12	(Japan) Takuya Kurosawa (Japan) Kazuyoshi Hoshino (Germany) Michael Krumm	SUZ; 11	FUJ; C	SEN; 5	FUJ; 3	MOT; 2	MIN; 7	SUG; 4	NC1; 5		4th	49
1999	Nissan Skyline GT-R	B	GT500	12	(Japan) Masami Kageyama (Japan) Kazuyoshi Hoshino	SUZ; 10	FUJ; 3	SUG; 5	MIN; 6	FUJ; 5	OKA; 10	MOT; 7	NC1; 11		5th	40
2000	Nissan Skyline GT-R	B	GT500	12	(Japan) Satoshi Motoyama (Japan) Kazuyoshi Hoshino	MOT; 17	FUJ; 5	SUG; 5	NC1; Ret	FUJ; 3	OKA; 6	MIN; 1	SUZ; 3		**3rd**	**66**
2001	Nissan Skyline GT-R	B	GT500	12	(Japan) Satoshi Motoyama (Japan) Naoki Hattori (Japan) Kazuyoshi Hoshino	OKA; 15	FUJ; Ret	SUG; 7	NC1; 7	FUJ; 7	MOT; 3	SUZ; 11	MIN; 5		10th	28
2002	Nissan Skyline GT-R	B	GT500	12	(Japan) Tetsuya Tanaka (Japan) Kazuyoshi Hoshino (France) Benoît Tréluyer	OKA; 14	FUJ; Ret	SUG; 8	SEP; 14	FUJ; NC	MOT; 11	MIN; 13	SUZ; 17		12th	4
2003	Nissan Skyline GT-R	B	GT500	12	(Japan) Yuji Ide (France) Benoît Tréluyer	OKA; 12	FUJ; 2	SUG; Ret	FUJ; 1	FUJ; 16	MOT; 6	AUT; 11	SUZ; 1		5th	64
2004	Nissan Fairlady Z	B	GT500	12	(Japan) Yuji Ide (France) Benoît Tréluyer	OKA; 8	SUG; 10	**SEP**; Ret	TOK; 11	MOT; Ret	AUT; 5	SUZ; 1	NC1; 4	NC2; DNS	9th	35

=== Complete Super GT results ===
(key) (Races in bold indicate pole position) (Races in italics indicate fastest lap)

Year	Car	Tyres	Class	No.	Drivers	1	2	3	4	5	6	7	8	9	10	Pos	Points
2005	Nissan Z	B	GT500	12	(Japan) Yuji Ide (France) Benoît Tréluyer	OKA; Ret	FUJ; 15	SEP; 8	**SUG**; 5	MOT; 3	FUJ; 13	AUT; 4	SUZ; 9			11th	35
2006	Nissan Z	B	GT500	12	(Japan) Kazuki Hoshino (France) Benoît Tréluyer (France) Jérémie Dufour	SUZ; 13	OKA; 6	FUJ; 5	SEP; 3	SUG; 6	**SUZ**; 1	MOT; 13	AUT; 4	FUJ; 12		8th	67
2007	Nissan Z	B	GT500	12	(Japan) Kazuki Hoshino (France) Benoît Tréluyer (France) Jérémie Dufour	SUZ; 11	OKA; 8	FUJ; 10	SEP; 3	SUG; 7	SUZ; Ret	MOT; Ret	AUT; Ret	**FUJ**; 2		11th	34
2008	Nissan GT-R	B	GT500	12	(Japan) Tsugio Matsuda (France) Sébastien Philippe (Germany) Dominik Schwager	SUZ; Ret	OKA; 2	FUJ; 9	SEP; 14	SUG; 12	SUZ; 1	MOT; 11	AUT; 10	FUJ; 1		4th	61
2009	Nissan GT-R	B	GT500	12	(Japan) Tsugio Matsuda (France) Sébastien Philippe	OKA; 4	SUZ; 3	FUJ; 15	SEP; 7	SUG; 8	SUZ; 5	FUJ; 15	AUT; Ret	MOT; 7		10th	36
2010	Nissan GT-R	B	GT500	12	(Japan) Tsugio Matsuda (Italy) Ronnie Quintarelli	SUZ; Ret	OKA; 4	FUJ; 6	**SEP**; 1	SUG; 4	SUZ; 12	FUJ; C	MOT; 5	NC1; 3	**NC2**; 5	5th	47
2011	Nissan GT-R	B	GT500	12	(Japan) Tsugio Matsuda (Brazil) João Paulo de Oliveira	OKA; 1	FUJ; 14	SEP; 15	SUG; 13	SUZ; 3	FUJ; 2	AUT; 10	MOT; 9	NC1; 2	NC2; Ret	5th	49
2012	Nissan GT-R	B	GT500	12	(Japan) Tsugio Matsuda (Brazil) João Paulo de Oliveira	OKA; 10	FUJ; 5	SEP; 5	SUG; Ret	SUZ; 4	**FUJ**; 1	AUT; 10	MOT; 10	NC1; 6	NC2; 11	4th	45
2013	Nissan GT-R	B	GT500	12	(Japan) Tsugio Matsuda (Brazil) João Paulo de Oliveira	OKA; 6	FUJ; 5	**SEP**; 1	SUG; Ret	SUZ; 4	FUJ; 6	AUT; Ret	MOT; 13	NC1; 8	NC2; 3	9th	46
2014	Nissan GT-R	B	GT500	12	(Brazil) João Paulo de Oliveira (Japan) Hironobu Yasuda	OKA; 3	**FUJ**; 1	AUT; 3	SUG; 9	FUJ; 8	SUZ; 10	BUR; 3	MOT; 13			5th	60
2015	Nissan GT-R	B	GT500	12	(Brazil) João Paulo de Oliveira (Japan) Hironobu Yasuda	OKA; 7	FUJ; 2	CHA; 4	FUJ; 3	SUZ; 3	SUG; 11	**AUT**; 2	MOT; 4			2nd	74
2016	Nissan GT-R	B	GT500	12	(Brazil) João Paulo de Oliveira (Japan) Hironobu Yasuda	OKA; 5	**FUJ**; 11	SUG; Ret	**FUJ**; 1	SUZ; Ret	CHA; 4	MOT; 7	MOT; 8			8th	43
2017	Nissan GT-R	B	GT500	12	(Japan) Hironobu Yasuda (United Kingdom) Jann Mardenborough	OKA; 8	FUJ; 14	AUT; 7	SUG; 11	FUJ; 5	SUZ; 11	CHA; 14	MOT; 7			13th	17
2018	Nissan GT-R	B	GT500	12	(United Kingdom) Jann Mardenborough (Japan) Daiki Sasaki	OKA; 14	FUJ; 6	SUZ; 4	CHA; 6	FUJ; 12	SUG; 3	AUT; 11	MOT; 11			11th	29
2019	Nissan GT-R	B	GT500	12	(Japan) Daiki Sasaki (United Kingdom) James Rossiter (Japan) Katsumasa Chiyo	OKA; 3‡	FUJ; 12	SUZ; 10	BUR; 8	FUJ; 5	AUT; 12	SUG; 14	MOT; Ret	NC1; 19	NC2; 17	13th	17.5
2020	Nissan GT-R	B	GT500	12	(Japan) Daiki Sasaki (Japan) Kazuki Hiramine	FUJ; Ret	FUJ; 11	SUZ; 12	MOT; 12	FUJ; 8	SUZ; 2	MOT; 9	FUJ; 7			13th	24
2021	Nissan GT-R	B	GT500	12	(Japan) Kazuki Hiramine (Japan) Nobuharu Matsushita	OKA; 10	FUJ; 9	MOT; 11	SUZ; 6	SUG; 1	AUT; 7	MOT; 3	FUJ; 9			8th	45
2022	Nissan Z	B	GT500	12	(Japan) Kazuki Hiramine (Belgium) Bertrand Baguette	OKA; 7	FUJ; 3‡	SUZ; Ret	FUJ; 2	SUZ; 1	SUG; 5	AUT; 6	MOT; 2			1st	70.5
2023	Nissan Z	B	GT500	1	(Japan) Kazuki Hiramine (Belgium) Bertrand Baguette	OKA; 6	FUJ; 9	SUZ; 3	FUJ; 15	SUZ; 5	SUG; 4	AUT; 5	MOT; 4			5th	69
2024	Nissan Z	B	GT500	12	(Japan) Kazuki Hiramine (Belgium) Bertrand Baguette	OKA; 11	FUJ; 6	SUZ; 4	FUJ; 5	SUG; 3	AUT; 5	MOT; 11	SUZ; 3			5th	70
2025	Nissan Z	B	GT500	12	(Japan) Kazuki Hiramine (Belgium) Bertrand Baguette	OKA; Ret	FUJ; 4	SEP; 3	FS1; 6	FS2; 5	SUZ; 8	SUG; 14	AUT; 11	MOT; DSQ		12th	44.5
2026	Nissan Z	B	GT500	12	(Japan) Kazuki Hiramine (Belgium) Bertrand Baguette	OKA; 3	FUJ; 7	FUJ; 12	SUZ; 6	SUG; 13	AUT; 5	MOT; 1	MOT; 3			4th	78

^{‡} Half points awarded as less than 75% of race distance was completed. * Season still in progress.

=== Complete Japanese Top Formula racing results ===
(key) (Races in bold indicate pole position) (Races in italics indicate fastest lap)

Year	Chassis	Engine	Tyres	No.	Drivers	1	2	3	4	5	6	7	8	9	10	11	12	D.C.	Pts	T.C.	Pts
All Japan Formula 2
1983	March 832	BMW M12/7	B	2	(Japan) Kazuyoshi Hoshino	SUZ; 4	**FUJ**; DSQ	**MIN**; 3	SUZ; 2	**SUZ**; 2	FUJ; 3	**SUZ**; 2	SUZ; 3					2nd	79(89)	N/A	N/A
1984	March 842	BMW M12/7	B	1	(Japan) Kazuyoshi Hoshino	SUZ; 2	FUJ; 2	MIN; 1	SUZ; 2	SUZ; 2	FUJ; 5	SUZ; 2	SUZ; Ret					3rd	95(103)	N/A	N/A
1985	March 85J	Honda RA265E	B	2	(Japan) Kazuyoshi Hoshino	SUZ; 10	**FUJ**; 2	MIN; 2	SUZ; DNS	SUZ; 1	FUJ; 11	SUZ; 14	SUZ; DNS					4th	51	N/A	N/A
1986	March 86J	Honda RA266E	B	2	(Japan) Kazuyoshi Hoshino	SUZ; Ret	FUJ; 3	MIN; Ret	SUZ; 2	SUZ; 1	FUJ; Ret	SUZ; 1	SUZ; 1					2nd	87	N/A	N/A
Japanese Formula 3000
1987	March 87B; Lola T87/50	Honda RA387E	B	2	(Japan) Kazuyoshi Hoshino	SUZ; 1	**FUJ**; 10	MIN; 2	SUZ; 1	SUZ; 1	SUG; 1	FUJ; 6	SUZ; 2	SUZ; 2				1st	132	N/A	N/A
1988	Lola T88/50	Mugen MF308	B	1	(Japan) Kazuyoshi Hoshino	**SUZ**; 1	FUJ; 2	MIN; 3	SUZ; 2	SUG; 3	FUJ; Ret	**SUZ**; 1	SUZ; 1					2nd	43(47)	N/A	N/A
1989	Lola T88/50; Lola T89/50	Mugen MF308	B	1	(Japan) Kazuyoshi Hoshino	**SUZ**; 1	FUJ; Ret	MIN; Ret	**SUZ**; Ret	SUG; Ret	FUJ; 1	SUZ; 3	SUZ; Ret					3rd	22	N/A	N/A
1990	Lola T90/50	Mugen MF308	B	19	(Japan) Kazuyoshi Hoshino	**SUZ**; 1	**FUJ**; 1	MIN; 4	SUZ; 16	SUG; 3	FUJ; 1	FUJ; 1	SUZ; 1	FUJ; 5	SUZ; 1			1st	58(63)	N/A	N/A
1991	Lola T90/50; Lola T91/50	Mugen MF308	B	1	(Japan) Kazuyoshi Hoshino	SUZ; Ret	AUT; 2	FUJ; 1	MIN; Ret	SUZ; Ret	SUG; Ret	FUJ; 1	SUZ; Ret	FUJ; C	**SUZ**; Ret	**FUJ**; Ret		4th	24	N/A	N/A
1992	Lola T91/50; Reynard 92D; Lola T92/50	Mugen MF308; Cosworth DFV	B	19	(Japan) Kazuyoshi Hoshino	SUZ; 2	FUJ; Ret	MIN; DNQ	SUZ; Ret	AUT; Ret	SUG; 7	FUJ; 3	FUJ; Ret	SUZ; Ret	FUJ; 12	SUZ; 13		12th	10	N/A	N/A
1993	Lola T92/50	Cosworth DFV	B	19	(Japan) Kazuyoshi Hoshino	SUZ; 2	FUJ; 1	MIN; Ret	SUZ; 2	AUT; C	SUG; Ret	FUJ; C	FUJ; Ret	SUZ; 5	FUJ; 1	SUZ; Ret		1st	32	N/A	N/A
1994	Lola T92/50; Lola T93/50	Mugen MF308	B	1	(Japan) Kazuyoshi Hoshino	SUZ; Ret	FUJ; 7	MIN; Ret	SUZ; Ret	SUG; Ret	FUJ; 5	**NC1**; 1	SUZ; 15	FUJ; Ret	FUJ; 4	SUZ; 6		8th	6	N/A	N/A
1995	Lola T94/50	Mugen MF308	B	15	(Japan) Toshio Suzuki	SUZ; 5	FUJ; C	MIN; 2	SUZ; 1	SUG; Ret	**FUJ**; 3	TOK; 6	FUJ; 3	SUZ; 1				1st	34(35)	N/A	N/A
1995	Lola T93/50; Lola T95/50	Mugen MF308	B	19	(Japan) Kazuyoshi Hoshino	SUZ; 11	FUJ; C	MIN; 3	SUZ; 6	SUG; Ret	FUJ; 2	TOK; Ret	FUJ; 2	SUZ; 4				4th	20	N/A	N/A
Formula Nippon
1996	Lola T96/94; Lola T96/52	Mugen MF308 (Tomei)	B	1	(Japan) Toshio Suzuki	SUZ; 18	MIN; Ret	FUJ; 12	TOK; 11	SUZ; 9	SUG; 10	FUJ; 7	**MIN**; 4	SUZ; 3	FUJ; Ret			12th	7	2nd	38
1996	Lola T96/94; Lola T96/52	Mugen MF308 (Tomei)	B	19	(Japan) Kazuyoshi Hoshino	SUZ; 1	MIN; Ret	FUJ; 3	TOK; 4	SUZ; 5	SUG; 2	FUJ; Ret	MIN; Ret	SUZ; 2	**FUJ**; Ret			3rd	31	2nd	38
1997	Lola T96/52	Mugen MF308 (Tomei)	B	19	(Japan) Takuya Kurosawa	SUZ; 2	MIN; 2	**FUJ**; 1	SUZ; Ret	SUG; Ret	FUJ; Ret	MIN; Ret	MOT; Ret	FUJ; Ret	SUZ; 2			2nd	28	2nd	44
1997	Reynard 96D; Lola T95/50	Mugen MF308 (Tomei)	B	20	(Japan) Masahiko Kageyama	SUZ; Ret	MIN; Ret	FUJ; 5	SUZ; 2	SUG; 3	FUJ; Ret	MIN; 15	MOT; Ret	FUJ; 12	SUZ; 3			7th	16	2nd	44
1998	Lola T98/51	Mugen MF308 (Tomei)	B	19	(Japan) Takuya Kurosawa	SUZ; Ret	MIN; Ret	FUJ; 3	MOT; Ret	SUZ; Ret	SUG; Ret	**FUJ**; C	MIN; Ret	FUJ; Ret	SUZ; 5			12th	6	4th	27
1998	Lola T96/52	Mugen MF308 (Tomei)	B	20	(Japan) Masahiko Kageyama	SUZ; 1	MIN; Ret	FUJ; Ret	MOT; 8	**SUZ**; 1	SUG; Ret	FUJ; C	MIN; Ret	FUJ; Ret	SUZ; 6			5th	21	4th	27
1999	Lola B99/51; Reynard 99L	Mugen MF308 (Tomei)	B	19	(Japan) Masami Kageyama	SUZ; Ret	MOT; Ret	MIN; 6	FUJ; 12	SUZ; 1	SUG; Ret	FUJ; Ret	MIN; Ret	MOT; 4	SUZ; 4			6th	17	3rd	24
1999	Lola B99/51; Reynard 99L	Mugen MF308 (Tomei)	B	20	(Japan) Hideki Noda	SUZ; Ret	MOT; 16	MIN; 13	FUJ; 14	SUZ; 6	SUG; Ret	FUJ; Ret	MIN; 2	MOT; 9	SUZ; 11			11th	7	3rd	24
2000	Reynard 99L	Mugen MF308 (Tomei)	B	19	(Japan) Satoshi Motoyama	SUZ; 6	MOT; 4	MIN; Ret	FUJ; 8	SUZ; 6	SUG; 4	MOT; 3	**FUJ**; 2	MIN; 2	**SUZ**; 1			3rd	34	3rd	34
2001	Reynard 01L	Mugen MF308 (Tomei)	B	19	(Japan) Satoshi Motoyama	SUZ; Ret	**MOT**; 9	**MIN**; 1	**FUJ**; Ret	SUZ; 1	SUG; 1	FUJ; 4	MIN; 1	MOT; 2	SUZ; Ret			1st	49	2nd	51
2001	Reynard 99L	Mugen MF308 (Tomei)	B	20	(India) Narain Karthikeyan	SUZ; 6	MOT; 7	MIN; 9	FUJ; Ret	SUZ; Ret	SUG; Ret	FUJ; 9	MIN; Ret	MOT; Ret	SUZ; 6			4th	29	2nd	51
2002	Reynard 01L	Mugen MF308	B	1	(Japan) Satoshi Motoyama	SUZ; Ret	**FUJ**; 1	MIN; 1	SUZ; 5	MOT; 1	SUG; Ret	FUJ; 3	MIN; 1	MOT; 3	SUZ; 1			2nd	60	2nd	60
2002	Reynard 99L	Mugen MF308	B	2	(Germany) Michael Krumm	SUZ; 7	FUJ; 7	MIN	SUZ	MOT	SUG	FUJ	MIN	MOT	SUZ			15th	0	2nd	60
2003	Lola B03/51	Mugen MF308	B	19	(Japan) Satoshi Motoyama	SUZ; 1	**FUJ**; 1	**MIN**; 1	MOT; 9	SUZ; 14	SUG; 1	**FUJ**; 2	**MIN**; 13	MOT; 2	**SUZ**; 3			1st	56	1st	91
2003	Lola B03/51	Mugen MF308	B	20	(France) Benoît Tréluyer	SUZ; Ret	FUJ; 2	MIN; Ret	MOT; NC	SUZ; 2	**SUG**; 4	FUJ; 1	MIN; 1	MOT; 9	SUZ; Ret			2nd	35	1st	91
2004	Lola B3/51	Mugen MF308	B	19	(France) Benoît Tréluyer	SUZ; Ret	SUG; 6	MOT; 4	SUZ; 2	SUG; 10	**MIN**; 1	SEP; 7	MOT; Ret	SUZ; 1				4th	30	1st	62
2004	Lola B3/51	Mugen MF308	B	20	(Japan) Yuji Ide	**SUZ**; 12	SUG; 2	MOT; 2	SUZ; 3	SUG; 7	MIN; 7	SEP; 10	MOT; 1	SUZ; 2				3rd	32	1st	62
2005	Lola B3/51	Mugen MF308	B	19	(France) Benoît Tréluyer	MOT; 6	**SUZ**; 9	SUG; Ret	FUJ; 1	SUZ; Ret	**MIN**; Ret	FUJ; 12	MOT; 11	SUZ; 4				6th	14	1st	101
2005	Lola B3/51	Mugen MF308	B	20	(Japan) Yuji Ide	MOT; 2	SUZ; 1	**SUG**; 5	FUJ; 7	SUZ; 8	MIN; 1	FUJ; 3	MOT; 4	SUZ; 3				2nd	39	1st	101
2005	Lola B3/51	Mugen MF308	B	23	(Japan) Satoshi Motoyama	MOT; 4	SUZ; 4	SUG; 1	FUJ; 2	SUZ; 1	MIN; 3	FUJ; 13	MOT; 1	SUZ; 2				1st	52	1st	101
2006	Lola FN06	Toyota RV8J	B	1	(Japan) Satoshi Motoyama	FUJ; 3	SUZ; 8	MOT; 3	SUZ; 3	AUT; Ret	FUJ; 3	SUG; 5	MOT; Ret	SUZ; Ret				5th	16	4th	16
2006	Lola FN06	Toyota RV8J	B	2	(Japan) Kazuki Hoshino	FUJ; 18	SUZ; 14	MOT; Ret	SUZ; Ret	AUT; 14	FUJ; 13	SUG; Ret	MOT; Ret	SUZ; 14				25th	0	4th	16
2006	Lola FN06	Toyota RV8J	B	19	(France) Benoît Tréluyer	**FUJ**; 1	**SUZ**; 3	MOT; 2	**SUZ**; 1	AUT; 7	FUJ; 1	SUG; 2	MOT; 1	SUZ; Ret				1st	51	1st	88
2006	Lola FN06	Toyota RV8J	B	20	(Japan) Tsugio Matsuda	FUJ; 2	SUZ; 9	MOT; 5	SUZ; 2	AUT; 1	FUJ; 7	SUG; 3	MOT; 2	**SUZ**; 2				2nd	37	1st	88
2007	Lola FN06	Toyota RV8J	B	1	(France) Benoît Tréluyer	**FUJ**; 1	SUZ; Ret	MOT; 4	OKA; 2	SUZ; Ret	FUJ; 2	SUG; 2	MOT; 3	SUZ; Ret				2nd	45	1st	91
2007	Lola FN06	Toyota RV8J	B	2	(Japan) Tsugio Matsuda	FUJ; 2	**SUZ**; 2	**MOT**; 3	OKA; 3	**SUZ**; 4	FUJ; 13	SUG; 5	MOT; 5	SUZ; 4				1st	46	1st	91
2007	Lola FN06	Toyota RV8J	B	19	(Japan) Satoshi Motoyama	FUJ; Ret	SUZ; 1	MOT; 6	OKA; 10	SUZ; 1	**FUJ**; Ret	SUG; 4	MOT; 11	SUZ; 1				4th	38	3rd	50
2007	Lola FN06	Toyota RV8J	B	20	(Germany) Michael Krumm	FUJ; 6	SUZ; 7	MOT; 7	OKA; 8	SUZ; 5	FUJ; Ret	SUG; Ret	MOT; 15	SUZ; Ret				10th	12	3rd	50
2008	Lola FN06	Toyota RV8J	B	1	(Japan) Tsugio Matsuda	**FUJ**; 1	**SUZ**; 1	**MOT**; 1	**OKA**; Ret	**SUZ**; 1	SUZ; 8	**MOT**; 2	MOT; 2	FUJ; 4	FUJ; 5	SUG; 1		1st	93.5	1st	114.5
2008	Lola FN06	Toyota RV8J	B	2	(France) Benoît Tréluyer	FUJ; 4	SUZ; 7	MOT; Ret	OKA; 8	SUZ; Ret	SUZ; 13	MOT; 15	MOT; Ret	FUJ; 7	FUJ; 2	SUG; 4		8th	27	1st	114.5
2008	Lola FN06	Toyota RV8J	B	20	(Japan) Kohei Hirate	FUJ; Ret	SUZ; 2	MOT; 6	OKA; 3	SUZ; 5	SUZ; 1	MOT; Ret	MOT; DNS			SUG; 5		4th	42	6th	42
2008	Lola FN06	Toyota RV8J	B	20	(United Kingdom) Richard Lyons									FUJ; 13	FUJ; 13			22nd	0	6th	42
2009	Swift 017.n	Toyota RV8K	B	1	(Japan) Tsugio Matsuda	FUJ; Ret	SUZ; Ret	MOT; 6	FUJ; Ret	SUZ; 12	MOT; 5	AUT; 7	SUG; 7					11th	11	3rd	50
2009	Swift 017.n	Toyota RV8K	B	2	(France) Benoît Tréluyer	FUJ; 1	**SUZ**; 2	MOT; 2	FUJ; Ret	SUZ; 3	**MOT**; 3	**AUT**; 8	SUG; 9					2nd	40	3rd	50
2009	Swift 017.n	Toyota RV8K	B	20	(Japan) Kohei Hirate	**FUJ**; 3	SUZ; 4	MOT; Ret	FUJ; 5	SUZ; 5	MOT; 8	AUT; 4	SUG; 3					5th	32	4th	31
2010	Swift 017.n	Toyota RV8K	B	19	(Brazil) João Paulo de Oliveira	SUZ; 2	**MOT**; 1	FUJ; 3	MOT; 6	SUG; 11	AUT; 2	SUZ; 4	**SUZ**; 1	NC1; 10	NC2; DSQ			1st	47.5	1st	68
2010	Swift 017.n	Toyota RV8K	B	20	(Japan) Kohei Hirate	SUZ; 4	MOT; 7	FUJ; 1	MOT; 3	SUG; 12	AUT; 8	SUZ; 9	SUZ; 6	NC1; 5	NC2; 6			5th	25.5	1st	68
2011	Swift 017.n	Toyota RV8K	B	1	(Brazil) João Paulo de Oliveira	SUZ; 6	AUT; 4	**FUJ**; 4	**MOT**; 1	SUZ; C	SUG; DSQ	MOT; 9	MOT; 3	**NC1**; 1				3rd	28	2nd	41
2011	Swift 017.n	Toyota RV8K	B	2	(Japan) Kohei Hirate	SUZ; 9	AUT; 8	FUJ; 2	MOT; 5	SUZ; C	SUG; 8	MOT; 7	MOT; Ret	NC1; 10				8th	15	2nd	41
2012	Swift 017.n	Toyota RV8K	B	19	(Brazil) João Paulo de Oliveira	SUZ; 3	MOT; 2	AUT; Ret	FUJ; 6	**MOT**; 1	SUG; 6	SUZ; 4	**SUZ**; Ret	NC1; 2				5th	34.5	3rd	51.5
2012	Swift 017.n	Toyota RV8K	B	20	(Japan) Tsugio Matsuda	SUZ; 8	MOT; 6	AUT; 4	FUJ; 5	MOT; 7	SUG; Ret	**SUZ**; 2	SUZ; Ret	NC1; 5				8th	20	3rd	51.5
Super Formula
2013	Swift SF13	Toyota RV8K	B	19	(Brazil) João Paulo de Oliveira	SUZ; 6	AUT; 4	FUJ; 6	MOT; 4	SUG; Ret	SUZ; 3	SUZ; 17	NC1; 6					5th	19	3rd	37.5
2013	Swift SF13	Toyota RV8K	B	20	(Japan) Tsugio Matsuda	SUZ; 2	AUT; 5	FUJ; 16	MOT; 13	SUG; 5	SUZ; 4	SUZ; 16	NC1; 3					6th	18.5	3rd	37.5
2014	Dallara SF14	Toyota RI4A	B	19	(Brazil) João Paulo de Oliveira	SUZ; 7	**FUJ**; 1	FUJ; 2	FUJ; Ret	**MOT**; 1	AUT; 3	SUG; Ret	SUZ; 1	SUZ; 4				2nd	39.5	4th	39.5
2014	Dallara SF14	Toyota RI4A	B	20	(India) Narain Karthikeyan	SUZ; Ret	FUJ; 7	FUJ; 6	FUJ; 7	MOT; Ret	AUT; 17	SUG; 11	SUZ; 10	SUZ; 8				13th	5	4th	39.5
2015	Dallara SF14	Toyota RI4A	B	19	(Brazil) João Paulo de Oliveira	SUZ; 4	OKA; 5	FUJ; 1	MOT; 3	AUT; 5	SUG; 7	SUZ; Ret	SUZ; 3					4th	34	3rd	37
2015	Dallara SF14	Toyota RI4A	B	20	(Italy) Andrea Caldarelli	SUZ; 11	OKA; 6	**FUJ**; 9	MOT; 11	AUT; 15	SUG; 16	SUZ; Ret	SUZ; 12					14th	4	3rd	37
2016	Dallara SF14	Toyota RI4A	Y	19	(Brazil) João Paulo de Oliveira	SUZ; 10	OKA; 19	FUJ; 1	MOT; Ret	OKA; 8	OKA; 5	SUG; Ret	SUZ; 8	SUZ; 4				7th	15.5	3rd	42
2016	Dallara SF14	Toyota RI4A	Y	20	(Japan) Yuhi Sekiguchi	SUZ; 14	OKA; 13	FUJ; 3	**MOT**; 1	OKA; 14	OKA; 9	**SUG**; 1	SUZ; 18	SUZ; 8				3rd	28.5	3rd	42
2017	Dallara SF14	Toyota RI4A	Y	19	(Japan) Yuhi Sekiguchi	SUZ; 12	**OKA**; 2	OKA; 1	FUJ; 4	MOT; 16	AUT; 10	SUG; 1	SUZ; C	SUZ; C				4th	25	5th	27.5
2017	Dallara SF14	Toyota RI4A	Y	20	(United Kingdom) Jann Mardenborough	SUZ; 18	OKA; 6	OKA; 17	FUJ; 8	MOT; 14	AUT; 8	SUG; 9	SUZ; C	**SUZ**; C				14th	4.5	5th	27.5
2018	Dallara SF14	Toyota RI4A	Y	19	(Japan) Yuhi Sekiguchi	SUZ; 2	AUT; C	SUG; 13	FUJ; 6	MOT; 16	**OKA**; 1	SUZ; 8						4th	18	4th	33
2018	Dallara SF14	Toyota RI4A	Y	20	(Japan) Ryo Hirakawa	SUZ; Ret	**AUT**; C	SUG; 9	FUJ; 4	MOT; 2	OKA; 3	SUZ; Ret						5th	17	4th	33
2019	Dallara SF19	Toyota RI4A	Y	19	(Japan) Yuhi Sekiguchi	SUZ; Ret	AUT; 1	SUG; 10	FUJ; 8	MOT; 15	OKA; 13	SUZ; 4						8th	16	4th	27
2019	Dallara SF19	Toyota RI4A	Y	20	(Japan) Ryo Hirakawa	SUZ; Ret	AUT; 14	SUG; 11	FUJ; 12	MOT; 1	**OKA**; 12	SUZ; 8						10th	12	4th	27
2020	Dallara SF19	Toyota RI4A	Y	19	(Japan) Yuhi Sekiguchi	MOT; Ret	OKA; 5	SUG; 11	AUT; 11	SUZ; DNS	SUZ; 3	FUJ; DNS						14th	17	4th	69
2020	Dallara SF19	Toyota RI4A	Y	20	(Japan) Ryo Hirakawa	**MOT**; 1	**OKA**; 4	SUG; 2	AUT; 12	SUZ; Ret	SUZ; 7	FUJ; 6						2nd	60	4th	69
2021	Dallara SF19	Toyota RI4A	Y	19	(Japan) Yuhi Sekiguchi	FUJ; 17†	SUZ; 4	AUT; 10	**SUG**; 3	MOT; 2	MOT; 4	SUZ; 4						3rd	55	1st	88
2021	Dallara SF19	Toyota RI4A	Y	20	(Japan) Ryo Hirakawa	FUJ; 4	SUZ; 2	AUT; Ret		MOT; 4	MOT; Ret	SUZ; 2						4th	46	1st	88
2021	Dallara SF19	Toyota RI4A	Y	20	(Japan) Mitsunori Takaboshi				SUG; 11									21st	0	1st	88
2022	Dallara SF19	Toyota RI4A	Y	19	(Japan) Yuhi Sekiguchi	FUJ; 4	FUJ; 6	SUZ; 11	AUT; 16	SUG; 15	**FUJ**; Ret	MOT; 9	MOT; 1	SUZ; 6	SUZ; 11			7th	43	2nd	126
2022	Dallara SF19	Toyota RI4A	Y	20	(Japan) Ryo Hirakawa	FUJ; 1	FUJ; 2	SUZ; 7	AUT; 1	SUG; 7	FUJ; Ret	MOT; Ret	MOT; 2	SUZ; 9	SUZ; 5			3rd	87	2nd	126
2023	Dallara SF23	Toyota RI4A	Y	19	(Japan) Yuhi Sekiguchi	FUJ; 11	FUJ; 13	SUZ; 19	AUT; 18	SUG; Ret	FUJ; 20	MOT; Ret	SUZ; 12	SUZ; 16				21st	0	5th	58
2023	Dallara SF23	Toyota RI4A	Y	20	(Japan) Ryo Hirakawa	FUJ; 3	FUJ; 21†	SUZ; 3	AUT; 5	SUG; 11	FUJ; 4	MOT; 2	SUZ; 7	SUZ; 6				5th	58	5th	58
2024	Dallara SF23	Toyota RI4A	Y	19	(France) Théo Pourchaire	SUZ; 18												25th	0	8th	9
2024	Dallara SF23	Toyota RI4A	Y	19	(United Kingdom) Ben Barnicoat		AUT; 13											23rd	0	8th	9
2024	Dallara SF23	Toyota RI4A	Y	19	(Japan) Hibiki Taira			SUG; 17	FUJ; 9				SUZ; Ret	SUZ; 17				17th	2	8th	9
2024	Dallara SF23	Toyota RI4A	Y	19	(Netherlands) Nyck de Vries					MOT; 13	FUJ; 11	FUJ; 11						18th	0	8th	9
2024	Dallara SF23	Toyota RI4A	Y	20	(Japan) Yuji Kunimoto	SUZ; Ret	AUT; 19†	SUG; 7	FUJ; 6	MOT; 11	FUJ; 13	FUJ; 15	SUZ; 13	SUZ; 12				13th	7	8th	9
2025	Dallara SF23	Toyota RI4A	Y	19	(Denmark) Oliver Rasmussen	SUZ; WD	SUZ; WD			AUT; 14	FUJ; 16	FUJ; 13	SUG; 17	FUJ; 17	SUZ; 19	SUZ; 21	SUZ; 19	21st	0	11th	0
2025	Dallara SF23	Toyota RI4A	Y	19	(Japan) Seita Nonaka	SUZ; 17	SUZ; 19											17th	0	11th	0
2025	Dallara SF23	Toyota RI4A	Y	19	(Japan) Rikuto Kobayashi			MOT; 16	MOT; Ret									24th	0	11th	0
2025	Dallara SF23	Toyota RI4A	Y	20	(Japan) Mitsunori Takaboshi	SUZ; 12	SUZ; 20	MOT; 15	MOT; 19	AUT; 11	FUJ; 17	FUJ; 14	SUG; 11	FUJ; 16	SUZ; 18	SUZ; 19	SUZ; 13	19th	0	11th	0

== See also ==
- Nissan
- Kazuyoshi Hoshino
- Calsonic Kansei
