= March 86G =

Sports Prototype race car

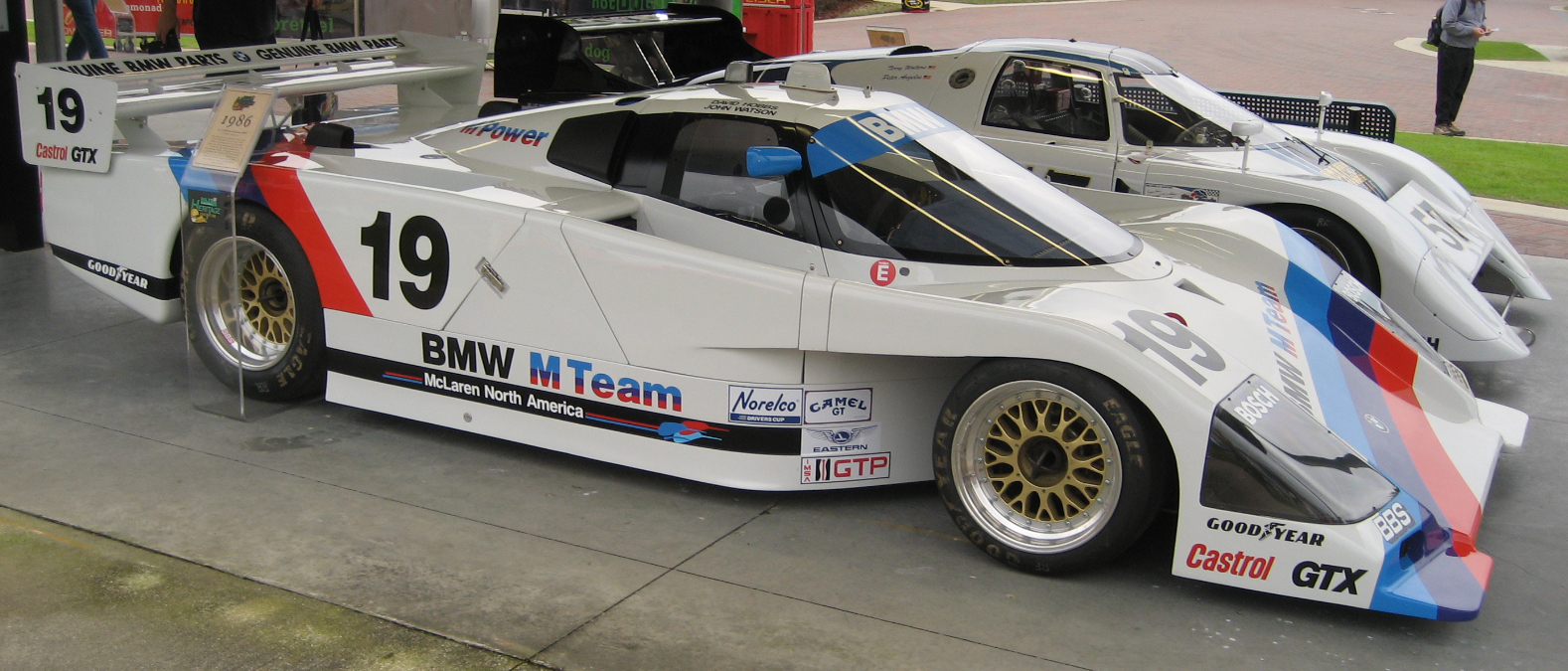
- Category: IMSA GTP Group C
- Constructor: March Engineering
- Designer(s): Gordon Coppuck
- Predecessor: March 85G
- Successor: March 87G

Technical specifications
- Chassis: Aluminium monocoque, reinforced at key points with carbon fibre honeycomb, and a steel tube sub frame
- Engine: BMW M12/14 2 litre turbo straight-four, Buick 3 liter turbo V6, Buick 4.5-liter naturally-aspirated V6, Nissan VG30ET V6 mid engine, longitudinally mounted
- Transmission: Hewland 5 Speed LSD

Competition history
- Notable entrants: BMW North America, Nismo Racing, Momo Course, Hoshino Racing, Hasemi Motorsport, HP Racing, Conte Racing, Person Racing Team
- Notable drivers: Davy Jones; John Andretti; David Hobbs; John Watson
- Debut: 1986 Grand Prix of Miami
Races	Wins	Poles	F/Laps
55	1	5	1
- Teams' Championships: 0
- Constructors' Championships: 0
- Drivers' Championships: 0

The March 86G was a Group C and IMSA GTP sports racing car built by March Engineering. Built as simply a chassis with no engine, it was branded as one of three cars, the BMW GTP, the Buick Hawk or the Nissan R86V depending on which engine was placed in the chassis and which team was running it. There were a number of subtle bodywork changes to reflect the manufacturer which ran the car.

11 of the chassis were built, four sold to BMW, five to Nissan and a remaining three were sold to private teams affiliated with Buick. The car was used from 1986 until early 1989, scoring one race victory in the hands of the BMW team in 1986, and 5 pole positions in the hands of Nissan.

Unlike normally done with yearly-updated racing chassis, the 86G found a lot of use after the 87G model was released, the Buick Hawk being developed in 1987, the Pearson Racing Team, Hoshino Racing Team and Hasemi Motorsport using their older R86V cars in the 1987 JSPC season, the Person Racing Team updating the car to a March 88S in 1988 and Nissan Motorsport themselves modifying two cars to R88C designation in 1989, with varying degrees of longevity and success.

Chassis	Car Brand(s)	Years Ran	Championship
86G-1	BMW GTP	1986	IMSA Camel GT
86G-2	BMW GTP	1986	IMSA Camel GT
86G-3	BMW GTP	1986	IMSA Camel GT
86G-4	BMW GTP - Buick Hawk	1986, 1987, 1988	IMSA Camel GT
86G-5	Nissan R86V - Nissan R88C	1986–87, 1989	JSPC - WEC
86G-6	Nissan R86V	1986	JSPC - WEC
86G-7	Nissan R86V - Nissan R88C	1986–87, 1989	JSPC - WEC
86G-8	Nissan R86V - March 88S	1986–88	JSPC - WEC
86G-9	BMW GTP - Buick Hawk	1988	IMSA Camel GT
86G-10	BMW GTP - Buick Hawk	1988	IMSA Camel GT
86G-11	Buick Hawk	1987–88	IMSA Camel GT

== BMW GTP ==
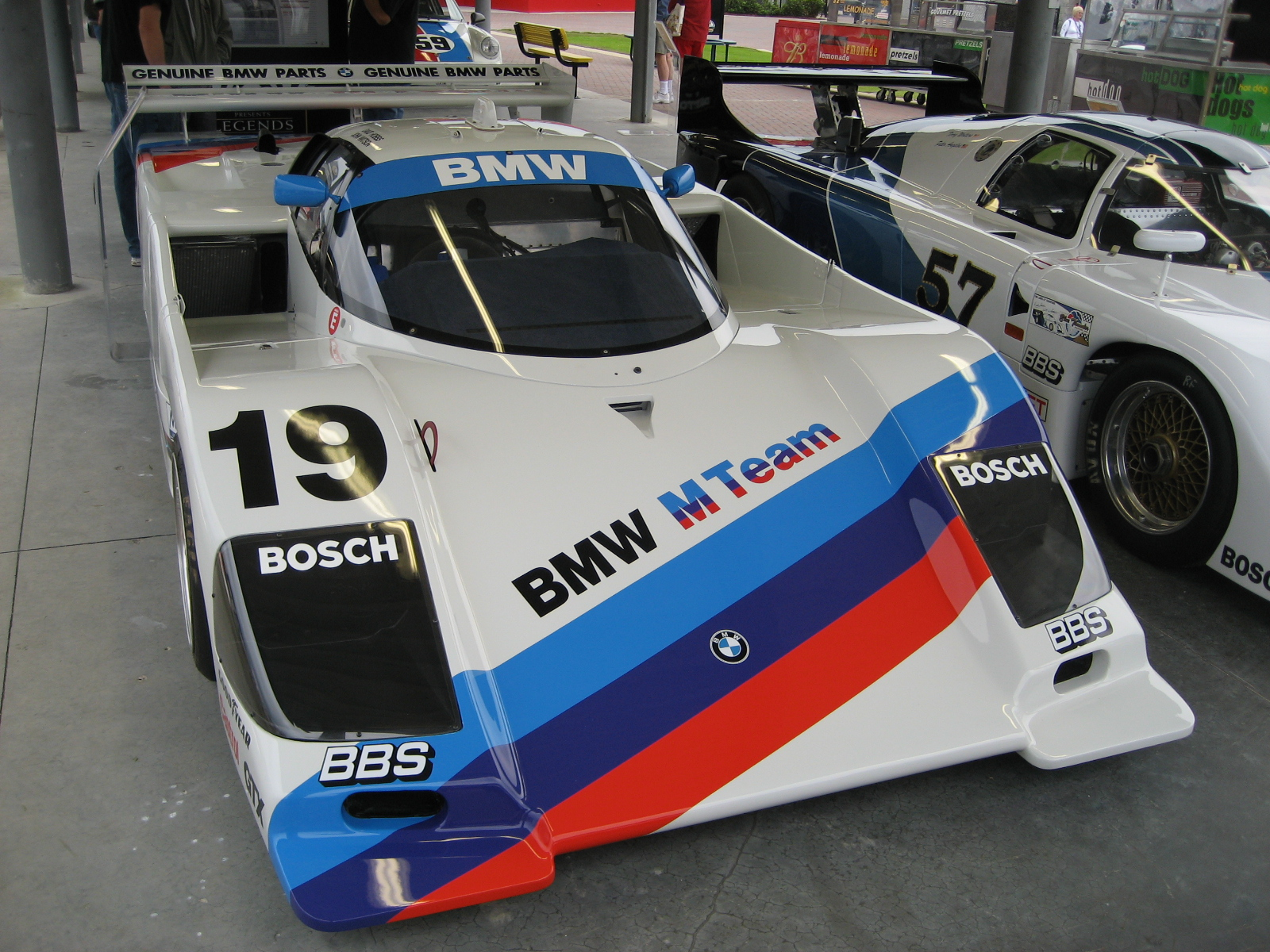
BMW GTP

Chassis 86G-1 through 86G-4 were purchased by the BMW IMSA team and renamed the BMW GTP. The cars were entered in the 1986 IMSA GTP season and were driven by Davey Jones and John Andretti in car number 18 and John Watson and David Hobbs in car number 19.

BMW North America attempted to debut the car at the 1986 24 Hours of Daytona, which opened the IMSA GT season; however, a fire during a Road Atlanta test left the only completed car too badly damaged to race. Instead, the BMW GTP made its debut at the Grand Prix of Miami, with Davy Jones and John Andretti driving one car, whilst David Hobbs partnered John Watson in the other. Although the Jones/Andretti car crashed out after 41 laps, resulting in the pair being classified in 25th, Hobbs and Watson brought their car home in ninth, having completed 122 laps. At the 12 Hours of Sebring, BMW North America attempted to run three cars, but they withdrew after Bobby Rahal's car was involved in a big accident. Only one car was entered at the Grand Prix of Atlanta, which Watson drove; the car lasted just one lap before retiring, resulting in Watson being classified 23rd overall, and 15th in the GTP category. Following the stream of mechanical failures experienced by both the BMW GTP and the Brabham BT55 F1 cars, BMW withdrew from the Lime Rock Grand Prix. They returned for the Watkins Glen Grand Prix, with the same two-car entry that had competed at the Grand Prix of Miami; this time, both cars held together, with Jones and Andretti taking fifth, a lap ahead of Watson and Hobbs, who took sixth.

At the Portland Grand Prix, Andretti retired after 39 laps, and was classified in 20th overall, and 16th in the GTP category; however, Watson and Hobbs took fourth overall, and finished on the lead lap. Fortunes for the two pairs of drivers would reverse at the California Grand Prix; Watson and Hobbs retired after 59 laps, and were classified 18th overall, and 14th in the GTP category, whilst Andretti and Jones took fifth overall, again finishing on the same lap as the leader. However, the Road America 500 saw a dramatic disintegration of the team's recent form; Jones crashed out after just two laps, and was classified 60th and last overall (16th in class), whilst Watson and Hobbs experienced a fuel system failure after 71 laps, and were classified in 43rd overall, and 12th in class. At the New York 500, Watson and Hobbs retired after 67 laps, and were classified in 21st, and 11th in the GTP category; however, Jones and Andretti won the race by just over 24 seconds, and took the fastest lap in the process. The penultimate round of the season, which was the Columbus Grand Prix, saw both cars retire within the space of four laps; Jones and Andretti after 70 laps, which saw them classified 26th overall, and 15th in the GTP category, whilst Watson and Hobbs lasted the extra four laps, and were classified two places ahead overall and in class. Things improved at the Daytona Finale, which was the final round of the IMSA season; Jones and Andretti lasted for 83 laps before retiring, and were classified in 20th overall, and tenth in the GTP category, whilst Watson and Hobbs finished the race and were classified ninth overall, and seventh in class, after 91 laps. In the driver's championship, Andretti was the highest classified BMW GTP driver; he finished 22nd, with 37 points, whilst Jones took 25th, and Hobbs and Watson shared 28th. However, BMW withdrew from the IMSA GTP series at the end of the season. The car's career had not quite ended, however; BMW entered two cars at the opening round of the ADAC Würth Supercup season in 1987, which was held at the Nürburgring; however, they never actually competed in the race, and the BMW GTP was never used again.

Chassis 86G-1 earned the only race victory for a March 86G at the Watkins Glen 500 Kilometers, 86G-2 having its best finish of 4th at Portland. 86G-3 never finished a race and 86G-4 never appeared at a race meeting as a BMW GTP, being sold to Gianpiero Moretti in 1987 and being rebranded as a Buick Hawk, before finally ending up in the hands of the HP Racing team in 1988.

== Nissan R86V ==
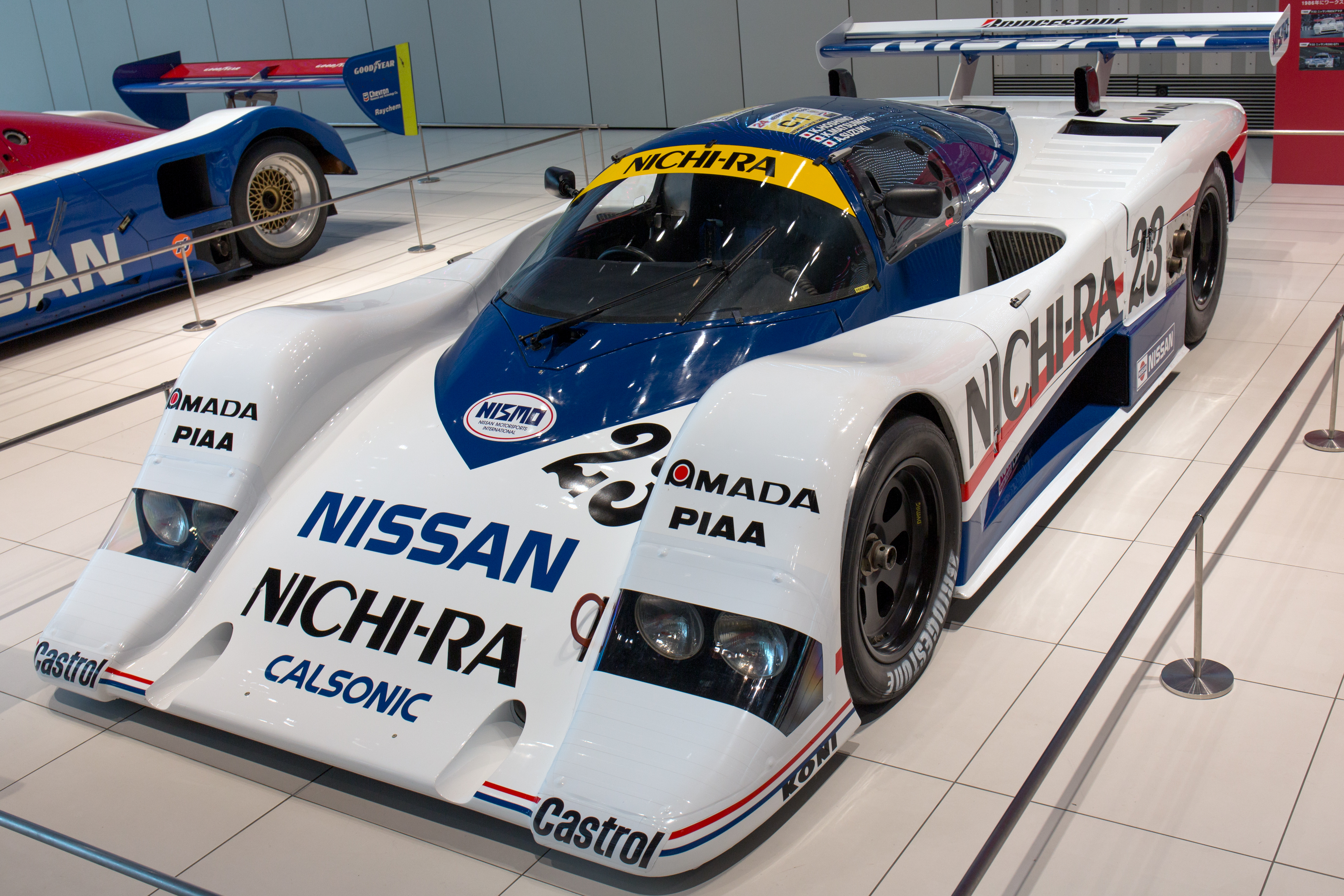
Nissan R86V chassis 86G-5

Nissan had purchased chassis 86G-5 through 86G-8 and renamed them to Nissan R86V. 86G-5 was given initially to the Hoshino Racing team, though leased to the Nissan factory team for Le Mans in 1986, 86G-6 and 86G-7 being run by the factory Nissan team, with 86G-7 being sold to Hasemi Motorsport at the end of 1986 and 86G-8 was owned by the Pearson Racing Team.

The first race for the R86V was at the 500 km of Suzuka, entered by the lone Hoshino Racing Chassis 86G-5. The car caught fire and didn't start the race. The Person Racing Team car managed to qualify 10th and finish 5th in their first race, the 1000 km of Fuji, again, the only Nissan car to enter the event. Nissan Motorsport bought the 86G-5 Chassis for one race, the 24 hours of Le Mans 1986, failing to finish with gearbox failure after qualifying a distant 24th on the grid. Pearson Racing and Hoshino Racing both brought a car each to the Fuji 500 Mile race, the Person chassis 86G-8 qualifying 8th and finishing 12th and the Hoshino Racing car earning the pole, but retiring due to tire failure. The Hoshino car would gain its second pole position in a row at the Suzuka 1000 km, with the Person car qualifying 2nd on the grid, as well as the factory-backed Nismo Sport car (Chassis 86G-6) gaining 8th on the grid. Despite this, neither the Hoshino or Person cars nor the Nissan factory run car managed to finish the race, both the Nismo Sport and Hoshino cars retiring with clutch failures, the Person car having tire troubles. The Fuji 1000 km saw the streak of pole positions come to an end, yet also the streak of failing to finish a race coming to an end too, with the Hoshino car qualifying 4th and finishing 10th, the Nismo Sport factory car qualifying 5th and finishing 11th and the Person car qualifying 9th and suffering an engine failure. At the 500 km Fuji race, the last round of the 1986 season, the three cars managed to once again dominate the front row of the grid in qualifying, with the Nismo factory car taking pole, the Hoshino car scoring 2nd and the Person car qualifying 4th, though none of the three cars could finish this race either, with two transmission failures for the Hoshino and Nismo cars and a brake failure on the Person racing car.

At the end of the 1986 season, Nissan's works Nismo team would abandon their R86V chassis, selling 86G-7 to the Hasemi Motorsport team. The Person team and Hoshino Racing Teams persevered into 1987 with their 86G's chassis, the Hoshino and Hasemi teams campaigning their older 86G-based cars alongside more modern 87G-based cars, dropping their older cars early in the season. Person Racing and Hasemi Motorsports both entered the first round of the 1987 JSPC season, the Person car qualifying 4th and retiring after an oil leak and the Hasemi car qualifying 7th and finishing 8th. The Hasemi Motorsport 86G-7 was retired from competition after this race, the team purchasing a R87E and campaigning that for the rest of the season. At the Fuji 1000 km, Hoshino Racing returned, joined by the Pearson team, the Hoshino car qualifying a distant 24th but rallying back to an 8th-place finish and the Person racing car qualifying 9th and falling out of the race with suspension problems. This would be the last time the Hoshino team would run their 86G-5 chassis, switching to an R87E like the Hasemi Motorsport team had done for the rest of the season. Chassis 86G-8 was brought to Le Mans for 1987, entered as the Italya Sports team. The car was 5th fastest in Le Mans testing, qualifying 24th on the grid in the race and failing to finish with accident damage. The Person Racing Team returned to Japan, the only team to do with an R86V. They entered their car into the final three races of the year, finishing all three races and earning two pole positions at the final two Fuji rounds, finishing a best of 4th in the Fuji 500 Kilometers to close the year. March-Nissan (grouping together the works of the R86V and the R87E) came 4th in Manufacturers points, with 22 overall, defeating Jaguar and losing out to Mazda, Toyota and Porsche.

In the course of its running, the car earned 5 pole positions, though the highest result it could obtain was 4th in the last race it ran as a Nissan R86V

=== Conversion to March 88S ===
Starting in 1988, the Person Racing Team began to modify their Nissan R86V in an attempt to keep the car competitive. They made aerodynamic changes to both front and rear sections of the car and expanded the Nissan VG30ET V6 engine from 2.9 liters to 3.2 liters. The finished vehicle was rebranded a March 88S. A second 87G was modified in the same way and introduced later in the season.

The Person Team entered their new March 88S in the first round of the 1988 JSPC Season, the 1988 500 Kilometers. It qualified a strong 3rd, though failed to finish the race, dropping out with a suspension failure. The next race it attempted was the 500 km of Suzuka, qualifying 10th and once again failing to make the finish of the event due to a transmission failure. Their fortunes improved in the Fuji 1000 km, qualifying 10th again, but managing to finish 9th. This chassis was taken to Le Mans, along with a 87G-based car, the 86G earning a 25th place starting spot and failing to finish due to engine failure. An 8th-place finish from a 6th place starting spot was earned at the Fuji 500 miles. The Suzuka 1000 km was started by the car in 5th position, though the car retired in an off-track excursion. For the final round of the 1988 season, the Fuji 1000 km, the old 86G-8-based 88S was campaigned alongside another 88S built from a March 88G, which in turn was cobbled together from a March 87G. Neither cars finished, the newer car qualifying better however.

The March 88S would continue to be campaigned throughout the 1989 season, though made up of cars based on the 88G chassis.

=== Conversion to Nissan R88C ===
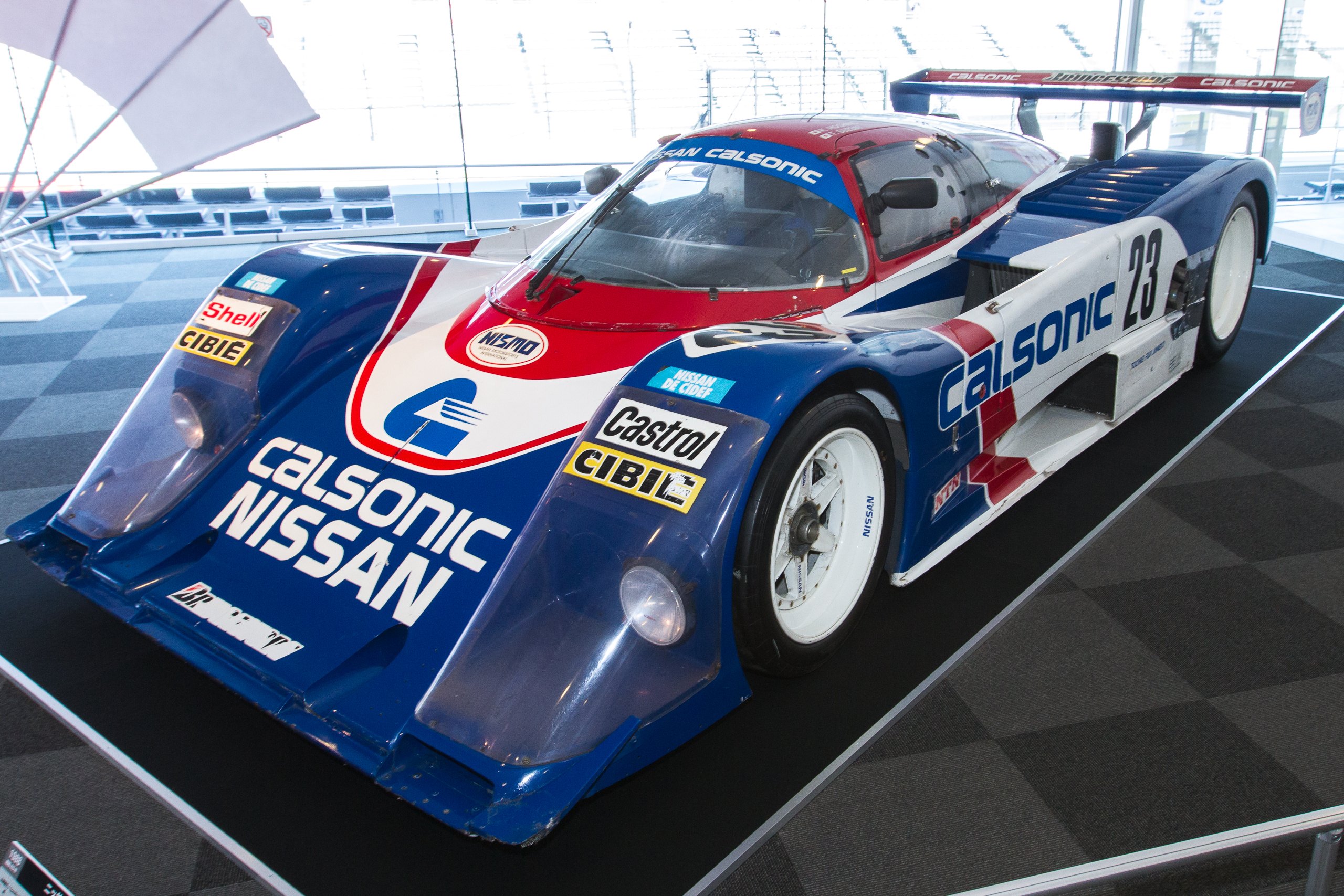
Nissan R88C chassis R88C-7, previously 86G-7

In 1988, Nissan had upgraded their 87G's to R88C designation. However, in 1989 they, in partnership with Lola, began work on the Nissan R89C. This car was not completed before the JSPC and WSC seasons began for 1989. For this reason, Nissan purchased the 86G-5 chassis from the Hoshino Racing Team and purchased the 86G-7 chassis back from the Hasemi Motorsports team. The two cars were rebranded as Nissan R88C's and entered them in the 1989 JSPC Championship. The chassis were renamed R88C-7 and R88C-5 respectively. These cars using the 86G base were subtly different from the 87G base cars, namely using a twin-turbo version of the VRH30 V8, soon to be used full-time in the R89C.

The first race the R88C was entered in was the Fuji 500 Kilometers. R88C-5 qualified 2nd and the R88C-7 qualified a distant 15th. Neither car managed to finish, though despite this, R88C-7 was scored in 8th despite retiring with electrical failure, R88C-5 went out with engine trouble. The next race they entered was the World Sportscar Championship race at Suzuka, with R88C-5 qualifying 7th and R88C-7 in 6th. This time, both cars managed to finish, R88C-5 earning a very respectable 4th place, especially for a three-year-old design and R88C-7 finished in 11th. In the last race their ran, the JSPC Fuji 1000 Kilometers, the two Nissan R88C's dominated the front row of the grid, with R88C-7 on pole and R88C-5 alongside in 2nd place. Once again, both cars finished the race, with R88C-7 managing a podium finish of 3rd, the best achieved by any of the Nissan 86G-based cars and R88C-5 finished 6th. Despite the strong performances the two R88C cars were putting in, they were retired after the race and Nissan used the new R89C for the rest of that JSPC and WSC season.

== Buick Hawk ==
In 1987, the Conte Racing Team purchased chassis 86G-11. This was fitted with a 3-litre Buick V6 turbo. This was the first iteration of the March 86G-based Buick Hawk. The Conte team had used older March chassis for Buick Hawk cars in 1986.

The car missed the 1987 Daytona 24 hours and ran its first race in the 1987 3 hours of Miami. The car qualified in second position, but had an accident during the race and the chassis had to be repaired. As a result of this, the Conte team missed the next race of the season, the Road Atlanta 500 Kilometers. The Conte team then participated to the Laguna Seca 300 Kilometres. The car qualified second and failed to finish once again, this time with an engine failure. The Conte team managed to enter 86-11 into one last race, the 150 Laps of Lime Rock, qualifying 6th and earning a 4th-place finish. This would be the very last race for Conte racing and 86G-11 was sold to Gianpiero Moretti.

Within two months, Moretti's Momo team would bring the 86G-11 chassis to round 11 of the championship, the 300 km of Portland, qualifying the car 6th and finishing 9th. The car arrived at the Sears Point 1000 km, qualifying 8th and earning 6th-place finish. The former BMW-owned chassis 86G-4 was then bought by Moretti as a second car. It had its BMW engine removed and replaced with the 3 liter Buick V6. The car started the 1987 Road America 500 miles, qualifying 10th and retiring in 37th after an accident, the first retirement for Moretti's Momo Team. Chassis 86G-4 was not used again by Moretti's team. 86G-11 was brought to the 3 hours of San Antonio, qualifying 5th and failing to finish. The car wasn't brought to the series final round, the 2 hours of Del Mar.

For the start of 1988, Moretti's Momo Course team had purchased two chassis from BMW, 86G-9 and 86G-10 as a two-car team. 86G-10 was fitted with the 3 Litre Buick V6 turbo as used from 1987 and 86G-9 was then fitted with a naturally aspirated 4.5 liter V6. Both cars arrived at Daytona for the 24 hours, with 86G-10 qualifying 18th and retiring in 74th place with a failure in the oil system and 86G-09 qualifying a dismal 28th and retiring in 53rd with engine problems. Their luck got slightly better in the 3 hours of Miami, with 86G-10 qualifying 18th and finishing 12th and 86G-09 qualifying 22nd and failing to finish in 26th. Three Buick Hawks arrived for the Sebring 12 hours, 86G-9 and 86G-10 from Moretti's team and the 86G-4 being sold from Moretti to the HP Racing team after its accident at the Road America 500 Miles in 1987. 86G-10 started 13th and 86G-9 started 11th for Momo Course and the HP Racing 86G-4 started in 14th. Despite earning a fairly respectable qualifying position, the HP Racing team's 12 hours were marred due to the death of Bob Copeman in a GTU Porsche 911 they had entered during the preliminary sessions for the race. None of the three Buick Hawk cars managed to make it to the finish, though the HP Racing car finished the best of the three, 39th after a fuel system problem, besting the 86G-10 which finished 49th after engine failure and 86G-09 which came in 64th place after losing oil pressure. This was the last appearance of 86-04.

For the next round of the championship at Road Atlanta, Moretti began to make aerodynamic modifications to their cars, first implemented on 86G-10. The modified car and 86G-09 were both brought to the Road America 500 kilometres, with 86G-10 qualifying 9th and 86G-09 qualifying 16th. Neither car finished the race, with 86G-10 placing higher of the two, 28th compared to 31st. This would be the last race the 86G-09 would start. The modifications carried out to 86G-10 were done to 86G-09, and was brought with the former to the West Palm Beach 3 hours. 86G-09 would be withdrawn from the race before qualifying and 86G-10 would start the race from 16th, failing to finish yet again, this time scored in 21st place. 86G-09 was never seen at a race meeting again.

Moretti then concentrated on simply running the one-car operation with 86G-10, taking the car to the Lime Rock 150 laps, qualifying 11th and failing to finish the race once more, scored in 20th place. Momo Course's 4-race DNF streak was broken with a drive from 14th on the grid to 10th overall in the Mid-Ohio 500 Kilometres. 86G-10 managed another finish from the Watkins Glen 500 Kilometres, qualifying 11th and placing 9th. The teams run of good luck would then run out, suffering a DNF and a 52nd place from a 10th place qualifying result at the Road America 500 Kilometres. The next two races, the Portland 300 Kilometres and Sears Point 300 Kilometres both ended in retirements for the 86G-10 chassis. The Sears Point race would be the last for a Buick Hawk and the last for 86G-10. The Momo Course team would purchase a Porsche 962 for the rest of the season, racing it alongside the 86G-10 car at Sears Point.

The Buick Hawk's best race result was the 4th place achieved by the Conte team in their last race at Lime Rock Park in 1987.
