= 1985 Japanese Formula 2 Championship =

Racing series during 1985

1985 Japanese Formula Two Championship

Seasons
- ← 1984 1986 →

The 1985 Japanese Formula Two Championship was contested over 8 rounds. 15 teams, 23 drivers, 5 chassis and 3 engines competed.

== Teams and drivers ==
Team	#	Driver	Chassis	Engine	Rounds
Heros Racing	1	(Japan) Satoru Nakajima	March 85J	Honda	All
Hoshino Racing	2	(Japan) Kazuyoshi Hoshino	March 85J	Honda	All
Speed Star Wheel Racing Team	3	(Sweden) Eje Elgh	March 842	BMW	1-3
Speed Star Wheel Racing Team	3	(Japan) Yoshiyasu Tachi	March 842	BMW	4-8
Speed Star Wheel Racing Team	5	(Japan) Masahiro Hasemi	March 85J	BMW	All
Speed Star Wheel Racing Team	6	(Japan) Yoshiyasu Tachi	March 85J	Honda	1-3
Speed Star Wheel Racing Team	6	(Sweden) Eje Elgh	March 85J	Honda	4-8
Takuya Racing	7	(United Kingdom) Geoff Lees	March 85J	Yamaha	All
Team LeMans	8	(Japan) Keiji Matsumoto	March 85J	BMW	1-4
Team LeMans	8	(Japan) Keiji Matsumoto	March 85J	Yamaha	5-8
Gear Racing	9	(Japan) Akio Morimoto	March 842	BMW	1-5, 7
Team Nova	10	(Brazil) Roberto Moreno	March 842	Honda	4-8
Team Nova	11	(United Kingdom) Kenny Acheson	March 85J	Honda	All
Team Equipe	12	(Japan) Kengo Nakamoto	Maurer MM81	BMW	7-8
Tomei Racing	16	(Japan) Akira Hagiwara	March 85J	BMW	All
Takeshi Project Racing	17	(Japan) Hideshi Matsuda	March 832	BMW	All
Maribu Motorsport	18	(Japan) Hironobu Tatsumi	Ralt RH6/84	BMW	1
Maribu Motorsport	18	(Japan) Norimasa Sakamoto	Ralt RH6/84	BMW	4
Maribu Motorsport	18	(Japan) Osamu Nakako	Ralt RH6/84	BMW	5-8
Advan Sports Tomei	24	(Japan) Kenji Takahashi	March 85J	BMW	1-2, 4-8
Advan Sports Tomei	26	(Japan) Takao Wada	March 842	BMW	1-2, 4-8
Advan Sports Nova	25	(Japan) Kunimitsu Takahashi	March 85J	BMW	1-2, 4-8
Shimizu Racing	33	(Japan) Masatomo Shimizu	Ralt RH6/84	BMW	1
Shimizu Racing	33	(Japan) Masatomo Shimizu	March 842	BMW	4-5, 7-8
NC Speed	34	(Japan) Aguri Suzuki	March 842	BMW	6-8

== Results ==
Date	Round	Circuit	Winning driver	Winning team	Winning car
10/03/1985	Rd.1	Suzuka	(Japan) Keiji Matsumoto	Team LeMans	March-BMW 85J
21/04/1985	Rd.2	Fuji	(Japan) Satoru Nakajima	Heros Racing	March-Honda 85J
12/05/1985	Rd.3	Mine	(Japan) Satoru Nakajima	Heros Racing	March-Honda 85J
26/05/1985	Rd.4	Suzuka	(Japan) Satoru Nakajima	Heros Racing	March-Honda 85J
06/07/1985	Rd.5	Suzuka	(Japan) Kazuyoshi Hoshino	Hoshino Racing	March-Honda 85J
11/08/1985	Rd.6	Fuji	(United Kingdom) Kenny Acheson	Team Nova	March-Honda 85J
29/09/1985	Rd.7	Suzuka	(Japan) Satoru Nakajima	Heros Racing	March-Honda 85J
03/11/1985	Rd.8	Suzuka	(Japan) Satoru Nakajima	Heros Racing	March-Honda 85J

== Final point standings ==
=== Driver ===
For every race points were awarded: 20 points to the winner, 15 for runner-up, 12 for third place, 10 for fourth place, 8 for fifth place, 6 for sixth place, 4 for seventh place, 3 for eighth place, 2 for ninth place and 1 for tenth place. No additional points were awarded. The best six results count.

Place	Name	Country	Team	Chassis	Engine	(Japan)	(Japan)	(Japan)	(Japan)	(Japan)	(Japan)	(Japan)	(Japan)	Total Points
1	Satoru Nakajima	Japan	Heros Racing	March	Honda	15	20	20	20	15	15	20	20	115
2	Keiji Matsumoto	Japan	Team LeMans	March	BMW	20	6	-	12					67
2	Keiji Matsumoto	Japan	Team LeMans	March	Yamaha					2	6	8	15	67
3	Kenny Acheson	United Kingdom	Team Nova	March	Honda	10	12	6	-	8	20	10	3	66
4	Kazuyoshi Hoshino	Japan	Hoshino Racing	March	Honda	1	15	15	-	20	-	-	-	51
5	Eje Elgh	Sweden	Speed Star Wheel Racing Team	March	BMW	12	1	-						49
5	Eje Elgh	Sweden	Speed Star Wheel Racing Team	March	Honda				8	12	-	6	10	49
6	Geoff Lees	United Kingdom	Takuya Racing	March	Yamaha	-	-	12	-	6	-	12	12	42
7	Akira Hagiwara	Japan	Tomei Racing	March	BMW	8	10	4	10	-	-	4	4	40
8	Masahiro Hasemi	Japan	Speed Star Wheel Racing Team	March	BMW	3	-	10	15	4	3	-	2	37
9	Kenji Takahashi	Japan	Advan Sports Tomei	March	BMW	8	10		-	3	12	2	6	37
10	Yoshiyasu Tachi	Japan	Speed Star Wheel Racing Team	March	Honda	-	4	-						26
10	Yoshiyasu Tachi	Japan	Speed Star Wheel Racing Team	March	BMW				4	10	8	-	-	26
11	Roberto Moreno	Brazil	Team Nova	March	Honda				6	-	-	15	-	21
12	Takao Wada	Japan	Advan Sports Tomei	March	BMW	4	3		-	-	10	1	-	18
13	Kunimitsu Takahashi	Japan	Advan Sports Nova	March	BMW	2	-		3	-	4	-	8	17
14	Akio Morimoto	Japan	Gear Racing	March	BMW	-	2	8	-	-		-		10
15	Hideshi Matsuda	Japan	Takeshi Project Team	March	BMW	-	-	3	-	-	1	-	-	4
16	Aguri Suzuki	Japan	NC Speed	Lola	BMW							3	1	4
17	Osamu Nakako	Japan	Maribu Motorsport	Ralt	BMW					1	2	-	-	3
18	Masatomo Shimizu	Japan	Shimizu Racing	Ralt	BMW	-								2
18	Masatomo Shimizu	Japan	Shimizu Racing	March	BMW				2	-		-	-	2
19	Norimasa Sakamoto	Japan	Maribu Motorsport	Ralt	BMW				1					1

== Finishing results ==
R=retired NC=not classified DNS=did not start

Place	Name	Country	Team	Chassis	Engine	(Japan)	(Japan)	(Japan)	(Japan)	(Japan)	(Japan)	(Japan)	(Japan)
1	Satoru Nakajima	Japan	Heros Racing	March	Honda	2	1	1	1	2	2	1	1
2	Keiji Matsumoto	Japan	Team LeMans	March	BMW	1	6	R	3
2	Keiji Matsumoto	Japan	Team LeMans	March	Yamaha					9	5	6	2
3	Kenny Acheson	United Kingdom	Team Nova	March	Honda	4	3	6	R	3	2	12	3
4	Kazuyoshi Hoshino	Japan	Hoshino Racing	March	Honda	10	2	2	DNS	1	11	14	DNS
5	Eje Elgh	Sweden	Speed Star Wheel Racing Team	March	BMW	3	10	R
5	Eje Elgh	Sweden	Speed Star Wheel Racing Team	March	Honda				5	3	R	6	4
6	Geoff Lees	United Kingdom	Takuya Racing	March	Yamaha	R	R	3	11	6	R	3	3
7	Akira Hagiwara	Japan	Tomei Racing	March	BMW	5	4	7	4	DNS	12	7	7
8	Masahiro Hasemi	Japan	Speed Star Wheel Racing Team	March	BMW	8	R	4	2	7	8	11	9
9	Kenji Takahashi	Japan	Advan Sports Tomei	March	BMW	6	5		R	8	3	9	6
10	Yoshiyasu Tachi	Japan	Speed Star Wheel Racing Team	March	Honda	R	7	R
10	Yoshiyasu Tachi	Japan	Speed Star Wheel Racing Team	March	BMW				7	4	5	R	13
11	Roberto Moreno	Brazil	Team Nova	March	Honda				6	R	R	2	R
12	Takao Wada	Japan	Advan Sports Tomei	March	BMW	7	8		R	R	4	10	R
13	Kunimitsu Takahashi	Japan	Advan Sports Nova	March	BMW	9	11		8	R	7	12	5
14	Akio Morimoto	Japan	Gear Racing	March	BMW	11	9	5	NC	11		R
15	Hideshi Matsuda	Japan	Takeshi Project Team	March	BMW	R	12	8	12	R	10	R	R
16	Aguri Suzuki	Japan	NC Speed	Lola	BMW							8	10
17	Osamu Nakako	Japan	Maribu Motorsport	Ralt	BMW					10	9	R	R
18	Masatomo Shimizu	Japan	Shimizu Racing	Ralt	BMW	12
18	Masatomo Shimizu	Japan	Shimizu Racing	March	BMW				9	12		R	12
19	Norimasa Sakamoto	Japan	Maribu Motorsport	Ralt	BMW				10
-	Kengo Nakamoto	Japan	Team Equipe	Maurer	BMW							13	11
-	Hironobu Tatsumi	Japan	Maribu Motorsport	Ralt	BMW	13
