= 1986 Japanese Formula Two Championship =

Seasons
- ← 1985 1987 →

The 1986 Japanese Formula Two Championship was contested over 8 rounds. 12 teams, 19 drivers, 3 chassis, 3 engines, and 3 tires competed.

== Teams and drivers ==
Team	#	Driver	Chassis	Engine	Tyre	Rounds
Heros Racing	1	(Japan) Satoru Nakajima	March 86J	Honda	B	All
Hoshino Racing	2	(Japan) Kazuyoshi Hoshino	March 86J	Honda	B	All
Speed Box Motor Sports	3	(Sweden) Eje Elgh	March 86J	Yamaha	D	All
Speed Star Wheel Racing Team	5	(Japan) Masahiro Hasemi	March 85J; March 86J	Yamaha	D	All
Speed Star Wheel Racing Team	6	(Japan) Yoshiyasu Tachi	March 86J	Yamaha	D	All
Takuya Racing	7	(United Kingdom) Geoff Lees	March 85J; March 86J	Yamaha	B	All
Takuya Racing	11	(Japan) Aguri Suzuki	March 85J	Yamaha	B	8
Team LeMans	8	(Japan) Keiji Matsumoto	March 86J	Yamaha	B	All
Team LeMans	18	(Japan) Akio Morimoto	March 86J	Yamaha	B	8
Team Nova	9	(New Zealand) Mike Thackwell	March 85J; March 86J	Honda	B	All
Takeshi Project Racing	10	(Japan) Hideshi Matsuda	March 85J	BMW	Y	1-2, 4-8
Team Equipe	12	(Japan) Kengo Nakamoto	Maurer MM81	BMW	D	1, 4
Leyton House Racing	16	(Japan) Akira Hagiwara	March 86J	Yamaha	B	1
Leyton House Racing	16	(Italy) Ivan Capelli	March 86J	Yamaha	B	5-6, 8
Leyton House Racing	16	(Japan) Masanori Sekiya	March 86J	Yamaha	B	7
Advan Sports Racing; Team JPS Advan; Advan Sports Shigeyama Racing	24	(Japan) Kenji Takahashi	March 86J	Yamaha	Y	All
Advan Sports Racing; Team JPS Advan; Advan Sports Shigeyama Racing	25	(Japan) Kunimitsu Takahashi	March 86J	Yamaha	Y	All
Advan Sports Racing; Team JPS Advan; Advan Sports Shigeyama Racing	26	(Japan) Takao Wada	March 86J	Yamaha	Y	All
Shimizu Racing	33	(Japan) Masatomo Shimizu	March 85J	Yamaha	D	1-2, 4, 7-8

Akira Hagiwara was killed in a testing accident at Sportsland SUGO on 7 April, two weeks before the second round of the season.

== Results ==
Date	Round	Circuit	Winning driver	Winning team	Winning car
09/03/1986	Rd.1	Suzuka	(Japan) Keiji Matsumoto	Team LeMans	March-Yamaha 86J
20/04/1986	Rd.2	Fuji	(United Kingdom) Geoff Lees	Takuya Racing	March-Yamaha 86J
11/05/1986	Rd.3	Mine	(Japan) Keiji Matsumoto	Team LeMans	March-Yamaha 86J
25/05/1986	Rd.4	Suzuka	(Japan) Satoru Nakajima	Heros Racing	March-Honda 86J
06/07/1986	Rd.5	Suzuka	(Japan) Kazuyoshi Hoshino	Hoshino Racing	March-Honda 86J
10/08/1986	Rd.6	Fuji	(New Zealand) Mike Thackwell	Team Nova	March-Honda 86J
28/09/1986	Rd.7	Suzuka	(Japan) Kazuyoshi Hoshino	Hoshino Racing	March-Honda 86J
02/11/1986	Rd.8	Suzuka	(Japan) Kazuyoshi Hoshino	Hoshino Racing	March-Honda 86J

== Final point standings ==
=== Driver ===
For every race points were awarded: 20 points to the winner, 15 for runner-up, 12 for third place, 10 for fourth place, 8 for fifth place, 6 for sixth place, 4 for seventh place, 3 for eighth place, 2 for ninth place and 1 for tenth place. No additional points were awarded. The best six results count. Five drivers had a point deduction, which are given in ().

Place	Name	Country	Team	Chassis	Engine	(Japan)	(Japan)	(Japan)	(Japan)	(Japan)	(Japan)	(Japan)	(Japan)	Total points
1	Satoru Nakajima	Japan	Heros Racing	March	Honda	15	15	(10)	20	15	12	15	(10)	92
2	Kazuyoshi Hoshino	Japan	Hoshino Racing	March	Honda	-	12	-	15	20	-	20	20	87
3	Geoff Lees	United Kingdom	Takuya Racing	March	Yamaha	-	20	12	12	10	10	(1)	15	79
4	Keiji Matsumoto	Japan	Cabin Racing	March	Yamaha	20	8	20	8	8	8	-	-	72
5	Mike Thackwell	New Zealand	Team Nova	March	Honda	10	(3)	6	(4)	12	20	12	8	68
6	Eje Elgh	Sweden	Speed Box Motor Sports	March	Yamaha	8	(1)	15	2	3	(1)	10	4	42
7	Ivan Capelli	Italy	Leyton House Racing	March	Yamaha	-	-	-	-	6	15	-	12	33
8	Takao Wada	Japan	Advan Sports Racing	March	Yamaha	12	10	2	6	-	2	-	-	32
9	Masahiro Hasemi	Japan	Speed Star Wheel Racing Team	March	Yamaha	4	4	8	-	4	4	4	(2)	28
10	Kunimitsu Takahashi	Japan	Team Nova	March	Honda	6	-	3	3	2	-	8	-	22
11	Yoshiyasu Tachi	Japan	Speed Star Wheel Racing Team	March	Yamaha	-	2	-	10	-	6	-	3	21
12	Kenji Takahashi	Japan	Advan Sports Racing	March	Yamaha	-	6	4	1	1	3	-	1	16
13	Masanori Sekiya	Japan	Leyton House Racing	March	Yamaha	-	-	-	-	-	-	6	-	6
	Masatomo Shimizu	Japan	Shimizu Racing	March	Yamaha	3	-	-	-	-	-	3	-	6
	Aguri Suzuki	Japan	Takuya Racing	March	Yamaha	-	-	-	-	-	-	-	6	6
16	Hideshi Matsuda	Japan	Takeshi Project Team	March	BMW	2	-	-	-	-	-	2	-	4
