= BMW GTP =

IMSA GTP sports prototype race car

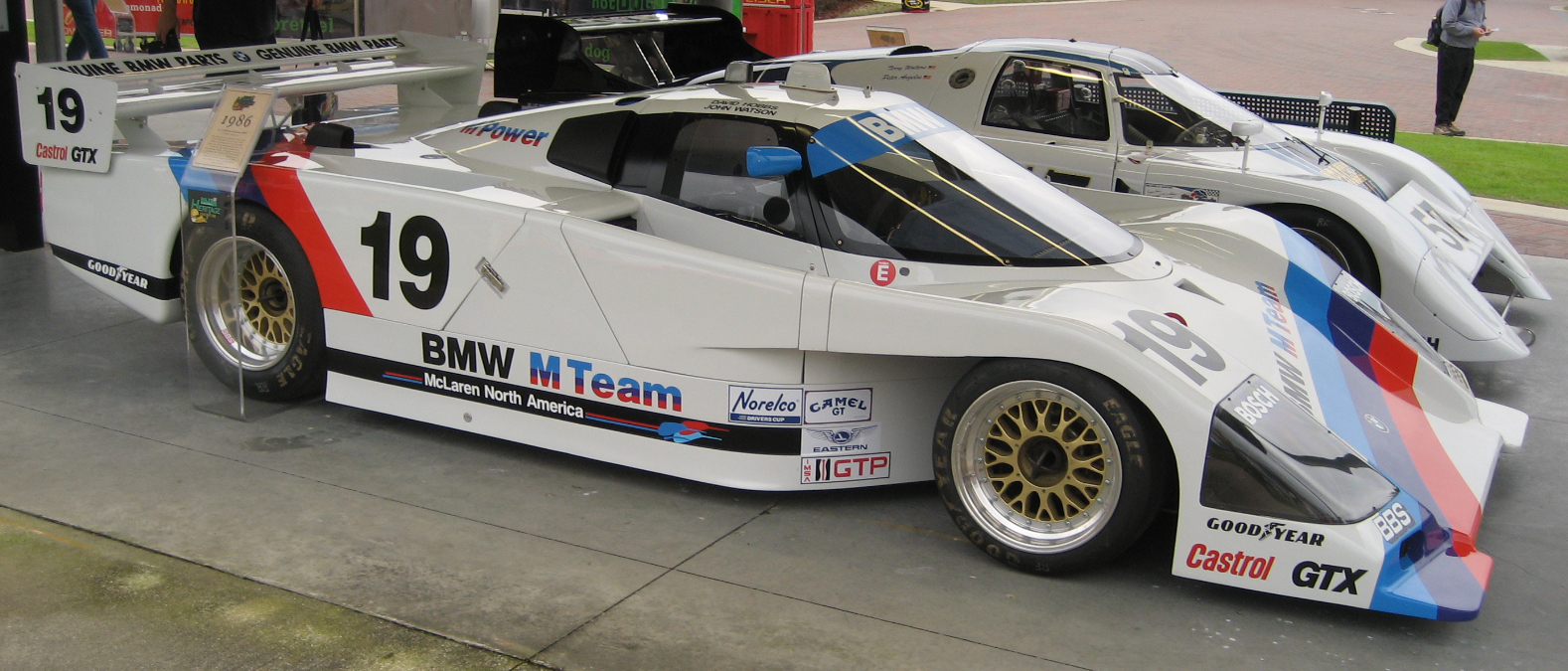
- Category: IMSA GTP
- Constructor: BMW/March Engineering
- Designers: Gordon Coppuck; Manfred Rennen
- Predecessor: March 86G

Technical specifications
- Chassis: Aluminium monocoque, reinforced at key points with carbon fibre honeycomb, and a steel tube sub frame
- Length: 4,775 mm (188.0 in)
- Width: 1,994 mm (78.5 in)
- Height: 1,067 mm (42.0 in)
- Wheelbase: 2,667 mm (105.0 in)
- Engine: BMW M12/14 2,000 cc (122.0 cu in) 16 valve, DOHC I4, turbocharged, mid engine, longitudinally mounted
- Transmission: Hewland 5 Speed LSD
- Weight: 908 kg (2,001.8 lb)
- Tires: Goodyear Eagle

Competition history
- Notable entrants: BMW North America
- Notable drivers: Davy Jones; John Andretti; David Hobbs; John Watson
- Debut: 1986 Grand Prix of Miami
Races	Wins	Poles	F/Laps
10 (12 entries)	1	0	1
- Teams' Championships: 0
- Constructors' Championships: 0
- Drivers' Championships: 0

The BMW GTP was an IMSA GTP sports racing car built by BMW in 1986. Four March 86Gs were rebuilt by BMW North America into the BMW GTP, and fitted with a Formula One-derived BMW M12/14 turbocharged straight-four engine. Like the F1 cars that used the M12 engine, the BMW GTPs were fragile, and often retired from races; however, when they did complete a race, the BMW GTP was usually classified in the overall top ten. For longevity purposes in endurance races, it usually ran around 800 hp (597 kW; 811 PS). However, in qualifying trim, 1,400 hp (1,044 kW; 1,419 PS) was feasible; combined with the aerodynamics and the drag coefficient reached 0.21 as its top speed reached 450 km/h.

== Design and development ==
In 1986, BMW North America decided to enter the GTP category of the IMSA GT Championship. Using a modified March 86G chassis (the company had purchased four of these), a modified version of the turbocharged BMW M12/14 Formula One engine was fitted. Unlike the 1.5-litre capacity used in Formula One, the GTP used a 2-litre variant of the engine, capable of producing over 800 hp (597 kW; 811 PS) in racing trim at 9,000 rpm and 1,400 hp (1,044 kW; 1,419 PS) in qualifying trim. The chassis consisted of an aluminium monocoque, reinforced at key points with carbon fibre honeycomb, and a steel tube sub frame, with the engine mounted in the middle in a longitudinal fashion. It had ventilated disc brakes all around, and used Goodyear Eagle tires.

== Racing history ==
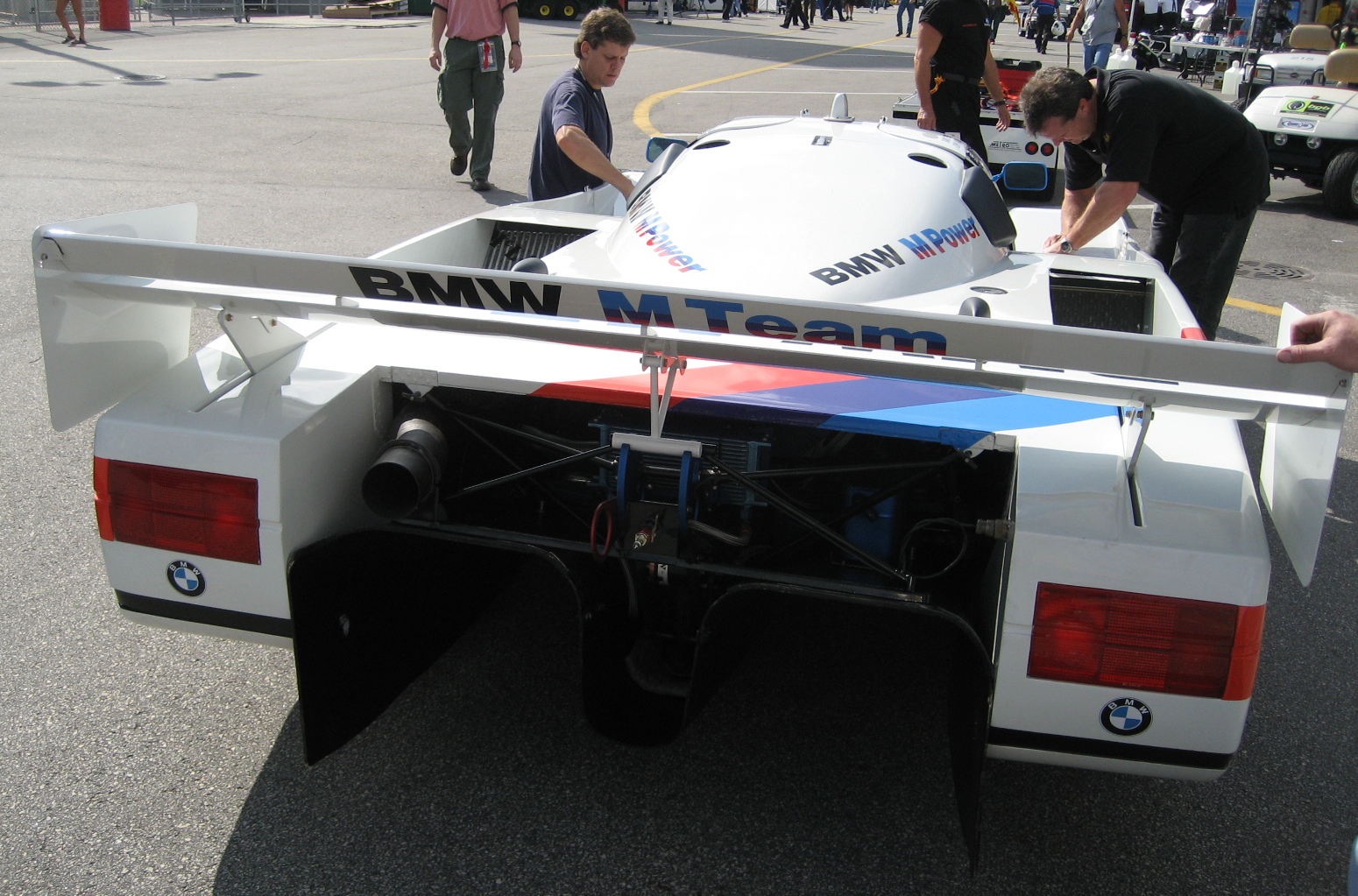
The BMW GTP from the rear.

BMW North America attempted to debut the car at the 1986 24 Hours of Daytona, which opened the IMSA GT season; however, a fire during a Road Atlanta test left the only completed car too badly damaged to race. Instead, the BMW GTP made its debut at the Grand Prix of Miami, with Davy Jones and John Andretti driving one car, whilst David Hobbs partnered John Watson in the other. Although the Jones/Andretti car crashed out after 41 laps, resulting in the pair being classified in 25th, Hobbs and Watson brought their car home in ninth, having completed 122 laps. At the 12 Hours of Sebring, BMW North America attempted to run three cars, but they withdrew after Bobby Rahal's car was involved in a big accident. Only one car was entered at the Grand Prix of Atlanta, which Watson drove; the car lasted just one lap before retiring, resulting in Watson being classified 23rd overall, and 15th in the GTP category. Following the stream of mechanical failures experienced by both the BMW GTP and the Brabham BT55 F1 cars, BMW withdrew from the Lime Rock Grand Prix. They returned for the Watkins Glen Grand Prix, with the same two-car entry that had competed at the Grand Prix of Miami; this time, both cars held together, with Jones and Andretti taking fifth, a lap ahead of Watson and Hobbs, who took sixth.

At the Portland Grand Prix, Andretti retired after 39 laps, and was classified in 20th overall, and 16th in the GTP category; however, Watson and Hobbs took fourth overall, and finished on the lead lap. Fortunes for the two pairs of drivers would reverse at the California Grand Prix; Watson and Hobbs retired after 59 laps, and were classified 18th overall, and 14th in the GTP category, whilst Andretti and Jones took fifth overall, again finishing on the same lap as the leader. However, the Road America 500 saw a dramatic disintegration of the team's recent form; Jones crashed out after just two laps, and was classified 60th and last overall (16th in class), whilst Watson and Hobbs experienced a fuel system failure after 71 laps, and were classified in 43rd overall, and 12th in class. At the New York 500, Watson and Hobbs retired after 67 laps, and were classified in 21st, and 11th in the GTP category; however, Jones and Andretti won the race by just over 24 seconds, and took the fastest lap in the process. The penultimate round of the season, which was the Columbus Grand Prix, saw both cars retire within the space of four laps; Jones and Andretti after 70 laps, which saw them classified 26th overall, and 15th in the GTP category, whilst Watson and Hobbs lasted the extra four laps, and were classified two places ahead overall and in class. Things improved at the Daytona Finale, which was the final round of the IMSA season; Jones and Andretti lasted for 83 laps before retiring, and were classified in 20th overall, and tenth in the GTP category, whilst Watson and Hobbs finished the race and were classified ninth overall, and seventh in class, after 91 laps. In the driver's championship, Andretti was the highest classified BMW GTP driver; he finished 22nd, with 37 points, whilst Jones took 25th, and Hobbs and Watson shared 28th. However, BMW withdrew from the IMSA GTP series at the end of the season. The car's career had not quite ended, however; BMW entered two cars at the opening round of the ADAC Würth Supercup season in 1987, which was held at the Nürburgring; however, they never actually competed in the race, and the BMW GTP was never used again.
