= Akira Hagiwara =

Japanese racing driver

Akira Hagiwara 萩原光
- Nationality: (Japan) Japanese
- Born: July 21, 1956 Odawara, Kanagawa, Japan
- Died: April 7, 1986 (aged 29) Murata, Miyagi, Japan

Japanese Formula 2
- Years active: 1982–1986
- Teams: Tomei Racing; Leyton House Racing Team
- Starts: 24
- Wins: 0
- Poles: 0
- Fastest laps: 0
- Best finish: 7th in 1984 & 1985

Akira Hagiwara (萩原 光, Hagiwara Akira; 21 July 1956 – 7 April 1986) was a Japanese racing driver.

== Career ==
Born in Odawara, Kanagawa Prefecture, Japan, Hagiwara was a graduate of the Tokai University in Tokyo. He started his racing career at the age of 21, driving a Nissan Sunny, and eventually progressed to the Japanese Formula 3 championship finishing fourth in 1980 and runner-up in 1981. After a season spent in the JAF Pacific Series, Hagiwara embarked on a full-time campaign in the Japanese Formula 2 championship alongside sporadic appearances in the All Japan Endurance Championship, racing alongside Kazuyoshi Hoshino. In 1985, Hagiwara, Hoshino, and Keiji Matsumoto became the first few Japanese drivers to ever win a race in the World Sportscar Championship; Hoshino was actually the only one who got to drive the car before the race was stopped early due to heavy rain.

== Death ==
Hagiwara was killed during a private testing session at Sportsland SUGO on Monday, 7 April 1986. Piloting a Mercedes-Benz 190E 2.3-16V operated by Leyton House Racing, Hagiwara crashed in Turn 2 (now called Rainbow Corner). The car then engulfed in flames, trapping the 29-year-old driver inside.

Originally, Hagiwara was not supposed to test on Monday as he had entered the opening race of the All Japan Endurance Championship held on Sunday, 6 April 1986 (the International Suzuka 500km held at Suzuka Circuit). However, the Nissan R86V, which was scheduled to race in Suzuka, suffered from a mechanical problem during free practice and was unable to participate in the race. Hagiwara thus changed his schedule and headed for Sportsland SUGO which led to the fateful testing session.

After his death, Aguri Suzuki was chosen to replace Hagiwara for the 1986 24 Hours of Le Mans in the No. 23 Nissan R86V entry.

== Racing record ==
=== Japanese Top Formula Championship results ===
(key) (Races in bold indicate pole position) (Races in italics indicate fastest lap)

Year	Entrant	1	2	3	4	5	6	7	8	DC	Points
1982	Tomei Racing	SUZ	FUJ	SUZ	SUZ	SUZ; 8	SUZ			20th	3
1983	Autobacs Tomei Racing	SUZ; 10	FUJ; 6	MIN	SUZ; 12	SUZ; Ret	FUJ; 8	SUZ; Ret	SUZ; 16	12th	10
1984	Tomei Racing	SUZ; 6	FUJ; 7	MIN; 4	SUZ; 8	SUZ; 4	FUJ; Ret	SUZ; 13	SUZ; Ret	7th	33
1985	Tomei Racing	SUZ; 5	FUJ; 4	MIN; 7	SUZ; 4	SUZ; DNS	FUJ; 12	SUZ; 7	SUZ; 7	7th	40
1986	Leyton House Racing Team	SUZ; Ret	FUJ	MIN	SUZ	SUZ	FUJ	SUZ	SUZ	NC	0
