= March 85G =

Racing automobile (1984-1988)

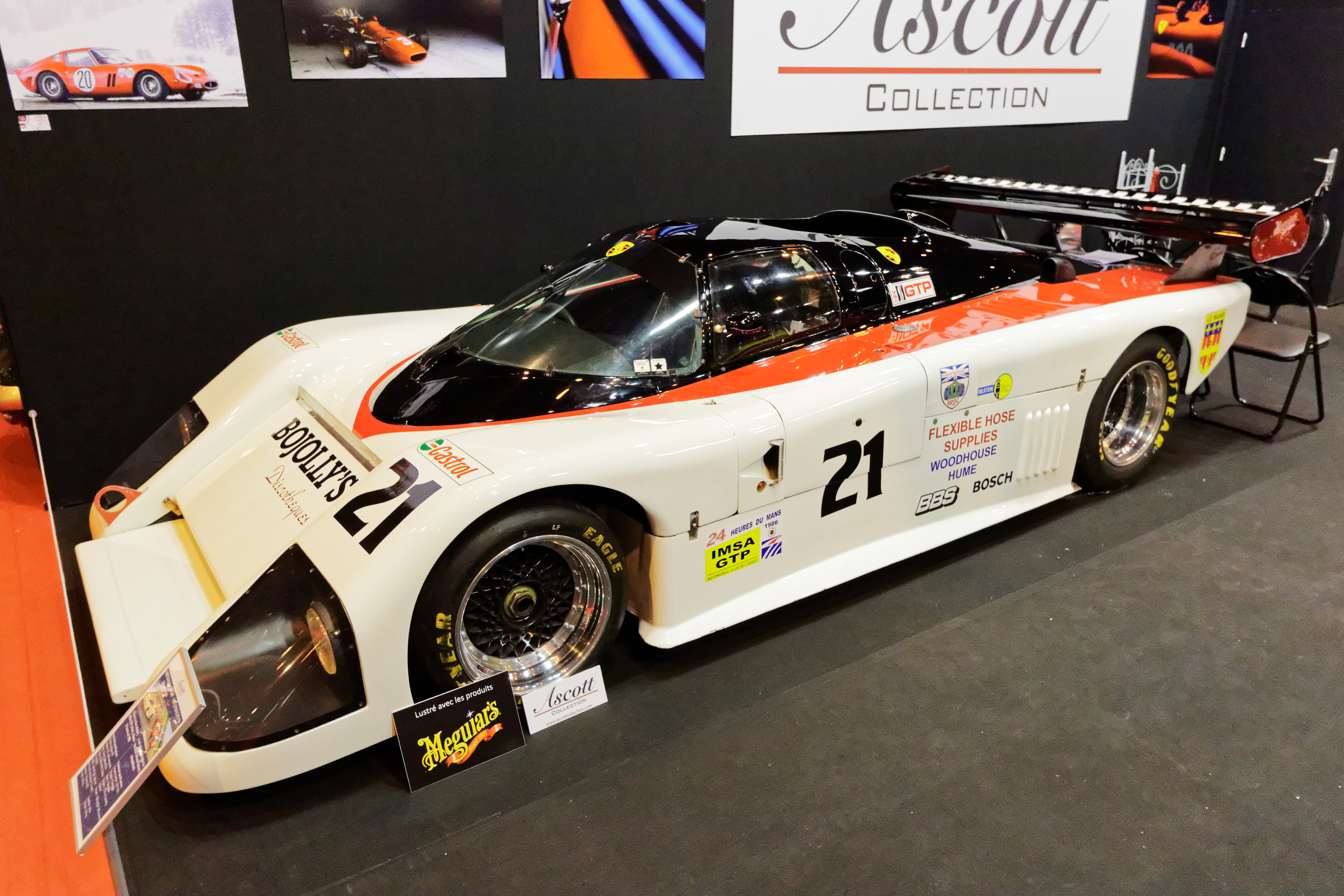
March 85G-Porsche

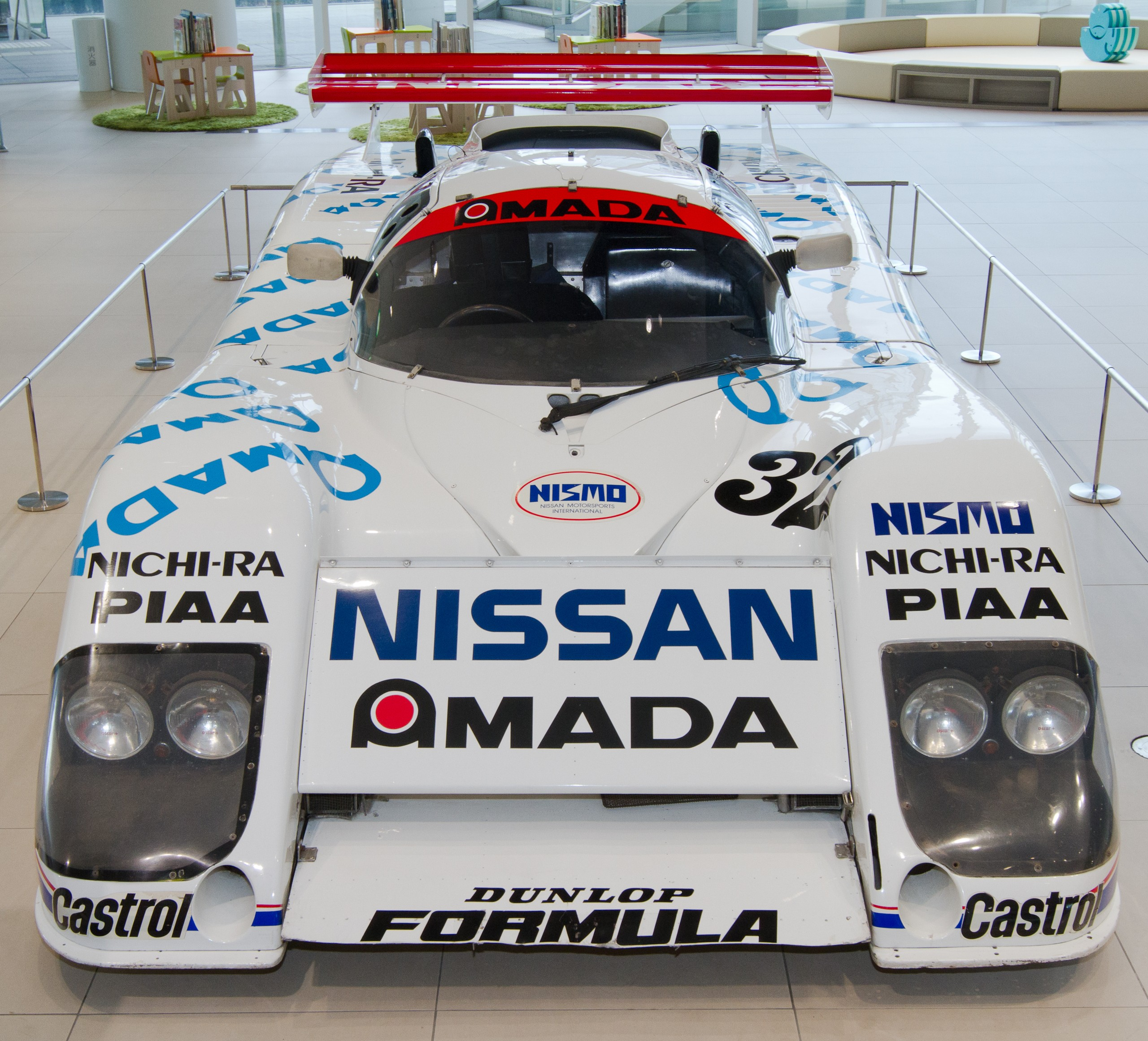
March 85G-Nissan

The March 85G was a mid-engined IMSA racing sports prototype, designed and developed by March Engineering in 1984 and used in sports car racing until 1988.

== Development history and technology ==
The 85G was the last evolutionary stage of the 82G chassis, which March produced in 1981. The aluminum chassis was made in monocoque construction. The large ventilation opening between the headlights led the air under the car; this was intended to generate more downforce, but this was only partially successful.

Eleven chassis were manufactured at March, three of which were sold to Nissan Motorsports International. Two vehicles were fitted with V6 engines, the third received an in-line 4-cylinder engine. Nissan used the car in 1985 and 1986 as the Nissan R85V in sports car racing.

The remaining vehicles were sold to IMSA teams and equipped with different racing engines. Conte and Ralf Sanchez Racing relied on a V6 Buick turbo engine; the Leon Brothers Racing 85G ran a 6-cylinder Porsche flat engine and the DeAtley Racing car ran a Chevrolet V8 engine.

== Racing history ==
85G were reported 94 times in 47 races; in five years of use, there was only one overall victory and a total of five places in the top three. The car made its racing debut at the 3 Hours of Daytona in 1984; Two vehicles were reported, both of which failed. Emerson Fittipaldi contested one of his rare sports car races in one of the vehicles.

The only race victory there was in 1985 at the World Sportscar Championship counting 1000 km race from Fuji. Due to heavy rain, almost all of the top teams had decided not to start. The race had to be stopped after just a quarter of the distance because the track was impassable. At the time of the abandonment, the Japanese trio Kazuyoshi Hoshino, Akira Hagiwara and Keiji Matsumoto were leading and thus won the championship run.
