= Autosport BRDC Award =

Racing award

The Silverstone Autosport BRDC Award is an award set up in 1989, following the demise of the Grovewood Awards, to reward and recognise young racing drivers from the UK. As its names suggest, the award is backed by Silverstone, motorsport magazine Autosport, and the British Racing Drivers' Club (BRDC). As well as the prestige of winning the award, a test drive in an Aston Martin Formula One car and £200,000 – increased from £50,000 in 2010 – cash prize, the award winner is also presented with the Chris Bristow Trophy.

McLaren ended its longstanding partnership with the accolade in January 2019, and was replaced by Aston Martin. The 2019 winner received a test in a Red Bull Racing car at Silverstone, as Aston Martin was the team's sponsor, and test in an FIA World Endurance Championship Aston Martin Vantage GTE car. The Award was not held in 2020, but since 2021, the winner has received a test in an Aston Martin F1 Team car and an overall £200,000 prize fund.

In August 2025, it was announced that the 2025 award would not take place, with organisers stating a review of the award would take place before a future relaunch.

== Procedure ==
Members of the public are invited to nominate drivers for the award and a shortlist of six finalists is decided upon by the award's judging panel. The finalists then spend two or three days at a British circuit in mid-November driving different types of car to evaluate their performance as well as interview sessions with the panel. The winner is announced at the annual Autosport Awards in early December.

== Past winners and nominees ==
- A total of 134 drivers have been nominated for the prize since it was first handed out.

| Year | Winner | Career highlights | Losing Finalists |
|---|---|---|---|
| 1989 | David Coulthard | British Formula Ford champion (1989); British F3 runner-up (1991); F3000 3rd place (1993); F1 (1994–2008), 13 wins DTM (2010–2012) | no shootout chosen by Autosport |
| 1990 | Gareth Rees | Marlboro Masters F3 winner (1994); British F2 winner (1996) | Philip Bate; Steve Brogan; David Cuff; Shaun Nicholson; James Rhodes |
| 1991 | Oliver Gavin | British F3 champion (1995); F1 test driver (Pacific, Benetton); Five-time class winner at the 24 Hours of Le Mans | Dario Franchitti; Jonathan McGall; Dino Morelli; Guy Smith; Jamie Spence |
| 1992 | Dario Franchitti | British Formula Vauxhall champion (1993); CART runner-up (1999); Indianapolis 500 Winner (2007, 2010, 2012); IndyCar Series champion (2007, 2009, 2010, 2011) | Paul Evans; Ralph Firman; Jonny Kane; Martin O'Connell; Brian Saunders |
| 1993 | Ralph Firman | British F3 champion (1996); Formula Nippon champion (2002); Jordan F1 driver (2003) | Darren Malkin; Darren Manning; James Matthews; Guy Smith; Jamie Spence |
| 1994 | Jamie Davies | F3000 4th place (1997); British GT champion (2002); GTS class winner at 2003 24 Hours of Le Mans; Le Mans Series champion (2004); 2nd place at 2004 24 Hours of Le Mans | Alex Deighton; Peter Dumbreck; Jonny Kane; James Matthews; Richard Westbrook |
| 1995 | Jonny Kane | British Formula Vauxhall champion (1996); British F3 champion (1997); LMP2 class-winner at 2010 24 Hours of Le Mans | Wayne Douglas; Marc Hynes; Kevin McGarrity; Guy Smith; Justin Wilson |
| 1996 | Darren Turner | Formula Renault UK runner-up (1996); DTM (2000–2001); BTCC (2006–2008); 24 Hours of Le Mans GT1 winner (2007, 2008); 24 Hours of Le Mans LMGTE Pro winner (2017) | David Cook; Peter Dumbreck; Darren Malkin; Tim Mullen; Dan Wheldon |
| 1997 | Andrew Kirkaldy | British Formula Vauxhall runner-up (1997); British GT champion (2005) | Matt Davies; Marc Hynes; Leighton Walker; Dan Wheldon; Adam Wilcox |
| 1998 | Jenson Button | British Formula Ford champion (1998); F1 (2000–2016), World Champion (2009); Super GT GT500 champion (2018) | Doug Bell; Matt Davies; Robbie Kerr; James Pickford; Justin Wilson |
| 1999 | Gary Paffett | British Formula Vauxhall champion (1999); German F3 champion (2002); DTM champion (2005, 2018) | Westley Barber; Ryan Dalziel; Richard Lyons; Craig Murray; Leighton Walker |
| 2000 | Anthony Davidson | British Formula Ford champion (2000); British F3 runner-up (2001); BAR/Honda F1 test driver (2001–2006); F1 with Super Aguri-Honda (2007–2008); 2nd overall at 2013 24 Hours of Le Mans; World Endurance Championship champion (2014) | Ryan Dalziel; Matt Gilmore; Derek Hayes; Robbie Kerr; Mark Taylor |
| 2001 | Steven Kane | Northern Irish Formula Ford champion (2000); British F3 Scholarship class runner-up (2003); Spanish F3 3rd place (2004) | Carl Breeze; Matt Gilmore; Robbie Kerr; Simon Pullan; Danny Watts |
| 2002 | Jamie Green | British F3 runner-up (2003); Formula 3 Euro Series champion (2004); DTM (8 wins, 3rd in 2012) | Westley Barber; Adam Carroll; Dan Eagling; Christian England; Danny Watts |
| 2003 | Alex Lloyd | Indy Pro Series champion (2007); 4th in 2010 Indianapolis 500; IndyCar Rookie of the Year (2010) | Ben Clucas; Tom Kimber-Smith; James Rossiter; Ryan Sharp; Susie Stoddart |
| 2004 | Paul di Resta | Formula 3 Euro Series champion (2006); DTM champion (2010); F1 Driver with Force India 2011-2013; 24 Hours of Le Mans LMP2 winner (2020) | Tim Bridgman; Mike Conway; Jonathan Kennard; Scott Mansell; Susie Stoddart |
| 2005 | Oliver Jarvis | Formula Renault UK champion (2005); Macau Grand Prix winner (2007); 12 Hours of Sebring overall winner (2013); 24 Hours of Daytona GT class winner (2013); 24 Hours of Le Mans LMP2 winner (2017); IMSA SportsCar Championship Daytona Prototype champion (2022) | Sam Bird; Joey Foster; James Jakes; Joe Tandy; Duncan Tappy |
| 2006 | Oliver Turvey | British Formula BMW runner-up (2006); British F3 runner-up (2008); McLaren Formula One test driver LMP2 class winner - Le Mans 24hr (2014) | Jon Barnes; Sam Bird; Nathan Freke; Jeremy Metcalfe; Oliver Oakes |
| 2007 | Stefan Wilson | Formula Palmer Audi runner-up (2007); 3rd in 2011 Indy Lights | Henry Arundel; Callum MacLeod; Dean Smith; Nick Tandy; Duncan Tappy |
| 2008 | Alexander Sims | Formula Renault UK runner-up (2008); Nürburgring 24 Hours overall winner (2023); IMSA SportsCar Championship GTP champion (2023) | Wayne Boyd; Adam Christodoulou; Jason Moore; Aaron Steele; Dean Stoneman |
| 2009 | Dean Smith | Formula BMW UK champion (2005); Formula Renault UK champion (2009) | James Calado; Adam Christodoulou; James Cole; Callum MacLeod; Chrissy Palmer |
| 2010 | Lewis Williamson | Formula Renault UK runner-up (2010); Blancpain Endurance Pro-Am Cup champion (2018) | Luciano Bacheta; Tom Blomqvist; Jack Harvey; Scott Malvern; Nigel Moore |
| 2011 | Oliver Rowland | Formula Renault UK runner-up (2011); Eurocup Formula Renault 2.0 runner-up (2013); Formula Renault 3.5 Series champion (2015) | Emil Bernstorff; Tom Blomqvist; Alex Lynn; Scott Malvern; Dino Zamparelli |
| 2012 | Jake Dennis | Intersteps champion (2011); Formula Renault 2.0 NEC champion (2012); Formula E champion (2022–23) | Jack Hawksworth; Josh Hill; Jordan King; Melville McKee; Josh Webster |
| 2013 | Matt Parry | Intersteps champion (2012); Formula Renault 2.0 NEC champion (2013) | Jack Aitken; Jake Hughes; Chris Middlehurst; Seb Morris; Charlie Robertson |
| 2014 | George Russell | BRDC Formula 4 champion (2014); GP3 Series champion (2017); Formula 2 champion (2018); Williams F1 driver (2019–2021); Mercedes F1 driver (2022–present) | Alexander Albon; Ben Barnicoat; Sennan Fielding; Seb Morris; Harrison Scott |
| 2015 | Will Palmer | BRDC Formula 4 champion (2015) | Jack Aitken; Ben Barnicoat; Ricky Collard; Jake Hughes; Toby Sowery |
| 2016 | Lando Norris | MSA Formula champion (2015); Toyota Racing Series champion (2016); Formula Renault 2.0 NEC champion (2016); Eurocup Formula Renault 2.0 champion (2016); FIA Formula 3 European champion (2017); McLaren F1 driver (2019–present); F1 World Champion (2025) | Ricky Collard; Sennan Fielding; Toby Sowery |
| 2017 | Dan Ticktum | Macau Grand Prix winner (2017, 2018) | Enaam Ahmed; Max Fewtrell; Harrison Scott |
| 2018 | Tom Gamble | Ginetta Junior Championship champion (2017); European Le Mans Series LMP3 champion (2020) | Jamie Caroline; Max Fewtrell; Kiern Jewiss |
| 2019 | Johnathan Hoggard | BRDC British Formula 3 Championship runner-up (2019) | Enaam Ahmed; Jamie Chadwick; Ayrton Simmons |
| 2020 | Not awarded due to the COVID-19 pandemic | | |
| 2021 | Zak O'Sullivan | GB3 Championship champion (2021) | Oliver Bearman; Jonny Edgar; Louis Foster |
| 2022 | Luke Browning | F4 British Championship champion (2020); GB3 Championship champion (2022); Macau Grand Prix winner (2023) | Oliver Bearman; Jamie Chadwick; Louis Foster |
| 2023 | Joseph Loake | BRSCC Fiesta Junior Championship champion (2020); 3rd in GB3 Championship (2023) | Taylor Barnard; Arvid Lindblad; Callum Voisin |
| 2024 | Deagen Fairclough | F4 British Championship champion (2024) | Arvid Lindblad; Louis Sharp; Freddie Slater |
| 2025 | Not awarded | | |
