= 1994 Masters of Formula 3 =

Race details
Date	7 August 1994
Official name	Marlboro Masters of Formula 3
Location	Circuit Park Zandvoort, Netherlands
Course	2.519 km (1.565 mi)
Distance	30 laps, 75.57 km (46.96 mi)

Pole
Driver	(Germany) Jörg Müller	Marko RSM
Time	1:01.306

Fastest Lap
Driver	(Germany) Sascha Maassen	Opel Team WTS
Time	1:01.509 (on lap 5 of 30)

Podium
First	(United Kingdom) Gareth Rees	Alan Docking Racing
Second	(Germany) Jörg Müller	Marko RSM
Third	(Germany) Sascha Maassen	Opel Team WTS

The 1994 Marlboro Masters of Formula 3 was the fourth Masters of Formula 3 race held at the Circuit Park Zandvoort in Zandvoort, Netherlands on 7 August 1994. It was won by Gareth Rees, for Alan Docking Racing. Rees' victory made him the second British driver to win the race since David Coulthard in 1991. Jörg Müller of Marko RSM finished in second and Sascha Maassen came in third for Opel Team WTS.

== Drivers and teams ==
1994 Entry List
Team	No	Driver	Chassis (Note: All drivers competed in Dallara chassis; model listed.)	Engine	Main series
(Germany) Opel Team WTS	1	(Germany) Sascha Maassen	F394	Opel	German Formula Three
(Germany) Opel Team WTS	2	(Germany) Ralf Schumacher	F394	Opel	German Formula Three
(Germany) Opel Team WTS	51	(Japan) Katsumi Yamamoto	F393	Opel	German Formula Three
(United Kingdom) Paul Stewart Racing	3	(Denmark) Jan Magnussen	F394	Mugen-Honda	British Formula 3
(United Kingdom) Paul Stewart Racing	4	(United Kingdom) Dario Franchitti	F394	Mugen-Honda	British Formula 3
(Italy) RC Motorsport	5	(Netherlands) Martijn Koene	F394	Opel	German Formula Three
(Italy) RC Motorsport	6	(Italy) Giancarlo Fisichella	F394	Opel	Italian Formula Three
(Austria) Marko RSM	7	(Germany) Jörg Müller	F394	Fiat	German Formula Three
(United Kingdom) West Surrey Racing	9	(Belgium) Vincent Radermecker	F394	Mugen-Honda	British Formula 3
(United Kingdom) West Surrey Racing	10	(Brazil) Gualter Salles	F394	Mugen-Honda	British Formula 3
(France) Elf La Filière	11	(France) Christophe Tinseau	F393	Opel	French Formula Three
(Italy) Coloni Motorsport	14	(Italy) Paolo Coloni	F394	Fiat	Italian Formula Three
(Italy) Coloni Motorsport	15	(Italy) Gianluca Paglicci	F394	Fiat	
(Germany) G+M Escom Motorsport	17	(Austria) Alexander Wurz	F394	Opel	German Formula Three
(Germany) G+M Escom Motorsport	20	(Germany) Michael Graf	F394	Opel	German Formula Three
(United Kingdom) Alan Docking Racing	22	(United Kingdom) Gareth Rees	F394	Mugen-Honda	British Formula 3
(United Kingdom) Alan Docking Racing	23	(United States) Brian Cunningham	F394	Mugen-Honda	British Formula 3
(Italy) Tatuus	24	(Italy) Gianantonio Pacchioni	F394	Fiat	Italian Formula Three
(Italy) Tatuus	25	(Italy) Roberto Colciago	F394	Fiat	Italian Formula Three
(Germany) Elf Team Formel 3	27	(Austria) Philipp Peter	F394	Fiat	German Formula Three
(United Kingdom) Edenbridge Racing	29	(Brazil) Marcos Gueiros	F394	Vauxhall	British Formula 3
(United Kingdom) Edenbridge Racing	30	(Brazil) Luiz Garcia Jr.	F394	Vauxhall	British Formula 3
(Italy) Italracing F3	32	(Italy) Luca Riccitelli	F393	Fiat	Italian Formula Three
(Italy) Supercars CM	34	(Italy) Luca Rangoni	F394	Fiat	Italian Formula Three
(Italy) Supercars CM	35	(Italy) Alberto Scilla	F394	Fiat	Italian Formula Three
(Switzerland) KMS	38	(Argentina) Norberto Fontana	F394	Opel	German Formula Three
(United Kingdom) Fortec Motorsport	39	(France) Jérémie Dufour	F394	Mugen-Honda	British Formula 3
(United Kingdom) Fortec Motorsport	40	(Brazil) Roberto Xavier	F394	Mugen-Honda	British Formula 3
(United Kingdom) Team AJS	41	(Brazil) Ricardo Rosset	F394	Mugen-Honda	British Formula 3
(Italy) PTM Motorsport	42	(Italy) Danilo Rossi	F394	Fiat	Italian Formula Three
(Germany) Abt Motorsport	43	(Germany) Christian Abt	F394	Opel	German Formula Three
(Germany) Volkswagen Motorsport	44	(Italy) Massimiliano Angelelli	F394	Volkswagen	German Formula Three
(Italy) BVM Racing	45	(Italy) Thomas Biagi	F394	Mugen-Honda	Italian Formula Three
(Netherlands) Westwood Racing	50	(Netherlands) Alex Veenman	F393	Opel	
(Germany) Hofmann Motorsport	52	(Germany) Thomas Winkelhock	F393	Opel	German Formula Three

== Classification ==
=== Qualifying ===
Pos	No	Name	Team	Time	Gap
1	7	(Germany) Jörg Müller	Marko RSM	1:01.306	
2	22	(United Kingdom) Gareth Rees	Alan Docking Racing	1:01.374	+0.068
3	1	(Germany) Sascha Maassen	Opel Team WTS	1:01.410	+0.104
4	27	(Austria) Philipp Peter	Elf Team Formel 3	1:01.524	+0.218
5	17	(Austria) Alexander Wurz	G+M Escom Motorsport	1:01.539	+0.233
6	3	(Denmark) Jan Magnussen	Paul Stewart Racing	1:01.561	+0.255
7	41	(Brazil) Ricardo Rosset	Team AJS	1:01.629	+0.323
8	39	(France) Jérémie Dufour	Fortec Motorsport	1:01.632	+0.326
9	38	(Argentina) Norberto Fontana	KMS	1:01.634	+0.328
10	25	(Italy) Roberto Colciago	Tatuus	1:01.653	+0.347
11	11	(France) Christophe Tinseau	Elf La Filière	1:01.669	+0.363
12	2	(Germany) Ralf Schumacher	Opel Team WTS	1:01.682	+0.376
13	29	(Brazil) Marcos Gueiros	Edenbridge Racing	1:01.730	+0.424
14	24	(Italy) Gianantonio Pacchioni	Tatuus	1:01.765	+0.459
15	6	(Italy) Giancarlo Fisichella	RC Motorsport	1:01.767	+0.461
16	9	(Belgium) Vincent Radermecker	West Surrey Racing	1:01.805	+0.499
17	14	(Italy) Paolo Coloni	Coloni Motorsport	1:01.808	+0.502
18	44	(Italy) Massimiliano Angelelli	Volkswagen Motorsport	1:01.831	+0.525
19	15	(Italy) Gianluca Paglicci	Coloni Motorsport	1:01.917	+0.611
20	43	(Germany) Christian Abt	Abt Motorsport	1:01.947	+0.641
21	4	(United Kingdom) Dario Franchitti	Paul Stewart Racing	1:02.005	+0.699
22	30	(Brazil) Luiz Garcia Jr.	Edenbridge Racing	1:02.042	+0.736
23	32	(Italy) Luca Riccitelli	Italracing F3	1:02.206	+0.900
24	34	(Italy) Luca Rangoni	Supercars CM	1:02.340	+1.034
25	51	(Japan) Katsumi Yamamoto	Opel Team WTS	1:02.414	+1.108
26	35	(Italy) Alberto Scilla	Supercars CM	1:02.427	+1.121
27	10	(Brazil) Gualter Salles	West Surrey Racing	1:02.474	+1.168
28	5	(Netherlands) Martijn Koene	RC Motorsport	1:02.487	+1.181
29	23	(United States) Brian Cunningham	Alan Docking Racing	1:02.626	+1.320
30	45	(Italy) Thomas Biagi	BVM Racing	1:02.645	+1.339
31	42	(Italy) Danilo Rossi	PTM Motorsport	1:02.803	+1.497
32	20	(Germany) Michael Graf	G+M Escom Motorsport	1:03.027	+1.721
33	52	(Germany) Thomas Winkelhock	Hofmann Motorsport	1:03.184	+1.878
34	40	(Brazil) Roberto Xavier	Fortec Motorsport	1:03.188	+1.882
35	50	(Netherlands) Alex Veenman	Westwood Racing	1:03.461	+2.155

=== Race ===
Pos	No	Driver	Team	Laps	Time/Retired	Grid
1	22	(United Kingdom) Gareth Rees	Alan Docking Racing	30	36:29.363	2
2	7	(Germany) Jörg Müller	Marko RSM	30	+0.752	1
3	1	(Germany) Sascha Maassen	Opel Team WTS	30	+1.110	3
4	27	(Austria) Philipp Peter	Elf Team Formel 3	30	+2.892	4
5	38	(Argentina) Norberto Fontana	KMS	30	+5.787	9
6	14	(Italy) Paolo Coloni	Coloni Motorsport	30	+9.619	17
7	25	(Italy) Roberto Colciago	Tatuus	30	+11.813	10
8	39	(France) Jérémie Dufour	Fortec Motorsport	30	+12.071	8
9	6	(Italy) Giancarlo Fisichella	RC Motorsport	30	+ 12.790	15
10	29	(Brazil) Marcos Gueiros	Edenbridge Racing	30	+14.449	13
11	11	(France) Christophe Tinseau	Elf La Filière	30	+14.960	11
12	4	(United Kingdom) Dario Franchitti	Paul Stewart Racing	30	+15.638	21
13	43	(Germany) Christian Abt	Abt Motorsport	30	+16.142	20
14	30	(Brazil) Luiz Garcia Jr.	Edenbridge Racing	30	+17.243	22
15	5	(Netherlands) Martijn Koene	RC Motorsport	30	+17.638	28
16	9	(Belgium) Vincent Radermecker	West Surrey Racing	30	+17.907	16
17	32	(Italy) Luca Riccitelli	Italracing F3	30	+25.377	23
18	20	(Germany) Michael Graf	G+M Escom Motorsport	30	+27.285	32
19	34	(Italy) Luca Rangoni	Supercars CM	30	+28.442	24
20	15	(Italy) Gianluca Paglicci	Coloni Motorsport	28	+2 Laps	19
21	44	(Italy) Massimiliano Angelelli	Volkswagen Motorsport	27	+3 Laps	18
22	45	(Italy) Thomas Biagi	BVM Racing	24	Retired	30
23	51	(Japan) Katsumi Yamamoto	Opel Team WTS	21	Retired	25
24	10	(Brazil) Gualter Salles	West Surrey Racing	21	Retired	27
25	24	(Italy) Gianantonio Pacchioni	Tatuus	20	Retired	14
Ret	17	(Austria) Alexander Wurz	G+M Escom Motorsport	19	Retired	5
Ret	3	(Denmark) Jan Magnussen	Paul Stewart Racing	8	Retired	6
Ret	23	(United States) Brian Cunningham	Alan Docking Racing	6	Retired	29
Ret	42	(Italy) Danilo Rossi	PTM Motorsport	6	Retired	31
Ret	2	(Germany) Ralf Schumacher	Opel Team WTS	5	Retired	12
DNS	41	(Brazil) Ricardo Rosset	Team AJS			7
DNS	35	(Italy) Alberto Scilla	Supercars CM			26
DNQ	52	(Germany) Thomas Winkelhock	Hofmann Motorsport			
DNQ	40	(Brazil) Roberto Xavier	Fortec Motorsport			
DNQ	50	(Netherlands) Alex Veenman	Westwood Racing			
Fastest lap: Sascha Maassen, 1:01.509, 147.432 km/h (91.610 mph) on lap 5
