= 1994 British Formula Three Championship =

Auto racing championship in the United Kingdom

1994 British Formula 3 International Series

Seasons
- ← 1993 1995 →

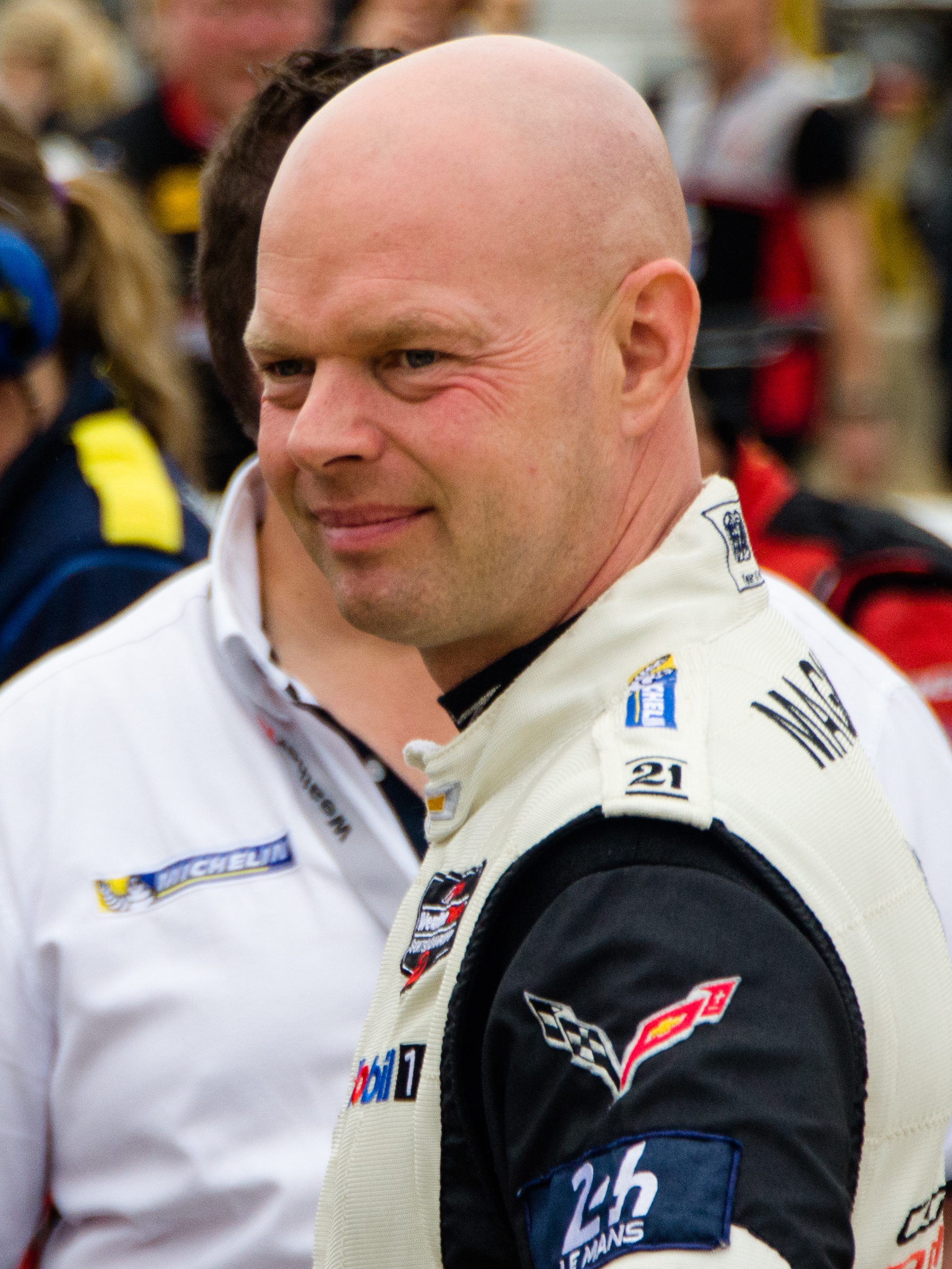
1994 champion, Jan Magnussen

The 1994 British Formula Three season was the 44th British Formula Three Championship, won by Jan Magnussen. The season started on 27 March at Silverstone and ended there on 2 October following eighteen races. 1994 saw the introduction of a new points-scoring system, with points now awarded down to tenth position, instead of only to sixth as previously, and all rounds counting towards the championship. Magnussen broke the series' previous win record held by 1983 champion Ayrton Senna by winning fourteen of the season's eighteen races. Class B was won by Duncan Vercoe.

In this 1994 British Formula 3 Season, for the first time there were four double events, in which two races were held at the same date and venue, each of them counting separately for the Championship, and awarding full points. In this type of event, the grid for the second race was established according to the finishing order of the first race.

The scoring system was 20-15-12-10-8-6-4-3-2-1 points awarded to the first ten finishers, with 1 (one) extra point added to the driver who set the fastest lap of the race. All results counted towards the driver's final tally.

== Drivers and Teams ==
Team	No	Driver	Chassis	Engine	Rounds
Class A
(United Kingdom) Paul Stewart Racing	1	(United Kingdom) Dario Franchitti	Dallara F394	Mugen-Honda	All
(United Kingdom) Paul Stewart Racing	2	(Denmark) Jan Magnussen	Dallara F394	Mugen-Honda	All
(United Kingdom) West Surrey Racing	3	(Belgium) Vincent Radermecker	Dallara F394	Mugen-Honda	All
(United Kingdom) West Surrey Racing	4	(Brazil) Gualter Salles	Dallara F394	Mugen-Honda	All
(United Kingdom) Edenbridge Racing	5	(Brazil) Marcos Gueiros	Dallara F394	Vauxhall	All
(United Kingdom) Edenbridge Racing	6	(Brazil) Luiz Garcia Jr.	Dallara F394	Vauxhall	All
(United Kingdom) Alan Docking Racing	7	(United Kingdom) Gareth Rees	Dallara F394	Mugen-Honda	All
(United Kingdom) Alan Docking Racing	8	(United States) Brian Cunningham	Dallara F394	Mugen-Honda	All
(United Kingdom) Alan Docking Racing	15	(South Africa) Stephen Watson	Dallara F394	Mugen-Honda	All
(United Kingdom) Alan Docking Racing	19	(Spain) Marc Gené	Dallara F394	Mitsubishi	2–18
(United Kingdom) Fortec Motorsport	9	(United Kingdom) Christian Horner	Dallara F394	Mugen-Honda	All
(United Kingdom) Fortec Motorsport	10	(France) Jérémie Dufour	Dallara F394	Mugen-Honda	1–2
(United Kingdom) Fortec Motorsport	42	(France) Jérémie Dufour	Dallara F394	Mugen-Honda	3–18
(United Kingdom) P1 Engineering	11	(Brazil) Roberto Xavier	Dallara F394	Fiat	1–14
(United Kingdom) P1 Engineering	12	(United Kingdom) Dino Morelli	Dallara F394	Fiat	1–7, 9–18
(United Kingdom) P1 Engineering	12	(United Kingdom) Warren Hughes	Dallara F394	Fiat	8
(United Kingdom) Richard Arnold Developments	14	(United Kingdom) Steven Arnold	Dallara F394	Mugen-Honda	All
(United Kingdom) DAW Racing	16	(South Africa) Garth Waberski	Dallara F394	Vauxhall	1–6, 8, 10–18
Racing for Spain	17	(Spain) Pedro de la Rosa	Dallara F394	Renault	All
Racing for Spain	18	(Spain) Ivan Arias	Dallara F394	Renault	All
(United Kingdom) Team AJS	20	(Brazil) Ricardo Rosset	Dallara F394	Mugen-Honda	All
(United Kingdom) March Cars	21	(United Kingdom) Warren Hughes	Ralt 94C	Toyota	1, 3–4
(United Kingdom) March Cars	22	(United Kingdom) Jeremy Cotterill	Ralt 94C	Toyota	1
(United Kingdom) PTM Motorsport	24	(United Kingdom) Jamie Spence	Dallara F394	Mugen-Honda	9–16
(United Kingdom) Fred Goddard Racing	25	(United Kingdom) Jamie Spence	Dallara F394	Mugen-Honda	2–6
(United Kingdom) Intersport	27	(United Kingdom) Scott Lakin	Dallara F394	Mugen-Honda	1–10
(United Kingdom) Intersport	27	(Italy) Fabiano Belletti	Dallara F394	Mugen-Honda	11–12, 17–18
(Italy) RC Motorsport	28	(Italy) Giancarlo Fisichella	Dallara F394	Opel	11
(Italy) RC Motorsport	29	(Italy) Jarno Trulli	Dallara F394	Opel	11
Class B
(United Kingdom) GH Racing	31	(United Kingdom) Gray Hedley	Dallara F393	Fiat	All
(United Kingdom) PTM Motorsport	32	(United Kingdom) Jamie Spence	Dallara F393	Fiat	7
(United Kingdom) PTM Motorsport	32	(United Kingdom) Chris Clark	Dallara F393	Fiat	1–6, 8–10
(United Kingdom) PTM Motorsport	32	(Brazil) Thomas Erdos	Dallara F393	Fiat	18
(United Kingdom) Bowman Racing	33	(United Kingdom) Piers Hunnisett	Bowman BC4	Mugen-Honda	7
(United Kingdom) Bowman Racing	34	(Italy) Davide Campana	Bowman BC3	Mugen-Honda	7
(United Kingdom) DAW Racing	36	(United Kingdom) Duncan Vercoe	Dallara F393	Vauxhall	1–6, 15–16
(United Kingdom) DAW Racing	36	(Brazil) Thomas Erdos	Dallara F393	Vauxhall	17
(United Kingdom) DAW Racing	36	(United Kingdom) Bobby Verdon-Roe	Dallara F393	Vauxhall	18
(United Kingdom) Alan Docking Racing	37	(United Kingdom) Paul Dawson	Dallara F393	Mugen-Honda	1–14, 17–18
(United Kingdom) Walker International	38	(United Kingdom) Steve Allen	Reynard 933	Mugen-Honda	1–11
(United Kingdom) Mark Bailey Racing	38	(United Kingdom) Steve Allen	Reynard 933	Mugen-Honda	17–18
(United Kingdom) Mark Bailey Racing	38	(United Kingdom) Johnny Mowlem	Reynard 933	Mugen-Honda	15–16
(United Kingdom) Mark Bailey Racing	48	(United Kingdom) Johnny Mowlem	Dallara F393	Mugen-Honda	8
(United Kingdom) Mark Bailey Racing	48	(United States) Zak Brown	Dallara F393	Mugen-Honda	10–11, 15–16
(United Kingdom) Mark Bailey Racing	48	(United Kingdom) Tim Pearson	Dallara F393	Mugen-Honda	17
(United Kingdom) Mark Bailey Racing	48	(Canada) Jean Clermont	Dallara F393	Mugen-Honda	18
(United Kingdom) J Williams Racing	39	(United Kingdom) Jonathan Williams	Ralt RT37	Mugen-Honda	9
(United Kingdom) Fred Goddard Racing	41	(Greece) Costas Lazarakis	Reynard 913	Mugen-Honda	1
(United Kingdom) Fred Goddard Racing	41	(United Kingdom) Alex Postan	Reynard 913	Mugen-Honda	15–16
(United Kingdom) Fred Goddard Racing	42	(South Africa) Marco dos Santos	Reynard 913	Mugen-Honda	2
(United Kingdom) ME Motorsport	44	(United Kingdom) Nigel Greensall	Reynard 923	Mugen-Honda	13–14

== Race calendar and results ==
Round	Circuit	Date	Pole position	Fastest lap	Winning driver	Winning team	Class B winner
1	Silverstone	27 March	(United Kingdom) Dario Franchitti	(Belgium) Vincent Radermecker	(United Kingdom) Dario Franchitti	(United Kingdom) Paul Stewart Racing	(United Kingdom) Duncan Vercoe
2	Donington Park	10 April	(Denmark) Jan Magnussen	(Brazil) Luiz Garcia Jr.	(Denmark) Jan Magnussen	(United Kingdom) Paul Stewart Racing	(United Kingdom) Duncan Vercoe
3	Brands Hatch	24 April	(Denmark) Jan Magnussen	(Denmark) Jan Magnussen	(Denmark) Jan Magnussen	(United Kingdom) Paul Stewart Racing	(United Kingdom) Duncan Vercoe
4	Brands Hatch	24 April	(Denmark) Jan Magnussen	(France) Jérémie Dufour	(Belgium) Vincent Radermecker	(United Kingdom) West Surrey Racing	(United Kingdom) Duncan Vercoe
5	Silverstone	2 May	(Denmark) Jan Magnussen	(United Kingdom) Scott Lakin	(Denmark) Jan Magnussen	(United Kingdom) Paul Stewart Racing	(United Kingdom) Duncan Vercoe
6	Silverstone	2 May	(Denmark) Jan Magnussen	(United Kingdom) Dario Franchitti	(Denmark) Jan Magnussen	(United Kingdom) Paul Stewart Racing	(United Kingdom) Duncan Vercoe
7	Brands Hatch	8 May	(United Kingdom) Scott Lakin	(France) Jérémie Dufour	(Denmark) Jan Magnussen	(United Kingdom) Paul Stewart Racing	(United Kingdom) Piers Hunnisett
8	Thruxton	30 May	(United Kingdom) Warren Hughes	(United Kingdom) Dario Franchitti	(Denmark) Jan Magnussen	(United Kingdom) Paul Stewart Racing	(United Kingdom) Duncan Vercoe
9	Oulton Park	4 June	(Denmark) Jan Magnussen	(Denmark) Jan Magnussen	(Denmark) Jan Magnussen	(United Kingdom) Paul Stewart Racing	(United Kingdom) Chris Clark
10	Donington Park	25 June	(Denmark) Jan Magnussen	(Brazil) Ricardo Rosset	(Denmark) Jan Magnussen	(United Kingdom) Paul Stewart Racing	(United Kingdom) Duncan Vercoe
11	Silverstone	9 July	(Belgium) Vincent Radermecker	(France) Jérémie Dufour	(Belgium) Vincent Radermecker	(United Kingdom) West Surrey Racing	(United Kingdom) Duncan Vercoe
12	Snetterton	24 July	(Brazil) Ricardo Rosset	(Brazil) Ricardo Rosset	(Brazil) Ricardo Rosset	(United Kingdom) Team AJS	(United Kingdom) Gray Hedley
13	Pembrey	21 August	(Belgium) Vincent Radermecker	(United Kingdom) Dario Franchitti	(Denmark) Jan Magnussen	(United Kingdom) Paul Stewart Racing	(United Kingdom) Duncan Vercoe
14	Pembrey	21 August	(Denmark) Jan Magnussen	(Belgium) Vincent Radermecker	(Denmark) Jan Magnussen	(United Kingdom) Paul Stewart Racing	(United Kingdom) Duncan Vercoe
15	Silverstone	29 August	(Denmark) Jan Magnussen	(United Kingdom) Gareth Rees	(Denmark) Jan Magnussen	(United Kingdom) Paul Stewart Racing	(United Kingdom) Duncan Vercoe
16	Silverstone	29 August	(Denmark) Jan Magnussen	(France) Jérémie Dufour	(Denmark) Jan Magnussen	(United Kingdom) Paul Stewart Racing	(United Kingdom) Duncan Vercoe
17	Thruxton	September 11	(Belgium) Vincent Radermecker	(France) Jérémie Dufour	(Denmark) Jan Magnussen	(United Kingdom) Paul Stewart Racing	(Brazil) Thomas Erdos
18	Silverstone	2 October	(Belgium) Vincent Radermecker	(France) Jérémie Dufour	(Denmark) Jan Magnussen	(United Kingdom) Paul Stewart Racing	(Brazil) Thomas Erdos

== Championship Standings ==
Pos.	Driver	SIL	DON	BRH	BRH	SIL	SIL	BRH	THR	OUL	DON	SIL	SNE	PEM	PEM	SIL	SIL	THR	SIL	Pts
Class A
1	(Denmark) Jan Magnussen	3	1	1	4	1	1	1	1	1	1	7	Ret	1	1	1	1	1	1	308
2	(Belgium) Vincent Radermecker	6	Ret	2	1	2	3	3	DNS	4	6	1	3	2	5	6	6	2	Ret	183
3	(United Kingdom) Gareth Rees	4	5	3	2	7	9	6	3	2	2	3	Ret	5	4	5	3	6	2	171
4	(United Kingdom) Dario Franchitti	1	3	Ret	Ret	Ret	10	2	2	13	3	6	10	3	2	14	8	5	4	133
5	(Brazil) Ricardo Rosset	9	10	6	10	6	4	Ret	6	5	5	Ret	1	4	3	3	2	3	Ret	132
6	(Brazil) Marcos Gueiros	8	Ret	5	5	3	5	4	7	Ret	4	5	4	11	Ret	2	5	9	Ret	107
7	(France) Jérémie Dufour	7	DNS	4	3	13	11	20	5	3	2	2	5	Ret	DNS	4	7	4	Ret	103
8	(United Kingdom) Scott Lakin	2	4	Ret	14	4	2	5	4	Ret	DNS									69
9	(United Kingdom) Dino Morelli	21	7	DNS	DNS	5	6	8		8	11	19	Ret	7	6	8	4	7	3	63
10	(Brazil) Gualter Salles	10	12	9	17	11	DNS	7	8	17	14	Ret	3	8	7	7	15	Ret	6	39
11	(Brazil) Luiz Garcia Jr.	12	2	10	Ret	9	12	12	DNS	10	8	8	9	12	12	9	10	8	Ret	34
12	(United States) Brian Cunningham	11	8	11	7	8	7	9	Ret	9	9	Ret	Ret	13	11	12	Ret	Ret	5	29
13	(United Kingdom) Jamie Spence		DNS	7	6	10	8			6	10	Ret	7	18	14	11	Ret			25
14	(United Kingdom) Steven Arnold	5	6	13	Ret	25	Ret	10	10	12	15	9	6	14	Ret	Ret	DNS	15	Ret	24
15	(Spain) Marc Gené		13	18	12	20	Ret	Ret	12	7	16	Ret	8	10	10	10	9	10	7	19
16	(Italy) Giancarlo Fisichella											4								10
17	(United Kingdom) Christian Horner	Ret	14	14	Ret	16	14	11	17	14	13	10	Ret	6	9	18	11	11	11	10
18	(South Africa) Stephen Watson	13	9	20	11	18	17	13	9	15	12	12	12	15	Ret	15	12	Ret	9	7
19	(Spain) Pedro de la Rosa	16	11	16	9	14	Ret	Ret	15	16	Ret	11	11	16	13	Ret	DNS	16	8	6
20	(United Kingdom) Warren Hughes	Ret		8	Ret				DNS											3
21	(Italy) Fabiano Belletti											17	13					17	10	3
22	(Brazil) Roberto Xavier	Ret	Ret	Ret	15	17	16	15	13	11	Ret	14	Ret	Ret	Ret					0
23	(Spain) Ivan Arias	Ret	15	Ret	13	12	15	14	16	Ret	17	Ret	Ret	DNS	DNS	17	14	12	DNS	0
24	(South Africa) Garth Waberski	14	Ret	12	DNS	19	18		14		Ret	Ret	Ret	Ret	Ret	16	Ret	14	13	0
25	(Italy) Jarno Trulli											15								0
	(United Kingdom) Jeremy Cotterill	Ret																		0
Class B
1	(United Kingdom) Duncan Vercoe	15	16	15	8	15	13		11	19	18	13	DNS	9	8	13	13			289
2	(United Kingdom) Gray Hedley	17	17	19	18	23	21	18	19	20	19	20	14	Ret	17	21	18	18	DNS	202
3	(United Kingdom) Paul Dawson	19	18	21	20	22	20	DNS	Ret	21	20	21	15	19	18			20	Ret	145
4	(United Kingdom) Steve Allen	18	Ret	22	19	24	22	19	20	22	DSQ	18						19	14	113
5	(United Kingdom) Chris Clark	Ret	Ret	17	16	21	19		Ret	18	DNS									80
6	(United Kingdom) Johnny Mowlem								18							19	16			45
7	(Brazil) Thomas Erdos																	13	12	41
8	(United States) Zak Brown										DNS	16				20	17			39
9	(United Kingdom) Nigel Greensall													20	16					27
10	(United Kingdom) Piers Hunnisett							16												21
11	(United Kingdom) Alex Postan															22	19			16
12	(Italy) Davide Campana							17												15
13	(Canada) Jean Clermont																		15	12
14	(Greece) Costas Lazarakis	20																		8
15	(United Kingdom) Tim Pearson																	21		8
16	(United Kingdom) Jonathan Williams									23										6
17	(United Kingdom) Bobby Verdon-Roe																		Ret	1
	(South Africa) Marco dos Santos		Ret																	0
	(United Kingdom) Jamie Spence							Ret												0
Pos.	Driver	SIL	DON	BRH	BRH	SIL	SIL	BRH	THR	OUL	DON	SIL	SNE	PEM	PEM	SIL	SIL	THR	SIL	Pts
