= 1996 British Formula Two Championship =

PURE HOLDING COMPANY

The 1996 British Formula Two Championship was the seventh season of the British Formula 3000 Championship. The championship was dominated by the Super Nova car of Gareth Rees, the former Marlboro Masters F3 winner who competed in International Formula 3000 the previous year. He won six races and clinched the title with two rounds to go.

Rees started the season in style, winning the first 5 races, but stumbled at Donington when Sascha Maassen took his only victory of the year. Werner Lupberger won the following round as Rees retired, but Gareth won the Silverstone round to tie up the championship. Luiz Garcia Jr. won the remaining two rounds after battling with Lupberger and Gonzalo Rodriguez, securing second in the standings. Lupberger ended up third, one place ahead of Rodriguez. British Formula Renault champion David Cook raced twice in Rees' absence, while future International F3000 star Jason Watt made his F3000 debut for Fred Goddard Racing in the final round. Ex-Andrea Moda F1 non-qualifier Perry McCarthy made a single seater return with DKS Racing. The future boss of International F3000 team Arden, Christian Horner, finished fifth overall after half a season with veteran team Madgwick International. Sarah Kavanagh, future Formula Nippon and BOSS Formula 1 driver, raced on a couple of occasions in a Sainsbury's and Parmalat backed Fred Goddard Racing entry.

Several talented drivers entered British F2 in 1996, but at times grids had declined to just five cars, the smallest in the series' history, and teams withdrew their support. British F2 was finally dead.

== Drivers and teams ==
The following drivers and teams contested the 1996 British Formula Two Championship. All teams ran a Reynard chassis with Cosworth engine.

Team	No.	Driver	Rounds
(United Kingdom) Fred Goddard Racing	1	(South Africa) Werner Lupberger	All
(United Kingdom) Fred Goddard Racing	6	(United Kingdom) Steve Arnold	1
(United Kingdom) Fred Goddard Racing	6	(Germany) Sascha Maassen	4, 6, 8-9
(United Kingdom) Fred Goddard Racing	6	(Denmark) Jason Watt	10
(United Kingdom) Fred Goddard Racing	16	(Republic of Ireland) Sarah Kavanagh	4, 6
(United Kingdom) Fred Goddard Racing	16	(United Kingdom) Francis Phillips	8
(United Kingdom) Fred Goddard Racing	16	(United Kingdom) Paul Smith	10
(United Kingdom) Fred Goddard Racing	22	(Russia) Alan Berkov	1, 4
(United Kingdom) Fred Goddard Racing	24	(United Kingdom) William Hewland	4
(United Kingdom) Super Nova Racing	2	(United Kingdom) Gareth Rees	1-8
(United Kingdom) Super Nova Racing	2	(United Kingdom) David Cook	9-10
(United Kingdom) Super Nova Racing	3	(Brazil) Luiz Garcia Jr.	All
(Italy) Durango Equipe	4	(Italy) Luca Riccitelli	1-4
(Italy) Durango Equipe	4	(Italy) Denny Zardo	5
(Italy) Durango Equipe	5	(Italy) Fabrizio Gollin	1
(Italy) Durango Equipe	5	(Italy) Vito Popolizio	2-3
(Italy) Durango Equipe	5	(Italy) Pietro Ferrero	4
(United Kingdom) Jupiter Racing	7	(United Kingdom) Nigel Smith	4
(United Kingdom) Madgwick International	8	(United Kingdom) Christian Horner	5-10
(United Kingdom) Edenbridge Racing	9	(Uruguay) Gonzalo Rodriguez	4–6, 8-10
(United Kingdom) DKS Prosperity Management	10	(United Kingdom) Perry McCarthy	8-10
(United Kingdom) Worswick Engineering	17	(United Kingdom) Tony Worswick	5
(United Kingdom) Rex Hart Racing	20	(United Kingdom) David Mercer	1, 4–5, 7-10
(United Kingdom) Rex Hart Racing	20	(Australia) Lars Johansson	6

== Results ==
=== British Formula Two Championship ===
Round	Date	Circuit	Pole position	Fastest lap	Winning driver	Winning team
1	April 5	(United Kingdom) Oulton Park (Fosters)	(United Kingdom) Gareth Rees	(Italy) Luca Riccitelli	(United Kingdom) Gareth Rees	(United Kingdom) Super Nova Racing
2	May 6	(United Kingdom) Snetterton	(Brazil) Luiz Garcia Jr.	(Brazil) Luiz Garcia Jr.	(United Kingdom) Gareth Rees	(United Kingdom) Super Nova Racing
3	May 6	(United Kingdom) Snetterton	(United Kingdom) Gareth Rees	(Brazil) Luiz Garcia Jr.	(United Kingdom) Gareth Rees	(United Kingdom) Super Nova Racing
4	June 22	(United Kingdom) Silverstone (GP)	(Germany) Sascha Maassen	(United Kingdom) Gareth Rees	(United Kingdom) Gareth Rees	(United Kingdom) Super Nova Racing
5	July 6	(United Kingdom) Oulton Park	(Brazil) Luiz Garcia Jr.	(United Kingdom) Gareth Rees	(United Kingdom) Gareth Rees	(United Kingdom) Super Nova Racing
6	August 4	(United Kingdom) Donington Park	(United Kingdom) Gareth Rees	(United Kingdom) Gareth Rees	(Germany) Sascha Maassen	(United Kingdom) Fred Goddard Racing
7	August 27	(United Kingdom) Brands Hatch (Indy)	(South Africa) Werner Lupberger	(Brazil) Luiz Garcia Jr.	(South Africa) Werner Lupberger	(United Kingdom) Fred Goddard Racing
8	September 28	(United Kingdom) Silverstone (GP)	(United Kingdom) Gareth Rees	(Uruguay) Gonzalo Rodriguez	(United Kingdom) Gareth Rees	(United Kingdom) Super Nova Racing
9	October 13	(United Kingdom) Brands Hatch (Indy)	(Brazil) Luiz Garcia Jr.	(Uruguay) Gonzalo Rodriguez	(Brazil) Luiz Garcia Jr.	(United Kingdom) Super Nova Racing
10	October 27	(United Kingdom) Donington Park	(Brazil) Luiz Garcia Jr.	(Brazil) Luiz Garcia Jr.	(Brazil) Luiz Garcia Jr.	(United Kingdom) Super Nova Racing

== Championship Standings ==
Pos.	Driver	OUL	SNE	SNE	SIL	OUL	DON	BHI	SIL	BHI	DON	Points
1	(United Kingdom) Gareth Rees	1	1	1	1	1	5	Ret	1			56
2	(Brazil) Luiz Garcia Jr.	Ret	2	2	2	Ret	3	2	2	1	1	52
3	(South Africa) Werner Lupberger	4	3	3	Ret	3	Ret	1	6	3	2	35
4	(Uruguay) Gonzalo Rodriguez				Ret	2	2		Ret	2	3	22
5	(United Kingdom) Christian Horner					Ret	4	3	3	5	6	14
6	(Germany) Sascha Maassen				Ret		1		Ret	4		12
7	(Italy) Luca Riccitelli	2	4	Ret	Ret							9
8	(United Kingdom) David Mercer	6			4	Ret		4	5	7	8	9
9	(United Kingdom) Perry McCarthy								3	Ret	Ret	4
10	(Italy) Fabrizio Gollin	3										4
11	(Italy) Pietro Ferrero				3							4
12	(United Kingdom) David Cook									6	4	4
13	(Italy) Denny Zardo					4						3
14	(United Kingdom) Tony Worswick					5						2
15	(Russia) Alan Berkov	5			DNS							2
16	(Italy) Vito Popolizio		5	Ret								2
17	(Denmark) Jason Watt										5	2
18	(Republic of Ireland) Sarah Kavanagh				Ret		6					1
19	(Australia) Lars Johansson						7					0
20	(United Kingdom) Francis Phillips								7			0
21	(United Kingdom) Paul Smith										7	0
	(United Kingdom) William Hewland				Ret							
