= Marc Gené =

Spanish racing driver (born 1974)

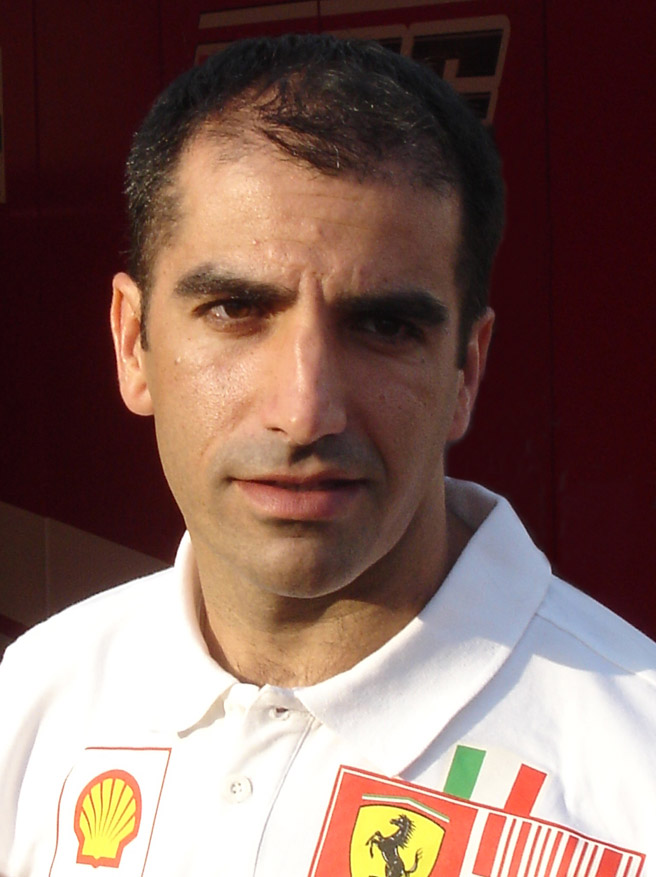
- Gené in 2007
- Born: Marc Gené i Guerrero; 29 March 1974 (age 52); Sabadell, Spain
- Relatives: Jordi Gené (brother); Eric Gené (nephew)

Formula One World Championship career
- Nationality: (Spain) Spanish
- Active years: 1999–2000, 2003–2004
- Team(s): Minardi, Williams
- Entries: 36
- Championships: 0
- Wins: 0
- Podiums: 0
- Career points: 5
- Pole positions: 0
- Fastest laps: 0
- First entry: 1999 Australian Grand Prix
- Last entry: 2004 British Grand Prix

24 Hours of Le Mans career
- Years: 2007–2014
- Teams: Team Peugeot Total, Audi Sport Team Joest
- Best finish: 1st (2009)
- Class wins: 1 (2009)
- Categorisation: FIA Platinum

Marc Gené i Guerrero (born 29 March 1974) is a Spanish professional racing driver. He is best known as a tester for Williams and Ferrari in Formula One, as a race driver for Minardi, and as a factory driver for Peugeot and Audi in LMP1. He won the 2009 24 Hours of Le Mans for Peugeot. His brother Jordi is also a racing driver, competing in the WTCC for SEAT.

Gené had 36 starts in Formula One, mostly through two seasons with the Minardi team, with which he scored a sixth-place finish at the attrition-filled 1999 European Grand Prix. He later raced for Williams three times as a replacement driver, and finished fifth at the 2003 Italian Grand Prix.

Starting from the 2010 season, Gené commentated on Formula One races for Spanish television on Antena 3. In 2013 he became an expert analyst for Sky Sport F1 HD in Italy. He also remains with Ferrari as their brand ambassador.

== Early years ==
Born in Sabadell, Gené finished runner-up in the 1987 Catalan Kart Championship (National Class) at the age of 13; he would win both this and the National Class Spanish Kart Championship in 1988. In 1989, he competed in both the European and World championships. Gené won the Senior Class of the 1990 Spanish Kart Championship, making him the youngest driver to do so. He competed again in the World Championship in 1991, placing 13th.

For 1992, Gené moved into Formula Ford, placing fifth in the Spanish championship with a win and two pole positions. He was runner-up in the 1993 European Championship, with one win and three podiums; also, Gené took second place at the Formula Ford World Cup and Festival. In 1994, Gené was named Rookie of the Year in the British Formula 3 Championship; he placed tenth in 1995. In 1996, Gené won the FISA Superformula championship, and in 1997 he competed in six rounds of the FIA Formula 3000 series, though he failed to score a point. In 1998, he won the Open Fortuna by Nissan Championship with six wins and three poles.

== Formula One ==
Gené got his big break in 1999, occupying a race seat with the Minardi team. It was a difficult year; however, after several ninth places and an eighth, he managed to score his first point, and Minardi's first since 1995, with a sixth place at the European Grand Prix, while his team-mate Luca Badoer broke down in tears after his car's gearbox failed and denied the Italian his first points finish in Formula One, as he was running in fourth place with 13 laps to go. Gené continued with Minardi in 2000, but failed to score a single point, with his best finish being eighth at the Australian and Austrian Grands Prix. His team-mate in 2000 was Argentina's Gastón Mazzacane, who also achieved a best finish of eighth, at the European Grand Prix.

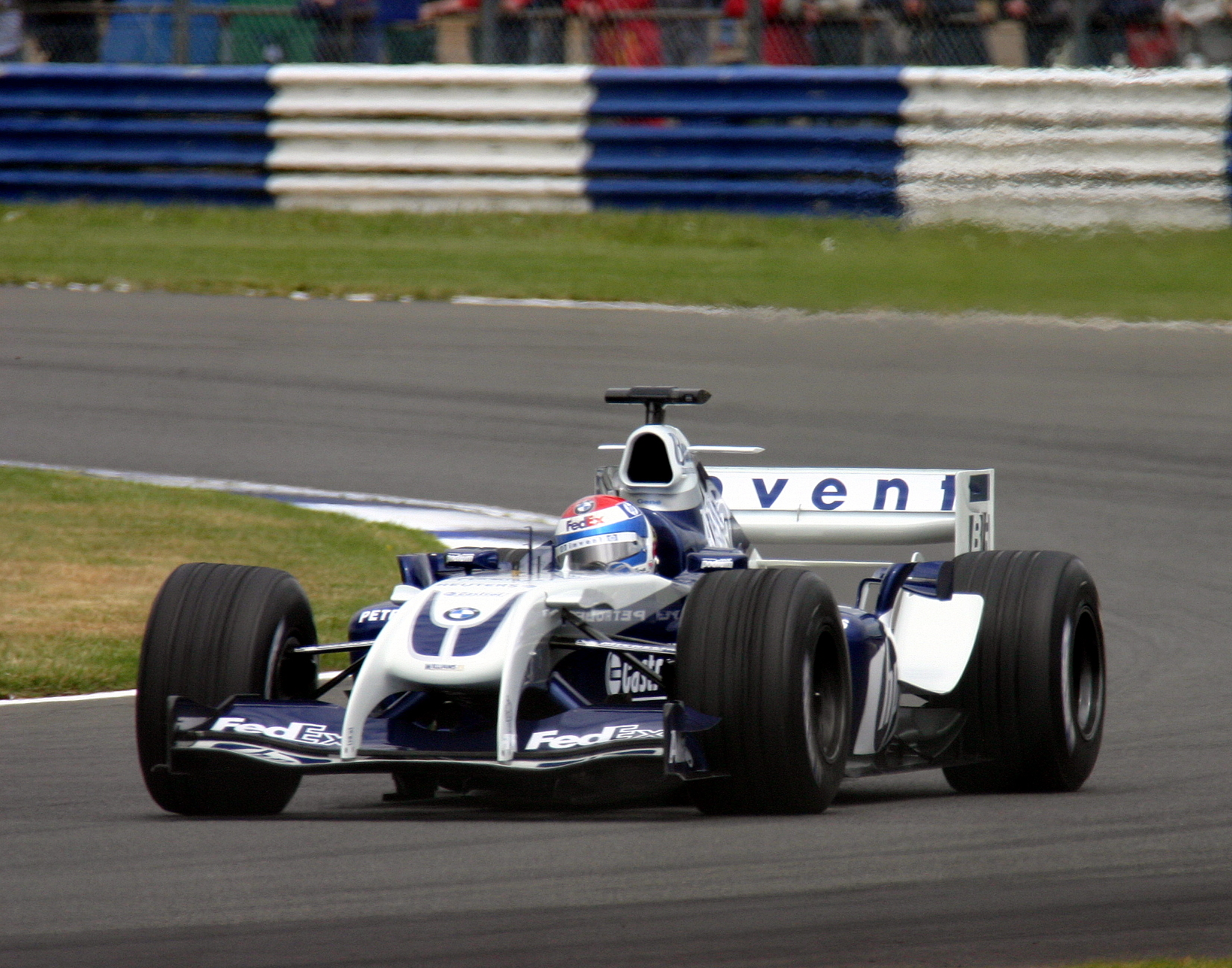
Gené during practice for the 2004 British Grand Prix.

=== Testing ===
Unable to obtain a quality drive for 2001, Gené opted to sign with Williams as test driver. He drove three Grands Prix for the team as temporary substitute. The first of these was the 2003 Italian Grand Prix, where Ralf Schumacher was unable to race because of a concussion. Gené replaced his teammate well, collecting four points for a fifth-place finish, but Schumacher was back in the car for the next race in the USA. Following a back injury to Schumacher at the 2004 USGP, Gené drove in the French and British Grands Prix, but subsequently lost the race seat to Antônio Pizzonia and did not race again in F1.

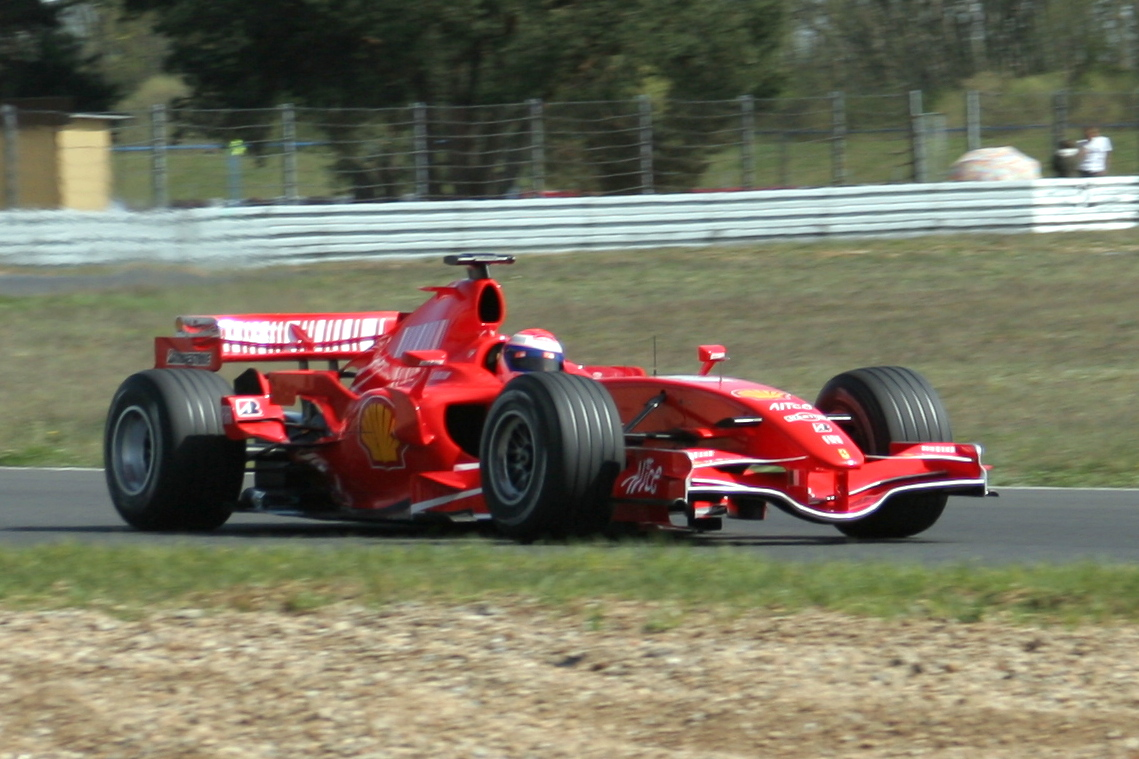
Gené testing for Ferrari in 2007.

In November 2004, Gené signed a deal to become a test driver for Scuderia Ferrari alongside former teammate Luca Badoer. His contract was renewed for 2007. A limit on testing in Formula One in 2007 and 2008 had restricted his involvement.

At the end of 2010, Gené along with Badoer and Giancarlo Fisichella was replaced by Jules Bianchi as Ferrari test driver ahead of the 2011 season.

== Sportscar racing ==
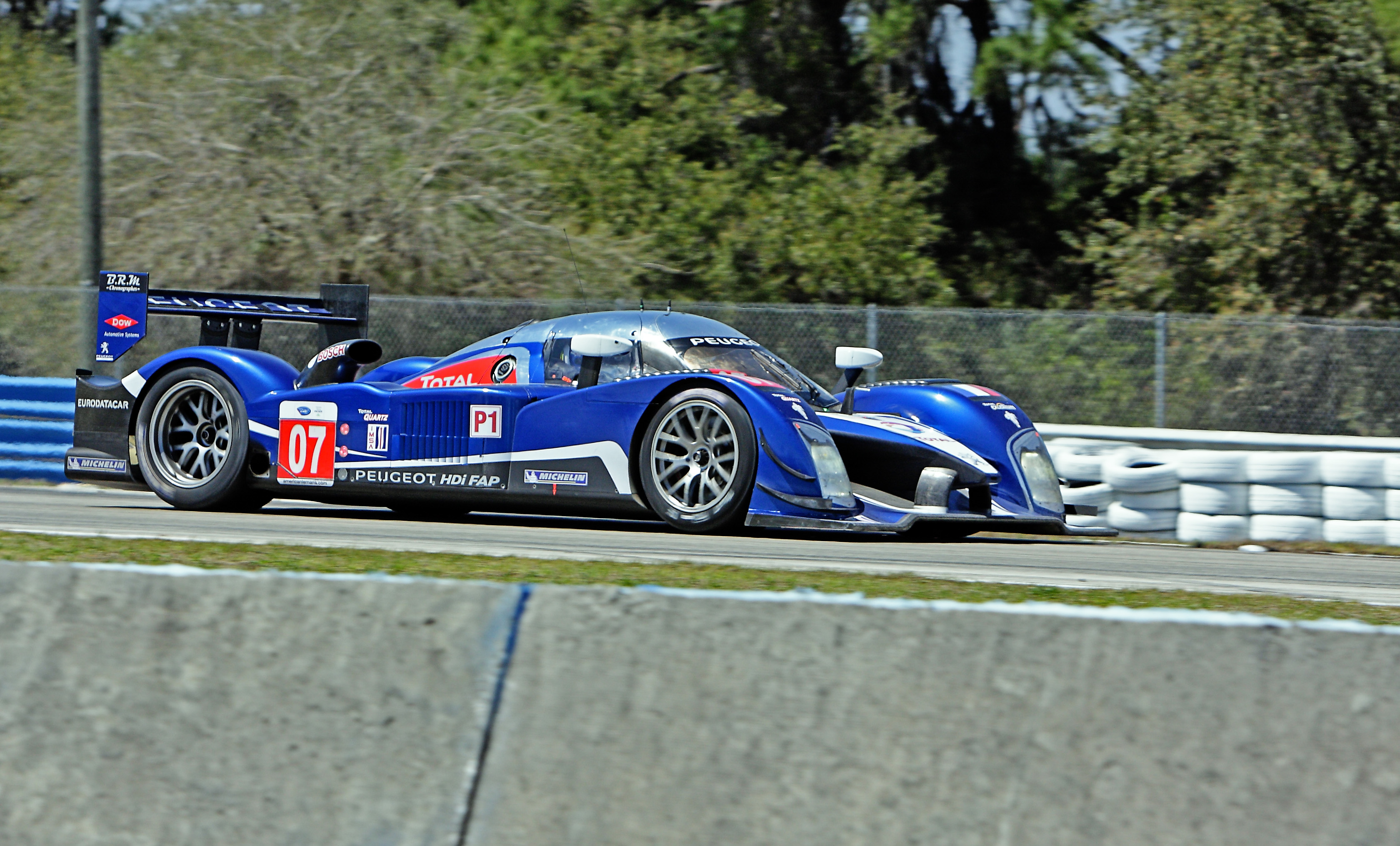
Gené won the 2010 12 Hours of Sebring with team-mates Alexander Wurz and Anthony Davidson.

Gené has also been hired by Peugeot as a factory driver for their 908 HDi FAP Le Mans Series effort, as well as the 24 Hours of Le Mans since 2007. In 2008, Gené crashed his 908 heavily in practice for the 2008 24 Hours of Le Mans, but escaped with a broken toe. A year later, however, there were no such problems, and the Peugeot he shared with David Brabham and Alex Wurz completed 382 laps on its way to victory in the 2009 24 Hours of Le Mans. He completed the last stint for the team and brought the 908 home to a standing ovation from the avid French crowd, who saw one of their cars stop the recent domination of Audi in the prestigious event.

In both 2008 and 2009, Gené also took part in the 1000 km Spa endurance race, winning in 2008 and finishing 12th in 2009.

Career Statistics (as of 2004 British Grand Prix)

- Grands Prix started: 36
- Points: 5
- Best Championship position: 17th (2003)
- Most points in one season: 4 (2003)
- Best race classification: 5th (2003 Italian Grand Prix)
- Best grid position: 5th (2003 Italian Grand Prix)

== Racing record ==
=== Career summary ===
Season	Series	Team	Races	Wins	Poles	F/Laps	Podiums	Points	Position
1992	Spanish Formula Ford Championship	?	?	1	2	?	?	?	6th
1993	European Formula Ford Championship	?	4	1	0	0	3	?	2nd
1994	British Formula Three Championship	Alan Docking Racing	17	0	0	0	0	19	15th
1995	British Formula Three Championship	West Surrey Racing	18	0	0	1	1	59	11th
1996	II Fisa Golden Cup Superformula	?	?	1	4	3	4	?	1st
1997	International Formula 3000 Championship	Pacific Racing	2	0	0	0	0	0	25th
1997	International Formula 3000 Championship	Nordic Racing	4	0	0	0	0	0	25th
1998	Euro Open by Nissan	Campos Motorsport	14	6	3	4	9	178	1st
1999	Formula One	Fondmetal Minardi Team	16	0	0	0	0	1	18th
2000	Formula One	Telefónica Minardi Fondmetal	17	0	0	0	0	0	19th
2001	Formula One	BMW WilliamsF1 Team	Test Driver						
2002	Formula One	BMW WilliamsF1 Team	Test Driver						
2003	Formula One	BMW WilliamsF1 Team	1	0	0	0	0	4	17th
2004	Formula One	BMW WilliamsF1 Team	2	0	0	0	0	0	23rd
2005	Formula One	Scuderia Ferrari Marlboro	Test Driver						
2006	American Le Mans Series	Risi Competizione	2	0	0	0	0	18	22nd
2006	Formula One	Scuderia Ferrari Marlboro	Test Driver						
2007	Le Mans Series - LMP1	Team Peugeot Total	6	3	0	0	4	33	4th
2007	24 Hours of Le Mans	Team Peugeot Total	1	0	0	0	0	N/A	N/A
2007	Formula One	Scuderia Ferrari Marlboro	Test Driver						
2008	Le Mans Series - LMP1	Team Peugeot Total	5	2	0	0	3	32	3rd
2008	24 Hours of Le Mans	Team Peugeot Total	1	0	0	0	1	N/A	2nd
2008	Formula One	Scuderia Ferrari Marlboro	Test Driver						
2009	Le Mans Series - LMP1	Team Peugeot Total	1	0	0	0	0	0	NC
2009	24 Hours of Le Mans	Team Peugeot Total	1	1	0	0	1	N/A	1st
2009	Formula One	Scuderia Ferrari Marlboro	Test Driver						
2010	Le Mans Series - LMP1	Team Peugeot Total	1	0	0	0	0	15	22nd
2010	24 Hours of Le Mans	Team Peugeot Total	1	0	0	0	0	N/A	N/A
2011	Le Mans Series - LMP1	Team Peugeot Total	1	1	0	0	0	0	NC
2011	24 Hours of Le Mans	Team Peugeot Total	1	0	0	0	0	N/A	4th
2012	FIA World Endurance Championship - LMP1	Audi Sport Team Joest	2	1	0	0	0	49	11th
2012	24 Hours of Le Mans	Audi Sport Team Joest	1	0	0	0	0	N/A	5th
2013	FIA World Endurance Championship - LMP1	Audi Sport Team Joest	2	0	0	0	2	45	9th
2013	24 Hours of Le Mans	Audi Sport Team Joest	1	0	0	0	1	N/A	3rd
2014	FIA World Endurance Championship - LMP1	Audi Sport Team Joest	1	0	0	0	1	36	12th
2014	24 Hours of Le Mans	Audi Sport Team Joest	1	0	0	0	1	N/A	2nd

=== Complete British Formula Three Championship results ===
(key)

Year	Entrant	Chassis	Engine	Class	1	2	3	4	5	6	7	8	9	10	11	12	13	14	15	16	17	18	DC	Points
1994	Alan Docking Racing	Dallara F394	Mugen-Honda	A	SIL	DON; 13	BRH; 18	BRH; 12	SIL; 20	SIL; Ret	BRH; Ret	THR; 12	OUL; 7	DON; 16	SIL; Ret	SNE; 8	PEM; 10	PEM; 10	SIL; 10	SIL; 9	THR; 10	SIL; 7	15th	19
1995	West Surrey Racing	Dallara F395	Mugen-Honda	A	SIL; 11	SIL; 10	THR; 6	THR; 7	DON; 22	SIL; 8	SIL; 23	DON; 3	DON; 9	OUL; 5	BRH; 7	BRH; 9	SNE; 11	PEM; 4	PEM; 13	SIL; 6	SIL; Ret	THR; 20	11th	59

=== Complete International Formula 3000 results ===
(key) (Races in bold indicate pole position) (Races in italics indicate fastest lap)

Year	Entrant	1	2	3	4	5	6	7	8	9	10	DC	Points
1997	Pacific Racing	SIL; 13	PAU; DNQ	HEL								25th	0
1997	Nordic Racing				NÜR; DNQ	PER; Ret	HOC; 8	A1R	SPA	MUG	JER; Ret	25th	0

=== Complete Euro Open by Nissan results ===
(key) (Races in bold indicate pole position) (Races in italics indicate fastest lap)

Year	Entrant	1	2	3	4	5	6	7	8	9	10	11	12	13	14	DC	Points
1998	Campos Racing	ALB; 1 Ret	ALB; 2 Ret	**CAT**; **1**; 1	**CAT**; **2**; 1	**JER**; **1**; 1	**JER**; **2**; 1	**DON**; **1**; 1	**DON**; **2**; 1	CAT; 1; 5	CAT; 2; 3	ALB; 1; 3	ALB; 2; 3	VAL; 1 Ret	VAL; 2 Ret	1st	178

=== Complete Formula One results ===
(key)

Year	Entrant	Chassis	Engine	1	2	3	4	5	6	7	8	9	10	11	12	13	14	15	16	17	18	WDC	Points
1999	Fondmetal Minardi Ford	Minardi M01	Ford V10	AUS; Ret	BRA; 9	SMR; 9	MON; Ret	ESP; Ret	CAN; 8	FRA; Ret	GBR; 15	AUT; 11	GER; 9	HUN; 17	BEL; 16	ITA; Ret	EUR; 6	MAL; 9	JPN; Ret			17th	1
2000	Telefónica Minardi Fondmetal	Minardi M02	Fondmetal V10	AUS; 8	BRA; Ret	SMR; Ret	GBR; 14	ESP; 14	EUR; Ret	MON; Ret	CAN; 16†	FRA; 15	AUT; 8	GER; Ret	HUN; 15	BEL; 14	ITA; 9	USA; 12	JPN; Ret	MAL; Ret		19th	0
2003	BMW WilliamsF1 Team	Williams FW25	BMW V10	AUS	MAL	BRA	SMR	ESP	AUT	MON	CAN	EUR	FRA	GBR	GER	HUN	ITA; 5	USA	JPN			17th	4
2004	BMW WilliamsF1 Team	Williams FW26	BMW V10	AUS	MAL	BHR	SMR	ESP	MON	EUR	CAN	USA	FRA; 10	GBR; 12	GER	HUN	BEL	ITA	CHN	JPN	BRA	23rd	0

=== Complete World Series by Nissan results ===
(key) (Races in bold indicate pole position) (Races in italics indicate fastest lap)

Year	Entrant	1	2	3	4	5	6	7	8	9	10	11	12	13	14	15	16	17	18	DC	Points
2003	Campos Motorsport	JAR; 1 Ret	JAR; 2; 2	ZOL; 1; 1	ZOL; 2; 13†	MAG; 1 Ret	MAG; 2 Ret	MNZ; 1; 4	MNZ; 2; 6	LAU; 1; 8	LAU; 2 Ret	A1R; 1	A1R; 2	CAT; 1	CAT; 2	VAL; 1	VAL; 2	JAR; 1	JAR; 2	12th	54

=== 24 Hours of Le Mans results ===
Year	Team	Co-Drivers	Car	Class	Laps	Pos.	Class Pos.
2007	(France) Team Peugeot Total	(France) Nicolas Minassian (Canada) Jacques Villeneuve	Peugeot 908 HDi FAP	LMP1	338	DNF	DNF
2008	(France) Team Peugeot Total	(France) Nicolas Minassian (Canada) Jacques Villeneuve	Peugeot 908 HDi FAP	LMP1	381	**2nd**	**2nd**
2009	(France) Team Peugeot Total	(Australia) David Brabham (Austria) Alexander Wurz	Peugeot 908 HDi FAP	LMP1	382	**1st**	**1st**
2010	(France) Team Peugeot Total	(United Kingdom) Anthony Davidson (Austria) Alexander Wurz	Peugeot 908 HDi FAP	LMP1	360	DNF	DNF
2011	(France) Peugeot Sport Total	(United Kingdom) Anthony Davidson (Austria) Alexander Wurz	Peugeot 908	LMP1	351	4th	4th
2012	(Germany) Audi Sport Team Joest	(France) Romain Dumas (France) Loïc Duval	Audi R18 ultra	LMP1	366	5th	5th
2013	(Germany) Audi Sport Team Joest	(United Kingdom) Oliver Jarvis (Brazil) Lucas di Grassi	Audi R18 e-tron quattro	LMP1	347	**3rd**	**3rd**
2014	(Germany) Audi Sport Team Joest	(Denmark) Tom Kristensen (Brazil) Lucas di Grassi	Audi R18 e-tron quattro	LMP1-H	376	**2nd**	**2nd**

=== Complete Le Mans Series results ===
Year	Entrant	Class	Chassis	Engine	1	2	3	4	5	6	Rank	Points
2007	Team Peugeot Total	LMP1	Peugeot 908 HDi FAP	Peugeot 5.5L Turbo V12 (Diesel)	MON; 1	VAL; Ret	NÜR; 2	SPA; Ret	SIL; 1	MIL; 1	4th	33
2008	Team Peugeot Total	LMP1	Peugeot 908 HDi FAP	Peugeot 5.5L Turbo V12 (Diesel)	CAT; 1	MON; 5	SPA; 1	NÜR; 2	SIL; Ret		3rd	32
2010	Team Peugeot Total	LMP1	Peugeot 908 HDi FAP	Peugeot 5.5L Turbo V12 (Diesel)	CAS	SPA; 4	ALG	HUN	SIL		22nd	15
2011	Peugeot Sport Total	LMP1	Peugeot 908	Peugeot HDI 3.7 L Turbo V8 (Diesel)	CAS	SPA; 1	IMO	SIL	EST		NC	0

=== Complete FIA World Endurance Championship results ===
Year	Entrant	Class	Chassis	Engine	1	2	3	4	5	6	7	8	Rank	Points
2012	Audi Sport Team Joest	LMP1	Audi R18 e-tron quattro	Audi TDI 3.7L Turbo V6 (Hybrid Diesel)	SEB	SPA; 1	LMS; 4	SIL	SÃO	BHR	FUJ	SHA	11th	49
2013	Audi Sport Team Joest	LMP1	Audi R18 e-tron quattro	Audi TDI 3.7L Turbo V6 (Hybrid Diesel)	SIL	SPA; 3	LMS; 3	SÃO	CTA	FUJ	SHA	BHR	9th	45
2014	Audi Sport Team Joest	LMP1	Audi R18 e-tron quattro	Audi TDI 4.0 L Turbo V6 (Hybrid Diesel)	SIL	SPA	LMS; 2	COA	FUJ	SHA	BHR	SÃO	12th	36

Sporting positions
Preceded by Inaugural	Open Fortuna by Nissan Champion; 1998	Succeeded by Fernando Alonso
Preceded by Allan McNish; Rinaldo Capello; Tom Kristensen	Winner of the 24 Hours of Le Mans; 2009; With: David Brabham & Alexander Wurz	Succeeded by Timo Bernhard; Romain Dumas; Mike Rockenfeller
