= Zak Brown =

American racing driver and businessman

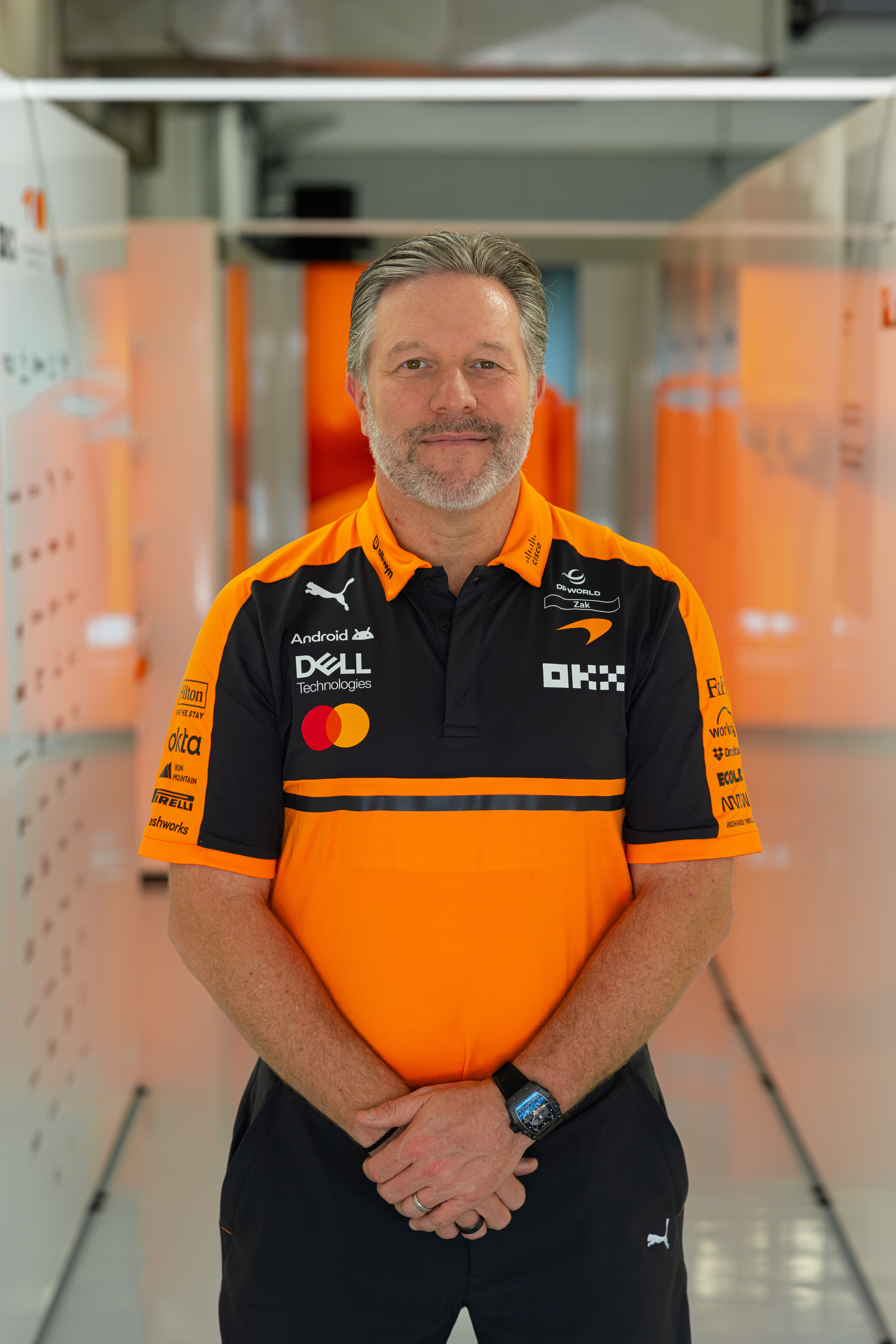
- Brown in 2026
- Born: Zakary Challen Brown; November 7, 1971 (age 55) Los Angeles, California, U.S.

Previous series
- 2012–13 2012 2012 2012 2010 2007–09 2005–06 2000, 2010–11 1999–2000, 2011 1997–98 1996 1996 1994–95 1994 1993–96, 1998 1992–93 1991: British GT Championship; Blancpain Endurance Series; Le Mans Classic; Rolex Monterey Motorsports Reunion; FIA GT3 European Championship; Ferrari Challenge North America; Britcar; Rolex Sports Car Series; American Le Mans Series FIA GT Championship; German Formula Three; Indy Lights; British Formula 3 EFDA Nations Cup; Toyota Atlantics; Opel-Lotus Benelux Series; British Formula Vauxhall Lotus; Formula Ford 1600

Championship titles
- 1988–90: International Kart Federation

Awards
- 2013–2019 2012 2012 2012 2005 2010 1994 1992 1986: Formula One Power List; NASCAR Power List; Formula One Power List; Sports Business Journal's 'Forty under 40'; Promo Magazine 'Marketer of the Year'; Jim Trueman Award; RFA Promising Young Star; AARWB Sports Car Driver; GCKS Rookie of the Year
- Occupation: Chief Executive Officer of McLaren Racing

Zakary Challen Brown (born November 7, 1971) is an American motorsports executive. He is the chief executive officer of McLaren Racing. Born and raised in California, Brown raced professionally around the world for ten years before focusing on motorsport's business and commercial worlds.

Brown co-founded and co-owns United Autosports, a professional team competing in international sportscar racing and various historic racing events around the world. United Autosports is a leading racing team competing in international sportscar racing, winning 6 championships and winning the 24 Hours of Daytona and the 24 Hours of Le Mans twice. He was the non-executive chairman of Motorsport Network, a global market-leading motorsport and automotive digital platform, between 2016 and 2019.

Brown has been recognised by a range of industry bodies and publications. Most recently, Brown received a TIME100 Impact Award on December 2, 2025 and was included in the Financial Times Most Influential of 2025 list. He was also included the Paddock Magazine F1 Power List and his induction into the Sports Business Journal "Forty Under 40" Hall of Fame, where he was listed three times. He was named Promo Marketer of the Year by PROMO Magazine, and Just Marketing, Inc. (JMI), a motorsports marketing agency founded by Brown in 1995, has appeared five times in Inc. Magazine's "Inc 500" annual list of the 500 fastest-growing private companies in the United States.

== Career ==
=== In racing ===
Brown began his racing career in karting in 1986, winning 22 races in five seasons from 1986 to 1990. He moved to Europe where his first win was in Formula Ford 1600 at England's Donington Park. In the 1992 Formula Opel-Lotus Benelux Series, Brown secured top-ten finishes in each of the season's races. The following year, Brown finished fourth in the series.

Brown has competed on both sides of the Atlantic, contesting North America's Toyota Atlantic Series in addition to the Formula Opel-Lotus Benelux Series and 1994 British Formula Three Championship. Brown made his Indy Lights debut at Laguna Seca in the 1995 season and competed in a German Formula Three Championship race in 1996.

In 1997, Brown competed at the 24 Hours at Daytona and 12 Hours of Sebring in the GT2 class with Roock Racing in a factory-supported Porsche 911 GT2, finishing second in both.

==== 2000s and beyond ====
Brown took a sabbatical from professional racing between 2001 and 2005 to concentrate on JMI, his motorsport marketing business. In 2006 he returned to the track with an entry in the Britcar 24 Hours race, winning his class as a member of the driver line-up for Moore International Motorsport. In 2007, he contested the Ferrari Challenge Series as part of a six-car stable fielded by Ferrari of Washington. At his debut in Fontana, he started in pole position and led every lap to claim victory. The following year Brown returned to full-time competition, with his Ferrari Challenge Series campaign highlighted by a win at Circuit Gilles Villeneuve in Montreal.

In 2009, Brown and Richard Dean co-founded United Autosports. In 2010 the team scored a third-place finish in the GT3 category at the Total 24 Hours of Spa and recorded its maiden class victory in the 2011 British GT Championship at Snetterton. In 2012, the team raced in both the Blancpain Endurance Series with a McLaren MP4-12C and the British GT Championship with an Audi R8 LMS. The team also competed in the Dubai 12 Hour race, the Bathurst 12 Hour, Macau GT Cup, and the Spa 24 Hours. Brown himself won the last round of the British GT Championship at Donington Park with Álvaro Parente as a wild-card entry for the team in a McLaren MP4-12C GT3.

In 2013, Brown competed in a full season of the British GT Championship with United Autosports in a McLaren MP4-12C GT3. Brown still races regularly in historic events, such as the Grand Prix de Monaco Historique and the Monterey Motorsports Reunion.

=== Management roles ===
In 1995, Brown founded Just Marketing International (JMI), which grew to become the largest motorsport marketing agency in the world. In 2013, JMI was acquired by CSM, a division of Chime Communications Limited, and Brown became the company's CEO. He relinquished that position in the winter of 2016 to focus on his responsibilities with McLaren.

==== United Autosports ====
United Autosports, one of the largest motorsport teams in the UK and competing globally in different sports prototype and GT categories across the world, is co-owned by Brown and racing driver Richard Dean. Founded in 2009, the team has raced in a number of championships using a variety of different cars across several classes and categories, with drivers including Fernando Alonso, Juan Pablo Montoya, Lando Norris; and Paul di Resta. The team currently competes in the FIA World Endurance Championship, European Le Mans Series, Michelin Le Mans Cup and GT4 European Series. It has also recorded podium success in other events around the world, such as the Macau GT Cup, the Spa 24 Hours, the Abu Dhabi 12 Hours and the Bathurst 12 Hour race in Australia.

United Autosports also operates a Historic Division, restoring, preparing and managing a range of historic sportscars and F1 race cars, some from Brown's own collection, as well as for customers. These compete globally at such events as the Rolex Monterey Motorsports Reunion, the Silverstone Classic, Monaco Historics, Le Mans Classic, Spa Classic, Nürburgring Old Timers, and Goodwood Festival of Speed.

==== McLaren Racing and other ventures ====
In 2016, Brown was announced as executive director of McLaren Technology Group, and in 2018 he became the chief executive officer of McLaren Racing under an operational restructuring. As Chief Executive Officer of McLaren Racing, Brown was the architect of McLaren's Constructors’ Championship wins in 2024 and 2025. He has overall responsibility for the business, including strategic direction, operational performance, marketing and commercial development. Since joining the team in 2017, he has led the transformation of the brand and culture of the McLaren Formula 1 team and put in place the people, resources, infrastructure and mindset that has enabled McLaren to return to racing at the front of the F1 grid. Brown has taken McLaren Racing onto a global motorsport stage, with McLaren teams now racing in IndyCar, the all-female F1 Academy series, and eSports, with the World Endurance Championship joining the line up in 2027.

In 2025, Brown released his first book, Seven Tenths of a Second, which quickly became a Sunday Times bestseller.

== Personal life ==
As a teenager, Brown competed on the game show Wheel of Fortune in 1984, where he won $3,050 from which Brown bought his first kart.

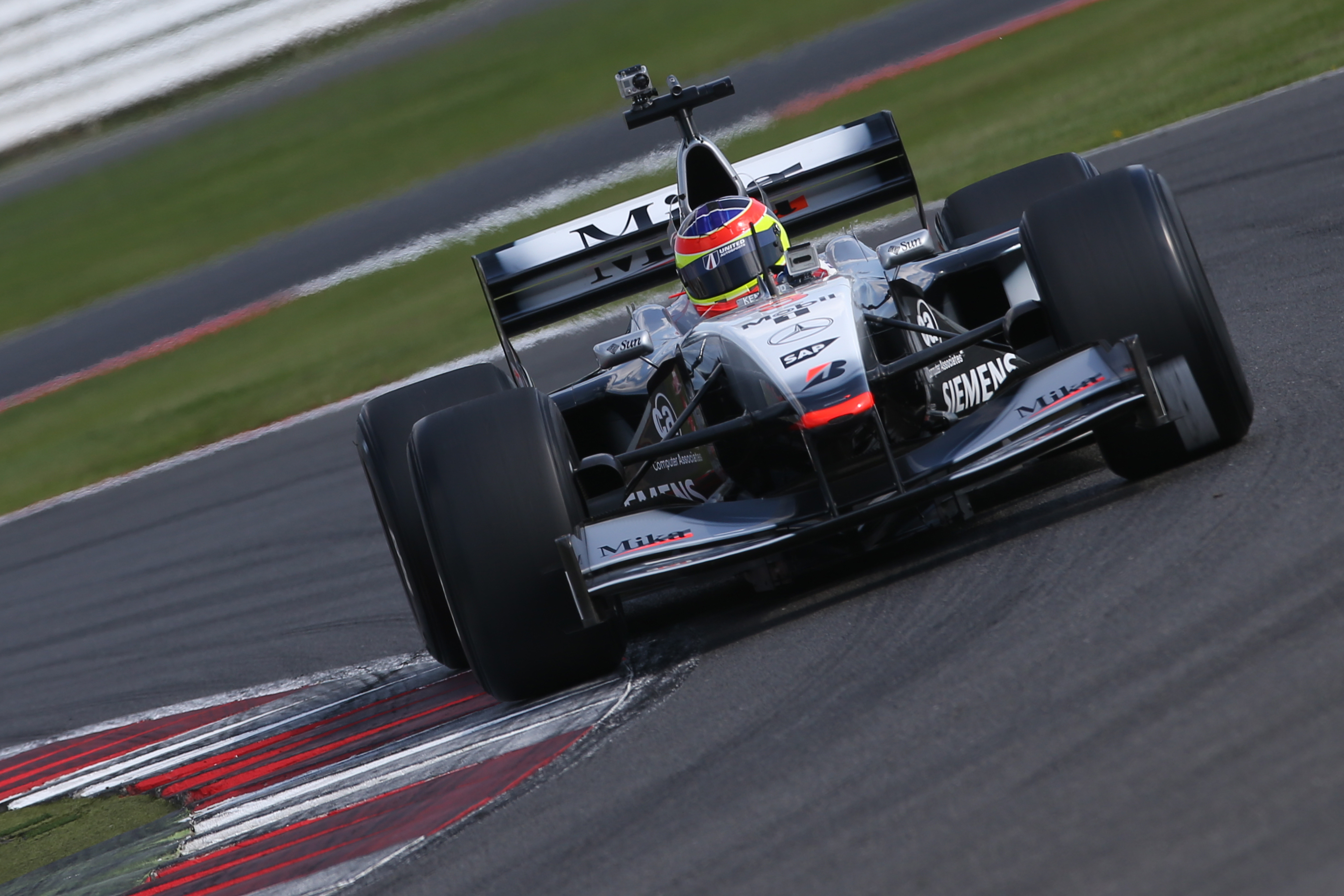
Zak Brown driving his McLaren MP4/16 at Silverstone

Brown is Jewish and was raised in the San Fernando Valley, Los Angeles, CA. He is married, has two sons, McGuire and Maxwell, and lives in Surrey, England. Brown has tattoos of the Autodromo Nazionale Monza and Miami International Autodrome, after Daniel Ricciardo's win at the 2021 Italian Grand Prix and Lando Norris's win at the 2024 Miami Grand Prix.

Brown is an avid collector of historical documents and sporting memorabilia, as well as both road and racing cars. His car collection is primarily housed in the workshop of United Autosports, the sports car team Brown jointly owns with Richard Dean.

The collection includes:

- Ayrton Senna's 1991 Monaco Grand Prix-winning McLaren MP4/6
- Dale Earnhardt's 1984 Chevrolet Monte Carlo NASCAR stock car
- Porsche 959 modified by Canepa
- Porsche 962, chassis 120
- Jaguar XJR-10
- McLaren Speedtail Pre-Production 1 (PP1), painted in Sienna Black
- Ferrari F50, painted in Giallo Modena yellow
- McLaren M8D
- McLaren MCL35M
- Mika Häkkinen's 2001 British Grand Prix winning MP4/16
- Nigel Mansell's 1993 IndyCar Series title-winning Lola T93/00
