= Jérémie Dufour =

French racing driver (born 1975)

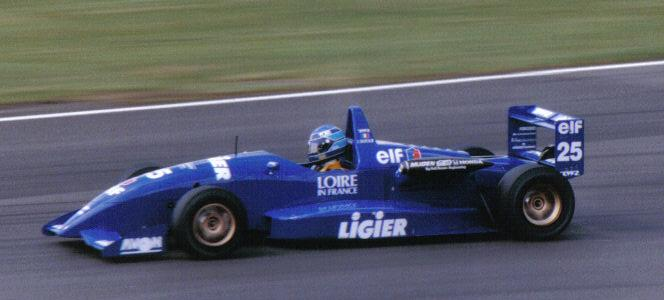
- Dufour in 1995
- Nationality: (France) French
- Born: 2 November 1975 (age 51) Roanne, France

Super GT
- Years active: 2001–2007
- Teams: Tsuchiya Engineering; SARD; Team Kunimitsu; Team Impul
- Starts: 41
- Wins: 3
- Podiums: 7
- Poles: 2
- Fastest laps: 0
- Best finish: 2nd in 2004

Previous series
- 2001 1993–1995: Japanese Formula 3 Championship; British Formula Three Championship

Jérémie Dufour (born 2 November 1975) is a French businessman and former racing driver.

Dufour was a Ligier junior in British F3, and tested in Formula One for Ligier in 1995 and Footwork in 1996. Dufour then competed in the All Japan Grand Touring Car Championship (JGTC) and its successor Super GT between 2001 and 2007. He was GT500 runner-up in 2004 for Denso Toyota Team SARD, and won the Suzuka 1000km in 2006 for Team Impul.

== Career ==
Dufour began karting at the age of 10, competing nationally before progressing to Junior ICA. He won the CIK-FIA Junior World Cup in 1990, ahead of Jarno Trulli, after a puncture for leader Bas Leinders, and placed third in the FIA Karting European Championship in 1991.

Dufour made his single-seater debut in 1992, finishing runner-up in the Class B of the French Formula Three Championship with three wins to his name. Following that, Dufour spent three seasons in the British Formula Three Championship, taking a season-high six fastest laps and four podiums for Fortec Motorsport in 1994, before scoring a lone win at Silverstone and fifth in the overall standings for the Ligier Junior Team in 1995. During this time span, Dufour won the Avon Park Supersprint and finished eighth at the Masters of Formula 3 in 1994 with Fortec.

At the end of 1995, Dufour partook in a Formula One test at Mugello with Ligier. In 1996, Dufour became a test driver for Footwork Arrows and drove the Footwork FA17 in free practice at the Argentine Grand Prix. In 1999, Dufour briefly returned to Formula 3 competition, finishing runner-up in the MRF Madras Formula 3 Grand Prix for Carlin Motorsport, and racing in the Pau Grand Prix for Graff Racing.

In 2001, Dufour moved to Japan, joining Inging in Japanese F3, and Denso Toyota Team SARD in the premier class of the All Japan Grand Touring Car Championship. In his only season in Japanese F3, Dufour scored a win at Fuji and eleven other podiums to secure third in the overall standings. In JGTC meanwhile, Dufour was 14th in GT500 with a best result of fourth at Mine with countryman Romain Dumas. Continuing with SARD alongside Manabu Orido for another campaign in JGTC in 2002, Dufour began the year with a second-place finish at Okayama, before scoring two top fives in the last three races to salvage 14th again. During 2002, Dufour also finished third overall at the non-championship Suzuka 1000km, sharing SARD's Toyota Supra with Orido and Nobuteru Taniguchi.

Switching to fellow Toyota customer Team Advan Tsuchiya for 2003, Dufour took a best result of third at Motegi with Seiji Ara to close out the year 13th in GT500. Returning to SARD for 2004, Dufour partnered André Couto for his best ever season in JGTC. He began with third at Okayama, before achieving his first GT500 win at Sepang and finishing second at Autopolis to secure runner-up honours behind the No. 1 Nissan.

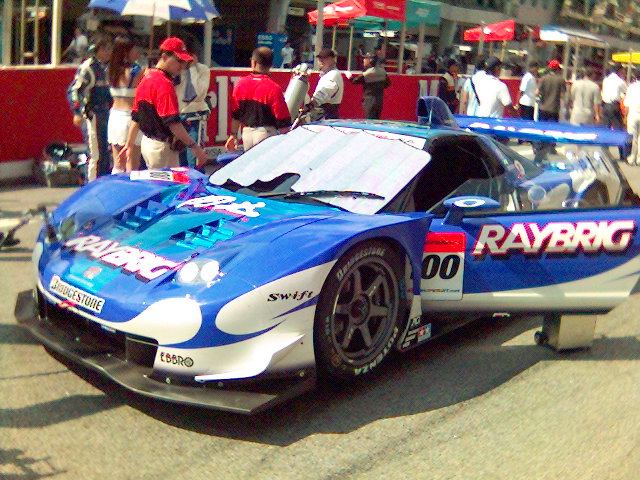
Dufour's Kunimitsu Honda NSX on the Super GT grid at Sepang in 2005.

For 2005, Dufour moved to Raybrig Team Kunimitsu to share a Honda NSX with fellow Frenchman Sébastien Philippe, as JGTC rebranded to Super GT. In his only season with Honda, Dufour won at Motegi to take 14th in GT500 as he fizzled out of full-time racing. Across the next two years, Dufour only made sporadic appearances in Super GT at the wheel of Team Impul's Nissan Fairlady Z, most notably winning the 2006 International Pokka 1000km at Suzuka with Kazuki Hoshino and Benoît Tréluyer.

In 2007, Dufour relocated to Kyiv, Ukraine, in a bid to create a Ukrainian Formula One team. After those plans went quiet, Dufour presented plans for a racing school in 2013, before signing a cooperation agreement with Kyivpastrans in 2015 to help public transport drivers with their professional skills.

== Personal life ==
Dufour was previously married to Alexandra, a Ukrainian woman.

In 2017, Dufour founded J Bikes, a website for selling or restoring bikes. In 2025, he began competing regularly in mountain and trail runnings around France, as part of the Athlé Vaison Ventoux club.

== Karting record ==
=== Karting career summary ===
Season	Series	Team	Position
1990	Karting European Championship — Junior A	Sodikart	4th
1990	Karting World Cup — Junior ICA	Sodikart	1st
1991	Karting European Championship — Junior A	Sodikart	3rd

== Racing record ==
=== Racing career summary ===
Season	Series	Team	Races	Wins	Poles	F/Laps	Podiums	Points	Position
1992	French Formula Three Championship – Class B	Mécathlon	10	3	2	?	5	78	**2nd**
1993	British Formula Three Championship	West Surrey Racing	14	0	0	0	1	11	9th
1994	British Formula Three Championship	Fortec Motorsport	16	0	0	6	4	103	7th
1994	Avon Park Supersprint – Formula 3	Fortec Motorsport	1	1	1	0	1	—N/a	**1st**
1994	Monaco Grand Prix Formula Three	Fortec Motorsport	1	0	0	0	0	—N/a	DNF
1994	Masters of Formula 3	Fortec Motorsport	1	0	0	0	0	—N/a	8th
1994	German Formula Three Championship	Pilette Speed Tradition	0	0	0	0	0	0	NC
1995	British Formula Three Championship	Ligier Junior Team	18	1	1	5	5	141	5th
1995	Formula One	Ligier Gitanes Blondes	Test driver						
1996	Formula One	Footwork Hart	Test driver						
1999	MRF Madras Formula 3 Grand Prix	Carlin Motorsport	4	0	2	0	4	?	**2nd**
1999	Pau Grand Prix	Graff Racing	1	0	0	0	0	—N/a	10th
1999	Masters of Formula 3	Carlin Motorsport	0	0	0	0	0	—N/a	DNQ
2001	Japanese Formula 3 Championship	Inging	19	1	3	0	12	177	**3rd**
2001	All Japan Grand Touring Car Championship – GT500	Denso Toyota Team SARD	7	0	0	0	0	22	14th
2002	All Japan Grand Touring Car Championship – GT500	Denso Toyota Team SARD	8	0	0	0	1	33	14th
2002	Suzuka 1000km	Team SARD	1	0	0	0	1	—N/a	**3rd**
2003	All Japan Grand Touring Car Championship – GT500	Team Advan Tsuchiya	8	0	1	0	1	35	13th
2003	Suzuka 1000km	Team SARD	1	0	0	0	0	—N/a	4th
2004	All Japan Grand Touring Car Championship – GT500	Denso Toyota Team SARD	7	1	0	0	3	61	**2nd**
2004	Suzuka 1000km	Team SARD	1	0	0	0	0	—N/a	DNF
2005	Super GT Series – GT500	Raybrig Team Kunimitsu	8	1	0	0	1	26	14th
2006	Super GT Series – GT500	Team Impul	1	1	1	0	1	32	13th
2007	Super GT Series – GT500	Team Impul	2	0	0	0	0	4	23rd

=== Complete British Formula 3 results ===
(key) (Races in bold indicate pole position) (Races in italics indicate fastest lap)

Year	Entrant	Engine	Class	1	2	3	4	5	6	7	8	9	10	11	12	13	14	15	16	17	18	DC	Pts
1993	West Surrey Racing	Mugen-Honda	A	SIL; 12	THR; 19	BRH; 3	DON; 6	BRH; 10	SIL; 10	OUL; 7	DON; 5	SIL; Ret	DON	SNE; 24	PEM; 6	SIL; 9	SIL; 12	THR; 5				9th	11
1994	Fortec Motorsport	Mugen-Honda	A	SIL; 7	DON; DNS	BRH; 4	BRH; 3	SIL; 13	SIL; 11	BRH; 20	THR; 5	OUL; 3	DON; 2	SIL; 2	SNE; 5	PEM; Ret	PEM; DNS	SIL; 4	SIL; 7	THR; 4	SIL; Ret	7th	103
1995	Ligier Junior Team	Mugen	A	SIL; 6	SIL; 7	THR; 4	THR; 4	DON; 7	SIL; 1	SIL; 2	DON; 2	DON; 7	OUL; 11	BRH; 6	BRH; 7	SNE; 3	PEM; 8	**PEM**; 2	SIL; 23	SIL; 23	THR; 5	5th	141

=== Complete Japanese Formula Three Championship results ===
(key) (Races in bold indicate pole position) (Races in italics indicate fastest lap)

Year	Team	Engine	1	2	3	4	5	6	7	8	9	10	11	12	13	14	15	16	17	18	19	DC	Pts
2001	Inging	Torii-Toyota 3S-GE	**SUZ**; **1**; 2	SUZ; 2; 3	TSU; 1; 2	TSU; 2; 2	FUJ; 1; 1	FUJ; 2 Ret	MIN; 1; 2	MIN; 2; 6	MOT; 1; 3	MOT; 2; 3	SUZ; 4	SUG; 1; 3	SUG; 2; 4	SEN; 1; 4	SEN; 2; 3	TAI; 1 Ret	TAI; 2; 12	**MOT**; **1**; 2	MOT; 2; 3	3rd	177

=== Complete JGTC results ===
(key) (Races in bold indicate pole position) (Races in italics indicate fastest lap)

Year	Team	Car	Class	1	2	3	4	5	6	7	8	9	DC	Pts
2001	Denso Toyota Team SARD	Toyota Supra	GT500	TAI; 7	FUJ; 7	SUG; 9	FUJ; 13	MOT; Ret	SUZ; 9	MIN; 4			14th	22
2002	Denso Toyota Team SARD	Toyota Supra	GT500	TAI; 3	FUJ; Ret	SUG; 12	SEP; DSQ	FUJ; 15	MOT; 5	MIN; 7	SUZ; 5		14th	33
2003	Team Advan Tsuchiya	Toyota Supra	GT500	TAI; 10	FUJ1; Ret	SUG; 4	FUJ2; 14	FUJ3; 17	MOT; 3	AUT; 12	**SUZ**; Ret		13th	35
2004	Denso Toyota Team SARD	Toyota Supra	GT500	TAI; 3	SUG; Ret	SEP; 1	TOK; 7	MOT; 6	AUT; 2	SUZ; 8			2nd	61
2005	Raybrig Team Kunimitsu	Honda NSX	GT500	OKA; 10	FUJ1; 11	SEP; 10	SUG; Ret	MOT; 1	FUJ2; 14	AUT; Ret	SUZ; Ret		14th	26
2006	Team Impul	Nissan Fairlady Z	GT500	SUZ1	OKA	FUJ1	SEP	SUG	**SUZ2**; 1	MOT	AUT	FUJ2	14th	32
2007	Team Impul	Nissan Fairlady Z	GT500	SUZ1	OKA	FUJ1	SEP	SUG; 7	SUZ2; Ret	MOT	AUT	FUJ2	23rd	4
