= 1998 Euro Open by Nissan =

Seasons
- ← none 1999 →

The 1998 Euro Open by Nissan was contested over 7 rounds/14 races. This was the first Open Fortuna by Nissan season which would go on to become the World Series by Renault. In this one-make formula all drivers had to use Coloni CN1 chassis and Nissan engines.

== Teams and drivers ==
Team	No.	Driver	Rounds
(Spain) Campos Motorsport	1	(Spain) Marc Gené	All
(Spain) Campos Motorsport	2	(Spain) Antonio García	All
(Italy) Scuderia Fama	3	(Portugal) Manuel Gião	All
(Italy) Scuderia Fama	4	(Italy) Stefano Sanesi	All
(Italy) ADM Competizioni	5	(Italy) Gianantonio Pacchioni	1-5
(Italy) EC Motorsport	6	(France) Patrice Gay	2-7
(Italy) EC Motorsport	23	(Argentina) Nicolás Filiberti	All
(Italy) First Grand Prix	7	(Italy) Riccardo Moscatelli	All
(France) G-TEC	8	(France) Frédéric Gosparini	All
(France) G-TEC	25	(Spain) Miguel Ángel de Castro	3-7
(Spain) Saturn Motorsport	9	(Spain) Lluis Llobet	All
(Spain) Saturn Motorsport	10	(Spain) Víctor Fernández	1-2, 4-7
(Spain) Saturn Motorsport	21	(Spain) Ricardo García Galiano	2-7
(Hungary) Formax Racing Team	11	(Hungary) Tamás Illés	1-5
(Spain) Elide Racing	12	(Spain) Polo Villaamil	All
(Spain) Elide Racing	16	(Spain) José Maria Pérez Fontán	6-7
(Spain) Elide Racing	25	(Spain) Miguel Ángel de Castro	1-2
(Spain) Gluckmann Racing	15	(Spain) Sergio García	All
(Spain) Gluckmann Racing	16	(Spain) José Maria Pérez Fontán	1-5
(Spain) Nokia-Meycom	17	(Spain) Angel Burgueño	1, 3-7
(Spain) Promodrive Racing	27	(Spain) David Bosch	All
(Spain) Promodrive Racing	28	(Spain) Ramón Caus	All

== Race calendar ==
Round		Location	Circuit	Date	Pole position	Fastest lap	Winning driver	Winning team	Report
1	R1	Albacete, Spain	Circuito de Albacete	25 April	(Portugal) Manuel Gião	(Spain) Antonio García	(Spain) Antonio García	(Spain) Campos Motorsport	Report
1	R2	Albacete, Spain	Circuito de Albacete	26 April		(Spain) Antonio García	(Spain) Antonio García	(Spain) Campos Motorsport	Report
2	R1	Barcelona, Spain	Circuit de Catalunya	23 May	(Spain) Marc Gené	(Spain) Marc Gené	(Spain) Marc Gené	(Spain) Campos Motorsport	Report
2	R2	Barcelona, Spain	Circuit de Catalunya	24 May		(Spain) Marc Gené	(Spain) Marc Gené	(Spain) Campos Motorsport	Report
3	R1	Jerez, Spain	Circuito de Jerez	27 June	(Spain) Marc Gené	(Spain) Marc Gené	(Spain) Marc Gené	(Spain) Campos Motorsport	Report
3	R2	Jerez, Spain	Circuito de Jerez	28 June		(Spain) Marc Gené	(Spain) Marc Gené	(Spain) Campos Motorsport	Report
4	R1	(United Kingdom) Castle Donington, UK	Donington Park	5 September	(Spain) Marc Gené	(Spain) Ángel Burgueño	(Spain) Marc Gené	(Spain) Campos Motorsport	Report
4	R2	(United Kingdom) Castle Donington, UK	Donington Park	6 September		(France) Patrice Gay	(Spain) Marc Gené	(Spain) Campos Motorsport	Report
5	R1	Barcelona, Spain	Circuit de Catalunya	3 October	(Portugal) Manuel Gião	(Argentina) Nicolás Filiberti	(Argentina) Nicolás Filiberti	(Italy) EC Motorsport	Report
5	R2	Barcelona, Spain	Circuit de Catalunya	4 October		(France) Frédéric Gosparini	(Spain) Ramón Caus	(Spain) Promodrive Racing	Report
6	R1	Albacete, Spain	Circuito de Albacete	17 October	(Portugal) Manuel Gião	(Spain) Ángel Burgueño	(Portugal) Manuel Gião	(Italy) Scuderia Famà	Report
6	R2	Albacete, Spain	Circuito de Albacete	18 October		(Spain) Ángel Burgueño	(Portugal) Manuel Gião	(Italy) Scuderia Famà	Report
7	R1	San Sebastián, Spain	Circuito del Jarama	7 November	(Portugal) Manuel Gião	(Spain) Ángel Burgueño	(Spain) Angel Burgueño	(Spain) Nokia-Maycom	Report
7	R2	San Sebastián, Spain	Circuito del Jarama	8 November		(Spain) Ángel Burgueño	(Spain) Angel Burgueño	(Spain) Nokia-Maycom	Report

== Championship Standings ==
=== Drivers ===
- For every race the points were awarded to the top ten race finishers: 20-15-12-10-8-6-4-3-2-1. An additional two points were awarded for having the fastest lap.

Pos	Driver	ALB 1 (Spain)	ALB 2 (Spain)	CAT 1 (Spain)	CAT 2 (Spain)	JER 1 (Spain)	JER 2 (Spain)	DON 1 (United Kingdom)	DON 2 (United Kingdom)	CAT 1 (Spain)	CAT 2 (Spain)	ALB 1 (Spain)	ALB 2 (Spain)	VAL 1 (Spain)	VAL 2 (Spain)	Points
1	(Spain) Marc Gené	Ret	Ret	**1**	**1**	**1**	**1**	**1**	**1**	5	3	3	3	Ret	Ret	178
2	(Spain) Angel Burgueño	7	5			5	Ret	3	3	2	9	2	Ret	1	1	126
3	(Portugal) Manuel Gião	**Ret**	Ret	12	5	3	2	5	16	**Ret**	**Ret**	**1**	**1**	**3**	**2**	118
4	(Spain) Polo Villaamil	2	2	4	3	2	9	8	Ret	DNS	10	8	6	4	3	118
5	(Spain) Antonio García	1	1	11	6	DNS	DNS	6	15	3	5	5	2	Ret	Ret	99
6	(Spain) Miguel Ángel de Castro	4	Ret	5	4	Ret	4	9	5	7	6	7	5	2	4	95
7	(France) Frédéric Gosparini	Ret	3	3	2	4	3	18	4	6	14	15	7	Ret	6	89
8	(Argentina) Nicolás Filiberti	3	Ret	9	8	6	6	10	6	1	2	4	Ret	Ret	Ret	83
9	(France) Patrice Gay			2	7	Ret	Ret	Ret	2	4	Ret	6	4	7	5	74
10	(Spain) Ramón Caus	8	Ret	8	12	12	11	4	7	9	1	10	Ret	10	8	47
11	(Spain) David Bosch	6	Ret	Ret	10	8	5	7	Ret	10	4	13	Ret	6	9	41
12	(Italy) Stefano Sanesi	9	6	13	11	7	8	11	9	8	8	9	Ret	5	Ret	33
13	(Italy) Riccardo Moscatelli	5	4	6	9	9	Ret	Ret	Ret	12	11	11	8	EX	Ret	31
14	(Spain) Sergio García	Ret	Ret	7	Ret	Ret	7	12	8	Ret	12	12	Ret	9	7	17
15	(Italy) Gianantonio Pacchioni	Ret	Ret	10	Ret	Ret	Ret	2	17	DNS	DNS					16
16	(Spain) Ricardo García Galiano			Ret	Ret	10	10	17	12	11	7	14	9	8	Ret	11
17	(Spain) Lluis Llobet	12	7	Ret	DNS	Ret	Ret	13	14	Ret	16	Ret	Ret	Ret	10	5
18	(Hungary) Tamás Illés	10	8	15	13	13	12	16	11	Ret	13					4
19	(Spain) Victor Fernández	Ret	9	Ret	DNS			14	13	Ret	Ret	DNS	DNS	Ret	Ret	2
20	(Spain) José Maria Pérez Fontán	11	Ret	14	14	11	Ret	15	10	Ret	15	Ret	DNS	Ret	DNS	1
Pos	Team	ALB 1 (Spain)	ALB 2 (Spain)	CAT 1 (Spain)	CAT 2 (Spain)	JER 1 (Spain)	JER 2 (Spain)	DON 1 (United Kingdom)	DON 2 (United Kingdom)	CAT 1 (Spain)	CAT 2 (Spain)	ALB 1 (Spain)	ALB 2 (Spain)	VAL 1 (Spain)	VAL 2 (Spain)	Points

Colour	Result
Gold	Winner
Silver	Second place
Bronze	Third place
Green	Points classification
Blue	Non-points classification
Blue	Non-classified finish (NC)
Purple	Retired, not classified (Ret)
Red	Did not qualify (DNQ)
Red	Did not pre-qualify (DNPQ)
Black	Disqualified (DSQ)
White	Did not start (DNS)
White	Withdrew (WD)
White	Race cancelled (C)
Blank	Did not practice (DNP)
Blank	Did not arrive (DNA)
Blank	Excluded (EX)

**Bold** - Pole
Italics - Fastest Lap

=== Teams ===
Pos	Driver	ALB 1 (Spain)	ALB 2 (Spain)	CAT 1 (Spain)	CAT 2 (Spain)	JER 1 (Spain)	JER 2 (Spain)	DON 1 (United Kingdom)	DON 2 (United Kingdom)	CAT 1 (Spain)	CAT 2 (Spain)	ALB 1 (Spain)	ALB 2 (Spain)	VAL 1 (Spain)	VAL 2 (Spain)	Points
1	(Spain) Campos Motorsport	1	1	**1**	1	**1**	1	**1**	1	3	3	3	2	Ret	Ret	229
2	(Italy) Scuderia Famà	**9**	6	12	5	3	2	5	**9**	8	8	**1**	1	**3**	2	134
3	(Italy) EC Motorsport	3	3	3	2	4	3	Ret	4	1	2	4	7	Ret	6	130
4	(Spain) Nokia-Meycom	7	5			5	Ret	3	3	2	9	2	Ret	1	1	126
5	(France) G-Tec	4	3	3	2	4	3	9	4	6	6	7	5	2	4	124
6	(Spain) Elide Racing	2	2	4	3	2	9	8	Ret	DNS	10	8	6	4	3	104
7	(Spain) Promodrive	6	Ret	8	10	8	5	4	7	9	1	10	Ret	6	8	67
8	(Italy) First Grand Prix	5	4	6	9	9	Ret	Ret	Ret	12	11	11	8	EX	Ret	31
9	(Spain) Gluckmann Racing	11	Ret	7	14	11	7	12	8	Ret	12	12	Ret	9	7	17
10	(Italy) ADM Competizioni	Ret	Ret	10	Ret	Ret	Ret	2	Ret	DNS	DNS					16
11	(Spain) Saturn Motorsport	12	7	Ret	Ret	10	10	13	12	11	7	14	9	8	10	16
12	(Hungary) Formax Racing Team	10	8	15	13	13	12	Ret	11	Ret	13					4
Pos	Team	ALB 1 (Spain)	ALB 2 (Spain)	CAT 1 (Spain)	CAT 2 (Spain)	JER 1 (Spain)	JER 2 (Spain)	DON 1 (United Kingdom)	DON 2 (United Kingdom)	CAT 1 (Spain)	CAT 2 (Spain)	ALB 1 (Spain)	ALB 2 (Spain)	VAL 1 (Spain)	VAL 2 (Spain)	Points

Colour	Result
Gold	Winner
Silver	Second place
Bronze	Third place
Green	Points classification
Blue	Non-points classification
Blue	Non-classified finish (NC)
Purple	Retired, not classified (Ret)
Red	Did not qualify (DNQ)
Red	Did not pre-qualify (DNPQ)
Black	Disqualified (DSQ)
White	Did not start (DNS)
White	Withdrew (WD)
White	Race cancelled (C)
Blank	Did not practice (DNP)
Blank	Did not arrive (DNA)
Blank	Excluded (EX)

**Bold** - Pole
Italics - Fastest Lap
