= Sarah Kavanagh =

Irish racing driver

- Nationality: (Republic of Ireland) Irish
- Born: 3 June 1973 (age 53)

Sarah Kavanagh (born 3 June 1973) is an Irish former racing driver.

== Career ==
Kavanagh entered the racing world in 1991 after a visit to Le Mans 24-hour race then dropped out of college, bought a 100cc racing kart, and began participating in Southern English championships.

Kavanagh made car racing debut in 1992. She competed in the British Formula Vauxhall Championship in 1995. The following year, she entered two rounds in the British Formula Two Championship.

Kavanagh visited Japan in 1997 and participated in Formula Nippon (now called the Super Formula Championship) representing Cerumo, becoming a topic of discussion as Formula Nippon's first female driver. However, in the opening round at the Suzuka Circuit she finished 14 seconds behind the fastest time, finishing near the bottom in the race. She again failed to qualify for round two held at the Mine Circuit, although was again allowed to participate after a petition, but she retired from the race due to brake failure. She then suggested to her team that she sit out from the third round, which they agreed to, though she did not reenter the series afterwards.

Kavanagh participated in Formula Nippon as the best place to aim for Formula One, but there were instances where she spun, crossed other drivers, and nearly contacted other cars, leading some to claim her driving was inexperienced and dangerous. The financial burden was also too great as participating in the series required her and several engineers and mechanics to travel to and from Japan from the UK for each race.

Afterwards, Kavanagh participated in the 2001 EuroBOSS in the Jordan 193. In November 2004, she announced she would be attempting to participate in the 2005 GP2 having secured a backer and being in talks with several teams.

Kavanagh has now retired from racing and lives in France with her husband and son, and her former personal website no longer available.

== Racing career ==
=== Complete Formula Nippon results ===
(key) (Races in bold indicate pole position) (Races in italics indicate fastest lap)

Year	Entrant	1	2	3	4	5	6	7	8	9	10	DC	Points
1997	CERUMO	SUZ; 14	MIN; Ret	FUJ	SUZ	SUG	FUJ	MIN	MOT	FUJ	SUZ	NC	0
