= 1995 British Formula Three Championship =

1995 British Formula 3 International Series

Seasons
- ← 1994 1996 →

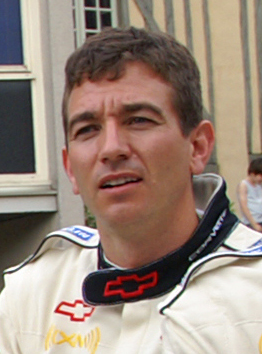
1995 champion, Oliver Gavin

The 1995 British Formula Three season was the 45th British Formula Three Championship, won by Oliver Gavin. The season started on 26 March at Silverstone and ended at Thruxton on 15 October following eighteen races. Having finished runner-up to Kelvin Burt two years previously, Gavin took the risk of dropping back down to Formula Three off the back of an unsuccessful season in Formula 3000 and was able to narrowly clinch the title at the final round from fellow Briton Ralph Firman. Class B was won by Martin Byford.

The scoring system was 20-15-12-10-8-6-4-3-2-1 points awarded to the first ten finishers, with 1 (one) extra point added to the driver who set the fastest lap of the race. All results counted towards the driver's final tally.

== Drivers and Teams ==
Team	No	Driver	Chassis	Engine	Rounds
Class A
(United Kingdom) Paul Stewart Racing	1	(United Kingdom) Ralph Firman	Dallara F395	Mugen-Honda	All
(United Kingdom) Paul Stewart Racing	2	(Brazil) Hélio Castroneves	Dallara F395	Mugen-Honda	All
(United Kingdom) West Surrey Racing	3	(Brazil) Cristiano da Matta	Dallara F395	Mugen-Honda	All
(United Kingdom) West Surrey Racing	4	(United States) Brian Cunningham	Dallara F395	Mugen-Honda	All
(United Kingdom) West Surrey Racing	19	(Spain) Marc Gené	Dallara F395	Mugen-Honda	All
(United Kingdom) Edenbridge Racing	5	(United Kingdom) Oliver Gavin	Dallara F395	Vauxhall	All
(United Kingdom) Edenbridge Racing	6	(United Kingdom) Steven Arnold	Dallara F395	Vauxhall	All
(United Kingdom) Alan Docking Racing	7	(United Kingdom) Warren Hughes	Dallara F395	Mitsubishi	All
(United Kingdom) Alan Docking Racing	8	(United Kingdom) Christian Horner	Dallara F395	Mugen-Honda	1-8
(United Kingdom) Alan Docking Racing	8	(United Kingdom) Owen McAuley	Dallara F395	Mugen-Honda	13-18
(United Kingdom) Alan Docking Racing	17	(Uruguay) Gonzalo Rodríguez	Dallara F395	Mitsubishi	All
(United Kingdom) Alan Docking Racing	18	(Belgium) Kurt Mollekens	Dallara F395	Mugen-Honda	All
(United Kingdom) Fortec Motorsport	9	(Brazil) Gualter Salles	Dallara F395	Mugen-Honda	All
(United Kingdom) Fortec Motorsport	10	(Brazil) Roberto Xavier	Dallara F395	Mugen-Honda	1-4
(United Kingdom) Fortec Motorsport	10	(United Kingdom) Jamie Spence	Dallara F395	Mugen-Honda	5-6
(United Kingdom) Fortec Motorsport	10	(United Kingdom) Jamie Davies	Dallara F395	Mugen-Honda	7-18
(United Kingdom) Fortec Motorsport	20	(Belgium) Geoffrey Horion	Dallara F395	Mugen-Honda	All
(United Kingdom) David Sears Motorsport	11	(Brazil) Luiz Garcia Jr.	Dallara F395	Mugen-Honda	All
(United Kingdom) David Sears Motorsport	12	(United Kingdom) James Matthews	Dallara F395	Mugen-Honda	All
(United Kingdom) Vincini Motorsport	14	(United Kingdom) Mark Shaw	Dallara F395	Fiat	1-6, 10-15
(United Kingdom) Vincini Motorsport	14	(United Kingdom) Dino Morelli	Dallara F395	Fiat	18
(United Kingdom) TOM'S GB	16	(United Kingdom) Jamie Davies	Dallara F395	TOM'S-Toyota	1-5
(United Kingdom) TOM'S GB	16	(Spain) Pedro de la Rosa	Dallara F395	TOM'S-Toyota	6
(United Kingdom) TOM'S GB	16	(United Kingdom) Jamie Spence	Dallara F395	TOM'S-Toyota	7-9
(United Kingdom) TOM'S GB	16	(United Kingdom) Christian Horner	Dallara F395	TOM'S-Toyota	10-18
(United Kingdom) DAW Racing	16	(South Africa) Garth Waberski	Dallara F395	Mugen-Honda	1-9, 11-12
(United Kingdom) DAW Racing	16	(United Kingdom) David Cook	Dallara F395	Mugen-Honda	16-17
(United Kingdom) DAW Racing	16	(United Kingdom) Paul Evans	Dallara F395	Mugen-Honda	18
(Germany) G+M Escom	22	(Austria) Alexander Wurz	Dallara F395	Opel	7
(Germany) G+M Escom	23	(Germany) Klaus Graf	Dallara F395	Opel	7
(Germany) G+M Escom	24	(Germany) Steffen Widmann	Dallara F395	Opel	7
(France) Ligier Junior Team	25	(France) Jérémie Dufour	Dallara F395	Mugen-Honda	All
Class B
(United Kingdom) DAW Racing	31	(South Africa) Werner Lupberger	Dallara F393	Vauxhall	1-13, 16-18
(United Kingdom) DAW Racing	32	(United States) James Carney	Dallara F393	Vauxhall	1-12, 14-18
(United Kingdom) Jason Rolf	33	(United Kingdom) Jason Rolf	Dallara F393	Mugen-Honda	1-2
(United Kingdom) Z-Speed	34	(United Kingdom) Martin Byford	Dallara F394	Vauxhall	1-17
(United Kingdom) Z-Speed	35	(Russia) Alan Berkov	Dallara F394	Vauxhall	7-17
(United Kingdom) TOM'S GB	36	(Japan) Takashi Yokoyama	Dallara F394	TOM'S-Toyota	All
(United Kingdom) Mark Bailey Racing	47	(United States) Zak Brown	Dallara F393	Mugen-Honda	6-7
(United Kingdom) Mark Bailey Racing	47	(United States) Tavo Hellmund	Dallara F393	Mugen-Honda	8-17
(United Kingdom) Mark Bailey Racing	47	(United Kingdom) Steve Allen	Dallara F393	Mugen-Honda	1-5
(United Kingdom) Mark Bailey Racing	48	(United Kingdom) Steve Allen	Dallara F393	Mugen-Honda	16-17
(United Kingdom) Mark Bailey Racing	48	(United Kingdom) Johnny Mowlem	Dallara F393	Mugen-Honda	1-7, 11-12
(United Kingdom) Prowess Racing	55	(United Kingdom) Philip Hopkins	Dallara F393	Fiat	1-9, 11-18
(United Kingdom) West Surrey Racing	70	(Australia) Russell Ingall	Dallara F394	Mugen-Honda	1-2
(United Kingdom) West Surrey Racing	70	(Saudi Arabia) Daoud Abou Daye	Dallara F394	Mugen-Honda	3-5
(United Kingdom) West Surrey Racing	70	(United States) Tony Renna	Dallara F394	Mugen-Honda	8-13
(United Kingdom) West Surrey Racing	70	(United Kingdom) Paula Cook	Dallara F394	Mugen-Honda	16-18

== Race calendar and results ==
Round	Circuit	Date	Pole position	Fastest lap	Winning driver	Winning team	Class B winner
1	Silverstone	26 March	(United Kingdom) Ralph Firman	(United Kingdom) Steven Arnold	(United Kingdom) Ralph Firman	(United Kingdom) Paul Stewart Racing	(United Kingdom) Johnny Mowlem
2	Silverstone	26 March	(United Kingdom) Ralph Firman	(Brazil) Cristiano da Matta	(United Kingdom) Ralph Firman	(United Kingdom) Paul Stewart Racing	(United Kingdom) Martin Byford
3	Thruxton	17 April	(United Kingdom) Warren Hughes	(United Kingdom) Oliver Gavin	(United Kingdom) Oliver Gavin	(United Kingdom) Edenbridge Racing	(United Kingdom) Martin Byford
4	Thruxton	17 April	(United Kingdom) Warren Hughes	(United Kingdom) Oliver Gavin	(United Kingdom) Oliver Gavin	(United Kingdom) Edenbridge Racing	(United Kingdom) Johnny Mowlem
5	Donington Park	23 April	(Brazil) Hélio Castroneves	(United Kingdom) Oliver Gavin	(Brazil) Hélio Castroneves	(United Kingdom) Paul Stewart Racing	(United Kingdom) Martin Byford
6	Silverstone	29 May	(United Kingdom) Ralph Firman	(France) Jérémie Dufour	(France) Jérémie Dufour	(United Kingdom) Ligier Junior Team	(Japan) Takashi Yokoyama
7	Silverstone	15 July	(United Kingdom) Oliver Gavin	(Spain) Marc Gené	(Brazil) Gualter Salles	(United Kingdom) Fortec Motorsport	(United Kingdom) Martin Byford
8	Donington Park	30 July	(United Kingdom) Ralph Firman	(France) Jérémie Dufour	(United Kingdom) Oliver Gavin	(United Kingdom) Edenbridge Racing	(United Kingdom) Martin Byford
9	Donington Park	30 July	(United Kingdom) Ralph Firman	(United Kingdom) Ralph Firman	(United Kingdom) Ralph Firman	(United Kingdom) Paul Stewart Racing	(United Kingdom) Martin Byford
10	Oulton Park	19 August	(United Kingdom) Ralph Firman	(United Kingdom) Ralph Firman	(Brazil) Cristiano da Matta	(United Kingdom) West Surrey Racing	(United Kingdom) Martin Byford
11	Brands Hatch	27 August	(United Kingdom) Ralph Firman	(United Kingdom) Ralph Firman	(United Kingdom) Ralph Firman	(United Kingdom) Paul Stewart Racing	(United Kingdom) Johnny Mowlem
12	Brands Hatch	28 August	(United Kingdom) Ralph Firman	(United Kingdom) Ralph Firman	(United Kingdom) Ralph Firman	(United Kingdom) Paul Stewart Racing	(United Kingdom) Johnny Mowlem
13	Snetterton	10 September	(United Kingdom) Oliver Gavin	(United Kingdom) Oliver Gavin	(United Kingdom) Oliver Gavin	(United Kingdom) Edenbridge Racing	(United Kingdom) Martin Byford
14	Pembrey	24 September	(United Kingdom) Ralph Firman	(France) Jérémie Dufour	(United Kingdom) Ralph Firman	(United Kingdom) Paul Stewart Racing	(United Kingdom) Martin Byford
15	Pembrey	24 September	(France) Jérémie Dufour	(United Kingdom) Oliver Gavin	(United Kingdom) Oliver Gavin	(United Kingdom) Edenbridge Racing	(Japan) Takashi Yokoyama
16	Silverstone	8 October	(United Kingdom) Warren Hughes	(France) Jérémie Dufour	(United Kingdom) Warren Hughes	(United Kingdom) Alan Docking Racing	(Japan) Takashi Yokoyama
17	Silverstone	8 October	(United Kingdom) Oliver Gavin	(France) Jérémie Dufour	(United Kingdom) Oliver Gavin	(United Kingdom) Edenbridge Racing	(United Kingdom) Martin Byford
18	Thruxton	15 October	(United Kingdom) Warren Hughes	(United Kingdom) Warren Hughes	(United Kingdom) Warren Hughes	(United Kingdom) Alan Docking Racing	(Japan) Takashi Yokoyama

== Championship Standings ==
Pos.	Driver	SIL	SIL	THR	THR	DON	SIL	SIL	DON	DON	OUL	BRH	BRH	SNE	PEM	PEM	SIL	SIL	THR	Pts
Class A
1	(United Kingdom) Oliver Gavin	9	9	1	1	4	12	8	1	5	13	4	3	1	13	1	Ret	1	3	184
2	(United Kingdom) Ralph Firman	1	1	Ret	2	Ret	2	3	Ret	1	9	1	1	Ret	1	7	DSQ	12	7	176
3	(Brazil) Hélio Castroneves	Ret	DNS	2	6	1	4	6	4	4	4	2	4	2	2	6	2	Ret	6	169
4	(United Kingdom) Warren Hughes	4	3	5	Ret	2	5	13	6	3	3	Ret	Ret	Ret	3	4	1	3	1	158
5	(France) Jérémie Dufour	6	7	4	4	7	1	2	2	7	11	6	7	3	8	2	23	23	5	141
6	(United Kingdom) Jamie Davies	5	Ret	10	Ret	15	DNS	Ret	7	2	6	5	2	10	20	3	3	4	2	107
7	(Brazil) Gualter Salles	7	6	3	8	14	7	1	5	6	2	Ret	10	6	5	8	Ret	DNS	4	106
8	(Brazil) Cristiano da Matta	2	4	Ret	Ret	Ret	DSQ	Ret	11	16	1	3	6	20	Ret	5	9	6	Ret	81
9	(United Kingdom) Steven Arnold	3	2	Ret	5	5	11	4	Ret	Ret	7	12	5	7	11	12	Ret	9	19	72
10	(United Kingdom) James Matthews	Ret	5	17	3	9	13	9	12	Ret	Ret	10	11	5	10	15	4	2	10	60
11	(Spain) Marc Gené	11	10	6	7	22	8	23	3	9	5	7	9	11	4	13	6	Ret	20	59
12	(Uruguay) Gonzalo Rodríguez	8	12	Ret	10	3	6	DSQ	10	13	Ret	Ret	Ret	9	9	11	5	7	9	42
13	(United Kingdom) Jamie Spence					6	3	5	20	8										29
14	(Belgium) Kurt Mollekens	13	13	13	Ret	12	15	11	9	12	Ret	8	8	8	7	9	Ret	8	Ret	20
15	(Brazil) Luiz Garcia Jr.	NC	18	15	Ret	17	10	10	14	10	14	Ret	Ret	4	Ret	Ret	17	11	8	16
16	(United Kingdom) Christian Horner	15	17	9	12	23	17	17	13		8	13	15	Ret	6	10	13	10	12	14
17	(United States) Brian Cunningham	10	8	7	Ret	21	Ret	15	Ret	11	Ret	22	12	13	Ret	Ret	7	Ret	Ret	12
18	(United Kingdom) Owen McAuley													12	19	Ret	12	5	13	10
19	(United Kingdom) Mark Shaw	24	Ret	16	11	8	21				10	9	Ret	15	Ret	Ret				7
20	(South Africa) Garth Waberski	14	Ret	8	Ret	Ret	14	Ret	8	Ret		Ret	DNS							6
21	(Austria) Alexander Wurz							7												4
22	(Belgium) Geoffroy Horion	16	14	11	Ret	10	9	Ret	15	Ret	12	11	13	Ret	12	14	Ret	18	11	3
23	(Germany) Klaus Graf							12												0
24	(United Kingdom) David Cook																14	19		0
25	(United Kingdom) Paul Evans																		15	0
26	(Brazil) Roberto Xavier	23	18	18	Ret															0
27	(Germany) Steffen Widmann							18												0
	(Spain) Pedro de la Rosa						DSQ													0
	(United Kingdom) Dino Morelli																		DNS	0
Class B
1	(United Kingdom) Martin Byford	19	11	12	14	11	Ret	14	16	14	15	17	16	14	14	17	10	13		284
2	(Japan) Takashi Yokoyama	17	19	19	Ret	13	17	Ret	Ret	Ret	Ret	18	19	19	15	16	8	14	14	190
3	(South Africa) Werner Lupberger	18	20	Ret	13	Ret	19	16	Ret	15	16	15	17	Ret			11	15	Ret	150
4	(United Kingdom) Johnny Mowlem	12	15	14	9	Ret	DNS	Ret				14	14							118
5	(United Kingdom) Phillip Hopkins	22	DSQ	20	Ret	16	21	19	18	Ret		Ret	20	18	18	DNS	16	17	16	115
6	(United States) James Carney	20	Ret	21	Ret	20	20	20	17	Ret	Ret	20	Ret		17	18	18	Ret	18	102
7	(United States) Tavo Hellmund								Ret	18	18	19	Ret	17	16	20	21	22		64
8	(United States) Tony Renna								Ret	17	17	16	18	16						63
9	(Russia) Alan Berkov							22	19	19	19	21	22	21	Ret	19	22	21		61
10	(United Kingdom) Paula Cook																14	16	17	32
11	(Saudi Arabia) Daoud Abou Daye			23	17	18														24
12	(United Kingdom) Steve Allen	Ret	DNS	22	Ret	19											20	20		24
13	(United States) Zak Brown						23	21												16
14	(United Kingdom) Jason Rolf	21	21																	14
	(Australia) Russell Ingall	DNS	DNS																	0
Pos.	Driver	SIL	SIL	THR	THR	DON	SIL	SIL	DON	DON	OUL	BRH	BRH	SNE	PEM	PEM	SIL	SIL	THR	Pts
