= Jamie Davies =

British racing driver (born 1974)

- Nationality: (United Kingdom) British
- Born: James Ronald Edward Davies; 16 February 1974 (age 52) Yeovil (England)

Previous series
- 2004 2004, 2006 2003, 2005–08 2002, 2008 1997–2000 1995–96 1994 1992–94: Le Mans Series; American Le Mans Series; FIA GT Championship; British GT Championship; International Formula 3000; British Formula Three; Formula Opel Lotus Nations Cup; Formula Vauxhall Lotus

Championship titles
- 2004 2003 2002: Le Mans Endurance Series; 24 Hours of Le Mans GTS; British GT Championship GTO

Awards
- 1994: McLaren Autosport Award

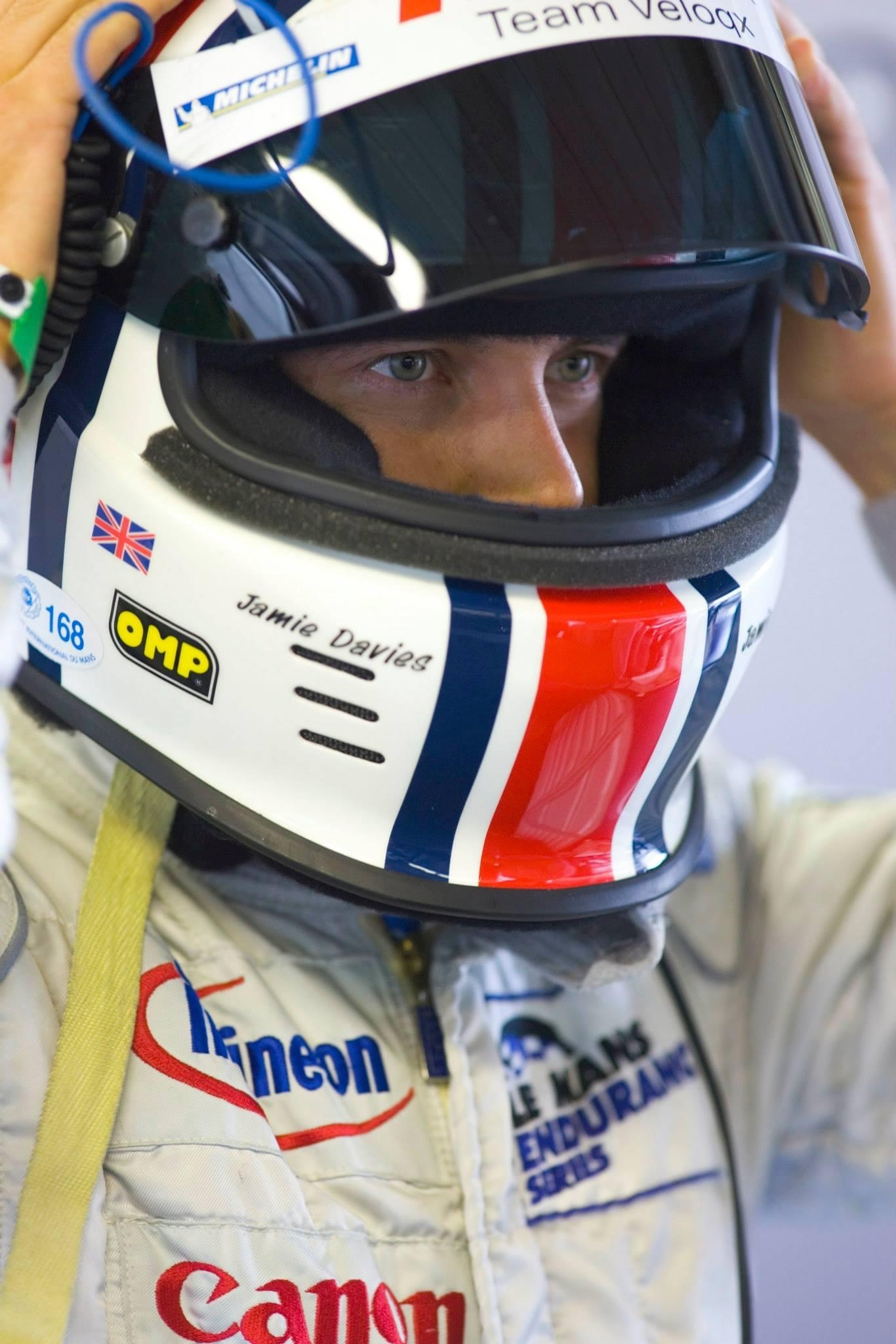
Davies

James Ronald Edward Davies (born 16 February 1974, in Yeovil) is a British racing driver.

== Career ==
=== Single-seaters ===
Davies began his career competing in karting, winning the South West Championship in 1988, the British Junior Championship in 1989 and the British Junior Open Championship in 1990. He started his circuit racing career driving in the Formula Vauxhall Junior Championship in 1992, winning numerous races before moving up to the Formula Vauxhall Lotus Championship for the 1993 and 1994 seasons. He finished runner-up in the standings in 1994 with five wins (one European round). He also won the McLaren Autosport BRDC Award in that year, which earned him a prize test with the McLaren Formula One team. He raced in the British Formula Three Championship in 1995 and 1996, winning two races and leading the championship before a different engine supplier was used by TWR halting his Championship campaign. He moved to the International Formula 3000 Championship in 1997, in which he raced for three seasons. After leading the championship with four podiums including one win during his rookie season, Davies ended the 97 Championship in fourth position. The following two seasons contained flashes of speed including podiums at Oschersleben and Monaco but never quite the repeat success of his rookie year. 1998 also saw Davies return to the McLaren Formula One team for more testing duties. Davies guest appeared in the 2000 International Formula 3000 Championship at Monaco where he qualified in fourth position and finished the race second overall.

=== British Touring Car Championship ===
Davies was due to race in the Snetterton rounds of the 1996 British Touring Car Championship in place of the injured Kelvin Burt at Volvo but a crash caused by a rear left puncher entering 'Richies' during the race weekend's Saturday free practice ruled him out.

Davies also tested a Production Class BMW 320i E46 for Edenbridge ahead of the 2002 season purely to give the team feedback on there race car for there season ahead.

=== Sports cars ===
Davies raced for Panoz at the Daytona 24 Hours, Sebring 12 Hours and the 24 Hours of Le Mans in 1998 and the 24 Hours of Le Mans in 2001. For 2002 he moved to the British GT Championship, in which he won the GTO class. In 2003, he competed in the FIA GT Championship and also won his class at the 24 Hours of Le Mans at the wheel of a Prodrive 550 GTS Ferrari. In 2004, he finished third overall at the Sebring 12 Hours and won the Le Mans Endurance Series overall sharing an Audi R8 with Johnny Herbert. He also finished runner-up overall at the 24 Hours of Le Mans having set the fastest race lap and starting the race from pole position. In 2005, he raced as a Pirelli works driver guesting in the FIA GT Championship, driving at Spa and Bahrain in a Maserati MC12 GT1, setting the fastest lap in Spa and finishing runner-up overall in Bahrain, again setting the fastest race lap. In 2006, again as a Pirelli driver, he raced for Vitaphone Racing in the FIA GT Championship, driving a Maserati MC12 GT1 with several overall victories and podium finishes. In 2007, continuing with Pirelli, he raced in the series for Aston Martin Racing BMS Scuderia Italia. In 2008, he raced in the GT2 category of the series with Pirelli again, driving for Scuderia Ecosse.

=== Complete 24 Hours of Le Mans results ===
| Year | Team | Co-Drivers | Car | Class | Laps | Pos. | Class Pos. |
|---|---|---|---|---|---|---|---|
| 1998 | (United States) Panoz Motorsports Inc. | (Australia) David Brabham (United Kingdom) Andy Wallace | Panoz Esperante GTR-1 | GT1 | 335 | 7th | 7th |
| 2001 | (United States) Panoz Motorsports | (Germany) Klaus Graf (South Africa) Gary Formato | Panoz LMP07-Élan | LMP900 | 86 | DNF | DNF |
| 2003 | (United Kingdom) Veloqx Prodrive Racing | (Czech Republic) Tomáš Enge (Netherlands) Peter Kox | Ferrari 550-GTS Maranello | GTS | 336 | 10th | 1st |
| 2004 | (United Kingdom) Audi Sport UK Team Veloqx | (United Kingdom) Johnny Herbert (United Kingdom) Guy Smith | Audi R8 | LMP1 | 379 | 2nd | 2nd |
| 2007 | (Italy) Aston Martin Racing BMS | (Italy) Fabio Babini (Italy) Matteo Malucelli | Aston Martin DBR9 | GT1 | 336 | 11th | 6th |

Sporting positions
| Preceded by Kelvin Burt; Marino Franchitti | British GT Champion; GTO Class; 2002 | Succeeded by Tom Herridge |
| Preceded by Ron Fellows; Johnny O'Connell; Oliver Gavin | 24 Hours of Le Mans GTS Class with: Tomáš Enge; Peter Kox; 2003 | Succeeded by Oliver Gavin; Olivier Beretta; Jan Magnussen |
| Preceded by Inaugural championship | Le Mans Series LMP1 Class with: Johnny Herbert; 2004 | Succeeded by Jean-Christophe Boullion; Emmanuel Collard |
Awards and achievements
| Preceded by Ralph Firman | McLaren Autosport BRDC Award; 1994 | Succeeded by Jonny Kane |
