= Gareth Rees (motorsport commentator) =

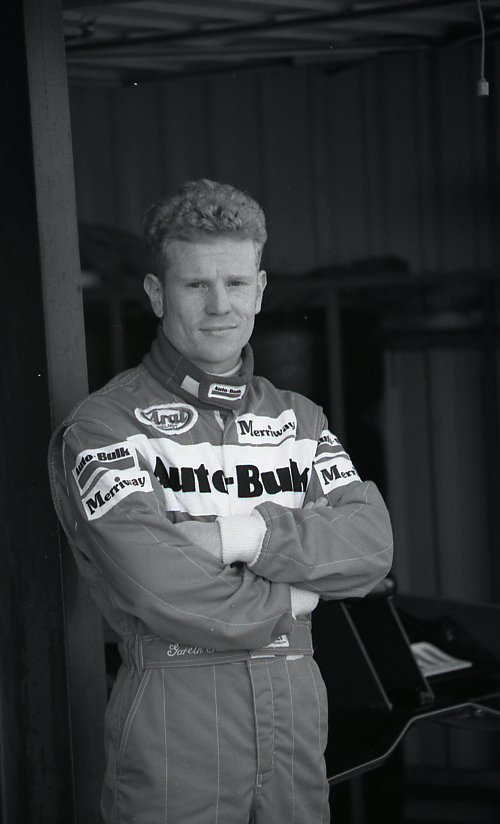
- Born: 12 March 1969 (age 57)

Championship titles
- 1994 1996: Masters of Formula 3 British Formula Two Championship

Awards
- 1990: McLaren Autosport BRDC Award

Gareth Rees (born 12 March 1969) is a Welsh motorsport commentator and former racing driver.

He has commentated on a wide variety of series, including Champ Car, IndyCar, the World Series, Formula 3000, Euro 3000, DTM and GP2. Rees has worked for both British Eurosport and Motors TV.

== Career ==
Following the birth of his first child, Rees considered scaling back his media work in order to spend more time with his family. Having decided to continue covering GP2, Rees was informed by British Eurosport that they had lost the broadcasting rights for the 2008 season to rival ITV. In the light of this news, Rees decided to reduce his commentary commitments, after all. Since making the decision, he has commentated on the DTM, for Motors TV, on a part-time basis.

Rees used to be a racing driver himself. Despite achieving considerable success in junior categories (winning the Formula Opel Euroseries, Marlboro Masters and British Formula Two Championship), the Welshman retired from competition in 1998, unable to secure funding to further his career. Outside of motor racing, Rees is a big Cardiff City supporter, holding a season ticket at the club.

Awards
Preceded by David Coulthard	McLaren Autosport BRDC Award; 1990	Succeeded by Oliver Gavin
Sporting positions
Preceded by Jos Verstappen	Formula Three Masters Winner; 1994	Succeeded by Norberto Fontana
Preceded by José Luis Di Palma (1994)	British Formula 2 champion 1996	Succeeded by None
