= Jamie Spence (racing driver) =

British racing driver (born 1973)

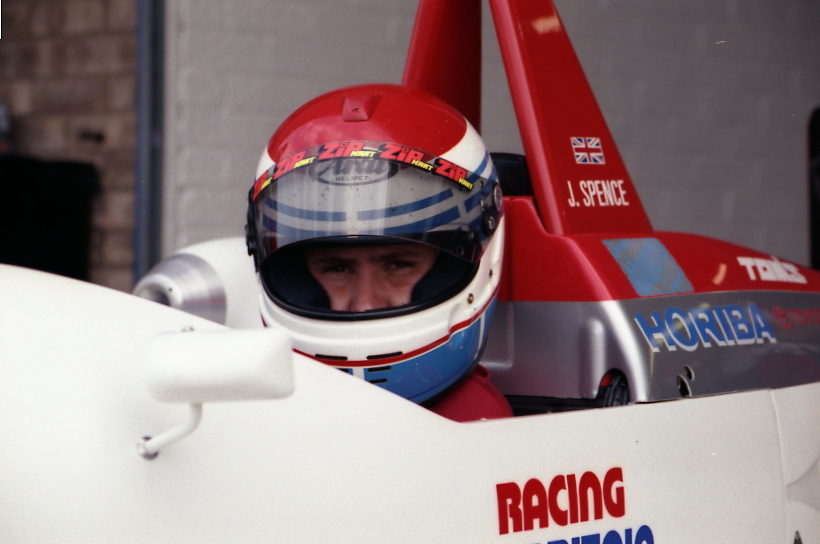
- Jamie Spence, Donington British F3 1996
- Nationality: (United Kingdom) British
- Born: 11 July 1973 (age 52)

Jamie Spence (born 11 July 1973) is a British racing driver. He was British Formula Ford champion in 1992. He went on to be 1993 British Formula Three national class champion. In 1996, he competed in the final two rounds of the British Touring Car Championship at Brands Hatch for Rouse Sport in a Nissan Primera. He was one of the intended drivers for Andy Rouse's stillborn Toyota Corolla entry in 1998 and also for former teammate Gary Ayles' failed 2005 entry in an Alfa Romeo 156.

== Racing record ==
=== Complete British Touring Car Championship results ===
(key) (Races in bold indicate pole position - 1 point awarded all races) (Races in italics indicate fastest lap)

Year	Team	Car	1	2	3	4	5	6	7	8	9	10	11	12	13	14	15	16	17	18	19	20	21	22	23	24	25	26	Pos	Pts
1996	Rouse Sport	Nissan Primera eGT	DON; 1	DON; 2	BRH; 1	BRH; 2	THR; 1	THR; 2	SIL; 1	SIL; 2	OUL; 1	OUL; 2	SNE; 1	SNE; 2	BRH; 1	BRH; 2	SIL; 1	SIL; 2	KNO; 1	KNO; 2	OUL; 1	OUL; 2	THR; 1	THR; 2	DON; 1	DON; 2	BRH; 1; 11	BRH; 2 Ret	NC	0

Sporting positions
Preceded by Marc Goossens	British Formula Ford; Champion; 1992	Succeeded by Russell Ingall
