= Moosehead Grand Prix =

Annual auto race in Nova Scotia, Canada

AIS, British F2, IMSA GT
- Location: Citadel Hill (Fort George), Halifax, Nova Scotia, Canada; 44°38′56″N 63°34′48″W
- Corporate sponsor: Moosehead Breweries
- First race: 1990
- Last race: 1995

Circuit information
- Surface: Asphalt
- Length: 1.85 km (1.15 mi)
- Turns: 8
- Lap record: 0:45.357 ( (Italy) Andrea Montermini, Reynard 91D, 1993, Formula 3000)

The Moosehead Grand Prix was an annual auto race held in Halifax, Nova Scotia, Canada. The race took place on a 1.15 mile (1.851 km) street circuit next to Citadel Hill from 1990 until 1993. The race moved to a 1.45 mile (2.333 km) circuit on the runways of Canadian Forces Base Shearwater for 1994 and 1995.

== History ==
Following the success of the Labatt sponsored Canadian Grand Prix in Montreal, the Molson sponsored IndyCar races in Toronto and Vancouver and the Grand Prix of Trois-Rivières, Moosehead Breweries wanted a high-profile city street race in Atlantic Canada to promote their brand.

The Moosehead Grand Prix was launched in 1990 with an American Indycar Series race on the streets next to Citadel Hill in downtown Halifax attracting 30,000 fans the first year. The American IndyCar Series was replaced with the British Formula 2 Championship as the headliner in 1993 and 1994, with the IMSA GT Championship headlining the final year in 1995.

Other support series races included the Player's Toyota Atlantic Championship, Rothmans Porsche Turbo Cup, Player's GM Motorsport Series and the Canadian Formula Ford Championship.

== Lap records ==
The fastest official race lap records at the Moosehead Grand Prix are listed as:

Category	Time	Driver	Vehicle	Event
Grand Prix Circuit: 1.850 km (1990–1995)
Formula 3000	0:45.357	Andrea Montermini	Reynard 91D	1993 Moosehead Grand Prix
Formula Atlantic	0:47.625	Mark Dismore	Swift DB4	1993 Mooshead Grand Prix at Halifax
WSC	1:05.269	Wayne Taylor	Ferrari 333 SP	1995 Halifax 3 Hours
IMSA GTS-1	1:09.654	Irv Hoerr	Oldsmobile Cutlass Supreme	1995 Halifax 3 Hours
IMSA GTS-2	1:14.005	Bill Auberlen	Porsche 911	1995 Halifax 3 Hours
Porsche Turbo Cup	1:16.306	Bill Adam	Porsche 944	1990 Moosehead Grand Prix

== Winners ==
=== American Indycar Series ===
Year	Date	Driver
1990	Aug 10	(United States) Bill Tempero
1991	Sept 15	(United States) Jimmy Santos
1992	Sept 13	(United States) Ken Petrie

=== British F2 Championship ===
Season	Date	Laps	Winning driver	Team	Chassis/Engine
1993	July 11	70	(Italy) Andrea Montermini	Junior Team	Reynard 91D-Cosworth
1994	July 10	60	(Mexico) Gianfranco Cane	Fred Goddard Racing	Reynard 90D-Cosworth

=== IMSA Exxon World Sports Car Championship and Supreme GT Series ===
Year	Date	Laps	WSC Winning Team	GTS-1 Winning Team	GTS-2 Winning Team
Year	Date	Laps	WSC Winning Drivers	GTS-1 Winning Drivers	GTS-2 Winning Drivers
1995	May 21	158 Laps	(United States) #3 Scandia Racing Team; Ferrari 333 SP	(United States) #75 Cunningham Racing; Nissan 300ZX V8	(Costa Rica) #55 Jorge Trejos; Porsche 911 Carrera RSR
1995	May 21	158 Laps	(Spain) Fermín Vélez (Italy) Mauro Baldi	(United States) Johnny O'Connell	(Costa Rica) Jorge Trejos (United States) Danny Aase

=== Player's Toyota Atlantic Championship ===
Year	Date	Laps	Driver	Car
1993	July 11	60	(Canada) Trevor Seibert	Swift DB-4/Toyota

=== Rothmans Porsche Turbo Cup ===
Year	Date	Laps	Driver	Car
1990	Oct 7	19	(Canada) David Tennyson	Porsche 944 Turbo Cup

== See also ==
- Atlantic Motorsport Park
