= 1991 British Formula 3000 Championship =

Seasons
- ← 1990 1992 →

The 1991 British Formula 3000 Championship was the third season of the British Formula 3000 Championship. The series was won posthumously by Paul Warwick, driving for Mansell Madgwick Motorsport. He was tragically killed in an accident at Oulton Park when leading. Fredrik Ekblom finished as runner-up for AJS/GP. Julian Westwood finished third overall for CaneCordy Motorsport, a new team formed by ex-Williams personnel Michael Cane and Colin Cordy. Richard Dean was fourth with Superpower (pictured). Future International F3000 team Durango made their British F3000 debut. Kenny Brack, who would become 1996 International F3000 runner-up, 1998 IRL champion and a CART frontrunner, made a one-off appearance with the Alan Langridge team. Future Brabham female F1 driver Giovanna Amati made a couple of appearances for the GJ-Bromley team.

== Drivers and teams ==
The following drivers and teams contested the 1991 British Formula 3000 Championship.

Team	Chassis	Engine	No.	Driver	Rounds
(United Kingdom) Mansell Madgwick Motorsport	Reynard	Cosworth	1	(United Kingdom) Paul Warwick	1-5
(United Kingdom) Mansell Madgwick Motorsport	Reynard	Mugen	2	(Brazil) Marco Greco	All
(United Kingdom) Mansell Madgwick Motorsport	Reynard	Cosworth	18	(Norway) Harald Huysman	1-2
(United Kingdom) Mansell Madgwick Motorsport	Reynard	Cosworth	18	(Mexico) Carlos Guerrero	3
(United Kingdom) Mansell Madgwick Motorsport	Reynard	Cosworth	18	(United Kingdom) Chris Goodwin	4
(United Kingdom) Mansell Madgwick Motorsport	Reynard	Cosworth	18	(United Kingdom) Jason Elliot	8-11
(United Kingdom) GJ - Bromley Motorsport	Reynard	Cosworth	3	(Italy) Giovanna Amati	1-2
(United Kingdom) GJ - Bromley Motorsport	Reynard	Cosworth	3	(United Kingdom) Chris Goodwin	3
(United Kingdom) GJ - Bromley Motorsport	Reynard	Cosworth	3	(United Kingdom) Dave Coyne	4-11
(United Kingdom) GJ - Bromley Motorsport	Reynard	Cosworth	5	(Belgium) Alain Plasch	1-4, 7-11
(United Kingdom) GJ - Bromley Motorsport	Reynard	Cosworth	9	(United Kingdom) Chris Goodwin	8-9
(United Kingdom) Team AJS	Lola	Cosworth	4	(Sweden) Fredrik Ekblom	All
(United Kingdom) McNeil Engineering	Lola	Cosworth	6	(Canada) Robbie Stirling	1–4, 6
(United Kingdom) McNeil Engineering	Reynard	Cosworth	6	(Canada) Robbie Stirling	5
(United Kingdom) McNeil Engineering	Reynard	Cosworth	6	(United Kingdom) Eugene O'Brien	7-11
(United Kingdom) McNeil Engineering	Lola	Cosworth	15	(Austria) Mercedes Stermitz	5
(United Kingdom) CaneCordy Motorsport	Lola	Cosworth	7	(United Kingdom) Julian Westwood	All
(United Kingdom) Omegaland	Reynard	Cosworth	10	(France) Jérôme Policand	All
(United Kingdom) Omegaland	Reynard	Cosworth	16	(United Kingdom) Mark Newman	2-3
(United Kingdom) Omegaland	Reynard	Cosworth	16	(United Kingdom) David Button	4
(United Kingdom) Superpower Engineering System	Lola	Cosworth	11	(United Kingdom) Phil Andrews	All
(United Kingdom) Superpower Engineering System	Lola	Cosworth	12	(United Kingdom) Richard Dean	All
(United Kingdom) GA Motorsport	Reynard	Cosworth	14	(Italy) Amato Ferrari	1-3
(United Kingdom) GA Motorsport	Reynard	Cosworth	15	(France) Thierry Delubac	1
(United Kingdom) GA Motorsport	Reynard	Cosworth	15	(United Kingdom) Perry McCarthy	3
(France) Oreca	Reynard	Cosworth	17	(France) Frederic Gosparini	All
(United Kingdom) GP Motorsport	Leyton House	Cosworth	19	(United Kingdom) David Button	2
(Italy) Berkeley Team London	Reynard	Cosworth	20	(Italy) Raineri Randaccio	2, 4-5, 8, 11
(Italy) Berkeley Team London	Reynard	Cosworth	20	(Italy) Mirko Savoldi	6-7, 10
(Italy) Terrapol Durango	Reynard	Cosworth	21	(Italy) Massimo "Gimax Jnr" Franchi	1-3
(Italy) Terrapol Durango	Lola	Cosworth	21	(Italy) Massimo "Gimax Jnr" Franchi	4-5
(Italy) Terrapol Durango	Lola	Cosworth	21	(Italy) Guido Basile	6, 8-11
(Italy) Terrapol Durango	Lola	Cosworth	22	(Italy) Luigi Giorgio	1-8
(Italy) Terrapol Durango	Lola	Cosworth	22	(Italy) Marco Spiga	11
(United Kingdom) CoBRa Motorsport	Reynard	Cosworth	23	(United Kingdom) Tim Sugden	2
(United Kingdom) CoBRa Motorsport	Reynard	Cosworth	23	(Norway) Harald Huysman	3-4
(United Kingdom) CoBRa Motorsport	Reynard	Cosworth	23	(Argentina) José Luis Di Palma	5-8, 10-11
(United Kingdom) CoBRa Motorsport	Reynard	Cosworth	25	(Norway) Harald Huysman	5
(United Kingdom) CoBRa Motorsport	Reynard	Cosworth	25	(Italy) Massimo "Gimax Jnr" Franchi	6-10
(United Kingdom) CoBRa Motorsport	Reynard	Cosworth	25	(United Kingdom) Steve Bottoms	11
(Sweden) JR Motorsport	Reynard	Cosworth	24	(Sweden) Johan Raijamäki	4–7, 10
(United Kingdom) Landrige Motorsports	Reynard	Cosworth	26	(United Kingdom) Mark Newman	4-6, 10
(United Kingdom) Landrige Motorsports	Reynard	Cosworth	26	(Italy) Paolo di Cristoforo	9
(United Kingdom) Landrige Motorsports	Reynard	Cosworth	28	(Sweden) Kenny Bräck	5
(United Kingdom) Landrige Motorsports	Reynard	Cosworth	28	(United Kingdom) Gary Ayles	6, 9
(United Kingdom) Landrige Motorsports	Reynard	Cosworth	28	(Italy) Luigi Giorgio	10
(United Kingdom) Landrige Motorsports	Reynard	Cosworth	28	(France) Laurent Daument	11
(United Kingdom) Phoenix 3000 Team	Reynard	Cosworth	27	(Sweden) Peter Olsson	6-11

== Results ==
=== British Formula 3000 Championship ===
Round	Date	Circuit	Pole position	Fastest lap	Winning driver	Winning team
1	March 23	(United Kingdom) Oulton Park	(United Kingdom) Paul Warwick	(United Kingdom) Paul Warwick	(United Kingdom) Paul Warwick	(United Kingdom) Mansell Madgwick Motorsport
2	April 28	(United Kingdom) Donington Park	(United Kingdom) Paul Warwick	(United Kingdom) Phil Andrews	(United Kingdom) Paul Warwick	(United Kingdom) Mansell Madgwick Motorsport
3	May 12	(United Kingdom) Brands Hatch (Indy)	(United Kingdom) Paul Warwick	(United Kingdom) Paul Warwick	(United Kingdom) Paul Warwick	(United Kingdom) Mansell Madgwick Motorsport
4	June 30	(United Kingdom) Brands Hatch (Indy)	(United Kingdom) Paul Warwick	(United Kingdom) Paul Warwick	(United Kingdom) Paul Warwick	(United Kingdom) Mansell Madgwick Motorsport
5	July 21	(United Kingdom) Oulton Park	(United Kingdom) Paul Warwick	(United Kingdom) Paul Warwick	(United Kingdom) Paul Warwick	(United Kingdom) Mansell Madgwick Motorsport
6	August 4	(United Kingdom) Snetterton	(United Kingdom) Phil Andrews	(United Kingdom) Dave Coyne	(United Kingdom) Dave Coyne	(United Kingdom) GJ - Bromley Motorsport
7	August 11	(United Kingdom) Thruxton	(United Kingdom) Julian Westwood	(United Kingdom) Dave Coyne	(United Kingdom) Dave Coyne	(United Kingdom) GJ - Bromley Motorsport
8	September 1	(United Kingdom) Donington Park	(Sweden) Fredrik Ekblom	(Sweden) Fredrik Ekblom	(Sweden) Fredrik Ekblom	(United Kingdom) Team AJS
9	September 8	(United Kingdom) Brands Hatch (GP)	(United Kingdom) Phil Andrews	(Sweden) Fredrik Ekblom	(Sweden) Fredrik Ekblom	(United Kingdom) Team AJS
10	September 22	(United Kingdom) Silverstone (National)	(United Kingdom) Jason Elliott	(United Kingdom) Jason Elliott	(Sweden) Fredrik Ekblom	(United Kingdom) Team AJS
11	October 13	(United Kingdom) Donington Park	(United Kingdom) Julian Westwood	(United Kingdom) Julian Westwood	(United Kingdom) Julian Westwood	(United Kingdom) CaneCordy Motorsport

== Championship Standings ==
Pos.	Driver	OUL	DON	BHI	BHI	OUL	SNE	THR	DON	BGP	SIL	DON	Points
1	(United Kingdom) Paul Warwick	1	1	1	1	1							45
2	(Sweden) Fredrik Ekblom	7	4	5	4	4	Ret	6	1	1	1	4	42
3	(United Kingdom) Julian Westwood	2	3	2	Ret	7	Ret	2	2	5	5	1	41
4	(United Kingdom) Richard Dean	Ret	5	3	3	2	2	Ret	Ret	2	3	Ret	32
5	(United Kingdom) Dave Coyne				2	6	1	1	8	Ret	Ret	9	25
6	(United Kingdom) Phil Andrews	6	2	13	Ret	3	Ret	4	Ret	4	7	3	21
7	(France) Jérôme Policand	Ret	7	4	Ret	Ret	3	3	4	Ret	4	5	19
8	(United Kingdom) Jason Elliott								Ret	3	2	2	16
9	(Brazil) Marco Greco	Ret	6	Ret	Ret	5	5	5	3	Ret	8	10	11
10	(Italy) Massimo Franchi	3	13	Ret	6	11	6	Ret	Ret	6	Ret		7
11	(Argentina) José Luis Di Palma					12	4	9	10	Ret	6	6	5
12	(France) Frederic Gosparini	Ret	8	8	5	8	8	8	5	7	Ret	Ret	4
13	(Norway) Harald Huysman	4	DNS	7	Ret	10							3
14	(Belgium) Alain Plasch	5	10	6	Ret			Ret	Ret	DNS	10	Ret	3
15	(United Kingdom) Eugene O'Brien							7	6	8	Ret	8	1
16	(Sweden) Peter Olsson						Ret	10	7	Ret	9	7	0
17	(Italy) Luigi Giorgio	Ret	11	11	Ret	DNS	7	Ret	Ret		Ret		0
18	(Canada) Robbie Stirling	8	Ret	9	Ret	13	Ret						0
19	(Italy) Raineri Randaccio		Ret		Ret	15			9			12	0
20	(Italy) Giovanna Amati	9	Ret										0
21	(United Kingdom) Tim Sugden		9										0
22	(Sweden) Kenny Bräck					9							0
23	(Italy) Amato Ferrari	Ret	Ret	10									0
24	(Sweden) Johan Raijamäki				NC	Ret	Ret	11			11		0
25	(United Kingdom) Steve Bottoms											11	0
26	(United Kingdom) David Button		12		Ret								0
27	(Mexico) Carlos Guerrero			12									0
28	(Italy) Guido Basile						Ret		Ret			13	0
29	(United Kingdom) Mark Newman		Ret	15	Ret	14	DNS				Ret		0
30	(United Kingdom) Chris Goodwin			14	Ret				Ret	Ret			0
31	(Italy) Marco Spiga											14	0
	(Italy) Mirko Savoldi						Ret	Ret			Ret		
	(United Kingdom) Gary Ayles						Ret			Ret			
	(Austria) Mercedes Stermitz					Ret							
	(Italy) Paolo di Cristoforo									Ret			
	(France) Laurent Daument											Ret	
	(United Kingdom) Perry McCarthy			DNS									
