= Akbar Ebrahim =

Indian racing driver

President of Federation of Motor Sports Clubs of India
- In office 2020–2024
- Succeeded by: Arindam Ghosh

Akbar Ebrahim (born on 14 December 1963) is an Indian former racing driver. He was the first Indian to contest Formula Two and compete abroad. He served as the President of the Federation of Motor Sports Clubs of India for three terms. He is also the president of the International Karting Commission, the CIK of FIA from February 2022.

In 1988, Karivardhan, considered as one of the stalwarts of Indian Motorsports, built the first Indian Formula car, with a Maruti 800cc engine and the inaugural race was won by Akbar Ebrahim. Later, the championship was named as FISSME, Formula India Single Seater Maruti Engine. The first FISSME race was held at Sholavaram and the next year in 1989, Jackie Stewart laid the foundation for the racing track at Irungattukottai, which is presently known as Madras International Circuit.

Ebrahim also claims to have mentored the first Formula One driver from India, Narain Karthikeyan.

== Career ==
After his schooling in Don Bosco Matriculation in Chennai, Ebrahim finished his Commerce graduation from the Loyola College, Chennai. He is a professional cricket player and represented Tamil Nadu in the Ranji Trophy. He is also a car racer who took part in open-wheel Formula racing.

Ebrahim was the first Indian to take part in the British F2 races. He took part in the 1994 British Formula Two Championship and also participated in the 1996 British Formula Three Championship. In a Dallara F398-Mugen Honda he took part in the MRF Madras Formula 3 Grand Prix and got a podium. He went on to drive a SMR AF2000-Ford Zetec shod on Michelin tyres in the Formula 2000 Asia Championship in 2000 for the FRD team. In the 2004 Formula LGB Swift Championship he took part as a part of the Super Speeds team, the famous outfit of Karivardhan, in a Maruti Esteem. He was also a popular rally driver and made a comeback taking part in the 2018 Indian National Rally Championship at Coimbatore after 25 years.

Akbar Ebrahim was first elected as the President of the FMSCI in 2016. Ebrahim was elected as the President at the 43rd Annual General Meeting of the club, when he replaced Zayn Khan, who has been leading FMSCI since September 2015, after the death of Bharat Raj, the then president. He served another two terms from September 2020.
