= 1995 Belgian Procar Championship =

Seasons
- ← 1994 1996 →

The 1995 Belgian Procar Championship was won by Thierry Tassin driving a BMW 318iS for the BMW Fina Bastos Team. The manufacturers' trophy was won by BMW.

== Teams and drivers ==
Team	Car	No.	Drivers	Round
(Belgium) BMW Fina Bastos Team	BMW 318iS	1	(Belgium) Marc Duez (Italy) Roberto Ravaglia (Brazil) Nelson Piquet	5
(Belgium) BMW Fina Bastos Team	BMW 318iS	5	(Belgium) Marc Duez	1-4, 6-8
(Belgium) BMW Fina Bastos Team	BMW 318iS	7	(Belgium) Thierry Tassin	1-4, 6-8
(Belgium) BMW Fina Bastos Team	BMW 318iS	7	(Spain) Antonio Albacete (Germany) Jörg Müller (Belgium) Thierry Tassin	5
(Belgium) BMW Fina Bastos Team	BMW 318iS	8	(Netherlands) Peter Kox (United Kingdom) Steve Soper (Germany) Joachim Winkelhock	5
(Belgium) BMW Fina Bastos Team	BMW 318iS	9	(Germany) Alex Burgstaller (Brazil) Ingo Hoffman (France) Yvan Muller	5
(Belgium) Belgian VW Audi Club	Audi 80 Quattro	2	(Belgium) Philippe Adams	1-4, 7-8
(Belgium) Belgian VW Audi Club	Audi A4 Quattro	2	(Belgium) Philippe Adams	6
(Belgium) Belgian VW Audi Club	Audi 80 Quattro	3	(Belgium) Vincent Vosse	1-4, 6-8
(Belgium) Belgian VW Audi Club	Audi 80 Quattro	2	(Belgium) Philippe Adams (Belgium) Vincent Vosse (South Africa) Terry Moss	5
(Belgium) Belgian VW Audi Club	Audi 80 Quattro	3	(Belgium) Georges Cremer (Belgium) Wolfgang Haugg (Germany) Christian Abt	5
Opel Team Belgium	Opel Vectra GT	4	(Belgium) Pierre Alain Thibaut (Belgium) Eric Van de Poele (Belgium) Jean Francois Hemroulle	5
Opel Team Belgium	Opel Vectra GT	11	(Belgium) Pierre Alain Thibaut	1-4, 6-8
(Belgium) Honda Team Vzm	Honda Accord	6	(France) Bertrand Gachot (Belgium) Didier de Radigues	
(Belgium) Honda Team Vzm	Honda Accord	6	(Belgium) Patrick Snijers (Belgium) Didier de Radigues	5
(Belgium) Peugeot Talbot Belgique	Peugeot 405 Mi16	20	(Belgium) Philip Verellen	1-4, 6-8
(Belgium) Peugeot Talbot Belgique	Peugeot 405 Mi16	21	(Belgium) Eric Bachelart	1-4, 6-8

== Race calendar and results ==
Round		Circuit	Date	Pole position	Fastest lap	Winning driver	Winning team
1	R1	(Belgium) Zolder	23 Apr	(Belgium) Philippe Adams	(Belgium) Marc Duez	(Belgium) Thierry Tassin	(Belgium) BMW Fina Bastos Team
1	R2	(Belgium) Zolder	23 Apr		(Belgium) Philippe Adams	(Belgium) Pierre Alain Thibaut	Opel Team Belgium
2	R1	(Belgium) Spa-Francorchamps	7 May	(Belgium) Thierry Tassin	(Belgium) Marc Duez	(Belgium) Thierry Tassin	(Belgium) BMW Fina Bastos Team
2	R2	(Belgium) Spa-Francorchamps	7 May		(Belgium) Thierry Tassin	(Belgium) Thierry Tassin	(Belgium) BMW Fina Bastos Team
3	R1	(Belgium) Zolder	4 Jun	(Belgium) Marc Duez	(Belgium) Didier de Radigues	(Belgium) Thierry Tassin	(Belgium) BMW Fina Bastos Team
3	R2	(Belgium) Zolder	4 Jun		(Belgium) Philippe Adams	(Belgium) Thierry Tassin	(Belgium) BMW Fina Bastos Team
4	R1	(Belgium) Spa-Francorchamps	2 Jul	(Belgium) Pierre Alain Thibaut	(Belgium) Pierre Alain Thibaut	(Belgium) Thierry Tassin	(Belgium) BMW Fina Bastos Team
4	R2	(Belgium) Spa-Francorchamps	2 Jul			*Race Cancelled	
5	R1	(Belgium) 24 Hours of Spa	29/30 Jul	(Germany) Alex Burgstaller	(Italy) Roberto Ravaglia	(Germany) Joachim Winkelhock (United Kingdom) Steve Soper (Netherlands) Peter Kox	(Germany) BMW Team Schnitzer
6	R1	(Belgium) Spa-Francorchamps	26 Aug	(Belgium) Marc Duez	(Belgium) Marc Duez	(Belgium) Marc Duez	(Belgium) BMW Fina Bastos Team
6	R2	(Belgium) Spa-Francorchamps	26 Aug		(Belgium) Thierry Tassin	(Belgium) Marc Duez	(Belgium) BMW Fina Bastos Team
7	R1	(Luxembourg) Colmar-Berg	10 Sep	(Belgium) Philippe Adams	(Belgium) Philippe Adams	(Belgium) Philippe Adams	(Belgium) Belgian VW Audi Club
7	R2	(Luxembourg) Colmar-Berg	10 Sep		(Belgium) Philippe Adams	(Belgium) Philippe Adams	(Belgium) Belgian VW Audi Club
8	R1	(Belgium) Zolder	23 Sep	(Belgium) Philippe Adams	(Belgium) Philippe Adams	(Belgium) Philippe Adams	(Belgium) Belgian VW Audi Club
8	R2	(Belgium) Zolder	23 Sep		(Belgium) Philippe Adams	(Belgium) Philippe Adams	(Belgium) Belgian VW Audi Club

== Championship standings ==
Points system
1st	2nd	3rd	4th	5th	6th
10	6	4	3	2	1

=== Drivers' Championship ===
Pos	Driver	ZOL (Belgium)		SPA (Belgium)		ZOL (Belgium)		SPA (Belgium)	SPA (Belgium)	SPA (Belgium)		COL (Luxembourg)		ZOL (Belgium)		Pts
1	(Belgium) Thierry Tassin	1	3	1	1	1	1	1	Ret	2	2	2	2	2	3	98
2	(Belgium) Marc Duez	5	2	2	3	4	4	2	1	1	1	3	3	3	Ret	72
3	(Belgium) Philippe Adams	Ret	16	4	6	3	3	3	4	4	3	1	1	1	1	66
4	(Belgium) Eric Bachelart	3	4	3	2	2	2	5	Ret	3	4	6	5	4	6	45
5	(Belgium) Didier de Radigues	4	5		5		5	4	2	5	5	4	4	5	2	36
6	(Belgium) Pierre Alain Thibaut	2	1	Ret	4			Ret	Ret							19
7	(Belgium) Vincent Vosse	DNS	DNS	6	7	Ret	6	Ret	4	7	6	5	6	6	4	13
8	(Belgium) Philip Verellen	6	6	5	Ret	5	11	6	6	7	7	Ret	Ret	10	5	10
9	(Belgium) Patrick Snijers								2							6
10	(Belgium) Wolfgang Haugg								3							4
10	(Belgium) Georges Cremer								3							4

=== Manufacturers' Trophy ===
Pos	Manufacturer	Points
1	(Germany) BMW	148
2	(Germany) Audi	79
3	(Japan) Honda	54
4	(France) Peugeot	45
5	(Germany) Opel	19

== Sources ==
- Touring Car World 95/96 — The official book of Touring car
