= 1994 British Formula Two Championship =

The 1994 British Formula Two Championship was the sixth season of the British Formula 3000 Championship. José Luis Di Palma won the championship, driving a Reynard 92D for Madgwick International. Both the Argentinian and series runner-up Phil Andrews (Apache Racing) won two rounds apiece. However, the grids were weak and British F2 was in decline. International F3000 drivers Gareth Rees and Christian Pescatori both won one-off races with Durango, at Snetterton and Donington respectively. Future Indy Lights star Philipp Peter also had a single race with the Italian team. Rees' future team-mate Stephen Watson made a single appearance in the series. The Moosehead Grand Prix at Halifax, Canada, a non-championship F3000 race in 1993, counted as a British F2 round in 1994 and was won by the Italian-Mexican Gianfranco Cané, driving for Fred Goddard Racing.

It was very sad that this season gave sequence to the continuous downward spiral for this series, with fields sometimes having as few as six entries only, and three scheduled races cancelled due to aforementioned lack of entries.

== Drivers and teams ==
The following drivers and teams contested the 1994 British Formula Two Championship.

| Team | Chassis | Engine | No. | Driver | Rounds |
|---|---|---|---|---|---|
| (United Kingdom) Madgwick International | Reynard | Cosworth | 1 | (Argentina) José Luis Di Palma | All |
| (United Kingdom) Apache Racing | Reynard | Cosworth | 4 | (United Kingdom) Dominic Chappell | All |
| (United Kingdom) Apache Racing | Reynard | Cosworth | 5 | (United Kingdom) Phil Andrews | All |
| (United Kingdom) AIM Motorsport | Reynard | Mugen | 6 | (Greece) Andreas Halkiopoulos | 1–2, 4-7 |
| (United Kingdom) McNeil Engineering | Lola | Judd | 7 | (Canada) Robbie Stirling | 1–3, 5-7 |
| (United Kingdom) Rex Hart Racing | Reynard | Cosworth | 8 | (United Kingdom) David Mercer | 3, 5, 7 |
| (United Kingdom) Weylock Racing | Reynard | Cosworth | 9 | (Sweden) Nicke Blom | 1 |
| (United Kingdom) Weylock Racing | Reynard | Cosworth | 9 | (France) Franck Fréon | 4 |
| (United Kingdom) Fred Goddard Racing | Reynard | Cosworth | 10 | (Finland) Pekka Herva | 2–3, 5 |
| (United Kingdom) Fred Goddard Racing | Reynard | Cosworth | 10 | (Mexico) Gianfranco Cané | 4 |
| (United Kingdom) Worswick Engineering | Reynard | Cosworth | 11 | (United Kingdom) Tony Worswick | 3 |
| (United Kingdom) Cobra Motorsport | Reynard | Cosworth | 12 | (United Kingdom) Richard Dean | 4 |
| (Germany) Monninghoff Sport Promotion | Reynard | Cosworth | 14 | (Germany) Klaus Panchyrz | 4 |
| (Germany) Monninghoff Sport Promotion | Reynard | Cosworth | 15 | (United Kingdom) James Taylor | 4 |
| (Netherlands) Vortex Motorsport | Reynard | Cosworth | 18 | (Netherlands) Allard Kalff | 6 |
| (Netherlands) Vortex Motorsport | Reynard | Cosworth | 18 | (Denmark) Kris Nissen | 7 |
| (Netherlands) Vortex Motorsport | Reynard | Cosworth | 19 | (Germany) Hans Fertl | 6 |
| (United Kingdom) Omegaland | Lola | Cosworth | 20 | (South Africa) Stephen Watson | 7 |
| (Italy) Durango Corse | Reynard | Cosworth | 30 | (United Kingdom) Gareth Rees | 6 |
| (Italy) Durango Corse | Reynard | Cosworth | 30 | (Italy) Christian Pescatori | 7 |
| (Italy) Durango Corse | Reynard | Cosworth | 31 | (Italy) Luca Riccitelli | 6 |
| (Italy) Durango Corse | Reynard | Cosworth | 31 | (Austria) Philipp Peter | 7 |
| (Italy) Durango Corse | Reynard | Cosworth | 32 | (Italy) Vito Popolizio | 6-7 |

== Results ==
=== British Formula Two Championship ===
| Round | Date | Circuit | Pole position | Fastest lap | Winning driver | Winning team |
|---|---|---|---|---|---|---|
| C | April 1 | (United Kingdom) Oulton Park | Cancelled due to lack of entries | | | |
| C | May 2 | (United Kingdom) Thruxton | Cancelled due to lack of entries | | | |
| 1 | May 30 | (United Kingdom) Brands Hatch (Indy) | (Argentina) José Luis Di Palma | (Canada) Robbie Stirling | (United Kingdom) Phil Andrews | (United Kingdom) Apache Racing |
| 2 | June 4 | (United Kingdom) Silverstone (National) | (United Kingdom) Phil Andrews | (Finland) Pekka Herva | (Argentina) José Luis Di Palma | (United Kingdom) Madgwick International |
| 3 | June 11 | (United Kingdom) Oulton Park | (United Kingdom) Phil Andrews | (United Kingdom) Phil Andrews | (United Kingdom) Phil Andrews | (United Kingdom) Apache Racing |
| 4 | July 10 | (Canada) Halifax | (France) Franck Fréon | (France) Franck Fréon | (Mexico) Gianfranco Cane | (United Kingdom) Fred Goddard Racing |
| 5 | August 7 | (United Kingdom) Snetterton | (Argentina) José Luis Di Palma | (Argentina) José Luis Di Palma | (Argentina) José Luis Di Palma | (United Kingdom) Madgwick International |
| C | September 18 | (United Kingdom) Brands Hatch (GP) | Cancelled due to lack of entries | | | |
| 6 | October 16 | (United Kingdom) Snetterton | (United Kingdom) Gareth Rees | (United Kingdom) Gareth Rees | (United Kingdom) Gareth Rees | (Italy) Durango Corse |
| 7 | October 30 | (United Kingdom) Donington Park | (Italy) Christian Pescatori | (United Kingdom) Phil Andrews | (Italy) Christian Pescatori | (Italy) Durango Corse |

== Championship Standings ==
| Pos. | Driver | (United Kingdom) BHI | (United Kingdom) SIL | (United Kingdom) OUL | (Canada) HAL | (United Kingdom) SNE | (United Kingdom) SNE | (United Kingdom) DON | Points |
|---|---|---|---|---|---|---|---|---|---|
| 1 | (Argentina) José Luis Di Palma | Ret | 1 | 2 | 3 | 1 | 4 | 4 | 34 |
| 2 | (United Kingdom) Phil Andrews | 1 | 2 | 1 | DNS | 2 | DNS | Ret | 30 |
| 3 | (United Kingdom) Dominic Chappell | 2 | Ret | 3 | 4 | 4 | 2 | Ret | 22 |
| 4 | (Canada) Robbie Stirling | DSQ | Ret | 4 | | 3 | 3 | 5 | 13 |
| 5 | (Mexico) Gianfranco Cane | | | | 1 | | | | 9 |
| 6 | (United Kingdom) Gareth Rees | | | | | | 1 | | 9 |
| 7 | (Italy) Christian Pescatori | | | | | | | 1 | 9 |
| 8 | (Greece) Andreas Halkiopoulos | 3 | 4 | | 6 | NC | Ret | Ret | 8 |
| 9 | (Germany) Klaus Panchyrz | | | | 2 | | | | 6 |
| 10 | (Austria) Philipp Peter | | | | | | | 2 | 6 |
| 11 | (Finland) Pekka Herva | | 3 | DNS | | Ret | | | 4 |
| 12 | (Denmark) Kris Nissen | | | | | | | 3 | 4 |
| 13 | (United Kingdom) David Mercer | | | 5 | | 5 | | 9 | 4 |
| 14 | (United Kingdom) James Taylor | | | | 5 | | | | 2 |
| 15 | (Italy) Luca Riccitelli | | | | | | 5 | | 2 |
| 16 | (South Africa) Stephen Watson | | | | | | | 6 | 1 |
| 17 | (Italy) Vito Popolizio | | | | | | 6 | 7 | 1 |
| 18 | (India) Akbar Ebrahim | | | | | | | 8 | 0 |
| | (United Kingdom) Tony Worswick | | | Ret | | | | | |
| | (France) Franck Fréon | | | | Ret | | | | |
| | (United Kingdom) Richard Dean | | | | Ret | | | | |
| | (Germany) Hans Fertl | | | | | | Ret | | |
| | (United Kingdom) Steve Arnold | | | | | | | Ret | |
| | (Sweden) Nicke Blom | DNS | | | | | | | |
