= Texas World Speedway =

Former motorsport track in the United States

- Oval (1969–2017)
- Location: 17529 Highway 6 South; College Station, Texas, United States; 77845
- Coordinates: 30°32′13″N 96°13′16″W
- Capacity: 26,000
- Owner: Corps Ventures (2007–2017)
- Broke ground: March 20, 1969; 57 years ago
- Opened: November 9, 1969; 56 years ago
- Closed: September 2017; 9 years ago
- Former names: Texas International Speedway (1969–1971)
- Major events: Former: Ferrari Challenge North America (1994–1998, 2003); IMSA GT Championship (1971, 1995–1996); NASCAR Cup Series; Budweiser NASCAR 400 (1969, 1971–1973, 1979–1981); AMA Superbike Championship (1991–1992); Trans-Am Series (1991); Can-Am (1969)
- Website: texasworldspeedway.com Archived September 29, 2017, at the Wayback Machine

Oval (1969–2017)
- Surface: Asphalt
- Length: 2.000 mi (3.219 km)
- Turns: 4
- Banking: Turns: 22° Frontstretch: 12° Backstretch: 2°

Long Road Course (1969–2017)
- Length: 2.900 mi (4.667 km)
- Turns: 15
- Race lap record: 1:33.900 ( (New Zealand) Denny Hulme, McLaren M8B, 1969, Can-Am)

Short Road Course (1969–2017)
- Length: 1.900 mi (3.058 km)
- Turns: 8
- Race lap record: 0:55.948 ( (Italy) Max Papis, Ferrari 333 SP, 1996, WSC)

Infield Road Course (1969–2017)
- Length: 1.800 mi (2.897 km)
- Turns: 11
- Race lap record: 1:20.450 ( (United States) Peter Gregg, Porsche 911 S, 1972, GTU)

Texas World Speedway (formerly known as the Texas International Speedway from 1969 to 1971) was an auto racing complex in College Station, Texas, United States. The complex featured multiple layouts, including a 2.000 mi (3.219 km) oval and various road course layouts. From its opening in 1969 until its closure in 2017, the facility hosted numerous major racing events, including NASCAR, IMSA GT Championship, and United States Auto Club (USAC) events. The track since its closure has been demolished, with a majority of the track site now replaced by a residential housing development known as Southern Pointe.

The facility was built in 1969 under the financial backing of American Raceways, Inc. founder Lawrence LoPatin. After American Raceways experienced severe financial troubles soon after the track's completion, the track was sold in 1971 to Daniel W. Holloway. Holloway also experienced financial issues, leading to a two-year closure starting in 1974. In 1976, Dick Conole bought the facility, reopening it and running some major events for the first years of his tenure. However, after becoming disgruntled with the state of major racing series, by 1982, Conole only ran independently-run major races. By the end of the decade, Conole also fell into financial trouble, selling the track to Japanese company Ishin Development in 1990, who made some renovations. After the company missed numerous payments to various parties, Ishin Development declared bankruptcy in 1993 and the facility was sold back to Conole in 1994.

After Conole's death in 2007, Corps Ventures, led by Bill Mather, acquired the facility within the year. Plans to demolish the track for a mixed-use development plan were announced in 2014, with work set to begin the following year. However, after multiple delays, the track was closed in late 2017, with work beginning the following year. As of 2024, more than half of the track site has been replaced.

== Description ==
=== Layouts and configuration ===
Texas World Speedway (TWS) was designed by Charles Moneypenny and featured numerous layouts. There were two oval layouts: a 2.000 mi (3.219 km) oval and a 1.500 mi (2.414 km) oval. The 2.000 mi (3.219 km) oval was banked at 22° in the turns, 12° on the track's frontstretch, and 2° on the track's backstretch. The 1.500 mi (2.414 km) oval was flat. In addition, TWS featured various road course layouts of varying lengths.

=== Amenities ===
TWS was located in College Station, Texas, and served by Texas State Highway 6. A main grandstand was erected on the track's frontstretch; according to a 1969 report, the grandstand had a seating capacity of 26,000.

== Track history ==
=== Planning and construction ===
On January 23, 1969, Dennis Goehring, president of the Bank of A&M, announced the construction of a 2.000 mi (3.219 km) auto racing oval within the city of College Station, Texas, named as the "Texas International Raceway". At the time of the announcement, the proposed $6,000,000 (adjusted for inflation, $52,676,951) facility planned for a capacity of 30,000, with hopes to host Indy-car racing, stock car racing, and sports car racing. The main financier of the facility was later revealed to be Lawrence LoPatin, owner of the Michigan International Speedway (MIS), with plans to build the Texas International Raceway track similar to MIS. Further plans were revealed on the 28th, which included the construction of the aforementioned oval and three road course layouts, plans to build the track near Texas State Highway 6, and a formal opening date of December 7 to host a NASCAR Grand National Series (now known as the NASCAR Cup Series) event. Track designer Charles Moneypenny later announced design plans to bank the turns of the track at 25° and the frontstretch at 12°. Before the track's groundbreaking, a designated group from the Chamber of Commerce from the cities of Bryan and College Station were sent to the 1969 Daytona 500 at the Daytona International Speedway on a "fact-finding tour" on the potential community impacts of building a racetrack.

Groundbreaking on the facility occurred on March 20, with dignitaries attending including Lawrence LoPatin, then-Texas A&M University president James Earl Rudder, then-Speaker of the Texas House of Representatives Gus Franklin Mutscher, and NASCAR president Bill France Sr. The formal opening date was later moved up to November 9 after the scheduling of a Can–Am event at the facility. Before construction, issues occurred after the College Station City Council stated that water line extensions for the facility were not feasible due to a lack of practicality; as a result, a well system was created. Two months later, the council approved building a plastic pipe to the well from the city's water tower. In addition, track officials stated hopes of expanding portions of State Highway 6 near the facility to an eight-lane highway, but necessary funds to expand the road were not available for at least six months. Track officials were able to instead expand the nearby Peach Creek Road to four lanes, with the road serving as an entrance for spectators. By mid-June, track general manager Leo Margolian stated that "the oval is starting to take shape, and we'll start working on the road course next week". In July, College Station city commissioners approved the extension of the city's electricity system to the track. Paving for the facility began in August.

=== Early years ===
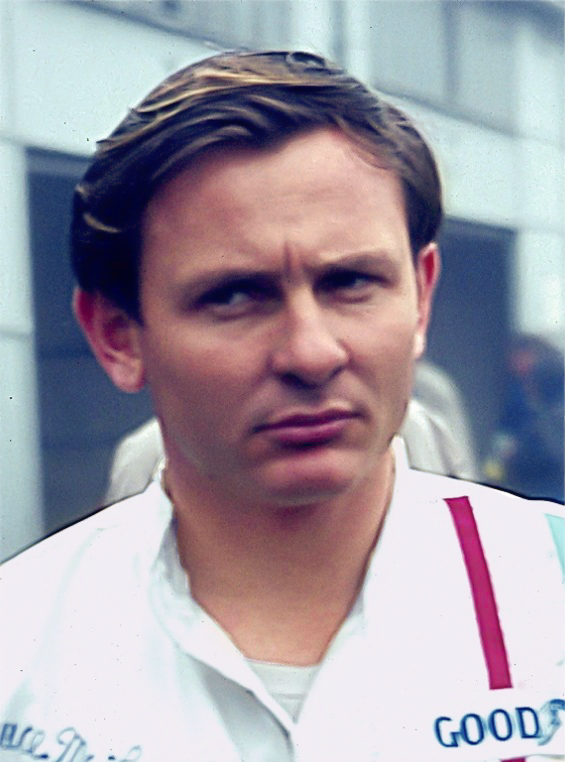
Bruce McLaren (pictured in 1966) won the first major race at the then-named Texas International Speedway on November 9, 1969, in a Can–Am event.

After being delayed by a week due to rain, the first events ran at the facility occurred on October 19 for a Sports Car Club of America (SCCA) event meant as a "shakedown" for the facility; Cecil B. Harriss won the first race staged at the track. The Can–Am event, the first event open to spectators, ran as scheduled on the track's road course, with Bruce McLaren winning the event in front of a reported crowd of 24,260 according to The Bryan-College Station Eagle. This figure is disputed in a 1982 Eagle report from Rhonda Hoeckley, who claimed that spectators stated the figure was too high. The first NASCAR-sanctioned race, the 1969 Texas 500, was run as scheduled, with Bobby Isaac winning the event. In February 1970, George Boyett was appointed as the general manager of the facility after Margolian was promoted to become the vice president of ARI.

==== American Raceways troubles, bankruptcy proceedings ====
During the track's infancy, LoPatin, now consolidating his company into American Raceways, Inc., (ARI) experienced major financial and organizational troubles in its ventures. The first lien against TIS was attached on January 23, 1970, and the first lawsuit was filed on February 4. In addition, the organization had multiple disputes with various sanctioning bodies, including the United States Auto Club (USAC), NASCAR, and the SCCA over numerous issues. Throughout the first half of 1970, ARI faced heavy financial troubles due to low attendance from its racetracks. LoPatin additionally faced criticism for his handling of ARI-owned Atlanta International Raceway (now known as the Atlanta Motor Speedway), with Atlanta track officials leading campaigns to sack LoPatin after several Atlanta track executives either left or were fired by him. LoPatin was fired from his position as chairman of ARI on July 30, 1970, with motorsports executive Les Richter named as the president of ARI soon after.

During this period, numerous major races were postponed and eventually cancelled for varying reasons, including Can–Am, NASCAR Cup Series, and USAC Championship Car events. In July, driver Wally Dallenbach Sr. criticized the track's safety in regards to its USAC Championship Car events, calling for the cancellation of the track's USAC Championship Car event. In response, Boyett stated that the track "was built for 190 to 200 mph speeds", shifting blame towards the aerodynamics of the open-wheeled USAC Championship car. In September, after LoPatin's firing, the facility underwent a management overhaul, with car builder Carroll Shelby replacing LoPatin for the track's control. By the following month, with ARI now in an estimated $11,000,000 (adjusted for inflation, $91,195,373) in debt, San Antonio Express-News writer Karl O'Quinn stated that "rumors are now too strong to be ignored that the real reason for the cancellation of the pair of races was the inability of TIS to post the [purse] money in advance". He further wrote that the facility was likely to be sold off to help pay off ARI's debts. In November, the Holloway Construction Company filed a foreclosure sale notice after the company was owned $525,000. After a TIS-led attempt failed to stop the sale via temporary injunction, United States District Court for the Northern District of Texas judge Joe Ewing Estes postponed the sale on November 30 until a bankruptcy petition filed by TIS was either approved or dismissed.

==== Bankruptcy reorganization failure ====
Hearings on the bankruptcy reorganization petition occurred on December 15 and 16. After a recommendation was given for the proposal's approval, reorganization under Chapter 10 bankruptcy was approved on December 29. With the approval, a foreclosure sale was cancelled and Dallas attorney Talbot Rain was appointed to manage the track. Rain was pessimistic about a successful reorganization, stating in February to the Eagle that while he was "hopeful", the chances of a successful reorganization plan were "not very encouraging". Under Rain's control, TIS scheduled local driving schools, USAC-sanctioned, and NASCAR Cup Series events; the latter two were cancelled. In April, a reorganization plan was officially submitted, with a final decision scheduled at the end of the following month. In May, another foreclosure sale was petitioned by creditors of the track. The reorganization plan was rejected by bankruptcy judge Dan Gandy on May 28. Gandy rejected the plan again on September 7, eventually ordering the track's sale to Holloway Construction. The track was purchased by the company and its owners, Daniel W. Holloway and Robert M. Andrews, under the terms that the track's debt of over $3,000,000 (adjusted for inflation, $23,849,630) was cancelled alongside a payment of $10,000 for the track's real estate.

==== Daniel W. Holloway purchase, continued struggles ====
With the track's purchase made official in October 1971, the facility was renamed to Texas World Speedway (TWS). For the track's reopening, the ownership group scheduled races on December 4–5, highlighted by IMSA GT Championship, NASCAR Late Model Sportsman Division, and NASCAR Cup Series events. The weekend was heavily affected by rain, which included the postponement of the Cup Series race to December 12. In April 1972, Meyer Speedway operator Ed Hamblen was appointed by Holloway as TWS' executive director. On October 8, 1972, the track experienced its first racing fatality during an Automobile Racing Club of America (ARCA)-sanctioned event when driver Louis Wusterhausen was involved in a crash on the first lap of the event at the track's third turn. According to the Eagle, Wusterhausen's car spun and was hit on its broadside by Cleve Smith, with Wusterhausen dying instantly from the incident. On June 11, 1973, Hamblen resigned from the track due to conflicting business interests in Houston, with Pocono Raceway public relations manager Bill Marvel appointed as Hamblen's replacement. A month later, TWS held its first drag racing events on a 1/8 mi (0.20 km)-long dragstrip.

TWS continued to experience struggles for its major races, primarily due to weather. Out of the six major races ran under Holloway's control, five races were affected due to rain. In addition, a NASCAR race scheduled for late 1973 was cancelled due to "the possibility of undesirable weather conditions". In December 1973, Holloway announced the cancellation of all motorsports event due to the 1973 oil crisis, with the cancellation being planned to last until the end of the crisis. Although the official reason given for the cancellation was complications from the crisis, the Eagle's Joe Kammlah wrote that the facility suffered financial issues due to large amounts of money being spent for the promotion of its races. The only major event held at TWS in 1974 was Willie Nelson's Fourth of July Picnic, a music festival. Throughout 1974 and 1975, the Fort Worth Star-Telegram's Bill Gay published rumors of a potential purchase of TWS, including separate offers from racing driver A. J. Foyt and a group of Houston investors.

=== Dick Conole purchase ===
On January 25, 1976, the Eagle reported rumors of potential new ownership for TWS under motorsports businessman Dick Conole. The rumor was officially confirmed on February 5, with Conole, W. Perry Gresh, and Carl B. Lehr purchasing the track from Holloway; Conole became the track's president. According to the Houston Post's David Casstevens, the purchase price for TWS was $1,500,000 (adjusted for inflation, $8,486,842). To reopen the track, the ownership group ran a USAC-sanctioned stock car race on June 6. On March 19, 1977, sports car racer Phil Carney died in a crash during a qualifying session for a Formula Ford event, spinning at the road course's sixth turn and hitting a car off-track. By 1978, Conole stated in a Fort Worth Star-Telegram interview that the track's growth in terms of fans was "building steadily". On November 8, 1980, stock car racer Ronnie Miller died in a crash during a practice session in an unsanctioned, independently-ran stock car race. According to the San Antonio Express-News, Miller was hit by another car who was attempting to avoid a car with a blown engine, with Miller flipping in the track's infield after a wheel was caught in the dirt.

==== Non-sanctioned racing era ====
By 1981, all major motorsports sanctioning bodies stopped hosting events at the track for varying reasons. Major open-wheel racing departed after 1980 due to a conflict and eventual split between USAC and Championship Auto Racing Teams (CART), and NASCAR departed in 1981 due to disputes with Conole and NASCAR, with Conole stating in the San Antonio Light that he was dissatisfied at the cost of promoting major races. Conole later stated in a 1987 promotional article for the Eagle that by only hosting independently-ran races, he could also create "better rules for races" that focused on the entertainment aspect of events. By June 1982, Conole was "disenchanted" with hosting major motorsports events; instead, he hosted a variety of non-motorsports events and independently-run motorsports events. In addition, he built two oil wells at the TWS facility to increase the track's revenue. In the following year, Houston media began marketing that year's Texas Race of Champions, an unsanctioned race which had been running annually for seven years up to that point, as the potential final motorsports event held at TWS. Although the race continued, by November 1984, Conole stated that he had spent over $40,000 in "track repairs"; by this point, the oval's surface was deteriorating and could not host major open-wheel racing. To help further increase revenue, Conole built a truck stop on track property, with proposed plans to construct a 1.5 mi (2.4 km) road course layout that used the oval track's frontstretch. After the annual Texas Race of Champions was cancelled in 1989 due to a lack of financial support, TWS was essentially left dormant for the 1990 season. San Antonio Light writer Bruce Mabrito later remarked in 1988 that "never in the history of TWS have I seen the grandstands completely full... without strong support from racing fans; no one can walk into even the most liberal-lending bank and ask for dollars to revamp and update any race facility."

In late 1988, Conole stated interest at building a horse racing track to host pari-mutuel racing after it was legalized in Brazos County in a public vote on November 8. Further plans were revealed in the following months, which included plans to demolish the turns of the oval track and convert the remaining portions of the oval to create a 1 mi (1.6 km) horse and dog racing track. According to the Express-News, the horse track could also host motorsports events. A budget was set at $5,400,000, with plans to open the facility in March 1991 and further planned expansions to include a training facility for horses and dogs. In May 1990, TWS officially filed a license to host pari-mutuel racing. However, by December, the plan was scrapped according to the Eagle.

=== Short-lived Ishin years ===
On December 8, 1990, the Houston Post's Peter C. Hubbard reported that Ishin Development, a Japanese development company that previously operated resorts in the American West Coast and Hawai‘i, signed an agreement in principle to purchase TWS at a reported price of $8-10 million. In addition, the company also planned to invest $5 million in renovations for TWS, which included the repaving of all of the track layouts, expansion of grandstands, and adding sound and television systems. Plans were made to get TWS "race-ready" by May 1991. The purchase was part of a master motorsports plan for Ishin Development, who intended to build two motorsports facilities in addition to acquiring TWS: one in Fort Worth, Texas, and another in Hawai‘i. After some delays, the purchase was made official on January 24, 1991, with track leaders initially stating hopes to reopen the facility with an IMSA GT Championship event. In the following months, track officials scheduled various events for its reopening, including an American Independence Day weekend event, an Automobile Racing Club of America (ARCA)-sanctioned event, and an AMA Superbike Championship event.

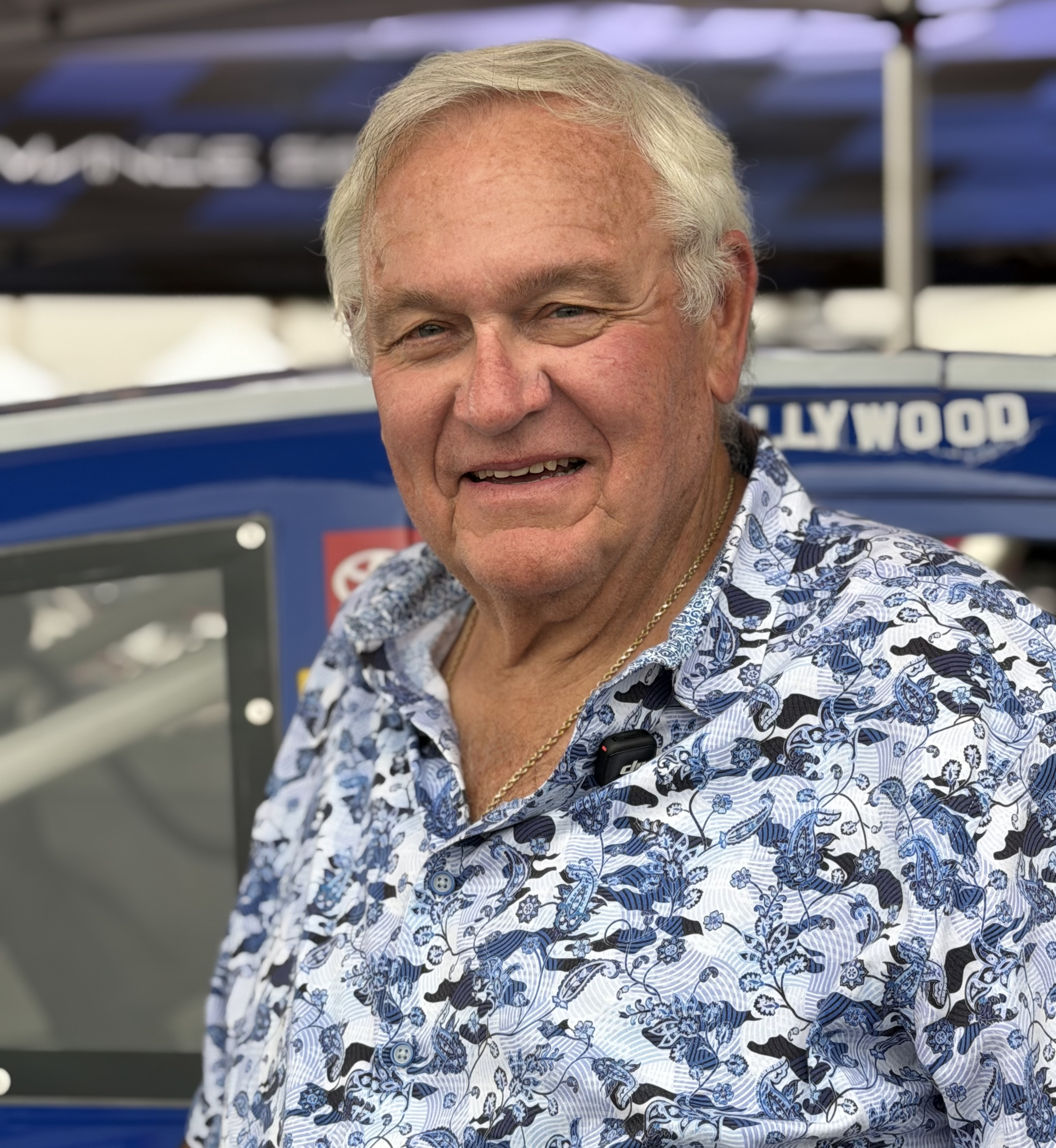
Bill Venturini (pictured in 2025) won TWS' reopening event in 1991 after the facility was acquired by Ishin Development.

Renovations for TWS began in March after some delays due to rain. By May, work began on the repaving of TWS' track layouts, with Ishin Development president Dick Respess stating plans to have all repaving done by May 25. At the end of May, track manager and director of operations Jarrett "Buddy" Boren resigned from his position, which Respress described as "a shock to me". Despite the track repave being completed, heavy rain in early June led track officials to cancel the Independence Day weekend event alongside the postponement of renovations to let the track surface properly cure. As a result of the rain, track officials decided to install a more extensive drainage system, further delaying renovations and partly causing the postponement of the now-opening AMA Superbike event from early August to early October. By mid-August, track renovations were reported to be nearly complete, with completed amenities including an expanded 40,000-seat grandstand, suites overlooking the track's pit road, and other upgraded fan amenities. Renovations ran millions of dollars over-budget; according to the company, the repave went over-budget by $1 million. The total renovation cost, according to Bruce Mabrito of the San Antonio Express-News, costed $10 million.

TWS officially reopened on September 19, 1991 for a ribbon-cutting ceremony, with the first on-track activity occurring a day later. According to the Fort Worth Star-Telegram, work on the facility was still being done as late as September 20, with blacktop being applied in the garage areas. The first race was run on the 22nd, with Bill Venturini winning an ARCA event. Soon after, TWS officials announced plans to pursue a NASCAR-sanctioned race, with hopes to host a Cup Series event.

==== Continued financial and organizational issues ====
In October, National Speed Sport News reported that "several contractors" sued Ishin Development for $325,000 for non-payment. Soon after, John Sturbin of the Star-Telegram reported that Ishin indefinitely postponed their plans to build their proposed motorsports facilities in both Fort Worth and Hawai‘i. By early December, "a dozen" liens alongside "several" lawsuits which totaled to "more than $500,000" had been filed, which potentially led to the cancellation of that month's Texas Race of Champions event according to lien holders; Respess disputed the statement. In January 1992, Respess was demoted as president of the track; according to Respess, he had previously confronted Ishin Development chairman Shigeru Hasegawa over the non-payment of bills in November, with the conversation turning "pretty confrontational". He further accused Hasegawa of "kill[ing] the messenger". In the same month, track officials announced plans to host a NASCAR Winston West Series (now known as the ARCA Racing West Series) event in March; however, NASCAR executive Ken Clapp stated that contracts were not officially signed at the time of the announcement. After progress stalled on the event, the race was eventually postponed to and ran on September 20.

By April 1992, Ishin Development chief operating officer Marvin Barsky stated that "all but a few" of the owed businesses were paid off; according to Barsky, TWS owed 161 vendors, which totaled over $2 million. However, by August 1993, Conole attempted to foreclose the track after he noticed that Ishin Development was not paying mortgage payments to Conole, but rather to courts in Harris County. By the following month, with the cancellation of a NASCAR event, the track was rumored to shut down by the Eagle. However, newly-appointed track general manager Wes Kilcrease, who had replaced Barsky on August 13, refuted the claim, stating in the Star-Telegram that it would be "idle only as a spectator track". In December, a foreclosure auction was scheduled for December 7 after Ishin Development failed to pay off mortgage payments in the previous three months.

=== Conole's second ownership period ===
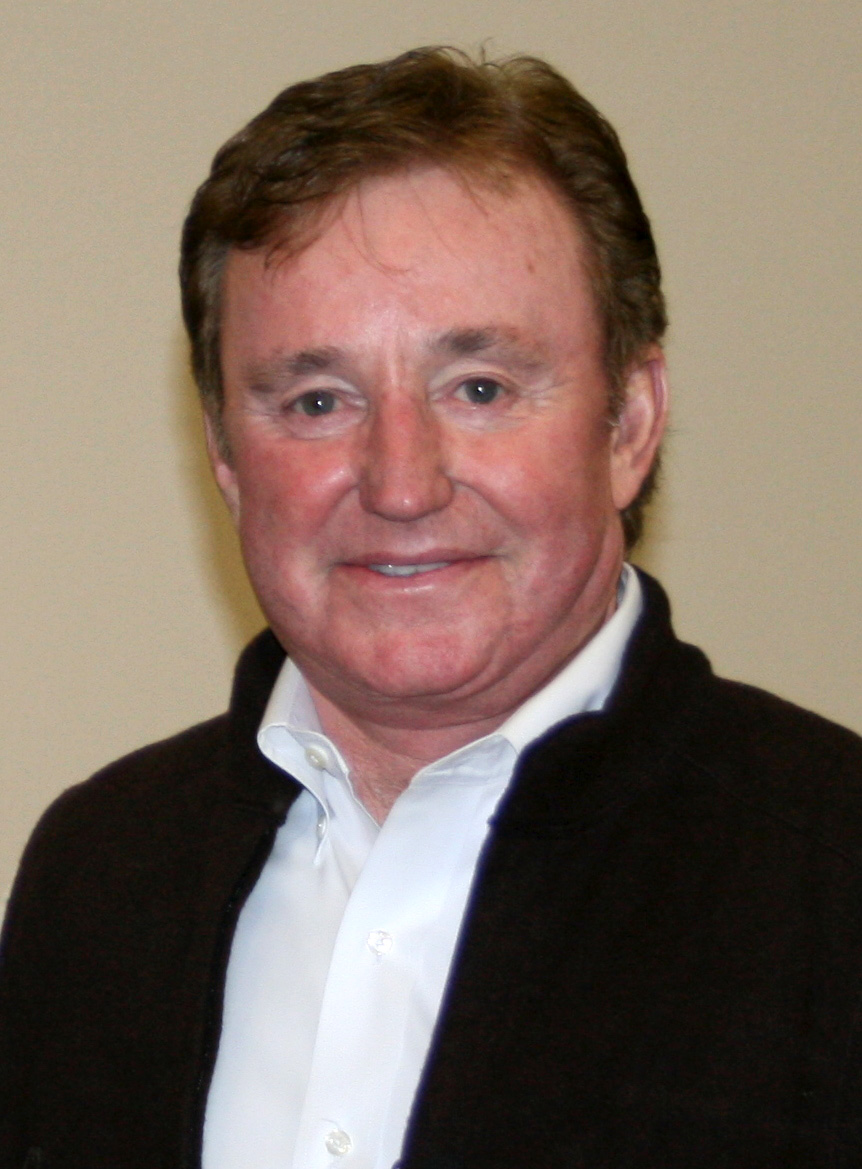
NASCAR team owner Richard Childress (pictured in 2010) was in talks with Conole to purchase TWS in 1994. However, the deal fell through in October of that year.

One hour before the scheduled foreclosure auction, Ishin Development filed for Chapter 11 bankruptcy, who had amassed "nearly $7 million" in debt by the time of the bankruptcy. A foreclosure auction was held in April 1994; Conole, under his company Raceway Limited Partnership, was the only bidder, acquiring the facility for $1 million alongside the acquirement of $250,000 worth of county and state tax liabilities. Shortly after, Conole put the facility up for auction, setting an auction date for August 18. According to local Texas media, numerous potential bidders were rumored to take part in the auction, including motorsports team owner Roger Penske, racing driver A. J. Foyt, then-Indianapolis Motor Speedway president Tony George, then-NASCAR president Bill France Jr., and NASCAR team owner Richard Childress. On the day of the auction, six bidders came to the auction. However, five of them were disqualified after they were to be "unqualified". Initially kept a secret, the only qualified bidder was later revealed to be Childress, who entered talks to purchase the facility in its entirety. However, by October, the deal with Childress fell through; according to the Star-Telegram, if Childress acquired the facility, he intended to use it mainly as a testing facility.

In February 1995, Ishin Development was forced to pay racing driver Johnny Rutherford, who was planning to host a driving school at both TWS and the planned Fort Worth track, $226,000 after a court ruling from the 342nd District Court determined that Ishin "failed to fulfill its end of an agreement to help Rutherford build a driving school". In April 1996, concerns were made public over the structure of the track's main grandstand were raised by Brazos County officials; according to officials, engineers had raised concerns for three years. In response, Conole stated that the structure was inspired by ancient Greek and Roman architecture, proclaiming that "these things will stand long after you and I are gone". In January 1997, a civil lawsuit between Ishin Development and Raceway Limited Partnership over Ishin Development claiming there were undisclosed grandstand defects at the time of the track's sale ended, with Raceway Limited Partnership not being found liable for any hidden damages. After 1997, TWS remained for private renting, amateur racing, and testing. In 2001, the fourth fatality at TWS occurred after racer Brian Capo died during a road course race, dying from a heart arryhthmia. Four years later, TWS was the site of a dead newborn baby, when the baby was found by a track worker in a trash can near the women's bathroom on October 3. The suspect, Susan Chiniewicz, was sentenced in 2007 to two years in prison after being found guilty of causing death by gross negligence.

=== Bill Mather purchase, post-Hurricane Harvey demolition ===
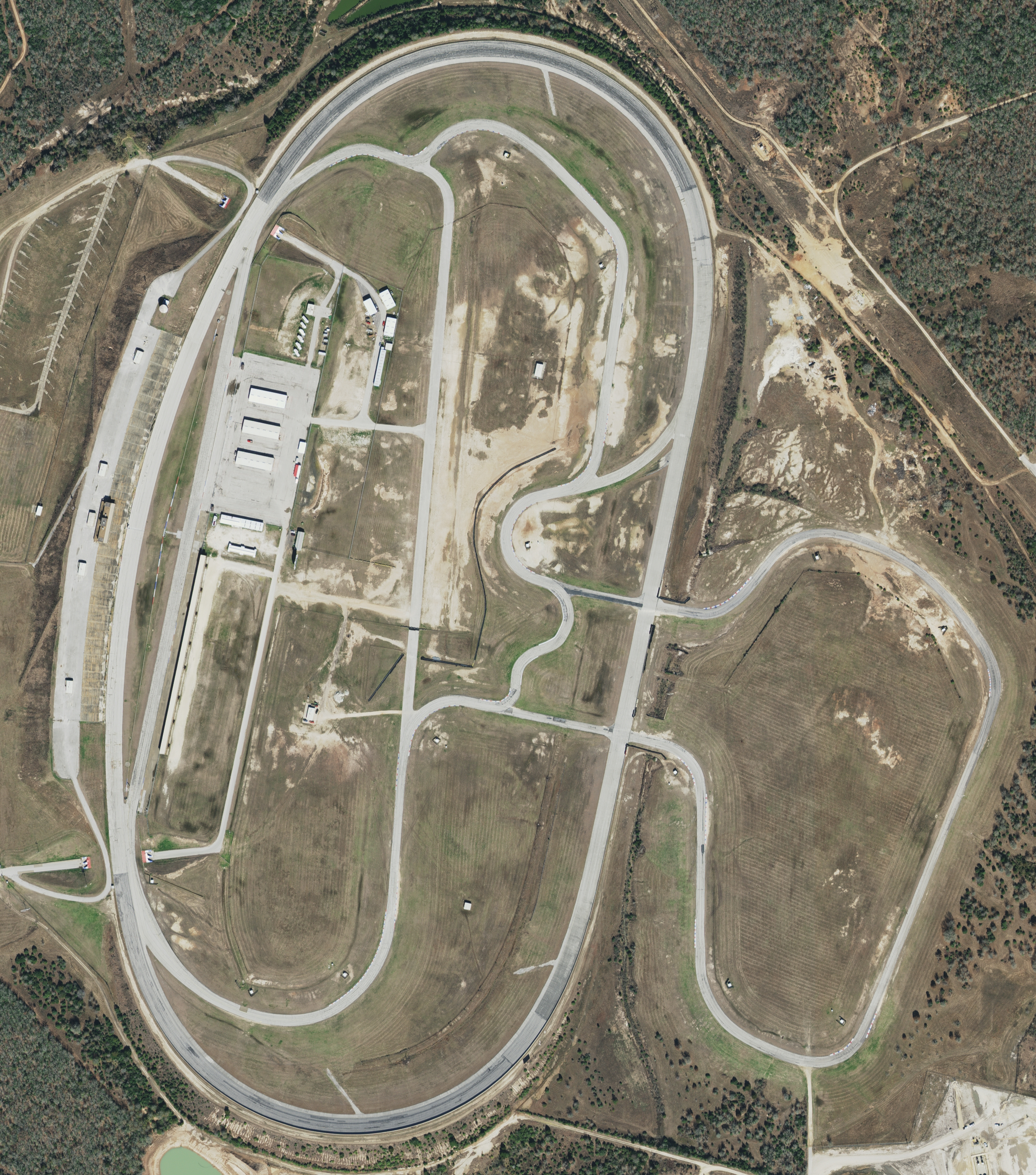
An overhead photo of Texas World Speedway in 2015. During this time, the facility was being considered for demolition for a housing development; plans that ultimately went through.

Conole died on January 3, 2007, at the age of 70. Shortly after his death, TWS was put on sale for $10.5 million according to Roadracing World. In December, Bill Mather, president of Corps Ventures, officially announced the purchase of TWS under Corps Ventures for an undisclosed price, stating that he planned to "run it cleaner, neater, and more efficient to how it has been before". Although he considered demolishing the track and developing it "since the day the deal closed", in the following years, Mather explored options to maintain the track and instead develop the surrounding land for commercial purposes. However, he found the costs to renovate the track into a private membership facility to be unfeasible, stating that it would be in the "hundreds of millions". In March 2014, plans were officially announced to demolish TWS and develop the land into a municipal utility district, which included plans to build 1,400 single-family lots, an elementary school, a business park, greenways, parks, and other amenities. The development was part of a 2009 plan by the city of College Station for its long-term development. The College Station City Council unanimously approved the development plan on March 28. The following year, plans were announced to close TWS in June of that year. However, the closure was delayed to December in June 2015. The plan was further delayed to late 2017; by July of that year, no work had broken ground on the development.

In September 2017, TWS was used as a storage facility for cars affected by flood damage from Hurricane Harvey under a lease from Copart. Jalopnik writer Alanis King described the hurricane as "what finally did it" for the track's permanent closure, with all racing operations ceasing within the month. The damaged vehicles were sold in the coming months to insurance companies. By July 2018, construction on the now-named Southern Pointe housing development began, with Clay Falls of KBTX-TV stating that "part of the track is now gone at the Texas World Speedway property". The first phases of the Southern Pointe housing development opened in April 2019. In February 2020, TWS' press box was demolished. In September 2021, with work set to begin on the next phase of the project, Falls wrote that while project managers wanted to level a hill that formerly contained the track's press box and main grandstands for future development, "it won’t happen anytime soon, but in the coming years". By June 2024, the Southern Pointe housing development covered "more than half" of the track site according to satellite imagery obtained by The Drive's Beverly Braga.

== Events and uses ==
=== Racing events ===
==== NASCAR ====
NASCAR raced at TWS in various periods throughout the track's existence. NASCAR first made an appearance at TWS in 1969, with a nationally-touring NASCAR Cup Series event. After a brief leave, the Cup Series returned to the facility in 1971, remaining annually until 1973. The Cup Series returned to TWS in 1979, remaining annually until 1981. NASCAR returned to TWS in 1992 with a regional NASCAR Winston West Series (now known as the ARCA Racing West Series). The West Series raced at TWS again in 1993; although two races were scheduled, the latter was eventually canceled.

==== Sports car racing ====
The first major sports car race at TWS was a Can–Am race in 1969; the first major race ever held at the facility. Two years after, the IMSA GT Championship made its debut at TWS in 1971. The IMSA GT Championship returned to the facility in 1995, running one more event the year after.

==== Other racing events ====
TWS has held numerous other racing series throughout its existence, including the 24 Hours of Lemons, the AMA Superbike Championship, and the Trans-Am Series. In addition, TWS also held independently-ran racing events, including the Texas Race of Champions.

=== Other events and uses ===
- In 1974, TWS held the second iteration of Willie Nelson's Fourth of July Picnic, a music festival that took place from July 4–6. The festival was known for a chaotic and wild reputation, which included an incident on July 4 where a fire completely destroyed 12 cars and, in total, damaged "some 15" cars according to The Bryan-College Station Eagle's Bobby Templeton.
- In 2009, TWS held the inaugural iteration of the Big State Festival, a country music festival, from October 13–14. Similar to the Fourth of July Picnic, on October 13, an incident occurred where a car caught on fire and affected "more than 20 cars".
- In 2013, TWS held the Hullabalooza Music Festival, a one-day music festival, on November 17.

==== Unrealized events ====
- In 1996, TWS was scheduled to host a Lollapalooza festival on July 25, which at the time was a traveling music festival. However, about a month before the festival, it was moved from TWS to Texan city of Ferris.

== Lap records ==
The fastest recorded lap in an official race meeting was set in the qualifying for the 1973 Texas 200 in fall by Mario Andretti with 33.620s. The fastest official race lap records at Texas World Speedway are listed as:

Category	Time	Driver	Vehicle	Event
Long Road Course (1968–2017): 2.900 mi (4.667 km)
Can-Am	1:33.900	Denny Hulme	McLaren M8B	1969 Texas International Grand Prix
Supersport	1:41.415	Ty Howard	KTM RC8	2010 Texas World CMRA round
Short Road Course (1968–2017): 1.900 mi (3.058 km)
WSC	0:55.948	Max Papis	Ferrari 333 SP	1996 Exxon Superflo 500 at Texas
GTS-1	0:59.638	Irv Hoerr	Oldsmobile Cutlass Supreme	1995 Seitel Texas World Grand Prix
GTS-2	1:03.964	Joe Varde	Porsche 964 Carrera RSR	1995 Seitel Texas World Grand Prix
Trans-Am	1:05.135	Darin Brassfield	Oldsmobile Cutlass Trans-Am	1991 Texas Trans-Am Festival
Infield Road Course (1968–2017): 1.800 mi (2.897 km)
GTU	1:20.450	Peter Gregg	Porsche 911 S	1971 Alamo 200
