= 1995 IMSA GT Championship =

25th season of the racing series organized by IMSA

Seasons
- ← 1994 1996 →

The 1995 Exxon World Sports Car Championship and Supreme GT Series seasons were the 25th season of the IMSA GT Championship. It consisted of open-cockpit prototypes referred to as the World Sports Car (WSC) class and Grand Tourer-style racing cars divided into GTS-1 and GTS-2 classes. It lasted eleven rounds and began on February 4, 1995, and finished on October 8, 1995.

== Schedule ==
Most races on the schedule had all three classes running together, while shorter events saw the classes separated into separate events of varying length. Races marked with All had all classes on track at the same time for the whole race.

Rnd	Race	Length	Class	Circuit	Date
1	Rolex 24 at Daytona	24 Hours	All	Daytona International Speedway	February 4 February 5
2	Exxon MasterCard 12 Hours of Sebring	12 Hours	All	Sebring International Raceway	March 18
3	Rain-X/Motorola Grand Prix of Atlanta	3 Hours	All	Road Atlanta	April 30
4	Moosehead Grand Prix	3 Hours	All	CFB Shearwater	May 21
5	The Dodge Dealers Grand Prix of Lime Rock	1 Hour	GTS	Lime Rock Park	May 29
5	The Dodge Dealers Grand Prix of Lime Rock	1 Hour 45 Minutes	WSC	Lime Rock Park	May 29
6	The Glen Continental	3 Hours	All	Watkins Glen International	June 24
7	Apple Computer Inc. California Grand Prix	1 Hour	GTS-2	Sears Point Raceway	July 16
7	Apple Computer Inc. California Grand Prix	1 Hour 45 Minutes	WSC/GTS-1	Sears Point Raceway	July 16
8	Chrysler Mosport 500	3 Hours	All	Mosport International Raceway	August 13
9	Seitel Texas World Grand Prix	3 Hours	All	Texas World Speedway	September 10
10	Exxon World Sports Car Championships	1 Hour	GTS-2	Phoenix International Raceway	September 30
10	Exxon World Sports Car Championships	2 Hours	WSC/GTS-1	Phoenix International Raceway	September 30
11	Acxiom Grand Prix du Mardi Gras	1 Hour	GTS-2	New Orleans street course	October 8
11	Acxiom Grand Prix du Mardi Gras	1 Hour 45 Minutes	WSC/GTS-1	New Orleans street course	October 8

== Season results ==
Rnd	Circuit	WSC Winning Team	GTS-1 Winning Team	GTS-2 Winning Team	Results
Rnd	Circuit	WSC Winning Drivers	GTS-1 Winning Drivers	GTS-2 Winning Drivers	Results
1	Daytona	(United States) #2 Brix Racing^{†}	(United States) #70 Roush Racing	(Switzerland) #54 Stadler Motorsport	Results
1	Daytona	(Canada) Jeremy Dale (Canada) Jay Cochran (Sweden) Fredrik Ekblom	(United States) Tommy Kendall (United States) Paul Newman (United States) Mike Brockman (United States) Mark Martin	(Switzerland) Enzo Calderari (Switzerland) Lilian Bryner (Germany) Ulli Richter (Italy) Renato Mastropietro	Results
2	Sebring	(United States) #3 Scandia Motorsports	(United States) #75 Cunningham Racing	(United States) #26 Alex Job Racing	Results
2	Sebring	(United States) Andy Evans (Spain) Fermín Vélez (Belgium) Eric van de Poele	(United States) Johnny O'Connell (United States) John Morton (New Zealand) Steve Millen	(United States) Bill Auberlen (United States) Charles Slater (United States) Joe Cogbill	Results
3	Road Atlanta	(United States) #16 Dyson Racing	(United States) #4 Brix Racing	(Peru) #04 Juan Dibos	Results
3	Road Atlanta	(United Kingdom) James Weaver	(United States) Irv Hoerr	(Peru) Eduardo Dibos	Results
4	Halifax	(United States) #3 Scandia Racing Team	(United States) #75 Cunningham Racing	(Costa Rica) #55 Jorge Trejos	Results
4	Halifax	(Spain) Fermín Vélez (Italy) Mauro Baldi	(United States) Johnny O'Connell	(Costa Rica) Jorge Trejos (United States) Dennis Aase	Results
5	Lime Rock	(Italy) #30 Momo	(United States) #5 Brix Racing	(United States) #19 Bill Auberlen	Results
5	Lime Rock	(South Africa) Wayne Taylor (Italy) Gianpiero Moretti	(United States) Darin Brassfield	(United States) Bill Auberlen	Results
6	Watkins Glen	(United States) #16 Dyson Racing	(United States) #4 Brix Racing	(United States) #99 Schumacher Racing	Results
6	Watkins Glen	(United States) Butch Leitzinger (United Kingdom) James Weaver	(United States) Irv Hoerr	(United States) Larry Schumacher (United States) Andy Pilgrim	Results
7	Sears Point	(United States) #16 Dyson Racing	(United States) #75 Cunningham Racing	(United States) #63 The Racer's Group	Results
7	Sears Point	(United Kingdom) James Weaver	(United States) Johnny O'Connell	(United States) Kevin Buckler	Results
8	Mosport	(United States) #16 Dyson Racing	(United States) #47 Charles Morgan	(Costa Rica) #55 Jorge Trejos	Results
8	Mosport	(United Kingdom) James Weaver (United Kingdom) Andy Wallace	(United States) Charles Morgan (United States) Rob Morgan	(Costa Rica) Jorge Trejos (United States) Joe Varde	Results
9	Texas	(Italy) #30 Momo	(United States) #4 Brix Racing	(United States) #19 Bill Auberlen	Results
9	Texas	(South Africa) Wayne Taylor	(United States) Irv Hoerr	(United States) Bill Auberlen	Results
10	Phoenix	(United States) #3 Scandia Racing Team	(United States) #4 Brix Racing	(United States) #19 Bill Auberlen	Results
10	Phoenix	(Spain) Fermín Vélez	(United States) Irv Hoerr	(United States) Bill Auberlen	Results
11	New Orleans	(United States) #16 Dyson Racing	(United States) #4 Brix Racing	(United States) #26 Alex Job Racing	Results
11	New Orleans	(United Kingdom) James Weaver	(United States) Irv Hoerr	(United States) Bill Auberlen	Results

† - The 24 Hours of Daytona was won by Kremer Racing, but their car did not comply with WSC rules and therefore did not score points. Brix Racing was the highest finishing WSC-class car.
