= 1995 12 Hours of Sebring =

Sports car endurance race

The 43rd Exxon Mastercard 12 Hours of Sebring was an endurance racing sports car event held at Sebring International Raceway from March 15–18, 1995. The race served as the second round of the 1995 IMSA GT Championship.

== Race results ==
Class winners in bold.

Pos	Class	No	Team	Drivers	Car	Laps
1	**WSC**	**3**	**(United States) Scandia Motorsports**	**(Spain) Fermín Vélez (United States) Andy Evans (Belgium) Eric van de Poele**	**Ferrari 333 SP**	**260**
2	WSC	9	(United States) Auto Toy Store Inc.	(United Kingdom) Andy Wallace (Netherlands) Jan Lammers (United Kingdom) Derek Bell	Spice SE90	260
3 DNF	WSC	63	(United States) Downing/Atlanta	(United States) Jim Pace (United States) Butch Hamlet (United States) Jim Downing	Kudzu DG-3 WSC	256
4	WSC	33	(United States) Scandia Motorsports	(Italy) Mauro Baldi (Italy) Michele Alboreto (Belgium) Eric van de Poele	Ferrari 333 SP	256
5	**GTS-1**	**75**	**(United States) Cunningham Racing**	**(United States) Johnny O'Connell (New Zealand) Steve Millen (United States) John Morton**	**Nissan 300ZX Turbo**	**255**
6	GTS-1	74	(United States) Champion Porsche	(Germany) Hans-Joachim Stuck (Canada) Bill Adam	Porsche 911 GT2	253
7	WSC	2	(United States) Brix Racing	(Canada) Jeremy Dale (United States) Jay Cochran (Sweden) Fredrik Ekblom	Spice BDG-02	245
8	**LM-WSC**	**00**	**(Germany) Konrad Motorsport**	**(Austria) Franz Konrad (Brazil) Antônio Hermann (Germany) Ernst Schuster**	**Kremer K8**	**244**
9	GTS-1	4	(United States) Brix Racing	(United States) R. K. Smith (United States) Brian DeVries (United States) Irv Hoerr	Oldsmobile Cutlass Supreme	244
10	WSC	6	(United States) Power Macintosh Racing	(Sweden) Stanley Dickens (United States) Rick Sutherland (Canada) John Graham	Spice AK93	244
11	GTS-1	72	(United States) Champion Porsche	(United States) John Fergus (Peru) Neto Jochamowitz	Porsche 911 Turbo	242
12	**GTS-2**	**26**	**(United States) Alex Job Racing**	**(United States) Bill Auberlen (United States) Charles Slater (United States) Joe Cogbill**	**Porsche 911**	**241**
13	GTS-2	93	Ecuador Mobil 1 Racing	(Ecuador) Henry Taleb (Ecuador) Jean-Pierre Michelet (New Zealand) Rob Wilson	Nissan 240SX	240
14	GTS-2	55	(Costa Rica) Jorge Trejos	(United States) Dennis Aase (Costa Rica) Jorge Trejos (United States) Martin Snow (United States) Jim Matthews	Porsche 964 Carrera RSR	240
15	GTS-2	02	(United States) Rohr Corp.	(United States) Larry Schumacher (United Kingdom) Andy Pilgrim (United States) Jeff Purner	Porsche 964 Carrera RSR	239
16	GTS-1	5	(United States) Brix Racing	(United States) Calvin Fish (United States) Mark Dismore (United States) Darin Brassfield	Oldsmobile Cutlass Supreme	234
17	GTS-2	73	(United States) Jack Lewis Enterprises	(United States) Jack Lewis (United States) Hal Kelley (United States) Dave White (United States) Joe Bourassa	Porsche 911 Carrera RSR	232
18	GTS-2	86	(United States) Lloyd Hawkins	(United States) Lloyd Hawkins (United States) David Murry (United States) Shawn Hendricks	Porsche 968 Turbo RS	229
19	GTS-2	18	(United States) Dan Lewis	(United States) Tommy Johnson (United States) Dan Lewis (United Kingdom) John Sheldon	Mazda MX-6	228
20	GTS-2	12	(United States) Prototype Technology Group	(Austria) Dieter Quester (United States) John Paul Jr.	BMW M3	228
21	GTS-1	17	(United States) Art Pilla	(United States) Charles Mendez (United States) Arthur Pilla (United States) Kenper Miller (United States) Dave White	Porsche 911 Turbo	227
22	WSC	50	(Italy) Euromotorsport Racing Inc.	(Italy) Fabrizio Barbazza (United States) Elton Julian (Italy) Massimo Sigala	Ferrari 333 SP	226
23	WSC	37	(United States) Pegasus Racing	(United States) Rick Ferguson (Germany) Oliver Kuttner (Chile) Juan Gac (Chile) Juan Carlos Carbonell	Pegasus-BMW	225
24	GTS-2	99	(Germany) Konrad Motorsport	(United States) Cort Wagner (United States) Bo Roach (Czech Republic) Karel Dolejší	Porsche 911 Carrera RSR	225
25	GTS-1	91	(United States) RVO Motorsports	(United States) Roger Schramm (United States) Steven Petty (United States) Stu Hayner	Chevrolet Camaro	224
26	WSC	0	(United States) Chuck Cotrell	(United States) Leigh Miller (United States) Eric van Cleef (United States) Chuck Cotrell (United States) Mike Holt	Kudzu DG-2 WSC	223
27	GTS-2	13	(United States) Prototype Technology Group	(United States) Pete Halsmer (United States) David Donohue	BMW M3	222
28	GTS-2	82	(United States) Dick Greer Racing	(United States) Al Bacon (United States) Dick Greer (United States) Peter Uria (United States) Mike Mees	Mazda RX-7	221
29	GTS-2	52	(United States) Andy Strasser	(United States) Andy Strasser (United States) Kevin Wheeler (United States) Dennis DeFranchesci	Porsche 911 Carrera RSR	216
30	LM-WSC	10	(Germany) Kremer Racing	(France) Christophe Bouchut (Germany) Jürgen Lässig (Italy) Giovanni Lavaggi	Kremer K8	215
31	GTS-2	27	(United States) Champion Porsche	(United States) Jack Refenning (United States) Tim Vargo (United States) Mike Peters	Porsche 993 Carrera RS	214
32 DNF	GTS-1	69	(Germany) Gustl Spreng Racing	(Germany) Gustl Spreng (United States) Ray Mummery	Porsche 993 Carrera Turbo	212
33	GTS-1	64	(United States) Mel A. Butt	(United States) Mel Butt (United States) Jim Higgs (United States) Ron Zitza	Chevrolet Camaro	212
34	WSC	30	(Italy) Momo	(Italy) Gianpiero Moretti (South Africa) Wayne Taylor (Belgium) Didier Theys	Ferrari 333 SP	211
35 DNF	GTS-2	25	(United States) Alex Job Racing	(United States) Bruce Barkelew (Italy) Angelo Cilli (United States) Gerry Jackson	Porsche 911	209
36	GTS-1	62	(United States) Curren Motorsports	(United States) Billy Bies (United States) Tom Curren (United States) David Rankin (United States) Pat Patterson (United States) Jimmy Hildock	Oldsmobile Cutlass Supreme	205
37	WSC	16	(United States) Dyson Racing	(United Kingdom) James Weaver (United States) Rob Dyson (United States) Butch Leitzinger	Riley & Scott Mk III	201
38	GTS-2	08	(United States) G W Motorwerkes Ltd.	(United States) Danny Marshall (United States) John Biggs (United States) Weldon Scrogham (United States) Steve Marshall	Porsche 911 Carrera RSR	200
39 DNF	GTS-1	47	(United States) Charles Morgan	(United States) Rob Morgan (United States) Charles Morgan	Oldsmobile Cutlass Supreme	195
40	GTS-1	42	(United States) Carolina Racing Engines	(United States) Gary Smith (United States) Jon Leavy (United States) Ron Lowenthal (United States) Luis Sereix	Chevrolet Camaro	186
41	GTS-1	23	(United States) Bob Hundredmark	(United States) Bob Hundredmark (United States) Gene Harry (United States) Steve Pfeffer	Oldsmobile Cutlass Supreme	179
42	GTS-1	90	(United States) Riggins Competition	(United States) Tommy Riggins (United States) Andy Petery (United States) Craig Carter	Oldsmobile Cutlass Supreme	173
43 DNF	GTS-1	67	(Dominican Republic) Luis Mendez	(Dominican Republic) Luis Mendez (United States) Scott Hoerr	Ford Mustang	165
44	GTS-1	87	(United States) John Annis	(United States) John Annis (United States) Louis Beall (United States) David Donavon (United States) Ed Scolaro	Chevrolet Camaro	163
45 DNF	GTS-2	60	(United States) Vito Scavone	(United States) Bill Ferran (United States) Simon Gregg (United States) Scott Tyler	Porsche 911S	159
46	GTS-1	53	(United States) Bill McDill	(United States) Richard McDill (United States) Bill McDill (United States) Tom Juckette	Chevrolet Camaro	157
47	GTS-2	57	(United States) Kryderacing	(United States) Reed Kryder (United States) Frank Del Vecchio	Nissan 240SX	155
48	GTS-2	88	(United States) Douglas Campbell	(United States) Ralph Thomas (United States) Douglas Campbell (United States) Amos Johnson	Mazda RX-7	154
49 DNF	GTS-1	01	(United States) Rohr Corp.	(United States) Hurley Haywood (United States) Jochen Rohr (United States) John O'Steen	Porsche 911 GT2	142
50	GTS-1	71	(United States) Art Cross	(United States) Art Cross (United States) Mark Kennedy (United States) Craig Conway	Chevrolet Camaro	141
51	GTS-1	92	(United States) Hoyt Overbagh	(United States) Mark Montgomery (United States) Hoyt Overbagh (Italy) Mauro Casadei (United States) Steve Goldin (United States) David Kicak	Chevrolet Camaro	139
52 DNF	GTS-1	06	(United States) Doug Rippie	(United States) Bill Cooper (Canada) Scott Maxwell (Canada) Chris McDougall	Chevrolet Corvette ZR-1	121
53	WSC	51	(United States) Bruce Trenery	(United States) Bruce Trenery (United Kingdom) Jeffery Pattinson (United Kingdom) Grahame Bryant (United States) Buddy Norton	Cannibal-Chevrolet	99
54 DNF	WSC	8	(United States) Support Net Racing Inc.	(United States) Roger Mandeville (United States) Henry Camferdam	Hawk MD3R	91
55 DNF	GTS-2	84	(Canada) Vito Scavone	(Canada) Derek Oland (Canada) Vito Scavone (Canada) Alan Jones	Porsche 944 Turbo	91
56 DNF	WSC	44	(United States) Screaming Eagles Racing	(Canada) Ross Bentley (United States) Craig T. Nelson (United States) Dan Clark	Spice SE90	88
57 DNF	GTS-2	58	(United States) Pro Technik Racing	(United States) Sam Shalala (Canada) Doug Frazier (United States) Jim Matthews (United States) Dan Pastorini	Porsche 911	88
58	GTS-1	77	(United States) Tim Banks	(Netherlands) Eric van Vilet (United States) Don Arpin (United States) Tim Hubman (United States) Tim Banks	Chevrolet Camaro	86
59 DNF	WSC	7	(United States) Bobby Brown Motorsports	(United States) Don Bell (United States) Paul Debban (United States) Tom Volk	Spice HC94	81
60 DNF	GTS-2	80	(Italy) Martino Finotto	(Italy) Martino Finotto (Italy) Ruggero Melgrati (United States) John Finger	Ferrari 308 GTB	74
61 DNF	WSC	98	(United Kingdom) Chevron Motorsport	(Canada) Peter Lockhart (United States) Chris Smith (United States) Robbie Buhl	Chevon B71	70
62 DNF	GTS-2	39	(Canada) Rudi Bartling	(Canada) Rudi Bartling (Canada) Ernie Lader (Canada) Ahmad Khodkar (Canada) Rainer Brezinka	Porsche 911	70
63 DNF	GTS-2	68	(United States) Hendricks Porsche	(United States) Charles Coker (United States) Bo Roach (United States) Ken McKinnon	Porsche 968 Turbo	30
64 DNF	GTS-2	78	(United States) Richard Raimist	(United States) Richard Raimist (United States) Karl Singer	Porsche 911 Carrera RSR	20
