= 1996 IMSA GT Championship =

26th season of the racing series organized by IMSA

Seasons
- ← 1995 1997 →

The 1996 Exxon World Sports Car Championship and Supreme GT Series seasons were the 26th season of the IMSA GT Championship. It consisted of open-cockpit prototypes referred to as World Sports Car (WSC) and Grand Tourer-style racing cars divided into GTS-1 and GTS-2 classes. It began February 3, 1996, and ended October 6, 1996, after ten rounds.

== Schedule ==
Most races on the schedule had WSC and GTS-1 classes running together, while the GTS-2 class ran separate races, sometimes with different lengths. Races marked with All had all classes on track at the same time for the whole race.

Rnd	Race	Length	Class	Circuit	Date
1	Rolex 24 at Daytona	24 Hours	All	Daytona International Speedway	February 3 February 4
2	Exxon Superflo 12 Hours of Sebring	12 Hours	All	Sebring International Raceway	March 17
3	Advance Auto Parts Grand Prix of Atlanta	40 Minutes	GTS-2	Road Atlanta	April 21
3	Advance Auto Parts Grand Prix of Atlanta	3 Hours	WSC/GTS-1	Road Atlanta	April 21
4	Exxon Superflo 500 at Texas	500 Miles	All	Texas World Speedway	May 5
5	The Dodge Dealers Grand Prix	1 Hour	GTS-2	Lime Rock Park	May 27
5	The Dodge Dealers Grand Prix	1 Hour 45 Minutes	WSC/GTS-1	Lime Rock Park	May 27
6	First Union Six Hours at the Glen	6 Hours	All	Watkins Glen International	June 9
7	Toshiba California Grand Prix	45 Minutes	GTS-2	Sears Point Raceway	July 14
7	Toshiba California Grand Prix	3 Hours	WSC/GTS-1	Sears Point Raceway	July 14
8	Chrysler Mosport 500	3 Hours	All	Mosport International Raceway	August 25
9	Sprint Grand Prix of Dallas	45 Minutes	GTS-2	Dallas Street Circuit	September 1
9	Sprint Grand Prix of Dallas	2 Hours	WSC/GTS-1	Dallas Street Circuit	September 1
10	Daytona IMSA Finale	3 Hours	All	Daytona International Speedway	October 6

== Season results ==
Rnd	Circuit	WSC Winning Team	GTS-1 Winning Team	GTS-2 Winning Team	Results
Rnd	Circuit	WSC Winning Drivers	GTS-1 Winning Drivers	GTS-2 Winning Drivers	Results
1	Daytona	(United States) #4 Doyle Racing	(United States) #5 Brix Racing	(Switzerland) #55 Stadler Motorsports	Results
1	Daytona	(United States) Jim Pace (United States) Scott Sharp (South Africa) Wayne Taylor	(United States) Rob Morgan (United States) Charles Morgan (United States) Joe Pezza (United States) Jon Gooding (United States) Irv Hoerr	(Switzerland) Enzo Calderari (Switzerland) Lilian Bryner (Germany) Ulli Richter	Results
2	Sebring	(United States) #4 Doyle Racing	(United States) #74 Champion Porsche	(United States) #99 Schumacher Racing	Results
2	Sebring	(United States) Jim Pace (South Africa) Wayne Taylor (Belgium) Eric van der Poele	(Germany) Hans-Joachim Stuck (Canada) Bill Adam	(United States) Larry Schumacher (United States) Will Pace (United States) Andy Pilgrim	Results
3	Road Atlanta	(Italy) #30 Momo Corse	(United States) #1 Brix Racing	#93 Ecuador Mobil 1 Racing	Results
3	Road Atlanta	(Italy) Gianpiero Moretti (Italy) Max Papis	(United States) Irv Hoerr (United States) Darin Brassfield	(Ecuador) Henry Taleb	Results
4	Texas	(United States) #4 Doyle Racing	(United States) #1 Brix Racing	(United States) #99 Schumacher Racing	Results
4	Texas	(United States) Jim Pace (South Africa) Wayne Taylor	(United States) Irv Hoerr (United States) Darin Brassfield	(United States) Larry Schumacher (United States) Andy Pilgrim	Results
5	Lime Rock	(Italy) #30 Momo Corse	(United States) #1 Brix Racing	#93 Ecuador Mobil 1 Racing	Results
5	Lime Rock	(Italy) Gianpiero Moretti (Italy) Max Papis	(United States) Irv Hoerr	(Ecuador) Henry Taleb	Results
6	Watkins Glen	(Italy) #30 Momo Corse	(United States) #5 Brix Racing	(United States) #26 Alex Job Racing	Results
6	Watkins Glen	(Italy) Gianpiero Moretti (Italy) Max Papis	(United States) Irv Hoerr (United States) Darin Brassfield (United States) Brian Cunningham (United States) Brian DeVries	(United States) Hurley Haywood (United States) Charles Slater (United States) Tom Hessert	Results
7	Sears Point	(United States) #4 Doyle Racing	(United States) #5 Brix Racing	(United States) #07 PTG	Results
7	Sears Point	(United States) Scott Sharp (United States) Wayne Taylor	(United States) Irv Hoerr (United States) Darin Brassfield	(United States) Pete Halsmer	Results
8	Mosport Park	(United States) #20 Dyson Racing	(United States) #1 Brix Racing	(United States) #06 PTG	Results
8	Mosport Park	(United States) Butch Leitzinger (United States) John Paul Jr.	(United States) Irv Hoerr	(United States) Boris Said (United States) Pete Halsmer	Results
9	Dallas	(United States) #20 Dyson Racing	(United States) #5 Brix Racing	(United States) #07 PTG	Results
9	Dallas	(United States) Butch Leitzinger	(United States) Irv Hoerr	(United States) Pete Halsmer	Results
10	Daytona	(United States) #20 Dyson Racing	(United States) #91 Rock Valley	(United States) #06 PTG	Results
10	Daytona	(United States) Butch Leitzinger (United States) John Paul Jr.	(United States) Stu Hayner (United States) Roger Schramm	(Costa Rica) Javier Quiros	Results
