= 1992 British Formula Two Championship =

The 1992 British Formula Two Championship was the fourth season of the British Formula 3000 Championship. This year the series was renamed British Formula 2, but the series was in decline with smaller grids than previous years. Champion of 1992 was Yvan Muller who drove for Omegaland. He would later race in International Formula 3000 for the same team, before becoming multiple ice racing champion and touring car star in France and Britain. Britain's Jason Elliott was second for Madgwick, with Peter Kox finishing third overall for Weylock. Future series champ José Luis Di Palma finished fourth in the standings. Other drivers making appearances included Vincenzo Sospiri and Pedro Diniz. Kiwi Craig Baird competed in an ex-Japanese F3000 Dome F102.

== Drivers and teams ==
The following drivers and teams contested the 1992 British Formula Two Championship.

Team	Chassis	Engine	No.	Driver	Rounds
(United Kingdom) Madgwick International	Reynard	Cosworth	1	(United Kingdom) Jason Elliott	All
(United Kingdom) Madgwick International	Reynard	Cosworth	2	(Canada) Claude Bourbonnais	1-3, 5
(United Kingdom) Madgwick International	Reynard	Cosworth	2	(United Kingdom) Nick Adams	8
(United Kingdom) Weylock Racing	Reynard	Cosworth	3	(Netherlands) Peter Kox	All
(United Kingdom) Team AJS	Reynard	Cosworth	5	(Argentina) José Luis Di Palma	All
(United Kingdom) East Essex Racing	Reynard	Cosworth	7	(United Kingdom) Mark Albon	All
(United Kingdom) Graham Lorrimer Motorsport	Dome	Mugen	8	(New Zealand) Craig Baird	All
(United Kingdom) Omegaland	Reynard	Cosworth	10	(France) Yvan Muller	All
(United Kingdom) Valvoline ERM	Ralt	Cosworth	14	(United States) Nick Firestone	1-2
(United Kingdom) Valvoline ERM	Ralt	Cosworth	15	(United Kingdom) Charlie Jeffrey-Burt	1-2
(United Kingdom) Phoenix 3000 Team	Reynard	Cosworth	17	(Sweden) Peter Olsson	All
(United Kingdom) CoBRa Motorsport	Reynard	Cosworth	21	(Italy) Guido Knycz	1-7
(United Kingdom) CoBRa Motorsport	Reynard	Cosworth	21	(Italy) Enrico Bertaggia	8-10
(Italy) Durango Equipe	Lola	Cosworth	23	(Italy) Marco Spiga	1-7
(Italy) Durango Equipe	Lola	Cosworth	23	(Italy) Guido Basile	9
(Germany) Monninghoff Sport Promotion	Reynard	Cosworth	33	(Germany) Klaus Panchryz	5, 7, 9-10
(Italy) Junior Team	Reynard	Cosworth	36	(Italy) Vincenzo Sospiri	6, 8-9
(Italy) Junior Team	Reynard	Cosworth	36	(Italy) Massimo Monti	10
(United Kingdom) Vixen Racing	Reynard	Cosworth	29	(United Kingdom) Steve Bottoms	9-10
(United Kingdom) Edenbridge Racing	Reynard	Cosworth	36	(Brazil) Pedro Diniz	10

== Results ==
=== British Formula Two Championship ===
Round	Date	Circuit	Pole position	Fastest lap	Winning driver	Winning team
1	April 17	(United Kingdom) Oulton Park	(Netherlands) Peter Kox	(Netherlands) Peter Kox	(Netherlands) Peter Kox	(United Kingdom) Weylock Racing
2	April 26	(United Kingdom) Donington Park	(Argentina) José Luis Di Palma	(Argentina) José Luis Di Palma	(United Kingdom) Jason Elliott	(United Kingdom) Madgwick International
3	May 25	(United Kingdom) Brands Hatch (Indy)	(France) Yvan Muller	(France) Yvan Muller	(France) Yvan Muller	(United Kingdom) Omegaland
4	June 14	(United Kingdom) Thruxton	(United Kingdom) Jason Elliott	(United Kingdom) Jason Elliott	(United Kingdom) Jason Elliott	(United Kingdom) Madgwick International
5	June 28	(United Kingdom) Brands Hatch (Indy)	(United Kingdom) Mark Albon	(France) Yvan Muller	(France) Yvan Muller	(United Kingdom) Omegaland
6	July 19	(United Kingdom) Oulton Park	(France) Yvan Muller	(France) Yvan Muller	(France) Yvan Muller	(United Kingdom) Omegaland
7	August 2	(United Kingdom) Snetterton	(United Kingdom) Mark Albon	(Sweden) Peter Olsson	(United Kingdom) Mark Albon	(United Kingdom) East Essex Racing
8	September 6	(United Kingdom) Brands Hatch (GP)	(United Kingdom) Jason Elliott	(United Kingdom) Jason Elliott	(France) Yvan Muller	(United Kingdom) Omegaland
9	September 13	(United Kingdom) Silverstone (National)	(United Kingdom) Mark Albon	(Italy) Vincenzo Sospiri	(Italy) Enrico Bertaggia	(United Kingdom) CoBRa Motorsport
10	October 11	(United Kingdom) Donington Park	(Argentina) José Luis Di Palma	(France) Yvan Muller	(Italy) Massimo Monti	(Italy) Junior Team

== Championship Standings ==
Pos.	Driver	OUL	DON	BHI	THR	BHI	OUL	SNE	BGP	SIL	DON	Points
1	(France) Yvan Muller	2	DNS	1	2	1	1	4	1	2	6	58
2	(United Kingdom) Jason Elliott	3	1	Ret	1	3	2	2	5	6	Ret	41
3	(Netherlands) Peter Kox	1	Ret	2	3	4	Ret	3	2	5	3	38
4	(Argentina) José Luis Di Palma	Ret	5	3	5	2	Ret	7	3	9	5	20
5	(United Kingdom) Mark Albon	Ret	2	4	7	Ret	Ret	1	Ret	Ret	Ret	18
6	(Sweden) Peter Olsson	Ret	Ret	7	4	5	3	6	Ret	8	2	16
7	(Italy) Enrico Bertaggia								4	1	Ret	12
8	(Italy) Massimo Monti										1	9
9	(Canada) Claude Bourbonnais	4	3	5		DNS						9
10	(New Zealand) Craig Baird	7	Ret	6	6	6	4	Ret	Ret	7	4	9
11	(Germany) Klaus Panchryz					Ret		5		4	DNS	5
12	(Italy) Vincenzo Sospiri						Ret		Ret	3		4
13	(United States) Nick Firestone	DNS	4									3
14	(United Kingdom) Charlie Jeffrey-Burt	5	6									3
15	(Italy) Guido Knycz	Ret	DNS	8	8	7	5	Ret				2
16	(Italy) Marco Spiga	6	7	Ret	9	Ret	6	Ret				2
17	(United Kingdom) Nick Adams								6			1
18	(United Kingdom) Steve Bottoms									10	7	0
19	(Brazil) Pedro Diniz										8	0
20	(Italy) Guido Basile									11		0
