= 1995 British Formula Two Championship =

The proposed 1995 British F2 Championship was to be run to a one-make formula, using a slightly modified Reynard 95D fitted with a Cosworth DFY engine. The championship was cancelled at the end of May as it had only one confirmed entry from Madgwick International.

== Drivers and teams ==
The following drivers and teams were entered for the 1995 British Formula Two Championship.

| Team | Driver |
|---|---|
| (United Kingdom) Madgwick International | (Sweden) Peter Olsson |
| (United Kingdom) Richard Arnold Developments | (United Kingdom) Steve Arnold |

== Calendar ==
=== British Formula Two Championship ===
The following calendar was intended to be run before the season's cancellation.

| Round | Date | Circuit |
|---|---|---|
| 1 | June 18 | (United Kingdom) Thruxton |
| 2 | July 9 | (Canada) Halifax |
| 3 | July 29 | (United Kingdom) Oulton Park |
| 4 | August 6 | (United Kingdom) Snetterton |
| 5 | August 13 | (United Kingdom) Donington Park |
| 6 | August 28 | (United Kingdom) Oulton Park |
| 7 | September 9 | (United Kingdom) Silverstone (GP) |
| 8 | September 24 | (United Kingdom) Snetterton |
| 9 | October 30 | (United Kingdom) Donington Park |
