= Paul Warwick (racing driver) =

British racing driver (1969–1991)

- Nationality: (United Kingdom) British
- Born: 29 January 1969 Alresford, Hampshire
- Died: 21 July 1991 (aged 22) Oulton Park, Cheshire
- Relatives: Derek Warwick (brother)

British Formula 3000
- Years active: 1991
- Teams: Madgwick Motorsport
- Starts: 5
- Wins: 5
- Poles: 5
- Fastest laps: 4
- Best finish: 1st in 1991

Previous series
- 1991 1990 1988–1990 1987 1987: Honda CR-X Challenge; International Formula 3000; British Formula Three; European Formula Ford 2000; British Formula Ford 2000

Championship titles
- 1991 1991: British Formula 3000; International Gold Cup

Paul Jason Warwick (29 January 1969 – 21 July 1991) was a British racing driver.

== Career ==
Paul Warwick was born in Alresford, Hampshire, and was the younger brother of fellow racing driver Derek Warwick. He began his junior career in British stock car racing in 1981 in the Ministox formula, before progressing to Superstox for the 1984 season, aged just 15 (due to altering his age on his race licence) racing against many older and much more experienced racers, under the Spedeworth organisation at tracks such as his local Aldershot Stadium and Foxhall Stadium, Ipswich. His brother Derek was the English and World Champion in the formula. Paul became National Champion in 1984 at Ipswich, East Anglian Champion and also British Champion in 1985 at Wisbech.

In his first season of Formula Ford 1600 in 1986, he won eight of the 12 Dunlop-Autosport Star of Tomorrow rounds on his way to the title and scored a championship double by claiming the Townsend Thoresen Junior FF1600 series. In 1987, Warwick moved up to Formula Ford 2000 and was the Euroseries runner-up to future Grand Prix driver JJ Lehto.

In October 1987, Warwick took part in a Ford Escort Celebrity race at Brands Hatch and finished fifth, sharing with Barry McGuigan.

=== British F3 ===
Warwick spent three seasons in British Formula 3 from 1988 to 1990. In 1988 he raced for Eddie Jordan Racing, transferring to Intersport Racing in 1989 and Superpower in 1990. Although tipped as a possible championship contender, Warwick fell short of expectations. During the 1990 season, he quit Formula 3 and contested some Formula 3000 races in the Leyton House backed March Formula 3000 team. The car was poor and Warwick was unable to shine at the rounds he contested, but he adapted to the power increase with some competitive showings. The rounds he took part in were at Brands Hatch, Birmingham, Le Mans and Nogaro.

=== Honda in Tin-tops ===
During the 1990 season, Warwick briefly tried his luck in tin-top racing, contesting a few rounds of the Honda CRX Challenge with his brother's team.

Warwick notably scored a podium third place at Snetterton, where he would also contest the 1991 Willhire 24 Hours in a Honda Civic VTEC, only to retire after completing 155 laps.

=== British F2 ===
In 1991, Warwick signed with Nigel Mansell's Mansell Madgwick British Formula 2 racing team.

Warwick dominated the first five races of 1991, scoring five pole positions, five fastest laps, four lap records and five wins, but he was killed in an accident at the fifth event of the season at Oulton Park race circuit, Cheshire. The win was awarded posthumously as he was leading the race when the accident took place. Warwick had scored enough points in the races he had contested to allow him to win the British Formula 3000 championship. The car left the circuit at the Knickerbrook right hand corner and slammed almost head-on into the outer circuit Armco barrier at 140 miles per hour (230 km/h). The car disintegrated and Warwick was thrown from it. Investigations concluded that a front wishbone failure caused the crash.

== Awards and tributes ==
In 1991, an award by Autosport magazine for the National Driver of the Year was renamed the Paul Warwick Memorial Trophy that was awarded to the season's best British young racing driver.

The main entrance bridge at Oulton Park is named in his memory. In addition, the Knickerbrook corner was slowed by the addition of a chicane.

== Racing results ==
=== Career summary ===
Season	Series	Team	Races	Wins	Poles	F/Laps	Podiums	Points	Position
1986	BARC Formula Ford 1600 – Junior	Derek Warwick Racing	7	7	?	?	7	?	**1st**
1986	Formula Ford 1600 – Junior Townsend Thoresen	Derek Warwick Racing	?	?	?	?	?	?	**1st**
1986	Dunlop Autosport Formula Ford 1600	Derek Warwick Racing	12	8	?	?	?	?	**1st**
1987	Formula Ford 2000 Netherlands		?	?	?	?	?	38	6th
1987	Formula Ford 2000 Great Britain	Middlebridge	?	?	?	?	?	?	5th
1987	Formula Ford 2000 Europe		?	?	?	?	?	?	**2nd**
1988	British Formula Three	Eddie Jordan Racing	17	0	1	0	2	18	8th
1988	Monaco Grand Prix Formula 3	Eddie Jordan Racing	1	0	0	0	0	N/A	13th
1989	British Formula Three	Intersport	16	0	0	0	0	3	18th
1989	Monaco Grand Prix Formula 3	Cellnet Ricom Racing	1	0	0	0	0	N/A	18th
1989	Formula One	USF&G Arrows	Test driver						
1990	British Formula Three	Superpower Engineering	9	0	0	0	1	10	10th
1990	International Formula 3000	Leyton House Racing	3	0	0	0	0	0	NC
1991	British Formula 3000	Mansell Madgwick Motorsport	5	5	5	4	5	45	**1st**

=== Complete International Formula 3000 results ===
(key) (Races in bold indicate pole position) (Races in italics indicate fastest lap)

Year	Entrant	1	2	3	4	5	6	7	8	9	10	11	DC	Points
1990	Leyton House Racing	DON	SIL	PAU	JER	MNZ	PER	HOC	BRH; Ret	BIR; 8	BUG; DNS	NOG; 15	NC	0

=== Complete British Formula 3000 results ===
(key) (Races in bold indicate pole position) (Races in italics indicate fastest lap)

Year	Entrant	1	2	3	4	5	6	7	8	9	10	11	DC	Points
1991	Mansell Madgwick Motorsport	**OUL**; **1**	**DON**; **1**	**BRH**; **1**	**BRH**; **1**	**OUL†**; **1**	SNE	THR	DON	TOA	SIL	DON	**1st**	**45**

Awards and achievements
Preceded by Chris Cramer	Autosport; British Club Driver of the Year; 1986	Succeeded by Eddie Irvine
Sporting positions
Preceded by Pedro Chaves	British Formula 3000 champion 1991	Succeeded by Yvan Muller (British F2)
