= 1996 Belgian Procar Championship =

Seasons
- ← 1995 1997 →

The 1996 Belgian Procar Championship Division 1 was won by Jean Francois Hemruolle driving an Audi A4 Quattro for the Belgian Audi VW Club. The manufacturers' trophy was won by Audi. The Division 2 was won by Christophe Dechavanne driving an Audi 80 Quattro for the Belgian Audi VW Club.

== Teams and drivers ==
Team	Car	No.	Drivers	Round
(Belgium) BMW Fina Bastos Team	BMW 318iS	10	(Belgium) Thierry Tassin	All
(Belgium) BMW Fina Bastos Team	BMW 318iS	11	(Belgium) Marc Duez	All
(Belgium) Peugeot Talbot Belgique	Peugeot 406	12	(Belgium) Eric Bachelart	All
(Belgium) Belgian VW Audi Club	Audi A4 Quattro	14	(Belgium) Jean Francois Hemroulle	All
(Belgium) Belgian VW Audi Club	Audi A4 Quattro	19	(Belgium) Vincent Vosse	7-8
(Belgium) Belgian VW Audi Club	Audi 80 Quattro	22	(France) Christophe Dechavanne	All
Opel Team Belgium	Opel Vectra 16v	15	(Belgium) Pierre Alain Thibaut	All
(Belgium) Honda Team VZM Mobil 1	Honda Accord	16	(Belgium) Didier de Radigues	All
(France) Patrick Herbert	BMW 318iS	17	(Belgium) Patrick Herbert*	3, 7
Nissan Belgium	Nissan Primera eGT	17	(Belgium) Eric van de Poele*	8
Nissan Belgium	Nissan Primera eGT	18	(Germany) Sascha Maassen*	8
(Belgium) Ecurie Bruxelloise	BMW 318iS	20	(Belgium) Stéphane Cohen	1-5, 7
(Belgium) Ecurie Bruxelloise	BMW 318iS	20	(Belgium) Michel Plennevaux	1-7
(Belgium) Ecurie Bruxelloise	BMW 318iS	20	(Belgium) Pascal Witmeur	6
(Belgium) Ecurie Bruxelloise	BMW 318iS	20	(Belgium) Stéphane Meyers	7
(Belgium) Ecurie Bruxelloise	BMW 318iS	26	(Belgium) Robert Dierick	5
(Belgium) Ecurie Bruxelloise	BMW 318iS	28	(Belgium) Robert Dierick	4
(Belgium) Ecurie Bruxelloise	Volkswagen Golf GTi	28	(Belgium) Bernard Winderickx	6-8
(Belgium) Ecurie Bruxelloise	Peugeot 405 Mi16	200	(Belgium) Stéphane Cohen	6
(Belgium) Ecurie Toison d'Or	BMW 318iS	21	(Belgium) Fréderic Bouvy	1-4, 6-8
(Belgium) Ecurie Toison d'Or	BMW 318iS	21	(Belgium) Luc Pensis	5
(Belgium) Ecurie Ardennes	BMW 318iS	23	(Belgium) Didier Defourny	All
(Belgium) Ecurie Pays Noir	BMW 318iS	24	(Belgium) Willy Maljean	1-2, 4–5, 7-8
(Belgium) Ecurie Pays Noir	Opel Vectra 16v	27	(Belgium) Giuseppe Sperlinga	1-4, 7
(Belgium) Ecurie Pays Noir	Opel Vectra 16v	27	(Belgium) Serge Dever	1-4, 7-8
(Belgium) André Carlier	BMW M3	25	(Belgium) André Carlier	4-7
(Belgium) BTC Racing Team	BMW 318iS	26	(Belgium) Philippe Stéveny	1-4
(Belgium) EBRT	BMW 318iS	29	(Belgium) Jean-Pierre van de Wauwer	4-5
(Belgium) EBRT	BMW 318iS	29	(Belgium) Kurt Thiers	5

- not eligible to score championship points *

== Race calendar and results ==
Round		Circuit	Date	Pole position	Winning driver	Winning team
1	R1	(Belgium) Zolder	21 Apr	(Belgium) Jean Francois Hemroulle	(Belgium) Thierry Tassin	(Belgium) BMW Fina Bastos Team
1	R2	(Belgium) Zolder	21 Apr		(Belgium) Jean Francois Hemroulle	(Belgium) Belgian VW Audi Club
2	R1	(Belgium) Spa-Francorchamps	5 May	(Belgium) Thierry Tassin	(Belgium) Jean Francois Hemroulle	(Belgium) Belgian VW Audi Club
2	R2	(Belgium) Spa-Francorchamps	5 May		(Belgium) Pierre Alain Thibaut	Opel Team Belgium
3	R1	(Belgium) Zolder	26 May	(Belgium) Thierry Tassin	(Belgium) Thierry Tassin	(Belgium) BMW Fina Bastos Team
3	R2	(Belgium) Zolder	26 May		(Belgium) Thierry Tassin	(Belgium) BMW Fina Bastos Team
4	R1	(Belgium) Chimay	23 Jun	(Belgium) Jean Francois Hemroulle	(Belgium) Jean Francois Hemroulle	(Belgium) Belgian VW Audi Club
4	R2	(Belgium) Chimay	23 Jun		(Belgium) Jean Francois Hemroulle	(Belgium) Belgian VW Audi Club
5	R1	(Belgium) Spa-Francorchamps	7 Jul	(Belgium) Marc Duez	(Belgium) Didier de Radigues	(Germany) Honda Team VZM Mobil1
5	R2	(Belgium) Spa-Francorchamps	7 Jul		(Belgium) Thierry Tassin	(Belgium) BMW Fina Bastos Team
6	R1	(Belgium) Zolder	31 Aug	(Belgium) Jean Francois Hemroulle	(Belgium) Jean Francois Hemroulle	(Belgium) Belgian VW Audi Club
6	R2	(Belgium) Zolder	31 Aug		(Belgium) Didier de Radigues	(Belgium) Honda Team VZM Mobil 1
7	R1	(Belgium) Spa-Francorchamps	10 Sep	(Belgium) Didier de Radigues	(Belgium) Jean Francois Hemroulle	(Belgium) Belgian VW Audi Club
7	R2	(Belgium) Spa-Francorchamps	10 Sep		(Belgium) Didier de Radigues	(Belgium) Honda Team VZM Mobil 1
8	R1	(Belgium) Spa-Francorchamps	5 Oct	(Belgium) Eric van de Poele	(Belgium) Vincent Vosse	(Belgium) Belgian VW Audi Club
8	R2	(Belgium) Spa-Francorchamps	5 Oct		(Belgium) Jean Francois Hemroulle	(Belgium) Belgian VW Audi Club

== Championship standings ==
Scoring system

Position	1st	2nd	3rd	4th	5th	6th
Points	10	6	4	3	2	1

== Championship results ==
Pos	Driver	ZOL (Belgium)		SPA (Belgium)		ZOL (Belgium)		CHI (Belgium)		SPA (Belgium)		ZOL (Belgium)		SPA (Belgium)		SPA (Belgium)		Pts
1	(Belgium) Jean François Hemroulle	(1)	1	1	4	4	5	1	1	Ret	5	1	2	1	2	4	1	95
2	(Belgium) Didier de Radiguès	6	2	4	3	6	4	2	2	1	Ret	Ret	1	3	1	5	3	70
3	(Belgium) Marc Duez	5	6	Ret	2	2	2	3	3	2	4	2	6	2	3	(1)	4	60
4	(Belgium) Thierry Tassin	2	5	Ret	2	1	1	Ret	Ret	4	1	4	(3)	6	4	3	5	56
5	(Belgium) Eric Bachelart	3	3	2	6	Ret	3	4	4	3	2	3	4	5	6	Ret	Ret	45
6	(Belgium) Pierre Alain Thibaut	4	6	3	1	3	Ret	5	5	5	3	Ret	5	Ret	Ret	6	Ret	35
7	(Belgium) Vincent Vosse													4	5	2	2	17

- Points in the Brackets not awarded due to exclusions

=== Manufacturers' Trophy ===
Pos	Manufacturer	Points
1	(Germany) Audi	98
2	(Germany) BMW	83
3	(Japan) Honda	50
4	(France) Peugeot	45
5	(Germany) Opel	35

== Sources ==
- Touring Car World 96/97 — The official book of Touring car
