= 1993 British Formula Two Championship =

The 1993 British Formula Two Championship was the fifth season of the British Formula 3000 Championship. The series was won by the Belgian driver Philippe Adams, later to make an unsuccessful F1 debut by buying a drive at Team Lotus. He drove for both Madgwick International and Argo Cars during the year, taking five wins including the first four races. British F2 had by this stage become seriously devalued with tiny grids, with an average of only eight entries in each race. Another Belgian, Madgwick's Mikke van Hool, shared the runner-up spot with the Team AJS's José Luis Di Palma. With three and two wins apiece, the two runners-up ensured no-one else stepped on the top step of the podium. Nigel Smith, driving a full season for Jupiter Racing, was fourth overall and best of the Brits. Other drivers racing included sometime F1 driver Enrico Bertaggia and future IndyCar and IRL driver Stéphan Grégoire.

Unfortunately, this season was plagued by the low amount on entries, some races receiving only seven entries, and a maximum of ten entries was achieved during the season.

== Drivers and teams ==
The following drivers and teams contested the 1993 British Formula Two Championship.

Team	Chassis	Engine	No.	Driver	Rounds
(United Kingdom) Madgwick International	Reynard	Cosworth	2	(Belgium) Mikke van Hool	3-10
(United Kingdom) Madgwick International	Reynard	Cosworth	3	(Belgium) Philippe Adams	1-4
(United Kingdom) Team AJS	Reynard	Cosworth	4	(Argentina) José Luis Di Palma	All
(Italy) Durango Corse	Reynard	Cosworth	5	(Italy) Enrico Bertaggia	1-3
(Italy) Durango Corse	Reynard	Cosworth	5	(Italy) Martino Spezio	7
(Italy) Durango Corse	Reynard	Cosworth	5	(Italy) Domenico Gitto	8
(Italy) Durango Corse	Reynard	Cosworth	6	(Italy) Severino Nardozzi	1-3
(United Kingdom) McNeil Engineering	Lola	Cosworth	7	(Canada) Robbie Stirling	3–6, 8, 10
(United Kingdom) CoBRa Motorsport	Reynard	Cosworth	8	(France) Stéphan Grégoire	1
(United Kingdom) CoBRa Motorsport	Reynard	Cosworth	8	(United Kingdom) Phil Andrews	2, 4
(United Kingdom) CoBRa Motorsport	Reynard	Cosworth	8	(Canada) Robbie Stirling	9
(United Kingdom) CoBRa Motorsport	Reynard	Cosworth	8	(Netherlands) Klaas Zwart	10
(Netherlands) Vortex Motorsport	Reynard	Cosworth	10	(United Kingdom) Phil Andrews	1
(United Kingdom) Apache Racing	Ralt	Cosworth	11	(United Kingdom) Dominic Chappell	1-9
(United Kingdom) Apache Racing	Reynard	Cosworth	12	(United Kingdom) James Taylor	1-8
(United Kingdom) Apache Racing	Reynard	Cosworth	12	(United Kingdom) Jason Elliott	9
(United Kingdom) Fred Goddard Racing	Reynard	Cosworth	14	(South Africa) Hilton Cowie	4-5
(United Kingdom) Fred Goddard Racing	Reynard	Cosworth	14	(United Kingdom) Paul Evans	9
(United Kingdom) Weylock Racing	Reynard	Cosworth	15	(Italy) Guido Nannini	2-3
(United Kingdom) Weylock Racing	Reynard	Cosworth	15	(Austria) Pierre Chauvet	8
(United Kingdom) Weylock Racing	Reynard	Cosworth	15	(United Kingdom) Jason Elliott	10
(United Kingdom) Argo Racing Cars	Reynard	Cosworth	20	(Italy) Marco Spiga	1-7
(United Kingdom) Argo Racing Cars	Reynard	Cosworth	20	(Belgium) Philippe Adams	9-10
(United Kingdom) Chris Perkins	Reynard	Cosworth	21	(United Kingdom) Chris Perkins	10
(United Kingdom) Jupiter Racing	Reynard	Cosworth	42	(United Kingdom) Nigel Smith	All

== Results ==
=== British Formula Two Championship ===
Round	Date	Circuit	Pole position	Fastest lap	Winning driver	Winning team
1	April 12	(United Kingdom) Oulton Park	(Argentina) José Luis Di Palma	(Belgium) Philippe Adams	(Belgium) Philippe Adams	(United Kingdom) Madgwick International
2	April 24	(United Kingdom) Silverstone (National)	(Belgium) Philippe Adams	(Belgium) Philippe Adams	(Belgium) Philippe Adams	(United Kingdom) Madgwick International
3	May 9	(United Kingdom) Brands Hatch (Indy)	(Belgium) Philippe Adams	(Belgium) Philippe Adams	(Belgium) Philippe Adams	(United Kingdom) Madgwick International
4	June 6	(United Kingdom) Donington Park	(Belgium) Philippe Adams	(Belgium) Philippe Adams	(Belgium) Philippe Adams	(United Kingdom) Madgwick International
5	June 19	(United Kingdom) Oulton Park	(Argentina) José Luis Di Palma	(Argentina) José Luis Di Palma	(Belgium) Mikke van Hool	(United Kingdom) Madgwick International
6	July 25	(United Kingdom) Brands Hatch (Indy)	(Italy) Marco Spiga	(Belgium) Mikke van Hool	(Argentina) José Luis Di Palma	(United Kingdom) Team AJS
7	August 15	(United Kingdom) Snetterton	(Belgium) Mikke van Hool	(Belgium) Mikke van Hool	(Belgium) Mikke van Hool	(United Kingdom) Madgwick International
8	September 12	(United Kingdom) Brands Hatch (GP)	(Belgium) Mikke van Hool	(Belgium) Mikke van Hool	(Belgium) Mikke van Hool	(United Kingdom) Madgwick International
9	September 26	(United Kingdom) Thruxton	(Belgium) Philippe Adams	(Belgium) Philippe Adams	(Belgium) Philippe Adams	(United Kingdom) Argo Racing Cars
10	October 10	(United Kingdom) Donington Park	(Argentina) José Luis Di Palma	(Belgium) Philippe Adams	(Argentina) José Luis Di Palma	(United Kingdom) Team AJS

== Championship Standings ==
Pos.	Driver	OUL	SIL	BHI	DON	OUL	BHI	SNE	BGP	THR	DON	Points
1	(Belgium) Philippe Adams	1	1	1	1					1	Ret	45
2	(Belgium) Mikke van Hool			2	Ret	1	Ret	1	1	2	4	42
3	(Argentina) José Luis Di Palma	Ret	2	4	4	Ret	1	2	2	7	1	42
4	(United Kingdom) Nigel Smith	6	3	3	8	3	2	3	Ret	5	3	29
5	(United Kingdom) Dominic Chappell	4	Ret	6	6	4	3	4	Ret	3		19
6	(Canada) Robbie Stirling			9	Ret	DNS	4		3	6	2	14
7	(United Kingdom) James Taylor	NC	4	8	7	5	5	5	4			12
8	(Italy) Marco Spiga	Ret	6	7	5	2	6	Ret				10
9	(Italy) Enrico Bertaggia	2	Ret	5								8
10	(United Kingdom) Phil Andrews	Ret	Ret		2							6
11	(South Africa) Hilton Cowie				3	6						5
12	(France) Stéphan Grégoire	3										4
13	(Italy) Severino Nardozzi	5	5	Ret								4
14	(United Kingdom) Paul Evans									4		3
15	(Netherlands) Klaas Zwart										5	2
16	(United Kingdom) Chris Perkins										6	1
17	(Italy) Guido Nannini		7	10								0
	(United Kingdom) Jason Elliott									Ret	DNS	
	(Italy) Martino Spezio							Ret				
	(Austria) Pierre Chauvet							Ret				
	(Italy) Domenico Gitto								DNS			
