= Philippe Adams =

Belgian racing driver (born 1969)

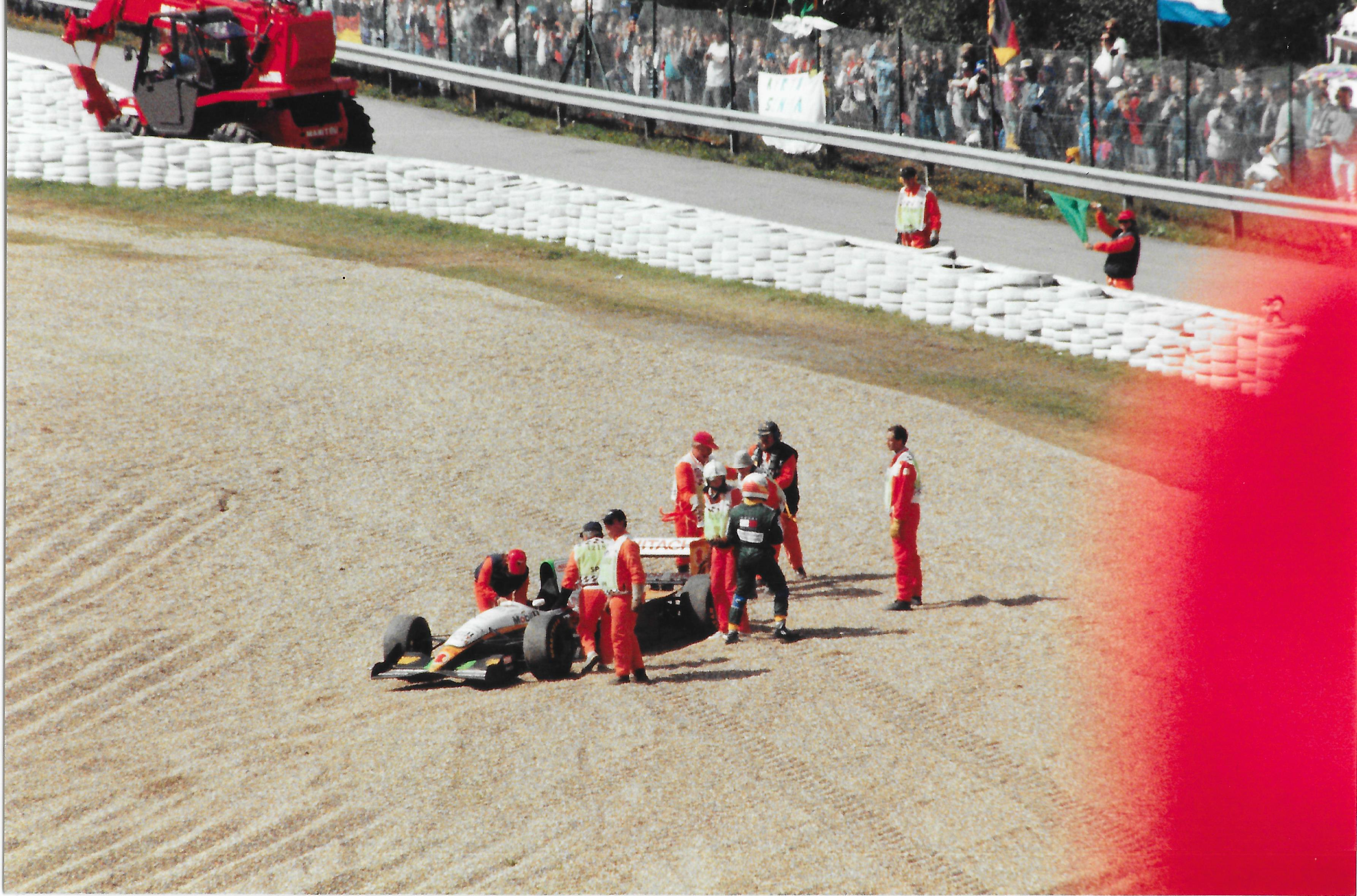
- Philippe Adams retired from his Formula One race debut on lap 15
- Born: 19 November 1969 (age 56); Mouscron, Belgium

Formula One World Championship career
- Nationality: (Belgium) Belgian
- Active years: 1994
- Team: Lotus
- Entries: 2
- Championships: 0
- Wins: 0
- Podiums: 0
- Career points: 0
- Pole positions: 0
- Fastest laps: 0
- First entry: 1994 Belgian Grand Prix
- Last entry: 1994 Portuguese Grand Prix

Philippe Adams (French pronunciation: [fi.lip a.dɑ̃]; born 19 November 1969) is a Belgian racing driver.

== Career ==
=== Early career ===
Adams was born in Mouscron, Wallonia, Belgium. He first began in motorsport at the age of twelve, racing karts, before beginning in car racing in 1984. In 1992, Adams competed in the British Formula 3 Championship, finishing second overall in the season. Adams went on to the British Formula Two Series for 1993, winning the championship.

=== Formula One (1994) ===
Adams and his backers agreed with Team Lotus to find $500,000 to earn a pay-drive with them for two rounds of the 1994 Formula One season. Part of the funding for this came from an insurance policy taken out against his Belgian Procar race at Spa alongside the F1 race, which he won. He retired from the Belgian round, but managed to finish 16th in the Portuguese round. In between these two races, regular driver Alessandro Zanardi qualified a strong 13th for his home race. Adams was also intended to race at Jerez, but the team gave the drive back to Zanardi.

=== After Formula One ===
Adams never returned to Formula One opting to return to the national scene, primarily in production car and sportscar racing.

== Racing record ==
=== Complete Japanese Formula 3000 results ===
(key) (Races in bold indicate pole position) (Races in italics indicate fastest lap)

Year	Entrant	1	2	3	4	5	6	7	8	9	10	11	DC	Points
1991	CSK Racing	SUZ	AUT	FUJ	MIN	SUZ	SUG	FUJ	SUZ	FUJ	SUZ; DNQ	FUJ	NC	0

=== Complete British Formula Two Championship results ===
(key) (Races in bold indicate pole position) (Races in italics indicate fastest lap)

Year	Entrant	1	2	3	4	5	6	7	8	9	10	DC	Points
1993	Madgwick International	OUL; 1	**SIL**; 1	**BHI**; 1	**DON**; 1	OUL	BHI	SNE	BGP			1st	45
1993	Argo Racing Cars									**THR**; 1	DON; Ret	1st	45

=== Complete Formula One results ===
(key)

Year	Entrant	Chassis	Engine	1	2	3	4	5	6	7	8	9	10	11	12	13	14	15	16	WDC	Points
1994	Team Lotus	Lotus 109	Mugen-Honda V10	BRA	PAC	SMR	MON	ESP	CAN	FRA	GBR	GER	HUN	BEL; Ret	ITA	POR; 16	EUR	JPN	AUS	NC	0

=== Complete Super Tourenwagen Cup results ===
(key) (Races in bold indicate pole position) (Races in italics indicate fastest lap)

Year	Team	Car	1	2	3	4	5	6	7	8	Pos.	Pts
1994	Belgian VW Audi Club	Audi 80 Quattro Competition	AVU	WUN	ZOL; 6	ZAN	ÖST	SAL	SPA	NÜR	16th	6

Sporting positions
Preceded by Yvan Muller	British Formula 2 Championship; Champion; 1993	Succeeded by José Luis Di Palma
