= British Formula 3000 =

Motor racing competition

- Category: Single seaters
- Country: United Kingdom
- Inaugural season: 1989
- Folded: 1996

The British Formula 3000 championship, alternatively known as the British Formula Two Championship, was a competition for Formula 3000 held in the United Kingdom, active from 1989 to 1994 and in 1996. Several attempts to restart the series since then have met with failure.

== British F3000 ==
The original championship was started in 1989 as a national series for one-year-old F3000 single-seaters. Cars from both Lola and Reynard could be seen on the grid, with the predominant engine being the Cosworth DFY. Grids increased until the series reached its apex in 1991.

The first two champions, Gary Brabham and Pedro Chaves, moved up to Formula One but met little success, never qualifying for a race. In 1991, Paul Warwick, younger brother to F1 driver Derek, dominated the first half of the series but died in a crash mid-season at Oulton Park. He retained the lead through the final round and was awarded the title posthumously.

== British F2 ==
In 1992, the championship was renamed Formula Two, although it had nothing to do with the competition that had previously carried that name, continuing to be an actual Formula 3000 series. Grids kept dwindling and after mid-1993 less than ten cars appeared regularly on the grid.

Yvan Muller won the title in 1992 before leaving single-seaters and moving to touring car racing, but 1993 champion Philippe Adams had a brief career in F1. José Luis Di Palma was champion the next year but competitive drivers were few.

In 1995, an attempt to switch to a spec series with Reynard chassis and Cosworth engines failed to get off the ground when the series was cancelled after posting only one entry. In 1996 the series was resurrected and Gareth Rees dominated the action, and was the final champion.

== UK3000 and Autumn Cup ==
A new British F3000 was introduced in 1997, now following the spec rules of the International Formula 3000 series, featuring Lola T96/50 chassis and Zytek engines, but the new championship was cancelled after the first round was contested by only three cars.

In 1999, an attempt at creating the UK3000 Championship was interrupted at the last minute when the FIA decided against limiting the grid sizes and teams dropped the British series for the International one, finishing UK3000 before it started. An Italian-based national series met with more success, though.

The BRSCC attempted to create a Formula 3000 Autumn Cup at the end of the 2000 season, with Lola B99/50 chassis, but although some International teams pledged to enter the series, a low number of entries made it impossible to start the series with any quality grids.

== Champions ==
| Season | Champion | Team | Car |
|---|---|---|---|
| 1989 | (Australia) Gary Brabham | (United Kingdom) Bromley Motorsport | Reynard 88D-Cosworth |
| 1990 | (Portugal) Pedro Chaves | (United Kingdom) Mansell Madgwick Motorsport | Reynard 90D-Cosworth |
| 1991 | (United Kingdom) Paul Warwick | (United Kingdom) Mansell Madgwick Motorsport | Reynard 90D-Cosworth |
| 1992 | (France) Yvan Muller | (United Kingdom) Omegaland | Reynard 91D-Cosworth |
| 1993 | (Belgium) Philippe Adams | (United Kingdom) Madgwick International (United Kingdom) Argo Racing Cars | Reynard 91D-Cosworth; Reynard 92D-Cosworth |
| 1994 | (Argentina) José Luis Di Palma | (United Kingdom) AJS Racing (United Kingdom) Madgwick International | Reynard 92D-Cosworth |
| 1995 | Not held | | |
| 1996 | (United Kingdom) Gareth Rees | (United Kingdom) Super Nova Racing | Reynard 95D-Cosworth |
| 1997 | Championship cancelled after one round | | |
