= José Luis Di Palma =

Argentine racing driver

José Luis Di Palma (born March 31, 1966), is an Argentine racing driver who competed in British Formula Two, Indy Lights, Turismo Carretera, Top Race and Dakar Rally.

He was born in Mar del Plata, Buenos Aires province. Several relatives are also racecar drivers, including his father Luis Rubén, his brothers Patricio and Marcos, and his son Luis José.

== Racing career ==
=== Early career ===
Di Palma began his professional career racing in the Argentine TC 2000 Championship in 1984. After three years in the series and few notable results, Di Palma moved to formula car racing in Formula Three Sudamericana in 1987. He finished eighth in points in his rookie season and improved to seventh in 1988. He placed ninth in 1989.

=== Europe and Indy Lights ===
In 1990, Di Palma moved to Europe to race in Formula Opel Lotus Euroseries where he finished ninth. In 1991, he raced in British Formula 3000 for Cobra Motorsport and finished 11th. The series became British Formula 2 in 1991 and Di Palma finished fourth in points for AJS. Di Palma continued with the team in British F2 in 1993 and was runner-up in the championship and captured two wins. In 1994, he won the championship driving for Madgwick International, again capturing two wins.

The series was not held in 1995, so Di Palma competed in eight races in the American Indy Lights series in 1995 for Leisy McCormack Racing. He finished 19th in points with a best finish of fifth at Toronto. He returned to Indy Lights full-time in 1996, this time driving for Tasman Motorsports. Di Palma finished ninth in points with a best finish of fourth at Belle Isle. Di Palma's Tasman teammates Tony Kanaan and Hélio Castroneves finished second and seventh in points, respectively.

=== Return to South America ===
In 1997, Di Palma competed in the South American Super Touring Car Championship and finished eighth and made four starts in Turismo Carretera. He competed in Turismo Carretera full-time in 1998 and finished seventh. In 1999, in the same series, he finished fourth. Di Palma continued to race in Turismo Carretera until 2009, also finishing fourth in points in 2001, matching his career best. Di Palma also competed in the Dakar Rally across South America in 2010 and 2011.

== Motorsports results ==
=== American Open-Wheel racing results ===
(key) (Races in bold indicate pole position, races in italics indicate fastest race lap)

==== Indy Lights ====
Year	Team	1	2	3	4	5	6	7	8	9	10	11	12	Rank	Points	Ref
1995	McCormack Racing	MIA; 6	PHX	LBH	NAZ	MIL	DET; 13	POR; 7	TOR; 5	CLE; 15	NHA; 13	VAN; 20	LS; 25	**15th**	**24**	
1996	Tasman Motorsports	MIA; 15	LBH; 6	NAZ; 6	MIS; 8	MIL; 14	DET; 4	POR; 11	CLE; 7	TOR; 8	TRO; 11	VAN; 6	LS; 13	**9th**	**56**	

==== Barber Dodge Pro Series ====
Year	1	2	3	4	5	6	7	8	9	10	11	12	Rank	Points
1997	STP	SEB	SAV	LRP	MOH	WGI	MIN; 14	MOH; 16	ROA	LS	REN	LS	???	???

Sporting positions
Preceded by Philippe Adams	British Formula 2 champion 1994	Succeeded by Gareth Rees (1996)
