= Irv Hoerr =

American racing driver (born 1946)

- Born: November 14, 1946 (age 79); Peoria, Illinois

NASCAR Cup Series career
- 7 races run over 4 years
- Best finish: 47th (1990)
- First race: 1987 Winston Western 500 (Riverside)
- Last race: 1992 Save Mart 300K (Sears Point)
Wins	Top tens	Poles
0	2	0

Irv Hoerr (born November 14, 1946) is an American racing driver from Peoria, Illinois. He is primarily known for racing in several sports car racing series. Hoerr was the 1992 IMSA GTO champion. He moved up to the GTS-1 class winning the 1995 and 1996 titles. Hoerr made seven NASCAR Winston Cup Series starts and had two top-ten finishes.

== Racing career ==
=== Sports car racing ===
Hoerr raced for Rocketsports Racing in International Motor Sports Association (IMSA). He won the 1992 GTO class championship in an Oldsmobile Cutlass. He moved to the GTS class winning the 1995 and 1996 titles.

Hoerr moved to a part-time schedule after the 1996 season and he continued to make occasional starts until 2002. He ended with seven championships, six in four IMSA divisions and another in the Latin America GT series.

=== NASCAR ===
Hoerr competed primarily as a road course ringer. He made his first NASCAR start in the final race at Riverside International Raceway in the 1987 Winston Western 500. After not competing in a NASCAR race for a couple seasons, he entered two events in 1990. Hoerr's best NASCAR finish, an eighth place result, happened at Sears Point Raceway; later that season he claimed his only other top-ten finish when he race to tenth at Watkins Glen International.

Hoerr made his first attempt at an oval track at North Wilkesboro Speedway in 1991 but he failed to make the field. A rear end failed caused him to end up with 36th place finish at Sears Point later that season. Hoerr made his first non-road course at Pocono Raceway (a tri-oval which races similar to a road course); he finished 19th. His last NASCAR start of the season happened at Watkins Glen; it ended after eight laps with engine problems. Hoerr made his last NASCAR start in 1992 at Sears Point; he finished 41st with engine problems.

== Honors ==
- Hoerr was named the Motorweek Road Race Driver of the Year in 1986.
- Hoerr was also named the Norelco Cup Driver of the Year in 1989.
- The American Auto Racing Writers and Broadcasters Association named Hoerr to their All-America Racing Team in 1992 and 1995.
- Hoerr was named to the Greater Peoria Sports Hall of Fame.

== Personal life ==
Hoerr operates Hoerr Racing Products in Peoria along with his brother Scott Hoerr.

== Motorsports career results ==
=== NASCAR ===
(key) (Bold – Pole position awarded by qualifying time. Italics – Pole position earned by points standings or practice time. * – Most laps led.)

==== Winston Cup Series ====
NASCAR Winston Cup Series results
Year	Team	No.	Make	1	2	3	4	5	6	7	8	9	10	11	12	13	14	15	16	17	18	19	20	21	22	23	24	25	26	27	28	29	NWCC	Pts	Ref
1987	Baker-Schiff Racing	88	Olds	DAY	CAR	RCH	ATL	DAR	NWS	BRI	MAR	TAL	CLT	DOV	POC	RSD	MCH	DAY	POC	TAL	GLN	MCH	BRI	DAR	RCH	DOV	MAR	NWS	CLT	CAR	RSD; 22	ATL	107th	-	
1990	Precision Products Racing	0	Olds	DAY	RCH	CAR	ATL	DAR	BRI	NWS	MAR	TAL	CLT	DOV	SON; 8	POC	MCH	DAY	POC	TAL	GLN; 10	MCH	BRI	DAR	RCH	DOV	MAR	NWS	CLT	CAR	PHO	ATL	47th	281	
1991	Labonte Motorsports	44	Olds	DAY	RCH	CAR	ATL	DAR	BRI	NWS; DNQ	MAR	TAL	CLT	DOV	SON; 36	POC	MCH	DAY	POC; 19	TAL	GLN; 38	MCH	BRI	DAR	RCH	DOV	MAR	NWS	CLT	CAR	PHO	ATL	52nd	210	
1992	Precision Products Racing	0	Olds	DAY	CAR	RCH	ATL	DAR	BRI	NWS	MAR	TAL	CLT	DOV	SON; 41	POC	MCH	DAY	POC	TAL	GLN	MCH	BRI	DAR	RCH	DOV	MAR	NWS	CLT	CAR	PHO	ATL	95th	40	
