= 1994 International Formula 3000 Championship =

Motor racing competition

The 1994 Formula 3000 International Championship was the tenth season of Formula 3000 in Europe. Jean-Christophe Boullion won the championship after eight rounds.

== Technical changes ==
After a year out of Europe, Lola returned with an extensively developed new car. Reynard was still the dominant manufacturer, and retained many components from its previous car while introducing an F1-style high nose.

The regulation requiring long sidepods was removed, which meant that the cars became less pitch-sensitive. The long —vortex generators— on the front wing endplates were banned as part of an ongoing effort to reduce costs.

== Drivers and constructors ==
Team	Chassis	Engine	No.	Driver	Rounds
(France) DAMS	Reynard 94D	Ford Cosworth AC	1	(France) Jean-Christophe Boullion	All
(France) DAMS	Reynard 94D	Ford Cosworth AC	2	(France) Guillaume Gomez	All
(United Kingdom) Paul Stewart Racing	Reynard 94D	Zytek Judd KV	5	(Brazil) Gil de Ferran	All
(United Kingdom) Paul Stewart Racing	Reynard 94D	Zytek Judd KV	6	(France) Didier Cottaz	All
(Italy) Auto Sport Racing	Reynard 93D	Ford Cosworth AC	7	(Italy) Paolo Delle Piane	4–6
(Italy) Auto Sport Racing	Reynard 94D	Ford Cosworth AC	7	(Italy) Paolo Delle Piane	7–8
(Italy) Forti Corse	Reynard 94D	Ford Cosworth AC	9	(Brazil) Pedro Diniz	All
(Italy) Forti Corse	Reynard 94D	Ford Cosworth AC	10	(Japan) Hideki Noda	All
(Italy) Mythos Racing	Reynard 94D	Zytek Judd KV	11	(Italy) Fabrizio De Simone	All
(Italy) Mythos Racing	Reynard 94D	Zytek Judd KV	12	(Italy) Massimiliano Papis	All
(France) Apomatox	Reynard 94D	Ford Cosworth AC	14	(France) Emmanuel Clérico	All
(France) Apomatox	Reynard 94D	Ford Cosworth AC	15	(France) Franck Lagorce	All
(Netherlands) Vortex Motorsport	Reynard 94D	Ford Cosworth AC	16	(Italy) Paolo Delle Piane	1–3
(Netherlands) Vortex Motorsport	Reynard 94D	Ford Cosworth AC	16	(United Kingdom) James Taylor	4–8
(Netherlands) Vortex Motorsport	Reynard 94D	Ford Cosworth AC	17	(Brazil) Tarso Marques	All
(Netherlands) Vortex Motorsport	Reynard 94D	Ford Cosworth AC	25	(United Kingdom) David Coulthard	1
(Netherlands) Vortex Motorsport	Reynard 94D	Ford Cosworth AC	25	(United Kingdom) Allan McNish	2
(United Kingdom) Omegaland	Lola T94/50	Zytek Judd KV	18	(United Kingdom) Oliver Gavin	1–4
(United Kingdom) Omegaland	Lola T94/50	Zytek Judd KV	18	(United States) Elton Julian	6–8
(United Kingdom) Omegaland	Lola T92/50	Zytek Judd KV	19	(Canada) Robbie Stirling	1
(United Kingdom) Omegaland	Lola T94/50	Zytek Judd KV	19	(Italy) Patrick Crinelli	2–3
(United Kingdom) Omegaland	Lola T94/50	Zytek Judd KV	19	(Brazil) Norio Matsubara	4
(United Kingdom) Omegaland	Lola T94/50	Zytek Judd KV	19	(France) Marc Rostan	7–8
(United Kingdom) Nordic Racing	Lola T94/50	Ford Cosworth AC	20	(Belgium) Marc Goossens	All
(United Kingdom) Nordic Racing	Lola T94/50	Ford Cosworth AC	21	(Spain) Jordi Gené	1–3
(United Kingdom) Nordic Racing	Lola T94/50	Ford Cosworth AC	21	(United Kingdom) Oliver Gavin	5
(United Kingdom) Nordic Racing	Lola T94/50	Ford Cosworth AC	21	(Brazil) Paolo Carcasci	7
(France) Danielson	Reynard 94D	Ford Cosworth DFV; Zytek Judd KV	24	(France) Nicolas Leboissetier	All
(France) Danielson	Reynard 94D	Ford Cosworth DFV; Zytek Judd KV	36	(France) Jérôme Policand	All
(United Kingdom) Madgwick International	Reynard 94D	Zytek Judd KV	26	(Belgium) Mikke Van Hool	All
(United Kingdom) Madgwick International	Reynard 94D	Zytek Judd KV	27	(Sweden) Kenny Bräck	All
(Italy) Durango Equipe	Reynard 93D	Ford Cosworth AC	30	(Italy) Severino Nardozzi	All
(Italy) Durango Equipe	Reynard 93D	Ford Cosworth AC	31	(Italy) Christian Pescatori	All
(United Kingdom) Super Nova Racing	Reynard 94D	Ford Cosworth AC	32	(Italy) Vincenzo Sospiri	All
(United Kingdom) Super Nova Racing	Reynard 94D	Ford Cosworth AC	33	(Japan) Taki Inoue	All
(Belgium) Racing Wim Eyckmans	Reynard 93D	Ford Cosworth AC	35	(Belgium) Wim Eyckmans	1, 3
(Belgium) Racing Wim Eyckmans	Reynard 94D	Ford Cosworth AC	35	(Belgium) Wim Eyckmans	5–8

== Calendar ==
Four F3000 races (Spain, Germany, Belgium and Portugal) were held in Formula One Grand Prix weekends, the highest number in the championship's history so far.

Round	Circuit	Date	Laps	Distance	Time	Speed	Pole position	Fastest lap	Winner
1	(United Kingdom) Silverstone Circuit	2 May	38	5.226=198.588 km	1'01:56.79	192.33 km/h	(France) Franck Lagorce	(France) Franck Lagorce	(France) Franck Lagorce
2	(France) Pau Grand Prix	23 May	71	2.76=195.96 km	1'25:39.269	137.267 km/h	(Brazil) Gil de Ferran	(Italy) Vincenzo Sospiri	(Brazil) Gil de Ferran
3	(Spain) Circuit de Catalunya	28 May	41	4.747=194.627 km	1'05:41.000	177.768 km/h	(Italy) Massimiliano Papis	(France) Jean-Christophe Boullion	(Italy) Massimiliano Papis
4	(Italy) Autodromo di Pergusa	17 July	40	4.95=198.00 km	0'51:41.731	205.908 km/h	(France) Franck Lagorce	(Italy) Christian Pescatori	(Brazil) Gil de Ferran
5	(Germany) Hockenheimring	30 July	29	6.815=197.635 km	0'58:07.686	204.238 km/h	(France) Guillaume Gomez	(France) Franck Lagorce	(France) Franck Lagorce
6	(Belgium) Circuit de Spa-Francorchamps	27 August	27	7.001=189.027 km	1'11:34.525	156.456 km/h	(France) Franck Lagorce	(Brazil) Tarso Marques	(France) Jean-Christophe Boullion
7	(Portugal) Autódromo do Estoril	25 September	44	4.36=191.84 km	1'08:11.419	168.798 km/h	(France) Emmanuel Clérico	(France) Emmanuel Clérico	(France) Jean-Christophe Boullion
8	(France) Circuit de Nevers Magny-Cours	2 October	48	4.25=204.000 km	1'10:41.298	173.154 km/h	(France) Franck Lagorce	(France) Franck Lagorce	(France) Jean-Christophe Boullion

== Drivers' Championship ==
Pos	Driver	SIL (United Kingdom)	PAU (France)	CAT (Spain)	PER (Italy)	HOC (Germany)	SPA (Belgium)	EST (Portugal)	MAG (France)	Points
1	(France) Jean-Christophe Boullion	8	4	Ret	14	2	1	1	1	36
2	(France) Franck Lagorce	**1**	5	5	**2**	1	**13**	8	**2**	34
3	(Brazil) Gil de Ferran	3	**1**	Ret	1	3	5	Ret	Ret	28
4	(Italy) Vincenzo Sospiri	4	2	3	Ret	4	Ret	2	5	24
5	(Italy) Massimiliano Papis	7	Ret	**1**	4	Ret	11	13	6	13
6	(France) Didier Cottaz	6	3	7	9	11	2	5	7	13
7	(France) Guillaume Gomez	11	6	8	10	**Ret**	4	3	3	12
8	(Italy) Fabrizio De Simone	16	10	2	Ret	14	6	Ret	Ret	7
9	(United Kingdom) David Coulthard	2								6
10	(Japan) Hideki Noda	5	Ret	Ret	3	Ret	7	16	11	6
11	(Sweden) Kenny Bräck	12	DNS	11	11	9	3	6	10	5
12	(Brazil) Tarso Marques	13	Ret	DNS	12	10	8	12	4	3
13	(Spain) Jordi Gené	9	9	4						3
14	(Brazil) Pedro Diniz	Ret	Ret	10	Ret	Ret	9	4	Ret	3
15	(Belgium) Marc Goossens	Ret	Ret	6	7	5	Ret	Ret	Ret	3
16	(France) Jérôme Policand	14	8	Ret	5	7	12	17	Ret	2
17	(Italy) Christian Pescatori	NC	7	9	6	8	10	Ret	9	1
18	(Belgium) Wim Eyckmans	Ret		Ret		6	17	Ret	Ret	1
19	(France) Emmanuel Clérico	Ret	Ret	Ret	Ret	15	Ret	**7**	Ret	0
20	(Italy) Paolo Delle Piane	Ret	DNS	Ret	8	Ret	Ret	Ret	8	0
21	(Japan) Taki Inoue	15	Ret	13	13	12	14	9	Ret	0
22	(France) Nicolas Leboissetier	Ret	Ret		Ret	Ret	Ret	10	12	0
23	(United Kingdom) Oliver Gavin	10	DNQ	Ret	Ret	DNS				0
24	(Belgium) Mikke Van Hool	DNS	Ret	12	Ret	13	Ret	11	Ret	0
25	(United States) Elton Julian						15	14	13	0
26	(France) Marc Rostan							Ret	14	0
27	(United Kingdom) James Taylor				15	Ret	Ret	15	Ret	0
28	(Italy) Severino Nardozzi	17	DNQ	Ret	DNQ	16	16	Ret	15	0
	(Italy) Patrick Crinelli		Ret	Ret						
	(Canada) Robbie Stirling	Ret								
	(United Kingdom) Allan McNish		Ret							
	(Brazil) Norio Matsubara				Ret					
	(Brazil) Paulo Carcasci							Ret		
Pos	Driver	SIL (United Kingdom)	PAU (France)	CAT (Spain)	PER (Italy)	HOC (Germany)	SPA (Belgium)	EST (Portugal)	MAG (France)	Points

Colour	Result
Gold	Winner
Silver	Second place
Bronze	Third place
Green	Points classification
Blue	Non-points classification
Blue	Non-classified finish (NC)
Purple	Retired, not classified (Ret)
Red	Did not qualify (DNQ)
Red	Did not pre-qualify (DNPQ)
Black	Disqualified (DSQ)
White	Did not start (DNS)
White	Withdrew (WD)
White	Race cancelled (C)
Blank	Did not practice (DNP)
Blank	Did not arrive (DNA)
Blank	Excluded (EX)

**Bold** — Pole
Italics — Fastest lap

=== Notes ===
- Drivers who did not finish the race but were classified are marked with .

== Complete overview ==
first column of every race	10	= grid position

second column of every race	10	= race result

R16=retired, but classified NC=not classified R=retired NS=did not start NQ=did not qualify (21)=place after practice, but grid position not held free 9P=grid position, but started from pit lane

Place	Name	Team	Chassis	Engine	SIL (United Kingdom)		PAU (France)		CAT (Spain)		PER (Italy)		HOC (Germany)		SPA (Belgium)		EST (Portugal)		MAG (France)
1	(France) Jean-Christophe Boullion	DAMS	Reynard	Ford Cosworth	5	8	5	4	2	R	13	14	4	2	2	1	3	1	2	1
2	(France) Franck Lagorce	Apomatox	Reynard	Ford Cosworth	1	1	3	5	16	5	1	2	3	1	1	13	6	8	1	2
3	(Brazil) Gil de Ferran	Paul Stewart Racing	Reynard	Zytek Judd	2	3	1	1	18	R	2	1	2	3	7	5	2	R	11	R
4	(Italy) Vincenzo Sospiri	SuperNova Racing	Reynard	Ford Cosworth	8	4	2	2	6	3	4	R	20	4	10	R	8	2	16	5
5	(France) Didier Cottaz	Paul Stewart Racing	Reynard	Zytek Judd	10	6	4	3	15	7	16	9	7	11	8	2	15	5	12	7
6	(Italy) Massimiliano Papis	Mythos Racing	Reynard	Judd	11	7	6	R	1	1	11	4	8	R	12	11	18	13	8	6
7	(France) Guillaume Gomez	DAMS	Reynard	Ford Cosworth	16	11	10	6	20	8	14	10	1	R	11	4	4	3	6	3
8	(Italy) Fabrizio De Simone	Mythos Racing	Reynard	Judd	9	16	17	10	3	2	7	R	12	14	3	6	5	R	7	R
9	(United Kingdom) David Coulthard	Vortex European	Reynard	Ford Cosworth	3	2	-	-	-	-	-	-	-	-	-	-	-	-	-	-
	(Japan) Hideki Noda	Forti Corse	Reynard	Ford Cosworth	4	5	16	R	5	R	6	3	5	R	19	7	11	R16	15	11
11	(Sweden) Kenny Bräck	Madgwick International	Reynard	Zytek Judd	17	12	(21)	NS	14	11	15	11	17	9	5	3	7	6	10	10
12	(Spain) Jordi Gené	Nordic Racing	Lola	Zytek Judd	13	9	9	9	9	4	-	-	-	-	-	-	-	-	-	-
	(Belgium) Marc Goossens	Nordic Racing	Lola	Zytek Judd	15	R	20	R	11	6	9P	7	14	5	13	R	19	R	19	R
	(Brazil) Pedro Diniz	Forti Corse	Reynard	Ford Cosworth	6	R	11	R	7	10	5	R	13	R	4	9	10	4	21	R
	(Brazil) Tarso Marques	Vortex Motorsport	Reynard	Ford Cosworth	19	13	15	R	12	NS	12	12	16	10	16	8	14	12	5	4
16	(France) Jérôme Policand	Danielson	Reynard	Zytek Judd	18	14	12	8	10	R	10	5	10	7	18	12	16	17	14	R
17	(Italy) Christian Pescatori	Durango	Reynard	Ford Cosworth	23	NC	13	7	13	9	8	6	15	8	14	10	13	R	13	9
	(Belgium) Wim Eyckmans	Eyckmans Racing	Reynard	Ford Cosworth	20	R	-	-	21	R	-	-	9	6	9	17	12	R	4	R
-	(France) Emmanuel Clérico	Apomatox	Reynard	Ford Cosworth	7	R	8	R	4	R	3	R	6	15	6	R	1	7	3	R
-	(Italy) Paolo Delle Piane	Vortex Motorsport	Reynard	Ford Cosworth	12	R	18	NS	17	R
-	(Italy) Paolo Delle Piane	Auto Sport Racing	Reynard	Ford Cosworth							17P	8	18	R	20	R	22	R	9	8
-	(Japan) Taki Inoue	SuperNova Racing	Reynard	Ford Cosworth	21	15	21	R	19	13	19	13	21	12	15	14	17	9	20	R
-	(France) Nicolas Leboissetier	Danielson	Reynard	Zytek Judd	22	R	14	R	-	-	21	R	11	R	17	R
-	(France) Nicolas Leboissetier	Danielson	Reynard	Ford Cosworth													9	10	17	12
-	(United Kingdom) Oliver Gavin	Omegaland	Lola	Zytek Judd	14	10	24	NQ	8	R	18	R
-	(United Kingdom) Oliver Gavin	Nordic Racing	Lola	Zytek Judd									19	NS	-	-	-	-	-	-
-	(Belgium) Mikke Van Hool	Madgwick International	Reynard	Zytek Judd	(24)	NS	22	R	23	12	20	R	22	13	21	R	21	11	18	R
-	(United States) Elton Julian	Omegaland	Lola	Zytek Judd	-	-	-	-	-	-	-	-	-	-	22	15	24	14	22	13
-	(France) Marc Rostan	Omegaland	Lola	Zytek Judd	-	-	-	-	-	-	-	-	-	-	-	-	25	R	23	14
-	(United Kingdom) James Taylor	Vortex Motorsport	Reynard	Ford Cosworth	-	-	-	-	-	-	22	15	23	R	23	R	23	15	25	R
-	(Italy) Severino Nardozzi	Durango	Reynard	Ford Cosworth	25	17	25	NQ	24	R	24	NQ	24	16	24	16	26	R	24	15
-	(Italy) Patrick Crinelli	Omegaland	Lola	Zytek Judd	-	-	19	R	22	R	-	-	-	-	-	-	-	-	-	-
-	(Canada) Robbie Stirling	Omegaland	Lola	Zytek Judd	24	R	-	-	-	-	-	-	-	-	-	-	-	-	-	-
-	(United Kingdom) Allan McNish	Vortex European	Reynard	Ford Cosworth	-	-	7	R	-	-	-	-	-	-	-	-	-	-	-	-
-	(Brazil) Norio Matsubara	Omegaland	Lola	Zytek Judd	-	-	-	-	-	-	23	R	-	-	-	-	-	-	-	-
-	(Brazil) Paulo Carcasci	Nordic Racing	Lola	Zytek Judd	-	-	-	-	-	-	-	-	-	-	-	-	20	R	-	-
