= Derfler =

Derfler is a surname. Notable people with the surname include:

- Gene Derfler (1924–2026), American politician
- Rubén Derfler (born 1976), Argentine racing driver

== See also ==
- Thomas Defler (born 1941), American primatologist based in Colombia
