= 1998 Japanese Touring Car Championship =

1998 touring car championship race

Seasons
- ← 1997 none →

The 1998 Japanese Touring Car Championship was the 14th and final edition of the series. It began at Fuji Speedway on 5 April and finished after seven events, also at Fuji Speedway on 8 November. Masanori Sekiya won the championship for the second time, driving for Toyota Team TOM's.

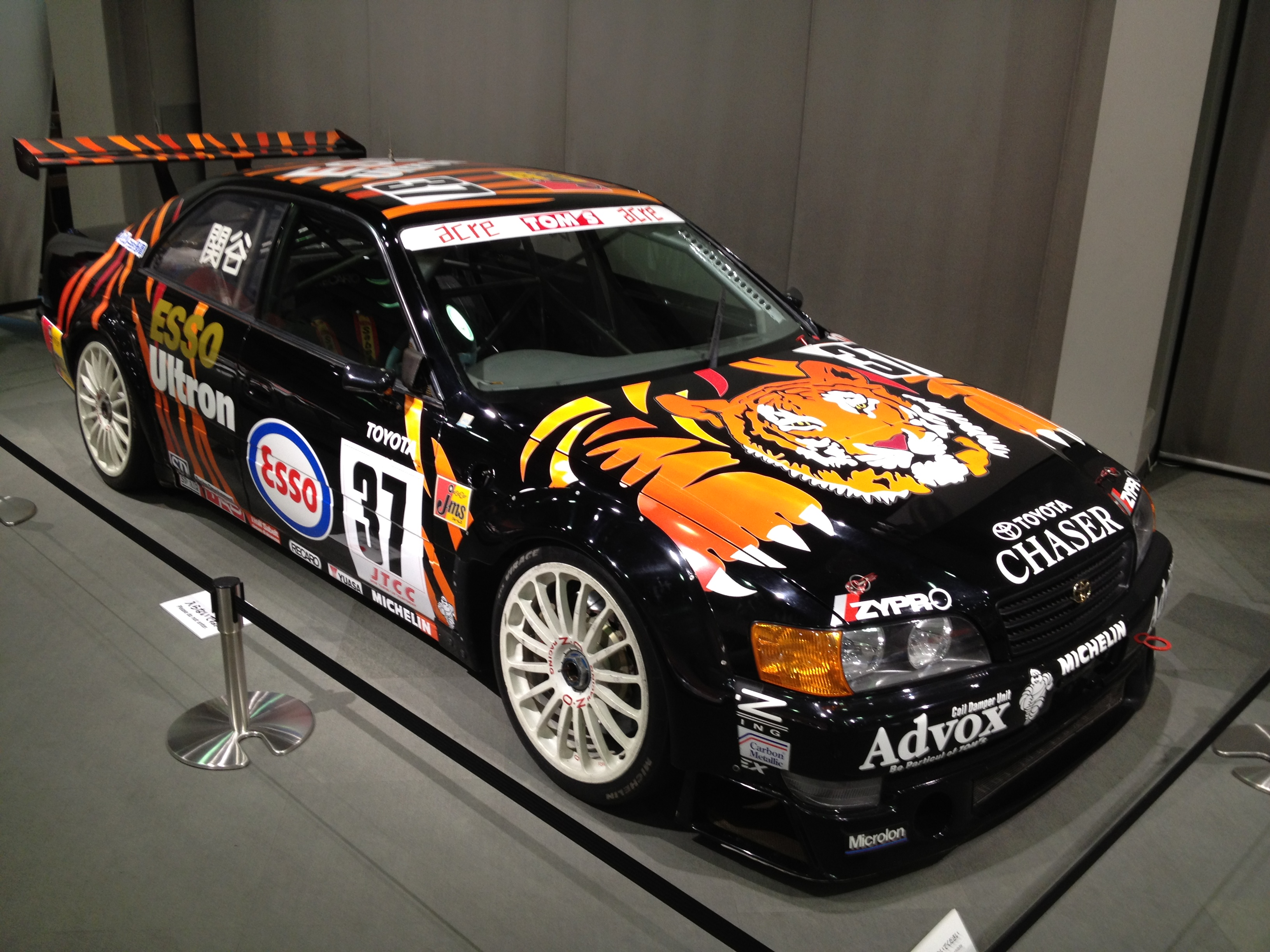
Masanori Sekiya won the championship driving a Toyota Chaser.

== Teams & Drivers ==
| Team | Car | No. | Drivers | Rounds |
|---|---|---|---|---|
| Object T | Toyota Corona EXiV | 11 | (Japan) Tatsuya Tanigawa | 1 |
| Object T | Toyota Corona EXiV | 11 | (Japan) Akihiko Nakaya | 3–7 |
| Racing Project Bandoh | Toyota Corona EXiV | 19 | (Japan) Katsutomo Kaneishi | All |
| Tsuchiya Engineering | Toyota Corona EXiV | 24 | (Japan) Takeshi Tsuchiya | All |
| Tsuchiya Engineering | Toyota Chaser | 25 | (Japan) Keiichi Tsuchiya | All |
| Toyota Team TOM's | Toyota Chaser | 36 | (United Kingdom) Kelvin Burt | All |
| Toyota Team TOM's | Toyota Chaser | 37 | (Japan) Masanori Sekiya | All |
| Toyota Team Cerumo | Toyota Chaser | 38 | (Japan) Yuji Tachikawa | All |
| Toyota Team Cerumo | Toyota Chaser | 39 | (Japan) Hironori Takeuchi | All |
| SYMS Racing | Subaru Impreza Sport Wagon | 66 | (Japan) Hideshi Matsuda | 1 |
| SYMS Racing | Subaru Impreza Sport Wagon | 66 | (Argentina) Sebastián Martino | 2–3 |
| Dandelion Racing | Toyota Corona EXiV | 68 | (Argentina) Rubén Derfler | All |

== Calendar ==
| Round | | Circuit | Date | Pole position | Fastest lap | Winning driver | Winning team | Ref |
|---|---|---|---|---|---|---|---|---|
| 1 | R1 | (Japan) Fuji Speedway, Shizuoka | 5 April | (Japan) Katsutomo Kaneishi | (Japan) Masanori Sekiya | (Japan) Hironori Takeuchi | Toyota Team Cerumo | |
| 1 | R2 | (Japan) Fuji Speedway, Shizuoka | 5 April | | (Japan) Katsutomo Kaneishi | (Japan) Katsutomo Kaneishi | Racing Project Bandoh | |
| 2 | R3 | (Japan) Twin Ring Motegi, Tochigi | 10 May | (Japan) Masanori Sekiya | (Japan) Hironori Takeuchi | (Japan) Masanori Sekiya | Toyota Team TOM's | |
| 3 | R4 | (Japan) Sportsland SUGO, Miyagi | 24 May | (Japan) Masanori Sekiya | (Japan) Masanori Sekiya | (Japan) Masanori Sekiya | Toyota Team TOM's | |
| 3 | R5 | (Japan) Sportsland SUGO, Miyagi | 24 May | | (United Kingdom) Kelvin Burt | (United Kingdom) Kelvin Burt | Toyota Team TOM's | |
| 4 | R6 | (Japan) Suzuka Circuit, Mie | 21 June | (Japan) Hironori Takeuchi | (Japan) Masanori Sekiya | (Japan) Katsutomo Kaneishi | Racing Project Bandoh | |
| 4 | R7 | (Japan) Suzuka Circuit, Mie | 21 June | | (United Kingdom) Kelvin Burt | (Japan) Masanori Sekiya | Toyota Team TOM's | |
| 5 | R8 | (Japan) Mine Central Circuit, Yamaguchi | 26 July | (Japan) Masanori Sekiya | (Japan) Masanori Sekiya | (Japan) Masanori Sekiya | Toyota Team TOM's | |
| 5 | R9 | (Japan) Mine Central Circuit, Yamaguchi | 26 July | | (Japan) Yuji Tachikawa | (Japan) Masanori Sekiya | Toyota Team TOM's | |
| 6 | R10 | (Japan) TI Circuit Aida, Okayama | 16 August | (Japan) Masanori Sekiya | (Japan) Katsutomo Kaneishi | (Japan) Masanori Sekiya | Toyota Team TOM's | |
| 7 | R11 | (Japan) Fuji Speedway, Shizuoka | 8 November | (Japan) Katsutomo Kaneishi | (Japan) Katsutomo Kaneishi | (Japan) Katsutomo Kaneishi | Racing Project Bandoh | |

== Championship Standings ==
| Pos | Driver | FUJ | | MOT | SUG | | SUZ | | MIN | | AID | FUJ | Pts |
|---|---|---|---|---|---|---|---|---|---|---|---|---|---|
| 1 | (Japan) Masanori Sekiya | 8 | 2 | **1** | **1** | 3 | 4 | 1 | **1** | 1 | **1** | 7 | 128 |
| 2 | (Japan) Katsutomo Kaneishi | **Ret** | 1 | 6 | 3 | Ret | 1 | 2 | 3 | 2 | Ret | **1** | 108 |
| 3 | (Japan) Hironori Takeuchi | 1 | 6 | 4 | 2 | 2 | **3** | 3 | 2 | Ret | 7 | 5 | 100 |
| 4 | (Japan) Yuji Tachikawa | 7 | 3 | 2 | 6 | 4 | 2 | Ret | 5 | 3 | 3 | 4 | 100 |
| 5 | (United Kingdom) Kelvin Burt | 6 | 4 | 5 | 4 | 1 | Ret | Ret | 9 | 4 | 2 | Ret | 86 |
| 6 | (Japan) Takeshi Tsuchiya | 2 | 5 | 3 | Ret | 7 | 5 | 5 | 4 | Ret | 5 | Ret | 78 |
| 7 | (Japan) Keiichi Tsuchiya | 3 | 8 | 7 | 5 | 6 | Ret | 4 | 8 | 5 | 4 | 3 | 63 |
| 8 | (Argentina) Rubén Derfler | 4 | Ret | 8 | Ret | 5 | 6 | Ret | 6 | 6 | 5 | 2 | 62 |
| 9 | (Japan) Akihiko Nakaya | | | | Ret | Ret | Ret | 6 | 7 | Ret | 8 | 6 | 32 |
| 10 | (Japan) Tatsuya Tanigawa | 5 | 7 | | | | | | | | | | 14 |
| 11 | (Japan) Hideshi Matsuda | 9 | 9 | | | | | | | | | | 5 |
| 12 | (Argentina) Sebastián Martino | | | 9 | DNS | DNS | | | | | | | 4 |
| Pos | Driver | FUJ | | MOT | SUG | | SUZ | | MIN | | AID | FUJ | Pts |

| Colour | Result |
|---|---|
| Gold | Winner |
| Silver | Second place |
| Bronze | Third place |
| Green | Points classification |
| Blue | Non-points classification |
| Blue | Non-classified finish (NC) |
| Purple | Retired, not classified (Ret) |
| Red | Did not qualify (DNQ) |
| Red | Did not pre-qualify (DNPQ) |
| Black | Disqualified (DSQ) |
| White | Did not start (DNS) |
| White | Withdrew (WD) |
| White | Race cancelled (C) |
| Blank | Did not practice (DNP) |
| Blank | Did not arrive (DNA) |
| Blank | Excluded (EX) |

**Bold** - Pole
Italics - Fastest lap
