= Kelvin Burt =

British racing driver (born 1967)

- Nationality: (United Kingdom) British
- Born: 7 September 1967 (age 59) Birmingham, England

British Touring Car Championship
- Categorisation: FIA Gold
- Years active: 1990, 1994–1997, 2002, 2004
- Teams: BMW Team Finance; Team Mondeo; Volvo 850 / S40 Racing; Gary Ayles Motorsport
- Starts: 85
- Wins: 2 (2 in class)
- Poles: 0
- Fastest laps: 3
- Best finish: 8th in 1995

Championship titles
- 1993 1991: British Formula Three; Formula Vauxhall Lotus

Kelvin Burt (born 7 September 1967) is a British auto racing driver. After attending the Jim Russell Racing Drivers' School in 1987 he turned to Formula Ford racing, battling hard against David Coulthard for the championship. He won his class in a British Touring Car Championship round at Oulton Park, before spending 1991 winning the Formula Vauxhall Lotus series, and being voted Autosport Club Driver of the Year. He moved up to British F3 in 1992, winning the title with Paul Stewart Racing in 1993 with nine wins, a record for a British driver.

Burt did some Porsche Supercup races in 1994, becoming the only Brit to win a race in that form of the series. He also became the test driver for the Jordan Grand Prix Formula One team midseason, and the Jordan team put a contract option to consider having him race in F1. However, while that did not come to fruition, he did surface again as a test driver for Arrows in 1996.

For 1995, Burt had his first full BTCC season, replacing the retiring Andy Rouse in Rouse's Ford team. He took eighth overall, only two places behind experienced team-mate Paul Radisich. He then spent two years with Tom Walkinshaw's Volvo team, winning a further race. He also did two meetings for GA (then racing as Team Sureterm) in the main class in 2004, scoring 11 points, more than all their other drivers bar Carl Breeze put together.

For 1998, Burt went to Japan, racing successfully in both Touring Cars and GTs, coming fifth overall in the Touring Car series. He raced in Sweden in 2000 before dominating the British GT series' GTO Class in 2001, taking eight wins for Parr Motorsport in a Porsche. He was ASCAR runner-up in 2002. In 2003, he raced in the FIA GT Championship for Team Maranello in a Ferrari, taking two third places. In 2006, he did the Porsche Supercup race at Silverstone, but focused on the lower-level Porsche Cup, whilst forging a punditry career as co-commentator to Martin Haven for British F3. He gained wider attention for a huge crash he has during the Porsche Carrera Cup race at Thruxton, in which his car barrel-rolled after contact with James Sutton and cleared a fence. Burt was not badly hurt, although a marshal was treated for shock. As the Carrera race was part of the BTCC meeting at the track, footage was screened by ITV in their coverage of the series.

== Racing record ==
=== Complete British Touring Car Championship results ===
(key) Races in bold indicate pole position (1 point awarded – 1996–2002 all races, 2004 just for first race, 1990 and 2002 in class) Races in italics indicate fastest lap (1 point awarded – 1990, 2002 and 2004 all races, 1990 and 2002 in class) * signifies that driver lead race for at least one lap (1 point awarded all races – in 2004 only)

Year	Team	Car	Class	1	2	3	4	5	6	7	8	9	10	11	12	13	14	15	16	17	18	19	20	21	22	23	24	25	26	27	28	29	30	Overall Pos	Pts	Class Pos
1990	BMW Team Finance	BMW M3	B	**OUL** ovr:5 cls:1	DON; Ret‡	THR	SIL	OUL	SIL	BRH ovr:5‡ cls:2‡	SNE	BRH	BIR	DON	THR	SIL ovr:12 cls:6																		19th	26	12th
1994	Team Mondeo	Ford Mondeo Ghia		THR	BRH; 1	BRH; 2	SNE	SIL; 1	SIL; 2	OUL	DON; 1	DON; 2	BRH; 1	BRH; 2	SIL	KNO; 1	KNO; 2	OUL	BRH; 1	BRH; 2	SIL; 1; 14	SIL; 2; 11	DON; 1	DON; 2										27th	0	
1995	Valvoline Team Mondeo	Ford Mondeo Ghia		DON; 1 Ret	DON; 2; 13	BRH; 1; 3	BRH; 2; 4	THR; 1 Ret	THR; 2; 3	SIL; 1 Ret	SIL; 2; 7	OUL; 1 DNS	OUL; 2; 6	BRH; 1 Ret	BRH; 2; 14	DON; 1; 9	DON; 2; 3	SIL; 5	KNO; 1; 3	KNO; 2 Ret	BRH; 1; 13	BRH; 2; 11	SNE; 1; 1	SNE; 2; 12	OUL; 1; 10	OUL; 2; 7	SIL; 1; 4	SIL; 2 Ret						8th	117	
1996	Volvo 850 Racing	Volvo 850 20v		DON; 1; 4	DON; 2; 5	BRH; 1 Ret	BRH; 2 Ret	THR; 1 DSQ	THR; 2; 13	SIL; 1; 1	SIL; 2 Ret	OUL; 1; 6	OUL; 2 DNS	SNE; 1	SNE; 2	BRH; 1; 8	BRH; 2; 6	SIL; 1; 7	SIL; 2; 8	KNO; 1 Ret	KNO; 2; 10	OUL; 1; 8	OUL; 2; 8	THR; 1 Ret	THR; 2; 17	DON; 1; 9	DON; 2; 12	BRH; 1; 7	BRH; 2; 7					11th	66	
1997	Volvo S40 Racing	Volvo S40		DON; 1; 3	DON; 2; 9	SIL; 1; 4	SIL; 2 Ret	THR; 1 Ret	THR; 2; 13	BRH; 1; 8	BRH; 2; 8	OUL; 1; 9	OUL; 2 Ret	DON; 1; 8	DON; 2 Ret	CRO; 1; 12	CRO; 2; 12	KNO; 1; 8	KNO; 2; 4	SNE; 1 Ret	SNE; 2; 8	THR; 1 Ret	THR; 2; 16	BRH; 1; 14	BRH; 2; 6	SIL; 1; 5	SIL; 2; 8							10th	60	
2002	Gary Ayles Motorsport	Alfa Romeo 156	P	BRH; 1	BRH; 2	OUL; 1	OUL; 2	THR; 1	THR; 2	**SIL**; **1** ovr:15† cls:3†	**SIL**; **2** ovr:14† cls:1†	MON; 1	MON; 2	CRO; 1	CRO; 2	SNE; 1	SNE; 2	KNO; 1	KNO; 2	BRH; 1	BRH; 2	DON; 1	DON; 2											N/A	0†	NC†
2004	Team Sureterm GA Motorsports	Vauxhall Astra Coupé		THR; 1	THR; 2	THR; 3	BRH; 1	BRH; 2	BRH; 3	SIL; 1; 9	SIL; 2; 4*	SIL; 3 Ret	OUL; 1; 12	OUL; 2 Ret	OUL; 3 Ret	MON; 1	MON; 2	MON; 3	CRO; 1	CRO; 2	CRO; 3	KNO; 1	KNO; 2	KNO; 3	BRH; 1	BRH; 2	BRH; 3	SNE; 1	SNE; 2	SNE; 3	DON; 1	DON; 2	DON; 3	16th	11	

† Not eligible for points

‡ Endurance driver – not eligible for points

=== Complete Japanese Touring Car Championship results ===
(key) (Races in bold indicate pole position) (Races in italics indicate fastest lap)

Year	Team	Car	1	2	3	4	5	6	7	8	9	10	11	DC	Pts
1998	Toyota Team TOM's	Toyota Chaser	FUJ; 1; 6	FUJ; 2; 4	MOT; 5	SUG; 1; 4	SUG; 2; 1	SUZ; 1 Ret	SUZ; 2 Ret	MIN; 1; 9	MIN; 2; 4	AID; 2	FUJ; Ret	5th	86

=== Complete Swedish Touring Car Championship results ===
(key) (Races in bold indicate pole position) (Races in italics indicate fastest lap)

Year	Team	Car	1	2	3	4	5	6	7	8	9	10	11	12	13	14	15	16	DC	Pts
2000	Volvo S40 Racing Team Sweden	Volvo S40	KAR; 1	KAR; 2	KNU; 1	KNU; 2	MAN; 1	MAN; 2	FAL; 1	FAL; 2	AND; 1	AND; 2	ARC; 1	ARC; 2	KAR; 1	KAR; 2	MAN; 1; 10	MAN; 2 Ret	22nd	1

=== Complete British GT Championship results ===
(key) (Races in bold indicate pole position)

Year	Team	Car	Class	1	2	3	4	5	6	7	8	9	10	11	12	13	DC	Points
2001	Parr Motorsport	Porsche 996 GT3-RS	GTO	SIL; 1; 9	SNE; 1; 3	**DON**; **1**; 5	**OUL**; **1**; 4	CRO; 1; 4	ROC; 1; 4	CAS; 1 Ret	BRH; 1; 5	DON; 1; 5	**KNO**; **1**; 2	**THR**; **1**; 3	**BRH**; **1**; 3	**SIL**; **1**; 6	1st	164

=== 24 Hours of Le Mans results ===
Year	Team	Co-Drivers	Car	Class	Laps	Pos.	Class Pos.
2003	(United Kingdom) Veloqx Prodrive Racing	(United Kingdom) Anthony Davidson (United Kingdom) Darren Turner	Ferrari 550-GTS Maranello	GTS	176	DNF	DNF

=== Partial Porsche Supercup results ===
(key) (Races in bold indicate pole position – 2 points awarded 2008 onwards in all races) (Races in italics indicate fastest lap)

Year	Team	Car	1	2	3	4	5	6	7	8	9	10	11	12	DC	Points
2006	MRS-PC Service Team PZM	Porsche 997 GT3	BHR	ITA1	GER1	ESP	MON	GBR; 23†	USA1; 2	USA2; 6	FRA	GER2	HUN	ITA2	NC‡	0‡

† — Did not finish the race, but was classified as he completed over 90% of the race distance.

‡ — Guest driver – Not eligible for points.

=== 24 Hours of Silverstone results ===
Year	Team	Co-Drivers	Car	Car No.	Class	Laps	Pos.	Class Pos.
2010	(United Kingdom) Wessex Vehicles	(United Kingdom) Nigel Mustill (United Kingdom) Phil Bennett (United Kingdom) Rob Huff	Aquila CR1	3	1	178	DNF	DNF

Awards and achievements
Preceded by Warren Hughes	Autosport; British Club Driver of the Year; 1991	Succeeded by Oliver Gavin
Preceded by Tim Harvey	Autosport; National Racing Driver of the Year; 1993	Succeeded by Gabriele Tarquini
Sporting positions
Preceded by Gil de Ferran	British Formula Three Champion; 1993	Succeeded by Jan Magnussen
Preceded by Joachim Winkelhock	Guia Race winner 1995	Succeeded by Frank Biela
Preceded by Mark Sumpter	British GT Championship; GTO class Champion; 2001; With: Marino Franchitti	Succeeded by Jamie Davies
