= Marc Goossens =

Belgian racecar driver

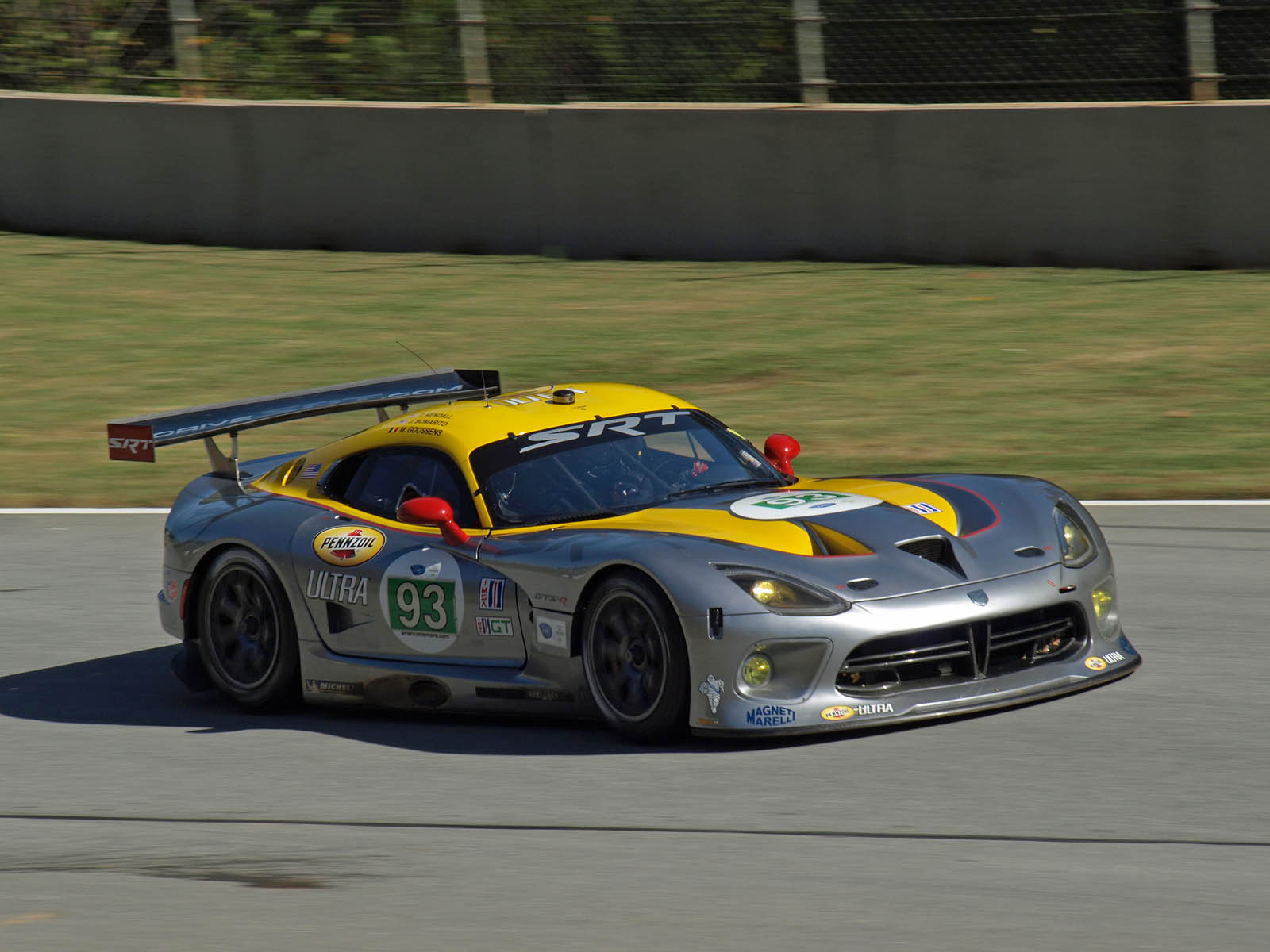
- Goossens in the SRT Motorsports Viper GTS-R in qualifying for the 2012 Petit Le Mans
- Nationality: (Belgium) Belgian
- Born: 30 November 1969 (age 56) Geel, Belgium
- Categorisation: FIA Platinum (until 2015); FIA Gold (2016–2021); FIA Silver (2022–)

24 Hours of Le Mans career
- Years: 1996 – 2003, 2008, 2010 – 2011, 2013, 2016
- Teams: Racing for Belgium/Team Scandia; Courage Compétition; Nissan Motorsports; Team DAMS; Riley & Scott Racing; Creation Autosportif; Jaguar RSR; Prospeed Competition; SRT Motorsports
- Best finish: 4th (1997)
- Class wins: 0

NASCAR Cup Series career
- 2 races run over 2 years
- Best finish: 69th (2007)
- First race: 2006 AMD at The Glen (Watkins Glen)
- Last race: 2007 Toyota/Save Mart 350 (Infineon)
Wins	Top tens	Poles
0	0	0

NASCAR O'Reilly Auto Parts Series career
- 1 race run over 1 year
- Best finish: 99th (2006)
- First race: 2006 Telcel-Motorola 200 (Mexico City)
Wins	Top tens	Poles
0	1	0

NASCAR Whelen Euro Series career
- Debut season: 2016
- Current team: Academy Motorsport
- Car number: 1
- Former teams: Brass Racing, Braxx Racing, DF1 Racing, CAAL Racing, SpeedHouse, Race Planet Team Bleekemolen
- Starts: 90
- Wins: 1
- Poles: 1
- Fastest laps: 3
- Best finish: 5th in 2020, 2024

Marc Goossens (born 30 November 1969), nicknamed "the Goose", is a Belgian professional racing driver that currently competes in the NASCAR Whelen Euro Series, priorly driving the No. 14 Chevrolet Camaro for SpeedHouse in the EuroNASCAR PRO class. He is now driving the No. 56 Chevrolet Camaro for CAAL Racing in the EuroNascar PRO class. He also currently manages 2022 and 2023 World Rally Champion Kalle Rovanperä in his road racing exploits.

== Racing career ==
Goossens drove full-time in Formula 3000 from 1994 to 1996 and part-time from 1999 to 2001. In between, he drove in endurance races and is a veteran of the 24 Hours of Le Mans. From 2002 to 2005 he then raced in FIA GT. In 2007 and 2008, he drove a Riley-Pontiac Daytona Prototype at the Rolex Sports Car Series, scoring two wins with teammate Jim Matthews.

Goossens also finished ninth in his first NASCAR Busch Series start at Autodromo Hermanos Rodriguez in 2006 for Robert Yates Racing in their No. 90 Ford. Goossens returned to Yates later that year to make his NASCAR Cup Series debut in August of that year at Watkins Glen International in the No. 90, but crashed out and finished 43rd. Goossens made another Cup start in 2007 at Infineon Raceway, driving the No. 91 Toyota for Riley-D'Hondt Motorsports. He was running well until a mechanical failure dropped him to 36th. He was set to make another start in the same car at Watkins Glen, but with rain in the forecast for qualifying and the No. 91 only being a part-time team, the team withdrew as they would have missed the race.

Goossens holds the record of the most wins in 24 Hours of Zolder with six (1997, 1998, 2005, 2007, 2014, 2016) race along with Anthony Kumpen. Also, he won the Belcar in 2005 with a Chevrolet Corvette C5R and in 2011 with a Porsche 911 GT 3 R,

Goossens competed at the GTE Pro class of the 2011 Le Mans Series with a ProSpeed Competition Porsche 911, partnering with Marco Holzer.

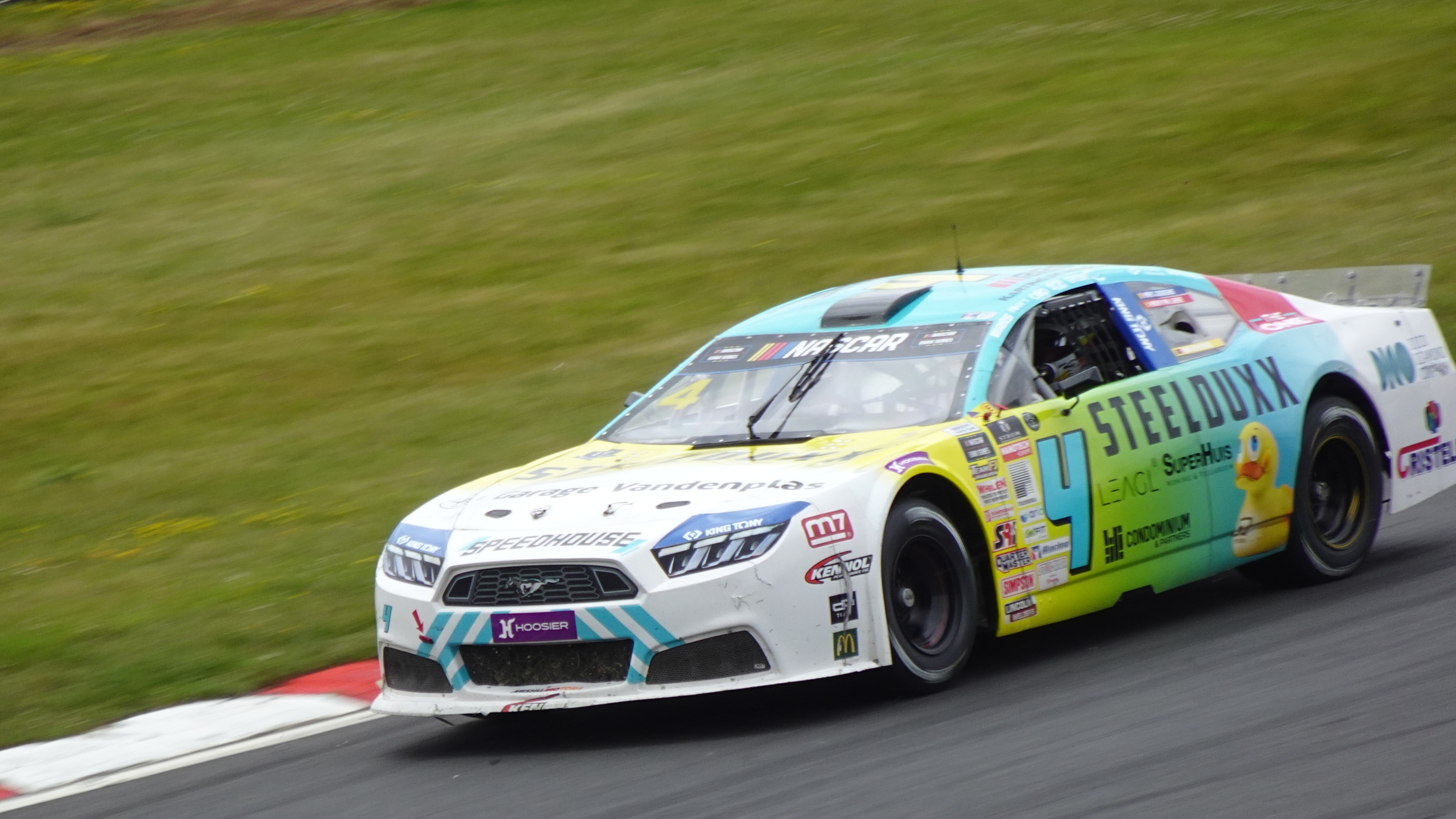
Goossens at Brands Hatch in 2026

In 2012, Goossens was hired by the Chrysler Corporation's SRT Motorsports racing team to drive a Viper GT Le Mans in the American Le Mans Series. With Dominik Farnbacher as teammate in 2013, he scored a class win and three podiums. Continuing with SRT in the 2014 United SportsCar Championship, the Belgian scored six class podiums. In 2015, he continued with Viper but in the GT Daytona class, winning the Six Hours at the Glen. In 2016, he drove a Coyote Corvette Daytona Prototype for VisitFlorida Racing with Ryan Dalziel, finishing third at the 24 Hours of Daytona. He continued with VisitFlorida in the 2017 IMSA SportsCar Championship.

Goossens later competed in the NASCAR Whelen Euro Series, driving for Braxx Racing and CAAL Racing.

== Racing record ==
=== Complete British Formula Three Championship results ===
(key) (Races in bold indicate pole position) (Races in italics indicate fastest lap)

Year	Entrant	Engine	Class	1	2	3	4	5	6	7	8	9	10	11	12	13	14	15	16	DC	Pts
1992	West Surrey Racing	Mugen	A	DON; 17	SIL; 5	THR; 11	BRH; Ret	THR; 8	BRH; 5	SIL; 3	SIL; 7	DON; 18	SNE; 4	SIL; Ret	PEM; 11	SIL; 5	DON; 2	THR; 3	SIL; 4	6th	28
1993	West Surrey Racing	Mugen	A	SIL; 4	**THR**; 1	BRH; 9	DON; 4	BRH; 2	SIL; DSQ	OUL; 2	DON; Ret	SIL; 6	DON; 2	SNE; 2	PEM; 3	SIL; DSQ	SIL; 2	**THR**; Ret		3rd	21

=== Complete International Formula 3000 results ===
(key) (Races in bold indicate pole position) (Races in italics indicate fastest lap)

Year	Entrant	1	2	3	4	5	6	7	8	9	10	11	12	DC	Pts
1994	Nordic Racing	SIL; Ret	PAU; Ret	CAT; 6	PER; 7	HOC; 5	SPA; Ret	EST; Ret	MAG; Ret					12th	3
1995	Nordic Racing	SIL; 4	CAT; 5	PAU; 3	PER; Ret	HOC; 1	SPA; Ret	EST; 8	MAG; 2					3rd	24
1996	Team Astromega	NÜR; Ret	PAU; Ret	**PER**; 1	HOC; Ret	SIL; 16	SPA; 2	**MAG**; 1	EST; 4	MUG; 6	HOC; Ret			3rd	28
1999	Lukoil Arden	IMO; DNQ	MON; DNQ	CAT; Ret	MAG; Ret	SIL; DNQ	A1R; Ret	HOC; Ret	HUN; DSQ	SPA; Ret	NÜR; DNQ			NC	0
2000	Team Astromega	IMO	SIL	CAT	NÜR	MON	MAG	A1R; 10	HOC; 10	HUN; 19	SPA; 2			12th	6
2001	Coloni F3000	INT	IMO	CAT	A1R	MON	NÜR	MAG	SIL	HOC	HUN; Ret	SPA; 5	MNZ; 7	16th	2

=== Complete Formula Nippon results ===
(key) (Races in bold indicate pole position; races in italics indicate fastest lap)

Year	Entrant	1	2	3	4	5	6	7	8	9	10	DC	Pts
1997	Team 5ZIGEN	SUZ; Ret	MIN; Ret	FUJ; Ret	SUZ; Ret	SUG; Ret	FUJ; 10	MIN; Ret	MOT; 10	FUJ; Ret	SUZ; Ret	NC	0
1998	Team 5ZIGEN	SUZ; 6	MIN; 4	FUJ; Ret	MOT; Ret	SUZ; 2	SUG; Ret	MIN; 3	FUJ; Ret	SUZ; 4		6th	17

=== Complete JGTC results ===
(key) (Races in bold indicate pole position) (Races in italics indicate fastest lap)

Year	Team	Car	Class	1	2	3	4	5	6	7	DC	Pts
1997	Team 5ZIGEN	Toyota Supra	GT500	SUZ; 6	FUJ; Ret	SEN; 6	FUJ; Ret	MIN; 12	SUG; 1		8th	32
1998	Team 5ZIGEN	Toyota Supra	GT500	SUZ; 4	FUJ; C	SEN; 7	FUJ; Ret	MOT; Ret	MIN; Ret	SUG; Ret	13th	14

=== American Le Mans Series/IMSA SportsCar Championship results ===
(key) (Races in bold indicate pole position; results in italics indicate fastest lap)

Year	Team	Class	Make	Engine	1	2	3	4	5	6	7	8	9	10	11	Pos.	Points	Ref
2008	LG Motorsports	GT2	Chevrolet Corvette C6	Chevrolet 6.0 L V8	SEB; Ret	STP	LBH	UTA	LRP	MDO	ELK	MOS	DET	PET; Ret	LAG	NC	0	
2009	RSR	GT2	Jaguar XKR GT2	Jaguar 5.0L V8	SEB	STP	LBH	UTA	LRP	MOH	ELK	MOS	PET	LAG; Ret		NC	0	
2010	Jaguar RSR	GT	Jaguar XKR GT2	Jaguar 5.0L V8	SEB; Ret	LBH	LAG; Ret	UTA; NC	LRP; 9	MOH; 9	ELK; Ret	MOS; 10	PET; Ret			34th	5	
2012	SRT Motorsports	GT	SRT Viper GTS-R	SRT 8.0 L V10	SEB	LBH	LAG	LRP	MOS	MOH; 12	ELK; Ret	BAL; 12†	VIR	PET; Ret		NC	0	
2013	SRT Motorsports	GT	SRT Viper GTS-R	SRT 8.0 L V10	SEB; 5	**LBH**; 3	LAG; 5	LRP; Ret	MOS; 2	ELK; 1	BAL; 5	COA; 5	VIR; 7	PET; 7		5th	101	
2014	SRT Motorsports	GTLM	SRT Viper GTS-R	Dodge 8.0L V10	DAY; 3	SEB; 7	LBH; 7	LGA; 6	WGL; 2	MOS; 3	IMS; 8	ELK; 4	VIR; 6	COA; 2	PET; 3	4th	314	
2015	Riley Motorsports	GTD	Dodge Viper GT3-R	Dodge 8.3 L V10	DAY; 9	SEB; 4	LGA	BEL	WGL; 1	LIM	ELK	VIR	COA; 7	ATL; 3		12th	144	
2016	VisitFlorida Racing	P	Coyote Corvette DP	Chevrolet 5.5L V8	DAY; 3	SEB; 5	LBH; 6	LGA; 2	BEL; 7	WGL; 6	MOS; 4	ELK; 6	COA; 7	PET; 7		5th	273	
2017	VisitFlorida Racing	P	Riley Mk. 30	Gibson GK428 4.2 L V8	DAY; 3	SEB; 6	LBH; WD	AUS; 7	DET; 9	WGL; 5	MOS; 10					7th	233	
2017	VisitFlorida Racing	P	Ligier JS P217	Gibson GK428 4.2 L V8								ELK; 5	LGA; 1	PET; 7		7th	233	

^{†} Did not finish the race but was classified as his car completed more than 70% of the overall winner's race distance.

=== 24 Hours of Le Mans results ===
Year	Team	Co-Drivers	Car	Class	Laps	Pos.	Class Pos.
1996	Racing for Belgium; Team Scandia	(Belgium) Eric van de Poele (Belgium) Éric Bachelart	Ferrari 333 SP	WSC	208	DNF	DNF
1997	(France) Courage Compétition	(France) Didier Cottaz (France) Jérôme Policand	Courage C41-Porsche	LMP	336	4th	**2nd**
1998	(France) Courage Compétition	(France) Didier Cottaz (France) Jean-Philippe Belloc	Courage C51-Nissan	LMP	232	DNF	DNF
1999	(Japan) Nissan Motorsports	(France) Didier Cottaz (Sweden) Fredrik Ekblom	Courage C52-Nissan	LMP	335	8th	7th
2000	(France) Team DAMS	(France) Christophe Tinseau (Denmark) Kristian Kolby	Cadillac Northstar LMP	LMP900	4	DNF	DNF
2001	(France) DAMS	(France) Éric Bernard (France) Emmanuel Collard	Cadillac Northstar LMP01	LMP900	56	DNF	DNF
2002	(United States) Riley & Scott Racing	(United States) Jim Matthews (Belgium) Didier Theys	Riley & Scott Mk III C-Élan	LMP900	189	DNF	DNF
2003	(United States) Riley & Scott Racing	(United States) Jim Matthews (France) Christophe Tinseau	Riley & Scott Mk III C-Ford	LMP900	214	DNF	DNF
2008	(United Kingdom) Creation Autosportif	(United Kingdom) Stuart Hall (United Kingdom) Johnny Mowlem	Creation CA07-AIM	LMP1	316	24th	11th
2010	(United States) Jaguar RSR	(United States) Paul Gentilozzi (United Kingdom) Ryan Dalziel	Jaguar XKR GT2	GT2	4	DNF	DNF
2011	(Belgium) Prospeed Competition	(Germany) Marco Holzer (Netherlands) Jaap van Lagen	Porsche 997 GT3-RSR	GTE; Pro	293	23rd	8th
2013	(United States) SRT Motorsports	(United Kingdom) Ryan Dalziel (Germany) Dominik Farnbacher	SRT Viper GTS-R	GTE; Pro	306	24th	8th
2016	(Republic of Ireland) Murphy Prototypes	(Netherlands) Jeroen Bleekemolen (United States) Ben Keating	Oreca 03R-Nissan	LMP2	323	34th	15th

=== 24 Hours of Spa results ===
Year	Team	Co-Drivers	Car	Class	Laps	Pos.	Class Pos.
1996	(Belgium) Castrol Juma Racing	(Belgium) Stéphane De Groodt (Belgium) Jean-Michel Martin	BMW 325i	EcoTech		DQ	DQ
2002	(Netherlands) Zwaans Racing	(Netherlands) Arjan van der Zwaan (Netherlands) Rob van der Zwaan	Chrysler Viper GTS-R	NAT	80	DNF	DNF
2003	(Netherlands) Zwaans Racing	(Germany) Klaus Abbelen (Netherlands) Arjan van der Zwaan (Netherlands) Rob van der Zwaan	Chrysler Viper GTS-R	GT	17	DNF	DNF
2004	(Belgium) Renstal Excelsior	(France) Eric Cayrolle (Belgium) Anthony Kumpen (France) Yvan Lebon	Chevrolet Corvette C5-R	G2	295	DNF	DNF
2005	(United Kingdom) Aston Martin Racing	(Netherlands) Peter Kox (Portugal) Pedro Lamy	Aston Martin DBR9	GT1	557	5th	5th
2006	(Belgium) Ice Pol Racing Team	(Belgium) Marc Duez (Belgium) Yves Lambert (Belgium) Christian Lefort	Porsche 996 GT3-RSR	GT2	512	16th	7th
2010	(Belgium) Prospeed Competition	(Germany) Marco Holzer (Germany) Marc Lieb (United Kingdom) Richard Westbrook	Porsche 997 GT3-RSR	GT2	207	DNF	DNF
2011	(Belgium) Prospeed Competition	(Belgium) Jan Heylen (Belgium) Maxime Soulet	Porsche 997 GT3-R	Pro	331	DNF	DNF
2012	(Belgium) Prospeed Competition	(Germany) Marc Hennerici (Netherlands) Xavier Maassen	Porsche 997 GT3-R	Pro	471	20th	7th

=== 24 Hours of Zolder results ===
Year	Team	Co-Drivers	Car	Class	Laps	Pos.	Class Pos.
1997	(Belgium) Geert van de Venne	(Netherlands) Patrick Huisman (Belgium) Vincent Vosse	Porsche 911 RSR	GT	710	1st	1st
1998	(Belgium) Geert van de Venne	(Belgium) Thierry Boutsen (Netherlands) Patrick Huisman	Porsche 911 RSR	GT1	691	1st	1st
1999	(Belgium) RTM Racing	(Belgium) Kurt Dujardyn (Belgium) Philip Verellen	Porsche 996 GT3 Cup	GT2	299	DNF	DNF
2000	(Belgium) PSI Motorsport	(Finland) Markus Palttala (Belgium) Philippe Tollenaire	Porsche 996 Biturbo	GTA		DNF	DNF
2001	(Belgium) RTM Racing	(Belgium) Kurt Dujardyn (Belgium) Rudi Penders	Porsche 996 GT3-R	GTB	756	4th	2nd
2002	(Belgium) RTM Racing	(Belgium) Kurt Dujardyn (Belgium) Rudi Penders	Porsche 996 GT3-RS	GTB	759	3rd	1st
2003	(Belgium) RTM Racing	(Belgium) Kurt Dujardyn (Belgium) Rudi Penders	Porsche 996 GT3-RS	GTB	304	DNF	DNF
2004	(Belgium) Selleslagh Racing Team	(Netherlands) Sebastiaan Bleekemolen (Netherlands) David Hart (Belgium) Franz Lamot	Chevrolet Corvette C5-R	GTA	90	DNF	DNF
2005	(Belgium) Selleslagh Racing Team	(Netherlands) David Hart (Belgium) Jan Heylen (Belgium) Guy Verheyen	Chevrolet Corvette C5-R	GTA	799	1st	1st
2006	(Netherlands) Eurotech Racing	(Netherlands) Cor Euser (Netherlands) Danny Van Dongen	Marcos LM600	Belcar 1	821	2nd	2nd
2007	(Belgium) GPR Racing	(Belgium) Guillaume Dumarey (Belgium) Maxime Soulet (Belgium) Maxime Dumarey	Porsche 997 GT3 Cup	Belcar 1	798	1st	1st
2009	(Belgium) Delahaye Racing Team	(Belgium) Anthony Kumpen (Belgium) Ludovic Sougnez (Belgium) Maxime Soulet	Renault Mégane Trophy	4A		DNF	DNF
2011	(Belgium) Prospeed Competition	(Belgium) David Loix (Finland) Markus Palttala (Belgium) Maxime Soulet	Porsche 996 GT3-RS	GTO+	800	2nd	1st
2012	(Belgium) Prospeed Competition	(Belgium) Frédéric Bouvy (Belgium) Bert Redant (Belgium) Maxime Soulet	Porsche 997 GT3-R	GT-1	855	2nd	2nd
2015	Belgium Racing	(Belgium) Dylan Derdaele (Germany) Kenneth Heyer (Netherlands) Peter Hoevenaars	Porsche 991 GT3 Cup	GT-1	796	1st	1st
2016	Belgium Racing	(Belgium) Dylan Derdaele (Germany) Kenneth Heyer (Netherlands) Peter Hoevenaars (Belgium) Yannick Hoogaars	Porsche 991 GT3 Cup	Belcar 1	754	1st	1st
2017	Belgium Racing	(Belgium) Dylan Derdaele (Germany) Kenneth Heyer (Netherlands) Peter Hoevenaars (Belgium) Louis Machiels	Porsche 991 GT3 Cup	Belcar 7	774	7th	2nd
2018	(Belgium) Aqua Protect Racing Team	(Belgium) François Bouillon (Belgium) Kris Cools (Belgium) David Houthoofd (Belgium) Frédéric Vervisch	Norma M20-FC	Belcar 2	796	**3rd**	1st
2018	(Belgium) Braxx Racing	(Belgium) Johan Caeldries (Belgium) Diederik Ceyssens (Belgium) Pierre-Yves Rosoux (Belgium) Kris Van Kelst (Belgium) Sven Van Laere	Chevrolet Camaro TA2	Belcar 1	231	DNF	DNF
2019	Belgium Racing	(Belgium) Dylan Derdaele (Germany) Lars Kern (Belgium) Louis Machiels (Belgium) Nicolas Saelens	Porsche 991 GT3 Cup	Belcar 2	785	2nd	1st
2021	Belgium Racing	(Belgium) Dylan Derdaele (Germany) Kenneth Heyer (Belgium) Nicolas Saelens	Porsche 991 GT3 Cup	GTA	801	7th	2nd
2022	Belgium Racing	(Belgium) Rodrigue Gillion (Belgium) Michiel Haverans (Belgium) Nico Verdonck	Porsche 992 GT3 Cup	GTA	763	3rd	3rd
2023	(Belgium) RedAnt Racing	(Belgium) Michiel Haverans (Germany) Kenneth Heyer (Belgium) Thomas Piessens	Porsche 992 GT3 Cup	GTA	557	32nd	9th

=== NASCAR ===
(key) (Bold – Pole position awarded by qualifying time. Italics – Pole position earned by points standings or practice time. * – Most laps led.)

==== Nextel Cup Series ====
NASCAR Nextel Cup Series results
Year	Team	No.	Make	1	2	3	4	5	6	7	8	9	10	11	12	13	14	15	16	17	18	19	20	21	22	23	24	25	26	27	28	29	30	31	32	33	34	35	36	NNCC	Pts	Ref
2006	Yates Racing	90	Ford	DAY	CAL	LVS	ATL	BRI	MAR	TEX	PHO	TAL	RCH	DAR	CLT	DOV	POC	MCH	SON	DAY	CHI	NHA	POC	IND	GLN; 43	MCH	BRI	CAL	RCH	NHA	DOV	KAN	TAL	CLT	MAR	ATL	TEX	PHO	HOM	75th	34	
2007	Riley-D'Hondt Motorsports	91	Toyota	DAY	CAL	LVS	ATL	BRI	MAR	TEX	PHO	TAL	RCH	DAR	CLT	DOV	POC	MCH	SON; 36	NHA	DAY	CHI	IND	POC	GLN; Wth	MCH	BRI	CAL	RCH	NHA	DOV	KAN	TAL	CLT	MAR	ATL	TEX	PHO	HOM	69th	55	

==== Busch Series ====
NASCAR Busch Series results
Year	Team	No.	Make	1	2	3	4	5	6	7	8	9	10	11	12	13	14	15	16	17	18	19	20	21	22	23	24	25	26	27	28	29	30	31	32	33	34	35	NBSC	Pts	Ref
2006	Yates Racing	90	Ford	DAY	CAL	MXC; 9	LVS	ATL	BRI	TEX	NSH	PHO	TAL	RCH	DAR	CLT	DOV	NSH	KEN	MLW	DAY	CHI	NHA	MAR	GTY	IRP	GLN	MCH	BRI	CAL	RCH	DOV	KAN	CLT	MEM	TEX	PHO	HOM	99th	143	

==== Euro Series – EuroNASCAR PRO ====
(key) (Bold – Pole position. Italics – Fastest lap. * – Most laps led. ^ – Most positions gained)

NASCAR Euro Series – EuroNASCAR PRO results
Year	Team	No.	Make	1	2	3	4	5	6	7	8	9	10	11	12	13	NES	Points	Ref
2016	Brass Racing	90	Ford	VAL; 9	VAL; 20	VEN; 13	VEN; 8	BRH; 4	BRH; 3	TOU; DNS	TOU; DNS	ADR	ADR	ZOL; 21	ZOL; 2		17th	343	
2017	Braxx Racing	90	Ford	VAL	VAL	BRH; 4	BRH; 3	VEN; 13	VEN; 7	HOC	HOC	FRA; 3	FRA; 2	ZOL; 2	ZOL; 1*		10th	491	
2018	Braxx Racing	90	Ford	VAL; 8	**VAL**; 28	FRA; 19	FRA; 2*	BRH; 17	BRH; 2	TOU; 19	TOU; DNS	HOC; 2	HOC; DNS	ZOL; 11	ZOL; 27		19th	293	
2019	Braxx Racing	78	Ford	VAL; 11	VAL; 13	FRA; 2	FRA; 21	BRH; 4	BRH; 19	MOS	MOS	VEN	HOC	HOC	ZOL; 2	ZOL; 3	20th	290	
2020	CAAL Racing	98	Ford	ITA; 22	ITA; 11^	BEL; 2	BEL; 3	CRO; 7	CRO; 5	ESP; 4	ESP; 7	ESP; 5	ESP; 17				5th	352	
2021	DF1 Racing	77	Chevy	ESP; 9	ESP; 10	GBR; 11	GBR; 16	CZE; 3^	CZE; 11	CRO; 8	CRO; 7						14th	248	
2021	CAAL Racing	56	Ford									BEL; 3	BEL; 2	ITA	ITA		14th	248	
2022	SpeedHouse	14	Chevy	ESP; 22	ESP; 6	GBR; 10	GBR; DNS	ITA; 20	ITA; 24	CZE; 23	CZE; 22	BEL; 15	BEL; 21	CRO; 10	CRO; 6		16th	273	
2023	CAAL Racing	56	Chevy	ESP; 8	ESP; 3	GBR; 11	GBR; 11	ITA; 8	ITA; 10	CZE	CZE	GER; 3	GER; 7	BEL; DNS	BEL; DNS		16th	262	
2024	Race Planet Team Bleekemolen	72	Toyota	ESP; 4	ESP; 4	ITA; 7	ITA; 9	GBR	GBR	NED; 8	CZE; 3	CZE; 3	GER; 5	GER; 10	BEL; 3	BEL; 3	5th	475	
2025	Academy Motorsport	1	Ford	ESP; 16	ESP; 12	ITA; 12	ITA; 17	GBR	GBR	CZE	CZE	GER	GER	BEL; 9	BEL; 16		19th	193	

Sporting positions
Preceded by Michael Vergers	British Formula Ford Championship; Champion; 1991	Succeeded by Jamie Spence
Preceded by Dave Coyne	Formula Ford Festival; Winner; 1991	Succeeded by Jan Magnussen
