= 1992 British Formula Three Championship =

1992 British Formula 3 International Series

Seasons
- ← 1991 1993 →

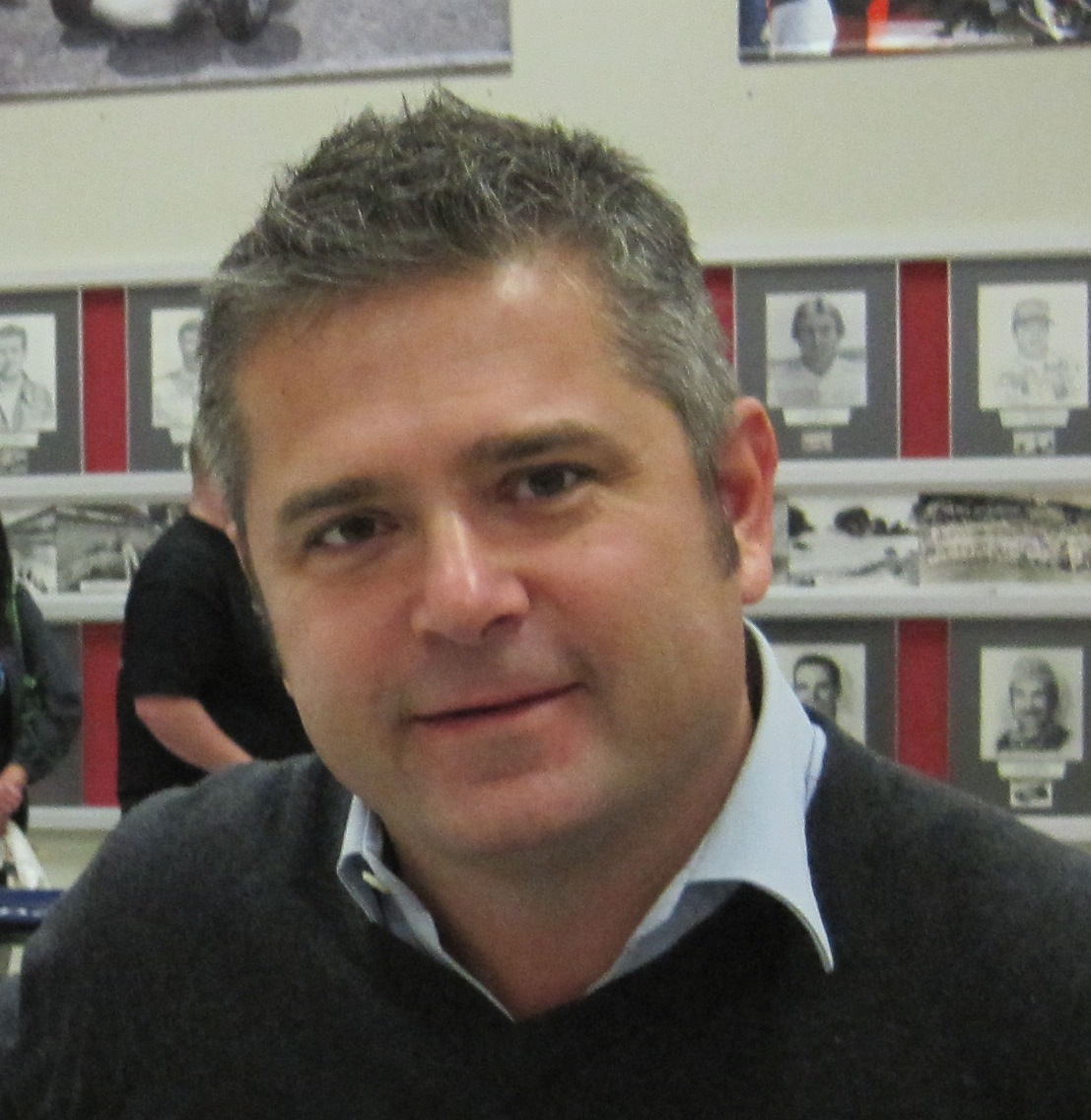
1992 champion, Gil de Ferran

The 1992 British Formula Three season was the 42nd British Formula Three Championship, won by Brazilian Gil de Ferran. The season started on 22 March at Donington Park and ended on 4 October at Silverstone following sixteen races. Dutch driver Marcel Albers died following a large crash during the third round at Thruxton. 1992 was the final season of British F3 in which the champion did not drive a Dallara chassis, and the first of six titles in seven years for Paul Stewart Racing. Class B was won by British driver Paul Evans.

The scoring system was 9-6-4-3-2-1 points awarded to the first six finishers, with 1 (one) extra point added to the driver who set the fastest lap of the race. The best 13 results counted for the driver's final tally.

== Drivers and Teams ==
The following teams and drivers were competitors in the 1992 season. Class B is for older Formula Three cars.

Team	Chassis	Engine	No	Driver	Rounds
Class A
West Surrey Racing	Reynard 923	Mugen-Honda	1	(Belgium) Marc Goossens	All
West Surrey Racing	Reynard 923	Mugen-Honda	2	(Brazil) Oswaldo Negri	All
Bowman Racing	Reynard 923	Mugen-Honda	3	(Belgium) Philippe Adams	1-5
Paul Stewart Racing	Reynard 923	Mugen-Honda	5	(Brazil) Gil de Ferran	All
Paul Stewart Racing	Reynard 923	Mugen-Honda	6	(Brazil) André Ribeiro	All
Alan Docking Racing	Ralt RT36	Mugen-Honda	7	(Netherlands) Marcel Albers	1-3
Alan Docking Racing	Ralt RT36	Mugen-Honda	7	(United Kingdom) Scott Lakin	13-16
Alan Docking Racing	Ralt RT36	Mugen-Honda	7	(United States) Elton Julian	6-11
Alan Docking Racing	Ralt RT36	Mugen-Honda	8	(United States) Elton Julian	1-5
Alan Docking Racing	Ralt RT36	Mugen-Honda	8	(Belgium) Philippe Adams	6-16
Edenbridge Racing	Reynard 923	Mugen-Honda	9	(Brazil) Pedro Diniz	1-8
Edenbridge Racing	Ralt RT36	Mugen-Honda	9	(Brazil) Pedro Diniz	9-16
Edenbridge Racing	Reynard 923	Swindon-Vauxhall	10	(United Kingdom) Warren Hughes	1-7
Edenbridge Racing	Reynard 923	Mugen-Honda	10	(United Kingdom) Warren Hughes	8
Edenbridge Racing	Ralt RT36	Mugen-Honda	10	(United Kingdom) Warren Hughes	9-11
Edenbridge Racing	Ralt RT36	Spiess-Vauxhall	10	(United Kingdom) Warren Hughes	12-16
P1 Racing	Van Diemen RF92	Mugen-Honda	11	(United Kingdom) Jason Plato	1-8
P1 Racing	Van Diemen RF92	Mugen-Honda	11	(United Kingdom) Julian Westwood	9-16
P1 Racing	Reynard 923	Mugen-Honda	12	(Belgium) Mikke van Hool	All
Nomag Racing	Van Diemen RF92	Mugen-Honda	14	(Netherlands) Franc ten Wolde	9-11
Fortec Motorsport	Reynard 923	Mugen-Honda	14	(United States) Elton Julian	14-16
Fortec Motorsport	Reynard 923	Mugen-Honda	17	(United Kingdom) Kelvin Burt	All
Class B
Richard Arnold Developments	Ralt RT35	Mugen-Honda	31	(United Kingdom) Steven Arnold	5-16
John Lee Motorsport	Ralt RT32	Toyota	33	(United States) John Lee	1-11, 13-16
Tech-Speed Motorsport	Ralt RT34	Mugen-Honda	36	(United Kingdom) Steven Arnold	1-4
Tech-Speed Motorsport	Reynard 903	Volkswagen	36	(Spain) Juan Serda	8, 10-14, 16
John Wilcock	Reynard 893	Toyota	37	(United Kingdom) John Wilcock	All
Fred Goddard Racing	Ralt RT34	Mugen-Honda	38	(South Africa) Stephen Watson	11-16
Fred Goddard Racing	Ralt RT34	Volkswagen	40	(United Kingdom) Amanda Runnacles	1-3
Fred Goddard Racing	Ralt RT34	Volkswagen	40	(United Kingdom) Marco Vignali	13-16
Fred Goddard Racing	Ralt RT34	Mugen-Honda	42	(South Africa) Hilton Cowie	1-2
Fred Goddard Racing	Reynard 913	Mugen-Honda	42	(South Africa) Hilton Cowie	3-16
Fred Goddard Racing	Reynard 903	Volkswagen	47	(Greece) Costa Lazakaris	7-8, 10-14
West Surrey Racing	Ralt RT35	Mugen-Honda	39	(United Kingdom) James Taylor	2-4, 8-11, 13-16
West Surrey Racing	Ralt RT35	Mugen-Honda	41	(United Kingdom) Nigel Smith	12-16
Motorsport Team Schemes	Ralt RT35	Mugen-Honda	41	(United Kingdom) Nigel Smith	1-11
Mark Bailey Racing	Ralt RT35	Mugen-Honda	43	(United Kingdom) William Hewland	1-11
Mark Bailey Racing	Reynard 913	Mugen-Honda	43	(United Kingdom) William Hewland	12-15
Mark Bailey Racing	Reynard 913	Mugen-Honda	43	(United Kingdom) Mark Bailey	16
Mark Bailey Racing	Ralt RT35	Mugen-Honda	44	(United Kingdom) Adrian Cottrell	15
Mark Bailey Racing	Ralt RT35	Mugen-Honda	48	(United Kingdom) Paul Evans	2-16
Thornton Mustard	Reynard 893	Volkswagen	44	(United Kingdom) Thornton Mustard	2
GB Motorsport	Reynard 913	Volkswagen	45	(United Kingdom) Gavin Wills	2
Woodcock Bros.	Ralt RT31	Volkswagen	46	(United Kingdom) Gary Woodcock	8, 11
GH Racing	Ralt RT35	Mugen-Honda	50	(United Kingdom) Gray Hedley	All
Bowman Racing	Ralt RT35	Volkswagen	52	(Mexico) Abel Gonzáles	14, 16
Prowess Racing	Argo JM18	Toyota	63	(United Kingdom) Hugo Spowers	15-16

== Race calendar and results ==
Round	Circuit	Date	Pole position	Fastest lap	Winning driver	Winning team	Class B winner
1	Donington Park	22 March	(Netherlands) Marcel Albers	(Brazil) Gil de Ferran	(Netherlands) Marcel Albers	(United Kingdom) Alan Docking Racing	(South Africa) Hilton Cowie
2	Silverstone Circuit	5 April	(Brazil) Gil de Ferran	(Netherlands) Marcel Albers	(Brazil) Gil de Ferran	(United Kingdom) Paul Stewart Racing	(United Kingdom) Paul Evans
3^{1}	Thruxton Circuit	20 April	(Brazil) Gil de Ferran	(Brazil) Gil de Ferran	(Brazil) Gil de Ferran	(United Kingdom) Paul Stewart Racing	(United Kingdom) Steven Arnold
4	Brands Hatch, Kent	26 April	(Brazil) Gil de Ferran	(Brazil) Gil de Ferran	(United Kingdom) Kelvin Burt	(United Kingdom) Fortec Motorsport	(United Kingdom) Paul Evans
5	Thruxton	4 May	(United States) Elton Julian	(Brazil) Gil de Ferran	(United States) Elton Julian	(United Kingdom) Alan Docking Racing	(South Africa) Hilton Cowie
6	Brands Hatch, Kent	17 May	(Brazil) Gil de Ferran	(Belgium) Philippe Adams	(Belgium) Philippe Adams	(United Kingdom) Alan Docking Racing	(South Africa) Hilton Cowie
7	Silverstone Circuit	25 May	(Brazil) Oswaldo Negri	(Brazil) Oswaldo Negri	(Brazil) Gil de Ferran	(United Kingdom) Paul Stewart Racing	(United Kingdom) Paul Evans
8	Silverstone Circuit	7 June	(Belgium) Philippe Adams	(United Kingdom) Kelvin Burt	(Belgium) Philippe Adams	(United Kingdom) Alan Docking Racing	(South Africa) Hilton Cowie
9	Donington Park	21 June	(Brazil) Oswaldo Negri	(Brazil) Oswaldo Negri (United Kingdom) Julian Westwood^{2}	(Brazil) Gil de Ferran	(United Kingdom) Paul Stewart Racing	(United Kingdom) Paul Evans
10	Snetterton Motor Racing Circuit	28 June	(Brazil) Oswaldo Negri	(Belgium) Marc Goossens	(Brazil) Oswaldo Negri	(United Kingdom) West Surrey Racing	(United Kingdom) Paul Evans
11	Silverstone Circuit	11 July	(Brazil) Oswaldo Negri	(United Kingdom) Warren Hughes	(United Kingdom) Warren Hughes	(United Kingdom) Edenbridge Racing	(South Africa) Hilton Cowie
12	Pembrey Circuit	9 August	(United Kingdom) Kelvin Burt	(United Kingdom) Kelvin Burt	(Brazil) Gil de Ferran	(United Kingdom) Paul Stewart Racing	(United Kingdom) Paul Evans
13	Silverstone Circuit	31 August	(Belgium) Philippe Adams	(Belgium) Philippe Adams	(Belgium) Philippe Adams	(United Kingdom) Alan Docking Racing	(United Kingdom) Paul Evans
14	Donington Park	20 September	(Brazil) Gil de Ferran	(Brazil) Gil de Ferran	(United Kingdom) Kelvin Burt	(United Kingdom) Fortec Motorsport	(South Africa) Hilton Cowie
15	Thruxton Circuit	27 September	(Brazil) Gil de Ferran	(United Kingdom) Kelvin Burt	(Brazil) Gil de Ferran	(United Kingdom) Paul Stewart Racing	(South Africa) Hilton Cowie
16	Silverstone Circuit	4 October	(Brazil) André Ribeiro	(Brazil) Gil de Ferran	(Brazil) Gil de Ferran	(United Kingdom) Paul Stewart Racing	(United Kingdom) Paul Evans

^1 Round 3 was shortened due to the fatal crash of Albers.
^2 Negri and Westwood set identical fastest lap times and were subsequently both awarded an additional point.

== Championship Standings ==
Points in brackets include dropped scores - only the best 13 of 16 scores count towards the championship

Pos.	Driver	DON	SIL	THR	BRH	THR	BRH	SIL	SIL	DON	SNE	SIL	PEM	SIL	DON	THR	SIL	Pts
Class A
1	(Brazil) Gil de Ferran	3	1	1	2	2	2	1	2	1	(5)	Ret	1	2	(3)	1	1	102
2	(Belgium) Philippe Adams	4	11	5	4	Ret	1	2	1	6	2	Ret	3	1	Ret	Ret	5	56
3	(United Kingdom) Kelvin Burt	2	4	12	1	10	8	4	3	9	8	2	Ret	6	1	2	2	55
4	(Brazil) Oswaldo Negri	5	3	4	9	6	4	13	4	2	1	4	6	4	Ret	11	21	43
5	(Belgium) Mikke van Hool	8	2	2	NS	4	3	Ret	Ret	Ret	Ret	6	Ret	3	Ret	5	6	29
6	(Belgium) Marc Goossens	17	5	11	Ret	8	5	3	7	18	4	Ret	11	5	2	3	4	28
7	(United Kingdom) Warren Hughes	9	6	6	7	9	Ret	7	6	5	Ret	1	2	9	7	Ret	3	25
8	(United States) Elton Julian	6	7	8	6	1	7	6	8	4	7	Ret			14	7	10	17
9	(United Kingdom) Julian Westwood									3	3	7	5	Ret	6	9	7	13
10	(Brazil) André Ribeiro	Ret	NS	9	Ret	Ret	Ret	10	Ret	10	6	3	4	7	5	4	Ret	13
11	(Netherlands) Marcel Albers†	1	Ret	7														10
12	(Brazil) Pedro Diniz	Ret	14	3	3	Ret	Ret	NS	10	Ret	Ret	Ret	Ret	Ret	8	8	11	8
13	(United Kingdom) Jason Plato	7	13	10	5	7	9	5	5									8
14	(United Kingdom) Scott Lakin													10	4	10	13	3
15	(Netherlands) Franc ten Wolde									13	11	10						0
Class B
1	(United Kingdom) Paul Evans		8	NS	8	5	10	8	Ret	7	9	8	7	8	10	Ret	8	101
2	(South Africa) Hilton Cowie	10	Ret	16	Ret	3	6	Ret	9	Ret	10	5	Ret	DSQ	9	6	9	83
3	(United Kingdom) Nigel Smith	Ret	9	14	10	13	12	9	(15)	8	12	Ret	8	11	12	12	12	67
4	(United Kingdom) Steven Arnold	11	10	13	Ret	12	Ret	11	11	11	13	11	9	12	11	(16)	15	57
5	(United Kingdom) William Hewland	12	12	15	11	11	11	12	12	12	Ret	9	Ret	Ret	13	15		42
6	(United Kingdom) Gray Hedley	13	17	18	13	14	13	14	13	14	14	Ret	13	16	16	Ret	17	19
7	(South Africa) Stephen Watson											12	10	13	15	14	14	15
8	(United Kingdom) John Wilcock	14	19	19	12	15	14	15	14	15	17	14	Ret	18	20	Ret	18	10
9	(United Kingdom) Adrian Cottrell															13		4
10	(United Kingdom) Amanda Runnacles	15	16	17														4
11	(Spain) Juan Serda								16		16	13	12	17	19		19	3
12	(United Kingdom) James Taylor		Ret	Ret	Ret				17	16	15	15		15	18		16	3
13	(United Kingdom) Marco Vignali													14	Ret	NS	Ret	2
14	(United Kingdom) Gavin Wills		15															2
15	(United States) John Lee	16	Ret	20	14	16	15	Ret		17	18	17		20	21	17	NS	1
16	(Greece) Costa Lazarakis							16	Ret			18	14	19				0
17	(United Kingdom) Gary Woodcock								18			16						0
18	(Mexico) Abel Gonzáles														17		Ret	0
19	(United Kingdom) Hugo Spowers															Ret	20	0
	(United Kingdom) Thornton Mustard		Ret															0
	(United Kingdom) Mark Bailey																Ret	0
