= 1993 British Formula Three Championship =

1993 British Formula 3 International Series

Seasons
- ← 1992 1994 →

The 1993 British Formula Three season was the 43rd British Formula Three Championship, won by Kelvin Burt. The season started on 21 March at Silverstone and ended at Thruxton on 10 October at following fifteen races. Paul Stewart Racing were forced to switch Burt from a Reynard to a Dallara chassis in order to stave off the challenge of Oliver Gavin, who had been using a Dallara since the fourth round. The season marked the beginning of the Italian firm's domination of the series — Dallara chassis have won every British F3 title since. Class B was won by British driver Jamie Spence.

The scoring system was 9-6-4-3-2-1 points awarded to the first six finishers, with 1 (one) extra point added to the driver who set the fastest lap of the race. The best 12 results counted for the driver's final tally.

== Drivers and Teams ==
Team	No	Driver	Chassis	Engine	Rounds
Class A
(United Kingdom) Paul Stewart Racing	1	(United Kingdom) Kelvin Burt	Reynard 933	Mugen-Honda	1-9
(United Kingdom) Paul Stewart Racing	1	(United Kingdom) Kelvin Burt	Dallara F393	Mugen-Honda	10-15
(United Kingdom) Paul Stewart Racing	2	(United Kingdom) Paul Evans	Reynard 933	Mugen-Honda	1-12
(United Kingdom) Paul Stewart Racing	2	(United Kingdom) Dario Franchitti	Reynard 933	Mugen-Honda	13
(United Kingdom) Paul Stewart Racing	2	(Denmark) Jan Magnussen	Dallara F393	Mugen-Honda	14-15
(United Kingdom) West Surrey Racing	3	(Belgium) Marc Goossens	Reynard 933	Mugen-Honda	1-8
(United Kingdom) West Surrey Racing	3	(Belgium) Marc Goossens	Dallara F393	Mugen-Honda	9-15
(United Kingdom) West Surrey Racing	4	(Spain) Pedro de la Rosa	Reynard 933	Mugen-Honda	1-9
(United Kingdom) West Surrey Racing	4	(Spain) Pedro de la Rosa	Dallara F393	Mugen-Honda	10-15
(United Kingdom) West Surrey Racing	42	(France) Jérémie Dufour	Reynard 933	Mugen-Honda	1-9
(United Kingdom) West Surrey Racing	42	(France) Jérémie Dufour	Dallara F393	Mugen-Honda	11-15
(United Kingdom) Edenbridge Racing	5	(United Kingdom) Oliver Gavin	Ralt RT37	Vauxhall	1-3
(United Kingdom) Edenbridge Racing	5	(United Kingdom) Oliver Gavin	Dallara F393	Vauxhall	4-15
(United Kingdom) Edenbridge Racing	6	(Brazil) Gualter Salles	Ralt RT37	Vauxhall	1-2
(United Kingdom) Edenbridge Racing	6	(Brazil) Gualter Salles	Dallara F393	Vauxhall	4
(United Kingdom) Edenbridge Racing	6	(Brazil) Marcos Gueiros	Dallara F393	Vauxhall	6-15
(United Kingdom) Alan Docking Racing	7	(Brazil) Ricardo Rosset	Ralt RT37	Mugen-Honda	1-8
(United Kingdom) Alan Docking Racing	7	(Brazil) Ricardo Rosset	Dallara F393	Mugen-Honda	9-15
(United Kingdom) Alan Docking Racing	8	(United States) Brian Cunningham	Dallara F393	Mugen-Honda	11-15
(United Kingdom) Fortec Motorsport	9	(Brazil) André Ribeiro	Reynard 933	Mugen-Honda	1-10
(United Kingdom) Fortec Motorsport	9	(Brazil) André Ribeiro	Dallara F393	Mugen-Honda	11-15
(United Kingdom) Fortec Motorsport	10	(United Kingdom) Gareth Rees	Reynard 933	Mugen-Honda	All
(United Kingdom) P1 Engineering	12	(Belgium) Mikke van Hool	Reynard 933	Mugen-Honda	1-3
(United Kingdom) P1 Engineering	12	(Spain) Miguel Ángel de Castro	Reynard 933	Mugen-Honda	5-9
(United Kingdom) P1 Engineering	12	(United Kingdom) Dino Morelli	Reynard 933	Mugen-Honda	14-15
(United Kingdom) P1 Engineering	12	(United Kingdom) Christian Horner	Reynard 933	Mugen-Honda	10
(United Kingdom) Richard Arnold Developments	14	(United Kingdom) Steven Arnold	Dallara F393	Mugen-Honda	All
(United Kingdom) Richard Arnold Developments	15	(United Kingdom) Warren Hughes	Dallara F393	Fiat	2-15
(Italy) Supercars	16	(Italy) Alberto Pedemonte	Dallara F393	Fiat	11
(United Kingdom) Ralt Cars	20	(United Kingdom) Jeremy Cotterill	Ralt 93C	Mugen-Honda	14-15
(United Kingdom) Intersport	27	(United Kingdom) Scott Lakin	Reynard 933	Fiat	6, 8-15
Class B
(United Kingdom) Fred Goddard Racing	21	(South Africa) Hennie Groenewald	Reynard 913	Mugen-Honda	All
(United Kingdom) Fred Goddard Racing	40	(United Kingdom) William Hewland	Reynard 913	Mugen-Honda	All
(United Kingdom) Fred Goddard Racing	41	(South Africa) Stephen Watson	Reynard 923	Mugen-Honda	1-8
(United Kingdom) Fred Goddard Racing	41	(Greece) Costas Lazarakis	Reynard 913	Mugen-Honda	12-13
(United Kingdom) GH Racing	31	(United Kingdom) Gray Hedley	Reynard 923	Mugen-Honda	All
(United Kingdom) Jamie Spence	33	(United Kingdom) Jamie Spence	Bowman BC2	Mugen-Honda	1-13
(United Kingdom) Mansilla Racing	34	(Mexico) Abel Gonzales	Ralt RT35	Mugen-Honda	All
(Spain) Miguel de Castro	35	(Spain) Miguel Ángel de Castro	Bowman BC2	Mugen-Honda	1-2
(United Kingdom) Alan Docking Racing	36	(United States) Brian Cunningham	Ralt RT36	Mugen-Honda	1-10
(United Kingdom) Alan Docking Racing	38	(United Kingdom) Chris Clark	Ralt RT36	Mugen-Honda	All
(United Kingdom) John Wilcock	37	(United Kingdom) John Wilcock	Reynard 893	Toyota	1-10, 13-15
(United Kingdom) Tech-Speed Motorsport	39	(Spain) Juan Serda	Reynard 903	Volkswagen	2, 4, 7, 9, 11
(United Kingdom) Data Express Motorsport	44	(United Kingdom) Michael Brain	Reynard 923	Mugen-Honda	3-15
(United Kingdom) Mark Bailey Racing	48	(United Kingdom) Derek Watts	Ralt RT36	Mugen-Honda	1-8
(United Kingdom) Mark Bailey Racing	48	(United Kingdom) Paul Quinn	Ralt RT36	Mugen-Honda	9, 11
(United Kingdom) Mark Bailey Racing	48	(United Kingdom) Dominic Sutton	Ralt RT36	Mugen-Honda	10
(United Kingdom) Mark Bailey Racing	48	(United Kingdom) Steve Allen	Ralt RT36	Mugen-Honda	14
(United Kingdom) Mark Bailey Racing	49	(Canada) Jean Clermont	Ralt RT36	Mugen-Honda	13-15
(United Kingdom) P1 Engineering	50	(United Kingdom) Christian Horner	Reynard 923	Mugen-Honda	1-9, 11-14
(United Kingdom) P1 Engineering	50	(United Kingdom) Piers Hunnisett	Reynard 923	Mugen-Honda	15
(United Kingdom) Prowess Racing	51	(United Kingdom) John Goate	Ralt RT36	Mugen-Honda	1-2, 5
(United Kingdom) Prowess Racing	57	(United Kingdom) Hugo Spowers	Ralt RT36	Mugen-Honda	3-4
(United Kingdom) Steve Mole Racing	55	(United Kingdom) George King	Ralt RT34	Volkswagen	7, 9, 11
(United Kingdom) Steve Mole Racing	56	(United Kingdom) Andrew Nimmo	Ralt RT34	Volkswagen	6, 8, 10, 12–13, 15

== Race calendar and results ==
Round	Circuit	Date	Pole position	Fastest lap	Winning driver	Winning team	Class B winner
1	Silverstone	21 March	(Brazil) Andre Ribeiro	(United Kingdom) Kelvin Burt	(United Kingdom) Kelvin Burt	(United Kingdom) Paul Stewart Racing	(United Kingdom) Jamie Spence
2	Thruxton	4 April	(Belgium) Marc Goossens	(United Kingdom) Warren Hughes	(Belgium) Marc Goossens	(United Kingdom) West Surrey Racing	(United Kingdom) Christian Horner
3	Brands Hatch	18 April	(Brazil) Andre Ribeiro	(United Kingdom) Warren Hughes	(United Kingdom) Kelvin Burt	(United Kingdom) Paul Stewart Racing	(United Kingdom) Jamie Spence
4	Donington Park	3 May	(United Kingdom) Kelvin Burt	(United Kingdom) Kelvin Burt	(United Kingdom) Kelvin Burt	(United Kingdom) Paul Stewart Racing	(United Kingdom) Christian Horner
5	Brands Hatch	16 May	(United Kingdom) Kelvin Burt	(Belgium) Marc Goossens	(United Kingdom) Kelvin Burt	(United Kingdom) Paul Stewart Racing	(United Kingdom) Jamie Spence
6	Silverstone	31 May	(United Kingdom) Oliver Gavin	(United Kingdom) Oliver Gavin	(United Kingdom) Oliver Gavin	(United Kingdom) Edenbridge Racing	(United Kingdom) Jamie Spence
7	Oulton Park	12 June	(United Kingdom) Kelvin Burt	(United Kingdom) Kelvin Burt	(United Kingdom) Oliver Gavin	(United Kingdom) Edenbridge Racing	(United Kingdom) Chris Clark
8	Donington Park	27 June	(United Kingdom) Oliver Gavin	(United Kingdom) Warren Hughes	(United Kingdom) Oliver Gavin	(United Kingdom) Edenbridge Racing	(United Kingdom) Jamie Spence
9	Silverstone	10 July	(United Kingdom) Warren Hughes	(United Kingdom) Oliver Gavin	(United Kingdom) Oliver Gavin	(United Kingdom) Edenbridge Racing	(United Kingdom) Jamie Spence
10	Donington Park	18 July	(United Kingdom) Kelvin Burt	(United Kingdom) Oliver Gavin	(United Kingdom) Kelvin Burt	(United Kingdom) Paul Stewart Racing	(United Kingdom) Jamie Spence
11	Snetterton	8 August	(United Kingdom) Kelvin Burt	(United Kingdom) Kelvin Burt	(United Kingdom) Kelvin Burt	(United Kingdom) Paul Stewart Racing	(South Africa) Stephen Watson
12	Pembrey	22 August	(United Kingdom) Kelvin Burt	(United Kingdom) Oliver Gavin	(United Kingdom) Oliver Gavin	(United Kingdom) Edenbridge Racing	(United Kingdom) Christian Horner
13	Silverstone	5 September	(United Kingdom) Kelvin Burt	(United Kingdom) Oliver Gavin	(United Kingdom) Kelvin Burt	(United Kingdom) Paul Stewart Racing	(United Kingdom) Christian Horner
14	Silverstone	3 October	(United Kingdom) Kelvin Burt	(United Kingdom) Kelvin Burt	(United Kingdom) Kelvin Burt	(United Kingdom) Paul Stewart Racing	(United Kingdom) Christian Horner
15	Thruxton	10 October	(Belgium) Marc Goossens	(United Kingdom) Kelvin Burt	(United Kingdom) Kelvin Burt	(United Kingdom) Paul Stewart Racing	(United Kingdom) Piers Hunnisett

== Championship Standings ==
Points in brackets include dropped scores — only the best 12 of 15 scores count towards the championship

Pos.	Driver	SIL	THR	BRH	DON	BRH	SIL	OUL	DON	SIL	DON	SNE	PEM	SIL	SIL	THR	Pts
Class A
1	(United Kingdom) Kelvin Burt	1	2	1	1	1	3	(4)	(3)	(4)	1	1	2	1	1	1	102
2	(United Kingdom) Oliver Gavin	Ret	7	11	2	3	1	1	1	1	3	4	1	11	3	2	77
3	(Belgium) Marc Goossens	4	1	9	4	2	DSQ	2	Ret	6	2	2	3	DSQ	2	Ret	51
4	(United Kingdom) Warren Hughes		6	10	11	7	2	3	2	2	4	Ret	11	4	8	4	35
5	(Brazil) André Ribeiro	3	Ret	2	10	5	Ret	Ret	DSQ	9	9	6	5	3	24	Ret	19
6	(Brazil) Ricardo Rosset	Ret	8	6	DNS	6	8	Ret	8	3	10	3	9	2	6	6	18
7	(Spain) Pedro de la Rosa	5	3	DNS	3	4	4	5	Ret	7	Ret	NC	8	Ret	Ret	7	18
8	(United Kingdom) Paul Evans	2	10	7	5	Ret	5	8	6	13	14	10	12				12
9	(France) Jérémie Dufour	12	19	3	6	10	10	7	5	Ret		24	6	9	12	5	11
10	(United Kingdom) Steven Arnold	9	5	5	7	11	9	9	7	5	6	5	7	6	11	Ret	11
11	(Denmark) Jan Magnussen														4	3	7
12	(Brazil) Marcos Gueiros						7	10	13	Ret	7	13	4	Ret	5	Ret	5
13	(United Kingdom) Gareth Rees	6	4	Ret	16	8	Ret	6	Ret	11	Ret	8	10	7	7	20	5
14	(Belgium) Mikke van Hool	7	DNS	4													3
15	(United Kingdom) Scott Lakin						Ret		9	8	5	7	14	Ret	Ret	9	2
16	(United Kingdom) Dario Franchitti													5			2
17	(Spain) Miguel Ángel de Castro					12	6	Ret	10	12							1
18	(United Kingdom) Dino Morelli														9	8	0
19	(United States) Brian Cunningham											16	15	10	10	10	0
20	(United Kingdom) Christian Horner										11						0
21	(Italy) Alberto Pedemonte											12					0
22	(United Kingdom) Jeremy Cotterill														13	Ret	0
23	(Brazil) Gualter Salles	DSQ	15		Ret												0
Class B
1	(United Kingdom) Jamie Spence	8	Ret	8	Ret	9	11	12	4	10	8	Ret	Ret	11			83
2	(United Kingdom) Christian Horner	10	9	Ret	8	DSQ	Ret	14	12	Ret		11	13	8	14		68
3	(United Kingdom) Chris Clark	19	11	13	17	13	15	11	14	19	13	18	17	14	15	14	50
4	(South Africa) Stephen Watson	Ret	12	16	9	Ret	14	19	Ret	15	Ret	9	16	13	16	12	48
5	(South Africa) Hennie Groenewald	17	22	12	12	14	13	17	11	Ret	12	14	19	15	Ret	Ret	37
6	(Mexico) Abel Gonzalez	14	18	17	Ret	Ret	Ret	18	DNS	14	Ret	15	Ret	12	17	13	22
7	(United Kingdom) William Hewland	15	14	15	14	16	Ret	16	15	17	Ret	20	18	16	18	Ret	19
8	(United Kingdom) Michael Brain			19	13	15	17	20	16	Ret	15	17	20	17	19	16	15
9	(United States) Brian Cunningham	13	DNS	Ret	Ret	Ret	12	13	Ret	18	Ret						14
10	(United Kingdom) Piers Hunnisett															11	10
11	(United Kingdom) Derek Watts	11	17	14	15	Ret	Ret	15	Ret								10
12	(United Kingdom) Gray Hedley	18	16	Ret	18	17	16	21	17	16	16	19	Ret	Ret	20	15	10
13	(Spain) Miguel Ángel de Castro	16	13														3
14	(United Kingdom) Andrew Nimmo						19		19		17		21	21		19	1
15	(Canada) Jean Clermont													18	23	17	0
16	(United Kingdom) John Wilcock	Ret	21	18	19	18	18	22	18	22	DNS			19	22	18	0
17	(Spain) Juan Serda		18		21			23		21		23					0
18	(United Kingdom) George King							24		20		22					0
19	(United Kingdom) John Goate	20	23			DNS											0
20	(United Kingdom) Hugo Spowers			Ret	20												0
21	(Greece) Costas Lazarakis												Ret	20			0
22	(United Kingdom) Paul Quinn									Ret		21					0
23	(United Kingdom) Steve Allen														21		0
	(United Kingdom) Dominic Sutton										Ret						0
Pos.	Driver	SIL	THR	BRH	DON	BRH	SIL	OUL	DON	SIL	DON	SNE	PEM	SIL	SIL	THR	Pts
