= Elton Julian =

American racing driver and team owner

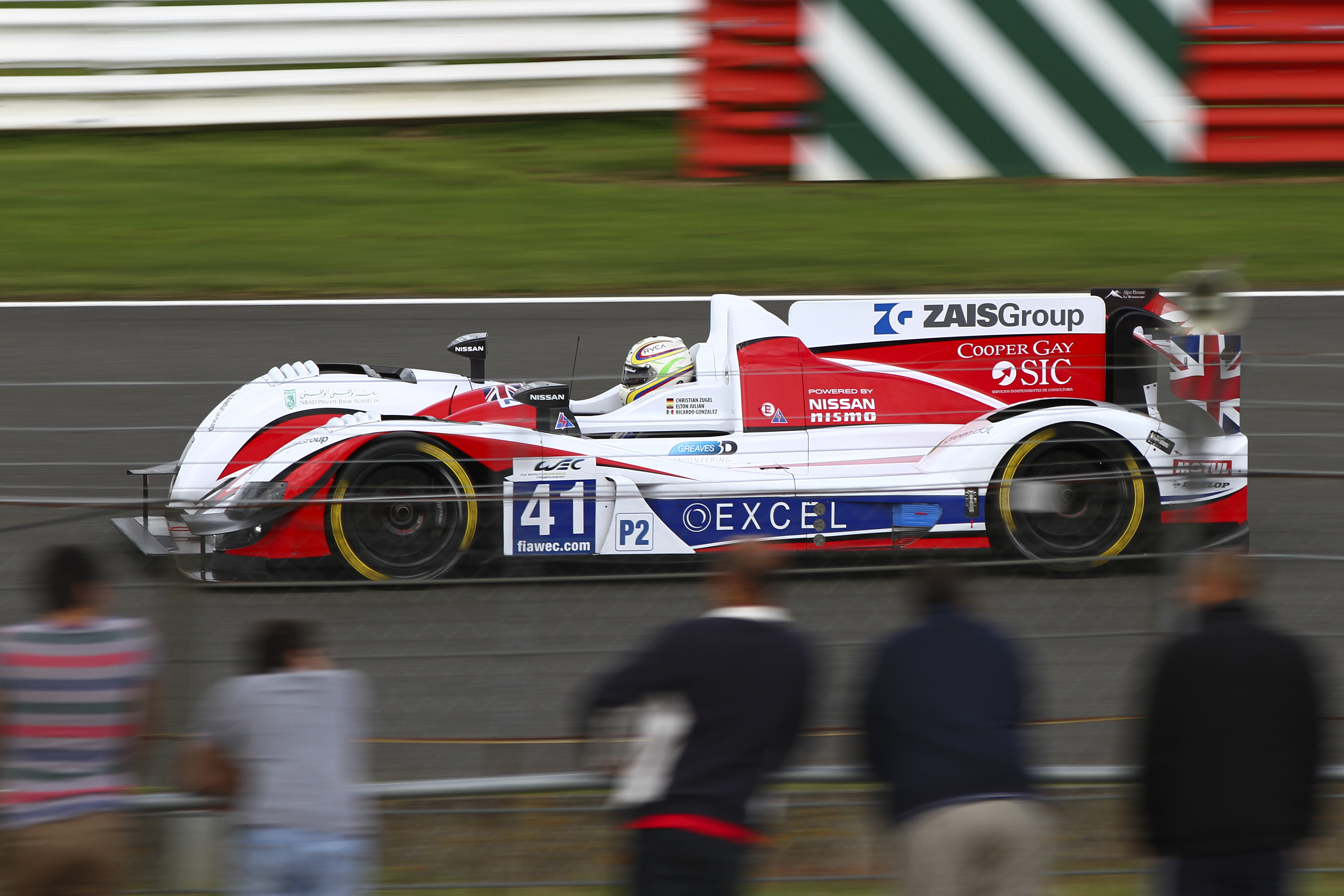
- Julian's Greaves Motorsport Zytek in 2012
- Nationality: (United States) American
- Born: August 16, 1974 (age 52) Las Palmas de Gran Canaria, Spain
- Categorisation: FIA Gold (until 2015); FIA Silver (2016–2025); FIA Bronze (2026–)

Elton Julian (born August 16, 1974) is an American racecar driver and team owner. After driving at the International Formula 3000 and the FIA World Endurance Championship, he has entered DragonSpeed at the FIA WEC, WeatherTech SportsCar Championship, European Le Mans Series and IndyCar Series.

== Personal life ==
Julian was born in the Canary Islands of Spain. He grew up in Ecuador and the United States. He speaks English, French and Spanish fluently.

== Racing career ==
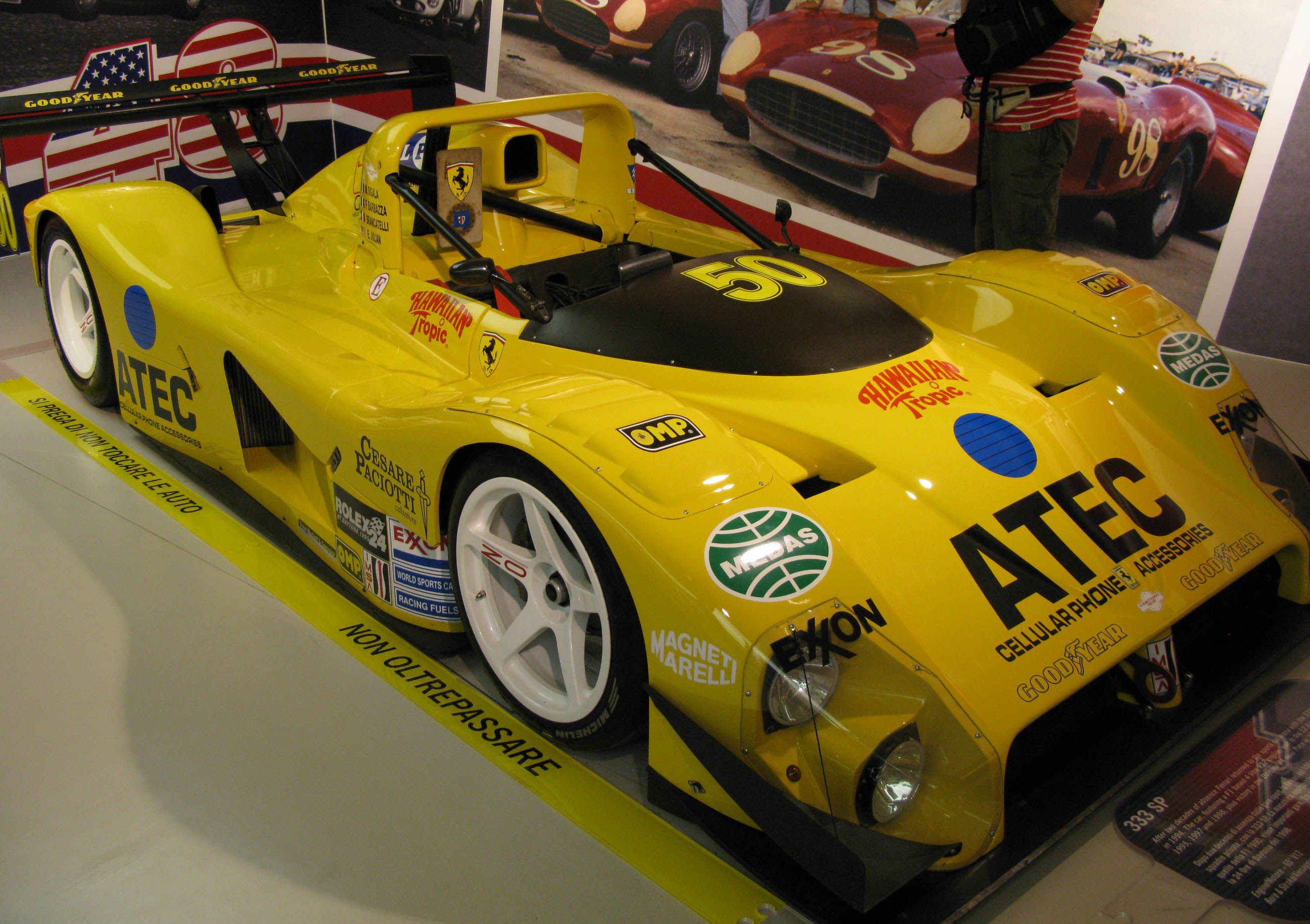
A Ferrari 333 SP, as raced by Julian in 1995 (pictured in 2014).

=== Early career ===
Julian began his racing career in Southern California at the age of 13, racing go karts before moving on to Formula Ford at the Skip Barber Racing School where he won 36 races from 49 starts and four championships in 1990.

=== Formula Three ===
In 1992, Julian raced in the British Formula 3 Championship for the Alan Docking Racing and Fortec Motorsport teams finishing 8th in the championship with one pole position and one win, becoming the youngest winner in series history. That same year he also competed in the Indy Lights series at Vancouver and finished eighth. In 1993, he raced in the French Formula Three Championship and finished third in the drivers championship for the Formula Project team.

=== Formula One ===
In 1994, Julian signed a multi-year test and reserve driver contract with the French Larrousse Formula One team, completing several tests at Circuit Paul Ricard in Le Castellet, France. In his first test, he was over half a second faster than regular driver Érik Comas and Julian was considered a potential candidate for a race seat in 1995. However, the Larrousse team closed its doors for financial reasons just before the start of the 1995 season despite last minute attempts to save the squad by the F3000 racing team DAMS and other interested parties.

=== Formula 3000/Formula Atlantic/Formula Nippon ===
In preparation for his testing duties with Larrousse, Julian entered the FIA International Formula 3000 series for three races in 1994 and made his debut at Circuit de Spa-Francorchamps in Belgium for the Omegaland team. He competed in the remaining races of the 1994 International Formula 3000 season and finished 13th in France at Magny-Cours. He returned to Europe for the 1996 International Formula 3000 season and competed full-time for Nordic Racing. The season was not particularly successful as the team failed to come to grips with the all new Lola chassis and Julian only broke into the points at the final race of the season at the Hockenheimring in Germany with a fifth-place result. He finished 14th in the championship. In 1997, he tested a Formula Nippon car at the Suzuka Circuit in Japan and was offered a contract for the following season, but a lack of funding kept him out of racing until 1999, when he made two Atlantic Championship starts for the PDR team resulting in a fifth-place finish at Long Beach and a DNF in Montreal.

=== Sports Cars ===
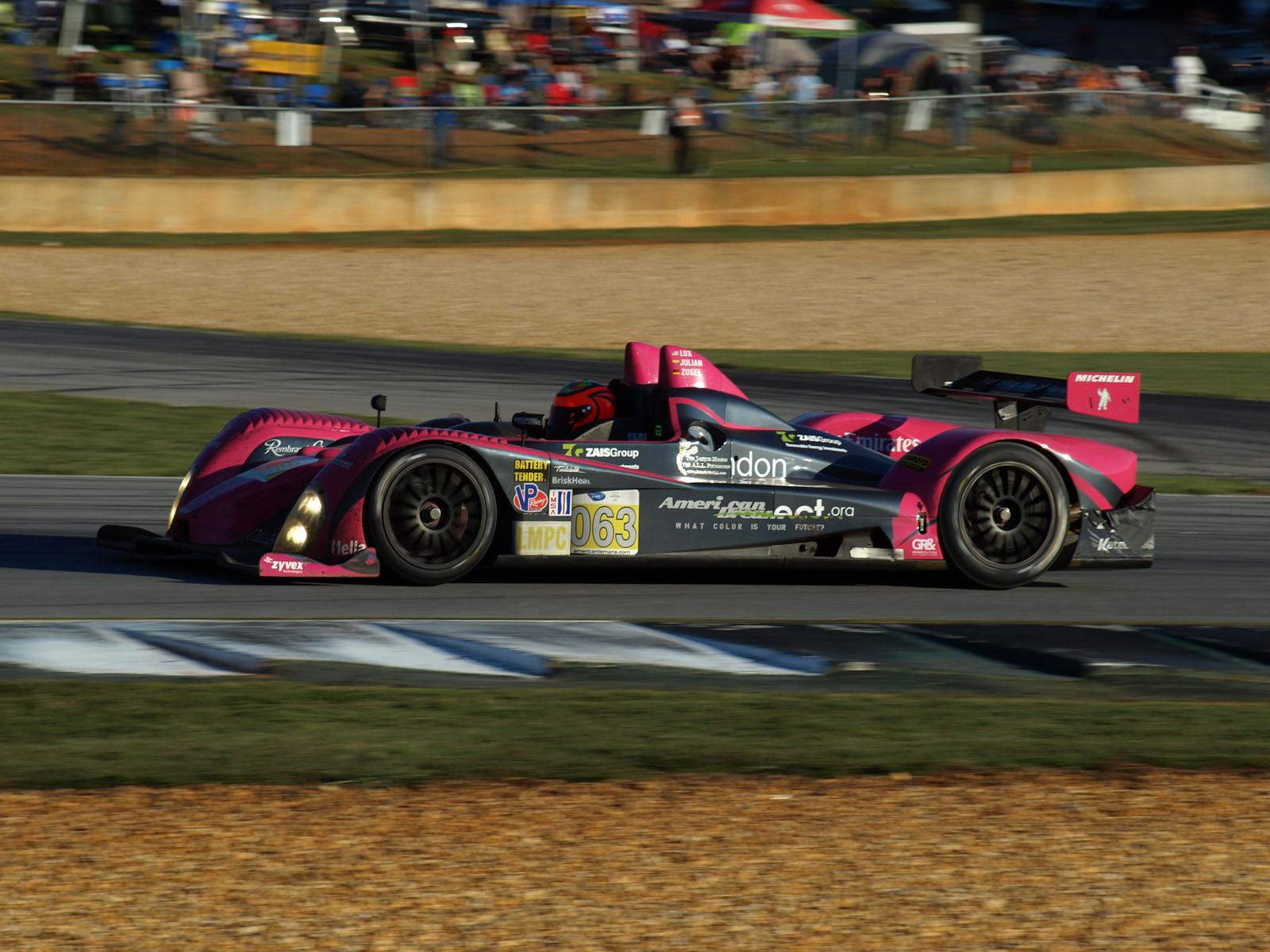
Julian's FLM-spec Oreca at the 2011 Petit Le Mans.

When the Larrousse Formula One team shut down in 1995, Julian turned to sports cars and drove in two World Sportscar Championship races with Euromotorsport in a Ferrari F333SP prototype finishing second in class at the 24 Hours of Daytona and setting a new lap record at the 12 Hours of Sebring. After the end of his single seater career and another long absence from racing which lasted from 1999 until 2005, he raced a DOME S101 LMP1 prototype in the 2005 24 Hours of Le Mans with Jan Lammers and the Racing for Holland team. He finished fifth in the prototype class and seventh place overall, recorded the teams fastest race laps and was the highest finishing rookie in the race. He then drove a Courage C65 LMP2 prototype in the American Le Mans Series' Petit Le Mans for Kruse Motorsport and finished fourth in class. In 2006, he drove in the LMP2 prototype class at the 12 Hours of Sebring for Barazi Epsilon with another fourth-place finish in the LMP2 category. In 2010 with the introduction of the American Le Mans Series' new LMPC prototype class, Julian signed on to race the Oreca FLM09 chassis for Gunnar Racing. He finished the season third in the drivers championship, with seven podium finishes in eight starts and four wins (Long Beach, Lime Rock, Road America and Mosport). He ended the 2011 American Le Mans Series season fourth in the LMPC prototype class championship with five podium finishes in seven starts including a win from pole position at Lime Rock and a first-place finish at the six-hour Laguna Seca round. Julian also drove the Oreca prototype in the FLM class of the 2011 Le Mans Series season finishing second at Circuit Paul Ricard in France, second at Spa Francorchamps in Belgium and fourth at the Autodromo Enzo e Dino Ferrari in Imola, Italy. He finished the European Le Mans Series championship third in the drivers standings. For 2012, Julian signed with the Greaves Motorsport team to drive the Zytek-Nissan Z11SN LMP2 prototype chassis in the eight round 2012 FIA World Endurance Championship season, which included the 80th running of the 24 Hours of Le Mans. He ended the inaugural FIA WEC season with eight points finishes from eight starts. His professional driving record in sports cars stands at six wins, 16 podiums (including the 12 Hours of Sebring, 24 Hours of Daytona, 1000 km of Spa-Francorchamps and Petit Le Mans), two pole positions, two fastest laps, one new lap record, and 29 finishes from 30 starts.

=== Team Principal ===
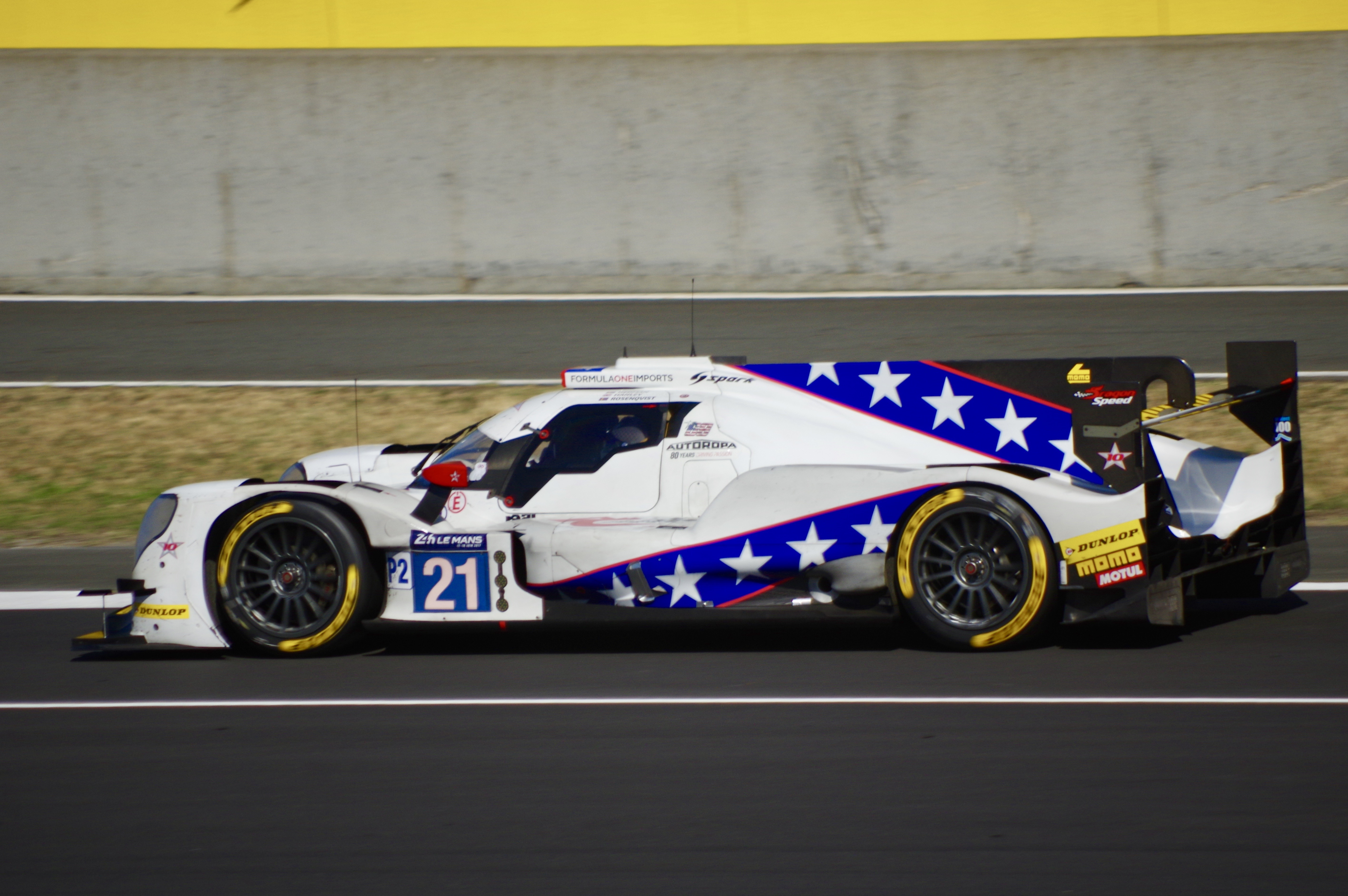
Julian founded DragonSpeed in 2007.

Starting in 2007, Julian began to focus on team ownership, founding DragonSpeed and entering cars in the American Le Mans Series, Rolex Grand-Am Series, Blancpain Lamborghini Super Trofeo, Pirelli World Challenge, Ferrari Challenge and Pirelli Drivers Cup Series. In 2011 Julian entered the DragonSpeed Ferrari F430 GT in the Rolex 24 Hours of Daytona and acting as team owner/team manager, brought the Ferrari home to a 15th-place finish in the GT class, making the car the highest finishing F430 in the history of the event. As a result of the performance at Daytona, DragonSpeed and Julian were asked to provide technical support for the new Ferrari 458 Italia GA (Grand Am) development program which began testing in July 2011 at Daytona. In 2012 DragonSpeed ran an extensive test program with their new Audi R8 LMS ultra FIA GT3 in preparation for the 2013 Dubai 24 Hours endurance race, marking the international debut for the team. DragonSpeed had a successful run in Dubai under the direction of Julian, finishing 11th overall from 80 cars and fifth in the A6-Am class and followed that up with a 17th-place finish for the Audi R8 LMS Ultra at the 2013 12 Hours of Bathurst in Australia. Julian then brought the team back to the United States to contest the 2013 American Le Mans Series in the Prototype Challenge class with Mirco Schultis, Renger van der Zande and Pierre Kaffer sharing driver duties. For 2014 DragonSpeed raced in the Pirelli World Challenge series, running a Ferrari 458 GT3 Italia race car in the GT-A class for driver Henrik Hedman.

== Racing record ==
=== Complete International Formula 3000 results ===
(key) (Races in bold indicate pole position) (Races in italics indicate fastest lap)

Year	Entrant	1	2	3	4	5	6	7	8	9	10	DC	Points
1994	Omegaland	SIL	PAU	CAT	PER	HOC	SPA; 15	EST; 14	MAG; 13			NC	0
1996	Nordic Racing	NÜR; 13	PAU; DNS	PER; Ret	HOC; Ret	SIL; 7	SPA; 14	MAG; 12	EST; 18	MUG; 14	HOC; 5	14th	2

=== American open-wheel racing results ===
(key) (Races in bold indicate pole position) (Races in italics indicate fastest lap)

==== Atlantic Championship ====
(key) (Races in bold indicate pole position)

Year	Team	1	2	3	4	5	6	7	8	9	10	11	12	Rank	Points
1999	PDR Enterprises	LBH; 5	NAZ	GAT	MIL	MTL; 29	ROA	TRR	MDO	CHI	VAN	LS	HOU	**18th**	**10**

=== 24 Hours of Le Mans results ===
Year	Team	Co-Drivers	Car	Class	Laps	Pos.	Class Pos.
2005	(Netherlands) Racing for Holland	(Netherlands) Jan Lammers (Netherlands) John Bosch	Dome S101-Judd	LMP1	346	7th	5th
2012	(United Kingdom) Greaves Motorsport	(Germany) Christian Zugel (Mexico) Ricardo González	Zytek Z11SN-Nissan	LMP2	348	12th	5th

=== Complete FIA World Endurance Championship results ===
Year	Entrant	Class	Chassis	Engine	1	2	3	4	5	6	7	8	Rank	Points
2012	Greaves Motorsport	LMP2	Zytek Z11SN	Nissan VK45DE 4.5 L V8	SEB; 7	SPA; 12	LMS; 10	SIL; 17	SÃO; 11	BHR; 12	FUJ; 14	SHA; 15	26th	11
