= 1999 Formula Nippon Championship =

The 1999 Formula Nippon Championship was the twenty-seventh season of premier Japanese single-seater racing, and the fourth under the Formula Nippon name and Japan Race Promotion (JRP) management. The series was contested over ten rounds at five venues. 14 different teams, 26 different drivers, and three different chassis suppliers competed in the championship. Nakajima Racing driver Tom Coronel won the championship in his second season.

The series introduced the Exciting Point championship in 1999, which awarded points to drivers for setting the fastest laps of the race, running in the top six at each quarter of the race, and improving position throughout the race.

== Teams and drivers ==
All teams used tyres supplied by Bridgestone and Mugen MF308 engines.

Team	#	Driver	Chassis	Rounds
Unlimited Racing Team LeMans	1	(Japan) Satoshi Motoyama	Reynard 99L	All
Unlimited Racing Team LeMans	2	(Japan) Koji Yamanishi	Reynard 99L	All
Asahi Kiko Sports	3	(Japan) Atsushi Kawamoto	Reynard 99L	All
Team 5ZIGEN	5	(Japan) Shigekazu Wakisaka	Reynard 99L	1–3
Team 5ZIGEN	5	(Japan) Tetsuya Tanaka	Reynard 99L	5–10
Team 5ZIGEN	6	(Japan) Tetsuya Tanaka	Reynard 99L	1
Team 5ZIGEN	6	(Germany) Michael Krumm	Reynard 99L	2–10
Shionogi Team Nova	9	(Republic of Ireland) Ralph Firman Jr.	G-Force GF03B	All
Shionogi Team Nova	10	(Japan) Hiroki Katoh	G-Force GF03B	All
Cosmo Oil Racing Team Cerumo	11	(Japan) Yuji Tachikawa	Reynard 99L	All
Cosmo Oil Racing Team Cerumo	12	(Japan) Akira Iida	Reynard 99L	All
Speedmaster Mooncraft	14	(Japan) Ryō Michigami	Lola B99/51	All
Speedmaster Mooncraft	15	(Japan) Masahiko Kageyama	Lola B99/51	All
Team TMS	17	(Germany) Dominik Schwager	Lola B99/51	1–6
Team TMS	18	(Japan) Takuya Kurosawa	Lola B99/51	1–6
Be Brides Team Impul	19	(Japan) Masami Kageyama	Lola B99/51; Reynard 99L	All
Be Brides Team Impul	20	(Japan) Hideki Noda	Lola B99/51; Reynard 99L	All
Mirai	32	(Japan) Masahiko Kondo	Lola B99/51	1–3
Takagi B-1 Racing	36	(Japan) Tetsuji Tamanaka	Lola B99/51; Reynard 99L	1, 3–10
Autobacs Racing Team Aguri	55	(Japan) Katsutomo Kaneishi	Lola B99/51; Reynard 99L	All
Autobacs Racing Team Aguri	56	(Japan) Juichi Wakisaka	Lola B99/51; Reynard 99L	All
Team LeyJun	62	(United Kingdom) Peter Dumbreck	Reynard 99L	All
Team LeyJun	63	(Japan) "Osamu"	Reynard 99L; Lola B99/51	1–3
Team LeyJun	63	(Japan) Shinsuke Shibahara	Reynard 99L; Lola B99/51	6–10
PIAA Nakajima Racing	64	(Netherlands) Tom Coronel	Reynard 99L	All
PIAA Nakajima Racing	65	(Japan) Hidetoshi Mitsusada	Reynard 99L	All
DoCoMo Team Dandelion Racing	68	(Argentina) Rubén Derfler	Reynard 99L	All

== Race calendar and results ==
All races were held in Japan.

Race	Track	Date	Pole position	Fastest Race Lap	Winning driver	Winning team
1	Suzuka Circuit	18 April	(Japan) Hidetoshi Mitsusada	(Japan) Satoshi Motoyama	(Japan) Satoshi Motoyama	Unlimited Racing Team LeMans
2	Twin Ring Motegi	9 May	(Netherlands) Tom Coronel	(Republic of Ireland) Ralph Firman Jr.	(Japan) Hidetoshi Mitsusada	PIAA Nakajima Racing
3	Mine Circuit	23 May	(Japan) Satoshi Motoyama	(Republic of Ireland) Ralph Firman Jr.	(Japan) Satoshi Motoyama	Unlimited Racing Team LeMans
4	Fuji Speedway	6 June	(United Kingdom) Peter Dumbreck	(Japan) Koji Yamanishi	(Netherlands) Tom Coronel	PIAA Nakajima Racing
5	Suzuka Circuit	4 July	(Japan) Satoshi Motoyama	(Netherlands) Tom Coronel	(Japan) Masami Kageyama	Be Brides Team Impul
6	Sportsland SUGO	1 August	(Netherlands) Tom Coronel	(Japan) Satoshi Motoyama	(Netherlands) Tom Coronel	PIAA Nakajima Racing
7	Fuji Speedway	5 September	(Netherlands) Tom Coronel	(Japan) Satoshi Motoyama	(Netherlands) Tom Coronel	PIAA Nakajima Racing
8	Mine Circuit	19 September	(Netherlands) Tom Coronel	(Japan) Hidetoshi Mitsusada	(Japan) Hidetoshi Mitsusada	PIAA Nakajima Racing
9	Twin Ring Motegi	3 October	(Japan) Satoshi Motoyama	(Japan) Hideki Noda	(Japan) Satoshi Motoyama	Unlimited Racing Team LeMans
10	Suzuka-East Circuit	14 November	(Republic of Ireland) Ralph Firman Jr.	(Japan) Yuji Tachikawa	(Republic of Ireland) Ralph Firman Jr.	Shionogi Team Nova

== Championship standings ==
=== Drivers' Championship ===
Scoring system

Position	1st	2nd	3rd	4th	5th	6th
Points	10	6	4	3	2	1

Rank	Name	SUZ	MOT	MIN	FUJ	SUZ	SGO	FUJ	MIN	MOT	SUZ	Points
1	(Netherlands) Tom Coronel	2	Ret	3	1	2	1	1	Ret	3	Ret	50
2	(Japan) Satoshi Motoyama	1	2	1	Ret	Ret	2	3	Ret	1	Ret	46
3	(Japan) Hidetoshi Mitsusada	3	1	8	10	5	11	4	1	5	9	31
4	(Republic of Ireland) Ralph Firman Jr.	Ret	3	2	9	Ret	6	10	9	8	1	21
5	(Germany) Michael Krumm		5	Ret	3	11	4	9	4	Ret	2	18
6	(Japan) Masami Kageyama	Ret	Ret	6	12	1	Ret	Ret	Ret	4	4	17
7	(United Kingdom) Peter Dumbreck	4	6	5	2	Ret	Ret	5	5	10	10	16
8	(Japan) Juichi Wakisaka	Ret	15	10	Ret	9	5	2	3	11	3	16
9	(Japan) Takuya Kurosawa	Ret	Ret	12	5	3	3					10
10	(Japan) Ryō Michigami	6	8	7	8	Ret	Ret	7	Ret	2	5	9
11	(Japan) Hideki Noda	Ret	16	13	14	6	Ret	Ret	2	9	11	7
12	(Japan) Koji Yamanishi	DNS	DNS	4	4	8	9	8	Ret	Ret	Ret	6
13	(Japan) Yuji Tachikawa	5	4	Ret	7	7	Ret	Ret	Ret	6	8	6
14	(Japan) Tetsuya Tanaka	Ret				4	Ret	11	Ret	14	Ret	3
15	(Germany) Dominik Schwager	Ret	7	Ret	6	Ret	7					1
16	(Japan) Katsutomo Kaneishi	9	Ret	Ret	11	Ret	8	6	Ret	Ret	7	1
17	(Japan) Masahiko Kageyama	Ret	12	Ret	13	Ret	13	Ret	6	12	13	1
18	(Japan) Hiroki Katoh	Ret	10	Ret	15	10	12	12	Ret	7	6	1
19	(Japan) Atsushi Kawamoto	8	Ret	11	18	13	Ret	13	7	Ret	16	0
20	(Japan) Akira Iida	7	Ret	Ret	16	Ret	10	Ret	Ret	13	12	0
21	(Japan) Shinsuke Shibahara						Ret	Ret	8	15	14	0
22	(Argentina) Rubén Derfler	Ret	11	9	17	12	14	Ret	Ret	Ret	15	0
23	(Japan) Shigekazu Wakisaka	Ret	9	Ret								0
24	(Japan) Tetsuji Tamanaka	Ret		14	19	14	Ret	Ret	10	Ret	17	0
25	(Japan) Masahiko Kondo	Ret	13	Ret								0
26	(Japan) "Osamu"	Ret	14	Ret								0

=== Teams' Championship ===
Rank	Name	Car	SUZ	MOT	MIN	FUJ	SUZ	SGO	FUJ	MIN	MOT	SUZ	Points
1	PIAA Nakajima	64	2	Ret	3	1	2	1	1	Ret	3	Ret	81
1	PIAA Nakajima	65	3	1	8	10	5	11	4	1	5	9	81
2	Unlimited LeMans	1	1	2	1	Ret	Ret	2	3	Ret	1	Ret	52
2	Unlimited LeMans	2	DNS	DNS	4	4	8	9	8	Ret	Ret	Ret	52
3	Be Brides Impul	19	Ret	Ret	6	12	1	Ret	Ret	Ret	4	4	24
3	Be Brides Impul	20	Ret	16	13	14	6	Ret	Ret	2	9	11	24
4	Shionogi Nova	9	Ret	3	2	9	Ret	6	10	9	8	1	22
4	Shionogi Nova	10	Ret	10	Ret	15	10	12	12	Ret	7	6	22
5	5ZIGEN	5	Ret	9	Ret		4	Ret	11	Ret	14	Ret	21
5	5ZIGEN	6	Ret	5	Ret	3	11	4	9	4	Ret	2	21
6	ARTA	55	9	Ret	Ret	11	Ret	8	6	Ret	Ret	7	17
6	ARTA	56	Ret	15	10	Ret	9	5	2	3	11	3	17
7	Team LeyJun	62	4	6	5	2	Ret	Ret	5	5	10	10	16
7	Team LeyJun	63	Ret	14	Ret			Ret	Ret	8	15	14	16
8	Team TMS	17	Ret	7	Ret	6	Ret	7					11
8	Team TMS	18	Ret	Ret	12	5	3	3					11
9	Speedmaster Mooncraft	14	6	8	7	8	Ret	Ret	7	Ret	2	5	10
9	Speedmaster Mooncraft	15	Ret	12	Ret	13	Ret	13	Ret	6	12	13	10
10	Cosmo Oil Cerumo	11	5	4	Ret	7	7	Ret	Ret	Ret	6	8	6
10	Cosmo Oil Cerumo	12	7	Ret	Ret	16	Ret	10	Ret	Ret	13	12	6
11	Asahi Kiko Sports	3	8	Ret	11	18	13	Ret	13	7	Ret	16	0
12	DoCoMo Dandelion	68	Ret	11	9	17	12	14	Ret	Ret	Ret	15	0
13	Takagi B-1 Racing	36	Ret		14	19	14	Ret	Ret	10	Ret	17	0
14	Mirai	32	Ret	13	Ret								0
