= Rubén Derfler =

Argentine racing driver (born 1976)

- Nationality: Argentine
- Born: June 2, 1976 (age 50) General Ramírez, Entre Ríos, Argentina

Previous series
- 2000 1999 1998 1997 1996 1995 1994 1993: TC2000 Championship; JGTC; Formula Nippon; Japanese F3 Championship; JTCC; Formula Toyota; F3 Sudamericana; Formula Renault Argentina

Championship titles
- 1997: Formula Toyota

Rubén Derfler (born 2 June 1976) is an Argentine former racing driver. He has competed in such series as the Japanese Touring Car Championship, Formula Nippon and TC2000 Championship. He won the 1997 Formula Toyota season and was runner-up of Formula Renault Argentina in 1995. In 2000, Derfler returned to Argentina to race in TC2000 before retiring from motorsport.

== Racing record ==
=== Career summary ===
Season	Series	Team	Races	Wins	Poles	F/Laps	Podiums	Points	Position
1993	Formula Renault Argentina		?	0	0	0	0	1	37th
1994	Formula Renault Argentina		?	0	0	0	0	35	11th
1995	Formula Renault Argentina		14	2	1	1	5	113	**2nd**
1996	Formula 3 Sudamericana		?	0	0	0	0	3	20th
1997	Formula Toyota		10	3	?	?	8	129	**1st**
1998	Japanese Touring Car Championship	Dandelion Racing	11	0	0	0	1	62	8th
1998	Japanese Formula 3 Championship	Masahiko Kondō Racing	9	0	0	0	0	5	9th
1999	Formula Nippon	DoCoMo Team Dandelion Racing	9	0	0	0	0	0	22nd
1999	All Japan Grand Touring Car Championship	Team Taeibon Ralliart	1	0	0	0	0	0	NC
2000	TC2000 Championship	Pierandrei Team	11	0	0	0	0	5	22nd

=== Complete JTCC results ===
(key) (Races in bold indicate pole position) (Races in italics indicate fastest lap)

Year	Team	Car	1	2	3	4	5	6	7	8	9	10	11	DC	Points
1998	Dandelion Racing	Toyota Corona EXiV	FUJ; 1; 4	FUJ; 2 Ret	MOT; 8	SUG; 1 Ret	SUG; 2; 5	SUZ; 1; 6	SUZ; 2 Ret	MIN; 1; 6	MIN; 2; 6	TAI; 5	FUJ; 2	8th	62

=== Complete Formula Nippon results ===
(key) (Races in bold indicate pole position) (Races in italics indicate fastest lap)

Year	Entrant	1	2	3	4	5	6	7	8	9	10	DC	Points
1999	DoCoMo Team Dandelion Racing	SUZ; Ret	MOT; 11	MIN; 9	FUJ; 17	SUZ; 12	SUG; 14	FUJ; Ret	MIN; Ret	MOT; Ret	SUZ; 15	22nd	0

=== Complete JGTC results ===
(key) (Races in bold indicate pole position) (Races in italics indicate fastest lap)

Year	Team	Car	Class	1	2	3	4	5	6	7	8	DC	Points
1999	Team Taeibon Ralliart	Mitsubishi FTO	GT300	SUZ	FUJ; Ret	SUG	MIN	FUJ	TAI	MOT	AUT	NC	0

Sporting positions
Preceded by Yasuhisa Fujiwara	Formula Toyota Main Series; Champion; 1997	Succeeded by Masahiro Tsukiji
