= Norio Matsubara =

Norio Matsubara (born 1968, Paraná) is a former racing driver. He is a Brazilian of Japanese descent.

== Titles and Competitions ==
- Brazilian Formula Ford champion in 1992.
- Sudan Formula 3 frontrunner (6th) won Goiania race 1993.
- Intercontinental Formula 3000 - Omegaland 1994.
