= 1992 Monaco Grand Prix Formula Three =

1992 Monaco Grand Prix
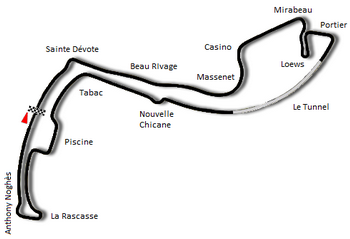

Race details
- Date: 30 May 1992
- Official name: 34ème GRAND PRIX DE "MONACO F3"
- Location: Circuit de Monaco, Monte Carlo
- Course: Temporary street circuit
- Course length: 3.328 km (2.068 miles)
- Distance: 24 laps, 259.584 km (161.298 miles)
- Weather: Dry

Pole position
Driver	(Brazil) Niko Palhares	Team Tatuus
- Time: 1:35.982

Fastest lap
Driver	(France) Jean-Christophe Boullion	Jean-Christophe Boullion
- Time: 1:36.646

Results from the 1992 Monaco Grand Prix Formula Three held at Monte Carlo on May 30, 1992, in the Circuit de Monaco. The race was a support of the 1992 Monaco Grand Prix of Formula 1.

== Classification ==
Pos	Driver	Constructor	Laps	Time/Retired
1	(Germany) Marco Werner	Ralt RT36-Opel	24	39:24.882
2	(Italy) Andrea Gilardi	Dallara F392-Alfa Romeo	24	39:27.023
3	(Italy) Giampiero Simoni	Dallara F392-Alfa Romeo	24	39:27.581
4	(Italy) Roberto Colciago	Dallara F392-Alfa Romeo	24	39:42.019
5	(Italy) Massimiliano Papis	Dallara F392-Volkswagen	24	39:44.223
6	(Italy) Gianantonio Pacchioni	Dallara F392-Alfa Romeo	24	39:49.001
7	(France) Jean-Christophe Boullion	Bowman BC2-Volkswagen	24	39:53.696
8	(Germany) Sascha Maassen	Ralt RT36-Volkswagen	24	39:53.696
9	(Canada) Jacques Villeneuve	Dallara F392-Alfa Romeo	24	40:01.302
10	(Italy) Fabrizio Bettini	Dallara F392-Alfa Romeo	24	40:01.451
11	(France) Richard Favero	Dallara F392-Alfa Romeo	24	40:15.277
12	(Australia) Russell Ingall	Dallara F392-Opel	24	40:15.643
13	(Germany) Michael Krumm	Ralt RT36-Opel	24	40:22.566
14	(Italy) Christian Pescatori	Dallara F392-Alfa Romeo	24	40:38.497
15	(Canada) Stéphane Proulx	Dallara F392-Alfa Romeo	23	
16	(Portugal) Diogo Castro Santos	Ralt RT36-Volkswagen	23	
17	(France) Emmanuel Clérico	Dallara F392-Opel	23	
DNF	(France) Guillaume Gomez	Ralt RT36-Alfa Romeo	19	
DNF	(France) Olivier Thévenin	Ralt RT36-Volkswagen	19	
DNF	(Portugal) Pedro Lamy	Reynard 923-Opel	15	
DNF	(Italy) Mirko Savoldi	Dallara F392-Alfa Romeo	13	
DNF	(Brazil) Niko Palhares	Dallara F392-Mugen	12	
DNF	(Italy) Marcello Ventre	Dallara F392-Alfa Romeo	10	
DNF	(Italy) Massimiliano Angelelli	Dallara F392-Opel	10	
DNF	(France) Stephane Fédon	Ralt RT36-Alfa Romeo	7	
DNF	(Austria) Philipp Peter	Dallara F392-Alfa Romeo-Mugen	3	
