= 1993 EFDA Nations Cup =

Seasons
- ← 1992 1994 →

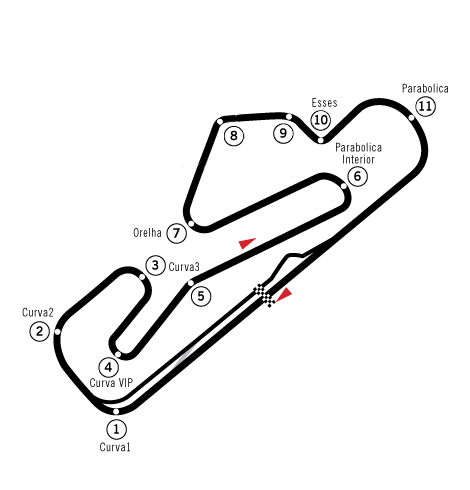
Layout of the Autódromo do Estoril (1972–1993)

The EFDA Nations Cup, was a Country vs Country competition for Formula Opel cars between 1990 and 1998. It had always been Dan Partel's dream to stage a race that pitted drivers in equal cars racing for their country. The Formula Opel/Vauxhall one make racing series offered the best opportunity for such an event.

The 1993 EFDA Nations Cup (Nations Cup IV), was held at Estoril, Portugal (3 October 1993).

== Final positions ==
Position	Country	Driver 1	Driver 2
1	Austria	Martin Albrecht	Hubert Stromberger
2	Belgium	Vincent Radermecker	Wim Eyckmans
3	Brazil	Tony Kanaan	Luiz Garcia Jr.
4	San Marino	Oliver Martini	Matteo Calestani
5	Sweden	Peter Hallen	Mikael Kinnmark
6	Italy	Patrick Crinelli	Sandro Spolodore
7	Portugal	Pedro Couceiro	Manuel Gião
8	United Nations	Carl Rosenblad	Freddy Van Beuren
9	Netherlands	Donny Crevels	Gerard van de Kammen
10	Ireland	Wayne Douglas	Vivion Daly
11	Argentina	Norberto Fontana	Adrian Hang
12	Estonia	Rain Pilve	Guido Almere
13	Germany	Klaus Panchyrz	Jens Nothelle
14	France	Phillippe Carlier	Benjamin Mahé
15	Norway	Tommy Rustad	Lars Svelander
