= 1992 Masters of Formula 3 =

Race details
Date	2 August 1992
Official name	Marlboro Masters of Formula 3
Location	Circuit Park Zandvoort, Netherlands
Course	2.519 km (1.565 mi)
Distance	35 laps, 88.165 km (54.783 mi)

Pole
Driver	(United Kingdom) Kelvin Burt	Fortec Motorsport
Time	1:00.906

Fastest Lap
Driver	(United Kingdom) Kelvin Burt	Fortec Motorsport
Time	1:01.043 (on lap 11 of 35)

Podium
First	(Portugal) Pedro Lamy	Opel Team WTS
Second	(Portugal) Diogo Castro Santos	Volkswagen Motorsport
Third	(Brazil) Gil de Ferran	Paul Stewart Racing

The 1992 Marlboro Masters of Formula 3 was the second Masters of Formula 3 race held at Circuit Park Zandvoort on 2 August 1992. It was won by Pedro Lamy, for Opel Team WTS.

== Drivers and teams ==
1992 Entry List
Team	No	Driver	Chassis	Engine	Main series
(United Kingdom) Paul Stewart Racing	1	(Brazil) Gil de Ferran	Reynard 923	Mugen-Honda	British Formula 3
(United Kingdom) Paul Stewart Racing	2	(Sweden) Niclas Jönsson	Reynard 923	Mugen-Honda	Swedish Formula Three
(United Kingdom) West Surrey Racing	3	(Belgium) Marc Goossens	Reynard 923	Mugen-Honda	British Formula 3
(United Kingdom) West Surrey Racing	4	(Brazil) Oswaldo Negri	Reynard 923	Mugen-Honda	British Formula 3
(France) Graff Racing	5	(France) Jean-Christophe Boullion	Bowman BC2	Volkswagen	French Formula Three
(United Kingdom) Edenbridge Racing	6	(Brazil) Pedro Diniz	Ralt RT36	Mugen-Honda	British Formula 3
(United Kingdom) Edenbridge Racing	7	(United Kingdom) Warren Hughes	Ralt RT36	Vauxhall	British Formula 3
(United Kingdom) Alan Docking Racing	8	(Belgium) Philippe Adams	Ralt RT36	Mugen-Honda	British Formula 3
(United Kingdom) Alan Docking Racing	9	(United States) Elton Julian	Ralt RT36	Mugen-Honda	British Formula 3
(Italy) Team Ghinzani	10	(Italy) Gianluca de Lorenzi	Dallara F392	Alfa Romeo	
(Italy) Team Ghinzani	11	(Switzerland) Gianmaria Regazzoni	Dallara F392	Alfa Romeo	Italian Formula Three
(Germany) Opel Team WTS	12	(Portugal) Pedro Lamy	Reynard 923	Opel	German Formula Three
(Germany) Volkswagen Motorsport	14	(Portugal) Diogo Castro Santos	Ralt RT36	Volkswagen	German Formula Three
(Germany) Volkswagen Motorsport	15	(Germany) Sascha Maassen	Ralt RT36	Volkswagen	German Formula Three
(United Kingdom) Fortec Motorsport	16	(United Kingdom) Kelvin Burt	Reynard 923	Mugen-Honda	British Formula 3
(Italy) Tatuus	17	(Brazil) Niko Palhares	Dallara F392	Mugen-Honda	Italian Formula Three
(Germany) G+M Motorsport	18	(Germany) Michael Krumm	Ralt RT36	Opel	German Formula Three
(Germany) G+M Motorsport	19	(Germany) Marco Werner	Ralt RT36	Opel	German Formula Three
(Italy) RC Motorsport	20	(Italy) Massimiliano Angelelli	Dallara F392	Opel	Italian Formula Three
(Italy) RC Motorsport	21	(Italy) Giancarlo Grieco	Dallara F392	Opel	Italian Formula Three
(Italy) Traini Corse	22	(Italy) Vincenzo Sospiri	Dallara 392	Mugen-Honda	Italian Formula Three
(France) KTR Racing	24	(Netherlands) Allard Kalff	Ralt RT36	Volkswagen	French Formula Three
(France) KTR Racing	25	(France) Nicolas Leboissetier	Ralt RT36	Volkswagen	
(Sweden) Team Itchi Ban	26	(Sweden) Mikael Gustavsson	Reynard 913	Mugen-Honda	Swedish Formula Three
(Sweden) Claes Rothstein Motorsport	28	(Sweden) Peter Aslund	Ralt RT35	Volkswagen	Swedish Formula Three
(Sweden) Claes Rothstein Motorsport	29	(Sweden) Claes Rothstein	Ralt RT33	Volkswagen	Swedish Formula Three
(Netherlands) Nomag Racing	30	(Netherlands) Alex Veenman	Ralt RT33	Volkswagen	
(Netherlands) Nomag Racing	31	(Netherlands) Frank ten Wolde	Van Diemen RF92	Mugen	German Formula Three
(Austria) RSM Marko	32	(Germany) Claudia Hürtgen	Reynard 923	Alfa Romeo	German Formula Three
(Austria) RSM Marko	33	(Germany) Jörg Müller	Reynard 923	Alfa Romeo	German Formula Three
(Switzerland) Jacques Isler Racing	37	(Austria) Philipp Peter	Dallara F392	Alfa Romeo	German Formula Three
(Switzerland) Jacques Isler Racing	38	(Austria) Mercedes Stermitz	Dallara F392	Alfa Romeo	German Formula Three

== Classification ==
=== Qualifying ===
Pos	No	Name	Team	Time	Gap
1	16	(United Kingdom) Kelvin Burt	Fortec Motorsport	1:00.906	
2	12	(Portugal) Pedro Lamy	Opel Team WTS	1:00.955	+0.049
3	14	(Portugal) Diogo Castro Santos	Volkswagen Motorsport	1:00.974	+0.068
4	18	(Germany) Michael Krumm	G+M Motorsport	1:00.978	+0.072
5	33	(Germany) Jörg Müller	RSM Marko	1:01.147	+0.241
6	19	(Germany) Marco Werner	G+M Motorsport	1:01.221	+0.315
7	28	(Sweden) Peter Aslund	Claes Rothstein Motorsport	1:01.246	+0.340
8	1	(Brazil) Gil de Ferran	Paul Stewart Racing	1:01.252	+0.346
9	15	(Germany) Sascha Maassen	Volkswagen Motorsport	1:01.443	+0.537
10	32	(Germany) Claudia Hürtgen	RSM Marko	1:01.462	+0.556
11	22	(Italy) Vincenzo Sospiri	Traini Corse	1:01.495	+0.589
12	4	(Brazil) Oswaldo Negri	West Surrey Racing	1:01.507	+0.601
13	31	(Netherlands) Frank ten Wolde	Nomag Racing	1:01.545	+0.639
14	7	(United Kingdom) Warren Hughes	Edenbridge Racing	1:01.612	+0.706
15	8	(Belgium) Philippe Adams	Alan Docking Racing	1:01.667	+0.761
16	3	(Belgium) Marc Goossens	West Surrey Racing	1:01.738	+0.832
17	17	(Brazil) Niko Palhares	Tatuus	1:01.759	+0.853
18	37	(Austria) Philipp Peter	Jacques Isler Racing	1:01.815	+0.909
19	5	(France) Jean-Christophe Boullion	Graff Racing	1:01.830	+0.924
20	25	(France) Nicolas Leboissetier	KTR Racing	1:01.912	+1.006
21	2	(Sweden) Niclas Jönsson	Paul Stewart Racing	1:01.969	+1.063
22	9	(United States) Elton Julian	Alan Docking Racing	1:01.975	+1.069
23	20	(Italy) Massimiliano Angelelli	RC Motorsport	1:02.062	+1.156
24	6	(Brazil) Pedro Diniz	Edenbridge Racing	1:02.344	+1.438
25	21	(Italy) Giancarlo Grieco	RC Motorsport	1:02.350	+1.444
26	30	(Netherlands) Alex Veenman	Nomag Racing	1:02.392	+1.486
27	10	(Italy) Gianluca de Lorenzi	Team Ghinzani	1:02.451	+1.545
28	26	(Sweden) Mikael Gustavsson	Team Itchi Ban	1:02.588	+1.682
29	24	(Netherlands) Allard Kalff	KTR Racing	1:02.710	+1.804
30	29	(Sweden) Claes Rothstein	Claes Rothstein Motorsport	1:02.758	+1.852
31	11	(Switzerland) Gianmaria Regazzoni	Team Ghinzani	1:03.143	+2.237
32	38	(Austria) Mercedes Stermitz	Jacques Isler Racing	1:03.207	+2.301

=== Race ===
Pos	No	Driver	Team	Laps	Time/Retired	Grid
1	12	(Portugal) Pedro Lamy	Opel Team WTS	35	36:14.889	2
2	14	(Portugal) Diogo Castro Santos	Volkswagen Motorsport	35	+0.059	3
3	1	(Brazil) Gil de Ferran	Paul Stewart Racing	35	+9.844	8
4	18	(Germany) Michael Krumm	G+M Motorsport	35	+11.359	4
5	15	(Germany) Sascha Maassen	Volkswagen Motorsport	35	+12.102	9
6	4	(Brazil) Oswaldo Negri	West Surrey Racing	35	+14.048	12
7	22	(Italy) Vincenzo Sospiri	Traini Corse	35	+16.579	6
8	7	(United Kingdom) Warren Hughes	Edenbridge Racing	35	+19.611	14
9	8	(Belgium) Philippe Adams	Alan Docking Racing	35	+20.386	15
10	3	(Belgium) Marc Goossens	West Surrey Racing	35	+20.853	16
11	20	(Italy) Massimiliano Angelelli	RC Motorsport	35	+23.655	23
12	32	(Germany) Claudia Hürtgen	RSM Marko	35	+33.299	10
13	25	(France) Nicolas Leboissetier	KTR Racing	35	+34.387	20
14	17	(Brazil) Niko Palhares	Tatuus	35	+40.209	17
15	2	(Sweden) Niclas Jönsson	Paul Stewart Racing	35	+42.530	21
16	37	(Austria) Philipp Peter	Jacques Isler Racing	35	+43.322	18
17	21	(Italy) Giancarlo Grieco	RC Motorsport	35	+43.580	25
18	11	(Switzerland) Gianmaria Regazzoni	Team Ghinzani	34	+1 Lap	31
19	26	(Sweden) Mikael Gustavsson	Team Itchi Ban	34	+1 Lap	28
20	6	(Brazil) Pedro Diniz	Edenbridge Racing	34	+1 Lap	24
21	10	(Italy) Gianluca de Lorenzi	Team Ghinzani	34	+1 Lap	27
22	29	(Sweden) Claes Rothstein	Claes Rothstein Motorsport	34	+1 Lap	30
23	38	(Austria) Mercedes Stermitz	Jacques Isler Racing	34	+1 Lap	32
24	31	(Netherlands) Frank ten Wolde	Nomag Racing	31	Retired	13
25	16	(United Kingdom) Kelvin Burt	Fortec Motorsport	29	Retired	1
26	24	(Netherlands) Allard Kalff	KTR Racing	29	Retired	29
Ret	33	(Germany) Jörg Müller	RSM Marko	21	Retired	5
Ret	28	(Sweden) Peter Aslund	Claes Rothstein Motorsport	14	Retired	7
Ret	19	(Germany) Marco Werner	G+M Motorsport	2	Retired	6
Ret	30	(Netherlands) Alex Veenman	Nomag Racing	2	Retired	26
Ret	5	(France) Jean-Christophe Boullion	Graff Racing	0	Retired	19
Ret	9	(United States) Elton Julian	Alan Docking Racing	0	Retired	22
Fastest lap and lap record: Kelvin Burt, 1:01.043, 148.558 km/h (92.310 mph) on lap 11
