= 1997 EFDA Nations Cup =

Seasons
- ← 1996 1998 →

Layout of the Donington Park

The EFDA Nations Cup, was a Country vs Country competition for Formula Opel cars between 1990 and 1998. It had always been Dan Partel's dream to stage a race that pitted drivers in equal cars racing for their country. The Formula Opel/Vauxhall one make racing series offered the best opportunity for such an event.

The 1997 EFDA Nations Cup (Nations Cup VIII), was held at Donington Park, England (18/19 October 1997).

== Final positions ==
Position	Country	Driver 1	Driver 2
1	Italy	Giovanni Montanari	Giovanni Anapoli
2	Brazil	Marcello Battistuzzi	Wagner Ebrahim
3	Germany	Marko Stipp	Jorg Bergmeister
4	European Union	Warren Carway	Justin Wilson
5	United States	Buddy Rice	Matt Sielsky
6	Austria	Hubert Stromberger	Walter Thimmler
7	Great Britain	Adam Wilcox	Stuart Mosley
8	Ireland	Vivion Daly	Mark Kershaw
9	Netherlands	Sandor Van Es	Sepp Koster
10	United Nations	Andrea Piccini	Tony Bertocchi
11	Nordic	Hannu Viinikainen	Andreas Bostrom
12	South America	Fabricio Masullo	Luciano Zanguirolani
13	Australia	Stephen White	Ian Agnew
