= 1993 Masters of Formula 3 =

Formula 3 race

Race details
Date	1 August 1993
Official name	Marlboro Masters of Formula 3
Location	Circuit Zandvoort, Netherlands
Course	2.519 km (1.565 mi)
Distance	35 laps, 88.165 km (54.783 mi)

Pole
Driver	(Netherlands) Jos Verstappen	Opel Team WTS
Time	1:01.066

Fastest Lap
Driver	(Germany) Michael Krumm	G+M Escom Motorsport
Time	1:01.241 (on lap 14 of 35)

Podium
First	(Netherlands) Jos Verstappen	Opel Team WTS
Second	(Italy) Paolo Coloni	Coloni Motorsport
Third	(Germany) Michael Krumm	G+M Escom Motorsport

The 1993 Marlboro Masters of Formula 3 was the third Masters of Formula 3 race held at Circuit Zandvoort on 1 August 1993. It was won by Jos Verstappen, for Opel Team WTS.

== Drivers and teams ==
1993 Entry List
Team	No	Driver	Chassis	Engine	Main series
(Germany) Opel Team WTS	1	(Netherlands) Jos Verstappen	Dallara F393	Opel	German Formula Three
(Germany) Opel Team WTS	2	(Germany) Alexander Grau	Dallara F393	Opel	German Formula Three
(United Kingdom) West Surrey Racing	3	(Spain) Pedro de la Rosa	Reynard 933	Mugen-Honda	British Formula 3
(United Kingdom) West Surrey Racing	4	(Belgium) Marc Goossens	Reynard 933	Mugen-Honda	British Formula 3
(Italy) Tatuus	6	(Italy) Gianantonio Pacchioni	Dallara F393	Fiat	Italian Formula Three
(Italy) Tatuus	7	(Netherlands) Tom Coronel	Dallara F393	Fiat	Formula Ford 1600 Netherlands
(Germany) Volkswagen Motorsport	10	(Germany) Sascha Maassen	Dallara F393	Volkswagen	German Formula Three
(Germany) Volkswagen Motorsport	11	(Italy) Massimiliano Angelelli	Dallara F393	Volkswagen	German Formula Three
(Italy) RC Motorsport	14	(Argentina) Javier Balzano	Dallara F393	Opel	
(Italy) RC Motorsport	15	(Italy) Roberto Colciago	Dallara F393	Opel	German Formula Three
(France) Serge Saulnier	17	(France) Emmanuel Clérico	Dallara F393	Opel	French Formula Three
(France) KTR Racing	18	(France) Christophe Tinseau	Bowman BC3	Volkswagen	French Formula Three
(France) KTR Racing	49	(Netherlands) Martijn Koene	Bowman BC3	Volkswagen	French Formula Three
(Germany) G+M Escom Motorsport	19	(Germany) Michael Krumm	Dallara F393	Opel	German Formula Three
(Germany) G+M Escom Motorsport	20	(Germany) Michael Graf	Dallara F393	Opel	German Formula Three
(Switzerland) Jacques Isler Racing	21	(Austria) Philipp Peter	Dallara F393	Fiat	German Formula Three
(Switzerland) Jacques Isler Racing	22	(Germany) Dino Lamby	Dallara F393	Fiat	German Formula Three
(United Kingdom) Edenbridge Racing with Vauxhall	24	(United Kingdom) Oliver Gavin	Dallara F393	Vauxhall	British Formula 3
(United Kingdom) Edenbridge Racing with Vauxhall	25	(Brazil) Marcos Gueiros	Dallara F393	Vauxhall	British Formula 3
(Italy) Supercars CM	26	(Italy) Christian Pescatori	Dallara F393	Fiat	Italian Formula Three
(Italy) Supercars CM	27	(Italy) Alberto Pedemonte	Dallara F393	Fiat	Italian Formula Three
(Sweden) Claes Rothstein Motorsport	30	(Sweden) Claes Rothstein	Ralt RT36	Volkswagen	Nordic Formula Three
(Italy) Prema Racing	31	(Italy) Fabrizio de Simone	Dallara F393	Fiat	Italian Formula Three
(Italy) Prema Racing	32	(Italy) Davide Campana	Dallara F393	Fiat	Italian Formula Three
(United Kingdom) Fortec Motorsport	33	(Brazil) André Ribeiro	Reynard 933	Mugen-Honda	British Formula 3
(United Kingdom) Fortec Motorsport	34	(United Kingdom) Gareth Rees	Reynard 933	Mugen-Honda	British Formula 3
(Austria) Marko RSM	36	(Germany) Jörg Müller	Dallara F393	Fiat	German Formula Three
(Austria) Marko RSM	37	(Austria) Alexander Wurz	Dallara F393	Fiat	German Formula Three
(Switzerland) KMS	38	(United States) Markus Liesner	Dallara F393	Opel	German Formula Three
(Switzerland) KMS	39	(Switzerland) Gianmaria Regazzoni	Dallara F393	Opel	German Formula Three
(Netherlands) Carly Motors BMW Team	40	(Netherlands) Peter Kox	Dallara F393	Opel	German Formula Three
(Italy) Coloni Motorsport	41	(Italy) Paolo Coloni	Dallara F393	Fiat	Italian Formula Three
(Germany) Abt Motorsport	42	(Germany) Christian Abt	Dallara F393	Opel	German Formula Three
(Italy) Team Ghinzani	43	(Italy) Luca Rangoni	Dallara F393	Fiat	Italian Formula Three
(Italy) Team Ghinzani	44	(Brazil) Flavio Figueiredo	Dallara F393	Fiat	Italian Formula Three
(Germany) Elf Team Formel 3	45	(Germany) Marco Werner	Dallara F393	Opel	German Formula Three
(Italy) Roberto Carta	47	(Italy) Roberto Carta	Dallara F392	Volkswagen	Italian Formula Three

== Classification ==
=== Qualifying ===
Pos	No	Name	Team	Time	Gap
1	1	(Netherlands) Jos Verstappen	Opel Team WTS	1:01.066	
2	41	(Italy) Paolo Coloni	Coloni Motorsport	1:01.073	+0.007
3	19	(Germany) Michael Krumm	G+M Escom Motorsport	1:01.088	+0.022
4	36	(Germany) Jörg Müller	Marko RSM	1:01.311	+0.245
5	15	(Italy) Roberto Colciago	RC Motorsport	1:01.352	+0.286
6	11	(Italy) Massimiliano Angelelli	Volkswagen Motorsport	1:01.376	+0.310
7	4	(Belgium) Marc Goossens	West Surrey Racing	1:01.423	+0.357
8	10	(Germany) Sascha Maassen	Volkswagen Motorsport	1:01.509	+0.443
9	44	(Brazil) Flavio Figueiredo	Team Ghinzani	1:01.575	+0.509
10	6	(Italy) Gianantonio Pacchioni	Tatuus	1:01.674	+0.608
11	3	(Spain) Pedro de la Rosa	West Surrey Racing	1:01.700	+0.634
12	21	(Austria) Philipp Peter	Jacques Isler Racing	1:01.761	+0.695
13	26	(Italy) Christian Pescatori	Supercars CM	1:01.779	+0.713
14	45	(Germany) Marco Werner	Elf Team Formel 3	1:01.821	+0.755
15	38	(United States) Markus Liesner	KMS	1:01.885	+0.819
16	31	(Italy) Fabrizio de Simone	Prema Racing	1:01.910	+0.844
17	33	(Brazil) André Ribeiro	Fortec Motorsport	1:01.939	+0.873
18	43	(Italy) Luca Rangoni	Team Ghinzani	1:01.963	+0.897
19	7	(Netherlands) Tom Coronel	Tatuus	1:02.004	+0.938
20	27	(Italy) Alberto Pedemonte	Supercars CM	1:02.046	+0.980
21	20	(Germany) Michael Graf	G+M Escom Motorsport	1:02.052	+0.986
22	24	(United Kingdom) Oliver Gavin	Edenbridge Racing	1:02.118	+1.052
23	17	(France) Emmanuel Clérico	Serge Saulnier	1:02.119	+1.053
24	2	(Germany) Alexander Grau	Opel Team WTS	1:02.170	+1.104
25	34	(United Kingdom) Gareth Rees	Fortec Motorsport	1:02.199	+1.133
26	37	(Austria) Alexander Wurz	Marko RSM	1:02.232	+1.166
27	25	(Brazil) Marcos Gueiros	Edenbridge Racing	1:02.289	+1.223
28	14	(Argentina) Javier Balzano	RC Motorsport	1:02.322	+1.256
29	42	(Germany) Christian Abt	Abt Motorsport	1:02.453	+1.387
30	40	(Netherlands) Peter Kox	Carly Motors BMW Team	1:02.496	+1.430
31	32	(Italy) Davide Campana	Prema Racing	1:02.505	+1.439
32	18	(France) Christophe Tinseau	KTR Racing	1:02.541	+1.475
33	22	(Germany) Dino Lamby	Jacques Isler Racing	1:02.692	+1.626
34	39	(Switzerland) Gianmaria Regazzoni	KMS	1:02.939	+1.873
35	47	(Italy) Roberto Carta	Roberto Carta	1:02.996	+1.930
36	49	(Netherlands) Martijn Koene	KTR Racing	1:03.444	+2.378
37	30	(Sweden) Claes Rothstein	Claes Rothstein Motorsport	1:05.170	+4.104

=== Race ===
Pos	No	Driver	Team	Laps	Time/Retired	Grid
1	1	(Netherlands) Jos Verstappen	Opel Team WTS	35	36:16.649	1
2	41	(Italy) Paolo Coloni	Coloni Motorsport	35	+2.559	2
3	19	(Germany) Michael Krumm	G+M Escom Motorsport	35	+2.862	3
4	15	(Italy) Roberto Colciago	RC Motorsport	35	+6.795	5
5	4	(Belgium) Marc Goossens	West Surrey Racing	35	+7.407	7
6	11	(Italy) Massimiliano Angelelli	Volkswagen Motorsport	35	+8.941	6
7	6	(Italy) Gianantonio Pacchioni	Tatuus	35	+14.149	10
8	10	(Germany) Sascha Maassen	Volkswagen Motorsport	35	+17.297	8
9	3	(Spain) Pedro de la Rosa	West Surrey Racing	35	+19.395	11
10	31	(Italy) Fabrizio de Simone	Prema Racing	35	+40.132	16
11	45	(Germany) Marco Werner	Elf Team Formel 3	35	+40.670	14
12	27	(Italy) Alberto Pedemonte	Supercars CM	35	+40.947	20
13	17	(France) Emmanuel Clérico	Serge Saulnier	35	+41.743	23
14	21	(Austria) Philipp Peter	Jacques Isler Racing	35	+49.108	12
15	40	(Netherlands) Peter Kox	Carly Motors BMW Team	35	+49.426	30
16	2	(Germany) Alexander Grau	Opel Team WTS	35	+49.594	24
17	37	(Austria) Alexander Wurz	Marko RSM	35	+50.190	26
18	38	(United States) Markus Liesner	KMS	35	+1:02.553	15
19	34	(United Kingdom) Gareth Rees	Fortec Motorsport	35	+1:03.424	25
20	7	(Netherlands) Tom Coronel	Tatuus	35	+1:03.647	19
21	14	(Argentina) Javier Balzano	RC Motorsport	35	+1:13.839	28
22	18	(France) Christophe Tinseau	KTR Racing	35	+1:24.619	32
23	44	(Brazil) Flavio Figueiredo	Team Ghinzani	32	Retired	9
24	26	(Italy) Christian Pescatori	Supercars CM	31	Retired	13
25	20	(Germany) Michael Graf	G+M Escom Motorsport	30	Retired	21
Ret	25	(Brazil) Marcos Gueiros	Edenbridge Racing	27	Retired	27
Ret	43	(Italy) Luca Rangoni	Team Ghinzani	20	Retired	18
Ret	42	(Germany) Christian Abt	Abt Motorsport	15	Retired	29
Ret	36	(Germany) Jörg Müller	Marko RSM	12	Retired	4
Ret	32	(Italy) Davide Campana	Prema Racing	8	Retired	31
Ret	33	(Brazil) André Ribeiro	Fortec Motorsport	3	Retired	17
Ret	24	(United Kingdom) Oliver Gavin	Edenbridge Racing	2	Retired	22
DNQ	22	(Germany) Dino Lamby	Jacques Isler Racing			
DNQ	39	(Switzerland) Gianmaria Regazzoni	KMS			
DNQ	47	(Italy) Roberto Carta	Roberto Carta			
DNQ	49	(Netherlands) Martijn Koene	KTR Racing			
DNQ	30	(Sweden) Claes Rothstein	Claes Rothstein Motorsport			
Fastest lap: Michael Krumm, 1:01.241, 148.077 km/h (92.011 mph) on lap 14
