= 1990 EFDA Nations Cup =

Seasons
- ← none 1991 →

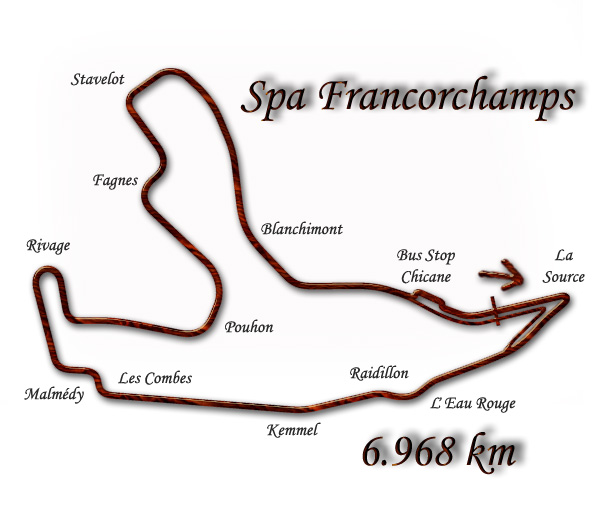
Layout of the Circuit de Spa-Francorchamps (1981-1993, 1995-2003)

The EFDA Nations Cup, was a Country vs Country competition for Formula Opel cars between 1990 and 1998. It had always been Dan Partel's dream to stage a race that pitted drivers in equal cars racing for their country. The Formula Opel/Vauxhall one make racing series offered the best opportunity for such an event.

The 1990 EFDA Nations Cup (Nation Cup I) was held at Spa-Francorchamps, Belgium (19–20 July 1990).

== Final positions ==
Position	Country	Driver 1	Driver 2
1	Portugal	Pedro Lamy	Diogo Castro Santos
2	Brazil	Rubens Barrichello	André Ribeiro
3	Sweden	Michael Johansson	Johan Rajamaki
4	Italy	Vincenzo Sospiri	Alberto Trezzi
5	West Germany	Michael Krumm	Joachim Beule
6	Switzerland	Cedric Reynard	Peter Honegger
7	Argentina	Jose Luis Di Palma	Patricio van Cayzeele
8	Belgium	Didier Defourny	Alain Plasch
9	Great Britain	David Coulthard	Nicky Hart
10	France	Gil de Ferran	Olivier Hulot
11	Denmark	Henrik Larsen	Erik Madsen
12	United States	Dennis Vitolo	Nick Firestone
13	Finland	Marko Mankonen	Hannu Rinne-Laturi
14	Netherlands	Allard Kalff	Marcel Albers
15	Norway	Torben Kvia	Kjetil Greve
16	East Germany	Steffan Goepel	Ralf Ahlert
17	Austria	Helmut Kopp	Philipp Peter
