= 1994 EFDA Nations Cup =

Seasons
- ← 1993 1995 →

Layout of the Circuit Park Zandvoort (1990-1998)

The EFDA Nations Cup, was a Country vs Country competition for Formula Opel cars between 1990 and 1998. It had always been Dan Partel's dream to stage a race that pitted drivers in equal cars racing for their country. The Formula Opel/Vauxhall one make racing series offered the best opportunity for such an event.

The 1994 EFDA Nations Cup (Nations Cup V), was held at Zandvoort, the Netherlands (24/25 September 1994).

Official ad

== Final positions ==
Position	Country	Driver 1	Driver 2
1	Netherlands	Tom Coronel	Donny Crevels
2	Austria	Hubert Stromberger	Walter Thimmler
3	Portugal	Gonçalo Gomes	Rui Águas
4	Denmark	Kirsten Kolby	Henrik Larsen
5	Sweden	Peter Hallen	Mikael Kinnmark
6	Great Britain	Jamie Davies	Guy Smith
7	Japan	Takashi Yokoyama	Yoshio Tsusuki
8	Norway	Tommy Rustad	Thomas Schie
9	Estonia	Tõnis Kasemets	Rain Pilve
10	United States	Zak Brown	Mary Kaczor
11	France	Claude-Yves Gosselin	Jean-Bernard Bouvet
12	Belgium	Kurt Mollekens	Max Weisenburger
13	Italy	Giovanni Anapoli	Alessandro Ferraresi
14	Croatia	Boris Zaller	Ellio Radola
15	Brazil	Sérgio Paese	Tony Kanaan
16	Australia	Stephen White	Paul Stokell
17	Spain	Miguel Ángel de Castro	David Bosch
18	Germany	Dirk Müller	Wolfgang Engels
