= 1995 EFDA Nations Cup =

Motorsport event

Seasons
- ← 1994 1996 →

Layout of the Circuit de Nevers Magny-Cours (1992-2002)

The EFDA Nations Cup, was a Country vs Country competition for Formula Opel cars between 1990 and 1998. It had always been Dan Partel's dream to stage a race that pitted drivers in equal cars racing for their country. The Formula Opel/Vauxhall one make racing series offered the best opportunity for such an event.

The 1995 EFDA Nations Cup (Nations Cup VI), was held at Magny-Cours, France (6–8 October 1995).

Official ad

== Final positions ==
Position	Country	Driver 1	Driver 2
1	Portugal	Manuel Gião	André Couto
2	Netherlands	Tom Coronel	Donny Crevels
3	Great Britain	Michael Duke	Peter Duke
4	France	Sébastien Mordillo	Bruno Laffite
5	Italy	Filippo Francioni	Marco Cioci
6	Germany	Patrick Simon	Jens Hainbach
7	Sweden	Pontus Morth	Karl Lindfors
8	Estonia	Rain Pilve	Tõnis Kasemets
9	Russia	Viktor Kozankov	Alexander Potechin
10	United Nations	Joost Boxoen	Michael Graham
11	Australia	Jason Bargwanna	Dugal McDougall
12	Austria	Walter Thimmler	Phillip Sager
13	Ireland	Donald Loughrey	Mark O'Connor
14	Norway	Torben Kvia	Joachim Johnson
