= 1991 EFDA Nations Cup =

Seasons
- ← 1990 1992 →

Layout of the Circuit Park Zandvoort (1990-1998)

The EFDA Nations Cup, was a Country vs Country competition for Formula Opel cars between 1990 and 1998. It had always been Dan Partel's dream to stage a race that pitted drivers in equal cars racing for their country. The Formula Opel/Vauxhall one make racing series offered the best opportunity for such an event.

The 1991 EFDA Nations Cup (Nations Cup II), was held at Zandvoort, Holland (15 September 1991).

Official Ad

== Final positions ==
Position	Country	Driver 1	Driver 2
1	Portugal	Pedro Lamy	Diogo Castro Santos
2	Germany	Michael Krumm	Helmut Schwitalla
3	Sweden	Michael Johansson	Magnus Wallinder
4	Switzerland	David Luyet	Peter Honegger
5	Brazil	Djalma Fogaça	Gualter Salles
6	Netherlands	Martin Koene	Ruud Spoolder
7	Great Britain	Gareth Rees	Jonathan McGall
8	Italy	Stefano Lovato	Guido Nannini
9	Belgium	Wim Eyckmans	Mario Bormans
10	Norway	Borre Skiaker	Torbin Kvia
11	Austria	Patrick Vallant	Christian Eigl
12	United States	Nick Firestone	Manfred Fitzgerald
13	Ireland	Vivion Daly	Sam Thompson
14	Denmark	Ina Neumann	Thomas Mullin
15	Saudi Arabia	Faisal Ali	Raad Aduljawad
16	Czechoslovakia	Michael Vesely	Karel Vesely
17	Hungary	Laszlo Szasz	Erno Richter
18	Asia	Ali Basakinci	Reza Rashidian
