= 1992 EFDA Nations Cup =

International formula opel competition

Seasons
- ← 1991 1993 →

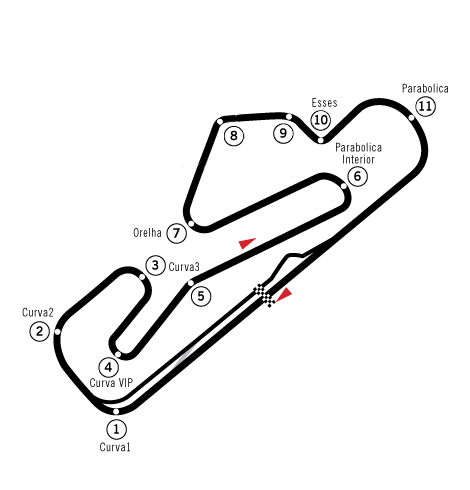
Layout of the Autódromo do Estoril (1972-1993)

The EFDA Nations Cup, was a Country vs Country competition for Formula Opel cars between 1990 and 1998. It had always been Dan Partel's dream to stage a race that pitted drivers in equal cars racing for their country. The Formula Opel/Vauxhall one make racing series offered the best opportunity for such an event.

The 1992 EFDA Nations Cup (Nations Cup III), was held at Estoril, Portugal (4 October 1992).

Official ad

== Final positions ==
Position	Country	Driver 1	Driver 2
1	Netherlands	Martin Koene	Jos Verstappen
2	Portugal	Manuel Gião	Pedro Couceiro
3	Italy	Oliver Martini	Patrick Crinelli
4	Brazil	Gualter Salles	Bruno Aguiar
5	Denmark	Henrik Larsen	Ina Neumann
6	Belgium	Wim Eyckmans	Jean-François Hemroulle
7	Germany	Helmut Schwitalla	Andre Fibier
8	Mexico	Freddy Van Beuren	Rafael Rábago
9	Austria	Ernst Franzmaier	Alexander Wurz
10	Sweden	Magnus Wallinder	Mattias Andersson
11	Ireland	Vivion Daly	David Wright
12	Estonia	Urmas Pold	Rain Pilve
13	Norway	Torbin Kvia	Lars Svelander
14	Switzerland	Johnny Hauser	Christian Fischer
