= EFDA Nations Cup =

Defunct Formula Opel competition

- Sport: Auto racing
- Founded: 1990
- Folded: 1998

The EFDA Nations Cup was a Formula Opel competition which was held between 1990 and 1998. The competition pitted international drivers against each other in similar cars, with drivers representing their nations. It was founded by Dan Partel within the Formula Opel/Vauxhall racing series.

The first Nations Cup race was held at the historic Spa-Francorchamps circuit in Belgium on 19–20 July 1990, and organised by the European Formula Drivers Association (EFDA).

== History ==
In 1990, drivers representing 25 countries were already participating in the various Formula Vauxhall/Opel Lotus Series. The Nations Cup format called for two-car national teams. The Formula Vauxhall/Opel Lotus racing series was the only series that could muster twenty legitimate two-car national teams from its active list of competitors.

The format of the event remained the same for the next eight years, with two drivers from each country racing in virtually identical Formula Opel/Vauxhall racing cars painted in their national colours.

The EFDA selected the Spa-Francorchamps circuit, licensed to start 46 cars or 23 two-car teams, for the inaugural event. The winners received the Nations Cup, and the top three teams were awarded gold, silver and bronze medals respectively. The event preceded the Spa 24 Hours race, and occurred in the middle of the racing season.

== Champions ==
Season	Venue	Teams	Drivers	Champion	Second	Third
1990	(Belgium) Circuit de Spa-Francorchamps	17	34	Portugal (Pedro Lamy, Diogo Castro Santos)	Brazil	Sweden
1991	(Netherlands) Circuit Park Zandvoort	18	36	Portugal (Pedro Lamy, Diogo Castro Santos)	Germany	Sweden
1992	(Portugal) Autódromo do Estoril	14	28	Netherlands (Martijn Koene, Jos Verstappen)	Portugal	Italy
1993	(Portugal) Autódromo do Estoril	15	30	Austria (Martin Albrecht, Hubert Stromberger)	Belgium	Brazil
1994	(Netherlands) Circuit Park Zandvoort	18	36	Netherlands (Tom Coronel, Donny Crevels)	Austria	Portugal
1995	(France) Circuit de Nevers Magny-Cours	15	30	Portugal (Manuel Gião, André Couto)	Netherlands	Great Britain
1996	(United Kingdom) Donington Park	13	26	Germany (Pierre Kaffer, Norman Simon)	United States	Brazil
1997	(United Kingdom) Donington Park	13	26	Italy (Giovanni Montanari, Giovanni Anapoli)	Brazil	Germany
1998	(Netherlands) Circuit Park Zandvoort	5	10	Great Britain (Darren Malkin, Justin Sherwood)	Netherlands	United States
