= 1996 EFDA Nations Cup =

Seasons
- ← 1995 1997 →

Layout of the Donington Park

The EFDA Nations Cup, was a Country vs Country competition for Formula Opel cars between 1990 and 1998. It had always been Dan Partel's dream to stage a race that pitted drivers in equal cars racing for their country. The Formula Opel/Vauxhall one make racing series offered the best opportunity for such an event.

The 1996 EFDA Nations Cup (Nations Cup VII), was held at Donington Park, England (2/3 November 1996).

== Final positions ==
Position	Country	Driver 1	Driver 2
1	Germany	Pierre Kaffer	Norman Simon
2	United States	Jerry Nadeau	Tony Renna
3	Brazil	Wagner Ebrahim	Ricardo Mauricio
4	Great Britain	Peter Duke	Adam Wilcox
5	Portugal	Frederico Viegas	Ricardo Teodósio
6	Netherlands	Sepp Koster	Sandor van Es
7	Ireland	Wayne Douglas	Derek Cunneely
8	Australia	Jason Bargwanna	Marcos Ambrose
9	Italy	Giovanni Montanari	Alessandro Marelli
10	Russia	Viktor Kozankov	Aleksey Vasilyev
11	Sweden	Tobias Andersson	Mikael Karlsson
12	United Nations	Madis Kasemets	Marco Nevalainen
13	European Union	Henry Stanton	Warren Carway
