= 1998 EFDA Nations Cup =

Seasons
- ← 1997 none →

Layout of the Circuit Park Zandvoort (1990–1998)

The EFDA Nations Cup, was a Country vs Country competition for Formula Opel cars between 1990 and 1998. It had always been Dan Partel's dream to stage a race that pitted drivers in equal cars racing for their country. The Formula Opel/Vauxhall one make racing series offered the best opportunity for such an event.

The 1998 EFDA Nations Cup (Nations Cup IX), was held at Zandvoort, Holland (3 October 1998).

== Final positions ==
Position	Country	Driver 1	Driver 2
1	Great Britain	Darren Malkin	Justin Sherwood
2	Netherlands	Jeroen Bleekemolen	Jeroen Reijntjens
3	United States	Paul Edwards	Ryan Walker
4	Australia	Ian Agnew	Brendon Cook
5	United Nations	Sandor Van Es	Andreas Bostrom
