= André Couto =

Macanese racing driver

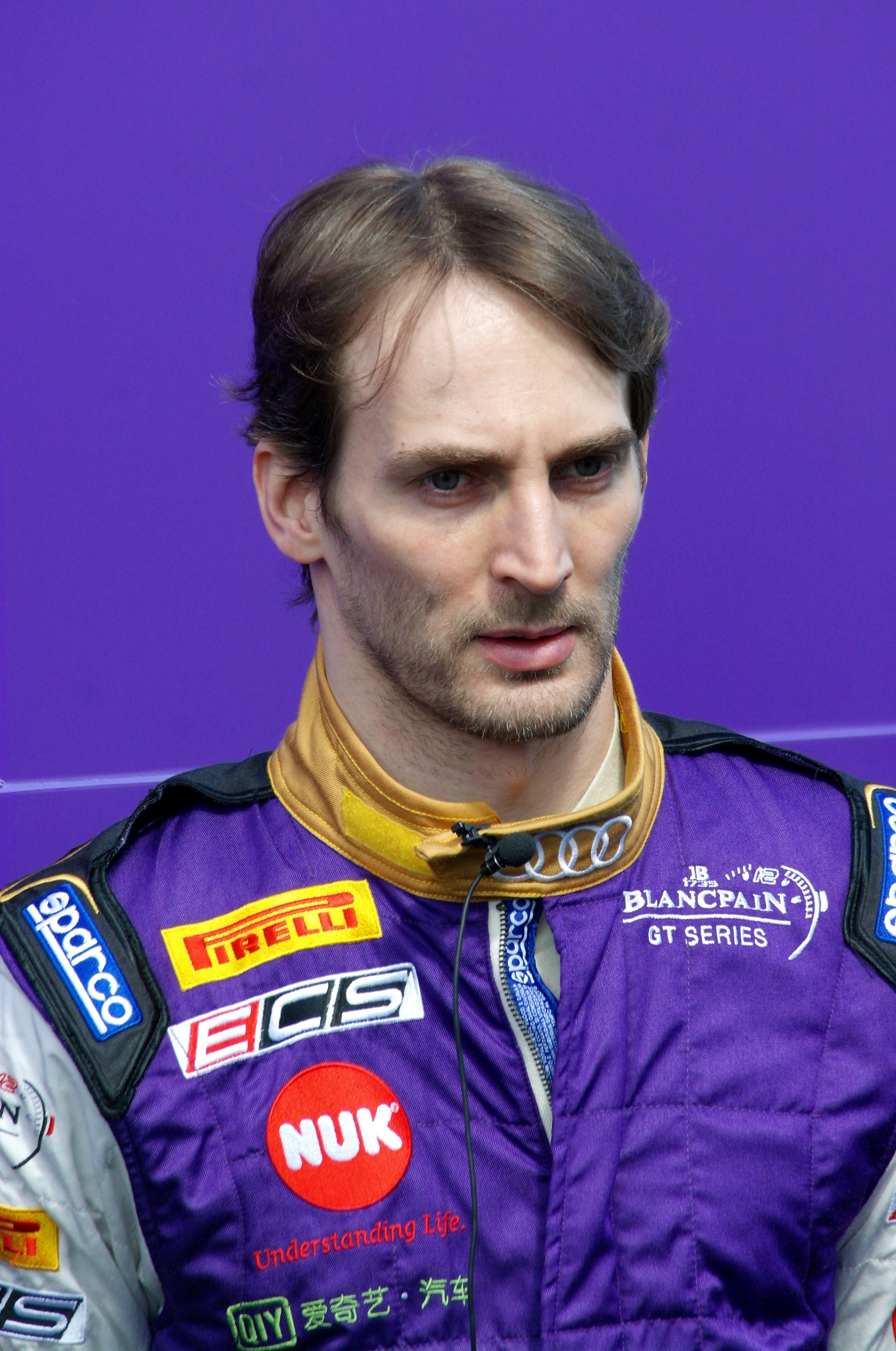
- Couto at the Silverstone round of the 2014 Blancpain Endurance Series season.
- Nationality: (Macau) Macanese
- Born: André Bragança Macedo e Couto; 14 December 1976 (age 49) Lisbon, Portugal

Super GT career
- Debut season: 2001
- Current team: JLOC
- Categorisation: FIA Gold (until 2017); FIA Silver (2018–)
- Car number: 87
- Former teams: SARD, Team Take One, Lexus Team WedsSport Bandoh, Pacific Racing Team, Gainer, D'station Racing
- Starts: 101
- Wins: 5
- Poles: 2
- Fastest laps: 3
- Best finish: 1st in 2015

Previous series
- 2005–12 2004 2003 2002 2001 2001 1998–2000 1996–97 1996 1995: WTCC; JGTC - GT500; ETCC; World Series by Nissan; JGTC - GT500; Formula Nippon; International F3000; Italian F3; German F3; Formula Opel Euroseries

Championship titles
- 2024 2024 2015 2005 2000 1995: LSTA - Pro-Am; Sepang 12 Hours - GT Cup; Super GT Series - GT300; 1000km of Suzuka; Macau F3 Grand Prix; EFDA Nations Cup

André Bragança Macedo e Couto (Chinese: 安德烈·高度; born 14 December 1976) is a Macanese motor racing driver who is best known for winning his home F3 Grand Prix in 2000 and the 2015 Super GT Series in the GT300 class.

== Career ==
=== Early years ===
Couto was born in Lisbon but moved to Macau with his family when he was four. He started his career in Karting in Macau influenced by the popular Macau Grand Prix and friends who competed in the local Karting championship. He rapidly enjoyed success and started competing and winning in international level. He moved to racing cars in 1995, where he competed in European Formula Opel Lotus (Winning a round in the Estoril Circuit). 1995 was also the debut year in the Formula Three event of the Macau Grand Prix, where he briefly led after a duel with race winner Ralf Schumacher.

=== Formula Three ===
Couto competed in German Formula Three in 1996 before moving to the Italian series in 1997, where he finished the season as runner-up in the championship.

==== 2000 Macau Grand Prix ====
Couto competed in the F3 Macau Grand Prix six times, eventually winning it in 2000, after India's Narain Karthikeyan, 24, and Japan's Takuma Sato, 23, crashed out of contention in leg one. Couto, driving for Opel Team BSR and starting second on the grid for the decider, took the lead immediately and fought off the intentions of Paolo Montin, 24, and Japan's Ryo Fukuda, 21. When Robert Lechner crashed with two laps to go, the safety car was called out and the drivers drove in formation behind it to the chequered flag. It marked the first time a Macanese driver has won the Formula 3 race title.

Couto's win was a surreal experience for many but for Couto's father, Carlos, it was the proudest moment of his life. "This was the one race André always wanted to win," he said. "He was born in Lisbon but we moved back to Macau when he was four. My wife Isabel and I have now lived in Macau for many years. Isabel was born here and all her family is from here. This will always be André’s home. He speaks fluent Cantonese like most Portuguese people living here. He is a Macau citizen; it is what he wanted. We've lived here happily for many years. Today is a special day for everyone in Macau."

=== Formula 3000 ===
Couto graduated to Formula 3000 in 1998 and stayed there for 1999 and 2000. Although he scored points on several occasions, he never achieved any great success. His best result was third place at the Nürburgring in 2000.

=== An assortment of drives ===
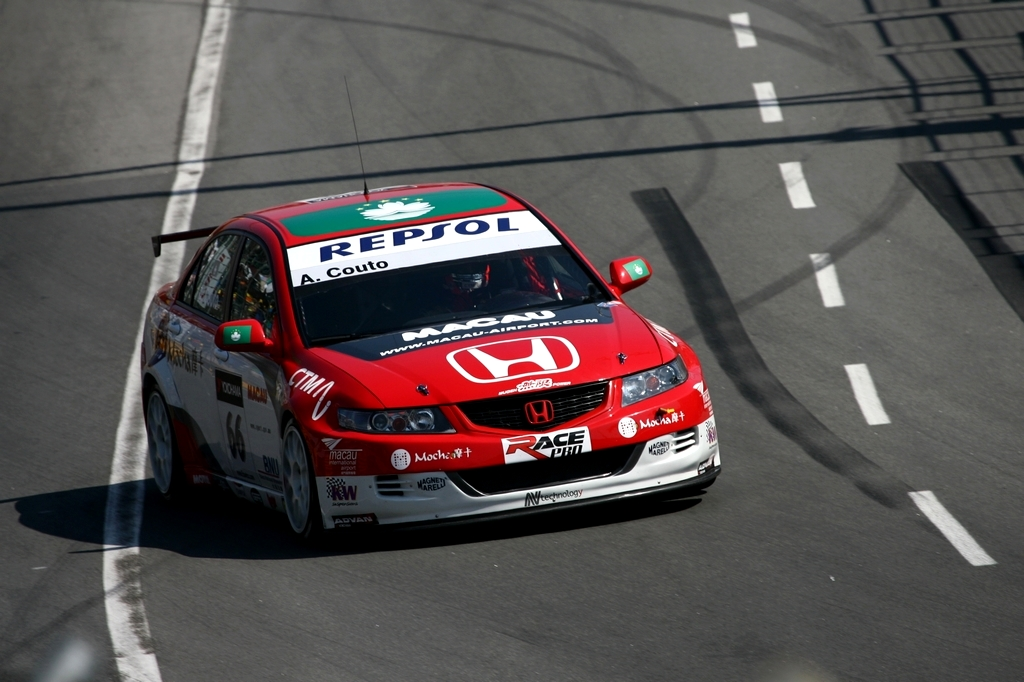
Couto driving the Honda Accord in the WTCC in Macau.

After leaving F3000 and winning the Macau Grand Prix Formula Three event in 2000, Couto competed in the Formula Nippon Championship in 2001 and competed in some races of the All-Japan GT Championship. For 2002 he moved to the World Series by Nissan, and finished seventh in the championship.

=== Touring car racing and sports car racing ===
Since 2003, Couto has competed frequently in the Guia Race of Macau as part of the European Touring Car Championship (ETCC) and later the World Touring Car Championship. He has competed at the race on different cars and teams: Alfa Romeo 156 and Honda Accord (for N.Technology), and SEAT León (for SEAT Sport and Sunred),

Since 2005, Couto has competed in the Super GT Championship in the GT500-class Lexus SC430, initially for SARD and in 2011 for Kraft. In November 2015, racing alongside his teammate Katsumasa Chiyo, André Couto was crowned the GT 300 champion with one round to go into the Super GT championship. He dedicated the victory to a “special one”, his late son Afonso, who succumbed to leukemia in 2010. Couto's GT300 title victory in 2015 made him the first foreign driver to win the GT300 drivers championship title and the only one to do so until João Paulo de Oliveira achieved a similar feat in 2020. Since Chiyo missed two rounds due to other obligations, Couto is also the first driver to win a Super GT driver's title on their own since both Ryo Michigami and Hideo Fukuyama in 2000.

On 8 July 2017, Couto was seriously hurt after crashing his Nissan GT-R GT3 in the China GT Championship race at Zhuhai International Circuit. He was taken to Sun Yat-sen University No.5 Hospital in Zhuhai for a CT scan that revealed a fracture to his L1 vertebra. He was then air lifted to Canossa Hospital in Hong Kong for an operation. Couto's father, Carlos, said that his son was not in a life-threatening situation.

== Personal life ==
Couto had a son, Afonso, who was diagnosed with leukaemia in November 2009. Several of his fellow WTCC drivers have carried stickers on their cars in the 2010 WTCC season to promote a website which is trying to find a suitable bone marrow donor. The GT Association and all teams of Super GT also launched a campaign towards bone marrow donation. A suitable bone marrow for Afonso was found on 9 May 2010 in Germany and his operation was successfully completed on 20 May 2010. Afonso died on 3 November 2010 from leukaemia treatment complications. He had been in the hospital for two weeks.

== Racing record ==
=== Complete International Formula 3000 results ===
(key) (Races in bold indicate pole position; races in italics indicate fastest lap.)

Year	Entrant	Chassis	Engine	1	2	3	4	5	6	7	8	9	10	11	12	Pos.	Pts
1998	Prema Powerteam	Lola T96/50	Zytek-Judd	OSC; Ret	IMO; 5	CAT; 14	SIL; Ret	MON; Ret	PAU; 6	A1R; Ret	HOC; Ret	HUN; 5	SPA; 14	PER; 9	NÜR; 5	11th	7
1999	Gauloises Junior	Lola T99/50	Zytek	IMO; Ret	MON; Ret	CAT; 3	MAG; Ret	SIL; DNQ	A1R; 7	HOC; Ret	HUN; Ret	SPA; 7	NÜR; DNS			13th	4
2000	Gauloises Formula	Lola T99/50	Zytek	IMO; Ret	SIL; 14	CAT; 10	NÜR; 3	MON; Ret	MAG; 21	A1R; Ret	HOC; 17	HUN; Ret	SPA; 11			18th	4

=== Complete Formula Nippon results ===
(key)

Year	Entrant	Chassis	Engine	1	2	3	4	5	6	7	8	9	10	DC	Pts
2001	Team Morinaga NOVA	G-Force GF03C	Mugen	SUZ; Ret	MOT; Ret	MIN; Ret	FUJ; 12							11th	5
2001	Team Morinaga NOVA	Reynard 99L	Mugen					SUZ; Ret	SUG; Ret	FUJ; 5	MIN; Ret	MOT; 4	SUZ; 14	11th	5

=== Complete JGTC/Super GT results ===
(key) (Races in bold indicate pole position) (Races in italics indicate fastest lap)

Year	Team	Car	Class	1	2	3	4	5	6	7	8	9	DC	Pts
2001	Team Take One	McLaren F1 GTR	GT500	TAI; 8	FUJ; Ret	SUG; 12	FUJ; 16	MOT; 6	SUZ; 10	**MIN**; 1			9th	38
2004	Toyota Team SARD	Toyota Supra	GT500	TAI; 3	SUG; Ret	SEP; 1	TOK; 7	MOT; 6	AUT; 2	SUZ; 8			**2nd**	**61**
2005	Toyota Team SARD	Toyota Supra	GT500	OKA; 8	FUJ; Ret	SEP; 9	SUG; 2	MOT; 14	FUJ; 12	AUT; 11	SUZ; 11		16th	21
2006	Toyota Team SARD	Toyota Supra	GT500	SUZ; 11	OKA; 13	FUJ; 11	SEP; 13	SUG; Ret	SUZ; 11	MOT; 9	AUT; 10	FUJ; 10	23rd	13
2007	Toyota Team SARD	Lexus SC430	GT500	SUZ; Ret	OKA; 12	FUJ; 8	SEP; 13	SUG; 6	SUZ; 11	MOT; 10	AUT; 3	FUJ; 13	15th	21
2008	Toyota Team SARD	Lexus SC430	GT500	SUZ; 12	OKA; 14	FUJ; 13	SEP; 12	SUG; 6	SUZ; 15	MOT; 13	AUT; 13	FUJ; 5	21st	11
2009	Lexus Team SARD	Lexus SC430	GT500	OKA; 15	SUZ; 10	FUJ; 10	SEP; 13	SUG; 2	SUZ; 7	FUJ; 11	AUT; 12	MOT; 5	14th	27
2010	Lexus Team SARD	Lexus SC430	GT500	SUZ; 5	OKA; 10	FUJ; Ret	SEP; 10	SUG; 10	SUZ; 8	FUJ; C	MOT		13th	12
2011	Lexus Team Kraft	Lexus SC430	GT500	OKA; 14	FUJ; 11	SEP; 10	SUG; Ret	SUZ; 7	FUJ; 9	AUT; 9	MOT; 14		15th	7
2012	Lexus Team WedsSport BANDOH	Lexus SC430	GT500	OKA; 12	FUJ; 13	SEP; 9	SUG; Ret	SUZ; 6	FUJ; 3	**AUT**; 3	MOT; 5		9th	36
2013	Lexus Team WedsSport BANDOH	Lexus SC430	GT500	OKA; 14	FUJ; 11	SEP; 15	SUG; 9	SUZ; 6	FUJ; Ret	AUT; 13	MOT; 10		14th	9
2014	Pacific Racing Team	Porsche 911 GT3	GT300	OKA	FUJ	AUT; 19	SUG; 17	FUJ; 15	SUZ; 7	BUR	MOT		30th	5
2015	Gainer	Nissan GTR	GT300	**OKA**; 7	FUJ; 1	CHA; 2	FUJ; 6	SUZ; 1	SUG; 6	AUT; 2	MOT; 6		1st	94
2016	Gainer	Nissan GT-R GT3	GT300	OKA; 8	FUJ; 5	SUG; 11	FUJ; 9	SUZ; 3	CHA; 4	MOT; 5	MOT; 15		8th	38
2017	D'station Racing	Porsche 911 GT3	GT300	OKA	FUJ	AUT; 7	SUG	FUJ	SUZ	CHA	MOT		22nd	4
2019	JLOC	Lamborghini Huracán GT3	GT300	OKA; 16	FUJ; 11	SUZ; 17	CHA; 7	FUJ; 1	AUT; Ret	SUG; 26	MOT; 23		8th	29

=== Complete European Touring Car Championship results ===
(key) (Races in bold indicate pole position) (Races in italics indicate fastest lap)

Year	Team	Car	1	2	3	4	5	6	7	8	9	10	11	12	13	14	15	16	17	18	19	20	DC	Pts
2003	PRO Motorsport	Honda Civic Type-R	VAL; 1 Ret	VAL; 2 DNS	MAG; 1; 15	MAG; 2 Ret	PER; 1 Ret	PER; 2 Ret	BRN; 1; 15	BRN; 2; 15	DON; 1; 12	DON; 2; 6	SPA; 1; 18†	SPA; 2; 15	AND; 1; 12	AND; 2; 14	OSC; 1; 16	OSC; 2; 15†	EST; 1; 20	EST; 2 Ret	MNZ; 1 Ret	MNZ; 2 DNS	18th	3

=== Complete World Touring Car Championship results ===
(key) (Races in bold indicate pole position) (Races in italics indicate fastest lap)

Year	Team	Car	1	2	3	4	5	6	7	8	9	10	11	12	13	14	15	16	17	18	19	20	21	22	23	24	DC	Points
2005	Alfa Romeo Racing Team	Alfa Romeo 156	ITA; 1	ITA; 2	FRA; 1	FRA; 2	GBR; 1	GBR; 2	SMR; 1	SMR; 2	MEX; 1	MEX; 2	BEL; 1	BEL; 2	GER; 1	GER; 2	TUR; 1	TUR; 2	ESP; 1	ESP; 2	MAC; 1 Ret	MAC; 2 DNS					NC	0
2006	SEAT Sport	SEAT León	ITA; 1	ITA; 2	FRA; 1	FRA; 2	GBR; 1	GBR; 2	GER; 1	GER; 2	BRA; 1	BRA; 2	MEX; 1	MEX; 2	CZE; 1	CZE; 2	TUR; 1	TUR; 2	ESP; 1	ESP; 2	MAC; 1; 13	MAC; 2; 7					23rd	2
2007	Alfa Romeo Racing Team	Alfa Romeo 156	BRA; 1	BRA; 2	NED; 1	NED; 2	ESP; 1	ESP; 2	FRA; 1	FRA; 2	CZE; 1	CZE; 2	POR; 1	POR; 2	SWE; 1	SWE; 2	GER; 1	GER; 2	GBR; 1	GBR; 2	ITA; 1	ITA; 2	MAC; 1 DNS	MAC; 2 DNS			NC	0
2008	N.Technology	Honda Accord Euro R	BRA; 1	BRA; 2	MEX; 1	MEX; 2	ESP; 1	ESP; 2	FRA; 1	FRA; 2	CZE; 1	CZE; 2	POR; 1	POR; 2	GBR; 1	GBR; 2	GER; 1	GER; 2	EUR; 1	EUR; 2	ITA; 1	ITA; 2	JPN; 1	JPN; 2	MAC; 1; 13	MAC; 2 Ret	NC	0
2009	SUNRED Engineering	SEAT León 2.0 TFSI	BRA; 1	BRA; 2	MEX; 1	MEX; 2	MAR; 1	MAR; 2	FRA; 1	FRA; 2	ESP; 1	ESP; 2	CZE; 1	CZE; 2	POR; 1	POR; 2	GBR; 1	GBR; 2	GER; 1	GER; 2	ITA; 1	ITA; 2	JPN; 1	JPN; 2	MAC; 1; 25	MAC; 2; 18	NC	0
2010	SR-Sport	SEAT León TDI	BRA; 1	BRA; 2	MAR; 1	MAR; 2	ITA; 1	ITA; 2	BEL; 1	BEL; 2	POR; 1	POR; 2	GBR; 1	GBR; 2	CZE; 1	CZE; 2	GER; 1	GER; 2	ESP; 1	ESP; 2	JPN; 1	JPN; 2	MAC; 1 Ret	MAC; 2 DNS			NC	0
2011	SUNRED Engineering	SUNRED SR León 1.6T	BRA; 1	BRA; 2	BEL; 1	BEL; 2	ITA; 1	ITA; 2	HUN; 1	HUN; 2	CZE; 1	CZE; 2	POR; 1	POR; 2	GBR; 1	GBR; 2	GER; 1	GER; 2	ESP; 1	ESP; 2	JPN; 1	JPN; 2	CHN; 1	CHN; 2	MAC; 1 Ret	MAC; 2 Ret	NC	0
2012	Tuenti Racing Team	SUNRED SR León 1.6T	ITA; 1	ITA; 2	ESP; 1	ESP; 2	MAR; 1	MAR; 2	SVK; 1	SVK; 2	HUN; 1	HUN; 2	AUT; 1	AUT; 2	POR; 1	POR; 2	BRA; 1	BRA; 2	USA; 1	USA; 2	JPN; 1	JPN; 2	CHN; 1	CHN; 2	MAC; 1; 15	MAC; 2; 11	NC	0

=== Complete World Touring Car Cup results ===
(key) (Races in bold indicate pole position) (Races in italics indicate fastest lap)

Year	Team	Car	1	2	3	4	5	6	7	8	9	10	11	12	13	14	15	16	17	18	19	20	21	22	23	24	25	26	27	28	29	30	DC	Points
2018	MacPro Racing Team	Honda Civic Type R TCR	MAR; 1	MAR; 2	MAR; 3	HUN; 1	HUN; 2	HUN; 3	GER; 1	GER; 2	GER; 3	NED; 1	NED; 2	NED; 3	POR; 1	POR; 2	POR; 3	SVK; 1	SVK; 2	SVK; 3	CHN; 1	CHN; 2	CHN; 3	WUH; 1	WUH; 2	WUH; 3	JPN; 1	JPN; 2	JPN; 3	MAC; 1; 21	MAC; 2; 20	MAC; 3; 18	43rd	0

=== Complete Sepang 12 Hour results ===
Year	Car#	Team	Co-Drivers	Car	Class	Laps	Pos.	Class Pos.
2024	710	(China) Madness Racing Team	(China) Han Shijie (China) Chen Fangping (China) He Xinyang	Lamborghini Super Trofeo EVO2	GT Cup	302	8th	**1st**

=== Complete GT World Challenge Asia results ===
(key) (Races in bold indicate pole position) (Races in italics indicate fastest lap)

Year	Team	Car	1	2	3	4	5	6	7	8	9	10	11	12	DC	Points
2024	Elegant Racing Team	Mercedes-AMG GT3 Evo	SEP; 1; 20	SEP; 2 Ret	BUR; 1	BUR; 2	FUJ; 1	FUJ; 2	SUZ; 1	SUZ; 2	OKA; 1	OKA; 2	SHA; 1	SHA; 2	NC	0

Sporting positions
Preceded by Darren Manning	Macau Grand Prix; Winner; 2000	Succeeded by Takuma Sato
Preceded by Nobuteru Taniguchi; Tatsuya Kataoka	Super GT; GT300 Champion; 2015	Succeeded by Takeshi Tsuchiya; Takamitsu Matsui
Preceded by Dan Wells; Oscar Lee	Lamborghini Super Trofeo Asia; Pro-Am Champion; 2024; With: Fangping Chen	Succeeded by Incumbent
