= Jos Verstappen =

Dutch racing driver (born 1972)

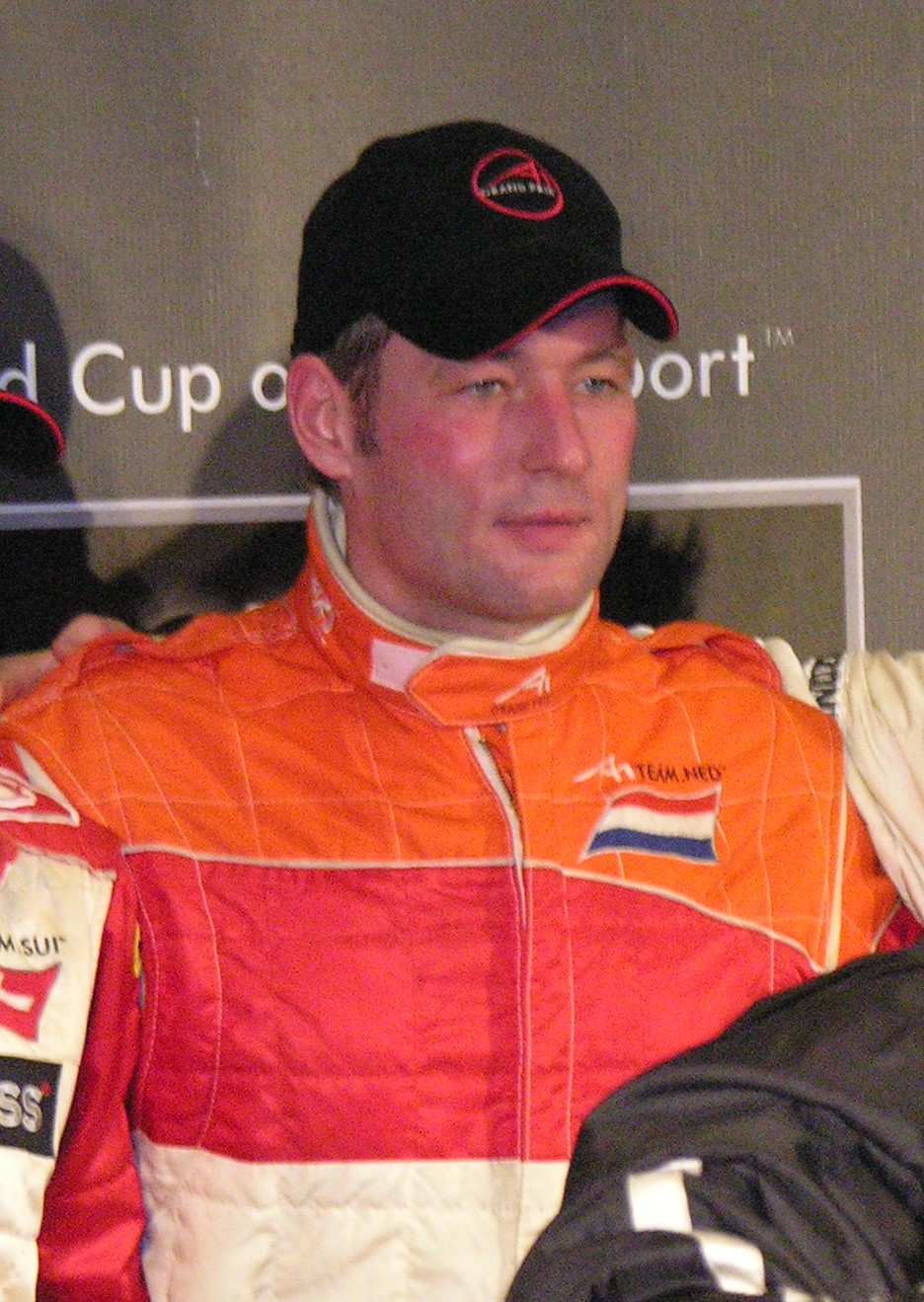
- Verstappen at the 2005–06 A1 Grand Prix of Nations, South Africa
- Born: Johannes Franciscus Verstappen; 4 March 1972 (age 54); Montfort, Limburg, Netherlands
- Spouses: Sophie Kumpen (m. 1996; div. 2008) Kelly van der Waal (m. 2014; div. 2017) Sandy Sijtsma (m. 2018)
- Children: 5, including Max

Formula One World Championship career
- Nationality: (Netherlands) Dutch
- Active years: 1994–1998, 2000–2001, 2003
- Team(s): Benetton, Simtek, Footwork, Tyrrell, Stewart, Arrows, Minardi
- Entries: 107 (106 starts)
- Championships: 0
- Wins: 0
- Podiums: 2
- Career points: 17
- Pole positions: 0
- Fastest laps: 0
- First entry: 1994 Brazilian Grand Prix
- Last entry: 2003 Japanese Grand Prix

24 Hours of Le Mans career
- Years: 2008–2009
- Teams: Van Merksteijn, Aston Martin
- Best finish: 10th (2008)
- Class wins: 1 (2008)

Johannes Franciscus "Jos" Verstappen (Dutch pronunciation: [ˈjɔs fɛrˈstɑpə(n)]; born 4 March 1972) is a Dutch racing and rally driver who competes in the European Rally Championship as a privateer. Verstappen competed in Formula One between 1994 and 2003. (Note: The exact years Verstappen competed in Formula One: 1994–1998, 2000–2001, 2003.)

Born and raised in Dutch Limburg, Verstappen began competitive kart racing aged eight. After a successful karting career—culminating in two senior European Championships in 1989—Verstappen graduated to junior formulae. He started his career in Formula Opel Lotus, winning the Benelux Championship in 1992. Later that year, he also won the EFDA Nations Cup, representing the Netherlands. Progressing to German Formula Three in 1993, Verstappen won the title in his rookie season with Opel, further winning the Masters of Formula 3.

Signing for Benetton as a test driver in 1994, Verstappen made his Formula One debut at the Brazilian Grand Prix, replacing the injured JJ Lehto to partner Michael Schumacher for the opening two rounds of the season. Verstappen formally replaced Lehto after the Canadian Grand Prix, scoring two podiums in his rookie season before being replaced by Johnny Herbert in Japan. His podium in Hungary made him the first Dutch driver to score a podium finish in Formula One. Verstappen competed for Simtek in 1995 before the team went bankrupt five rounds into the season, returning to his test driver role with Benetton. He became a full-time driver for Footwork in 1996. After non-classified championship finishes in 1997 and 1998 with Tyrrell and Stewart, respectively, Verstappen became a test driver for the Honda project in 1999. He returned to a race seat with Arrows in 2000, competing with them for a further two seasons. After a year hiatus, Verstappen completed his final Formula One season with Minardi in 2003.

Following his departure, Verstappen moved to A1 Grand Prix with the Netherlands for the 2005–06 season, achieving his sole victory in the South Africa feature race. He then competed in sportscar racing in 2008, winning both the 24 Hours of Le Mans and the Le Mans Series in the LMP2 class with Van Merksteijn. In rallying, he contested the 2022 Ypres Rally as an independent entrant, and has competed in the European Rally Championship since 2025. Since 2002, Verstappen has coached and managed his son Max from karting at an early age to winning four Formula One World Drivers' Championship titles. Max's success in the sport have renewed public scrutiny of Verstappen, who has faced several allegations of assault spanning two decades.

== Early career ==
Verstappen began karting at the age of eight, and was participating in national competitions not long after. In 1984, he became Dutch junior champion. Verstappen remained successful, becoming a two-class Karting European Champion in 1989, a feat that remained unmatched until his son Max in 2013.

At the end of 1991, Verstappen made the transition to car racing. He drove in Formula Opel Lotus, a class in which identical cars compete against each other. He won the European championship in his first year, and got an offer to drive in Formula Three with Van Amersfoort Racing, who also developed other drivers such as Christijan Albers, Tom Coronel and Bas Leinders. During that European winter season, he raced in New Zealand Formula Atlantic. Subsequently, in German Formula Three, he won several international competitions, including the 1993 Marlboro Masters and the German Formula 3 championship.

== Formula One ==
=== 1994: Benetton ===
Verstappen first drove a Formula One car when he tested for the Footwork Arrows team alongside Gil de Ferran and Christian Fittipaldi at the Estoril circuit in Portugal. The test took place on 28 September 1993, two days after the Portuguese Grand Prix was held at the same circuit. Despite the large increase in power (from a 175 bhp Formula Three car to the 750 bhp of Formula One), Verstappen set a time that would have qualified him in the preceding race on his fourth timed lap, and improved his time by more than a second after 65 laps. His best lap time of the day was 1:14.45, which was only 0.07 seconds slower than regular driver Derek Warwick had lapped during qualifying, and would have placed him tenth on the grid. He tested again on September 30 and was lapping near his existing record after five laps, but then crashed the car, ending the test early.

After the test, Verstappen was contacted by every Formula One team except Ferrari and Williams, and was eventually signed as the Benetton team's test driver for the 1994 season.

After a crash in pre-season testing by regular driver JJ Lehto (who broke a vertebra), Verstappen drove in the first two races of the season as a substitute, partnering Michael Schumacher and made his Formula One debut at the 1994 Brazilian Grand Prix. During the race, he collided with Eddie Irvine, which triggered a multiple accident also involving Éric Bernard and Martin Brundle. Verstappen's car somersaulted, but he emerged unharmed. At the Pacific Grand Prix Verstappen ran sixth but spun off on cold tyres immediately after a pit stop. Lehto was fit for the next race at Imola, but his performances in subsequent races were disappointing and he was rested by Benetton following the Canadian Grand Prix, allowing Verstappen to return to the race seat.

One of the most dramatic incidents affected Verstappen at the German Grand Prix. During his first scheduled pitstop during the race, fuel leaked onto the car after the fuel hose was disconnected. The car, with Verstappen in it, was engulfed in flames for several seconds. As was usual at the time, Verstappen had slightly opened the visor of his helmet for the pit stop, but apart from slight burns to his nose, he was uninjured. After this incident the fuel delivery hose was modified to incorporate a fail-safe cut-out system.

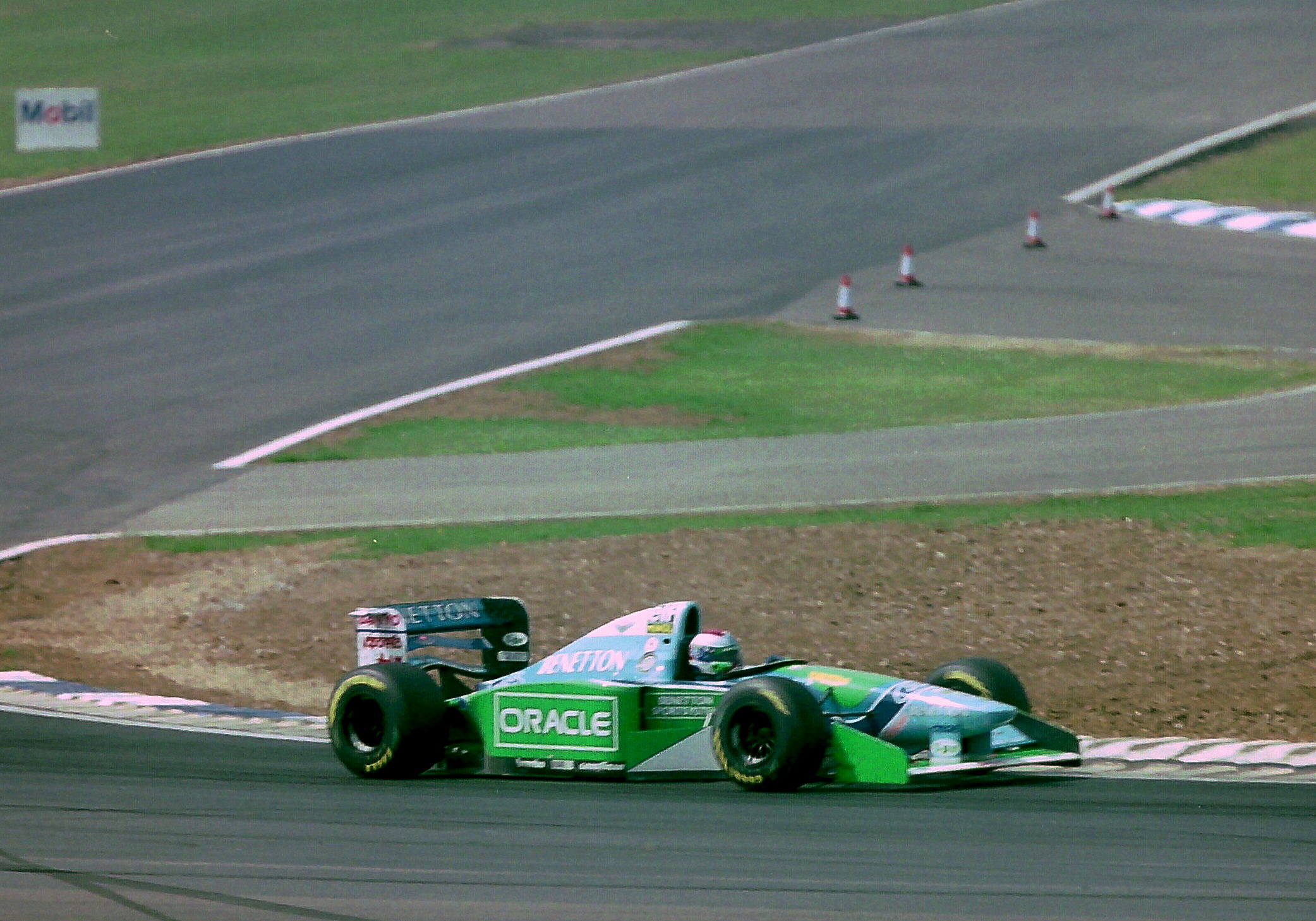
Verstappen driving the Benetton B194 at the 1994 British Grand Prix.

A high point in this season was Verstappen's third place during the next Grand Prix in Hungary, Schumacher having allowed Verstappen to unlap himself on the final lap to pass Martin Brundle's stricken McLaren-Peugeot. He took another third place at the Belgian Grand Prix due to Schumacher's post-race disqualification from victory, and a fifth place at the Portuguese Grand Prix. A curiosity was his accident during a practice session for the French Grand Prix at Magny-Cours, in which Verstappen rammed his car into the pit wall causing debris to fly up and destroy a TV installation. Due to this accident, this equipment is now protected from the race track by acrylic glass.

For the last two races of the season, Verstappen was replaced by the more experienced Johnny Herbert in a bid to win the Constructors' Championship for Benetton. Although the team was unsuccessful in this aim, losing out to the rival Williams team, Herbert was signed for the 1995 season instead of Verstappen.

=== 1995: Simtek ===
In 1995, Verstappen was loaned to Simtek by Benetton team principal Flavio Briatore. Despite some strong showings (including running 6th at the Argentine Grand Prix before a poor pit stop and subsequent gearbox failure) Verstappen only finished once in the five races he drove for the team due to technical difficulties. The team had deep financial troubles and went bankrupt after the Monaco Grand Prix. Out of a race drive, Verstappen did some test driving with Benetton and Ligier (then part-owned by Briatore and Tom Walkinshaw). Briatore decided against taking up his option for Verstappen in 1996, signing Jean Alesi and Gerhard Berger to drive instead.

=== 1996: Footwork Arrows ===
In 1996, Verstappen drove for the Footwork team. He ran fifth at Interlagos before retiring, and finished sixth in Buenos Aires. Shortly after, the team was taken over by Walkinshaw's TWR organisation. During the Belgian Grand Prix a part of the suspension of Verstappen's car broke off, causing him to crash heavily. He ended up with a prolonged neck injury. Initially Verstappen featured strongly in Walkinshaw's plans for 1997 (the new owner at one point threatening to replace him with a pay driver unless he signed for another season) but the surprise availability of Damon Hill (soon to be crowned World Champion) saw him dropped instead. His form in the second half of the season dropped off as development on the 1996 car ground to a standstill, TWR Arrows focusing instead on 1997.

=== 1997: Tyrrell ===
In 1997, Verstappen went to the Tyrrell team but did not score any points, though he briefly ran fifth in the Canadian Grand Prix. The team suffered from an underpowered Ford Cosworth EDV V8 engine and a lack of funding leaving Verstappen and teammate Mika Salo struggling towards the rear of the field. Verstappen's best result for the team was eighth at the wet Monaco Grand Prix. Before the 1998 season Tyrrell were sold to British American Tobacco, who intended to rebrand the team as British American Racing in 1999 after one final season under the Tyrrell banner. Ken Tyrrell wanted to retain Verstappen alongside Toranosuke Takagi but BAR insisted on taking pay driver Ricardo Rosset alongside the young Japanese driver. Tyrrell himself left the team in disgust over the matter, leaving Dr. Harvey Postlethwaite to run the team.

=== 1998: Stewart ===
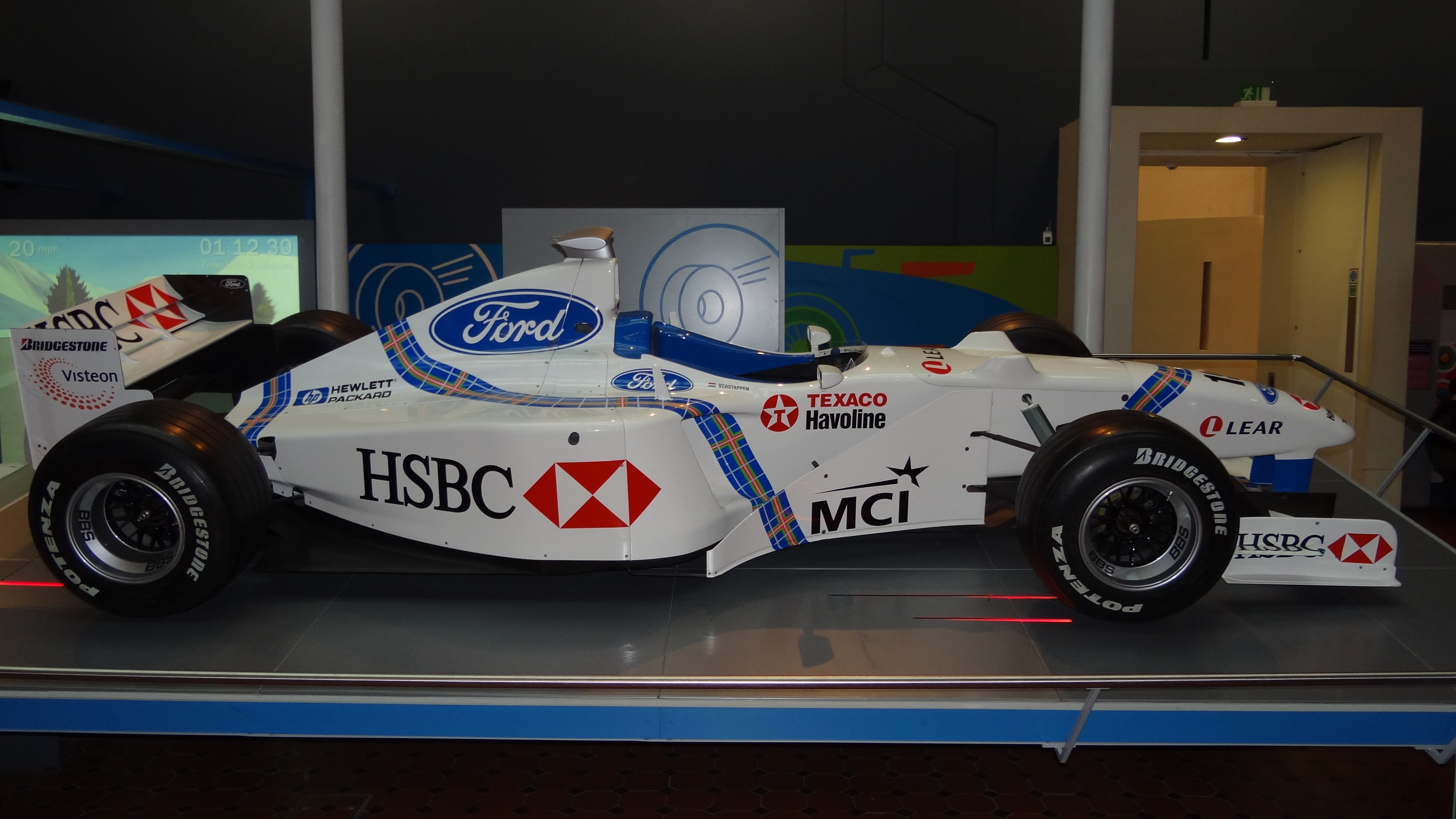
Verstappen's 1998 Stewart SF02, which he drove for the Stewart Grand Prix team

Out of a regular drive for 1998, Verstappen tested for Benetton once again early in the year, but the team would not hire him as a permanent test driver for lack of sponsors. As an experienced, fast free agent Verstappen was a common name mentioned in pit lane gossip as a replacement for underperforming drivers. He would eventually return to the series at the French Grand Prix, replacing Jan Magnussen at Stewart. However, the car was uncompetitive, the team struggled to run two cars to the same level and Verstappen did not perform significantly better than his predecessor. Johnny Herbert was signed to partner Rubens Barrichello for 1999 and Verstappen was left casting around for a drive again.

=== 1999: Honda ===
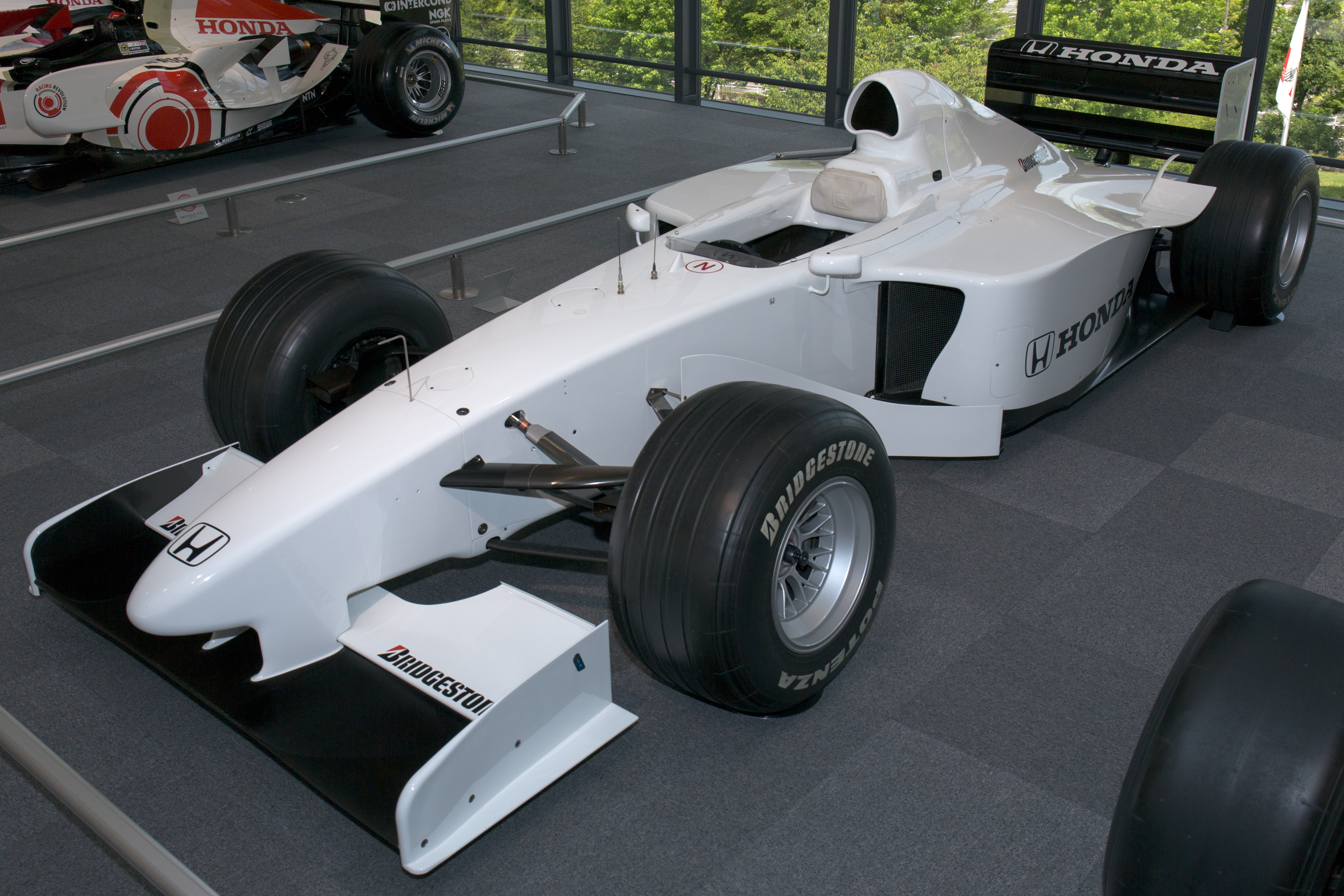
A Honda RA099 which Verstappen test drove.

Near the end of 1998, Verstappen became the test driver for the Honda Formula One project. He teamed up with old Tyrrell friends Rupert Manwaring and Harvey Postlethwaite, planning to test the new car in 1999 and join the series in 2000. All went well for the operation, with the testing hack showing well against upper-midfield teams such as Benetton and Williams in various test sessions until Postlethwaite died of a heart attack. Not long after, Honda changed their plans from becoming a team to a works engine supplier and Verstappen was again without a Formula One seat. He tested for the Jordan team in case Damon Hill decided to retire before the end of the season but this came to nothing when Verstappen's testing performance was underwhelming and Hill resolved to see out the season.

=== 2000–2001: Return to Arrows ===
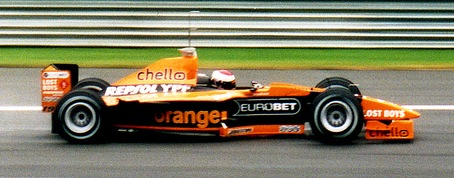
Verstappen testing for the Arrows team at the Monza circuit in 2000.

In 2000, Verstappen returned to Arrows, who had put together a package including Supertec engines, a chassis with good straight-line speed and a bevy of sponsors. The car proved to be unreliable, but its speed allowed Verstappen and teammate Pedro de la Rosa to dice with the front runners at several circuits. The design's small fuel tank meant the cars were often lighter than their rivals. In his second race back at Interlagos, he ran sixth before spinning due to a sore neck brought on by his lack of recent seat time. In the wet/dry Canadian Grand Prix, he drove superbly in the later stages to move into fifth position and score his first points since 1996. After the first corner accidents in Austria, de la Rosa and Verstappen ran fourth and fifth but mechanical problems sidelined them both. Verstappen would score only once again, a strong fourth place at Monza.

For 2001, Verstappen was retained by Arrows. The Supertec engines were replaced by Asiatech units and de la Rosa was dropped on the eve of the season for the Red Bull-backed Enrique Bernoldi. The package was more reliable and competitive on average beating Verstappen in qualifying on pace (often lining up behind his rookie teammate on the grid). Verstappen was hurt on occasion by indifferent qualifying form. Highlights of the season included running second at Sepang having started 18th, making a superb start and running well in changing conditions before dropping to seventh and later scoring the team's only point of the year for sixth at the A1-Ring. At Interlagos, he ran into the back of leader Juan Pablo Montoya just after being lapped while at Montreal, he moved into the top-six but retired with brake failure.

Verstappen re-signed to drive for Arrows in 2002, but was dropped at the eleventh hour in favour of Heinz-Harald Frentzen. Later that year, he almost signed a test contract with Sauber but he turned out to be physically too large for the car, which was smaller than its predecessor.

=== 2003: Minardi ===
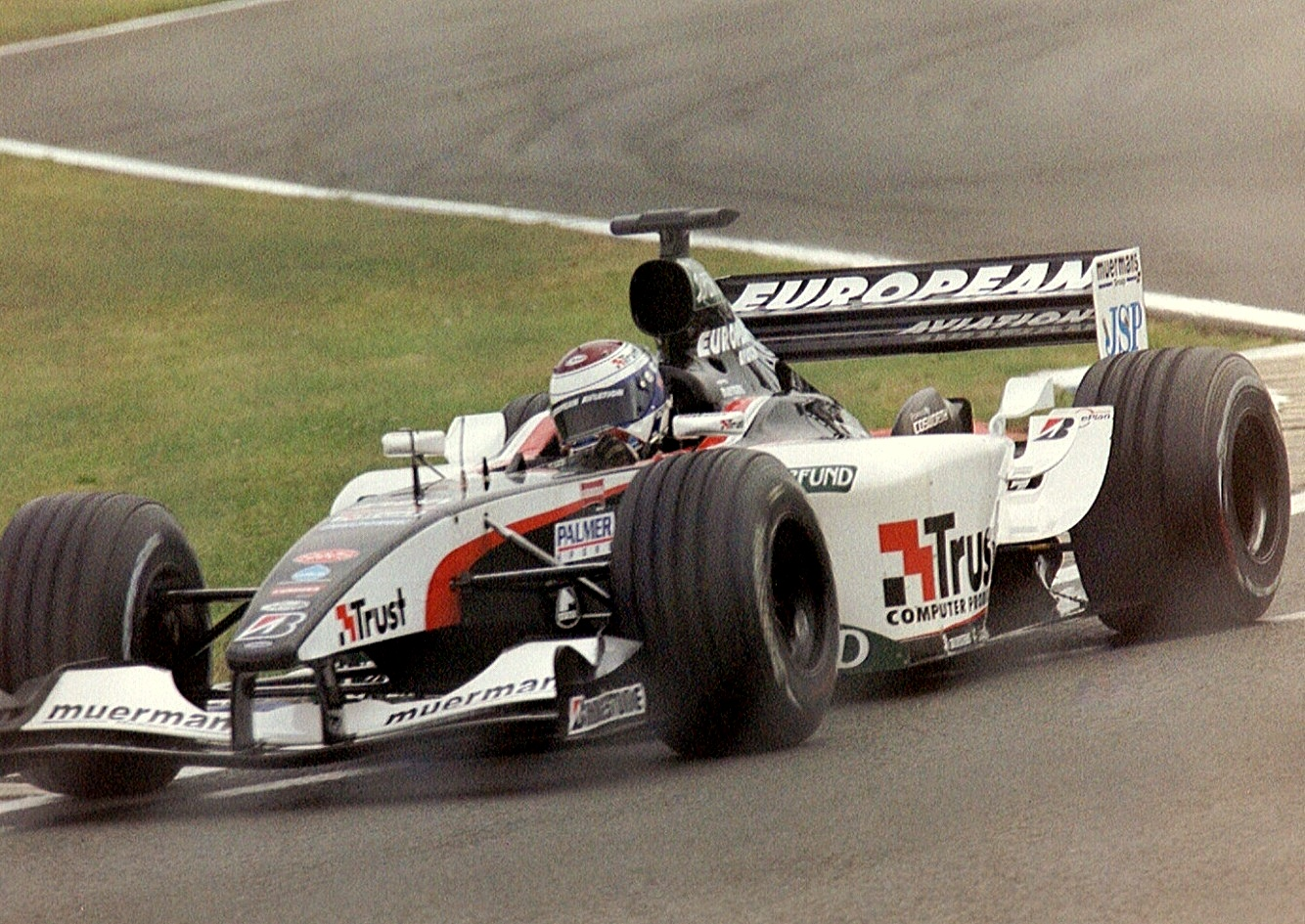
Verstappen driving for Minardi at the 2003 British Grand Prix

Verstappen returned to the cockpit in 2003 with Paul Stoddart's European Minardi team, considered the tail enders of the grid. With limited funds and underpowered engines it was a difficult season with little opportunity to shine. His best result was ninth at the Canadian Grand Prix, one place away from a point under the new scoring system. At the Brazilian Grand Prix, he had been running ahead of eventual winner Giancarlo Fisichella on the same strategy only to spin off on standing water, but generally the year was one to forget – and many noted that Verstappen was largely outperformed by rookie teammate Justin Wilson. At the French Grand Prix, Verstappen recorded his and Minardi's only provisional pole position in the first qualifying session by running last on a rapidly-drying track; in the second, dry qualifying session, Verstappen qualified on the team's usual back row. Saturday qualifying, due to wet weather At the end of the year, he left the Italian team because he did not feel like driving in the rear-guard for another year.

Out of a drive for 2004, Verstappen was considered as a replacement for Giorgio Pantano at Jordan partway through the season but was unable to fit in the car and began looking for drives outside Formula One for the following season.

Verstappen participated in 107 Grands Prix. He achieved two podium places, and scored a total of 17 championship points (117 in the modern system) which makes him the second best performing Dutch driver in Formula One to date, beaten only by his son, Max. His highest qualifying position was sixth, at the 1994 Belgian Grand Prix.

== A1 Grand Prix ==
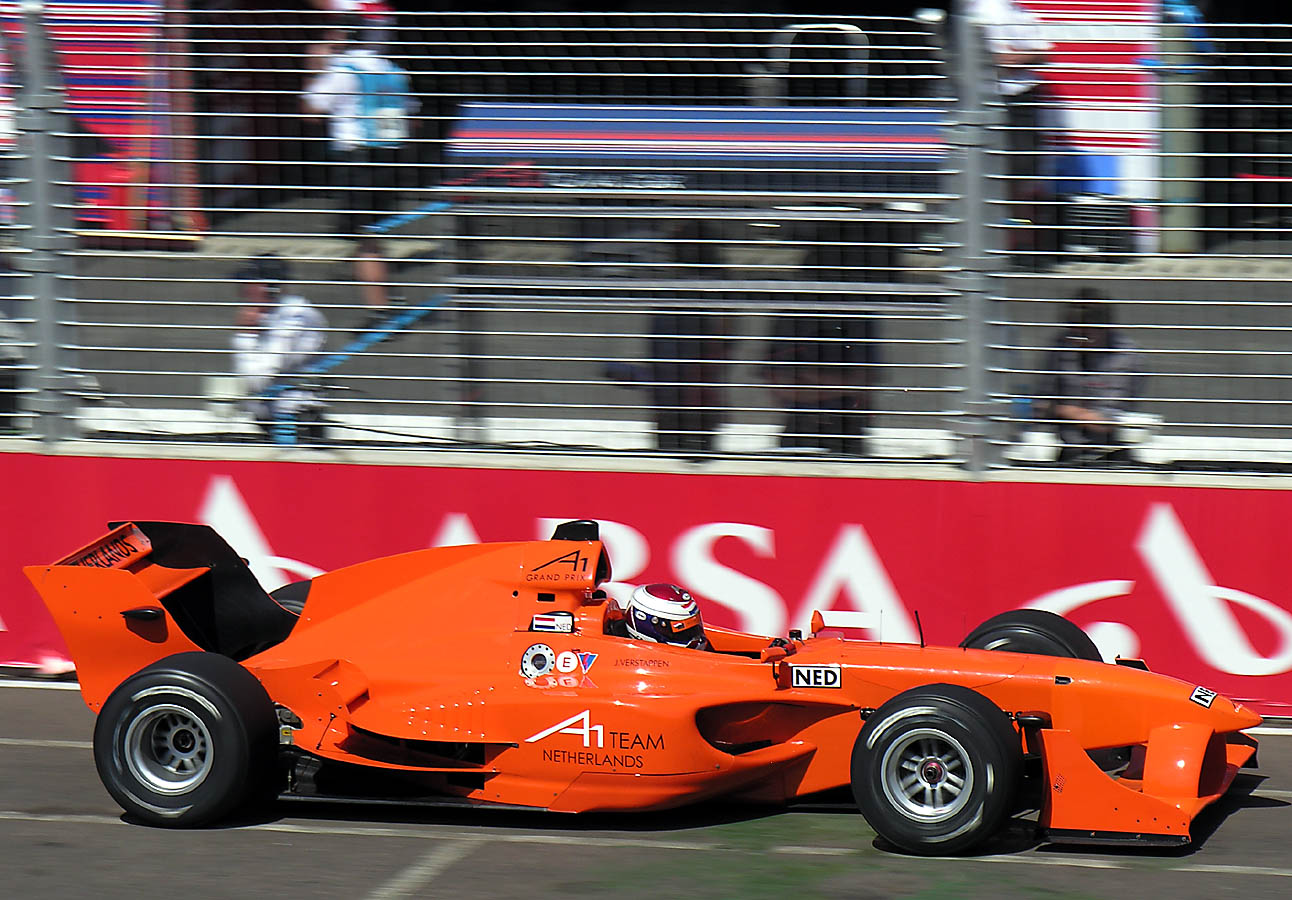
Verstappen driving for A1 Team Netherlands at the A1 Grand Prix in Durban, 2006

After two years of not participating in races, Verstappen was confirmed in July as driver of the A1 Team Netherlands managed by seatholder Jan Lammers's Racing for Holland, for the A1 Grand Prix series. They won the feature race at Durban.

On 27 September 2006, Verstappen split with A1 Team Netherlands after failing to secure payment guarantees. This resulted from Verstappen only being paid for the 2005/06 season a few weeks before the next season started. He was replaced by Jeroen Bleekemolen for the first race of the 2006/07 season at the team's home race at Zandvoort.

== Le Mans Series ==
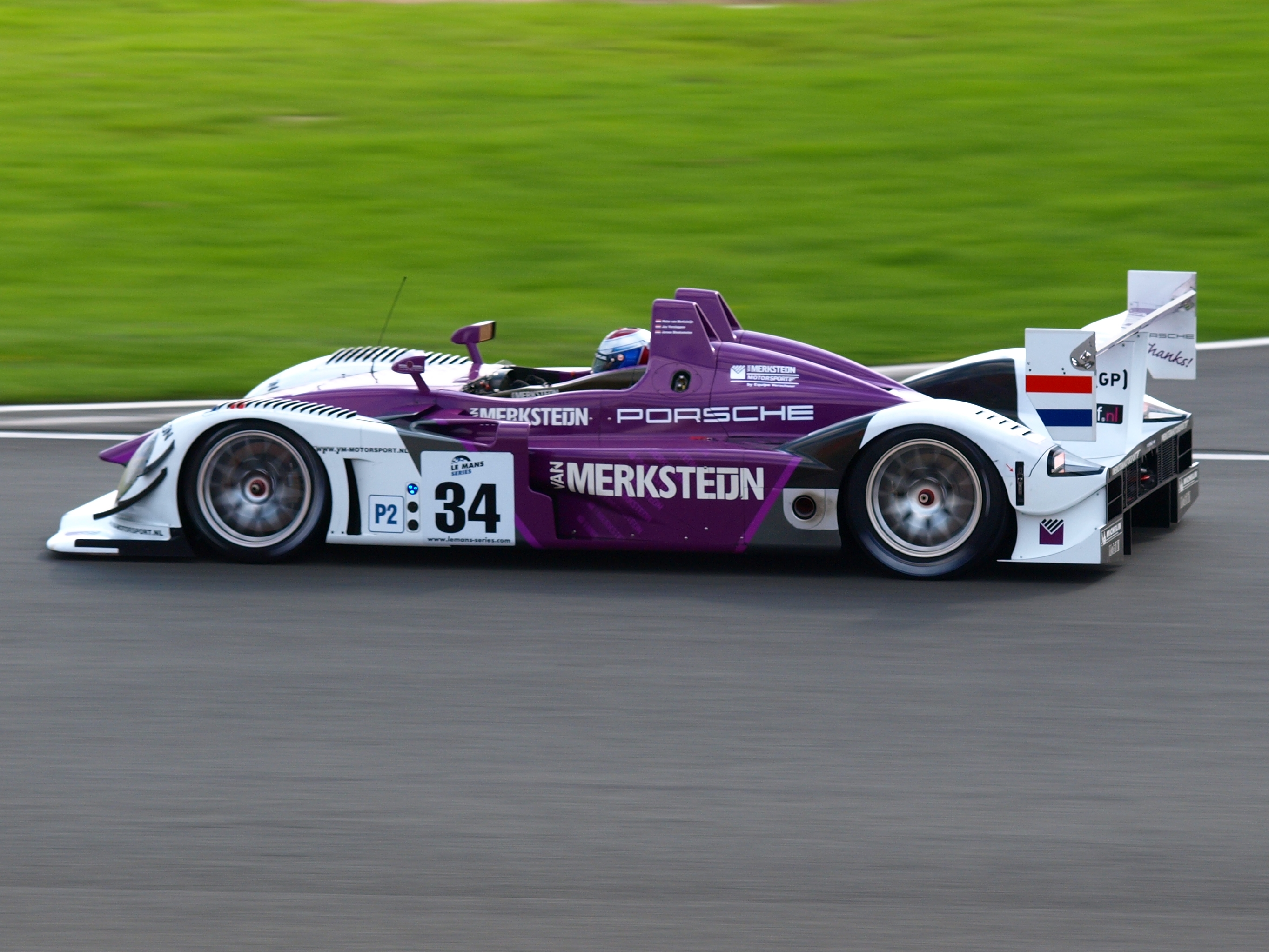
Verstappen driving for Van Merksteijn Motorsport at the 2008 1000km of Silverstone, in which he and teammate Peter van Merksteijn Sr. won the LMP2 class.

In December 2007, Verstappen announced that he would take part in the 2008 24 Hours of Le Mans race, as well as enter the 1,000 kilometre races in the Le Mans Series. Driving a LMP2-class Porsche RS Spyder fielded by Van Merksteijn Motorsport, Verstappen was partnered by team owner Peter van Merksteijn Sr. Jeroen Bleekemolen also joined the team for the 24 Hours of Le Mans race.

After winning the 1000km Catalunya and 1000km Spa, and finishing second in the 1000km Monza, Verstappen won the LMP2 class of the 2008 24 Hours of Le Mans. With his victory at the 1000km Nurburgring, Verstappen clinched the LMP2 Drivers' title and Van Merksteijn Motorsport won the LMP2 Manufacturers' title.

Verstappen participated in the 2009 24 Hours of Le Mans in a Lola-Aston Martin.

== Personal life ==
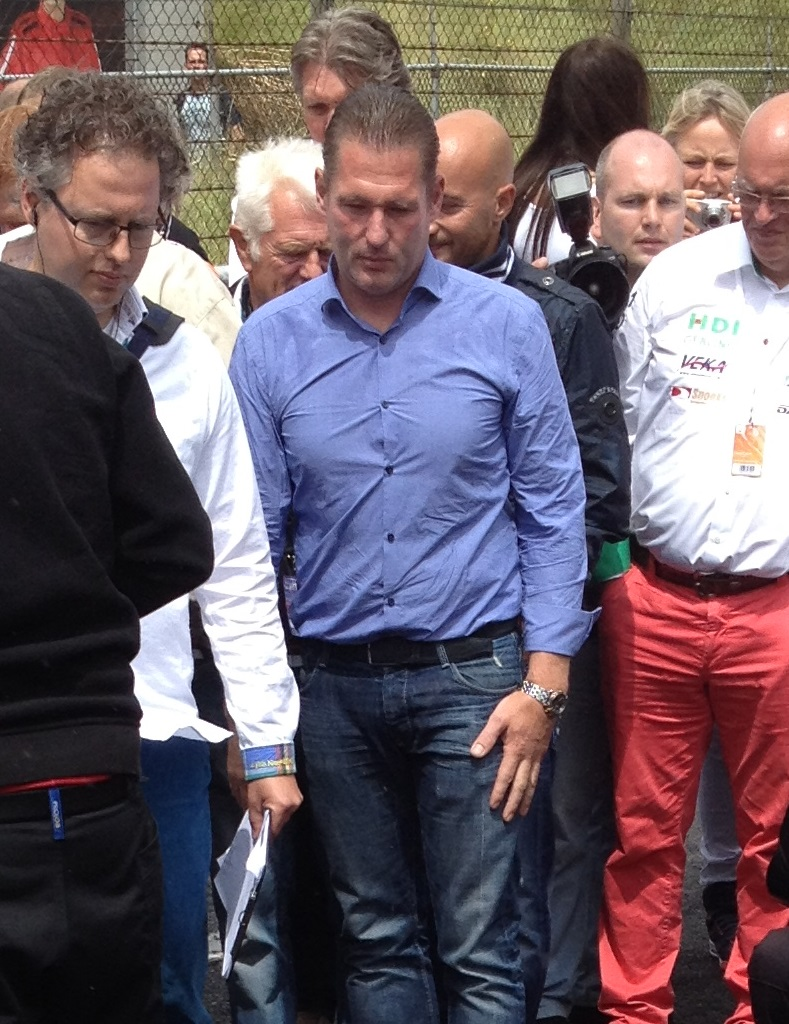
Verstappen in 2014

Verstappen speaks Dutch, English and German.

In 1996, Verstappen married Belgian ex-kart driver champion Sophie Kumpen, whose cousin is NASCAR Whelen Euro Series racing driver Anthony Kumpen, and whose uncle is former motocross, endurance, and rally driver Paul Kumpen. Verstappen and Sophie had two children, Max (b. 1997) and Victoria (b. 1999). He has a second daughter, Blue Jaye (b. 2014), with his second wife Kelly van der Waal. He also has a second son, Jason Jaxx (b. 2019) and third daughter Mila Faye (b. 2020), with his third and current wife Sandy Sijtsma. Both Max and Victoria have gone on to become racing drivers, with Max becoming a four-time Formula One World Drivers' Champion, in 2021, 2022, 2023, and 2024.

Starting in 2002, Verstappen coached and managed Max in kart racing at an early age. Jos' parenting of his son has been described by some in Formula One as either "tough love" or child abuse. Some of them allege Jos physically beat Max multiple times, once at a kart race to punish him for not performing better. Contrarily, Jos says he made his son's kart perform worse and told him false rules about races because Max was "winning so easily". Jos also says he made Max drive karts when Max was unable to, such as when it was freezing cold once: “he couldn’t move his fingers [to drive] and I didn’t care." [...] "When the fingers warm up again that’s very painful. I said, 'Ah, shut up.'" Max has stated that in 2012, during a kart race, Max crashed and damaged his kart while attempting to overtake; while Jos drove him home, Jos abandoned him at a fuel station and drove on for some time before returning to retrieve him. Once home, Jos did not speak to him for a week. Jos has denied that he abused Max, who, journalist Erik van Haren reports, publicly has a good relationship with his father.

When Max Verstappen was teammates with Daniel Ricciardo at Red Bull Racing, the team released a promo video of the two having a conversation. In it, Ricciardo playfully made a stabbing motion at a table, to which Max responded, "My dad did that once [to] a mechanic with a fork". The Sunday Times writes that Ricciardo's surprised reaction suggests Max was serious.

== Legal issues ==
After a 1998 incident at a karting track in which a man suffered a fractured skull, Verstappen and his father, Frans, were found guilty in court of assault but were each given a five-year suspended jail sentence after reaching an out-of-court settlement with the victim.

In December 2008, after Verstappen and Sophie Kumpen were effectively separated, he appeared in court in Tongeren, Belgium, charged with assaulting her. He was found not guilty of assault, but guilty of threatening her in text messages and of violating a previously issued restraining order. He was fined and sentenced to three months probational, suspended prison sentence. In January 2009, Verstappen again had to appear in court and was convicted to a three months suspended prison sentence and a 1650 Euro fine for sending Kumpen threats and visiting her house despite the restraining order.

On 29 November 2011, the media reported allegations that Verstappen had assaulted an unnamed 24 year old girlfriend in a hotel room in the Dutch city of Venlo; Verstappen claimed to only have had a discussion with her. In January 2012, he was arrested on attempted murder charges following accusations that he drove a car into his ex-girlfriend in Roermond - who was taken by ambulance to hospital with heavy bruises and abrasions. Verstappen was previously accused of beating his girlfriend. "It's definitely not the first time he does this," the unnamed woman told RTL television. "I think now I need to go and hide -- I don't know what to expect now when he is released." but released two weeks later after the charge was withdrawn. Verstappen was also accused of destroying two cell phones, jewellery and the handbag of his girlfriend, and he faced two weeks of imprisonment and 20 hours of community work service. Verstappen's lawyer Geert Jan Knoops said his client was relieved and he hopes this will be the definitive end of the court case. According to Dutch sources, Verstappen and his girlfriend are back together again. He and his ex-girlfriend, Kelly van der Waal, got back together and were married in 2014. They have one daughter, Blue Jaye, born in September 2014. They divorced on 2 June 2017.

On 28 July 2016, it was reported that Verstappen physically attacked his own father, Dutchman Frans Verstappen in his hometown of Montford. According to the official report, it occurred shortly after the 2016 Hungarian Grand Prix. De Telegraaf, a large Dutch media group, stated that Frans Verstappen filed a complaint with the police. "We've seen before that Jos has loose hands but this was the limit," Frans, showing multiple wounds and bruises on his body and head, is quoted as saying. "Jos is very bad tempered." Manager Raymond Vermeulen said the incident was a "private matter". Later, Limburg broadcaster L1 reported that Frans had withdrawn the complaint, with him stating, "It's just a private matter between myself and Jos. I want to keep it between ourselves."

== Racing record ==
=== Racing career summary ===
Season	Series	Team	Races	Wins	Poles	F/Laps	Podiums	Points	Position
1992	Formula Opel Lotus Benelux		9	8	?	?	?	160	**1st**
1992	Formula Opel Lotus Euroseries	Van Amersfoort Racing	7	2	2	2	2	59	7th
1992	EFDA Nations Cup	Team Netherlands	1	1	?	?	1	N/A	**1st**
1992	Formula Opel Lotus Netherlands		1	0	0	?	1	N/A	NC
1993	German Formula Three	Opel Team WTS	20	8	6	9	14	269	**1st**
1993	Formula Pacific		10	3	?	?	6	185	4th
1993	Masters of Formula 3	Opel Team WTS	1	1	1	0	1	N/A	**1st**
1994	Formula One	Mild Seven Benetton Ford	10	0	0	0	2	10	10th
1994	Formula One	Mild Seven Benetton Ford	Test driver						
1995	Formula One	MTV Simtek Ford	4	0	0	0	0	0	NC
1995	Formula One	Mild Seven Benetton Renault	Test driver						
1996	Formula One	Footwork Hart	16	0	0	0	0	1	16th
1997	Formula One	PIAA Tyrrell Ford	17	0	0	0	0	0	NC
1998	Formula One	HSBC Stewart Ford	9	0	0	0	0	0	NC
1999	Formula One	Honda	Test driver†						
2000	Formula One	Arrows F1 Team	17	0	0	0	0	5	12th
2001	Formula One	Orange Arrows Asiatech	17	0	0	0	0	1	18th
2003	Formula One	European Minardi Cosworth	17	0	0	0	0	0	22nd
2003	Formula One	Trust Minardi Cosworth	17	0	0	0	0	0	22nd
2005–06	A1 Grand Prix	A1 Team Netherlands	22	1	0	2	2	69	7th
2008	Le Mans Series – LMP2	Van Merksteijn Motorsport	5	4	5	1	5	48	**1st**
2008	24 Hours of Le Mans – LMP2	Van Merksteijn Motorsport	1	1	0	0	1	N/A	**1st**
2009	24 Hours of Le Mans – LMP1	Aston Martin Racing	1	0	0	0	0	N/A	11th
2012	City Challenge Baku GT	V4O	1	0	0	0	0	0	7th
2025	European Rally Championship								

^{†} Verstappen was the test driver for the aborted Honda F1 project.

=== Complete German Formula Three results ===
(key) (Races in bold indicate pole position) (Races in italics indicate fastest lap)

Year	Entrant	Engine	1	2	3	4	5	6	7	8	9	10	11	12	13	14	15	16	17	18	19	20	DC	Pts
1993	Opel Team WTS	Opel	ZOL; 1; 3	ZOL; 2 Ret	HOC; 1; 5	HOC; 2; 4	NÜR; 1; 2	NÜR; 2; 2	WUN; 1; 1	**WUN**; **2**; 1	**NOR**; **1**; 1	**NOR**; **2**; 1	DIE; 1; 2	DIE; 2 Ret	**NÜR**; **1**; 2	NÜR; 2; 1	SIN; 1; 2	SIN; 2; 1	**AVU**; **1**; 1	**AVU**; **2**; 1	HOC; 1; 7	HOC; 2; 11	**1st**	**269**

=== Complete Formula One results ===
(key) (Races in bold indicate pole position) (Races in italics indicate fastest lap)

Year	Entrant	Chassis	Engine	1	2	3	4	5	6	7	8	9	10	11	12	13	14	15	16	17	WDC	Points
1994	Mild Seven Benetton Ford	Benetton B194	Ford V8	BRA; Ret	PAC; Ret	SMR	MON	ESP	CAN	FRA; Ret	GBR; 8	GER; Ret	HUN; 3	BEL; 3	ITA; Ret	POR; 5	EUR; Ret	JPN	AUS		10th	10
1995	MTV Simtek Ford	Simtek S951	Ford V8	BRA; Ret	ARG; Ret	SMR; Ret	ESP; 12	MON; DNS	CAN	FRA	GBR	GER	HUN	BEL	ITA	POR	EUR	PAC	JPN	AUS	NC	0
1996	Footwork Hart	Footwork FA17	Hart V8	AUS; Ret	BRA; Ret	ARG; 6	EUR; Ret	SMR; Ret	MON; Ret	ESP; Ret	CAN; Ret	FRA; Ret	GBR; 10	GER; Ret	HUN; Ret	BEL; Ret	ITA; 8	POR; Ret	JPN; 11		16th	1
1997	PIAA Tyrrell Ford	Tyrrell 025	Ford V8	AUS; Ret	BRA; 15	ARG; Ret	SMR; 10	MON; 8	ESP; 11	CAN; Ret	FRA; Ret	GBR; Ret	GER; 10	HUN; Ret	BEL; Ret	ITA; Ret	AUT; 12	LUX; Ret	JPN; 13	EUR; 16	NC	0
1998	HSBC Stewart Ford	Stewart SF02	Ford V10	AUS	BRA	ARG	SMR	ESP	MON	CAN	FRA; 12	GBR; Ret	AUT; Ret	GER; Ret	HUN; 13	BEL; Ret	ITA; Ret	LUX; 13	JPN; Ret		NC	0
2000	Arrows F1 Team	Arrows A21	Supertec V10	AUS; Ret	BRA; 7	SMR; 14	GBR; Ret	ESP; Ret	EUR; Ret	MON; Ret	CAN; 5	FRA; Ret	AUT; Ret	GER; Ret	HUN; 13	BEL; 15	ITA; 4	USA; Ret	JPN; Ret	MAL; 10	12th	5
2001	Orange Arrows Asiatech	Arrows A22	Asiatech V10	AUS; 10	MAL; 7	BRA; Ret	SMR; Ret	ESP; 12	AUT; 6	MON; 8	CAN; 10^{†}	EUR; Ret	FRA; 13	GBR; 10	GER; 9	HUN; 12	BEL; 10	ITA; Ret	USA; Ret	JPN; 15	18th	1
2003	European Minardi Cosworth	Minardi PS03	Cosworth V10	AUS; 11	MAL; 13	BRA; Ret	SMR; Ret	ESP; 12	AUT; Ret												22nd	0
2003	Trust Minardi Cosworth	Minardi PS03	Cosworth V10							MON; Ret	CAN; 9	EUR; 14	FRA; 16	GBR; 15	GER; Ret	HUN; 12	ITA; Ret	USA; 10	JPN; 15		22nd	0

^{†} Did not finish, but was classified as he had completed more than 90% of the race distance.

=== Complete A1 Grand Prix results ===
(Races in bold indicate pole position) (Races in italics indicate fastest lap)

Year	Team	1	2	3	4	5	6	7	8	9	10	11	12	13	14	15	16	17	18	19	20	21	22	DC	Points	Ref
2005–06	Netherlands	GBR; SPR; Ret	GBR; FEA; 7	GER; SPR; Ret	GER; FEA; 7	POR; SPR; 4	POR; FEA; Ret	AUS; SPR; 7	AUS; FEA; 4	MYS; SPR; 5	MYS; FEA; 16	UAE; SPR; 11	UAE; FEA; 9	RSA; SPR; 16	RSA; FEA; 1	IDN; SPR; 7	IDN; FEA; 6	MEX; SPR; 4	MEX; FEA; 2	USA; SPR; 14	USA; FEA; Ret	CHN; SPR; Ret	CHN; FEA; 17	7th	69	

=== Complete Le Mans Series results ===
(key) (Races in bold indicate pole position; races in italics indicate fastest lap)

Year	Entrant	Class	Chassis	Engine	1	2	3	4	5	Pos.	Points
2008	Van Merksteijn Motorsport	LMP2	Porsche RS Spyder Evo	Porsche MR6 3.4 L V8	**CAT**; 1	**MNZ**; 2	**SPA**; 1	**NÜR**; 1	**SIL**; 1	1st	48

=== 24 Hours of Le Mans results ===
Year	Team	Co-Drivers	Car	Class	Laps	Pos.	Class Pos.
2008	(Netherlands) Van Merksteijn Motorsport	(Netherlands) Peter van Merksteijn Sr. (Netherlands) Jeroen Bleekemolen	Porsche RS Spyder Evo	LMP2	354	10th	**1st**
2009	(United Kingdom) Aston Martin Racing	(United Kingdom) Anthony Davidson (United Kingdom) Darren Turner	Lola-Aston Martin B09/60	LMP1	342	13th	11th

== See also ==
- Formula One drivers from the Netherlands

== Notes ==
Sporting positions
Preceded by Pedro Lamy	Masters of Formula 3 Winner; 1993	Succeeded by Gareth Rees
Preceded by Pedro Lamy	German Formula Three champion 1993	Succeeded by Jörg Müller
Preceded by Thomas Erdos; Mike Newton	Le Mans Series; LMP2 Champion; 2008	Succeeded by Miguel Amaral; Olivier Pla
