= Oliver Martini =

Italian racing driver

- Nationality: Italian
- Born: 12 December 1971 (age 54) Bologna (Italy)
- Relatives: Pierluigi Martini (brother); Giancarlo Martini (uncle)

Oliver Martini (born 12 December 1971, in Bologna) is an Italian racing driver. He has competed in such series as International Formula 3000, Euroseries 3000 and the EFDA Nations Cup. He won the Italian Formula Three Championship in 1997 for RC Motorsport.

Martini's older brother, Pierluigi, was also a racing driver who competed in Formula One between 1984 and 1995 and won the 1999 24 Hours of Le Mans. Their uncle, Giancarlo, was also a racing driver.

Sporting positions
Preceded by Andrea Boldrini	Italian Formula Three Champion; 1997	Succeeded by Donny Crevels
