= Niko Palhares =

Brazilian former racing driver (born 1966)

Antônio Rios Palhares a.k.a. Niko Palhares (born February 24, 1966) is a Brazilian former racing driver who gained notoriety in 2024 for being fired from his government job after spreading anti-democratic messages against the government in the "digital militias" scandal.

== Background ==
=== Racing career ===
Palhares began in Formula Ford and won the Formula Ford Festival in 1989. He moved to the British Formula Three Championship in 1990 competing in six races but not scoring. He moved to Italian F3 the next year and finished 11th in points. He was second in Italian F3 in 1992 with two race wins. In 1993 he competed in four Japanese F3 races and finished 12th in points. After taking 1994 off from high-level racing, he competed in the American Indy Lights series in 1995 for PacWest Racing for the first four races of the season with a best finish of eighth at Phoenix International Raceway and finishing 20th in points. That was the end of his professional racing career.

=== Fake news controversy ===
In 2020, Palhares began working for Brazil's Supreme Federal Court. In 2024, Paulo Gonet fired Palhares for allegedly disseminating fake news and messages calling for a coup d'etat against the government.

Sporting positions
Preceded by Vincenzo Sospiri	Formula Ford Festival Winner; 1989	Succeeded by Dave Coyne
