= Donny Crevels =

Dutch racing driver

- Nationality: (Netherlands) Dutch
- Born: 6 February 1974 (age 52) Amsterdam, Netherlands

Championship titles
- 1994 1998 2004: EFDA Nations Cup; Italian Formula Three; BRL V6

Donny Crevels (born 6 February 1974), nicknamed "the Don", is a Dutch racing driver. He has raced in such series as Le Mans Series, V8Star Series and the FIA GT Championship.

In 1998, Crevels won the Italian Formula Three Championship with Prema Powerteam. He previously won the 1994 EFDA Nations Cup for his country alongside Tom Coronel at Circuit Park Zandvoort - the pair were runners-up the following year. In 2004, he was the inaugural winner of the BRL V6 touring-car series.

== 24 Hours of Le Mans results ==
Year	Team	Co-Drivers	Car	Class	Laps	Pos.	Class Pos.
2001	(Netherlands) Racing for Holland	(Netherlands) Jan Lammers (Belgium) Val Hillebrand	Dome S101-Judd	LMP900	156	DNF	DNF
2005	(Netherlands) Spyker Squadron b.v.	(Netherlands) Tom Coronel (Netherlands) Peter van Merksteijn Sr.	Spyker C8 Spyder GT2-R	GT2	76	DNF	DNF
2006	(Netherlands) Spyker Squadron b.v.	(United Kingdom) Peter Dumbreck (Netherlands) Tom Coronel	Spyker C8 Spyder GT2-R	GT2	40	DNF	DNF

Sporting positions
Preceded by Oliver Martini	Italian Formula Three Champion; 1998	Succeeded by Peter Sundberg
