= Philipp Peter =

Austrian racing driver

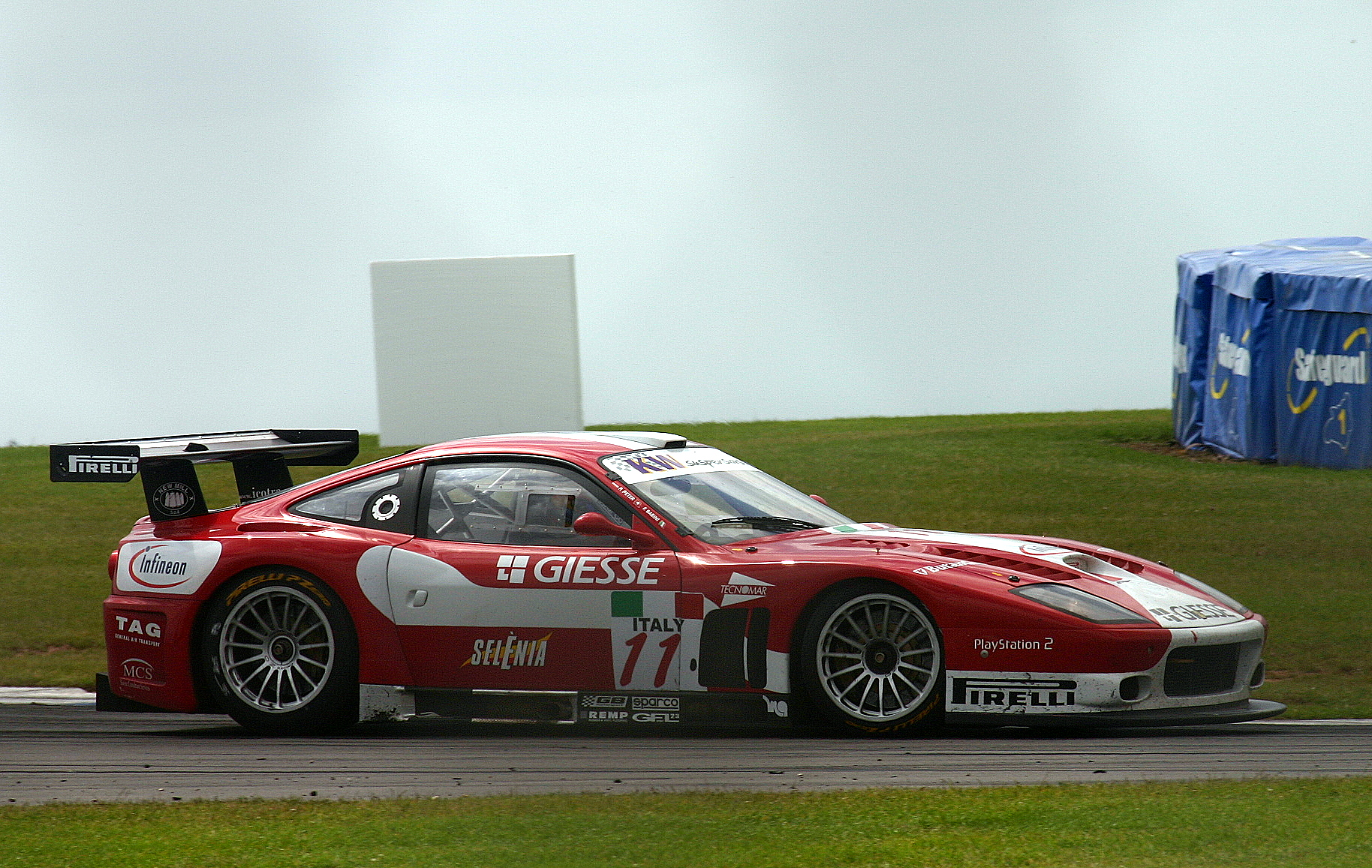
- Peter's Ferrari in 2004
- Nationality: (Austria) Austrian
- Born: 6 April 1969 (age 57) Vienna, Austria
- Categorisation: FIA Platinum (until 2012); FIA Gold (2013–)

24 Hours of Le Mans career
- Years: 2002, 2006–2007, 2009
- Teams: Audi Sport Team Joest, Swiss Spirit, PSI Experience, G.A.C Racing Team
- Best finish: 3rd (2002)
- Class wins: 0

Philipp Peter (born 6 April 1969 in Vienna) is a race car driver from Austria.

Peter started in junior formula cars with the highlight winning the Austria Formula 3 Cup in 1992. He represented Austria in the 1990 EFDA Nations Cup and also raced in Indy Lights finishing third in the Championship in 1999.

In 2003, Peter won the 12 Hours of Sebring in a Team Joest Audi R8 with teammates Marco Werner and Frank Biela. He previously competed in Indy Lights in 1998 and 1999, capturing victories in 1999 at Long Beach, Portland and Michigan and finishing 11th and third in series points in his two years, respectively.

In 2006, Peter raced in the FIA GT Championship for RaceAlliance Motorsport in an Aston Martin DBR9 with Karl Wendlinger, scoring one win in Mugello. For 2007 he remained in the FIA GT Championship, but this time for PSI Experience driving a Chevrolet Corvette C6.R with Luke Hines and scoring a second place in Zhuhai. He also ran for JMB Racing in a Maserati MC12 with Joe Macari, Ben Aucott, and Marino Franchitti in the Spa 24 Hours, finishing seventh. He later switched to the GT2 class at Nogaro, running an Advanced Engineering Ferrari F430 with Rui Águas and finishing seventh in class. For the last race of the 2007 season, Peter teamed once again with Luke Hines in an Aston Martin DBR9 for Gigaware Motorsport, but was unable to finish the event. Peter finished 26th in the GT1 Drivers Championship standings and 39th in the GT2 Drivers Championship Standings.

Peter also competed in the 2007 24 Hours of Le Mans with PSI Experience driving a Chevrolet Corvette C6.R with Claude-Yves Gosselin and David Hallyday, finishing 28th overall.

== Career results ==
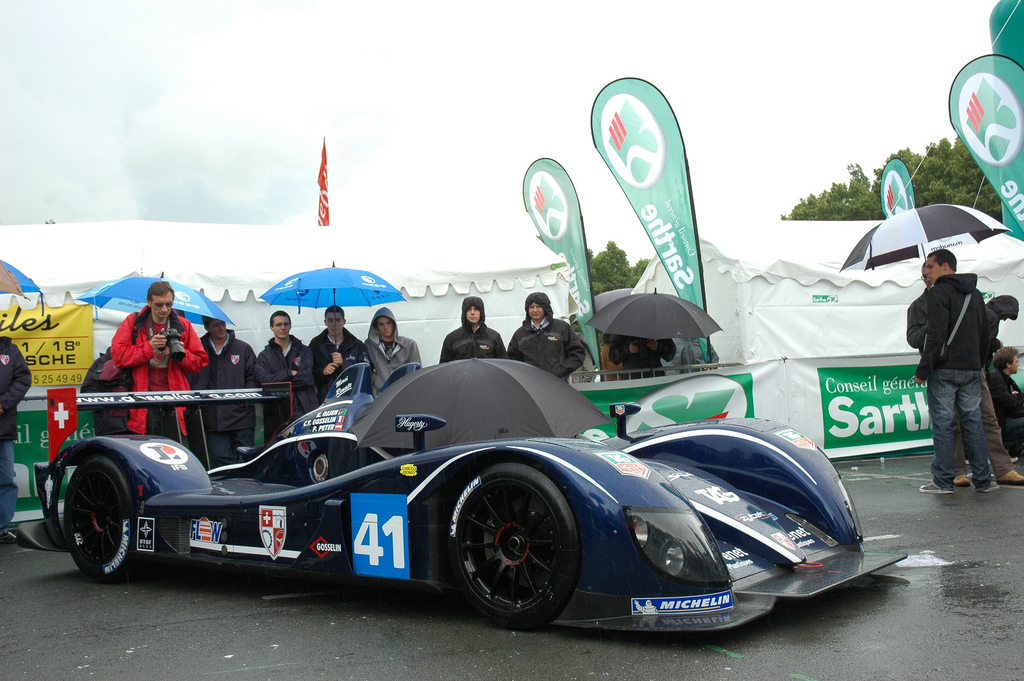
Peter's GAC Zytek at the scrutineering bay for the 2009 Le Mans 24 Hours.

=== Complete Japanese Touring Car Championship results ===
(key) (Races in bold indicate pole position) (Races in italics indicate fastest lap)

Year	Team	Car	1	2	3	4	5	6	7	8	9	10	11	12	13	14	15	16	Pos.	Pts
1995	HKS Opel Team Japan	Opel Vectra	FUJ; 1	FUJ; 2	SUG; 1	SUG; 2	TOK; 1	TOK; 2	SUZ; 1	SUZ; 2	MIN; 1	MIN; 2	AID; 1	AID; 2	SEN; 1	SEN; 2	FUJ; 1; 10	FUJ; 2; 22	29th	1

=== Complete Super Tourenwagen Cup results ===
(key) (Races in bold indicate pole position) (Races in italics indicate fastest lap)

Year	Team	Car	1	2	3	4	5	6	7	8	9	10	11	12	13	14	15	16	17	18	19	20	Pos.	Pts
1995	MIG Motorsport Interessen	Audi 80 Quattro	ZOL; 1; 8	ZOL; 2; 13	SPA; 1; 15	SPA; 2; 11	ÖST; 1; 21	ÖST; 2; 12	HOC; 1; 16	HOC; 2 Ret	NÜR; 1; 16	NÜR; 2; 21	SAL; 1; 18	SAL; 2; 19	AVU; 1; 13	AVU; 2 Ret	NÜR; 1; 15	NÜR; 2; 12					15th	122
1996	A.Z.K./ROC	Audi A4 Quattro	ZOL; 1; 2	ZOL; 2; 14	ASS; 1; 6	ASS; 2; 21	HOC; 1; 2	HOC; 2 Ret	SAC; 1; 1	SAC; 2; 19	WUN; 1; 12	WUN; 2; 6	ZWE; 1; 4	ZWE; 2; 17	SAL; 1; 10	SAL; 2; 11	AVU; 1 Ret	AVU; 2 Ret	NÜR; 1; 5	NÜR; 2; 4			9th	256
1997	A.Z.K./ROC	Audi A4 Quattro	HOC; 1; 16	HOC; 2; 14	ZOL; 1; 6	ZOL; 2; 5	NÜR; 1; 21	NÜR; 2 Ret	SAC; 1; 6	SAC; 2; 21	NOR; 1 Ret	NOR; 2; 8	WUN; 1; 17	WUN; 2; 19	ZWE; 1; 5	ZWE; 2; 3	SAL; 1; 16	SAL; 2; 15	REG; 1 Ret	REG; 2 Ret	NÜR; 1; 12	NÜR; 2; 17	16th	205

=== Complete Indy Lights results ===
Year	Team	1	2	3	4	5	6	7	8	9	10	11	12	13	14	Rank	Points
1998	Dorricott Racing	MIA; 11	LBH; 4	NZR; 19	STL; 2	MIL; 9	DET; 10	POR; 22	CLE; 7	TOR; 4	MIS; 23	TRS; 11	VAN; 9	LAG; 16	FON; 12	11th	62
1999	Dorricott Racing	MIA; 13	LBH; 1	NZR; 8	MIL; 11	POR; 1	CLE; 4	TOR; 7	MIS; 1	DET; 8	CHI; 12	LAG; 8	FON; 10			**3rd**	**101**

=== Complete 24 Hours of Le Mans results ===
Year	Team	Co-Drivers	Car	Class	Laps	Pos.	Class Pos.
2002	(Germany) Audi Sport Team Joest	(Germany) Marco Werner (Germany) Michael Krumm	Audi R8	LMP900	372	**3rd**	**3rd**
2006	(Switzerland) Swiss Spirit	(Switzerland) Harold Primat (Switzerland) Marcel Fässler	Courage LC70-Judd	LMP1	132	DNF	DNF
2007	(Belgium) PSI Experience	(France) Claude-Yves Gosselin (France) David Hallyday	Chevrolet Corvette C6.R	GT1	289	28th	12th
2009	(Switzerland) GAC Racing Team	(Saudi Arabia) Karim Ojjeh (France) Claude-Yves Gosselin	Zytek 07S/2	LMP2	102	DNF	DNF

Sporting positions
Preceded by Josef Neuhauser	Austria Formula 3 Cup champion 1992	Succeeded by Max Angelelli
