= Hubert Stromberger =

Austrian racing driver

Hubert Stromberger (born January 18, 1963) is a former Austrian racing driver from Weitensfeld im Gurktal. He competed in one CART Championship Car race for Project Indy in 1995 at Road America where he started 27th and finished 16th. He also attempted to qualify at the Mid-Ohio Sports Car Course a month later, but failed to make the race. Most of his driving success was in Formula Opel EFDA Nations Cup competition. He retired from competitive racing in 2001 and is now a racing instructor.

== Motorsports career results ==
=== American Open-Wheel ===
(key)

==== CART ====
| Year | Team | 1 | 2 | 3 | 4 | 5 | 6 | 7 | 8 | 9 | 10 | 11 | 12 | 13 | 14 | 15 | 16 | 17 | Rank | Points | Ref |
|---|---|---|---|---|---|---|---|---|---|---|---|---|---|---|---|---|---|---|---|---|---|
| 1995 | Project Indy | MIA | SRF | PHX | LBH | NAZ | INDY | MIL | DET | POR | ROA; 16 | TOR | CLE | MCH | MOH; DNQ | NHA | VAN | LAG | 38th | 0 | |
