= Diogo Castro Santos =

Portuguese racing driver (born 1969)

- Nationality: (Portugal) Portuguese
- Born: 26 April 1969 (age 57) Portugal

Diogo Castro Santos (born 26 April 1969) is a Portuguese racing driver. He has competed in such series as the EFDA Nations Cup and the German Formula Three Championship. He finished in second-place in the Masters of Formula 3 race of 1992.
