= 2001 Masters of Formula 3 =

Race details
Date	5 August 2001
Official name	Marlboro Masters of Formula 3
Location	Circuit Park Zandvoort, Netherlands
Course	4.3 km (2.7 mi)
Distance	25 laps, 107.5 km (66.8 mi)

Pole
Driver	(Japan) Takuma Sato	Carlin Motorsport
Time	1:33.677

Fastest Lap
Driver	(Japan) Takuma Sato	Carlin Motorsport
Time	1:35.240 (on lap 16 of 25)

Podium
First	(Japan) Takuma Sato	Carlin Motorsport
Second	(Germany) André Lotterer	Jaguar Racing
Third	(United Kingdom) Anthony Davidson	Carlin Motorsport

The 2001 Marlboro Masters of Formula 3 was the eleventh Masters of Formula 3 race held at the Circuit Park Zandvoort in Zandvoort, Netherlands on 5 August 2001. The 25-lap race was won by Takuma Sato, for Carlin Motorsport who started from the pole position and led every lap. André Lotterer of Jaguar Racing finished in second, 9.2 seconds behind Sato, whose teammate Anthony Davidson placed third.

== Drivers and teams ==
2001 Entry List
Team	No	Driver	Chassis (Note: All drivers competed in Dallara chassis; model listed.)	Engine	Main series
(France) Signature Competition	1	(France) Benoît Tréluyer	F399	Renault	All-Japan Formula Three
(France) Signature Competition	2	(France) Mathieu Zangarelli	F399	Renault	French Formula Three
(France) Signature Competition	3	(France) Bruno Besson	F399	Renault	French Formula Three
(United Kingdom) Carlin Motorsport	4	(Japan) Takuma Sato	F301	Mugen-Honda	British Formula 3
(United Kingdom) Carlin Motorsport	5	(United Kingdom) Anthony Davidson	F301	Mugen-Honda	British Formula 3
(France) Serge Saulnier	6	(Hong Kong) Marchy Lee	F301	Mugen-Honda	
(France) Serge Saulnier	7	(Japan) Ryo Fukuda	F301	Mugen-Honda	French Formula Three
(Germany) Opel Team BSR	8	(Japan) Toshihiro Kaneishi	F300	Opel	German Formula Three
(Germany) Opel Team BSR	9	(Germany) Frank Diefenbacher	F301	Opel	German Formula Three
(Germany) Opel Team BSR	11	(Austria) Bernhard Auinger	F399	Opel	German Formula Three
(United Kingdom) Manor Motorsport	12	(United Kingdom) Derek Hayes	F300	Mugen-Honda	British Formula 3
(United Kingdom) Manor Motorsport	14	(United States) Jeffrey Jones	F300	Mugen-Honda	British Formula 3
(United Kingdom) Manor Motorsport	15	(United Kingdom) Mark Taylor	F300	Mugen-Honda	British Formula 3
(Italy) RC Motorsport	16	(Italy) Paolo Montin	F300	Opel	All-Japan Formula Three
(Italy) RC Motorsport	17	(Italy) Cristiano Citron	F300	Opel	Italian Formula Three
(France) ASM Elf	18	(France) Tristan Gommendy	F300	Renault	French Formula Three
(France) ASM Elf	19	(Portugal) Tiago Monteiro	F300	Renault	French Formula Three
(Germany) ADAC Berlin-Brandenburg	20	(Germany) Stefan Mücke	F301	Opel	German Formula Three
(Germany) ADAC Berlin-Brandenburg	21	(Germany) Markus Winkelhock	F300	Opel	German Formula Three
(United Kingdom) Jaguar Racing	22	(Germany) André Lotterer	F300	Mugen-Honda	British Formula 3
(United Kingdom) Jaguar Racing	23	(Australia) James Courtney	F300	Mugen-Honda	British Formula 3
(Germany) GM Motorsport	24	(Denmark) Nicolas Kiesa	F301	Toyota	German Formula Three
(Germany) GM Motorsport	25	(Germany) Tony Schmidt	F301	Toyota	German Formula Three
(Germany) GM Motorsport	26	(Austria) Hannes Lachinger	F301	Toyota	German Formula Three
(United Kingdom) Alan Docking Racing	28	(United Kingdom) Andy Priaulx	F301	Mugen-Honda	British Formula 3
(Italy) Prema Powerteam	29	(Sweden) Björn Wirdheim	F301	Opel	German Formula Three
(Italy) Prema Powerteam	30	(Japan) Kosuke Matsuura	F301	Opel	German Formula Three
(Italy) Prema Powerteam	32	(Australia) Ryan Briscoe	F300	Opel	German Formula Three
(United Kingdom) Team Avanti	33	(United Kingdom) Matthew Davies	F301	Opel	British Formula 3
(Italy) Cram Competition	34	(Italy) Matteo Grassotto	F301	Opel	German Formula Three
(Italy) Cram Competition	35	(Italy) Raffaele Giammaria	F301	Opel	German Formula Three
(United Kingdom) Fortec Motorsport	36	(United States) Alex Gurney	F301	Renault	British Formula 3
(United Kingdom) Fortec Motorsport	37	(Italy) Gianmaria Bruni	F301	Renault	British Formula 3
(Italy) Target Racing	38	(Japan) Sakon Yamamoto	F301	Opel	All-Japan Formula Three
(Germany) MOL-Trella Motorsport	39	(Hungary) Zsolt Baumgartner	F300	Opel	German Formula Three
(Switzerland) Swiss Racing Team	40	(Finland) Kari Mäenpää	F399	Opel	German Formula Three
(Switzerland) Swiss Racing Team	41	(Brazil) João Paulo de Oliveira	F399	Opel	German Formula Three
(United Kingdom) Duma Racing	42	(United Kingdom) Ryan Dalziel	F301	Mugen-Honda	British Formula 3
(United Kingdom) Duma Racing	43	(United Kingdom) Jamie Spence	F301	Mugen-Honda	British Formula 3
(United Kingdom) Promatecme UK	44	(France) Bruce Jouanny	F301	Mugen-Honda	British Formula 3
(United Kingdom) Promatecme UK	45	(Japan) Atsushi Katsumata	F301	Mugen-Honda	British Formula 3
(Netherlands) Van Amersfoort Racing	46	(Denmark) Allan Simonsen	F300	Opel	German Formula Three
(Netherlands) Van Amersfoort Racing	47	(Netherlands) Marco du Pau	F399	Opel	German Formula Three
(Belgium) JB Motorsport	48	(Belgium) Tom van Bavel	F399	Opel	German Formula Three
(Belgium) JB Motorsport	49	(Belgium) Nicolas Stelandre	F399	Opel	German Formula Three

== Classification ==
=== Qualifying ===
==== Group A ====
Pos	No	Driver	Team	Q1 Time	Rank	Q2 Time	Rank	Gap
1	1	(France) Benoît Tréluyer	Signature Competition	1:33.785	1	1:34.899	6	
2	19	(Portugal) Tiago Monteiro	ASM Elf	1:34.034	2	1:35.402	15	+0.249
3	7	(Japan) Ryo Fukuda	Serge Saulnier	1:34.461	7	1:34.211	1	+0.426
4	37	(Italy) Gianmaria Bruni	Fortec Motorsport	1:34.505	9	1:34.248	2	+0.463
5	5	(United Kingdom) Anthony Davidson	Carlin Motorsport	1:34.282	3	1:34.336	3	+0.497
6	25	(Germany) Tony Schmidt	GM Motorsport	1:34.290	4	1:34.672	4	+0.505
7	15	(United Kingdom) Mark Taylor	Manor Motorsport	1:34.394	5	1:35.161	11	+0.609
8	41	(Brazil) João Paulo de Oliveira	Swiss Racing Team	1:34.428	6	1:35.341	13	+0.643
9	33	(United Kingdom) Matthew Davies	Team Avanti	1:34.504	8	1:35.124	10	+0.719
10	49	(Belgium) Nicolas Stelandre	JB Motorsport	1:35.028	16	1:34.689	5	+0.904
11	23	(Australia) James Courtney	Jaguar Racing	1:34.802	10	1:35.239	12	+1.017
12	3	(France) Bruno Besson	Signature Competition	1:34.834	11	1:35.657	19	+1.049
13	45	(Japan) Atsushi Katsumata	Promatecme UK	1:34.860	12	1:35.379	14	+1.075
14	47	(Netherlands) Marco du Pau	Van Amersfoort Racing	1:36.787	21	1:34.926	7	+1.141
15	39	(Hungary) Zsolt Baumgartner	MOL-Trella Motorsport	1:34.942	13	1:34.980	9	+1.157
16	21	(Germany) Markus Winkelhock	ADAC Berlin-Brandenburg	1:35.194	19	1:34.971	8	+1.186
17	11	(Austria) Bernhard Auinger	Opel Team BSR	1:34.996	14	1:35.763	20	+1.211
18	9	(Germany) Frank Diefenbacher	Opel Team BSR	1:35.015	15	1:35.437	16	+1.230
19	35	(Italy) Raffaele Giammaria	Cram Competition	1:35.081	17	1:35.784	21	+1.296
20	43	(United Kingdom) Jamie Spence	Duma Racing	1:35.184	18	1:35.467	18	+1.399
21	29	(Sweden) Björn Wirdheim	Prema Powerteam	1:35.606	20	1:35.443	17	+1.658
22	17	(Italy) Cristiano Citron	RC Motorsport	1:38.492	22	1:37.242	22	+3.457

==== Group B ====
Pos	No	Driver	Team	Q1 Time	Rank	Q2 Time	Rank	Gap
1	4	(Japan) Takuma Sato	Carlin Motorsport	1:33.677	1	1:33.978	1	
2	44	(France) Bruce Jouanny	Promatecme UK	1:38.015	23	1:34.216	2	+0.539
3	22	(Germany) André Lotterer	Jaguar Racing	1:34.265	2	1:34.535	3	+0.588
4	8	(Japan) Toshihiro Kaneishi	Opel Team BSR	1:34.321	3	1:34.833	4	+0.644
5	48	(Belgium) Tom van Bavel	JB Motorsport	1:34.391	4	1:35.217	9	+0.714
6	24	(Denmark) Nicolas Kiesa	GM Motorsport	1:34.404	5	1:35.150	7	+0.727
7	12	(United Kingdom) Derek Hayes	Manor Motorsport	1:34.516	6	1:35.167	8	+0.839
8	18	(France) Tristan Gommendy	ASM Elf	1:34.562	7	1:36.590	22	+0.885
9	28	(United Kingdom) Andy Priaulx	Alan Docking Racing	1:34.620	8	1:35.364	12	+0.943
10	2	(France) Mathieu Zangarelli	Signature Competition	1:34.731	9	1:35.417	13	+1.054
11	14	(United States) Jeffrey Jones	Manor Motorsport	1:34.744	10	1:35.241	10	+1.067
12	16	(Italy) Paolo Montin	RC Motorsport	1:34.772	11	1:35.550	15	+1.095
13	30	(Japan) Kosuke Matsuura	Prema Powerteam	1:34.828	12	1:35.109	6	+1.151
14	42	(United Kingdom) Ryan Dalziel	Duma Racing	1:34.920	13	1:36.281	20	+1.243
15	20	(Germany) Stefan Mücke	ADAC Berlin-Brandenburg	1:34.943	14	1:35.566	16	+1.266
16	32	(Australia) Ryan Briscoe	Prema Powerteam	1:34.974	15	1:35.283	11	+1.297
17	26	(Austria) Hannes Lachinger	GM Motorsport	1:35.160	16	1:35.022	5	+1.345
18	40	(Finland) Kari Mäenpää	Swiss Racing Team	1:35.204	17	1:35.646	17	+1.527
19	36	(United States) Alex Gurney	Fortec Motorsport	1:35.345	18	1:35.527	14	+1.668
20	34	(Italy) Matteo Grassotto	Cram Competition	1:35.578	19	1:36.362	21	+1.901
21	6	(Hong Kong) Marchy Lee	Serge Saulnier	1:36.318	21	1:35.795	18	+2.118
22	38	(Japan) Sakon Yamamoto	Target Racing	1:35.956	20	1:37.097	23	+2.279
23	46	(Denmark) Allan Simonsen	Van Amersfoort Racing	1:36.638	22	1:35.992	19	+2.315

=== Race ===
Pos	No	Driver	Team	Laps	Time/Retired	Grid
1	4	(Japan) Takuma Sato	Carlin Motorsport	25	39:58.870	1
2	22	(Germany) André Lotterer	Jaguar Racing	25	+9.228	5
3	5	(United Kingdom) Anthony Davidson	Carlin Motorsport	25	+9.687	10
4	37	(Italy) Gianmaria Bruni	Fortec Motorsport	25	+17.281	8
5	19	(Portugal) Tiago Monteiro	ASM Elf	25	+18.038	4
6	15	(United Kingdom) Mark Taylor	Manor Motorsport	25	+20.617	14
7	8	(Japan) Toshihiro Kaneishi	Opel Team BSR	25	+21.978	7
8	25	(Germany) Tony Schmidt	GM Motorsport	25	+22.307	12
9	7	(Japan) Ryo Fukuda	Serge Saulnier	25	+22.990	6
10	12	(United Kingdom) Derek Hayes	Manor Motorsport	25	+26.285	13
11	33	(United Kingdom) Matthew Davies	Team Avanti	25	+31.944	18
12	23	(Australia) James Courtney	Jaguar Racing	25	+32.326	22
13	41	(Brazil) João Paulo de Oliveira	Swiss Racing Team	25	+36.817	16
14	47	(Netherlands) Marco du Pau	Van Amersfoort Racing	25	+37.766	28
15	14	(United States) Jeffrey Jones	Manor Motorsport	25	+38.236	21
16	18	(France) Tristan Gommendy	ASM Elf	25	+42.998	15
17	42	(United Kingdom) Ryan Dalziel	Duma Racing	25	+45.335	27
18	20	(Germany) Stefan Mücke	ADAC Berlin-Brandenburg	25	+46.071	29
19	9	(Germany) Frank Diefenbacher	Opel Team BSR	25	+47.780	36
20	35	(Italy) Raffaele Giammaria	Cram Competition	25	+48.296	37
21	3	(France) Bruno Besson	Signature Competition	25	+48.709	24
22	28	(United Kingdom) Andy Priaulx	Alan Docking Racing	25	+50.623	17
23	30	(Japan) Kosuke Matsuura	Prema Powerteam	25	+57.423	25
24	1	(France) Benoît Tréluyer	Signature Competition	25	+1:09.482	2
25	40	(Finland) Kari Mäenpää	Swiss Racing Team	25	+1:09.608	35
26	48	(Belgium) Tom van Bavel	JB Motorsport	25	+1:10.077	9
27	11	(Austria) Bernhard Auinger	Opel Team BSR	25	+1:11.151	34
28	39	(Hungary) Zsolt Baumgartner	MOL-Trella Motorsport	25	+1:22.824	30
29	44	(France) Bruce Jouanny	Promatecme UK	25	+1:26.274	3
30	49	(Belgium) Nicolas Stelandre	JB Motorsport	24	Retired	20
Ret	32	(Australia) Ryan Briscoe	Prema Powerteam	21	Retired	31
Ret	26	(Austria) Hannes Lachinger	GM Motorsport	17	Retired	33
Ret	24	(Denmark) Nicolas Kiesa	GM Motorsport	11	Retired	11
Ret	45	(Japan) Atsushi Katsumata	Promatecme UK	4	Retired	26
Ret	2	(France) Mathieu Zangarelli	Signature Competition	4	Retired	19
Ret	21	(Germany) Markus Winkelhock	ADAC Berlin-Brandenburg	1	Retired	32
Ret	16	(Italy) Paolo Montin	RC Motorsport	0	Retired	23
DNQ	43	(United Kingdom) Jamie Spence	Duma Racing			
DNQ	29	(Sweden) Björn Wirdheim	Prema Powerteam			
DNQ	17	(Italy) Cristiano Citron	RC Motorsport			
DNQ	36	(United States) Alex Gurney	Fortec Motorsport			
DNQ	34	(Italy) Matteo Grassotto	Cram Competition			
DNQ	6	(Hong Kong) Marchy Lee	Serge Saulnier			
DNQ	38	(Japan) Sakon Yamamoto	Target Racing			
DNQ	46	(Denmark) Allan Simonsen	Van Amersfoort Racing			
Fastest lap: Takuma Sato, 1:35.240, 162.537 km/h (100.996 mph) on lap 16
