= 2003 Macau Grand Prix =

Formula Three motor race

Race details
Date	16 November 2003
Location	Guia Circuit, Macau
Course	Temporary street circuit 6.120 km (3.803 mi)
Distance	25 laps, 152.925 km (95.023 mi)
- First leg

Pole
Driver	(Brazil) Fábio Carbone	Signature Team
Time	2:13.016

Fastest Lap
Driver	(Australia) James Courtney	TOM'S
Time	2:13.381

Podium
First	(Australia) James Courtney	TOM'S
Second	(France) Nicolas Lapierre	Signature Team
Third	(United States) Richard Antinucci	Hitech Racing
- Second leg
Driver	(Australia) James Courtney	TOM'S

Fastest Lap
Driver	(Australia) James Courtney	TOM'S
Time	2:12.937

Podium
First	(France) Nicolas Lapierre	Signature Team
Second	(Brazil) Fábio Carbone	Signature Team
Third	(Japan) Katsuyuki Hiranaka	Prema Powerteam

The 2003 Macau Grand Prix (formally the 50th Macau Grand Prix) was a Formula Three (F3) motor race held on the streets of Macau on 16 November 2003. Unlike other races, such as the Masters of Formula 3, the 2003 Macau Grand Prix was not a part of any F3 championship, but was open to entries from all F3 championships. The race was divided into two legs: the first leg, which lasted ten laps, was held in the morning. The afternoon leg lasted fifteen laps. The driver who completed all 25 laps in the shortest time was declared the overall winner. The 2003 event was the 50th Macau Grand Prix and the 21st for F3 cars.

Nicolas Lapierre of Signature Plus won the event after finishing second in the first leg, which was won by James Courtney of TOM'S. Four laps from the finish, Lapierre took the lead after Courtney suffered a puncture running over carbon fibre debris and crashed into the wall at the Melco hairpin. Lapierre became the first rookie to win in Macau since David Coulthard in 1991. Fábio Carbone's sister Signature Plus car finished second and Prema Powerteam's Katsuyuki Hiranaka was third.

== Background and entry list ==
The Macau Grand Prix is a Formula Three (F3) race that has been dubbed the territory's most prestigious international sporting event and a stepping stone to higher motorsport categories such as Formula One. The 2003 Macau Grand Prix was the race's 50th edition and the 21st to be held to F3 rules. It took place on the 6.2 km (3.9 mi) 22-turn Guia Circuit on 16 November 2003 with three preceding days of practice and qualifying.

Drivers were required to compete in a Fédération Internationale de l'Automobile (FIA)-regulated championship race during the calendar year, either in the Formula 3 Euro Series or one of the domestic championships, with the highest-placed drivers receiving priority in receiving an invitation to the race. Three of the four major F3 series were represented on the Macau 30-car grid by their respective champions. Ryan Briscoe, the F3 Euro Series champion, was joined in Macau by Japanese F3 series winner James Courtney and Italian champion Fausto Ippoliti. The best ranked British F3 Championship representative was Nelson Piquet Jr. and he was joined by its scholarship champion E. J. Viso. Race organisers invited five drivers from outside of F3 to enter the race. They were Lewis Hamilton, the Formula Renault 2.0 UK champion, who had been entered after improving his performance at the British series round at Brands Hatch. World Series by Nissan driver Narain Karthikeyan and Macau natives Lei Kit Meng, Michael Ho and Jo Merszei.

== Practice and qualifying ==
There were two one-hour practice sessions preceding Sunday's race: one on Thursday morning and one on Friday morning. Courtney, a pre-race favourite, lapped fastest early in the first practice session at 2:14.724, 0.744 seconds quicker than Pierre Kaffer in second. Richard Antinucci, Tatsuya Kataoka, Karthikeyan, Fábio Carbone, Briscoe, Katsuyuki Hiranaka, Robert Kubica and Paolo Montin made up positions three through ten. Three incidents occurred during the session. Hamilton collided with Kataoka at Fisherman's Bend corner and spun into a barrier. Marco Bonanomi hit a wall at Dona Maria Bend corner and Fairuz Fauzy braked too late for Lisboa turn and struck the barrier.

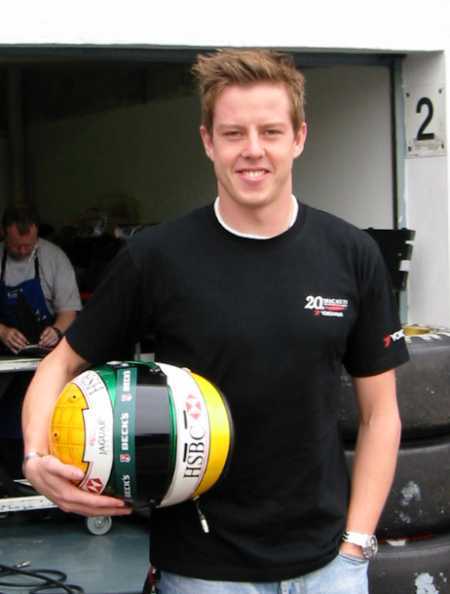
James Courtney (pictured in 2002) held provisional pole position on Friday but lost it to Fábio Carbone the following day because of changes to his gear ratio that slowed him.

Qualifying was divided into two 45-minute sessions; the first was held on Thursday afternoon, and the second on Friday afternoon. Each driver's fastest time from either session was used to determine their starting position for Sunday's race. The first qualifying session was delayed by 35 minutes due to an incident during practice for the Porsche Carrera Cup Asia race in which an unknown driver dented an Armco barrier at the pit lane exit, requiring course officials to repair it. When the session did start in overcast but warm weather, several drivers occupied provisional pole position, until Courtney avoided using new tyres to go fastest at 2:13.232. Carbone was six-tenths of a second behind in second after leading for much of the session. Kaffer was consistently in the top four and was provisionally third. Kataoka took fourth and Robert Doornbos fifth. Nicolas Lapierre took sixth after correcting a ride height issue that had slowed him in practice, ahead of Montin and Piquet. Karthikeyan and César Campaniço were ninth and tenth. Antinucci was the fastest driver who did not enter the top ten, after briefly holding provisional pole. Following Antinucci were Nico Rosberg, Álvaro Parente and Hiranaka. Briscoe was 15th after failing to replicate a faster pace. Fauzy, Pedro Barral, Andrew Thompson, Hamilton, Ronnie Quintarelli. Danny Watts, Viso, Naoki Yokomizo, Bonanomi, Ho, Rob Austin, Hiroki Yoshimoto, Kubica, Lei and Merszei completed the order. The session was disrupted with two red flags as some drivers ventured off the track. Viso spun on the approach to Police Bend and landed sideways on a narrow section of track. Kubica was nearby and attempted to avoid Viso, but he hit the wall and ricocheted off his nose cone. As a result, the circuit became impassable, and the session was halted to allow officials to move the damaged cars. The second stoppage came after Barral spun entering the Melco hairpin and blocked the track. Yellow flags were later needed at the R-Bend turn after Piquet removed his left-rear wheel striking the wall.

In the second half an hour practice session, Courtney lapped fastest at 2:13.566, three-tenths of a second ahead of Antinucci. Kataoka, Lapierre, Doornbos, Montin, Rosberg, Kaffer, Yoshimoto and Carbone placed third through tenth. The session's first stoppage happened when Austin had an accident and Yokomizo crashed heavily at San Francisco Bend corner. Piquet, Barral, Briscoe and Hiranaka also sustained car damage.

The start of the second qualifying session was delayed by 25 minutes due to multiple incidents and crashes in second practice and qualifying for the Porsche Carrera Cup Asia race. When it did start, most drivers saved two sets of tyres for Sunday's race but nobody went faster early on. Although heavy traffic prevented Courtney from going laster, he maintained pole position until Carbone took it late on with a 2:13.016 lap. However, Carbone's session ended early spinning into the wall at San Francisco Bend corner trying to lap quicker. Briscoe pushed hard and joined Carbone on the grid's front row despite replacing a wishbone on his suspension after spinning into a barrier at Fisherman's Bend early on. Courtney dropped to third after a gear ratio change slowed him. Lapierre improved to fourth while Kaffer fell to fifth. Antinucci also went faster and gained five places to qualify sixth despite going off at Lisboa turn. Rosberg, seventh, clipped the wall at Police bend. Kataoka was eighth and Montin ninth. Doornbos crashed at Lisboa corner and fell five places to tenth. Parente, Fauzy, Piquet, Kubica, Campaniço, Watts, Karthikeyan, Hamilton, Yoshimoto, Quintarelli, Thompson, Barral, Hiranaka, Viso, Austin, Ho, Yokomizo, Bonanomi, Lei and Merszei completed the starting order. Another major incident occurred during the session, as other drivers went off the track: the ill Karthiekyan could not control his car and pulled over at Police bend.

=== Qualifying classification ===
Each of the driver's fastest lap times from the two qualifying sessions are denoted in bold.

Final qualifying classification
Pos	No.	Driver	Team	Q1 Time	Rank	Q2 Time	Rank	Gap	Grid
1	16	(Brazil) Fábio Carbone	Signature Team	2:13.835	2	**2:13.016**	1	—	1
2	1	(Australia) Ryan Briscoe	Prema Powerteam	2:15.894	15	**2:13.223**	2	+0.207	2
3	9	(Australia) James Courtney	TOM'S	**2:13.232**	1	2:13.237	3	+0.216	3
4	17	(France) Nicolas Lapierre	Signature Team	2:14.900	6	**2:13.270**	4	+0.254	4
5	37	(Germany) Pierre Kaffer	TME Racing	2:14.126	3	**2:13.506**	5	+0.490	5
6	11	(United States) Richard Antinucci	Hitech Racing	2:15.572	11	**2:13.514**	6	+0.498	6
7	6	(Germany) Nico Rosberg	Carlin Motorsport	2:15.644	12	**2:13.906**	7	+0.890	7
8	10	(Japan) Tatsuya Kataoka	TOM'S	2:14.212	4	**2:14.910**	8	+0.894	8
9	23	(Italy) Paolo Montin	ThreeBond Racing	2:15.071	7	**2:13.958**	9	+0.942	9
10	20	(Netherlands) Robert Doornbos	Menu Motorsport	2:14.719	5	**2:14.146**	10	+1.130	10
11	5	(Portugal) Álvaro Parente	Carlin Motorsport	2:15.686	13	**2:14.593**	11	+1.577	11
12	36	(Malaysia) Fairuz Fauzy	Promatecme	2:15.922	16	**2:14.728**	12	+1.712	12
13	12	(Brazil) Nelson Piquet Jr.	Hitech Racing	2:15.075	8	**2:14.949**	13	+1.933	13
14	25	(Poland) Robert Kubica	Target Racing	2:20.406	28	**2:14.965**	14	+1.949	14
15	18	(Portugal) César Campaniço	Signature Team	2:15.506	10	**2:15.001**	15	+1.985	15
16	30	(United Kingdom) Danny Watts	Alan Docking Racing	2:17.218	21	**2:15.050**	16	+2.034	16
17	4	(India) Narain Karthikeyan	Carlin Motorsport	**2:15.135**	9	2:15.381	19	+2.119	17
18	27	(United Kingdom) Lewis Hamilton	Manor Motorsport	2:16.636	19	**2:15.160**	17	+2.144	18
19	32	(Japan) Hiroki Yoshimoto	Swiss Racing Team	2:19.483	27	**2:15.189**	18	+2.173	19
20	21	(Italy) Ronnie Quintarelli	JB Motorsport with Inging	2:17.069	20	**2:15.478**	20	+2.462	20
21	15	(United Kingdom) Andrew Thompson	Hitech Racing	2:16.597	18	**2:15.515**	21	+2.499	21
22	31	(Spain) Pedro Barral	Swiss Racing Team	2:16.568	17	**2:15.782**	22	+2.766	22
23	2	(Japan) Katsuyuki Hiranaka	Prema Powerteam	**2:15.854**	14	2:16.114	24	+2.838	23
24	33	(Venezuela) E. J. Viso	Promatecme	2:18.163	22	**2:16.006**	23	+2.990	24
25	19	(United Kingdom) Rob Austin	Menu Motorsport	2:18.934	26	**2:16.368**	25	+3.352	25
26	38	(Macau) Michael Ho	TME Racing	2:18.896	25	**2:16.877**	26	+3.861	26
27	22	(Japan) Naoki Yokomizo	JB Motorsport with Inging	**2:18.183**	23	No Time		+5.167	27
28	26	(Italy) Marco Bonanomi	Target Racing	**2:18.247**	24	2:20.730	28	+5.231	28
29	28	(Macau) Lei Kit Meng	Manor Motorsport	2:22.298	29	**2:20.537**	27	+7.521	29
30	29	(Macau) Jo Merszei	Alan Docking Racing	2:29.289	30	**2:24.503**	29	+11.487	30
110% qualifying time: 2:26.317
**Bold time** indicates the faster of the two times that determined the grid order.

== Warm-up ==
A 20-minute warm-up session was held on the morning of the race. Antinucci led with a lap time of 2:14.048 seconds, faster than he had been in any previous session. Carbone was a tenth of a second behind in second and Piquet followed close behind in third. Kataoka, Doornbos, Kaffer, Briscoe, Montin, Rosberg and Kubica completed warm-up's top ten drivers. The field was reduced to 29 cars after warm-up but before the first leg of the race because Karthikeyan was withdrawn after the FIA medical delegate diagnosed him with glandular fever.

== Race ==
Sunday's race was divided into two aggregate legs totalling 30 laps. The first 15-lap leg took place in the morning, and the results determined the starting order for the second leg, with the winner starting from pole position. Following that, a five-hour interval was observed to allow for the intervening support races. The second 15-lap leg began later in the afternoon. The driver who completed all 30 laps in the quickest time took overall victory.

=== Leg 1 ===
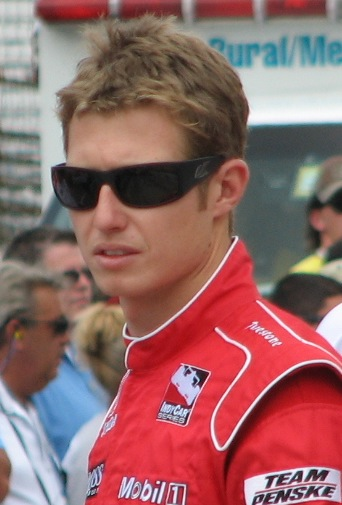
Ryan Briscoe (pictured in 2009) took the lead from Carbone entering Reservoir Bend turn but lost it when he went wide at Lisboa corner and failed to return to the top three.

The race's first leg began in overcast but dry weather at 09:15 Macau Standard Time (UTC+08:00) on 16 November. On the formation lap, one of Piquet's tyres shredded up into Moorish Hill, detached and shattered his front wing. Piquet stopped in the pit lane and ran to the grid to seek a mechanic from his team; repairs could not be completed before the start. Briscoe got off to a quick start, drawing alongside pole sitter Carbone on the inside into Reservoir Bend. Briscoe took the lead after touching wheels with Carbone. Briscoe maintained the lead for a short time, but ran wide approaching the Lisboa turn after overspeeding, allowing Carbone back through. Lapierre and Courtney used the situation to claim second and third from Briscoe. Further down the order, Kaffer tried to pass Montin on the inside but hit a barrier on the outside. As Kaffer ricocheted across the track, Rosberg rolled over one of the stricken vehicles and rested upside down on the circuit. Parente also got caught up in the incident and retired. Watts then sustained front wing damage but returned to the pit lane for a new nose cone before retiring a lap later.

Because of the wreckage, the safety car was used to allow a crane to remove all of the damaged vehicles. The safety car remained on the track until the third lap began. Lapierre immediately challenged Carbone, causing Carbone's right-side front wing endplate to break and launch into the air. Lapierre consequently took the lead passing Carbone into Lisboa corner and Courtney followed suit. Carbone then fell behind Briscoe, who had moved to fourth, and Antinucci challenged him. Meanwhile, Austin advanced to 13th after starting 25th. At the front, Lapierre withstood Courtney's pressure and responded by setting the race's fastest lap at the time, a circuit of 2:15.704 on the fifth lap. Courtney was unfazed by Lapierre and took the lead on lap six by passing him on the outside at Lisboa corner. Meanwhile, Kataoka passed Doornbos and Hamilton overtook Kubica.

On lap seven, Katoka and Hamilton gained another position when a frustrated Briscoe collided with Carbone in an attempt to pass for third after Carbone spun after braking 30 ft (9.1 m) earlier at Lisboa corner. Briscoe was stuck in the Lisboa turn's escape road, attempting to restart his car, and Antinucci moved into third. Kataoka was now duelling Carbone, but a traffic error while attempting to overtake Carbone into the Lisboa turn forced him to abandon the duel and drive onto the escape road to avoid colliding with Carbone. Katoka was now pressured by Hamilton who overtook Doornbos on lap nine but re-passed him at Lisboa corner on the final lap before Doornbos' drive shaft broke and lost positions. Courtney increased his lead to 4.6 seconds to win and begin the second leg from pole position, joined by Lapierre on the grid's front row. The last of the finishers were Antinucci, Carbone, Hamilton, Kubica, Fauzy, Thompson, Quintarelli, Hiranaka, Austin, Viso, Yoshimoto, Doornbos, Briscoe, Ho, Bonanomi, Lei, Merszei and Barral. Other retirements included Campaniço, Kataoka and Piquet who damaged their cars after hitting the wall.

=== Leg 2 ===
The race's second leg began later that day at 15:55 local time in cloudy weather and on a dry track. Yoshimoto removed his front wing and replaced it before the second leg began. Courtney led a close behind Lapierre into Reservoir Bend . Hamilton advanced to third place but was involved in a multi-car accident. Hamilton was slow leaving the turn, causing him to run wide, and Kubica challenged him on the inside approaching San Francisco Bend. Kubica hit a tyre wall and ricocheted into the approaching field. Following a minor collision with Hamilton's right-rear tyre, Antnucci drifted into a wall, and his front wing broke Hamilton's front track rod. Thompson, Antinucci's teammate, also hit a barrier. The incidents necessitated the safety car's deployment for two laps while track marshals removed the wrecked cars. At the restart, Courtney was first, followed by Lapierre, whose series of initial attacks on Courtney to take the lead were unsuccessful. Under the safety car, Hamilton noticed he had a punctured tyre from the contact with Antinucci. He allowed Carbone through just before the start/finish line to alert race officials to the puncture; he retired in the pit lane at the end of lap three. Meanwhile, Viso retired on the lap with car damage caused by debris.

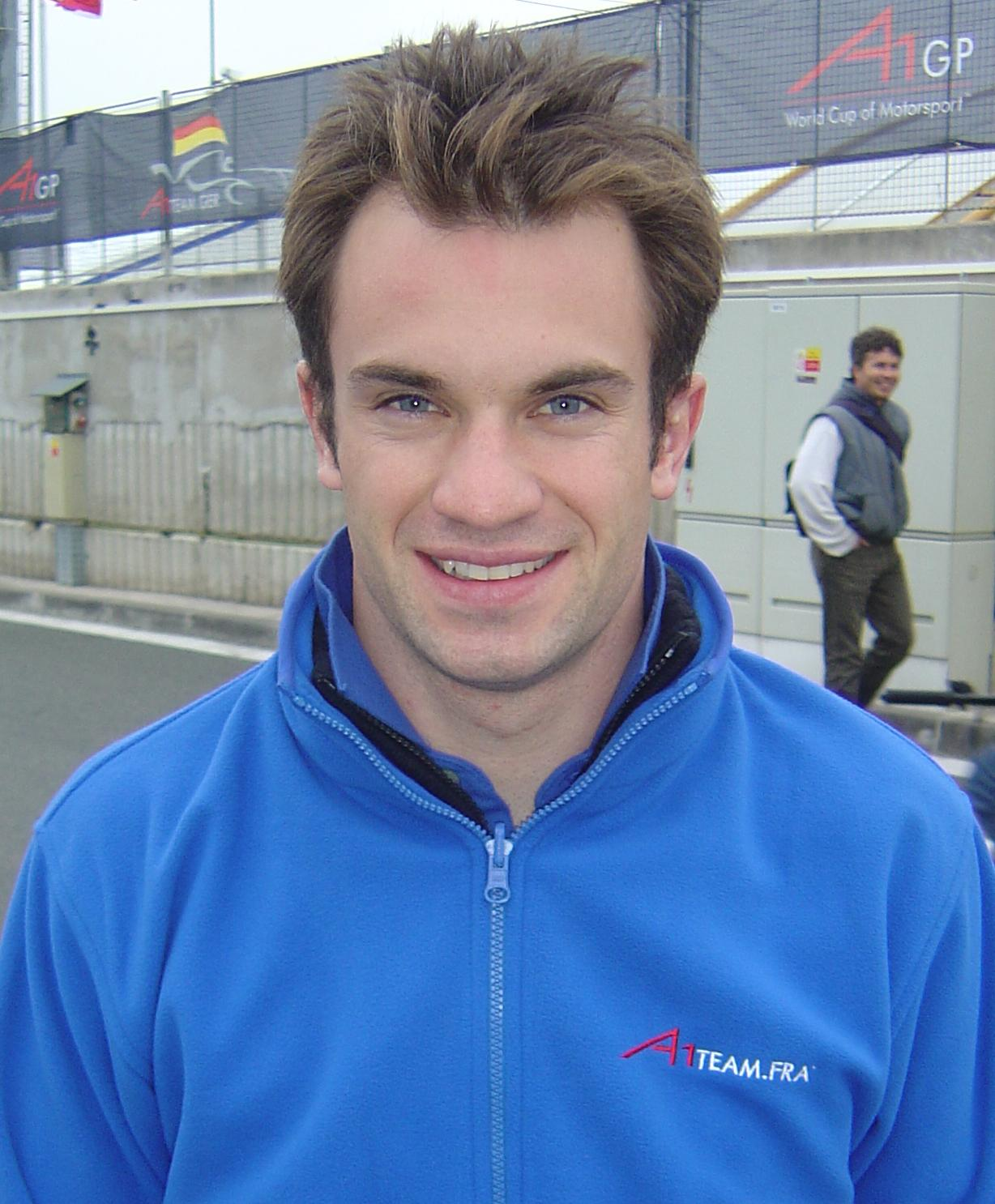
Nicolas Lapierre (pictured in 2007) won the Grand Prix overall after James Courtney picked up a puncture that put him into the wall at the Melco hairpin on lap eleven.

Lapierre was underneath Courtney's car each time he entered the Melco hairpin; Courtney gained a small advantage on the circuit's straights because his engine was more powerful than Lapierre's. This was true until Lapierre drew closer to Courtney by setting the race's fastest lap and Courtney responded by doing the same lap after lap. It gave Courtney a small lead, negating the slipstream effect that Lapierre would have had if he had been nearby. Meanwhile, Carbone received a drive-through penalty for passing Hamilton before the start/finish line. It was rescinded after race officials realised Hamilton's puncture prevented Carbone from backing out of the manoeuvre. Carbone responded by lapping faster than the top two, but Lapierre reacted almost immediately and began to close the gap on Courtney. Lapierre got close enough to overtake entering the Lisboa turn but Courtney stopped him.

Parente was forced to retire in the pit lane on lap seven due to an oil leak. Meanwhile, Austin lost part of his front wing and led a group of cars that included Rosberg who sought a way past but Piquet was close by. Piquet then stopped attacking, allowing Rosberg to focus on Austin. He drew alongside Austin, only to see him pull back before the latter stopped for a new front wing. Courtney focused on increasing his lead at the front, recording the weekend's fastest lap of 2:12.937 on the tenth lap, and it appeared he would win the race easily. On lap 11, however, Courtney was two seconds ahead of Lapierre when stray carbon fibre debris from an earlier incident punctured his right-rear tyre. That rendered Courtney unable to steer and he struck a barrier leaving the Melco hairpin, removing his front-right suspension and damaged the bodywork. Although Courtney was unhurt, Lapierre took the lead.

Kaffer was hassling Kataoka for sixth but this became fifth when Doornbos' gearbox failed on lap 14. Doornbos' retirement promoted Hiranaka to third as Kaffer overtook Kataoka for fifth. On the final lap, Kataoka crashed against a trackside wall and retired. On his maiden appearance in Macau, it was Lapierre's overall victory, completing the second leg in a time of 37:0.078, and achieving the first win for a rookie in Macau since David Coulthard in the 1991 edition. Lapierre was 5.416 seconds ahead of his teammate Carbone in second and Hiranaka finished third overall. Quintarelli had a quiet race in fourth with Briscoe fifth. Yoshimoto was sixth, Ho seventh, Austin eighth, Fauzy ninth and Barral tenth. The Macanese duo of Lei and Merszei were 11th and 12th. Bonanomi, Piquet, Kataoka and Doornbos were the final overall classified finishers after Lapierre lapped them. Nine of the 29 drivers finished all 25 laps.

=== Race classification ===
Final race classification
Pos	No.	Driver	Team	Laps	Time/Retired	Grid
1	17	(France) Nicolas Lapierre	Signature Team	25	—	4
2	16	(Brazil) Fábio Carbone	Signature Team	25	+5.416	1
3	2	(Japan) Katsuyuki Hiranaka	Prema Powerteam	25	+15.382	23
4	21	(Italy) Ronnie Quintarelli	JB Motorsport with Inging	25	+16.611	20
5	1	(Australia) Ryan Briscoe	Prema Powerteam	25	+27.649	2
6	32	(Japan) Hiroki Yoshimoto	Swiss Racing Team	25	+51.813	19
7	38	(Macau) Michael Ho	TME Racing	25	+1.49.249	26
8	19	(United Kingdom) Rob Austin	Menu Motorsport	25	+2.05.596	25
9	36	(Malaysia) Fairuz Fauzy	Promatecme	25	+2.11.751	11
10	31	(Spain) Pedro Barral	Swiss Racing Team	24	+1 Lap	22
11	28	(Macau) Lei Kit Meng	Manor Motorsport	24	+1 Lap	29
12	29	(Macau) Jo Merszei	Alan Docking Racing	24	+1 Lap	30
13	26	(Italy) Marco Bonanomi	Target Racing	23	+2 Laps	28
14	12	(Brazil) Nelson Piquet Jr.	Hitech Racing	22	+3 Laps	13
15	10	(Japan) Tatsuya Kataoka	TOM'S	22	+3 Laps	8
16	20	(Netherlands) Robert Doornbos	Menu Motorsport	22	+3 Laps	10
Ret	9	(Australia) James Courtney	TOM'S	20	Accident in leg two	3
Ret	18	(Portugal) César Campaniço	Signature Team	18	Accident in leg two	15
Ret	30	(United Kingdom) Danny Watts	Alan Docking Racing	16	Accident damage	16
Ret	37	(Germany) Pierre Kaffer	TME Racing	15	Accident in leg one	5
Ret	23	(Italy) Paolo Montin	ThreeBond Racing	15	Accident in leg one	9
Ret	22	(Japan) Naoki Yokomizo	JB Motorsport with Inging	15	Retired	27
Ret	33	(Venezuela) E. J. Viso	Promatecme	13	Accident damage	24
Ret	27	(United Kingdom) Lewis Hamilton	Manor Motorsport	13	Puncture in leg two	18
Ret	11	(United States) Richard Antinucci	Hitech Racing	10	Accident in leg two	6
Ret	25	(Poland) Robert Kubica	Target Racing	10	Accident in leg two	14
Ret	15	(United Kingdom) Andrew Thompson	Hitech Racing	10	Accident in leg two	21
Ret	6	(Germany) Nico Rosberg	Carlin Motorsport	6	Not classified	7
Ret	5	(Portugal) Álvaro Parente	Carlin Motorsport	6	Accident/Oil leak	11
WD	4	(India) Narain Karthikeyan	Carlin Motorsport	0	Illness	17
Fastest lap: James Courtney, 2:12.937, 165.73 km/h (102.98 mph) on lap 10
