= Paolo Montin =

Italian racing driver (born 1976)

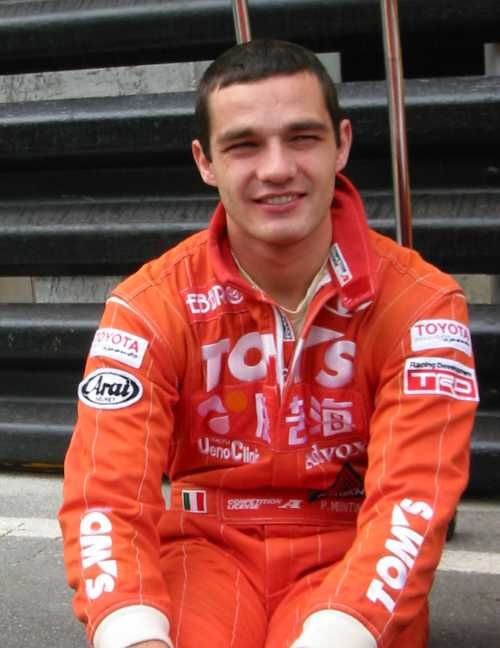
- Montin in 2002
- Nationality: (Italy) Italian
- Born: November 18, 1976 (age 49) Asolo, Veneto, Italy

Porsche Carrera Cup Italy
- Categorisation: FIA Gold
- Years active: 2008
- Teams: Bonaldi Motorsport
- Starts: 13
- Wins: 1
- Poles: 0
- Fastest laps: 1
- Best finish: 6th in 2008

Previous series
- 2005 1998-2004 2001-2003 1999: Super GT - GT300; Formula 3 (various); Super GT - GT500; Italian Formula 3000

Paolo Montin (born 8 November 1976) is an Italian racecar driver.

== Career ==
Montin finished second in the Italian Formula 3 championship in 1998 driving for Team Ghinzani with one win and 113 points. He raced for the team at the Macau GP in the same season, finishing tenth. In 1999, he switched to Italian F3000, driving for Durango, across seven races securing one podium finish. He also raced at the prestigious Macau GP and Korean Super Prix Formula 3 races for Carlin. Montin would finish second in the 2000 Macau GP driving for Target Racing.

In 2001, Montin went to Japan and joined the TOM's racing team. He competed in the Japanese Formula 3 Championship, finishing second with 201 points. The season included three wins, 16 podium finishes, two pole positions and six fastest laps. He also completed his first Super GT race in the TOM's Toyota Supra, finishing fifth at Twin Ring Motegi. For 2002, Montin continued driving for TOM's, finishing second again in the Japanese Formula 3 Championship, this time with 269 points, seven wins, eight pole positions and nine fastest laps. He also qualified on pole position for the 2002 Macau GP. Alongside his efforts in Formula 3, Montin also raced for the team in Super GT, once again in the Supra. He secured two podiums and finished 18th in the championship.

In 2003, Montin moved on from TOM's and joined Three Bond Racing for his third Japanese Formula 3 Championship. He finished in fourth position, securing three wins in the season. In addition, he raced at the Macau GP and Korea Super Prix. He returned to Super GT for one race, driving the Dome Project Honda NSX. After racing once in 2004, in 2005, he returned to Three Bond Racing in Japanese Formula 3. He picked up one victory and finished in fifth place overall. Alongside this, he completed two unsuccessful races for Ombra Racing in Formula 3 Euroseries. Montin made a return to Super GT, this time with Jim Gainer in GT300. Driving the Ferrari 360 Modena, he won one race, secured two podiums and finished fourth in the championship.

Montin did not race competitively again until 2008, when he completed a season in the Porsche Carrera Cup Italy. Driving the single make series Porsche 997 Cup, he finished sixth in the championship for Bonaldi Motorsport, winning one race at Vallelunga, where he also secured a further podium finish.

== Racing Record ==
=== Career summary ===
Season	Series	Team	Races	Wins	Poles	F/Laps	Podiums	Points	Position
1998	British Formula 3 Championship	Team Ghinzani	1	0	0	0	0	0	NC
1998	Italian Formula 3 Championship	Team Ghinzani	10	1	0	3	5	113	2nd
1998	Macau Grand Prix	Team Ghinzani	1					0	10th
1998	Masters of Formula 3	Team Ghinzani	1					0	4th
1999	Korea Super Prix	Carlin Motorsport	1	0	0	0	0	0	Ret
1999	Macau Grand Prix	Carlin Motorsport	1	0	0	0	0	0	Ret
1999	Italian Formula 3000 Championship	Durango	7	0	0	0	1	9	9th
2000	Korea Super Prix	Target Racing	1	0	0	0	0	0	16th
2000	Macau Grand Prix	Target Racing	1	0	0	0	1	0	2nd
2000	FIA European Formula 3 Cup	Target Racing	1	0	0	0	0	0	9th
2000	Italian Formula 3 Championship	Monaco Motorsport Junior Team	1	0	0	0	1	0	NC
2001	Korea Super Prix	TOM's	1	0	0	0	0	0	6th
2001	Macau Grand Prix	TOM's	1	0	0	0	0	0	11th
2001	All-Japan GT Championship	TOM's	1	0	0	0	0	8	31st
2001	Japanese Formula 3 Championship	TOM's	19	3	2	6	16	201	2nd
2001	Masters of Formula 3	RC Motorsport	1	0	0	0	0	0	Ret
2002	Korea Super Prix	TOM's	1	0	0	0	0	0	5th
2002	Macau Grand Prix	TOM's	1	0	1	0	0	0	Ret
2002	All-Japan GT Championship	TOM's	7	0	0	0	2	38	18th
2002	Japanese Formula 3 Championship	TOM's	20	7	8	9	16	269	2nd
2003	Korea Super Prix	Three Bond Racing	1	0	0	0	0	0	20th
2003	Macau Grand Prix	Three Bond Racing	1	0	1	0	0	0	6th
2003	Japanese Formula 3 Championship	Three Bond Racing	20	4	4	2	10	209	2nd
2003	All-Japan GT Championship	DOME	1	0	0	0	0	0	NC
2004	Masters of Formula 3	Ombra	1	0	0	0	0	0	Ret
2005	Macau Grand Prix	Ombra	1	0	1	0	0	0	8th
2005	Formula 3 Euro Series	Ombra	2	0	0	0	0	0	NC
2005	Japanese Formula 3 Championship	Three Bond Racing	12	1	0	0	4	174	5th
2005	All-Japan GT Championship	Jim Gainer	8	1	0	?	2	66	4th
2008	Porsche Carrera Cup Italy	Bonaldi Motorsport	13	1	0	1	3	91	6th
2008	GT3 Cup Coppa Paul Frère	Bonaldi Motorsport	1	0	0	0	0	0	NC

=== Complete JGTC/Super GT Results ===
Year	Team	Car	Class	1	2	3	4	5	6	7	8	DC	Pts
2001	TOYOTA TEAM TOM'S	Toyota Supra	GT500	TAI	FUJ	SUG	FUJ	MOT; 5	SUZ	MIN		20th	8
2002	TOYOTA TEAM TOM'S	Toyota Supra	GT500	TAI; Ret	FUJ; 12	SUG; 5	SEP; 3	FUJ; 3	MOT; 7	MIN; Ret	SUZ	12th	38
2003	Dome Racing Team	Honda NSX	GT500	TAI	FUJ	SUG	FUJ	FUJ	MOT	AUT; Ret	SUZ	NC	0
2005	Jim Gainer	Ferrari 360 Modena	GT300	OKA; 6	FUJ; 4	SEP; 4	SUG; Ret	MOT; 9	FUJ; 2	AUT; 5	SUZ; 1	4th	66
