= 2003 Japanese Formula 3 Championship =

Seasons
- ← 2002 2004 →

The 2003 Japanese Formula 3 Championship was the 25th edition of the Japanese Formula 3 Championship. It began on 22 March at Suzuka and ended on 19 October at Motegi. Australian driver James Courtney took the championship title, winning 13 from 20 races.

== Teams and drivers ==
- All teams were Japanese-registered. All cars were powered by Bridgestone tyres.

Team	No	Driver	Chassis	Engine	Rounds
Dome Racing Team	1	(Japan) Shinya Hosokawa	Lola-Dome F106	Mugen-Honda MF204C	1–5
Dome Racing Team	1	(Japan) Koji Yamanishi	Lola-Dome F106	Mugen-Honda MF204C	7–10
Dome Racing Team	10	(United Kingdom) Rob Austin	Lola-Dome F106	Mugen-Honda MF204B	9–10
Dome Racing Team	11	(Japan) Yuki Shibata	Lola-Dome F106	Mugen-Honda MF204B	1–7
Toda Racing	2	(Japan) Shinya Sato	Dallara F302	Toda-Honda MF204B	All
Inging	3	(Japan) Naoki Yokomizo	Dallara F303	Torii-Toyota 3S-GE	All
Inging	4	(Italy) Ronnie Quintarelli	Dallara F302	Torii-Toyota 3S-GE	All
TOM'S	7	(Australia) James Courtney	Dallara F302	Toyota-TOM'S 3S-GE	All
TOM'S	8	(Japan) Wataru Kobayakawa	Dallara F302	Toyota-TOM'S 3S-GE	All
TOM'S	36	(Japan) Tatsuya Kataoka	Dallara F302	Toyota-TOM'S 3S-GE	All
ThreeBond Racing	12	(Italy) Paolo Montin	Dallara F303	Tomei Nissan SR20VE	All
ThreeBond Racing	14	(Japan) Masataka Yanagida	Dallara F302	Tomei Nissan SR20VE	2
Aim Sports	18	(Japan) Takahiro Ogawa	Dallara F302	Torii-Toyota 3S-GE	1–5
Aim Sports	18	(Japan) Atsushi Katsumata	Dallara F302	Torii-Toyota 3S-GE	8
DTM	19	(Japan) Hiroyoshi Shibata	Dallara F302	Toyota-TOM'S 3S-GE	All
Now Motor Sports	32	(Japan) Taku Bamba	Lola-Dome F106	Toyota-TOM'S 3S-GE	All
Now Motor Sports	33	(Japan) Hiroki Yoshimoto	Lola-Dome F106	Toyota-TOM'S 3S-GE	All

== Race calendar and results ==
Round		Circuit	Date	Pole position	Fastest lap	Winning driver	Winning team
1	R1	Suzuka Circuit, Suzuka	22 March	(Italy) Paolo Montin	(Australia) James Courtney	(Australia) James Courtney	TOM'S
1	R2	Suzuka Circuit, Suzuka	23 March	(Australia) James Courtney	(Japan) Yuki Shibata	(Japan) Yuki Shibata	Dome Racing Team
2	R1	Fuji Speedway, Oyama	5 April	(Australia) James Courtney	(Australia) James Courtney	(Australia) James Courtney	TOM'S
2	R2	Fuji Speedway, Oyama	6 April	(Australia) James Courtney	(Japan) Tatsuya Kataoka	(Australia) James Courtney	TOM'S
3	R1	Okayama International Circuit	17 May	(Australia) James Courtney	(Australia) James Courtney	(Australia) James Courtney	TOM'S
3	R2	Okayama International Circuit	18 May	(Australia) James Courtney	(Australia) James Courtney	(Australia) James Courtney	TOM'S
4	R1	Twin Ring Motegi, Motegi	7 June	(Italy) Paolo Montin	(Italy) Paolo Montin	(Italy) Paolo Montin	ThreeBond Racing
4	R2	Twin Ring Motegi, Motegi	8 June	(Italy) Paolo Montin	(Italy) Paolo Montin	(Italy) Paolo Montin	ThreeBond Racing
5	R1	Suzuka Circuit, Suzuka	5 July	(Australia) James Courtney	(Japan) Shinya Hosokawa	(Japan) Shinya Hosokawa	Dome Racing Team
5	R2	Suzuka Circuit, Suzuka	6 July	(Italy) Paolo Montin	(Australia) James Courtney	(Italy) Paolo Montin	ThreeBond Racing
6	R1	Sportsland SUGO, Murata	26 July	(Australia) James Courtney	(Australia) James Courtney	(Australia) James Courtney	TOM'S
6	R2	Sportsland SUGO, Murata	27 July	(Australia) James Courtney (Note: The qualifying session were abandoned due to heavy rain. The grid of the second race was equal to the first race.)	(Australia) James Courtney	(Australia) James Courtney	TOM'S
7	R1	Tsukuba Circuit, Shimotsuma	9 August	(Japan) Tatsuya Kataoka	(Japan) Koji Yamanishi	(Japan) Koji Yamanishi	Dome Racing Team
7	R2	Tsukuba Circuit, Shimotsuma	10 August	(Japan) Tatsuya Kataoka	(Japan) Tatsuya Kataoka	(Japan) Tatsuya Kataoka	Dome Racing Team
8	R1	Sportsland SUGO, Murata	6 September	(Australia) James Courtney	(Australia) James Courtney	(Australia) James Courtney	TOM'S
8	R2	Sportsland SUGO, Murata	7 September	(Australia) James Courtney	(Australia) James Courtney	(Australia) James Courtney	TOM'S
9	R1	Mine Circuit, Mine	20 September	(Japan) Tatsuya Kataoka	(Australia) James Courtney	(Australia) James Courtney	TOM'S
9	R2	Mine Circuit, Mine	21 September	(Australia) James Courtney	(Australia) James Courtney	(Australia) James Courtney	TOM'S
10	R1	Twin Ring Motegi, Motegi	18 October	(Australia) James Courtney	(Australia) James Courtney	(Australia) James Courtney	TOM'S
10	R2	Twin Ring Motegi, Motegi	19 October	(Australia) James Courtney	(Australia) James Courtney	(Australia) James Courtney	TOM'S

== Standings ==
- Points are awarded as follows, with only the best 16 results to count:

1	2	3	4	5	6	7	8	9	10
20	15	12	10	8	6	4	3	2	1

Pos	Driver	SUZ		FUJ		OKA		MOT		SUZ		SUG		TSU		SUG		MIN		MOT		Pts
1	(Australia) James Courtney	**1**	**8**	**1**	**1**	**1**	**1**	2	2	**5**	2	**1**	**1**	5	3	**1**	**1**	1	**1**	**1**	**1**	305
2	(Italy) Paolo Montin	5	2	4	4	5	12	**1**	**1**	2	**1**	Ret	4	3	4	2	Ret	3	3	6	3	209
3	(Japan) Tatsuya Kataoka	11	Ret	2	2	2	2	3	4	4	4	4	3	**2**	**1**	5	2	**2**	4	5	5	207
4	(Italy) Ronnie Quintarelli	3	3	3	5	3	3	5	6	6	6	2	2	4	2	4	3	4	2	2	2	200
5	(Japan) Naoki Yokomizo	2	7	8	6	4	6	6	5	Ret	9	Ret	8	6	8	3	Ret	8	6	3	6	109
6	(Japan) Shinya Hosokawa	8	9	6	3	Ret	4	4	3	1	3											87
7	(Japan) Shinya Sato	4	Ret	10	7	9	8	9	7	3	7	6	5	7	6	8	NC	6	8	9	9	79
8	(Japan) Yuki Shibata	6	1	5	Ret	Ret	DNS	8	12	10	5	7	Ret	9	7							56
9	(Japan) Koji Yamanishi													1	5	7	Ret	DNS	Ret	4	4	52
10	(Japan) Hiroki Yoshimoto	Ret	DNS	11	Ret	6	9	7	8	8	12	8	6	12	9	Ret	8	5	7	7	7	52
11	(Japan) Wataru Kobayakawa	7	4	9	10	Ret	5	11	11	Ret	Ret	Ret	7	8	12	6	6	7	9	Ret	10	51
12	(Japan) Hiroyoshi Shibata	10	6	7	8	7	7	13	9	7	11	5	Ret	11	11	10	4	9	10	10	12	51
13	(Japan) Taku Bamba	9	5	12	11	DNS	10	10	Ret	11	8	3	Ret	10	10	9	5	Ret	Ret	8	11	42
14	(United Kingdom) Rob Austin																	10	5	Ret	8	12
15	(Japan) Takahiro Ogawa	12	Ret	14	Ret	8	11	12	10	9	10											7
16	(Japan) Atsushi Katsumata															11	7					4
17	(Japan) Masataka Yanagida			13	9																	2
Pos	Driver	SUZ		FUJ		OKA		MOT		SUZ		SUG		TSU		SUG		MIN		MOT		Pts

Colour	Result
Gold	Winner
Silver	Second place
Bronze	Third place
Green	Points classification
Blue	Non-points classification
Blue	Non-classified finish (NC)
Purple	Retired, not classified (Ret)
Red	Did not qualify (DNQ)
Red	Did not pre-qualify (DNPQ)
Black	Disqualified (DSQ)
White	Did not start (DNS)
White	Withdrew (WD)
White	Race cancelled (C)
Blank	Did not practice (DNP)
Blank	Did not arrive (DNA)
Blank	Excluded (EX)

**Bold** – Pole
Italics – Fastest Lap
