= 2001 Japanese Formula 3 Championship =

Seasons
- ← 2000 2002 →

The 2001 Japanese Formula 3 Championship was the 23rd edition of the Japanese Formula 3 Championship. It began on 25 March at Suzuka and ended on 21 October at Motegi. French driver Benoît Tréluyer took the championship title by winning 15 of 19 races.

== Teams and drivers ==
- All teams were Japanese-registered. All cars were powered by Bridgestone tires.

Team	No	Driver	Chassis	Engine	Rounds
TOM'S	0	(Italy) Paolo Montin	Dallara F301	Toyota-TOM'S 3S-GE	All
TOM'S	7	(Japan) Sakon Yamamoto	Dallara F301	Toyota-TOM'S 3S-GE	All
TOM'S	8	(Japan) Norihiko Tasaki	Dallara F301	Toyota-TOM'S 3S-GE	All
Mugen Dome Project	1	(France) Benoît Tréluyer	Dallara F300/301	Mugen-Honda MF204B	All
Mugen Dome Project	11	(Japan) Shinya Hosokawa	Dallara F300	Mugen-Honda MF204B	10
Toda Racing	2	(Japan) Masataka Yanagida	Dallara F399/301	Toda-Honda MF204B	All
Inging	3	(France) Jérémie Dufour	Dallara F300	Torii-Toyota 3S-GE	All
Inging	4	(France) Bruce Jouanny	Dallara F399	Torii-Toyota 3S-GE	10
XO Racing	4	(Japan) Keiichi Nisimiya	XOR-99F	Torii-Toyota 3S-GE	2–3, 5
Team 5Zigen	5	(Japan) Hideshi Nishimura	Dallara F300	Torii-Toyota 3S-GE	1–5, 7, 9
Team 5Zigen	6	(Japan) Takahiro Ogawa	Dallara F300	Torii-Toyota 3S-GE	1–6, 9–10
Pal Sport	9	(Japan) Akitsugu Matsunaga	Dallara F300	Torii-Toyota 3S-GE	1–5
ThreeBond Racing	12	(Japan) Yuji Ide	Dallara F399/301	Tomei Nissan SR20VE	All
Team Daikokuya	16	(Japan) Yousuke Shimojima	Dallara F300	Toyota-TOM'S 3S-GE	10
Aim Sports	16	(Japan) Hiroki Yoshimoto	Dallara F300	Torii-Toyota 3S-GE	9
Aim Sports	18	(Japan) Shogo Mitsuyama	Dallara F399	Torii-Toyota 3S-GE	All
Lian Racing	17	(Sweden) Peter Sundberg	Dallara F399	Toda-Honda MF204B	All
DTM	19	(Japan) Keita Sawa	Dallara F399	Toyota-TOM'S 3S-GE	1–3, 7, 9–10
DTM	20	(Ukraine) Vladimir Tchekanine	Dallara F399	Toyota-TOM'S 3S-GE	6
Team Echigoya	21	(Japan) Shigeki Ebihara	Dallara F399	Toyota-TOM'S 3S-GE	1–2
Kondō Racing	24	(Japan) Kazuyuki Nishizawa	Dallara F399	Toyota-TOM'S 3S-GE	1–2, 4–5, 9
Maejima	32	(Japan) Saturo Gotou	Dallara F399	Torii-Toyota 3S-GE	2
Maejima	32	(Japan) Shigeki Ebihara	Dallara F399	Toyota-TOM'S	5–10
Now Motor Sports	33	(Japan) Takashi Kogure	Dallara F399	Toyota-TOM'S 3S-GE	All
Nobel France Racing Team	37	(Japan) Motonari Higuchi	Dallara F399	Torii-Toyota 3S-GE	1–2, 5
Nakajima Racing	64	(Japan) Shinya Sato	Dallara F399	Mugen-Honda MF204B	All
Skill Speed	77	(Japan) Hiroshi Nakamura	Dallara F399	Toda-Honda MF204B	2–10

== Race calendar and results ==
Round		Circuit	Date	Pole position	Fastest lap	Winning driver	Winning team
1	R1	Suzuka Circuit, Suzuka	25 March	(France) Jérémie Dufour	(Italy) Paolo Montin	(France) Benoît Tréluyer	Mugen Dome Project
1	R2	Suzuka Circuit, Suzuka	25 March	(Italy) Paolo Montin	(France) Benoît Tréluyer	(Italy) Paolo Montin	TOM'S
2	R1	Tsukuba Circuit, Shimotsuma	8 April	(France) Benoît Tréluyer	(France) Benoît Tréluyer	(France) Benoît Tréluyer	Mugen Dome Project
2	R2	Tsukuba Circuit, Shimotsuma	8 April	(France) Benoît Tréluyer	(France) Benoît Tréluyer	(France) Benoît Tréluyer	Mugen Dome Project
3	R1	Fuji Speedway, Oyama	4 May	(France) Benoît Tréluyer	(France) Benoît Tréluyer	(France) Jérémie Dufour	TOM'S
3	R2	Fuji Speedway, Oyama	4 May	(France) Jérémie Dufour	(Italy) Paolo Montin	(Italy) Paolo Montin	TOM'S
4	R1	Mine Circuit, Mine	20 May	(France) Benoît Tréluyer	(France) Benoît Tréluyer	(France) Benoît Tréluyer	Mugen Dome Project
4	R2	Mine Circuit, Mine	20 May	(France) Benoît Tréluyer	(France) Benoît Tréluyer	(France) Benoît Tréluyer	Mugen Dome Project
5	R1	Twin Ring Motegi, Motegi	10 June	(France) Benoît Tréluyer	(Italy) Paolo Montin	(France) Benoît Tréluyer	Mugen Dome Project
5	R2	Twin Ring Motegi, Motegi	10 June	(France) Benoît Tréluyer	(Italy) Paolo Montin	(France) Benoît Tréluyer	Mugen Dome Project
6		Suzuka Circuit, Suzuka	1 July	(Italy) Paolo Montin	(Italy) Paolo Montin	(Italy) Paolo Montin	TOM'S
7	R1	Sportsland SUGO, Murata	29 July	(France) Benoît Tréluyer	(France) Benoît Tréluyer	(France) Benoît Tréluyer	Mugen Dome Project
7	R2	Sportsland SUGO, Murata	29 July	(France) Benoît Tréluyer	(France) Benoît Tréluyer	(France) Benoît Tréluyer	Mugen Dome Project
8	R1	Sendai Hi-Land Raceway, Aoba-ku	26 August	(France) Benoît Tréluyer	(France) Benoît Tréluyer	(France) Benoît Tréluyer	Mugen Dome Project
8	R2	Sendai Hi-Land Raceway, Aoba-ku	26 August	(France) Benoît Tréluyer	(France) Benoît Tréluyer	(France) Benoît Tréluyer	Mugen Dome Project
9	R1	Okayama International Circuit	9 September	(France) Benoît Tréluyer	(France) Benoît Tréluyer	(France) Benoît Tréluyer	Mugen Dome Project
9	R2	Okayama International Circuit	9 September	(France) Benoît Tréluyer	(France) Benoît Tréluyer	(France) Benoît Tréluyer	Mugen Dome Project
10	R1	Twin Ring Motegi, Motegi	21 October	(France) Jérémie Dufour	(France) Benoît Tréluyer	(France) Benoît Tréluyer	Mugen Dome Project
10	R2	Twin Ring Motegi, Motegi	21 October	(France) Benoît Tréluyer	(France) Benoît Tréluyer	(France) Benoît Tréluyer	Mugen Dome Project

== Standings ==
- Points are awarded as follows, with only the best 13 results to count:

1	2	3	4	5	6	7	8	9	10
20	15	12	10	8	6	4	3	2	1

Pos	Driver	SUZ		TSU		FUJ		MIN		MOT		SUZ	SUG		SEN		OKA		MOT		Pts
1	(France) Benoît Tréluyer	1	2	**1**	**1**	**2**	**Ret**	**1**	**1**	**1**	**1**	2	**1**	**1**	**1**	**1**	**1**	**1**	1	**1**	260
2	(Italy) Paolo Montin	3	**1**	6	4	3	1	3	2	2	2	**1**	2	2	2	8	3	3	3	2	201
3	(France) Jérémie Dufour	**2**	3	2	2	1	Ret	2	6	3	3	4	3	4	4	3	Ret	12	**2**	3	177
4	(Japan) Sakon Yamamoto	DNS	9	12	10	10	Ret	Ret	9	5	4	3	Ret	3	3	4	2	2	5	4	117
5	(Japan) Yuji Ide	Ret	4	7	7	5	Ret	4	3	Ret	5	5	5	5	6	6	5	8	8	8	100
6	(Sweden) Peter Sundberg	4	Ret	3	6	4	2	7	Ret	Ret	8	10	Ret	Ret	Ret	2	6	5	7	12	94
7	(Japan) Masataka Yanagida	DNS	8	13	5	14	Ret	6	4	4	6	7	8	9	7	9	7	Ret	4	5	80
8	(Japan) Shinya Sato	9	7	8	3	Ret	Ret	10	8	Ret	7	6	4	8	5	7	4	6	6	Ret	79
9	(Japan) Shogo Mitsuyama	8	Ret	4	Ret	7	3	Ret	Ret	6	9	8	10	6	Ret	Ret	10	7	10	7	57
10	(Japan) Norihiko Tasaki	Ret	5	Ret	Ret	8	4	9	7	12	Ret	Ret	7	7	Ret	11	8	4	Ret	6	54
11	(Japan) Takashi Kogure	6	Ret	Ret	Ret	9	Ret	5	5	7	Ret	Ret	6	13	9	5	15	Ret	12	11	44
12	(Japan) Keita Sawa	5	6	5	8	6	5						11	Ret			9	Ret	16	Ret	41
13	(Japan) Takahiro Ogawa	10	Ret	10	Ret	11	6	13	Ret	Ret	10	Ret					11	10	13	14	10
14	(Japan) Akitsugu Matsunaga	7	10	14	12	Ret	Ret	12	Ret	9	13										7
15	(Japan) Hideshi Nishimura	11	11	9	13	12	Ret	8	Ret	14	Ret		13	12			16	9			7
16	(Japan) Shigeki Ebihara	12	Ret	Ret	16					11	11	9	12	11	8	12	14	Ret	15	Ret	5
17	(Japan) Hiroshi Nakamura			Ret	15	13	Ret	11	Ret	10	Ret	11	9	10	Ret	10	13	11	14	13	5
18	(Japan) Kazuyuki Nishizawa	13	Ret	Ret	11			Ret	Ret	8	DNS						12	Ret			3
19	(France) Bruce Jouanny																		9	10	3
20	(Japan) Saturo Gotou			11	9																2
21	(Japan) Shinya Hosokawa																		11	9	2
22	(Japan) Motonari Higuchi	Ret	12	Ret	14					13	12										0
23	(Ukraine) Vladimir Tchekanine											12									0
24	(Japan) Keiichi Nisimiya			DNS	DNS	15	Ret			Ret	Ret										0
25	(Japan) Yousuke Shimojima																		17	Ret	0
	(Japan) Hiroki Yoshimoto																Ret	Ret			0
Pos	Driver	SUZ		TSU		FUJ		MIN		MOT		SUZ	SUG		SEN		OKA		MOT		Pts

Colour	Result
Gold	Winner
Silver	Second place
Bronze	Third place
Green	Points classification
Blue	Non-points classification
Blue	Non-classified finish (NC)
Purple	Retired, not classified (Ret)
Red	Did not qualify (DNQ)
Red	Did not pre-qualify (DNPQ)
Black	Disqualified (DSQ)
White	Did not start (DNS)
White	Withdrew (WD)
White	Race cancelled (C)
Blank	Did not practice (DNP)
Blank	Did not arrive (DNA)
Blank	Excluded (EX)

**Bold** – Pole
Italics – Fastest Lap
