= 2002 Japanese Formula 3 Championship =

Seasons
- ← 2001 2003 →

The 2002 Japanese Formula 3 Championship was the 24th edition of the Japanese Formula 3 Championship. It began on 2 March at Tsukuba and ended on 20 October at Motegi. Local driver Takashi Kogure took the championship title, winning 11 from 20 races.

== Teams and drivers ==
- All teams were Japanese-registered. All cars were powered by Bridgestone tyres.

Team	No	Driver	Chassis	Engine	Rounds
Dome Racing Team	1	(Japan) Takashi Kogure	Dallara F302	Mugen-Honda MF204B	All
Dome Racing Team	11	(Japan) Kazuki Hoshino	Dallara F302	Mugen-Honda MF204B	All
Toda Racing	2	(Japan) Hirokazu Nagaya	Dallara F302	Toda-Honda MF204B	1–9
Inging	3	(France) Mathieu Zangarelli	Dallara F302	Torii-Toyota 3S-GE	All
Team 5Zigen	5	(Japan) Hideshi Nishimura	Dallara F302	Torii-Toyota 3S-GE	All
TOM'S	7	(Italy) Paolo Montin	Dallara F302	Toyota-TOM'S 3S-GE	All
TOM'S	8	(Japan) Naoki Yokomizo	Dallara F302	Toyota-TOM'S 3S-GE	All
TOM'S	36	(Japan) Tatsuya Kataoka	Dallara F302	Toyota-TOM'S 3S-GE	All
TOM'S	37	(Japan) Katsuyuki Hiranaka	Dallara F302	Toyota-TOM'S 3S-GE	All
ThreeBond Racing	12	(Japan) Masaru Tomizawa	Dallara F302	Tomei Nissan SR20VE	All
ThreeBond Racing	14	(Japan) Hideyuki Ishizaki	Dallara F399	Tomei Nissan SR20VE	10
Aim Sports	18	(Japan) Hiroshi Nakamura	Dallara F302	Torii-Toyota 3S-GE	1–6
Aim Sports	18	(Japan) Shogo Mitsuyama	Dallara F302	Torii-Toyota 3S-GE	7
Aim Sports	18	(Japan) Masato Shimoyama	Dallara F302	Torii-Toyota 3S-GE	8
Aim Sports	18	(Japan) Kota Sasaki	Dallara F302	Torii-Toyota 3S-GE	9–10
Now Motor Sports	33	(Japan) Hiroki Yoshimoto	Dallara F302	Toyota-TOM'S 3S-GE	All
DTM	60	(Japan) Keita Sawa	Dallara F300	Toyota-TOM'S 3S-GE	10
Nakajima Racing	64	(Japan) Shinya Sato	Dallara F302	Mugen-Honda MF204B	All

== Race calendar and results ==
Round		Circuit	Date	Pole position	Fastest lap	Winning driver	Winning team
1	R1	Tsukuba Circuit, Shimotsuma	2 March	(Japan) Takashi Kogure	(Italy) Paolo Montin	(Italy) Paolo Montin	TOM'S
1	R2	Tsukuba Circuit, Shimotsuma	3 March	(Japan) Takashi Kogure	(Italy) Paolo Montin	(Italy) Paolo Montin	TOM'S
2	R1	Suzuka Circuit, Suzuka	23 March	(Italy) Paolo Montin	(Japan) Shinya Sato	(Japan) Takashi Kogure	Dome Racing Team
2	R2	Suzuka Circuit, Suzuka	24 March	(Japan) Takashi Kogure	(Japan) Shinya Sato	(Japan) Takashi Kogure	Dome Racing Team
3	R1	Fuji Speedway, Oyama	2 May	(Italy) Paolo Montin	(Italy) Paolo Montin	(Italy) Paolo Montin	TOM'S
3	R2	Fuji Speedway, Oyama	3 May	(Italy) Paolo Montin	(Japan) Katsuyuki Hiranaka	(Japan) Tatsuya Kataoka	TOM'S
4	R1	Mine Circuit, Mine	18 May	(Italy) Paolo Montin	(Italy) Paolo Montin	(Italy) Paolo Montin	TOM'S
4	R2	Mine Circuit, Mine	19 May	(Japan) Takashi Kogure	(Japan) Takashi Kogure	(Japan) Takashi Kogure	Dome Racing Team
5	R1	Twin Ring Motegi, Motegi	8 June	(Japan) Takashi Kogure	(Japan) Takashi Kogure	(Japan) Takashi Kogure	Dome Racing Team
5	R2	Twin Ring Motegi, Motegi	9 June	(Italy) Paolo Montin	(Japan) Takashi Kogure	(Japan) Takashi Kogure	Dome Racing Team
6	R1	Suzuka Circuit, Suzuka	6 July	(Japan) Takashi Kogure	(Italy) Paolo Montin	(Japan) Takashi Kogure	Dome Racing Team
6	R2	Suzuka Circuit, Suzuka	7 July	(Japan) Shinya Sato	(Italy) Paolo Montin	(Italy) Paolo Montin	TOM'S
7	R1	Sportsland SUGO, Murata	3 August	(Japan) Takashi Kogure	(Japan) Takashi Kogure	(Japan) Takashi Kogure	Dome Racing Team
7	R2	Sportsland SUGO, Murata	4 August	(Japan) Takashi Kogure	(Japan) Takashi Kogure	(Japan) Takashi Kogure	Dome Racing Team
8	R1	Sendai Hi-Land Raceway, Aoba-ku	24 August	(Japan) Takashi Kogure	(Japan) Takashi Kogure	(Japan) Takashi Kogure	Dome Racing Team
8	R2	Sendai Hi-Land Raceway, Aoba-ku	25 August	(Japan) Takashi Kogure	(Japan) Takashi Kogure	(Japan) Takashi Kogure	Dome Racing Team
9	R1	Okayama International Circuit	7 September	(Japan) Hiroki Yoshimoto	(Japan) Hiroki Yoshimoto	(Japan) Hiroki Yoshimoto	Now Motor Sports
9	R2	Okayama International Circuit	8 September	(Italy) Paolo Montin	(Italy) Paolo Montin	(Italy) Paolo Montin	TOM'S
10	R1	Twin Ring Motegi, Motegi	19 October	(Italy) Paolo Montin	(Italy) Paolo Montin	(Japan) Takashi Kogure	Dome Racing Team
10	R2	Twin Ring Motegi, Motegi	20 October	(Italy) Paolo Montin	(Italy) Paolo Montin	(Italy) Paolo Montin	TOM'S

== Standings ==
- Points are awarded as follows, with only the best 16 results to count

1	2	3	4	5	6	7	8	9	10
20	15	12	10	8	6	4	3	2	1

Pos	Driver	TSU		SUZ		FUJ		MIN		MOT		SUZ		SUG		SEN		OKA		MOT		Pts
1	(Japan) Takashi Kogure	**4**	**7**	1	**1**	Ret	Ret	2	**1**	**1**	1	**1**	2	**1**	**1**	**1**	**1**	Ret	2	1	2	294
2	(Italy) Paolo Montin	1	1	**4**	2	**1**	**Ret**	**1**	2	3	9	2	1	2	2	8	3	2	**1**	**2**	**1**	269
3	(France) Mathieu Zangarelli	2	2	12	6	3	2	8	4	2	4	4	11	5	5	7	4	9	Ret	4	6	157
4	(Japan) Shinya Sato	3	Ret	2	9	5	3	3	6	Ret	11	3	**3**	4	4	2	10	10	6	5	5	149
5	(Japan) Katsuyuki Hiranaka	5	5	3	10	2	Ret	Ret	5	4	3	9	7	3	DNS	Ret	2	4	3	13	3	142
6	(Japan) Tatsuya Kataoka	Ret	3	5	3	Ret	1	5	3	7	8	7	9	7	10	4	9	7	7	6	4	125
7	(Japan) Naoki Yokomizo	10	10	6	4	7	4	4	8	9	5	12	10	10	3	6	5	6	4	3	9	110
8	(Japan) Hiroki Yoshimoto	8	6	7	5	Ret	6	Ret	7	8	10	8	6	9	Ret	3	6	**1**	Ret	11	11	85
9	(Japan) Hirokazu Nagaya	6	Ret	8	Ret	6	5	Ret	10	6	7	5	8	8	6	5	12	5	5			78
10	(Japan) Masaru Tomizawa	9	4	10	Ret	4	9	Ret	9	5	6	10	4	11	7	Ret	8	8	11	12	7	69
11	(Japan) Kazuki Hoshino	Ret	8	Ret	Ret	Ret	7	9	Ret	Ret	2	6	5	12	8	11	7	3	8	7	Ret	64
12	(Japan) Hideshi Nishimura	7	9	11	7	8	10	7	11	10	12	11	12	13	9	9	11	12	10	14	13	24
13	(Japan) Hiroshi Nakamura	Ret	Ret	9	8	Ret	8	6	12	11	13	Ret	13									14
14	(Japan) Kota Sasaki																	11	9	8	8	8
15	(Japan) Shogo Mitsuyama													6	11							4
16	(Japan) Masato Shimoyama															10	13					1
Guest driver ineligible for points
	(Japan) Keita Sawa																			9	10	0
	(Japan) Hideyuki Ishizaki																			10	13	0
Pos	Driver	TSU		SUZ		FUJ		MIN		MOT		SUZ		SUG		SEN		OKA		MOT		Pts

Colour	Result
Gold	Winner
Silver	Second place
Bronze	Third place
Green	Points classification
Blue	Non-points classification
Blue	Non-classified finish (NC)
Purple	Retired, not classified (Ret)
Red	Did not qualify (DNQ)
Red	Did not pre-qualify (DNPQ)
Black	Disqualified (DSQ)
White	Did not start (DNS)
White	Withdrew (WD)
White	Race cancelled (C)
Blank	Did not practice (DNP)
Blank	Did not arrive (DNA)
Blank	Excluded (EX)

**Bold** – Pole
Italics – Fastest Lap
