= Tatsuya Kataoka =

Japanese racing driver

Tatsuya Kataoka 片岡龍也
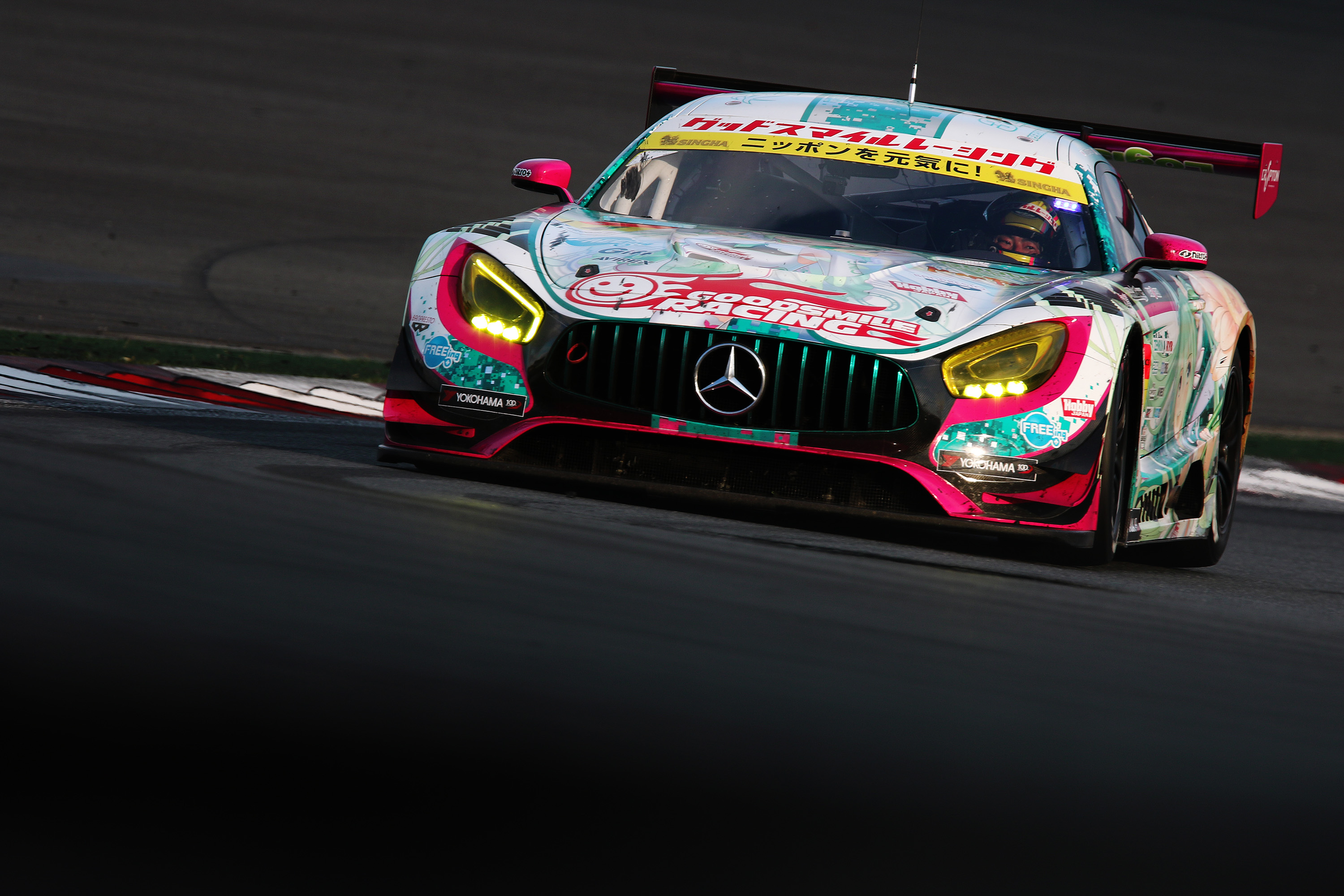
- Kataoka driving the Goodsmile Racing with Team UKYO AMG at the 3rd round of the 2017 Super GT Series at Fuji Speedway
- Nationality: Japan
- Born: 1 May 1979 (age 47) Aichi

Super GT career
- Debut season: 2003
- Current team: Goodsmile Racing with Team UKYO
- Categorisation: FIA Gold
- Car number: 4
- Former teams: Sigmatech Racing, Toyota Team TOM'S, Team LeMans, Racing Project Bandoh
- Championships: 2009, 2014, 2017
- Wins: 10

Previous series
- 2004–2007: Formula Nippon

Tatsuya Kataoka (片岡龍也, Kataoka Tatsuya; born May 1, 1979 in Aichi) is a Japanese racing driver. He currently competes in the Super GT series for Goodsmile Racing with Team UKYO, where he is a three-time champion in the GT300 class.

== Racing record ==
=== Complete Japanese Formula 3 results ===
(key) (Races in bold indicate pole position) (Races in italics indicate fastest lap)

Year	Team	Engine	1	2	3	4	5	6	7	8	9	10	11	12	13	14	15	16	17	18	19	20	DC	Pts
2002	TOM'S	Toyota	TSU; 1 Ret	TSU; 2; 3	SUZ; 1; 5	SUZ; 2; 3	FUJ; 1 Ret	FUJ; 2; 1	MIN; 1; 5	MIN; 2; 3	MOT; 1; 7	MOT; 2; 8	SUZ; 1; 7	SUZ; 2; 9	SUG; 1; 7	SUG; 2; 10	SEN; 1; 4	SEN; 2; 9	TAI; 1; 7	TAI; 2; 7	MOT; 1; 6	MOT; 2; 4	6th	125
2003	TOM'S	Toyota	SUZ; 1; 11	SUZ; 2 Ret	FUJ; 1; 2	FUJ; 2; 2	TAI; 1; 2	TAI; 2; 2	MOT; 1; 3	MOT; 2; 4	SUZ; 1; 4	SUZ; 2; 4	SUG; 1; 4	SUG; 2; 3	**TSU**; **1**; 2	**TSU**; **2**; 1	SUG; 1; 5	SUG; 2; 2	**MIN**; **1**; 2	MIN; 2; 4	MOT; 1; 5	MOT; 2; 5	**3rd**	**207**

=== Complete Formula Nippon results ===
(key) (Races in bold indicate pole position) (Races in italics indicate fastest lap)

Year	Team	1	2	3	4	5	6	7	8	9	DC	Pts
2004	LeMans Spirit	SUZ; 10	SUG; 11	MOT; 3	SUZ; 13	SUG; Ret	MIN; 4	SEP; 5	MOT; 4	SUZ; 12	8th	12
2005	Forum Engineering Team LeMans	MOT; 7	SUZ; 8	SUG; 8	FUJ; Ret	SUZ; Ret	MIN; 7	FUJ; 2	MOT; 6	SUZ; 7	11th	7
2006	Team LeMans	FUJ; 13	SUZ; 7	MOT; Ret	SUZ; 6	AUT; 3	FUJ; Ret	SUG; 9	MOT; 3	SUZ; 3	7th	13
2007	Forum Engineering Team LeMans	FUJ; 7	SUZ; Ret	MOT; Ret	OKA; 9	SUZ; Ret	FUJ; Ret	SUG; Ret	MOT; 10	SUZ; 7	14th	4

=== Complete JGTC/Super GT Results ===
(key) (Races in bold indicate pole position) (Races in italics indicate fastest lap)

Year	Team	Car	Class	1	2	3	4	5	6	7	8	9	DC	Pts
2003	Sigmatech Racing	Toyota Celica	GT300	TAI	FSW	SUG	FSW	FSW	TRM; 1	AUT; 1	SUZ		9th	44
2004	Toyota Team TOM'S	Toyota Supra	GT500	TAI; 11	SUG; 3	SEP; 5	TOK; 5	TRM; 4	AUT; 6	SUZ; 6			6th	44
2005	Toyota Team TOM'S	Toyota Supra	GT500	OKA; 6	FSW; 6	SEP; 13	SUG; 1	TRM; 8	FSW; 7	AUT; Ret	SUZ; 7		7th	43
2006	Mobil 1 Toyota Team LeMans	Lexus SC430	GT500	SUZ; 6	OKA; 11	FSW; 2	SEP; 14	SUG; 9	SUZ; Ret	TRM; 4	AUT; 13	FSW; 5	12th	41
2007	Forum Eng Toyota Team LeMans	Lexus SC430	GT500	SUZ; 4	OKA; 14	FSW; 3	SEP; 9	SUG; DNS	SUZ; 9	TRM; 3	AUT; 8	FSW; 16	9th	38
2008	Toyota Team Kraft	Lexus SC430	GT500	SUZ; 6	OKA; 6	FSW; 5	SEP; 10	SUG; 2	SUZ; 10	TRM; 6	AUT; 15	FSW; 6	9th	45
2009	Racing Project Bandoh	Lexus IS350	GT300	OKA; 1	SUZ; 8	FSW; 5	SEP; 2	SUG; 5	SUZ; 6	FSW; 4	AUT; 3	TRM; 3	**1st**	**85**
2010	Racing Project Bandoh	Lexus IS350	GT300	SUZ; 3	OKA; 14	FSW; 4	SEP; 9	SUG; Ret	SUZ; 4	FSW; C	TRM; 7		8th	33
2011	Lexus Team WedsSport Bandoh	Lexus SC430	GT500	OKA; 15	FSW; 3	SEP; 11	SUG; 8	SUZ; 11	FSW; 13	AUT; 7	TRM; 11		13th	18
2012	GSR&Studie with TeamUKYO	BMW Z4 GT3	GT300	OKA; 3	FSW; 1	SEP; 12	SUG; 7	SUZ; Ret	FSW; 8	AUT; 5	TRM; 4		5th	52
2013	GSR&Studie with TeamUKYO	BMW Z4 GT3	GT300	OKA; 2	FSW; 9	SEP; 6	SUG; 15	SUZ; DSQ	FSW; 1	FSW	AUT; 1	TRM; 4	**3rd**	**70**
2014	Good Smile Racing & TeamUKYO	BMW Z4 GT3	GT300	OKA; 1	FSW; 1	AUT; 16	SUG; 15	FSW; 4	SUZ; 5	CHA; 3	TRM; 3		**1st**	**78**
2015	Good Smile Racing & TeamUKYO	Mercedes-Benz SLS AMG GT3	GT300	OKA; 5	FSW; 5	CHA; 13	FSW; 18	SUZ; 8	SUG; 16	AUT; 7	TRM; 2		12th	35
2016	Good Smile Racing & TeamUKYO	Mercedes AMG GT3	GT300	OKA; 2	FSW; 18	SUG; 7	FSW; 5	SUZ; 5	CHA; 8	TRM; 18	TRM; 3		7th	47
2017	Good Smile Racing & TeamUKYO	Mercedes AMG GT3	GT300	OKA; 1	**FSW**; 11	AUT; 5	SUG; 4	FSW; 2	SUZ; 19	CHA; 2	**TRM**; 3		**1st**	**77**
2018	Good Smile Racing & TeamUKYO	Mercedes AMG GT3	GT300	OKA; 8	FSW; 5	SUZ; 8	CHA; 7	FSW; 2	SUG; 3	AUT; 19	TRM; 3		4th	56
2019	Good Smile Racing & TeamUKYO	Mercedes AMG GT3	GT300	OKA; 8	FSW; 6	SUZ; 4	CHA; 12	FSW; 8	AUT; 4	SUG; 2	TRM; 5		4th	47.5
2020	Good Smile Racing & TeamUKYO	Mercedes AMG GT3 Evo	GT300	FSW; 9	FSW; 27	FSW; 8	TRM; 9	FSW; 8	SUZ; 3	TRM; 2	FSW; 15		8th	36
2021	Good Smile Racing & TeamUKYO	Mercedes AMG GT3 Evo	GT300	OKA; 14	FSW; 8	SUZ; 5	MOT; 3	SUG; 23	AUT; 6	MOT; Ret	FSW; 4		10th	33
2022	Good Smile Racing & TeamUKYO	Mercedes AMG GT3 Evo	GT300	OKA; 7	FSW; 16	SUZ; 11	FSW; 13	SUZ; 1	SUG; Ret	AUT; 6	TRM; 7		9th	33
2023	Good Smile Racing & TeamUKYO	Mercedes AMG GT3 Evo	GT300	OKA; 9	FSW; Ret	SUZ; 18	FSW; **12**	SUZ; 5	SUG; 5	AUT; 6	TRM; 11		14th	20
2024	Good Smile Racing & TeamUKYO	Mercedes AMG GT3 Evo	GT300	OKA; 9	FSW; 4	SUZ; 12	FSW; 2	SUG; 20	AUT; 16	TRM; 10	SUZ; 10		8th	30
2025	Good Smile Racing & TeamUKYO	Mercedes AMG GT3 Evo	GT300	**OKA**; 4	FSW; 9	SEP	FS1; 2	FS2 (5)	SUZ; 5	SUG; 4	AUT; 10	TRM; 8	5th	74.5
2026	Good Smile Racing & TeamUKYO	Mercedes AMG GT3 Evo	GT300	OKA; 4	FSW; 8	FSW; 13	SUZ; 22	SUG; 10	AUT; 17	TRM; 8	TRM; Ret		19th	38

=== 24 Hours of Le Mans results ===
Year	Team	Co-Drivers	Car	Class	Laps	Pos.	Class Pos.
2008	(Japan) Dome Racing Team	(Japan) Yuji Tachikawa (Japan) Daisuke Itō	Dome S102-Judd	LMP1	272	33rd	13th
