= Suzuka Circuit =

Motorsport track in Japan

Suzuka International Racing Course
The Spiritual Home of Japanese Motorsport

- Grand Prix Circuit (2003–present)
- Location: Suzuka, Mie Prefecture, Japan
- Coordinates: 34°50′30″N 136°32′20″E
- Capacity: 155,000
- FIA Grade: 1
- Owner: Honda Motor Co., Ltd. (1962–present)
- Operator: Honda Mobilityland (2006–present)
- Broke ground: June 1961; 65 years ago
- Opened: 20 September 1962; 64 years ago
- Architect: John Hugenholtz
- Major events: Current: Formula One; Japanese Grand Prix (1987–2006, 2009–2019, 2022–present); FIM EWC; Suzuka 8 Hours (1978–2019, 2022–present); Intercontinental GT Challenge; Suzuka 1000 km (1966–1973, 1980–2019, 2025); Super GT; Suzuka GT 300 km Race (1993, 1995–present); Super Formula (1973–present); Super Taikyu (????–present); Future: GT World Challenge Asia (2017–2019, 2022–2024, 2027); Former: Grand Prix motorcycle racing Japanese motorcycle Grand Prix (1987–1998, 2000–2003); WTCR Race of Japan (2011–2014, 2018–2019); FIA GT (1997–1998); NASCAR Thunder Special Suzuka (1996–1997); World Sportscar Championship (1989–1992)
- Website: www.suzukacircuit.jp

Grand Prix Circuit (2003–present)
- Length: 5.807 km (3.608 mi)
- Turns: 18
- Race lap record: 1:30.965 ( (Italy) Andrea Kimi Antonelli, Mercedes AMG W16, 2025, F1)

Motorcycle Grand Prix Circuit (2004–present)
- Length: 5.821 km (3.617 mi)
- Turns: 17
- Race lap record: 2:04.387 ( (Japan) Takumi Takahashi, Honda CBR1000RR, 2019, SBK)

East Circuit (1987–present)
- Length: 2.243 km (1.394 mi)
- Turns: 7
- Race lap record: 0:48.245 ( (Japan) Toshihiro Kaneishi, Dallara F399, 1999, F3)

West Circuit (1987–present)
- Length: 3.466 km (2.154 mi)
- Turns: 9
- Race lap record: 0:58.396 ( (Japan) Toranosuke Takagi, Reynard 2KL, 2000, Formula Nippon)

Motorcycle Grand Prix Circuit (2003)
- Length: 5.824 km (3.619 mi)
- Turns: 17
- Race lap record: 2:04.970 ( (Italy) Valentino Rossi, Honda RC211V, 2003, MotoGP)

Grand Prix Circuit (2002)
- Length: 5.821 km (3.617 mi)
- Turns: 18
- Race lap record: 1:36.125 ( (Germany) Michael Schumacher, Ferrari F2002, 2002, F1)

Grand Prix Circuit (1987–2001)
- Length: 5.860 km (3.641 mi)
- Turns: 18
- Race lap record: 1:36.944 ( (Germany) Ralf Schumacher, Williams FW23, 2001, F1)

Grand Prix Circuit (1983–1986)
- Length: 5.945 km (3.694 mi)
- Turns: 17
- Race lap record: 1:54.400 ( (Sweden) Stefan Johansson, March 842, 1984, F2)

Original Circuit (1962–1982)
- Length: 6.004 km (3.731 mi)
- Turns: 17
- Race lap record: 1:52.990 ( (Japan) Kazuyoshi Hoshino, March 802, 1980, F2)

The Suzuka International Racing Course (Japanese: 鈴鹿国際レーシングコース, Hepburn: Suzuka Kokusai Rēshingu Kōsu), a.k.a. the Suzuka Circuit (鈴鹿サーキット, Suzuka Sākitto), is a 5.807 km (3.608 mi) long motorsport race track located in Ino, Suzuka City, Mie Prefecture, Japan, and operated by Honda Mobilityland, a subsidiary of Honda Motor Co, Ltd. It has a capacity of 155,000. It is most well known for its use in the international Formula One and Japanese Super Formula championships.

== History ==
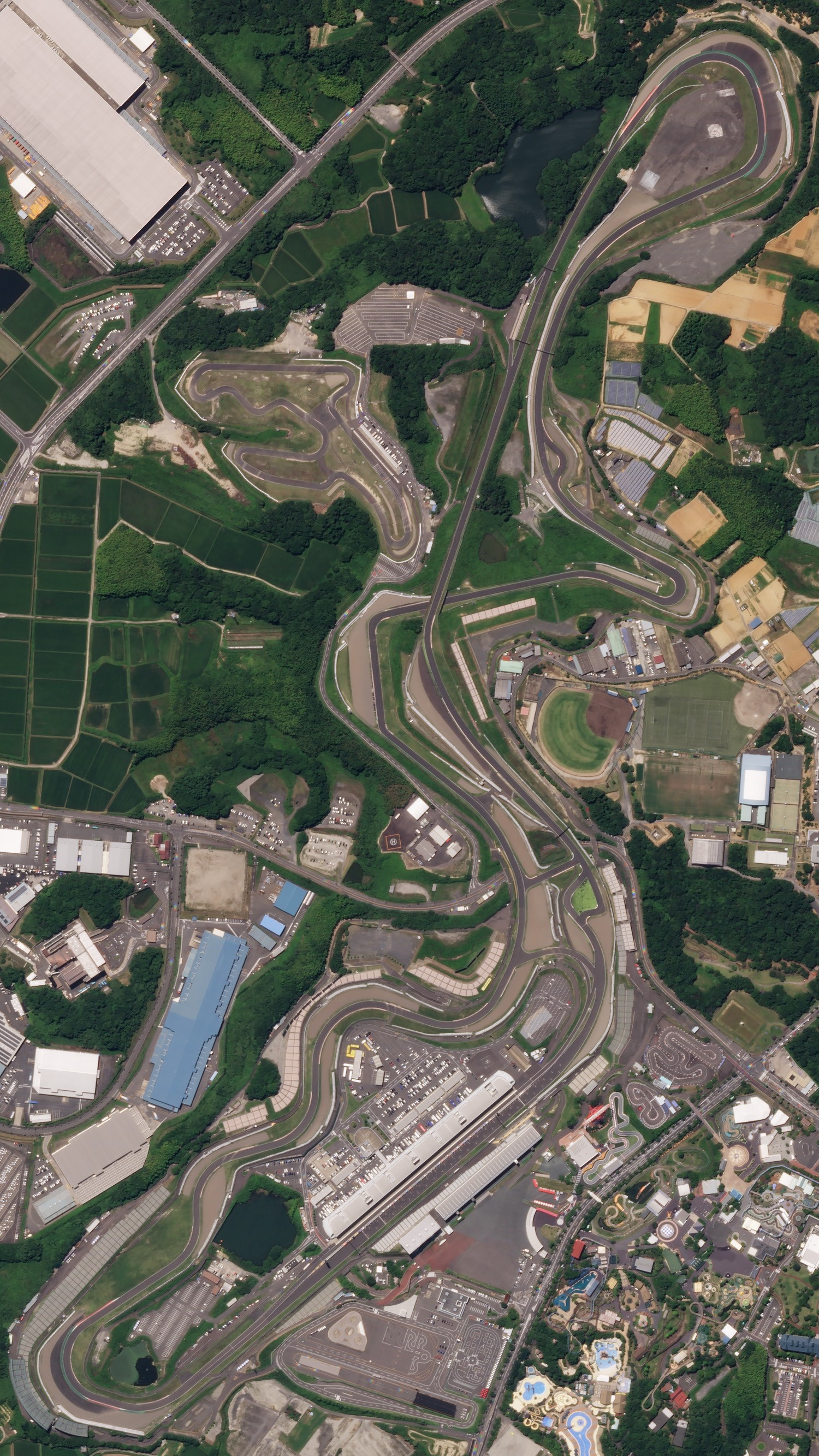
The circuit as it appeared in 2018

Soichiro Honda decided to develop a new permanent circuit in Mie prefecture in the late 1950s. Designed as a Honda test track in 1962 by Dutchman John "Hans" Hugenholtz, the track has a figure-of-eight layout, with the 1.2 km (0.75 mi) long back straight passing over the front section by means of an overpass. It is the only FIA Grade 1 licensed track to have such a layout, after the Fiorano Circuit was downgraded to Grade 2 in 2024.

The circuit has been modified at least eight times:

In 1983 a chicane was inserted at the last curve to slow the cars into the pit straight; the original circuit was an extremely fast track with only one slow corner; without the Casio chicane some cars would go through the final long right-hand corner flat out and then would go past the pits at more than 200 mph (320 km/h). In 1984 the first part of Spoon was made slightly slower and the corner was brought closer to the track to expand run-off area there, and in 1985 the first corner was made slightly slower.

In 1987 the circuit was brought up to F1 and Grand Prix motorcycle standards for both Japanese Grands Prix of their respective championships, the F1 Grand Prix being the first held at Suzuka. The Degner curve was made into two corners instead of one long curve, and more crash barriers, more run-off areas were added, exposed vegetation was barricaded off and straw bales were removed (but still used for the Japanese motorcycle Grand Prix).

In 2002, the chicane was slightly modified, 130R (marked as 15 on the diagram) was also modified and some of the snake curves were made a bit straighter and faster; additionally, the runoff area at the Dunlop Curve was doubled from 12 to 25 m (39 to 82 ft), and the corner itself was made slightly tighter.

In 2003, the chicane was made slightly faster and closer to the 130R.

Following the death of Daijiro Kato at the 2003 Japanese motorcycle Grand Prix, Suzuka reconfigured the motorcycle variant of what is now known as the Hitachi Automotive Systems Chicane before the final turn, and added a second chicane, between the hairpin and 200R.

The circuit can be used in five configurations; the car full circuit, the motorcycle full circuit, the "Suzuka east," "Suzuka west car," and "Suzuka west motorcycle" configurations. The "east" portion of the course consists of the pit straight to the first half of the Dunlop curve (turn seven), before leading back to the pit straight via a tight right-hander. The "west" course is made up of the other part of the full circuit, including the crossover bridge; the straight leading to the overpass is used for the start/finish line and the grid. The chicane between the hairpin and 200R separates the west and full course sections between cars and motorcycles.

The Degner curve was named in honour of Ernst Degner after he crashed his factory Suzuki 50 there during Suzuka's inaugural All Japan Championship Road Race meeting on 3 November 1962.

At the 2014 Japanese Grand Prix, F1 driver Jules Bianchi suffered serious injuries after colliding with a recovery vehicle, and died in hospital as a result nine months later. In the wake of the accident, the Dunlop corner was slightly changed and revised in safety standards, and the organisers of the Japanese Grand Prix installed a large crane in place of the tractor that Bianchi hit.

In preparation for the 2025 Japanese Grand Prix, the circuit was resurfaced from Turn 1 to the entry of Turn 8.

== 130R corner ==
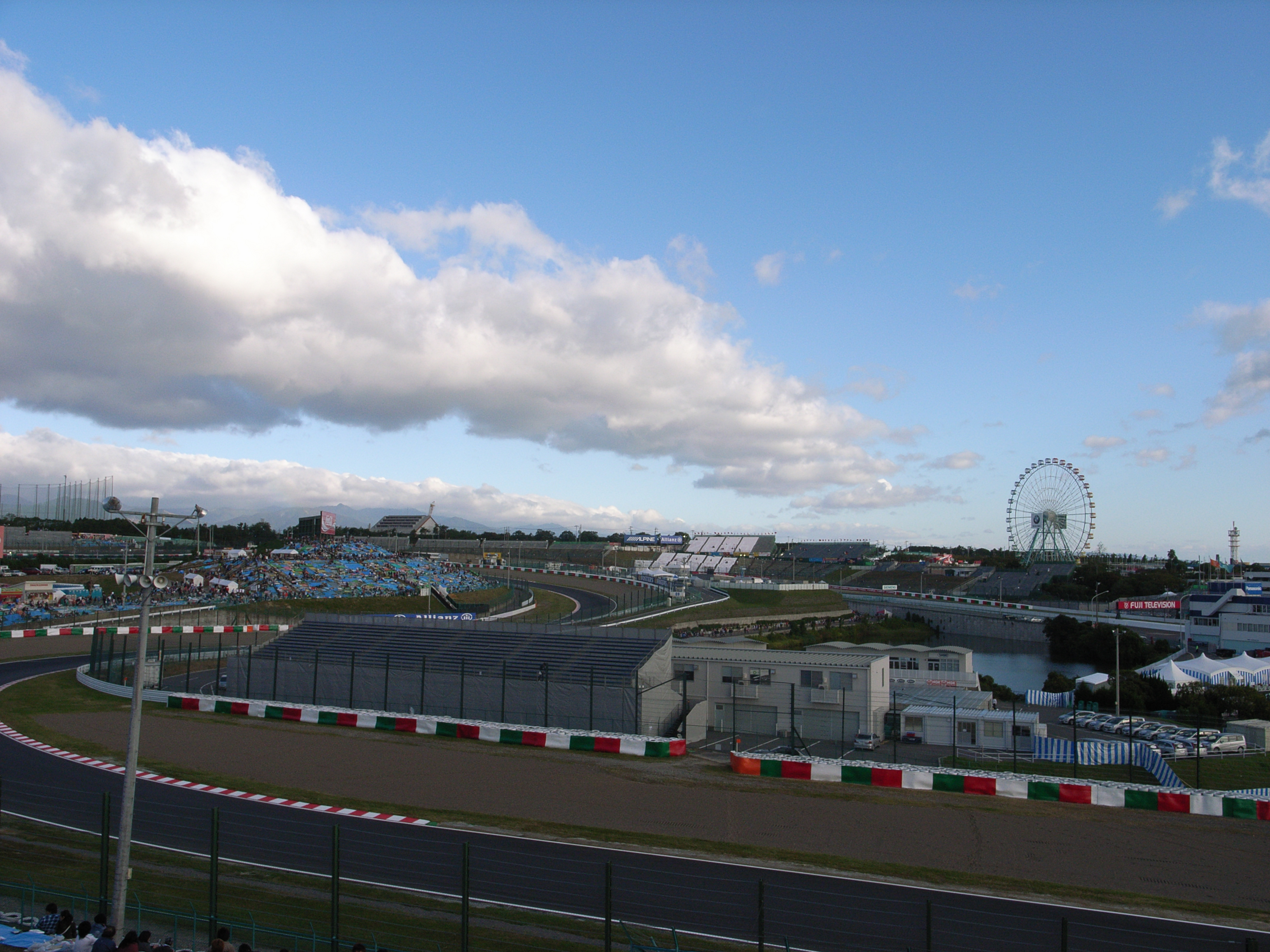
The Suzuka Circuit seen in 2006

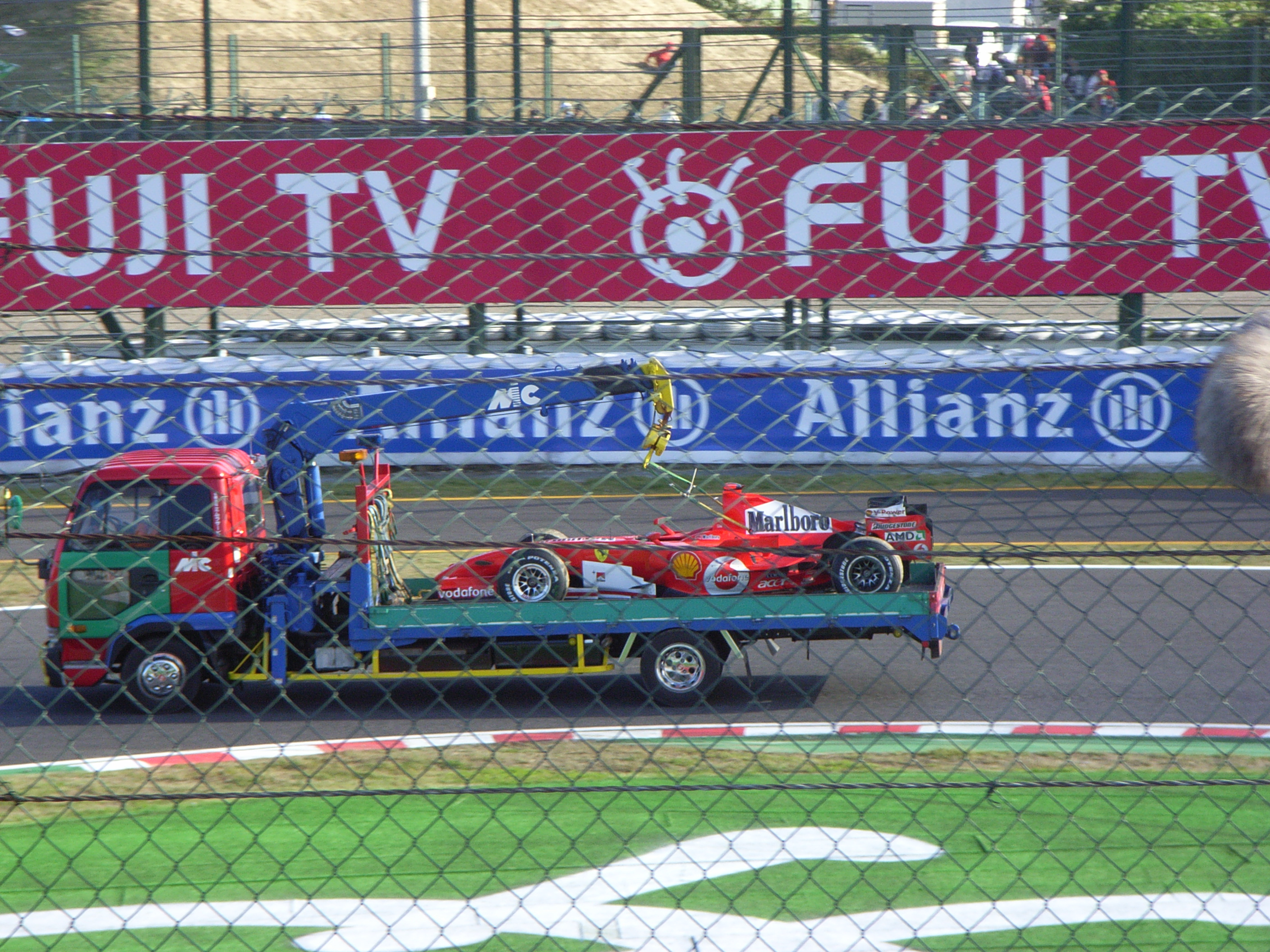
Michael Schumacher's Ferrari 248 F1 being towed away after retiring from the 2006 Japanese Grand Prix

Following two major accidents in 2002 and 2003, one of the main issues in safety has been at the corner 130R. In 2002, Toyota F1 driver Allan McNish suffered a high-speed crash through the bump, which sent him through a metal fence; he was not seriously injured.

Track officials revised the 130R, redesigning it as a double-apex section, one with an 85 m (279 ft) radius, and then a second featuring a 340 m (1,120 ft) radius, leading to a much closer Casio triangle (chicane), with the chicane becoming a "bus stop" type for motorcycles.

However, the problem continued for the new revised section. During the 2003 MotoGP Grand Prix of Japan, the track's first major event since the revisions, MotoGP rider Daijiro Kato was killed when he crashed in the new section, on his way to the braking zone for the Casio triangle. MotoGP has not returned to Suzuka since the incident.

In November 2026, Cygames announced a one-year naming right to 130R, renaming it as the "Umamusume 130R".

== Layout configurations ==
Suzuka International Racing Course layout history
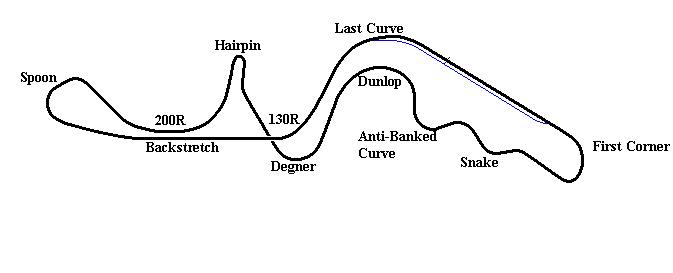
Original Grand Prix Circuit (1962–1982)

Grand Prix Circuit (1987–2002)

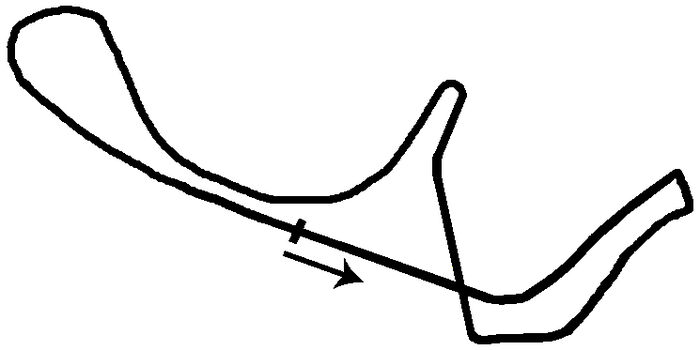
West Circuit (1987–present)

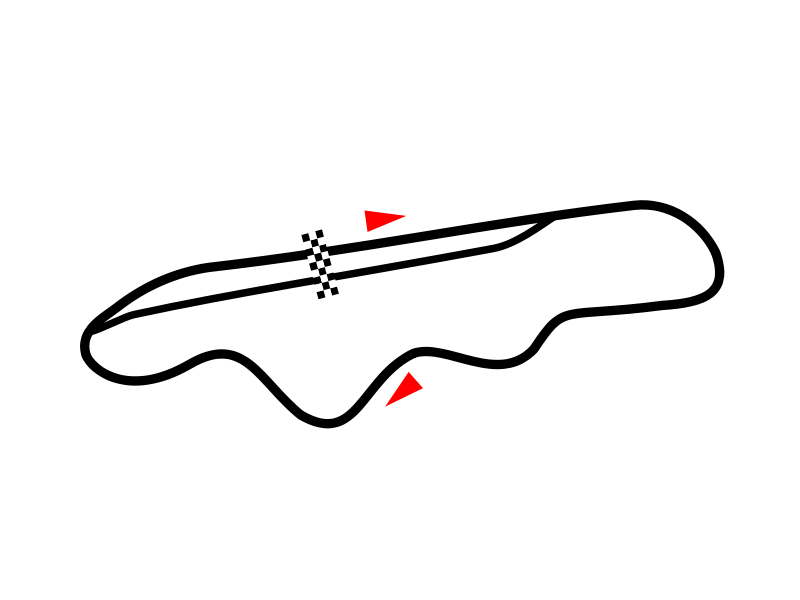
East Circuit (1987–present)

Grand Prix Circuit (2003–present)

== Motorsport events ==
Suzuka, openly touted by F1 drivers and fans as one of the most enjoyed, is also one of the oldest remaining tracks of the Formula One World Championship, and has a long history of races as venue of the Japanese Grand Prix since 1987. Its traditional role as one of the last Grands Prix of the season means numerous world championships have been decided at the track. Four years consecutively in its early history the circuit saw the world championship decided. These include the 1988 championship, which went to Ayrton Senna, the controversial 1989 championship, which went to Alain Prost, and the 1990 and 1991 world championships, which both went to Senna.

Suzuka was dropped from the Formula One calendar for the 2007 and 2008 seasons in favour of the Toyota-owned Fuji Speedway, after the latter underwent a transformation and redesign by circuit designer Hermann Tilke. Suzuka and Fuji were to alternate hosting the Japanese Grand Prix from 2009. However, after Fuji announced in July 2009 that it would no longer be part of the F1 calendar, Suzuka signed a deal to host the Japanese Grand Prix in 2009, 2010 and 2011.

The circuit closed for a year for renovations to make it F1-compliant for 2009, with the last major event held on November 18, 2007, although some annual events (for example, the Suzuka 8 Hours and Suzuka 1000 km) were still held. The track held a re-opening day on April 12, 2009.

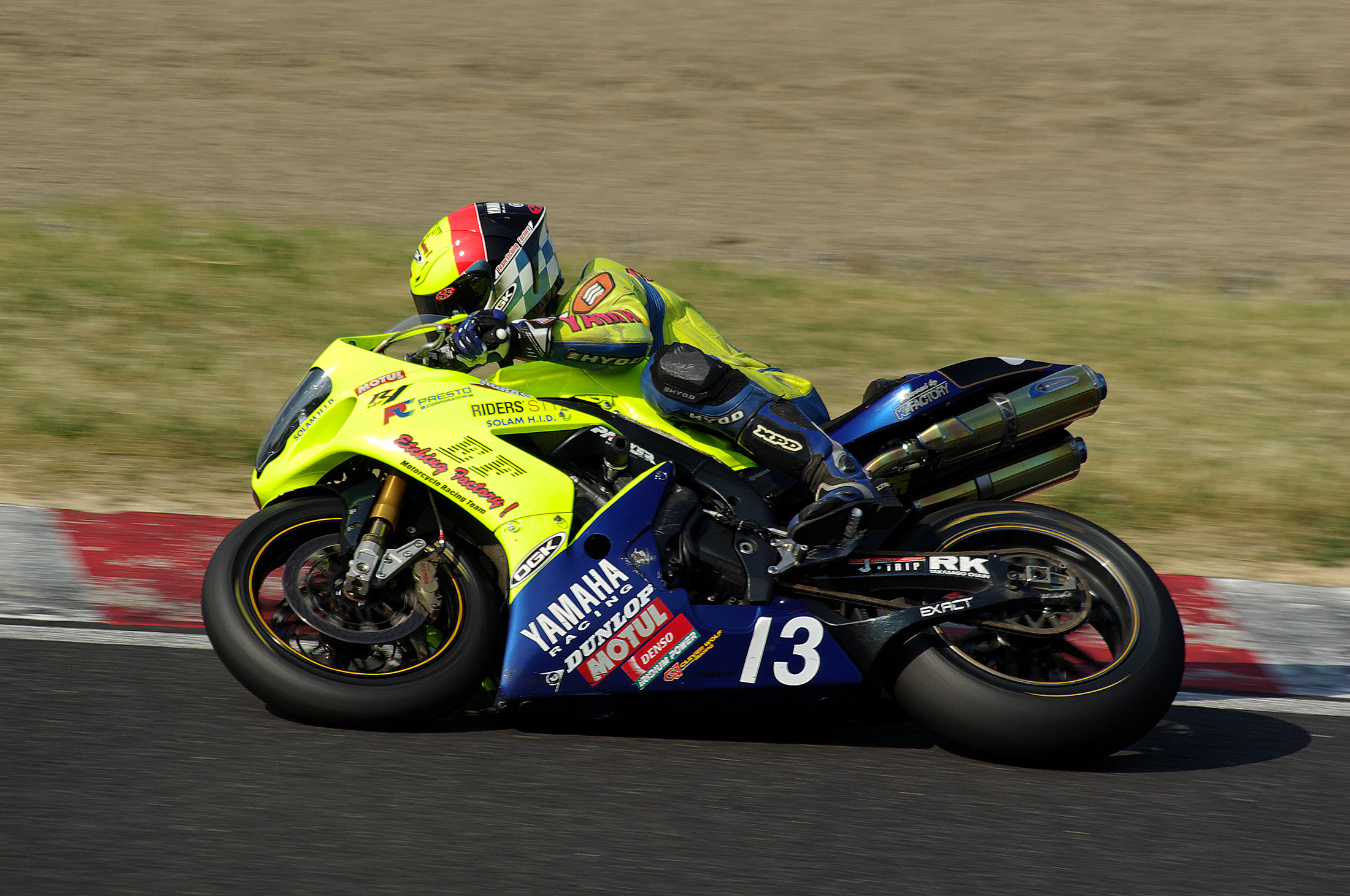
Yamaha YZF-R1 of Team Etching Factory at the qualifying session of the Suzuka 300 km endurance race (2010)

Suzuka also hosts other motorsport events including the Suzuka 1000 km endurance race. Previously a part of multiple GT racing series including the now defunct group C class of the All Japan Sports Prototype Championship, the Suzuka 1000 km as of 2006 is now a points round of the Super GT Series, and is the only race of such length in that series. In 2010, the GT500 pole position time was 1:55.237. In 2007, the GT300 pole position time was 2:06.838.

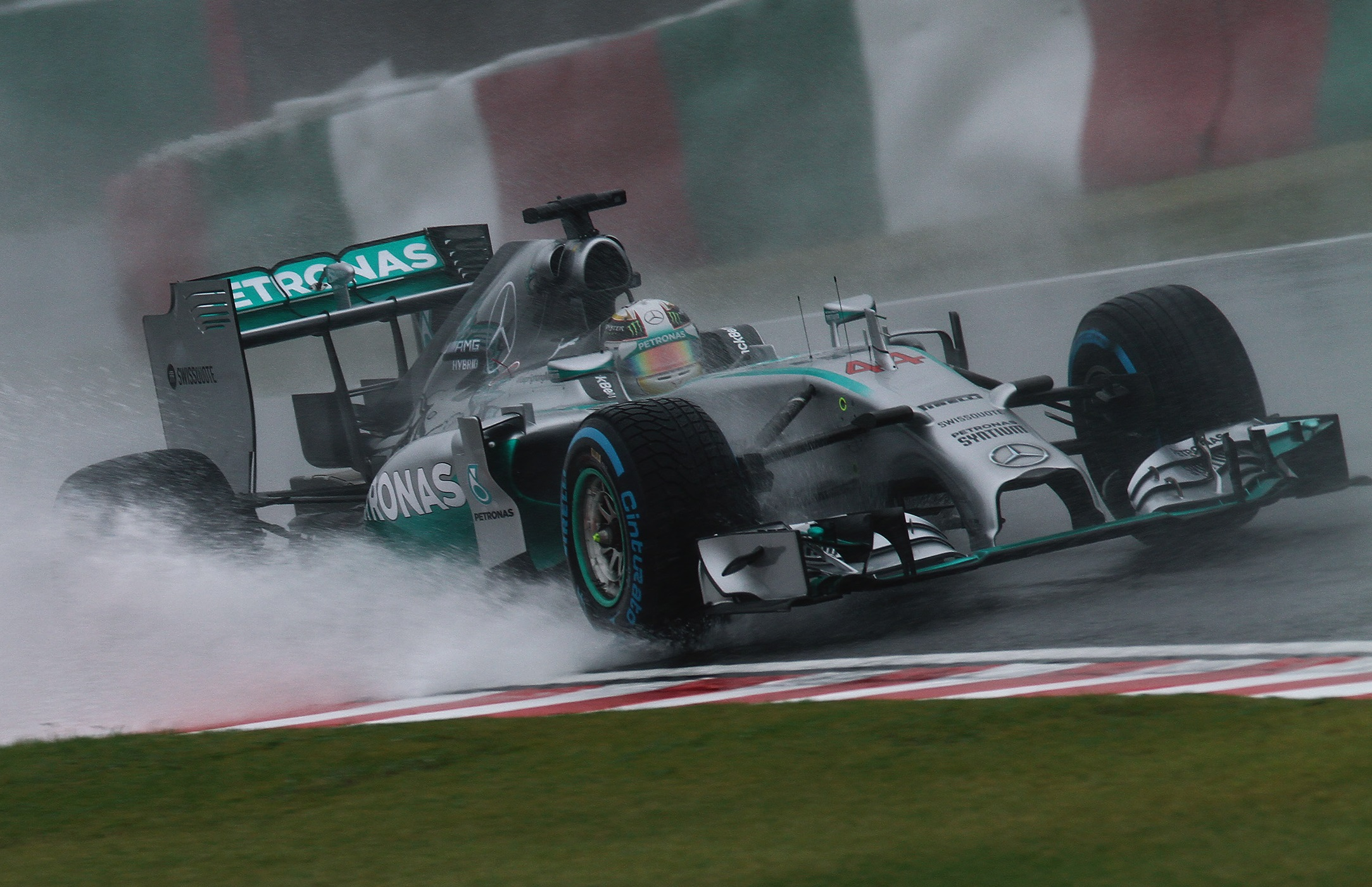
Lewis Hamilton won the 2014 Japanese Grand Prix, a race marred by the fatal accident of Jules Bianchi.

Another major motorsport event is the Suzuka 8 Hours for motorcycles, which has been run since 1978. This event usually attracts big name riders and with the exception of 2005, due to the importance of the major manufacturers' involvement, the FIM ensures that no motorcycle races clash on the date.

NASCAR organized the NASCAR Thunder 100, a pair of exhibition 100-lap races on the east circuit, a 2.243 km (1.394 mi) layout which utilizes the pit straight and esses, before rejoining the main circuit near the Casio triangle. The cars were Sprint Cup Series and Camping World West Series cars and the field was by invitation for the two races, run after the 1996 and 1997 seasons. The 1996 event was marred by tragedy when during practice, pace car driver Elmo Langley died of a heart attack in the Chevrolet Corvette pace car at the esses during an evaluation run. The pole position speed was 83.079 mph (133.703 km/h). During qualifying for the 1997 race, rain caused Goodyear to use rain tires on Winston Cup cars for the first time in the modern era.

It was announced on June 21, 2010, that the east section of the Suzuka Circuit would host the Japanese round of the 2011 WTCC season instead of the Okayama International Circuit. At the 2012 event, the pole position time was 0:52.885 seconds, for an average speed of 94.875 mph (152.687 km/h).

=== Event list ===
Current

- March: Formula One Japanese Grand Prix, Ferrari Challenge Japan, Porsche Carrera Cup Japan, Formula Regional Japanese Championship
- April: Super Taikyu
- May: Super Formula Championship, Super Formula Lights, Formula Regional Japanese Championship
- July: FIM Endurance World Championship Suzuka 8 Hours, Ferrari Challenge Japan
- August: Super GT, F4 Japanese Championship
- September: Intercontinental GT Challenge Suzuka 1000 km, Japan Cup Series, Porsche Carrera Cup Japan
- October: MFJ Superbike MFJ Grand Prix
- November: Super Formula Championship JAF Suzuka Grand Prix

Future

- GT World Challenge Asia (2017–2019, 2022–2024, 2027)
- Lamborghini Super Trofeo Asia (2016–2019, 2027)

Former

- All-Japan Sports Prototype Championship (1983–1992)
- All Japan Grand Touring Car Championship (1993, 1995–2004)
- Asia Road Racing Championship (2013–2019)
- Audi R8 LMS Cup (2017, 2019)
- BPR Global GT Series
  - Suzuka 1000 km (1994–1996)
- F3 Asian Championship (2019)
- Ferrari Challenge Asia-Pacific (2012–2013, 2016, 2018, 2022)
- FIA GT Championship
  - Suzuka 1000 km (1997–1998)
- Formula Challenge Japan (2006–2013)
- Formula Dream (1999–2003)
- Grand Prix motorcycle racing
  - Japanese motorcycle Grand Prix (1987–1998, 2000–2003)
- International Touring Car Championship (1996)
- Japanese Formula 3 Championship (1979–2019)
- Japanese Touring Car Championship (1985–1998)
- NASCAR Thunder Special Suzuka (1996–1997)
- Porsche Carrera Cup Asia (2019, 2023–2024)
- Superrace Championship (2013)
- TCR Japan Touring Car Series (2019–2024)
- World Sportscar Championship (1989–1992)
- World Touring Car Championship
  - FIA WTCC Race of Japan (2011–2014)
- World Touring Car Cup
  - FIA WTCR Race of Japan (2018–2019)

== Lap records ==
The official lap record for the current circuit layout is 1:30.965, set by Andrea Kimi Antonelli during the 2025 Japanese Grand Prix. The unofficial lap record for the current circuit layout is 1:26.983, set by Max Verstappen during the qualifying session of 2025 Japanese Grand Prix.

As of September 2026, the fastest official race lap records at the Suzuka Circuit are listed as:

Category	Time	Driver	Vehicle	Event
Grand Prix Circuit (2003–present): 5.807 km (3.608 mi)
Formula One	1:30.965	Andrea Kimi Antonelli	Mercedes-AMG F1 W16 E Performance	2025 Japanese Grand Prix
Super Formula	1:37.850	Naoki Yamamoto	Dallara SF19	2020 1st Suzuka Super Formula Championship round
Formula Nippon	1:42.781	João Paulo de Oliveira	Swift FN09	2012 1st Suzuka Formula Nippon round
Super GT (GT500)	1:47.135	Teppei Natori	Nissan Z NISMO GT500	2024 Suzuka GT 300 km Race
Super Formula Lights	1:50.714	Ritomo Miyata	Dallara 320	2020 Suzuka Super Formula Lights round
Formula Three	1:52.116	Mitsunori Takaboshi	Dallara F312	2017 1st Suzuka Japanese F3 round
Formula Regional	1:54.401	Ryota Horachi	Dome F111/3	2026 1st Suzuka FRJC round
Super GT (GT300)	1:58.934	Jin Nakamura	Lexus LC 500h GT	2024 Suzuka GT 300 km Race
GT3	1:59.966	Ayhancan Güven	Porsche 911 (992 II) GT3 R	2026 Suzuka 1000 km
Ferrari Challenge	2:01.749	Motohiro Kotani	Ferrari 296 Challenge	2026 1st Suzuka Ferrari Challenge Japan round
Formula Challenge Japan	2:01.896	Ryo Hirakawa	Tatuus FC106	2012 2nd Suzuka Formula Challenge Japan round
Porsche Carrera Cup	2:02.120	Robert de Haan	Porsche 911 (992 II) Cup	2026 1st Suzuka Porsche Carrera Cup Japan round
Formula Dream	2:02.875	Takashi Takasaki	Dome FD	2004 6th Suzuka Formula Dream round
Lamborghini Super Trofeo	2:03.171	Ben Gersekowski	Lamborghini Huracán Super Trofeo	2018 Suzuka Lamborghini Super Trofeo Asia round
GT2	2:06.738	Mitsuhiro Kinoshita	Porsche 911 (997) GT3 RSR	2009 300 km of Suzuka
Formula Toyota	2:07.387	Hideto Yasuoka	Tom's FT30	2004 1st Suzuka Formula Toyota round
Formula 4	2:07.705	Yuto Nomura	Toray Carbon Magic MCSC-24	2024 2nd Suzuka Japanese F4 round
TC1	2:09.063	Gabriele Tarquini	Honda Civic WTCC	2014 FIA WTCC Race of Japan
TCR Touring Car	2:11.509	Takuro Shinohara	Audi RS 3 LMS TCR	2020 Suzuka TCR Japan round
GT4	2:12.392	Takeshi Suehiro	Porsche 718 Cayman GT4 RS Clubsport	2026 Suzuka SRO Japan Cup round
Super 2000	2:14.392	Franz Engstler	BMW 320 TC	2014 FIA WTCC Race of Japan
Motorcycle Grand Prix Circuit (2004–present): 5.821 km (3.617 mi)
Superbike	2:04.387	Takumi Takahashi	Honda CBR1000RR	2019 1st Suzuka All Japan Road Race Championship round
FIM EWC	2:06.604	Andrea Locatelli	Yamaha YZF-R1	2025 Suzuka 8 Hours
Supersport	2:11.294	Akihiro Arakawa	Honda CBR600RR	2020 Suzuka All Japan Road Race Championship round
Moto3	2:17.182	Daiki Uehara	Honda NSF250R	2022 2nd Suzuka All Japan Road Race Championship round
Asia Production 250	2:27.872	Rheza Danica Ahrens	Honda CBR250RR	2018 Suzuka Asia Road Racing Championship round
Asia Underbone 150	2:37.852	Gupita Kresna	Yamaha T-150	2019 Suzuka Asia Road Racing Championship round
East Circuit (1987–present): 2.243 km (1.394 mi)
Formula Three	0:48.245	Toshihiro Kaneishi	Dallara F399	1999 3rd Suzuka Japanese F3 round
Superbike	0:50.054	Shinichi Ito	Honda CBR1000RR	2009 2nd Suzuka All Japan Road Race Championship round
Formula Toyota	0:51.049	Hideto Yasuoka	Tom's FT30	2004 2nd Suzuka Formula Toyota round
250cc	0:51.904	Yuichi Ui	Yamaha TZ250	2009 2nd Suzuka All Japan Road Race Championship round
Supersport	0:53.274	Goh Iwata	Honda CBR600RR	2009 2nd Suzuka All Japan Road Race Championship round
Super Touring	0:53.344	Takuya Kurosawa	Honda Accord	1996 Suzuka JTCC round
Super 2000	0:53.885	Alain Menu	Chevrolet Cruze 1.6T	2012 FIA WTCC Race of Japan
TCR Touring Car	0:53.888	Norbert Michelisz	Hyundai i30 N TCR	2019 WTCR Race of Japan
125cc	0:58.281	Takehiro Yamamoto	Honda RS125R	2009 2nd Suzuka All Japan Road Race Championship round
West Circuit (1987–present): 3.466 km (2.154 mi)
Formula Nippon	0:58.396	Toranosuke Takagi	Reynard 2KL	2000 2nd Suzuka Formula Nippon round
Formula Three	1:03.635	Paolo Montin	Dallara F301	2001 2nd Suzuka Japanese F3 round
Motorcycle Grand Prix Circuit (2003): 5.824 km (3.619 mi)
MotoGP	2:04.970	Valentino Rossi	Honda RC211V	2003 Japanese motorcycle Grand Prix
Superbike	2:08.679	Atsushi Watanabe	Suzuki GSX-R1000	2003 2nd Suzuka All Japan Road Race Championship round
250cc	2:09.839	Hiroshi Aoyama	Honda NSR250	2003 Japanese motorcycle Grand Prix
125cc	2:14.282	Stefano Perugini	Aprilia RS125R	2003 Japanese motorcycle Grand Prix
Supersport	2:14.479	Takeshi Tsujimura	Honda CBR600RR	2003 2nd Suzuka All Japan Road Race Championship round
Grand Prix Circuit (2002): 5.821 km (3.617 mi)
Formula One	1:36.125	Michael Schumacher	Ferrari F2002	2002 Japanese Grand Prix
LMP900	1:54.168	Seiji Ara	Audi R8	2002 Suzuka 1000km
JGTC (GT500)	1:58.531	Ralph Firman	Honda NSX-GT	2002 Suzuka GT 300 km
Formula Three	1:59.888	Shinya Sato	Dallara F302	2002 1st Suzuka Japanese F3 round
Formula Dream	2:06.447	Yuki Shibata	Dome FD	2002 4th Suzuka Formula Dream round
MotoGP	2:06.938	Masatoshi Kagayama	Suzuki GSV-R	2002 2nd Suzuka All Japan Road Race Championship round
Superbike	2:07.055	Makoto Tamura	Honda VTR1000SPW	2002 2nd Suzuka All Japan Road Race Championship round
Formula Toyota	2:07.992	Daiki Ikeda	Tom's FT30	2002 2nd Suzuka Formula Toyota round
JGTC (GT300)	2:09.060	Yasutaka Hinoi	Mosler MT900R	2002 Suzuka GT 300 km
250cc	2:09.809	Daisaku Sakai	Honda RS250R	2002 2nd Suzuka All Japan Road Race Championship round
GT	2:14.517	Romain Dumas	Porsche 911 (996) GT3-RS	2002 1000 km of Suzuka
Supersport	2:14.944	Tatsuya Yamaguchi	Honda CBR600F4i	2002 2nd Suzuka All Japan Road Race Championship round
125cc	2:15.934	Katsuhara Toshinaga	Honda RS125R	2002 2nd Suzuka All Japan Road Race Championship round
Porsche Carrera Cup	2:16.422	Toshiyuki Ochiai	Porsche 911 (996 II) GT3 Cup	2002 Suzuka Porsche Carrera Cup Japan round
Grand Prix Circuit (1987–2001): 5.860 km (3.641 mi)
Formula One	1:36.944	Ralf Schumacher	Williams FW23	2001 Japanese Grand Prix
F3000	1:44.258	Toshio Suzuki	Lola T95/50	1995 Suzuka Japanese F3000 round
Formula Nippon	1:46.278	Michael Krumm	Reynard 95D	1996 Suzuka Formula Nippon round
Group C	1:49.148	Derek Warwick	Jaguar XJR-14	1991 430 km of Suzuka
Group C2	1:54.899	Mauro Martini	Nissan R91CK	1992 1000 km of Suzuka
IMSA GTP	1:55.474	Mauro Martini	Nissan R93CK	1993 1000 km of Suzuka
GT1 (Prototype)	1:56.416	Allan McNish	Porsche 911 GT1-98	1998 Suzuka 1000km
Prototype	1:58.512	Geoff Lees	Reynard 89DGC	1989 Suzuka 200km
Formula Three	2:00.210	Paolo Montin	Dallara F301	2001 1st Suzuka Japanese F3 round
GT1	2:03.684	Jean-Marc Gounon	Ferrari F40 GTE	1996 1000 km of Suzuka
Class 1 Touring Cars	2:03.886	Bernd Schneider	AMG Mercedes-Benz C-Klasse	1996 ITC Suzuka round
FIA Cup	2:06.641	Ferdinand de Lesseps	Spice SE89C	1992 1000 km of Suzuka
500cc	2:06.746	Max Biaggi	Honda NSR500	1998 Japanese motorcycle Grand Prix
WSC	2:07.116	Franck Fréon	Kudzu DG-3	1995 1000 km of Suzuka
JGTC	2:07.322	Aguri Suzuki	Nissan Skyline GT-R (BCNR33)	1997 300 km Suzuka
GT1 (GTS)	2:07.876	Julian Bailey	Lister Storm	2000 1000 km of Suzuka
250cc	2:08.581	Shinya Nakano	Honda NSR250	2000 Japanese motorcycle Grand Prix
Formula Toyota	2:09.200	Masato Shimoyama	Tom's FT20	2001 Suzuka Formula Toyota round
GT2	2:13.558	Eiji Yamada	Chrysler Viper GTS-R	2000 300 km of Suzuka
125cc	2:15.353	Masao Azuma	Honda RS125R	2001 Japanese motorcycle Grand Prix
IMSA GTS	2:16.068	Bob Sobey	Ford Mustang GT	1993 1000 km of Suzuka
Group A	2:16.177	Masahiro Hasemi	Nissan Skyline GT-R (BNR32)	1991 Suzuka JTCC round
IMSA GTU	2:20.848	Eduardo Dibos	Mazda RX-7 GTU	1993 1000 km of Suzuka
Group B	2:22.853	Akihiko Nakaya	Porsche 911 (964) Carrera RSR 3.8	1993 1000 km of Suzuka
Porsche Carrera Cup	2:30.635	Takashi Inoue	Porsche 911 (996 I) GT3 Cup	2001 Suzuka Porsche Carrera Cup Japan round
Group N1	2:31.803	Masami Miyoshi	Nissan Skyline GT-R (BNR32)	1993 1000 km of Suzuka
Grand Prix Circuit (1983–1986): 5.945 km (3.694 mi)
Formula Two	1:54.400	Stefan Johansson	March 842	1984 JAF Grand Prix
Group C	1:56.486	Kazuyoshi Hoshino	Nissan R86V	1986 International Suzuka 1000 km
Original Grand Prix Circuit without Final Chicane (1962–1982): 6.004 km (3.731 mi)
Formula Two	1:52.990	Kazuyoshi Hoshino (Note: Both drivers took the same lap time independently in different races.); Teo Fabi	March 802	1980 JAF Grand Prix; 1981 1st Suzuka Japanese F2 round
Group 5 (Sports Car)	2:01.160	Fumiyasu Sato	March 73S	1979 Suzuka 500 mile
Group 4	2:08.040	Fumiyasu Sato	BMW M1	1982 Suzuka 1000km
Group 6	2:31.000	Kuniomi Nagamatsu	Porsche 908	1970 300 km of Suzuka
250cc	2:31.200	Mike Hailwood	Honda RC165	1965 Japanese motorcycle Grand Prix
125cc	2:34.300	Luigi Taveri	Honda RC148	1965 Japanese motorcycle Grand Prix
50cc	2:46.200	Hugh Anderson	Suzuki 50 GP	1965 Japanese motorcycle Grand Prix
Group 1	2:59.400	Goro Urushiyama	Honda S600	1965 2nd Suzuka Clubman Race Meeting

== In video games ==
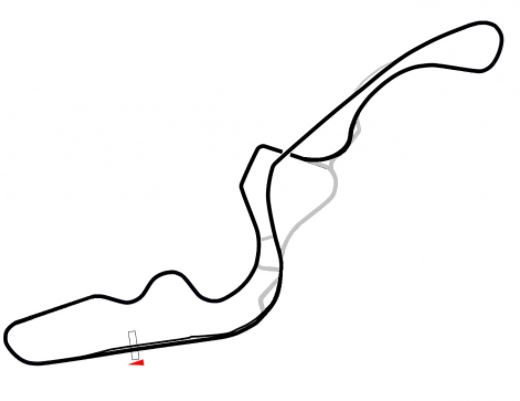
Layout of the Fictional Sakitto Circuit, used in Project CARS to replace the Suzuka Circuit. Notice the absence of the hairpin, the Casio triangle, the modified esses section and a road pass through replacing the Ferris Wheel location.

Along with Fuji Speedway, the Suzuka Circuit was one of the four tracks featured in the video game Pole Position II. The track is referred to in the Namco Museum versions of the game as the "Wonder Circuit" ("Orange Circuit" in Namco Museum: Virtual Arcade), after Namco's "Wonder" series of amusement parks, despite its logo appearing on the starter's box since 1983.

The Suzuka Circuit is also featured in the Final Lap series of games which first appeared in 1987. Another Namco racing game, Suzuka 8 Hours, based on the motorcycle race of the same name was released for arcades in 1992, followed by a port for the Super NES in 1993. It can also be seen in arcade games and video games such as Ferrari F355 Challenge, Super Monaco GP, Forza series, Gran Turismo series, RaceRoom, iRacing, R: Racing Evolution, Shift 2 Unleashed, Le Mans 24 Hours, The Cycles, MotoGP 3 of PlayStation 2, MotoGP 4, Tourist Trophy, Auto Modellista, Racing Battle: C1 Grand Prix, Real Racing 3, and as the final race in Taito's racing game Continental Circus. The east course was featured in NASCAR 98. Suzuka's Ferris wheel was paid homage in the "Big Forest Track" in Virtua Racing. The track has been modded into Mario Kart Wii.

Project CARS and Project CARS 2 have a Japanese circuit inspired by Suzuka, called Sakitto Circuit. Sakitto has numerous visual differences from the original Suzuka, including the change of position of the Ferris wheel near to Degner curves, as well as the absence of the Casio triangle and the hairpin, a very modified esses section, and a road pass through the real life location of the Ferris wheel.

== See also ==
- Mobility Resort Motegi, another Honda-owned race track and oval, host to the FIM MotoGP Japanese Grand Prix
