= Bruce Jouanny =

French racing driver

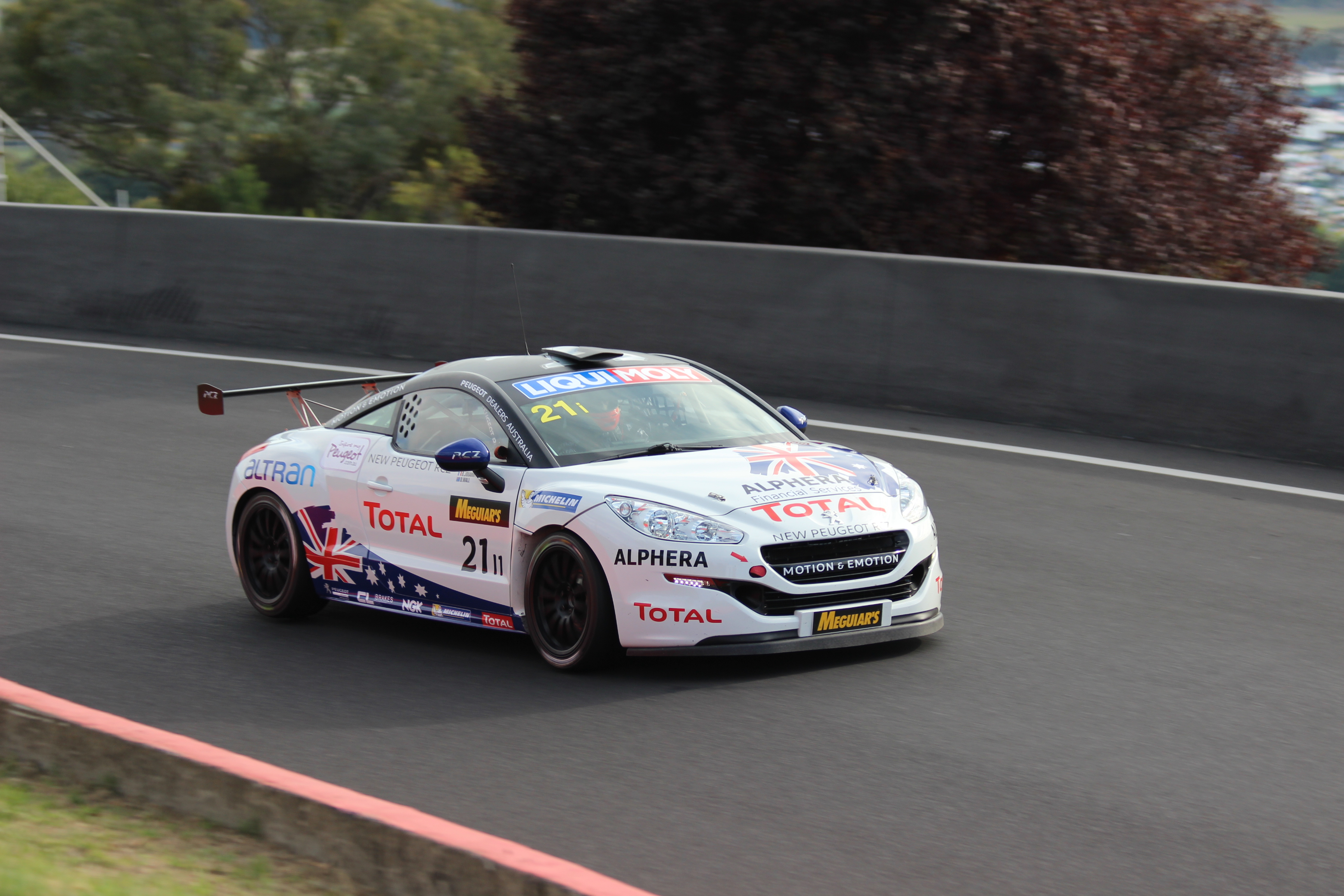
- Jouanny at the 2013 Bathurst 12 Hour
- Nationality: (France) French
- Born: 11 June 1978 (age 48) Paris, France

Le Mans Series (LMP1) career
- Debut season: 2005
- Current team: Pescarolo Sport
- Categorisation: FIA Silver
- Former teams: Saulnier Racing, Courage Compétition, Rollcentre Racing
- Starts: 9
- Wins: 0
- Poles: 0
- Fastest laps: 0
- Best finish: 4th (LMP2) in 2005

Previous series
- 2007 2006 2003–04 2001–02 2001 2000 1998–99: Le Mans Series LMP2; Formula Renault 3.5 Series; World Series by Nissan; British Formula Three Championship; All-Japan Formula Three; Formula Palmer Audi Junior; French Formula Renault

Championship titles
- 2000: Formula Palmer Audi Junior

Awards
- – Prix Jean Rondeau for Best Rookie in the Le Mans 24H 2005 – Marcel Albers Prize at the F3 MArlboro MAsters of Zandvoort for Fastest Lap 2002.
24 Hours of Le Mans career
- Years: 2005, 2007, 2009
- Teams: Courage Compétition, Saulnier Racing, Pescarolo Sport
- Best finish: 8th (2009)
- Class wins: 0

Bruce Jouanny (born 11 June 1978 in Paris, France) is a French former racing driver.

Jouanny started his career in his homeland of France, before moving on to international series. In 2000, he won his only career title to date – the Formula Palmer Audi Junior series. He progressed onwards to Formula Three series around the world, including the British Formula Three Championship. His best series standing in the British version was 4th in 2002.

Jouanny then moved on to World Series by Nissan, now known as World Series by Renault, which he participated in the 2003 season, 2004 season and 2006 season. His best series standing was ninth in 2004.

Jouanny now participates in the Le Mans Series and the Le Mans 24 hours, with a best 24 Hours of Le Mans ranking of 8th in the 2009 race. He currently drives for Pescarolo Sport in the Le Mans Series.

Jouanny was the official test and development driver of the Superleague Formula. Bruce was also a world feed commentator of the Superleague Formula and commentated alongside Ben Edwards and Jonathan Green. In 2024, Jouanny joined the FIA World Endurance Championship broadcast team as a pit lane reporter.

== 24 Hours of Le Mans results ==
Year	Team	Co-Drivers	Car	Class	Laps	Pos.	Class Pos.
2005	(France) Courage Compétition	(France) Jonathan Cochet (Japan) Shinji Nakano	Courage C60H-Judd	LMP1	52	DNF	DNF
2007	(Spain) Saulnier Racing	(France) Jacques Nicolet (France) Alain Filhol	Courage LC75-AER	LMP2	224	DNF	DNF
2009	(France) Pescarolo Sport	(France) Christophe Tinseau (Portugal) João Barbosa	Pescarolo 01-Judd	LMP1	368	8th	8th

=== Formula Renault 3.5 Series results ===
(key) (Races in bold indicate pole position) (Races in italics indicate fastest lap)

Year	Entrant	1	2	3	4	5	6	7	8	9	10	11	12	13	14	15	16	17	DC	Points
2006	RC Motorsport	ZOL; 1; 17	ZOL; 2; 9	MON; 1; 14	IST; 1; 19	IST; 2; 13	MIS; 1; 21	MIS; 2 Ret	SPA; 1 Ret	SPA; 2; 22	NÜR; 1; 14	NÜR; 2; 11	DON; 1; 9	DON; 2; 19	LMS; 1; 20	LMS; 2; 8	CAT; 1; 13	CAT; 2; 11	29th	7
