= 1997 Australian Formula Ford Championship =

Motor racing competition

Seasons
- ← 1996 1998 →

The 1997 Australian Formula Ford Championship was a CAMS sanctioned Australian motor racing title for drivers of Formula Ford racing cars. It was 28th national series to be held in Australia for Formula Fords and the fifth to be contested under the Australian Formula Ford Championship name. The championship, which was promoted as the Ford Motorsport / Slick 50 Australian Formula Ford Championship, was won by Western Australian Garth Tander, driving a Van Diemen RF95.

== Calendar ==
The championship was contested over an eight-round series with two races per round.

Round	Circuit	Dates	Round winner	Map
1	(Victoria (state)) Calder Park Raceway	15 March	(Australia) Garth Tander	1997 Australian Formula Ford Championship is located in Australia
2	(Victoria (state)) Phillip Island Grand Prix Circuit	13 April	(Australia) Todd Kelly	1997 Australian Formula Ford Championship is located in Australia
3	(Victoria (state)) Sandown Raceway	27 April	(Australia) Garth Tander	1997 Australian Formula Ford Championship is located in Australia
4	(New South Wales) Eastern Creek Raceway	27 May	(Australia) Marcos Ambrose	1997 Australian Formula Ford Championship is located in Australia
5	(Queensland) Lakeside International Raceway	15 June	(Australia) Marcos Ambrose	1997 Australian Formula Ford Championship is located in Australia
6	(Western Australia) Wanneroo Raceway	6 July	(Australia) Todd Kelly	1997 Australian Formula Ford Championship is located in Australia
7	(South Australia) Mallala Motor Sport Park	13 July	(Australia) Garth Tander	1997 Australian Formula Ford Championship is located in Australia
8	(New South Wales) Oran Park Raceway	3 August	(Australia) Marcos Ambrose	1997 Australian Formula Ford Championship is located in Australia

== Results ==
Championship points were awarded at each race on the following basis:

Position	1st	2nd	3rd	4th	5th	6th	7th	8th	9th	10th
Points	20	16	14	12	10	8	6	4	2	1

Pos	Driver	No.	Car	Entrant	(Victoria (state)) CAL	(Victoria (state)) PHI	(Victoria (state)) SAN	(New South Wales) EAS	(Queensland) LAK	(Western Australia) WAN	(South Australia) MAL	(New South Wales) ORA	Pts
1	(Australia) Garth Tander	17	Van Diemen RF95	Fastlane Racing	40	20	40	32	14	32	40	30	248
2	(Australia) Marcos Ambrose	4	Van Diemen RF97	Marcos Ambrose	26	16	28	40	40	22	30	36	238
3	(Australia) Todd Kelly	12	Van Diemen RF95	Todd Kelly	-	32	32	10	30	40	1	21	166
4	(Australia) Craig Zerner	35	Van Diemen RF95	Craig Zerner	32	-	20	26	-	-	10	20	108
5	(Australia) Greg Ritter	36	Van Diemen RF94	Greg Ritter	14	24	-	6	26	-	26	1	97
6	(Australia) Christian Jones	27	Spectrum 06	George Stockman	-	18	-	-	28	13	16	12	87
=	(Australia) Aaron McNally	74	Van Diemen RF97	Aaron McNally	6	14	12	10	-	18	1	26	87
8	(Australia) Adam Macrow	71	Spectrum 06	Team Arrow	18	2	12	10	14	2	2	-	60
9	(Australia) Justin Cotter	7	Mygale SJ95	Justin Cotter	12	4	14	14	-	-	-	4	48
10	(Australia) Phillip Scifleet	77	Spectrum 06	Phillip Scifleet	3	-	1	22	-	1	2	12	41
11	(Australia) John Blanchard	3	Mygale SJ97	Apache Constructors	-	24	-	14	-	-	-	-	38
12	(Australia) Scott Bargwanna	9	Van Diemen RF95	Scott Bargwanna	-	-	18	-	2	-	-	14	34
13	(Australia) Kerry Wade	14	Van Diemen RF94		12	-	-	-	-	20	-	-	32
=	(Australia) Brett Burvill	73	Van Diemen RF92	Fastlane Racing	10	-	-	-	-	-	22	-	32
15	(Australia) Ray Stubber	54	Spectrum 06		-	-	-	-	-	20	-	-	20
16	(Australia) Dugal McDougall	8	Mygale SJ97	Apache Constructors	2	-	-	-	16	-	-	-	18
17	(Australia) Damien White	31	Spectrum 06	Team Arrow	-	14	2	-	-	-	-	-	16
18	(Singapore) Christian Murchison	52	Van Diemen RF94; Van Diemen RF95	Fastlane Racing	-	-	-	-	-	4	10	-	14
=	(New Zealand) Ken Smith	73	Van Diemen RF92	Fastlane Racing	-	-	-	-	-	-	14	-	14
20	(Australia) Ashley Cutchie	15	Swift SC96K	Swift Racing Cars	-	-	-	-	12	-	-	-	12
=	(Australia) Cameron Schearer	48	Mygale SJ95	Apache Constructors	1	-	-	-	1	10	-	-	12
22	(Australia) Wayne Stoddard	46	Vector MG96	W Stoddard	10	-	-	-	-	-	-	-	10
=	(Australia) Rodney Forbes	25	Van Diemen RF92	R Forbes	-	-	-	-	-	-	-	10	10
24	(Australia) Dean Lindstrom	19	Van Diemen RF91		-	6	2	-	-	-	-	-	8
=	(Australia) Michael Simpson	38	Van Diemen RF96	M Simpson	-	8	-	-	-	-	-	-	8
=	(Australia) Tim Leahey	75	Van Diemen RF96B	Tim Leahey	-	-	-	-	-	-	8	-	8
27	(Australia) Scott Marsh	42	Swift SC92F	S Marsh	-	4	-	2	-	-	-	-	6
28	(Australia) Andrew Reid	26	Swift SC97K	Inspired Racing	-	-	-	-	1	-	4	-	5
29	(Australia) Murray Ditton	41	Spectrum 06	Murray Ditton	-	-	4	-	-	-	-	-	4
=	(Australia) Owen Ow	55	Van Diemen RF94		-	-	-	-	-	4	-	-	4
31	(Australia) Christopher Dell	57	Van Diemen RF94	Christopher Dell	-	-	-	-	2	-	-	-	2
32	(Australia) Sam Oliver	80	Van Diemen RF94	Prix Max	-	-	1	-	-	-	-	-	1
Pos	Driver	No.	Car	Entrant	(Victoria (state)) CAL	(Victoria (state)) PHI	(Victoria (state)) SAN	(New South Wales) EAS	(Queensland) LAK	(Western Australia) WAN	(South Australia) MAL	(New South Wales) ORA	Pts
