= 2004 Macau Grand Prix =

Formula Three motor race

Race details
Date	21 November 2004
Official name	51st Macau Grand Prix
Location	Guia Circuit, Macau
Course	Temporary street circuit 6.120 km (3.803 mi)
Distance	Qualifying Race; 10 laps, 61.200 km (38.028 mi); Main Race; 11 laps, 67.320 km (41.831 mi)
Weather	Qualifying Race: Sunny and dry Main Race: Sunny and dry
- Qualifying Race

Pole
Driver	(Poland) Robert Kubica	Manor Motorsport
Time	2:12.155

Fastest Lap
Driver	(United Kingdom) Lewis Hamilton	Manor Motorsport
Time	2:12.801 (on lap 9 of 10)

Podium
First	(United Kingdom) Lewis Hamilton	Manor Motorsport
Second	(Germany) Nico Rosberg	Team Rosberg
Third	(France) Alexandre Prémat	ASM Formule 3
- Main Race

Pole
Driver	(United Kingdom) Lewis Hamilton	Manor Motorsport

Fastest Lap
Driver	(Poland) Robert Kubica	Manor Motorsport
Time	2:13.215 (on lap 9 of 11)

Podium
First	(France) Alexandre Prémat	ASM Formule 3
Second	(Poland) Robert Kubica	Manor Motorsport
Third	(Brazil) Lucas di Grassi	Hitech Racing

The 2004 Macau Grand Prix (formally the 51st Macau Grand Prix) was a Formula Three race (F3) held on the streets of Macau on 21 November 2004. Unlike other races, such as the Masters of Formula 3, the 2004 Macau Grand Prix was not part of any F3 championship, but was open to entries from any F3 championship. The Macau Grand Prix featured two races for the first time in its history: a ten-lap qualifying race that determined the starting grid for the fifteen-lap main race. The Macau Grand Prix was held for the 51st time in 2004, and the 22nd for F3 cars.

ASM Formula 3's Alexandre Prémat won the Grand Prix after finishing third in the previous day's qualification race, which was won by Manor Motorsport's Lewis Hamilton. Prémat took the race lead when Nico Rosberg and Hamilton went too fast into a corner and slid into a tyre barrier at Lisboa corner and held it for the rest of the race to win after it ended early for a four-car pile up at Police Bend that made the circuit impassable on the 13th lap. Robert Kubica finished second while third was Hitech Racing's Lucas di Grassi.

== Background and entry list ==
The Macau Grand Prix is a Formula Three (F3) race considered to be a stepping stone to higher motor racing categories such as Formula One and has been termed the territory's most prestigious international sporting event. The Macau Grand Prix was held for the 51st time in 2004, and the 22nd time under F3 rules. It was held on the 6.2 km (3.9 mi) 22 turn Guia Circuit on 21 November 2004 with three preceding days of practice and qualifying.

Drivers had to race in a Fédération Internationale de l'Automobile (FIA)-regulated championship meeting during 2004, either in the Formula 3 Euro Series or one of the domestic championships, with the highest-placed drivers receiving priority in being invited to the race. Each of the three major F3 series had a champion on the 32-car grid. Formula 3 Euro Series champion Jamie Green was joined in Macau by the British champion Nelson Piquet Jr., Japanese series victor Ronnie Quintarelli, Italian champion Matteo Cressoni and Asian series winner Christian Jones. Ho-Pin Tung was the sole driver representing the German series in Macau. Five competitors who did not compete in any F3 championship during the year received invitations to the Grand Prix from race organisers. They were Formula BMW Asia series winner Marchy Lee, and Macau natives Jo Merszei, Michael Ho, Lei Kit Meng and Rodolfo Ávila.

After holding the race over two legs since its inception in 1983, the Macau Grand Prix Committee changed the format in 2004 to a ten-lap qualification race on Saturday afternoon, which determined the starting order for the Grand Prix itself the following day. Furthermore, any driver who retired from the qualification race could start at the back of the grid for the main event and still possibly win. In previous years, any driver who did not complete every lap of the first leg could not win overall. Macau Grand Prix Committee co-coordinator João Manuel Costa Antunes said the changes were made to simplify the Grand Prix for racing fans, increase tension over the weekend, and provide a greater incentive for drivers to push hard without fear of losing their chance of victory.

== Practice and qualifying ==
There were two 30-minute practice sessions prior to Sunday's race: one on Thursday morning and one on Friday morning. In the first practice session, ThreeBond Racing's Fábio Carbone lapped fastest at 2 minutes, 15.216 seconds, six-tenths of a second faster than Richard Antinucci in second. Lewis Hamilton (participating as a free agent after his contract with McLaren had expired), Robert Kubica, Nico Rosberg, Kazuki Nakajima, Quintarelli, Danny Watts, Alexandre Prémat and Naoki Yokomizo were third to tenth. Hamilton's front wheel nut loosened, preventing him from checking his mirrors due to poor visibility. He entered the pit lane to have the problem fixed. After swerving to avoid hitting Álvaro Parente, Kubica grazed a barrier at Lisboa corner. Kubica then understeered into the Melco hairpin wall after running wide on cement laid to clear oil left from a support series.

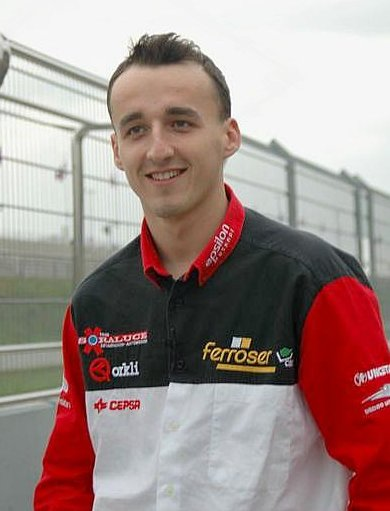
Robert Kubica (pictured in 2005) claimed the first pole position for a Polish driver in the Macau Grand Prix in the final five minutes of the second qualifying session.

Qualifying was divided into two 45-minute sessions; the first was held on Thursday afternoon, and the second on Friday afternoon. Each driver's fastest time from either session counted toward their final starting place in the qualification race. The start of the first qualifying session was delayed by 15 minutes due to multiple accidents during practice for the GT Tires Asian Formula Renault Challenge and CTM Touring Car Cup races. When it did begin in warm and sunny weather, Hamilton never relinquished his early lead as he improved his lap time to 2 minutes, 12.344 seconds. He narrowly avoided crashing into a wall after going wide onto some dust. Green was consistently fast, with his fastest lap coming on his final attempt. He was second, but more than a second behind Hamilton. Carbone, the 2003 pole sitter, was third, with Antinucci moving up to fourth in the final minutes. Watts was second early on but dropped to fifth by the end after saving a set of tyres for Friday. Rosberg finished sixth, ahead of Franck Perera and Nakajima. Both Quintarelli and Parente were in the top five early on but finished ninth and tenth. Adam Carroll was the fastest driver who did not set a top ten lap, followed by his British compatriot James Rossiter. Prémat, Nokomizo, Loïc Duval, Piquet, Rob Austin, Katsuyuki Hiranaka, Tung, Kubica, Ho, Cressoni, Daisuke Ikeda, Lee, Jones, Lucas di Grassi, Marko Asmer, Éric Salignon, Lei, Avila, Merszei and Giedo van der Garde completed the provisional starting order. Van Der Garde crashed on his out-lap at San Francisco Bend corner, removing two wheels. The first red flag came a third of the way through as Salignon crashed at Maternity Bend turn and needed extricating. After a short interval, Kubica, Lee, di Grassi, Ikeda and Asmer stopped at the Melco hairpin and track marshals moved their cars. A second red flag came with ten minutes left as Parente heavily damaged his car against the Teddy Yip Bend corner wall.

Kubica was consistently fast in the second half-hour practice session, lapping fastest at 2 minutes, 12.303 seconds. Hamilton made some changes to his car but was 0.646 seconds slower in second. Carbone, Antinucci, Prémat, Green, Perera, Rosberg, Rossiter and Quintarelli completed the top ten ahead of second qualifying. Although the session did not require a stoppage, three minor incidents occurred: Jones lost control of his vehicle at Moorish Hill corner, and Van der Garde and Carroll were caught off guard at the same turn, but all three did not sustain significant damage to their car. Nakajima collided with a wall just before the Melco hairpin.

The second qualifying session was delayed when a car appeared to be stuck at the Melco hairpin, forcing everyone else to scramble for space on the narrow section of track. Lei crashed into a wall at Faraway turn 12 minutes in and was about to recover when Avila hit him. This triggered the session's first red flag since the circuit became impassable. As drivers began lapping faster, Salignon triggered the second red flags as he crashed into the Maternity Bend corner wall trying to avoid Kubica. The final red flag flew as Nakajima ran wide at the R-Bend turn, spun into a wall, ricocheted into the track's centre, and littered debris. Hamilton did not improve because of the session interruptions and him causing a multi-car accident at the Melco hairpin. With a lap of 2 minutes, 12.155 seconds, his teammate Kubica became the first Polish driver to claim pole position in Macau in the final five minutes. Hamilton joined Kubica on the grid's front row and Anuticci gained one place at the session's end to start from third. Rosberg claimed fourth and Piquet moved eleven places from the first qualifying session to take fifth. Although Green and Carbone lapped faster, they fell to sixth and seventh. Prémat and di Grassi moved to eighth and tenth and separated Nakajima in ninth. Behind them the rest of the field composed of Watts, Duval, Perera, Parente, Quintarelli, Yokomizo, Rossiter, Carroll, Salignon, Hiranaka, Austin, Ikeda, Cressoni, Asmer, Lee, Van der Garde, Tung, Jones, Ho, Avila, Lei and Merszei.

=== Qualifying classification ===
Each of the driver's fastest lap times from the two qualifying sessions are denoted in bold.

Final qualifying classification
Pos	No.	Driver	Team	Q1 Time	Rank	Q2 Time	Rank	Gap	Grid
1	22	(Poland) Robert Kubica	Manor Motorsport	2:17.217	20	**2:12.155**	1		1
2	21	(United Kingdom) Lewis Hamilton	Manor Motorsport	**2:12.344**	1	2:12.415	2	+0.189	2
3	23	(United States) Richard Antinucci	TOM'S	2:13.791	4	**2:12.512**	3	+0.357	3
4	6	(Germany) Nico Rosberg	Team Rosberg	2:14.331	6	**2:12.725**	4	+0.570	4
5	7	(Brazil) Nelson Piquet Jr.	Piquet Sports	2:15.297	16	**2:12.834**	5	+0.679	5
6	8	(United Kingdom) Jamie Green	ASM Formule 3	2:13.372	2	**2:13.051**	6	+0.896	6
7	30	(Brazil) Fábio Carbone	ThreeBond Racing	2:13.786	3	**2:13.093**	7	+0.938	7
8	9	(France) Alexandre Prémat	ASM Formule 3	2:14.776	13	**2:13.132**	8	+0.977	8
9	24	(Japan) Kazuki Nakajima	TOM'S	2:14.345	8	**2:13.160**	9	+1.005	9
10	26	(Brazil) Lucas di Grassi	Hitech Racing	2:19.286	26	**2:13.817**	10	+1.662	10
11	25	(United Kingdom) Danny Watts	Hitech Racing	**2:14.161**	5	2:14.285	11	+2.006	11
12	2	(France) Loïc Duval	Signature Team	2:15.263	15	**2:14.283**	12	+2.128	12
13	14	(France) Franck Perera	Prema Powerteam	**2:14.336**	7	2:14.900	13	+2.181	13
14	18	(Portugal) Álvaro Parente	Carlin Motorsport	2:14.435	10	**2:14.350**	14	+2.195	14
15	4	(Italy) Ronnie Quintarelli	Inging	**2:14.400**	9	2:15.377	15	+2.245	15
16	5	(Japan) Naoki Yokomizo	Inging	2:14.849	14	**2:14.435**	16	+2.280	16
17	3	(United Kingdom) James Rossiter	Signature Team	2:14.655	12	**2:14.543**	17	+2.388	17
18	11	(United Kingdom) Adam Carroll	Menu F3 Motorsport	**2:14.597**	11	2:14.835	18	+2.442	18
19	10	(France) Éric Salignon	ASM Formule 3	2:20.727	28	**2:14.597**	19	+2.442	19
20	15	(Japan) Katsuyuki Hiranaka	Prema Powerteam	2:16.623	18	**2:15.010**	20	+2.855	20
21	12	(United Kingdom) Rob Austin	Menu F3 Motorsport	2:16.088	17	**2:15.167**	21	+3.012	21
22	32	(Japan) Daisuke Ikeda	Swiss Racing Team	2:18.588	23	**2:15.230**	22	+3.075	22
23	16	(Italy) Matteo Cressoni	Ombra Racing	2:17.875	22	**2:15.291**	23	+3.136	23
24	19	(Estonia) Marko Asmer	Carlin Motorsport	2:19.600	27	**2:15.824**	24	+3.669	24
25	33	(Hong Kong) Marchy Lee	Promatecme	2:18.979	24	**2:16.225**	25	+4.070	25
26	1	(Netherlands) Giedo van der Garde	Signature Team	No time	32	**2:16.712**	26	+4.557	26
27	27	(China) Ho-Pin Tung	Hitech Racing	2:16.993	19	**2:16.744**	27	+4.589	27
28	28	(Australia) Christian Jones	TME Racing	2:19.280	25	**2:16.871**	28	+4.716	28
29	29	(Macau) Michael Ho	TME Racing	**2:17.814**	21	2:19.482	29	+5.659	29
30	20	(Macau) Rodolfo Ávila	Carlin Motorsport	2:22.576	30	**2:20.074**	30	+7.919	30
31	17	(Macau) Lei Kit Meng	Ombra Racing	**2:21.298**	29	2:22.636	31	+9.143	31
32	31	(Macau) Jo Merszei	Swiss Racing Team	2:24.250	31	**2:23.963**	32	+11.808	32
110% qualifying time: 2:25.390
**Bold time** indicates the faster of the two times that determined the grid order.

== Warm-up one ==
A ten-minute warm-up session was held on the morning of the qualifying race. Hamilton maintained his strong form to pace the session with a time of 2 minutes, 12.904 seconds, more than two seconds faster than anyone else in the session's early stages. His closest challenger was Carbone in second place. Kubica, Rosberg, Duval, Watts, Di Grassi, Antinucci, Piquet and Nakajima followed in the top ten.

== Qualifying race ==
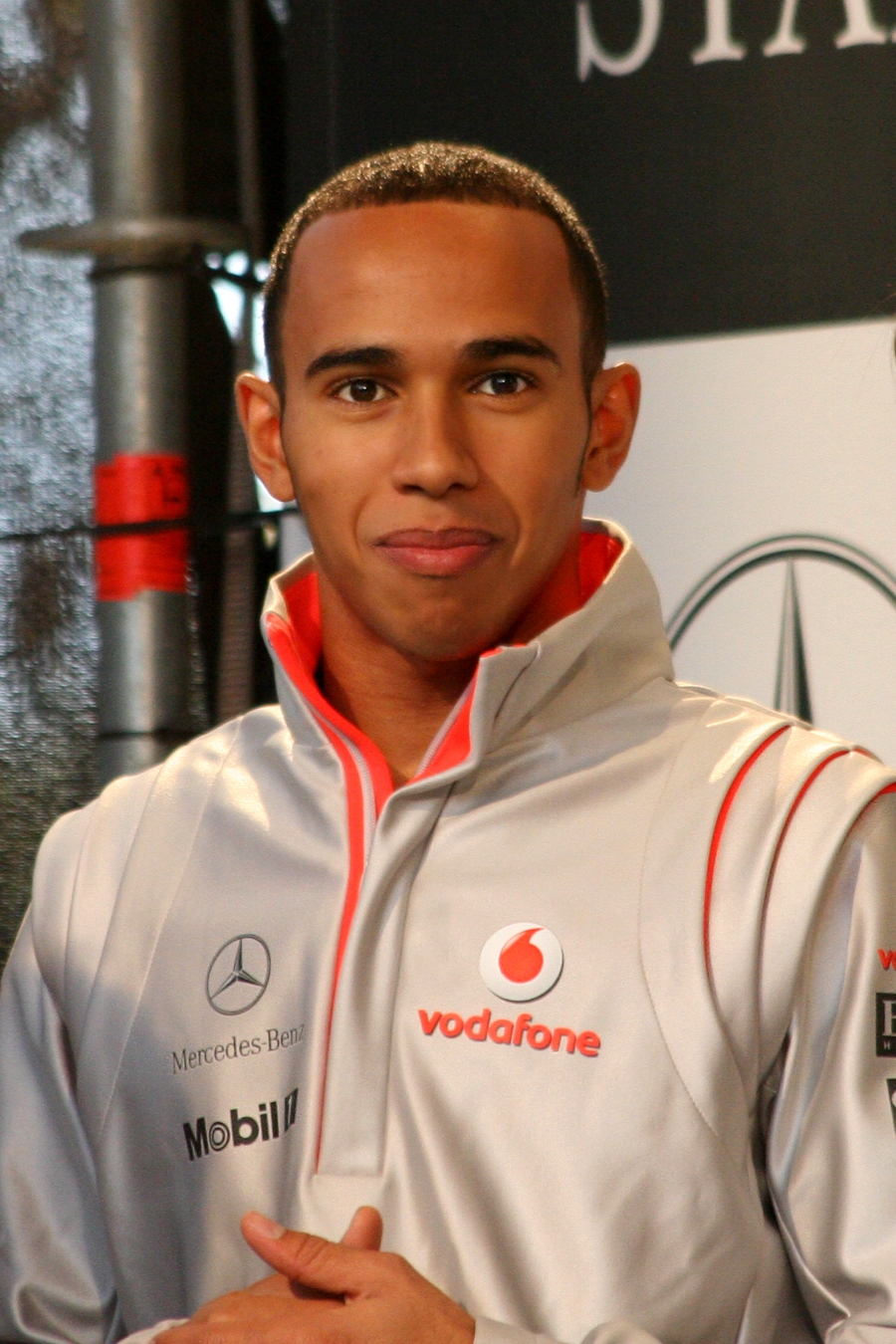
Lewis Hamilton (pictured in 2007) passed teammate Kubica on the first lap of the qualification race and led every lap to win it and started from pole position for the Grand Prix itself.

The qualifying race to set the starting order for the main race began in dry, sunny weather on 20 November at 14:00 Macau Standard Time (UTC+08:00). Hamilton made a strong start to slipstream of his teammate Kubica, who was on the inside line entering Reservoir turn. Hamilton steered left to scare Kubica into slowing and took the lead on the approach to Mandarin Bend, which he maintained entering Lisboa turn. Further back, a series of incidents on the grid called for the safety car's deployment for four laps. Antinucci was slow to leave his starting position, so Piquet went to the right to pass him, but the manoeuvre resulted in him removing his car's left-front wheel. When Nakajima stalled in his grid slot, the rear of his vehicle was hit by Salignon, who then speared into a barrier alongside the track just after the start/finish line, causing a larger accident. Tung glimpsed space to drive through but he was launched airborne after striking the rear of Lee's car, who aggressively turned to the right as Avila got collected.

With debris on the track, the remaining drivers were cautious across the start/finish line and avoided sharp debris to avoid a punctured tyre. Under the safety car, Piquet returned to the pit lane without a fully attached front-left wheel and he retired because his team could not repair it before the race's conclusion. Salignon was trapped in his car and needed help from course officials. This was attributed to the safety car's prolonged presence on the circuit. He was later transported to a local hospital for precautionary observations before being released with no major injuries found. Meanwhile, circuit marshals used a crane to lift the cars off the track and spread cement dust. Hamilton held the lead at the lap five restart and Rosberg passed Kubica into Mandarin Bend corner. Carroll challenged and overtook Perera for eleventh before the end of the fifth lap and set to draw closer to Rossiter. Green passed Carbone for fourth place. Carbone attempted to reclaim fourth but Green's defended the place. Prémat pushed hard and got close to a barrier at Maternity Bend before passing Kubica on the drive to Lisboa turn on lap six.

Duval led a pack of cars further down the order as Rossiter passed Watts (who had front wing damage) and the latter battled Perera. Both were slipstreaming each other on the circuit's main straights. But when Antinucci got involved, things went wrong, and Carroll passed Watts going into Lisboa corner on lap seven. This caught Antinucci off guard, forcing him to take the turn's escape road. Antinucci could not restart his car, and marshals extricated it. Hamilton set the race's fastest lap on lap nine at 2 minutes and 12.801 seconds to lead by 2.2 seconds and win the race for pole position in the Grand Prix itself. Rosberg finished second, with Prémat completing the podium in third. Kubica held off Green in the final stages to finish fourth. Behind them Carbone, Duval, di Grassi, Rossiter, Watts, Carroll, Perera, Hiranaka, Austin, Yokomizo, Quintarelli, Parente, Ikeda, Asmer, Cressoni, Van Der Garde, Jones, Ho, Lei and Merszei were the final classified finishers.

=== Qualifying race classification ===
Final qualifying race classification
Pos	No.	Driver	Team	Laps	Time/Retired	Grid
1	21	(United Kingdom) Lewis Hamilton	Manor Motorsport	10	33:16.057	2
2	6	(Germany) Nico Rosberg	Team Rosberg	10	+2.284	4
3	9	(France) Alexandre Prémat	ASM Formule 3	10	+3.982	8
4	22	(Poland) Robert Kubica	Manor Motorsport	10	+4.984	1
5	8	(United Kingdom) Jamie Green	ASM Formule 3	10	+5.454	6
6	30	(Brazil) Fábio Carbone	ThreeBond Racing	10	+7.551	7
7	2	(France) Loïc Duval	Signature Team	10	+17.289	12
8	26	(Brazil) Lucas di Grassi	Hitech Racing	10	+18.888	10
9	3	(United Kingdom) James Rossiter	Signature Team	10	+19.439	17
10	25	(United Kingdom) Danny Watts	Hitech Racing	10	+20.513	11
11	11	(United Kingdom) Adam Carroll	Menu F3 Motorsport	10	+21.685	18
12	14	(France) Franck Perera	Prema Powerteam	10	+23.761	13
13	15	(Japan) Katsuyuki Hiranaka	Prema Powerteam	10	+24.752	20
14	12	(United Kingdom) Rob Austin	Menu F3 Motorsport	10	+25.335	21
15	5	(Japan) Naoki Yokomizo	Inging	10	+26.494	16
16	4	(Italy) Ronnie Quintarelli	Inging	10	+27.688	15
17	18	(Portugal) Álvaro Parente	Carlin Motorsport	10	+28.012	14
18	32	(Japan) Daisuke Ikeda	Swiss Racing Team	10	+31.813	22
19	19	(Estonia) Marko Asmer	Carlin Motorsport	10	+31.990	24
20	16	(Italy) Matteo Cressoni	Ombra Racing	10	+32.891	23
21	1	(Netherlands) Giedo van der Garde	Signature Team	10	+34.658	26
22	28	(Australia) Christian Jones	TME Racing	10	+55.774	28
23	29	(Macau) Michael Ho	TME Racing	10	+58.889	29
24	17	(Macau) Lei Kit Meng	Ombra Racing	10	+1:43.680	31
25	31	(Macau) Jo Merszei	Swiss Racing Team	10	+2:01.384	32
Ret	23	(United States) Richard Antinucci	TOM'S	8	Stall	3
Ret	7	(Brazil) Nelson Piquet Jr.	Piquet Sports	1	Wheel	5
Ret	10	(France) Éric Salignon	ASM Formule 3	0	Accident	19
Ret	20	(Macau) Rodolfo Ávila	Carlin Motorsport	0	Accident	30
Ret	24	(Japan) Kazuki Nakajima	TOM'S	0	Accident	9
Ret	27	(China) Ho-Pin Tung	Hitech Racing	0	Accident	27
Ret	33	(Hong Kong) Marchy Lee	Promatecme	0	Accident	25
Fastest lap: Lewis Hamilton, 2:12.801, 165.90 km/h (103.09 mph) on lap 9

== Warm-up two ==
A second 20-minute warm-up session was held on the morning of the main race. Kubica recovered from fourth in the qualifying race to lap fastest at 2 minutes, 11.485 seconds. Prémat was almost three-tenths of a second slower in second. Hamilton, Green, Rosberg, Antinucci, Rossiter, Piquet, Watts and Yokomizo completed the top ten. Salignon's chassis was damaged enough from his qualification race crash to be withdrawn from the race.

== Main Race ==
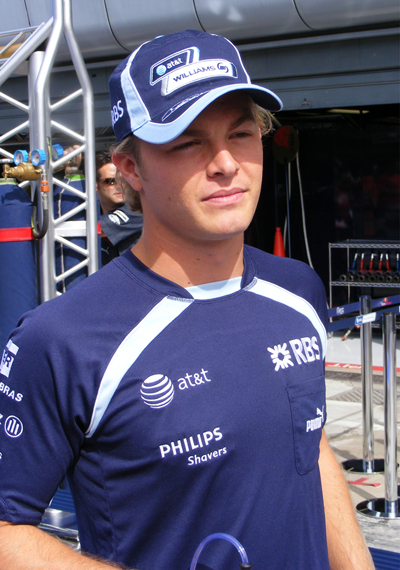
Nico Rosberg (pictured in 2007) took the lead from Hamilton at the start but lost his chance of victory when he ran wide into the wall on lap two.

The race began on 21 November at 15:45 local time in dry, sunny weather. On the grid, Hamilton was slow off the line, and Rosberg took the lead into Mandarin Bend. Prémat held off a challenge from Kubica for third place. Rossiter and his teammate Duval made contact as they approached the Lisboa turn. Both went into the corner's run-off area, and their races ended on the first lap. Rosberg was pushing hard at the start of the second lap in an attempt to gain some space from Hamilton and spent too much time observing the latter in his rearview mirrors, causing him to drive into Lisboa turn too quickly with his brakes locked and slide sideways on oil laid by the support races. Rosberg ran into a tyre barrier with his car's front. Hamilton was also pushing hard when he ran wide. As a result, he was unable to avoid colliding with Rosberg's car. Watts, who was alongside Carroll on the straight and braked late, saw Hamilton's stricken car and drove into the escape road. Hiranaka then collided with Watts, who avoided any visible damage as he returned to the track while the former lost a lot of time restarting his vehicle. Rosberg retired but Hamilton disentangled himself from his car and rejoined the race.

Prémat took the lead after Hamilton and Rosberg's crashes, with Kubica second. Prémat got sideways at Moorish Hill and grazed a wall with his left-rear tyre on that lap. He did not retire because his car was not severely damaged. It allowed Kubica to close the gap, but he was unable to overtake Prémat. Carbone bent the right side of his front wing when he collided with di Grassi's rear, damaging the latter's diffuser. Despite this, di Grassi did not appear to be slowed by the collision. The safety car was deployed on lap three when Parente crashed heavily at the Solitude Esses complex. Track marshals extricated his car and debris was cleared. Prémat checked his car's steering under the safety car and found no problems. Prémat led when the race resumed on the start of lap six. Kubica misjudged its timing, allowing Green to slipstream past him for second entering Lisboa corner. As di Grassi blocked his Brazilian compatriot Carbone from passing for fourth, Kubica's tyres reached their optimum operating temperatures and he began to challenge Green for second.

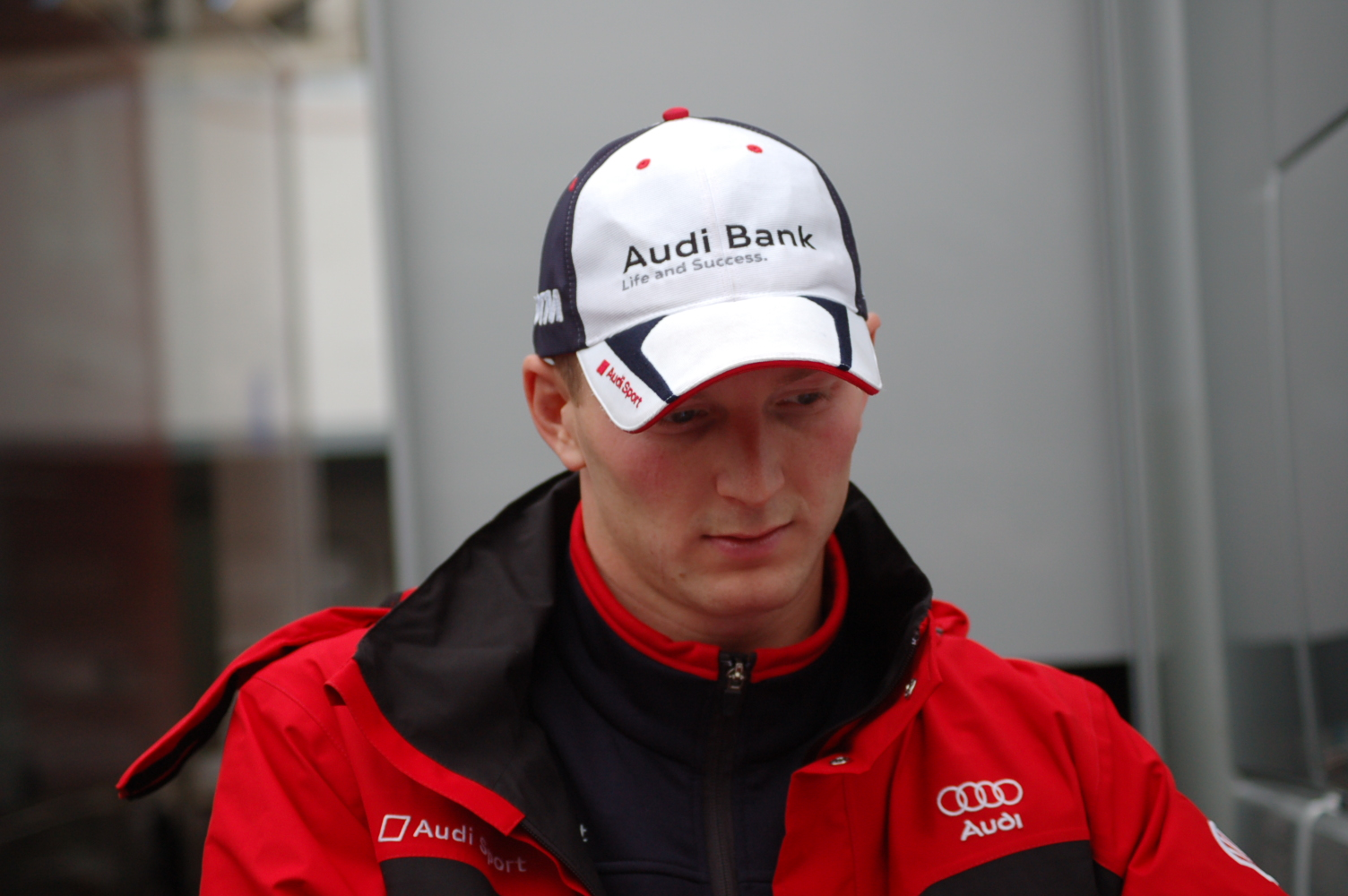
Alexandre Prémat (pictured in 2009) took the lead when Hamilton and Rosberg ran wide on the second lap and held it for the rest of the race to win.

Carroll could not challenge Perera. Carbone slowed as Carroll was near him, allowing di Grassi to pull away slightly. On lap eight, Perera retook sixth from Carroll, and Austin duelled the latter. Green's chance to win were ended on that lap when he sustained a left-rear puncture from possible debris. He lost time running wide at Fisherman's Bend. Kubica overtook Green for second and slowed en route to the pit lane for new tyres. The finishing order appeared to be settled by this point, but Ikeda disrupted the rhythm by crashing into a barrier and had to be extricated via crane. Soon after, Avila and Jones collided at the Solitude Esses complex, and the safety car was deployed at the end of lap nine because the track was temporarily blocked. Yokomizo went off the track under the safety car; it did not extend its on-track time as it was withdrawn when lap eleven ended, with Prémat leading. As Prémat pulled away from Kubica, Carbone took the opportunity to overtake di Grassi for third at Lisboa corner and the latter immediately planned a counter-attack.

Carroll unsuccessfully attempted to overtake Perera and he lost control of his car but avoided a barrier. Meanwhile, Hamilton tried to pass Nakajima when he hit a wall going uphill to the Maternity Bend corner. Di Grassi was blocked by Carobne in an unsuccessful pass. On lap 13, Asmer spun across the track at Police Bend, making it impassable when Hiranka, Jones, and Tung piled into the corner. Officials chose to wave red flags on the lap, and the race result was counted back to the running order at the end of lap eleven. Prémat thus won the race, becoming the third driver, after David Coulthard (1991) and Takuma Sato (2001), to win both the Macau Grand Prix and the Masters of Formula 3 in the same year. Kubica was 0.675 seconds behind in second place. Carbone's overtake on di Grassi was nullified by the stoppage, and the latter finished third. Off the podium, Carbone was fourth, Perera fifth with the British duo of Carroll and Austin sixth and seventh. Quintarelli was eighth, Antinucci gained seventeen positions to finish ninth and Piquet completed the top ten. Asmer, Watts, Nakajima, Hamilton, Van Der Garde, Tung, Jones, Lee, Lei, Green, Merszei, Yokomizo and Hiranka were the final classified finishers.

=== Main Race classification ===
Final main race classification
Pos	No.	Driver	Team	Laps	Time/Retired	Grid
1	9	(France) Alexandre Prémat	ASM Formule 3	11	37:13.731	3
2	22	(Poland) Robert Kubica	Manor Motorsport	11	+0.675	4
3	26	(Brazil) Lucas di Grassi	Hitech Racing	11	+1.178	8
4	30	(Brazil) Fábio Carbone	ThreeBond Racing	11	+1.422	6
5	14	(France) Franck Perera	Prema Powerteam	11	+1.822	12
6	11	(United Kingdom) Adam Carroll	Menu F3 Motorsport	11	+2.219	11
7	12	(United Kingdom) Rob Austin	Menu F3 Motorsport	11	+3.464	14
8	4	(Italy) Ronnie Quintarelli	Inging	11	+3.633	16
9	23	(United States) Richard Antinucci	TOM'S	11	+4.301	26
10	7	(Brazil) Nelson Piquet Jr.	Piquet Sports	11	+5.367	27
11	19	(Estonia) Marko Asmer	Carlin Motorsport	11	+6.154	19
12	25	(United Kingdom) Danny Watts	Hitech Racing	11	+6.463	14
13	24	(Japan) Kazuki Nakajima	TOM'S	11	+6.780	30
14	21	(United Kingdom) Lewis Hamilton	Manor Motorsport	11	+7.267	1
15	1	(Netherlands) Giedo van der Garde	Signature Team	11	+7.690	21
16	27	(China) Ho-Pin Tung	Hitech Racing	11	+8.116	31
17	28	(Australia) Christian Jones	TME Racing	11	+8.505	22
18	33	(Hong Kong) Marchy Lee	Promatecme	11	+9.074	32
19	17	(Macau) Lei Kit Meng	Ombra Racing	11	+12.197	24
20	8	(United Kingdom) Jamie Green	ASM Formule 3	11	+12.235	5
21	31	(Macau) Jo Merszei	Swiss Racing Team	11	+14.040	25
22	5	(Japan) Naoki Yokomizo	Inging	10	+1 lap	15
23	15	(Japan) Katsuyuki Hiranaka	Prema Powerteam	10	+1 lap	13
Ret	32	(Japan) Daisuke Ikeda	Swiss Racing Team	8	Accident	18
Ret	20	(Macau) Rodolfo Ávila	Carlin Motorsport	8	Accident	29
Ret	29	(Macau) Michael Ho	TME Racing	8	Retired	23
Ret	16	(Italy) Matteo Cressoni	Ombra Racing	2	Brakes	20
Ret	6	(Germany) Nico Rosberg	Team Rosberg	1	Accident	2
Ret	18	(Portugal) Álvaro Parente	Carlin Motorsport	1	Accident	17
Ret	3	(United Kingdom) James Rossiter	Signature Team	0	Accident	9
Ret	2	(France) Loïc Duval	Signature Team	0	Accident	7
DNS	10	(France) Éric Salignon	ASM Formule 3	–	Did not start	–
Fastest lap: Robert Kubica, 2:12.527, 165.38 km/h (102.76 mph) on lap nine
