= Marcos Ambrose =

Australian racing driver (born 1976)

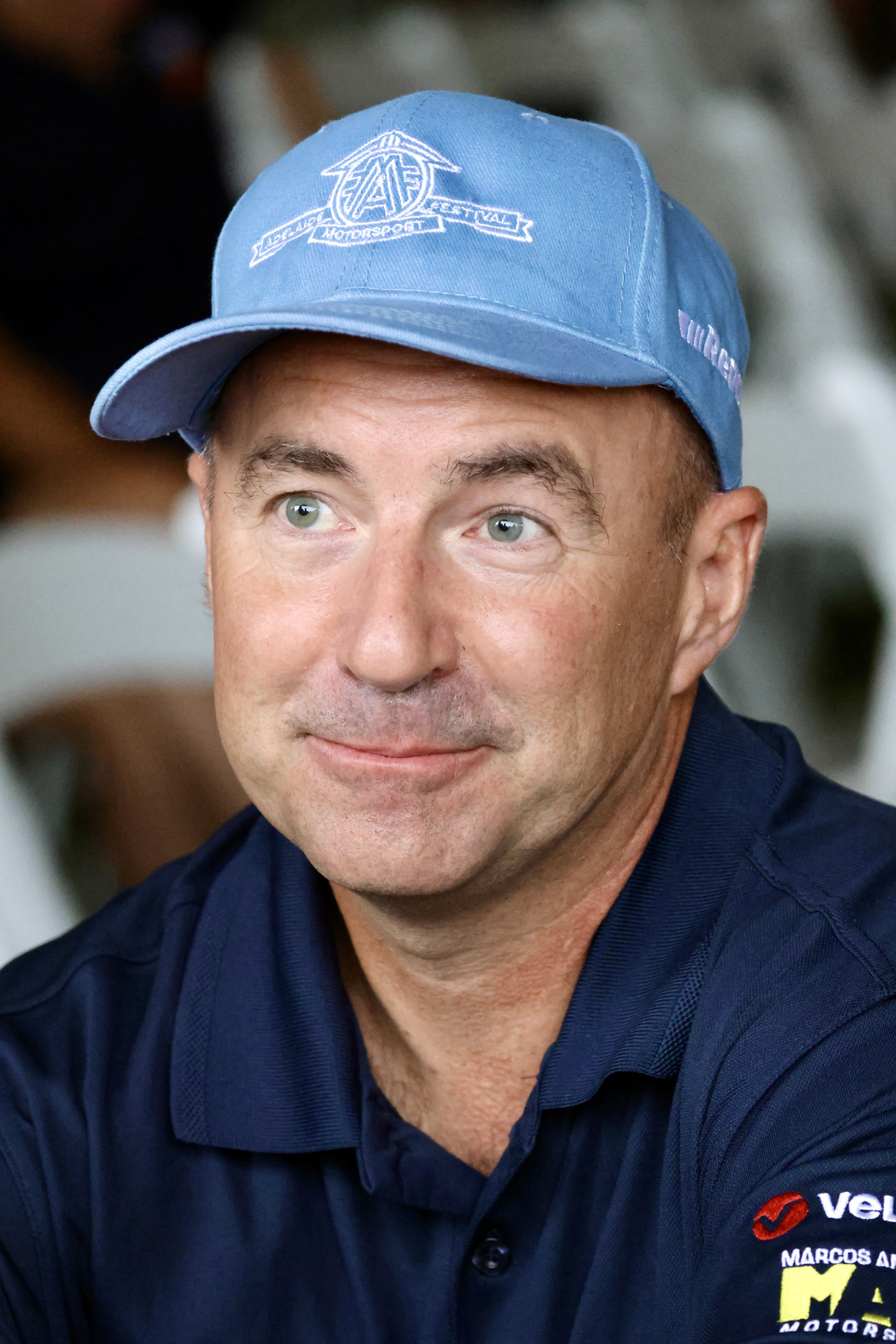
- Ambrose at the 2026 Adelaide Motorsport Festival
- Born: Marcos Ross Ambrose; 1 September 1976 (age 50); Launceston, Tasmania, Australia
- Spouse: Sonja Ambrose
- Children: 2
- Awards: Full list

Supercars Championship career
- Car number: 17
- Current team: DJR Team Penske
- Championships: 2 (2003, 2004)
- Races: 147
- Wins: 28
- Podiums: 66
- Pole positions: 18

NASCAR Cup Series career
- 227 races run over 7 years
- 2014 position: 23rd
- Best finish: 18th (2009, 2012)
- First race: 2008 Toyota/Save Mart 350 (Sonoma)
- Last race: 2014 Ford EcoBoost 400 (Homestead)
- First win: 2011 Heluva Good! Sour Cream Dips at The Glen (Watkins Glen)
- Last win: 2012 Finger Lakes 355 at The Glen (Watkins Glen)
Wins	Top tens	Poles
2	46	3

NASCAR O'Reilly Auto Parts Series career
- 77 races run over 7 years
- 2014 position: 85th
- Best finish: 8th (2007)
- First race: 2007 Orbitz 300 (Daytona)
- Last race: 2014 Zippo 200 at the Glen (Watkins Glen)
- First win: 2008 Zippo 200 at the Glen (Watkins Glen)
- Last win: 2014 Zippo 200 at the Glen (Watkins Glen)
Wins	Top tens	Poles
5	18	4

NASCAR FedEx Freight Truck Series career
- 22 races run over 1 year
- Best finish: 21st (2006)
- First race: 2006 Kroger 250 (Martinsville)
- Last race: 2006 Ford 200 (Homestead)
Wins	Top tens	Poles
0	4	1
- Statistics up to date as of 16 November 2014.

Marcos Ross Ambrose (born 1 September 1976) is an Australian former racing driver and current Garry Rogers Motorsport competition director. He won the Australian V8 Supercar series' championship in 2003 and 2004.

In 2006, Ambrose relocated to the United States to pursue racing in NASCAR, starting with the Craftsman Truck Series. He moved up to the Nationwide Series in 2007, and later the Sprint Cup Series in 2008. He is known in NASCAR for having won a total of six races at Watkins Glen International. In the Sprint Cup Series, he won at the Glen in 2011 and 2012, and in the Nationwide Series, he won at the Glen in 2008, 2009, 2010, and 2014. He is the first Australian driver to win in the highest level of NASCAR.

== Early life ==
Ambrose grew up in Launceston, Tasmania, Australia, the son of another racing driver, Ross Ambrose and was educated at Scotch Oakburn College. He began racing karts at the age of ten. He won four Tasmanian state junior karting titles and was the Australian karting champion in 1995 in the Clubman Heavy class at the Dubbo circuit in New South Wales. He moved into Formula Ford in 1996. Ambrose finished second in the Australian Formula Ford championship in 1997.

In 1998, Ambrose moved to Europe in a bid to reach Formula One, competing in British Formula Ford in 1998 and 1999. In 1999, he won the European Formula Ford Championship. In 2000, he began the season racing in the French Formula Three Championship, before switching mid-season to the British Formula Three Championship.

At the end of 2000. Ambrose did not have the budget to continue in racing in Europe, and returned to Australia. In October 2000, he was invited to compete in a Young Guns invitational race held at the Gold Coast Indy 300. Ambrose won against a host of young drivers in Honda road cars.

He also represented Australia in the 1996 EFDA Nations Cup at Donington Park in England.

== V8 Supercars ==
=== 2001–2005 ===
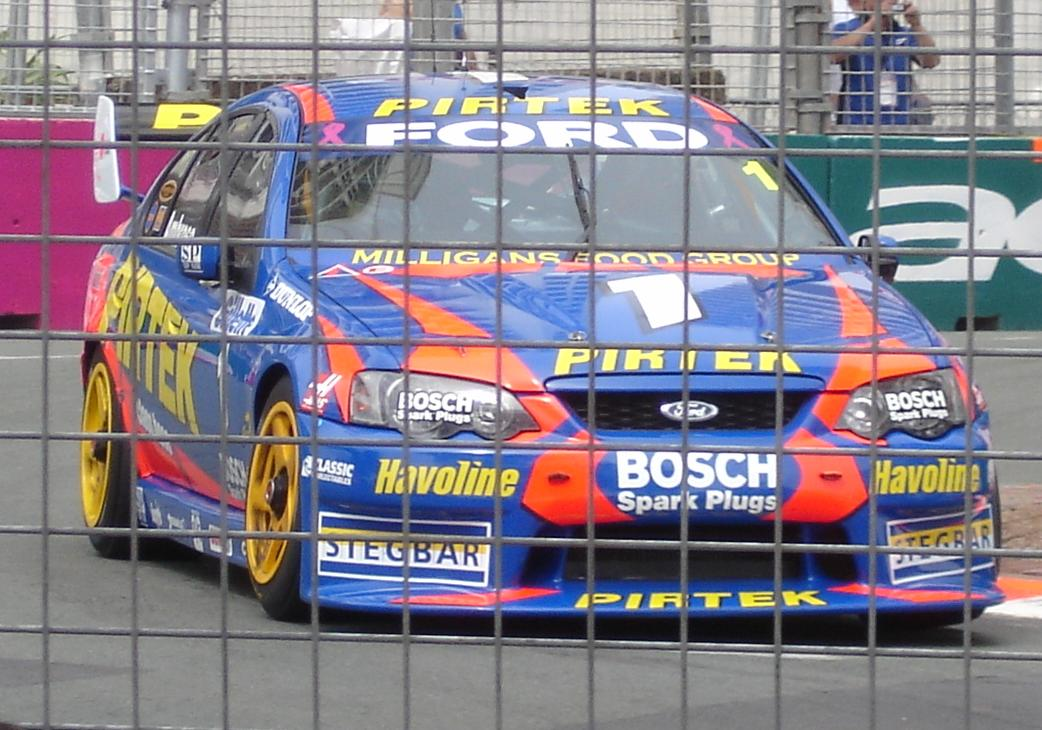
Ambrose in his Stone Brothers Racing Ford Falcon BA on the Surfers Paradise Street Circuit in October 2005

For 2001, Ambrose was signed by Stone Brothers Racing to drive a Ford Falcon AU. Ambrose stunned the Supercars Championship world when he qualified on pole on debut, at the Australian Grand Prix support race. He qualified on pole again for round three at Eastern Creek, round nine at Queensland Raceway and round 11, the Bathurst 1000, where he became the first rookie to take pole position since 1987.

Ambrose went on to finish eighth in the championship, winning the Rookie of the Year award. He won the fourth round of the season, at Hidden Valley Raceway, although he did not win any of the three races in the round.

In 2002, Ambrose started the season winning pole position at Phillip Island before recording his debut race win in the first race. He eventually finished third in the championship, including winning the final round at Sandown.

With a new Falcon BA, Ambrose gave the Ford team a great start to the 2003 season with victory in the first race of the Clipsal 500. He followed this up with a third career win at Eastern Creek. After thirteen rounds in the 2003 V8 Supercar Series, Ambrose was presented with the driver's series trophy, 102 points clear of second place.

In 2004, Ambrose claimed three pole positions and five round wins and went into the final round at Eastern Creek with a virtually unbeatable lead. In the end he collected his second championship in the opening Saturday night race and then went on to clean-sweep the round in record-breaking style in his Pirtek Falcon. Teammate Russell Ingall finished second in the championship, giving Stone Brothers Racing a 1–2 Quinella finish. The late part of the season was highlighted by an altercation between Ambrose and Rick Kelly when Ambrose appeared to have brake-checked Kelly on purpose after a race at the Gold Coast; Ambrose was fined $10,000 for careless driving.

Ambrose won the coveted Barry Sheene Medal in 2003 and 2004.

Ambrose started 2005 with a clean sweep of the opening round in Adelaide. He remained in the championship lead and was near to winning the championship until Round 10 at the Bathurst 1000 when he was involved in a controversial crash with Greg Murphy approaching The Cutting late in the race. The two drivers walked out and argued to applause from the fans. Both of them were infuriated with one another and shared words in exchanges. Murphy said about the altecation, "He's got an ego problem that we all know about and it reared its ugly head again, and I'm just not going to put up with it". Ambrose was quoted after the race was finished with his title hopes:

Greg's probably going to blame me, because he tends to blame everyone but himself for these kinds of incidents. I knew that I was already 99% past him, I gave him a car-length and a half to go two-wide up into The Cutting, and I just got clean wiped out.

— Marcos Ambrose, on a TV Interview after Bathurst 2005

This crash, combined with a poor performance on the Surfers Paradise Street Circuit possibly lost him a third straight title. He thereafter supported teammate Russell Ingall's title bid successfully, and the two helped Ford and Stone Brothers Racing take the Drivers, Teams, and Manufacturer's championships. Ambrose finished third in the championship behind Ingall and fellow Ford driver Craig Lowndes.

=== 2015 ===
In September 2014, it was announced that Ambrose would return to V8 Supercars to race a Ford Falcon FG X for DJR Team Penske, formed by NASCAR owner Roger Penske, who was interested in expanding his Team Penske organization to start a team in Australia and as a result merged with Dick Johnson Racing, becoming DJR Team Penske.

Ambrose started in 2015. He debuted at the final round of the 2014 season, driving the No. 66 Xbox-sponsored FG Falcon.

Ambrose began the 2015 season on a low note, starting near the back of the field in every one of the race. His best finish was twelfth in the third race at the Clipsal 500 in Adelaide.

In March 2015, Ambrose took a temporary leave from DJR Team Penske in order to improve his practice with V8 Supercar racing, being replaced with Scott Pye. He returned for the three-round Pirtek Endurance Cup as Pye's second driver, claiming an eighth finish at Surfers Paradise race 1.

Ambrose did not return as a full-season driver in 2016.

== NASCAR ==
=== 2006 ===
At the first V8 Supercar race of 2005, Ambrose called a press conference on the Saturday morning to announce to the top staff and fans that he would leave V8 Supercars at the end of the 2005 season to try to make a career in NASCAR.

In 2005, Ambrose signed his deal to compete under NASCAR and Ford Motor Company signed Ambrose to participate overseas in the United States with Wood Brothers/JTG Racing in the NASCAR Camping World Truck Series in 2006 to start his career. However, Ambrose had to wait until part way through the 2006 season to begin. NASCAR did not clear Ambrose to race the NCTS' first three races, as they were held on intermediate to high-speed ovals, and like fellow Wood Brothers/JTG Racing driver Bobby East, Ambrose was not cleared to start in the faster races. Ambrose made his Truck Series debut on 1 April 2006 at the Kroger 250 at Martinsville Speedway, qualifying 20th and finishing 33rd after being caught up in an incident unfolding in front of him.

Ambrose is the first notable Australian driver in a NASCAR sanctioned event since Dick Johnson in 1990 and Australian based New Zealander Jim Richards in the mid 90s.

Ambrose made history by finishing third in the O'Reilly Auto Parts 250 at Kansas Speedway on 2 July 2006. This was the first time a non-American driver has finished in the top five of a truck series event since Canadian Ron Fellows won on the Watkins Glen road course on 26 June 1999. He also took the lead in the opening laps, becoming the first Australian to lead laps in Camping World Truck Series competition. The next week, he made further history by scoring his first pole position for the Built Ford Tough 225 at Kentucky Speedway, and then leading the most laps in the race itself, though he finished 19th. Ambrose finished third in the Toyota Tundra 200 at Nashville Superspeedway after qualifying eleventh.

Ambrose reached as high as nineteenth in the championship points, but finished the season 21st overall and third in the Rookie of the Year standings, despite having missed the first three races of the year.

=== 2007–2010 ===
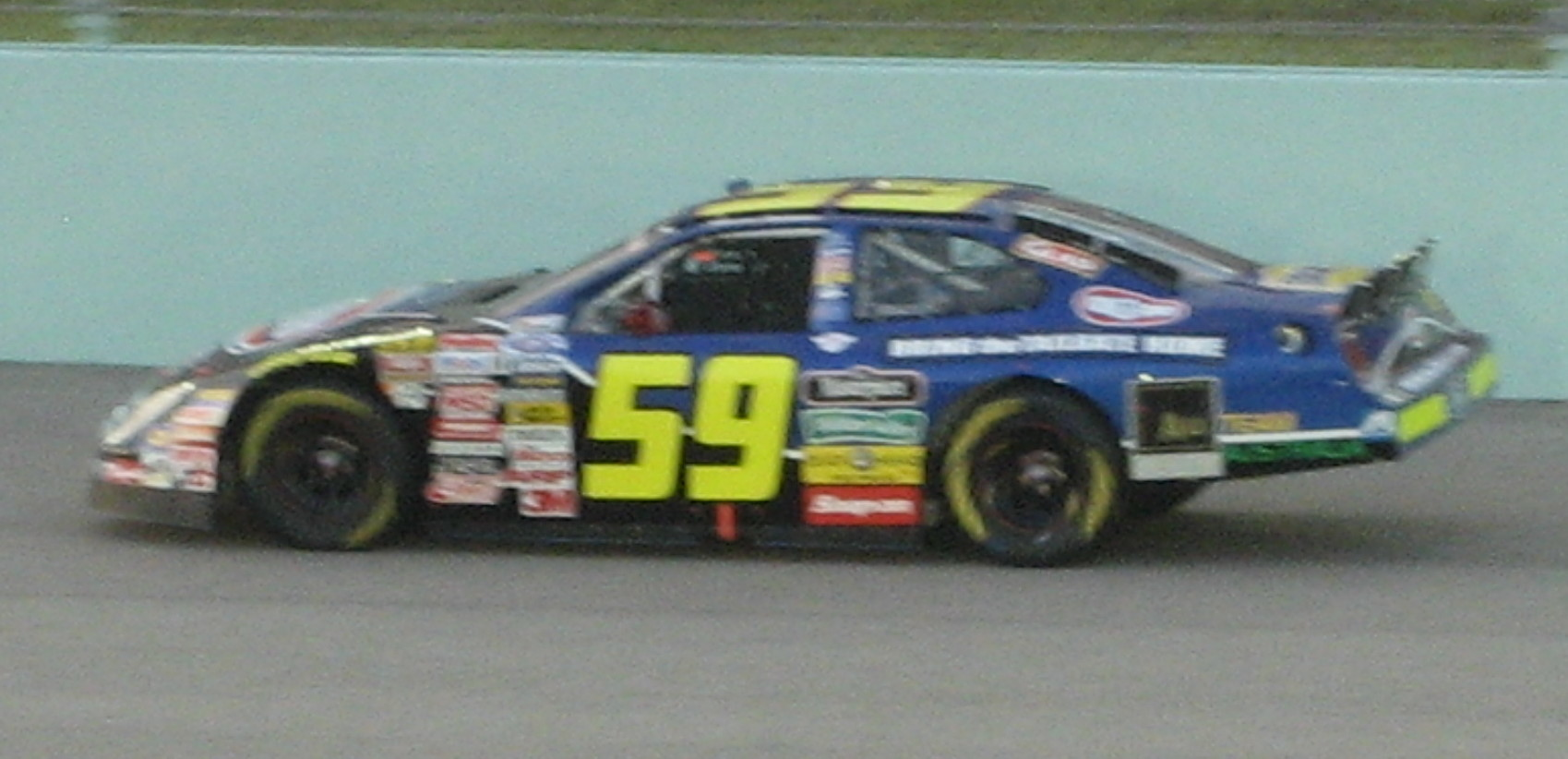
Marcos Ambrose during the 2007 Ford 300 at Homestead-Miami Speedway.

For 2007, Ambrose stepped up to the NASCAR Nationwide Series, driving the No. 59 Kingsford Ford Fusion fielded by Wood Brothers/JTG Racing. In the first two races of the 2007 season, he finished on the lead lap, in sixteenth and 25th, on tracks he had never previously raced on. In the third race of the season, the Telcel-Motorola México 200, Ambrose finished eighth, his career best at the time. having gained several positions in the last few laps of the race. He followed up his eighth place finish in Mexico City with another top-ten, finishing tenth in the Sam's Town 300 at Las Vegas. He recorded a career best Nationwide Series finish of sixth after starting third at Dover in May.

At the 2007 NAPA Auto Parts 200 Nationwide Series race at Circuit Gilles Villeneuve in Montreal, Ambrose was the dominant driver of the day, having led for 37 laps. After a caution period had finished, Ambrose had well-known Sprint Cup regular and Dakar Rally racer Robby Gordon behind him. At turn three, Gordon successfully made a pass on Ambrose and then the yellow flag came out. At the next corner, Ambrose rammed the left-rear of Gordon's car, spinning him out under yellow. Due to a caution being brought out earlier because of a large crash behind them, Gordon sped back behind Ambrose. During the caution, NASCAR officials declared that Ambrose was actually leading at the moment of caution (even though video footage appeared to show otherwise) and that Gordon had not maintained cautious pace by stopping in the middle of the race-track after the spin. Therefore, officials ordered Gordon to move back to fourteenth position for the oncoming restart, but he refused and was subsequently black-flagged. When they restarted with two laps to go, Gordon intentionally ran into the back of Ambrose at turn two, spinning him around. Although the win slipped away, Ambrose dropped down the field but recovered to finish in seventh. Following this incident, Gordon apologised and made a peace offering to Ambrose in the form of a ride for the Watkins Glen road race, in Gordon's No. 77 Camping World Ford Fusion. However, qualifying was rained out and the field was set by owner's points, and the No. 77 did not make the race.

In September, Ambrose skipped a second opportunity to drive the No. 77 car because his wife Sonja gave birth to their daughter Adelaide on the same day as the Cup race at Dover. Ambrose finished the 2007 season eighth in the points standings, highest of any driver not also competing in the Cup Series, and finished second behind David Ragan in the Rookie of the Year standings. On Sunday 20 April 2008 Ambrose was involved in a racing incident with Boris Said in the Busch Series event in Mexico. Ambrose admitted "getting into the back" of road course specialist, Said, causing Said to wreck and ruining his chances at a race where Said has consistently finished in the top-ten. After the race Said claimed that he was not mad at Ambrose, but wanted to apologise to (Ambrose's) crew chief, Gary Cogswell because it was going to "cost him a car," implying that Said will wreck Ambrose intentionally next time they find themselves on a NASCAR track together. Even though NASCAR said that Said just wrecked himself by getting loose, and that Ambrose has repeatedly apologised, in numerous subsequent public appearances, Said has not backed down in his threatening of Ambrose, at one point suggesting he would not apologise but preferred to "beat (Ambrose's) ass".

However, later that year at Watkins Glen when Ambrose was leading the NBNS race, in the final five laps he took the lead and with two laps left he raced behind the bumper of a lapped Said. Ambrose's crew chief Gary Cogswell ordered Ambrose to not pass Said believing that Said still had a grudge against them after Mexico City. The fans, Ambrose, his team and among other NASCAR drivers were surprised when Said did not commit his revenge before Ambrose later won the race. To this day Said has not explained why he did not crash Ambrose when he had a good chance and it still remains unknown why Said did not perform his revenge.

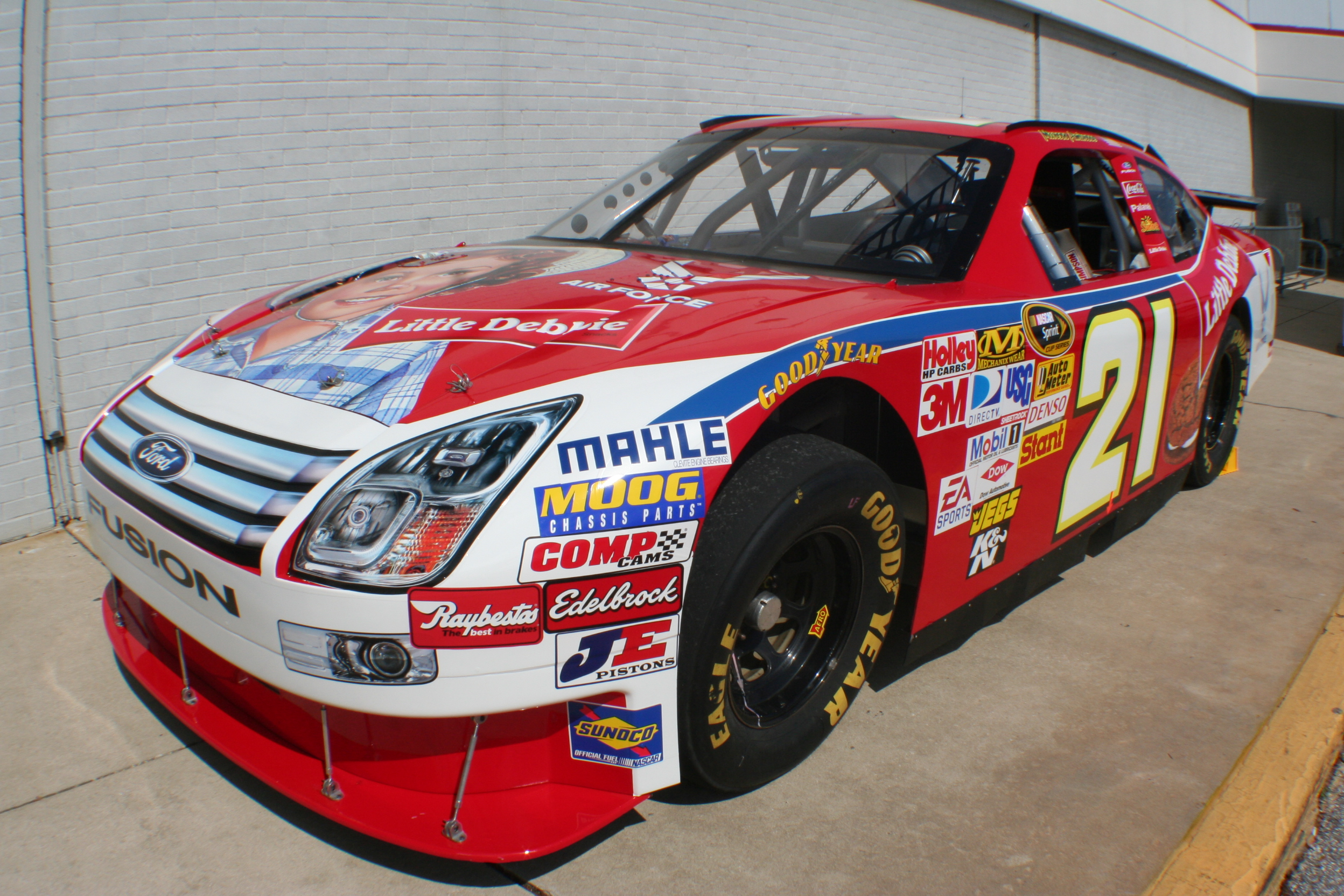
2008 No. 21 Sprint Cup car

Prior to the 2008 season, Wood Brothers Racing and JTG Racing split into two teams. Ambrose was scheduled to drive for both teams in Sprint Cup competition in 2008. He was going to run twelve races in the No. 21 car for the Wood Brothers and another four in the No. 47 car for JTG Racing. However, due to various issues he only ran 11 of the 16 planned races. He ran well in the Toyota-Save Mart 350 at Infineon, qualifying seventh out of 47 drivers and was running in the top three, but his No. 21 spun through the famous turn eleven hairpin and blowing his transmission, finishing a disappointing 42nd in the 43-car field. He attempted to make his second career Sprint Cup start in the Lenox Industrial Tools 301 at New Hampshire, but failed to qualify, qualifying 45 out of 45. Again, 43 cars would start, and again, he attempted to qualify the 21 car. He also drove the full Nationwide Series schedule.

He almost won the 2008 NAPA Auto Parts 200, dominating again like in 2007 but when a thunderstorm blew the track, Ambrose tried to slow for a pit stop. Nonetheless, his car slid across pit road too fast unable to stop because of the waters; thus he earned a black-flag for a pass-through penalty. He ended up third in the final results behind race winner Ron Fellows.

On 15 July 2008, it was announced that Ambrose would run the full 2009 cup schedule with JTG Racing with a new partnership with Brad Daugherty. The team was renamed JTG Daugherty Racing.

Ambrose got his first Nationwide Series win on 9 August 2008 in the Zippo 200 at Watkins Glen after his heartbreak at Montreal the previous week (See above). The next day, he finished third, after starting in 43rd position in the Centurion Boats at the Glen, behind winner Kyle Busch and Tony Stewart.

Ambrose drove the No. 47 Toyota in the 2009 NASCAR Sprint Cup series, after forming a technical alliance with Michael Waltrip Racing and Toyota Racing Development. Ambrose also drove the last 4 races of the 2008 Sprint Cup series in the No. 47 Toyota, after NASCAR agreed to change MWR's car number from No. 00 to No. 47. Ambrose entered Homestead with the No. 47 in the top-35, earning him a guaranteed start for the first time in his career. However, a bad finish at Homestead put the team back out of the top-35, so Ambrose would have been required to qualify on time for the first five races of 2009. Eventually, the team earned a top-35 exemption after a number of teams merged. Ambrose is ineligible for 2009 Rookie of the Year consideration because he ran 11 races in 2008. Ambrose finished tenth in the 2009 Food City 500, despite losing a cylinder with about one-hundred laps (fifty miles) to go. Ambrose would back this top-ten finish up by posting four more in the first half of the season. Ambrose got his second straight Nationwide Series win at Watkins Glen, his second in two years as he held off Kyle Busch for the win. He followed up with a second place in the Sprint Cup race at the Glen. The following week, Ambrose dominated the Nationwide race at Montreal, but on the final lap, he was passed by Carl Edwards when Ambrose jumped over the curb too high, and Carl Edwards zipped past him for the win. Ambrose picked up a top ten finish at the 2009 Sharpie 500. Ambrose charged hard from being one lap down with less than one-hundred laps left, to finish in third place behind Kyle Busch and Mark Martin.

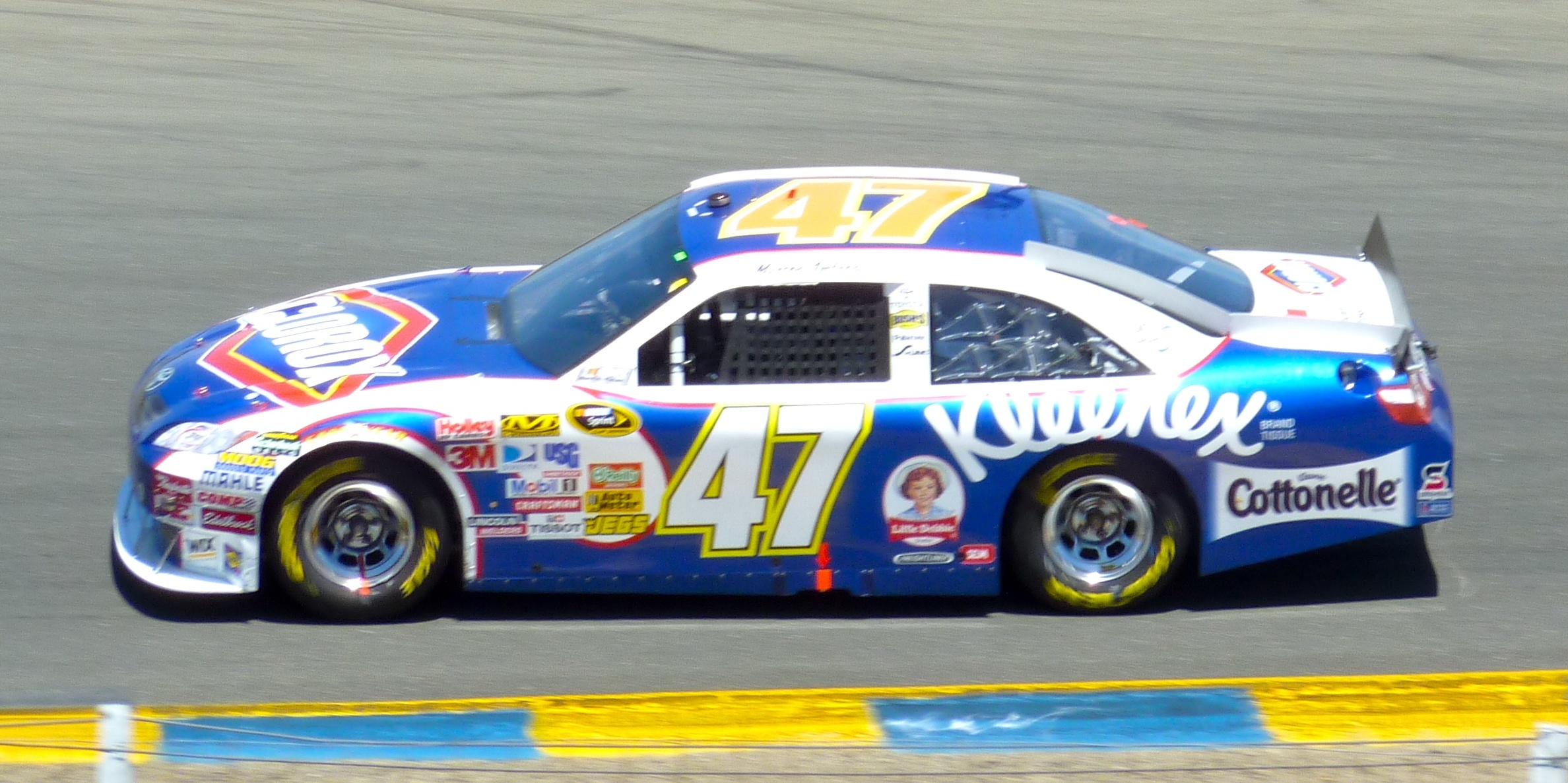
Ambrose's No. 47 car during the 2010 Toyota/Save Mart 350

The 2010 season was a myriad of troubles for Ambrose. Engine problems, unlucky crashes and pit road troubles plagued his racing season. However, in the Zippo 200 at The Glen, Ambrose won his third straight Watkins Glen he held off Joey Logano and Kevin Harvick to win. Since the win, he started to gain some form, recording a top-ten at Atlanta and a top-five at Richmond. At the Toyota/Save Mart 350 at Sonoma, Ambrose led 35 laps, and held a ten-second lead over Jimmie Johnson. His lead got erased by a caution on lap 104. During the caution, Ambrose turned off his car's engine to conserve fuel, but was unable to restart it. As a result, Ambrose attempted to return to his spot, but was forced to fall to seventh on the restart due to not maintaining a particular speed during the caution, and finished sixth. After the race, Ambrose stated, "I was leading the race and had trouble getting the motor cranked back up a little bit there, and NASCAR made the call. I was trying to save fuel and the motor shut off. It didn't recrank the way it should. I didn't stop rolling, but it is what it is."

=== 2011 ===
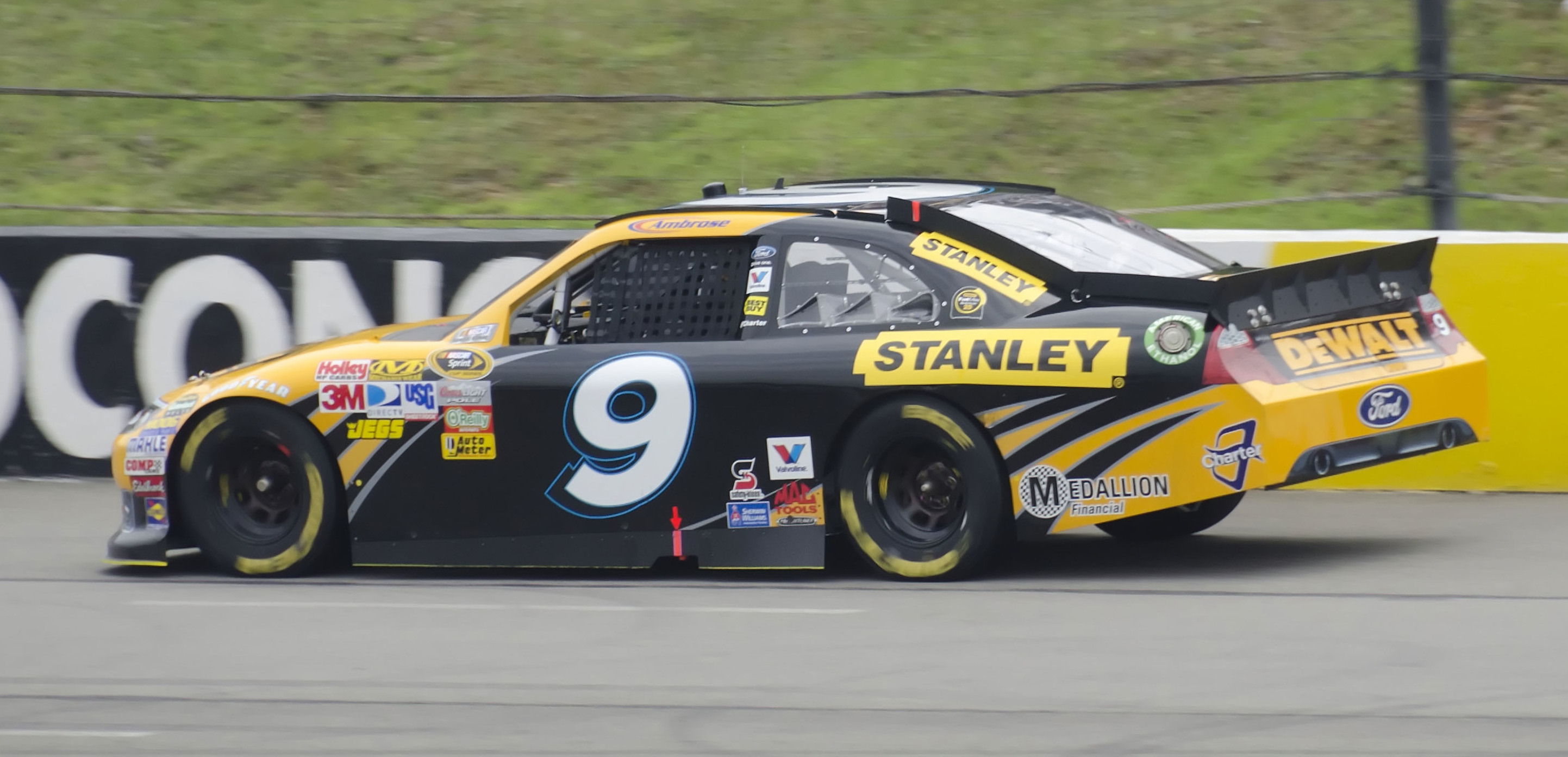
Ambrose's No. 9 car at Pocono Raceway in 2011

Ambrose announced on 17 August 2010 that he signed a multi-year deal with Richard Petty Motorsports to drive the #9 Stanley/DeWalt Power Tools Ford Fusion. He finished 37th in his first race with the team at the Daytona 500, after being crashed out of contention in a fifteen car wreck in turn three on lap 29. He did finish the race. He went on to have an impressive race at Phoenix running in the top-ten for most of the day. In August, Ambrose won the rain delayed Heluva Good! Sour Cream Dips at The Glen on 15 August to rack up his first career Sprint Cup Series win by passing Brad Keselowski and Kyle Busch with two laps to go. Ambrose further vindicated his road course abilities, backing up under a week later by taking an emotional victory at Montreal in the Nationwide Series, during the NAPA Auto Parts 200. The 2011 season continued to be his career best as he recorded five top-five and twelve top-ten finishes. Ambrose finished the 2011 season nineteenth in the final point standings.

=== 2012 ===
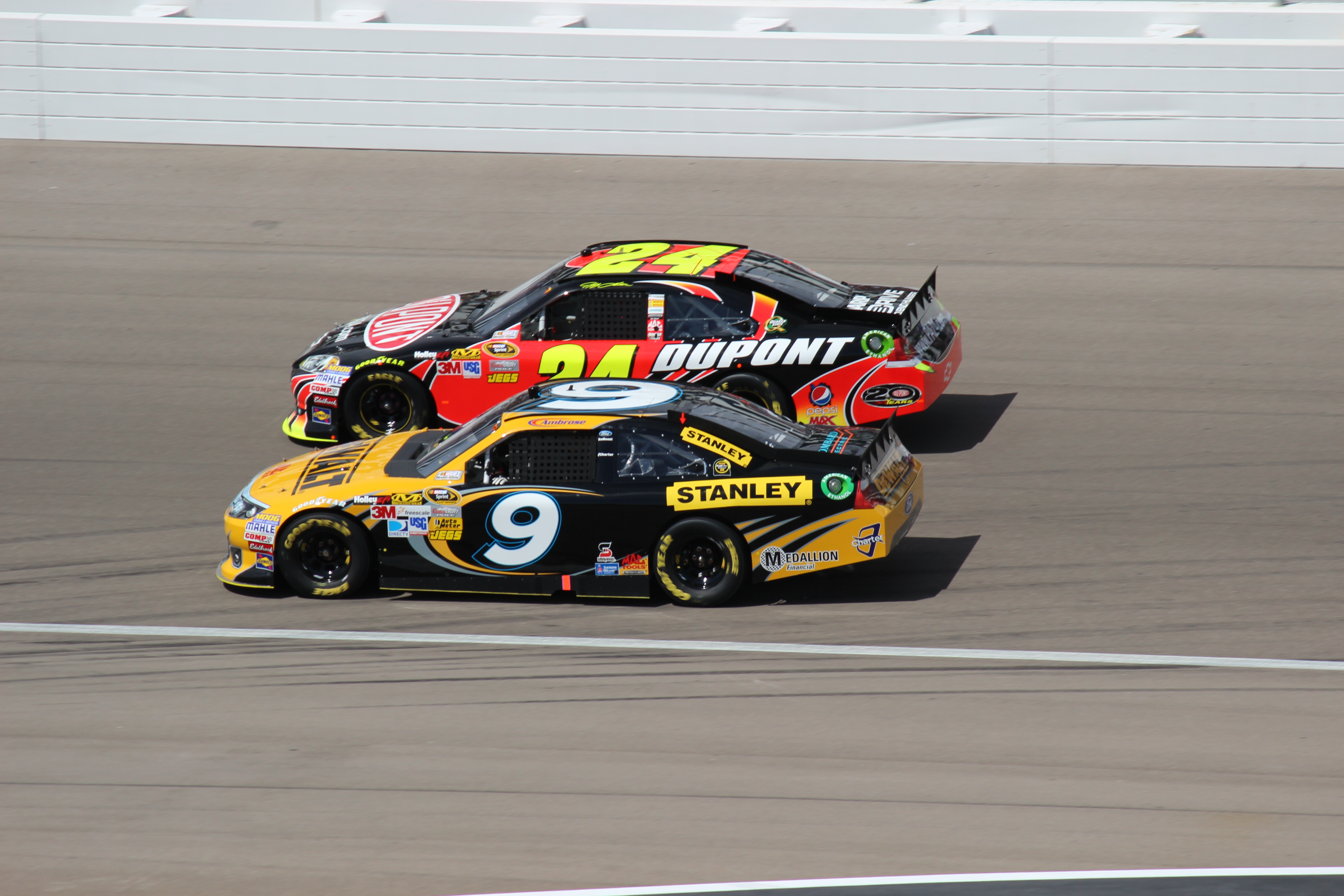
Ambrose (9) battling Jeff Gordon in the 2012 Kobalt Tools 400

Ambrose returned to Richard Petty Motorsports for 2012. In February he almost won the Budweiser Shootout with bump-drafting help from Keselowski; but lost the lead just as he took the white flag to Tony Stewart and eventual race winner Kyle Busch. Ambrose said after the race that despite losing the Shootout the race was his best performance on a restrictor plate track (although he also had several top-tens at previous plate races, such as a 4th-place finish at Talladega in the spring 2009 race).

Ambrose started the season with a thirteenth place finish in the Daytona 500, and in the spring races, collected six top-twenty finishes and two top-ten finishes. In June, he posted the fastest qualifying speed in NASCAR competition in 25 years, winning his first career Sprint Cup pole in the Quicken Loans 400 at Michigan International Speedway at a speed of 203.241 miles per hour (327.085 km/h), the third fastest pole speed ever in NASCAR. Ambrose finished ninth in that race.

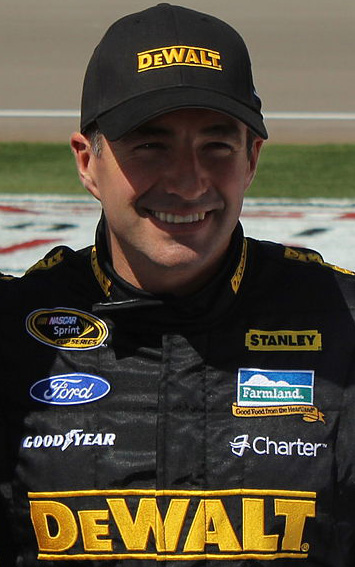
Ambrose at Las Vegas Motor Speedway in 2012

The following week, Ambrose won the pole at Infineon Raceway but only led about ten laps before he had to pit thus putting him in the top-ten for the rest of the day. He finished eighth.

Returning to Watkins Glen, Ambrose started fifth and dominated part of the race but was passed in a three-wide move by Kyle Busch with twenty laps remaining. When the white flag was about to wave he saw that Busch was slipping in oil; in the entrance to the esses he and Brad Keselowski passed him; Ambrose then saw that Keselowski was slipping in oil too and he took the lead in the final turn, holding off Keselowski for the second time in a row and defending his win from the previous year. Ambrose was very emotional about his win due to his father seeing it on television in a hospital for an illness and due to his luck that day. The win moved Ambrose up one position in the standings from eighteenth to seventeenth. Ambrose still has promised the racing world for a future oval win since his #1 goal currently is to prove he can win at places other than road courses.

His victory caused local company Mac Tools to offer Ambrose multi-year sponsorship which Ambrose's boss, Richard Petty, approved of. Mac Tools sponsored Ambrose in a few races for 2012 and throughout 2013.

=== 2013 ===
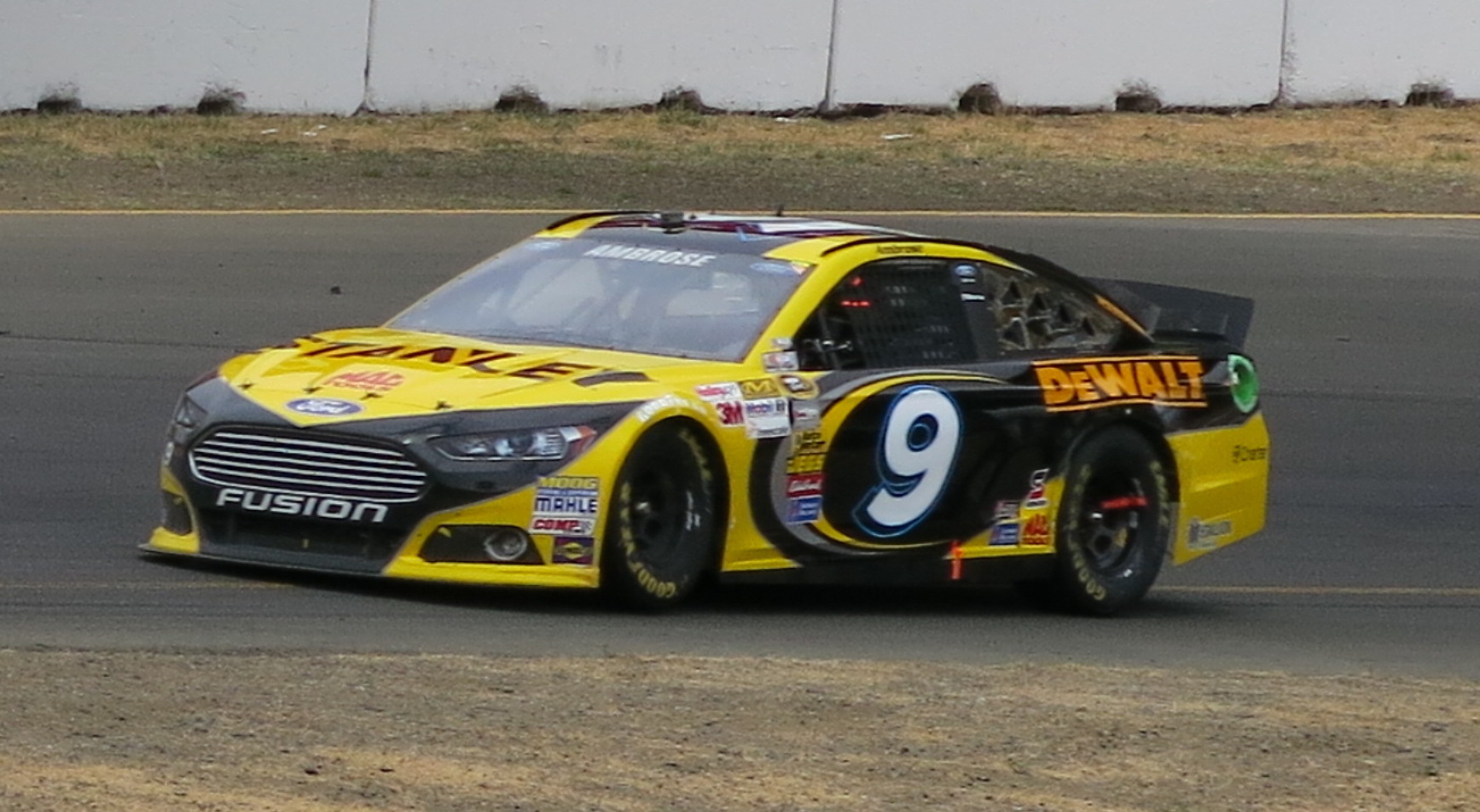
Ambrose during the 2013 Toyota/Save Mart 350

To start the 2013 season, Ambrose had eleventh place finishes in both the Sprint Unlimited and the Budweiser Duel. Ambrose drove in the top ten for a part of the Daytona 500 but when Kevin Harvick, Kasey Kahne and Tony Stewart crashed out of the race, Ambrose slowed down to avoid being involved in the accident, causing him to drive for the rest of the race further back in the field. He finished in eighteenth place. He recorded another eighteenth place finish at Phoenix and a 22nd place finish at Las Vegas.

Ambrose was on his way to a good finish in the NRA 500 at Texas Motor Speedway before crashing with Jeff Burton and finishing a lap down. Then, a couple weeks later he had a frustrating day at Richmond International Raceway when his engine failed early and he finished 42nd. He recovered for a 14th-place finish at Talladega, one of his top 2013 finishes.

In the Coca-Cola 600, Ambrose reached a top-ten spot in an unusual style. On the final lap, Carl Edwards was about to hold off Ambrose for the tenth position, but got loose in the final turn to the finish line, causing Ambrose to slip by to steal the tenth spot and lock Edwards out of the top ten finishers. This fight for tenth place resembled a reverse style of Ambrose's race at Montreal in 2009, which ended with Edwards getting by him on the final lap.

At Sonoma, Ambrose led the first laps of the race getting by pole-sitter Jamie McMurray at the start of the race. He finished in seventh place. At Loudon, Ambrose fought Harvick in the opening laps for a top-ten spot. In a corner, Harvick rammed Ambrose's right rear causing Ambrose to spin out; he would finish in 33rd.

At Watkins Glen, Ambrose won the pole after breaking the track record with a lap speed of 128.241 mph (206.384 km/h), breaking the previous record held by Juan Pablo Montoya's speed of 127.020 mph (204.419 km/h). Ambrose led 51 laps but on lap sixty, he pitted under caution. He restarted in fifteenth and never recovered. With three laps left while running in eighth place Ambrose tangled with road-course rival Max Papis, ending his hopes to win three races in a row at the Glen. Ambrose was visibly upset with Papis in the aftermath, furiously tossing his steering wheel at the in-car camera, tossing his helmet hard through his window, and pointing his finger at Papis when Papis came by under caution. Ambrose finished 31st. Had he won, Ambrose would have joined Jeff Gordon and Mark Martin as the only drivers in NASCAR history to win three consecutive races at the Glen.

Ambrose made a Nationwide Series return at the Mid-Ohio Sports Car Course's Nationwide Children's Hospital 200. Ambrose had to start in the back as he did not qualify the car. Ambrose made it up to third, but was then spun out numerous times, falling to sixteenth. He rallied to finish in seventh place but was spun out by Parker Kligerman after the checkered flag for previous contact during the race.

=== 2014 ===
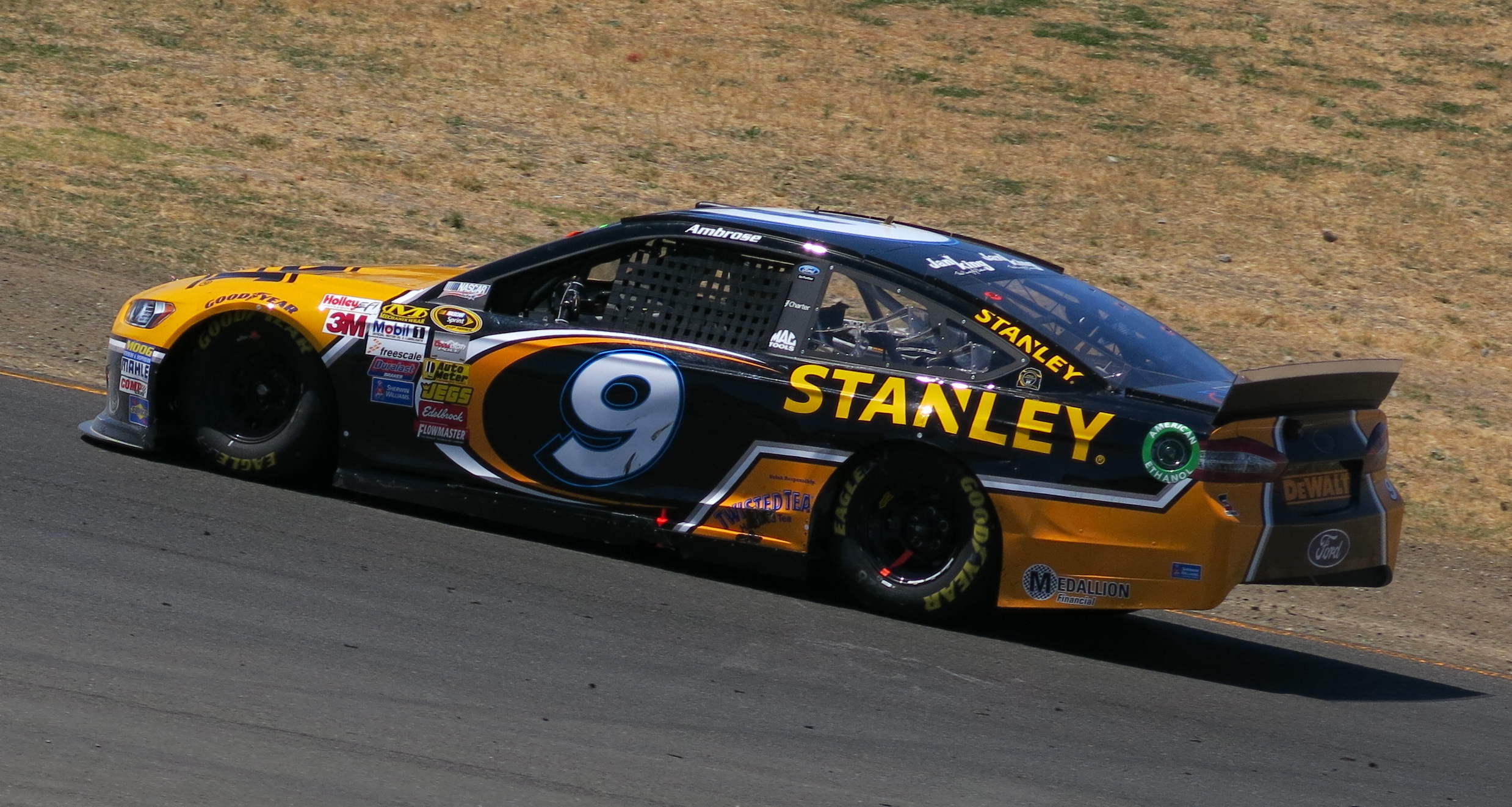
Ambrose during the 2014 Toyota/Save Mart 350

Ambrose started with a seventh-place finish in the Sprint Unlimited, and an eighteenth place finish in the Daytona 500. He then had 21st and 24th place finishes at Phoenix and Las Vegas. At Bristol, Ambrose finished fifth in what was statistically one of Richard Petty Motorsports' best races to date, as teammate Aric Almirola finished third. It was Ambrose's first top-five finish in a race since the 2012 Irwin Tools Night Race.

At Richmond, Ambrose was running in the top five of the Richmond 400. While racing Casey Mears mid-way into the race, Ambrose was bumped wide by Mears that lost Ambrose multiple positions. The two drivers confronted each other post race, which saw Ambrose land a punch into Mears' face after Mears was seen pushing Ambrose. Ambrose was fined $25,000 and Mears $15,000 for the altercation. Both drivers were placed on probation for one month. Despite the feud, both Casey and Marcos said they remain buddies and will "have a beer together" with Ambrose promising to buy.

Ambrose finished 10th at Daytona for a top-ten finish while his teammate Aric Almirola won the race when rain had shortened the event.

Ambrose returned to the Nationwide Series at Watkins Glen in the No. 09. Ambrose dominated the race and won his 5th Nationwide victory holding off Kyle Busch in a performance reminiscent of 2009. The next day Ambrose started second and after leading some laps, came up short after a side-by-side battle with former teammate A. J. Allmendinger who beat Ambrose by 1.5 seconds after accelerating away from Ambrose on the final lap. Ambrose's crew chief Drew Blickensderfer protested the finish by saying that Allmendinger jumped the restart, but NASCAR officials and Ambrose both denied this, Ambrose saying "The restart had no influence on the outcome. We just raced and he won."

Ambrose missed the Chase for the Sprint Cup and on 11 September 2014 said he did not expect to be back with Richard Petty Motorsports in 2015. This was soon after sponsor Stanley-DEWALT pulled out of RPM to join Carl Edwards' car at Joe Gibbs Racing but it is unknown if Ambrose's decision to depart had anything to do with Stanley-DEWALT pulling out their sponsorship of the 9 team. Not long after it was announced that Ambrose would be returning to Australia after the 2014 NASCAR season ends for what Ambrose and Petty described as "personal reasons."

In September 2014, Ambrose confirmed he would leave RPM and NASCAR at the end of the 2014 season with a purpose to return to Australia. Ambrose stated that it was for both personal reasons for his children and because he had accepted an offer to join DJR Team Penske, co-owned by NASCAR owner Roger Penske.

When asked about his departure from NASCAR Ambrose stated: "I think I've accomplished all I can accomplish in NASCAR. When I came it was clear all I could do was win races and not have any chance at a championship. I've enjoyed my time here and I will miss my friends and the other drivers very much but this move is done mostly to help my children get raised in our native country and I feel like I want to start a new chapter in my life. I'm glad to leave with multiple wins in NASCAR and having raced for the King."

In his final NASCAR race, the 2014 Ford EcoBoost 400, Ambrose qualified seventeenth. He struggled with a poor-handling car, and hit the wall on lap 195, but managed to finish 27th and on the lead lap.

== Post-racing career ==
In a 2017 interview, two years after his abrupt retirement, a journalist for Motorsport.com interviewed Ambrose about the retirement, at his brand-new Lodge near Launceston. In the interview, Ambrose said that the ultimate reason was that, "My time was up," and that he was "Putting the team first" in making his decision to step aside from the car after only two races.

During the interview, Ambrose stated,

"The deal with Roger and Team Penske and Dick, it was really formulated a year and a half beforehand where a conversation occurs you say 'if you ever did that Roger I'd love to drive for you', and you kind of leave it at that. And then a year and a half later the phone call comes and it's on. And it's like 'oh shit, is this really what I should be doing now? Because I'm feeling pretty tired and worn out from my American thing'. I thought it'd be right, I'd come home and it'd work itself out. And then the situation that DJR was in at the time, where they were in this transition phase – and they still are, they're getting better and better each race, you can see their progression, but it takes time. I knew it. So when you come back, and I'm struggling to adapt from NASCAR back into a modern V8, the testing restrictions, and the tires are hard, and I'm confused and tired from the States … and then you see 'Fuck, to get out of this is going to take three years, to dig yourself out of this hole'. And I realised that I'm not the right person for that team in the phase that they're in. I need to get out of the way. And that's what I did."

In an interview with the same journalist for Motorsport.com, Roger Penske said,

"It was a call that he made and we supported him; he was very gracious in the way he handled it, and quite honestly I respect him. It reminded me of Rick Mears when he told me in 1992 that he didn't have it in his belly any more to go as hard as he needed to, and that it was time to move on. Marcos didn't say it that way, but he realized the sport had moved on and maybe he was not able to make the commitment we needed over a longer period of time".

Ambrose made a brief return to racing at the 2023 Bathurst 6 Hour, which is part of the Bathurst Motor Festival held during the Easter weekend. He raced as a co-driver alongside George Miedecke and Tim Brook in the number 33 Ford Mustang. He retired from the race after the Mustang's 10-speed automatic transmission failed after two hours into the race.

== Personal life ==
Ambrose is from Launceston, Australia. The Ambrose family have a rich history in formula racing as Marcos' father Ross Ambrose, along with Ralph Firman Sr, co-founded Formula Ford chassis builder Van Diemen; Ross is also an Australian investor in Ford who was born in London before moving to Australia when he was three.

Ambrose is married to Sonja Ambrose and has two daughters named Adelaide and Tabitha.

In 2023, Ambrose was diagnosed with Stage IV colorectal cancer. He underwent a liver transplant, just the third Australian in history to have such a procedure with that cancer level.

== Awards and honours ==
On 24 October 2000, Ambrose was awarded the Australian Sports Medal for his motor racing achievements.

At the Supercars End of Season 2025 awards night, Ambrose was inducted in the Supercars Hall of Fame.

== Motorsports career results ==
=== Career summary ===
Season	Series	Position	Car	Team
1996	Australian Formula Ford Championship	4th	Swift SC95K Ford	Swift Racing Cars
1996	EFDA Nations Cup	8th	Van Diemen – Opel	Team Australia
1997	Australian Formula Ford Championship	**2nd**	Van Diemen RF97 Ford	Marcos Ambrose
1998	British Formula Ford Championship	5th	Van Diemen RF98 Ford	Van Diemen
1999	British Formula Ford Championship	**3rd**	Van Diemen RF99 Ford	Van Diemen
1999	Formula Ford EuroCup	**1st**	Van Diemen RF99 Ford	Van Diemen
2000	French Formula Three Championship	12th	Martini Mk.79 Sodemo-Renault	Mygale
2000	British Formula Three Championship	16th	Dallara F300 Mugen-Honda	Alan Docking Racing
2001	Shell Championship Series	8th	Ford AU Falcon	Stone Brothers Racing
2002	V8 Supercar Championship Series	**3rd**	Ford AU Falcon	Stone Brothers Racing
2003	V8 Supercar Championship Series	**1st**	Ford BA Falcon	Stone Brothers Racing
2004	V8 Supercar Championship Series	**1st**	Ford BA Falcon	Stone Brothers Racing
2005	V8 Supercar Championship Series	**3rd**	Ford BA Falcon	Stone Brothers Racing
2006	NASCAR Craftsman Truck Series	21st	Ford F-150	Wood Brothers/JTG Racing
2007	NASCAR Busch Series	8th	Ford Fusion	Wood Brothers/JTG Racing
2008	NASCAR Nationwide Series	10th	Ford Fusion	JTG Daugherty Racing
2008	NASCAR Sprint Cup Series	45th	Ford Fusion; Toyota Camry	Wood Brothers Racing; JTG Daugherty Racing; Michael Waltrip Racing
2009	NASCAR Sprint Cup Series	18th	Toyota Camry	JTG Daugherty Racing
2009	NASCAR Nationwide Series	77th	Toyota Camry	JTG Daugherty Racing
2010	NASCAR Sprint Cup Series	26th	Toyota Camry	JTG Daugherty Racing
2010	NASCAR Nationwide Series	81st	Toyota Camry	JTG Daugherty Racing
2011	NASCAR Sprint Cup Series	19th	Ford Fusion	Richard Petty Motorsports
2012	NASCAR Sprint Cup Series	18th	Ford Fusion	Richard Petty Motorsports
2013	NASCAR Sprint Cup Series	22nd	Ford Fusion	Richard Petty Motorsports
2014	NASCAR Sprint Cup Series	23rd	Ford Fusion	Richard Petty Motorsports
2015	International V8 Supercars Championship	43rd	Ford FG X Falcon	DJR Team Penske

=== International V8 Supercars Championship ===
Supercars results
Year	Team	No.	Car	1	2	3	4	5	6	7	8	9	10	11	12	13	14	15	16	17	18	19	20	21	22	23	24	25	26	27	28	29	30	31	32	33	34	35	36	37	38	Position	Points
2001	Stone Brothers Racing	4	Ford AU Falcon	PHI; R1; 4	PHI; R2; 6	ADE; R3; Ret	ADE; R4; 6	**EAS**; **R5**; 13	EAS; R6; 6	HDV; R7; 2	HDV; R8; 4	HDV; R9; 3	CAN; R10; Ret	CAN; R11; 2	CAN; R12; Ret	BAR; R13; 18	BAR; R14; 16	BAR; R15; 24	CAL; R16; 3	CAL; R17; 5	CAL; R18; 9	ORA; R19; 16	ORA; R20; Ret	**QLD**; **R21**; Ret	WIN; R22; 5	WIN; R23; 3	**BAT**; **R24**; Ret	PUK; R25; 2	PUK; R26; 3	PUK; R27; 4	SAN; R28; 6	SAN; R29; 5	SAN; R30; 2									8th	2086
2002	Stone Brothers Racing	4	Ford AU Falcon	ADE; R1; 3	ADE; R2; Ret	**PHI**; **R3**; 1	**PHI**; **R4**; Ret	EAS; R5; 2	EAS; R6; 2	EAS; R7; 4	HDV; R8; 3	HDV; R9; 9	HDV; R10; 5	CAN; R11; 4	CAN; R12; 6	**CAN**; **R13**; 20	BAR; R14; 6	BAR; R15; 24	BAR; R16; 10	**ORA**; **R17**; 4	ORA; R18; 2	**WIN**; **R19**; 2	WIN; R20; 4	**QLD**; **R21**; 5	BAT; R22; 21	SUR; R23; 2	SUR; R24; Ret	PUK; R25; 3	PUK; R26; 3	PUK; R27; 10	**SAN**; **R28**; 1	**SAN**; **R29**; 1										3rd	1498
2003	Stone Brothers Racing	4	Ford BA Falcon	ADE; R1; 1	**ADE**; **R1**; Ret	PHI; R3; 17	**EAS**; **R4**; 1	**WIN**; **R5**; 1	BAR; R6; 3	BAR; R7; 2	BAR; R8; 1	HDV; R9; 2	HDV; R10; 1	**HDV**; **R11**; 1	**QLD**; **R12**; 2	**ORA**; **R13**; 1	**SAN**; **R14**; 5	BAT; R15; 6	SUR; R16; 6	SUR; R17; 4	PUK; R18; 6	PUK; R19; 23	PUK; R20; 9	EAS; R21; 1	**EAS**; **R22**; 1																	1st	2085
2004	Stone Brothers Racing	1	Ford BA Falcon	ADE; R1; 1	**ADE**; **R2**; 1	**EAS**; **R3**; 7	PUK; R4; 1	**PUK**; **R5**; 3	PUK; R6; 3	HDV; R7; 3	HDV; R8; 13	HDV; R9; 2	BAR; R10; 3	BAR; R11; 4	BAR; R12; 3	**QLD**; **R13**; 1	WIN; R14; 26	ORA; R15; 2	ORA; R16; 1	SAN; R17; 1	BAT; R18; 4	SUR; R19; 1	**SUR**; **R20**; 2	SYM; R21; 2	SYM; R22; 1	**SYM**; **R23**; Ret	**EAS**; **R24**; 1	**EAS**; **R25**; 1	**EAS**; **R26**; 1													1st	2174
2005	Stone Brothers Racing	1	Ford BA Falcon	ADE; R1; 1	**ADE**; **R2**; 1	PUK; R3; 5	PUK; R4; 3	PUK; R5; 4	BAR; R6; 2	BAR; R7; 5	BAR; R8; 3	EAS; R9; 1	**EAS**; **R10**; 2	SHA; R11; 5	SHA; R12; 4	SHA; R13; 12	HDV; R14; 4	HDV; R15; 28	HDV; R16; 9	**QLD**; **R17**; 2	**ORA**; **R18**; 4	ORA; R19; 2	SAN; R20; 14	BAT; R21; Ret	SUR; R22; Ret	SUR; R23; 26	SUR; R24; 11	SYM; R25; 4	SYM; R26; 27	SYM; R27; 6	PHI; R28; 3	PHI; R29; 1	**PHI**; **R30**; 1									3rd	1856
2014	Dick Johnson Racing	66	Ford FG Falcon	ADE; R1	ADE; R2	ADE; R3	SYM; R4	SYM; R5	SYM; R6	WIN; R7	WIN; R8	WIN; R9	PUK; R10	PUK; R11	PUK; R12	PUK; R13	BAR; R14	BAR; R15	BAR; R16	HID; R17	HID; R18	HID; R19	TOW; R20	TOW; R21	TOW; R22	QLD; R23	QLD; R24	QLD; R25	SMP; R26	SMP; R27	SMP; R28	SAN; R29	BAT; R30	SUR; R31	SUR; R32	PHI; R33	PHI; R34	PHI; R35	SYD; R36; 20	SYD; R37; 21	SYD; R38; 16	NC	0^{1}
2015	DJR Team Penske	17	Ford FG X Falcon	ADE; R1; 16	ADE; R2; 16	ADE; R3; 12	SYM; R4	SYM; R5	SYM; R6	BAR; R7	BAR; R8	BAR; R9	WIN; R10	WIN; R11	WIN; R12	HID; R13	HID; R14	HID; R15	TOW; R16	TOW; R17	QLD; R18	QLD; R19	QLD; R20	SMP; R21	SMP; R22	SMP; R23	SAN; R24; 12	BAT; R25; Ret	SUR; R26; 8	SUR; R27; 21	PUK; R28	PUK; R29	PUK; R30	PHI; R31	PHI; R32	PHI; R33	SYD; R34	SYD; R35	SYD; R36			43rd	395

^{1} Wildcard entry ineligible for championship points

=== Complete Bathurst 1000 results ===
Year	Team	Car	Co-driver	Position	Laps
2001	Stone Brothers Racing	Ford Falcon AU	(Australia) Wayne Wakefield	DNF	42
2002	Stone Brothers Racing	Ford Falcon AU	(Australia) Paul Weel	21st	154
2003	Stone Brothers Racing	Ford Falcon BA	(Australia) Russell Ingall	6th	161
2004	Stone Brothers Racing	Ford Falcon BA	(Australia) Greg Ritter	4th	161
2005	Stone Brothers Racing	Ford Falcon BA	(Australia) Warren Luff	DNF	144
2015	DJR Team Penske	Ford Falcon FG X	(Australia) Scott Pye	DNF	137

=== NASCAR ===
(key) (Bold – Pole position awarded by qualifying time. Italics – Pole position earned by points standings or practice time. * – Most laps led.)

==== Sprint Cup Series ====
NASCAR Sprint Cup Series results
Year	Team	No.	Make	1	2	3	4	5	6	7	8	9	10	11	12	13	14	15	16	17	18	19	20	21	22	23	24	25	26	27	28	29	30	31	32	33	34	35	36	NSCC	Pts	Ref
2007	Robby Gordon Motorsports	77	Ford	DAY	CAL	LVS	ATL	BRI	MAR	TEX	PHO	TAL	RCH	DAR	CLT	DOV	POC	MCH	SON	NHA	DAY	CHI	IND	POC	GLN; DNQ	MCH	BRI	CAL	RCH	NHA	DOV	KAN	TAL	CLT	MAR	ATL	TEX	PHO	HOM	NA	-	
2008	Wood Brothers Racing	21	Ford	DAY	CAL	LVS	ATL	BRI	MAR	TEX	PHO	TAL	RCH	DAR	CLT	DOV	POC	MCH	SON; 42	NHA; DNQ	DAY	CHI			GLN; 3	MCH; 43	BRI	CAL; 32	RCH	NHA	DOV; 32									45th	844	
2008	JTG Racing	47	Ford																				IND; 22	POC								KAN; 36	TAL	CLT	MAR					45th	844	
2008	Michael Waltrip Racing	47	Toyota																																	ATL; 29	TEX; 21	PHO; 18	HOM; 42	45th	844	
2009	JTG Daugherty Racing	47	Toyota	DAY; 17	CAL; 22	LVS; 20	ATL; 38	BRI; 10	MAR; 14	TEX; 41	PHO; 14	TAL; 4	RCH; 11	DAR; 33	CLT; 26	DOV; 20	POC; 6	MCH; 31	SON; 3	NHA; 23	DAY; 6	CHI; 11	IND; 22	POC; 34	GLN; 2	MCH; 35	BRI; 3	ATL; 23	RCH; 22	NHA; 20	DOV; 14	KAN; 14	CAL; 23	CLT; 22	MAR; 27	TAL; 34	TEX; 15	PHO; 11	HOM; 35	18th	3830	
2010	JTG Daugherty Racing	47	Toyota	DAY; 41	CAL; 35	LVS; 14	ATL; 11	BRI; 33	MAR; 11	PHO; 11	TEX; 17	TAL; 37	RCH; 9	DAR; 25	DOV; 36	CLT; 36	POC; 30	MCH; 15	SON; 6	NHA; 13	DAY; 32	CHI; 28	IND; 21	POC; 39	GLN; 3	MCH; 15	BRI; 20	ATL; 10	RCH; 5	NHA; 30	DOV; 20	KAN; 34	CAL; 33	CLT; 16	MAR; 34	TAL; 34	TEX; 12	PHO; 22	HOM; 26	26th	3422	
2011	Richard Petty Motorsports	9	Ford	DAY; 37	PHO; 16	LVS; 4	BRI; 15	CAL; 28	MAR; 29	TEX; 6	TAL; 32	RCH; 23	DAR; 13	DOV; 3	CLT; 6	KAN; 26	POC; 34	MCH; 23	SON; 5	DAY; 17	KEN; 20	NHA; 9	IND; 34	POC; 20	GLN; 1	MCH; 27	BRI; 10	ATL; 21	RCH; 21	CHI; 19	NHA; 30	DOV; 9	KAN; 9	CLT; 5	TAL; 19	MAR; 29	TEX; 11	PHO; 8	HOM; 39	19th	936	
2012	Richard Petty Motorsports	9	Ford	DAY; 13	PHO; 32	LVS; 13	BRI; 36	CAL; 21	MAR; 15	TEX; 20	KAN; 16	RCH; 22	TAL; 14	DAR; 9	CLT; 32	DOV; 10	POC; 13	**MCH**; 9	**SON**; 8	KEN; 13	DAY; 30	NHA; 19	IND; 20	POC; 10	GLN; 1	MCH; 5	BRI; 5	ATL; 17	RCH; 15	CHI; 27	NHA; 24	DOV; 18	TAL; 27	CLT; 33	KAN; 12	MAR; 24	TEX; 32	PHO; 18	HOM; 13	18th	950	
2013	Richard Petty Motorsports	9	Ford	DAY; 18	PHO; 19	LVS; 22	BRI; 19	CAL; 36	MAR; 8	TEX; 19	KAN; 20	RCH; 42	TAL; 14	DAR; 34	CLT; 10	DOV; 19	POC; 17	MCH; 23	SON; 7	KEN; 13	DAY; 26	NHA; 33	IND; 16	POC; 12	**GLN**; 31*	MCH; 6	BRI; 8	ATL; 13	RCH; 27	CHI; 15	NHA; 18	DOV; 16	KAN; 9	CLT; 17	TAL; 39	MAR; 19	TEX; 21	PHO; 26	HOM; 26	22nd	872	
2014	Richard Petty Motorsports	9	Ford	DAY; 18	PHO; 21	LVS; 24	BRI; 5	CAL; 30	MAR; 5	TEX; 20	DAR; 14	RCH; 18	TAL; 19	KAN; 24	CLT; 29	DOV; 16	POC; 24	MCH; 25	SON; 8	KEN; 13	DAY; 10	NHA; 27	IND; 22	POC; 14	GLN; 2	MCH; 12	BRI; 34	ATL; 42	RCH; 27	CHI; 25	NHA; 24	DOV; 26	KAN; 20	CLT; 25	TAL; 8	MAR; 23	TEX; 27	PHO; 10	HOM; 27	23rd	870	

===== Daytona 500 =====
Year	Team	Manufacturer	Start	Finish
2009	JTG Daugherty Racing	Toyota	23	17
2010	JTG Daugherty Racing	Toyota	18	41
2011	Richard Petty Motorsports	Ford	35	37
2012	Richard Petty Motorsports	Ford	7	13
2013	Richard Petty Motorsports	Ford	24	18
2014	Richard Petty Motorsports	Ford	7	18

==== Nationwide Series ====
NASCAR Nationwide Series results
Year	Team	No.	Make	1	2	3	4	5	6	7	8	9	10	11	12	13	14	15	16	17	18	19	20	21	22	23	24	25	26	27	28	29	30	31	32	33	34	35	NNSC	Pts	Ref
2007	Wood Brothers/JTG Racing	59	Ford	DAY; 16	CAL; 25	MXC; 8	LVS; 10	ATL; 28	BRI; 28	NSH; 17	TEX; 31	PHO; 22	TAL; 25	RCH; 26	DAR; 19	CLT; 20	DOV; 6	NSH; 36	KEN; 11	MLW; 15	NHA; 30	DAY; 35	CHI; 37	GTY; 18	IRP; 32	CGV; 7	GLN; 13	MCH; 19	BRI; 37	CAL; 13	RCH; 15	DOV; 20	KAN; 39	CLT; 40	**MEM**; 4	TEX; 30	PHO; 15	HOM; 10	8th	3477	
2008	JTG Daugherty Racing	59	Ford	DAY; 39	CAL; 22	LVS; 28	ATL; 11	BRI; 19	NSH; 23	TEX; 18	PHO; 17	MXC; 2	TAL; 28	RCH; 25	DAR; 10	CLT; 14	DOV; 30	NSH; 19	KEN; 6	MLW; 16	NHA; 14	DAY; 20	CHI; 15	GTY; 15	IRP; 20	CGV; 3	GLN; 1	MCH; 12	BRI; 34	CAL; 15	RCH; 13	DOV; 16	KAN; 11	CLT; 15	MEM; 15	TEX; 9	PHO; 24	HOM; 31	10th	3991	
2009	JTG Daugherty Racing	47	Toyota	DAY	CAL	LVS	BRI	TEX	NSH	PHO	TAL	RCH	DAR	CLT	DOV	NSH	KEN	MLW	NHA	DAY	CHI	GTY	IRP	IOW	GLN; 1	MCH	BRI	**CGV**; 2*	ATL	RCH	DOV	KAN	CAL	CLT	MEM	TEX	PHO	HOM	77th	375	
2010	JTG Daugherty Racing	47	Toyota	DAY	CAL	LVS	BRI	NSH	PHO	TEX	TAL	RCH	DAR	DOV	CLT	NSH	KEN	ROA	NHA	DAY	CHI	GTY	IRP	IOW	**GLN**; 1	MCH	BRI	**CGV**; 33	ATL	RCH	DOV	KAN	CAL	CLT	GTY	TEX	PHO	HOM	89th	264	
2011	Richard Petty Motorsports	9	Ford	DAY	PHO	LVS	BRI	CAL	TEX	TAL	NSH	RCH	DAR	DOV	IOW	CLT	CHI	MCH	ROA	DAY	KEN	NHA	NSH	IRP	IOW	GLN	CGV; 1	BRI	ATL	RCH	CHI	DOV	KAN	CLT	TEX	PHO	HOM		98th	0^{1}	
2013	Richard Petty Motorsports	9	Ford	DAY	PHO	LVS	BRI	CAL	TEX	RCH	TAL	DAR	CLT	DOV	IOW	MCH	ROA	KEN	DAY	NHA	CHI	IND	IOW	GLN	MOH; 7	BRI	ATL	RCH	CHI	KEN	DOV	KAN	CLT	TEX	PHO	HOM			106th	0^{1}	
2014	Richard Petty Motorsports	09	Ford	DAY	PHO	LVS	BRI	CAL	TEX	DAR	RCH	TAL	IOW	CLT	DOV	MCH	ROA	KEN	DAY	NHA	CHI	IND	IOW	GLN; 1	MOH	BRI	ATL	RCH	CHI	KEN	DOV	KAN	CLT	TEX	PHO	HOM			85th	0^{1}	

==== Craftsman Truck Series ====
NASCAR Craftsman Truck Series results
Year	Team	No.	Make	1	2	3	4	5	6	7	8	9	10	11	12	13	14	15	16	17	18	19	20	21	22	23	24	25	NCTC	Pts	Ref
2006	Wood Brothers/JTG Racing	20	Ford	DAY	CAL	ATL	MAR; 33	GTY; 34	CLT; 36	MFD; 23	DOV; 26	TEX; 27	MCH; 26	MLW; 18	KAN; 3	**KEN**; 19	MEM; 34	IRP; 22	NSH; 3	BRI; 26	NHA; 23	LVS; 7	TAL; 17	MAR; 25	ATL; 16	TEX; 10	PHO; 15	HOM; 27	21st	2228	

^{*} Season still in progress
^{1} Ineligible for series points

=== 24 Hours of Daytona ===
(key)

24 Hours of Daytona results
Year	Class	Team	Car	Co-drivers	Laps	Position	Class pos.
2005	GT	(Australia) Aussie Assault	Porsche GT3 Cup	(Australia) Paul Morris (New Zealand) Craig Baird (Australia) John Teulan	271	53 ^{DNF}	28 ^{DNF}
2013	DP	(United States) Michael Shank Racing	Ford Riley DP	(United States) A. J. Allmendinger (Brazil) Oswaldo Negri Jr. (United States) John Pew (United Kingdom) Justin Wilson	709	3	3

== See also ==
- List of foreign-born NASCAR race winners
- Team Australia

Sporting positions
Preceded by Mark Skaife	Winner of the Clipsal 500; 2004-2005	Succeeded by Jamie Whincup
Preceded by Mark Skaife	V8 Supercar Champion; 2003, 2004	Succeeded by Russell Ingall
Awards and achievements
Preceded by Matthew White	Mike Kable Young Gun Award; 2001	Succeeded by Rick Kelly
Preceded by inaugural	Barry Sheene Medal; 2003–2004	Succeeded by Craig Lowndes
Preceded by Will Power; 2007	Sir Jack Brabham Award with Mark Webber; 2009	Succeeded by Tony Gaze; 2011
