= 1996 Australian Formula Ford Championship =

Motor racing competition

Seasons
- ← 1995 1997 →

The 1996 Australian Formula Ford Championship was a CAMS sanctioned motor racing title for drivers of Formula Ford racing cars. It was the 27th national series for Formula Fords to be held in Australia and the 4th to be sanctioned as an Australian Formula Ford Championship. The series was promoted as the 1996 Ford Racing Slick 50 Australian Formula Ford Championship.

The championship was won by David Besnard driving a Van Diemen RF96.

== Calendar ==
The title was contested over an eight-round series, with two races per round.

Round	Circuit	Dates	Round winner	Map
1	(New South Wales) Eastern Creek Raceway	27 January	(Australia) Rich Fowler	1996 Australian Formula Ford Championship is located in Australia
2	(Victoria (state)) Sandown Raceway	4 February	(Australia) Jason Bargwanna (Australia) John Blanchard	1996 Australian Formula Ford Championship is located in Australia
3	(New South Wales) Mount Panorama Circuit	25 February	(Australia) Justin Cotter	1996 Australian Formula Ford Championship is located in Australia
4	(Victoria (state)) Phillip Island Grand Prix Circuit	14 April	(Australia) David Besnard	1996 Australian Formula Ford Championship is located in Australia
5	(Queensland) Lakeside International Raceway	12 May	(Australia) David Besnard	1996 Australian Formula Ford Championship is located in Australia
6	(Western Australia) Wanneroo Raceway	28 May	(Australia) Jason Bargwanna	1996 Australian Formula Ford Championship is located in Australia
7	(South Australia) Mallala Motor Sport Park	2 June	(Australia) David Besnard (Australia) Marcos Ambrose	1996 Australian Formula Ford Championship is located in Australia
8	(New South Wales) Oran Park Raceway	16 June	(Australia) David Besnard	1996 Australian Formula Ford Championship is located in Australia

== Results ==
Championship points were awarded at each race on the following basis:

Position	1st	2nd	3rd	4th	5th	6th	7th	8th	9th	10th
Points	20	16	14	12	10	8	6	4	2	1

Pos	Driver	No.	Car	Entrant	(New South Wales) EAS	(Victoria (state)) SAN	(New South Wales) BAT	(Victoria (state)) PHI	(Queensland) LAK	(Western Australia) WAN	(South Australia) MAL	(New South Wales) ORA	Pts
1	(Australia) David Besnard	84	Van Diemen RF96	David Besnard	18	16	28	40	40	20	36	32	230
2	(Australia) Jason Bargwanna	10	Spectrum 05c	Team Arrow	22	34	24	10	30	36	14	20	190
3	(Australia) John Blanchard	49	Van Diemen RF95	Australian Motor Sport Academy	3	34	21	8	30	14	18	28	156
4	(Australia) Marcos Ambrose	50	Swift SC95K	Swift Racing Cars	11	32	22	-	-	14	36	1	116
5	(Australia) Iccy Harrington	5	Van Diemen RF96	David Harrington	23	22	8	4	6	-	28	12	103
6	(Australia) Daniel Orr	11	Spectrum 05c Van Diemen RF92	Team Arrow; Daniel Orr	-	18	18	30	-	-	10	10	86
7	(Australia) Justin Cotter	71 & 25	Swift SC93F	Justin Cotter	-	4	32	12	14	4	-	8	74
8	(Australia) Dugal McDougall	6	Mygale SR95	Dugal McDougall	-	-	-	24	18	14	-	16	72
9	(Australia) Scott Bargwanna	20	Van Diemen RF95	Scott Bargwanna	-	16	11	6	2	12	-	8	55
10	(Australia) Rich Fowler	86	Van Diemen RF94	Tradelink Plumbing Supplies	25	-	-	10	1	10	-	-	46
11	(Australia) Christian Jones	27	Van Diemen RF95	Australian Motor Sport Academy	-	1	6	16	12	6	-	4	45
12	(Australia) Todd Kelly	19	Van Diemen RF93	Todd Kelly	10	-	-	-	1	16	-	16	43
13	(Australia) Darren Pate	13	Van Diemen RF95	Australian Motor Sport Academy	-	5	4	5	16	1	-	10	41
14	(Australia) Kerry Wade	61	Van Diemen RF92	Kerry Wade	-	-	-	-	-	18	8	4	30
15	(Australia) Ashley Cutchie	9	Swift SC95K	Swift Racing Cars	-	-	-	8	14	-	-	-	22
16	(Australia) Paul Stephenson	14	Van Diemen RF93	Paul Stephenson	18	-	2	-	-	-	-	-	20
17	(Australia) Garth Tander	96	Van Diemen RF95	Fastlane Racing	-	-	-	-	-	10	2	6	18
18	(Australia) Brett Burvill	73	Van Diemen RF92	Fastlane Racing	-	-	-	-	-	1	14	-	15
19	(Australia) Dean Lindstrom	31	Van Diemen RF91	Dean Lindstrom	-	-	-	13	-	-	1	-	14
20	(Australia) Cameron Partington	15	Van Diemen RF94	Reef City Ford	1	4	4	-	2	-	-	2	13
21	(Australia) Garry Gosatti	22	Van Diemen RF94	Fastlane Racing	-	-	-	-	-	-	12	-	12
21	(Australia) Mark Lowing	53	Swift SC93F	Mark Lowing	-	-	6	-	-	-	-	6	12
23	(Australia) Michael Dutton	26	Swift SC94F	Stephen Austin	8	-	-	-	-	-	-	-	8
24	(Australia) David Clark	35	Van Diemen RF95	Australian Motor Sport Academy	-	-	-	-	-	6	-	-	6
24	(Australia) David Clinton	81	Van Diemen RF92	David Clinton	-	-	-	-	-	-	6	-	6
26	(Australia) Geoff Foster	82	Van Diemen RF95	Fastlane Racing	-	-	-	-	-	4	-	-	4
27	(Australia) Cameron Shearer	48	Mygale SR95	Dugal McDougall	-	-	-	-	-	-	-	2	2
28	(Australia) Brendan Richards	30	Van Diemen RF95	Brendan Richards	-	-	-	-	-	-	1	-	1
28	(Australia) William Anderson	90	Van Diemen RF94	William Anderson	-	-	-	-	-	-	-	1	1
30	(Australia) Ben Morley	43	Reynard 88	Roadchill Express	0.5	-	-	-	-	-	-	-	0.5
Pos	Driver	No.	Car	Entrant	(New South Wales) EAS	(Victoria (state)) SAN	(New South Wales) BAT	(Victoria (state)) PHI	(Queensland) LAK	(Western Australia) WAN	(South Australia) MAL	(New South Wales) ORA	Pts
