= 2000 Australian Nations Cup Championship =

The 2000 Australian Nations Cup Championship was an Australian motor racing competition for Nations Cup cars. The championship, which was organised by Procar Australia, is recognised by the Confederation of Australian Motor Sport as the inaugural Australian Nations Cup Championship. The year 2000 marked the first season in which the High Performance cars from the Australian GT Production Car Championship were to contest their own separate series under the Nations Cup name.

The championship was won by Jim Richards driving a Porsche 911 GT3 Type 996.

== Calendar ==
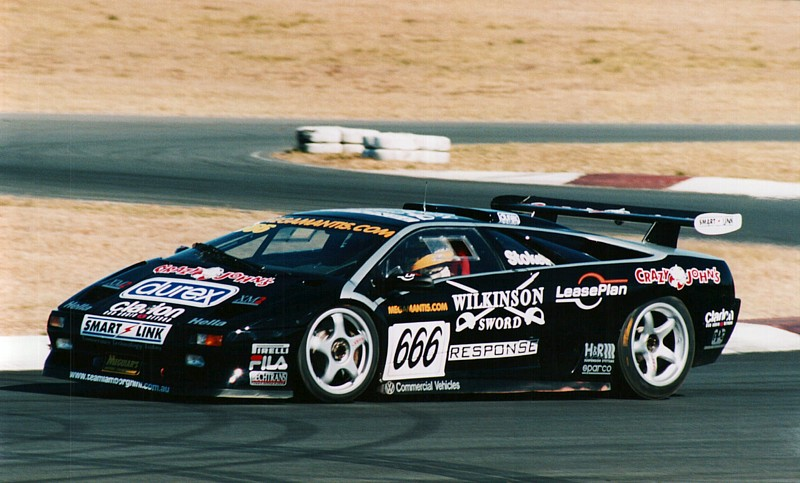
Paul Stokell placed fourth in the championship driving a Lamborghini Diablo (pictured in 2001)

The championship was contested over eight rounds.

Round	Circuit	State / Territory	Date	Format	Round winner	Car
1	Adelaide Parklands Circuit	South Australia	8–9 April	Two races	Mark Noske	Ferrari 360 Modena Challenge
2	Eastern Creek International Raceway	New South Wales	30 April	Two races	Mark Noske	Ferrari 360 Modena Challenge
3	Canberra Street Circuit	Australian Capital Territory	10–11 June	Three races	Peter Fitzgerald	Porsche 911 GT3
4	Queensland Raceway	Queensland	2 July	Two races	Wayne Park	Ferrari 360 Modena Challenge
5	Oran Park	New South Wales	30 July	Two races	Jim Richards	Porsche 911 GT3
6	Calder Park	Victoria	18–20 August	Two races	Peter Fitzgerald	Porsche 911 GT3
7	Gold Coast	Queensland	13–15 October	Three races	Jim Richards	Porsche 911 GT3
8	Mount Panorama	New South Wales	17–19 November	Three races	Paul Stokell	Lamborghini Diablo

== Points system ==
Championship points were awarded on a 15-12-10-8-6-5-4-3-2-1 basis for the first ten outright positions. An additional point was awarded for pole position.

== Championship standings ==
Position	Driver	No.	Car	Entrant	Ade	Eas	Can	Que	Ora	Cal	Gol	Mou	Total
1	Jim Richards	1	Porsche 911 GT3 Type 996	Jim Richards	24	23	34	24	30	20	40	29	224
2	Peter Fitzgerald	3	Porsche 911 GT3 Type 996	Falken Tyres	8	18	37	-	13	31	34	21	162
3	Mark Noske	4	Ferrari 360 Modena Challenge	Prancing Horse Racing	26	27	30	-	12	24	18	23	160
4	Paul Stokell	666	Lamborghini Diablo SVR	Team Lamborghini Australia	23	15	8	25	5	12	24	35	147
5	Peter Bradbury	14	Porsche 911 GT3 Type 996	TNT	7	14	8	9	20	12	21	26	117
6	Mark Williamson	80	Porsche 911 GT3 Type 996	Mark Williamson	4	8	30	7	7	8	22	15	101
7	Christian Jones	44	Ferrari 360 Modena Challenge	Prancing Horse Racing	-	-	-	13	16	8	18	8	63
8	Geoff Morgan	12	Dodge Viper ACR	monster.com	-	9	2	14	7	8	-	15	55
9	Wayne Park	10; 28 & 27	Porsche 911 GT3 Type 996; Ferrari 360 Modena Challenge	Peter Harburg; Ross Palmer Motorsport	4	-	14	26	10	-	-	-	54
10	Steve Webb	22	Porsche 911 GT3 Type 996	Steve Webb	15	5	1	-	10	-	-	-	31
11	Darren Palmer	27	Ferrari 360 Modena Challenge	Ross Palmer Motorsport	6	7	9	-	-	-	-	-	22
12	Greg Keene	21	Porsche 911 GT3 Type 996	Greg Keene	9	4	4	-	-	1	3	-	21
13	Rusty French	6	Dodge Viper ACR	Rusty French	-	1	2	-	-	-	6	9	18
14	Matthew Coleman	62	Porsche 911 GT3 Type 996	Matthew Coleman	-	-	-	-	-	-	-	16	16
15	Max Warwick	83	Porsche 911 GT3 Type 996	Max Warwick	-	-	11	-	2	-	-	-	13
16	Darcy Russell	7	Dodge Viper ACR	Rusty French	1	-	7	-	-	1	-	1	10
17	Jim Zerefos	22	Porsche 911 GT3 Type 996		-	-	-	-	-	8	-	-	8
17	Tony Quinn	43	Porsche 911 GT3 Type 996	Tony Quinn	-	-	-	-	-	-	7	1	8
19	Ed Aitken	8	Porsche 911 RSCS Type 993	Ed Aitken	4	2	-	-	-	-	-	-	6
20	Rick Bates	42	Porsche 911 RSCS Type 993	monster.com	-	-	-	-	-	-	5	-	5
21	Peter Harburg	91	Porsche 911 GT3 Type 996	Peter Harburg	-	-	-	3	-	-	-	-	3
22	Mike Reedy	81	Porsche 911 GT3 Type 996	Mark Williamson	2	-	-	-	-	-	-	-	2
22	Takeshi Nakamaru	81	Porsche 911 GT3 Type 996	Mark Williamson	-	-	1	1	-	-	-	-	2
24	Michael Simpson	23	BMW M3-R	Bruce Lynton	-	-	1	-	-	-	-	-	1
24	Mike Conway	79	Dodge Viper ACR	Mike Conway	-	-	-	-	1	-	-	-	1
24	Beric Lynton	23	BMW M3-R	Beric Lynton	-	-	-	-	-	-	1	-	1
