= Christian Jones (racing driver) =

Australian racing driver (born 1979)

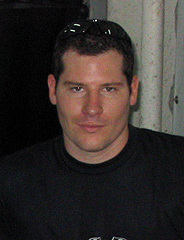
- Jones in 2005
- Nationality: Australian
- Born: 27 September 1979 (age 47)
- Retired: 2008
- Relatives: Alan Jones (adoptive father); Stan Jones (Grandfather)

Porsche Carrera Cup Asia
- Years active: 2007-08
- Teams: Christian Jones Motorsport
- Starts: 25
- Best finish: 3rd in 2007 Asian Porsche Carrera Cup

Previous series
- 1995 1996-98 1998 2000 2002-03 2004-05 2005-06 2008: Australian Suzuki Swift Series; Australian Formula Ford Ch. Formula Palmer Audi; Australian Nations Cup Ch. Australian Formula Three Ch. Asian Formula Three Champ. A1 Grand Prix; Australian Carrera Cup Ch.

Championship titles
- 2004: Asian Formula Three Champ.

Christian Alan Jones (born 27 September 1979) is an Australian racing driver; he is the adopted son of 1980 Formula One World Champion Alan Jones.

== Biography ==
Winning several karting championships in his early teens, Jones moved to Australian Formula Ford in 1996-1998, with his best season finish of second in 1998. Later that year, he moved to Formula Palmer Audi winter series, placing 4th in the championship. A brief return to racing in 2000 with a Ferrari in Australia's GT Championship (PROCAR), lead to a full return at the end of the 2002 Australian Formula Three Championship, which saw him place fourth in the 2003 title. In 2004, he won the Asian Formula Three Championship and subsequently entered the 2004 Macau Grand Prix, finishing 17th. In 2005, he represented Australia in the A1 Grand Prix series. 2007 saw Jones return to Asia and the Porsche Carrera Cup Asian Championship where he finished third. The same year saw Jones make his Porsche Supercup debut at the Turkish Grand Prix support race in Istanbul. For 2007/08, he was linked to the new Speedcar Series, based in the Middle East, following the A1 Grand Prix calendar. Also linked were Jean Alesi and Ukyo Katayama, but continued in the Carrera Cup Asia Championship placing fourth and also the Surfers Paradise round of the Australian Carrera Cup Championship placing sixth for the round

Jones made a return to racing in the 2009 Malaysia Merdeka Endurance Race for Team Hong Kong Racing driving an Aston Martin Vantage GT2 and in 2011 driving for the Asia Pacific Arrows Racing Lamborghini Gallardo LP560 GT3 placing fourth.

== Career results ==
=== Karting career summary ===
Season	Series	Position
1994	CIK Stars of Karting - Pro Junior KF3	**1st**

=== Circuit racing career ===
Season	Series	Position	Car	Team
1996	Australian Formula Ford Championship	11th	Van Diemen RF95 - Ford	Australian Motor Sport Academy
1997	Australian Formula Ford Championship	6th	Spectrum 06 - Ford	George Stockman
1998	Australian Formula Ford Championship	**2nd**	Spectrum 06b - Ford	OAMPS Insurance Group
1998	Formula Palmer Audi Winter Series	4th	Van Diemen PA - Audi	MotorSport Vision
2000	Australian Nations Cup Championship	7th	Ferrari 360 Challenge	Ross Palmer Motorsport
2002	Australian Formula Three Championship	19th	Dallara F301 - Mugen Honda	Christian Jones Motorsport
2003	Australian Formula Three Championship	4th	Dallara F301 - Mugen Honda	Christian Jones Motorsport
2004	Asian Formula Three Championship	**1st**	Dallara F301 - Mugen Honda	Christian Jones Motorsport
2004	Macau Grand Prix	17th	Dallara F304 - TOM'S Toyota	TME Racing
2005	Asian Formula Three Championship	7th	Dallara F301 - Mugen Honda	Christian Jones Motorsport
2005/6	A1 Grand Prix	13th	Lola A1GP Zytek	A1 Team Australia
2007	Porsche Carrera Cup Asia	**3rd**	Porsche 997 GT3 Cup	SCC Racing Team
2008	Australian Carrera Cup Championship	21st	Porsche 997 GT3 Cup	Greg Murphy Racing
2008	Porsche Carrera Cup Asia	4th	Porsche 997 GT3 Cup	Christian Jones Motorsport

=== Complete Macau Grand Prix results ===
Year	Team	Car	Qualifying	Quali race	Main race
2004	TME Racing	Dallara F304	28th	22nd	17th

=== Complete A1 Grand Prix results ===
(key) (Races in bold indicate pole position) (Races in italics indicate fastest lap)

Year	Entrant	1	2	3	4	5	6	7	8	9	10	11	12	13	14	15	16	17	18	19	20	21	22	DC	Points
2005–06	Australia	GBR; SPR; PO	GBR; FEA; PO	GER; SPR; 15	GER; FEA; 14	POR; SPR; PO	POR; FEA; PO	AUS; SPR; PO	AUS; FEA; PO	MYS; SPR; PO	MYS; FEA; PO	UAE; SPR; PO	UAE; FEA; PO	RSA; SPR; PO	RSA; FEA; PO	IDN; SPR; PO	IDN; FEA; PO	MEX; SPR; 16	MEX; FEA; Ret	USA; SPR	USA; FEA	CHN; SPR	CHN; FEA	**13th**	**51**

=== Complete Porsche Supercup results ===
(key) (Races in bold indicate pole position) (Races in italics indicate fastest lap)

Year	Team	1	2	3	4	5	6	7	8	9	10	11	DC	Points
2007	Golden Spike Pertamina Indonesia RT	BHR1	BHR2	ESP1	MON	FRA	GBR	GER	HUN	TUR; Ret	BEL	ITA	**NC**	**0**

Sporting positions
Preceded by Pepon Marave	Asian Formula Three Champion; 2004	Succeeded by Ananda Mikola
Awards and achievements
Preceded by Mike Hazelton	Jon Targett Perpetual Karting Trophy; 1995	Succeeded by Ryan Briscoe
