= 1998 Australian Formula Ford Championship =

Motor racing competition

The 1998 Australian Formula Ford Championship was a CAMS sanctioned Australian motor racing title for drivers of Formula Ford racing cars. It was the sixth iteration of the Australian Formula Ford Championship,

The championship was won by Adam Macrow driving a Spectrum 06. Singaporean-born Christian Murchison claimed Rookie of the Year honours.

== Calendar ==
The championship was contested over an eight round series with two races per round.

Round	Circuit	Dates	Round winner	Map
1	(Victoria (state)) Sandown Raceway	1 February	(Australia) Adam Macrow	1998 Australian Formula Ford Championship is located in Australia
2	(Queensland) Lakeside International Raceway	29 March	(Australia) Dugal McDougall	1998 Australian Formula Ford Championship is located in Australia
3	(Victoria (state)) Phillip Island Grand Prix Circuit	19 April	(Australia) Adam Macrow (Australia) Steve Owen	1998 Australian Formula Ford Championship is located in Australia
4	(New South Wales) Winton Motor Raceway	3 May	(Australia) Adam Macrow	1998 Australian Formula Ford Championship is located in Australia
5	(South Australia) Mallala Motor Sport Park	24 May	(Australia) Adam Macrow	1998 Australian Formula Ford Championship is located in Australia
6	(Western Australia) Wanneroo Raceway	31 May	(Singapore) Christian Murchison	1998 Australian Formula Ford Championship is located in Australia
7	(Victoria (state)) Calder Park Raceway	21 June	(Australia) Christian Jones (Australia) Tim Leahey	1998 Australian Formula Ford Championship is located in Australia
8	(New South Wales) Oran Park Raceway	2 August	(Australia) Tim Leahey	1998 Australian Formula Ford Championship is located in Australia

== Results ==
Championship points were awarded at each race on the following basis:

Position	1st	2nd	3rd	4th	5th	6th	7th	8th	9th	10th
Points	20	16	14	12	10	8	6	4	2	1

Pos	Driver	No.	Car	Entrant	(Victoria (state)) SAN	(Queensland) LAK	(Victoria (state)) PHI	(Victoria (state)) WIN	(South Australia) MAL	(Western Australia) WAN	(Victoria (state)) CAL	(New South Wales) ORA	Pts
1	(Australia) Adam Macrow	8	Spectrum 06	Team Arrow	40	32	28	40	40	6	7	18	211
2	(Australia) Christian Jones	6	Spectrum 06b	OAMPS Insurance Group	6	20	24	17	32	30	34	20	183
3	(Australia) Tim Leahey	35	Van Diemen RF98	Fastlane Racing	12	26	24	4	24	30	34	26	180
4	(Australia) Greg Ritter	5	Van Diemen RF98	Garry Rogers Motorsport	10	10	-	28	16	4	28	13	109
5	(Singapore) Christian Murchison	18	Van Diemen RF98	Fastlane Racing	-	-	16	-	28	40	-	14	98
6	(Australia) Dugal McDougall	16	Mygale SJ98	Apache Constructors	30	40	-	22	1	-	-	-	93
7	(Australia) Alex Davison	40	Van Diemen RF95	Sonic Motor Racing Services	6	1	-	-	16	8	28	10	69
8	(Australia) Craig Zerner	4	Spectrum 06b	George Stockman	8	14	14	26	-	-	-	-	62
9	(Australia) Steve Owen	27	Spectrum 06b	Team Arrow	14	-	28	-	4	-	12	-	58
10	(Australia) Ashley Seward	81	Spectrum 06b	Ashley Seward	16	-	14	-	4	10	2	11	57
11	(Australia) Iccy Harrington	45	Mygale SJ98	Apache Constructors	-	-	18	14	4	2	4	-	42
12	(Australia) Aaron McNally	7	Van Diemen RF97	Aaron McNally	28	7	-	-	-	-	-	-	35
12	(Australia) Justin Cotter	9	Van Diemen RF95	Factory Enterprises	1	-	1	6	1	-	8	18	35
14	(Australia) Owen Kelly	47	Spectrum 06b	S H Racing	-	-	4	18	-	1	10	-	33
15	(Australia) Kerry Wade	12	Van Diemen RF94	Kerry Wade	-	-	-	3	-	24	-	-	27
15	(Australia) Tyler Mecklem	95	Van Diemen RF91	TDK Australia	-	-	-	-	16	1	10	-	27
17	(Australia) Christian Jory	90	Swift SC93F	Christian Jory	-	-	8	8	-	-	-	-	16
17	(Australia) Ty Hanger	55	Swift SC93F	Ty Hanger	-	2	6	-	-	-	8	-	16
19	(Australia) Will Power	46	Swift SC92F	Robert Power	-	14	-	-	-	-	-	1	15
20	(Australia) Robert Jones	43	Van Diemen RF94	Car-Trek Racing	-	14	-	-	-	-	-	-	14
20	(Australia) Ray Stubber	54	Spectrum 06b		-	-	-	-	-	14	-	-	14
22	(Australia) Stuart Kostera	21	Van Diemen RF95		-	-	-	-	-	12	-	-	12
23	(Australia) Christopher Dell	57	Van Diemen RF96B	Christopher Dell	8	-	-	-	-	-	-	-	8
24	(Australia) Robert Miller	29	Van Diemen RF95	Robert Miller	6	-	-	-	-	-	-	-	6
24	(Australia) Michael Simpson	25	Van Diemen RF96	Michael Simpson	-	6	-	-	-	-	-	-	6
26	(Australia) Jim McKinnon	70	Van Diemen RF95	Jim McKinnon	-	-	1	-	-	4	-	-	5
26	(Australia) Leanne Ferrier	42	Van Diemen RF94	Leanne Ferrier	-	-	-	-	-	-	-	5	5
28	(Australia) Chris Staff	61	Van Diemen RF92		-	-	-	-	-	-	-	3	3
29	(Australia) Dean Lindstrom	24	Van Diemen RF91		1	-	-	-	-	-	-	-	1
29	(Australia) Ben Savage	36	Spectrum 06b	Team Arrow	-	-	-	-	-	-	1	-	1
31	(Australia) Ryan McLeod	96	Van Diemen RF91		-	-	-	-	-	-	-	0.5	0.5
Pos	Driver	No.	Car	Entrant	(Victoria (state)) SAN	(Queensland) LAK	(Victoria (state)) PHI	(Victoria (state)) WIN	(South Australia) MAL	(Western Australia) WAN	(Victoria (state)) CAL	(New South Wales) ORA	Pts

Note: Each car was required to use a Ford 1600cc crossflow engine.

Note: Only half points were awarded for Race 2 of Round 8 as the race was stopped prematurely due to an accident.
