= 2006 Macau Grand Prix =

Formula Three motor race

Race details
Date	19 November 2006
Official name	53rd Polytec Macau Grand Prix
Location	Guia Circuit, Macau
Course	Temporary street circuit 6.120 km (3.803 mi)
Distance	Qualifying Race; 10 laps, 61.200 km (38.028 mi); Main Race; 15 laps, 91.800 km (57.042 mi)
Weather	Qualifying Race: Bright and dry Main Race: Cloudy and dry
- Qualifying Race

Pole
Driver	(Japan) Kamui Kobayashi	ASM Formule 3
Time	2:13.449

Fastest Lap
Driver	(United Kingdom) Mike Conway	Räikkönen-Robertson Racing
Time	2:13.457 (on lap 4 of 10)

Podium
First	(Japan) Kamui Kobayashi	ASM Formule 3
Second	(Estonia) Marko Asmer	Hitech Racing
Third	(Japan) Kohei Hirate	Manor Motorsport
- Main Race

Pole
Driver	(Japan) Kamui Kobayashi	ASM Formule 3

Fastest Lap
Driver	(Brazil) Roberto Streit	Prema Powerteam
Time	2:12.527 (on lap 12 of 15)

Podium
First	(United Kingdom) Mike Conway	Räikkönen-Robertson Racing
Second	(United States) Richard Antinucci	ASM Formule 3
Third	(Germany) Adrian Sutil	TOM'S

The 2006 Macau Grand Prix (formally the 53rd Polytec Macau Grand Prix) was a Formula Three (F3) car race held on 19 November 2006, on the streets of Macau. Unlike other races, such as the Masters of Formula 3, the 2006 Macau Grand Prix was not part of any F3 championship, but was open to entries from all F3 championships. The race itself was made up of two races: a ten-lap qualifying race that set the starting order for the 15-lap main race. The 2006 race was the 53rd Macau Grand Prix and the 24th for F3 cars.

Mike Conway of Raikkonen-Robertson Racing won the Grand Prix after finishing seventh in the previous day's qualification race won by Kamui Kobayashi of ASM Formule 3. Conway took the lead after a multi-car accident between Kobayashi, Paul di Resta and Marko Asmer on the first lap of the race and held it to claim the first victory for a British driver in the Macau Grand Prix since Darren Manning in the 1999 edition. Richard Antinucci of ASM Formula 3 finished second, while TOM'S driver Adrian Sutil finished third.

== Background and entry list ==
The Macau Grand Prix is a Formula Three (F3) race considered to be a stepping stone to higher motor racing categories such as Formula One and has been termed the territory's most prestigious international sporting event. The 2006 Macau Grand Prix was the event's 53rd running and the 24th under F3 rules. It took place on the 6.2 km (3.9 mi) 22-turn Guia Circuit on 19 November 2006 with three preceding days of practice and qualifying.

Drivers had to compete in a Fédération Internationale de l'Automobile (FIA)-regulated championship race in 2006, either in the FIA Formula 3 International Trophy or one of the domestic championships, with the highest-placed drivers earning priority in being invited to the race. Each of the four major F3 series had a champion on the event's 32-car grid. Paul di Resta, the F3 Euro Series champion, was joined in Macau by British title victor Mike Conway, Italian series winner Mauro Massironi and Japanese champion Adrian Sutil. The other F3 series champion in the entry list was James Winslow, the Asian F3 champion. He was joined by Spanish F3 Championship runner-up Roldán Rodríguez. Five Macanese drivers received invitations to compete in the race: Rodolfo Ávila, Michael Ho, Lei Kit Meng, Lou Meng Cheong and Jo Merszei. F3 Euro Series runner-up Sebastian Vettel was the pre-race favourite for victory.

== Practice and qualifying ==
There were two half-hour practice sessions before the race on Sunday: one on Thursday morning and one on Friday morning. Kohei Hirate set the fastest time for Manor Motorsport in the opening practice session with a lap of 2 minutes, 14.887 seconds on his final attempt, 0.545 seconds faster than anybody else. His closest challenger was Roberto Streit of Prema Powerteam in second. Kazuki Nakajima took third in the session's closing moments and Conway was fourth having led for most of the session. Sutil, Richard Antinucci, his American compatriot Charlie Kimball, Vettel, Marko Asmer and Kamui Kobayashi followed in positions five through ten. Daisuke Ikeda was hit by another competitor during the session and spun backwards into the barrier at Lisboa turn. When Kazuya Oshima hit a wall at R-Bend corner, he damaged his vehicle's front-left wheel and suspension.

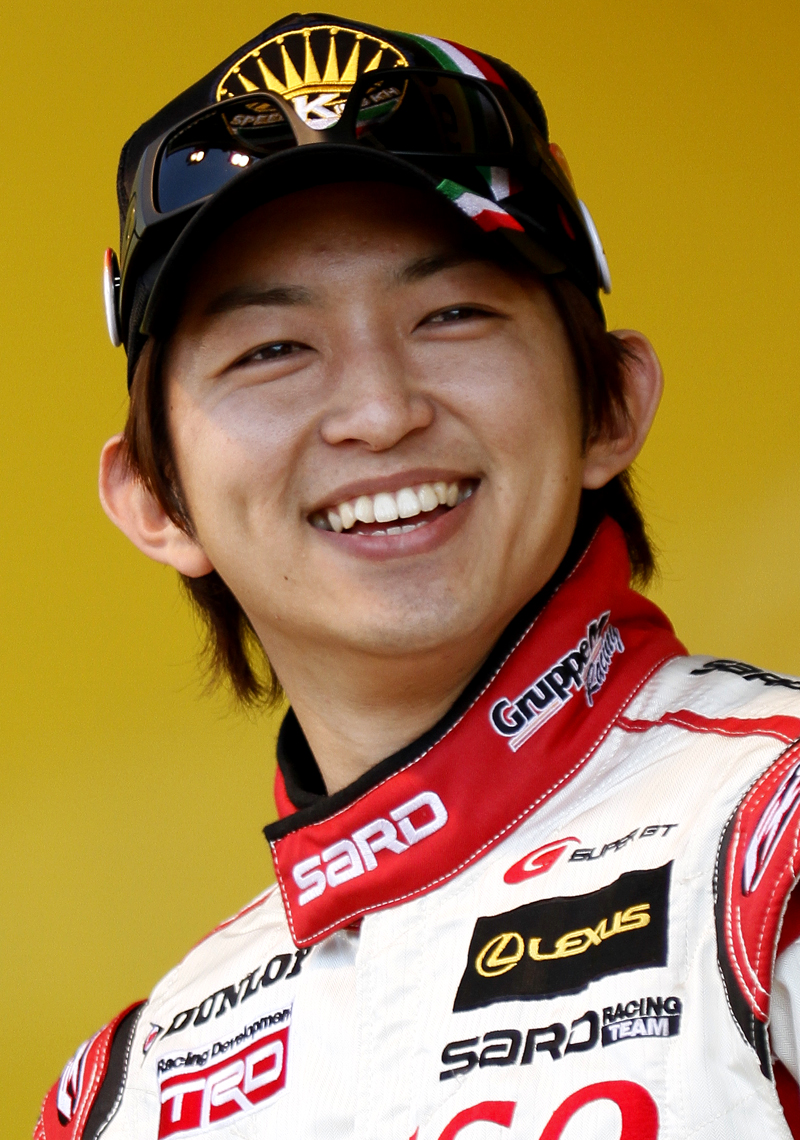
Kohei Hirate (pictured in 2010) was second in the duo of qualifying sessions held to determine the starting order for the qualifying race but was ultimately unable to replicate this performance in the Grand Prix itself.

Qualifying was split into two 45-minute sessions, one on Thursday afternoon and one on Friday afternoon. Each driver's fastest time from either session counted toward their final starting place in the qualification race. The first qualifying session was held in cloudy weather, and the threat of rain never materialised because the start was delayed due to multiple crashes in the Guia Race of Macau practice session. Once qualifying commenced, Asmer went fastest with a 2 minutes, 13.965 seconds lap set ten minutes before it ended. He was the only driver to reach 2 minutes, 13 seconds. Hirate was provisionally second after moving up during the session to lead the field before Asmer's fastest lap. Romain Grosjean and Kamui Kobayashi ran strongly in qualifying and finished third and fourth, respectively. Fábio Carbone did little to set a quick lap and was provisionally fifth. Conway was the best-placed British driver in sixth. Though he entered the pit lane for a car and brake check after going off the circuit, Antinucci was seventh, Streit took eighth and Kimball ninth. Di Resta, tenth, had car handling difficulties, punctured his right-front tyre by driving over debris at the Melco hairpin and locked his brakes. Koudai Tsukakoshi, eleventh, was almost two seconds off Asmer's pace. Following him were the Carlin duo of Maro Engel and Sébastien Buemi and the Japanese pair of Nakajima and Oshima. The German duo of Sutil and Vettel took the 16th and 17th positions. The British F3 International Series Rookie of the Year Oliver Jarvis had food poisoning and took 18th, followed by fellow British drivers James Jakes and Stephen Jelley. Ikeda, Yelmer Buurman, Jonathan Kennard, Rodríguez, Ho, Máximo Cortés, Ávila, Winslow, Cheong, Lei and Merszei completed the provisional grid order. Kimball pushed hard and crashed heavily at Fisherman's Bend corner, causing the session's first stoppage. Kimball was unhurt and exited his car unaided and helped clear debris. Soon after, Sutil ended the session two minutes early for not noticing a warning flag alterting drivers of the slippery track surface at Fisherman's Bend and striking a wall. Sutil was uninjured but remained in his car for several minutes for safety reasons.

The second thirty-minute practice session began with the provisional pole sitter Asmer drawing attention when he went wide at San Francisco Bend and collided with a barrier exiting the corner. Buemi then damaged his car's front-left corner by driving straight into a wall at Police Bend, and the session was stopped with ten minutes remaining when Oshima drifted into a barrier at R-Bend. Conway led with a lap of 2 minutes, 13.925 seconds despite being delayed by slower traffic. Antinucci followed 0.075 seconds behind in second. Grosjean, Jakes, Sutil, Nakajima, Vettel, Carbone, Tsukakoshi and fellow Japanese Kobayashi were in positions three through ten.

I am very happy as it is my first-ever pole position in F3. The car was perfect and the team worked well. In the end, I tried to push again, but probably a little bit too much – as I crashed. Fortunately, I already had my position at that time."

— Kamui Kobayashi on taking pole for the 25th Macau Grand Prix held to F3 regulations.

In the second qualifying session, Winslow and Kobayashi ran wide at the escape roads at San Francisco Bend and Lisboa corner respectively, resulting in localised yellow flags being waved and drivers being unable from setting a timed lap. Conway slid and struck the end of an outside tyre barrier near the pit lane entry at Fisherman's Bend with his right-rear tyre, bending his suspension, stopping qualifying 13 minutes in. Soon after, Sutil collided with the Police Bend barrier, littering debris to be removed and another stoppage to qualifying. When the session resumed, Hirate improved on Asmer's time to take pole position until Kobayashi claimed it with a 2 minutes, 13.449 seconds lap. The session was stopped for the third time because Kimball severely damaged his car's left side at R-Bend. He was unhurt. Separate crashes by Grosjean and Kobayashi due to a late rain shower caused the session to end early but Kobayashi's lap was fast enough for pole position. Hirate joined Kobayashi on the front row, while Grosjean remained third. Asmer could not repeat his first qualifying performance and was fourth. Antinucci was second when he entered Lisboa's escape road, but he dropped to fifth by the end of qualifying. Di Resta qualified sixth and avoided damage to his car by minor contact with the R-Bend barrier. Streit, Nakajima, Kimball and Vettel completed the top ten placings. Behind them the rest of the field consisted of Tsukakoshi, Conway, Carbone, Engel, Sutil, Jelley, Buemi, Ikoda, Jakes, Oshima, Kennard, Jarvis, Buurman, Cortés, Rodríguez, Massironi, Winslow, Ávila, Ho, Cheong, Lei and Merszei. After qualifying, Antinucci's fastest time from the session was deleted because he was found to have sped under yellow flag conditions during Thursday's sole practice session, dropping him to 15th. Ho received the same penalty, and Oshima was demoted ten starting places due to an engine change.

=== Qualifying classification ===
Each of the driver's fastest lap times from the two qualifying sessions are denoted in bold.

Final qualifying classification
Pos	No.	Driver	Team	Q1 Time	Rank	Q2 Time	Rank	Gap	Grid
1	6	(Japan) Kamui Kobayashi	ASM Formule 3	2:14.500	4	**2:13.449**	1		1
2	1	(Japan) Kohei Hirate	Manor Motorsport	2:14.256	2	**2:13.566**	2	+0.117	2
3	16	(France) Romain Grosjean	Signature	2:14.404	3	**2:13.930**	3	+0.481	3
4	18	(Estonia) Marko Asmer	Hitech Racing	**2:13.965**	1	2:15.108	14	+0.516	4
5	4	(United States) Richard Antinucci	ASM Formule 3	2:15.242	7	**2:14.105**	4	+0.656	15^{1}
6	5	(United Kingdom) Paul di Resta	ASM Formule 3	2:15.593	10	**2:14.175**	5	+0.726	5
7	22	(Brazil) Roberto Streit	Prema Powerteam	2:15.449	8	**2:14.217**	6	+0.768	6
8	2	(Japan) Kazuki Nakajima	Manor Motorsport	2:16.302	14	**2:14.231**	7	+0.782	7
9	17	(United States) Charlie Kimball	Signature	2:15.479	9	**2:14.379**	8	+0.930	8
10	9	(Germany) Sebastian Vettel	Carlin Motorsport	2:16.620	16	**2:14.390**	9	+0.941	9
11	21	(Japan) Koudai Tsukakoshi	Prema Powerteam	2:15.957	11	**2:14.553**	10	+1.104	10
12	26	(United Kingdom) Mike Conway	Räikkönen-Robertson Racing	2:14.755	6	**2:14.578**	11	+1.129	11
13	14	(Brazil) Fábio Carbone	ThreeBond Racing	**2:14.745**	5	2:14.853	12	+1.296	12
14	12	(Germany) Maro Engel	Carlin Motorsport	2:16.102	12	**2:14.857**	13	+1.408	13
15	7	(Germany) Adrian Sutil	TOM'S	2:16.978	17	**2:15.159**	15	+1.710	14
16	27	(United Kingdom) Stephen Jelley	Räikkönen-Robertson Racing	2:17.320	20	**2:14.490**	16	+2.041	16
17	11	(Switzerland) Sébastien Buemi	Carlin Motorsport	2:16.280	13	**2:15.614**	17	+2.165	17
18	32	(Japan) Daisuke Ikeda	EMS Racing	2:17.533	21	**2:15.786**	18	+2.337	18
19	3	(United Kingdom) James Jakes	Manor Motorsport	2:17.244	19	**2:16.010**	19	+2.561	19
20	8	(Japan) Kazuya Oshima	TOM'S	**2:16.575**	15	no time		+3.126	30^{2}
21	24	(United Kingdom) Jonathan Kennard	Alan Docking Racing	2:18.211	23	**2:16.644**	20	+3.496	20
22	10	(United Kingdom) Oliver Jarvis	Carlin Motorsport	2:17.121	18	**2:16.945**	21	+3.195	21
23	15	(Netherlands) Yelmer Buurman	Fortec Motorsport	2:18.093	22	**2:17.091**	22	+3.496	22
24	20	(Spain) Máximo Cortés	Hitech Racing	2:20.443	27	**2:17.191**	23	+3.642	23
25	19	(Spain) Roldán Rodríguez	Hitech Racing	2:19.148	25	**2:17.286**	24	+3.837	24
26	29	(Italy) Mauro Massironi	Ombra Racing	2:18.654	24	**2:18.494**	25	+5.045	25
27	33	(United Kingdom) James Winslow	ZAP Speed	2:20.699	29	**2:18.957**	26	+5.508	26
28	23	(Macau) Rodolfo Ávila	Performance Racing	2:20.484	28	**2:19.016**	27	+5.567	27
29	28	(Macau) Michael Ho	Ombra Racing	2:20.894	26	**2:20.590**	28	+7.141	28^{1}
30	30	(Macau) Lou Meng Cheong	Alan Docking Racing	**2:24.118**	30	2:25.917	29	+10.669	29
31	31	(Macau) Lei Kit Meng	Swiss Racing Team	**2:24.662**	31	no time		+11.213	31
32	30	(Macau) Jo Merszei	Swiss Racing Team	2:27.708	32	**2:26.326**	30	+12.877	32
110% qualifying time: 2:26.793
**Bold time** indicates the faster of the two times that determined the grid order.

- **^1** – Richard Antinucci and Michael Ho were penalised and their fastest lap times were deleted.
- **^2** – Kazuya Oshima was penalised by changing the engine and he was given a penalty of ten-place grid demotion.

== Qualifying race ==
The qualifying race to set the grid order for the main race started at 13:20 Macau Standard Time (UTC+08:00) on 18 November. The weather at the start of the race was bright and dry with the air temperature at 26 °C (79 °F) and the track temperature 27 °C (81 °F). Hirate collided with the exit barrier at San Francisco Bend during the formation lap, damaging his car's front-right suspension. Hirate's pit crew worked quickly to allow him to start, but his steering angle was skewed to the left, and he had to hold it on the straight to control his car under braking. Kobayashi lost the lead to Hirate driving towards Mandarin Bend, but used the slipstream into Lisboa turn to retake the lead. Grosjean stalled on the grid, causing all drivers behind him to swerve wildly in order to avoid ramming into his stranded vehicle. Tsukakoshi moved to third by the end of the first lap, while Asmer (despite a slipping clutch) moved from fourth to second off the start. At the end of the lap, two drivers retired in the pit lane: Streit had a wheel detach from contact with a circuit barrier, and Engel's front-left wheel was removed in a collision with the Fisherman's Bend corner wall.

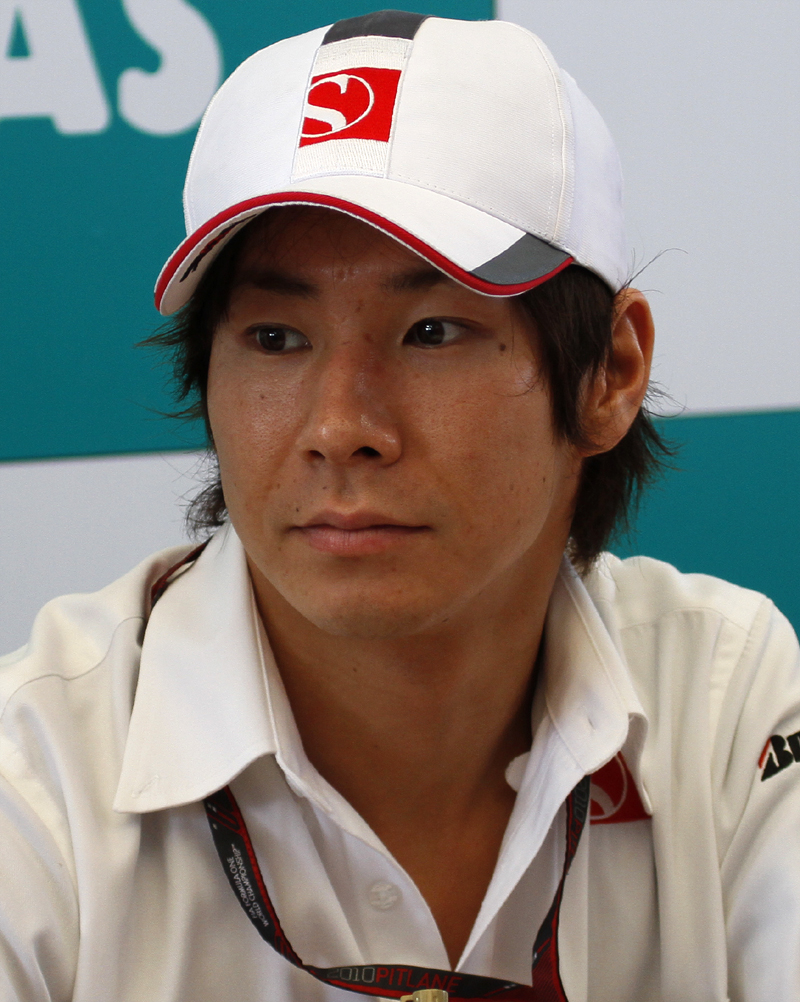
Kamui Kobayashi (pictured in 2010) led every lap of the qualification to claim his maiden F3 victory and started from pole position in the Grand Prix itself.

On lap three, Kobayashi was pulling away at the front of the field, and Tsukakoshi was passed by fellow Japanese Hirate at Lisboa corner for third place. Di Resta attempted to follow through but nearly clipped his front wing, and Tsukakoshi was given some space after di Resta lost momentum from his failed pass. Kimball led a battling pack of cars until Sutil passed him and the latter ran close to di Resta. Meanwhile, Nakajima set after Kimball and Conway moved to seventh position with successive passes Nakajima at Lisboa turn. Tsukakoshi dropped two places on the next lap as di Resta and Sutil passed him. Di Resta set the race's fastest lap and held it until Conway took it with a time of 2 minutes, 13.457 seconds and came close enough to challenge Tsukakoshi while Antinucci passed Kimball. Tsukakoshi attempted to overtake Sutil on the outside at Lisboa corner, but was hesitant to complete the pass. Conway considered overtaking Tsukakoshi but decided not to. At the front, Hirate drew closer to Asmer due to a possible damaged suspension rod for the former, while Vettel (driving with a damaged nose cone) had a braking problem and crashed into the barrier on lap nine while battling Kimball.

Tsukakoshi overtook Sutil on the lap, but could not pull away because duelling cars were nearby. At the end of the lap, Grosjean passed Kennard, with Buurman towing behind. Buurman and Kennard then collided and crashed into the wall at San Francisco Bend corner. Consequently, race officials waved yellow flags for the final lap to warn drivers of the wreckage and little action occurred. Jelley fell behind Buemi on the lap and hit the wall on his slowing lap, dislodging one of his rear wheels. Kobayashi was untroubled and won the qualifying race to start the Grand Prix from pole position. He was joined on the grid's front row by Asmer who successfully held off third-placed Hirate. Off the podium, di Resta was fourth, Tsukakoshi took fifth after winning his duel with sixth-placed Sutil. Conway, Nakajima, Antinucci and Kimball completed the top ten. Outside the top ten, Jarvis finished 11th. having moved from his starting position of 22nd. The rest of the finishing order was Buemi, Jelley, Ikeda, Grosjean, Oshima, Massironi, Cortés, Winslow, Jakes, Rodríguez, Carbone, Ho, Ávila, Cheong, Lei and Merszei.

=== Qualifying race classification ===
Final qualifying race classification
Pos	No.	Driver	Team	Laps	Time/Retired	Grid
1	6	(Japan) Kamui Kobayashi	ASM Formule 3	10	22:45.199	1
2	18	(Estonia) Marko Asmer	Hitech Racing	10	+3.333	4
3	1	(Japan) Kohei Hirate	Manor Motorsport	10	+3.935	2
4	5	(United Kingdom) Paul di Resta	ASM Formule 3	10	+6.715	5
5	21	(Japan) Koudai Tsukakoshi	Prema Powerteam	10	+9.714	10
6	7	(Germany) Adrian Sutil	TOM'S	10	+10.328	14
7	26	(United Kingdom) Mike Conway	Räikkönen-Robertson Racing	10	+10.892	11
8	2	(Japan) Kazuki Nakajima	Manor Motorsport	10	+12.686	7
9	4	(United States) Richard Antinucci	ASM Formule 3	10	+15.517	15
10	17	(United States) Charlie Kimball	Signature	10	+15.950	8
11	10	(United Kingdom) Oliver Jarvis	Carlin Motorsport	10	+17.756	21
12	11	(Switzerland) Sébastien Buemi	Carlin Motorsport	10	+19.495	17
13	27	(United Kingdom) Stephen Jelley	Räikkönen-Robertson Racing	10	+20.181	16
14	32	(Japan) Daisuke Ikeda	EMS Racing	10	+21.526	18
15	16	(France) Romain Grosjean	Signature	10	+22.476	3
16	8	(Japan) Kazuya Oshima	TOM'S	10	+35.924	30
17	29	(Italy) Mauro Massironi	Ombra Racing	10	+42.497	25
18	20	(Spain) Máximo Cortés	Hitech Racing	10	+42.802	23
19	33	(United Kingdom) James Winslow	ZAP Speed	10	+45.174	26
20	3	(United Kingdom) James Jakes	Manor Motorsport	10	+45.486	19
21	19	(Spain) Roldán Rodríguez	Hitech Racing	10	+46.310	24
22	14	(Brazil) Fábio Carbone	ThreeBond Racing	10	+1:09.008	12
23	28	(Macau) Michael Ho	Ombra Racing	10	+1:19.886	28
24	23	(Macau) Rodolfo Ávila	Performance Racing	10	+1:30.749	27
25	30	(Macau) Lou Meng Cheong	Alan Docking Racing	10	+1:50.156	29
26	31	(Macau) Lei Kit Meng	Swiss Racing Team	10	+2:16.132	31
27	30	(Macau) Jo Merszei	Swiss Racing Team	9	+1 lap	32
Ret	9	(Germany) Sebastian Vettel	Carlin Motorsport	8	Accident	9
Ret	24	(United Kingdom) Jonathan Kennard	Alan Docking Racing	8	Accident	20
Ret	15	(Netherlands) Yelmer Buurman	Fortec Motorsport	8	Accident	22
Ret	22	(Brazil) Roberto Streit	Prema Powerteam	1	Wheel	6
Ret	12	(Germany) Maro Engel	Carlin Motorsport	1	Wheel	13
Fastest lap: Mike Conway, 2:13.457, 165.08 km/h (102.58 mph) on lap 7

== Warm-up ==
On the morning of the main race, a twenty-minute warm-up was held. Di Resta drove faster than he had in any of the previous sessions, setting a new weekend best lap time of 2 minutes, 12.905 seconds. He was 0.076 seconds faster than Buemi in second. Asmer, Grosjean, Conway, Hirate, Streit, Carbone, Nakajima and Sutil made up positions three through ten. After the warm-up session, Vettel incurred a ten-place grid penalty for an engine change.

== Main Race ==
The race began on 19 November at 15:30 local time. The weather on the grid at the start was cloudy and dry with the air temperature at 25 °C (77 °F) and the track temperature was 26 °C (79 °F). Asmer made a faster start than Kobayashi and passed him for the lead at Mandarin Bend. However, Kobayashi went inside Asmer at Lisboa corner, and di Resta attempted to accompany him. Kobayashi outbraked himself and collided with a barrier leaving the turn. Di Resta locked his tyres and slammed into the back of Kobayashi's. After colliding wheels with di Resta, Asmer was trapped on the escape road as the rest of the field passed by. Conway became the leader as a result of these events, and he had a one-second lead over Hirate by the end of the lap. The safety car was dispatched at the end of the first lap due to multiple accidents. Di Resta understeered entering Fisherman's Bend and struck the wall, while Ávila crashed near him at the same corner. Cortés also retired after a crash, Kimball collided with the Fisherman's Bend Armco wall, and Carbone made a pit stop to replace a punctured tyre.

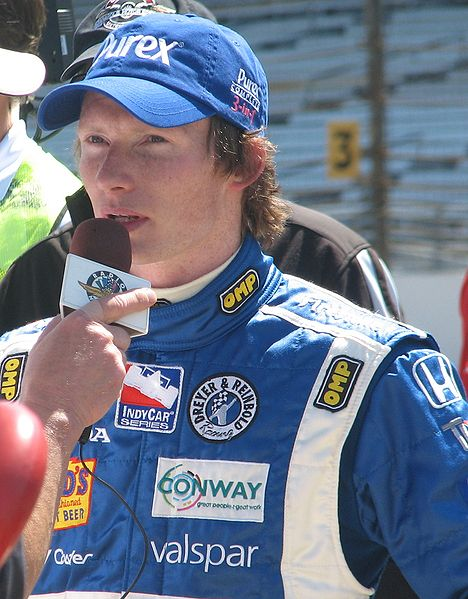
Mike Conway (pictured in 2009) took the lead after a first lap multi-car accident and kept it to become the first British driver to win the Macau Grand Prix since Darren Manning in 1999.

Nakajima planned an overtake on Hirate and narrowly avoided colliding with him at the Lisboa turn. Ikeda, Jelley, and Kennard pitted under the safety car, which was withdrawn at the end of lap four after all three stricken cars were extricated from the track. Conway led and pull away from Hirate to stop him from slipstreaming into Lisboa corner. Nakajima pressured Sutil and overtook him for third soon after. Meanwhile, Conway pushed hard enough on the sixth lap to lightly hit a wall with his front-right wheel at the San Francisco Bend turn, but he escaped with no significant damage. Yellow flags were briefly waved as Kimball skittered into the barrier and onto debris at Lisboa corner. Hirate caught Conway, who prevented the former from passing him for the lead. Nakajima, Sutil and Antiucci were three wide entering Lisboa turn; Antinucci benefited the most as Nakajima took fourth from Sutil but he out-braked himself. Both ran deep into the corner as Nakajima attempted a switchback manoeuvre. On lap seven, Antinucci was close by Sutil and overtook him on the outside at Lisboa for third. He then prevented Sutil from reclaiming the position.

Jarvis' engine was failing, and he fell behind Grosjean, the recovering Kobayashi, and Jakes. Buemi and Nakajima joined the battle for third after Buemi passed Nakajima after the latter lightly grazed a wall and Antinucci fended off Sutil. SSoon after, Kobayashi dropped out of the top twenty after sliding sideways into a barrier at Lisboa corner. On lap 12, Nakajima crashed on cold tyres at Police corner and retired. Yellow flags were briefly required at the second Lisboa turn after Ikeda slid wide and allowed Jelley to pass him, but they were quickly withdrawn as the leaders entered the area. Antinucci caught Hirate after two laps and moved out of his slipstream for a successful overtake for third on lap 12. Hirate slowed due to brake pressure issues and dropped to fourth on the following lap when Sutil outdragged him. Tsukakoshi and Hirate both retired after separate accidents on lap 14. Tsukakoshi missed the braking point for Fisherman's Bend corner and went into a barrier, while Hirate collided with a wall at San Francisco Bend. On the final lap, Streit was 200 m (660 ft) behind Vettel and attempted an overtake to the inside at Lisboa corner but both retired after colliding.

Conway kept the lead for the rest of the race to become the first British driver to win the Macau Grand Prix since Darren Manning won the 1999 race. Antinucci was closing in on Conway in the closing laps, but a slower car in the Mountain section impeded him and slid luridly on lap fourteen, leaving him 1.4 seconds behind in second, and Sutil completed the podium in third. Off the podium, Buemi came fourth, Grosjean was close behind in fifth, Jakes finished sixth having moved up fourteen from his starting position and Oshima finished seventh. Buurman and Engel were eighth and ninth after starting 30th and 32nd respectively and Carbone recovered from his first lap puncture to finish tenth. Jelley, Winslow, Asmer, Massironi, Jarvis, Kennard, Rodríguez, Ikeda, Kobayashi, Ho, Kimball, Cheong, Vettel, Streit, Merszei, Lei and Hirate were the final classified finishers. The attrition rate was low, with only five of the 32 entrants dropping out, and eleven accidents occurring during the race.

=== Main race classification ===
Final main race classification
Pos	No.	Driver	Team	Laps	Time/Retired	Grid
1	26	(United Kingdom) Mike Conway	Räikkönen-Robertson Racing	15	39:35.404	7
2	4	(United States) Richard Antinucci	ASM Formule 3	15	+1.489	9
3	7	(Germany) Adrian Sutil	TOM'S	15	+2.055	6
4	11	(Switzerland) Sébastien Buemi	Carlin Motorsport	15	+7.409	12
5	16	(France) Romain Grosjean	Signature	15	+8.752	5
6	3	(United Kingdom) James Jakes	Manor Motorsport	15	+23.963	20
7	8	(Japan) Kazuya Oshima	TOM'S	15	+29.948	16
8	15	(Netherlands) Yelmer Buurman	Fortec Motorsport	15	+35.978	29
9	12	(Germany) Maro Engel	Carlin Motorsport	15	+36.494	31
10	14	(Brazil) Fábio Carbone	ThreeBond Racing	15	+36.904	22
11	27	(United Kingdom) Stephen Jelley	Räikkönen-Robertson Racing	15	+44.681	13
12	33	(United Kingdom) James Winslow	ZAP Speed	15	+45.128	19
13	18	(Estonia) Marko Asmer	Hitech Racing	15	+45.466	2
14	29	(Italy) Mauro Massironi	Ombra Racing	15	+50.021	17
15	10	(United Kingdom) Oliver Jarvis	Carlin Motorsport	15	+50.142	15
16	24	(United Kingdom) Jonathan Kennard	Alan Docking Racing	15	+54.400	28
17	19	(Spain) Roldán Rodríguez	Hitech Racing	15	+56.547	21
18	32	(Japan) Daisuke Ikeda	EMS Racing	15	+58.457	14
19	6	(Japan) Kamui Kobayashi	ASM Formule 3	15	+1:02.141	1
20	28	(Macau) Michael Ho	Ombra Racing	15	+1:46.823	23
21	17	(United States) Charlie Kimball	Signature	15	+2:03.556	10
22	30	(Macau) Lou Meng Cheong	Alan Docking Racing	15	+2:06.282	25
23	9	(Germany) Sebastian Vettel	Carlin Motorsport	14	+1 lap	32^{3}
24	22	(Brazil) Roberto Streit	Prema Powerteam	14	+1 lap	30
25	30	(Macau) Jo Merszei	Swiss Racing Team	14	+1 lap	27
26	31	(Macau) Lei Kit Meng	Swiss Racing Team	14	+1 lap	26
27	1	(Japan) Kohei Hirate	Manor Motorsport	13	+2 laps	3
Ret	21	(Japan) Koudai Tsukakoshi	Prema Powerteam	12	Accident	5
Ret	2	(Japan) Kazuki Nakajima	Manor Motorsport	10	Accident	8
Ret	5	(United Kingdom) Paul di Resta	ASM Formule 3	0	Accident	4
Ret	23	(Macau) Rodolfo Ávila	Performance Racing	0	Accident	24
Ret	20	(Spain) Máximo Cortés	Hitech Racing	0	Accident	18
Fastest lap: Roberto Streit, 2:12.527, 166.24 km/h (103.30 mph) on lap 12

- ^3 – Sebastian Vettel was penalised by changing the engine and he was given a penalty of 10-grid demotion.
