= 2002 Macau Grand Prix =

Formula Three motor race

Race details
Date	17 November 2002
Location	Guia Circuit, Macau
Course	Temporary street circuit 6.120 km (3.803 mi)
Distance	30 laps, 165.27 km (102.69 mi)
- First leg

Pole
Driver	(Italy) Paolo Montin	TOM'S
Time	2:14.995

Fastest Lap
Driver	(India) Narain Karthikeyan	Carlin
Time	2:14.058

Podium
First	(Italy) Paolo Montin	TOM'S
Second	(France) Tristan Gommendy	ASM Formule 3
Third	(India) Narain Karthikeyan	Carlin
- Second leg
Driver	(Italy) Paolo Montin	TOM'S

Fastest Lap
Driver	(France) Tristan Gommendy	ASM Formule 3
Time	2:14.036

Podium
First	(France) Tristan Gommendy	ASM Formule 3
Second	(Finland) Heikki Kovalainen	Fortec Motorsport
Third	(Japan) Takashi Kogure	Mugen x Dome Project

The 2002 Macau Grand Prix (formally the 49th Macau Grand Prix) was a Formula Three (F3) motor race held on the streets of Macau on 17 November 2002. Unlike other races, such as the Masters of Formula 3, the 2002 Macau Grand Prix was not affiliated with any F3 championship and was open to entries from any F3 championship. The race was divided into two 15-lap aggregate legs: one in the morning and one in the afternoon. The driver who completed all 30 laps in the shortest time was declared the overall winner. The 2002 event was the 49th Macau Grand Prix and the 20th for F3 cars.

The Grand Prix was won by ASM Formule 3 driver Tristan Gommendy, having finished second in the first leg which Paolo Montin of TOM'S won. Montin lost the lead to Fortec Motorsport's Heikki Kovalainen at the start of the second leg. He held it until Gommendy in the faster car caught and passed Kovalainen at Lisboa corner after a restart on lap 12 and maintained the lead to win the race. Kovalainen took second position and the outright podium was completed by Takashi Kogure for the Mugen x Dome Project team.

== Background and entry list ==
The Macau Grand Prix is a Formula Three (F3) race that has been dubbed the territory's most prestigious international sporting event and a stepping stone to higher motorsport categories such as Formula One. The 2002 Macau Grand Prix was the event's 49th edition and the 20th to be held to F3 rules. It took place on the 6.2 km (3.9 mi) 22-turn Guia Circuit on 17 November 2002 after three preceding days of practice and qualifying.

Drivers had to compete in a Fédération Internationale de l'Automobile (FIA)-regulated championship race during the calendar year, in one of the seven national F3 championships that took place during the calendar year, with the best-placed drivers receiving priority in receiving an invitation to the race. Four of the five major F3 series were represented on the Macau 30-car grid by their respective champions. Robbie Kerr, the British champion, was joined in Macau by French title winner Tristan Gommendy, Italian victor Miloš Pavlović and All-Japan Formula Three winner Takashi Kogure. The only major winner of an F3 championship who did not compete in Macau for undisclosed reasons was German champion Gary Paffett. Three local competitors, Jo Merszei, Michael Ho and Kit Meng Lei, who did not compete in any F3 championship in 2002, were invited to compete by race organisers.

== Practice and qualifying ==
The race on Sunday was preceded by two one-hour practice sessions, one on Thursday morning and one on Friday morning. The first practice session in hot, humid weather, was delayed for ten minutes due to circuit officials repairing a tyre wall at Lisboa corner after practice for the local ACMC Trophy Race. TOM'S Paolo Montin lapped fastest at 2:17.798 in the session's closing seconds. The rest of the top ten were Yuji Ide, Gommendy, Narain Karthikeyan, Bruce Jouanny, Heikki Kovalainen, Robert Doornbos, Kosuke Matsuura, Pavlović and James Courtney. Katsuyuki Hiranaka was stranded across the turn at the Melco hairpin until marshals turned his car around. Fábio Carbone entered the corner too quickly, but he braked early to avoid a collision. Kerr hit the barrier at Fisherman's Bend, damaging his car's suspension and rear wing. Vitantonio Liuzzi went off the track and removed his car's left-hand corner.

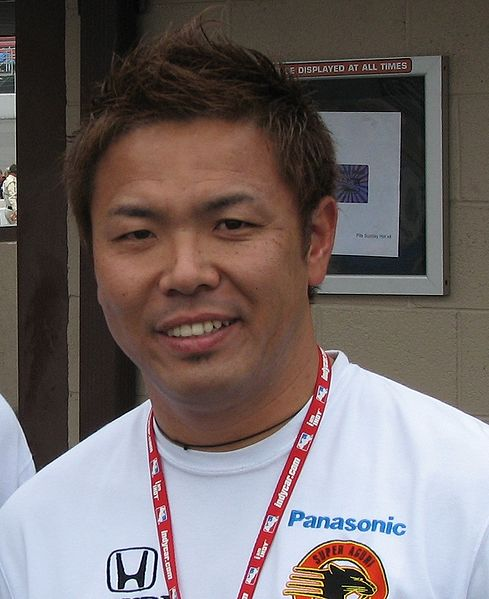
Kosuke Matsuura (pictured in 2007) was on provisional pole position after first qualifying but could not improve his time in second qualifying.

Qualifying was divided into two 45-minute sessions, one on Thursday afternoon and one on Friday afternoon. Each driver's fastest time from either session was used to determine their starting position in Sunday's race. Matsuura led the first qualifying session first with a 2:15.768 lap. Ide, who was eight-tenths of a second slower, waited until the final lap to take provisional second. Courtney pushed hard on his final timed lap to be the highest-placed rookie in third. Montin had provisional pole before dropping to fourth and taking the escape road at Lisboa. The unwell Kovalainen was as high as second but finished fifth. With five minutes to go, Gommendy collided with a barrier exiting Reservoir bend and bent his left-rear wheel bearing, denying him provisional pole. Karthikeyan was seventh, Doornbos eighth, and the French duo of Olivier Pla and Johanny were ninth and tenth. Renaud Derlot was the quickest driver not to enter the top ten. Following him were Richard Antinucci, Kogure and Pavlović, Marcel Costa, Carbone, Hiranaka, Alan van der Merwe, Hiroki Yoshimoto, César Campaniço, Ho, Lee, Tatsuya Kataoka, Kerr, Liuzzi, Cristiano Citron, Shinya Sato, Lei and Merszei. The only driver not to set a lap time was Ronnie Bremer due to a crash at San Francisco Bend turn. Yoshimoto and his fellow Japanese Kataoka glanced a wall beside the track. Yellow and oil flags were needed for Van Der Merwe's accident into a barrier at Dona Maria Bend corner. Kit Meng's subsequent heavy accident left debris on the track and stopped qualifying for two minutes. Kerr heavily damaged the rear of his car in a crash against the wall at Fisherman's Bend turn.

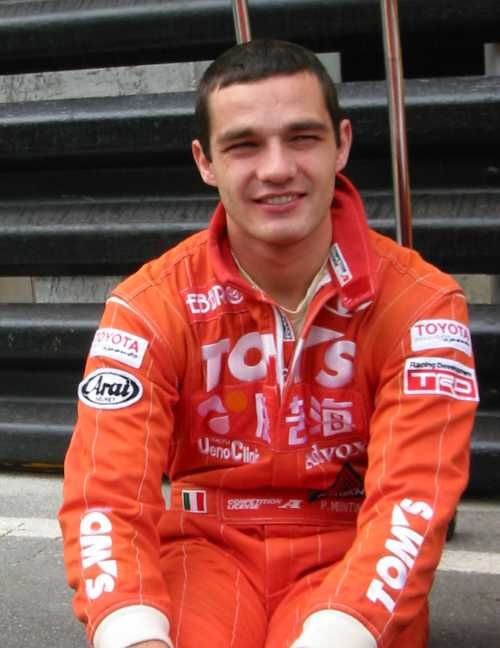
Paolo Montin took his first pole position in his fifth appearance at the Macau Grand Prix.

Jouanny set an early lap that was good enough to lead the field until Montin improved it in the second 30-minute practice session. A brief rain shower fell on parts of the circuit, causing several drivers to aquaplane as they returned to the pit lane. They waited for the circuit to dry before returning to it. Ide briefly led before Karthikeyan and, later, Montin took over. Despite a spin and lightly damaging his car's left-hand corner at Dona Maria Bend, Gommendy was fastest with a 2:16.569 lap. He was followed by Kovalainen, Montin, Pla, Ide, Campaniço, Courtney (driving with a misfiring engine), Karthikeyan, Carbone and Kerr. Pla lost control of his car late in the session and made minor contact with a barrier.

The start of the second qualifying session was delayed for 35 minutes due to multiple accidents in the Guia Race of Macau's third practice session that left cement dust, oil and debris to be cleared by marshals. A suggestion in the paddock that second qualifying was reduced to half an hour was dispelled and the full 45 minutes were held. Several drivers immediately began improving their laps and Montin led with a 2:14.995 lap in the 14th minute to displace Matsuura. He held it to claim pole position for the first time on his fifth appearance in Macau. Gommendy's team adjusted his car and he joined Montin on the grid's front row in spite of him crashing into a wall on his last try at going quicker and prematurely ending the session with 1 minute and 50 seconds left. Matsuura was the only driver in the top 26 not to improve his lap time and car problems left him third. Kovalainen moved to fourth and Karthikeyan got to fifth. Pla was the best-starting rookie in sixth. Carbone was as high as fourth before coming seventh and Ide fell six places from his provisional grid slot to start eighth. Rounding out the top ten were Jouanny and Hiranaka. Behind them the rest of the field consisted of Antinucci, Doornbos, Courtney, Bremer, Kogure, Kerr, Campaniço, Pavlović, Van Der Merwe, Costa, Derlot, Yoshimoto, Kataoka, Liuzzi, Lee, Citron, Ho, Sato, Lei and Merszei. The session's only other disruption came as Bremer entered the outside of the Reservoir bend and lost control of his car. He crashed sideways into a barrier and inflicted heavy damage to his vehicle's left-hand corner and suspension.

=== Qualifying classification ===
Each of the driver's fastest lap times from the two qualifying sessions are denoted in bold.

Final qualifying classification
Pos	No.	Driver	Team	Q1 Time	Rank	Q2 Time	Rank	Gap	Grid
1	18	(Italy) Paolo Montin	TOM'S	2:16.668	4	**2:14.995**	1	—	1
2	12	(France) Tristan Gommendy	ASM Formule 3	2:16.855	6	**2:15.657**	6	+0.662	2
3	6	(Japan) Kosuke Matsuura	Prema Powerteam	**2:15.768**	1	2:15.826	3	+0.773	3
4	21	(Finland) Heikki Kovalainen	Fortec Motorsport	2;16.733	5	**2:15.962**	4	+0.967	4
5	1	(India) Narain Karthikeyan	Carlin Motorsport	2:16.977	7	**2:16.078**	5	+1.083	5
6	11	(France) Olivier Pla	ASM Formule 3	2:17.527	9	**2:16.098**	6	+1.103	6
7	22	(Brazil) Fábio Carbone	Fortec Motorsport	2:18.955	16	**2:16.158**	7	+1.163	7
8	8	(Japan) Yuji Ide	Signature Team	2:16.586	2	**2:16.244**	8	+1.249	8
9	26	(France) Bruce Jouanny	Bruce Jouanny	2:17.556	3	**2:16.244**	9	+1.369	9
10	19	(Japan) Katsuyuki Hiranaka	TOM'S	2:19.088	17	**2:16.418**	10	+1.423	10
11	27	(United States) Richard Antinucci	Richard Antinucci	2:18.104	12	**2:16.481**	11	+1.486	11
12	30	(Netherlands) Robert Doornbos	Team Ghinzani	2:17.156	8	**2:16.549**	12	+1.554	12
13	2	(Australia) James Courtney	Carlin Motorsport	2:16.642	3	**2:16.551**	13	+1.556	13
14	36	(Denmark) Ronnie Bremer	Ronnie Bremer	—	30	**2:16.665**	14	+1.670	14
15	15	(Japan) Takashi Kogure	Mugen x Dome Project	2:18.546	13	**2:16.955**	15	+1.960	15
16	9	(United Kingdom) Robbie Kerr	Alan Docking Racing	2:20.611	24	**2:16.961**	16	+1.966	16
17	5	(Portugal) César Campaniço	Prema Powerteam	2:20.048	20	**2:17.041**	17	+2.047	17
18	17	(Serbia and Montenegro) Miloš Pavlović	Target Racing	2:18.764	14	**2:17.336**	18	+2.341	18
19	3	(South Africa) Alan van der Merwe	Carlin Motorsport	2:20.043	18	**2:17.424**	19	+2.429	19
20	31	(Spain) Marcel Costa	Team Ghinzani	2:18.891	15	**2:17.531**	20	+2.536	20
21	7	(France) Renaud Derlot	Signature Team	2:18.021	11	**2.17.706**	21	+2.711	21
22	20	(Japan) Hiroki Yoshimoto	Now Motorsport	2:20.045	19	**2:17.756**	22	+2.761	22
23	33	(Japan) Tatsuya Kataoka	Swiss Racing Team	2:20.538	23	**2:17.896**	23	+2.901	23
24	28	(Italy) Vitantonio Liuzzi	Kolles Racing	2:21.471	25	**2:18.432**	24	+3.437	24
25	38	(Hong Kong) Marchy Lee	Marchy Lee	2:20.441	22	**2:19.056**	25	+4.061	25
26	16	(Italy) Cristiano Citron	Target Racing	2:22.024	26	**2:19.875**	26	+4.880	26
27	29	(Macau) Michael Ho	Kolles Racing	**2:20.368**	21	2:20.682	27	+5.373	27
28	32	(Japan) Shinya Sato	Swiss Racing Team	**2:22.108**	28	13:11.587	30	+7.113	28
29	35	(Macau) Lei Kit Meng	Lei Kit Meng	**2:22.354**	29	2:23.041	28	+7.359	29
30	10	(Macau) Jo Merszei	Alan Docking Racing	2:25.280	30	**2:23.215**	29	+8.220	30
110% qualifying time: 2:28.494
**Bold time** indicates the faster of the two times that determined the grid order.

== Warm-up ==
A 20-minute warm-up session was held on the morning of the race. Montin set the session's fastest lap of 2:14.494. Karthikeyan was four-hundredths of a second slower in second and Carbone was third. Kataoka was fourth-fastest; his fellow Japanese Kogure was fifth and Doornbos sixth. Kerr was seventh-quickest, Costa eighth and the Japanese duo of Ide and Hiranaka were ninth and tenth.

== Race ==
Sunday's race was divided into two aggregate legs totalling 30 laps. The first 15-lap leg took place in the morning, and the results determined the starting order for the second leg, with the winner starting from pole position. Following that, a five-hour break was observed to allow for the intervening support races. Later in the afternoon, the second 15-lap leg began. The driver who completed all 30 laps in the quickest time won overall.

=== Leg 1 ===
The start of the first leg scheduled for 10:20 Macau Standard Time (UTC+08:00) on 17 November was delayed for five minutes due to several incidents during the Macau Asian Formula 2000 Challenge round that made the track dirty. When it did start in dry and cloudy weather, Gommendy took the lead from Montin as the field approached Mandarin Oriental Bend for the first time. A slow start dropped Kovalainen to fifth, as Gommendy lost the lead to Montin on the outside into Lisboa corner. Gommendy then made a minor error, allowing Matsuura to take second. Hiranaka appeared to lightly strike the wall and ricochet into Pla's path at the Lisboa turn. Pla swerved to avoid him but ran out of space and crashed, catching out Pavlović, Derlot, Courtney, Van Der Merwe, Merszei, and Kataoka. The safety car was deployed, and track marshals worked to move the wrecked cars involved in the accident. Costa made a pit stop on lap two, while the rest of the field drove slowly behind the safety car until it was withdrawn at the end of the fourth lap.

Montin made a quick restart after the safety car was withdrawn to maintain his lead over Matsuura. Karthikeyan then challenged Gommendy. The faster Doornbos passed Carbone for eighth place further down the field. Despite the fact that the safety car brought cars closer together, they were calmer than before despite localised yellow flags in various areas. Gommendy fell behind Matsuura and tried to repass only for the latter to keep third. Gommendy tried again and overtook Matsuura for third. At this point, Kovalainen set the fastest lap and overtook Karthikeyan for fourth. Doornbos overtook Jouanny for seventh and Kovalainen passed Matsuura into Lisboa corner for third. However, Mastuura clung onto the slipstream of Kovalainen's car and returned to third place. Despite passing Carbone for ninth, Kerr hit the barrier and lost positions. Karthikeyan got closer to Kovalainen as Gommendy drew closer to Montin. Lei's slower vehicle delayed Montin and Gommendy, who was followed by Matsuura, Kovalainen, Karthikeyan, Ide, and Doornbos.

Matsuura was unable to pass Kovalainen until he did so at Lisboa corner, and Karthikeyan's subsequent pass was blocked by Matsuura. On lap nine, Bremer drove off the track at Lisboa corner and crashed. Karthikeyan passed Matsuura on the next lap, and Kogure fell behind Carbone. Montin had now lapped Lei and was attempting to distance himself from Gommendy with a series of fastest laps. In a spin, Kovalainen damaged his rear wing in a spin on an uphill section from San Francisco Bend. Because Kovalainen's steering arm was damaged, he lost fourth to Karthikeyan. Campaniço passed Carbone for twelfth, while Ide passed Matsuura for fifth. Doornbos put Matsuura under heavy pressure, but he failed to pass him. Montin led the rest of the race to win the first leg and started the second leg from pole position joined by Gommendy in second. The final classified finishers were Karthikeyan, Kovalainen, Ide, Matsuura, Doornbos, Jouanny, Antinucci, Kerr, Kogure, Campaniço, Carbone, Costa, Yoshimoto, Lee, Hiranaka, Citron, Sato, Ho and Lei.

=== Leg 2 ===
The race's second leg began later that day at 15:40 local time, in cloudy and dry conditions. The driver who started from pole position lost the lead for the second consecutive leg as Montin narrowly avoided stalling his car, elevating Kovalainen to first place and Ide overtook Gommendy for second. Jouanny hit the armco barrier at Lisboa turn and ricocheted across the circuit. Kerr could not avoid him despite turning right and ran into his car. Carbone was also collected and the accident prompted the safety car's deployment for debris clearing by marshals. When the safety car was withdrawn on lap three, Kovalainen held off Ide on the run to Mandarin Oriental Bend to maintain his lead. Kovalainen began to pull away from the rest of the field. Lei went off at Lisboa Corner but restarted his car and continued driving. Doornbos repeated the manoeuvre on the next lap and returned to the track without incident. Meanwhile, Montin attacked Kogure, and Ide was under pressure from Gommendy, who was passed by Karthikeyan, but Gommendy quickly retook his former position.

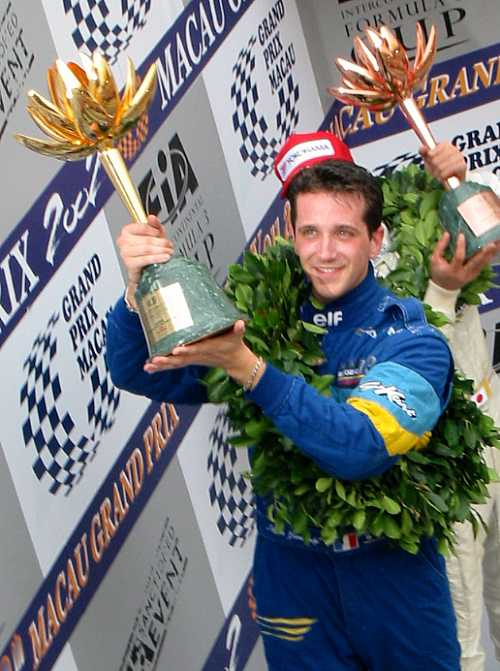
Tristan Gommendy celebrating winning the Macau Grand Prix on the podium.

On lap four, Karthikeyan crashed into the wall leaving Maternity Bend corner and retired. Although Kovalainen continued to pull away with a series of fastest laps, Ide began speeding up and Kovalainen responded by increasing his lead at the front to half a second. On lap eight at Mandarin Oriental Bend, Gommendy passed Ide for second. Campaniço was surprised by Costa passing him on the straight and lost his front wing against the wall at Lisboa corner. At the front Kovalainen again tried to establish a small lead when Gommendy drew close to him due to a more powerful engine. On lap nine, Ide was passed for third by fellow Japanese Matsuura as the two avoided a collision into Lisboa turn. Ide drove onto the turn's escape road after unsuccessfully blocking Matsuura due to the momentum of the latter's overtake. Matsuura continued until he spun at Dona Maria Bend and retired after a crash against the wall. This promoted Montin to third but the crash prompted the safety car's second deployment.

Gommendy overtook Kovalainen for the lead at Lisboa corner at the restart on lap 12. Montin sought to pass Kogure for third though Kogure blocked him. That caused Montin to spin at Lisboa turn and Antinucci and then Ide collected him. Consequently, all three drivers retired. Kovalainen locked his tyres heavily and Kogure overtook him for second. However, Kogure did not keep second for long as Kovalainen retook the position but was now out of contention to win. Thus, Gommendy led the rest of the leg for overall victory. Kovalainen finished second, 2.104 seconds back, and Kogure took third place. Hiranaka, Yoshimoto, Doornbos, Lee, Citron, Ho, and Campaniço completed the top ten. Sato and Lei were the final classified finishers. Overall, 17 out of the 30 entered cars were not classified in the final results.

=== Race classification ===
Final race classification
Pos	No.	Driver	Team	Laps	Time/Retired	Grid
1	12	(France) Tristan Gommendy	ASM Formule 3	30	1:18.03:202	2
2	21	(Finland) Heikki Kovalainen	Fortec Motorsport	30	+2.104	4
3	15	(Japan) Takashi Kogure	Mugen x Dome Project	30	+3.098	15
4	19	(Japan) Katsuyuki Hiranaka	TOM'S	30	+5.613	10
5	20	(Japan) Hiroki Yoshimoto	Now Motorsport	30	+13.116	22
6	30	(Netherlands) Robert Doornbos	Team Ghinzani	30	+15.131	12
7	38	(Hong Kong) Marchy Lee	Marchy Lee	30	+26.112	25
8	16	(Italy) Cristiano Citron	Target Racing	30	+37.642	26
9	29	(Macau) Michael Ho	Kolles Racing	30	+38.149	27
10	5	(Portugal) César Campaniço	Prema Powerteam	30	+38.701	17
11	32	(Japan) Shinya Sato	Swiss Racing Team	28	+2 Laps	28
12	35	(Macau) Lei Kit Meng	Lei Kit Meng	27	+3 Laps	29
Ret	18	(Italy) Paolo Montin	TOM'S	26	Accident in leg 2	1
Ret	27	(United States) Richard Antinucci	Richard Antinucci	26	Accident in leg 2	11
Ret	8	(Japan) Yuji Ide	Signature Team	26	Accident in leg 2	8
Ret	31	(Spain) Marcel Costa	Team Ghinzani	26	Accident in leg 2	20
Ret	6	(Japan) Kosuke Matsuura	Prema Powerteam	23	Spin in leg 2	3
Ret	28	(Italy) Vitantonio Liuzzi	Kolles Racing	23	Not classified	24
Ret	1	(India) Narain Karthikeyan	Carlin Motorsport	18	Not classified	5
Ret	36	(Denmark) Ronnie Bremer	Ronnie Bremer	15	Crash in leg 1	14
Ret	2	(Australia) James Courtney	Carlin Motorsport	15	Crash in leg 1	13
Ret	17	(Serbia and Montenegro) Miloš Pavlović	Target Racing	15	Accident in leg 1	18
Ret	11	(France) Olivier Pla	ASM Formule 3	15	Accident in leg 1	6
Ret	33	(Japan) Tatsuya Kataoka	Swiss Racing Team	15	Accident in leg 1	23
Ret	3	(South Africa) Alan van der Merwe	Carlin Motorsport	15	Accident in leg 1	19
Ret	10	(Macau) Jo Merszei	Alan Docking Racing	15	Accident in leg 1	30
Ret	7	(France) Renaud Derlot	Signature Team	1	Accident in leg 1	21
Ret	26	(France) Bruce Jouanny	Bruce Jouanny	1	Accident in leg 2	9
Ret	22	(Brazil) Fábio Carbone	Fortec Motorsport	1	Accident in leg 2	7
Ret	9	(United Kingdom) Robbie Kerr	Alan Docking Racing	1	Accident in leg 2	16
Fastest lap: Tristan Gommendy, 2:14.036 164.37 km/h (102.13 mph) on lap 8 (leg 2)
