= 2005 Macau Grand Prix =

Formula Three motor race

Race details
Date	20 November 2005
Official name	52nd Macau Grand Prix
Location	Guia Circuit, Macau
Course	Temporary street circuit 6.120 km (3.803 mi)
Distance	Qualifying Race; 10 laps, 61.200 km (38.028 mi); Main Race; 15 laps, 91.800 km (57.042 mi)
Weather	Qualifying Race: Sunny and dry Main Race: Sunny and dry
- Qualifying Race

Pole
Driver	(France) Loïc Duval	ASM Formule 3
Time	2:11.348

Fastest Lap
Driver	(Poland) Robert Kubica	Carlin Motorsport
Time	2:12.003 (on lap 8 of 10)

Podium
First	(France) Loïc Duval	ASM Formule 3
Second	(Poland) Robert Kubica	Carlin Motorsport
Third	(Brazil) Lucas di Grassi	Manor Motorsport
- Main Race

Pole
Driver	(France) Loïc Duval	ASM Formule 3

Fastest Lap
Driver	(France) Loïc Duval	ASM Formule 3
Time	2:11.929, (on lap 9 of 15)

Podium
First	(Brazil) Lucas di Grassi	Manor Motorsport
Second	(Poland) Robert Kubica	Carlin Motorsport
Third	(Germany) Sebastian Vettel	ASM Formule 3

The 2005 Macau Grand Prix (formally the 52nd Macau Grand Prix) was a Formula Three (F3) motor race held on the streets of Macau on 20 November 2005. Unlike other races, such as the Masters of Formula 3, the 2005 Macau Grand Prix was not a part of any F3 championship, but was open to entries from all F3 championships. The race itself consisted of two races: a ten-lap qualifying race to set the starting grid for the fifteen-lap main race. The Macau Grand Prix took place for the 52nd time in 2005, and the 23rd time for F3 cars.

Manor Motorsport's Lucas di Grassi won the Grand Prix after finishing third in the previous day's qualification race won by ASM Formule 3's Loïc Duval. After Duval was penalised for a jump start, Di Grassi took the lead and held it until Carlin Motorsport's Robert Kubica passed him on lap ten. After three laps behind the safety car due to a three-car accident at Faraway Hill corner, di Grassi retook the lead from Kubica on lap 14 and held it for the rest of the race to achieve the first victory in Macau for a Brazilian driver since Maurício Gugelmin in the 1985 edition. Second was Kubica while third was the highest-placed rookie Sebastian Vettel of ASM Formule 3.

== Background and entry list ==
The Macau Grand Prix is a Formula Three (F3) race considered to be a stepping stone to higher motor racing categories such as Formula One and has been termed the territory's most prestigious international sporting event. The 2005 Macau Grand Prix was the event's 52nd running and the 23rd time it was run under F3 rules. It took place on the 6.2 km (3.9 mi) 22-turn Guia Circuit on 21 November 2005 with three preceding days of practice and qualifying.

Drivers had to race in a Fédération Internationale de l'Automobile (FIA)-championship event in 2005, either in the FIA Formula 3 International Trophy or one of the domestic championships, with the highest-placed drivers getting priority in being invited to the race. Only one of the three major F3 championships was represented in the 30-car grid. The only champion in Macau was João Paulo de Oliveira from the Japanese series, as McLaren advised Formula 3 Euro Series winner and early pre-race favourite Lewis Hamilton to skip the race and plan for 2006. Furthermore, the champion of the British Formula Three International Series Álvaro Parente had an A1GP commitment in Malaysia. Thus the best performing drivers from the Euro and British series' were Lucas di Grassi and Charlie Kimball respectively. The only driver from outside of F3 to race in Macau was Robert Kubica, the Formula Renault 3.5 Series champion. The race organisers invited five Macanese drivers to compete. They were Rodolfo Ávila, Michael Ho, Jo Merszei, Lou Meng Cheong and Lei Kit Meng.

== Practice and qualifying ==
The race on Sunday was preceded by two half-hour practice sessions, one on Thursday morning and one on Friday morning. Ombra Racing's Paolo Montin had minor brake issues but lapped fastest with a minute left at 2 minutes, 14.192 seconds. Di Grassi of Manor Motorsport was 0.210 seconds behind in second, followed by Sebastian Vettel, Kazuki Nakajima, Loïc Duval, Kubica, de Oliveira, Franck Perera, Naoki Yokomizo and Fábio Carbone. Most drivers avoided an incident except for Dan Clarke, who was stranded at the Melco hairpin and Cheong removed one of his car's wheels in a collision against a trackside wall.

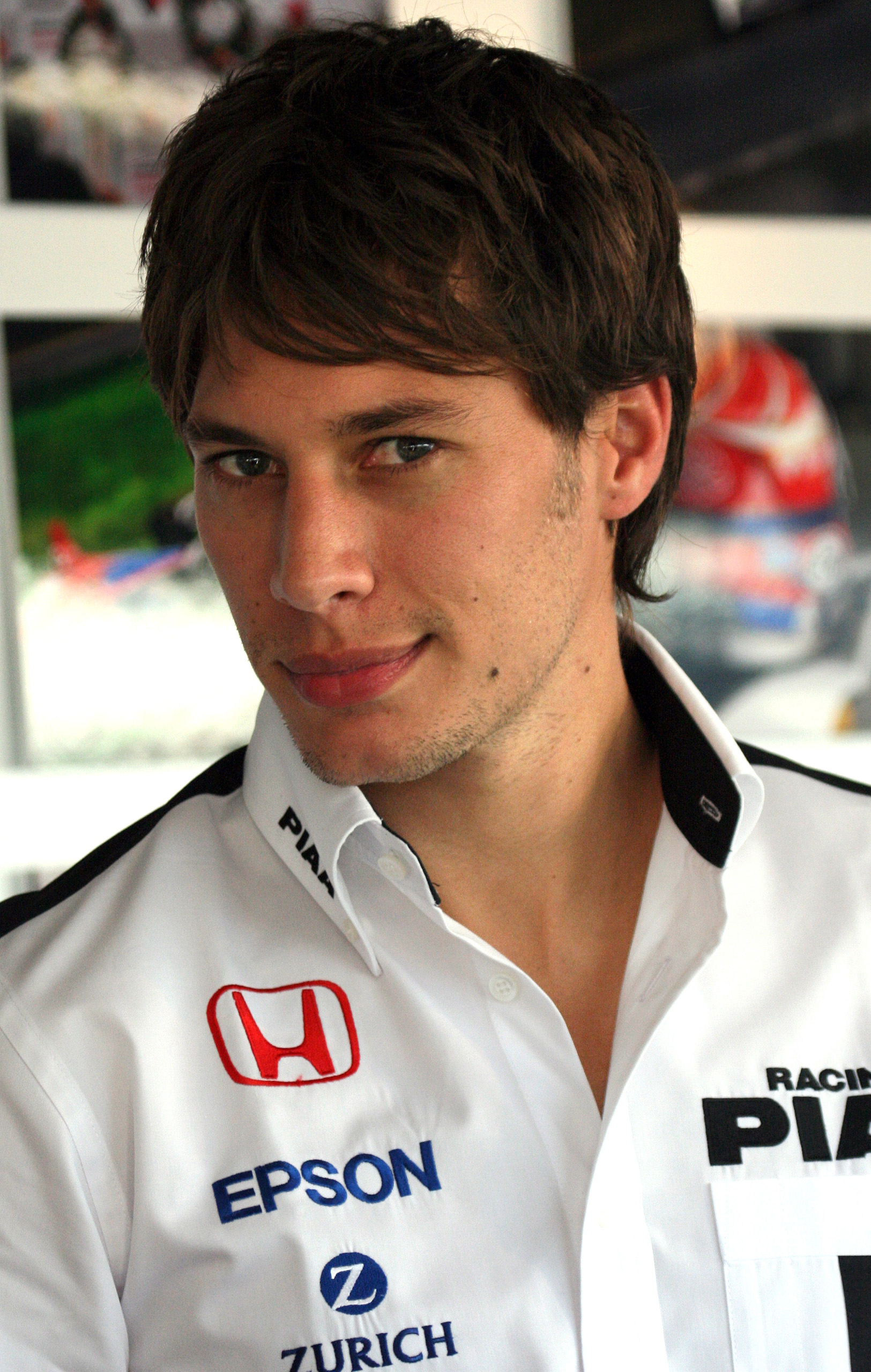
Loïc Duval (pictured in 2009) took pole position in the final eleven minutes of the second qualifying session and won the subsequent qualification race.

Qualifying was split into two 45-minute sessions, one on Thursday afternoon and one on Friday afternoon. Each driver's fastest time from either session counted toward their final starting place in the qualification race. The first qualifying session was delayed by 20 minutes because Jonny Cocker crashed during practice for the Porsche Carrera Cup Asia race and created a large dent in a barrier beside the track. When it did start, Duval, who moved from Signature Team to fill in for Hamilton at Macau, was the early pace setter but Kubica resolved a loose seat and car set-up issues to steadily move up the order and top the time sheets with qualifying's final lap at 2 minutes, 12.754 seconds. Di Grassi led for ten minutes before Kubica demoted him to second. Duval finished third. Carbone set a late lap that put him in fourth place. Yokomizo went up the order to claim fifth and Watts finished in sixth. De Oliviera, seventh, challenged Duval early in qualifying, Conway was the highest-placed rookie in eighth, Kohei Hirate was ninth and Perera was tenth. Nakajima was the fastest man not to get into the top ten but was ahead of Vettel. The rest of the order was Romain Grosjean, Montin, Christian Bakkerud, Guillaume Moreau, Bruno Senna, Daisuke Ikeda, Kimball, Karl Reindler, Taku Bamba, Clarke, Filip Salaquarda, Ávila, Ho, Stephen Jelley, Lei, Merszei, Cheong and Steven Kane who set just one timed lap due to an oil leak. Qualifying was briefly halted by yellow flags after Cheong collided with the wall at San Francisco Bend turn and Nakajima removed his front suspension at Moorish Hill corner.

Perera was ordered to meet the stewards after qualifying for missing the red light signal instructing him to enter the weighbridge. All of his lap times were deleted. De Oliviera traded the top spot with several drivers during the second half-hour practice session, eventually lapping fastest with a time of 2 minutes, 12.708 seconds with 16 minutes remaining. Conway continued to improve his pace by going second quickest and was a little more than four-hundredths of a second slower than de Oliviera. Duval, Kubica, Perera, di Grassi, Yokomizo, Clarke, Kimball and Montin were in positions four to ten. Officials stopped practice with five minutes left due to two concurrent accidents. Bakkerud spun backwards into the Dona Maria Bend corner tyre wall and Senna struck the barrier, removing his car's right-hand wheel on the drive down the hill leaving Teddy Yip Bend corner. Kane ended the session early after hitting the Moorish Hill barrier.

For sure it was a very difficult session and there was a lot of traffic. I felt I could be on pole here and although I know it is sometimes not best to be on pole position for the first race, because of the long straight after the start, I still hope to have a good race."

— Loïc Duval, after clinching pole position during the second qualifying session held on Friday.

The second qualifying session was stopped early on when Carbone entered the start/finish line straight too fast, glanced a barrier at the exit of the Reservoir Bend corner, and was stranded in the centre of the track. Almost immediately after the restart, a multi-car collision between Clarke, Salaquarda and Moreau at Police Bend turn prompted a second red flag, and a third was prompted by Kimball, whose spin at the same corner made the track impassable. The last stoppage came when de Oliviera crashed into a wall. Kubica held pole position early on until Duval took it with eleven minutes remaining and maintained it until the end of qualifying with a new unofficial lap record of 2 minutes, 11.348 seconds. Di Grassi qualified second with a last-minute lap despite the lack of a slipstream on the main straight. Kubica improved his lap but fell to third, while Conway gained four places to fourth despite a crash into the Police Bend barrier soon after. Perera took fifth and Montin gained eight places to join him provisionally on the grid's third row. De Oliviera maintained seventh, Nakajima moved to eighth and his teammate Carbone and Moreau completed the top ten qualifiers. Behind them the rest of the field lined up as Yokomizo, Vettel, Kimball, Watts, Bakkerud, Hirate, Reindler, Bamba, Clarke, Grosjean, Jelley, Senna, Ikeda, Kane, Ávila, Salaquarda, Ho, Cheong, Lei and Merszei. After the session, the stewards ruled that di Grassi, Perera, and Reindler had not slowed sufficiently under yellow flag conditions for de Oliviera's crash and deleted their two quickest qualifying laps.

=== Qualifying classification ===
Each of the driver's fastest lap times from the two qualifying sessions are denoted in bold.

Final qualifying classification
Pos	No.	Driver	Team	Q1 Time	Rank	Q2 Time	Rank	Gap	Grid
1	1	(France) Loïc Duval	ASM Formule 3	2:13.114	3	**2:11.348**	1		1
2	8	(Brazil) Lucas di Grassi	Manor Motorsport	2:13.081	2	**2:11.913**	2	+0.565	4^{2}
3	5	(Poland) Robert Kubica	Carlin Motorsport	2:12.754	1	**2:12.163**	3	+0.815	2
4	9	(United Kingdom) Mike Conway	Manor Motorsport	2:14.422	8	**2:12.454**	4	+0.906	3
5	11	(France) Franck Perera	Prema Powerteam	2:14.665	10	**2:13.228**	5	+1.880	21^{1}^{2}
6	19	(Italy) Paolo Montin	Ombra Racing	2:14.930	14	**2:13.236**	6	+1.888	5
7	3	(Brazil) João Paulo de Oliveira	TOM'S	2:14.246	7	**2:13.247**	7	+1.899	6
8	4	(Japan) Kazuki Nakajima	TOM'S	2:14.701	11	**2:13.273**	8	+1.925	7
9	16	(Brazil) Fábio Carbone	Signature	**2:13.306**	4	2:14.806	9	+1.958	8
10	15	(France) Guillaume Moreau	Signature-Plus	2:15.037	16	**2:13.337**	10	+1.989	9
11	10	(Japan) Naoki Yokomizo	ThreeBond Racing	2:13.830	5	**2:13.515**	11	+2.167	10
12	2	(Germany) Sebastian Vettel	ASM Formule 3	2:14.800	12	**2:13.593**	12	+2.245	11
13	6	(United States) Charlie Kimball	Carlin Motorsport	2:16.182	19	**2:14.000**	13	+2.652	12
14	24	(United Kingdom) Danny Watts	Team Midland Euroseries	2:14.066	6	**2:14.031**	14	+2.683	13
15	7	(Denmark) Christian Bakkerud	Carlin Motorsport	2:14.952	15	**2:14.127**	15	+2.779	14
16	20	(Japan) Kohei Hirate	Team Rosberg	2:14.591	9	**2:14.280**	16	+2.932	15
17	30	(Australia) Karl Reindler	Alan Docking Racing	2:16.327	20	**2:14.283**	17	+2.935	18^{2}
18	27	(Japan) Taku Bamba	Now Motor Sports	2:16.552	21	**2:14.728**	18	+3.380	16
19	12	(United Kingdom) Dan Clarke	Prema Powerteam	2:17.125	22	**2:14.768**	19	+3.420	17
20	14	(France) Romain Grosjean	Signature-Plus	**2:14.847**	13	2:15.068	20	+3.499	19
21	22	(United Kingdom) Stephen Jelley	Menu F3 Motorsport	2:18.700	26	**2:15.083**	21	+3.735	20
22	28	(Brazil) Bruno Senna	Double R Racing	**2:15.520**	17	2:17.461	22	+4.172	22
23	26	(Japan) Daisuke Ikeda	ZAP Speed	2:16.021	18	**2:15.891**	23	+4.543	23
24	21	(United Kingdom) Steven Kane	Promatecme F3	2:26.409	30	**2:16.052**	24	+4.704	24
25	18	(Macau) Rodolfo Ávila	HBR Motorsport	2:17.847	24	**2:17.219**	25	+5.871	25
26	17	(Czech Republic) Filip Salaquarda	HBR Motorsport	2:17.588	23	**2:17.574**	26	+6.226	26
27	23	(Macau) Michael Ho	Team Midland Euroseries	2:18.662	25	**2:18.117**	27	+6.769	27
28	32	(Macau) Lou Meng Cheong	Edenbridge Racing	2:24.588	29	**2:19.887**	28	+8.539	28
29	33	(Macau) Lei Kit Meng	Swiss Racing Team	**2:22.497**	27	2:22.670	29	+11.149	29
30	29	(Macau) Jo Merszei	Jo Merszei	**2:24.177**	28	2:27.415	30	+12.829	30
110% qualifying time: 2:24.482
**Bold time** indicates the faster of the two times that determined the grid order.

- **^1** – Franck Perera had his fastest two lap times from the first qualifying session invalidated for missing the weighbridge.
- **^2** – Lucas di Grassi, Franck Perera and Karl Reindler had their two best lap times in the second qualification session deleted for failing to slow under yellow flag conditions.

== Warm-up one ==
A 20-minute warm-up session was held on the morning of the qualifying race. Perera continued go quicker with the session's fastest lap of 2 minutes, 13.185 seconds. Montin's fastest lap was 0.308 seconds slower in second. Conway, Duval, Carbone, Yokomizo, Kubica, Vettel, de Oliviera and Hirate followed in positions three through ten.

== Qualification race ==
The qualifying race to set the starting order for the main race began in dry, sunny weather on 19 November at 13:40 Macau Standard Time (UTC+08:00) on 19 November. During a pre-race reconnaissance lap, Bamba entered Reservoir Bend too quickly and collided with the rear of Cheong's car, which had come to a stop in its grid slot. Both cars suffered suspension damage and were unable to start the race. Furthermore, Cheong's vehicle was pushed forward, injuring an unidentified female. Duval had a poor start, but Kubica was quicker off the line and took the lead on the drive to Mandarin Oriental Bend. However, Duval reclaimed first place from Kubica entering Lisboa turn, as the latter failed to hold him off and instead focused on avoiding risks and preserving his car for Sunday's race. Di Grassi outdragged teammate Conway into Reservoir turn and backed out of an attempt to pass Kubica on the outside pass. Carbone fell from ninth to nineteenth by the end of the first lap, while Watts gained five places entering Lisboa corner to eighth.

Duval pulled away from Kubica and led by two seconds at the end of lap two, while Conway and di Grassi battled for third and Montin battled de Oliviera for fifth. Senna stopped at Teddy Yip Bend turn on that lap due to an engine failure, and red and yellow striped flags displayed due to the possibility of oil being laid there. Elsewhere down the order, Vettel passed Moreau and began to close in on Watts as Kimball, Yokomizo, and Bakkerud battled it out. Carbone lost control of his car at the San Francisco Bend corner, narrowly avoiding a collision with a barrier alongside the track. Vettel passed Watts and into eighth place, but only for a few seconds before Watts reclaimed it. Approaching the conclusion of lap four, di Grassi made an error that lost him momentum but he held off Conway. Bakkerud overtook Yokomizo and Kimball at the Reservoir Bend corner, but Kimball retook the position entering the straight linking the Mandarin Oriental Bend and Lisboa turns.

While most cars were fairly spread out in front, getting through traffic was not a major issue, but Cheong significantly delayed Kubica at the Melco hairpin, who had a poor-handling car due to one of his wheels buckled from the accident with Bamba. Kubica lapped Cheong after waiting until he was on a wider section of the track. More overtakes occurred in the race's final laps, as Montin was passed by de Oliviera, Vettel overtook Watts, and Kimball and Bakkerud traded tenth place twice. Watts blocked Kimball from passing at Lisboa corner as Moreau overtook Bakkerud. Kimball then overtook Watts at Lisboa turn on the next lap. Cheong retired in the Lisboa turn escape road on the final lap. Kubica closed up to Duval but chose not to take risks and Duval slowed slightly to win the qualification race and pole position for the Grand Prix by 1.577 seconds. Di Grassi was third, Conway fourth and Montin fifth. De Oliviera, Nakajima, Vettel, Kimball and Watts completed the top ten. The final order was Bakkerud, Moreau, Clarke, Yokomizo, Perera, Grosjean, Reindler, Kane, Carbone, Ikeda, Jelley, Hirate, Salaquarda, Ávila, Ho, Merszei and Lei.

=== Qualification race classification ===
Final qualifying race classification
Pos	No.	Driver	Team	Laps	Time/Retired	Grid
1	1	(France) Loïc Duval	ASM Formule 3	10	22:19.317	1
2	5	(Poland) Robert Kubica	Carlin Motorsport	10	+1.577	2
3	8	(Brazil) Lucas di Grassi	Manor Motorsport	10	+7.391	4
4	9	(United Kingdom) Mike Conway	Manor Motorsport	10	+8.180	3
5	19	(Italy) Paolo Montin	Ombra Racing	10	+14.368	5
6	3	(Brazil) João Paulo de Oliveira	TOM'S	10	+15.041	6
7	4	(Japan) Kazuki Nakajima	TOM'S	10	+21.546	7
8	2	(Germany) Sebastian Vettel	ASM Formule 3	10	+22.161	11
9	6	(United States) Charlie Kimball	Carlin Motorsport	10	+27.704	12
10	24	(United Kingdom) Danny Watts	Team Midland Euroseries	10	+28.775	13
11	7	(Denmark) Christian Bakkerud	Carlin Motorsport	10	+29.031	14
12	15	(France) Guillaume Moreau	Signature-Plus	10	+29.870	9
13	12	(United Kingdom) Dan Clarke	Prema Powerteam	10	+30.139	17
14	10	(Japan) Naoki Yokomizo	ThreeBond Racing	10	+30.862	10
15	11	(France) Franck Perera	Prema Powerteam	10	+31.336	21
16	14	(France) Romain Grosjean	Signature-Plus	10	+32.047	19
17	30	(Australia) Karl Reindler	Alan Docking Racing	10	+32.653	18
18	21	(United Kingdom) Steven Kane	Promatecme F3	10	+33.361	24
19	16	(Brazil) Fábio Carbone	Signature	10	+44.196	8
20	26	(Japan) Daisuke Ikeda	ZAP Speed	10	+45.059	23
21	22	(United Kingdom) Stephen Jelley	Menu F3 Motorsport	10	+46.986	20
22	20	(Japan) Kohei Hirate	Team Rosberg	10	+54.855	15
23	17	(Czech Republic) Filip Salaquarda	HBR Motorsport	10	+1:02.670	26
24	18	(Macau) Rodolfo Ávila	HBR Motorsport	10	+1:10.114	25
25	23	(Macau) Michael Ho	Team Midland Euroseries	10	+1:15.428	27
26	29	(Macau) Jo Merszei	Jo Merszei	9	+1 lap	30
27	31	(Macau) Lei Kit Meng	Swiss Racing Team	9	+1 lap	29
Ret	23	(Macau) Lou Meng Cheong	Edenbridge Racing	4	Steering	28
Ret	28	(Brazil) Bruno Senna	Double R Racing	1	Engine	22
EX	27	(Japan) Taku Bamba	Now Motor Sports	0	Excluded	16^{3}
Fastest lap: Robert Kubica, 2:12.003, 166.90 km/h (103.71 mph) on lap 8

- ^3 – Taku Bamba was barred from competing in the Grand Prix for causing an incident with Lou Meng Cheong on the grid.

== Warm-up two ==
Bamba was summoned to the stewards' office following the qualifying race to explain the incident with Cheong. The stewards banned Bamba from Sunday's main race for causing "an avoidable collision." The second 20-minute warm-up session took place on the morning of the main race. Di Grassi was quickest with a lap of 2 minutes, 11.953 seconds with Duval 0.973 seconds slower in second. Perera, Conway, Yokomizo, Vettel, Watts, Senna, Ikeda and Grosjean made up positions three through ten. Moreau crashed heavily midway through the session at Reservoir Bend, but his team rebuilt his car before the race.

== Main race ==
The race was delayed from its 15:45 start time on 20 November due to multiple incidents in the Asian Formula Renault Challenge race and the 2005 Guia Race of Macau. When it did begin in dry and sunny weather, Duval moved slightly before the five red lights went out. When he realised his mistake, he stopped in front of the line marking his grid slot. This did not deter Duval from making a quick start, as Kubica followed suit. Kubica failed to overtake Duval on the drive to Lisboa corner, as everyone passed without incident. Watts lost positions further down the order, and Vettel passed Montin for fourth. Conway collided with Montin's rear, causing a slow tyre puncture. Meanwhile, by the end of the first lap, Duval had established a 2.2-second lead. The stewards announced the following lap that Duval had jumped the start. Duval continued to increase his lead by a second per lap in order to strategically minimise his loss of position. On lap two, di Grassi turned left onto the outside into Lisboa corner and overtook Kubica for second. Senna and Hirate retired behind them after colliding at the Melco hairpin and temporarily blocking the track.

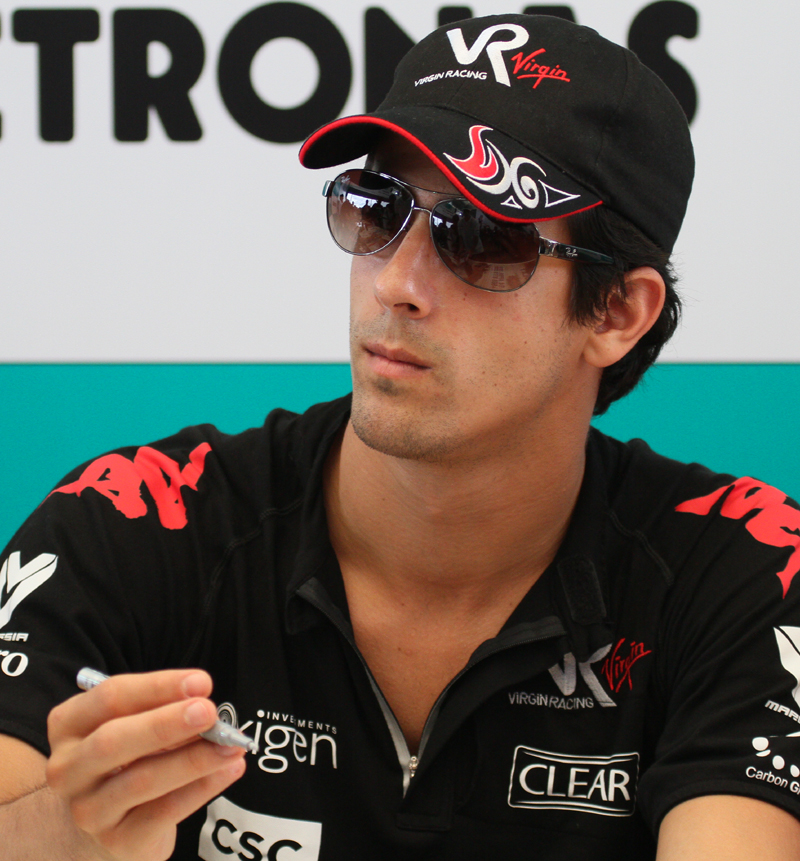
Lucas di Grassi (pictured in 2010) took the lead from Kubica on the penultimate lap and became the first Brazilian driver to win the Macau Grand Prix since Maurício Gugelmin in 1985

Conway slowed en route to the pit lane to have his punctured tyre replaced and he rejoined down the order. Perera advanced through the field and unsuccessfully challenged Bakkerud for tenth. Kimball was defending against the faster de Oliviera, while di Grassi was blocking Kubica's attempts to pass him. During laps four and five, Salaquarda retired in the pit lane with an unspecified problem, and Yokomizo missed the braking point for Lisboa corner and crashed into the wall. Just as officials were about to disqualify Duval by waving the black flag, he entered the pit lane at the start of lap six, ending his chances of becoming the fourth Frenchman in a row to win in Macau. Duval emerged in the centre of a pack of cars led by Watts in tenth. Di Grassi took the lead from Kubica second as Clarke passed Kimball for seventh. Jelley lost most of his front wing after colliding with Reindler's vehicle and delaying a small pack of cars. Kubica attempted to overtake di Grassi on the outside on the eighth lap but lost control of his car and narrowly avoided dropping out of contention.

Kubica gently nudged di Grassi at the Melco hairpin and fell back to give himself more space before attempting a second time.Further down the order Duval passed Watts and began to draw closer to Kimball after Watts declined to duel Duval. Jelley's car gave way and slid into the barrier as he drove into Reservoir Bend. The race was not disrupted and the traffic jam dispersed because Jelley was in a section of track that was not dangerous to others. A slower car impeded di Grassi as the leaders entered Mandarin Bend to begin lap ten, and Kubica tucked into his slipstream. Kubica took the lead on the outside of di Grassi into the Lisboa turn. Kubica began to pull away immediately, with de Oliviera taking fourth from Montin and Duval passing Kimball and Clarke to take sixth. Clarke attempted to follow Duval through the next set of turns, but he braked too late and collided with the barrier at Faraway Hill. Kimball incorrectly guessed the direction Clarke was going and the two collided. Watts collected them and slid into an wall before stopping several yards down the track.

I really love my country. I am trying to rebuild the Brazilian spirit. Senna won in 1983 and [Mauricio] Gugelmin won in 1985. I am really pleased to be the first from my country in 20 years to win here and it feels very good. France won it too many times [three years straight]. We needed to break their domination and I did it today. I knew it was going to be either me or Robert [Kubica] to break the domination. I managed to do the job. I really don't know why it took so long for a Brazilian to win here. Maybe there weren't enough Brazilians. I had the opportunity and I won it. This is my biggest win so far in my career.

— Lucas di Grassi on winning the 23rd Macau Grand Prix held to Formula Three regulations.

Because cars were deemed to be in a dangerous position and rescue workers were required at the Faraway Hill turn, the safety car was dispatched, and Kubica's lead of 1.612 seconds was reduced to nothing, and he could not win comfortably. Cheong entered the pit lane under the safety car to retire for unknown reasons, while Carbone made a pit stop but lost no time to the leaders. At the start of lap 14, the safety car was withdrawn, and racing resumed. Di Grassi saw an opportunity to pass leader Kubica entering Mandarin Bend and took it. Kane spun that lap and was unable to restart his car due to an overheating engine.. On his second appearance in Macau, it was di Grassi's victory, achieving the first win for a Brazilian driver in Macau since Maurício Gugelmin won the 1985 race. Despite applying significant pressure to di Grassi, Kubica was unable to overtake him and finished second, 0.659 seconds behind, with Vettel completing the podium as the highest-placed rookie in third. Off the podium, de Oliviera took fourth, Nakajima came fifth and Duval sixth. Bakkerud took seventh from Montin at the line and Grosjean and Perera completed the top ten. Moreau, Carbone, Reindler and Conway filled positions 11 to 14. Ho moved up ten places from his starting position to come 15th and Ávila, Ikeda, Lei, Merszei and Kane were the final finishers.

=== Main Race classification ===
Final main race classification
Pos	No.	Driver	Team	Laps	Time/Retired	Grid
1	8	(Brazil) Lucas di Grassi	Manor Motorsport	15	40:49.730	3
2	5	(Poland) Robert Kubica	Carlin Motorsport	15	+0.659	2
3	2	(Germany) Sebastian Vettel	ASM Formule 3	15	+3.924	8
4	3	(Brazil) João Paulo de Oliveira	TOM'S	15	+7.003	7
5	4	(Japan) Kazuki Nakajima	TOM'S	15	+8.619	7
6	1	(France) Loïc Duval	ASM Formule 3	15	+8.705	1
7	7	(Denmark) Christian Bakkerud	Carlin Motorsport	15	+11.185	11
8	19	(Italy) Paolo Montin	Ombra Racing	15	+12.490	8
9	14	(France) Romain Grosjean	Signature-Plus	15	+13.007	16
10	11	(France) Franck Perera	Prema Powerteam	15	+13.290	15
11	15	(France) Guillaume Moreau	Signature-Plus	15	+13.890	12
12	16	(Brazil) Fábio Carbone	Signature	15	+16.445	19
13	30	(Australia) Karl Reindler	Alan Docking Racing	15	+17.334	17
14	9	(United Kingdom) Mike Conway	Manor Motorsport	15	+17.808	4
15	23	(Macau) Michael Ho	Team Midland Euroseries	15	+26.120	25
16	18	(Macau) Rodolfo Ávila	HBR Motorsport	15	+28.615	24
17	26	(Japan) Daisuke Ikeda	ZAP Speed	14	+1 lap	20
18	31	(Macau) Lei Kit Meng	Swiss Racing Team	14	+1 lap	27
19	29	(Macau) Jo Merszei	Jo Merszei	14	+1 lap	26
20	21	(United Kingdom) Steven Kane	Promatecme F3	13	+2 laps	23
Ret	23	(Macau) Lou Meng Cheong	Edenbridge Racing	10	Retired	28
Ret	12	(United Kingdom) Dan Clarke	Prema Powerteam	9	Retired	13
Ret	6	(United States) Charlie Kimball	Carlin Motorsport	9	Retired	9
Ret	24	(United Kingdom) Danny Watts	Team Midland Euroseries	9	Retired	10
Ret	22	(United Kingdom) Stephen Jelley	Menu F3 Motorsport	8	Retired	21
Ret	10	(Japan) Naoki Yokomizo	ThreeBond Racing	4	Retired	14
Ret	17	(Czech Republic) Filip Salaquarda	HBR Motorsport	3	Retired	23
Ret	20	(Japan) Kohei Hirate	Team Rosberg	1	Retired	22
Ret	28	(Brazil) Bruno Senna	Double R Racing	1	Retired	29
Fastest lap: Loïc Duval, 2:11.929, 166.99 km/h (103.76 mph) on lap 9
