= 2000 Macau Grand Prix =

Formula Three motor race

Race details
Date	19 November 2000
Location	Guia Circuit, Macau
Course	Temporary street circuit 6.120 km (3.803 mi)
Distance	30 laps, 165.27 km (102.69 mi)
- Leg 1

Pole
Driver	(India) Narain Karthikeyan	Carlin
Time	2:12.887

Fastest Lap
Driver	(India) Narain Karthikeyan	Carlin
Time	2:14.718

Podium
First	(Germany) Pierre Kaffer	team hms
Second	(Macau) André Couto	Bertram Schafer Racing
Third	(France) Mathieu Zangarelli	Promatecme
- Leg 2
Driver	(Germany) Pierre Kaffer	team hms

Fastest Lap
Driver	(India) Narain Karthikeyan	Carlin
Time	2:13.253

Podium
First	(Macau) André Couto	Bertram Schafer Racing
Second	(Italy) Paolo Montin	Target Racing
Third	(Japan) Ryo Fukuda	Ryo Fukuda

The 2000 Macau Grand Prix (officially the 47th Macau Grand Prix) was a Formula Three (F3) car race held on the streets of Macau on 19 November 2000. In contrast to other races, such as the Masters of Formula 3, the 2000 Macau Grand Prix was not affiliated with any F3 championship and was open to entries from all F3 championships. The race was split into two 15-lap aggregate legs held in the morning and afternoon. This is the first time that the rankings from Leg 1 are only used for the starting grid for Leg 2, the overall ranking is determined by Leg 2 rankings only. However, the players must complete both legs to be eligible for overall ranking. The Macau Grand Prix was held for the 47th time in 2000, and the 18th time for F3 cars.

André Couto of Bertram Schafer Racing won the Grand Prix after starting sixth in the first leg. Couto passed first-leg winner Pierre Kaffer of team hms at the start of the second leg and withstood pressure from Paolo Montin of Target Racing to become the first Macanese driver to win the race under F3 rules. Montin finished second, while Ryō Fukuda finished third in his own car.

== Background and entry list ==
The Macau Grand Prix is a Formula Three (F3) race that has been described as the territory's most prestigious international sporting event and a steeping stone to higher-tier racing categories such as Formula One. The 2000 Macau Grand Prix was held for the 47th time in 2000, and the 18th time under F3 regulations. It was held on the 6.2 km (3.9 mi) temporary 22-turn Guia Circuit on 18 November 2000, after three days of practice and qualifying. This was the first Macau Grand Prix since Macau's sovereignty was transferred to China.

The Macau Grand Prix Committee invited 30 drivers from 16 different countries to compete. Japan had the most drivers, with seven; Macau, France, Italy, the United Kingdom, and Austria all had two or more drivers competing. 18 of them made their Macau debuts. The drivers' average age was 23.6 years. All used Dallara chassis (F399 or F300) and engines from four manufacturers (Mugen-Honda, Opel Spiess, Renault Sodemo, and Toyota TOM'S). Two of the four major F3 series had champions on the grid. The winner of the Japanese series, Sébastien Philippe, was joined in Macau by French champion Jonathan Cochet. British champion Antônio Pizzonia was absent due to a clashing Champ Car test with Mo Nunn Racing. He was replaced at Manor Motorsport by local driver Lei Kit Meng. Outside of F3, André Couto of International Formula 3000 and Alex Yoong of Formula Nippon received invitations to compete in Macau.

== Practice and qualifying ==
There were two half-hour practice sessions on Thursday morning and Friday morning that preceded the race on Sunday. Rain fell shortly before the first practice session started, intensifying as it progressed, but a dry racing line appeared before the session's conclusion. At one point, Narain Karthikeyan was more than seven seconds faster than any other driver in the session's opening minutes. His teammate Takuma Sato was fastest overall with a time of 2 minutes, 32.044 seconds. Tiago Monteiro was second when the dry line appeared near the end of the session. Seiji Ara, Karthikeyan, Patrick Friesacher, Toshihiro Kaneishi, Couto, Robert Lechner, Tomas Scheckter and Pierre Kaffer rounded out the session's top ten drivers. Karthikeyan came to a stop at the Melco hairpin for unknown reasons after Ben Collins' rear wing loosened due to a sheared retaining bolt.

Qualifying was split into two 45-minute sessions, one on Thursday afternoon and one on Friday afternoon. Each driver's fastest time from either session was used to determine their starting position in Sunday's race. The first qualifying session took place in cloudy conditions. Paolo Montin consistently ran in the top five and set the provisional fastest lap time of 2 minutes, 15.374 seconds with three minutes remaining. Karthikeyan was three-tenths of a second slower in provisional second; he suffered minor rear-end damage after hitting a barrier at Moorish Hill corner. Slower traffic kept Cochet in third place and cost him seven chances to complete a full-speed lap around the tight circuit. Sato finished fourth after an engine breakage prevented him from improving his lap time near the end of qualifying. Gianmaria Bruni finished sixth after crashing into a barrier near the end of the session at Lisboa corner. Couto, Kaffer, Ryō Fukuda, and Philippe completed the top ten. Because he was 2.002 seconds slower than Montin, Peter Sundberg was the fastest driver not to qualify in the provisional top ten. Mathieu Zangarelli followed ahead of Yoong and Scheckter. Collins was 15th. He was followed in three of the next four places by the Japanese trio of Ara, Haruki Kurosawa and Yuji Ide, who were separated by Enrico Toccacelo in 18th. The final ten provisional qualifiers were Miloš Pavlović, Andy Priaulx, Friesacher, Zsolt Baumgartner, Ying Kin Lee, Shinichi Takagi, Kaneishi, Lei, Michael Ho, Jo Merszei and Montiero. Monteiro did not set a lap because he crashed at the R Bend corner and stopped the session after five minutes. The R Bend also caught out Japanese drivers Kaneishi and Ara with the latter's accident prematurely ending the session with five minutes left because his car was on the racing line.

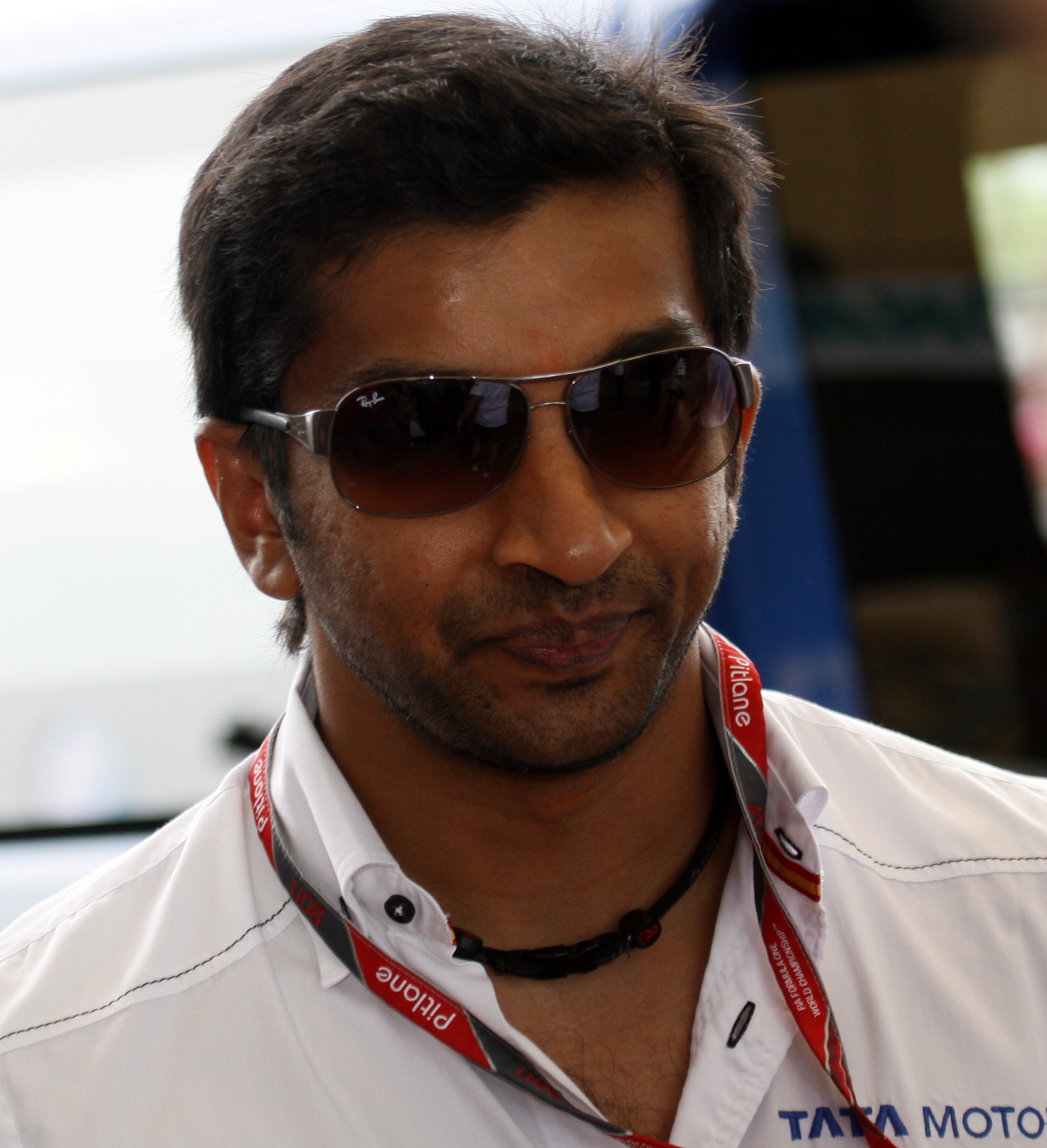
Narain Karthikeyan (pictured in 2011) had the pole position with a new lap record of the Guia Circuit.

Sato and his teammate Karthikeyan exchanged the fastest laps throughout the second half-hour practise session, held on a dirty track and in cloudy weather, but it was Sato who led when practice ended with a 2 minutes, 14.087 seconds lap, which he recorded in the session's final minutes after making overnight car setup changes. Despite minor contact with a trackside barrier, Karthikeyan was two-tenths of a second slower in second. Montin, the provisional pole sitter, ran smoothly and lapped third-fastest. Monteiro, Kaffer, and Cochet were ranked four through six. Couto duplicated his first practice and qualifying results in seventh. Fukuda, Yoong and Zangarelli completed the top ten. While the session passed without the need for a red flag stoppage, Lechner made light contact with a wall at the left-hand corner after the Melco hairpin and could not return to the pit lane. Scheckter hit a barrier at Moorish Hill turn.

Priaulx set the early pace in the second qualifying session, passing Montin to claim the provisional pole position. Karthikeyan surpassed Priaulx's effort to top the time sheets one-third of the way through, a position he held until Fukuda took over. Karthikeyan reclaimed first place 20 minutes into the session with a new Guia Circuit track record of 2 minutes, 12.887 seconds and held it to start the first leg from pole position. Sato, his teammate, joined him on the grid's front row and pushed hard to be nearly four-tenths of a second slower. Fukuda moved to third place after grazing the circuit's barriers three times while pushing hard to lap faster and tearing his racing gloves. Kaffer advanced seven positions to start the first leg in fourth, while Zangarelli advanced seven positions to fifth, narrowly ahead of sixth-placed Couto. Friesacher qualified seventh, up fifteen places from his first session result. Toccacelo in eighth was ahead of fellow Italian Montin, who dropped nine positions to ninth, and Bruni in tenth. Cochet dropped from third to eleventh place, while Monteiro gained the most positions of any driver, starting from twelfth. Priaulx, Scheckter, Sundberg, Collins, Yoong, Ara, Kurosawa, Phillipe, Takagi, Kaneshi, Lechner, Pavlovi, Ide, Baumgartner, Ying, Kit, Merszei, and Ho completed the grid.

=== Qualifying classification ===
A driver's fastest time from the two qualifying sessions is denoted in bold.

Final qualifying classification
Pos	No.	Driver	Team	Q1 Time	Rank	Q2 Time	Rank	Gap	Grid
1	21	(India) Narain Karthikeyan	Carlin	2:15.676	2	**2:12.887**	1	—	1
2	22	(Japan) Takuma Sato	Carlin	2:16.380	4	**2:13.146**	2	+0.259	2
3	3	(Japan) Ryo Fukuda	Ryo Fukuda	2:17.070	9	**2:13.262**	3	+0.375	3
4	17	(Germany) Pierre Kaffer	team hms	2:16.790	8	**2:13.428**	4	+0.541	4
5	5	(France) Mathieu Zangarelli	Promatecme	2:17.572	12	**2:13.655**	5	+0.768	5
6	10	(Macau) André Couto	Bertram Schafer Racing	2:16.755	7	**2:13.914**	6	+1.027	6
7	9	(Austria) Patrick Friesacher	Bertram Schafer Racing	2:19.808	22	**2:14.024**	7	+1.137	7
8	27	(Italy) Enrico Toccacelo	Prema Powerteam	2:18.577	18	**2:14.056**	8	+1.169	8
9	23	(Italy) Paolo Montin	Target Racing	2:15.374	1	**2:14.057**	9	+1.170	9
10	25	(Italy) Gianmaria Bruni	Fortec Motorsport	2:16.733	6	**2:14.276**	10	+1.389	10
11	6	(France) Jonathan Cochet	Promatecme	2:15.925	3	**2:14.379**	11	+1.492	11
12	20	(Portugal) Tiago Monteiro	ASM Formule 3	4:10.834	30	**2:14.475**	12	+1.588	12
13	8	(United Kingdom) Andy Priaulx	Lucozade Motorsport Team	2:19.436	21	**2:14.487**	13	+1.600	13
14	12	(South Africa) Tomas Scheckter	Swiss Racing Team	2:17.616	14	**2:14.505**	14	+1.618	14
15	28	(Sweden) Peter Sundberg	Prema Powerteam	2:17.480	11	**2:14.566**	15	+1.679	15
16	29	(United Kingdom) Ben Collins	RC Motorsport	2:17.915	15	**2:14.731**	16	+1.844	16
17	11	(Malaysia) Alex Yoong	Swiss Racing Team	2:17.580	13	**2:14.816**	17	+1.929	17
18	16	(Japan) Seiji Ara	Toda Racing	2:18.004	16	**2:14.839**	18	+1.952	18
19	2	(Japan) Haruki Kurosawa	TOM'S	2:18.012	17	**2:14.846**	19	+1.959	19
20	19	(France) Sébastien Philippe	Promatecme	2:17.376	10	**2:15.172**	20	+2.285	20
21	38	(Japan) Shinichi Takagi	Inging	2:20.011	25	**2:15.212**	21	+2.325	21
22	32	(Japan) Toshihiro Kaneishi	GM Motorsport	2:20.224	26	**2:15.668**	22	+2.781	22
23	1	(Austria) Robert Lechner	TOM'S	2:16.616	5	**2:15.982**	23	+3.095	23
24	30	(Serbia and Montenegro) Miloš Pavlović	RC Motorsport	2:19.378	20	**2:16.041**	24	+3.154	24
25	15	(Japan) Yuji Ide	Skill Speed	2:18.941	19	**2:16.098**	25	+3.211	25
26	31	(Hungary) Zsolt Baumgartner	GM Motorsport	2:19.812	23	**2:16.688**	26	+3.801	26
27	26	(China) Ying Kin Lee	Fortec Motorsport	**2:19.934**	24	—	—	+7.047	24
28	7	(Macau) Lei Kit Meng	Lucozade Motorsport Team	2:23.053	27	**2:22.318**	27	+9.431	28
29	18	(Macau) Jo Merszei	team hms	2:24.515	29	**2:23.836**	28	+10.949	29
30	36	(Macau) Michael Ho	GM Motorsport	**2:23.891**	28	—	—	+11.004	30
110% qualifying time: 2:26.175
**Bold time** indicates the faster of the two times that determined the grid order.

== Warm-up ==
A half an hour warm-up session was held on the morning of the race. A brief rain shower earlier in the morning made the track wet, but it quickly dried. Despite spinning, Kaffer reported no car problems and lapped quickest at 2 minutes, 18.293 seconds, almost three seconds faster than Friesacher in second place. Kaneishi finished third with a lap set late in warm-up, with Sato fourth. Collins, fifth, improved his top speed after modifying his car's setup and cutting his diffuser. Positions five to ten were filled by Scheckter, Priaulx, Monteiro, Lee, and Couto.

== Race ==
The race on Sunday was divided into two aggregate legs totaling 30 laps. The results of the morning's first 15-lap leg determined the starting grid for the second leg, with the winner starting from pole position. Following that, a five-hour interval was held to allow for the intervening support races. Later in the afternoon, the second 15-lap leg began. The driver who completed all 30 laps in the shortest amount of time won the Grand Prix overall.

=== Leg 1 ===
The first leg began in cloudy and dry weather at 10:15 Macau Standard Time (UTC+08:00) on 19 November. Karthikeyan made a quick getaway from his grid position to maintain his lead into the Reservoir Bend corner, but he lost it to teammate Sato on the straight heading towards Lisboa turn. However, Sato missed the braking point for the corner and crashed into a tyre barrier, forcing him to retire. This returned the lead to his teammate Karthikeyan, who established a small but comfortable lead over the rest of the field. Ho retired after an accident leaving Mandarin Oriental Bend on the same lap. Positions changed behind him as Couto passed Fukuda for third on lap two, and he overtook Kaffer for second on the following lap. Karthikeyan had a five-second lead over Couto by the end of the fifth lap. On the following lap, however, Karthikeyan lost control of his vehicle at Paiol corner and collided with the wall, becoming the race's third retirement. The safety car was deployed for two laps to allow his car to be removed from the track. Meanwhile, Cochet drove over debris from Karthikeyan's car, costing him an opportunity to win the race.

At the lap nine restart, Kaffer began battling Couto for the lead. On the next lap, he went to the outside line to try to pass Couto into Lisboa corner, but Couto maintained the lead on the inside line. Bruni retired on that lap after colliding with the wall at the Lisboa turn. On the 12th lap, Kaffer passed Couto entering Lisboa turn, but he braked too late and ran wide into the turn. He came close to hitting the wall as Couto retook the lead. Friesacher collided with a wall at R Bend on lap 12, but he continued without major damage. Couto braked too late for the Lisboa turn on lap 14, and Kaffer took the lead. He led the rest of the leg to win by 3.4 seconds over Couto and began the second leg from pole position. Zangarelli and Montin were third and fourth and Fukuda took fifth. Friesacher was sixth, Scheckter finished seventh after being delayed by a slower driver, Toccacelo took eighth, Priaulx ninth and Monteiro tenth. Kurosawa finished eleventh, up eight places from his starting position of 19th. Collins, Sundberg, Yoong, the Japanese duo of Ara and Kaneishi, Lechner, Takagi, Lee, Cochet, Pavlovi, Baumgartner, Lei, and Merszei were the final finishers.

=== Leg 2 ===
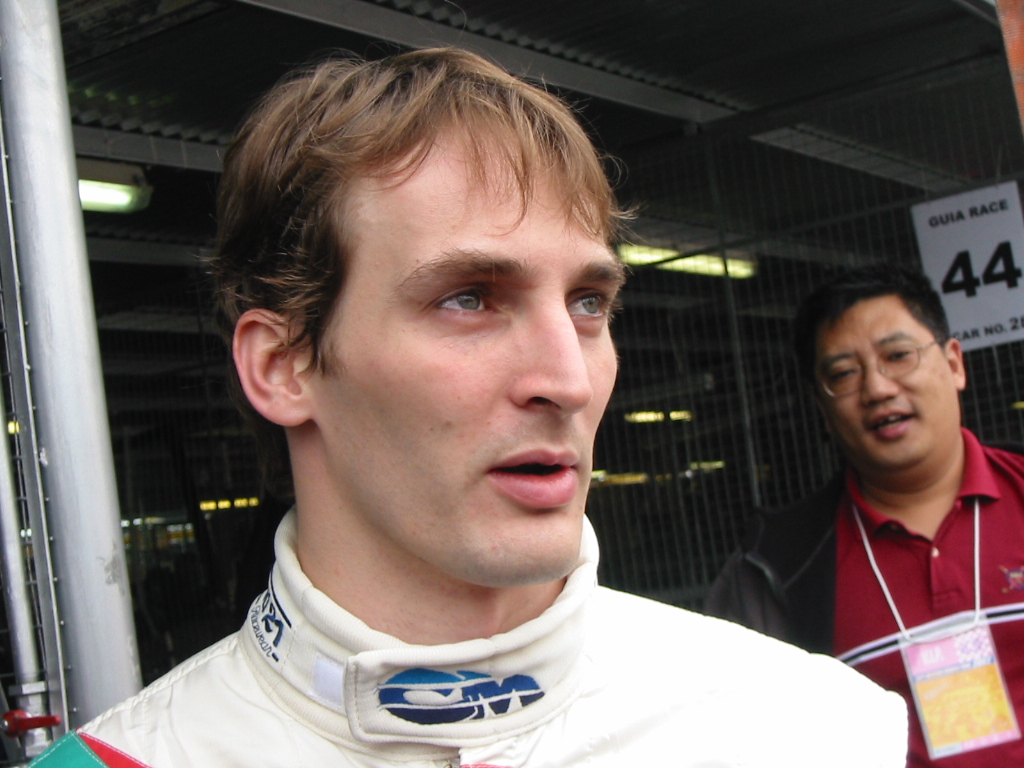
André Couto (pictured in 2002) became the first Macanese to win the Macau Grand Prix under Formula Three regulations.

The second leg commenced later that day at 15:35 local time under cloudy and dry weather. Couto outran pole sitter Kaffer off the line and passed him entering Lisboa corner. Kaffer pressed Couto until Montin began to challenge him for second. Montin entered Kaffer's slipstream as the two drove towards the Lisboa turn on the fifth lap, and then turned right to make a pass under braking. Couto's lead was reduced after that, as Montin closed in on him and was close behind him at the start of the seventh lap. On laps seven and eight, Montin unsuccessfully attempted to pass Couto under braking at Lisboa corner. Kaffer was passed by the faster Fukuda for third position on the eighth lap. Montin was unable to overtake Couto because the safety car was deployed on lap thirteen after Lechner crashed into a wall beside the circuit at the R Bend, and no overtaking was permitted under these conditions.

The second leg was run behind the safety car for the final two laps in a single line, giving Couto the victory, making him the first Macanese to win the Macau Grand Prix since it adopted F3 regulations in 1983. Montin finished second, with Fukuda rounding out the podium in third place. Kaffer finished fourth, and Tocacello finished fifth, having advanced three positions from his first leg result. An engine cut out at the Melco hairpin and the main straight left Scheckter in sixth. Collins finished seventh, and Priaulx, the second British driver in Macau, finished eighth overall. Monteiro and Friesacher finished in the top ten. Cochet, Sundberg, Lee, Baumgartner, Takagi, Lei, Ara, Merszei, Zangarelli, and Kaneishi were the final classified finishers outside the top ten.

=== Race classification ===
Final race classification
Pos	No.	Driver	Team	Laps	Grid
1	10	(Macau) André Couto	Bertram Schafer Racing	30	6
2	23	(Italy) Paolo Montin	Target Racing	30	9
3	3	(Japan) Ryō Fukuda	Ryo Fukuda	30	3
4	17	(Germany) Pierre Kaffer	team hms	30	4
5	27	(Italy) Enrico Toccacelo	Prema Powerteam	30	8
6	12	(South Africa) Tomas Scheckter	Swiss Racing Team	30	14
7	29	(United Kingdom) Ben Collins	RC Motorsport	30	16
8	8	(United Kingdom) Andy Priaulx	Lucozade Motorsport Team	30	13
9	20	(Portugal) Tiago Monteiro	ASM Formule 3	30	12
10	9	(Austria) Patrick Friesacher	Bertram Schafer Racing	30	7
11	6	(France) Jonathan Cochet	Promatecme	30	11
12	28	(Sweden) Peter Sundberg	Prema Powerteam	30	15
13	26	(China) Ying Kin Lee	Fortec Motorsport	30	27
14	31	(Hungary) Zsolt Baumgartner	GM Motorsport	30	26
15	38	(Japan) Shinichi Takagi	Inging	30	21
16	7	(Macau) Lei Kit Meng	Lucozade Motorsport Team	29	28
17	16	(Japan) Seiji Ara	Toda Racing	29	18
18	18	(Macau) Jo Merszei	team hms	29	29
19	5	(France) Mathieu Zangarelli	Promatecme	29	5
20	32	(Japan) Toshihiro Kaneishi	GM Motorsport	29	22
NC	15	(Japan) Yuji Ide	Skill Speed	23	25
NC	19	(France) Sébastien Philippe	Promatecme	19	20
NC	21	(India) Narain Karthikeyan	Carlin	15	1
NC	22	(Japan) Takuma Sato	Carlin	15	2
NC	1	(Austria) Robert Lechner	TOM'S	11	23
NC	2	(Japan) Haruki Kurosawa	TOM'S	8	19
NC	25	(Italy) Gianmaria Bruni	Fortec Motorsport	7	10
NC	11	(Malaysia) Alex Yoong	Swiss Racing Team	6	17
NC	30	(Serbia and Montenegro) Miloš Pavlović	RC Motorsport	5	24
NC	36	(Macau) Michael Ho	GM Motorsport	0	30
Fastest lap: Narain Karthikeyan, 2:13.253 165.34 km/h (102.74 mph) on lap 11 (leg 2)
