= 1999 Macau Grand Prix =

Formula Three motor race

Race details
Date	21 November 1999
Location	Guia Circuit, Macau
Course	Temporary street circuit 6.120 km (3.803 mi)
Distance	Qualifying Race; 15 laps, 73.44 km (45.63 mi); Main Race; 30 laps, 165.27 km (102.69 mi)
- Leg 1

Pole
Driver	(United Kingdom) Darren Manning	TOM'S
Time	2:14.143

Fastest Lap
Driver	(United Kingdom) Darren Manning	TOM'S
Time	2:14.983

Podium
First	(United Kingdom) Darren Manning	TOM'S
Second	(Portugal) Andre Couto	Bertram Schafer Racing
Third	(United Kingdom) Jenson Button	Promatecme
- Leg 2
Driver	(United Kingdom) Darren Manning	TOM'S

Fastest Lap
Driver	(United Kingdom) Darren Manning	TOM'S
Time	2:14.264

Podium
First	(United Kingdom) Darren Manning	TOM'S
Second	(United Kingdom) Jenson Button	Promatecme
Third	(Japan) Daisuke Ito	Skill Speed

The 1999 Macau Grand Prix Formula Three was the 46th Macau Grand Prix race to be held on the streets of Macau on 21 November 1999. It was the sixteenth edition for Formula Three cars. This was the last Macau Grand Prix held in Portuguese administrated Macau before Macau's sovereignty handed over to the People's Republic of China the following month.

== Qualifying ==
Pos	No	Driver	Team	Q1 Time	Rank	Q2 Time	Rank	Gap	Grid
1	1	(United Kingdom) Darren Manning	TOM'S	2:14.143	1	2:14.194	1		1
2	20	(United Kingdom) Jenson Button	Promatecme	2:16.313	7	2:14.664	2	+ 0.521	2
3	28	(Austria) Robert Lechner	GM DSF F3 Team	2:16.247	5	2:14.925	3	+ 0.782	3
4	5	(Sweden) Peter Sundberg	Prema Powerteam	2:17.444	13	2:15.061	4	+ 0.918	4
5	14	(Portugal) André Couto	Bertram Schäfer Racing	2:15.418	2	2:15.153	5	+ 1.010	5
6	9	(India) Narain Karthikeyan	Paul Stewart Racing	2:16.370	9	2:15.327	6	+ 1.184	6
7	8	(France) Sébastien Bourdais	La Filiere	2:16.113	4	2:15.351	7	+ 1.208	7
8	21	(Japan) Daisuke Itō	Skill Speed	2:16.248	6	2:15.367	8	+ 1.224	8
9	17	(France) Benoît Tréluyer	Signature	2:16.344	8	2:15.379	9	+ 1.236	9
10	18	(France) Jonathan Cochet	Signature	2:16.509	10	2:15.449	10	+ 1.306	10
11	16	(Netherlands) Christijan Albers	Bertram Schäfer Racing	2:15.781	3	2:15.875	12	+ 1.638	11
12	23	(Italy) Paolo Montin	Carlin Motorsport	2:16.541	11	2:15.801	11	+ 1.658	12
13	10	(Brazil) Luciano Burti	Paul Stewart Racing	2:16.993	12	2:15.886	13	+ 1.743	13
14	12	(Switzerland) Gabriele Varano	RC Motorsport	2:18.922	18	2:16.183	14	+ 2.040	14
15	19	(France) Bruno Besson	Promatecme	2:17.976	17	2:16.187	15	+ 2.044	15
16	3	(United Kingdom) Marc Hynes	Manor Motorsport	2:18.993	20	2:16.824	16	+ 2.681	16
17	2	(Japan) Seiji Ara	TOM'S	2:17.489	15	2:16.890	17	+ 2.747	17
18	30	(Portugal) Tiago Monteiro	ASM Formel 3	2:17.472	14	2:16.914	18	+ 2.771	18
19	34	(Belgium) Yves Olivier	JB Motorsport	2:19.526	23	2:16.942	19	+ 2.799	19
20	38	(South Africa) Toby Scheckter	Speedsport F3 Racing Team	2:20.696	25	2:17.382	20	+ 3.239	20
21	31	(France) Sébastien Dumez	ASM Formel 3	2:18.943	19	2:17.389	21	+ 3.246	21
22	7	(Japan) Ryō Fukuda	La Filiere	2:17.676	16	2:18.145	23	+ 3.533	22
23	36	(Malaysia) Alex Yoong	Alan Docking Racing	2:19.102	21	2:17.679	22	+ 3.536	23
24	33	(Netherlands) Walter van Lent	JB Motorsport	2:21.510	26	2:18.222	24	+ 4.079	24
25	37	(United Kingdom) Andrew Kirkaldy	Alan Docking Racing	2:19.636	24	2:19.389	25	+ 5.246	25
26	11	(Italy) Michele Spoldi	RC Motorsport	2:19.406	22	2:17.550	22*	+ 5.263	26
27	22	(Portugal) Jo Merszei	Carlin Motorsport	2:25.997	29	2:21.187	26	+ 7.044	27
28	6	(Argentina) Juan Manuel López	Prema Powerteam	2:22.878	27	no time	-	+ 8.735	28
29	29	(Portugal) Michael Ho	GM DSF F3 Team	2:24.246	28	no time	-	+ 10.103	29
30	64	(Japan) Tsugio Matsuda	Nakajima Honda	2:16.674	12*	2:25.155	27	+ 11.012	30

- Spoldi and Matsuda had their respective times disallowed.

== Overall Race Results (Top 20) ==
Pos	No.	Driver	Team	Chassis	Engine
1	1	(United Kingdom) Darren Manning	(Japan) TOM'S	Dallara 399	Toyota
2	20	(United Kingdom) Jenson Button	(France) Promatecme	Dallara 399	Renault
3	21	(Japan) Daisuke Ito	(Japan) Skill Speed	Dallara 399	Mugen-Honda
4	64	(Japan) Tsugio Matsuda	(Japan) Nakajima Honda	Dallara 399	Mugen-Honda
5	34	(Belgium) Yves Olivier	(Belgium) JB Motorsport	Dallara 399	Opel
6	11	(Italy) Michele Spoldi	(Italy) RC Motorsport	Dallara 399	Opel
7	36	(Malaysia) Alex Yoong	(United Kingdom) Alan Docking Racing	Dallara 399	Mugen-Honda
8	7	(Japan) Ryo Fukuda	(France) La Filiere	Martini MK79	Opel
9	38	(South Africa) Toby Scheckter	(United Kingdom) Speedsport F3 Racing Team	Dallara 399	Mugen-Honda
10	29	(Portugal) Michael Ho	(Germany) GM DSF F3 Team	Dallara 399	Opel
11	37	(United Kingdom) Andrew Kirkaldy	(United Kingdom) Alan Docking Racing	Dallara 399	Mugen-Honda
12	22	(Portugal) Jo Merszei	(United Kingdom) Carlin	Dallara 399	Mugen-Honda
13	5	(Sweden) Peter Sundberg	(Italy) Prema Powerteam	Dallara 399	Opel
14	9	(India) Narain Karthikeyan	(United Kingdom) Paul Stewart Racing	Dallara 399	Mugen-Honda
15	30	(Portugal) Tiago Monteiro	(France) ASM Formel 3	Dallara 399	Renault
16	2	(Japan) Seiji Ara	(Japan) TOM'S	Dallara 399	Toyota
17	3	(United Kingdom) Marc Hynes	(United Kingdom) Manor Motorsport	Dallara F399	Mugen-Honda
18	14	(Portugal) Andre Couto	(Germany) Bertram Schafer Racing	Dallara 399	Opel
19	10	(Brazil) Luciano Burti	(United Kingdom) Paul Stewart Racing	Dallara 399	Mugen-Honda
20	18	(France) Jonathan Cochet	(France) Signature	Dallara 399	Renault
