= Michael Ho (racing driver) =

Macanese racing driver

- Nationality: Macanese
- Born: 29 November 1968 (age 57) Macau

TCR International Series career
- Debut season: 2016
- Current team: Champ Motorsport
- Car number: 38
- Starts: 0

Previous series
- 2016 2015 2013 2012 2011 2010 2010 2006, 08-09 2005 1999, 01 1998 1998 1997, 99-10: TCR Asia Series; Chinese Racing Cup; Macau Lotus Greater China Race; Asian Formula Renault Challenge; Racecar Euro Series; European F3 Open; China Touring Car Championship; Formula V6 Asia; Australian Formula 3 Asian Formula Renault 2000 Challenge; ELF Formula Campus International; China Formula Campus Challenge; Macau Grand Prix

Championship titles
- 2001 2010 2015: Asian Formula Renault 2000 Challenge; China Touring Car Championship; Chinese Racing Cup

Ho Hon "Michael" Keong (born 29 November 1968) is a Macanese racing driver currently competing in the TCR International Series and TCR Asia Series. Having previously competed in the European F3 Open, Formula V6 Asia and Macau Grand Prix amongst others.

== Racing career ==
Ho began his career in 1999 in the Macau Grand Prix, he continued to race at the Macau Grand Prix up until 2010. He also took part in the China Formula Campus Challenge and ELF Formula Campus International series' in 1998. In 1999, he raced in the Asian Formula Renault 2000 Challenge, he also raced there in 2001. In 2005, he had a single start in the Australian Formula 3. For 2006, he raced in the Formula V6 Asia, he finished eighth in the standings. After not racing there in 2007, he returned there 2008 and stayed there for 2009, he finished ninth in 2008 standings and fifth in 2009. In 2010, he switched to the European F3 Open Championship, he only raced a partial season, finishing 19th in the standings. For 2011, he raced in the Racecar Euro Series, before switching to the Asian Formula Renault Challenge for 2012. In 2013, he took part in the Macau Lotus Greater China Race. He switched to the Chinese Racing Cup for 2015 finishing fifth in the championship standings that year. He switched to the TCR Asia Series for 2016, joining the series with Champ Motorsport.

In November 2016, it was announced that Ho would race in the TCR International Series, driving a Honda Civic TCR for Champ Motorsport.

== Racing record ==
=== Complete Macau Grand Prix results ===
Year	Team	Car	Qualifying	Quali race	Main race
1999	GM DSF F3 Team	Dallara F399	29th	?	10th
2000	GM Motorsport	Dallara F399	30th	?	DNF
2001	Cram Competition	Dallara F300	27th	?	9th
2002	Kolles Racing	Dallara F302	27th	?	9th
2003	TME Racing	Dallara F302	26th	?	7th
2004	TME Racing	Dallara F304	29th	23rd	DNF
2005	Team Midland Euroseries	Dallara F304	27th	25th	15th
2006	Ombra Racing	Dallara F305	29th	23rd	20th
2007	Hitech Racing	Dallara F305	25th	DNF	24th
2008	Räikkönen Robertson Racing	Dallara F308	25th	DNF	20th
2009	Champ Motorsport/Manor Motorsport	Dallara F308	29th	26th	DNF
2010	Räikkönen Robertson Racing	Dallara F308	29th	24th	DNF

=== Complete TCR International Series results ===
(key) (Races in bold indicate pole position) (Races in italics indicate fastest lap)

Year	Team	Car	1	2	3	4	5	6	7	8	9	10	11	12	13	14	15	16	17	18	19	20	21	22	DC	Points
2016	Champ Motorsport	Honda Civic TCR	BHR; 1	BHR; 2	POR; 1	POR; 2	BEL; 1	BEL; 2	ITA; 1	ITA; 2	AUT; 1	AUT; 2	GER; 1	GER; 2	RUS; 1	RUS; 2	THA; 1	THA; 2	SIN; 1	SIN; 2	MYS; 1	MYS; 2	MAC; 1 WD	MAC; 2 WD	NC	0

^{†} Driver did not finish the race, but was classified as he completed over 90% of the race distance.
^{*} Season still in progress.
