= Lei Kit Meng =

Macau racing driver

Lei Kit Meng (Chinese: 李潔明, born December 30, 1967, in Macau) is an auto racing driver from Macau.

== Career ==
Lei Kit Meng competed in two races of the 1998 British Formula Three Championship for Carlin Motorsport. Between 2000 and 2007 he competed each year in the Formula Three races at the Macau Grand Prix, with a best finish of tenth place in 2001, when he raced for Fortec Motorsport. In 2006, he competed in the Asian Formula Three Championship.

He also owns the RPM Racing Team, which competes in touring car racing in Asia. In 2008 the team attempted to enter two cars for the World Touring Car Championship end-of-season round, the Race of Macau, with Lei Kit Meng driving a Toyota Altezza and Jo Merszei driving a Honda Civic Type-R. However, the team were not allowed to compete after the scrutineers found their cars did not comply with FIA safety requirements.

RPM Racing Team teamed up with the China Dragon Racing team for the 2009 Race of Macau, with Meng driving a BMW 320si.

On 18 November 2019, Lei Kit Meng, driving a Nissan GTR-34 in the Macau Touring Car Cup, hit the barrier at Mandarin bend. Lei did not stop on the first possible opportunity to make it easy for the race to restart. Instead, he drove along the circuit for over one lap until the race direction showed him the black flag to disqualify him and order his immediate return to the pits. The incident caused over 15 minutes of stoppage, since Lei’s car spilled oil and other fluids on the track surface that had to be cleaned by the track staff. In the end, the race was ended only after seven laps, of which five were completed behind the safety car.
