= Tyre wall =

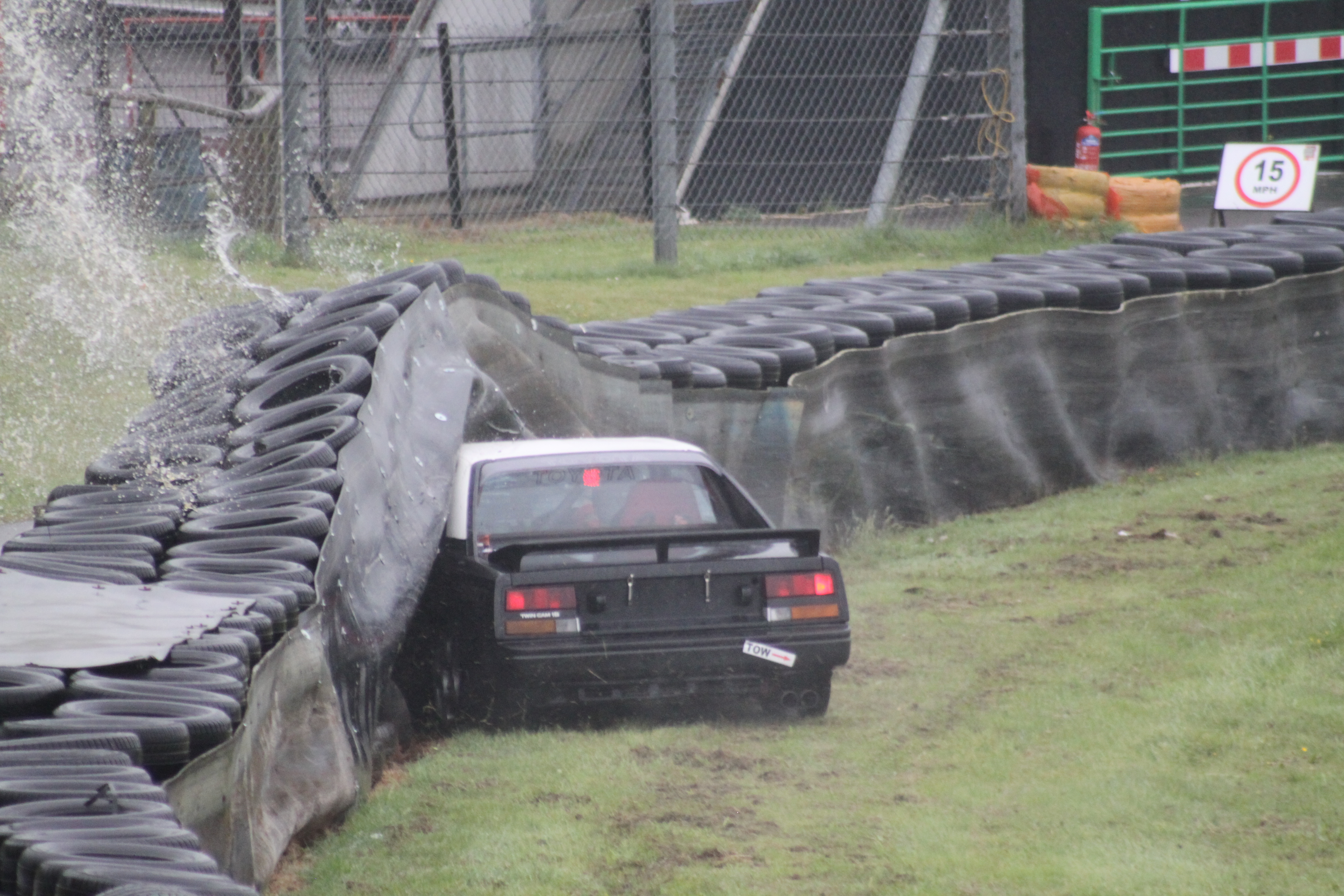
A tyre wall stops a crashing Toyota MR2

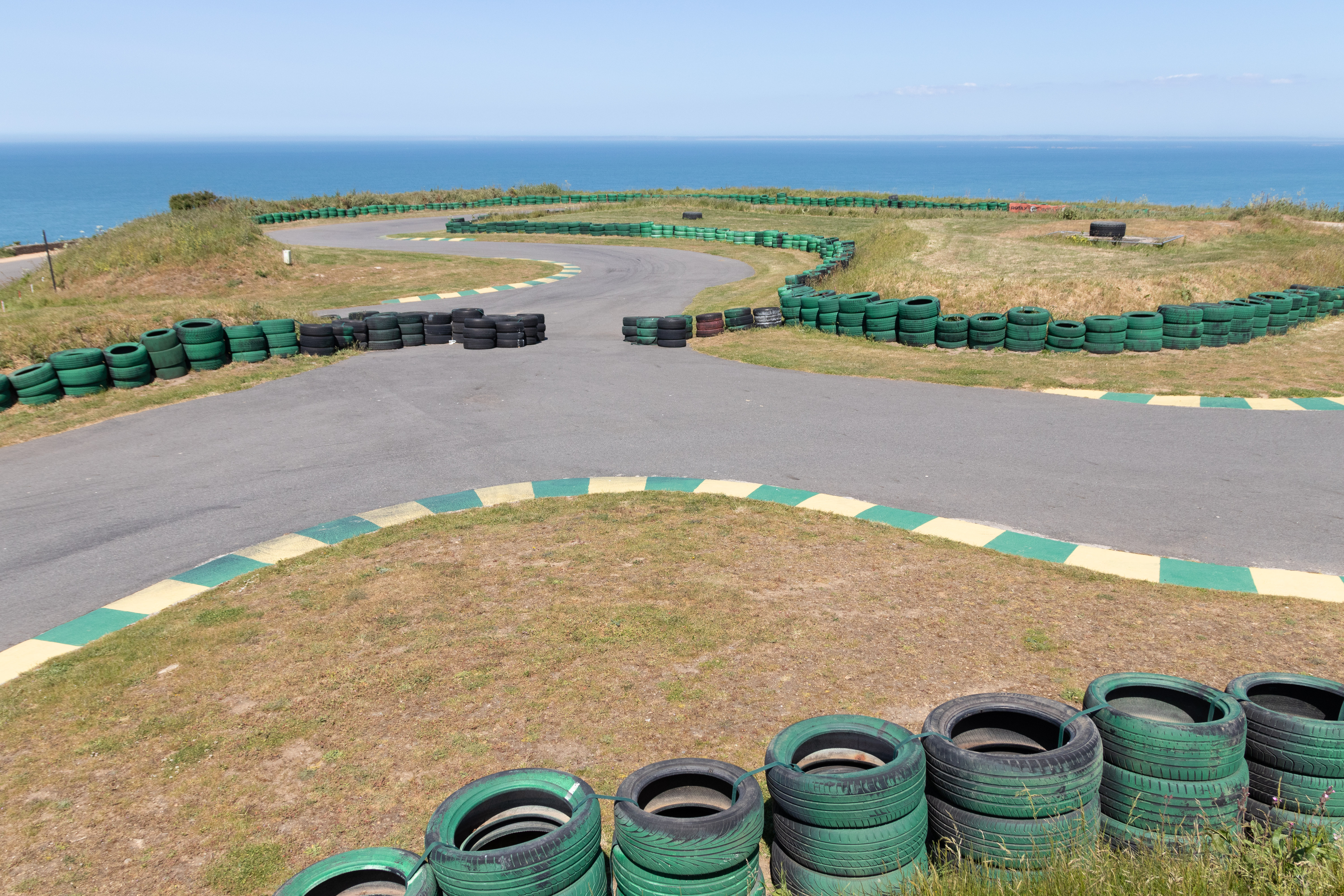
Small versions are often found at karting circuits

A tyre wall (US tire wall or tire barrier), is a type of traffic barrier commonly used at racing circuits to prevent racing vehicles from leaving or crossing into another part of the track. Tyres are a consumable item generated in some volume by racing activities, and in sufficient quantities can successfully absorb some of the energy of a crashing vehicle. A tyre wall will typically have some form of fixed backing (such as a concrete wall) to prevent vehicles from pushing through it, and will normally have the tyres tied together both for effectiveness and to prevent stray tyres from being thrown into the track during a collision and causing a hazard to other vehicles on the track.
