= Jo Merszei =

Macau racing driver

- Nationality: Macanese
- Full name: Joseph Rosa Merszei
- Born: 6 April 1974 (age 52) Hong Kong

Previous series
- 2009-2013 1999-2007: WTCC; Macau F3 Grand Prix

Joseph Rosa Merszei (born 6 April 1974 in Hong Kong) is an auto racing driver from Macau.

== Career history ==
=== Early years ===
Merszei competed in touring car racing in Asia-Pacific and Hong Kong championships between 1991 and 1996. He has since competed in many open wheel racing series in Asia and competed in the Formula Three Macau Grand Prix every year between 1999 and 2007, with a best finish of 12th in 2001.

=== World Touring Car Championship ===
Merszei made his World Touring Car Championship debut for Liqui Moly Team Engstler at the 2009 Guia Race of Macau He again drove for the team in 2010 and 2011 Macau races. He returned to the team for the 2012 Guia Race of Macau, racing the car previously driven by Alex Liu.

== Racing record ==
=== Complete World Touring Car Championship results ===
(key) (Races in bold indicate pole position) (Races in italics indicate fastest lap)

Year	Team	Car	1	2	3	4	5	6	7	8	9	10	11	12	13	14	15	16	17	18	19	20	21	22	23	24	DC	Points
2009	Liqui Moly Team Engstler	BMW 320si	BRA; 1	BRA; 2	MEX; 1	MEX; 2	MAR; 1	MAR; 2	FRA; 1	FRA; 2	ESP; 1	ESP; 2	CZE; 1	CZE; 2	POR; 1	POR; 2	GBR; 1	GBR; 2	GER; 1	GER; 2	ITA; 1	ITA; 2	JPN; 1	JPN; 2	MAC; 1; 22	MAC; 2; 20	NC	0
2010	Liqui Moly Team Engstler	BMW 320si	BRA; 1	BRA; 2	MAR; 1	MAR; 2	ITA; 1	ITA; 2	BEL; 1	BEL; 2	POR; 1	POR; 2	GBR; 1	GBR; 2	CZE; 1	CZE; 2	GER; 1	GER; 2	ESP; 1	ESP; 2	JPN; 1	JPN; 2	MAC; 1; 19	MAC; 2 Ret			NC	0
2011	Liqui Moly Team Engstler	BMW 320si	BRA; 1	BRA; 2	BEL; 1	BEL; 2	ITA; 1	ITA; 2	HUN; 1	HUN; 2	CZE; 1	CZE; 2	POR; 1	POR; 2	GBR; 1	GBR; 2	GER; 1	GER; 2	ESP; 1	ESP; 2	JPN; 1	JPN; 2	CHN; 1	CHN; 2	MAC; 1; 14	MAC; 2; 15	NC	0
2012	Liqui Moly Team Engstler	BMW 320si	ITA; 1	ITA; 2	ESP; 1	ESP; 2	MAR; 1	MAR; 2	SVK; 1	SVK; 2	HUN; 1	HUN; 2	AUT; 1	AUT; 2	POR; 1	POR; 2	BRA; 1	BRA; 2	USA; 1	USA; 2	JPN; 1	JPN; 2	CHN; 1	CHN; 2	MAC; 1; 17	MAC; 2; 13	NC	0
2013	Liqui Moly Team Engstler	BMW 320si	ITA; 1	ITA; 2	MAR; 1	MAR; 2	SVK; 1	SVK; 2	HUN; 1	HUN; 2	AUT; 1	AUT; 2	RUS; 1	RUS; 2	POR; 1	POR; 2	ARG; 1	ARG; 2	USA; 1	USA; 2	JPN; 1	JPN; 2	CHN; 1	CHN; 2	MAC; 1; 21	MAC; 2 Ret	NC	0
