= 2004 Bahrain Superprix =

Race details
Date	10 December 2004
Official name	Bahrain Super Prix
Location	Sakhir, Bahrain
Course	Permanent racing facility 5.407 km (3.360 mi)
Distance	Qualification Race; 8 laps, 43.256 km (26.878 mi); Main Race; 20 laps, 108.140 km (67.195 mi)
- Pre-Final Race

Pole
Driver	(France) Franck Perera	ASM Formule 3

Podium
First	(United Kingdom) Jamie Green	ASM Formule 3
Second	(Brazil) Fabio Carbone	ThreeBond Racing
Third	(Germany) Nico Rosberg	Team Rosberg
- Main Race

Pole
Driver	(United Kingdom) Jamie Green	ASM Formule 3

Podium
First	(United Kingdom) Lewis Hamilton	Manor Motorsport
Second	(Germany) Nico Rosberg	Team Rosberg
Third	(United Kingdom) Jamie Green	ASM Formule 3

The 2004 Bahrain Superprix was the inaugural and only Bahrain Super Prix race held at the Bahrain International Circuit on December 10, 2004. It was won by Briton Lewis Hamilton for Manor Motorsport, who finished ahead of Nico Rosberg and Jamie Green.

== Drivers and teams ==
2004 Entry List
Team	No	Driver	Chassis	Engine	Main series
(France) Signature Team	1	(Netherlands) Giedo van der Garde	Dallara F304	Opel-Spiess	Formula 3 Euro Series
(France) Signature Team	2	(France) Loic Duval	Dallara F304	Opel-Spiess	Formula 3 Euro Series
(France) Signature Team	3	(United Kingdom) James Rossiter	Dallara F304	Opel-Spiess	British Formula Three
(Japan) Inging	4	(Italy) Ronnie Quintarelli	Dallara F304	Toyota-TOM'S	All-Japan Formula Three
(Japan) Inging	5	(Japan) Naoki Yokomizo	Dallara F304	Toyota-TOM'S	All-Japan Formula Three
(Germany) Team Rosberg	6	(Germany) Nico Rosberg	Dallara F304	Opel-Spiess	Formula 3 Euro Series
(Italy) Piquet Sports	7	(Brazil) Nelson Piquet Jr.	Dallara F304	Mugen-Honda	British Formula Three
(France) ASM Formule 3	8	(United Kingdom) Jamie Green	Dallara F304	Mercedes-HWA	Formula 3 Euro Series
(France) ASM Formule 3	9	(France) Alexandre Prémat	Dallara F304	Mercedes-HWA	Formula 3 Euro Series
(France) ASM Formule 3	10	(France) Eric Salignon	Dallara F304	Mercedes-HWA	Formula 3 Euro Series
(Switzerland) Menu Motorsport	11	(Venezuela) Ernesto Viso	Dallara F304	Opel-Spiess	British Formula Three
(Switzerland) Menu Motorsport	12	(United Kingdom) Rob Austin	Dallara F304	Opel-Spiess	British Formula Three
(Italy) Prema Powerteam	14	(France) Franck Perera	Dallara F304	Opel-Spiess	Formula 3 Euro Series
(Italy) Prema Powerteam	15	(Japan) Kohei Hirate	Dallara F304	Opel-Spiess	Formula 3 Euro Series
(Italy) Ombra Racing	16	(Italy) Matteo Cressoni	Dallara F304	Mugen-Honda	Italian Formula Three Series
(Italy) Ombra Racing	17	(Italy) Davide Mazzoleni	Dallara F304	Mugen-Honda	Italian Formula Three Series
(United Kingdom) Carlin Motorsport	18	(Brazil) Danilo Dirani	Dallara F304	Mugen-Honda	British Formula Three
(United Kingdom) Carlin Motorsport	19	(Estonia) Marko Asmer	Dallara F304	Mugen-Honda	British Formula Three
(United Kingdom) Carlin Motorsport	20	(Macau) Rodolfo Avila	Dallara F304	Mugen-Honda	None
(United Kingdom) Manor Motorsport	21	(United Kingdom) Lewis Hamilton	Dallara F304	Mercedes-HWA	British Formula Three
(United Kingdom) Manor Motorsport	22	(United Kingdom) Paul di Resta	Dallara F304	Mercedes-HWA	British Formula Three
(Japan) TOM'S	23	(United States) Richard Antinucci	Dallara F304	Toyota-TOM'S	All-Japan Formula Three
(Japan) TOM'S	24	(Japan) Kazuki Nakajima	Dallara F304	Toyota-TOM'S	All-Japan Formula Three
(United Kingdom) Hitech Racing	25	(Australia) Barton Mawer	Dallara F304	Renault-Sodemo	British Formula Three
(United Kingdom) Hitech Racing	26	(Brazil) Lucas di Grassi	Dallara F304	Renault-Sodemo	British Formula Three
(United Kingdom) Hitech Racing	27	(China) Ho-Pin Tung	Dallara F304	Renault-Sodemo	German Formula Three
(Luxembourg) TME-Racing	28	(Republic of Ireland) John O'Hara	Dallara F304	Toyota-TOM'S	None
(Luxembourg) TME-Racing	29	(Netherlands) Ross Zwolsman	Dallara F304	Toyota-TOM'S	Formula 3 Euro Series
(Japan) ThreeBond Racing	30	(Brazil) Fabio Carbone	Dallara F304	Nissan-Tomei	All-Japan Formula Three
(Switzerland) Swiss Racing Team	31	(Australia) Karl Reindler	Dallara F304	Opel-Spiess	Australian Formula 3 Championship
(Switzerland) Swiss Racing Team	32	(Japan) Daisuke Ikeda	Dallara F304	Opel-Spiess	All Japan Formula Three

== Classification ==
=== Qualifying ===
Qualifying was split into two sessions, both of 45 minutes, with the best times of each driver counting towards the grid for the qualifying race.

Pos	No	Driver	Team	Q1 Time	Rank	Q2 Time	Rank	Gap	Grid
1	14	(France) Franck Perera	Prema Powerteam	2:05.012	13	1:53.938	1		1
2	8	(United Kingdom) Jamie Green	ASM Formule 3	2:04.602	8	1:53.972	2	+ 0.034 s	2
3	30	(Brazil) Fabio Carbone	ThreeBond Racing	2:04.217	4	1:54.078	3	+ 0.140 s	3
4	22	(United Kingdom) Paul di Resta	Manor Motorsport	2:03.723	2	1:54.085	4	+ 0.147 s	4
5	19	(Estonia) Marko Asmer	Carlin Motorsport	2:05.323	15	1:54.115	5	+ 0.177 s	5
6	6	(Germany) Nico Rosberg	Team Rosberg	2:05.238	14	1:54.129	6	+ 0.191 s	6
7	26	(Brazil) Lucas di Grassi	Hitech Racing	2:04.466	7	1:54.135	7	+ 0.197 s	7
8	24	(Japan) Kazuki Nakajima	TOM'S	2:04.395	5	1:54.347	8	+ 0.409 s	8
9	23	(United States) Richard Antinucci	TOM'S	2:04.397	6	1:54.433	9	+ 0.495 s	9
10	10	(France) Eric Salignon	ASM Formule 3	2:05.751	23	1:54.447	10	+ 0.509 s	10
11	4	(Italy) Ronnie Quintarelli	Inging	2:05.382	16	1:54.522	11	+ 0.584 s	11
12	18	(Brazil) Danilo Dirani	Carlin Motorsport	2:05.783	24	1:54.576	12	+ 0.638 s	12
13	7	(Brazil) Nelson Piquet Jr.	Piquet Sports	2:04.627	9	1:54.586	13	+ 0.648 s	13
14	16	(Italy) Matteo Cressoni	Ombra Racing	2:04.155	3	1:54.671	14	+ 0.733 s	14
15	9	(France) Alexandre Prémat	ASM Formule 3	2:05.744	22	1:54.702	15	+ 0.764 s	15
16	17	(Italy) Davide Mazzoleni	Ombra Racing	2:06.141	28	1:54.704	16	+ 0.766 s	16
17	5	(Japan) Naoki Yokomizo	Inging	2:04.916	11	1:54.830	17	+ 0.892 s	17
18	2	(France) Loic Duval	Signature Team	2:04.983	12	1:54.902	18	+ 0.964 s	18
19	11	(Venezuela) Ernesto Viso	Menu Motorsport	2:06.109	27	1:55.012	19	+ 1.074 s	19
20	15	(Japan) Kohei Hirate	Prema Powerteam	2:05.691	21	1:55.149	20	+ 1.211 s	20
21	27	(China) Ho-Pin Tung	Hitech Racing	2:05.596	20	1:55.226	21	+ 1.288 s	21
22	21	(United Kingdom) Lewis Hamilton	Manor Motorsport	2:03.307	1	1:55.227	22	+ 1.289 s	22
23	12	(United Kingdom) Rob Austin	Menu Motorsport	2:05.400	18	1:55.300	23	+ 1.362 s	23
24	29	(Netherlands) Ross Zwolsman	TME-Racing	2:05.826	25	1:55.456	24	+ 1.518 s	24
25	1	(Netherlands) Giedo van der Garde	Signature Team	2:05.840	26	1:55.566	25	+ 1.628 s	25
26	32	(Japan) Daisuke Ikeda	Swiss Racing Team	2:05.383	17	1:55.971	26	+ 2.033 s	26
27	28	(Republic of Ireland) John O'Gara	TME-Racing	2:06.771	29	1:56.225	27	+ 2.287 s	27
28	25	(Australia) Barton Mayer	Hitech Racing	2:05.547	19	1:56.352	28	+ 2.414 s	28
29	31	(Australia) Karl Reindler	Swiss Racing Team	2:07.566	30	1:56.480	29	+ 2.542 s	29
30	20	(Macau) Rodolfo Avila	Carlin Motorsport	2:08.240	31	1:57.234	30	+ 3.296 s	30
31	3	(United Kingdom) James Rossiter	Signature Team	2:04.782	10	2:04.782	31	+ 10.844 s	31

=== Qualifying race ===
Pos	No	Driver	Team	Laps	Time / Retired	Grid
1	8	(United Kingdom) Jamie Green	ASM Formule 3	8	15min 17.433sec	2
2	30	(Brazil) Fabio Carbone	ThreeBond Racing	8	+ 3.357 s	3
3	6	(Germany) Nico Rosberg	Team Rosberg	8	+ 5.552 s	6
4	19	(Estonia) Marko Asmer	Carlin Motorsport	8	+ 9.585 s	5
5	23	(United States) Richard Antinucci	TOM'S	8	+ 9.933	9
6	22	(United Kingdom) Paul di Resta	Manor Motorsport	8	+ 10.642 s	4
7	7	(Brazil) Nelson Piquet Jr.	Piquet Sports	8	+ 11.547 s	13
8	26	(Brazil) Lucas di Grassi	Hitech Racing	8	+ 12.404 s	7
9	24	(Japan) Kazuki Nakajima	TOM'S	8	+ 12.879 s	2
10	4	(Italy) Ronnie Quintarelli	Inging	8	+ 13.179 s	11
11	21	(United Kingdom) Lewis Hamilton	Manor Motorsport	8	+ 15.575 s	22
12	10	(France) Eric Salignon	ASM Formule 3	8	+ 16.638 s	10
13	1	(Netherlands) Giedo van der Garde	Signature Team	8	+ 19.879 s	25
14	5	(Japan) Naoki Yokomizo	Inging	8	+ 20.211 s	17
15	29	(Netherlands) Ross Zwolsman	TME-Racing	8	+ 21.321 s	24
16	12	(United Kingdom) Rob Austin	Menu Motorsport	8	+ 23.997 s	23
17	11	(Venezuela) Ernesto Viso	Menu Motorsport	8	+ 25.117 s	19
18	2	(France) Loic Duval	Signature Team	8	+ 25.858 s	18
19	3	(United Kingdom) James Rossiter	Signature Team	8	+ 28.015 s	31
20	32	(Japan) Daisuke Ikeda	Swiss Racing Team	8	+ 28.792 s	26
21	14	(France) Franck Perera	Prema Powerteam	8	+ 28.861 s	1
22	15	(Japan) Kohei Hirate	Prema Powerteam	8	+ 29.913 s	20
23	17	(Italy) Davide Mazzoleni	Ombra Racing	8	+ 31.388 s	16
24	18	(Brazil) Danilo Dirani	Carlin Motorsport	8	+ 32.617 s	12
25	27	(China) Ho-Pin Tung	Hitech Racing	8	+ 34.652 s	21
26	31	(Australia) Karl Reindler	Swiss Racing Team	8	+ 36.704 s	29
27	25	(Australia) Barton Mawer	Hitech Racing	8	+ 40.286 s	28
28	20	(Macau) Rodolfo Avila	Carlin Motorsport	8	+ 43.926 s	30
29	9	(France) Alexandre Prémat	ASM Formule 3	6	+ 2 Laps	15
30	28	(Republic of Ireland) John O'Gara	TME-Racing	5	+ 3 Laps	27
31	16	(Italy) Matteo Cressoni	Ombra Racing	4	+ 4 Laps	14

=== Race ===
Pos	No	Driver	Team	Laps	Time / Retired	Grid
1	21	(United Kingdom) Lewis Hamilton	Manor Motorsport	20	47min 11.528sec	11
2	6	(Germany) Nico Rosberg	Team Rosberg	20	+ 0.794 s	3
3	8	(United Kingdom) Jamie Green	ASM Formule 3	20	+ 4.701 s	1
4	3	(United Kingdom) James Rossiter	Signature Team	20	+ 5.747 s	19
5	30	(Brazil) Fabio Carbone	ThreeBond Racing	20	+ 7.803 s	2
6	19	(Estonia) Marko Asmer	Carlin Motorsport	20	+ 7.863 s	4
7	24	(Japan) Kazuki Nakajima	TOM'S	20	+ 8.494 s	9
8	2	(France) Loic Duval	Signature Team	20	+ 9.433 s	18
9	9	(France) Alexandre Premat	ASM Formule 3	20	+ 9.958 s	29
10	11	(Venezuela) Ernesto Viso	Menu Motorsport	20	+ 10.144 s	17
11	5	(Japan) Naoki Yokomizo	Inging	20	+ 11.361 s	14
12	15	(Japan) Kohei Hirate	Prema Powerteam	20	+ 11.416 s	22
13	28	(Republic of Ireland) John O'Hara	TME-Racing	20	+ 11.699 s	30
14	10	(France) Eric Salignon	ASM Formule 3	20	+ 11.824 s	12
15	1	(Netherlands) Giedo van der Garde	Signature Team	20	+ 12.694 s	13
16	16	(Italy) Matteo Cressoni	Ombra Racing	20	+ 12.871 s	31
17	17	(Italy) Davide Mazzoleni	Ombra Racing	20	+ 13.656 s	23
18	31	(Australia) Karl Reindler	Swiss Racing Team	20	+ 13.725 s	26
19	26	(Brazil) Lucas di Grassi	Hitech Racing	20	+ 33.983 s	8
20	14	(France) Franck Perera	Prema Powerteam	19	+ 1 Lap	21
21	23	(United States) Richard Antinucci	TOM'S	18	+ 2 Laps	5
22	4	(Italy) Ronnie Quintarelli	Inging	18	+ 2 Laps	10
Ret	27	(China) Ho-Pin Tung	Hitech Racing	16	Retired	25
Ret	32	(Japan) Daisuke Ikeda	Swiss Racing Team	16	Retired	20
Ret	12	(United Kingdom) Rob Austin	Menu Motorsport	14	Retired	16
Ret	25	(Australia) Barton Mawer	Hitech Racing	12	Retired	27
Ret	22	(United Kingdom) Paul di Resta	Manor Motorsport	10	Retired	6
Ret	7	(Brazil) Nelson Piquet Jr.	Piquet Sports	4	Retired	7
Ret	18	(Brazil) Danilo Dirani	Carlin Motorsport	1	Retired	24
Ret	29	(Netherlands) Ross Zwolsman	TME-Racing	0	Retired	15
DNS	20	(Macau) Rodolfo Avila	Carlin Motorsport		Did Not Start	

== See also ==
- Bahrain Super Prix
