= 2001 Formula Renault 2.0 UK Championship =

Motor racing competition

Seasons
- ← 2000 2002 →

The 2001 Formula Renault UK season was the 13th British Formula Renault Championship. The season ended after thirteen rounds held in the United Kingdom. 43 drivers competed in this series. All driver used the Tatuus FR2000 (Renault) car.

== Teams and drivers ==
Team	No.	Driver name	Rounds
Manor Motorsport	1	(Canada) James Eaton	1–7, 9–13
Manor Motorsport	2	(Republic of Ireland) Matt Griffin	All
Manor Motorsport	3	(United States) Richard Antinucci	All
Manor Motorsport	4	(United Kingdom) Leighton Walker	1–4
Manor Motorsport	4	(United Kingdom) Chris Buncombe	5–13
Cliff Dempsey Racing	5	(Republic of Ireland) Keith Dempsey	6–13
Falcon Motorsport	6	(United Kingdom) Danny Watts	All
Falcon Motorsport	7	(United Kingdom) Daniel Welch	1–7
Falcon Motorsport	7	(United Kingdom) Simon Pearson	8–12
Falcon Motorsport	7	(United Kingdom) Jim Edwards Jr.	13
Paston Racing	8	(United States) Vincent Apple	1–9
Paston Racing	9	(South Africa) Martin Steyn	All
Paston Racing	12	(Japan) Hayanari Shimoda	13
Aztec International	10	(United Kingdom) Chris Buncombe	1–4
Aztec International	10	(United Kingdom) Alex Buncombe	5–6, 8–13
Aztec International	10	(United Kingdom) Gary Catt	7
Aztec International	11	(United Kingdom) Andrew Thompson	1–11
Aztec International	11	(United Kingdom) Colin Brown	12–13
Aztec International	12	(United Kingdom) Robert Huff	7
Fortec Motorsports	15	(United Kingdom) Steven Woodley	All
Fortec Motorsports	16	(Finland) Heikki Kovalainen	All
Fortec Motorsports	17	(France) James Andanson	3–7
Fortec Motorsports	17	(Republic of Ireland) Robby Coleman	8–9
Fortec Motorsports	17	(United Kingdom) Robert Bell	10–11
Fortec Motorsports	17	(United Kingdom) Ryan Sharp	12
Team DFR	18	(United Kingdom) Colin Brown	1–6
Team DFR	18	(Republic of Ireland) Gordon Coleman	8–9
Team DFR	18	(United Kingdom) Judd Coupland	10–13
Team DFR	19	(Republic of Ireland) Robby Coleman	1–6
Team DFR	20	(France) Julien Piguet	4
Team DFR	20	(United Kingdom) John Dalziel	9–13
Scorpio Motorsport	23	(United Kingdom) Robert Huff	1–4
Scorpio Motorsport	23	(United Kingdom) Charles Hall	12
Scorpio Motorsport	24	(Republic of Ireland) Peter Walsh	1
Scorpio Motorsport	34	(United Kingdom) Michael Grime	9–13
Mach 1 Racing	25	(United Kingdom) Stuart Turvey	1–2
PBR Racing/Team Brask	27	(Denmark) Allan Simonsen	1–5
Motaworld Racing	30	(United Kingdom) Carl Breeze	All
Motaworld Racing	31	(United Kingdom) Tom Herridge	All
Motaworld Racing	32	(Brazil) Luis Mussi	1–5
Motaworld Racing	32	(United Kingdom) Tom Sisley	6–13
Motaworld Racing	33	(United Kingdom) Mark McLoughlin	1–11
Motaworld Racing	33	(United Kingdom) Andrew Thompson	12–13
Mark Burdett Motorsport	55	(United Kingdom) Chaz Small	9–12
Saxon International	76	(United Kingdom) Katherine Legge	13
Saxon International	77	(United Kingdom) Charles Hall	1–3
Saxon International	77	(United Kingdom) Jason Coffin	4
Saxon International	77	(United Kingdom) Stuart King	5–13
Saxon International	78	(Malaysia) Fairuz Fauzy	All

== Race calendar and results ==
Round	Circuit	Date	Pole position	Fastest lap	Winning driver	Winning team
1	Brands Hatch (Indy), Kent	16 April	(United Kingdom) Carl Breeze	(United States) Richard Antinucci	(United Kingdom) Carl Breeze	Motaworld Racing
2	Thruxton Circuit, Hampshire	7 May	(United States) Richard Antinucci	(United States) Richard Antinucci	(United States) Richard Antinucci	Manor Motorsport
3	Oulton Park (Island), Cheshire	20 May	(United Kingdom) Carl Breeze	(United Kingdom) Carl Breeze	(United Kingdom) Carl Breeze	Motaworld Racing
4	Silverstone Circuit (International), Northamptonshire	2 June	(United States) Richard Antinucci	(United Kingdom) Danny Watts	(United Kingdom) Danny Watts	Falcon Motorsport
5	Donington Park (GP), Leicestershire	1 July	(United Kingdom) Carl Breeze	(Finland) Heikki Kovalainen	(United States) Richard Antinucci	Manor Motorsport
6	Knockhill Circuit, Fife	22 July	(France) James Andanson	(United Kingdom) Carl Breeze	(United Kingdom) Danny Watts	Falcon Motorsport
7	Snetterton Circuit, Norfolk	4 August	(United Kingdom) Carl Breeze	(United Kingdom) Stuart King	(Republic of Ireland) Keith Dempsey	Cliff Dempsey Racing
8	Croft Circuit, North Yorkshire	11 August	(United Kingdom) Carl Breeze	(United Kingdom) Carl Breeze	(United Kingdom) Carl Breeze	Motaworld Racing
9	Oulton Park (Island), Cheshire	26 August	(United Kingdom) Carl Breeze	(United Kingdom) Tom Sisley	(United Kingdom) Carl Breeze	Motaworld Racing
10	Silverstone Circuit (International), Northamptonshire	9 September	(Finland) Heikki Kovalainen	(Finland) Heikki Kovalainen	(Finland) Heikki Kovalainen	Fortec Motorsports
11	Silverstone Circuit (International), Northamptonshire	9 September	(Finland) Heikki Kovalainen	(Finland) Heikki Kovalainen	(Finland) Heikki Kovalainen	Fortec Motorsports
12	Donington Park (GP), Leicestershire	23 September	(United States) Richard Antinucci	(United States) Richard Antinucci	(United States) Richard Antinucci	Manor Motorsport
13	Brands Hatch (GP), Kent	7 October	(United States) Richard Antinucci	(United States) Richard Antinucci	(United States) Richard Antinucci	Manor Motorsport

== Drivers' Championship ==
- Points were awarded on a 32-28-25-22-20-18-16-14-12-11-10-9-8-7-6-5-4-3-2-1 basis, with 1 point for fastest lap. A driver's 12 best results counted towards the championship.

Pos	Driver	BHI	THR	OUL	SIL	DON	KNO	SNE	CRO	OUL	SIL		DON	BGP	Pts
Pos	Driver	1	2	3	4	5	6	7	8	9	10	11	12	13	Pts
1	(United Kingdom) Carl Breeze	**1**	2	**1**	2	**2**	4	**2**	**1**	**1**	3	3	3	(5)	343
2	(United States) Richard Antinucci	2	**1**	2	**3**	1	2	Ret	8	4	2	2	**1**	**1**	337
3	(United Kingdom) Danny Watts	4	3	Ret	1	5	1	9	2	Ret	7	4	5	4	253
4	(Finland) Heikki Kovalainen	15	14	Ret	7	18	5	5	5	2	**1**	**1**	2	3	243
5	(United Kingdom) Tom Sisley						6	Ret	3	3	Ret	7	4	2	136
6	(Republic of Ireland) Matt Griffin	Ret	8	10	6	7	DNS	Ret	7	8	8	18	11	7	136
7	(Malaysia) Fairuz Fauzy	9	6	Ret	Ret	4	11	3	Ret	10	10	10	13	15	134
8	(Republic of Ireland) Keith Dempsey						9	1	4	13	5	5	11	13	132
9	(South Africa) Martin Steyn	Ret	10	14	19	12	7	11	9	9	6	8	14	9	130
10	(United Kingdom) Chris Buncombe	Ret	Ret	9	8	16	10	12	6	6	9	Ret	8	11	123
11	(United Kingdom) Colin Brown	5	4	7	10	8	12						Ret	7	108
12	(United Kingdom) Mark McLoughlin	DNS	13	3	4	3	3	Ret	Ret	Ret	Ret	DNS			105
13	(United Kingdom) Leighton Walker	3	5	5	5										85
14	(United Kingdom) Tom Herridge	Ret	16	Ret	12	15	DNS	8	14	5	12	Ret	Ret	12	79
15	(United States) Vincent Apple	7	7	Ret	16	9	DNS	6	16	16					77
16	(France) James Andanson			4	Ret	6	**13**	4							70
17	(United Kingdom) Stuart King					14	DNS	Ret	13	7	Ret	Ret	9	6	63
18	(United Kingdom) John Dalziel									Ret	4	6	15	8	60
19	(Republic of Ireland) Robby Coleman	6	12	15	15	11	DNS		10	Ret					60
20	(United Kingdom) Andrew Thompson	Ret	15	Ret	Ret	Ret	8	10	12	11	19	13	Ret	Ret	60
21	(United Kingdom) Daniel Welch	11	9	11	14	10	14	Ret							57
22	(United Kingdom) Steven Woodley	12	Ret	Ret	18	17	Ret	14	11	15	16	15	16	Ret	55
23	(United Kingdom) Alex Buncombe					13	15		Ret	17	14	12	12	10	54
24	(Brazil) Luis Mussi	10	Ret	6	9	Ret									41
25	(Canada) James Eaton	Ret	Ret	13	11	Ret	Ret	13		12	Ret	14	18	Ret	38
26	(Denmark) Allan Simonsen	13	11	12	17	Ret									31
27	(United Kingdom) Robert Huff	8	Ret	Ret	Ret			7							30
28	(United Kingdom) Charles Hall	Ret	Ret	8									9		25
29	(United Kingdom) Robert Bell										11	9			22
30	(United Kingdom) Chaz Small									14	15	17	17		21
31	(United Kingdom) Ryan Sharp												6		18
32	(United Kingdom) Judd Coupland										17	14	20	16	17
33	(United Kingdom) Simon Pearson								DSQ	18	13	Ret	19		13
34	(United Kingdom) Jason Coffin				13										8
35	(United Kingdom) Michael Grime									Ret	18	16	21	Ret	8
36	(United Kingdom) Stuart Turvey	14	Ret												7
37	(Republic of Ireland) Gordon Coleman								15	Ret					6
38	(United Kingdom) Jim Edwards Jr.													17	4
39	(United Kingdom) Katherine Legge													18	3
	(Republic of Ireland) Peter Walsh	Ret													
	(France) Julien Piguet				Ret										
	(United Kingdom) Gary Catt							Ret							
	(Japan) Hayanari Shimoda													Ret	

Colour	Result
Gold	Winner
Silver	Second place
Bronze	Third place
Green	Points classification
Blue	Non-points classification
Blue	Non-classified finish (NC)
Purple	Retired, not classified (Ret)
Red	Did not qualify (DNQ)
Red	Did not pre-qualify (DNPQ)
Black	Disqualified (DSQ)
White	Did not start (DNS)
White	Withdrew (WD)
White	Race cancelled (C)
Blank	Did not practice (DNP)
Blank	Did not arrive (DNA)
Blank	Excluded (EX)

**Bold** – Pole
Italics – Fastest Lap
