= Matt Griffin (racing driver) =

Irish racing driver (born 1982)

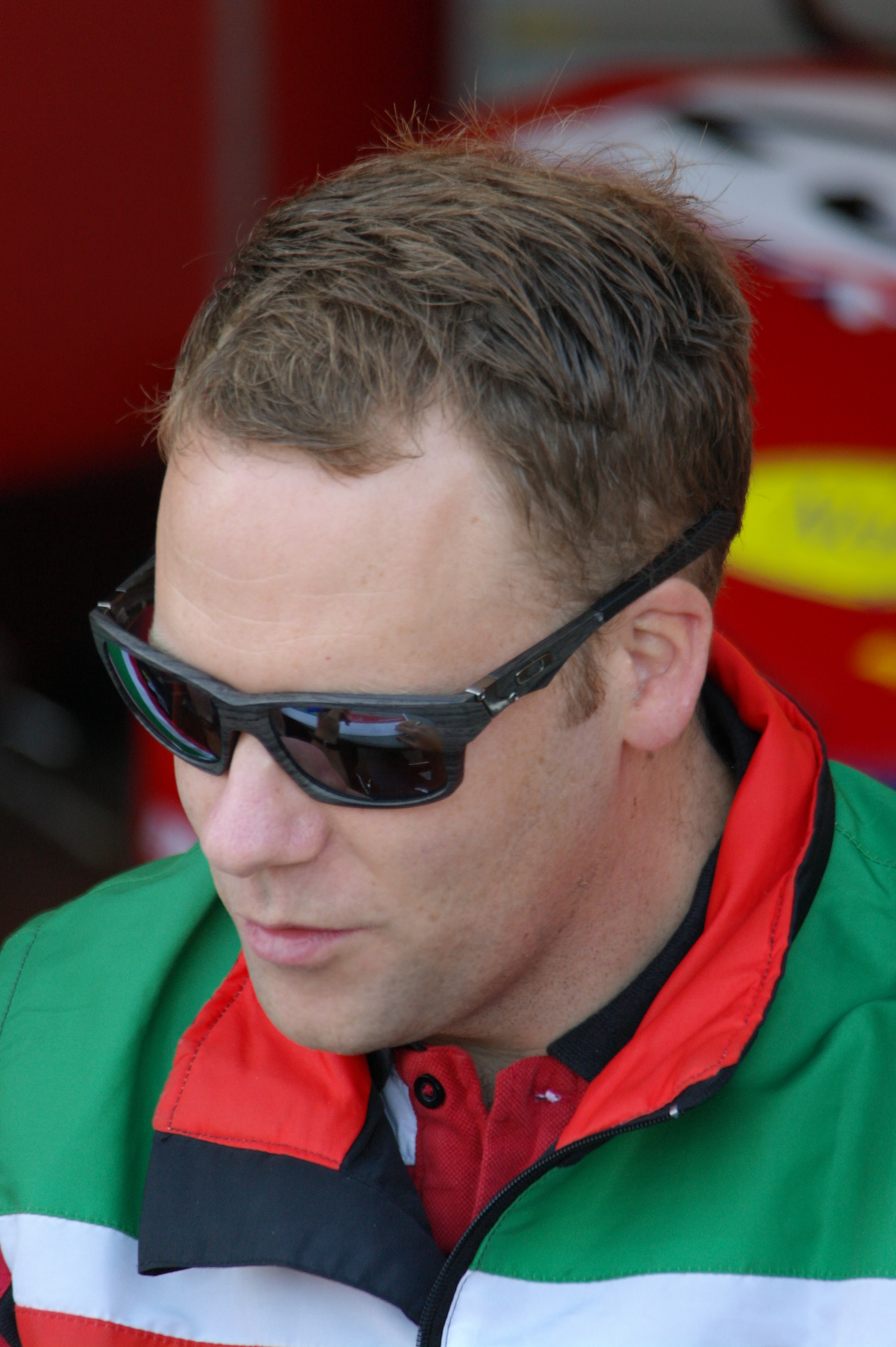
- Griffin at Brands Hatch in 2014
- Nationality: (Republic of Ireland) Irish
- Born: Matthew John Griffin; 1 October 1982 (age 44) Blarney, Ireland

European Le Mans Series career
- Debut season: 2008
- Current team: Spirit of Race
- Categorisation: FIA Silver (until 2013); FIA Gold (2014–)
- Car number: 55
- Former teams: Ram Racing; James Watt Automotive
- Starts: 61
- Wins: 10
- Podiums: 25
- Poles: 5

Previous series
- 2008–2015, 2017–2019 2003–2014, 2017, 2020, 2025 2001–2002: International GT Open; British GT Championship; Formula Renault 2.0 UK

Championship titles
- 2024 2015 2013 2003: GT Winter Series – Cup 1 Blancpain Endurance Series – Pro-Am; European Le Mans Series – GTE; British GT Championship – GTC

Matthew John Griffin (born 1 October 1982) is an Irish racing driver who last competed in the British GT Championship for Barwell Motorsport and the European Le Mans Series for Spirit of Race.

A Ferrari specialist in sports car racing, Griffin boasts titles in ELMS, British GT and the Blancpain Endurance Series, class victories at the 24 Hours of Spa and an overall win at the inaugural Gulf 12 Hours. He has twice won in the FIA World Endurance Championship, both at Silverstone in LMGTE Am.

== Career ==
Griffin made his single-seater debut in 2001, racing for Manor Motorsport in Formula Renault 2.0 UK. After two years in the championship, Griffin switched to the British GT Championship, racing for Tech 9 Motorsport in the GT Cup class. In his first season in the series, Griffin won the GT Cup title after taking eight wins in 11 races.

During the following four seasons, Griffin raced part-time in the series for Emotional Engineering and Team RPM, along with a one-off appearance in Porsche Carrera Cup Great Britain in 2007. Griffin then returned to full-time British GT Championship competition in 2008, racing in the GT3 class for Chad Racing. However, that year was headlined by Griffin's maiden campaign in International GT Open, where he won at Monza with Advanced Engineering, as he began a long-term relationship with the Ferrari brand. He returned for the 2009 International GT Open season, but his biggest highlight that year came with Mtech Racing in the British GT Championship, winning at Silverstone alongside Duncan Cameron.

In 2010, Griffin joined AF Corse in GT Open and Mtech Racing in British GT. In the former, he ran in the Super GT class for all but one rounds and was 22nd in points, otherwise winning at Brands Hatch in a one-off GTS appearance for Mtech. In the latter, he won both races at Oulton Park and race two at Snetterton to secure third in points. For 2011, Griffin expanded his Mtech commitments to the FIA GT3 European Championship but enjoyed more success at national level, placing fifth in the British GT Championship with a win at Spa. He also linked up with AF Corse in the new Blancpain Endurance Series, scoring a Pro-Am podium at the marquee 24 Hours of Spa.

Griffin started off 2012 by winning the inaugural Gulf 12 Hours alongside Marco Cioci and Piergiuseppe Perazzini, before joining the pair for a dual European Le Mans Series and FIA World Endurance Championship programme. While they missed out on the ELMS title after retiring at Petit Le Mans, they did achieve a landmark WEC victory at Silverstone. Griffin also won once in British GT at the Nürburgring en route to fourth in the standings.

Kicking off 2013 with a second-place finish at the Bathurst 12 Hour for Clearwater Racing, Griffin returned to AF Corse for the rest of the year, racing with them in the LMGTE Am class of the FIA World Endurance Championship, along with a part-time schedule in International GT Open. In WEC, Griffin took class podiums at Le Mans and Bahrain on his way to ninth in the LMGTE Am standings, whereas in GT Open, Griffin took four wins and placed fifth in the Super GT standings. Griffin and Cameron also featured at the 2013 24 Hours of Spa, where they, along with Alex Mortimer and works driver Toni Vilander, claimed a historic Pro-Am victory and fifth place overall aboard their Ferrari 458 Italia GT3. The icing on the cake would come in the European Le Mans Series with Ram Racing, as Griffin and Johnny Mowlem won three out of the five races and finished no lower than second in the other two to clinch the GTE title.

Griffin returned to Ram Racing for his LMGTE Pro debut in the 2014 FIA World Endurance Championship, but when that program was cut short due to a lack of funding three races in, Griffin returned to AF Corse to race in both the European Le Mans Series and International GT Open. Racing in the LMGTE class in ELMS, Griffin won at Silverstone, Red Bull Ring and Le Castellet to end the season runner-up by 3.5 points. In 2015, Griffin remained with AF Corse to race in both the European Le Mans Series and the Blancpain Endurance Series. In the former, he scored podiums at Silverstone and Red Bull Ring to finish third in LMGTE, whereas in the latter, he took the Pro-Am title despite not taking any class wins in the five-race season.

Staying with AF Corse for 2016, Griffin raced with them in both the European Le Mans Series and the Blancpain GT Series Endurance Cup. He clinched back-to-back podiums in the final two races of the former to end the season sixth in the GTE standings, but only managed one Pro-Am class podium in the latter. At the end of the year, Griffin raced for Clearwater Racing in the 2016–17 Asian Le Mans Series, taking a lone podium at Zhuhai en route to a fifth-place points finish.

In 2017, Griffin reunited with Clearwater Racing for his full-time return to FIA World Endurance Championship competition, whilst he and Cameron joined AF Corse satellite squad Spirit of Race in both the European Le Mans Series and the British GT Championship. In WEC, Griffin won at Silverstone and scored five more class podiums to end the year a career-best third in GTE Am. With Spirit of Race, Griffin won at both Red Bull Ring and Le Castellet to finish fourth in ELMS, while taking two overall podiums in British GT at Rockingham, where Griffin lost his only win due to a post-race penalty, and Silverstone on his way to seventh in points.

In 2018, Griffin raced for AF Corse in the Blancpain GT Series Endurance Cup and Spirit of Race in the LMGTE class of the European Le Mans Series. In the former, he took a Pro-Am win at Le Castellet and two further podiums to finish runner-up in class at season's end. In the latter, he won at Monza and took three more podiums to end the year fifth in the LMGTE standings. Griffin then rejoined Clearwater Racing to tackle the 2018–19 FIA World Endurance Championship. In the series' "Super Season", Griffin finished third at both Spa rounds as well as the 2019 24 Hours of Le Mans en route to a fifth-place points finish in LMGTE Am, in the team's last season in motorsports. During 2019, Griffin also competed in the European Le Mans Series and International GT Open for Spirit of Race, registering a pair of LMGTE podiums in the former and winning once at Hockenheimring in a reduced Pro-Am schedule in the latter.

In 2020, Griffin and Cameron, together with Aaron Scott, won once in the European Le Mans Series at Le Castellet to come third in LMGTE, some 37 points behind a dead heat between the Proton Competition Porsche and Kessel Racing Ferrari. A part-time effort in the British GT Championship yielded little in the way of results. The pair continued in the European Le Mans Series in 2021 with a new silver-graded teammate, David Perel. They took three podiums in the first three races, but the death of his father led Griffin to miss the round at Monza and give up his title hopes. Perel and Cameron were runners-up. That year, Griffin and Cameron also combined for a part-time GT World Challenge Europe Endurance Cup schedule with AF Corse, steering their Ferrari 488 GT3 to a second Pro-Am win at the 24 Hours of Spa, with the help of Rino Mastronardi and factory driver Miguel Molina.

Scaling back to just European Le Mans with Spirit of Race for 2022, Griffin and his teammates stood on the podium twice to end up tenth in points despite skipping the final two rounds. In the last ever year of LMGTE regulations in 2023, the trio improved to fifth with a podium at the season finale. Griffin stayed put with Spirit of Race in ELMS in 2024, regressing to ninth in the standings but winning at Le Castellet as he learned the Ferrari 296 in the new LMGT3 class. Griffin remained in the European Le Mans Series in 2025, whilst also returning to the British GT Championship after a five-year hiatus. In his 12th full-time season in ELMS, Griffin scored a lone podium at Imola by finishing third in LMGT3 to end the year sixth in points.

The following year, Griffin joined Lamborghini-linked Barwell Motorsport to race in the British GT Championship, as well as returning to Spirit of Race for another season in the European Le Mans Series. Griffin found more success in the latter, taking a best result of fourth at Le Castellet to end the year ninth in LMGT3.

== Racing record ==
=== Racing career summary ===
Season	Series	Team	Races	Wins	Poles	F/Laps	Podiums	Points	Position
2001	Formula Renault 2.0 UK	Manor Motorsport	12	0	0	0	0	136	6th
2002	Formula Renault 2.0 UK	Manor Motorsport	13	0	0	0	0	116	11th
2003	British GT Championship – GT Cup	Gruppe M Tech 9 Motorsport	11	8			8	216	**1st**
2004	British GT Championship – NGT	Emotional Engineering	11	0			0	6	33rd
2005	British GT Championship – GT2	Emotional Engineering	4	0	0	0	0	0	NC
2005	British GT Championship – G2	Emotional Engineering	1	1			1	2	16th
2005	FIA GT Championship – G2	Emotional Engineering	1	1			1	0	NC
2006	British GT Championship – GT2	Emotional Engineering	2	0	0	0	0	3	18th
2006	British GT Championship – GTC	Team RPM	3	0	0	0	0	1	44th
2007	British GT Championship – GT3	Team RPM	12	0	0	0	0	1	30th
2007	Porsche Carrera Cup Great Britain	Team RPM	2	0	0	0	0	22	14th
2008	24H Series – A6	Team RPM	1	0	0	0	0	12	17th
2008	International GT Open – GTA	Advanced Engineering	12	1	0	0	1	10	18th
2008	British GT Championship – GT3	Chad Racing	12	0	0	1	0	18	18th
2008	Le Mans Series – GT2	James Watt Automotive	1	0	0	0	0	0	NC
2009	International GT Open – Super GT	Advanced Engineering	12	0	0	0	0	3	13th
2009	Le Mans Series – GT2	Advanced Engineering	3	0	0	0	0	0	NC
2009	International GT Open – Pro-Am	Mtech Racing	2	1	0	0	2	16	11th
2009	British GT Championship – GT3	Mtech Racing	8	1	2	0	2	29	15th
2010	International GT Open – Super GT	AF Corse	12	0	1	0	1	6	14th
2010	International GT Open – GTS	Mtech Racing	2	1	0	1	2	19	12th
2010	British GT Championship – GT3	Mtech Racing	13	3	0	2	6	75	**3rd**
2010	FIA GT3 European Championship	Black Falcon	1	0	0	0	0	0	NC
2010	FIA GT3 European Championship	Duncan Cameron Racing	1	0	0	0	0	0	NC
2011	Malaysia Merdeka Endurance Race	Clearwater Racing	1	0	0	0	0	N/A	NC
2011	Blancpain Endurance Series – GT3 Pro-Am	AF Corse	4	0	0	0	2	39	8th
2011	Blancpain Endurance Series – GT3 Pro	AF Corse	1	0	0	0	0	6	34th
2011	International GT Open – Super GT	AF Corse	6	0	0	0	0	6	23rd
2011	British GT Championship – GT3	Mtech Racing	7	1	1	2	4	91	5th
2011	FIA GT3 European Championship	Mtech Racing	12	0	0	0	0	24	22nd
2012	Bathurst 12 Hour	Clearwater Racing	1	0	0	0	1	N/A	**3rd**
2012	Malaysia Merdeka Endurance Race	Clearwater Racing	1	0	0	0	0	N/A	NC
2012	Gulf 12 Hours	AF Corse	1	1	0	1	1	N/A	**1st**
2012	Dubai 24 Hour - A6	AF Corse	1	0	0	0	0	N/A	DNF
2012	European Le Mans Series - LMGTE Am	AF Corse	3	0	1	0	2	34	**2nd**
2012	24 Hours of Le Mans – LMGTE Am	AF Corse	1	0	0	0	0	N/A	DNF
2012	FIA World Endurance Championship - LMGTE Am	AF Corse-Waltrip; AF Corse	3	1	0	0	1	/	/
2012	British GT Championship – GT3	Mtech Racing	10	1	1	0	3	119	4th
2012	Blancpain Endurance Series – Pro-Am	Mtech Racing	4	0	0	0	0	15	25th
2012	International GT Open – Super GT	Mtech Racing	2	0	0	0	0	0	NC
2013	Bathurst 12 Hour	Clearwater Racing	1	0	0	1	1	N/A	**2nd**
2013	Australian GT Championship	Clearwater Racing	1	0	0	0	1	25	26th
2013	British GT Championship – GT3	Mtech Racing	2	0	0	0	0	22	19th
2013	British GT Championship – GT3	AF Corse	2	0	0	0	0	22	19th
2013	International GT Open – Super GT	Mtech Racing	2	0	0	0	1	74	5th
2013	International GT Open – Super GT	AF Corse	9	3	1	1	5	74	5th
2013	Blancpain Endurance Series – Pro-Am	AF Corse	1	1	0	0	1	34	11th
2013	FIA World Endurance Championship - LMGTE Am	AF Corse	8	0	0	1	2	68	9th
2013	24 Hours of Le Mans – LMGTE Am	AF Corse	1	0	0	0	0	N/A	**3rd**
2013	European Le Mans Series – LMGTE	Ram Racing	5	3	2	1	5	114	**1st**
2014	United SportsCar Championship – GTD	Spirit of Race	4	0	0	0	0	63	37th
2014	Dubai 24 Hour - A6 Pro	Ram Racing	1	0	0	0	0	N/A	11th
2014	FIA World Endurance Championship - LMGTE Pro	Ram Racing	2	0	0	0	0	0	NC
2014	24 Hours of Le Mans – LMGTE Pro	Ram Racing	1	0	0	0	0	N/A	DNF
2014	Bathurst 12 Hour	Clearwater Racing	1	0	0	0	0	N/A	DNF
2014	Asian Le Mans Series – GT	Clearwater Racing	1	1	0	1	2	25	7th
2014	GT Asia Series	Clearwater Racing	2	0	0	0	1	27	22nd
2014	6 Hours of Vallelunga	AF Corse	1	0	0	0	1	N/A	**3rd**
2014	International GT Open – GTS	AF Corse	14	1	0	1	4	42	7th
2014	European Le Mans Series – LMGTE	AF Corse	5	3	0	1	3	81.5	**2nd**
2014	Blancpain Endurance Series – Pro-Am	AF Corse	1	0	0	0	0	1	27th
2014	British GT Championship – GT3	AF Corse	1	0	0	0	0	15	30th
2015	24H Series – A6 Am	Dragon Racing	1	1	0	0	1	0	NC
2015	United SportsCar Championship – GTD	AF Corse	1	0	0	0	0	29	35th
2015	6 Hours of Vallelunga	AF Corse	1	0	0	0	0	N/A	NC
2015	International GT Open – Pro-Am	AF Corse	8	0	1	0	2	27	6th
2015	Blancpain Endurance Series – Pro-Am	AF Corse	5	0	0	1	3	88	**1st**
2015	European Le Mans Series – LMGTE	AF Corse	5	0	1	1	2	62	**3rd**
2015	FIA World Endurance Championship - LMGTE Am	AF Corse	2	0	0	0	0	0	NC
2015	24 Hours of Le Mans – LMGTE Am	AF Corse	1	0	0	0	0	N/A	DNF
2015	Bathurst 12 Hour – AP	Clearwater Racing	1	0	0	0	0	N/A	6th
2015	Sepang 12 Hours – GT	Clearwater Racing	1	0	0	0	0	N/A	NC
2015	GT Asia Series	Clearwater Racing	8	0	0	0	1	57	19th
2016	24H Series – A6 Pro	Dragon Racing	1	0	0	0	1	0	NC
2016	FIA World Endurance Championship - LMGTE Am	AF Corse	1	0	0	1	0	12	15th
2016	24 Hours of Le Mans – LMGTE Am	AF Corse	1	0	0	0	0	N/A	11th
2016	Blancpain GT Series Endurance Cup – Pro-Am	AF Corse	4	0	0	0	1	43	8th
2016	European Le Mans Series – GTE	AF Corse	6	0	0	0	2	64	6th
2016	Gulf 12 Hours – Pro	Dragon Racing	1	0	0	0	1	—N/a	**2nd**
2016–17	Asian Le Mans Series – GT	Clearwater Racing	4	0	0	0	1	44	5th
2017	FIA World Endurance Championship - LMGTE Am	Clearwater Racing	9	1	0	1	5	165	**3rd**
2017	24 Hours of Le Mans – LMGTE Am	Clearwater Racing	1	0	0	0	0	N/A	6th
2017	European Le Mans Series – GTE	Spirit of Race	6	2	3	2	2	77	4th
2017	British GT Championship – Pro-Am	Spirit of Race	7	0	0	3	2	92.5	7th
2017	International GT Open – Pro-Am	AF Corse	2	0	0	0	0	6	17th
2017	Intercontinental GT Challenge	AF Corse	1	0	0	0	0	0	NC
2017	Blancpain GT Series Endurance Cup – Pro-Am	AF Corse	1	0	0	0	0	21	22nd
2017	Blancpain GT Series Endurance Cup – Pro-Am	Black Falcon	1	0	0	0	0	21	22nd
2018	IMSA SportsCar Championship – GTD	Risi Competizione	1	0	0	0	0	14	62nd
2018	Blancpain GT Series Endurance Cup – Pro-Am	AF Corse	5	1	0	0	3	89	**2nd**
2018	European Le Mans Series – LMGTE	Spirit of Race	6	1	0	0	4	79	5th
2018	International GT Open – Pro-Am	Luzich Racing	4	0	0	0	0	5	34th
2018	Suzuka 10 Hours	HubAuto Racing	1	0	0	0	0	N/A	24th
2018	24 Hours of Le Mans – LMGTE Am	Clearwater Racing	1	0	0	0	0	N/A	8th
2018–19	FIA World Endurance Championship – LMGTE Am	Clearwater Racing	7	0	0	0	3	95	5th
2019	European Le Mans Series – LMGTE	Spirit of Race	6	0	0	0	2	68	5th
2019	International GT Open – Pro-Am	Spirit of Race	8	1	0	0	4	40	7th
2019	24 Hours of Le Mans – LMGTE Am	Clearwater Racing	1	0	0	0	0	N/A	7th
2020	European Le Mans Series – LMGTE	Spirit of Race	5	1	0	0	2	62	**3rd**
2020	24 Hours of Le Mans – LMGTE Am	Spirit of Race	1	0	0	0	0	N/A	DNF
2020	British GT Championship – GT3 Pro-Am	AF Corse	6	0	0	1	0	55	8th
2020	Le Mans Cup – GT3	Iron Lynx	1	0	0	0	0	10	14th
2021	European Le Mans Series – LMGTE	Spirit of Race	5	0	0	1	3	63	4th
2021	24 Hours of Le Mans – LMGTE Am	Spirit of Race	1	0	0	0	0	N/A	DNF
2021	GT World Challenge Europe Endurance Cup – Pro-Am	AF Corse	3	1	0	0	1	39	12th
2021	Intercontinental GT Challenge	AF Corse	1	0	0	0	0	1	34th
2022	European Le Mans Series – LMGTE	Spirit of Race	4	0	0	0	2	39	10th
2022	24 Hours of Le Mans – LMGTE Am	Spirit of Race	1	0	0	0	0	N/A	10th
2023	European Le Mans Series – LMGTE	Spirit of Race	6	0	0	0	1	55	5th
2023	Italian GT Sprint Championship – GT Cup Pro-Am	Formula Racing	2	0	0	0	0	0	NC
2024	GT Winter Series – Cup 1	AF Corse	12	9	0	0	11	67.495	**1st**
2024	European Le Mans Series – LMGT3	Spirit of Race	6	1	0	0	1	45	9th
2025	GT Winter Series – Cup 1	AF Corse	9	2	0	0	4	132	**3rd**
2025	Middle East Trophy – GT3	Into Africa Racing by Dragon Racing	1	0	0	0	0	0	NC
2025	European Le Mans Series – LMGT3	Spirit of Race	6	0	0	0	1	52	6th
2025	British GT Championship – GT3	Spirit of Race	7	0	0	0	0	36	13th
2025–26	24H Series Middle East - GT3	Dragon Racing	1	0	0	0	0	14	NC
2026	British GT Championship – GT3	Barwell Motorsport	3	0	0	0	0	6	20th
2026	European Le Mans Series – LMGT3	Spirit of Race	6	0	0	0	0	38	9th

=== Complete Formula Renault 2.0 UK Championship results ===
(key) (Races in bold indicate pole position) (Races in italics indicate fastest lap)

Year	Entrant	1	2	3	4	5	6	7	8	9	10	11	12	13	DC	Points
2001	Manor Motorsport	BHI; Ret	THR; 8	OUL; 10	SIL; 6	DON; 7	KNO; DNS	SNE; Ret	CRO; 7	OUL; 8	SIL; 8	SIL; 18	DON; 11	BGP; 7	6th	136
2002	Manor Motorsport	BRH; Ret	OUL; 12	THR; 18	SIL; 7	THR; 4	BRH; 14	CRO; 23	SNE; 16	SNE; 16	KNO; 13	BRH; 12	DON; 7	DON; 7	11th	116

=== Complete British GT Championship results ===
(key) (Races in bold indicate pole position in class) (Races in italics indicate fastest lap in class)

Year	Entrant	Chassis	Class	1	2	3	4	5	6	7	8	9	10	11	12	13	14	15	16	17	DC	Pts
2003	Gruppe M Tech 9 Motorsport	Porsche 996 GT3	GT Cup	DON; 1	SNE; 1	KNO; 1; 1	KNO; 2; 8†	SIL; 1	CAS; 1	OUL; 1	ROC; 1	THR; 1	SPA; Ret	BRH; Ret							1st	216
2004	Emotional Engineering	Vauxhall Monaro	NGT	DON; 1	DON; 2	MON; 1; 8	MON; 2; 8	SNE; 1 Ret	SNE; 2; 9	CAS; 1 Ret	CAS; 2; 8	OUL; 1; 7	OUL; 2; 11	SIL; 1 Ret	SIL; 2 DNS	THR; 1	THR; 2	BRH; 1; 8	BRH; 2 Ret		33rd	6
2005	Emotional Engineering	Vauxhall Monaro	G2			MAG; 1; 1															NC	0
2005	Emotional Engineering	Vauxhall Monaro	GT2	DON; 1 WD	DON; 2 WD		CRO; 1	CRO; 2	KNO; 1 Ret	KNO; 2 WD	THR; 1 DNS	THR; 2 Ret	CAS; 1	CAS; 2	SIL1; 1	SIL1; 2	MON; 1	MON; 2	SIL2; 1; 7	SIL2; 2 Ret	16th	2
2006	Emotional Engineering	Vauxhall Monaro	GT2	OUL; 1 DNS	OUL; 2; 9	DON; Ret	PAU; 1	PAU; 2	MON; 1	MON; 2	SNE; 1	SNE; 2	ROC; 1	ROC; 2							18th	3
2006	Team RPM	Porsche 996 GT3	GTC												BRH; 1; 15	BRH; 2 Ret	SIL; Ret	MAG; 1	MAG; 2		44th	1
2007	Team RPM	Porsche 997 GT3 Cup	GT3	OUL; 1; 8	OUL; 2; 15	DON; 1	DON; 2	SNE; Ret	BRH; 1; 9	BRH; 2 Ret	SIL; 12	THR; 1; 13	THR; 2; 11	CRO; 1; 13	CRO; 2; 11	ROC; 1; 13	ROC; 2; 11				30th	1
2008	Chad Racing	Ferrari F430 GT3	GT3	OUL; 1; 7	OUL; 2; 18	KNO; 1; 8	KNO; 2; 5	ROC; 1; 11	ROC; 2; 5	SNE; 1; 10	SNE; 2; 22	THR; 1; 6	THR; 2; 9	BRH; 1	BRH; 2	DON; Ret	SIL; 5				23rd	18
2009	Mtech Racing	Ferrari F430 GT3	GT3	OUL; 1; 4	OUL; 2; 5																15th	29
2009	Mtech Racing	Ferrari 430 Scuderia	GT3			SPA; 1	SPA; 2	ROC; 1 Ret	ROC; 2 Ret	KNO; 1 Ret	**KNO**; **2**; 7†	SNE; 1	SNE; 2	**DON**; 2	**SIL**; 1	BRH; 1	BRH; 2				15th	29
2010	MTECH	Ferrari 430 Scuderia GT3	GT3	OUL; 1; 1	OUL; 2; 1	KNO; 1; 2	KNO; 2 Ret	SPA; 6	ROC; 1; 5	ROC; 2; 2	SIL; 10	SNE; 1; 8	SNE; 2; 1	BRH; 1; 6	BRH; 2; 6	DON; 3					3rd	75
2011	MTECH Racing	Ferrari 458 Italia GT3	GT3	OUL; 1; 7	OUL; 2 Ret	SNE; 16†	**BRH**; 2	SPA; 1; 2	SPA; 2; 1	ROC; 1; 11	ROC; 2; 3	DON; 3	SIL; 9								4th	116.5
2012	MTECH Racing	Ferrari 458 Italia GT3	GT3	OUL; 1; 3	OUL; 2; 2	NUR; 1; 4	NUR; 2; 1	ROC; 4	BRH; Ret	SNE; 1; 4	SNE; 2; 10	**SIL**; 7	DON; 10								4th	119
2013	MTECH	Ferrari 458 Italia GT3	GT3	OUL; 1; 8	OUL; 2 Ret	ROC															19th	22
2013	AF Corse	Ferrari 458 Italia GT3	GT3				SIL; 4	SNE; 1	SNE; 2	BRH; 21†	ZAN; 1	ZAN; 2	DON								19th	22
2014	AF Corse	Ferrari 458 Italia GT3	GT3	OUL; 1	OUL; 2	ROC	SIL	SNE; 1	SNE; 2	SPA; 1	SPA; 2	BRH; 5	DON								30th	15
2017	Spirit of Race	Ferrari 488 GT3	GT3	OUL; 1; 6	OUL; 2; 4	ROC; 2	SNE; 1; 6	SNE; 2; 7	SIL; 3	SPA; 1 DNS	SPA; 2 DNS	BRH; 7	DON								7th	92.5
2020	AF Corse	Ferrari 488 GT3	GT3 Pro-Am	OUL; 1; 9	OUL; 2 Ret	DON1; 1; 10	DON1; 2; 10	BRH	DON2	SNE; 1; 12	SNE; 2; 11	SIL									8th	55
2025	Spirit of Race	Ferrari 296 GT3	GT3	DON1	SIL; Ret	OUL; 1; 7	OUL; 2; 9	SPA; 7	SNE; 1; 7	SNE; 2; 10	BRH	DON2; 7									13th	36
2026	Barwell Motorsport	Lamborghini Huracán GT3 Evo 2	GT3	SIL; 12	OUL; 1; 9	OUL; 2; 10	SPA	SNE; 1	SNE; 2	DON	BRH										20th	6

=== Complete European Le Mans Series results ===
(key) (Races in bold indicate pole position; results in italics indicate fastest lap)

Year	Entrant	Class	Chassis	Engine	1	2	3	4	5	6	Rank	Points
2008	James Watt Automotive	GT2	Porsche 997 GT3-RSR	Porsche M97/77 3.8 L Flat-6	CAT	MNZ	SPA	NUR	SIL; Ret		NC	0
2009	Advanced Engineering	GT2	Ferrari F430 GT2	Ferrari 4.0 L V8	CAT	SPA; 9	ALG	NUR; 10	SIL; 10		NC	0
2012	AF Corse	LMGTE Am	Ferrari 458 Italia GT2	Ferrari 4.5 L V8	LEC; 3	**DON**; 2	PET; Ret				2nd	34
2013	Ram Racing	LMGTE	Ferrari 458 Italia GT2	Ferrari 4.5 L V8	**SIL**; 2	**IMO**; 1	RBR; 1	HUN; 2	**LEC**; 1		1st	114
2014	AF Corse	LMGTE	Ferrari 458 Italia GT2	Ferrari 4.5 L V8	SIL; 1	IMO; 7	RBR; 1	LEC; 1	EST; 11		2nd	81.5
2015	AF Corse	LMGTE	Ferrari 458 Italia GT2	Ferrari 4.5 L V8	SIL; 3	IMO; 5	RBR; 2	LEC; 6	EST; 4		3rd	63
2016	AF Corse	LMGTE	Ferrari 458 Italia GT2	Ferrari 4.5 L V8	SIL; 4	IMO; 6	RBR; 8	LEC; 5	SPA; 3	EST; 3	6th	64
2017	Spirit of Race	LMGTE	Ferrari 488 GTE	Ferrari F154CB 3.9 L Turbo V8	SIL; 4	**MNZ**; Ret	RBR; 1	**LEC**; 1	SPA; 4	**ALG**; Ret	4th	77
2018	Spirit of Race	LMGTE	Ferrari 488 GTE	Ferrari F154CB 3.9 L Turbo V8	LEC; Ret	MNZ; 1	RBR; 2	SIL; 3	SPA; 2	ALG; 4	5th	79
2019	Spirit of Race	LMGTE	Ferrari 488 GTE	Ferrari F154CB 3.9 L Turbo V8	LEC; 5	MNZ; 7					5th	68
2019	Spirit of Race	LMGTE	Ferrari 488 GTE Evo	Ferrari F154CB 3.9 L Turbo V8			CAT; 3	SIL; 5	SPA; 3	ALG; 4	5th	68
2020	Spirit of Race	LMGTE	Ferrari 488 GTE Evo	Ferrari F154CB 3.9 L Turbo V8	LEC; Ret	SPA; 5	LEC; 1	MNZ; 4	ALG; 5		3rd	62
2021	Spirit of Race	LMGTE	Ferrari 488 GTE Evo	Ferrari F154CB 3.9 L Turbo V8	CAT; 3	RBR; 2	LEC; 2	MNZ	SPA; NC	ALG; 4	4th	63
2022	Spirit of Race	LMGTE	Ferrari 488 GTE Evo	Ferrari F154CB 3.9 L Turbo V8	LEC; 9	IMO; 3	MNZ; 8	CAT; 2	SPA	ALG	10th	39
2023	Spirit of Race	LMGTE	Ferrari 488 GTE Evo	Ferrari F154CB 3.9 L Turbo V8	BAR; 5	LEC; 5	ARA; 6	SPA; 7	POR; 7	ALG; 3	5th	55
2024	Spirit of Race	LMGT3	Ferrari 296 GT3	Ferrari F163CE 3.0 L Turbo V6	CAT; 5	LEC; 1	IMO; 8	SPA; Ret	MUG; Ret	ALG; 7	9th	45
2025	Spirit of Race	LMGT3	Ferrari 296 GT3	Ferrari F163CE 3.0 L Turbo V6	CAT; 4	LEC; 4	IMO; 3	SPA; 10	SIL; 8	ALG; 6	6th	52
2026	Spirit of Race	LMGT3	Ferrari 296 GT3 Evo	Ferrari F163CE 3.0 L Turbo V6	CAT; 6	LEC; 4	IMO; 9	SPA; 7	SIL; 5	ALG; 12	9th	38

=== Complete GT World Challenge results ===
==== GT World Challenge Europe Endurance Cup ====
(Races in bold indicate pole position) (Races in italics indicate fastest lap)

Year	Team	Car	Class	1	2	3	4	5	6	7	8	Pos.	Points
2011	AF Corse	Ferrari 458 Italia GT3	GT3 Pro-Am	MNZ; 10	NAV; Ret	SPA; 6H ?	SPA; 12H ?	SPA; 24H; 9	MAG; 11			15th	39
2011	AF Corse	Ferrari 458 Italia GT3	GT3 Pro							SIL; 7		34th	6
2012	MTECH	Ferrari 458 Italia GT3	Pro-Am	MNZ; 14	SIL; DNS	LEC; Ret	SPA; 6H ?	SPA; 12H ?	SPA; 24H; Ret	NÜR; 18	NAV	25th	15
2013	AF Corse	Ferrari 458 Italia GT3	Pro-Am	MNZ	SIL	LEC	SPA; 6H ?	SPA; 12H; 11	SPA; 24H; 5	NÜR		11th	34
2014	AF Corse	Ferrari 458 Italia GT3	Pro-Am	MNZ	SIL	LEC	SPA; 6H; 22	SPA; 12H; 20	SPA; 24H; 21	NÜR		27th	1
2015	AF Corse	Ferrari 458 Italia GT3	Pro-Am	MNZ; 4	SIL; 18	LEC; 10	SPA; 6H; 8	SPA; 12H; 10	SPA; 24H; 6	NÜR; 34		1st	88
2016	AF Corse	Ferrari 488 GT3	Pro-Am	MNZ; Ret	SIL	LEC; 8	SPA; 6H; 20	SPA; 12H; 30	SPA; 24H; 46	NÜR; 17		8th	43
2017	Black Falcon	Mercedes-AMG GT3	Pro-Am	MON	SIL	LEC; 20						22nd	21
2017	AF Corse	Ferrari 488 GT3	Pro-Am				SPA; 6H; 26	SPA; 12H; 29	SPA; 24H; 23	CAT		22nd	21
2018	AF Corse	Ferrari 488 GT3	Pro-Am	MON; 30	SIL; 26	LEC; 20	SPA; 6H; 35	SPA; 12H; 33	SPA; 24H; 21	CAT; 25		2nd	89
2021	AF Corse	Ferrari 488 GT3 Evo 2020	Pro-Am	MON	LEC; Ret	SPA; 6H; 30	SPA; 12H; 19	SPA; 24H; 15	NÜR; 34	CAT		4th	65

^{†} Did not finish, but was classified as he had completed more than 90% of the race distance.

=== Complete FIA World Endurance Championship results ===
(key) (Races in bold indicate pole position; races in italics indicate fastest lap)

Year	Entrant	Class	Chassis	Engine	1	2	3	4	5	6	7	8	9	Rank	Points
2012	AF Corse	LMGTE Am	Ferrari 458 Italia GT2	Ferrari F142 4.5L V8	SEB	SPA; 4	LMS; Ret							88th	1
2012	AF Corse-Waltrip	LMGTE Am	Ferrari 458 Italia GT2	Ferrari F142 4.5L V8				SIL; 1	SÃO	BHR	FUJ	SHA		88th	1
2013	AF Corse	LMGTE Am	Ferrari 458 Italia GT2	Ferrari F142 4.5L V8	SIL; 8	SPA; 8	LMS; 2	SÃO; Ret	COA; 7	FUJ; 7	SHA; 6	BHR; 3		9th	68
2014	Ram Racing	LMGTE Pro	Ferrari 458 Italia GT2	Ferrari F142 4.5L V8	SIL; 6	SPA	LMS; Ret	COA	FUJ	SHA	BHR	SÃO		NC	0
2015	AF Corse	LMGTE Am	Ferrari 458 Italia GT2	Ferrari 4.5 L V8	SIL	SPA; Ret	LMS; Ret	NÜR	COA	FUJ	SHA	BHR		NC	0
2016	AF Corse	LMGTE Am	Ferrari 458 Italia GT2	Ferrari F142 4.5L V8	SIL	SPA	LMS; 7	NÜR	MEX	COA	FUJ	SHA	BHR	15th	12
2017	Clearwater Racing	LMGTE Am	Ferrari 488 GTE	Ferrari F154CB 3.9 L Turbo V8	SIL; 1	SPA; 3	LMS; 2	NÜR; 4	MEX; 5	COA; 2	**FUJ**; 2	SHA; 4	BHR; 2	3rd	165
2018–19	Clearwater Racing	LMGTE Am	Ferrari 488 GTE	Ferrari F154CB 3.9 L Turbo V8	SPA; 3	LMS; 4	SIL; 5	FUJ; 6	SHA; 7	SEB; DNS	SPA; 3	LMS; 3		5th	95

=== Complete 24 Hours of Le Mans results ===
Year	Team	Co-Drivers	Car	Class	Laps	Pos.	Class Pos.
2012	(Italy) AF Corse	(Italy) Niki Cadei (Italy) Piergiuseppe Perazzini	Ferrari 458 Italia GT2	GTE Am	70	DNF	DNF
2013	(Italy) AF Corse	(Italy) Marco Cioci (South Africa) Jack Gerber	Ferrari 458 Italia GT2	GTE Am	305	27th	**3rd**
2014	(United Kingdom) Ram Racing	(Portugal) Álvaro Parente (Italy) Federico Leo	Ferrari 458 Italia GT2	GTE Pro	140	DNF	DNF
2015	(Italy) AF Corse	(United Kingdom) Duncan Cameron (United Kingdom) Alex Mortimer	Ferrari 458 Italia GT2	GTE Am	241	DNF	DNF
2016	(Italy) AF Corse	(United Kingdom) Duncan Cameron (United Kingdom) Aaron Scott	Ferrari 458 Italia GT2	GTE Am	289	43rd	11th
2017	(Singapore) Clearwater Racing	(Malaysia) Weng Sun Mok (Japan) Keita Sawa	Ferrari 488 GTE	GTE Am	330	31st	6th
2018	(Singapore) Clearwater Racing	(Malaysia) Weng Sun Mok (Japan) Keita Sawa	Ferrari 488 GTE	GTE Am	332	35th	8th
2019	(Singapore) Clearwater Racing	(Italy) Matteo Cressoni (Argentina) Luís Pérez Companc	Ferrari 488 GTE	GTE Am	331	37th	7th
2020	(Switzerland) Spirit of Race	(United Kingdom) Duncan Cameron (United Kingdom) Aaron Scott	Ferrari 488 GTE Evo	GTE Am	78	DNF	DNF
2021	(Switzerland) Spirit of Race	(United Kingdom) Duncan Cameron (South Africa) David Perel	Ferrari 488 GTE Evo	GTE Am	109	DNF	DNF
2022	(Switzerland) Spirit of Race	(United Kingdom) Duncan Cameron (South Africa) David Perel	Ferrari 488 GTE Evo	GTE Am	339	43rd	10th

=== Complete IMSA SportsCar Championship results ===
(key) (Races in bold indicate pole position; races in italics indicate fastest lap)

Year	Entrant	Class	Make	Engine	1	2	3	4	5	6	7	8	9	10	11	Rank	Points
2014	Spirit of Race	GTD	Ferrari 458 Italia GT3	Ferrari 4.5 L V8	DAY; 15	SEB; 13	LAG	DET	WGL; 18†	MOS	IMS	ELK	VIR	COA	PET; 6	37th	63
2015	AF Corse	GTD	Ferrari 458 Italia GT3	Ferrari 4.5 L V8	DAY; 4	SEB	LAG	DET	WGL	LIM	ELK	VIR	COA	PET		35th	29
2018	Risi Competizione	GTD	Ferrari 488 GT3	Ferrari F154CB 3.9 L Turbo V8	DAY; 17	SEB	LBH	MDO	DET	WGL	MOS	LIM	ELK	VIR	LGA	62nd	14

=== Complete Asian Le Mans Series results ===
(key) (Races in bold indicate pole position) (Races in italics indicate fastest lap)

Year	Team	Class	Car	Engine	1	2	3	4	Pos.	Points
2014	Clearwater Racing	GT	Ferrari 458 Italia GT3	Ferrari F142 4.5 L V8	INJ	FUJ	SHA; 1	SEP	7th	25
2016–17	Clearwater Racing	GT	Ferrari 488 GT3	Ferrari F154CB 3.9 L Turbo V8	ZHU; 2	FUJ; 7	BUR; 6	SEP; 4	5th	44

=== Complete Le Mans Cup results ===
(key) (Races in bold indicate pole position; results in italics indicate fastest lap)

Year	Entrant	Class	Chassis	1	2	3	4	5	6	7	Rank	Points
2020	Iron Lynx	GT3	Ferrari 488 GT3	LEC1	SPA	LEC2; 5	LMS; 1	LMS; 2	MNZ	ALG	14th	10
