= 2014 Bathurst 12 Hour =

Car race

2014 Liqui Moly Bathurst 12 Hour

Seasons
- ← 2013 2015 →

Layout of the Mount Panorama Circuit

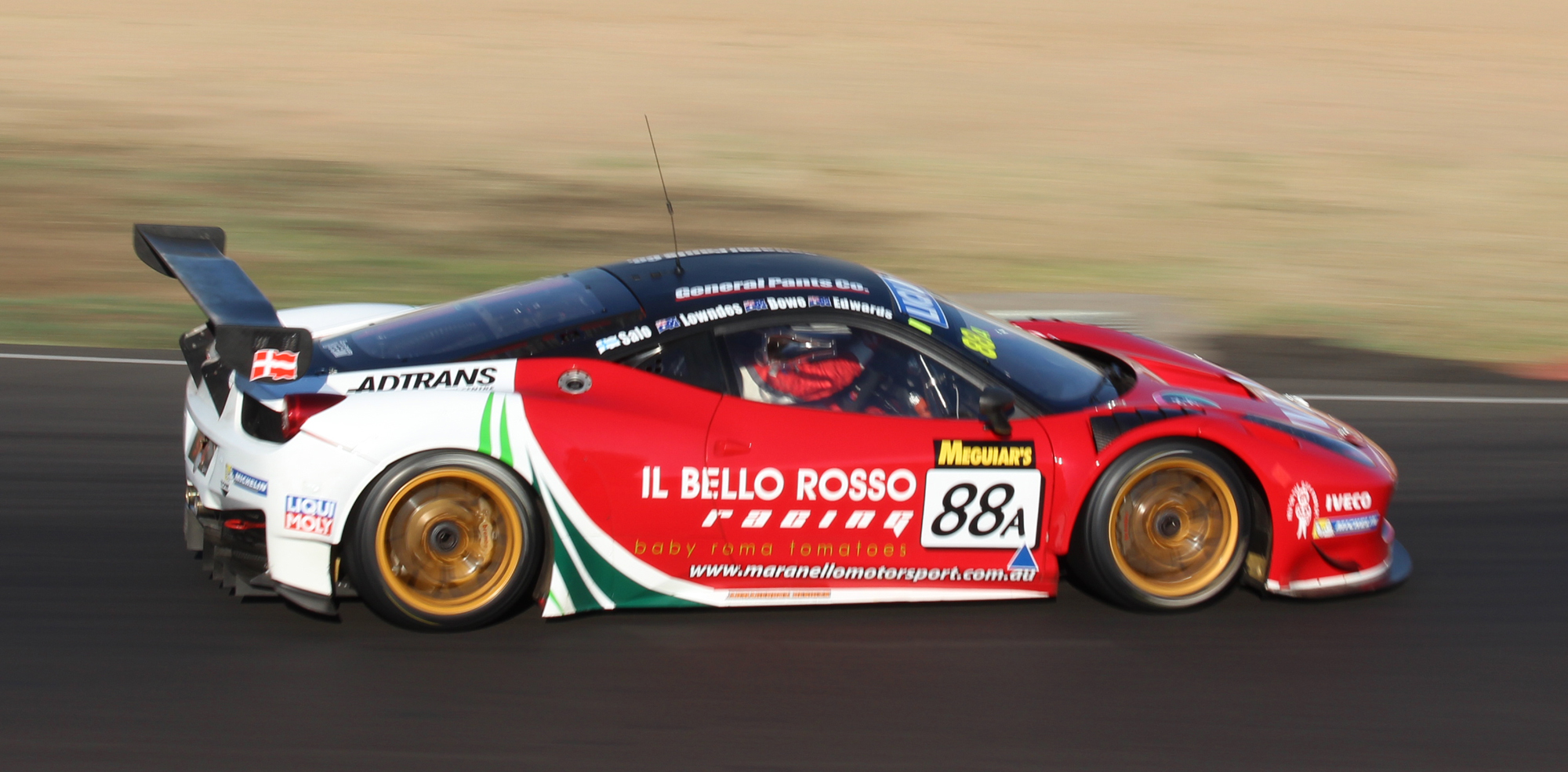
The race winning Ferrari 458 Italia GT3 of John Bowe, Peter Edwards, Craig Lowndes and Mika Salo.

The 2014 Liqui Moly Bathurst 12 Hour was an endurance race for a variety of GT and touring car classes, including: GT3 cars, GT4 cars and Group 3E Series Production Cars. The event, which was staged at the Mount Panorama Circuit, near Bathurst, in New South Wales, Australia on 9 February 2014, was the twelfth running of the Bathurst 12 Hour.

44 cars were entered for the race, though four entries were withdrawn due to crashes in practice and qualifying. John Bowe, Peter Edwards, Craig Lowndes and Mika Salo won the race for Maranello Motorsport, driving a Ferrari 458 GT3, after Lowndes won a close battle with German driver Maximilian Buhk late in the race. Buhk finished second for HTP Motorsport along with Thomas Jäger and Harold Primat, just four tenths of a second behind Lowndes. Greg Crick, Will Davison and Jack Le Brocq finished third for Erebus Motorsport, with Davison holding off Shane van Gisbergen in the closing laps despite having a damaged car. The Nissan GT-R Nismo GT3 had shown early pace but was involved in an early crash at the top of the circuit and did not finish.

Three Fiat Abarth 500s had been invited and were competing in their own class, with their lap times being much slower than the GT3 cars. A late safety car saw the three Fiats mixed in with the leading GT3 cars at the front of the safety car queue. The three drivers voluntarily drove through the pit lane as the race restarted, giving the leading GT3 cars a clearer track as they battled for position in the closing laps.

The 2014 race was the fastest ever contested to that point, setting a distance record of 296 laps (1839 kilometres), which was not broken until 2016.

== Class structure ==
Cars competed in the following six classes.

- Class A – GT3 Outright
- Class B – GT3 (Older Specification)/GT3 Cup Cars
- Class C – GT4
- Class D – Invitational (over 3000cc)
- Class F – Invitational (up to 3000cc)
- Class I – Invitational (non-production)

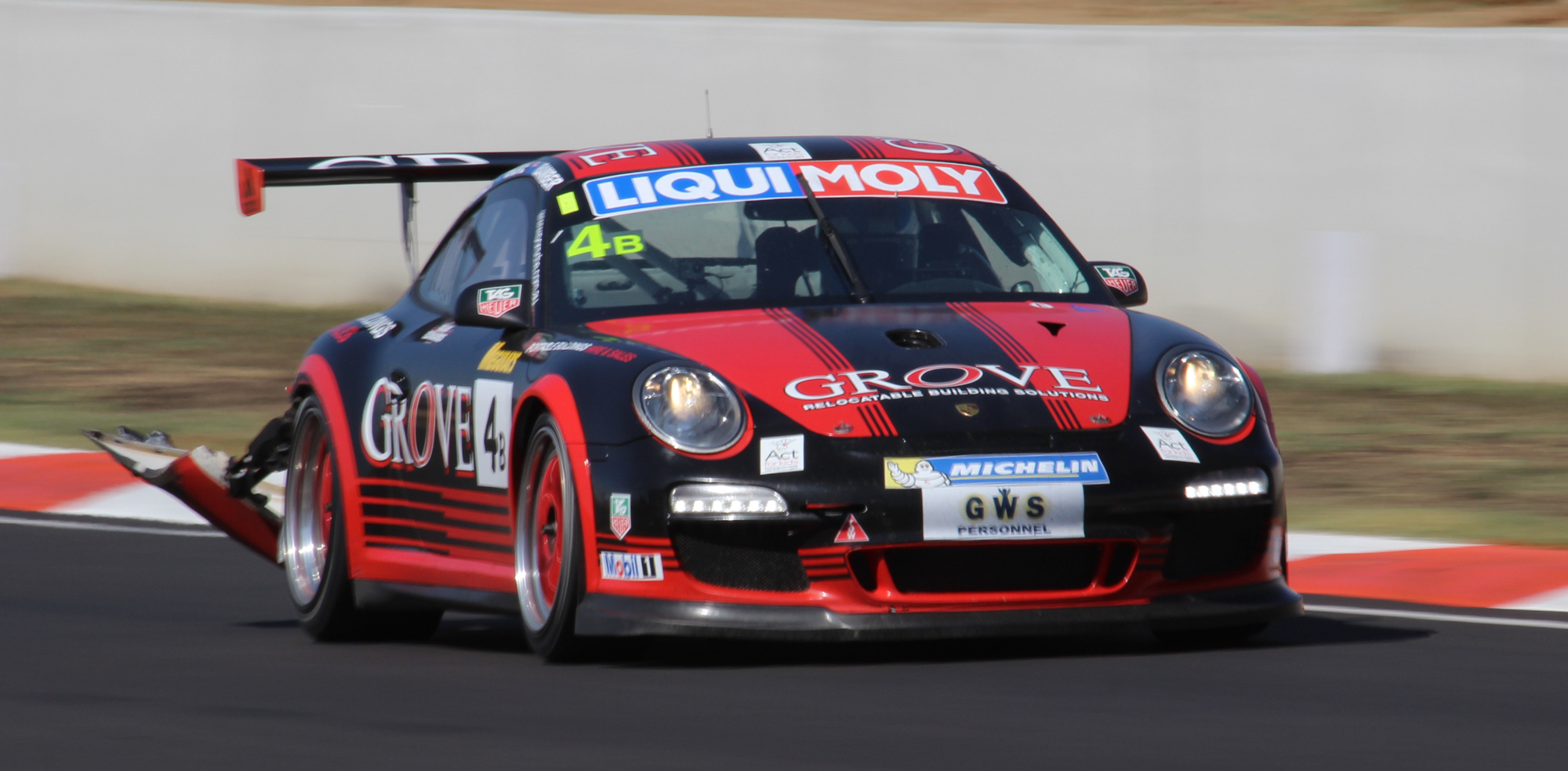
The Class B-winning Porsche 997 GT3 Cup of Earl Bamber, Ben Barker and Stephen Grove.

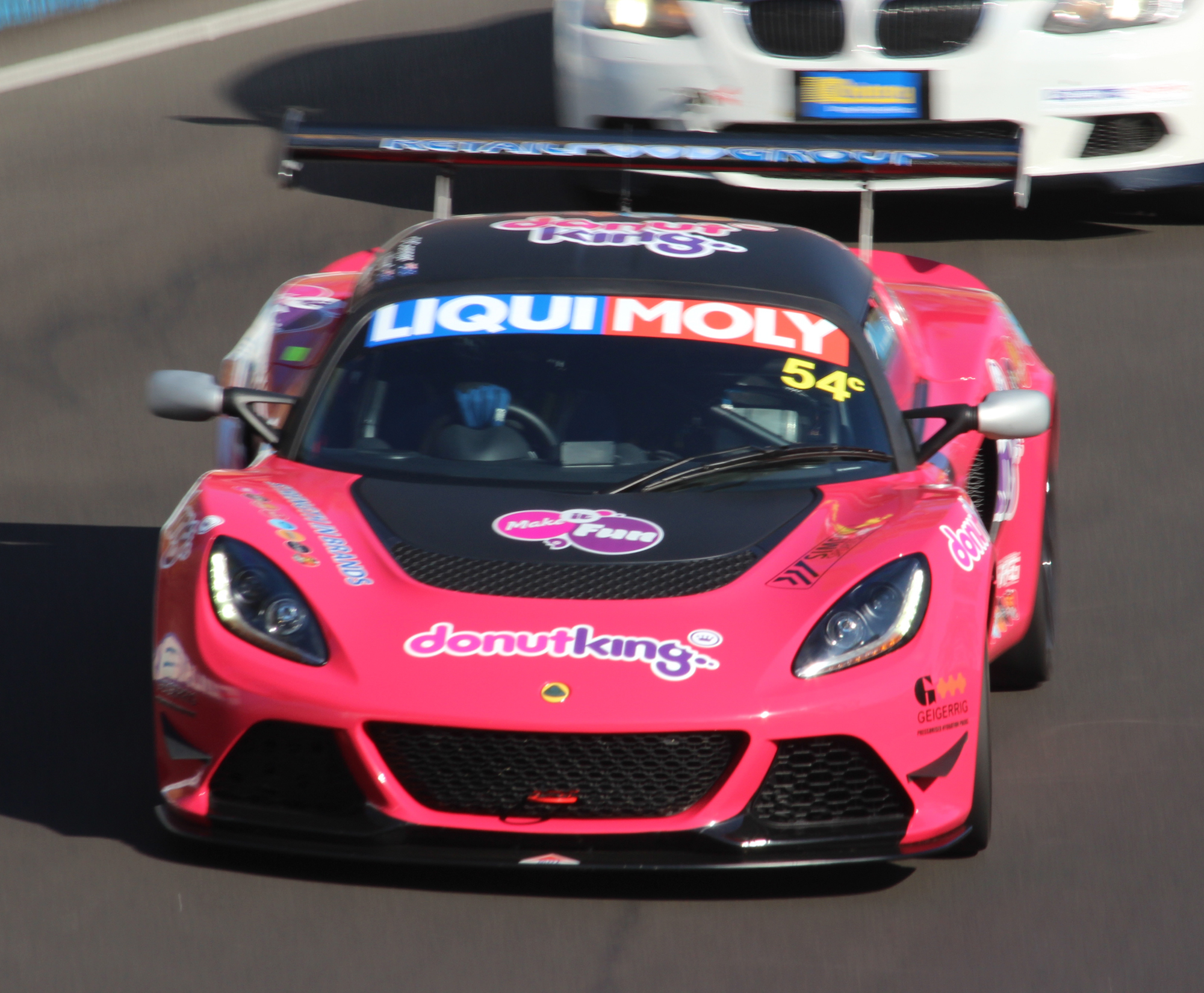
The Class C-winning Lotus Exige Cup R of Tony Alford, Peter Leemhuis and Mark O'Connor.

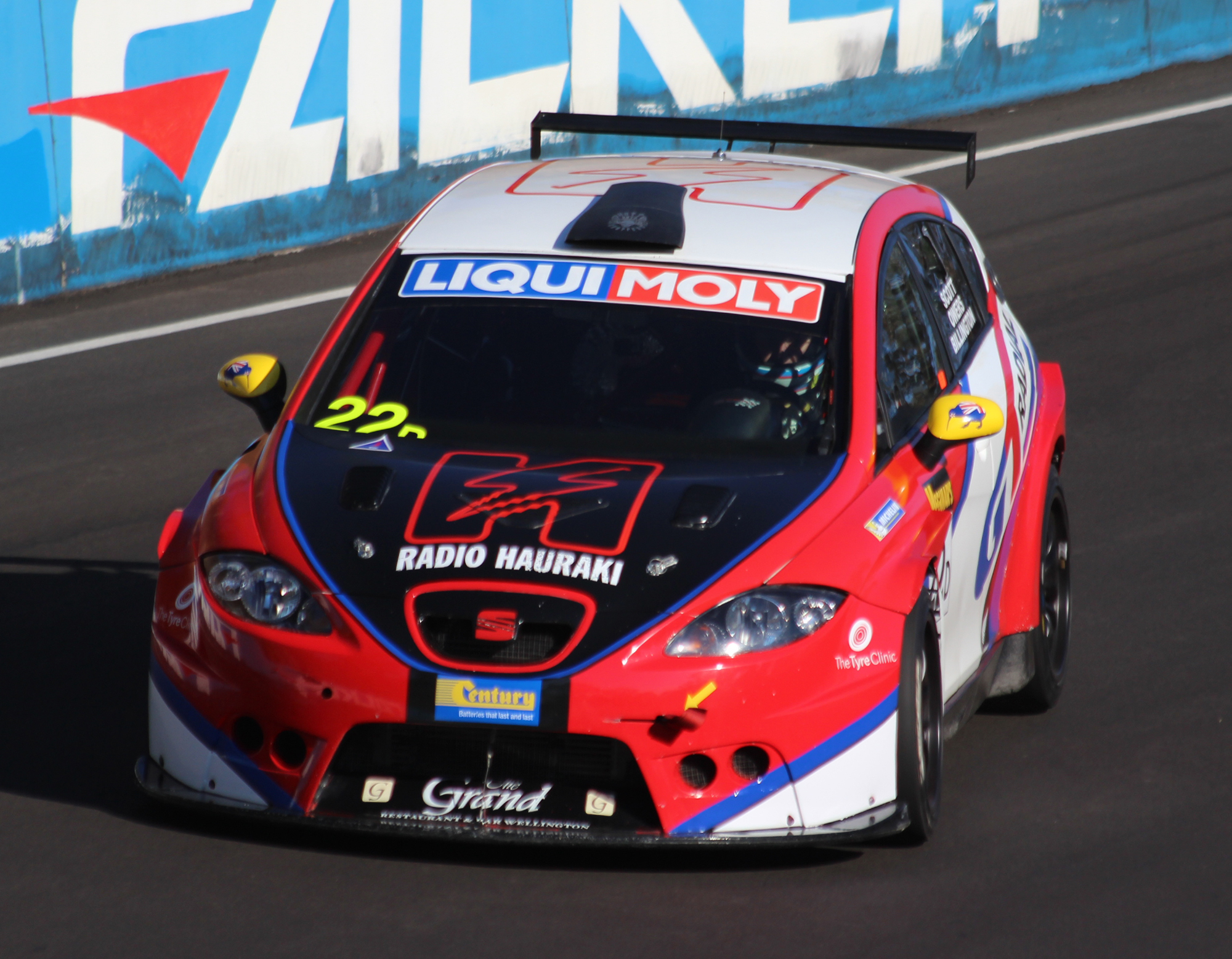
The Class D-winning SEAT León Supercopa of Richard Billington, Stuart Owers and Lewis Scott.

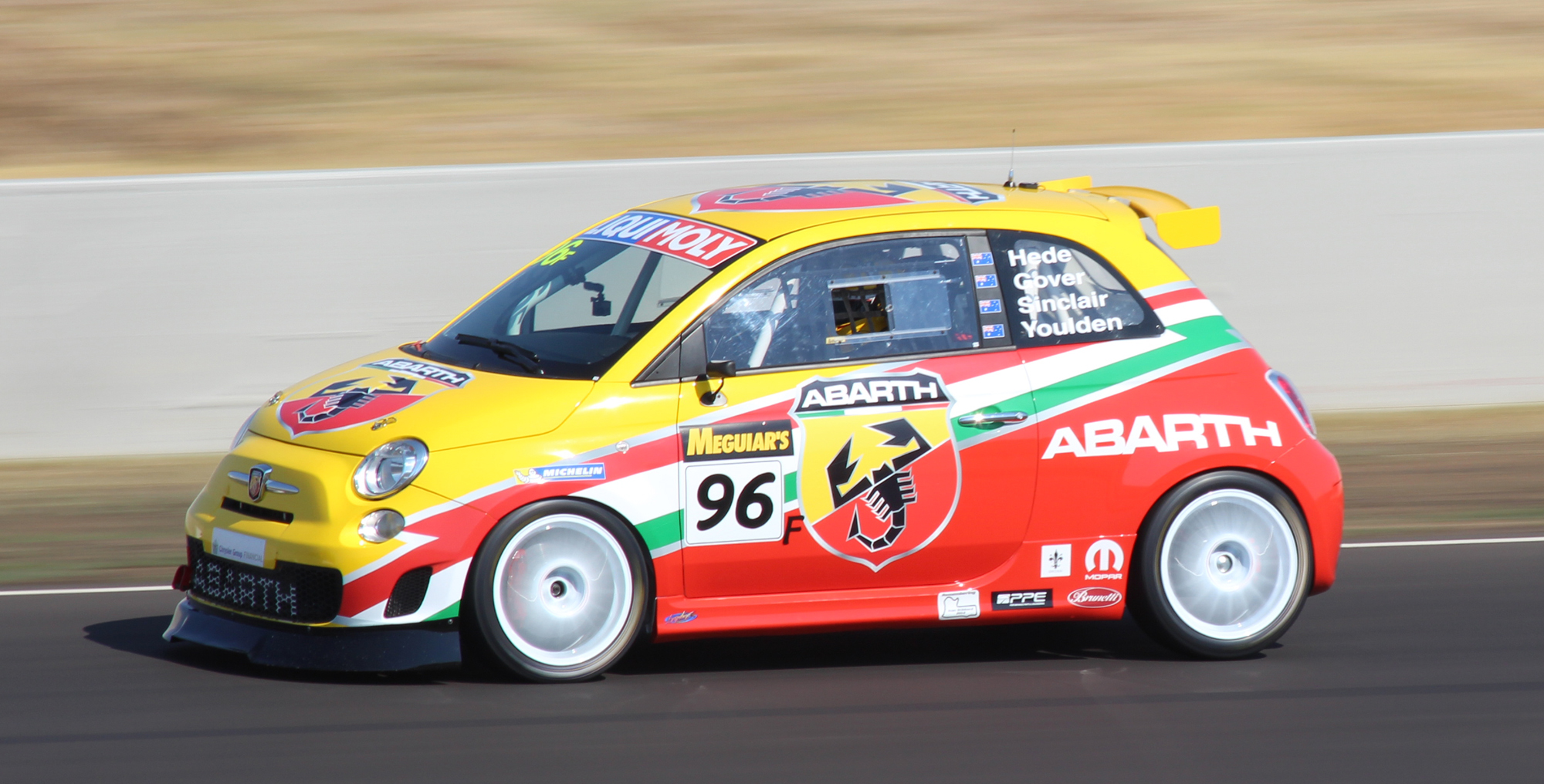
The Class F-winning Fiat Abarth 500 of Paul Gover, Gregory Hede, Mike Sinclair and Luke Youlden.

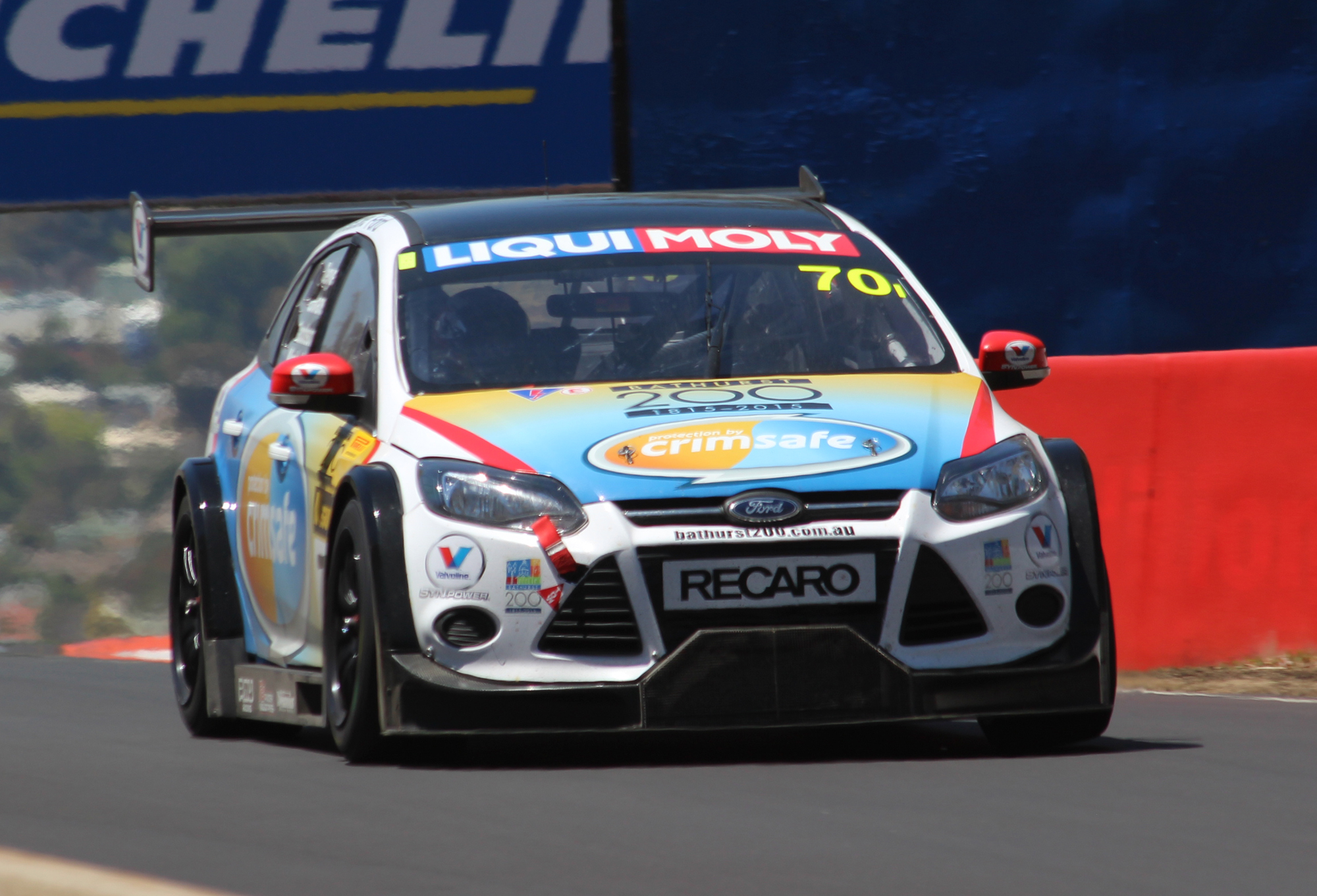
The Class I-winning MARC Focus GTC of Grant Denyer, Adam Gowans, Garry Jacobson and Andrew Miedecke.

== Official results ==
Pos.	Class	No.	Team / Entrant	Drivers	Car	Laps	Time/Retired
Pos.	Class	No.	Team / Entrant	Drivers	Engine	Laps	Time/Retired
1	**A**	**88**	**(Australia) Maranello Motorsport**	**(Australia) John Bowe (Australia) Casey Stoner (Australia) Craig Lowndes (Finland) Mika Salo**	**Ferrari 458 Italia GT3**	**296**	**12:00:29.5750**
1	**A**	**88**	**(Australia) Maranello Motorsport**	**(Australia) John Bowe (Australia) Casey Stoner (Australia) Craig Lowndes (Finland) Mika Salo**	**4.5 L Ferrari F142 V8**	**296**	**12:00:29.5750**
2	A	84	(Germany) HTP Motorsport	(Germany) Maximilian Buhk (Germany) Thomas Jäger (Switzerland) Harold Primat	Mercedes-Benz SLS AMG	296	+0.4138
2	A	84	(Germany) HTP Motorsport	(Germany) Maximilian Buhk (Germany) Thomas Jäger (Switzerland) Harold Primat	6.2 L Mercedes-Benz M159 V8	296	+0.4138
3	A	63	(Australia) Erebus Motorsport	(Australia) Greg Crick (Australia) Will Davison (Australia) Jack Le Brocq	Mercedes-Benz SLS AMG	296	+2.4025
3	A	63	(Australia) Erebus Motorsport	(Australia) Greg Crick (Australia) Will Davison (Australia) Jack Le Brocq	6.2 L Mercedes-Benz M159 V8	296	+2.4025
4	A	37	(Australia) VIP Holdings (Aust) Pty Ltd	(United Kingdom) Andrew Kirkaldy (Australia) Klark Quinn (United Kingdom) Tony Quinn (New Zealand) Shane van Gisbergen	McLaren MP4-12C GT3	296	+3.0541
4	A	37	(Australia) VIP Holdings (Aust) Pty Ltd	(United Kingdom) Andrew Kirkaldy (Australia) Klark Quinn (United Kingdom) Tony Quinn (New Zealand) Shane van Gisbergen	3.8 L McLaren M838T twin-turbo V8	296	+3.0541
5	A	3	(Germany) Phoenix Racing	(Switzerland) Rahel Frey (Germany) René Rast (Belgium) Laurens Vanthoor	Audi R8 LMS Ultra	296	+36.9483
5	A	3	(Germany) Phoenix Racing	(Switzerland) Rahel Frey (Germany) René Rast (Belgium) Laurens Vanthoor	5.2 L FSI 2×DOHC Audi V10	296	+36.9483
6	A	25	(United States) United Autosports	(United States) Eric Lux (United States) Mark Patterson (Germany) Markus Winkelhock	Audi R8 LMS Ultra	294	+2 laps
6	A	25	(United States) United Autosports	(United States) Eric Lux (United States) Mark Patterson (Germany) Markus Winkelhock	5.2 L FSI 2×DOHC Audi V10	294	+2 laps
7	A	1	(Australia) Erebus Motorsport	(Germany) Nico Bastian (Germany) Maro Engel (Germany) Bernd Schneider	Mercedes-Benz SLS AMG	291	+5 laps
7	A	1	(Australia) Erebus Motorsport	(Germany) Nico Bastian (Germany) Maro Engel (Germany) Bernd Schneider	6.2 L Mercedes-Benz M159 V8	291	+5 laps
8	**B**	**4**	**(Australia) Grove Motorsport**	**(New Zealand) Earl Bamber (United Kingdom) Ben Barker (Australia) Stephen Grove**	**Porsche 997 GT3 Cup**	**286**	**+10 laps**
8	**B**	**4**	**(Australia) Grove Motorsport**	**(New Zealand) Earl Bamber (United Kingdom) Ben Barker (Australia) Stephen Grove**	**3.6 L Porsche H6**	**286**	**+10 laps**
9	B	12	(United States) Competition Motorsports	(Australia) David Calvert-Jones (Australia) Alex Davison (United States) Patrick Long	Porsche 997 GT3 Cup	284	+12 laps
9	B	12	(United States) Competition Motorsports	(Australia) David Calvert-Jones (Australia) Alex Davison (United States) Patrick Long	3.6 L Porsche H6	284	+12 laps
10	A	9	(Australia) Hallmarc Racing	(Australia) Marc Cini (Australia) Mark Eddy (Germany) Christopher Mies	Audi R8 LMS Ultra	278	+18 laps
10	A	9	(Australia) Hallmarc Racing	(Australia) Marc Cini (Australia) Mark Eddy (Germany) Christopher Mies	5.2 L FSI 2×DOHC Audi V10	278	+18 laps
11	B	19	(Australia) Nexus Racing	(Australia) Damien Flack (Australia) Rob Smith (Australia) Shane Smollen	Porsche 997 GT3 Cup	277	+19 laps
11	B	19	(Australia) Nexus Racing	(Australia) Damien Flack (Australia) Rob Smith (Australia) Shane Smollen	3.6 L Porsche H6	277	+19 laps
12	B	69	(Australia) Supabarn Supermarkets Racing	(Australia) James Koundouris (Australia) Theo Koundouris (Australia) Steve Owen (Australia) Max Twigg	Porsche 997 GT3 Cup S	275	+21 laps
12	B	69	(Australia) Supabarn Supermarkets Racing	(Australia) James Koundouris (Australia) Theo Koundouris (Australia) Steve Owen (Australia) Max Twigg	3.6 L Porsche H6	275	+21 laps
13	B	99	(Australia) Racing Incident	(Australia) Eric Bana (Australia) Peter Hill (Australia) Simon Middleton	Lamborghini Gallardo LP520	275	+21 laps
13	B	99	(Australia) Racing Incident	(Australia) Eric Bana (Australia) Peter Hill (Australia) Simon Middleton	5.2 L Lamborghini V10	275	+21 laps
14	B	71	(Australia) Equity-One Racing	(Australia) Dean Fiore (Australia) Dean Grant (Australia) Dean Koutsoumidis (Australia) Michael Loccisano	Audi R8 LMS	271	+25 laps
14	B	71	(Australia) Equity-One Racing	(Australia) Dean Fiore (Australia) Dean Grant (Australia) Dean Koutsoumidis (Australia) Michael Loccisano	5.2 L FSI 2×DOHC Audi V10	271	+25 laps
15	**I**	**70**	**MARC Cars Australia**	**(Australia) Grant Denyer (Australia) Adam Gowans (Australia) Garry Jacobson (Australia) Andrew Miedecke**	**MARC Focus GTC**	**268**	**+28 laps**
15	**I**	**70**	**MARC Cars Australia**	**(Australia) Grant Denyer (Australia) Adam Gowans (Australia) Garry Jacobson (Australia) Andrew Miedecke**	**5.0 L Ford Coyote V8**	**268**	**+28 laps**
16	**D**	**22**	**(New Zealand) Richard Billington Racing**	**(New Zealand) Richard Billington (New Zealand) Stuart Owers (New Zealand) Lewis Scott**	**SEAT León Supercopa**	**247**	**+49 laps**
16	**D**	**22**	**(New Zealand) Richard Billington Racing**	**(New Zealand) Richard Billington (New Zealand) Stuart Owers (New Zealand) Lewis Scott**	**2.0 L SEAT I4**	**247**	**+49 laps**
17	I	50	MARC Cars Australia	(Australia) Jake Camilleri (Papua New Guinea) Keith Kassulke (New Zealand) Chris Pither	MARC Focus GTC	246	+50 laps
17	I	50	MARC Cars Australia	(Australia) Jake Camilleri (Papua New Guinea) Keith Kassulke (New Zealand) Chris Pither	5.0 L Ford Coyote V8	246	+50 laps
18	**F**	**96**	**(Australia) Fiat Abarth Motorsport**	**(Australia) Paul Gover (Australia) Gregory Hede (Australia) Mike Sinclair (Australia) Luke Youlden**	**Fiat Abarth 500**	**243**	**+53 laps**
18	**F**	**96**	**(Australia) Fiat Abarth Motorsport**	**(Australia) Paul Gover (Australia) Gregory Hede (Australia) Mike Sinclair (Australia) Luke Youlden**	**1.4 L Fire Turbojet I4**	**243**	**+53 laps**
19	I	60	MARC Cars Australia	(Australia) Michael Benton (Australia) Hadrian Morrall (Australia) Dylan Thomas	MARC Focus GTC	242	+54 laps
19	I	60	MARC Cars Australia	(Australia) Michael Benton (Australia) Hadrian Morrall (Australia) Dylan Thomas	5.0 L Ford Coyote V8	242	+54 laps
20	D	28	(Australia) GWS Personnel Motorsport	(Australia) Kean Booker (Australia) Matt Chahda (Australia) Peter O’Donnell (Australia) Allan Shephard	BMW 335i	238	+58 laps
20	D	28	(Australia) GWS Personnel Motorsport	(Australia) Kean Booker (Australia) Matt Chahda (Australia) Peter O’Donnell (Australia) Allan Shephard	3.0 L BMW N54 twin-turbo I6	238	+58 laps
21	B	51	(Australia) AMAC Motorsport	(Australia) Andrew Macpherson (Australia) Ben Porter (Australia) Garth Walden	Porsche 997 GT3 Cup S	237	+59 laps
21	B	51	(Australia) AMAC Motorsport	(Australia) Andrew Macpherson (Australia) Ben Porter (Australia) Garth Walden	3.6 L Porsche H6	237	+59 laps
22	F	95	(Australia) Fiat Abarth Motorsport	(Australia) Clyde Campbell (Australia) Joshua Dowling (Australia) Toby Hagon (Australia) Paul Stokell	Fiat Abarth 500	236	+60 laps
22	F	95	(Australia) Fiat Abarth Motorsport	(Australia) Clyde Campbell (Australia) Joshua Dowling (Australia) Toby Hagon (Australia) Paul Stokell	1.4 L Fire Turbojet I4	236	+60 laps
23	D	66	(New Zealand) Motorsport Services	(New Zealand) Michael Driver (Australia) Guy Stewart (Australia) Danny Stutterd	SEAT León Supercopa	212	+84 laps
23	D	66	(New Zealand) Motorsport Services	(New Zealand) Michael Driver (Australia) Guy Stewart (Australia) Danny Stutterd	2.0 L SEAT I4	212	+84 laps
24	D	7	(Australia) Maximum Motorsport	(Australia) Dean Herridge (Australia) Angus Kennard (Australia) John O'Dowd	Subaru Impreza WRX STi	208	+88 laps
24	D	7	(Australia) Maximum Motorsport	(Australia) Dean Herridge (Australia) Angus Kennard (Australia) John O'Dowd	2.5 L Subaru H4	208	+88 laps
25	**C**	**54**	**(Australia) Donut King Racing**	**(Australia) Tony Alford (Australia) Peter Leemhuis (Australia) Mark O'Connor**	**Lotus Exige Cup R**	**204**	**+92 laps**
25	**C**	**54**	**(Australia) Donut King Racing**	**(Australia) Tony Alford (Australia) Peter Leemhuis (Australia) Mark O'Connor**	**3.5 L Toyota 2GR-FE supercharged V6**	**204**	**+92 laps**
26	B	35	(Australia) Team BRM	(Australia) Andrew Fisher (Australia) Indiran Padayachee (Australia) Ric Shaw (Australia) Aaron Zerefos	Porsche 997 GT3 Cup	183	+113 laps
26	B	35	(Australia) Team BRM	(Australia) Andrew Fisher (Australia) Indiran Padayachee (Australia) Ric Shaw (Australia) Aaron Zerefos	3.6 L Porsche H6	183	+113 laps
27	D	97	(New Zealand) Mortimer Motorsports	(United Kingdom) Frank Lyons (United Kingdom) Michael Lyons (New Zealand) Andre Mortimer (New Zealand) Warwick Mortimer	BMW M3 GT4	126	+170 laps
27	D	97	(New Zealand) Mortimer Motorsports	(United Kingdom) Frank Lyons (United Kingdom) Michael Lyons (New Zealand) Andre Mortimer (New Zealand) Warwick Mortimer	4.0 L BMW S65 V8	126	+170 laps
28	F	59	(Australia) Fiat Abarth Motorsport	(Australia) Matt Campbell (Australia) Matt Cherry (Australia) Luke Ellery	Fiat Abarth 500	10	+286 laps
28	F	59	(Australia) Fiat Abarth Motorsport	(Australia) Matt Campbell (Australia) Matt Cherry (Australia) Luke Ellery	1.4 L Fire Turbojet I4	10	+286 laps
DNF	D	65	(Australia) Daytona Sports Cars	(Australia) Jamie Augustine (Australia) Paul Freestone (Australia) Benjamin Schoots	Daytona Sportscar	236	Driveline
DNF	D	65	(Australia) Daytona Sports Cars	(Australia) Jamie Augustine (Australia) Paul Freestone (Australia) Benjamin Schoots	6.0 L GM LS1 V8	236	Driveline
DNF	B	67	(New Zealand) Motorsport Services	(New Zealand) Jeff Lowrey (New Zealand) Tony Richards (Australia) Jonathon Venter	Porsche 997 GT3 Cup	208	Crash
DNF	B	67	(New Zealand) Motorsport Services	(New Zealand) Jeff Lowrey (New Zealand) Tony Richards (Australia) Jonathon Venter	3.6 L Porsche H6	208	Crash
DNF	B	45	(Australia) Team BRM	(Australia) Barton Mawer (Australia) Richard Muscat (Australia) Duvashen Padayachee	Porsche 997 GT3 Cup	190	Engine
DNF	B	45	(Australia) Team BRM	(Australia) Barton Mawer (Australia) Richard Muscat (Australia) Duvashen Padayachee	3.6 L Porsche H6	190	Engine
DNF	C	17	(Australia) Griffith Corporation P/L	(New Zealand) Daniel Gaunt (Australia) Mark Griffith (Australia) Karl Reindler	Ginetta G50 GT4	181	Engine
DNF	C	17	(Australia) Griffith Corporation P/L	(New Zealand) Daniel Gaunt (Australia) Mark Griffith (Australia) Karl Reindler	3.5 L Ford Cyclone V6	181	Engine
DNF	B	6	(Australia) SAFE-T-STOP	(Australia) Garth Duffy (Australia) Richard Gartner (Australia) Michael Hector (Australia) Stuart Kostera	Porsche 997 GT3 Cup	168	Overheating
DNF	B	6	(Australia) SAFE-T-STOP	(Australia) Garth Duffy (Australia) Richard Gartner (Australia) Michael Hector (Australia) Stuart Kostera	3.6 L Porsche H6	168	Overheating
DNF	B	14	(United States) Rotek Racing	(United Kingdom) Oliver Gavin (United States) Kevin Gleason (United Kingdom) Rob Huff (United Kingdom) Richard Meins	Audi R8 LMS	91	Engine
DNF	B	14	(United States) Rotek Racing	(United Kingdom) Oliver Gavin (United States) Kevin Gleason (United Kingdom) Rob Huff (United Kingdom) Richard Meins	5.2 L FSI 2×DOHC Audi V10	91	Engine
DNF	A	48	(Australia) M Motorsport	(Australia) Ross Lilley (Australia) Justin McMillan (New Zealand) Steven Richards (Australia) Dale Wood	Lamborghini Gallardo LP560-4	78	Crash
DNF	A	48	(Australia) M Motorsport	(Australia) Ross Lilley (Australia) Justin McMillan (New Zealand) Steven Richards (Australia) Dale Wood	5.2 L Lamborghini V10	78	Crash
DNF	C	55	(United Kingdom) Motionsport	(United Kingdom) Ben Gower (United Kingdom) Gordon Shedden (United Kingdom) Pete Storey	Lotus Exige S	68	Engine
DNF	C	55	(United Kingdom) Motionsport	(United Kingdom) Ben Gower (United Kingdom) Gordon Shedden (United Kingdom) Pete Storey	3.5 L Toyota 2GR-FE supercharged V6	68	Engine
DNF	A	32	(Japan) NISMO Athlete Global Team	(United Kingdom) Alex Buncombe (Japan) Katsumasa Chiyo (Australia) Rick Kelly (Belgium) Wolfgang Reip	Nissan GT-R Nismo GT3	58	Crash
DNF	A	32	(Japan) NISMO Athlete Global Team	(United Kingdom) Alex Buncombe (Japan) Katsumasa Chiyo (Australia) Rick Kelly (Belgium) Wolfgang Reip	3.8 L Nissan VR38DETT twin-turbo V6	58	Crash
DNF	A	33	(Singapore) Clearwater Racing	(New Zealand) Craig Baird (Republic of Ireland) Matt Griffin (Japan) Hiroshi Hamaguachi (Singapore) Weng Sun Mok	Ferrari 458 Italia GT3	57	Crash
DNF	A	33	(Singapore) Clearwater Racing	(New Zealand) Craig Baird (Republic of Ireland) Matt Griffin (Japan) Hiroshi Hamaguachi (Singapore) Weng Sun Mok	4.5 L Ferrari F142 V8	57	Crash
DNF	A	23	(Australia) Lago Racing	(Netherlands) Peter Kox (Australia) Roger Lago (Australia) David Russell	Lamborghini Gallardo LP560	5	Hit Kangaroo
DNF	A	23	(Australia) Lago Racing	(Netherlands) Peter Kox (Australia) Roger Lago (Australia) David Russell	5.2 L Lamborghini V10	5	Hit Kangaroo
DNF	D	42	(Australia) Motorline BMW	(Australia) Angus Chapel (Australia) Jason Clements (Australia) Anthony Gilbertson	BMW M3 GTR	1	Throttle
DNF	D	42	(Australia) Motorline BMW	(Australia) Angus Chapel (Australia) Jason Clements (Australia) Anthony Gilbertson	4.0 L BMW P60B40 V8	1	Throttle
DNS	B	68	(New Zealand) Motorsport Services	(Hong Kong) Daniel Bilski (New Zealand) David Glasson (New Zealand) Marcus Mahy	Porsche 997 GT3 Cup		Crash in Practice 3
DNS	B	68	(New Zealand) Motorsport Services	(Hong Kong) Daniel Bilski (New Zealand) David Glasson (New Zealand) Marcus Mahy	3.6 L Porsche H6		Crash in Practice 3
DNS	A	5	(Australia) Rod Salmon Racing	(Australia) Jason Bright (Australia) Warren Luff (Australia) Rod Salmon (Australia) Liam Talbot	Audi R8 LMS Ultra		Crash in Qualifying
DNS	A	5	(Australia) Rod Salmon Racing	(Australia) Jason Bright (Australia) Warren Luff (Australia) Rod Salmon (Australia) Liam Talbot	5.2 L FSI 2×DOHC Audi V10		Crash in Qualifying
DNS	A	77	(Italy) AF Corse	(Italy) Marco Cioci (Italy) Michele Rugolo (Australia) Steve Wyatt	Ferrari 458 Italia GT3		Crash in Qualifying
DNS	A	77	(Italy) AF Corse	(Italy) Marco Cioci (Italy) Michele Rugolo (Australia) Steve Wyatt	4.5 L Ferrari F142 V8		Crash in Qualifying
DNS	A	49	(Australia) Vicious Rumour Racing	(Australia) Dean Canto (Australia) Tony D'Alberto (Australia) Tony Defelice (Australia) Renato Loberto	Ferrari 458 Italia GT3		Crash in Practice 1
DNS	A	49	(Australia) Vicious Rumour Racing	(Australia) Dean Canto (Australia) Tony D'Alberto (Australia) Tony Defelice (Australia) Renato Loberto	4.5 L Ferrari F142 V8		Crash in Practice 1
Sources:

- Note: Class winners are shown in bold.
- Race time of winning car: 12:00:29.5750
- Fastest race lap: 2:03.8506 – Shane van Gisbergen
