= Richard Antinucci =

American race car driver

- Nationality: (United States) American
- Born: Richard Mark Antinucci; January 26, 1981 (age 45) Rome, Italy
- Relatives: Eddie Cheever (uncle)

Firestone Indy Lights Series
- Categorisation: FIA Silver (until 2018); FIA Gold (2019–)
- Years active: 2007-2008
- Teams: Cheever Racing; Sam Schmidt Motorsports
- Starts: 25
- Wins: 4
- Poles: 2
- Best finish: 2nd in 2008

Previous series
- 2005-06 2005 2004 2003: Formula 3 Euro Series; Formula Renault 3.5 Series; All-Japan Formula Three; British Formula 3

Richard Mark Antinucci (born January 26, 1981) is an Italian-American race car driver.

== Career ==
Born to an American father and an Italian mother, Antinucci competed in the British Formula Ford series in 1998 for Haywood Racing, moving to the British Formula Renault Winter Series in 1999 and to Formula Renault 2000 Eurocup in 2000, where he stayed for one season (although he drove two fill-in races in 2001).

In a bad-tempered 2002 season, Antinucci moved to the Manor Motorsport team in British Formula 3, leaving them in 2003 for the Carlin team in the same series. Mid-season, he changed to the rival Promatecme team, although he did not stay there long as he moved to Japanese Formula Three for the 2004 season.

Antinucci moved to the Formula Three Euroseries for 2005, and although finishing nineteenth overall in his first season, in 2006 he took several race wins on his way to fifth in the championship, and second place at the end of season Macau Grand Prix, starting from fifteenth on the grid.

Antinucci drove in the Indy Pro Series in 2007 for Cheever Racing, driving for his uncle Eddie Cheever. Antinucci captured two wins and finished fifteenth in points despite only racing in the road course events, which accounted for nine of the sixteen races on the schedule. He signed with defending championship-winning team Sam Schmidt Motorsports for 2008. Antinucci won two races and was the runner-up to champion Raphael Matos at season end by 32 points.

Antinucci made his IndyCar Series debut on July 5, 2009, driving for Team 3G at Watkins Glen International.

== Racing record ==
=== Career summary ===
Season	Series	Team	Races	Wins	Poles	F.Laps	Podiums	Points	Position
1998	Formula Ford 1600 Italia	?	1	1	?	?	1	0	NC
2000	Formula Renault 2000 Eurocup	JD Motorsport	9	1	?	0	2	108	4th
2000	Formula Renault 2.0 Italia	JD Motorsport	6	0	1	0	1	42	13th
2001	Formula Renault 2000 Eurocup	Manor Motorsport	2	0	0	0	1	40	15th
2001	Formula Renault 2.0 UK	Manor Motorsport	13	4	4	4	10	337	**2nd**
2002	British Formula Three Championship	Manor Motorsport	26	0	0	1	2	89	10th
2002	Masters of Formula 3	Manor Motorsport	1	0	0	0	0	0	20th
2002	Macau Grand Prix	Promatecme	1	0	0	0	0	0	NC
2002	Korea Super Prix	Promatecme	1	0	0	0	0	0	7th
2003	British Formula Three Championship	Carlin Motorsport	24	0	0	2	4	125.5	4th
2003	Masters of Formula 3	Carlin Motorsport	1	0	0	0	0	0	32nd
2003	Macau Grand Prix	Hitech Grand Prix	1	0	0	0	0	0	NC
2003	Korea Super Prix	Hitech Grand Prix	1	1	0	0	1	0	**1st**
2004	Japanese Formula 3 Championship	TOM'S	18	1	0	1	8	161	4th
2004	Macau Grand Prix	TOM'S	1	0	0	0	0	0	9th
2004	Bahrain Super Prix	TOM'S	1	0	0	0	0	0	21st
2005	Formula 3 Euro Series	Team Midland Euroseries	8	0	0	1	0	3	19th
2005	Formula Renault 3.5 Series	Victory Engineering	2	0	0	0	0	0	NC
2006	Formula 3 Euro Series	HBR Motorsport	19	2	0	0	5	38	5th
2006	Masters of Formula 3	HBR Motorsport	1	0	0	0	0	0	12th
2006	Macau Grand Prix	ASM Formule 3	1	0	0	0	1	0	**2nd**
2007	Indy Pro Series	Cheever Racing	9	2	1	2	3	273	15th
2007	Rolex Sports Car Series	Cheever Racing	1	0	0	0	0	18	68th
2008	Indy Lights	Sam Schmidt Motorsport	16	2	0	0	8	478	**2nd**
2008	Rolex Sports Car Series	Doran Racing	1	0	0	0	0	12	61st
2009	IndyCar Series	Team 3G	5	0	0	0	0	63	27th
2010	Italian GT3 Championship	Audi Sport Italia	6	0	0	0	3	47	13th
2014	Lamborghini Super Trofeo USA - Pro	GMG Racing	2	0	0	0	0	0	NC
2014	Lamborghini Super Trofeo World Final - Pro		2	0	0	0	2	0	NC
2016	Lamborghini Super Trofeo North America - Pro	Change Racing	2	2	2	2	2	0	NC
2016	Lamborghini Super Trofeo World Final - Pro	Change Racing	2	0	0	0	1	11	5th
2016	Lamborghini Super Trofeo North America - Pro-Am	US RaceTronics	8	2	4	3	4	69	4th
2016	GT Asia Series	FFF Racing	2	0	0	0	0	0	NC
2016	IMSA SportsCar Championship - GT Daytona	O'Gara Motorsport	3	0	0	1	0	40	37th
2017	Lamborghini Super Trofeo North America - Pro	Change Racing	10	3	4	0	7	103	**2nd**
2017	Lamborghini Super Trofeo World Final - Pro	Bonaldi Motorsport	2	0	0	0	2	0	**3rd**
2017	Lamborghini Super Trofeo Europe - Pro	Bonaldi Motorsport	2	0	0	0	0	0	NC
2017	IMSA SportsCar Championship - GT Daytona	GRT Grasser Racing Team	1	0	0	0	0	22	65th
2019	Lamborghini Super Trofeo North America - Pro	Change Racing	12	3	3	3	10	124	**1st**
2019	Lamborghini Super Trofeo World Final - Pro	Change Racing	2	0	0	0	0	3	10th
2019	Blancpain GT World Challenge America	US RaceTronics	2	0	0	0	0	18	19th
2021	Lamborghini Super Trofeo North America - Pro	Dream Racing Motorsport	10	5	4	4	6	89	**1st**
2022	Lamborghini Super Trofeo North America - Pro	Dream Racing Motorsport	4	0	?	?	2	26	7th
2022	Lamborghini Super Trofeo North America - Pro-Am	Dream Racing Motorsport	6	0	0	0	0	29	11th

=== Complete Formula 3 Euro Series results ===
(key) (Races in bold indicate pole position) (Races in italics indicate fastest lap)

Year	Entrant	Chassis	Engine	1	2	3	4	5	6	7	8	9	10	11	12	13	14	15	16	17	18	19	20	DC	Points
2005	Team Midland Euroseries	Dallara F305/001	Toyota	HOC; 1; 10	**HOC**; **2**; 7	PAU; 1; 8	PAU; 2; 14	SPA; 1 DSQ	SPA; 2; 14	MCO; 1; 9	MCO; 2; 14	OSC; 1	OSC; 2	NOR; 1	NOR; 2	NÜR; 1	NÜR; 2	ZAN; 1	ZAN; 2	LAU; 1	LAU; 2	HOC; 1	HOC; 2	19th	3
2006	HBR Motorsport	Dallara F305/045	Mercedes	HOC; 1; 7	HOC; 2 DNS	LAU; 1; 5	LAU; 2; 2	OSC; 1; 9	OSC; 2 Ret	BRH; 1; 3	BRH; 2; 23	NOR; 1 DSQ	NOR; 2 EX	NÜR; 1; 7	NÜR; 2; 2	ZAN; 1; 14	ZAN; 2; 16	CAT; 1; 8	CAT; 2; 1	BUG; 1; 8	BUG; 2; 1	HOC; 1; 12	HOC; 2; 8	5th	38

=== American open–wheel racing results ===
(key) (Races in bold indicate pole position)

==== Indy Lights ====
Year	Team	1	2	3	4	5	6	7	8	9	10	11	12	13	14	15	16	Rank	Points
2007	Cheever Racing	HMS	STP1; 19	STP2; 15	INDY	MIL	IMS1; 6	IMS2; 9	IOW	WGL1; 8	WGL2; 5	NSH	MOH; 1	KTY	**SNM1**; 2	SNM2; 1	CHI	**15th**	**273**
2008	Sam Schmidt Motorsports	HMS; 2	STP1; 2	STP2; 1	**KAN**; 13	INDY; 2	MIL; 16	IOW; 9	WGL1; 2	WGL2; 1	NSH; 12	MOH1; 3	MOH2; 14	KTY; 4	SNM1; 3	SNM2; 7	CHI; 21	**2nd**	**478**

==== IndyCar Series ====
Year	Team	No.	1	2	3	4	5	6	7	8	9	10	11	12	13	14	15	16	17	Rank	Points	Ref
2009	Team 3G	98	STP	LBH	KAN	INDY	MIL	TXS	IOW	RIR	WGL; 19	TOR; 21	EDM; 22	KTY	MOH; 18	SNM; 15	CHI	MOT	HMS	27th	63	
