= 2004 Japanese Formula 3 Championship =

Seasons
- ← 2003 2005 →

The 2004 Japanese Formula 3 Championship was the 25th edition of the Japanese Formula 3 Championship. It began on 28 March at Suzuka and ended on 24 October at Motegi. Italian driver Ronnie Quintarelli took the championship title, winning eight from 20 races.

== Teams and drivers ==
- All teams were Japanese-registered. All cars were powered by Bridgestone tyres.

| Team | No | Driver | Chassis | Engine | Rounds |
|---|---|---|---|---|---|
| TOM'S | 1 | (United States) Richard Antinucci | Dallara F304 | Toyota-TOM'S 3S-GE | 1–9 |
| TOM'S | 1 | (Japan) Katsuyuki Hiranaka | Dallara F304 | Toyota-TOM'S 3S-GE | 10 |
| TOM'S | 7 | (Japan) Sakon Yamamoto | Dallara F304 | Toyota-TOM'S 3S-GE | All |
| TOM'S | 8 | (Japan) Kazuki Nakajima | Dallara F304 | Toyota-TOM'S 3S-GE | All |
| TOM'S | 36 | (Japan) Taku Bamba | Dallara F304 | Toyota-TOM'S 3S-GE | All |
| Toda Racing | 2 | (Japan) Hideki Mutoh | Lola-Dome F106/03 | Toda-Honda MF204C | All |
| Inging | 3 | (Japan) Naoki Yokomizo | Dallara F303 | Torii-Toyota 3S-GE | All |
| Inging | 4 | (Italy) Ronnie Quintarelli | Dallara F302/3 | Torii-Toyota 3S-GE | All |
| M-TEC | 10 | (Brazil) João Paulo de Oliveira | Lola-Dome F106/03 | Mugen-Honda MF204B | All |
| M-TEC | 11 | (United Kingdom) Danny Watts | Lola-Dome F106/03 | Mugen-Honda MF204B | 10 |
| ThreeBond Racing | 12 | (Brazil) Fabio Carbone | Dallara F304 | Tomei Nissan SR20VE | All |
| ThreeBond Racing | 14 | (Japan) Masataka Yanagida | Dallara F303 | Tomei Nissan SR20VE | All |
| DTM | 19 | (Japan) Hiroyoshi Shibata | Dallara F302 | Toyota-TOM'S 3S-GE | All |
| Now Motor Sports | 32 | (Japan) Wataru Kobayakawa | Lola-Dome F106/03 | Toyota-TOM'S 3S-GE | All |
| Now Motor Sports | 33 | (Japan) Daisuke Ikeda | Lola-Dome F106/03 | Toyota-TOM'S 3S-GE | All |
| Zap Speed | 50 | (Japan) Motohiko Isozaki | Dallara F304 | Toyota-TOM'S 3S-GE | All |
| Exceed Motorsports | 87 | (Japan) Kei Idaka | Dallara F302 | Toyota-TOM'S 3S-GE | 10 |

== Race calendar and results ==
| Round | | Circuit | Date | Pole position | Fastest lap | Winning driver | Winning team |
|---|---|---|---|---|---|---|---|
| 1 | R1 | Suzuka Circuit, Suzuka | 27 March | (Japan) Kazuki Nakajima | (Japan) Sakon Yamamoto | (Japan) Kazuki Nakajima | TOM'S |
| 1 | R2 | Suzuka Circuit, Suzuka | 28 March | (Japan) Kazuki Nakajima | (Brazil) João Paulo de Oliveira | (Japan) Kazuki Nakajima | TOM'S |
| 2 | R1 | Tsukuba Circuit, Shimotsuma | 10 April | (Brazil) João Paulo de Oliveira | (Brazil) João Paulo de Oliveira | (United States) Richard Antinucci | TOM'S |
| 2 | R2 | Tsukuba Circuit, Shimotsuma | 11 April | (Italy) Ronnie Quintarelli | (Brazil) Fabio Carbone | (Italy) Ronnie Quintarelli | Inging |
| 3 | R1 | Okayama International Circuit | 8 May | (Brazil) João Paulo de Oliveira | (United States) Richard Antinucci | (Brazil) João Paulo de Oliveira | M-TEC |
| 3 | R2 | Okayama International Circuit | 9 May | (Brazil) João Paulo de Oliveira | (Italy) Ronnie Quintarelli | (Italy) Ronnie Quintarelli | Inging |
| 4 | R1 | Twin Ring Motegi, Motegi | 5 June | (Brazil) João Paulo de Oliveira | (Brazil) João Paulo de Oliveira | (Brazil) Fabio Carbone | ThreeBond Racing |
| 4 | R2 | Twin Ring Motegi, Motegi | 6 June | (Brazil) João Paulo de Oliveira | (Japan) Sakon Yamamoto | (Italy) Ronnie Quintarelli | Inging |
| 5 | R1 | Suzuka Circuit, Suzuka | 3 July | (Italy) Ronnie Quintarelli | (Brazil) João Paulo de Oliveira | (Brazil) João Paulo de Oliveira | M-TEC |
| 5 | R2 | Suzuka Circuit, Suzuka | 4 July | (Brazil) João Paulo de Oliveira | (Brazil) João Paulo de Oliveira | (Italy) Ronnie Quintarelli | Inging |
| 6 | R1 | Sportsland SUGO, Murata | 31 July | (Japan) Naoki Yokomizo | (Italy) Ronnie Quintarelli | (Italy) Ronnie Quintarelli | Inging |
| 6 | R2 | Sportsland SUGO, Murata | 1 August | (Japan) Naoki Yokomizo | (Brazil) João Paulo de Oliveira | (Italy) Ronnie Quintarelli | Inging |
| 7 | R1 | Mine Circuit, Mine | 28 August | (Brazil) João Paulo de Oliveira | (Brazil) João Paulo de Oliveira | (Brazil) João Paulo de Oliveira | M-TEC |
| 7 | R2 | Mine Circuit, Mine | 29 August | (Japan) Naoki Yokomizo | (Brazil) Fabio Carbone | (Japan) Naoki Yokomizo | Inging |
| 8 | R1 | Sendai Hi-Land Raceway, Aoba-ku | 11 September | (Japan) Hiroyoshi Shibata | (Brazil) João Paulo de Oliveira | (Brazil) João Paulo de Oliveira | M-TEC |
| 8 | R2 | Sendai Hi-Land Raceway, Aoba-ku | 12 September | (Japan) Daisuke Ikeda | (Brazil) João Paulo de Oliveira | (Brazil) João Paulo de Oliveira | M-TEC |
| 9 | R1 | Mine Circuit, Mine | 2 October | (Italy) Ronnie Quintarelli | (Brazil) João Paulo de Oliveira | (Italy) Ronnie Quintarelli | Inging |
| 9 | R2 | Mine Circuit, Mine | 3 October | (Italy) Ronnie Quintarelli | (Brazil) Fabio Carbone | (Italy) Ronnie Quintarelli | Inging |
| 10 | R1 | Twin Ring Motegi, Motegi | 23 October | (Brazil) João Paulo de Oliveira | (Japan) Sakon Yamamoto | (Brazil) João Paulo de Oliveira | M-TEC |
| 10 | R2 | Twin Ring Motegi, Motegi | 24 October | (Japan) Sakon Yamamoto | (Japan) Sakon Yamamoto | (Japan) Sakon Yamamoto | TOM'S |

== Standings ==
- Points are awarded as follows:

| 1 | 2 | 3 | 4 | 5 | 6 | 7 | 8 | 9 | 10 |
|---|---|---|---|---|---|---|---|---|---|
| 20 | 15 | 12 | 10 | 8 | 6 | 4 | 3 | 2 | 1 |

| Pos | Driver | SUZ | | TSU | | OKA | | MOT | | SUZ | | SUG | | MIN | | SEN | | MIN | | MOT | | Pts |
|---|---|---|---|---|---|---|---|---|---|---|---|---|---|---|---|---|---|---|---|---|---|---|
| 1 | (Italy) Ronnie Quintarelli | 9 | 6 | 13 | **1** | 2 | 1 | 2 | 1 | **4** | 1 | 1 | 1 | 3 | 6 | 2 | 13 | **1** | **1** | Ret | 3 | 251 |
| 2 | (Brazil) João Paulo de Oliveira | 6 | Ret | **2** | 5 | **1** | **2** | **13** | **Ret** | 1 | **5** | 3 | 2 | **1** | 3 | 1 | 1 | Ret | DNS | **1** | Ret | 211 |
| 3 | (Japan) Naoki Yokomizo | 4 | 5 | 6 | 4 | Ret | 9 | 4 | 2 | 2 | Ret | **2** | **3** | 2 | **1** | 10 | 4 | Ret | 6 | 5 | 2 | 177 |
| 4 | (United States) Richard Antinucci | 7 | 2 | 1 | 2 | 6 | 4 | 3 | 3 | 5 | Ret | 10 | 7 | 4 | 2 | 3 | 2 | 9 | 11 | | | 161 |
| 5 | (Japan) Kazuki Nakajima | **1** | **1** | 7 | 9 | 3 | 6 | 6 | Ret | 6 | Ret | 4 | Ret | 9 | 11 | 5 | 5 | 4 | 3 | 9 | 4 | 138 |
| 6 | (Japan) Taku Bamba | 2 | 3 | 3 | 3 | 9 | 10 | 7 | 4 | Ret | 6 | 7 | Ret | 6 | 7 | 4 | 6 | 5 | 4 | 4 | 7 | 133 |
| 7 | (Japan) Sakon Yamamoto | 3 | 10 | 5 | 6 | Ret | 5 | 8 | 5 | Ret | 4 | 8 | Ret | 7 | 4 | Ret | 8 | 3 | 5 | 2 | **1** | 131 |
| 8 | (Brazil) Fabio Carbone | 5 | 4 | 9 | 8 | 8 | Ret | 1 | 6 | 7 | Ret | 5 | 4 | 5 | 8 | 8 | 9 | 2 | 2 | 7 | 8 | 123 |
| 9 | (Japan) Hideki Mutoh | 8 | 7 | 8 | 10 | Ret | DSQ | 5 | 7 | 3 | 2 | 9 | 6 | 8 | 5 | 9 | 7 | Ret | Ret | Ret | 5 | 83 |
| 10 | (Japan) Masataka Yanagida | 12 | 8 | 12 | 12 | 5 | 11 | 14 | 9 | 9 | 3 | 6 | 5 | 10 | NC | 7 | Ret | 7 | 7 | 8 | 10 | 58 |
| 11 | (Japan) Daisuke Ikeda | 10 | 12 | 4 | 7 | Ret | 3 | 9 | 8 | 10 | DNS | 11 | Ret | 11 | 9 | Ret | **3** | 10 | NC | 14 | 11 | 48 |
| 12 | (Japan) Wataru Kobayakawa | 11 | 11 | 11 | 11 | 4 | 7 | 10 | 10 | 8 | Ret | 13 | 8 | 12 | Ret | 6 | 10 | 6 | 8 | 11 | 12 | 38 |
| 13 | (Japan) Hiroyoshi Shibata | 13 | 9 | 10 | 13 | Ret | 8 | 11 | 11 | Ret | 7 | 12 | 9 | 13 | 12 | **Ret** | 11 | Ret | 9 | 10 | 13 | 15 |
| 14 | (Japan) Katsuyuki Hiranaka | | | | | | | | | | | | | | | | | | | 3 | 9 | 14 |
| 15 | (United Kingdom) Danny Watts | | | | | | | | | | | | | | | | | | | 6 | 6 | 12 |
| 16 | (Japan) Motohiko Isozaki | 14 | 13 | 14 | 14 | 7 | 12 | 12 | 12 | 11 | Ret | 14 | 10 | 14 | 10 | 11 | 12 | 8 | 10 | 12 | 14 | 10 |
| 17 | (Japan) Kei Idaka | | | | | | | | | | | | | | | | | | | 13 | 15 | 0 |
| Pos | Driver | SUZ | | TSU | | OKA | | MOT | | SUZ | | SUG | | MIN | | SEN | | MIN | | MOT | | Pts |

| Colour | Result |
|---|---|
| Gold | Winner |
| Silver | Second place |
| Bronze | Third place |
| Green | Points classification |
| Blue | Non-points classification |
| Blue | Non-classified finish (NC) |
| Purple | Retired, not classified (Ret) |
| Red | Did not qualify (DNQ) |
| Red | Did not pre-qualify (DNPQ) |
| Black | Disqualified (DSQ) |
| White | Did not start (DNS) |
| White | Withdrew (WD) |
| White | Race cancelled (C) |
| Blank | Did not practice (DNP) |
| Blank | Did not arrive (DNA) |
| Blank | Excluded (EX) |

**Bold** – Pole
Italics – Fastest Lap
