= 2000 Masters of Formula 3 =

Jonathan Cochet Wins F3 Masters

Race details
Date	6 August 2000
Official name	Marlboro Masters of Formula 3
Location	Circuit Park Zandvoort, Netherlands
Course	4.3 km (2.7 mi)
Distance	19 laps, 81.7 km (50.8 mi)

Pole
Driver	(France) Jonathan Cochet	Signature Competition
Time	1:33.192

Fastest Lap
Driver	(France) Jonathan Cochet	Signature Competition
Time	1:35.553 (on lap 12 of 19)

Podium
First	(France) Jonathan Cochet	Signature Competition
Second	(United Kingdom) Ben Collins	Carlin Motorsport
Third	(South Africa) Tomas Scheckter	Stewart Racing

The 2000 Marlboro Masters of Formula 3 was the tenth Masters of Formula 3 race held at Circuit Park Zandvoort on 6 August 2000. It was won by Jonathan Cochet, for Signature.

== Drivers and teams ==
2000 Entry List
Team	No	Driver	Chassis	Engine	Main series
(United Kingdom) Manor Motorsport	1	(Brazil) Antônio Pizzonia	Dallara F399	Mugen-Honda	British Formula 3
(United Kingdom) Manor Motorsport	2	(South Africa) Toby Scheckter	Dallara F399	Mugen-Honda	Eurocup Formula Renault 2.0
(France) Signature Competition	3	(France) Benoît Tréluyer	Dallara F399	Renault	All-Japan Formula Three
(France) Signature Competition	4	(France) Jonathan Cochet	Dallara F399	Renault	French Formula Three
(Netherlands) Van Amersfoort Racing	5	(Netherlands) Jeroen Bleekemolen	Dallara F399	Opel	German Formula Three
(Netherlands) Van Amersfoort Racing	6	(Belgium) Tom van Bavel	Dallara F399	Opel	German Formula Three
(United Kingdom) Stewart Racing	7	(India) Narain Karthikeyan	Dallara F300	Mugen-Honda	British Formula 3
(United Kingdom) Stewart Racing	8	(South Africa) Tomas Scheckter	Dallara F300	Mugen-Honda	British Formula 3
(France) LD Autosport	9	(Japan) Ryo Fukuda	Dallara F399	Renault	French Formula Three
(United Kingdom) Carlin Motorsport	10	(Japan) Takuma Sato	Dallara F300	Mugen-Honda	British Formula 3
(United Kingdom) Carlin Motorsport	11	(United Kingdom) Ben Collins	Dallara F300	Mugen-Honda	British Formula 3
(Germany) AIL Team Kolles Racing	14	(Sweden) Peter Sundberg	Dallara F300	Mugen-Honda	German Formula Three
(Germany) AIL Team Kolles Racing	15	(Netherlands) Elran Nijenhuis	Dallara F300	Mugen-Honda	German Formula Three
(Italy) RC Benetton Junior Team	16	(Denmark) Nicolas Kiesa	Dallara F300	Opel	British Formula 3
(Italy) RC Benetton Junior Team	17	(Serbia and Montenegro) Miloš Pavlović	Dallara F300	Opel	British Formula 3
(United Kingdom) Fortec Motorsport	18	(Italy) Gianmaria Bruni	Dallara F300	Mugen-Honda	British Formula 3
(United Kingdom) Fortec Motorsport	19	(United Kingdom) Michael Bentwood	Dallara F300	Mugen-Honda	British Formula 3
(France) ASM Elf	20	(Portugal) Tiago Monteiro	Dallara F399	Renault	French Formula Three
(France) ASM Elf	21	(France) Julien Beltoise	Dallara F399	Renault	French Formula Three
(France) ASM Elf	22	(France) Tristan Gommendy	Dallara F399	Renault	French Formula Three
(Germany) GM Motorsport	23	(Hungary) Zsolt Baumgartner	Dallara F399	Opel	German Formula Three
(Germany) GM Motorsport	24	(Japan) Toshihiro Kaneishi	Dallara F300	Opel	German Formula Three
(Germany) GM Motorsport	25	(Germany) Tony Schmidt	Dallara F399	Opel	German Formula Three
(Italy) Target Racing	26	(Italy) Matteo Grassotto	Dallara F300	Opel	Eurocup Formula Renault 2.0
(Italy) Uboldi Corse	27	(Italy) Luca Iannaccone	Dallara F399	Fiat	Austria Formula 3 Cup
(France) La Filière	28	(France) Romain Dumas	Martini MK79	Opel	French Formula Three
(France) La Filière	29	(France) James Andanson	Martini MK79	Opel	French Formula Three
(France) La Filière	30	(United Kingdom) Adam Jones	Martini MK79	Opel	French Formula Three
(United Kingdom) Andrew Kirkaldy	31	(United Kingdom) Andrew Kirkaldy	Dallara F399	Opel	British Formula 3
(Italy) Prema Powerteam	32	(Belgium) Philip Cloostermans	Dallara F300	Opel	German Formula Three
(United Kingdom) Rowan Racing	33	(Republic of Ireland) Warren Carway	Dallara F300	Mugen-Honda	British Formula 3
(United Kingdom) Rowan Racing	34	(United Kingdom) Martin O'Connell	Dallara F300	Mugen-Honda	British Formula 3
(United Kingdom) Promatecme Junior Team	35	(France) Yannick Schroeder	Dallara F399	Renault	French Formula Three
(Switzerland) Swiss Racing Team	36	(Switzerland) Giorgio Mecattaf	Dallara F399	Opel	German Formula Three
(Switzerland) Swiss Racing Team	37	(Italy) Armin Pörnbacher	Dallara F399	Opel	German Formula Three
(United Kingdom) Alan Docking Racing	38	(Italy) Omar Galeffi	Dallara F300	Mugen-Honda	
(United Kingdom) Alan Docking Racing	39	(Netherlands) Marco du Pau	Dallara F300	Mugen-Honda	
(Belgium) JB Motorsport	40	(Belgium) Nicolas Stelandre	Dallara F399	Opel	German Formula Three
(Belgium) JB Motorsport	41	(Belgium) Val Hillebrand	Dallara F399	Opel	German Formula Three

== Classification ==
=== Qualifying ===
==== Group A ====
Pos	No	Name	Team	Time	Gap
1	35	(France) Yannick Schroeder	Promatecme Junior Team	1:33.565	
2	7	(India) Narain Karthikeyan	Stewart Racing	1:33.771	+0.206
3	3	(France) Benoît Tréluyer	Signature Competition	1:33.953	+0.388
4	11	(United Kingdom) Ben Collins	Carlin Motorsport	1:34.248	+0.683
5	5	(Netherlands) Jeroen Bleekemolen	Van Amersfoort Racing	1:34.281	+0.716
6	31	(United Kingdom) Andrew Kirkaldy	Andrew Kirkaldy	1:34.282	+0.717
7	9	(Japan) Ryo Fukuda	LD Autosport	1:34.308	+0.743
8	21	(France) Julien Beltoise	ASM Elf	1:34.328	+0.763
9	23	(Hungary) Zsolt Baumgartner	GM Motorsport	1:34.399	+0.834
10	17	(Serbia and Montenegro) Miloš Pavlović	RC Benetton Junior Team	1:34.437	+0.872
11	1	(Brazil) Antônio Pizzonia	Manor Motorsport	1:34.441	+0.876
12	37	(Italy) Armin Pörnbacher	Swiss Racing Team	1:34.571	+1.006
13	25	(Germany) Tony Schmidt	GM Motorsport	1:34.583	+1.018
14	29	(France) James Andanson	La Filière	1:34.731	+1.166
15	39	(Netherlands) Marco du Pau	Alan Docking Racing	1:34.863	+1.298
16	19	(United Kingdom) Michael Bentwood	Fortec Motorsport	1:35.175	+1.610
17	15	(Netherlands) Elran Nijenhuis	AIL Team Kolles Racing	1:35.408	+1.843
18	41	(Belgium) Val Hillebrand	JB Motorsport	1:35.464	+1.899
19	33	(Republic of Ireland) Warren Carway	Rowan Racing	1:35.614	+2.049
20	27	(Italy) Luca Iannaccone	Uboldi Corse	1:41.557	+7.992

==== Group B ====
Pos	No	Name	Team	Time	Gap
1	4	(France) Jonathan Cochet	Signature Competition	1:33.192	
2	10	(Japan) Takuma Sato	Carlin Motorsport	1:33.214	+0.022
3	18	(Italy) Gianmaria Bruni	Fortec Motorsport	1:33.431	+0.239
4	24	(Japan) Toshihiro Kaneishi	GM Motorsport	1:33.498	+0.306
5	8	(South Africa) Tomas Scheckter	Stewart Racing	1:33.927	+0.735
6	6	(Belgium) Tom van Bavel	Van Amersfoort Racing	1:33.998	+0.806
7	16	(Denmark) Nicolas Kiesa	RC Benetton Junior Team	1:34.140	+0.948
8	20	(Portugal) Tiago Monteiro	ASM Elf	1:34.157	+0.965
9	26	(Italy) Matteo Grassotto	Target Racing	1:34.210	+1.018
10	14	(Sweden) Peter Sundberg	AIL Team Kolles Racing	1:34.224	+1.032
11	34	(United Kingdom) Martin O'Connell	Rowan Racing	1:34.633	+1.441
12	32	(Belgium) Philip Cloostermans	Prema Powerteam	1:34.641	+1.449
13	2	(South Africa) Toby Scheckter	Manor Motorsport	1:34.922	+1.730
14	22	(France) Tristan Gommendy	ASM Elf	1:35.147	+1.955
15	38	(Italy) Omar Galeffi	Alan Docking Racing	1:35.257	+2.065
16	40	(Belgium) Nicolas Stelandre	JB Motorsport	1:35.449	+2.257
17	28	(France) Romain Dumas	La Filière	1:35.548	+2.356
18	36	(Switzerland) Giorgio Mecattaf	Swiss Racing Team	1:35.760	+2.568
19	30	(United Kingdom) Adam Jones	La Filière	1:36.067	+2.875

=== Race ===
Pos	No	Driver	Team	Laps	Time/Retired	Grid
1	4	(France) Jonathan Cochet	Signature Competition	19	33:09.939	1
2	11	(United Kingdom) Ben Collins	Carlin Motorsport	19	+3.429	8
3	8	(South Africa) Tomas Scheckter	Stewart Racing	19	+3.801	9
4	3	(France) Benoît Tréluyer	Signature Competition	19	+7.977	6
5	24	(Japan) Toshihiro Kaneishi	GM Motorsport	19	+8.516	7
6	6	(Belgium) Tom van Bavel	Van Amersfoort Racing	19	+9.195	11
7	5	(Netherlands) Jeroen Bleekemolen	Van Amersfoort Racing	19	+10.515	10
8	31	(United Kingdom) Andrew Kirkaldy	Andrew Kirkaldy	19	+11.247	12
9	16	(Denmark) Nicolas Kiesa	RC Benetton Junior Team	19	+12.600	13
10	26	(Italy) Matteo Grassotto	Target Racing	19	+14.452	17
11	20	(Portugal) Tiago Monteiro	ASM Elf	19	+15.444	15
12	17	(Serbia and Montenegro) Miloš Pavlović	RC Benetton Junior Team	19	+15.567	20
13	21	(France) Julien Beltoise	ASM Elf	19	+22.429	16
14	34	(United Kingdom) Martin O'Connell	Rowan Racing	19	+23.593	21
15	23	(Hungary) Zsolt Baumgartner	GM Motorsport	19	+24.800	18
16	37	(Italy) Armin Pörnbacher	Swiss Racing Team	19	+27.597	24
17	25	(Germany) Tony Schmidt	GM Motorsport	19	+28.503	26
18	39	(Netherlands) Marco du Pau	Alan Docking Racing	19	+34.723	30
19	7	(India) Narain Karthikeyan	Stewart Racing	19	+44.448	4
20	2	(South Africa) Toby Scheckter	Manor Motorsport	19	+44.729	25
21	40	(Belgium) Nicolas Stelandre	JB Motorsport	19	+48.294	31
22	9	(Japan) Ryo Fukuda	LD Autosport	19	+49.206	14
23	36	(Switzerland) Giorgio Mecattaf	Swiss Racing Team	19	+51.299	35
24	38	(Italy) Omar Galeffi	Alan Docking Racing	19	+51.511	29
25	30	(United Kingdom) Adam Jones	La Filière	19	+52.066	37
26	29	(France) James Andanson	La Filière	19	+52.067	28
27	33	(Republic of Ireland) Warren Carway	Rowan Racing	19	+1:38.158	38
28	10	(Japan) Takuma Sato	Carlin Motorsport	18	+1 Lap	3
29	22	(France) Tristan Gommendy	ASM Elf	17	Retired	27
30	32	(Belgium) Philip Cloostermans	Prema Powerteam	17	Retired	23
Ret	19	(United Kingdom) Michael Bentwood	Fortec Motorsport	16	Retired	32
Ret	15	(Netherlands) Elran Nijenhuis	AIL Team Kolles Racing	15	Retired	34
Ret	41	(Belgium) Val Hillebrand	JB Motorsport	14	Retired	36
Ret	1	(Brazil) Antônio Pizzonia	Manor Motorsport	13	Retired	22
Ret	18	(Italy) Gianmaria Bruni	Fortec Motorsport	12	Retired	5
Ret	14	(Sweden) Peter Sundberg	AIL Team Kolles Racing	0	Retired	19
Ret	35	(France) Yannick Schroeder	Promatecme Junior Team	0	Retired	2
DNS	28	(France) Romain Dumas	La Filière			33
DNQ	27	(Italy) Luca Iannaccone	Uboldi Corse			
Fastest lap: Jonathan Cochet, 1:35.553, 162.004 km/h (100.665 mph) on lap 12
