= 1999 Korea Super Prix =

Seasons
- ← none 2000 →

Changwon Street Circuit

The 1999 Korea Super Prix was the inaugural Korea Super Prix race held on the streets of Changwon on November 28, 1999. It was won by British driver Darren Manning for TOM'S.

== Drivers and teams ==
1999 Entry List
Team	No	Driver	Chassis	Engine	Main series
(Japan) TOM'S	1	(United Kingdom) Darren Manning	Dallara 399	Toyota	All-Japan Formula Three
(Japan) TOM'S	2	(Japan) Seiji Ara	Dallara 399	Toyota	All-Japan Formula Three
(United Kingdom) Manor Motorsport	3	(United Kingdom) Marc Hynes	Dallara 399	Mugen-Honda	British Formula Three
(Italy) Prema Powerteam	5	(Sweden) Peter Sundberg	Dallara 399	Opel	Italian Formula Three
(Italy) Prema Powerteam	6	(Japan) Toshihiro Kaneishi	Dallara 399	Opel	All-Japan Formula Three
(France) La Filiere	7	(Japan) Ryo Fukuda	Martini MK79	Opel	French Formula Three
(United Kingdom) Stewart Racing	9	(India) Narain Karthikeyan	Dallara 399	Mugen-Honda	British Formula Three
(United Kingdom) Stewart Racing	10	(Brazil) Luciano Burti	Dallara 399	Mugen-Honda	British Formula Three
(Italy) RC Benetton Junior Team	11	(Italy) Michele Spoldi	Dallara 399	Opel	Italian Formula Three
(Italy) RC Benetton Junior Team	12	(United Kingdom) Matthew Davies	Dallara 399	Opel	British Formula Three
(Germany) Opel Team BSR	14	(Portugal) André Couto	Dallara 399	Opel	International Formula 3000
(Germany) Opel Team BSR	15	(Netherlands) Christijan Albers	Dallara 399	Opel	German Formula Three
(France) Signature Competition	17	(France) Benoît Tréluyer	Dallara 399	Renault	French Formula Three
(France) Signature Competition	18	(France) Jonathan Cochet	Dallara 399	Renault	French Formula Three
(United Kingdom) Promatecme	19	(France) Bruno Besson	Dallara 399	Renault	French Formula Three
(United Kingdom) Promatecme	20	(United Kingdom) Jenson Button	Dallara 399	Renault	British Formula Three
(Japan) Skill Speed	21	(Japan) Daisuke Ito	Dallara 399	Mugen-Honda	All-Japan Formula Three
(United Kingdom) Carlin Motorsport	22	(South Korea) Myung Mok Lee	Dallara 399	Mugen-Honda	
(United Kingdom) Carlin Motorsport	23	(Italy) Paolo Montin	Dallara 399	Mugen-Honda	Italian Formula 3000
(South Korea) Eagle Racing Team	28	(South Korea) Jungsoo Kim	Dallara 399	Mugen-Honda	
(South Korea) Indigo	29	(South Korea) Alan Cho	Dallara 399	Opel	
(France) ASM Fina	30	(Portugal) Tiago Monteiro	Dallara 399	Renault	French Formula Three
(France) ASM Fina	31	(France) Julien Beltoise	Dallara 399	Renault	French Formula Three
(Belgium) JB Motorsport	33	(Belgium) Nicolas Stelandre	Dallara 399	Opel	German Formula Three
(Belgium) JB Motorsport	34	(Belgium) Yves Olivier	Dallara 399	Opel	Eurocup Formula Renault 2.0
(United Kingdom) Alan Docking Racing	36	(Malaysia) Alex Yoong	Dallara 399	Mugen-Honda	British Formula Three
(United Kingdom) Alan Docking Racing	37	(United Kingdom) Andrew Kirkaldy	Dallara 399	Mugen-Honda	British Formula Three
(South Africa) Speedsport F3 Racing Team	38	(South Africa) Toby Scheckter	Dallara 399	Mugen-Honda	British Formula Three
(Japan) Nakajima Racing	64	(Japan) Tsugio Matsuda	Dallara 399	Mugen-Honda	All-Japan Formula Three

== Classification ==
=== Qualifying ===
- Qualifying was split into two sessions, for even-numbered cars and odd-numbered cars. The fastest car from the two sessions lined up on pole position, with the fastest from the other session lining up second. The rest of the cars lined up in session order, regardless of which session produced faster times than the other.

Pos	No	Name	Team	Time
1	1	(United Kingdom) Darren Manning	TOM'S	1:12.961
2	6	(Japan) Toshihiro Kaneishi	Prema Powerteam	1:13.520
3	15	(Netherlands) Christijan Albers	Opel Team BSR	1:13.611
4	20	(United Kingdom) Jenson Button	Promatecme	1:13.705
5	5	(Sweden) Peter Sundberg	Prema Powerteam	1:13.811
6	18	(France) Jonathan Cochet	Signature Competition	1:13.724
7	17	(France) Benoît Tréluyer	Signature Competition	1:13.976
8	10	(Brazil) Luciano Burti	Stewart Racing	1:13.731
9	9	(India) Narain Karthikeyan	Stewart Racing	1:14.025
10	30	(Portugal) Tiago Monteiro	ASM Fina	1:14.084
11	31	(France) Julien Beltoise	ASM Fina	1:14.031
12	64	(Japan) Tsugio Matsuda	Nakajima Racing	1:14.244
13	3	(United Kingdom) Marc Hynes	Manor Motorsport	1:14.037
14	34	(Belgium) Yves Olivier	JB Motorsport	1:14.352
15	23	(Italy) Paolo Montin	Carlin Motorsport	1:14.242
16	14	(Portugal) André Couto	Opel Team BSR	1:14.502
17	19	(France) Bruno Besson	Promatecme	1:14.254
18	36	(Malaysia) Alex Yoong	Alan Docking Racing	1:14.693
19	37	(United Kingdom) Andrew Kirkaldy	Alan Docking Racing	1:14.255
20	38	(South Africa) Toby Scheckter	Speedsport F3 Racing Team	1:14.726
21	7	(Japan) Ryo Fukuda	La Filiere	1:14.420
22	12	(United Kingdom) Matthew Davies	RC Benetton Junior Team	1:14.736
23	21	(Japan) Daisuke Ito	Skill Speed	1:15.164
24	2	(Japan) Seiji Ara	TOM'S	1:15.162
25	33	(Belgium) Nicolas Stelandre	JB Motorsport	1:15.211
26	22	(South Korea) Myung Mok Lee	Carlin Motorsport	1:19.121
27	11	(Italy) Michele Spoldi	RC Benetton Junior Team	1:15.434
28	28	(South Korea) Jungsoo Kim	Eagle Racing Team	no time
29	29	(South Korea) Alan Cho	Indigo	1:17.795

=== Race ===
==== Leg 1 ====
Pos	No	Driver	Team	Laps	Time/Retired	Grid
1	1	(United Kingdom) Darren Manning	TOM'S	21	26:19.354	1
2	20	(United Kingdom) Jenson Button	Promatecme	21	+ 1.042	4
3	6	(Japan) Toshihiro Kaneishi	Prema Powerteam	21	+ 26.386	2
4	18	(France) Jonathan Cochet	Signature Competition	21	+ 29.117	6
5	17	(France) Benoît Tréluyer	Signature Competition	21	+ 30.308	7
6	30	(Portugal) Tiago Monteiro	ASM Fina	21	+ 38.665	10
7	3	(United Kingdom) Marc Hynes	Manor Motorsport	21	+ 42.961	13
8	5	(Sweden) Peter Sundberg	Prema Powerteam	21	+ 46.029	5
9	34	(Belgium) Yves Olivier	JB Motorsport	21	+ 51.892	14
10	38	(South Africa) Toby Scheckter	Speedsport F3 Racing Team	21	+ 53.459	20
11	21	(Japan) Daisuke Ito	Skill Speed	21	+ 59.783	23
12	11	(Italy) Michele Spoldi	RC Benetton Junior Team	21	+ 1:01.684	27
13	2	(Japan) Seiji Ara	TOM'S	21	+ 1:02.286	24
14	19	(France) Bruno Besson	Promatecme	21	+ 1:04.816	17
15	37	(United Kingdom) Andrew Kirkaldy	Alan Docking Racing	21	+ 1:14.780	19
16	33	(Belgium) Nicolas Stelandre	JB Motorsport	21	+ 1:20.159	25
17	29	(South Korea) Alan Cho	Indigo	21	+ 1:55.291	29
18	23	(Italy) Paolo Montin	Carlin Motorsport	20	+ 1 Lap	15
19	12	(United Kingdom) Matthew Davies	RC Benetton Junior Team	20	+ 1 Lap	22
20	29	(South Korea) Myung Mok Lee	Carlin Motorsport	20	+ 1 Lap	26
NC	22	(South Korea) Jungsoo Kim	Eagle Racing Team	17	+ 4 Laps	28
Ret	36	(Malaysia) Alex Yoong	Alan Docking Racing	15	Accident	18
Ret	15	(Netherlands) Christijan Albers	Opel Team BSR	6	Accident	3
Ret	10	(Brazil) Luciano Burti	Stewart Racing	6	Accident	8
Ret	9	(India) Narain Karthikeyan	Stewart Racing	6	Accident	9
Ret	31	(France) Julien Beltoise	ASM Fina	6	Accident	11
Ret	64	(Japan) Tsugio Matsuda	Nakajima Racing	6	Accident	12
Ret	14	(Portugal) André Couto	Opel Team BSR	6	Accident	16
Ret	7	(Japan) Ryo Fukuda	La Filiere	6	Accident	21
Fastest lap and lap record: Darren Manning, 1:13.466, 149.163 km/h (92.686 mph) on lap 8
The race was stopped on lap seven, due to an accident. The race was restarted and run to aggregate times.

==== Leg 2 ====
Pos	No	Driver	Team	Laps	Time/Retired	Grid
1	1	(United Kingdom) Darren Manning	TOM'S	25	38:22.451	1
2	20	(United Kingdom) Jenson Button	Promatecme	25	+ 0.035	2
3	17	(France) Benoît Tréluyer	Signature Competition	25	+ 4.991	5
4	3	(United Kingdom) Marc Hynes	Manor Motorsport	25	+ 6.472	7
5	18	(France) Jonathan Cochet	Signature Competition	25	+ 9.814	4
6	30	(Portugal) Tiago Monteiro	ASM Fina	25	+ 10.103	6
7	34	(Belgium) Yves Olivier	JB Motorsport	25	+ 10.879	9
8	11	(Italy) Michele Spoldi	RC Benetton Junior Team	25	+ 11.521	12
9	38	(South Africa) Toby Scheckter	Speedsport F3 Racing Team	25	+ 13.965	10
10	36	(Malaysia) Alex Yoong	Alan Docking Racing	25	+ 14.641	22
11	12	(United Kingdom) Matthew Davies	RC Benetton Junior Team	25	+ 15.979	19
12	6	(Japan) Toshihiro Kaneishi	Prema Powerteam	25	+ 16.105	3
13	29	(South Korea) Alan Cho	Indigo	25	+ 29.176	17
14	21	(Japan) Daisuke Ito	Skill Speed	24	+ 1 Lap	11
15	22	(South Korea) Jungsoo Kim	Eagle Racing Team	23	+ 2 Laps	21
Ret	2	(Japan) Seiji Ara	TOM'S	19	Spin	13
Ret	14	(Portugal) André Couto	Opel Team BSR	15	Accident	24
Ret	23	(Italy) Paolo Montin	Carlin Motorsport	15	Accident	18
Ret	33	(Belgium) Nicolas Stelandre	JB Motorsport	14	Accident	16
Ret	29	(South Korea) Myung Mok Lee	Carlin Motorsport	13	Accident	20
Ret	15	(Netherlands) Christijan Albers	Opel Team BSR	10	Spin	23
Ret	5	(Sweden) Peter Sundberg	Prema Powerteam	9	Accident damage	8
Ret	19	(France) Bruno Besson	Promatecme	8	Accident	14
Ret	37	(United Kingdom) Andrew Kirkaldy	Alan Docking Racing	7	Wheel	15
DNS	10	(Brazil) Luciano Burti	Stewart Racing		Accident damage	25
DNS	9	(India) Narain Karthikeyan	Stewart Racing		Accident damage	26
DNS	31	(France) Julien Beltoise	ASM Fina		Accident damage	27
DNS	64	(Japan) Tsugio Matsuda	Nakajima Racing		Accident damage	28
DNS	7	(Japan) Ryo Fukuda	La Filiere		Accident damage	29
Fastest lap: Darren Manning, 1:13.884, 148.319 km/h (92.161 mph) on lap 9

==== Combined ====
Pos	No	Driver	Team	Laps	Time/Retired
1	1	(United Kingdom) Darren Manning	TOM'S	46	1:04:41.805
2	20	(United Kingdom) Jenson Button	Promatecme	46	+ 1.077
3	17	(France) Benoît Tréluyer	Signature Competition	46	+ 35.299
4	18	(France) Jonathan Cochet	Signature Competition	46	+ 38.931
5	6	(Japan) Toshihiro Kaneishi	Prema Powerteam	46	+ 42.491
6	30	(Portugal) Tiago Monteiro	ASM Fina	46	+ 48.768
7	3	(United Kingdom) Marc Hynes	Manor Motorsport	46	+ 49.433
8	34	(Belgium) Yves Olivier	JB Motorsport	46	+ 1:02.771
9	38	(South Africa) Toby Scheckter	Speedsport F3 Racing Team	46	+ 1:07.424
10	11	(Italy) Michele Spoldi	RC Benetton Junior Team	46	+ 1:13.205
11	29	(South Korea) Alan Cho	Indigo	46	+ 2:24.467
12	12	(United Kingdom) Matthew Davies	RC Benetton Junior Team	45	+ 1 Lap
13	21	(Japan) Daisuke Ito	Skill Speed	45	+ 1 Lap
Ret	2	(Japan) Seiji Ara	TOM'S	40	Spin
NC	36	(Malaysia) Alex Yoong	Alan Docking Racing	40	+ 6 Laps
NC	22	(South Korea) Jungsoo Kim	Eagle Racing Team	40	+ 6 Laps
Ret	33	(Belgium) Nicolas Stelandre	JB Motorsport	35	Accident
Ret	23	(Italy) Paolo Montin	Carlin Motorsport	35	Accident
Ret	29	(South Korea) Myung Mok Lee	Carlin Motorsport	33	Accident
Ret	5	(Sweden) Peter Sundberg	Prema Powerteam	30	Accident damage
Ret	19	(France) Bruno Besson	Promatecme	29	Accident
Ret	37	(United Kingdom) Andrew Kirkaldy	Alan Docking Racing	28	Wheel
Ret	14	(Portugal) André Couto	Opel Team BSR	21	Accident
Ret	15	(Netherlands) Christijan Albers	Opel Team BSR	16	Spin
Ret	10	(Brazil) Luciano Burti	Stewart Racing	6	Accident
Ret	9	(India) Narain Karthikeyan	Stewart Racing	6	Accident
Ret	31	(France) Julien Beltoise	ASM Fina	6	Accident
Ret	64	(Japan) Tsugio Matsuda	Nakajima Racing	6	Accident
Ret	7	(Japan) Ryo Fukuda	La Filiere	6	Accident
Fastest lap: Darren Manning, 1:13.466, 149.163 km/h (92.686 mph) on lap 8

== See also ==
- Korea Super Prix
