= 1999 Pau Grand Prix =

Race details
- Date: 23 May 1999
- Official name: LIX Pau Grand Prix
- Location: Pau, France
- Course: Temporary Street Circuit
- Course length: 2.760 km (1.720 miles)
- Distance: 25 laps, 69.000 km (42.874 miles)

Pole position
Driver	(France) Benoît Tréluyer	Signature Team

Fastest lap
Driver	(France) Sébastien Bourdais	La Filière
- Time: 1:13.560

Podium
First	(France) Benoît Tréluyer	Signature Team
Second	(France) Sébastien Dumez	ASM Fina
Third	(Sweden) Peter Sundberg	Prema Powerteam

The 1999 Pau Grand Prix was a Formula Three motor race held on 23 May 1999 at the Pau circuit, in Pau, Pyrénées-Atlantiques, France. The Grand Prix was won by Benoît Tréluyer, driving for Signature Team. Sébastien Dumez finished second and Peter Sundberg third.

== Entry list ==
Team	No.	Driver	Chassis	Engine
(France) ASM Fina	1	(France) Julien Beltoise	Dallara F399	Renault
(France) ASM Fina	2	(Portugal) Tiago Monteiro	Dallara F399	Renault
(France) ASM Fina	3	(France) Sébastien Dumez	Dallara F399	Renault
(France) Signature Team	4	(France) Jonathan Cochet	Dallara F399	Renault
(France) Signature Team	5	(France) Benoît Tréluyer	Dallara F399	Renault
(Italy) Team Ghinzani	6	(Italy) Michele Spoldi	Dallara F399	BMW
(Italy) Team Ghinzani	7	(Italy) Davide Uboldi	Dallara F399	Fiat
(Italy) RC Benetton	8	(Switzerland) Gabriele Varano	Dallara F399	Opel
(Italy) RC Benetton	9	(Italy) Gianluca Calcagni	Dallara F399	Opel
(France) Graff Racing	10	(Germany) Alex Müller	Dallara F399	Opel
(France) Graff Racing	11	(France) Jérémie Dufour	Martini MK49	Opel
(Italy) Ravarotto Racing Team	12	(Italy) Enrico Toccacelo	Dallara F399	BMW
(United Kingdom) Carlin Motorsport	14	(United Kingdom) Michael Bentwood	Dallara F399	Mugen-Honda
(United Kingdom) Carlin Motorsport	15	(India) Narain Karthikeyan	Dallara F399	Mugen-Honda
(Italy) Target Racing	18	(Italy) Omar Galeffi	Dallara F399	Opel
(Italy) Prema Powerteam	21	(Argentina) Juan Manuel López	Dallara F399	Opel
(Italy) Prema Powerteam	22	(Sweden) Peter Sundberg	Dallara F399	Opel
(Italy) Prema Powerteam	23	(Italy) Fulvio Cavicchi	Dallara F399	Opel
(France) Promatecme	25	(France) Bruno Besson	Dallara F399	Renault
(France) La Filière	56	(Japan) Ryō Fukuda	Martini MK79	Opel
(France) La Filière	57	(France) Yannick Schroeder	Martini MK79	Opel
(France) La Filière	72	(France) Sébastien Bourdais	Martini MK79	Opel

== Classification ==
=== Qualification Race ===
Tréluyer lead the race to take the win in the first race of two, and set himself up for the feature race. He was followed by Calcagni and Dumez.

Pos	No	Driver	Vehicle	Laps	Time/Retired	Grid
1	5	(France) Benoît Tréluyer	Signature Team	25	30min 51.511sec	1
2	9	(Italy) Gianluca Calcagni	RC Benetton	25	+ 8.814 s	3
3	3	(France) Sébastien Dumez	ASM Fina	25	+ 12.954 s	5
4	22	(Sweden) Peter Sundberg	Prema Powerteam	25	+ 14.635 s	6
5	1	(France) Julien Beltoise	ASM Fina	25	+ 18.130 s	7
6	4	(France) Jonathan Cochet	Signature Team	25	+ 18.496 s	8
7	25	(France) Bruno Besson	Promatecme	25	+ 19.776 s	9
8	21	(Argentina) Juan Manuel López	Prema Powerteam	25	+ 31.260 s	11
9	6	(Italy) Michele Spoldi	Team Ghinzani	25	+ 31.962 s	14
10	15	(India) Narain Karthikeyan	Carlin Motorsport	25	+ 40.825 s	15
11	57	(France) Yannick Schroeder	La Filière	25	+ 41.591 s	13
12	18	(Italy) Omar Galeffi	Target Racing	25	+ 42.630 s	4
13	11	(France) Jérémie Dufour	Graff Racing	25	+ 43.996 s	17
14	12	(Italy) Enrico Toccacelo	Ravarotto Racing Team	25	+ 45.090 s	20
15	2	(Portugal) Tiago Monteiro	ASM Fina	25	+ 49.401 s	16
16	23	(Italy) Fulvio Cavicchi	Prema Powerteam	25	+ 53.345 s	21
17	7	(Italy) Davide Uboldi	Team Ghinzani	25	+ 55.509 s	19
18	10	(Germany) Alex Müller	Graff Racing	24	+ 1 lap	12
Ret	56	(Japan) Ryō Fukuda	La Filière	21	Retired	10
Ret	72	(France) Sébastien Bourdais	La Filière	15	Retired	2
Ret	8	(Switzerland) Gabriele Varano	RC Benetton	13	Retired	18
Ret	14	(United Kingdom) Michael Bentwood	Carlin Motorsport	2	Retired	22
Fastest Lap: (France) Benoît Tréluyer (Signature Team) – 1:12.990 (136.128 km/h)

=== Main Race ===
An exceptional race by Tréluyer meant that he would lead from start-to-finish. Bourdais was seemingly the only person who could mount such a challenge, but after retiring on lap 15, it was a relatively easy run until the finish for Tréluyer. Although, Dumez did close up the gap considerably toward the end, with the winning margin being less than two seconds.

Pos	No	Driver	Vehicle	Laps	Time/Retired	Grid
1	5	(France) Benoît Tréluyer	Signature Team	25	30min 51.026sec	1
2	3	(France) Sébastien Dumez	ASM Fina	25	+ 1.711 s	3
3	22	(Sweden) Peter Sundberg	Prema Powerteam	25	+ 9.081 s	4
4	4	(France) Jonathan Cochet	Signature Team	25	+ 9.950 s	6
5	9	(Italy) Gianluca Calgani	RC Benetton	25	+ 10.873 s	2
6	25	(France) Bruno Besson	Promatecme	25	+ 15.291 s	7
7	21	(Argentina) Juan Manuel López	Prema Powerteam	25	+ 17.300 s	8
8	12	(Italy) Enrico Toccacelo	Prema Powerteam	25	+ 17.840 s	14
9	6	(Italy) Michele Spoldi	Team Ghinzani	25	+ 18.206 s	9
10	11	(France) Jérémie Dufour	Graff Racing	25	+ 18.898 s	13
11	72	(France) Sébastien Bourdais	La Filière	25	+ 19.296 s	20
12	2	(Portugal) Tiago Monteiro	ASM Fina	25	+ 22.070 s	15
13	57	(France) Yannick Schroeder	La Filière	25	+ 23.179 s	11
14	10	(Germany) Alex Müller	Graff Racing	25	+ 23.952 s	18
15	18	(Italy) Omar Galeffi	Target Racing	25	+ 24.462 s	12
16	56	(Japan) Ryō Fukuda	La Filière	25	+ 25.302 s	19
17	23	(Italy) Fulvio Cavicchi	Prema Powerteam	25	+ 35.891 s	16
18	8	(Switzerland) Gabriele Varano	RC Benetton	23	+ 2 laps	21
19	1	(France) Julien Beltoise	ASM Fina	22	+ 3 laps	5
Ret	15	(India) Narain Karthikeyan	Carlin Motorsport	17	Retired	10
Ret	14	(United Kingdom) Michael Bentwood	Carlin Motorsport	15	Retired	22
Ret	7	(Italy) Davide Uboldi	Team Ghinzani	10	Retired	17
Fastest Lap: (France) Sébastien Bourdais (La Filière) – 1:13.560 (135.073 km/h)

Preceded by 1998 Pau Grand Prix	Pau Grand Prix; 1999	Succeeded by 2000 Pau Grand Prix
