= 2000 Pau Grand Prix =

Race details
- Date: 12 June 2000
- Official name: LIX Pau Grand Prix
- Location: Pau, France
- Course: Temporary Street Circuit
- Course length: 2.760 km (1.720 miles)
- Distance: 36 laps, 99.360 km (61.739 miles)

Pole position
Driver	(France) Jonathan Cochet	Signature Team
- Time: 1:11.096

Fastest lap
Driver	(France) Jonathan Cochet	Signature Team
- Time: 1:11.939

Podium
First	(France) Jonathan Cochet	Signature Team
Second	(Portugal) Tiago Monteiro	ASM Formule 3
Third	(Austria) Patrick Friesacher	Bertram Schäfer Racing

The 2000 Pau Grand Prix was a Formula Three motor race held on 12 June 2000 at the Pau circuit, in Pau, Pyrénées-Atlantiques, France. The Grand Prix was won by Jonathan Cochet, driving for Signature Team. Tiago Monteiro finished second and Patrick Friesacher third.

== Entry list ==
Team	No.	Driver	Chassis	Engine
(France) La Filière	1	(France) James Andanson	Martini MK79	Opel
(France) La Filière	2	(China) Ying Kin Lee	Martini MK79	Opel
(France) La Filière	3	(France) Romain Dumas	Martini MK79	Opel
(France) La Filière	14	(United Kingdom) Adam Jones	Martini MK79	Opel
(France) La Filière	15	(United States) Philip Giebler	Martini MK79	Opel
(France) Signature Team	4	(France) Mathieu Zangarelli	Dallara F399	Renault
(France) Signature Team	5	(France) Jonathan Cochet	Dallara F399	Renault
(France) Promatecme	6	(France) Yannick Schroeder	Dallara F399	Renault
(France) ASM Formule 3	7	(Portugal) Tiago Monteiro	Dallara F399	Renault
(France) ASM Formule 3	8	(France) Tristan Gommendy	Dallara F399	Renault
(France) ASM Formule 3	9	(France) Julien Beltoise	Dallara F399	Renault
(France) Mygale	10	(Australia) Marcos Ambrose	Martini MK79	Renault
(Italy) RC Benetton	11	(Serbia and Montenegro) Miloš Pavlović	Dallara F300	Opel
(Italy) RC Benetton	12	(Denmark) Nicolas Kiesa	Dallara F300	Opel
(France) EMC2 Mygale	16	(France) Julien Piguet	Dallara F396	Opel
(United Kingdom) Rowan Racing	17	(United Kingdom) Martin O'Connell	Dallara F300	Mugen-Honda
(United Kingdom) Rowan Racing	20	(Republic of Ireland) Warren Carway	Dallara F300	Mugen-Honda
(France) Griffiths	18	(France) David Moretti	Dallara F396	Fiat
(France) Griffiths	19	(France) Frédéric Makowiecki	Dallara F396	Fiat
(France) Griffiths	37	(France) Pierre Gilbert	Dallara F396	Fiat
(United Kingdom) Manor Motorsport	21	(Brazil) Antônio Pizzonia	Dallara F399	Mugen-Honda
(United Kingdom) Manor Motorsport	22	(Argentina) Juan Manuel López	Dallara F399	Mugen-Honda
(France) LD Autosport	25	(Japan) Ryō Fukuda	Dallara F399	Renault
(France) LD Autosport	64	(France) Lucas Lasserre	Dallara F399	Renault
(Italy) Uboldi Corse SRL	26	(Italy) Davide Uboldi	Dallara F399	Fiat
(Italy) Target Racing	27	(Italy) Paolo Montin	Dallara F399	Opel
(United Kingdom) Carlin Motorsport	29	(Japan) Takuma Sato	Dallara F300	Mugen-Honda
(United Kingdom) Carlin Motorsport	30	(United Kingdom) Ben Collins	Dallara F300	Mugen-Honda
(Germany) Bertram Schäfer Racing	31	(Austria) Patrick Friesacher	Dallara F300	Renault
(Germany) Bertram Schäfer Racing	32	(Germany) André Lotterer	Dallara F399	Renault

== Classification ==
=== Qualifying ===
==== Group A ====
Pos	No.	Driver	Team	Qualifying 1	Qualifying 2	Gap	Grid
1	4	(France) Mathieu Zangarelli	Signature Team	1:13.037	1:11.276		2
2	21	(Brazil) Antônio Pizzonia	Manor Motorsport	1:12.629	1:11.598	+ 0.322 s	4
3	25	(Japan) Ryō Fukuda	LD Autosport	1:13.472	1:11.672	+ 0.396 s	6
4	11	(Serbia and Montenegro) Miloš Pavlović	RC Benetton	1:13.146	1:11.844	+ 0.568 s	8
5	9	(France) Julien Beltoise	ASM Formule 3	1:13.512	1:11.991	+ 0.715 s	10
6	32	(Germany) André Lotterer	Bertram Schäfer Racing	1:13.393	1:12.095	+ 0.819 s	12
7	15	(United States) Philip Giebler	La Filière	1:14.336	1:12.355	+ 1.079 s	14
8	6	(France) Yannick Schroeder	Promatecme	1:13.367	1:12.374	+ 1.098 s	16
9	26	(Italy) Davide Uboldi	Uboldi Corse SRL	1:13.572	1:12.789	+ 1.513 s	18
10	1	(France) James Andanson	La Filière	1:13.995	1:12.809	+ 1.533 s	20
11	8	(France) Tristan Gommendy	ASM Formule 3	1:14.258	1:12.843	+ 1.567 s	22
12	29	(Japan) Takuma Sato	Carlin Motorsport	1:12.983	1:12.883	+ 1.607 s	24
13	16	(France) Julien Piguet	EMC2 Mygale	1:15.544	1:14.673	+ 3.397 s	26
14	20	(Republic of Ireland) Warren Carway	Rowan Racing	1:17.987	1:14.814	+ 3.538 s	28
15	18	(France) David Moretti	Griffith's	1:19.789	1:16.063	+ 4.787 s	-

==== Group B ====
Pos	No.	Driver	Team	Qualifying 1	Qualifying 2	Gap	Grid
1	5	(France) Jonathan Cochet	Signature Team	1:11.945	1:11.096		1
2	7	(Portugal) Tiago Monteiro	ASM Formule 3	1:11.930	1:11.487	+ 0.387 s	3
3	31	(Austria) Patrick Friesacher	Bertram Schäfer Racing	1:12.101	1:11.508	+ 0.412 s	5
4	12	(Denmark) Nicolas Kiesa	RC Benetton	1:12.442	1:11.854	+ 0.758 s	7
5	22	(Argentina) Juan Manuel López	Manor Motorsport	1:13.109	1:12.044	+ 0.948 s	9
6	64	(France) Lucas Lasserre	LD Autosport	1:12.811	1:12.073	+ 0.977 s	11
7	27	(Italy) Paolo Montin	Target Racing	1:12.589	1:12.079	+ 0.983 s	13
8	14	(United Kingdom) Adam Jones	La Filere	1:13.069	1:12.209	+ 1.113 s	15
9	17	(United Kingdom) Martin O'Connell	Rowan Racing	1:13.598	1:12.297	+ 1.201 s	17
10	3	(France) Romain Dumas	La Filere	1:13.002	1:12.548	+ 1.452 s	19
11	30	(United Kingdom) Ben Collins	Carlin Motorsport	1:13.295	1:12.592	+ 1.496 s	21
12	2	(China) Ying Kin Lee	La Filere	1:13.929	1:12.959	+ 1.863 s	23
13	10	(Australia) Marcos Ambrose	Mygale	1:13.391	1:13.034	+ 1.938 s	25
14	19	(France) Frédéric Makowiecki	Griffith's	1:17.836	1:16.102	+ 5.006 s	27
15	37	(France) Pierre Gilbert	Griffith's	1:22.277	1:17.296	+ 6.200 s	29

Preceded by 1999 Pau Grand Prix	Pau Grand Prix; 2000	Succeeded by 2001 Pau Grand Prix
