= André Lotterer =

German racing driver (born 1981)

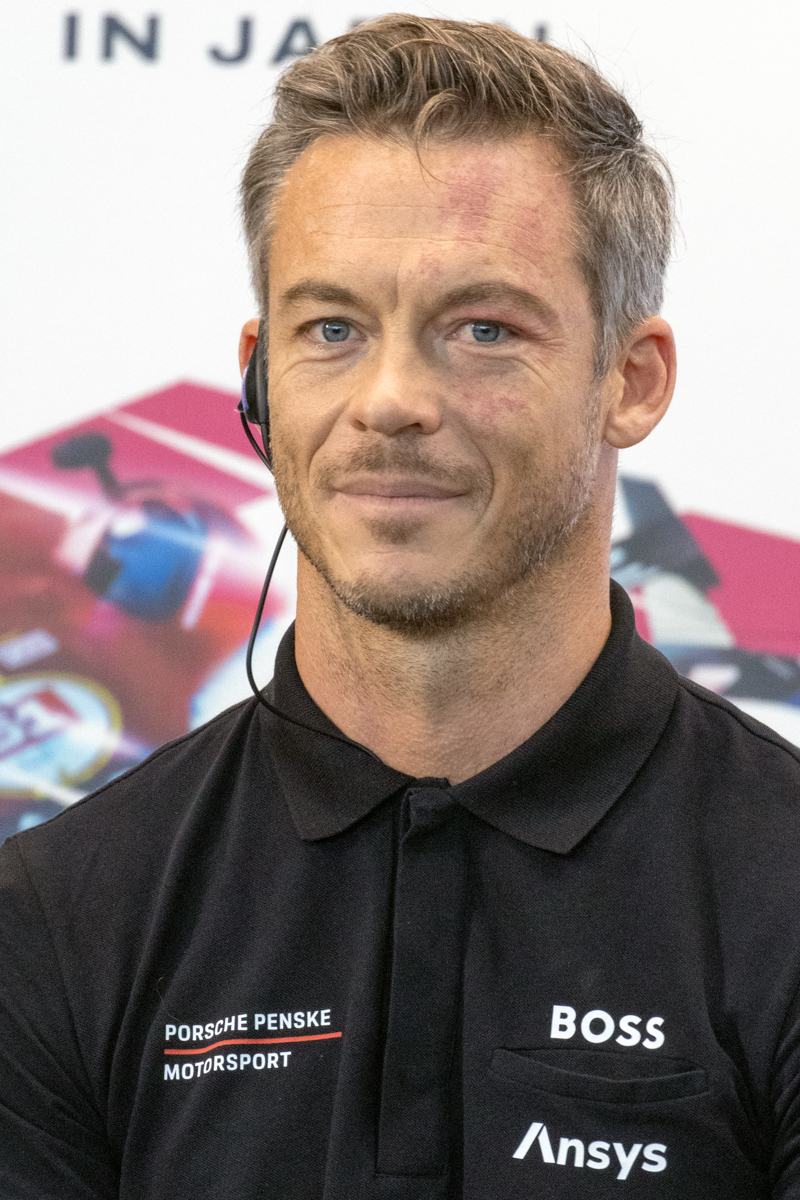
- Lotterer at the 2024 6 Hours of Fuji
- Nationality: (Germany) German
- Born: 19 November 1981 (age 45) Duisburg, North Rhine-Westphalia, West Germany

FIA World Endurance Championship career
- Debut season: 2012
- Current team: Genesis Magma Racing
- Categorisation: FIA Platinum
- Car number: 17
- Former teams: Audi, Porsche, Rebellion
- Starts: 80
- Championships: 2 (2012, 2024)
- Wins: 12
- Podiums: 42
- Poles: 14
- Fastest laps: 11
- Best finish: 1st in 2012 (LMP1), 2024 (HY)

Formula E career
- Years active: 2017–2023
- Teams: Techeetah, Porsche, Andretti
- Car number: 18 (2017–2018); 36 (2018–2023)
- Starts: 81
- Championships: 0
- Wins: 0
- Podiums: 8
- Poles: 2
- Fastest laps: 4
- Best finish: 8th in 2017–18, 2018–19, 2019–20

Formula One World Championship career
- Active years: 2014
- Team: Caterham
- Entries: 1
- Championships: 0
- Wins: 0
- Podiums: 0
- Career points: 0
- Pole positions: 0
- Fastest laps: 0
- First entry: 2014 Belgian Grand Prix

Super Formula career
- Years active: 2003–2017
- Teams: Nakajima, TOM'S
- Starts: 123
- Championships: 1 (2011)
- Wins: 24
- Podiums: 56
- Poles: 11
- Fastest laps: 10

Super GT career
- Years active: 2003–2011
- Teams: Nakajima, TOM'S
- Starts: 70
- Championships: 2 (2006, 2009)
- Wins: 5
- Podiums: 19
- Poles: 1
- Fastest laps: 2
- Best finish: 1st in 2006, 2009 (GT500)

24 Hours of Le Mans career
- Years: 2009–2019, 2023–2024
- Teams: Kolles, Audi, Porsche, Rebellion
- Best finish: 1st (2011, 2012, 2014)
- Class wins: 3 (2011, 2012, 2014)

Previous series
- 2001 2000 1999 1999 1998: British F3; German F3; Formula Renault Eurocup; Formula BMW ADAC; Formula BMW Junior

Championship titles
- 1999 1998: Formula BMW ADAC; Formula BMW Junior

André Lotterer (born 19 November 1981) is a German racing driver who competes in the FIA World Endurance Championship for Genesis Magma Racing. In endurance racing, Lotterer has won two FIA World Endurance Drivers' Championship titles in 2012 and 2024 with Audi and Porsche, respectively, and is a three-time winner of the 24 Hours of Le Mans with Audi. In Japanese motorsport, Lotterer won the Formula Nippon Championship in 2011, and is a two-time champion of Super GT, all with TOM'S.

Lotterer was also a test driver for the Jaguar Formula One team in 2002. Twelve years later, he joined Caterham, replacing Kamui Kobayashi at the 2014 Belgian Grand Prix. Later he competed in Formula E from 2017 to 2023.

== Early life ==
Born in Duisburg, Lotterer is the son of a German-Peruvian father, Henri Lotterer, and a Belgian mother. He was raised with his mother in Nivelles, Belgium, from an early age, where he began his racing career by karting at the age of seven, effectively becoming an adopted Belgian.

== Endurance racing career ==
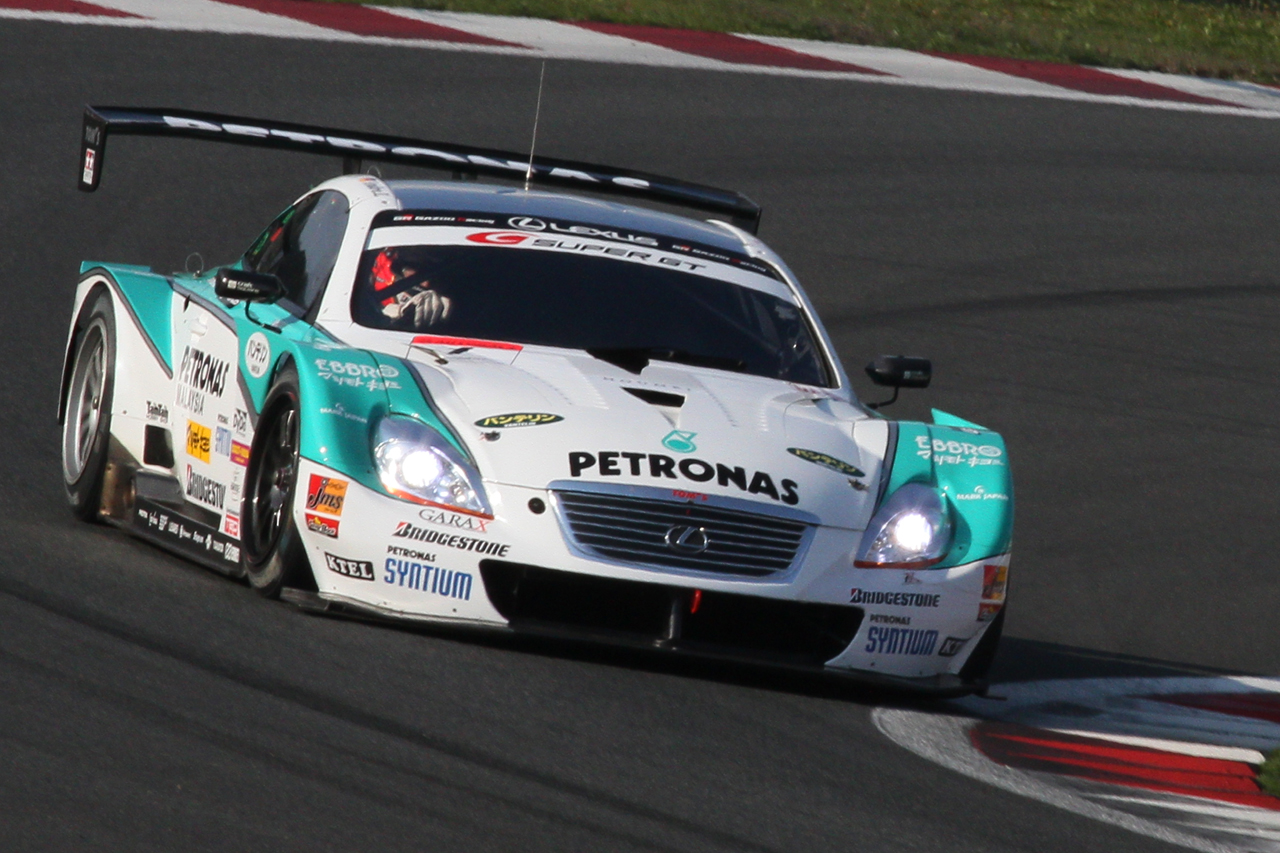
Lotterer driving the Lexus SC 430 for Lexus Team Petronas TOM'S at the 2010 Super GT Fuji 400km race.

After his stint with Jaguar in Formula One, Lotterer moved to Japan, winning both the Super GT Championship in 2006 and 2009 as well as the Formula Nippon (currently known as Super Formula) Championship in 2011.

Lotterer also made his debut in the 2009 24 Hours of Le Mans, as a race week fill-in driver for the Kolles privateer Audi team. Lotterer and co-driver Charles Zwolsman Jr., also a Le Mans rookie, drove the entire race themselves after third driver Narain Karthikeyan dislocated his shoulder in a non-racing related injury. Driving an Audi R10, the car that won the 2006, 2007 and 2008 Le Mans races, Lotterer and Zwolsman finished seventh overall and in the LMP1 class.

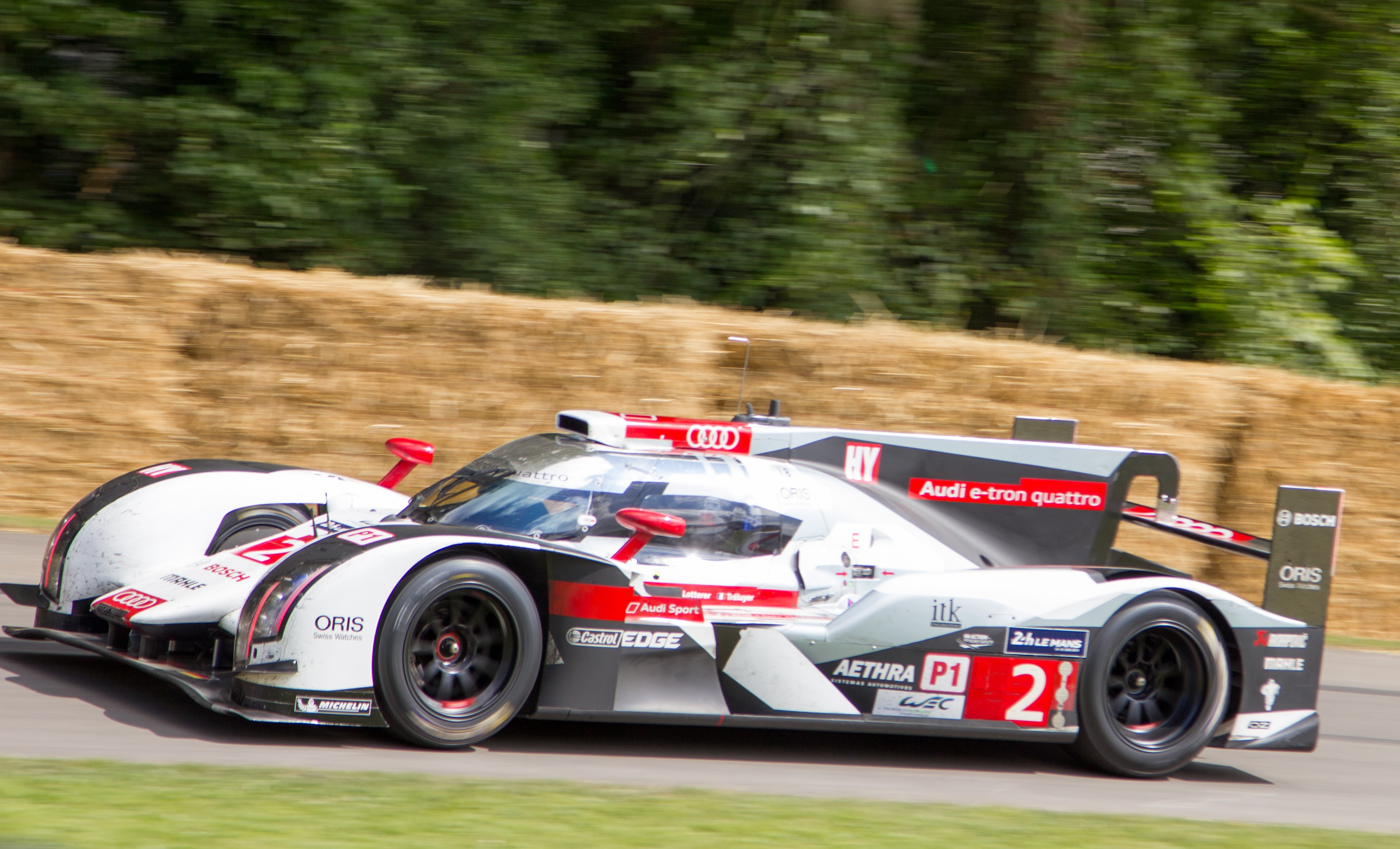
Lotterer with the Audi R18 e-tron quattro at the Goodwood Festival of Speed in 2014.

Lotterer's impressive performance that year earned him a drive with the works Audi Sport team in the 2010 24 Hours of Le Mans, driving the new Audi R15 TDI plus. Along with Marcel Fässler and Benoît Tréluyer, he finished second overall and in the LMP1 class, despite the rival Peugeot 908s dominating for the first part of the race.

Lotterer remained with Audi Sport to compete in the 2011 24 Hours of Le Mans, co-driving the newly designed Audi R18 with Marcel Fässler and Benoît Tréluyer. After the Audi works team lost two out of three cars due to accidents, Lotterer and his co-drivers held off three Peugeot 908 works cars to claim both first place in the LMP1 class and the overall victory, beating the second place Peugeot by a mere thirteen seconds. This win gave Audi a total of ten overall victories at Le Mans, and Lotterer his first overall win at Le Mans.

From 2012 to 2016, Lotterer competed in the FIA World Endurance Championship, continuing to drive for Audi Sport Team Joest with the R18. During his tenure with Audi in the WEC, Lotterer won the drivers' championship in the series' inaugural season with Benoît Tréluyer and Marcel Fässler. After Audi Sport Team Joest decided not to run in WEC for 2017, Lotterer moved to Porsche as the driver of the No. 1 car with Nick Tandy and 2016 drivers' world champion Neel Jani. Prior to joining Porsche, he received an offer to join Toyota.

After 2017, Porsche departed the series and from LMP1 competition. Lotterer joined Rebellion Racing for the 2018–19 season, joining Jani and Bruno Senna in the No. 1 entry.

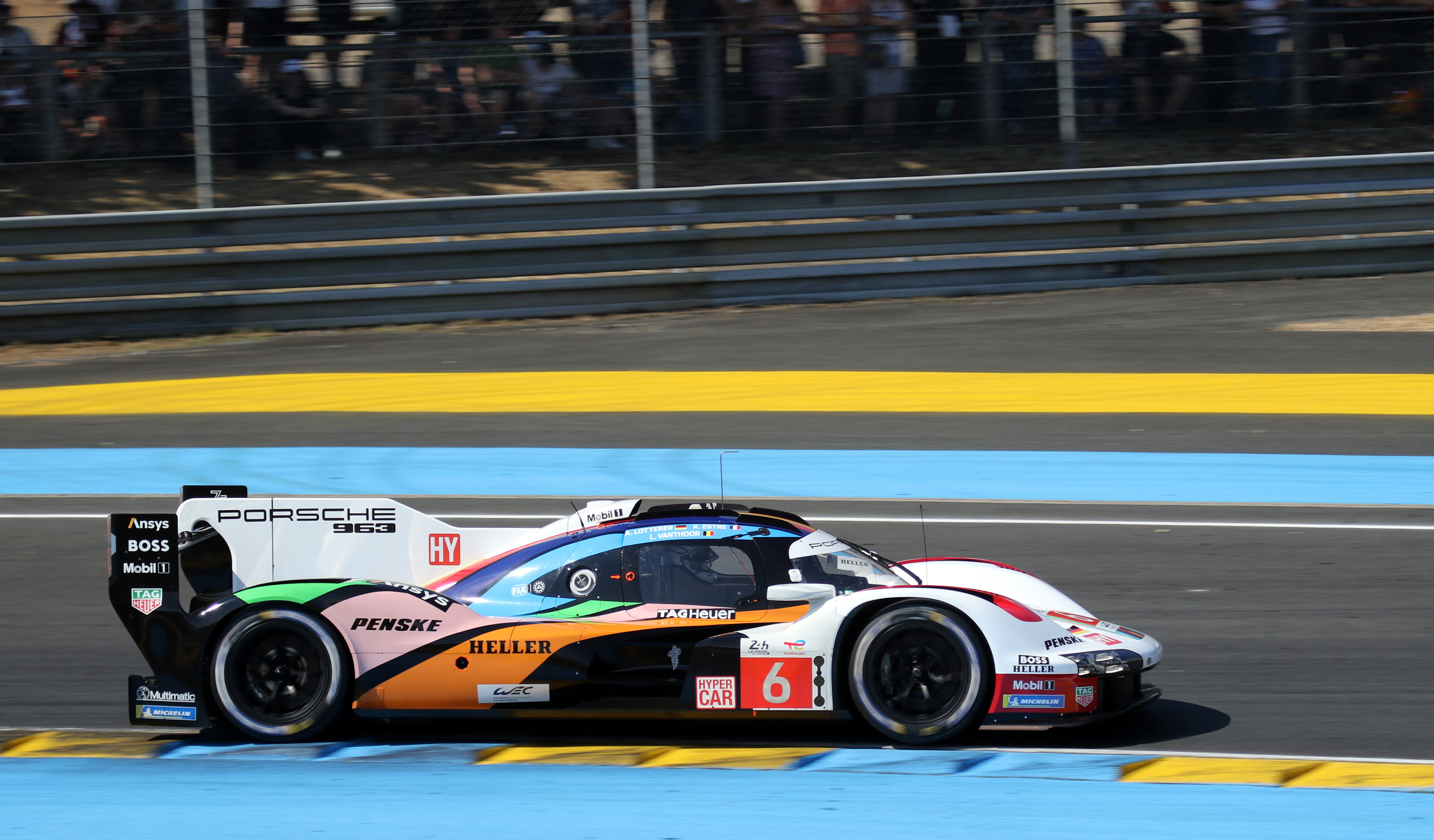
Lotterer at the 2023 24 Hours of Le Mans with the Porsche 963.

Lotterer returned to the series in 2023, joining Porsche's Hypercar effort alongside Kévin Estre and Laurens Vanthoor in the No. 6 entry. After last competing in the series in 2019, Lotterer stated that he felt like "a stranger" after almost four years away. Lotterer won the drivers' championship for the second time in his career in 2024 alongside Estre and Vanthoor, winning for the first time in twelve seasons. In December 2024, Lotterer joined Genesis alongside Pipo Derani to help spearhead the development of their GMR-001 LMDh prototype.

== Single-seater career ==
=== Formula One ===
==== Reserve role at Jaguar (2001–2003) ====
Lotterer tested Jaguar F1 cars from 2000 to 2003. He succeeded in both German and British Formula 3 Championships en route to being named Jaguar Racing's Formula One test driver in 2002. He was passed up for a race seat in 2003 with Eddie Irvine retiring and Pedro de la Rosa leaving, as the team chose Mark Webber and Antônio Pizzonia instead.

In 2002, Lotterer contested a one-off Champ Car event at the end of 2002 for Dale Coyne Racing, scoring a point at the Autódromo Hermanos Rodríguez Circuit.

==== Return with Caterham (2014) ====
Lotterer replaced Caterham F1 driver Kamui Kobayashi for a one-off race at the 2014 Belgian Grand Prix. He qualified 21st place, in front of teammate Marcus Ericsson, but his race lasted just one lap before a mechanical failure put an abrupt end to his F1 debut. He was invited to race again at the Italian Grand Prix, but declined as the team planned to run Roberto Merhi in the car for the first practice session, contrary to his desire to take part in all the available running due to his lack of experience.

=== CART and Formula 3000 ===
Lotterer made a one-off appearance with Dale Coyne Racing in the final round of the 2002 CART Season in Mexico. He finished 12th, scoring a solitary point.

Lotterer also took part in a non-championship F3000 event, the Euro F3000 Sprint, at the Bologna Motor Show in December 2002. He drove for the Uboldi Corse SRL team. In a field of twelve identical Lola B99/50-Zyteks, Lotterer was one of only three non-Italians (the others being Sven Heidfeld and Phil Giebler), and the only one to reach the Semi-Finals. He won the event after beating Fabrizio Gollin in the Final.

=== Formula Nippon/Super Formula ===
Lotterer hoped to progress to either CART or F3000 full-time for 2003 but ended up switching to Formula Nippon. He would become a mainstay of the series until 2017, scoring 24 wins and securing the 2011 title.

=== A1 Grand Prix ===
Lotterer made a one-off appearance for Team Germany in Portugal in the final season of A1 Grand Prix. He retired from the Sprint race and finished ninth in the Feature race, scoring the only points of the season for the former series Champions.

=== Formula E ===
==== Techeetah (2017–2019) ====
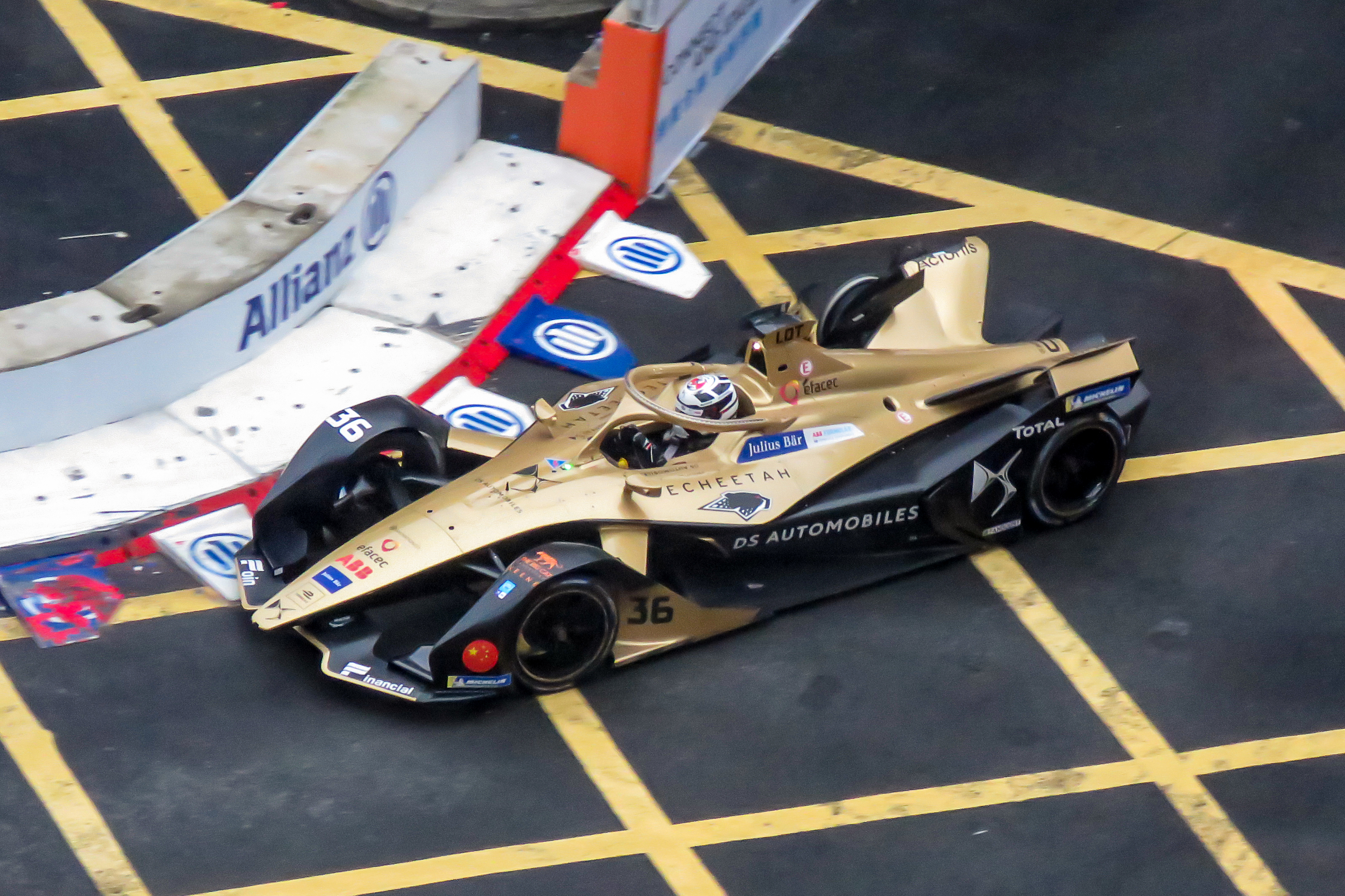
Lotterer with Techeetah during the 2019 Hong Kong ePrix where he would narrowly miss the victory.

Lotterer joined Formula E with Techeetah in 2017, partnering Jean-Éric Vergne. After a disastrous Hong Kong weekend, where he was disqualified in race 1 and finished 13th in race 2 and a forgettable Marrakesh, Lotterer made his first podium in 2018 Santiago ePrix after battling with his teammate Vergne. They helped the team achieve the first 1-2 finish for a team in Formula E, although during the race it looked as though they could have blown it. A charging Lotterer drove into the back of Vergne late in the race and the team were not aware due to a power issue in the paddock. He finished third in 2018 Rome ePrix. He finished the 2017–18 season eighth with 64 points.

Lotterer nearly won the 2019 Hong Kong ePrix after leading most laps in the race. He was hit by Sam Bird in the second last lap which lead to his puncture and caused him to finish the race in 14th. In 2019 Rome ePrix he claimed his first pole position in Formula E. He finished the race second after Jaguar's Mitch Evans. The season finished with four consecutive races without points, ending the season eighth with 86 points, while his team-mate Jean-Éric Vergne won the championship for a second year.

==== Porsche (2019–2022) ====
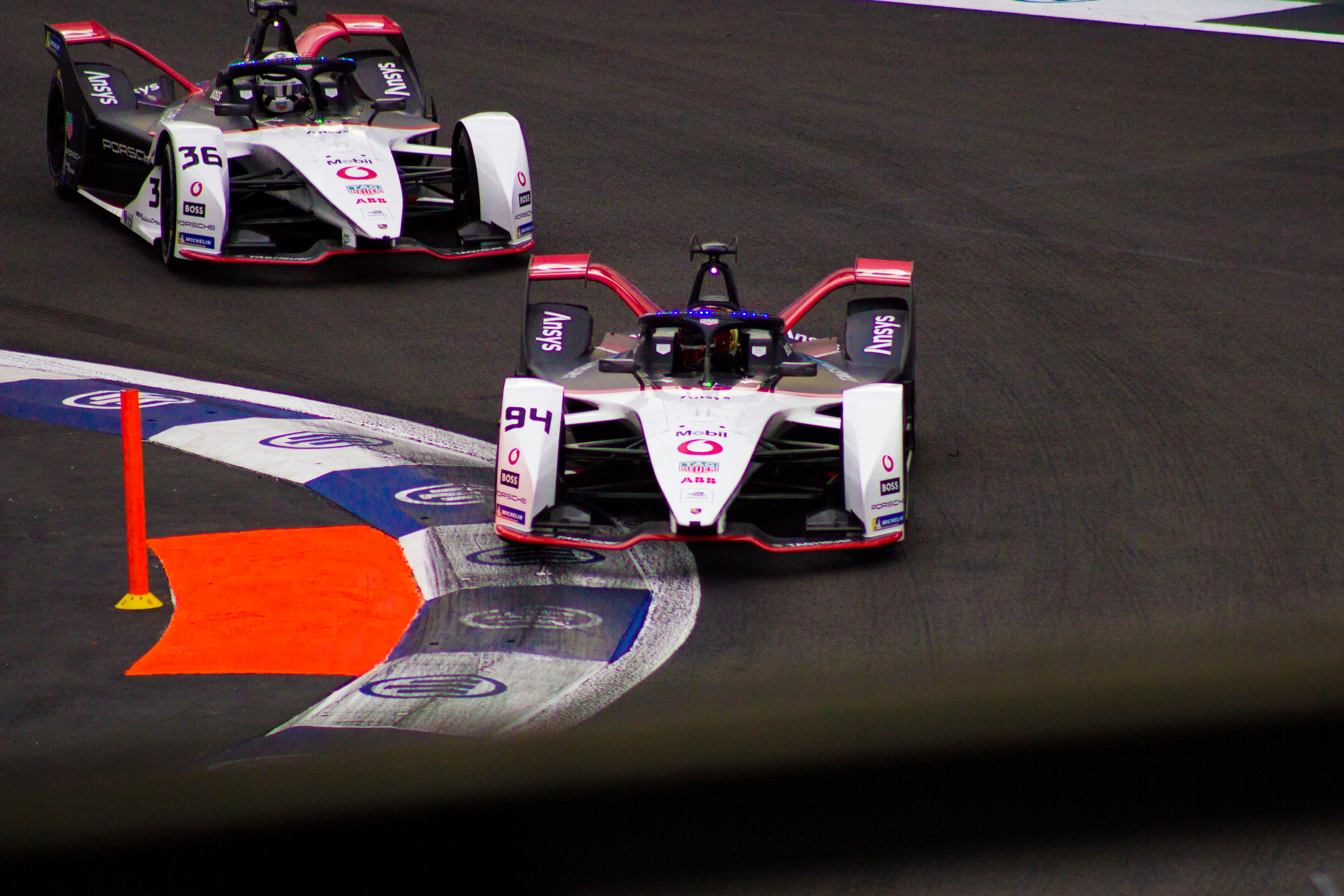
Lotterer behind teammate Pascal Wehrlein, where they secured a 1-2 finish in the 2022 Mexico City ePrix.

Lotterer joined newcomer team TAG Heuer Porsche Formula E Team on 17 July 2019, partnering Neel Jani. António Félix da Costa was announced as his replacement at Techeetah. He made his debut with Porsche at Diriyah finishing second in round 1, and finishing 14th in round 2. Lotterer secured pole for the Mexico City E-Prix, although lost the lead into the first corner and later on retired from the race. Lotterer scored a second place finish in the first of six races in Berlin, and ended the season in eighth with 71 points.

Lotterer stayed with Porsche for season 7 and his only podium finish was in the second race in Valencia, which was a second place. Both of the Porsche drivers were disqualified from the first race in Puebla after the team didn't declare the race tyres. Lotterer had finished in 16th, although his team-mate Wehrlein had crossed the finish line first. Lotterer finished the season in 17th with 58 points.

After ten races, Lotterer had a second place in Mexico City and is currently seventh with 59 points.

==== Andretti (2023) ====
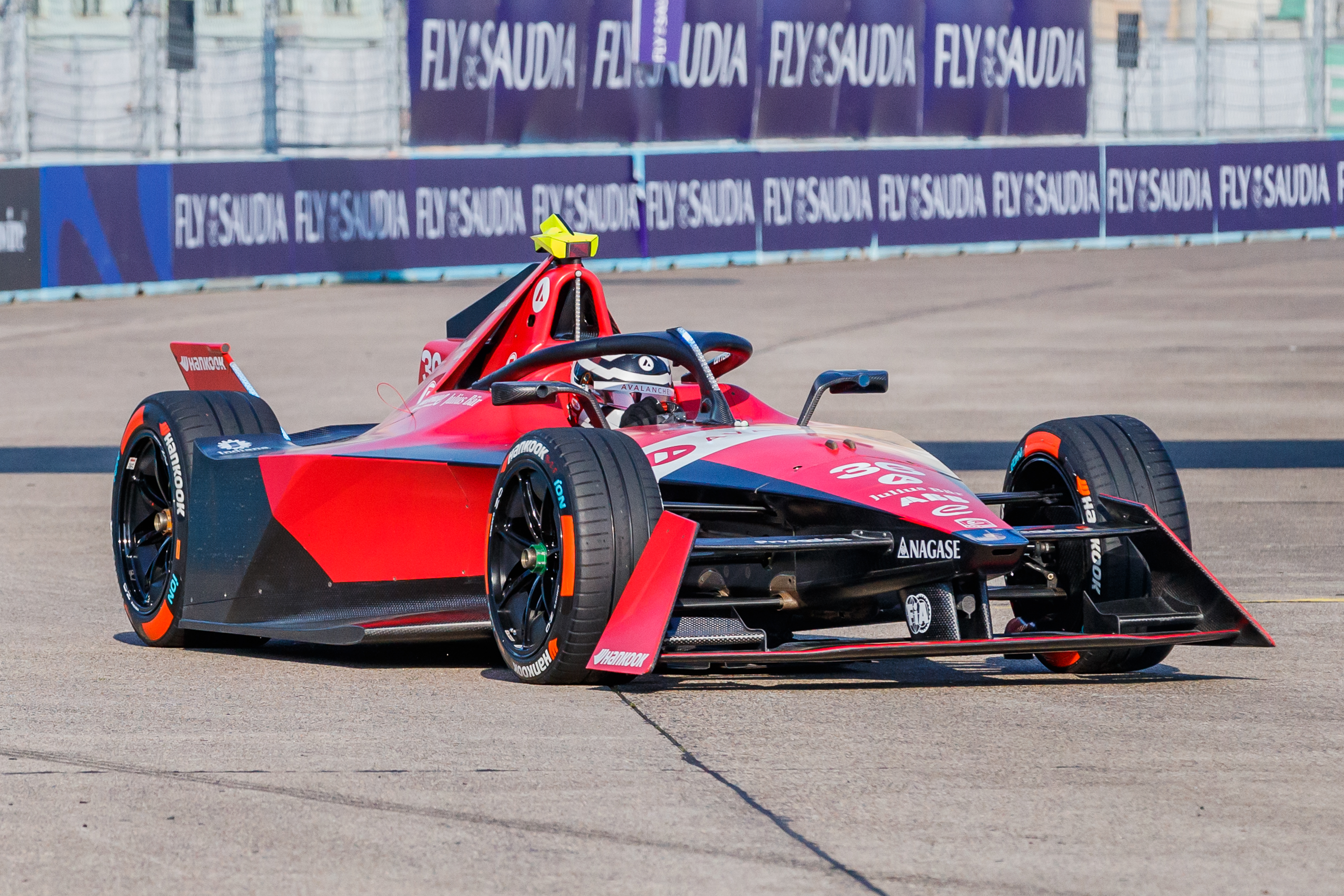
Lotterer during the 2023 Berlin ePrix with Avalanche Andretti.

Lotterer was set to depart Formula E at the end of the 2021–22 season. However, he instead signed with Andretti Autosport's Formula E Team, Avalanche Andretti, to partner Jake Dennis and replace the outgoing Oliver Askew. Lotterer finished the season in a disappointing 18th place, scoring only 23 points, a far cry from teammate Dennis' 229 who became that season's champion. On 8 September, Lotterer announced his exit from the series, stating he would focus solely on the FIA World Endurance Championship.

==== Reserve role with Porsche (2024) ====
Despite leaving Formula E full-time, Lotterer continued his involvement in the series, returning to TAG Heuer Porsche Formula E Team as their test and reserve driver.

== Personal life ==
As of 2004, Lotterer resided in Tokyo, Japan. He has since moved to Monaco and often visits Nivelles, Belgium, the town he was raised in, as well as his hometown Renningen. Lotterer's hobbies outside of racing include cycling, collecting and driving classic cars, photography, driving buggies, and discovering unique foods. Lotterer is close friends with Jean-Éric Vergne, his teammate from 2017 to 2019, and is also friends with former racing driver - turned Audi Sport ABT Schaffler team principal, Allan McNish.

== Racing record ==
=== Career summary ===
| Season | Series | Team | Races | Wins | Poles | F/Laps | Podiums | Points | Position |
|---|---|---|---|---|---|---|---|---|---|
| 1998 | Formula BMW Junior | | 20 | 14 | ? | ? | ? | 318 | **1st** |
| 1999 | Formula BMW ADAC | BMW Rookie Team | 18 | 15 | 9 | ? | 15 | 324 | **1st** |
| 1999 | Eurocup Formula Renault | RC Motorsport | 9 | 1 | ? | ? | ? | 86 | 5th |
| 2000 | German Formula 3 Championship | Opel Team BSR | 20 | 3 | 1 | 2 | 7 | 151 | 4th |
| 2000 | FIA European Formula Three Cup | Opel Team BSR | 1 | 0 | 0 | 0 | 0 | N/A | 8th |
| 2001 | Formula One | Jaguar Racing F1 Team | Test driver | | | | | | |
| 2001 | British Formula 3 Championship | Jaguar Junior Team | 25 | 1 | 3 | 1 | 5 | 143 | 7th |
| 2001 | Masters of Formula 3 | Jaguar Racing | 1 | 0 | 0 | 0 | 1 | N/A | **2nd** |
| 2002 | Formula One | Jaguar Racing F1 Team | Test driver | | | | | | |
| 2002 | FIA GT Championship - N-GT | Freisinger Motorsport | 1 | 0 | 0 | 0 | 1 | 9 | 19th |
| 2002 | CART | Dale Coyne Racing | 1 | 0 | 0 | 0 | 0 | 1 | 22nd |
| 2003 | Formula Nippon | Nakajima Racing | 10 | 0 | 1 | 0 | 3 | 22 | 5th |
| 2003 | JGTC | Nakajima Racing | 5 | 0 | 0 | 0 | 1 | 19 | 16th |
| 2004 | Formula Nippon | Nakajima Racing | 9 | 2 | 1 | 1 | 4 | 33 | **2nd** |
| 2004 | JGTC | Nakajima Racing | 7 | 1 | 0 | 0 | 1 | 42 | 8th |
| 2005 | Formula Nippon | Nakajima Racing | 9 | 2 | 0 | 0 | 2 | 20 | 4th |
| 2005 | Super GT | Nakajima Racing | 8 | 0 | 1 | 0 | 1 | 38 | 9th |
| 2006 | Formula Nippon | TOM'S Racing | 9 | 2 | 0 | 0 | 3 | 30 | **3rd** |
| 2006 | Super GT | Toyota Team TOM'S | 9 | 1 | 0 | 0 | 3 | 80 | **1st** |
| 2007 | Formula Nippon | TOM'S Racing | 9 | 1 | 0 | 1 | 3 | 37 | 5th |
| 2007 | Super GT | Toyota Team TOM'S | 9 | 1 | 0 | 0 | 1 | 54 | 6th |
| 2008 | Formula Nippon | Petronas Team TOM'S | 11 | 0 | 0 | 0 | 4 | 49 | **3rd** |
| 2008 | Super GT | Toyota Team TOM'S | 9 | 0 | 0 | 0 | 4 | 63 | **3rd** |
| 2008–09 | A1 Grand Prix | A1 Team Germany | 2 | 0 | 0 | 0 | 0 | 2 | 21st |
| 2009 | 24 Hours of Le Mans | Kolles | 1 | 0 | 0 | 0 | 0 | N/A | 7th |
| 2009 | Formula Nippon | Petronas Team TOM'S | 8 | 1 | 0 | 0 | 4 | 39 | **3rd** |
| 2009 | Super GT | Lexus Team TOM'S | 9 | 1 | 0 | 0 | 5 | 88 | **1st** |
| 2010 | 24 Hours of Le Mans | Audi Sport Team Joest | 1 | 0 | 0 | 0 | 1 | N/A | **2nd** |
| 2010 | Formula Nippon | Petronas Team TOM'S | 8 | 1 | 0 | 0 | 7 | 43 | **2nd** |
| 2010 | Super GT | Lexus Team TOM'S | 7 | 1 | 0 | 0 | 3 | 62 | **2nd** |
| 2011 | 24 Hours of Le Mans | Audi Sport Team Joest | 1 | 1 | 0 | 0 | 1 | N/A | **1st** |
| 2011 | Formula Nippon | Petronas Team TOM'S | 6 | 5 | 2 | 1 | 6 | 56 | **1st** |
| 2011 | Super GT | Lexus Team TOM'S | 8 | 0 | 0 | 0 | 0 | 39 | 8th |
| 2011 | 24 Hours of Nürburgring - SP8 | Gazoo Racing | 1 | 0 | 0 | 0 | 0 | N/A | 11th |
| 2012 | FIA World Endurance Championship | Audi Sport Team Joest | 8 | 3 | 3 | 1 | 7 | 172.5 | **1st** |
| 2012 | 24 Hours of Le Mans | Audi Sport Team Joest | 1 | 1 | 1 | 0 | 1 | N/A | **1st** |
| 2012 | Formula Nippon | Petronas Team TOM'S | 8 | 2 | 1 | 0 | 3 | 38 | 4th |
| 2012 | Blancpain Endurance Series | Audi Sport Team Phoenix | 1 | 0 | 0 | 0 | 0 | 10 | 21st |
| 2013 | FIA World Endurance Championship | Audi Sport Team Joest | 8 | 3 | 3 | 4 | 6 | 149.25 | **2nd** |
| 2013 | 24 Hours of Le Mans | Audi Sport Team Joest | 1 | 0 | 0 | 1 | 0 | N/A | 5th |
| 2013 | Super Formula | Petronas Team TOM'S | 4 | 2 | 0 | 2 | 4 | 37 | **2nd** |
| 2013 | Blancpain Endurance Series | Belgian Audi Club WRT | 1 | 0 | 0 | 0 | 1 | 21 | 18th |
| 2014 | FIA World Endurance Championship | Audi Sport Team Joest | 8 | 2 | 0 | 2 | 2 | 127 | **2nd** |
| 2014 | 24 Hours of Le Mans | Audi Sport Team Joest | 1 | 1 | 0 | 1 | 1 | N/A | **1st** |
| 2014 | Super Formula | Petronas Team TOM'S | 8 | 2 | 3 | 1 | 4 | 34.5 | **3rd** |
| 2014 | FFSA GT Championship | Belgian Audi Club Team WRT | 2 | 1 | 0 | 0 | 1 | 0 | NC |
| 2014 | Blancpain Endurance Series | Belgian Audi Club Team WRT | 1 | 0 | 0 | 0 | 0 | 12 | 18th |
| 2014 | Formula One | Caterham F1 Team | 1 | 0 | 0 | 0 | 0 | 0 | NC |
| 2015 | FIA World Endurance Championship | Audi Sport Team Joest | 8 | 2 | 0 | 2 | 8 | 161 | **2nd** |
| 2015 | 24 Hours of Le Mans | Audi Sport Team Joest | 1 | 0 | 0 | 1 | 1 | N/A | **3rd** |
| 2015 | Super Formula | Petronas Team TOM'S | 8 | 3 | 2 | 1 | 3 | 40 | **3rd** |
| 2015 | Blancpain Endurance Series | Phoenix Racing | 1 | 0 | 0 | 0 | 0 | 13 | 19th |
| 2016 | FIA World Endurance Championship | Audi Sport Team Joest | 9 | 0 | 3 | 0 | 3 | 104 | 5th |
| 2016 | 24 Hours of Le Mans | Audi Sport Team Joest | 1 | 0 | 0 | 0 | 0 | N/A | 4th |
| 2016 | Super Formula | VANTELIN Team TOM'S | 9 | 0 | 0 | 1 | 3 | 30 | **2nd** |
| 2017 | FIA World Endurance Championship | Porsche LMP Team | 9 | 0 | 3 | 1 | 7 | 129 | 4th |
| 2017 | 24 Hours of Le Mans | Porsche LMP Team | 1 | 0 | 0 | 0 | 0 | N/A | DNF |
| 2017 | Super Formula | Vantelin Team TOM's | 7 | 1 | 1 | 0 | 3 | 20 | 6th |
| 2017 | Blancpain GT Series Endurance Cup | Audi Sport Team WRT | 1 | 0 | 0 | 0 | 0 | 0 | NC |
| 2017 | Intercontinental GT Challenge | Audi Sport Team WRT | 1 | 0 | 0 | 0 | 0 | 0 | NC |
| 2017–18 | Formula E | Techeetah | 12 | 0 | 0 | 1 | 2 | 64 | 8th |
| 2018 | 24 Hours of Le Mans | Rebellion Racing | 1 | 0 | 0 | 0 | 0 | N/A | 4th |
| 2018 | 24 Hours of Nürburgring - SP9 | KÜS Team75 Bernhard | 1 | 0 | 0 | 0 | 0 | N/A | 19th |
| 2018–19 | Formula E | DS Techeetah Formula E Team | 13 | 0 | 1 | 2 | 2 | 86 | 8th |
| 2018–19 | FIA World Endurance Championship | Rebellion Racing | 7 | 0 | 0 | 0 | 2 | 91 | 5th |
| 2019 | 24 Hours of Le Mans | Rebellion Racing | 1 | 0 | 0 | 0 | 0 | N/A | 4th |
| 2019–20 | Formula E | TAG Heuer Porsche Formula E Team | 11 | 0 | 1 | 0 | 2 | 71 | 8th |
| 2020–21 | Formula E | TAG Heuer Porsche Formula E Team | 15 | 0 | 0 | 0 | 1 | 58 | 17th |
| 2021–22 | Formula E | TAG Heuer Porsche Formula E Team | 16 | 0 | 0 | 0 | 1 | 63 | 12th |
| 2022–23 | Formula E | Avalanche Andretti Formula E | 14 | 0 | 0 | 1 | 0 | 23 | 18th |
| 2023 | FIA World Endurance Championship - Hypercar | Porsche Penske Motorsport | 7 | 0 | 0 | 0 | 2 | 71 | 6th |
| 2023 | 24 Hours of Le Mans - Hypercar | Porsche Penske Motorsport | 1 | 0 | 0 | 0 | 0 | N/A | 11th |
| 2023–24 | Formula E | TAG Heuer Porsche Formula E Team | Reserve driver | | | | | | |
| 2024 | FIA World Endurance Championship - Hypercar | Porsche Penske Motorsport | 8 | 2 | 1 | 0 | 5 | 152 | **1st** |
| 2025 | 24 Hours of Le Mans - LMP2 | IDEC Sport | 1 | 0 | 0 | 0 | 0 | 0 | DNF |
| 2026 | FIA World Endurance Championship - Hypercar | Genesis Magma Racing | 8 | 0 | 1 | 0 | 0 | 11 | 20th |

=== Complete German Formula Three Championship results ===
(key) (Races in bold indicate pole position; races in italics indicate fastest lap)

| Year | Entrant | Chassis | Engine | 1 | 2 | 3 | 4 | 5 | 6 | 7 | 8 | 9 | 10 | 11 | 12 | 13 | 14 | 15 | 16 | 17 | 18 | 19 | 20 | DC | Points |
|---|---|---|---|---|---|---|---|---|---|---|---|---|---|---|---|---|---|---|---|---|---|---|---|---|---|
| 2000 | Opel Team BSR | Dallara F399 | Opel | ZOL; 1; 3 | ZOL; 2 Ret | HOC1; 1; 1 | HOC1; 2; 1 | **OSC1**; **1**; 1 | OSC1; 2; 4 | NOR; 1; 14 | NOR; 2; 13 | SAC; 1; 6 | SAC; 2; 7 | NÜR1; 1; 5 | NÜR1; 2; 2 | LAU; 1; 12 | LAU; 2; 2 | OSC2; 1; 6 | OSC2; 2 Ret | NÜR2; 1; 3 | NÜR2; 2; 25 | HOC2; 1 Ret | HOC2; 2 Ret | 4th | 151 |

=== Complete British Formula Three Championship results ===
(key) (Races in bold indicate pole position; races in italics indicate fastest lap)

| Year | Entrant | Chassis | Engine | 1 | 2 | 3 | 4 | 5 | 6 | 7 | 8 | 9 | 10 | 11 | 12 | 13 | 14 | 15 | 16 | 17 | 18 | 19 | 20 | 21 | 22 | 23 | 24 | 25 | 26 | 27 | DC | Points |
|---|---|---|---|---|---|---|---|---|---|---|---|---|---|---|---|---|---|---|---|---|---|---|---|---|---|---|---|---|---|---|---|---|
| 2001 | Jaguar Junior Team | Dallara F301 | Mugen-Honda | SIL1; 1 Ret | SIL1; 2; 9 | SNE; 1; 7 | SNE; 2; 9 | **DON**; **1**; 2 | **DON**; **2**; 1 | OUL; 1 Ret | OUL; 2; 16 | CRO; 1; 6 | CRO; 2; 7 | ROC; 1; 5 | ROC; 2; 3 | CAS; 1; 6 | CAS; 2; 6 | BRH1; 1; 3 | BRH1; 2; 7 | DON; 1; 2 | DON; 2; 4 | KNO; 1 Ret | KNO; 2 C | THR; 1; 8 | THR; 2; 13 | THR; 3; 7 | BRH2; 1 DNS | BRH2; 2; 6 | **SIL2**; **1**; 20 | SIL2; 2; 8 | 7th | 143 |

=== Complete CART/Champ Car results ===
(key) (Races in bold indicate pole position; races in italics indicate fastest lap)

| Year | Team | No. | Chassis | Engine | 1 | 2 | 3 | 4 | 5 | 6 | 7 | 8 | 9 | 10 | 11 | 12 | 13 | 14 | 15 | 16 | 17 | 18 | 19 | Rank | Points | Ref |
|---|---|---|---|---|---|---|---|---|---|---|---|---|---|---|---|---|---|---|---|---|---|---|---|---|---|---|
| 2002 | Dale Coyne Racing | 19 | Lola B02/00 | Ford XF V8 t | MTY | LBH | MOT | MIL | LS | POR | CHI | TOR | CLE | VAN | MDO | ROA | MTL | DEN | ROC | MIA | SRF | FON | MXC; 12 | **22nd** | **1** | |

=== Complete Formula Nippon/Super Formula results ===
(key) (Races in bold indicate pole position; races in italics indicate fastest lap)

| Year | Team | Engine | 1 | 2 | 3 | 4 | 5 | 6 | 7 | 8 | 9 | 10 | 11 | DC | Points |
|---|---|---|---|---|---|---|---|---|---|---|---|---|---|---|---|
| 2003 | Nakajima Racing | Mugen | SUZ; 2 | FUJ; 4 | MIN; 7 | MOT; 6 | SUZ; Ret | **SUG**; 2 | FUJ; 3 | MIN; 9 | MOT; 5 | SUZ; Ret | | 5th | 22 |
| 2004 | Nakajima Racing | Mugen | SUZ; 2 | SUG; 4 | MOT; 1 | SUZ; 8 | SUG; Ret | MIN; Ret | **SEP**; 1 | MOT; 3 | SUZ; 7 | | | 2nd | 33 |
| 2005 | Nakajima Racing | Mugen | MOT; 11 | SUZ; Ret | SUG; 9 | FUJ; Ret | SUZ; Ret | MIN; 10 | FUJ; 1 | MOT; Ret | SUZ; 1 | | | 4th | 20 |
| 2006 | TOM'S Racing | Toyota | FUJ; 8 | SUZ; 5 | MOT; 1 | SUZ; 5 | AUT; 8 | FUJ; 2 | SUG; Ret | MOT; Ret | SUZ; 1 | | | 3rd | 30 |
| 2007 | TOM'S Racing | Toyota | FUJ; Ret | SUZ; 5 | MOT; 2 | OKA; Ret | SUZ; 13 | FUJ; 1 | SUG; 7 | MOT; 4 | SUZ; 2 | | | 5th | 37 |
| 2008 | Petronas Team TOM'S | Toyota | FUJ; Ret | SUZ; 3 | MOT; 2 | OKA; 2 | SUZ; 2 | SUZ; 4 | MOT; 11 | MOT; 7 | FUJ; 5 | FUJ; 4 | SUG; 12 | 3rd | 49 |
| 2009 | Petronas Team TOM'S | Toyota | FUJ; 10 | SUZ; 3 | MOT; 5 | FUJ; 8 | SUZ; 7 | MOT; 1 | AUT; 2 | SUG; 2 | | | | 3rd | 39 |
| 2010 | Petronas Team TOM'S | Toyota | SUZ; 3 | MOT; 3 | FUJ; 2 | MOT; Ret | SUG; 3 | AUT; 1 | SUZ; 3 | SUZ; 2 | | | | 2nd | 43 |
| 2011 | Petronas Team TOM'S | Toyota | SUZ; 1 | AUT | FUJ; 1 | MOT; 2 | SUZ; C | SUG; 1 | **MOT**; 1 | **MOT**; 1 | | | | 1st | 56 |
| 2012 | Petronas Team TOM'S | Toyota | SUZ; 5 | **MOT**; 1 | AUT; Ret | FUJ; 1 | MOT; 2 | SUG; 10 | SUZ; 5 | SUZ; 8 | | | | 4th | 38 |
| 2013 | Petronas Team TOM'S | Toyota | SUZ | **AUT**; 1 | FUJ; 1 | MOT; 2 | SUG; 2 | SUZ | SUZ | | | | | 2nd | 37 |
| 2014 | Petronas Team TOM'S | Toyota | **SUZ**; 6 | FUJ; 4 | **FUJ**; 1 | FUJ; 6 | MOT | AUT; 1 | SUG; Ret | **SUZ**; 3 | SUZ; 2 | | | 3rd | 34.5 |
| 2015 | Petronas Team TOM'S | Toyota | SUZ; 1 | OKA; 8 | FUJ; 5 | MOT; 4 | AUT; 11 | **SUG**; 1 | **SUZ**; 1 | SUZ; Ret | | | | 3rd | 40 |
| 2016 | Vantelin Team TOM'S | Toyota | SUZ; 7 | OKA; 8 | FUJ; 4 | MOT; 2 | OKA; 12 | OKA; 4 | SUG; 5 | SUZ; 2 | SUZ; 2 | | | 2nd | 30 |
| 2017 | Vantelin Team TOM's | Toyota | SUZ; 5 | OKA; 1 | OKA; 3 | FUJ; 3 | MOT; 7 | AUT; Ret | SUG; 10 | **SUZ**; C | SUZ; C | | | 6th | 21 |

=== Complete JGTC/Super GT results ===
(key) (Races in bold indicate pole position; races in italics indicate fastest lap)

| Year | Team | Car | Class | 1 | 2 | 3 | 4 | 5 | 6 | 7 | 8 | 9 | DC | Points |
|---|---|---|---|---|---|---|---|---|---|---|---|---|---|---|
| 2003 | Nakajima Racing | Honda NSX | GT500 | TAI | FUJ | SUG | FUJ; 13 | FUJ; 9 | MOT; Ret | AUT; 2 | SUZ; 12 | | 16th | 19 |
| 2004 | Nakajima Racing | Honda NSX | GT500 | TAI; 10 | SUG; 4 | SEP; 9 | TOK; 6 | MOT; 1 | AUT; 12 | SUZ; 5 | | | 8th | 42 |
| 2005 | Nakajima Racing | Honda NSX | GT500 | OKA; 5 | FUJ; 8 | SEP; 5 | SUG; 13 | MOT; 10 | **FUJ**; 2 | AUT; 14 | SUZ; 10 | | 9th | 38 |
| 2006 | Toyota Team TOM'S | Lexus SC430 | GT500 | SUZ; 1 | OKA; 8 | FUJ; 3 | SEP; 15 | SUG; 4 | SUZ; 10 | MOT; 2 | AUT; 7 | FUJ; 4 | 1st | 80 |
| 2007 | Toyota Team TOM'S | Lexus SC430 | GT500 | SUZ; 7 | OKA; 5 | FUJ; DNS | SEP; 8 | SUG; 5 | SUZ; 1 | MOT; 6 | AUT; 6 | FUJ; 6 | 6th | 54 |
| 2008 | Toyota Team TOM'S | Lexus SC430 | GT500 | SUZ; 3 | OKA; 4 | FUJ; 2 | SEP; 7 | SUG; 10 | SUZ; 3 | MOT; 3 | AUT; 8 | FUJ; 7 | 3rd | 63 |
| 2009 | Lexus Team TOM'S | Lexus SC430 | GT500 | OKA; 11 | SUZ; 2 | FUJ; 2 | SEP; 6 | SUG; 7 | SUZ; 8 | FUJ; 3 | AUT; 1 | MOT; 2 | 1st | 88 |
| 2010 | Lexus Team TOM'S | Lexus SC430 | GT500 | SUZ; 4 | OKA; 3 | FUJ; 2 | SEP; 8 | SUG; 7 | SUZ; 10 | FUJ; C | MOT; 1 | | 2nd | 62 |
| 2011 | Lexus Team TOM'S | Lexus SC430 | GT500 | OKA; 4 | FUJ; 4 | SEP; 6 | SUG; 9 | SUZ; 6 | FUJ; 15 | AUT; 4 | MOT; 8 | | 8th | 39 |

=== Complete 24 Hours of Le Mans results ===
| Year | Team | Co-Drivers | Car | Class | Laps | Pos. | Class Pos. |
|---|---|---|---|---|---|---|---|
| 2009 | (Germany) ByKolles | (Netherlands) Charles Zwolsman Jr. (India) Narain Karthikeyan | Audi R10 TDI | LMP1 | 369 | 7th | 7th |
| 2010 | (Germany) Audi Sport Team Joest | (Switzerland) Marcel Fässler (France) Benoît Tréluyer | Audi R15 TDI plus | LMP1 | 396 | **2nd** | **2nd** |
| 2011 | (Germany) Audi Sport Team Joest | (Switzerland) Marcel Fässler (France) Benoît Tréluyer | Audi R18 TDI | LMP1 | 355 | **1st** | **1st** |
| 2012 | (Germany) Audi Sport Team Joest | (Switzerland) Marcel Fässler (France) Benoît Tréluyer | Audi R18 e-tron quattro | LMP1 | 378 | **1st** | **1st** |
| 2013 | (Germany) Audi Sport Team Joest | (Switzerland) Marcel Fässler (France) Benoît Tréluyer | Audi R18 e-tron quattro | LMP1 | 338 | 5th | 5th |
| 2014 | (Germany) Audi Sport Team Joest | (Switzerland) Marcel Fässler (France) Benoît Tréluyer | Audi R18 e-tron quattro | LMP1-H | 379 | **1st** | **1st** |
| 2015 | (Germany) Audi Sport Team Joest | (Switzerland) Marcel Fässler (France) Benoît Tréluyer | Audi R18 e-tron quattro | LMP1 | 393 | **3rd** | **3rd** |
| 2016 | (Germany) Audi Sport Team Joest | (Switzerland) Marcel Fässler (France) Benoît Tréluyer | Audi R18 | LMP1 | 367 | 4th | 4th |
| 2017 | (Germany) Porsche LMP Team | (Switzerland) Neel Jani (United Kingdom) Nick Tandy | Porsche 919 Hybrid | LMP1 | 318 | DNF | DNF |
| 2018 | (Switzerland) Rebellion Racing | (Switzerland) Neel Jani (Brazil) Bruno Senna | Rebellion R13-Gibson | LMP1 | 375 | 4th | 4th |
| 2019 | (Switzerland) Rebellion Racing | (Switzerland) Neel Jani (Brazil) Bruno Senna | Rebellion R13-Gibson | LMP1 | 376 | 4th | 4th |
| 2023 | (Germany) Porsche Penske Motorsport | (France) Kévin Estre (Belgium) Laurens Vanthoor | Porsche 963 | Hypercar | 320 | 22nd | 11th |
| 2024 | (Germany) Porsche Penske Motorsport | (France) Kévin Estre (Belgium) Laurens Vanthoor | Porsche 963 | Hypercar | 311 | 4th | 4th |
| 2025 | (France) IDEC Sport | (United Kingdom) Jamie Chadwick (France) Mathys Jaubert | Oreca 07-Gibson | LMP2 | 206 | DNF | DNF |
| 2026 | (South Korea) Genesis Magma Racing | (Brazil) Pipo Derani (France) Mathys Jaubert | Genesis GMR-001 | Hypercar | 263 | DNF | DNF |

=== Complete FIA World Endurance Championship results ===
(key) (Races in bold indicate pole position; races in italics indicate fastest lap)

| Year | Entrant | Class | Chassis | Engine | 1 | 2 | 3 | 4 | 5 | 6 | 7 | 8 | 9 | Rank | Points |
|---|---|---|---|---|---|---|---|---|---|---|---|---|---|---|---|
| 2012 | Audi Sport Team Joest | LMP1 | Audi R18 e-tron quattro | Audi TDI 3.7 L Turbo V6 (Hybrid Diesel) | **SEB**; 11 | SPA; 2 | **LMS**; 1 | **SIL**; 1 | SÃO; 2 | BHR; 1 | FUJ; 2 | SHA; 3 | | 1st | 172.5 |
| 2013 | Audi Sport Team Joest | LMP1 | Audi R18 e-tron quattro | Audi TDI 3.7 L Turbo V6 (Hybrid Diesel) | SIL; 2 | **SPA**; 1 | LMS; 5 | **SÃO**; 1 | COA; 3 | **FUJ**; 14 | SHA; 1 | BHR; 2 | | 2nd | 149.25 |
| 2014 | Audi Sport Team Joest | LMP1 | Audi R18 e-tron quattro | Audi TDI 4.0 L Turbo V6 (Hybrid Diesel) | SIL; Ret | SPA; 5 | LMS; 1 | COA; 1 | FUJ; 6 | SHA; 4 | BHR; 4 | SÃO; 5 | | 2nd | 127 |
| 2015 | Audi Sport Team Joest | LMP1 | Audi R18 e-tron quattro | Audi TDI 4.0 L Turbo V6 (Hybrid Diesel) | SIL; 1 | SPA; 1 | LMS; 3 | NÜR; 3 | COA; 2 | FUJ; 3 | SHA; 3 | BHR; 2 | | 2nd | 161 |
| 2016 | Audi Sport Team Joest | LMP1 | Audi R18 | Audi TDI 4.0 L Turbo V6 (Hybrid Diesel) | **SIL**; EX | SPA; 5 | LMS; 4 | **NÜR**; 3 | MEX; 2 | **COA**; 6 | FUJ; Ret | SHA; 6 | BHR; 2 | 5th | 104 |
| 2017 | Porsche LMP Team | LMP1 | Porsche 919 Hybrid | Porsche 2.0 L Turbo V4 (Hybrid) | SIL; 3 | **SPA**; 4 | LMS; Ret | NÜR; 2 | MEX; 2 | **COA**; 2 | FUJ; 3 | SHA; 3 | **BHR**; 3 | 4th | 129 |
| 2018–19 | Rebellion Racing | LMP1 | Rebellion R13 | Gibson GL458 4.5 L V8 | SPA; DSQ | LMS; 4 | SIL; 2 | FUJ; 3 | SHA; 4 | SEB | SPA; 5 | LMS; 4 | | 5th | 91 |
| 2023 | Porsche Penske Motorsport | Hypercar | Porsche 963 | Porsche 4.6 L Turbo V8 | SEB; 6 | ALG; 3 | SPA; Ret | LMS; 8 | MNZ; 7 | FUJ; 3 | BHR; 5 | | | 6th | 71 |
| 2024 | Porsche Penske Motorsport | Hypercar | Porsche 963 | Porsche 4.6 L Turbo V8 | QAT; 1 | IMO; 2 | SPA; 2 | **LMS**; 4 | SÃO; 2 | COA; 6 | FUJ; 1 | BHR; 10 | | 1st | 152 |
| 2026 | Genesis Magma Racing | Hypercar | Genesis GMR-001 | Genesis G8MR 3.2 L Turbo V8 | IMO; 15 | SPA; 8 | LMS; Ret | SÃO; 15 | COA; 7 | FUJ; 15 | **CAT**; 16 | MNZ; 13 | | 20th | 11 |

=== Complete Formula One results ===
(key) (Races in bold indicate pole position; races in italics indicate fastest lap)

| Year | Entrant | Chassis | Engine | 1 | 2 | 3 | 4 | 5 | 6 | 7 | 8 | 9 | 10 | 11 | 12 | 13 | 14 | 15 | 16 | 17 | 18 | 19 | WDC | Points |
|---|---|---|---|---|---|---|---|---|---|---|---|---|---|---|---|---|---|---|---|---|---|---|---|---|
| 2014 | Caterham F1 Team | Caterham CT05 | Renault Energy F1‑2014 1.6 V6 t | AUS | MAL | BHR | CHN | ESP | MON | CAN | AUT | GBR | GER | HUN | BEL; Ret | ITA | SIN | JPN | RUS | USA | BRA | ABU | NC | 0 |

=== Complete Formula E results ===
(key) (Races in bold indicate pole position; races in italics indicate fastest lap)

| Year | Team | Chassis | Powertrain | 1 | 2 | 3 | 4 | 5 | 6 | 7 | 8 | 9 | 10 | 11 | 12 | 13 | 14 | 15 | 16 | Pos | Points |
|---|---|---|---|---|---|---|---|---|---|---|---|---|---|---|---|---|---|---|---|---|---|
| 2017–18 | Techeetah | Spark SRT01-e | Renault Z.E. 17 | HKG; DSQ | HKG; 13 | MRK; Ret | SCL; 2 | MEX; 13 | PDE; 12 | RME; 3 | PAR; 6 | BER; 9 | ZUR; 4 | NYC; 7 | NYC; 9 | | | | | 8th | 64 |
| 2018–19 | DS Techeetah | Spark SRT05e | DS E-TENSE FE19 | ADR; 5 | MRK; 6 | SCL; 13 | MEX; 5 | HKG; 14 | SYX; 4 | **RME**; 2 | PAR; 2 | MCO; 7 | BER; Ret | BRN; 14 | NYC; 17 | NYC; Ret | | | | 8th | 86 |
| 2019–20 | TAG Heuer Porsche Formula E Team | Spark SRT05e | Porsche 99X Electric | DIR; 2 | DIR; 14 | SCL; DSQ | **MEX**; Ret | MRK; 8 | BER; 2 | BER; 9 | BER; 5 | BER; 8 | BER; 4 | BER; 14 | | | | | | 8th | 71 |
| 2020–21 | TAG Heuer Porsche Formula E Team | Spark SRT05e | Porsche 99X Electric | DIR; 16 | DIR; 11 | RME; 14 | RME; 15 | VLC; Ret | VLC; 2 | MCO; 17 | PUE; DSQ | PUE; 17 | NYC; 8 | NYC; 5 | LDN; 4 | LDN; 17 | BER; 10 | BER; 4 | | 17th | 58 |
| 2021–22 | TAG Heuer Porsche Formula E Team | Spark SRT05e | Porsche 99X Electric | DRH; 13 | DRH; 4 | MEX; 2 | RME; 10 | RME; 4 | MCO; Ret | BER; 4 | BER; 8 | JAK; 9 | MRK; 15 | NYC; 16 | NYC; 9 | LDN; 12 | LDN; 12 | SEO; Ret | SEO; Ret | 12th | 63 |
| 2022–23 | Avalanche Andretti Formula E | Formula E Gen3 | Porsche 99X Electric | MEX; 4 | DRH; 9 | DRH; 12 | HYD; 9 | CAP; 9 | SAP; 12 | BER; 8 | BER; 21 | MCO; Ret | JAK | JAK | POR; 19 | RME; Ret | RME; Ret | LDN; 13 | LDN; 21 | 18th | 23 |

Sporting positions
| Preceded by Stefan Mücke | Formula BMW ADAC; Champion; 1999 | Succeeded by Hannes Lachinger |
| Preceded by Yuji Tachikawa; Toranosuke Takagi | Super GT; GT500 Champion; 2006; With: Juichi Wakisaka | Succeeded by Daisuke Itō; Ralph Firman |
| Preceded by Satoshi Motoyama; Benoît Tréluyer | Super GT; GT500 Champion; 2009; With: Juichi Wakisaka | Succeeded by Takashi Kogure; Loïc Duval |
| Preceded by Timo Bernhard; Romain Dumas; Mike Rockenfeller | Winner of the 24 Hours of Le Mans; 2011–2012; With: Benoît Tréluyer & Marcel Fässler | Succeeded by Allan McNish; Tom Kristensen; Loïc Duval |
| Preceded by João Paulo de Oliveira | Formula Nippon; Champion; 2011 | Succeeded by Kazuki Nakajima |
| Preceded by Inaugural | FIA World Endurance Champion; 2012; With: Benoît Tréluyer & Marcel Fässler | Succeeded by Allan McNish; Tom Kristensen; Loïc Duval |
| Preceded by Allan McNish; Tom Kristensen; Loïc Duval | Winner of the 24 Hours of Le Mans; 2014; With: Benoît Tréluyer & Marcel Fässler | Succeeded by Earl Bamber; Nico Hülkenberg; Nick Tandy |
| Preceded by Sébastien Buemi; Brendon Hartley; Ryo Hirakawa | World Endurance Championship; Champion; 2024; With: Kévin Estre & Laurens Vanthoor | Succeeded by James Calado; Antonio Giovinazzi; Alessandro Pier Guidi |
