= Jonathan Cochet =

French racing driver

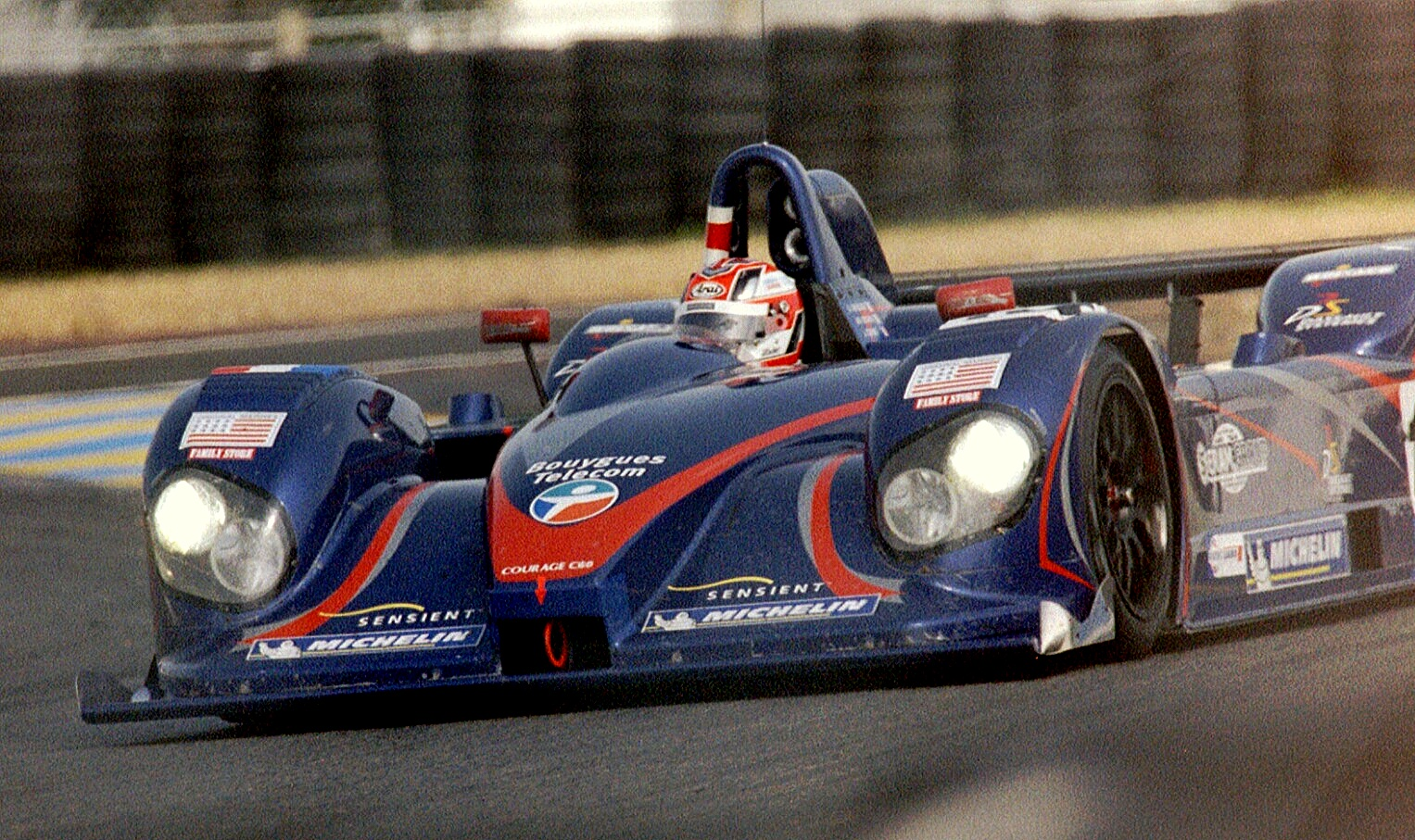
- Cochet's Courage in 2003.
- Nationality: (France) French
- Born: 4 January 1977 (age 49) Alençon (France)
- Relatives: Louis Cochet (nephew)
- Categorisation: FIA Gold (until 2019); FIA Silver (2020–)

Championship titles
- 2001 2000 2000 2000 1997: Korea Super Prix; Masters of Formula 3 Pau Grand Prix; French Formula 3 French Formula Renault

Jonathan Cochet (born 4 January 1977 in Alençon, France) is a French former racing driver. A national champion at Formula Renault and Formula 3 level, he notably won the Pau Grand Prix and Marlboro Masters in 2000. He was test driver for Prost Grand Prix in 2001 and the Renault F1 Team in 2006, and often raced for Courage Compétition in the Le Mans Series.

In 2020, upon being downgraded to Silver by the FIA, Cochet was contacted by LMP2 outfit G-Drive Racing for a possible return.

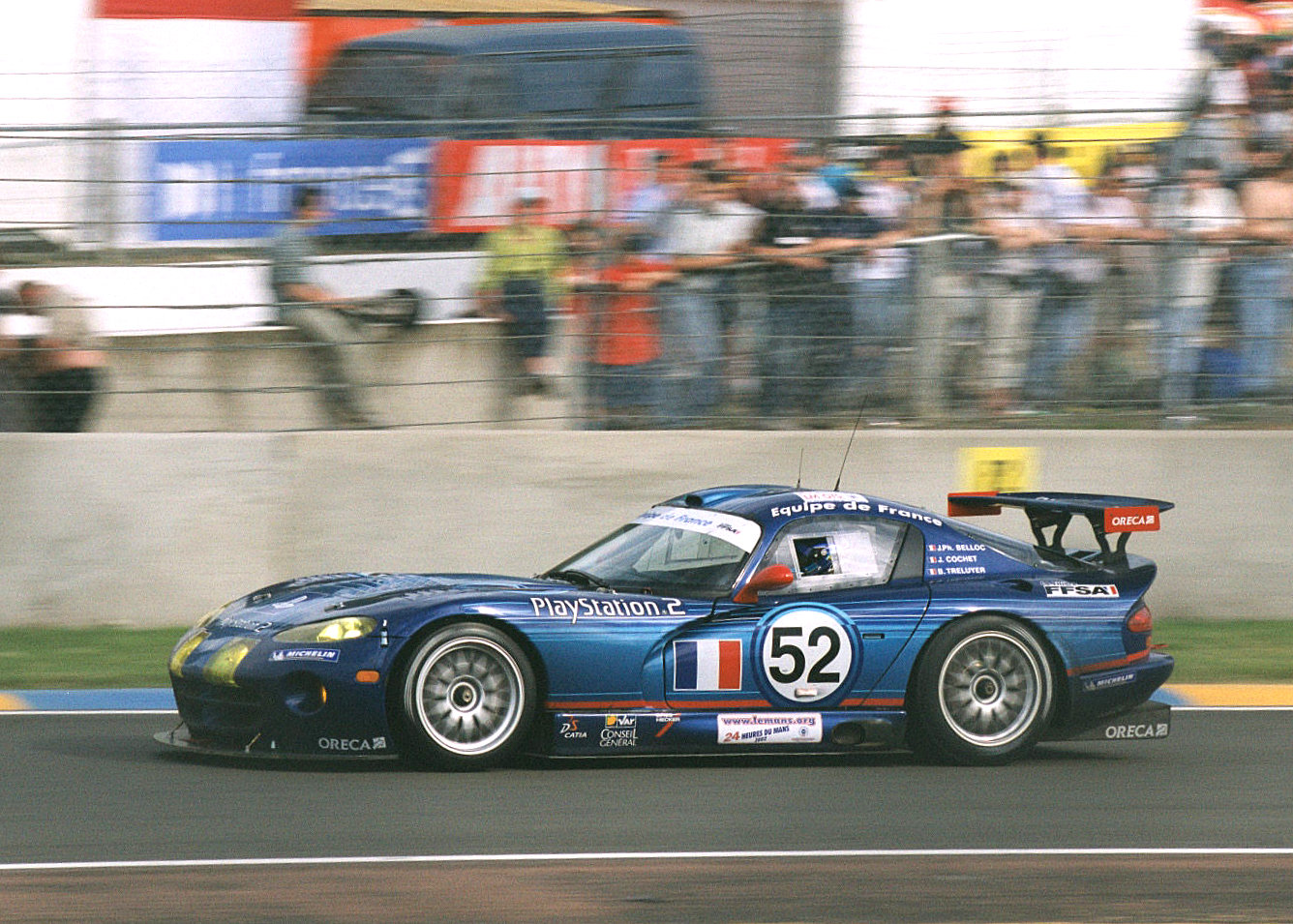
The PlayStation-liveried Oreca Chrysler Viper which Cochet drove to the podium at the 2002 24 Hours of Le Mans.

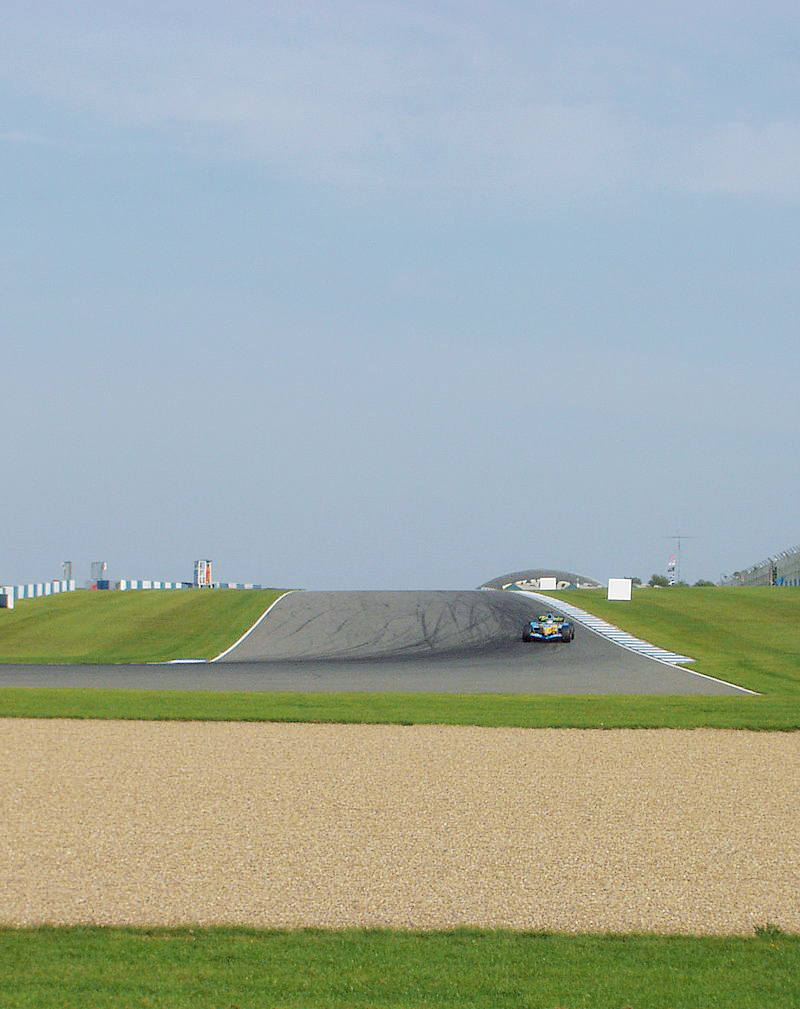
Cochet testing a Renault R25 around Donington Park in 2006.

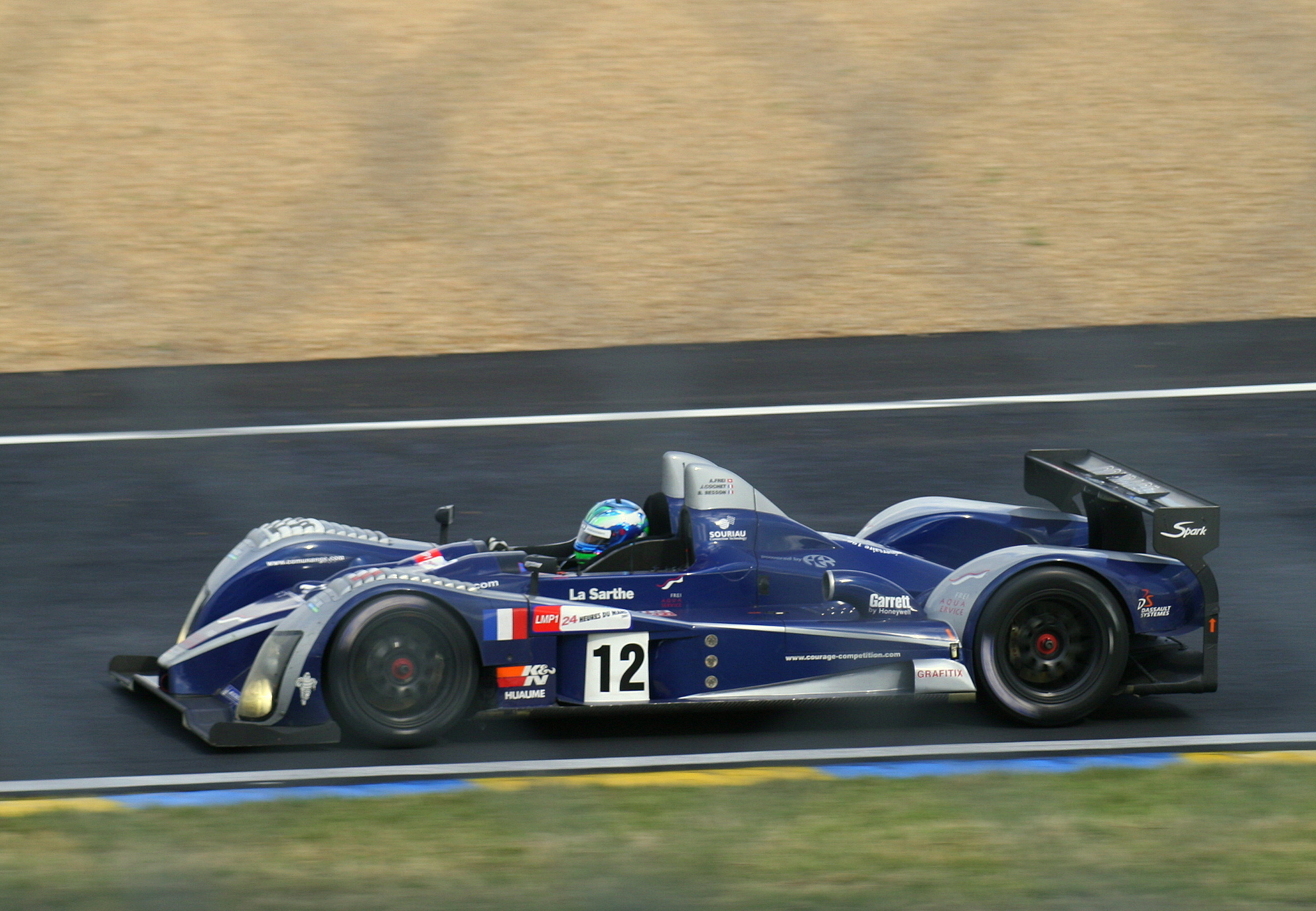
Cochet's Courage LMP1 in 2007.

== Racing record ==
=== Career summary ===
Season	Series	Team	Races	Wins	Poles	F/Laps	Podiums	Points	Position
1995	French Formula Renault Campus	Elf La Filière	?	1	?	?	?	207	5th
1996	French Formula Renault 2.0	Elf La Filière	16	0	1	0	0	15	14th
1997	French Formula Renault 2.0	Elf La Filière	18	4	5	7	9	173	**1st**
1997	Eurocup Formula Renault	Elf La Filière	?	1	?	?	?	30	9th
1998	French Formula 3 Championship	La Filière Elf	20	0	0	0	0	39	11th
1999	French Formula 3 Championship	Signature	20	0	0	0	0	39	11th
1999	Pau Grand Prix	Signature	1	0	0	0	0	N/A	4th
1999	Macau Grand Prix	Signature	1	0	0	0	0	N/A	DNF
1999	Korea Super Prix	Signature	1	0	0	0	0	N/A	4th
2000	French Formula 3 Championship	Signature	12	4	7	3	8	162.5	**1st**
2000	Pau Grand Prix	Signature	1	1	1	1	1	N/A	**1st**
2000	Masters of Formula 3	Signature	1	1	1	1	1	N/A	**1st**
2000	Macau Grand Prix	Promatecme	1	0	0	0	0	N/A	11th
2000	Korea Super Prix	Promatecme	1	0	0	0	0	N/A	DNF
2001	International Formula 3000 Championship	F3000 Prost Junior Team	4	0	0	0	0	0	23rd
2001	Open Telefónica by Nissan	Venturini Racing	6	0	0	1	2	51	9th
2001	24 Hours of Le Mans - LMGTS	Équipe de France FFSA	1	0	0	0	0	N/A	DNF
2001	Macau Grand Prix	Signature	1	0	0	0	0	N/A	DNF
2001	Korea Super Prix	Signature	1	1	1	1	1	N/A	**1st**
2001	Formula One	Prost Acer	Test driver						
2002	World Series by Nissan	GD Racing	4	0	0	0	0	30	13th
2002	World Series by Nissan	KTR	2	0	0	0	0	30	13th
2002	Formula Nippon	DoCoMo Team Dandelion Racing	2	0	0	0	0	0	19th
2002	24 Hours of Le Mans - LMGTS	Équipe de France FFSA	1	0	0	0	1	N/A	**3rd**
2003	World Series by Nissan	GD Racing	2	0	0	0	0	0	28th
2003	24 Hours of Le Mans - LMP900	Courage Compétition	1	0	0	0	0	N/A	5th
2004	Le Mans Endurance Series - LMP2	Courage Compétition	1	1	1	1	1	10	11th
2005	Le Mans Endurance Series - LMP1	Courage Compétition	3	0	0	0	0	5	20th
2005	24 Hours of Le Mans - LMP1	Courage Compétition	1	0	0	0	0	N/A	DNF
2005	Rolex Sports Car Series - DP	Tuttle Team Racing / SAMAX	2	0	0	0	0	41	52nd
2006	Rolex Sports Car Series - DP	Tuttle Team Racing / SAMAX	10	0	0	0	0	113	41st
2006	Rolex Sports Car Series - DP	Derhaag Motorsports	1	0	0	0	0	113	41st
2006	Formula One	Mild Seven Renault F1 Team	Test driver						
2007	Le Mans Series - LMP1	Courage Compétition	5	0	0	0	0	5	18th
2007	24 Hours of Le Mans - LMP1	Courage Compétition	1	0	0	0	0	N/A	9th
2007	Rolex Sports Car Series - DP	SunTrust Racing	3	0	0	0	2	90	37th
2007–08	A1 Grand Prix	A1 Team France	2	0	0	0	0	118†	4th†
2009	FIA GT3 European Championship	Reiter Engineering	7	0	0	0	0	0	NC
2009	Lamborghini Super Trofeo - Pro	AutoVitesse	10	1	0	0	4	73	4th
2014	FFSA GT Championship	Autovitesse	2	0	0	0	0	0	NC†
2023	Ultimate Cup Series - Endurance GT Touring Challenge - 3A	AB Sport Auto	2	0	1	2	2	45	10th
2026	McLaren Trophy Europe	Autovitesse							

† Team standings

=== 24 Hours of Le Mans results ===
Year	Team	Co-Drivers	Car	Class	Laps	Pos.	Class Pos.
2001	Equipe de France FFSA; Epsilon Sport; Oreca	(France) David Terrien (France) Jean-Philippe Dayraut	Chrysler Viper GTS-R	GTS	4	DNF	DNF
2002	Equipe de France FFSA; Oreca	(France) Benoît Tréluyer (France) Jean-Philippe Belloc	Chrysler Viper GTS-R	GTS	326	14th	**3rd**
2003	(France) Courage Compétition	(France) Stéphane Grégoire (France) Jean-Marc Gounon	Courage C60-Judd	LMP900	360	7th	5th
2005	(France) Courage Compétition	(Japan) Shinji Nakano (France) Bruce Jouanny	Courage C60H-Judd	LMP1	52	DNF	DNF
2007	(France) Courage Compétition	(Switzerland) Alexander Frei (France) Bruno Besson	Courage LC70-AER	LMP1	304	26th	9th

=== Complete International Formula 3000 results ===
(key) (Races in bold indicate pole position) (Races in italics indicate fastest lap)

Year	Entrant	1	2	3	4	5	6	7	8	9	10	11	12	DC	Points
2001	F3000 Prost Junior Team	INT	IMO	CAT	A1R	MON	NÜR; 16	MAG; 11	SIL; 9	HOC; 15	HUN	SPA	MNZ	23rd	0

=== Complete Formula Nippon results ===
(key) (Races in bold indicate pole position) (Races in italics indicate fastest lap)

Year	Entrant	1	2	3	4	5	6	7	8	9	10	DC	Points
2002	DoCoMo DANDELION	SUZ; 13	FUJ; 8	MIN	SUZ	MOT	SUG	FUJ	MIN	MOT	SUZ	NC	0

Sporting positions
Preceded by Sébastien Enjolras	Championnat de France Formule Renault Champion; 1997	Succeeded by Matthew Davies
Preceded by Benoît Tréluyer	FIA European Formula Three Cup / Pau Grand Prix winner 2000	Succeeded by Anthony Davidson
Preceded by Marc Hynes	Formula Three Masters winner 2000	Succeeded by Takuma Sato
Preceded by Sébastien Bourdais	French Formula Three champion 2000	Succeeded by Ryo Fukuda
