= Korea Super Prix =

- Changwon Street Circuit

Race information
- Circuit length: 3.014 km (1.873 miles)
- Race length: 81.38 km (50.57 miles)
- Laps: 27

Last race (2003)

Pole position
- (United Kingdom) L. Hamilton; Manor Motorsport; 1:09.989

Podium
- 1. (United States) R. Antinucci; Hitech Racing; 27:25.208; 2. (Netherlands) R. Doornbos; Menu Motorsport; + 1.982; 3. (Brazil) N. Piquet Jr.; Hitech Racing; + 2.473

Fastest lap
- (Australia) J. Courtney; TOM's; 1:10.647

Changwon Street Circuit
- Location: Changwon, Gyeongsangnam-do, South Korea
- Coordinates: 35°13′56.83″N 128°39′51.16″E
- Opened: 28 November 1999; 26 years ago
- Closed: 23 November 2003; 22 years ago
- Major events: Korea Super Prix (1999–2003)
- Website: https://web.archive.org/web/20031125132634/http://www.f3korea.net

Super Prix Circuit (1999–2003)
- Length: 3.014 km (1.873 mi)
- Turns: 14
- Race lap record: 1:10.350 ( (Brazil) Nelson Piquet Jr., Dallara F302, 2003, F3)

The International Formula 3 Korea Super Prix was a Formula Three race held annually on the streets of Changwon, South Korea between 1999 and 2003. The event enjoyed brief success as a sister 'flyaway' event to complement the season-ending Macau Grand Prix, before being replaced in 2004 with an ultimately one-off Bahrain Superprix at the Bahrain International Circuit.

The Korea Super Prix was due to make a return in 2010, at the new Korea International Circuit, but this was cancelled due to "a legal technicality with the circuit" which surfaced just a few weeks before the race was due to run.

== Results ==
Year	Winner	Runner-up	Third place	Pole position	Fastest lap
1999	(United Kingdom) Darren Manning	(United Kingdom) Jenson Button	(France) Benoît Tréluyer	(United Kingdom) Darren Manning	(United Kingdom) Darren Manning
2000	(India) Narain Karthikeyan	(Portugal) Tiago Monteiro	(Italy) Gianmaria Bruni	(India) Narain Karthikeyan	(Italy) Gianmaria Bruni
2001	(France) Jonathan Cochet	(United Kingdom) Andy Priaulx	(France) Benoît Tréluyer	(France) Jonathan Cochet	(France) Jonathan Cochet
2002	(France) Olivier Pla	(Japan) Takashi Kogure	(Japan) Kosuke Matsuura	(France) Olivier Pla	(France) Bruce Jouanny
2003	(United States) Richard Antinucci	(Netherlands) Robert Doornbos	(Brazil) Nelson Piquet Jr.	(United Kingdom) Lewis Hamilton	(Australia) James Courtney
2004–2009	event not held				
2010	event cancelled				

Bahrain Superprix

Year	Winner	Runner-up	Third place	Pole position	Fastest lap
2004	(United Kingdom) Lewis Hamilton	(Germany) Nico Rosberg	(United Kingdom) Jamie Green	(United Kingdom) Jamie Green	(United Kingdom) Jamie Green

== See also ==
- 1999 Korea Super Prix
