= French Formula Three Championship =

Former Single-Seater Racing Championship

- Category: Single-seaters
- Country: France
- Inaugural season: 1964
- Folded: 2002
- Last Drivers' champion: (France) Tristan Gommendy
- Last Teams' champion: (France) ASM Formule 3

The French Formula Three Championship was a motor racing series for Formula Three cars held in France between 1964 and 2002. The series was merged with the German Formula Three Championship in 2003 to form the Formula 3 Euro Series.

== Champions ==
Season	Driver	Team	Car
1964	(France) Henri Grandsire	Automobiles Alpine	Alpine-Renault A 270
1965	(France) Jean-Pierre Beltoise	Matra Sports	Matra-Ford MS5
1966	(France) Johnny Servoz-Gavin	Matra Sports	Matra-Ford MS5
1967	(France) Henri Pescarolo	Matra Sports	Matra-Ford MS5
1968	(France) François Cevert	Volant Shell	Tecno-Ford 68
1969	(France) François Mazet	Volant Shell/Lotus Components	Tecno-Ford 69/Lotus-Ford 59
1970	(France) Jean-Pierre Jaussaud	Volant Shell/Winfield	Tecno-Ford/Martini-Ford MK5
1971	(France) Patrick Depailler	Automobiles Alpine	Alpine-Renault A360
1972	(France) Michel Leclère	Automobiles Alpine	Alpine-Renault A364
1973	(France) Jacques Laffite	Oreca	Martini-Ford MK12
1974–1977	Not held		
1978	(France) Alain Prost	Oreca	Martini-Renault MK21B
1978	(France) Jean-Louis Schlesser		Chevron-Toyota B38
1979	(France) Alain Prost	Oreca	Martini-Renault MK27
1980	(France) Alain Ferté	Oreca	Martini-Renault MK27/31
1981	(France) Philippe Streiff	Motul Nogaro	Martini-Alfa Romeo MK34
1982	(France) Pierre Petit	David Price Racing	Ralt-Toyota RT3/Ralt-VW RT3
1983	(France) Michel Ferté	Oreca	Martini-Alfa Romeo MK39
1984	(France) Olivier Grouillard	Oreca	Martini-Alfa Romeo MK42
1985	(France) Pierre-Henri Raphanel	Oreca	Martini-Alfa Romeo MK45
1986	(France) Yannick Dalmas	Oreca	Martini-VW MK49
1987	(France) Jean Alesi	Oreca	Martini-Alfa Romeo MK52/ Dallara-Alfa Romeo 386/Dallara-Alfa Romeo 387
1988	(France) Érik Comas	Oreca	Dallara-Alfa Romeo 388
1989	(France) Jean-Marc Gounon	Oreca	Reynard-Alfa Romeo 893
1990	(France) Éric Hélary	Formula Project	Reynard-Honda 903/Ralt-Honda RT34
1991	(France) Christophe Bouchut	Graff Racing	Ralt-VW RT33
1992	(France) Franck Lagorce	Promatecme	Dallara-Opel 392
1993	(France) Didier Cottaz	Formula Project Equipe	Dallara-Fiat 393
1994	(France) Jean-Philippe Belloc	Winfield	Dallara-Fiat 393
1995	(France) Laurent Redon	Promatecme	Dallara-Fiat 394
1996	(France) Soheil Ayari	Graff Racing	Dallara-Opel 396
1997	(France) Patrice Gay	Graff Racing	Dallara-Opel 396
1998	(Belgium) David Saelens	ASM Formule 3	Dallara-Renault 396
1999	(France) Sébastien Bourdais	La Filiere	Martini-Opel MK79
2000	(France) Jonathan Cochet	Signature	Dallara-Renault 399
2001	(Japan) Ryo Fukuda	Saulnier Racing	Dallara-Renault 399
2002	(France) Tristan Gommendy	ASM Formule 3	Dallara-Renault 302

== See also ==
- Formula 3 Euro Series
- German Formula Three Championship
- Formula Three
- French Formula Renault Championship
