= Peter Sundberg =

Swedish racing driver

Peter Hans Sundberg (born 10 May 1976) is a Swedish car racing driver with titles in several categories. He was born and grew up in the south of Spain, spending his teen years riding motocross.

Sundberg finished near the top of numerous Formula Renault championships, then going into Formula Three where he won the Italian Formula Three Championship in 1999. He competed in the World Cup Formula 3 races in Macau and Korea, and went on to test for the Minardi Formula One team at the end of that year.

Afterwards, Sundberg competed in Spanish F3 and Japanese F3. He competed in the World Series by Nissan in 2002. He was away from racing until 2005 when he entered the Spanish GT Championship and won the title in 2007 and 2008 driving a Ferrari 430 GT2 for team RSV-Motorsport. In 2007 he was teamed up with Domingo Romero, and in 2008 he did the first part of the season with Romero and the second part with Sergio Hernández.

Sporting positions
Preceded by Donny Crevels	Italian Formula Three Champion; 1999	Succeeded by Davide Uboldi
