= Ryō Fukuda =

Japanese racing driver

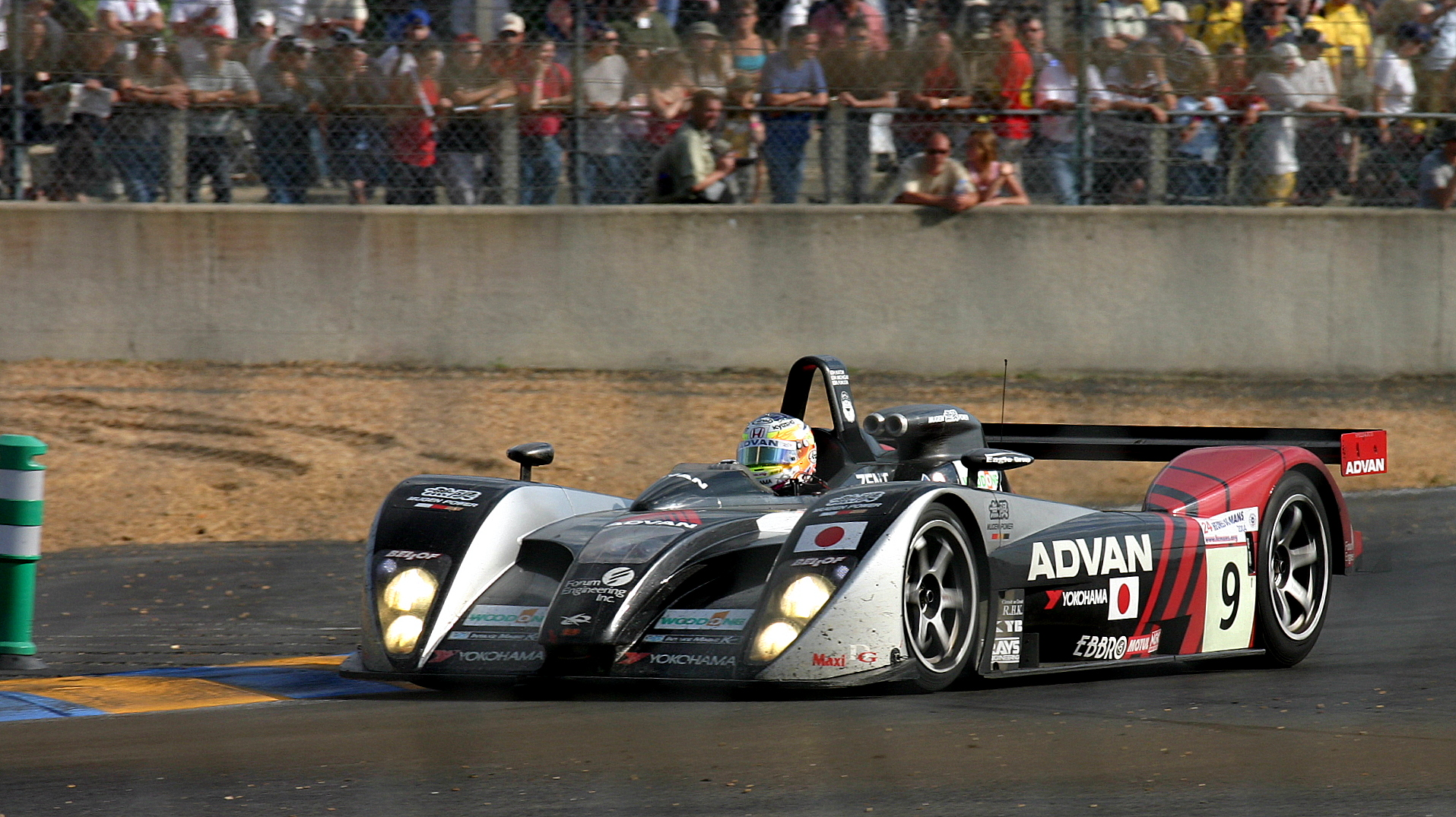
- Fukuda racing Kondo's LMP1 in 2004.
- Nationality: Japan
- Born: 26 June 1979 (age 47) Fukuoka, Japan
- Categorisation: FIA Gold (until 2017); FIA Silver (2018–)

Ryō Fukuda (福田良 Fukada Ryō, born June 26, 1979, in Fukuoka) is a Japanese former racing driver. He was a Formula One test driver. In the 2005–2006 season, he raced in A1 Grand Prix Japan Team.

Fukuda started his career in France, at 1996 in Formula Campus, Formula Renault and Formula 3. In this category, after second place in 2000, in 2001, he became the French Formula Three champion with the Saulnier Racing team. In 2002, he was in Formula One BAR–Honda test driver, and also participated in one race in the Porsche Supercup and FIA GT Championship with Paul Belmondo Racing. Fukuda also participated in Formula Nippon in 2003, World Series by Nissan in 2004, Formula Renault 3.5 Series in 2005 and 2006 with Saulnier Racing and Tech 1 Racing.

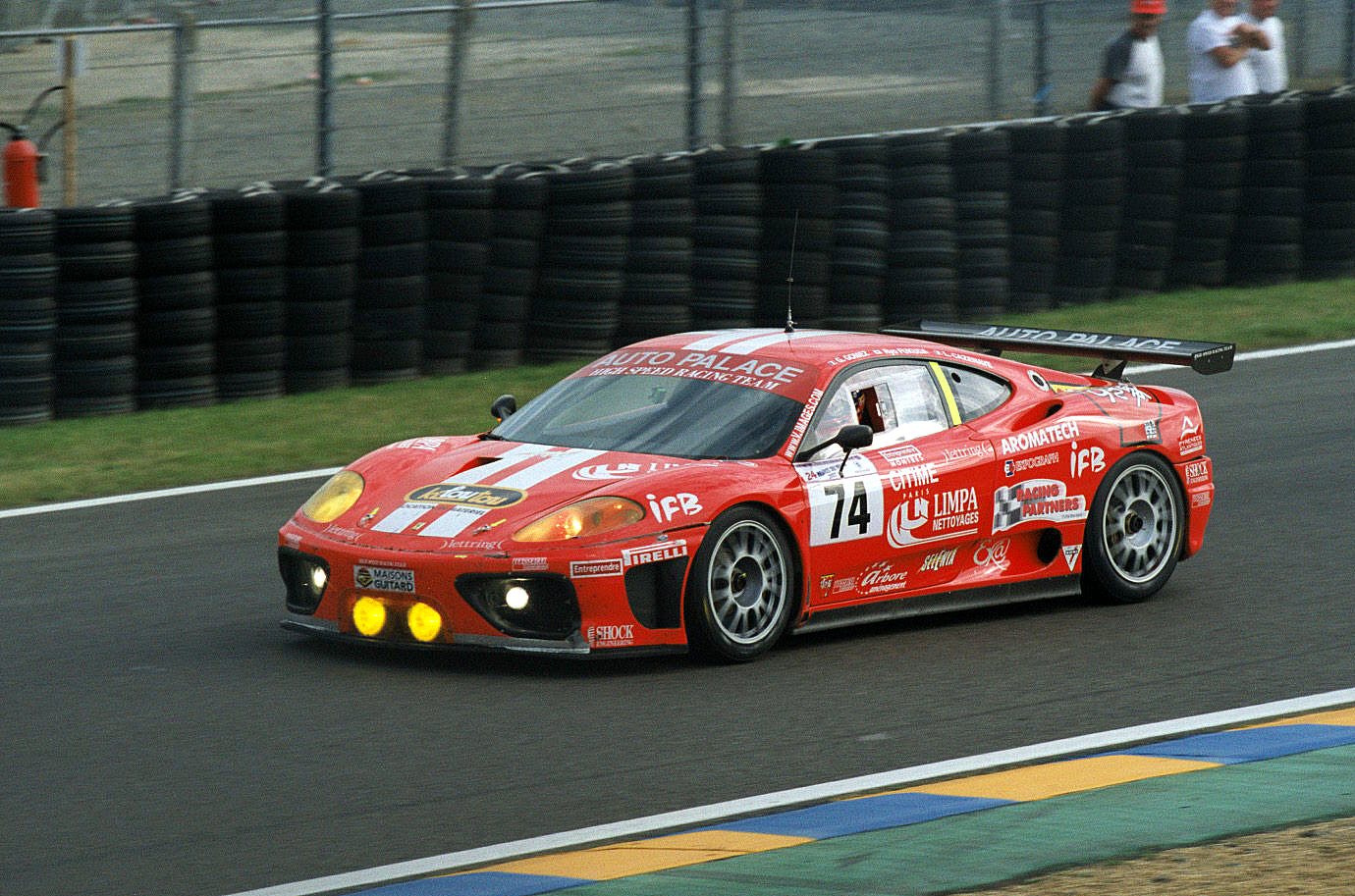
Fukuda on his Le Mans debut in 2002.

== Racing record ==
=== Complete 24 Hours of Le Mans results ===
Year	Team	Co-Drivers	Car	Class	Laps	Pos.	Class Pos.
2002	(France) Auto Palace	(France) Guillaume Gomez (France) Laurent Cazenave	Ferrari 360 Modena GT	GT	119	DNF	DNF
2003	(Japan) Kondo Racing	(Japan) Masahiko Kondo (Japan) Ukyo Katayama	Dome S101-Mugen	LMP900	322	13th	8th
2004	(Japan) Kondo Racing	(Japan) Hiroki Katoh (Japan) Ryo Michigami	Dome S101-Mugen	LMP1	206	DNF	DNF

=== Complete Formula Nippon results ===
(key)

Year	Entrant	1	2	3	4	5	6	7	8	9	10	DC	Points
2003	Team 5Zigen	SUZ; 7	FUJ; Ret	MIN; 6	MOT; Ret	SUZ; 13	SUG	FUJ	MIN	MOT	SUZ	14th	1

=== Complete Formula Renault 3.5 Series results ===
(key)

Year	Entrant	1	2	3	4	5	6	7	8	9	10	11	12	13	14	15	16	17	DC	Points
2005	Saulnier Racing	ZOL; 1; 9	ZOL; 2; 8	MON; 1; 9	VAL; 1; 17	VAL; 2; 9	LMS; 1; 14	LMS; 2; 17	BIL; 1; 9	BIL; 2; 13	OSC; 1; 14	OSC; 2 Ret	DON; 1 Ret	DON; 2; 14	EST; 1; 14	EST; 2; 16	MOZ; 1; 18	MOZ; 2; 19	20th	11
2006	Tech 1 Racing	ZOL; 1; 11	ZOL; 2 Ret	MON; 1; 17	IST; 1; 12	IST; 2; 10	MIS; 1; 12	MIS; 2; 9	SPA; 1; 12	SPA; 2; 13	NÜR; 1; 16	NÜR; 2; 5	DON; 1; 19	DON; 2; 4	LMS; 1 Ret	LMS; 2; 4	CAT; 1 Ret	CAT; 2 Ret	16th	25

Sporting positions
Preceded by Jonathan Cochet	French Formula Three; Champion; 2001	Succeeded by Tristan Gommendy
