= Everything Electric =

Show, podcast, website, and live event about electric vehicles and renewable energy

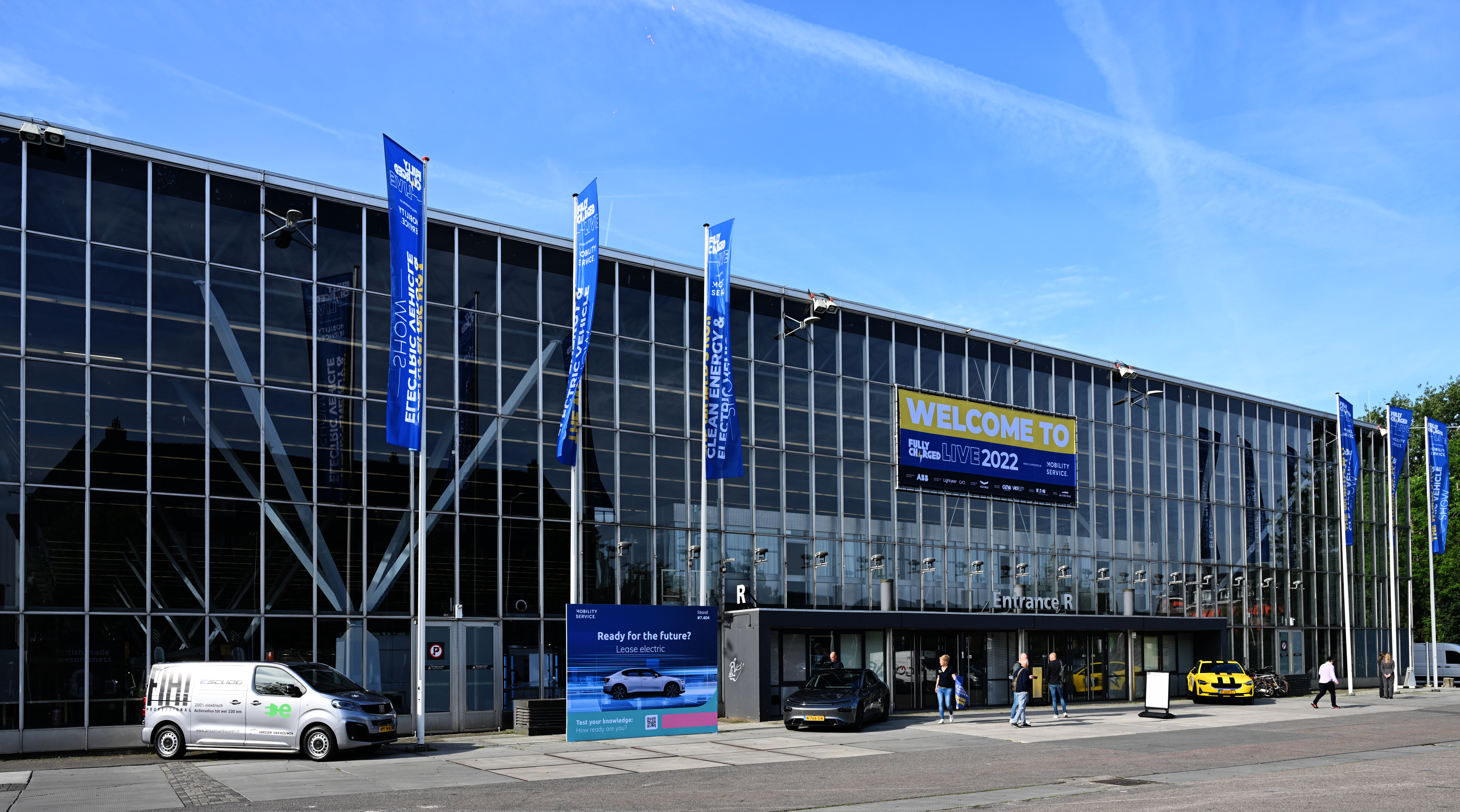

YouTube information
- Channels: Everything Electric CARS; Everything Electric TECH
- Years active: 2010–present
- Genres: Education, Technology
- Subscribers: 1.1 million
- Views: 220+ million
- Last updated: December 2025
- Website: fullycharged.show

Everything Electric (previously "The Fully Charged Show") is a YouTube channel, podcast, website, and live event focusing on electric vehicles and renewable energy founded by writer, broadcaster and actor Robert Llewellyn. Llewellyn later became Joint CEO of Fully Charged with Dan Caesar and Caesar also presents many of the episodes of the show. They are both joined by many regular presenters along with guest presenters from many different countries. The channel has covered a wide range of topics around electric vehicles including electric cars, electric bikes, electric aircraft, and electric vehicle charging infrastructure. Everything Electric also covers a wide range of renewable energy topics including solar power, wind power, UK energy policy, cycling infrastructure, air pollution and air pollution monitoring.

Everything Electric began in 2010 as "Fully Charged" (later "the Fully Charged Show" in 2022) and has since amassed more than 1 million subscribers and over 220 million views as of December 2025 with over 1,000 episodes. (Note: Subscriber numbers and number of channel views only reflect the main channel and do not include the second channel totals.) The channel is viewer supported through the crowdfunding platform Patreon or can be supported through a YouTube channel premium membership which provides access to Fully Charged Plus. The channel was previously supported through advertising and partnerships with Ecotricity, Bosch and British Gas.

Everything Electric also produces a weekly podcast discussing news and current topics not covered by the videos. In May 2019 a second YouTube channel, named Fully Charged Plus (formerly Fully Charged Regen), was launched with the purpose of uploading all the podcast episodes in YouTube video format, and releasing other longer-format videos such as talks and lectures, different from the usual episodes. In October of 2022, the second YouTube channel was renamed to Everything Electric Show with a focus on home energy systems and solutions.

The organization also hosts many live events each year throughout the world. First known as Fully Charged Live, the events later were rebranded as Everything Electric, which is a combination of an all-electric vehicle show and home energy show. Thousands attend these events to learn more about home energy solutions and for the electric vehicle test drives, with some vehicle manufacturers debuting their new electric models to the public for the first time at these shows.

== Presenters ==
The main presenters of Everything Electric include Robert Llewellyn (Founder and Joint CEO), Dan Caesar (Joint CEO), Jack Scarlett, Imogen Bhogal, physicist Helen Czerski, and East Asia correspondent Elliot Richards. Special guest presenters include Andy Torbet, Chelsea Sexton, Maddie Moate, and Ricky Roy along with additional guest presenters from around the world working closely with a production crew of 12 people. Previous regular presenters include former Top Gear presenter Rory Reid and Jonny Smith a former presenter of Fifth Gear.

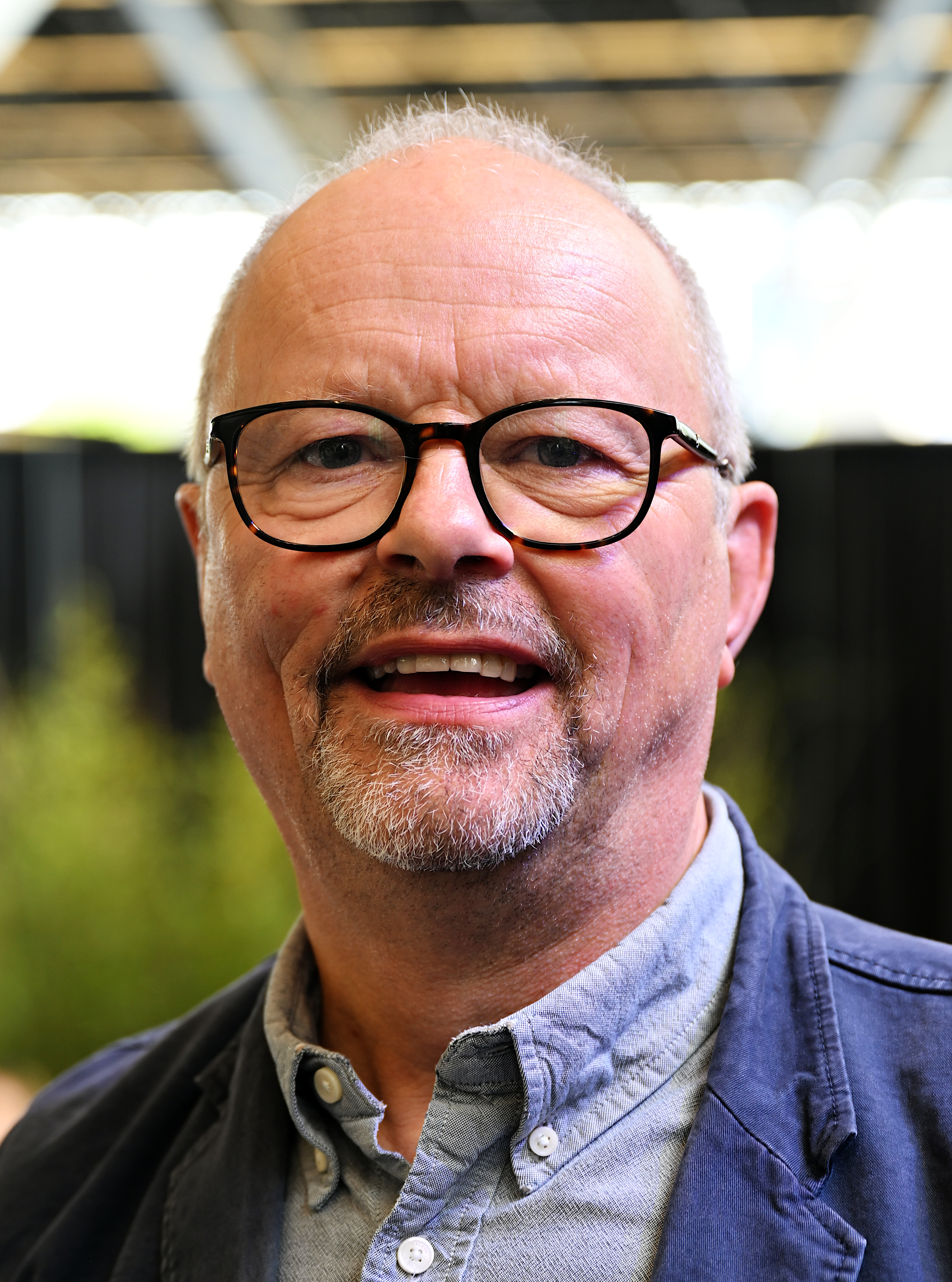
Robert Llewellyn, Founder and Joint CEO

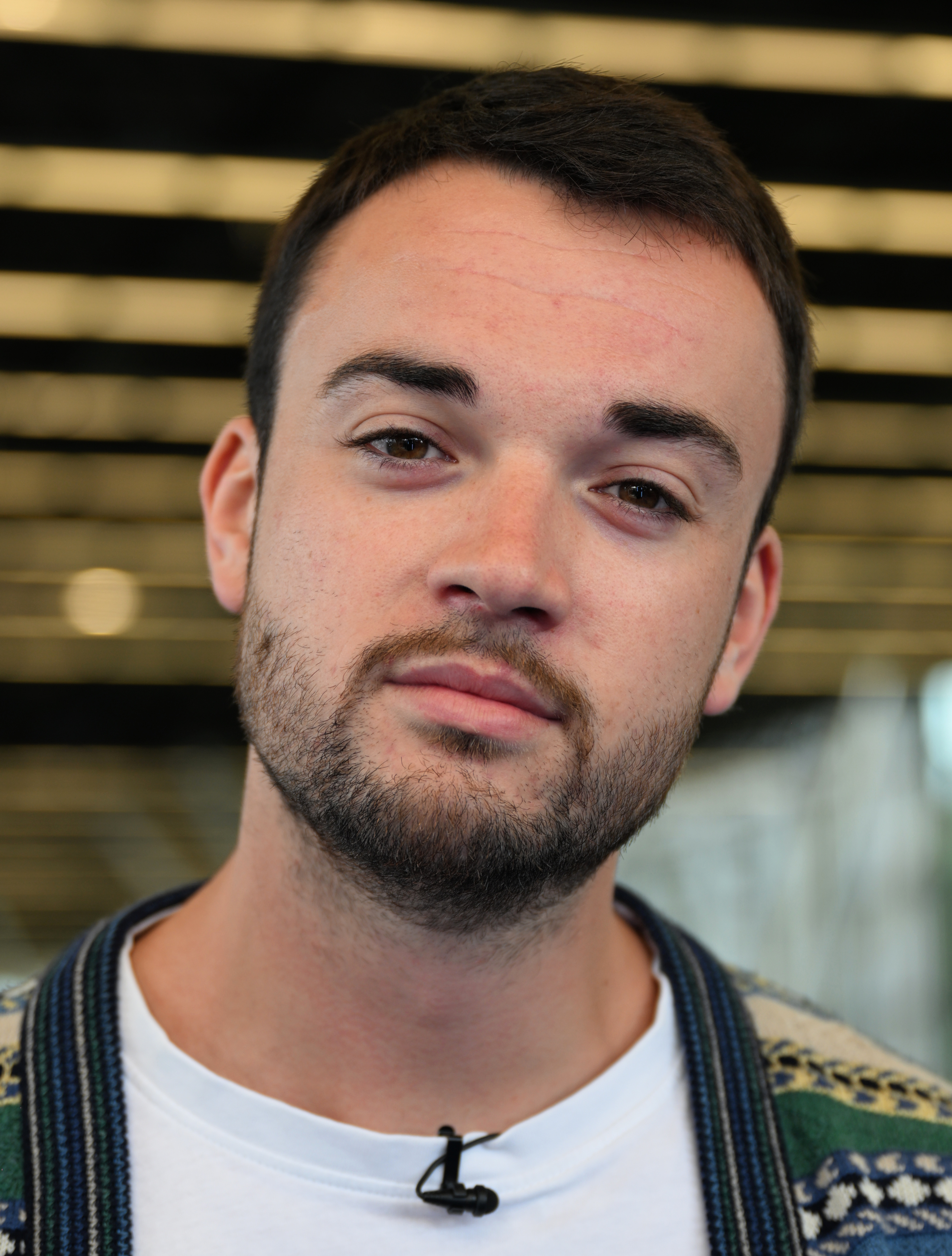
Jack Scarlett

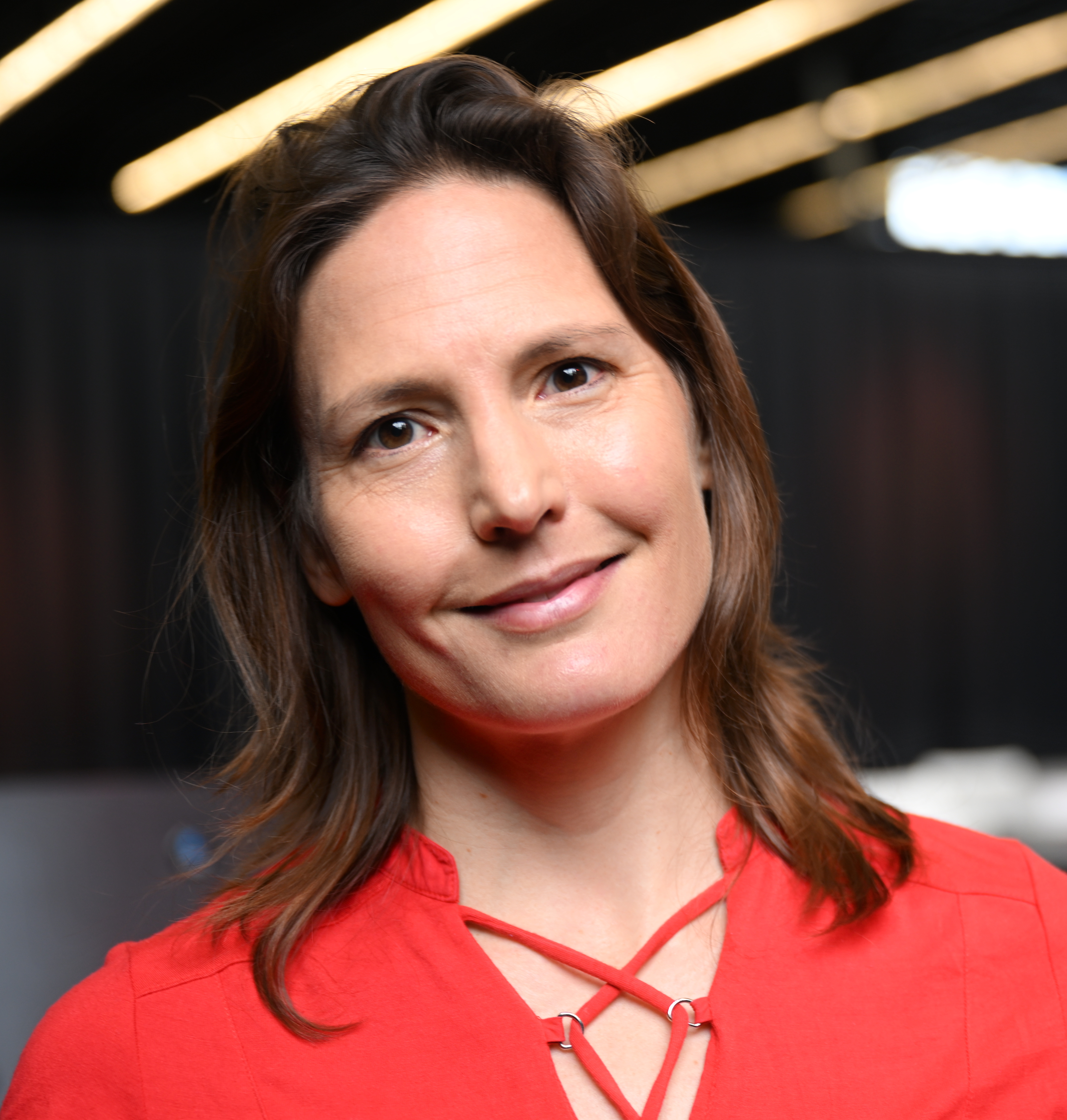
Helen Czerski

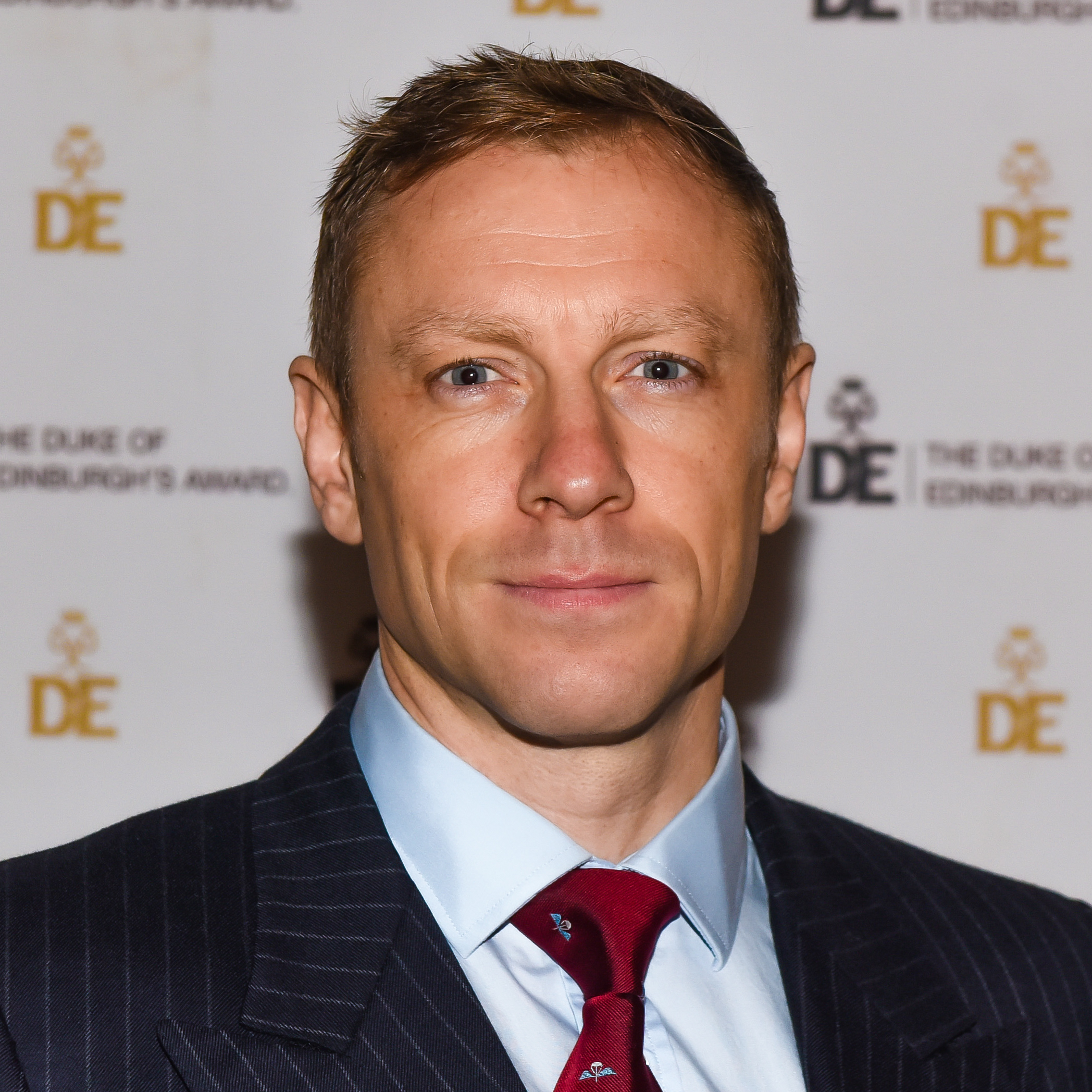
Andy Torbet

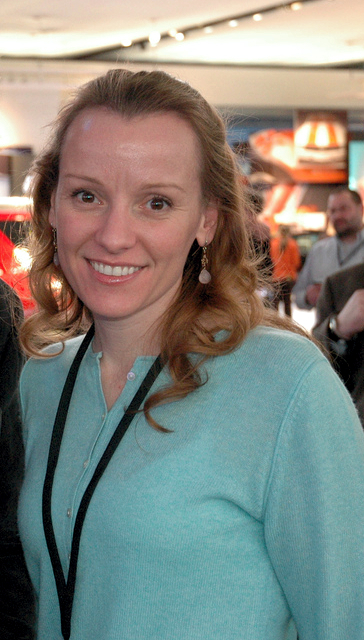
Chelsea Sexton

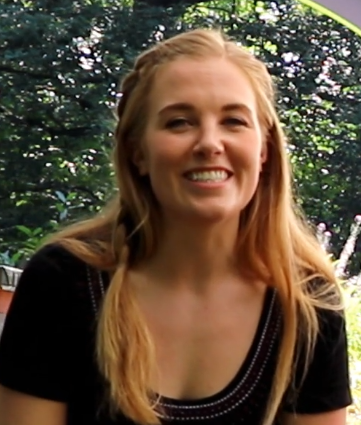
Maddie Moate

== Events ==
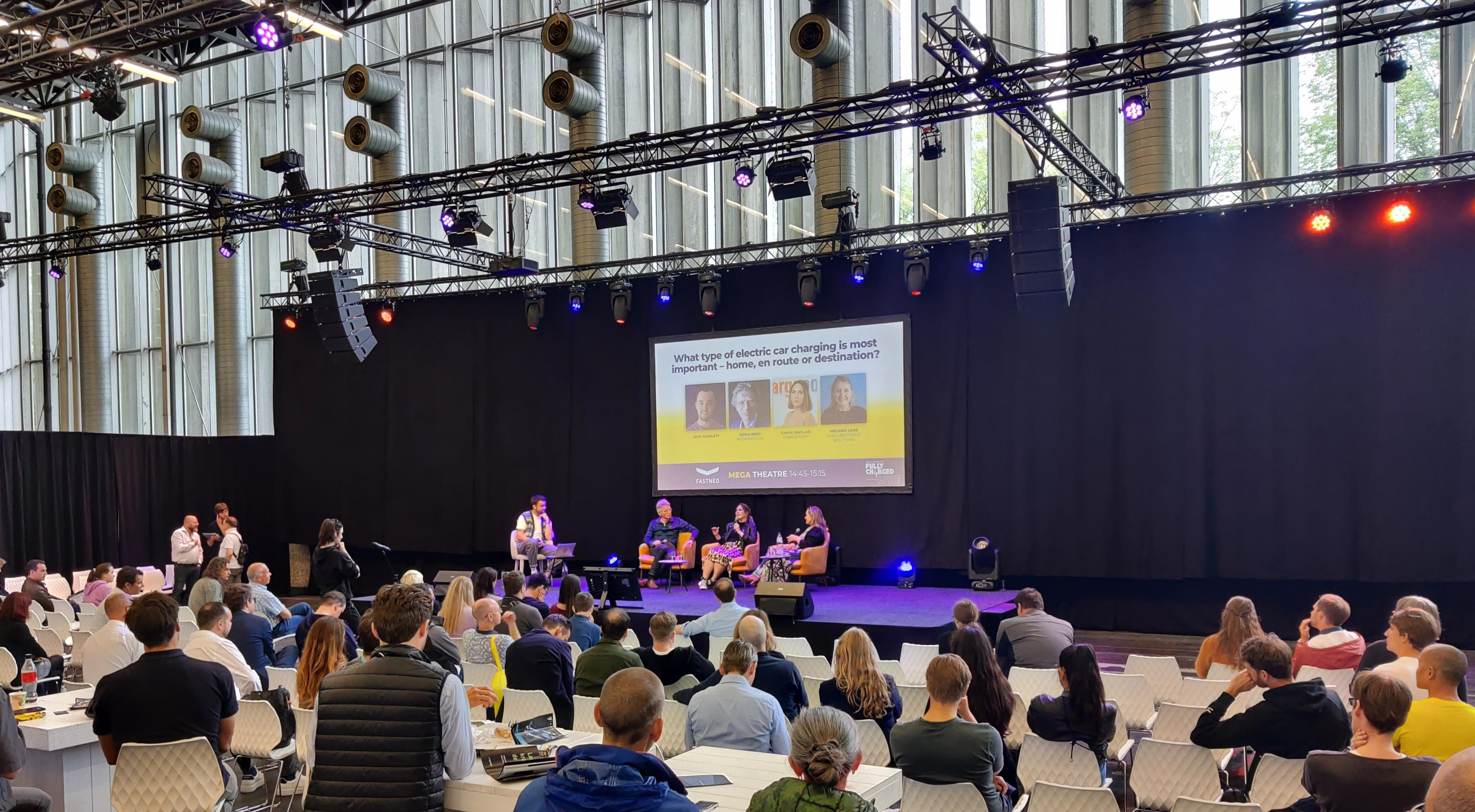
Presentations, workshops and talks being given at Fully Charged 2022 in Amsterdam.

The inaugural Fully Charged Live event, was held at Silverstone Circuit over the weekend of 9-10 June 2018. The event included panel discussions, presentations, exhibitions stalls from vendors and sponsors, and vehicle displays. Attendance at the event exceeded Llewellyn's expectations - attracting over 6,000 people. This event introduced physicist Dr Helen Czerski as a presenter of the team.

In 2019 the event took place in Silverstone on 7–9 June, and the first event in the United States, titled Fully Charged Live USA, was at Circuit of the Americas near Austin, Texas on 1–2 February 2020. After a year of lockdown the event continued at Farnborough International in 2021 with over 16,000 attending and Fully Charged continues to host many shows each year at different locations around the world.

In April 2023, the organisers announced a rebrand of the event to Everything Electric, starting with the February 2024 event Everything Electric Australia. Another popular feature of the events is the test drives of electric vehicles having served over 100,000 test drives across a span of 15 shows.

Events List
Year	Event	Date	Location	Notes / References
2018	Fully Charged LIVE	9-10 June 2018	Silverstone Circuit, United Kingdom	
2019	Fully Charged LIVE	7-9 June 2019	Silverstone Circuit, United Kingdom	Attendance: over 10,000
2020	Fully Charged LIVE USA	1-2 February 2020	Circuit of the Americas, Austin, Texas, USA	
2021	Fully Charged OUTSIDE	3-5 September 2021	Farnborough International, United Kingdom	Attendance: 16,259
2022	Fully Charged LIVE UK	29 April-1 May 2022	Farnborough International, United Kingdom	
2022	Fully Charged LIVE Europe	19-21 May 2022	RAI Amsterdam, Amsterdam, Netherlands	
2022	Fully Charged LIVE North America	10-11 September 2022	San Diego Convention Center, San Diego, California, USA	Attendance: 9,247
2023	Fully Charged LIVE Australia	11-12 March 2023	ICC Sydney, Sydney, Australia	Attendance: 13,988
2023	Fully Charged LIVE UK South	28-30 April 2023	Farnborough International, United Kingdom	
2023	Fully Charged LIVE UK North	19-21 May 2023	Yorkshire Event Centre, Harrogate, United Kingdom	
2023	Fully Charged LIVE Canada	8-10 September 2023	Vancouver Convention Centre, Vancouver, Canada	
2023	Fully Charged LIVE North America	27-29 October 2023	San Diego Convention Center, San Diego, USA	
2023	Fully Charged LIVE Europe	24-26 November 2023	RAI Amsterdam, Amsterdam, Netherlands	
2024	Everything Electric Australia	9-11 February 2024	Sydney Showground, Sydney, Australia	Attendance: 17,000
2024	Everything Electric London	28-30 March 2024	ExCeL London, London, United Kingdom	
2024	Everything Electric UK North	24-26 May 2024	Yorkshire Event Centre, Harrogate, United Kingdom	
2024	Everything Electric Canada	6-8 September 2024	Vancouver Convention Centre, Vancouver, Canada	
2024	Everything Electric UK South	11–13 October 2024	Farnborough International, United Kingdom	
2025	Everything Electric Australia NSW	7 – 9 March 2025	Sydney Olympic Park, Sydney, Australia	
2025	Everything Electric London	16 – 18 April 2025	ExCeL London, London, United Kingdom	
2025	Everything Electric Canada	5 – 7 September 2025	Vancouver Convention Centre, Vancouver, Canada	
2025	Everything Electric UK South	10 – 12 October 2025	Farnborough International, United Kingdom	
2025	Everything Electric Australia VIC	14 – 16 November 2025	Melbourne Showgrounds, Melbourne, Australia	

Events Gallery

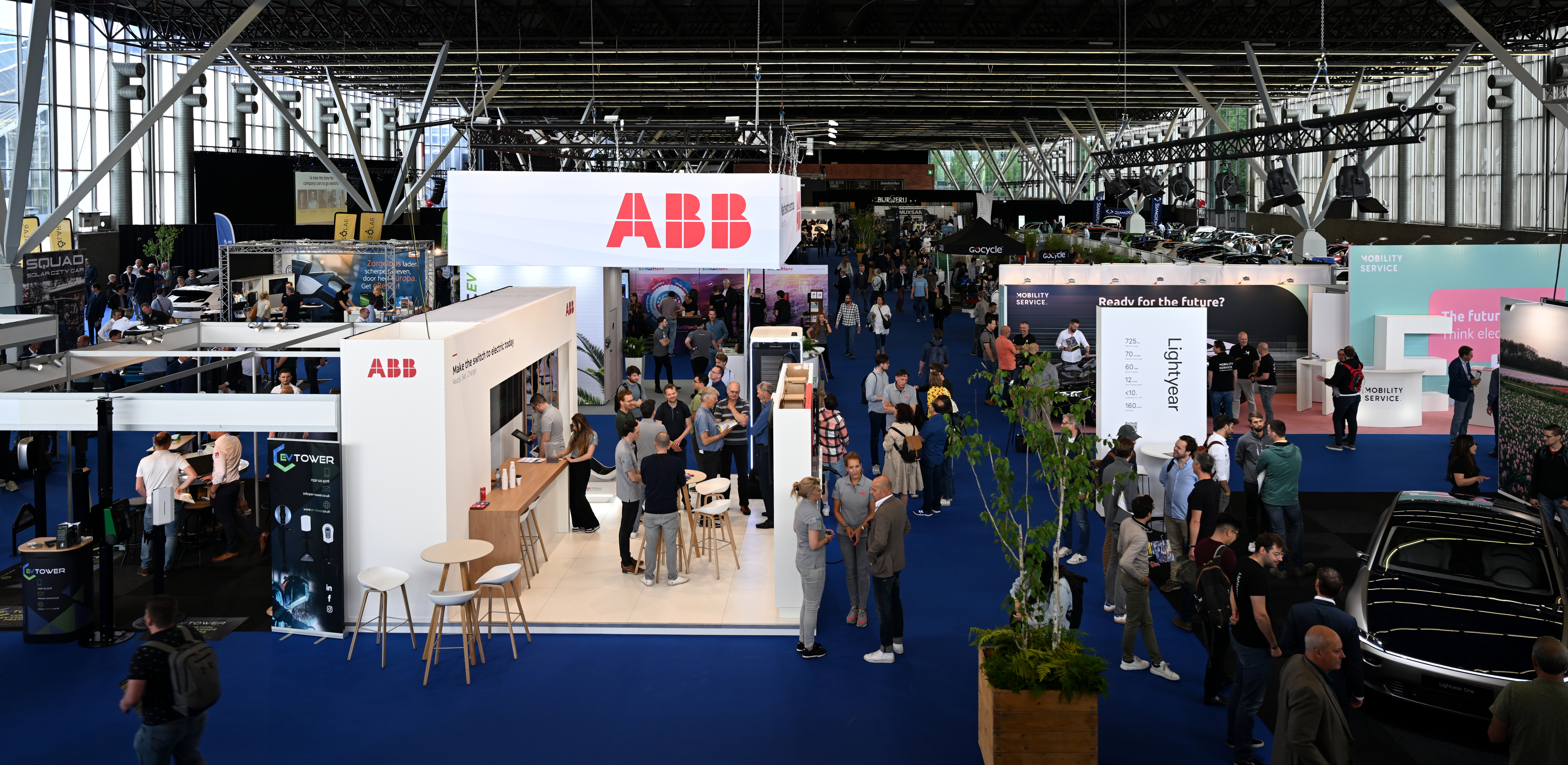
Interior of Fully Charged Live Europe 2022.

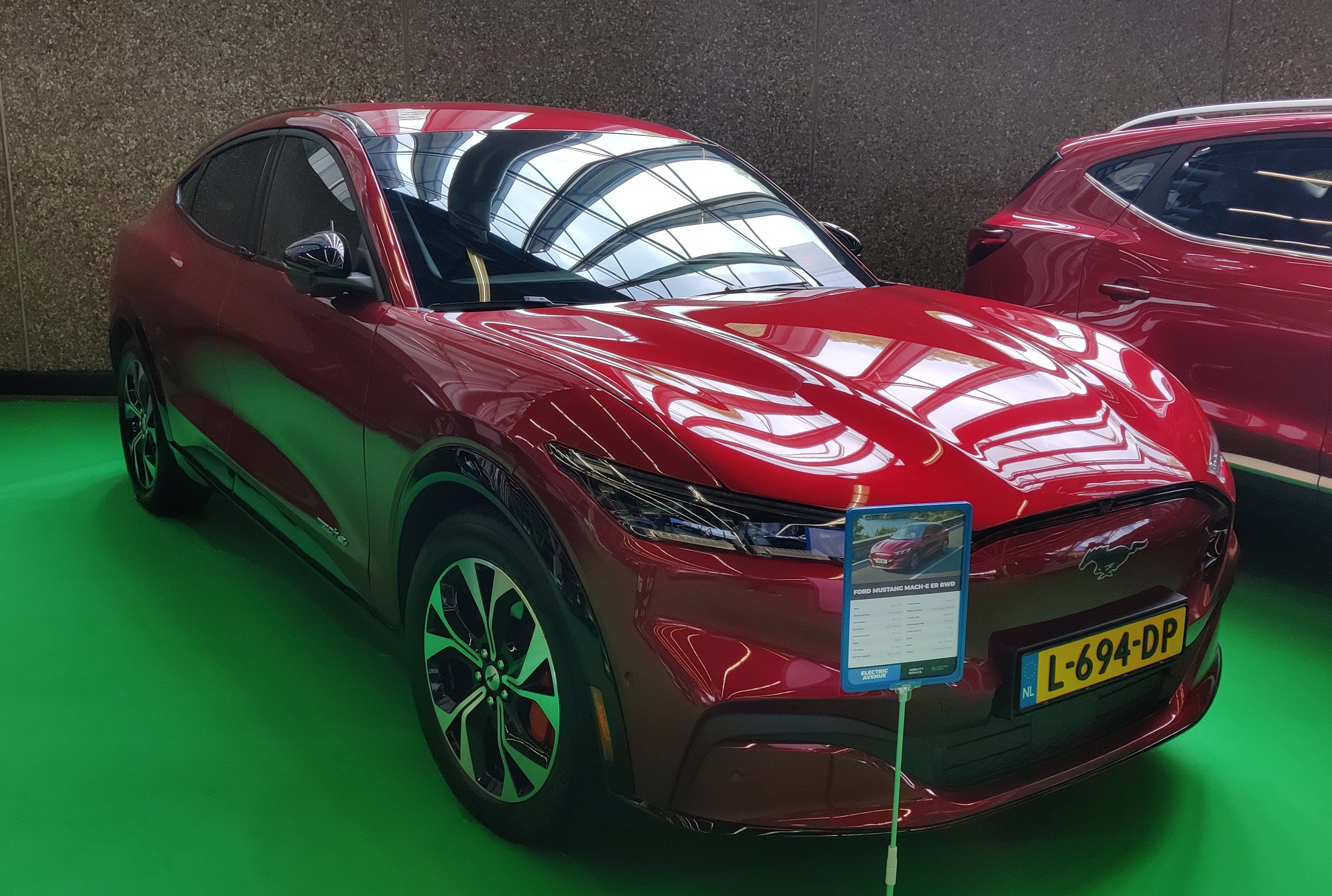
Ford Mustang Mach-E on display at Fully Charged in Amsterdam.

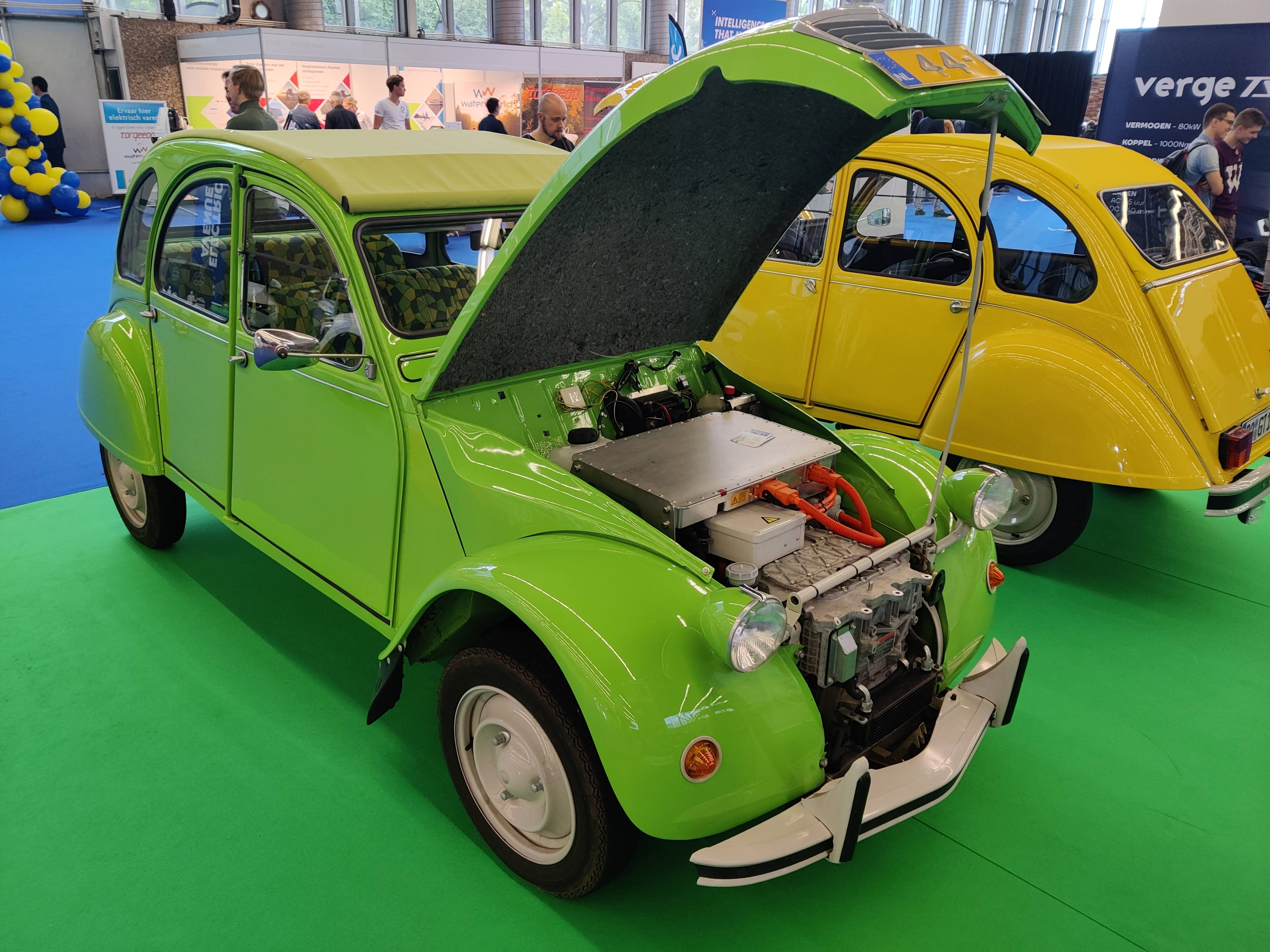
A Citroën 2CV retrofitted with an electric motor on display.

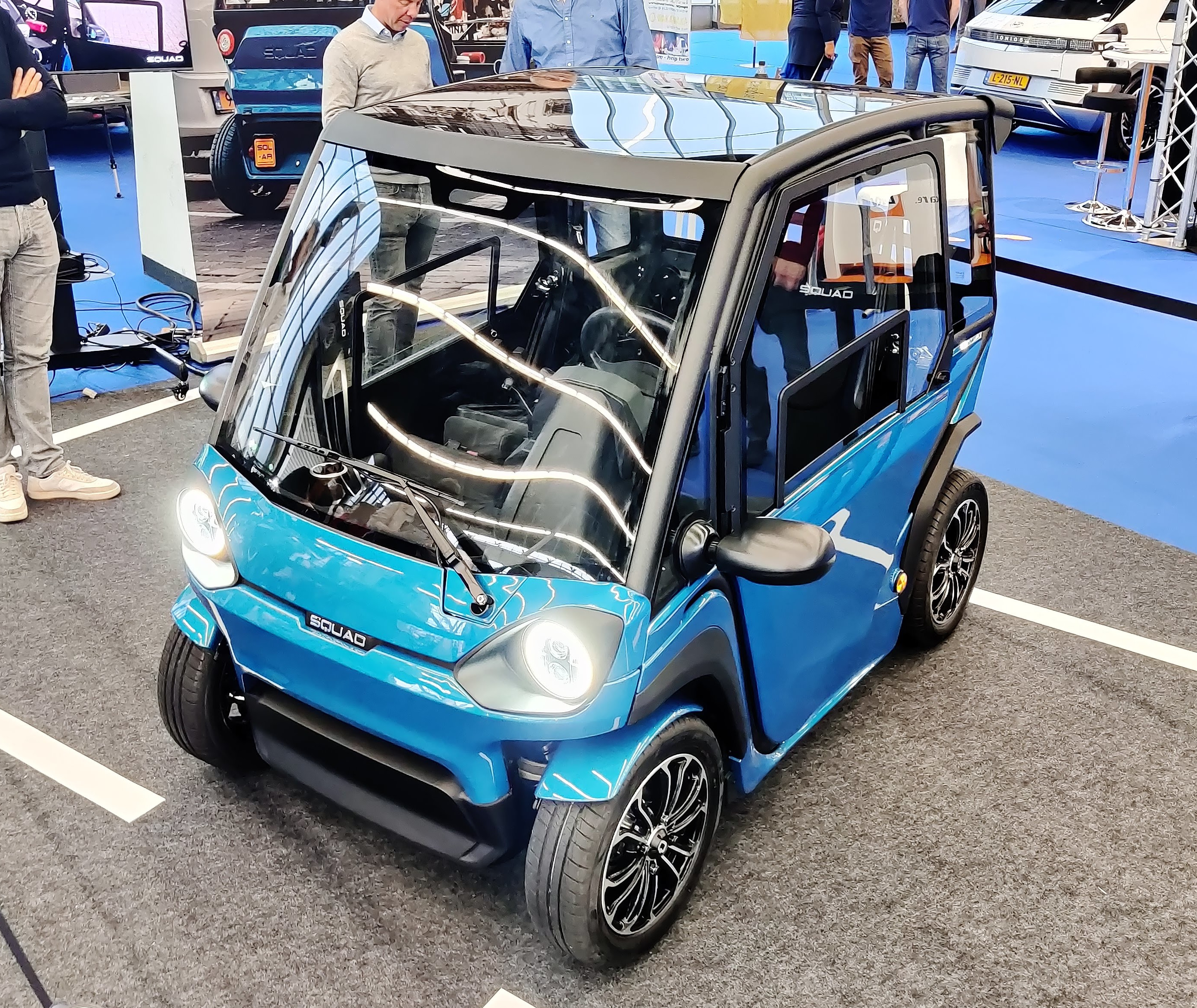
SQUAD solar car at Fully Charged Europe.

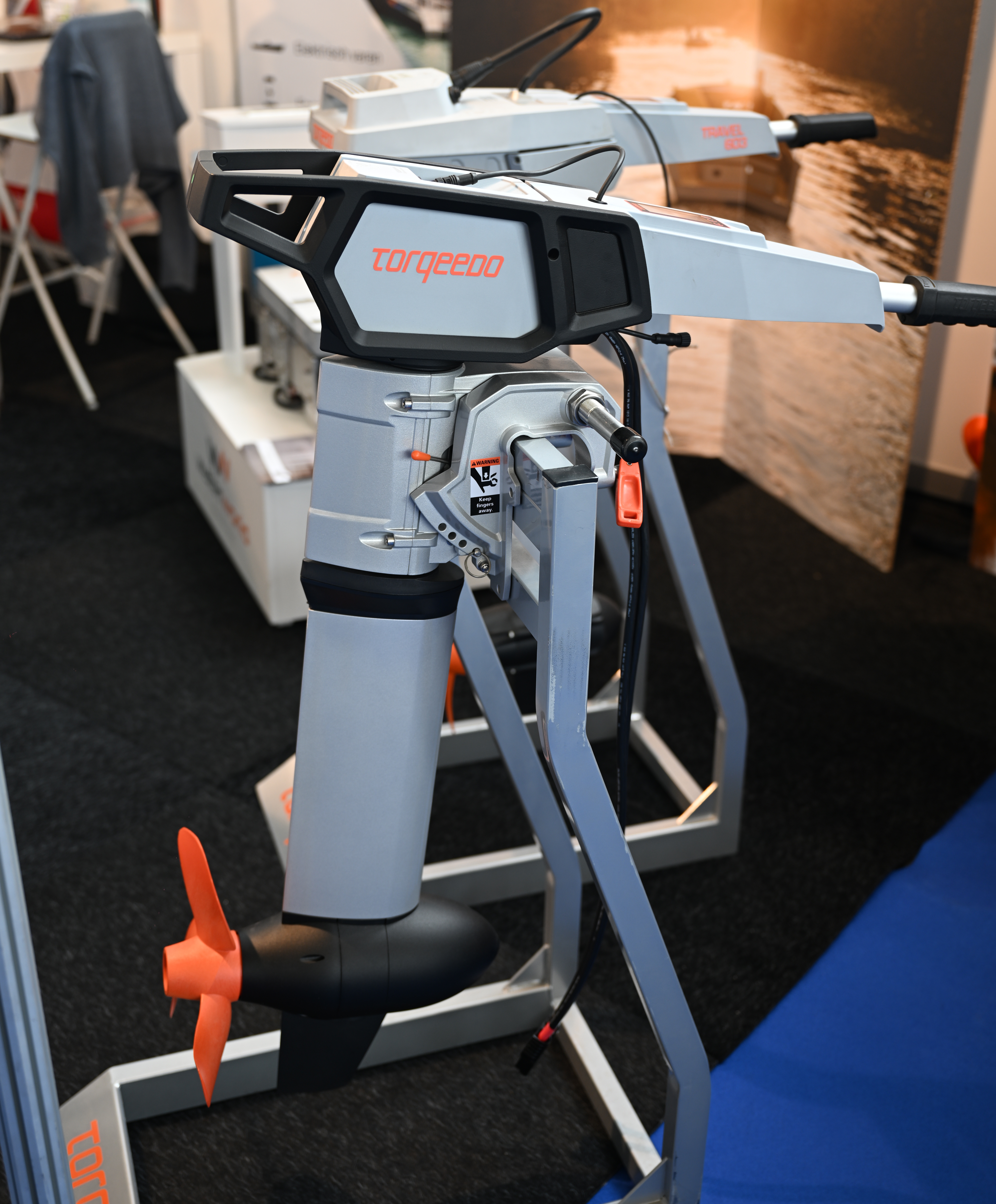
Electric boat motor by Torqeedo presented at Fully Charged.

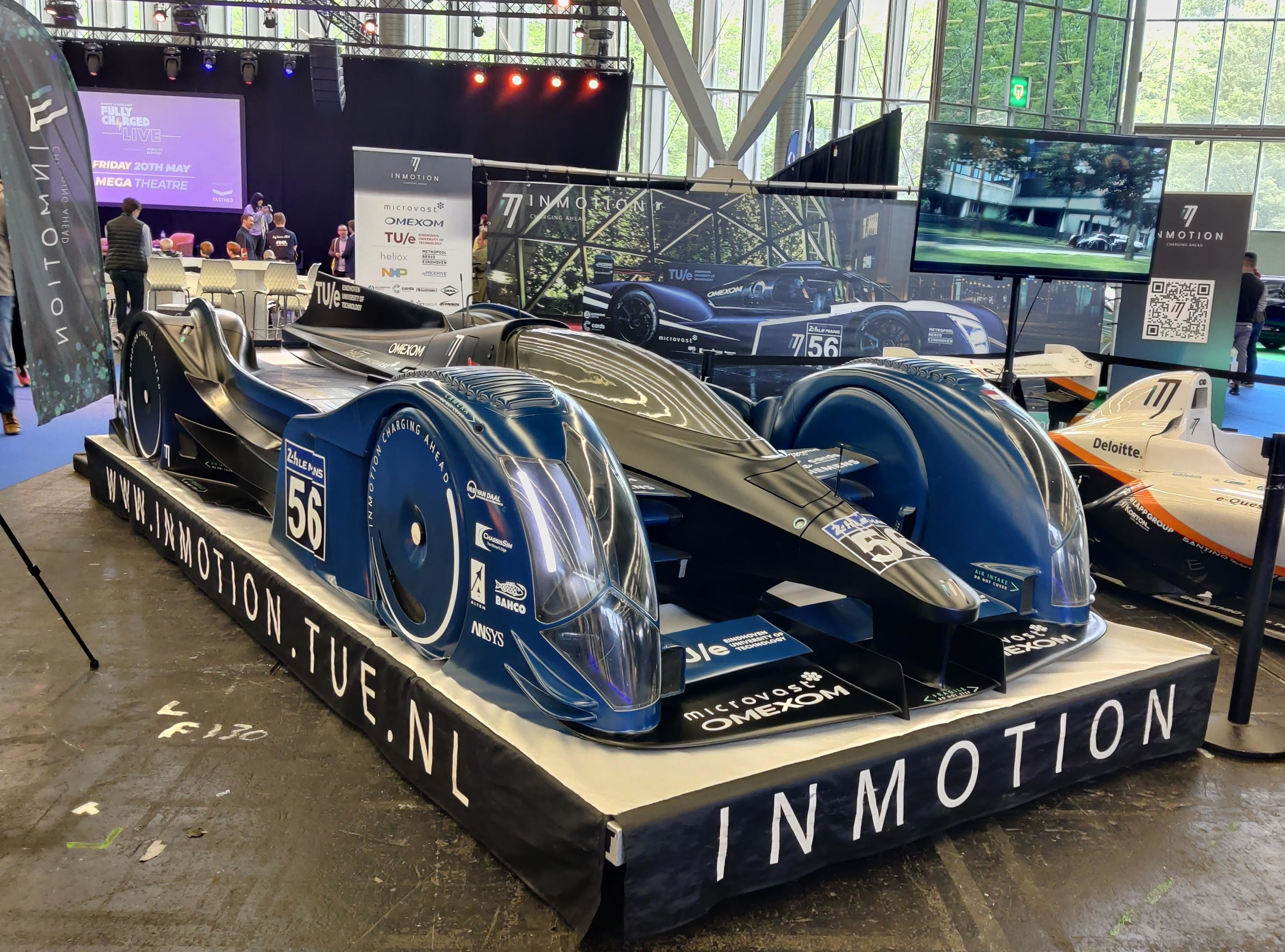
The autonomous electric sportscar "InMotion" on display.

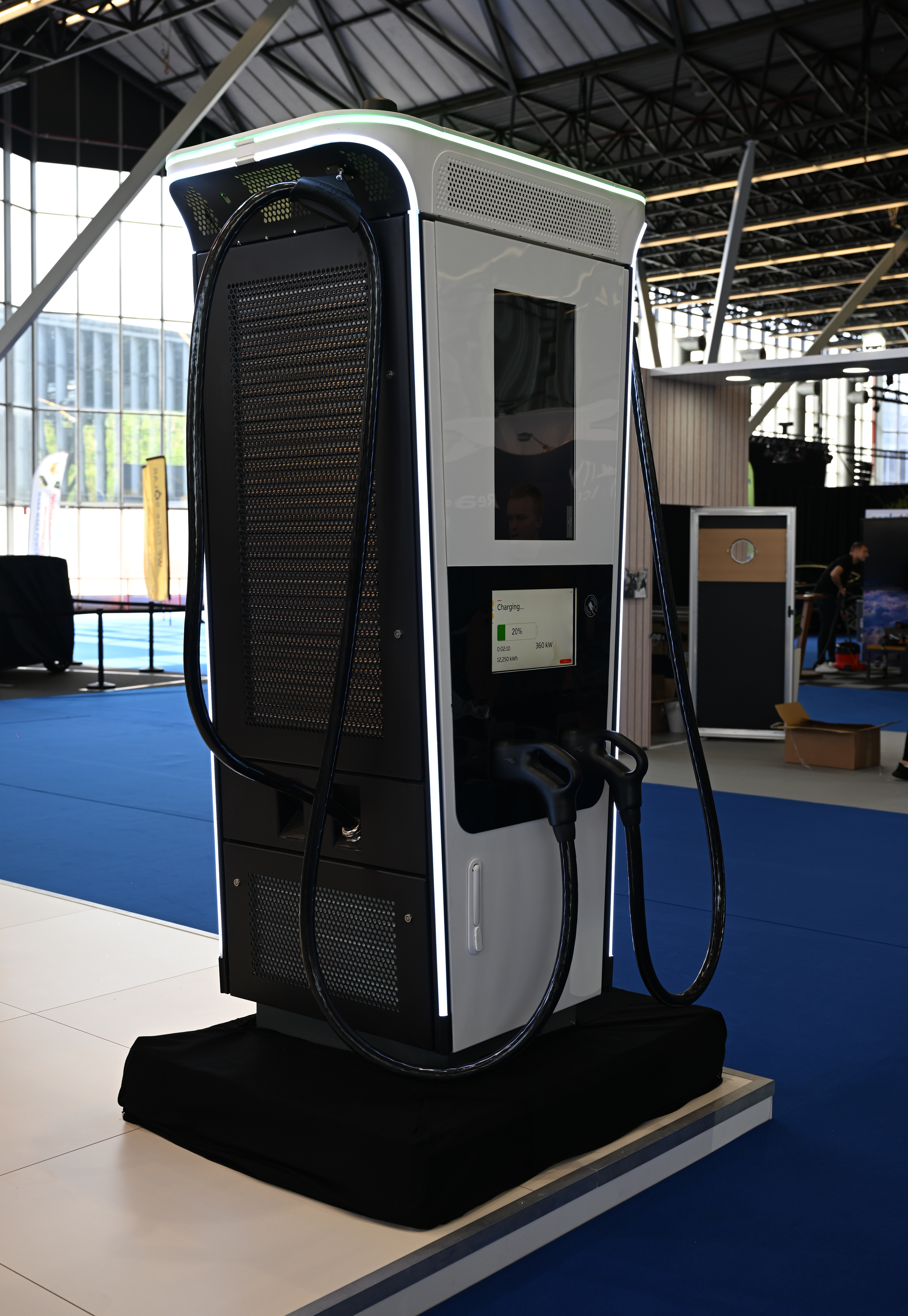
A new ABB fast charger on display.

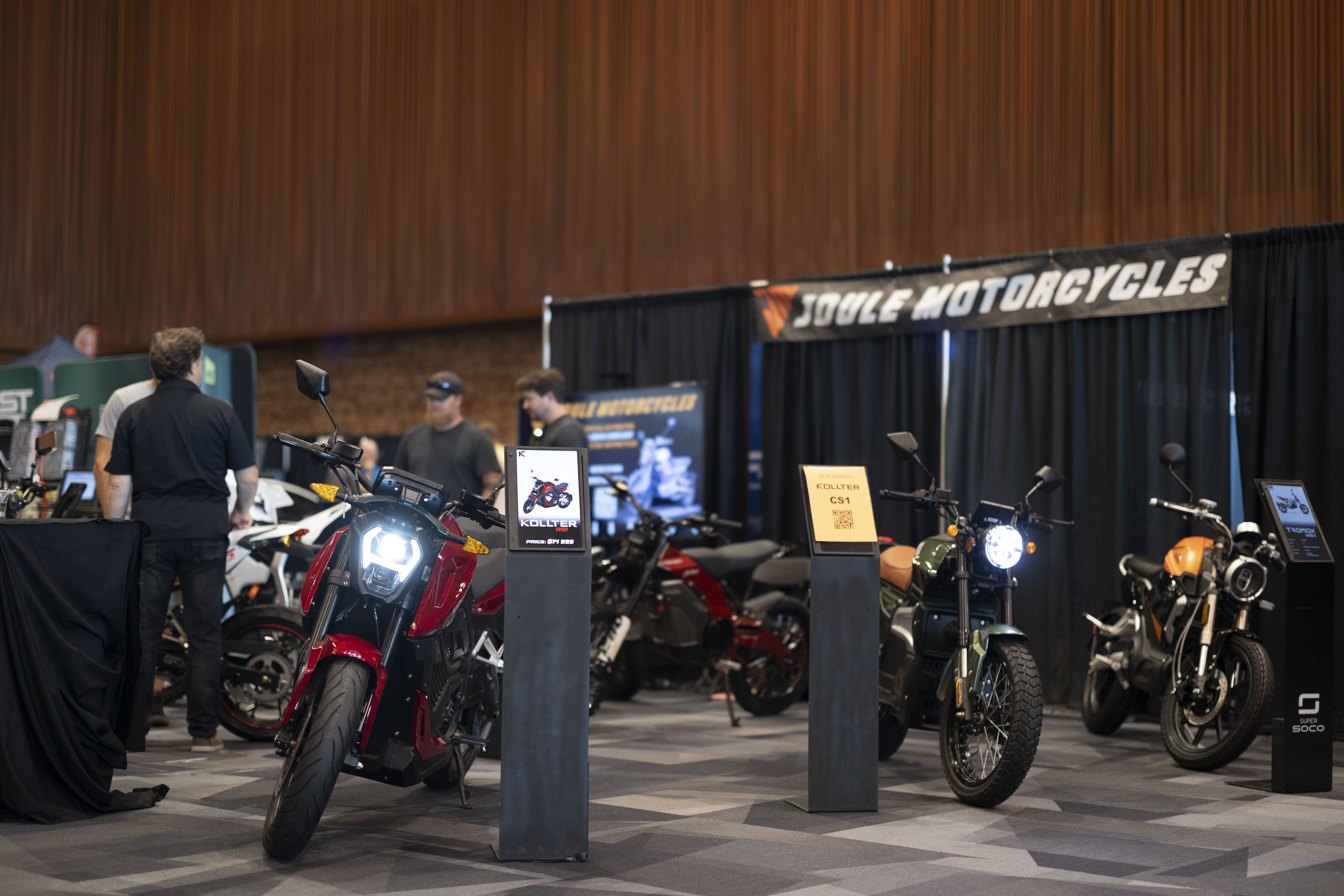
Electric motorcycles on display.

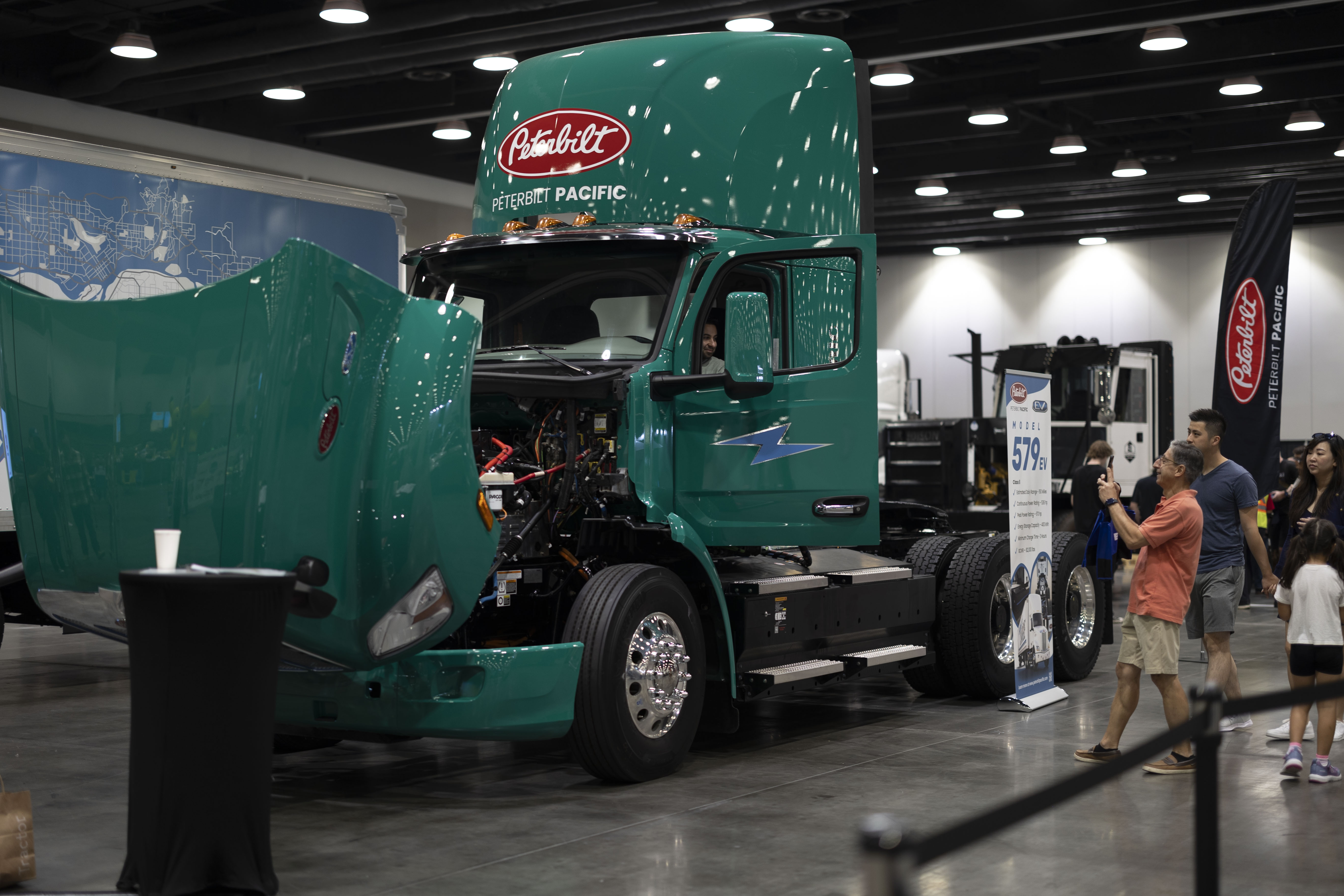
Electric semi by Peterbilt at Everything Electric Canada 2024.

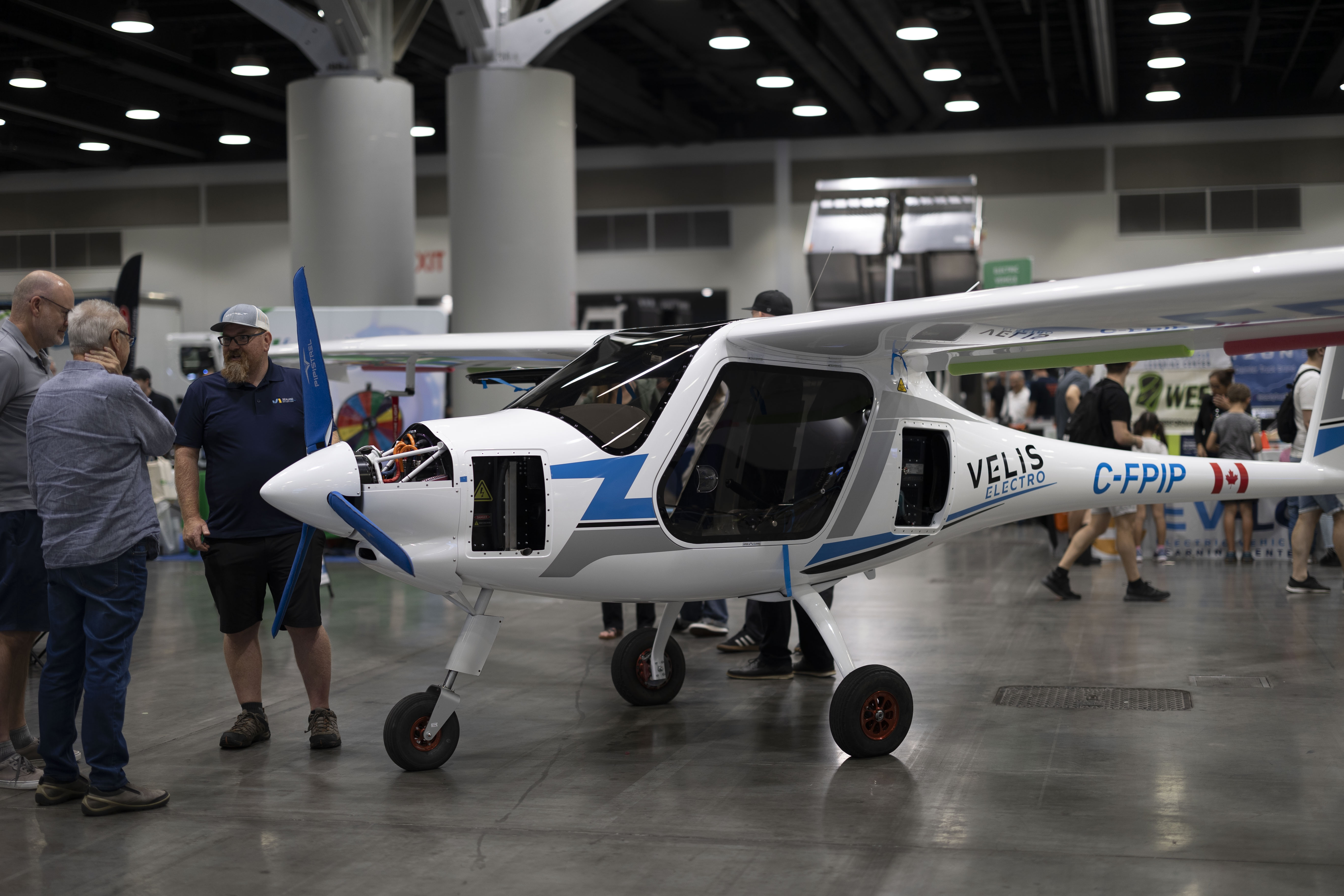
Electric aircraft by Pipistrel at Everything Electric Canada 2024.

== Episodes ==
=== 2019 – present ===
From 2019 to present Fully Charged has greatly expanded the number of episodes being presented which include the main Fully Charged Show, the Everything Electric Show second channel focused on home energy solutions, and a weekly podcast broadcast on different podcast platforms.

=== 2018 ===
Episode / date	Name
316/ 6 Jun 2018	Jaguar I-Pace, off-road and on track
315/ 1 Jun 2018	Bobby and Dale chew the electric Tofu
314/ 27 May 2018	Honda EV, Catamaran & a-ha
313/ 23 May 2018	Electric Range Rover
312/ 16 May 2018	The Electric Vehicle Experience Centre
311/ 11 May 2018	Fully Charged Live update
310/ 8 May 2018	Mercedes-Benz EQC
309/ 3 May 2018	Rimac Concept Two electric hypercar
308/ 1 May 2018	Fully Charged Live - Excitement Grows!
307/ 28 Apr 2018	Tesla Shooting-brake
306/ 21 Apr 2018	Bankwupt, Buses & Diggers
305/ 19 Apr 2018	Fully Charged Live 2018
304/ 15 Apr 2018	Jaguar I-PACE
303/ 6 Apr 2018	The Electric Mountain
302/ 30 Mar 2018	Geneva Motor Show 2018
301/ 26 Mar 2018	#rapidgate
300/ 25 Mar 2018	Casas Bioclimáticas
299/ 22 Mar 2018	New Nissan Leaf e-Pedal & ProPilot
298/ 15 Mar 2018	Geneva, Ultra Fast Chargers
297/ 4 Mar 2018	Audi Lunar Quattro
296/ 25 Feb 2018	Star Heat Pumps
295/ 21 Feb 2018	WLPT IEM and Gravitricity
294/ 16 Feb 2018	VW ID Buzz
293/ 10 Feb 2018	London Black Cab TX
292/ 3 Feb 2018	Bollinger B1 100% electric sport utility truck
291/ 1 Feb 2018	EST Guide to Electric Cars
290/ 1 Feb 2018	EST
289/ 29 Jan 2018	Disruptive Disruption
288/ 24 Jan 2018	Impossible Burger
287/ 18 Jan 2018	Jaguar iPace
286/ 12 Jan 2018	Barriers to EV Adoption
285/ 5 Jan 2018	Tokyo Motor Show
284/ 2 Jan 2018	Welcome to 2018

=== 2017 ===
Episode / date	Name
283/ 23 Dec 2017	2017 Christmas Special
282/ 16 Dec 2017	Nissan Leaf 2018
281/ 10 Dec 2017	Power Houses, Small Cars
280/ 2 Dec 2017	Autonomy Paris
279/ 29 Nov 2017	Battery Powered Train
278/ 24 Nov 2017	Tesla Tesla Tesla
277/ 19 Nov 2017	Bosch Connected Car
276/ 16 Nov 2017	Daily Mail Electric Car Rant
275/ 12 Nov 2017	Tesla Model S Shooting-brake
274/ 9 Nov 2017	Shell Recharge
273/ 5 Nov 2017	E.ON Exclusive preview
272/ 3 Nov 2017	UK Parliament Special
271/ 1 Nov 2017	Dynamic Electric Vehicle Charging
270/ 27 Oct 2017	Carol Vorderman
269/ 23 Oct 2017	Clean Cities, Floating turbines & Electric Planes
268/ 19 Oct 2017	TransforMOTION
267/ 15 Oct 2017	Zappi smart EV charger
266/ 11 Oct 2017	Jaguar E-Type Zero
265/ 6 Oct 2017	Orkney 3. EMEC Tidal Power
264/ 1 Oct 2017	VW e-Golf 2017
263/ 29 Sep 2017	Offshore wind, solar cars and giraffes
262/ 20 Sep 2017	Formula E & Renault Zoe
261/ 17 Sep 2017	Tesla Taxi, Mini E & Postman Pat
260/ 13 Sep 2017	Orkney 2. Building the Future
259/ 6 Sep 2017	2018 Nissan Leaf
258/ 5 Sep 2017	Bolts, Batteries and Petrolithium
257/ 31 Aug 2017	Tesla Powerwall 2
256/ 27 Aug 2017	Orkney 'Surf n Turf'
255/ 24 Aug 2017	Kettles, Particulates & Flexible Grid
254/ 18 Aug 2017	More Massive Winds
253/ 12 Aug 2017	Hydrogen-100% cars electric
252/ 10 Aug 2017	2040 & Faraday Past
251/ 4 Aug 2017	Electric Porsche 911
250/ 3 Aug 2017	Nissan Leaf, Toyota & IKEA
249/ 31 Jul 2017	Tesla Model 3 and Volvo
248/ 28 Jul 2017	Plug in Adventures-Mongol Rally
247/ 25 Jul 2017	Renault Zoe e-Sport
246/ 15 Jul 2017	Queen's Speech & Big Batteries
245/ 5 Jul 2017	Electric Vehicles Outlook
244/ 30 Jun 2017	Tesla Model S 100D
243/ 27 Jun 2017	Golf GTE
242/ 19 Jun 2017	EV Sales & German Batteries
241/ 16 Jun 2017	Ubitricity
240/ 12 Jun 2017	Emmy Scooters
239/ 8 Jun 2017	EUREF
238/ 5 Jun 2017	Vanda Dendrobium
237/ 1 Jun 2017	Ceres Power
236/ 29 May 2017	Nürburgring & Tesla Model 3
235/ 25 May 2017	Good Energy
234/ 18 May 2017	Motochimp
233/ 15 May 2017	FISITA plus announcement
232/ 10 May 2017	Clean Cities & Flying Cars
231/ 4 May 2017	EasyCharge.me LEVIAMP
230/ 30 Apr 2017	Netherlands to Australia-Overland
229/ 25 Apr 2017	EV Update-April
228/ 18 Apr 2017	Winds, Nukes and Oil
227/ 15 Apr 2017	Tesla Model X
226/ 12 Apr 2017	Recalibration
225/ 5 Apr 2017	Redflow ZCell batteries
224/ 2 Apr 2017	Solar-tastic
223/ 30 Mar 2017	Autonomous Nissan Leaf
222/ 23 Mar 2017	Smart Electric Drive
221/ 17 Mar 2017	Sustainable City
220/ 15 Mar 2017	Euratom & Glass Batteries News
219/ 10 Mar 2017	Emirates Electric Road Trip
218/ 1 Mar 2017	Pavegen
217/ 25 Feb 2017	Sundrop Farm – Intellibus
216/ 23 Feb 2017	BMW 330e
215/ 17 Feb 2017	Trucks and Buses
214/ 15 Feb 2017	Ecotricity – Green Gas
213/ 8 Feb 2017	BMW i3 – 94 Ah
212/ 5 Feb 2017	Chernobyl & cobalt mining News
211/ 31 Jan 2017	Special News Update
210/ 25 Jan 2017	Autonomous Cars News
209/ 21 Jan 2017	Lucid Air Opinion
208/ 18 Jan 2017	Renault Zoe ZE 40
207/ 11 Jan 2017	Solar Road & Lithium Anxiety News
206/ 5 Jan 2017	Faraday Future FF91

=== 2016 ===
Episode / date	Name
205/ 22 Dec 2016	Christmas Special
204/ 14 Dec 2016	Volvo V60 D5 PHEV
203/ 6 Dec 2016	POD Point
202/ 30 Nov 2016	Bio-Hybrid
201/ 24 Nov 2016	KIA Optima PHEV
200/ 17 Nov 2016	GKN
199/ 9 Nov 2016	Hyundai IONIQ electric
198/ 2 Nov 2016	ITM Hydrogen Rally
197/ 26 Oct 2016	Mercedes B250e
196/ 24 Oct 2016	News Update 9
195/ 24 Oct 2016	Electric Nation
194/ 19 Oct 2016	BritWind
193/ 12 Oct 2016	Sunamp Heat Battery
192/ 11 Oct 2016	Tesla update 8.0 360
191/ 4 Oct 2016	Mercedes C350e
190/ 28 Oct 2016	Big Wind
189/ 21 Sep 2016	News Update 8
188/ 19 Sep 2016	Electric VW Beetle
187/ 15 Sep 2016	Tesla Powerwall
186/ 7 Sep 2016	Leasing and 2nd Hand Electric Cars
185/ 4 Sep 2016	Ecotricity-The Electric Highway
184/ 31 Aug 2016	Vmoto Electric Scooters
183/ 24 Aug 2016	Route 57
182/ 22 Aug 2016	100,000 + subscriptions!
181/ 17 Aug 2016	News Update 4
180/ 10 Aug 2016	Fully Charged Electric Bikes
179/ 3 Aug 2016	Fastned
178/ 31 Jul 2016	Being ICE’d
177/ 27 Jul 2016	Richard Bruce – OLEV – Carpool
176/ 20 Jul 2016	Electric Boat
175/ 17 Jul 2016	Rebranding
174/ 14 Jul 2016	CleanSpace
173/ 6 Jul 2016	Electroflight
172/ 4 Jul 2016	Top Gear
171/ 29 Jun 2016	Electric Houses
170/ 22 Jun 2016	eRally Zoe
169/ 19 Jun 2016	News Update 3
168/ 15 Jun 2016	Mahindra e2o
167/ 12 Jun 2016	News Update 2
166/ 8 Jun 2016	Electric Quad Bike
165/ 7 Jun 2016	Electric Cars are Dirty!
164/ 1 Jun 2016	Tesla Model X
163/ 25 May 2016	Toyota RAV4 Hybrid
162/ 18 May 2016	Tesla Autopilot – Summon
161/ 15 May 2016	Corrections and additions
160/ 11 May 2016	Riversimple
159/ 4 May 2016	Tesla Model 3
158/ 27 Apr 2016	BMW i3 REx
157/ 20 Apr 2016	Hinkley Point C – Oh Deary Me
156/ 15 Apr 2016	Tesla Model S P90DL
155/ 3 Apr 2016	Patreon

=== 2015 ===
Episode / date	Name
154/ 3 Dec 2015	Final show of 2015
153/ 26 Nov 2015	Flux Capacitor
152/ 18 Nov 2015	Toyota Mirai HFC
151/ 11 Nov 2015	Longer Range 30kWh Nissan Leaf
150/ 5 Nov 2015	Low Carbon Vehicles review
149/ 1 Nov 2015	Bosch pro electric Lawnmower
148/ 28 Oct 2015	Tesla Autopilot
147/ 21 Oct 2015	Batteries to the Future
146/ 14 Oct 2015	Three Wheels Are Terrific
145/ 8 Oct 2015	Battery V Petrol. The Lawnmower Test
144/ 1 Oct 2015	Electric cars and the Blind
143/ 27 Sep 2015	Dieselgate rant
142/ 24 Sep 2015	Tesla Trip to Italy
141/ 17 Sep 2015	VW Passat GTE
140/ 12 Sep 2015	BYD e6 – Thriev
139/ 7 Aug 2015	Coming soon
138/ 31 Jul 2015	Tesla Model S P85D
137	Airbus E-Fan
136/ 16 Jul 2015	Tesla 1,007 mile update
135/ 14 Jul 2015	Nissan env200 Evalia
134/ 8 Jul 2015	DHL Blue Sky Award
133/ 7 Jul 2015	Autonomous Off Road Vehicle
132/ 3 Jul 2015	Tesla Model S Handover
131/ 1 Jul 2015	The Electric Highway
130/ 25 Jun 2015	Hyundai ix35 HFC
129/ 19 Jun 2015	Berlin Formula E
128/ 10 Jun 2015	World Record Attempt
127/ 6 Jun 2015	Batteries
126/ 26 May 2015	VW Golf GTE arrives
125/ 19 May 2015	Orkney – Island of the Future
124/ 15 May 2015	Smart Cities
123/ 8 May 2015	BMW i8
122/ 5 May 2015	Traffic Jam Assist
121/ 28 Apr 2015	Oslo to London for €5
120/ 25 Apr 2015	Escrypt by Bosch
119/ 22 Apr 2015	Tesla – 1st Acceleration Test
118/ 16 Apr 2015	Bosch eBike
117/ 14 Apr 2015	Ivanpah Solar Project
116/ 10 Apr 2015	Toyota Prius V
115/ 7 Apr 2015	DHL Blue Sky Transport Award
114/ 2 Mar 2015	Cadillac ELR

=== 2014 ===
Episode / date	Name
113/ 6 Dec 2014	KIA Soul EV
112/ 17 Oct 2014	Mitsubishi Outlander PHEV
111/ 17 Sep 2014	BMW i8
110/ 8 Sep 2014	VW Golf GTE
109/ 24 Aug 2014	Formula E
108/ 15 Aug 2014	Tesla Model S Road Trips
107/ 17 Jul 2014	Flat Battery
106/ 10 Jul 2014	Nissan e NV200
105/ 3 Jun 2014	Porsche Panamera S e-Hybrid
104/ 22 May 2014	Dale Vince Ecotricity
103/ 16 May 2014	Richard Noble
102/ 8 May 2014	Volts for Miles
101/ 2 May 2014	Volts for Oil
100/ 30 Apr 2014	Lexus is300h
99/ 23 Apr 2014	Renault Kangoo ZE, Gravity Light
98/ 16 Apr 2014	Electric Avenue
97/ 9 Apr 2014	MetroCab
96/ 2 Apr 2014	VW e-Golf
95/ 26 Mar 2014	Tesla Model S 85 performance plus
94/ 19 Mar 2014	Drayson B12 200 mph electric car
93/ 12 Mar 2014	Zero Carbon Cheese
92/ 5 Mar 2014	Ford Focus Electric
91/ 26 Feb 2014	Second Generation Nissan Leaf
90/ 19 Feb 2014	Welsh Electric Road Trip
89/ 12 Feb 2014	VolksWagen e-UP!
88/ 5 Feb 2014	The Electric Highway | London to Edinburgh
87/ 29 Jan 2014	BMW i3
86/ 22 Jan 2014	Zero S electric Motorbike
85/ 15 Jan 2014	Electric Land Rover Defender
84/ 9 Jan 2014	VW XL1

=== 2013 ===
Episode / date	Name
83/ 26 Dec 2013	Fully Charged | 2014 tease
82/ 31 Oct 2013	Fully Charged | New Season Announcement
81/ 16 Apr 2013	Racing Nissan Leaf
80/ 16 Apr 2013	Green Power at Silverstone
79/ 16 Apr 2013	Carbon Capture
78/ 16 Apr 2013	Hydrogen Production
77/ 16 Apr 2013	Home EV Charger
76/ 16 Apr 2013	Supercapacitors
75/ 16 Apr 2013	Tidal Turbines
74/ 16 Apr 2013	Wind Farming
73/ 16 Apr 2013	Whisky Power
72/ 29 Mar 2013	The Renault Zoe
71/ 24 Mar 2013	An Electric car called Trev
70/ 13 Feb 2013	Renewable Energy in 60 Seconds
69/ 30 Jan 2013	Hydrogen Fuel Cells in 60 Seconds
68/ 23 Jan 2013	Masdar City in 60 Seconds
67/ 18 Jan 2013	Car Sharing in 60 Seconds
66/ 16 Jan 2013	National Grid in 60 Seconds
65/ 9 Jan 2013	The Energy Efficient House in 60 Seconds
64/ 2 Jan 2013	Electric Bikes in 60 Seconds

=== 2012 ===
Episode / date	Name
63/ 19 Dec 2012	Heathrow Pods in 60 Seconds
62/ 5 Dec 2012	Agility Saietta in 60 Seconds
61/ 28 Nov 2012	Renault Twizy in 60 Seconds
60/ 8 Nov 2012	Red Dwarf Interview with Doug Naylor
59/ 5 Oct 2012	Behind the Scenes and Bloopers!
59/ 3 Oct 2012	Masdar: The City of the Future – part 2
59/ 26 Sep 2012	Masdar: The City of the Future – part 1
58/ 5 Sep 2012	Customer Led Network Revolution (CLNR)
57/ 29 Aug 2012	The Green Deal
56/ 23 Aug 2012	Smart Meters
55/ 15 Aug 2012	Inductive Charging
54/ 8 Aug 2012	Energy Harvesting Factory
53/ 1 Aug 2012	ULTra PRT
52/ 25 Jul 2012	The Energy Efficient House
51/ 18 Jul 2012	Renewable Energy in Germany
50/ 11 Jul 2012	Car Sharing
49/ 4 Jul 2012	Q&A Part 2
48/ 27 Jun 2012	Lightning GT
47/ 20 Jun 2012	Q&A
46/ 13 Jun 2012	Agility Saietta
45/ 6 Jun 2012	Electric Bikes
44/ 30 May 2012	Home of the Future
43/ 23 May 2012	Wind, Waves and Whisky
42/ 16 May 2012	Green Power at Silverstone
41/ 9 May 2012	Imperial College London
40/ 2 May 2012	National Grid
39/ 25 Apr 2012	Hydrogen Fuel Cells
38/ 18 Apr 2012	Renault Twizy Review
37/ 11 Apr 2012	Volvo Electric C30 & Bluebird BE-1
36/ 4 Apr 2012	Standby
35/ 28 Mar 2012	Farming Wind
34/ 21 Mar 2012	Welcome To Fully Charged
33/ 19 Feb 2012	2012 Announcement

=== 2011 ===
Episode / date	Name
32/ 1 Nov 2011	Round Up 02
31/ 7 Oct 2011	Mia
30/ 28 Sep 2011	Ford Transit Connect
29/ 23 Sep 2011	Peugeot 3008 Diesel Hybrid
28/ 27 Aug 2011	Volvo V60 PHEV
27/ 3 Aug 2011	Top Gear Eco Rally
26/ 26 Jul 2011	Renault Fluence ZE
25/ 16 Jul 2011	Vauxhall Ampera EREV
24/ 9 Jul 2011	Infiniti M35h Hybrid
23/ 29 Jun 2011	YASA Motor Works
22/ 13 Jun 2011	Renault and Nissan CEO Interview
21/ 7 Jun 2011	Solar PV
20/ 30 May 2011	Rolls-Royce 102 EX & The Vauxhall Ampera
19/ 17 May 2011	Delta E4 & The Blackcurrent
18/ 19 Apr 2011	Zero Carbon Leaf Drive
17/ 25 Mar 2011	Delta E4 Coupe
16/ 14 Mar 2011	Lexus CT200h
15/ 7 Mar 2011	Geneva Motor show 2011
14/ 12 Feb 2011	Volvo C 30 Electric car
13/ 16 Jan 2011	My Trusty Old Land Rover
12/ 12 Jan 2011	Tesla to Edinburgh in 1 day

=== 2010 ===
Episode / date	Name
11/ 4 Dec 2010	Farewell iMiev
10/ 22 Nov 2010	Discussion with Rory Reid
9/ 30 Oct 2010	Nemesis Electric super car
8/ 2 Oct 2010	Plug In Prius
7/ 2 Sep 2010	Toyota Auris HSD
6/ 16 Aug 2010	Round-up 001
5/ 2 Aug 2010	Nissan Leaf
4/ 26 Jul 2010	Mini E
3/ 5 Jul 2010	Mitsubishi iMiev
2/ 22 Jun 2010	Honda FCX Clarity
1/ 16 Jun 2010	Pilot | Fully Charged

== Notes ==
Footnotes
