= Top Trumps (TV series) =

- The Top Trumps logo
- Starring: Robert Llewellyn; Ashley Hames
- Country of origin: United Kingdom
- No. of episodes: 10

Production
- Running time: 30 minutes (incl. adverts)
- Production companies: Lion Television; Winning Moves

Original release
- Network: Channel 5
- Release: 8 September – 13 November 2008

Top Trumps is a 10-part British television series based on the card game of the same name. It aired on Channel 5 in 2008. It was produced by Lion Television and presented by Robert Llewellyn and Ashley Hames.

The show is a competition between the two presenters. Each chooses one type of the machines presented and found out facts about it. At the end of the show, each presenter chose two Trump factors to use in which they think their chosen machine will be best. A fifth trump factor gets randomly chosen. The winner is the one with most Trump factors.

== Topics ==
This is a list of the machines that were covered in the series:

- Episode 1: Super Yachts
- Episode 2: High Performance Planes
- Episode 3: Super Ships
- Episode 4: Fire Engines
- Episode 5: Warships
- Episode 6: All Terrain Vehicles
- Episode 7: Rescue Rigs
- Episode 8: Supercars
- Episode 9: Helicopters
- Episode 10: Mammoth Earth Movers

== See also ==
- Top Trumps
- Top Trumps Adventures
