= Robert Llewellyn =

British actor (born 1956)

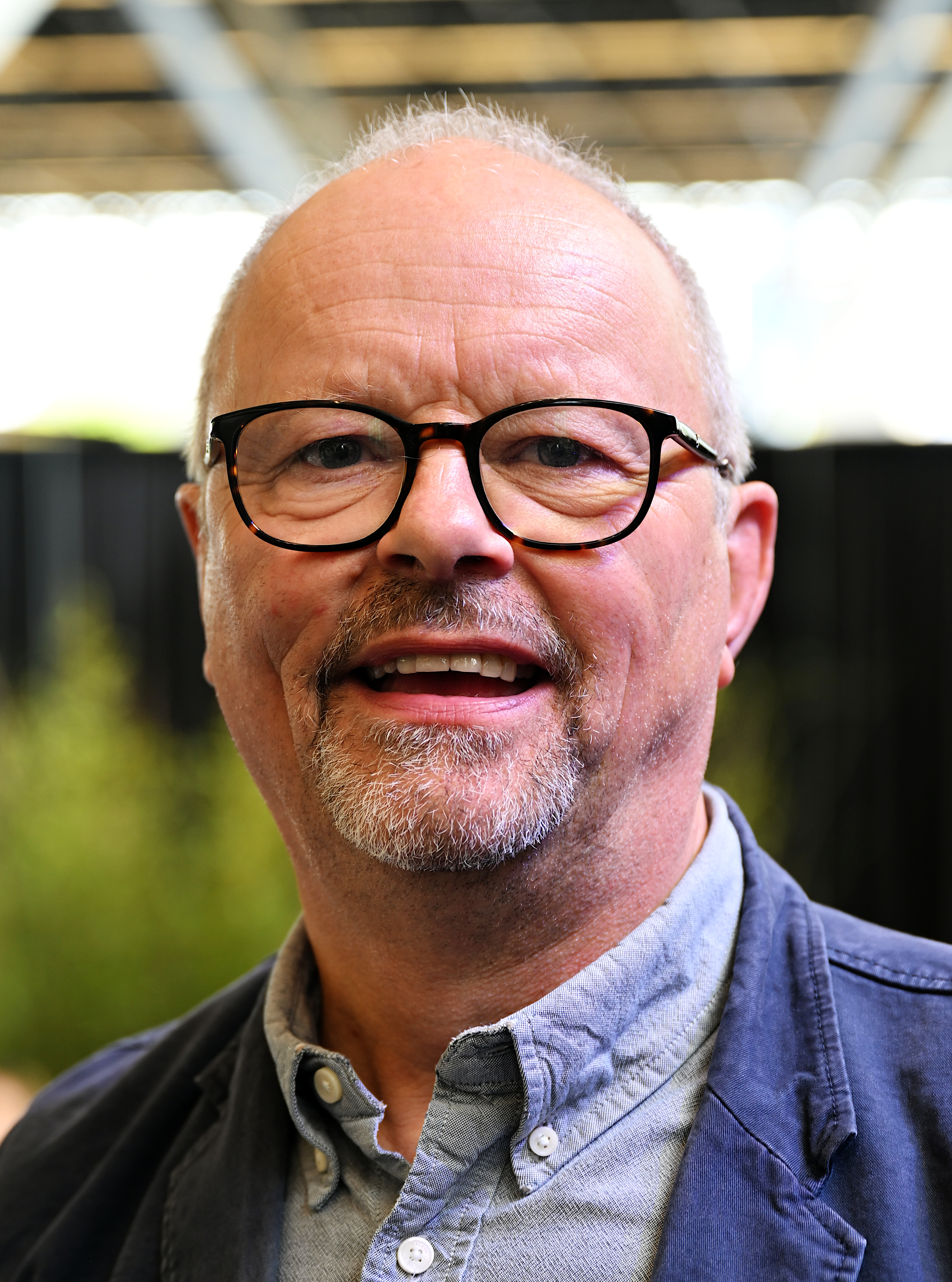
- Llewellyn in 2022
- Born: 10 March 1956 (age 70); Northampton, England
- Occupations: Actor; comedian; writer; presenter
- Years active: 1983–present
- Known for: Kryten in Red Dwarf; Scrapheap Challenge presenter
- Television: Red Dwarf; Scrapheap Challenge; How Do They Do It? Hollywood Science
- Spouse: Judy Pascoe
- Children: 2

Robert Llewellyn (born 10 March 1956) is a British actor, comedian, presenter, and writer. He plays the mechanoid Kryten in the sci-fi television sitcom Red Dwarf and presented the engineering gameshow Scrapheap Challenge. He also founded and hosts a YouTube channel, Everything Electric, which has grown into a company that puts on EV and "Everything Electric" conventions in the UK, USA, Canada, Australia, and Europe.

== Early life and career ==
Llewellyn was born in Northampton, England, and is of Welsh ancestry. His first foray into the world of showbusiness started out as a hobby, organising a few amateur cabaret evenings in a riverside warehouse overlooking Tower Bridge in London. The shows were a great success and he eventually helped form an alternative comedy theatre group called The Joeys. Within six months, he had stopped working as a shoemaker and started performing professionally with the group alongside Bernie Evans, Nigel Ordish and Graham Allum. The group toured Britain and France in the early 1980s, with an initial idea of exploring sexual politics between men. Llewellyn wrote much of the material, and also began writing novels. The Joeys split in 1985, having toured for years and done thousands of performances. He co-wrote and starred in The Corner House, a 1987 sitcom for Channel 4 about a café run by gay men.

== Red Dwarf ==
Llewellyn's involvement with Red Dwarf came about as a result of his appearance at the Edinburgh Festival Fringe, performing in his one-man comedy, Mammon, Robot Born of Woman, about a robot who, as he becomes more human, begins to behave increasingly badly. This was seen by Paul Jackson, producer of Red Dwarf, and Llewellyn was invited to audition for the role of Kryten.

Llewellyn joined the cast of Red Dwarf in 1989 at the start of the third series. Llewellyn's skills as a physical performer encouraged Rob Grant and Doug Naylor to write him additional characters for the series, namely Jim Reaper ("The Last Day"), Human Kryten ("DNA"), Bongo ("Dimension Jump"), Able ("Beyond A Joke") and the Data Doctor ("Back in the Red"). With Doug Naylor, Llewellyn also co-wrote the episode "Beyond A Joke" which screened in 1997.

In the early days of Red Dwarf, Llewellyn would arrive to do make-up many hours before the rest of the actors; however, that changed as time progressed, as his fellow actors "have a little bit more help in the makeup department than they used to". In an interview with The Skeptic Zone, Llewellyn mentioned that he needs a special pair of glasses to be able to read the script with the Kryten mask on. In Red Dwarf, he worked hard to get the more technically difficult lines right because the series tried to be factually accurate in reference to scientific theories.

Llewellyn was also the only British cast member of Red Dwarf to originally participate in a proposed American version, though other actors such as Craig Charles and Chris Barrie were also approached to reprise their roles.

== Other television work ==
Llewellyn has presented a number of programmes for UK television. His first outing as a presenter was on Scrapheap Challenge, produced by Channel 4; the series saw teams of engineers competing to build machines to complete a given task from materials scavenged from a scrapheap. His other presenting roles include a version of Discovery Channel's How Do They Do It? and the BBC/Open University programme Hollywood Science.

In 1992, Llewellyn appeared in "Parade", the fourth episode of series two of Bottom, as a wounded Falklands War veteran named Mr. N. Stiles.

Llewellyn's mockumentary it2i2, about artificial intelligence, was released on DVD in March 2006. Since then, he has had a YouTube video blog called "Llewtube". His book Sold Out: How I Survived a Year of Not Shopping — based on his YouTube series Making Do — was published in October 2008.

In February 2009, Llewellyn featured as a guest in episode 127 of the technology-related podcast MacBreak Weekly with Leo Laporte.

In 2007 Llewellyn appeared as the Prime Minister in an episode of the CBBC series M.I. High. He presented the 2008 Channel 5 game show Top Trumps.

Llewellyn reviewed the world of science and technology in his popular Machine of the Week report.

Since 2009 Llewellyn has provided the voice of news anchor Perry Flynn for PlayStation Home TV, which airs in the Home Theatre of the European version of PlayStation Home.

Llewellyn has worked as a voice actor, providing the voices of the alien creatures in Skywhales (1983), the voice of Feeble for The Feeble Files (1997), Old Joe in Christmas Carol: The Movie, and the gryphon in the 2005 film MirrorMask. In the documentary Dwarfing USA (released on the DVD of Red Dwarf V), he described himself as "very much a 'don't want to do it now' kind of person".

Llewellyn's web series Carpool ran from 2009 to 2014, and spawned a television series of the same name on the television channel Dave from 2010-2011. In January 2011, Llewellyn appeared on Celebrity Mastermind answering questions on the specialist subject of electric cars; he has expressed an interest in working on a television series about technologies that we might use in the future.

In 2010, Llewellyn was the narrator of the Channel 5 series The Boss is Coming to Dinner. He appeared in the 2013 movie Ashens and the Quest for the GameChild alongside Stuart Ashen and Warwick Davis, and the 2020 sequel, Ashens and the Polybius Heist.

Llewellyn presented the 2015 BBC Two show The World's Busiest Railway alongside Dan Snow and Anita Rani, which later featured on Netflix under the title Mumbai Railway.

In 2019, Llewellyn was a contestant alongside Craig Charles on the BBC One series Antiques Road Trip.

Currently working on a new 2025 show called "ZapHeap Challenge" - The modern take on the old-school game show Scrapheap Challenge, will see two teams engineer scrap material into electric-powered machines within a 10-hour timeframe

== Personal life ==
Prior to becoming a comedian, Llewellyn served an apprenticeship and became a professional shoemaker, working at James Taylor & Son and John Lobb Bootmaker in London. Speaking to Richard Herring, he said he still maintains an interest in the craft: "There is still a side of me that wants to develop a kind of 3D printed shoe thing...where you just put your foot in a thing, and you just get a shoe and it's there. And it fits absolutely exquisitely, immediately."

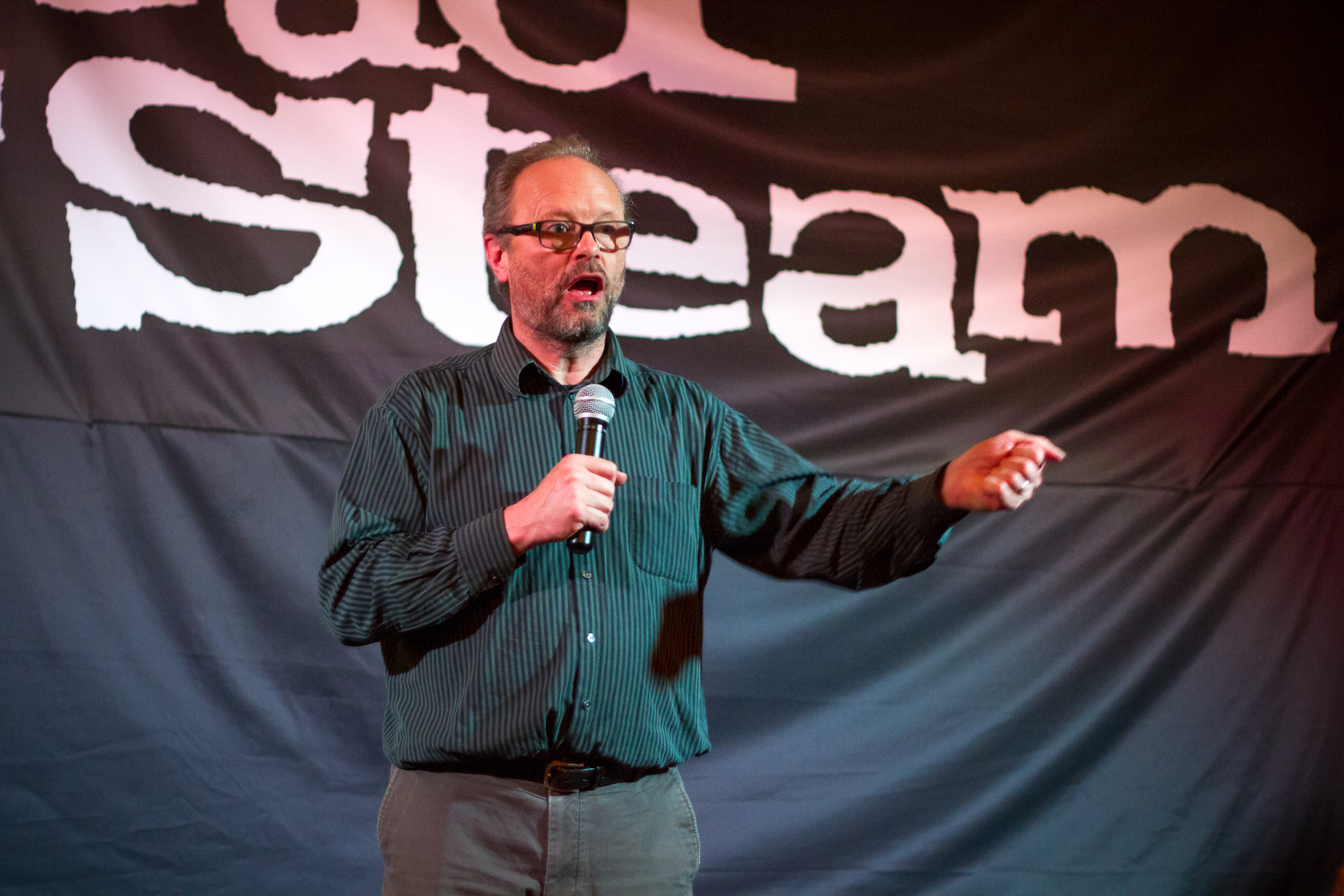
Robert Llewellyn talks to the Merseyside Skeptics Society 'Electric cars are rubbish. Aren't they?' event at the Head of Steam pub in Liverpool.

Llewellyn learned to drive aged 11 (having been taught by his older brother in a go-kart). Formerly a "petrol-head", he now drives an electric car and is a renewable energy advocate. As well as being frequently interviewed on the subject, he presents a YouTube channel called Everything Electric.

On the evening of 1 July 2009, while Llewellyn was en route to deliver Carpool footage to his editor, another vehicle hit him side-on at a junction in Gloucestershire, writing off his Toyota Prius and rendering him unconscious for around ten minutes. The force of the impact was such that it bent his laptop "into a banana shape". Llewellyn praised the honesty of the other driver for accepting full liability for the accident, as well as the hospital, police and other services for helping him. He also gave special praise to his "beloved Prius" for protecting him from the impact. He suffered concussion, minor whiplash and dizzy spells but escaped more serious injury.

In 2014, with David Peilow, he drove a Nissan Leaf 400 miles from London to Edinburgh. Stopping nine times, it took 12 hours, beating a previous time set by the BBC three years earlier which took four days in a Mini-E, as well as beating the time set by Peilow in a 2008 Tesla Roadster, which, having left two days after the Mini-E, took around 19 hours.

Llewellyn has expressed that his major pseudoscientific irritations are astrology and climate change denial.

Llewellyn lives in Temple Guiting, Gloucestershire and is married to Australian author Judy Pascoe (who herself had a small role in Red Dwarf as a one-off love interest of Llewellyn's character, in the episode "Camille" playing a character of the same name).

== Publications ==
=== Books ===
Llewellyn is the author of fourteen books, including Sold Out!, Therapy and How to Avoid It (with Nigel Planer) and seven novels.

- The Reconstructed Heart: How to Spot the Difference Between a Normal Man and One Who Does the Housework, is Great in Bed and Doesn't Get All Iffy When You Mention Words Like Love and Commitment (1992) – non-fiction
- The Man in the Rubber Mask (1994 - updated in 2012) – Llewellyn's personal account of his career with Red Dwarf.
- Therapy and How to Avoid It (1996 - with Nigel Planer) – non-fiction
- Thin He Was and Filthy-Haired (1996) – memoir
- The Man on Platform 5 (1998) – a modern gender-reversed re-telling of Pygmalion, of which the film rights were sold
- Punchbag (1999) – novel
- Sudden Wealth (2000) – novel
- Behind the Scenes at Scrapheap Challenge (2001) – non-fiction
- Brother Nature (2002) – novel
- Sold Out - How I Survived a Year of Not Shopping (2008) – non-fiction
- News From trilogy – utopian science fiction
  - News from Gardenia (2012 - Part 1)
  - News from the Squares (2013 - Part 2)
  - News from the Clouds (2015 - Part 3)
- Some Old Bloke: Recollections, Obsessions and the Joys of Blokedom (2018) – Autobiography

=== Video Podcasts ===
- Carpool – a regular video podcast, released every Friday, in which Llewellyn interviews other celebrities while driving them somewhere in a car. some of the episodes have appeared on UK channel Dave as well as appearing online after broadcast.
- Wet Liberal Whenever – was an occasional video podcast where he does a monologue about subjects he is impassioned about, previously known as Wet Liberal Weekly
- Fully Charged (previously known as Gearless) – a weekly video podcast that was initially about alternative technology vehicles and is now also about The future of Energy,

=== Other ===
- Woman Wizard – DVD of his one-man show
- Blue Helmet – online science fiction comedy novel
- Ashens and the Quest for the GameChild – an online independent film (direct to YouTube – low budget).
- the sequel, Ashens and the Polybius Heist - The sequel to the previous online film, slightly higher budget.
- in 2013, Llewellyn appeared as a guest on BBC Radio 4's The Museum of Curiosity, with Cleo Rocos and Kevin Warwick.
