= How Do They Do It? =

- UK Title Card
- Starring: Chris Broyles; Robert Llewellyn; Dominic Frisby; Rupert Degas; Iain Lee
- Countries of origin: Canada; United Kingdom
- Original language: English

Production
- Producers: Richard Stansfield; Kelly Hood (line)
- Running time: 60/30 minutes
- Production company: Wag TV

Original release
- Network: Discovery Channel; Science Channel (United States); Discovery Channel (United Kingdom)
- Release: 6 May 2006 – present

How Do They Do It? is a television series produced by Wag TV for Discovery Channel. Each programme explores how two or three ordinary objects are made and used. The show's slogan is "Behind the ordinary is the extraordinary." The series is broadcast throughout the world on various Discovery-owned networks including:

- Discovery Channel, Science Channel, DMAX and Quest in the United Kingdom;
- Science Channel in the United States;
- Discovery Channel in Asia, Australia, Belgium, Canada, France, Spain, Switzerland, and the Netherlands;
- Discovery Channel and Discovery Science in Italy.

Series 1 and 2, which were co-produced with Rocket Surgery Productions, were narrated by Rupert Degas; series 3 and 4 were narrated by Iain Lee; and series 5 and 6 were narrated by Dominic Frisby. In 2008, the UK's Channel 5 began airing the series, presented by Robert Llewellyn. This version was released on DVD in the UK in May 2010.

In the United States, the series airs on the Science Channel and is narrated by Chris Broyles.

This programme is similar to the popular Canadian-produced documentary programme, How It's Made, also broadcast on Discovery Channel networks.

== Episodes ==
=== Season 1 (2006) ===
Episodes in the first season aired with 60-minute runtimes (including commercials).

No. overall	No. in season	Title	Original release date
TBA	1	"Recycling, Plasma TV, Fireworks, Railroad tracks, Ink"	May 6, 2006
TBA	2	"Salt Mines, Sneakers, Ships, Watches, Wind Farms"	May 13, 2006
TBA	3	"Tires, Excavators, Newspapers, Ports, Contact Lenses"	May 27, 2006
TBA	4	"Internet Cable, Crane (machine), Pencils, Water, Toothpaste"	June 3, 2006
TBA	5	"Glass, Golf Balls, Zippers, Coke Cans, Tire changer"	June 10, 2006
TBA	6	"Concrete, Cell Phones, Lightbulbs, Steel, Traffic"	June 17, 2006

=== Season 2 (2006) ===
Episodes in the second season aired with 30-minute runtimes (including commercials).

No. overall	No. in season	Title	Original release date
TBA	1	"Diamond Mine, Skyscraper, Car Crusher"	June 24, 2006
TBA	2	"Air-to-Air Refuelling, Alpine skiing Slopes, Car Production"	June 24, 2006
TBA	3	"Ice Breaker, Money, Bowling Alleys"	July 8, 2006
TBA	4	"Mining Trucks, IKEA, Air Traffic"	July 8, 2006
TBA	5	"Logging, Baggage, Light Show"	July 15, 2006
TBA	6	"Gold, Golf Clubs, Escalators"	July 15, 2006
TBA	7	"Tunneling, Tea, Mountain Bikes"	July 22, 2006
TBA	8	"Combines, Lifeboats, Chocolate"	July 22, 2006
TBA	9	"Airbus, Fire Engines, Ketchup"	July 29, 2006
TBA	10	"Bicycle helmet, Rubber, Wave Piercing"	July 29, 2006
TBA	11	"Airbags, Ice Rinks, Mattresses"	August 12, 2006
TBA	12	"Armored Cars, Elevators, Cheese"	August 12, 2006

=== Season 3 (2007) ===
No. overall	No. in season	Title	Original release date
TBA	1	"Phoenix Stadium, La Trade Tower, Surfing"	February 21, 2007
TBA	2	"Space Shuttle, Roller Coaster, Pool table"	February 21, 2007
TBA	3	"Empire State Building, Extracting Copper, Making a Car"	February 28, 2007
TBA	4	"Fighter Jet, Baseball, Sports Car"	February 28, 2007
TBA	5	"Rescue Services, Falkirk Wheel, Parachutists"	March 7, 2007
TBA	6	"Submarine, Moving Earth, Beer Car"	March 7, 2007
TBA	7	"Racing Drivers, Bank vaults, Telling Time"	March 14, 2007
TBA	8	"Cruise Liner, White Wash, Aircon"	March 14, 2007
TBA	9	"Water Display, Space Shuttle, Suspension Bridge"	March 21, 2007
TBA	10	"Vehicles, Football, Potash Mine"	March 21, 2007
TBA	11	"Helicopter, Luxury Yachts, Highway Patrol"	March 28, 2007
TBA	12	"Buildings, Transmission tower, Balloon Makers"	March 28, 2007

=== Season 4 (2007) ===
No. overall	No. in season	Title	Original release date
TBA	1	"Bulletproof vests, Robots, Formation skydiving"	April 4, 2007
TBA	2	"Family Car, Letter, Titanium"	April 4, 2007
TBA	3	"Forest fires, Car exhaust, Telescopes"	April 11, 2007
TBA	4	"Spacesuit, Neon signs, Biggest Ships"	April 11, 2007
TBA	5	"Nuclear Submarine, Crash test dummy, Fruit and Veg"	April 18, 2007
TBA	6	"Surface mine, Air boats, Automated storage and retrieval system"	April 18, 2007
TBA	7	"Oil rigs, VWs, Black Box"	April 25, 2007
TBA	8	"Jet Engine, Weapons, Hurricanes from Space"	April 25, 2007

=== Season 5 (2008) ===
No. overall	No. in season	Title	Original release date
TBA	1	"Panama Canal, Waste disposal"	March 3, 2008
TBA	2	"World's Strongest Knife, Diamonds, Bricks"	March 4, 2008
TBA	3	"Electricity, Floating crane"	March 5, 2008
TBA	4	"Drinking water, Television screen, Family Cars"	March 6, 2008
TBA	5	"Overnight Parcel Delivery, Coal Mining"	March 7, 2008
TBA	6	"Tetra Pak, Pre-Fab Houses, Ambulances"	March 10, 2008
TBA	7	"Weather Forecasting, Hovercraft"	March 11, 2008
TBA	8	"Freeways, Mint (facility) Coins"	March 12, 2008
TBA	9	"Container Ship Estelle Maersk, Peterbilt Trucks"	March 13, 2008
TBA	10	"Windshield wipers, Space Shuttle, Binoculars"	March 14, 2008
TBA	11	"Transporting Oil Rigs, Electric razors"	March 17, 2008
TBA	12	"Halogen light bulb, Muffler, Locks"	March 18, 2008
TBA	13	"Airbus, Chainsaws"	March 19, 2008
TBA	14	"Hydroelectric dam, Silicon chips"	March 20, 2008
TBA	15	"Petrol, Swiss army knife"	March 25, 2008
TBA	16	"Carpets, Lego"	March 26, 2008
TBA	17	"Railways, Ballpoint pen"	March 27, 2008
TBA	18	"Mirrors, Wrapping"	March 28, 2008
TBA	19	"Jeans, Wine glasses"	March 31, 2008
TBA	20	"GPS, Aluminium foil"	April 1, 2008

=== Season 6 (2009) ===
No. overall	No. in season	Title	Original release date
TBA	1	"Artificial reefs, Earthquake-proof Buildings, Cars on Rocket Fuel"	August 10, 2009
TBA	2	"Blue Angels Airshows, Indoor Ski Slope, Sushi"	August 11, 2009
TBA	3	"Produce Power from Waste, Customize Supercars, Super Steel Swords"	August 12, 2009
TBA	4	"Cowboys Hats, Deep Sea Dive, Inflight Catering"	August 13, 2009
TBA	5	"De-Ice Planes, Glossy Magazines, Electric Sports Car"	August 14, 2009
TBA	6	"Satellites, Ship Maintenance, Making stretched limos"	August 17, 2009
TBA	7	"Mega Hotels, Lasers, Desert Golf."	August 18, 2009
How services are provided at one of the world's largest casinos and a look at how it is possible to build a golf course in the desert
TBA	8	"Orange Juice, Bending Glass, Solid Rock"	August 19, 2009
TBA	9	"Jumbo Garage, Nuclear Power, Pianos"	August 20, 2009
TBA	10	"G Suits, Smart Grid, Vehicle Slowdown"	August 21, 2009
TBA	11	"Make Assembly Line Robots, Seal Wine Bottles, Desalinate Sea Water"	August 24, 2009
TBA	12	"Design airplane parachutes, Create solar power, Make photochromic lenses"	August 25, 2009
TBA	13	"Blast Through Rock, Map Earth, Provide Flowers Year-Round"	August 26, 2009
TBA	14	"Work in 600-degree Heat, Make Champagne, Expand Ports"	August 27, 2009
TBA	15	"Manufacturing propellers, Intelligent cars, Turning metal into magnets"	August 28, 2009
TBA	16	"Large aquarium, Making sapphire, Bentlys"	August 31, 2009
TBA	17	"Traffic Control Systems, Mining Oil, Film Reconstruction."	September 1, 2009
TBA	18	"Batteries, Building an artificial island, Creating perfumes"	September 2, 2009
TBA	19	"Stainless steel, Making motorbikes, Making paper"	September 3, 2009
TBA	20	"Military helicopters, Metro systems, Engineering artificial reefs"	September 4, 2009

=== Season 7 (2010) ===
No. overall	No. in season	Title	Original release date
TBA	1	"Peanut Butter; Breaking Point (Household Device Safety Testing)"	September 5, 2010
TBA	2	"Irish Stout; Silk; Canned Soup"	September 5, 2010
TBA	3	"Fire Extinguishers; Cruise Ships"	September 12, 2010
TBA	4	"Diggers; A Taste of the Orient (Soy Sauce); Into the Sky (Willis Tower, Chicago)"	September 19, 2010
TBA	5	"Smooth as Marble; Hot Stuff/Umbrellas"	September 26, 2010
TBA	6	"Soft as Sponge; The Knowledge"	October 10, 2010
TBA	7	"Money Movers; Catch of the Day; Amazing Grace"	October 17, 2010
TBA	8	TBA	October 24, 2010
TBA	9	"Crash Testing; Books etc; Margarine"	October 31, 2010
TBA	10	TBA	November 7, 2010
TBA	11	TBA	November 14, 2010
TBA	12	TBA	November 21, 2010
TBA	13	"Car Batteries; Chocolate; Toothbrushes"	December 12, 2010
TBA	14	TBA	August 2010
TBA	15	"Decaf coffee; Smoked salmon; Water jets"	January 2, 2010
TBA	16	TBA	January 16, 2010
TBA	17	TBA	September 2010
TBA	18	TBA	November 29, 2010
TBA	19	TBA	February 6, 2010
TBA	20	TBA	December 20, 2010

=== Season 8 (2011) ===
No. overall	No. in season	Title	Original release date
TBA	1	"Pufferfish, Train hubs, Kilts"	September 5, 2011
TBA	2	TBA	September 5, 2011
TBA	3	TBA	September 12, 2011
TBA	4	TBA	September 19, 2011
TBA	5	TBA	September 26, 2011
TBA	6	TBA	October 10, 2011
TBA	7	TBA	October 17, 2011
TBA	8	TBA	October 24, 2011
TBA	9	TBA	October 31, 2011
TBA	10	TBA	November 7, 2011
TBA	11	TBA	November 14, 2011
TBA	12	TBA	November 21, 2011
TBA	13	TBA	December 12, 2011
TBA	14	TBA	August 2011
TBA	15	TBA	January 2, 2011
TBA	16	TBA	January 16, 2011
TBA	17	TBA	September 2011
TBA	18	TBA	November 29, 2011
TBA	19	TBA	February 6, 2011
TBA	20	TBA	December 20, 2011

=== Season 9 (2012) ===
No. overall	No. in season	Title	Original release date
TBA	2	"Leatherman; Formula 1; Glassware"	TBA
TBA	3	"(Mexican Panama) Hats; World's Longest Road Tunnel (Norway); Catching Pythons in Florida"	TBA
TBA	4	"Guacamole; Swamp Buggy; Scissors"	TBA
TBA	5	"Tennessee Whiskey; Nightvision; Saunas"	TBA
TBA	6	"World in Miniature (working airport); Hurricane Test Center; Growing rhubarb in the dark"	TBA
TBA	7	"Fighter Plane; Trappist Beers; SUV"	TBA
TBA	8	"Leather Footballs; Mussels; Helmet"	TBA
TBA	9	"Almonds; Snowblower; Detergents"	TBA
TBA	10	"Suspension Bridge; Crossbows; Stock Checking"	TBA
TBA	11	"Scania Trucks; Miracle Forensics; Gouda"	TBA
TBA	12	"Vanilla; Anchors; Lighters"	TBA
TBA	13	"(Classical) Guitars; Rope Access; Fast Tractor"	TBA
TBA	14	"Liferafts; Mind Control; Stamps"	TBA
TBA	15	"Tequila; Steam-Powered Megacity; Soft Ice-Cream"	TBA
TBA	16	"Stuntmen; Seabreacher; Amber"	TBA
TBA	17	"Tennis Balls; Surround Sound; Steak"	TBA
TBA	18	"Rayon; Snuff; Cola"	TBA
TBA	19	"The Social Network; Zubrowka; Aerial Cable Cars"	TBA
TBA	20	"Skydiving Suits; Surstromming; Hemp-Crete"	TBA
TBA	21	"Chewing Gum; Fish Hooks; Legoland"	TBA

=== Season 10 (2012) ===
No. overall	No. in season	Title	Original release date
TBA	1	TBA	September 5, 2012
TBA	2	TBA	September 5, 2012
TBA	3	TBA	September 12, 2012
TBA	4	TBA	September 19, 2012
TBA	5	TBA	September 26, 2012
TBA	6	TBA	October 10, 2012
TBA	7	TBA	October 17, 2012
TBA	8	"Harp Strings, Roof Windows, Belgian Waffles"	October 24, 2012
TBA	9	TBA	October 31, 2012
TBA	10	TBA	November 7, 2012
TBA	11	TBA	November 14, 2012
TBA	12	TBA	November 21, 2012
TBA	13	TBA	December 12, 2012
TBA	14	"High Rise Construction, Dr Marten Boots, Cooking Pans"	August 2012
TBA	15	TBA	January 2, 2012
TBA	16	TBA	January 16, 2012
TBA	17	"Mohair, Quadskis, The Harp"	September 2012
TBA	18	"Rayon, Snuff, Cola"	November 29, 2012
TBA	19	TBA	February 6, 2012
TBA	20	"Chewing Gum, Fish Hooks, Legoland"	December 20, 2012

=== Season 11 (2013) ===
No. overall	No. in season	Title	Original release date
TBA	1	"Opal, Stunt planes, Nougat"	September 5, 2013
TBA	2	"Toilet Paper, Absinthe, Cricket balls"	September 5, 2013
TBA	3	"Locomotives, Clotted Cream, Boomerangs"	September 12, 2013
TBA	4	"Sardines, scooters, Erector Sets"	September 19, 2013
TBA	5	"Salad, Rope, Insulin"	September 26, 2013
TBA	6	"Plane Painting, Clogs, Pasties"	October 10, 2013
TBA	7	"Paris Sewers, Beretta, Cotton Apparel"	October 17, 2013
TBA	8	"Bells, Hurricane Clean-up, Dates"	October 24, 2013
TBA	9	"Russian Dolls, Aloe vera, Flags"	October 31, 2013
TBA	10	"Cartoonists' Ink, False Eyes, Ball Bearings"	November 7, 2013
TBA	11	"Saffron, Ice roads, Shelby cars"	November 14, 2013
TBA	12	"Titan Tires, Espresso, Diamond Cutting"	November 21, 2013
TBA	13	"Chinamax, Russian Standard (vodka), Abalone"	December 12, 2013
TBA	14	"Wrecker trucks, Roquefort cheese, Tree Moving"	December 19, 2013
TBA	15	"Pistachios, Forbidden City, Radar"	January 2, 2014
TBA	16	"Marble, Mah-Jongg, Escape Slides"	January 16, 2014
TBA	17	"Argan oil, KamAZ trucks, Canton Tower"	January 23, 2014
TBA	18	"Civet coffee, St Petersburg Metro, Chip Makers"	January 30, 2014
TBA	19	"Leather, The Grand Canal, Flyboard"	February 6, 2014

=== Season 12 (2014) ===
No. overall	No. in season	Title	Original release date
TBA	1	"Parmesan, Runways, Reclining Chairs"	July 15, 2014
TBA	2	"Carpets, Skis, Niagara Power"	July 22, 2014
TBA	3	"Nori, Beer Bottles, Shark Deterrents"	July 29, 2014
TBA	4	"Brass, Ice Patrol, Penjing"	August 5, 2014
TBA	5	"Racing Bikes, Stunt Pilots, Oil Well"	August 12, 2014
TBA	6	"Bagels, Racing Tires, Liuli Glass"	August 19, 2014
TBA	7	"Venice Trash, Sheepskin Boots, Chlorella"	August 26, 2014
TBA	8	"Turkish delight, Silver, Sunscreen"	September 3, 2014
TBA	9	"Canvas, Stinky Tofu, Bottle Recycling"	September 10, 2014
TBA	10	"Beekeeping, Trikes, Body Armour"	September 17, 2014
TBA	11	"Heat Proof Glass, ATMs, Pagani"	October 10, 2014
TBA	12	"Aquavit, Motocycle Leathers, Cathedral"	October 17, 2014
TBA	13	"Dock Cranes, Plastic Bags, Baubles"	October 24, 2014
TBA	14	"Balsamic Vinegar, Drysuits, Stunt Plane"	October 24, 2014
TBA	15	"Steel, Wool, Kiteboards"	November 7, 2014
TBA	16	"Plaster, Awards, Special Forces Plane"	November 28, 2014
TBA	17	"Car Windows, Lipstick, Sheep Shears"	December 5, 2014
TBA	18	"Applejack, Aircraft Seat Test, Batteries"	December 12, 2014
TBA	19	"Nickel, Locks, Bubble Tea"	December 19, 2014

=== Season 13 (2015) ===
No. overall	No. in season	Title	Original release date
TBA	1	"Logging, Tiles & Jaffa Cakes"	May 7, 2015
TBA	2	"Heavy Lift Plane, Hunting Boots, Bananas"	May 14, 2015
Assembling an advanced plane; making warm, waterproof boots. Also: how they get bananas just ripe.
TBA	3	"Monorail, Royal Copenhagen Porcelain & New York Cupcakes"	May 21, 2015
TBA	4	"Wine, Gore-Tex Extreme Weather Clothing"	May 28, 2015
TBA	5	"Screws, Marmalade & Printed Dresses"	June 4, 2015
TBA	6	"Road Rollers, Canned Bread & Vertu Phones"	June 11, 2015
TBA	7	"Tinned Grapefruit, Snowmaking and Conveyor Belts"	June 18, 2015
TBA	8	"Harp Strings, Roof Windows & Belgian waffle"	July 2, 2015
TBA	9	"AGA cooker, Incense Sticks and Jenever"	July 9, 2015
TBA	10	"Robo-farm, Log Stacker & Piano Moving"	July 23, 2015
TBA	11	"Bamboo scaffolding & Fireworks"	July 30, 2015
TBA	12	"Espadrille, Prefabricated Houses and Underground Storage"	July 6, 2015
TBA	13	"Macadamia Nuts, Tap Water & Crowd control barrier"	August 13, 2015
TBA	14	"High Rise Construction, Dr. Martens Boots & Cookware and bakeware"	August 20, 2015
TBA	15	"Sitar, Biltong & Bulldozers"	August 27, 2015
TBA	16	"Fedoras, Cement & Frozen Peas"	September 3, 2015
TBA	17	"Mohair, Gibbs Quadski and the Harp"	September 10, 2015
TBA	18	"Rooibos, Baggage handling system & Hairbrushes"	September 17, 2015
TBA	19	"Credit Cards, Tiffin and Boat Lift"	September 24, 2015
TBA	20	"Power Tunnel, Pizza oven and Wendy house"	October 1, 2015

=== Season 14 (2016) ===
No. overall	No. in season	Title	Original release date
TBA	1	"Drinks Cans, Cuckoo Clocks, and Paddle Boardss"	August 8, 2016
How drinks cans are made; how cuckoo clocks are made and how paddle boards are crafted.
TBA	2	"Longboards, Lemonade, and Forklifts"	August 15, 2016
How longboards are made; how lemons are turned into lemonade; and how forklifts are built.
TBA	3	"Coffee, Bricks, Lava Lamps, and Diamonds"	August 22, 2016
How coffee is roasted; how bricks are built; how lava lamps are made; and how diamonds are mined from an extinct volcano.
TBA	4	"Cameras, Big Airbags, and Jelly Beans"	August 29, 2016
How the world's sharpest photos are taken; what it takes to create an airbag that can catch a falling car; and how jelly beans are made.
TBA	5	"Caravans, Tuning forks, Ice resurfacers, and Festival of Lights"	September 5, 2016
Included: caravans; tuning forks; ice resurfacers; and Festival of Lights.
TBA	6	"Vinyl Records, Bumper Cars, and Tiger Balm"	September 12, 2016
Vinyl records, bumper cars and tiger balm are featured.
TBA	7	"Non-alcoholic Beer, Tomcars, Escalators, and Lie detectors"	September 19, 2016
How non-alcoholic beer, Tomcars, escalators and lie detectors are made.
TBA	8	"Axes, Messenger bags, and Fast-Rescue Boats"	October 3, 2016
How axes, messenger bags and fast-rescue boats are made.
TBA	9	"Wensleydale Cheese, Paintbrushes, Eucalyptus Oil, and Plastic Wrap"	October 10, 2016
How Wensleydale cheese, paintbrushes, eucalyptus oil and plastic wrap are made.
TBA	10	"Tesla Model S, horse tail fabrics & Automated pool cleaner"	October 17, 2016
Tesla Model S, horse tail fabrics, clean the largest swimming pools
TBA	11	"Pianos, Electronic impact drills, Gears and Aircraft chairs"	November 6, 2016
TBA	12	"Electric Toothbrushes, Stamps, and Motorcycle"	November 6, 2016
TBA	13	"Electronic door locks, Fiat Sedici E, and Deli Meats"	November 13, 2016
TBA	14	"Cars Machines, Slot Machines, Pinball Machines, and Boomerangs"	November 13, 2016
TBA	15	"Bicycles, Racing Cars, Fire Extinguishers, and Banjos"	November 20, 2016
TBA	16	"Kitchen shears, Airlines, Asphalt Tinola, and Power Tunnel"	November 20, 2016
TBA	17	"Watches, Icons, and Luxury cars"	November 27, 2016
TBA	18	"Paper flowers, Formula 1, MotoGP, and NASCAR"	November 27, 2016
TBA	19	"Violins, Einesk, and Barber chairs"	December 4, 2016
TBA	20	"Laminate, Racing Atletism, Motor Diesel, and Drums"	December 4, 2016

=== Season 15 (2017) ===
No. overall	No. in season	Title	Original release date
TBA	1	"Satellites, Robotic medication dispensers, Incense cones, Skoda Fabia K."	August 28, 2017
TBA	2	"Mouth fish phines, Dolls, Tattoos & Motorcycle blocks"	September 26, 2017
TBA	3	"FLONs, Change Machines, Car machines, and Sugar"	October 6, 2017
TBA	4	"Iveco Trucks, Diesel Filters, and Walking Canes"	October 23, 2017
TBA	5	"Zaccer, Road Cases, Candy canes and Rally cars"	October 23, 2017
TBA	6	"Drinking, DAF Trucks, Luxury Watches and Nail clippers"	October 28, 2017
TBA	7	"Asphalt Ringier, Uranium, Macaroons, and Pills"	November 9, 2017
TBA	8	"Electric Sports, Sushi, Soy Sauce, and Detergents"	November 27, 2017
TBA	9	"MAN Trucks, Oil, Gin and KIA R Electric"	November 29, 2017
TBA	10	"Paper fans, Asphalt power, Tea, and Bassoons"	December 9, 2017
TBA	11	"SEK, Lime chairs, Diesel blocks, and chandeliers"	December 12, 2017

=== Season 16 ===
No. overall	No. in season	Title	Original release date
TBA	1	"Peppermint Oil, Tennis Rackets, Desalination"	June 13, 2019
TBA	2	"Trombones, Wineskins, Peat Beauty Cream"	June 13, 2019
TBA	3	"Surfboards, Satchels, Butter"	June 20, 2019
TBA	4	"Horse Transport By Air, Chess Sets, Food Photography"	June 20, 2019
TBA	5	"Stainless Steel, Combination Locks, Indian Jaggery Sugar"	June 27, 2019
TBA	6	"Geoduck Clams, Vintage Steam Trains, Water Polo Hats"	June 27, 2019
TBA	7	"Bufori cars, whistle, paprika"	July 4, 2019
TBA	8	"Pile driver, cricket bat, hand fan"	July 4, 2019
TBA	9	"Tractors, Cow Bells, Street Lights"	July 11, 2019
TBA	10	"Birds Nest Soup, Rowing Oars, Castanets"	July 11, 2019
TBA	11	"Turbo Chargers, Plastic Roads, Kites"	July 18, 2019
TBA	12	"Boat Sails, Military Swords, Children Car Seats"	July 18, 2019
TBA	13	"Marshall Amplifiers, Clay Graden Pots, Book Rebinding"	July 25, 2019
TBA	14	"High Rise Window Cleaners, Jigsaw Puzzles, Field Hockey Sticks"	July 25, 2019
TBA	15	"RV Motorhomes, Lollipops, Ballet Shoes"	August 1, 2019
TBA	16	"Mushroom Farming, Map Making, Medical Gloves"	August 1, 2019
TBA	17	"Polysulphate Fertilizer, Maple Syrup, Batik Printed Fabrics"	August 8, 2019
TBA	18	"Basmati Microwave Rice, Automaton Singing Bird Boxes, British Life Guards Uniforms"	August 8, 2019
TBA	19	"Hearing Aids, Elizabeth Line Trains, Shadow Puppets"	August 15, 2019
TBA	20	"Remote Controlled Submersibles, Steiff Teddy Bears, Indian Cheese Paneer"	August 15, 2019

=== Special ===
Episodes 60 minutes long taken the best from series 3 and 4

No.	Title	Original release date
1	"Fighter Jet, Moving Earth, Telescopes, Black Box, Space Shuttle"	September 3, 2007
2	"Extracting Copper, Empire State Building, Nuclear Sub, Rescue Services, Biggest Ships"	September 4, 2007

=== FIVE (UK) version ===
==== Series 1 ====
Each episode is 30 minutes long and airs on terrestrial UK channel five. Each programme features 2 items from the original series with 1 new item filmed with presenter Robert Llewellyn. Llewellyn also presents links in between the original items.

No. overall	No. in season	Title	Original release date
TBA	1	"Excavators, London's sewers, Tyres"	January 10, 2008
TBA	2	"Salt mine, hovercraft, training shoes"	January 17, 2008
TBA	3	"Lightbulbs, demolition with explosives, giant cranes"	January 24, 2008
TBA	4	"Cold War Military Recycling, the perfect Martini, plasma TVs"	January 31, 2008
TBA	5	"Fibre Optics, Movements of Goods, zips"	February 4, 2008
TBA	6	"Fireworks, Limestone, Rail Tracks"	February 11, 2008
TBA	7	"Pencils, Pilot a Cargo Ship, Golfballs"	February 18, 2008
TBA	8	"Thames Barrier, Newspaper Recycling, Glassmaking"	February 25, 2008
TBA	9	"High Speed Racing Boat, Mobile Phones, Kugira"	March 3, 2008
TBA	10	"Recycling, Self Winding Watches, Flat Pack Tanker"	March 10, 2008

==== Series 2 ====
No. overall	No. in season	Title	Original release date
TBA	1	"Mid-Air Refuelling, Skyscrapers, Tea"	March 17, 2008
TBA	2	"Airbags, Internet Shopping, Car Recycling"	March 24, 2008
TBA	3	"Ice Breaker Ships, Bells, Rubber Bands"	March 31, 2008
TBA	4	"Diamond Mines, Electricity from Coal, Ten-Pin Bowling"	April 7, 2008
TBA	5	"Wood Harvesting, Car Transportation, Confectionery"	April 14, 2008
TBA	6	"Resilient Banknotes, Art of Falconry, Largest Lorry"	April 21, 2008
TBA	7	"Armoured Car, Thames Cleaning, IKEA"	April 28, 2008
TBA	8	"Combine Harvester, Satellites, Crash Helmet"	May 5, 2008
TBA	9	"Gold Mining, Fire Resistant Materials, Skyscraper Lifts"	May 12, 2008
TBA	10	"Airbus 380, Pit Stops under 10 Seconds, Tomato Ketchup"	May 19, 2008

==== Series 3 ====
No. overall	No. in season	Title	Original release date
TBA	1	"High-Speed Catamarans, Stunt Planes, Contact Lenses"	October 9, 2008
TBA	2	"Channel Tunnel, Escalators, Car Production"	October 16, 2008
TBA	3	"Aluminium Cans, Steam Locomotive, Golf Clubs"	23 October 2008
TBA	4	"Tugboat, Water Drilling, Mountain Bike"	October 30, 2008
TBA	5	"Lancashire Fire Service, Traffic-Management, Gigantic Tunneling Machine"	November 6, 2008
TBA	6	"Marmite, Uncapsizable Lifeboat, Energy-Efficient Lightbulb"	November 13, 2008
TBA	7	"Steel Works, Recycling Rubbish into Compost, Wensleydale Cheese"	November 20, 2008
TBA	8	"Thames Water Ring, Wind Farm, Ice-Surfacing Machine"	November 27, 2008
TBA	9	"Heathrow Luggage, Golf Course, Printer Cartridges"	December 4, 2008
TBA	10	"American Fire Engines, Oil Refinery, Air Traffic Control"	December 11, 2008

==== Series 4 ====
Series 4 does not feature a specially shot item with presenter Robert Llewellyn; instead this is a reversion of the Discovery Channel series 5 with filmed links presented by Robert between the items. This series was not made available on Five's online video site.

No. overall	No. in season	Title	Original release date
TBA	1	"Panama Canal, Waste Disposal"	16 August 2010
TBA	2	"World's Strongest Knife, Diamonds, Bricks"	23 August 2010
TBA	3	"Live pylon repairs, Floating Crane"	6 September 2010
TBA	4	"Drinking Water, Television Screens, Luxury Cars"	13 September 2010
TBA	5	"Overnight Parcel Delivery, Coal Mining"	20 September 2010
TBA	6	"Tetra Pak, Pre-Fab Houses, Ambulances"	27 September 2010
TBA	7	"Sat Nav, Aluminium foil"	4 October 2010
TBA	8	"Carpet, Lego"	11 October 2010
TBA	9	"Container Ship Estelle Maersk, Peterbilt Trucks"	18 October 2010
TBA	10	"Windshield wipers, Space Shuttle, Binoculars"	20 October 2010
TBA	11	"Transporting Oil Rigs, Electric Razors"	25 October 2010
TBA	12	"Halogen light bulbs, Mufflers, Locks"	27 October 2010
TBA	13	"Airbus, Chainsaws"	1 November 2010
TBA	14	"Mirrors, Car Wrapping Labels"	8 November 2010
TBA	15	"Jeans, Wine Glasses"	15 November 2010
TBA	16	"Freeways Construction, Minting Coins"	22 November 2010
TBA	17	"Railways, Ballpoint pens"	29 November 2010
TBA	18	"Hydroelectric Dam, Silicon Chips"	4 December 2010
TBA	19	"Petrol, Swiss Army Knife"	13 December 2010
TBA	20	"Weather Forecasting, Hovercraft"	20 December 2010

==== Series 5 ====
Series 5 does not feature a specially shot item with presenter Robert Llewellyn; instead this is a reversion of the Discovery Channel series 6 with filmed links presented by Llewellyn between the items. This series was not made available on 5's online video site.

No. overall	No. in season	Title	Original release date
TBA	1	"Blue Angels Airshows, Indoor Ski Slope, Sushi"	4 January 2011
TBA	2	"Artificial Reefs, Earthquake-proof Buildings, Cars on Rocket Fuel"	10 January 2011
TBA	3	"De-Ice Planes, Glossy Magazines, Electric Sports Car"	17 January 2011
TBA	4	"De-Make Assembly Line Robots, Seal Wine Bottles, Desalinatize Sea Water"	20 January 2011
TBA	5	"Design Airplane Parachutes, Create Solar Power, Make Photochromic Lenses"	24 January 2011
TBA	6	"Cowboys Hats, Deep Sea Dive, Inflight Catering"	27 January 2011
TBA	7	"Stainless steel, Making motorbikes, Making paper"	31 January 2011
TBA	8	"Blast Through Rock, Map Earth, Provide Flowers Year-Round"	7 February 2011
TBA	9	"Large aquarium, Making sapphire, Bentlys"	14 February 2011
TBA	10	"Satellites, Ship Maintenance, Making stretched limos"	21 February 2011
TBA	11	"Batteries, Building an artificial island, Creating perfumes"	28 February 2011
TBA	12	"Jumbo Garage, Nuclear Power, Pianos"	7 March 2011
TBA	13	"Produce Power from Waste, Customize Supercars, Super Steel Swords"	14 March 2011
TBA	14	"Manufacturing propellers, Intelligent cars, Turning metal into magnets"	21 March 2011
TBA	15	"Traffic Control Systems, Mining Oil, Film Reconstruction"	28 March 2011
TBA	16	"Mega Hotels, Lasers, Desert Golf"	4 April 2011
TBA	17	"Orange Juice, Bending Glass, Solid Rock"	11 April 2011
TBA	18	"Work in 600-degree Heat, Make Champagne, Expand Ports"	18 April 2011
TBA	19	"G Suits, Smart Grid, Vehicle Slowdown"	9 May 2011
TBA	20	"Military helicopters, Metro systems, Engineering artificial reefs"	16 May 2011

=== Science Channel ===
==== Season Unknown ====
Episodes in this group aired with 30-minute runtimes (including commercials). On hiatus as of February 2014.

No. overall	No. in season	Title	Original release date
TBA	1	"Leather Pouf Ottomans, The Grand Canal (China), FlyBoards"	February 6, 2014
