= Vanda Dendrobium =

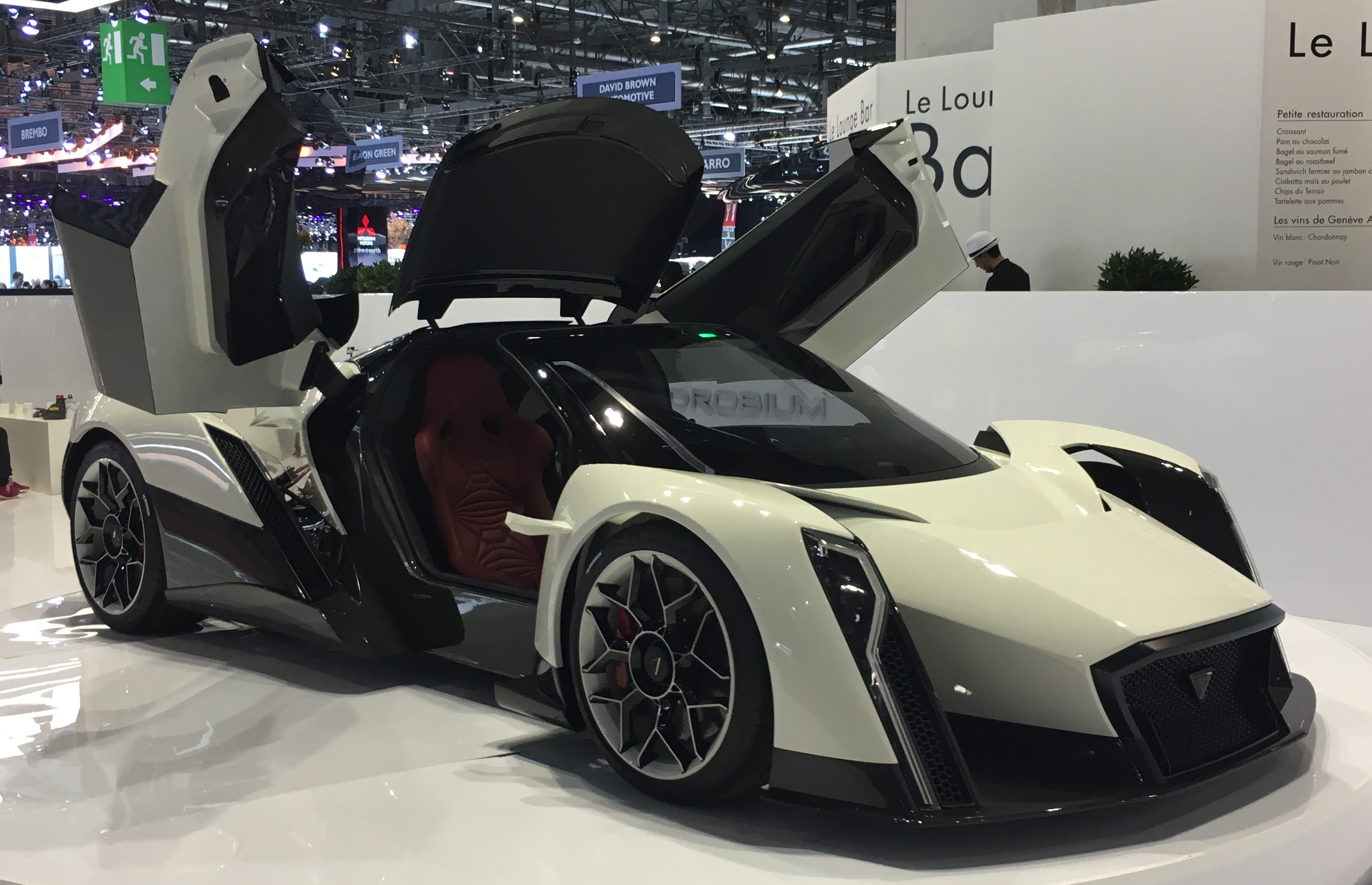

Overview
- Manufacturer: Vanda Electrics
- Production: 2017 (concept car)

Body and chassis
- Class: Sports car (S)
- Body style: 2-door coupé

The Vanda Dendrobium is an electric sports car built by the Singaporean car manufacturer Vanda Electrics. A concept version was presented in 2017.

== History ==
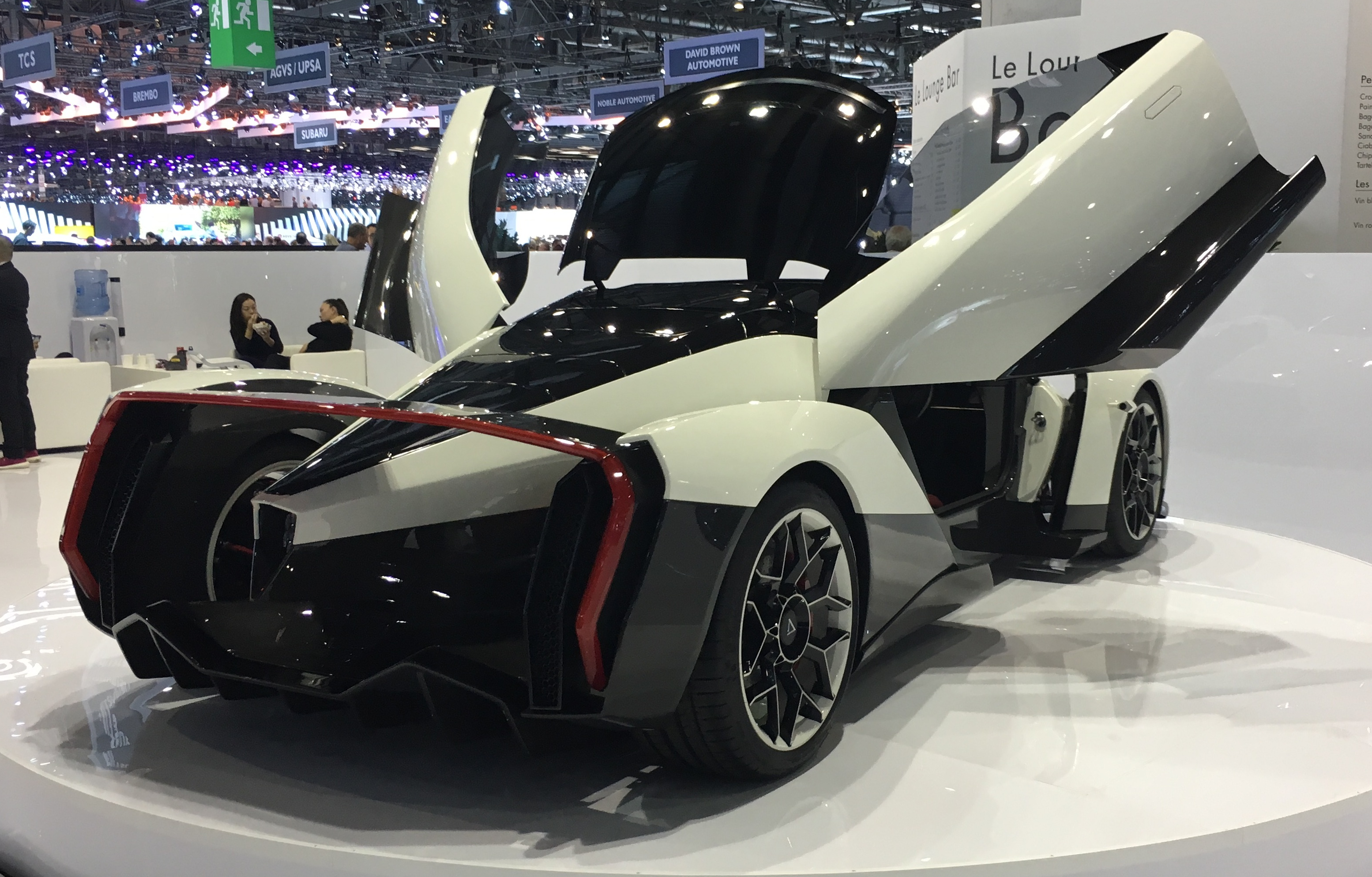
Rear 3/4 view

The Dendrobium concept was presented in 2017 at the Geneva Motor Show. The car was developed in collaboration with Williams Engineering, the Technology and Engineering department of Williams Group.

It has a claimed maximum speed of 320 km/h (200 mph).

The car appears in Asphalt 8: Airborne as a high-end Class C car and Asphalt Legends as a mid Class A car.
