= In Motion =

In Motion may refer to:

== Music ==
- In Motion (Copeland album), 2005
- In Motion (David Becker Tribune album), 1991
- In Motion (Joey Yung album), 2008
- In Motion (Richard Poole, Gary Peacock, and Marilyn Crispell album), 2016
- In Motion: The Remixes, an album by Amy Grant, 2014
- "In Motion" (Allday song), 2017
- "In Motion" (hide song), 2002

== Other uses ==
- In Motion (film), a 2002 Russian drama film directed by Filipp Yankovsky
- InMotion, a Dutch student electric-car racing team
- InMotion Group, a New Zealand bus and ferry transport company
- InMotion stores, an airport technology store brand owned by WH Smith

== See also ==
- Man in Motion (disambiguation)
