= Masters of Formula 3 =

Former annual Formula 3 race

- Circuit Park Zandvoort

Race information
- Number of times held: 24
- First held: 1991
- Last held: 2016
- Most wins (drivers): (Finland) V. Bottas (2) (Sweden) F. Rosenqvist (2)
- Most wins (constructors): Dallara (22)
- Circuit length: 4.307 km (2.676 miles)
- Race length: 107.675 km (66.90 miles)
- Laps: 25

Last race (2016)

Pole position
- (United Kingdom) Callum Ilott; Van Amersfoort Racing; 1:29.820

Podium
- 1. (Sweden) J. Eriksson; Motopark; 2. (Finland) N. Kari; Motopark; 3. (Brazil) Sérgio Sette Câmara; Motopark

Fastest lap
- (China) G. Zhou; Motopark; 1:31.709

The Masters of Formula 3 was a Formula Three race held annually, usually at the Circuit Park Zandvoort in the Netherlands. Due to noise restrictions in the Zandvoort area, the 2007 and 2008 races were held in the Belgian circuit of Zolder. However, it returned to Zandvoort for the 2009 race.

The Masters was first started in 1991, as an international meeting between drivers from various national championships across Europe. As the FIA European Formula Three Cup had been cancelled after the 1990 season, the Masters became the unofficial European F3 championship. Many of Formula One's future stars raced and won in the Masters, including David Coulthard, who was crowned champion in the first event.

In 1999, the FIA nominated the Pau round of French Formula Three Championship as the new European Cup, but the Masters retained its status as the de facto international meeting between up-and-coming superstars all across Europe, as drivers from the British, French, German and Italian championships continued to flock to the Dutch track. When the French and German series were merged into the Formula 3 Euro Series in 2003, the Masters was not included in the calendar at the time, but its position as the premier international F3 meeting in Europe was not threatened.

The event was sponsored by Marlboro from 1991 to 2005. When tobacco advertising was banned in the European Union after 31 July 2005, the Masters lost its sponsorship. The race was sponsored by BP Ultimate took from 2006 to 2007, RTL in 2008, Tango in 2009 and RTL again in 2010.

For the first time since its creation the series took a one-year break in 2017 due to calendar changes on the circuit and FIA Formula 3 European Championship regulations which prohibits any racing activity prior the round on the same circuit. But the race did not return in 2018, which made the 2016 race the final race of the event.

== Results ==
List of Masters of Formula 3 winners
Year	Winner	Entrant	Chassis – Engine	Main Series	Race Track	Circuit Map
1991	(United Kingdom) David Coulthard	(United Kingdom) Paul Stewart Racing	Ralt RT35-Mugen-Honda	British Formula 3 Championship	Circuit Zandvoort	
1992	(Portugal) Pedro Lamy	(Germany) Opel Team WTS	Reynard 923-Opel	German Formula Three Championship	Circuit Zandvoort	
1993	(Netherlands) Jos Verstappen	(Germany) Opel Team WTS	Dallara F393-Opel	German Formula Three Championship	Circuit Zandvoort	
1994	(United Kingdom) Gareth Rees	(United Kingdom) Alan Docking Racing	Dallara F394-Mugen-Honda	British Formula 3 Championship	Circuit Zandvoort	
1995	(Argentina) Norberto Fontana	(Switzerland) KMS	Dallara F395-Opel	German Formula Three Championship	Circuit Zandvoort	
1996	(Belgium) Kurt Mollekens	(United Kingdom) Alan Docking Racing	Dallara F396-Mugen-Honda	British Formula 3 Championship	Circuit Zandvoort	
1997	(Netherlands) Tom Coronel	(United Kingdom) Alan Docking Racing	Dallara F397-Toyota	All-Japan Formula Three Championship	Circuit Zandvoort	
1998	(Belgium) David Saelens	(France) ASM Fina	Dallara F396-Renault	French Formula Three Championship	Circuit Zandvoort	
1999	(United Kingdom) Marc Hynes	(United Kingdom) Manor Motorsport	Dallara F399-Mugen-Honda	British Formula 3 Championship	Circuit Zandvoort	
2000	(France) Jonathan Cochet	(France) Signature Competition	Dallara F399-Renault	French Formula Three Championship	Circuit Zandvoort	
2001	(Japan) Takuma Sato	(United Kingdom) Carlin Motorsport	Dallara F301-Mugen-Honda	British Formula 3 Championship	Circuit Zandvoort	
2002	(Brazil) Fabio Carbone	(United Kingdom) Fortec Motorsport	Dallara F302-Renault	British Formula 3 Championship	Circuit Zandvoort	
2003	(Austria) Christian Klien	(Germany) ADAC Berlin Brandenburg	Dallara F302-Mercedes	Formula 3 Euro Series	Circuit Zandvoort	
2004	(France) Alexandre Prémat	(France) ASM Formule 3	Dallara F304-Mercedes	Formula 3 Euro Series	Circuit Zandvoort	
2005	(United Kingdom) Lewis Hamilton	(France) ASM Formule 3	Dallara F305-Mercedes	Formula 3 Euro Series	Circuit Zandvoort	
2006	(United Kingdom) Paul di Resta	(France) ASM Formule 3	Dallara F305-Mercedes	Formula 3 Euro Series	Circuit Zandvoort	
2007	(Germany) Nico Hülkenberg	(France) ASM Formule 3	Dallara F305-Mercedes	Formula 3 Euro Series	Circuit Zolder	
2008	(France) Jules Bianchi	(France) ART Grand Prix	Dallara F308-Mercedes	Formula 3 Euro Series	Circuit Zolder	
2009	(Finland) Valtteri Bottas	(France) ART Grand Prix	Dallara F308-Mercedes	Formula 3 Euro Series	Circuit Zandvoort	
2010	(Finland) Valtteri Bottas	(France) ART Grand Prix	Dallara F308-Mercedes	Formula 3 Euro Series	Circuit Zandvoort	
2011	(Sweden) Felix Rosenqvist	(Germany) Mücke Motorsport	Dallara F308-Mercedes	Formula 3 Euro Series	Circuit Zandvoort	
2012	(Spain) Daniel Juncadella	(Italy) Prema Powerteam	Dallara F312-Mercedes	FIA Formula 3 European Championship	Circuit Zandvoort	
2013	(Sweden) Felix Rosenqvist	(Germany) KFZ‐Teile24 Mücke Motorsport	Dallara F312-Mercedes	FIA Formula 3 European Championship	Circuit Zandvoort	
2014	(Netherlands) Max Verstappen	(Germany) Motopark	Dallara F311-Volkswagen	FIA Formula 3 European Championship	Circuit Zandvoort	
2015	(Italy) Antonio Giovinazzi	(United Kingdom) Jagonya Ayam with Carlin	Dallara F315-Volkswagen	FIA Formula 3 European Championship	Circuit Zandvoort	
2016	(Sweden) Joel Eriksson	(Germany) Motopark	Dallara F316-Volkswagen	FIA Formula 3 European Championship	Circuit Zandvoort	
