= 2014 Zandvoort Masters =

Formula Three event

Race details
Date	6 July 2014
Official name	Masters of Formula 3
Location	Circuit Park Zandvoort, Netherlands
Course	4.307 km (2.676 mi)
Distance	25 laps, 107.675 km (66.906 mi)

Pole
Driver	(Netherlands) Max Verstappen	Motopark
Time	1:32.628

Fastest Lap
Driver	(Netherlands) Indy Dontje	Motopark
Time	1:34.228 (on lap 8 of 25)

Podium
First	(Netherlands) Max Verstappen	Motopark
Second	(Netherlands) Steijn Schothorst	Performance Racing
Third	(Malaysia) Nabil Jeffri	Motopark

The 2014 Zandvoort Masters was the 24th edition of the Masters of Formula 3 event, a non-championship race for cars that conform to Formula Three regulations. The event was held on 6 July 2014 at Circuit Park Zandvoort, in Zandvoort, North Holland; it was the 22nd time that the circuit held the event.

Motopark driver Max Verstappen – the son of 1993 winner and former Formula One driver, Jos Verstappen – started from pole position, and led every lap en route to becoming the youngest winner in the race's history, aged 16. Verstappen won by six seconds on the road from Jules Szymkowiak, his Van Amersfoort Racing teammate in the FIA European Formula 3 Championship. However, Szymkowiak was given a 20-second penalty post-race after a first-corner incident with Sam MacLeod, the team's German Formula Three Championship driver, which dropped him to fifth place. This promoted Performance Racing's Steijn Schothorst, on his Formula Three début, into second place, and Motopark's Nabil Jeffri into third place.

== Drivers and teams ==
Eleven drivers from seven countries contested the 2014 Zandvoort Masters; four drivers represented the German Formula Three Championship, with three each from the FIA European Formula 3 Championship and the British Formula 3 Championship. Steijn Schothorst completed the field, competing in his first Formula Three race with Performance Racing, stepping up from the Formula Renault Eurocup.

The Zandvoort Masters was first contested in 1991 as a one-off international meeting with drivers from all the major national Formula Three championships invited to compete. The race was considered a stepping stone to higher racing categories such as Formula One and it returned the Circuit Zandvoort to international recognition after the series stopped holding events at the track at the end of the 1985 season. It later took over from the Monaco Grand Prix Formula Three support race as the most prestigious meeting in European Formula Three. Circuit Zolder hosted the 2007 and 2008 editions due to noise restrictions imposed by the Supreme Court of the Netherlands in the Zandvoort area. The Masters of Formula 3 returned to Zandvoort in 2009 and it continued to hold it until its last iteration in 2016 due to calendar changes for the track and FIA Formula Three European Championship regulations probiting any racing activity prior the round in the same area.

Team	No	Driver	Chassis	Engine	Main series
(Germany) Motopark	1	(Netherlands) Max Verstappen	Dallara F311	Volkswagen	FIA European Formula 3 Championship
(Germany) Motopark	2	(Netherlands) Indy Dontje	Dallara F311	Volkswagen	German Formula Three Championship
(Germany) Motopark	3	(Malaysia) Nabil Jeffri	Dallara F311	Volkswagen	German Formula Three Championship
(Netherlands) Van Amersfoort Racing	5	(Netherlands) Jules Szymkowiak	Dallara F308	Volkswagen	FIA European Formula 3 Championship
(Netherlands) Van Amersfoort Racing	6	(United Kingdom) Sam MacLeod	Dallara F308	Volkswagen	German Formula Three Championship
(United Kingdom) Double R Racing	7	(Netherlands) Dennis van de Laar	Dallara F308	Mercedes	FIA European Formula 3 Championship
(United Kingdom) Double R Racing	8	(Macau) Andy Chang	Dallara F312	Mercedes	British Formula 3 Championship
(United Kingdom) Double R Racing	9	(United States) Camren Kaminsky	Dallara F312	Mercedes	British Formula 3 Championship
(United Kingdom) Fortec Motorsports	10	(China) Martin Cao	Dallara F312	Mercedes	British Formula 3 Championship
(Italy) ADM Motorsport	17	(Russia) Nikita Zlobin	Dallara F311	Volkswagen	German Formula Three Championship
(United Kingdom) Performance Racing	20	(Netherlands) Steijn Schothorst	Dallara F310	Volkswagen	Eurocup Formula Renault 2.0

== Classification ==
=== Qualifying ===
Two qualifying sessions were held for the event, with the driver's fastest lap from either session, counting towards their respective grid position.

Pos	No	Driver	Team	Q1	Q2
1	1	(Netherlands) Max Verstappen	Motopark	1:48.219	1:32.628
2	6	(United Kingdom) Sam MacLeod	Van Amersfoort Racing	1:49.329	1:33.248
3	3	(Malaysia) Nabil Jeffri	Motopark	1:49.627	1:33.412
4	20	(Netherlands) Steijn Schothorst	Performance Racing	1:50.636	1:33.481
5	5	(Netherlands) Jules Szymkowiak	Van Amersfoort Racing	1:47.495	1:33.553
6	2	(Netherlands) Indy Dontje	Motopark	1:48.607	1:33.691
7	8	(Macau) Andy Chang	Double R Racing	1:51.248	1:33.834
8	7	(Netherlands) Dennis van de Laar	Double R Racing	1:49.461	1:33.992
9	10	(China) Martin Cao	Fortec Motorsports	1:51.223	1:34.108
10	9	(United States) Camren Kaminsky	Double R Racing	1:50.379	1:34.831
11	17	(Russia) Nikita Zlobin	ADM Motorsport	4:48.374	1:34.909

=== Race ===
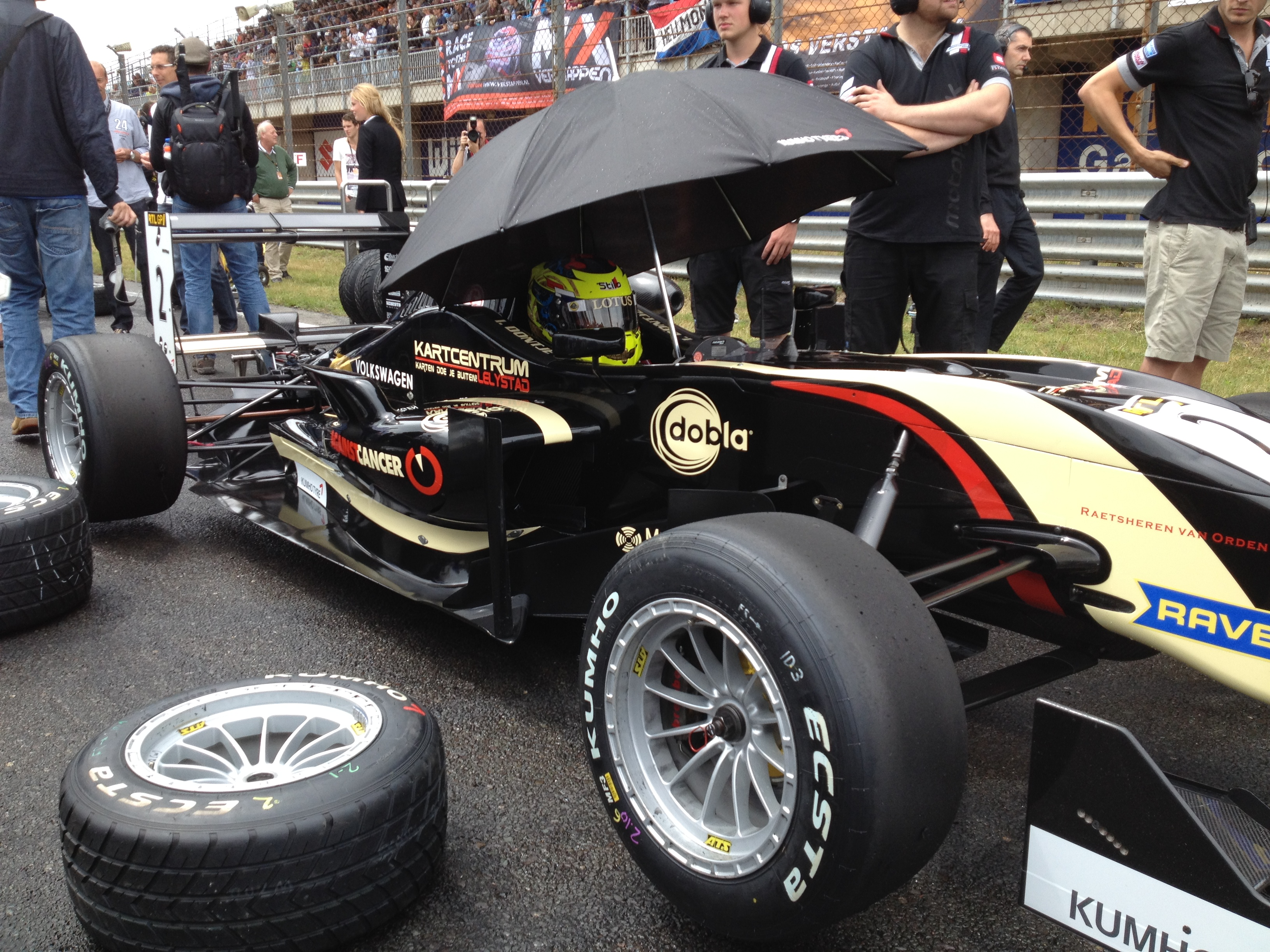
Indy Dontje on the 2014 Zandvoort Masters grid.

Pos	No	Driver	Team	Laps	Time/Retired	Grid
1	1	(Netherlands) Max Verstappen	Motopark	25	39:49.252	1
2	20	(Netherlands) Steijn Schothorst	Performance Racing	25	+9.779	4
3	4	(Malaysia) Nabil Jeffri	Motopark	25	+10.979	3
4	9	(Netherlands) Indy Dontje	Motopark	25	+11.666	6
5	6	(Netherlands) Jules Szymkowiak	Van Amersfoort Racing	25	+26.330	5
6	10	(China) Martin Cao	Fortec Motorsports	25	+28.602	9
7	17	(Russia) Nikita Zlobin	ADM Motorsport	25	+29.345	11
8	7	(Netherlands) Dennis van de Laar	Double R Racing	25	+29.488	8
9	9	(United States) Camren Kaminsky	Double R Racing	25	+32.521	10
10	8	(Macau) Andy Chang	Double R Racing	25	+35.030	7
Ret	5	(United Kingdom) Sam MacLeod	Van Amersfoort Racing	0	Retired	2
Fastest lap: Indy Dontje, 1:34.228, 164.549 km/h (102.246 mph) on lap 8
