= InMotion =

Netherlands-based university electric vehicle racing team

- Formation: 2012; 14 years ago
- Founder: Albert Maas, Maarten Steinbuch
- Founded at: Eindhoven
- Location: Helmond, Netherlands
- Electric Lap Record Circuit Zandvoort: 1:48:371 (Beitske Visser, 2017)
- Electric Lap Record Circuit Zolder: 1:42:641 (Xavier Maassen, 2017)
- Electric Lap Record TT Circuit Assen: 1:43:059 (Jeroen Mul, 2018)
- Website: www.inmotion.tue.nl

InMotion (also known as Automotive Technology InMotion) is a student team focused on electric racing and fast charging innovations. InMotion is based at the Automotive Campus in Helmond and is composed mostly of students from the Eindhoven University of Technology and Fontys University of Applied Sciences. Over the years, four different project race cars have been created. The Revolution, now recognized as the fastest-charging long-distance electric race car globally, was propelled to this status in July 2023 with the unveiling of the Next Generation Battery Pack by InMotion, enabling it to charge in just under 4 minutes.

== History ==
The team was founded in 2012 by Albert Maas under the guidance of Maarten Steinbuch. In 2017, the Fusion, the team's first car, was built. The Fusion is an electric formula car and holds the electric lap record in Circuit Zandvoort, Circuit Zolder and TT Circuit Assen. After the Fusion, the team developed an endurance race car, the Vision. InMotion is now working on the Revolution, which is a Ginetta G58 (also known as LMP3 style), containing their Electric Refueling technology. The ultimate dream is to compete in the 24 Hours of Le Mans, in the Garage 56 class, in order to test the car and battery pack in the toughest conditions. Currently, the team has around seventy students working on the current project car.

== Vehicles ==
=== Ignition ===
The Ignition model was the first project race car designed and was powered by bio-ethanol before the team moved into electrification with the next model.

=== Fusion ===
The InMotion team launched its first full electric racing car in 2016. The car was based on the former Formula Bio car has been built on a carbon fiber chassis. The full electric engine has a better power to weight ratio compared to a Formula E car. The car made its track debut at Circuit Zandvoort during the 2016 Masters of Formula 3 event. Drivers Xavier Maassen and Jan Lammers gave the car a shakedown. In 2017 USF2000 driver Rinus van Kalmthout did a straight line test at the Automotive Campus Helmond test track (part of the A270 motorway). During the year the team improved track records for electric cars at two tracks. Beitske Visser improved the record at Zandvoort. Testdriver Maassen beat the track record for electric cars at Circuit Zolder, previously held by Bert Longin in a Tesla Roadster. Currently, the Fusion is an electric formula car and holds the electric lap record in Circuit Zandvoort, Circuit Zolder and TT Circuit Assen.

=== Vision ===
In September 2018, the Vision was revealed to the world, unveiling the concept of the ultimate electric endurance racecar according to InMotion. This groundbreaking vehicle not only embodied their innovative design philosophy but also announced their new focus: fast charging. Termed 'Electric Refueling', this advancement addresses an issue hindering the widespread adoption of electric cars: long charging times. Their aim was to eliminate this barrier, making electric cars more enticing and accessible to the general public. In this car, mostly the aerodynamics was taken into account; it is almost 10 times as aerodynamically efficient as a current Formula 1 car.

=== Revolution ===
The Revolution is the current project race car designed to be ready to showcase the fast-charging technologies applied by the team to be ready for full electric endurance racing. The Revolution is a LMP3, with a Ginetta G58 chassis. The theoretical top speed is 316 kph and a power of 480 kW (640 pk). The car weighs about 1350 kg. During the assembly phase of the Revolution in November 2020, InMotion achieved another significant milestone: an exceptionally rapid fast-charging time. Within just 12 minutes, the race car's state of charge (SoC) increases from 20% to 80%. In July 2023, InMotion unveiled the Next Generation Battery Pack, facilitating the Revolution's ability to charge in a mere 4 minutes. Over the past 2.5 years, the team successfully reduced charging time by 66%, down from 12 minutes the previous year. As far as is known, this achievement positions the Revolution as the fastest-charging long-distance electric race car globally. The newest project of InMotion is the next iteration of the Next Generation Battery Pack (NGBP), the NGBP EVO. The goal of this project is to improve the robustness of the battery pack. Eventually increasing the pack’s potential for real-world cooling applications. In august 2026 InMotion tested the Revolution at Circuit Bilster Berg. Here it drove a fastest lap time of 1:46.5, which is almost as fast as a Porsche 911 gt3rs MR.

https://innovationorigins.com/en/tu-e-students-unveil-worlds-fastest-charging-electric-race-car-for-long-distance-races/

== Gallery ==
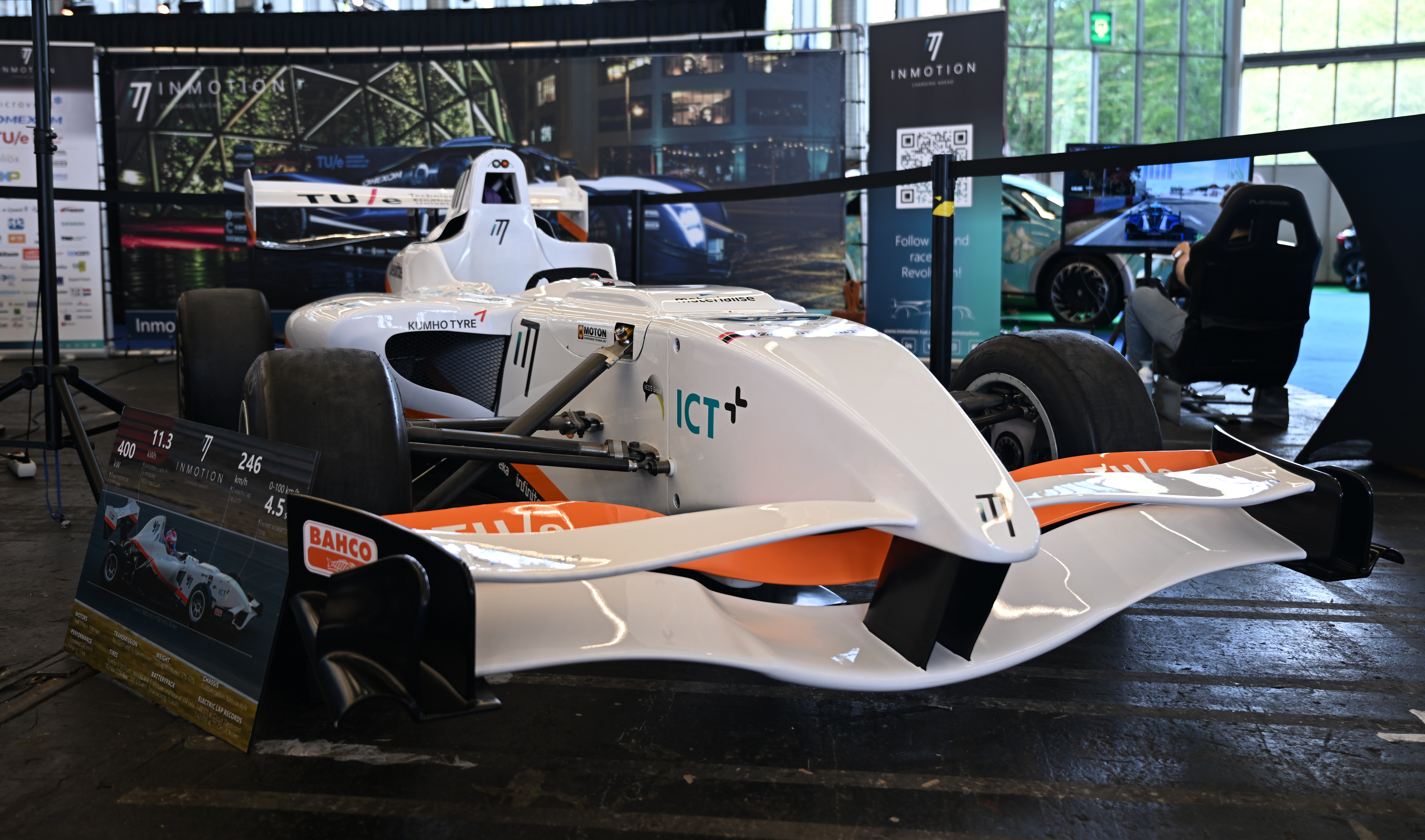
The Fusion on display.

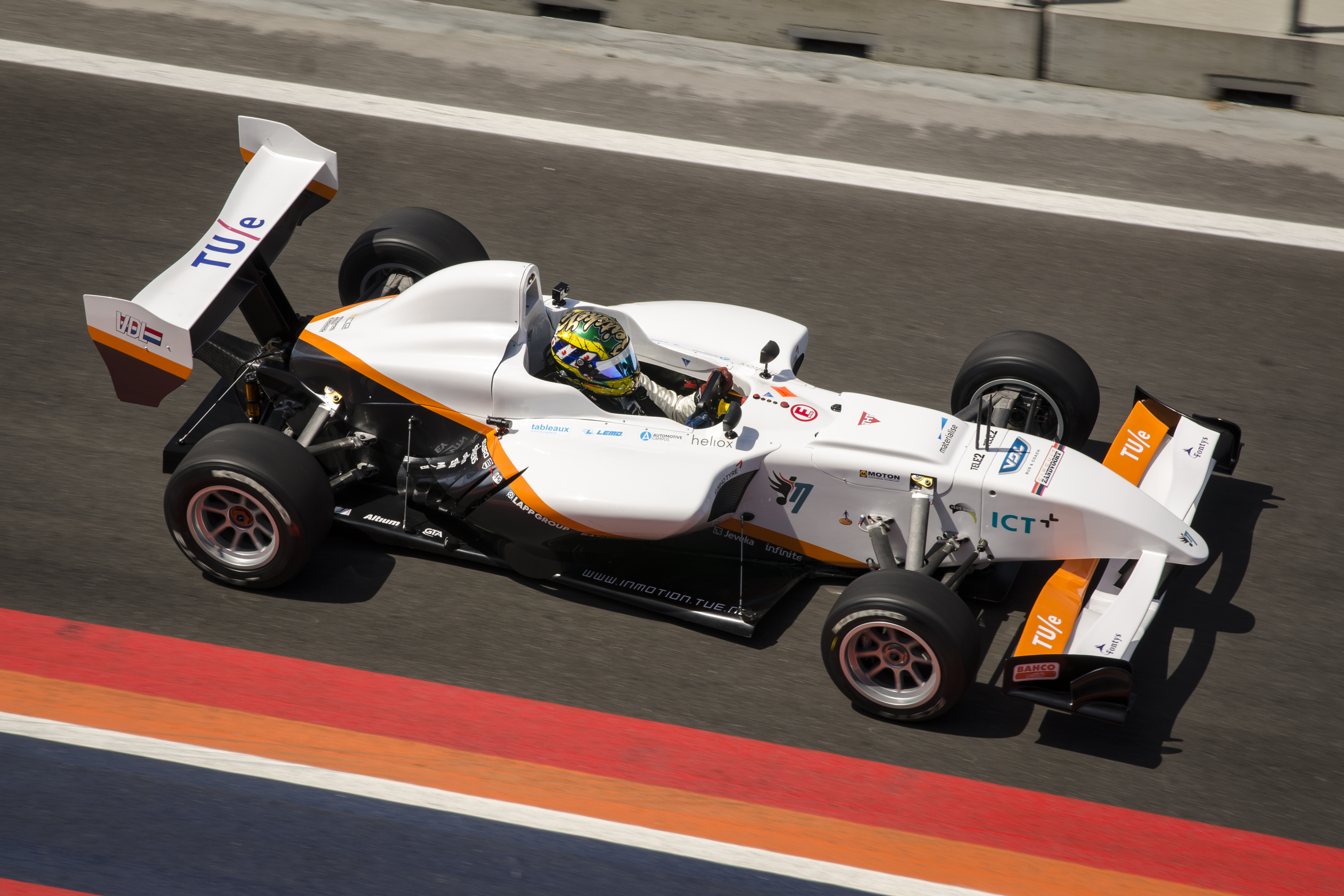
The Fusion on the track with Beitske Visser behind the wheel.

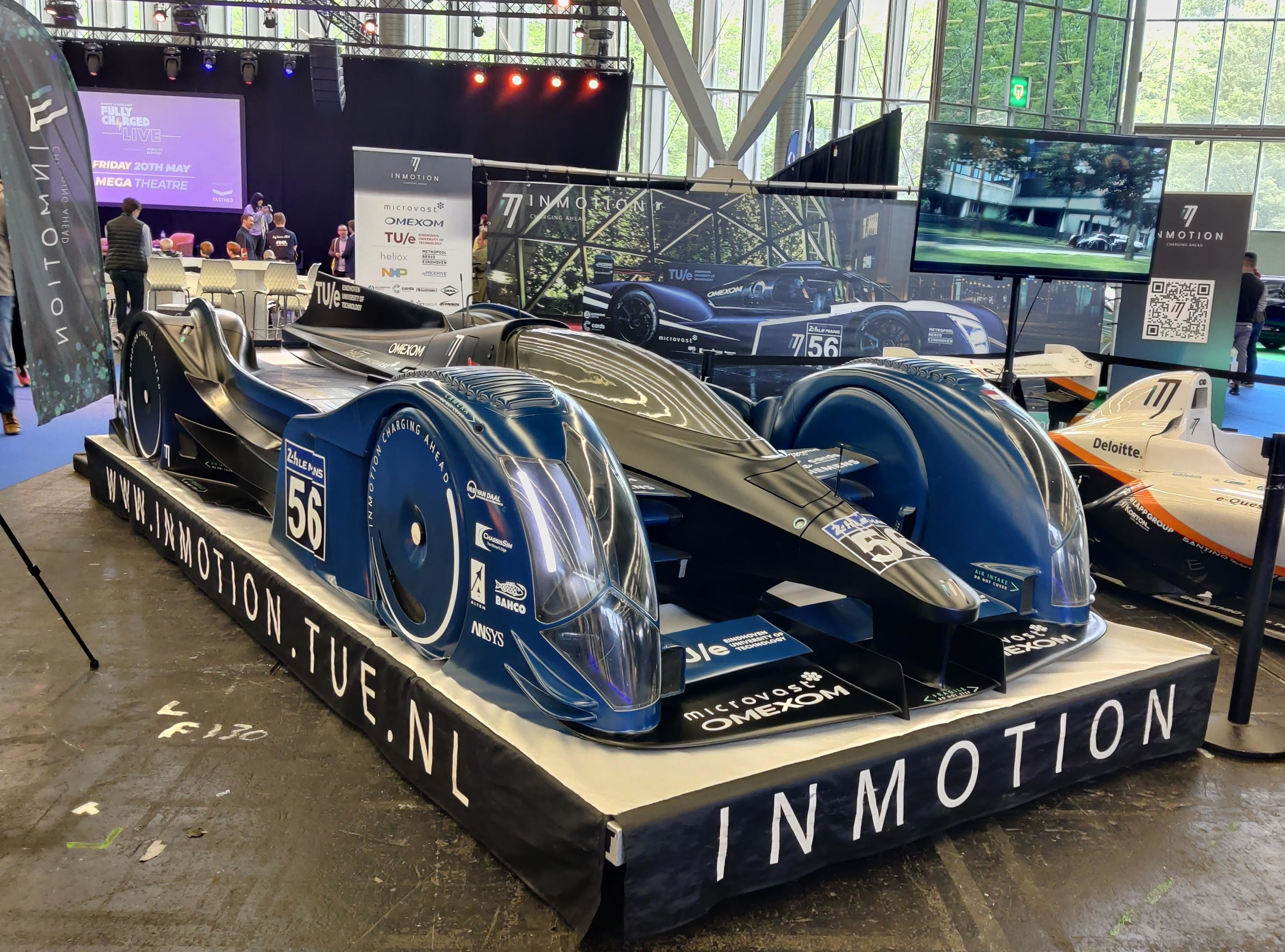
The Vision from Eindhoven University of Technology.

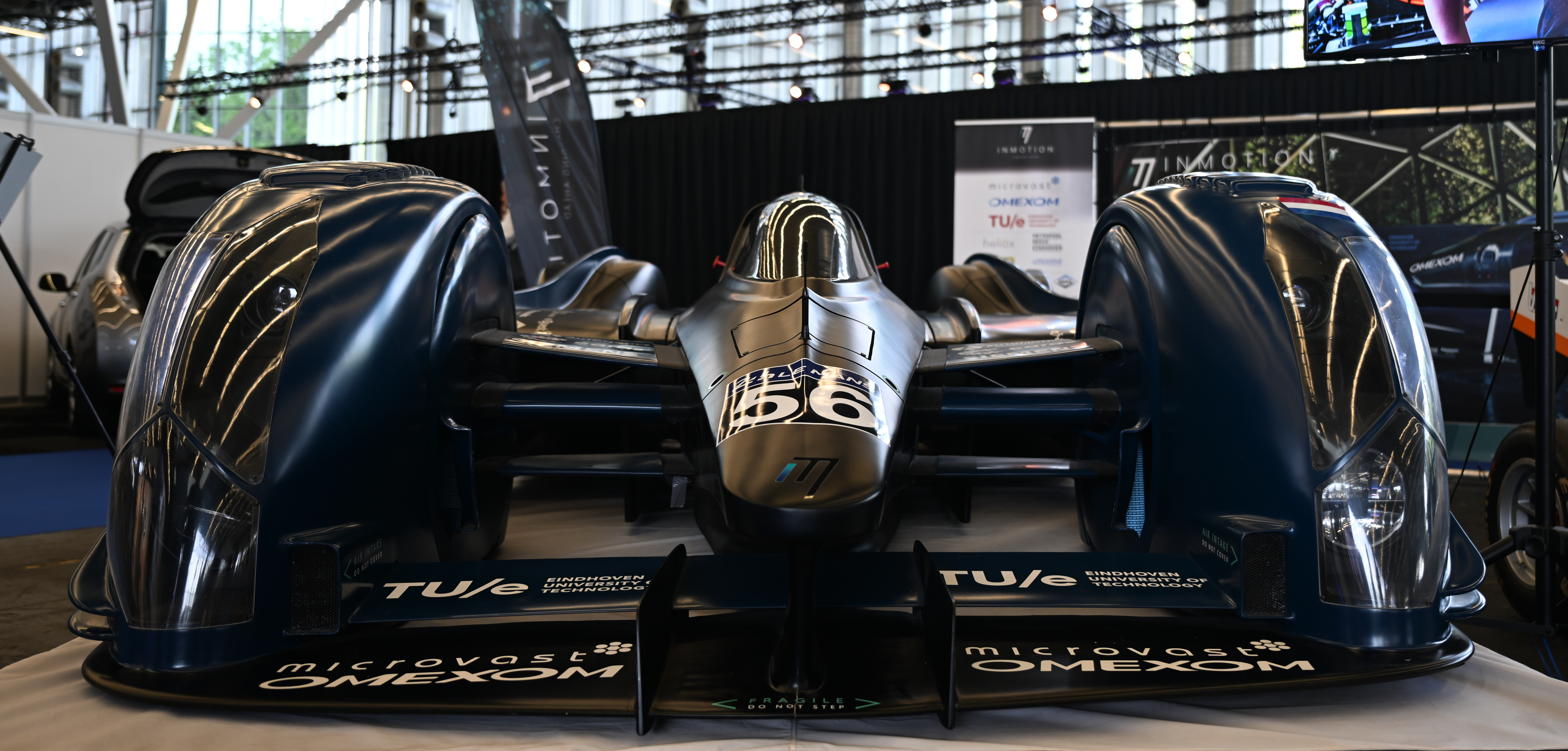
Front view of the Vision.

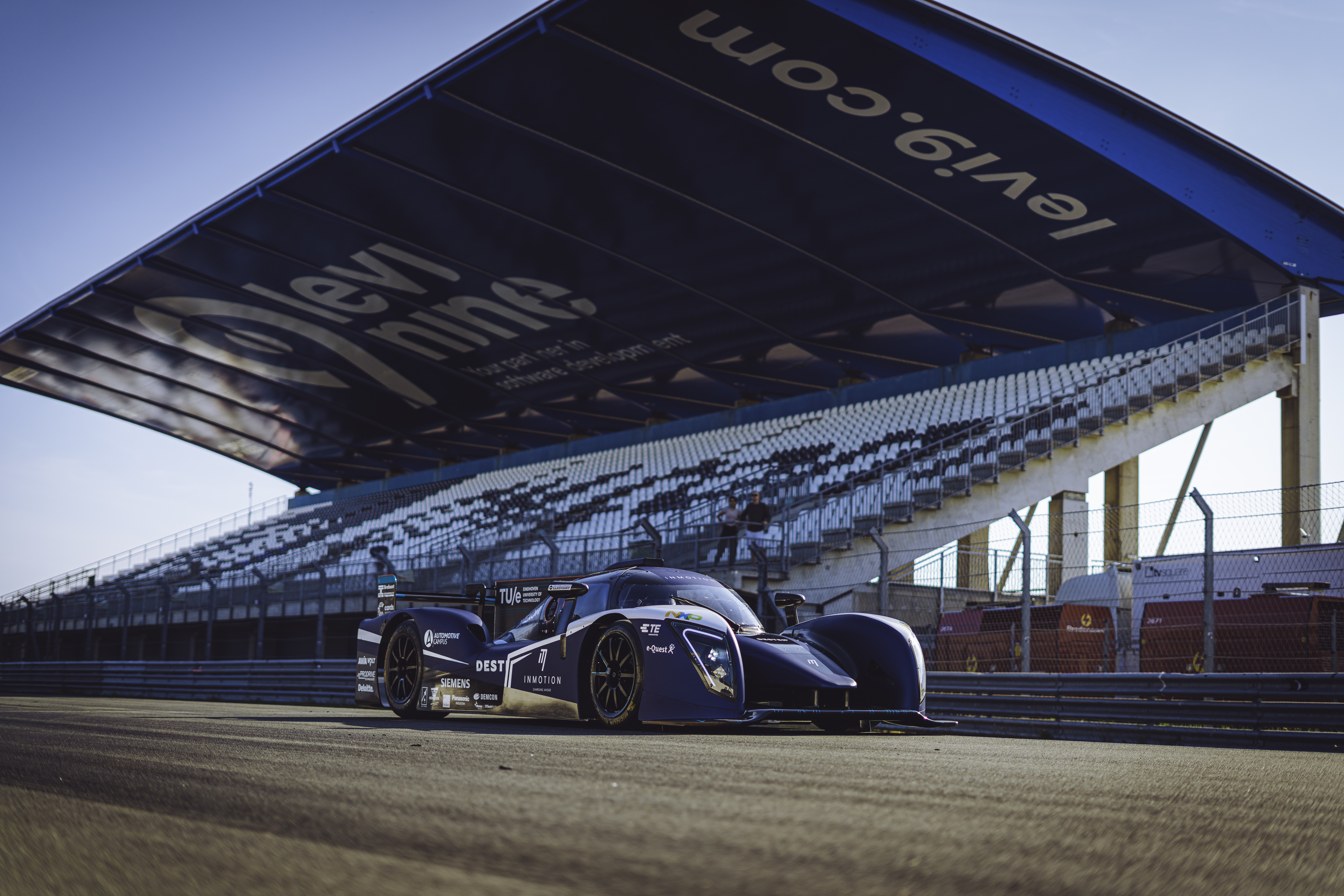
Shots of the Revolution at the Zandvoort Circuit.

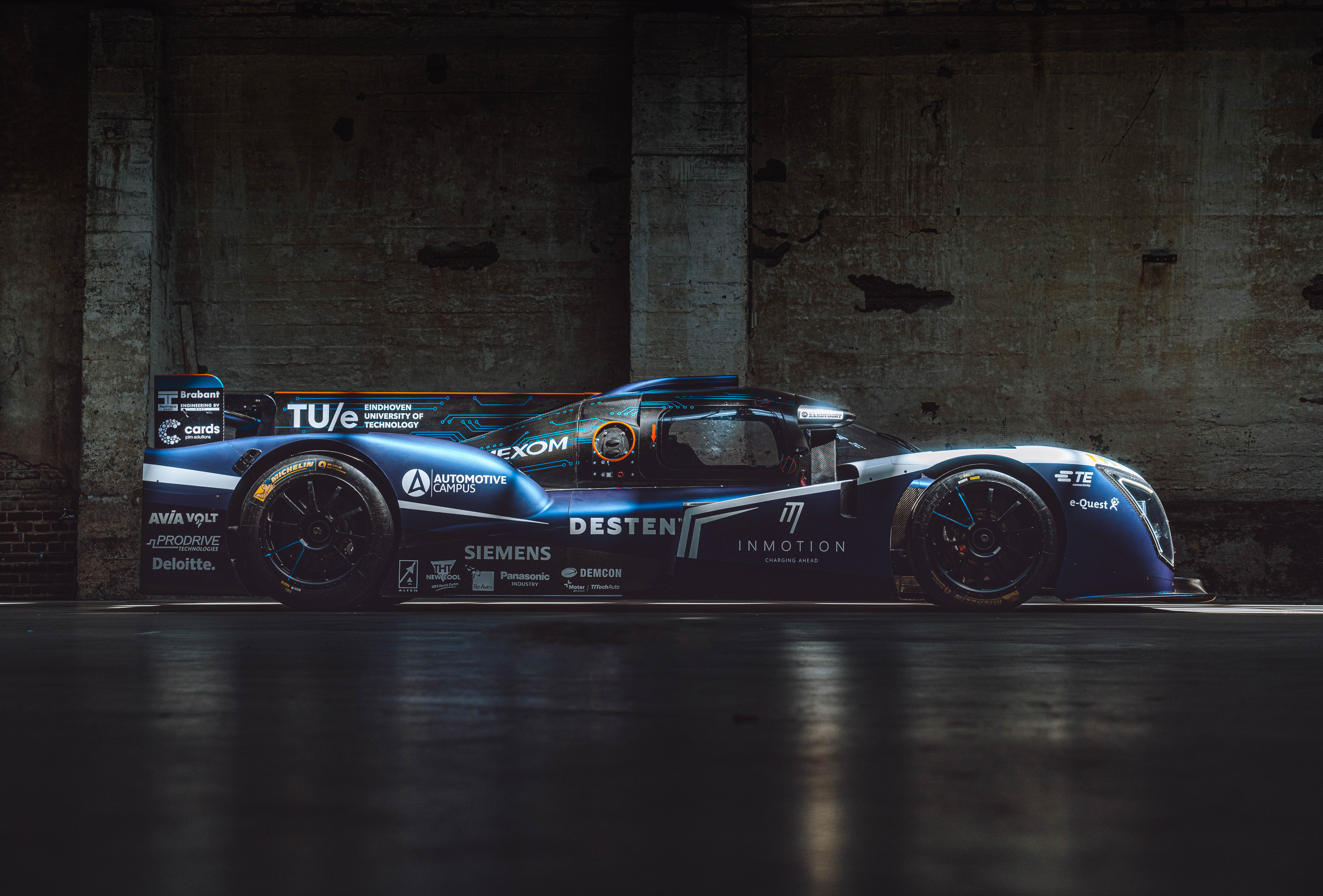
Picture of the side of the Revolution.

The Revolution driving at Bilster Berg.
