= Claire Dubbelman =

Dutch motorsport official (born 1985 or 1986)

- Born: 1986; Netherlands
- Occupation: Motorsport official
- Known for: Permanent deputy FIA race director for Formula One

Claire Dubbelman (born 1986) is a Dutch motorsport official who previously served as the deputy race director for Formula One.

== Early life ==
Dubbelman's father, Huub, worked as a journalist and in public relations for Mercedes-Benz in the Netherlands. As a result of this, Dubbelman was exposed to motorsport during her childhood. At the age of 21, she earned a bachelor's degree in international communication.

== Career ==
Dubbelman's motorsport career began as an organizer for the Formula Renault Northern European Cup (NEC), during which she was responsible for various tasks relating to keeping the series up and running. She later moved into a managerial role for the FIA Formula 3 European Championship. She became a full-time employee of the Fédération Internationale de l'Automobile in 2017, and she was responsible for managing a total of 26 championships in 2021—including FIA Formula 2 and FIA Formula 3.

Her first experience in Formula One race control came during the second half of 2022, and her first full season of working in race control was during the 2023 season. For the 2024 season, she was promoted to deputy race director and was given a role within Formula One's sporting department. Dubbelman was also granted an FIA race director super licence, which allows individuals to serve as a race director for Formula One races. She is the first woman to be granted the licence, and at the time was the youngest person to be granted the licence (at 38 years old). She continues in her role for 2025 on a permanent basis, alongside race director Rui Marques. She departed from the FIA at the end of the 2025 season, moving to work in motorsport in Saudi Arabia.
