= Joel Eriksson (racing driver) =

Swedish racing driver (born 1998)

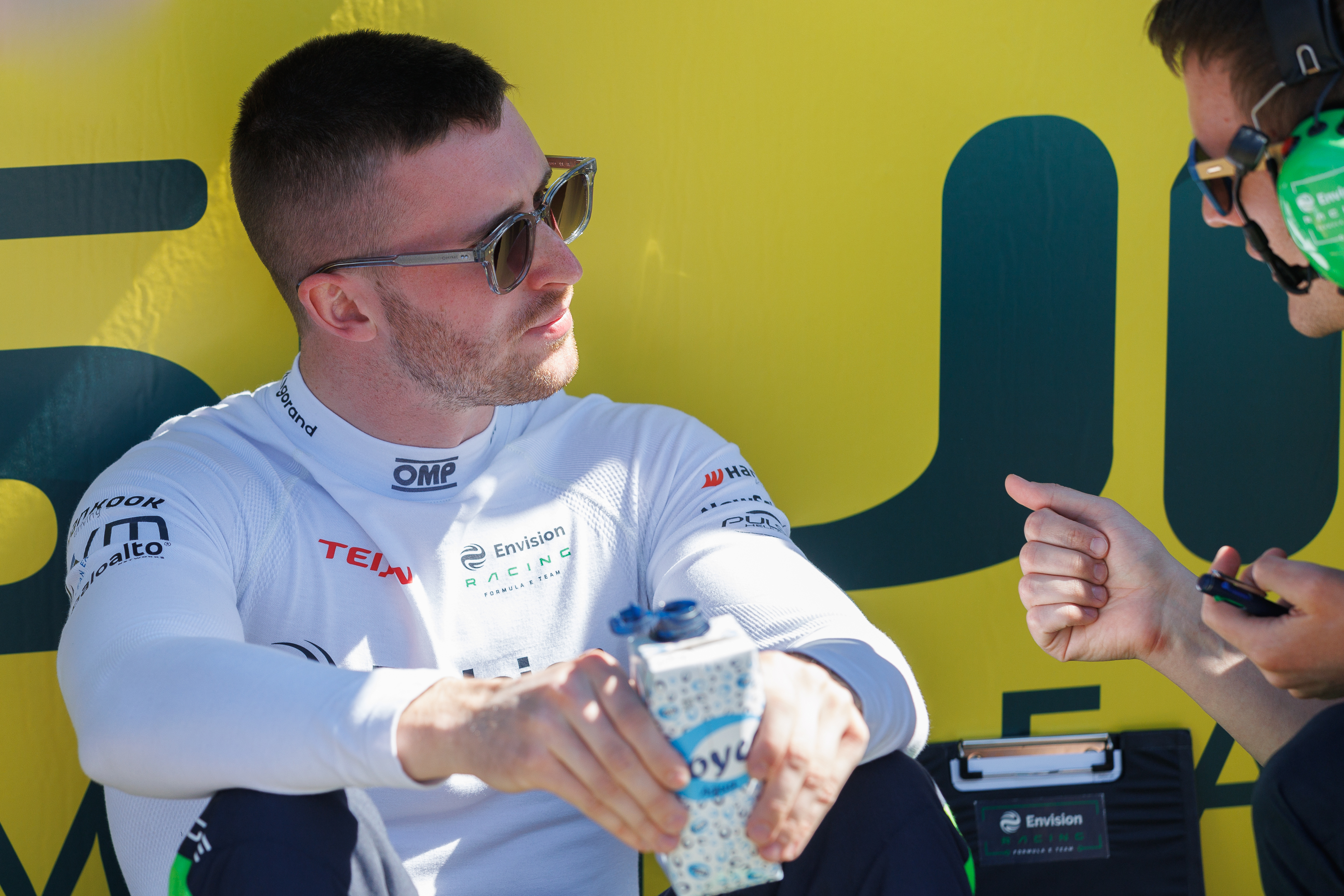
- Eriksson at the 2024 Berlin ePrix
- Nationality: (Sweden) Swedish
- Born: Joel Daniel Andreas Eriksson; 28 June 1998 (age 28) Tomelilla, Sweden
- Relatives: Jimmy Eriksson (brother)

Formula E career
- Debut season: 2020–21
- Categorisation: FIA Platinum
- Car number: 4
- Former teams: Dragon / Penske Autosport, Envision Racing
- Starts: 23
- Championships: 0
- Wins: 0
- Podiums: 1
- Poles: 0
- Fastest laps: 0
- Best finish: 24th in 2023–24
- Finished last season: 24th (2 pts)

Previous series
- 2015 2015 2014: ADAC Formula 4 SMP F4 Championship; ADAC Formel Masters

Joel Daniel Andreas Eriksson (born 28 June 1998) is a Swedish racing driver who last competed in Formula E for Envision Racing. He is a four-time race winner in the Nürburgring Langstrecken-Serie, won a race in the 2018 Deutsche Tourenwagen Masters, and finished runner-up to Lando Norris in the 2017 FIA Formula 3 European Championship.

== Early career ==
=== Karting ===
Eriksson began his karting career in 2007. He remained in karting until 2014.

=== Formula 4 (2014–2015) ===
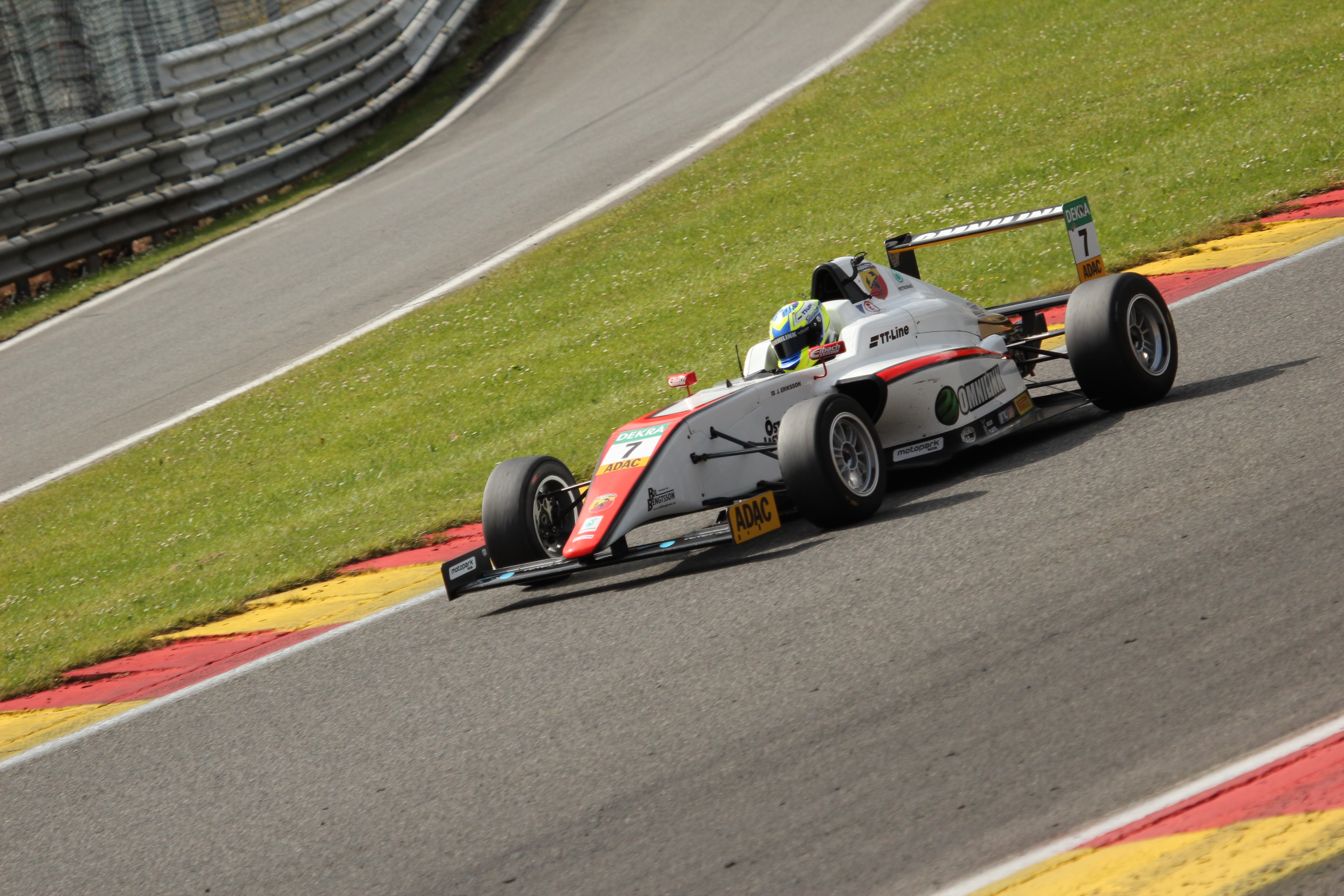
Eriksson at Spa-Francorchamps during the 2015 ADAC F4 season.

In 2014, Eriksson made his debut in open-wheel racing in the ADAC Formel Masters, driving for Motopark-run Lotus. He claimed one victory and finished fifth overall. Eriksson remained with Motopark in the now-renamed series in 2015, finishing second in the standings after winning seven races.

=== F3 European Championship (2016–2018) ===
In 2016, Eriksson moved to the FIA Formula 3 European Championship with Motopark. He won one race at Spa-Francorchamps and was fifth in the championship standings. He continued with the team into the 2017 season, where he was runner-up to Carlin's Lando Norris with seven wins.

Eriksson took part in the 2018 Macau Grand Prix with Motopark Academy. Despite collecting a crashed Ukyo Sasahara in qualifying, Eriksson qualified in fourth place. He took second in the qualification race after passing Sacha Fenestraz and Callum Ilott, before finishing second in the main race behind teammate Dan Ticktum.

== Sportscar career ==
=== DTM (2018–2019) ===
Eriksson joined BMW Team RBM in 2018 to drive in the Deutsche Tourenwagen Masters. During his debut season, Eriksson achieved his maiden DTM victory in a rain-drenched night race at Misano, making him the second-youngest DTM race winner in the process. He ended up 14th in the drivers' standings.

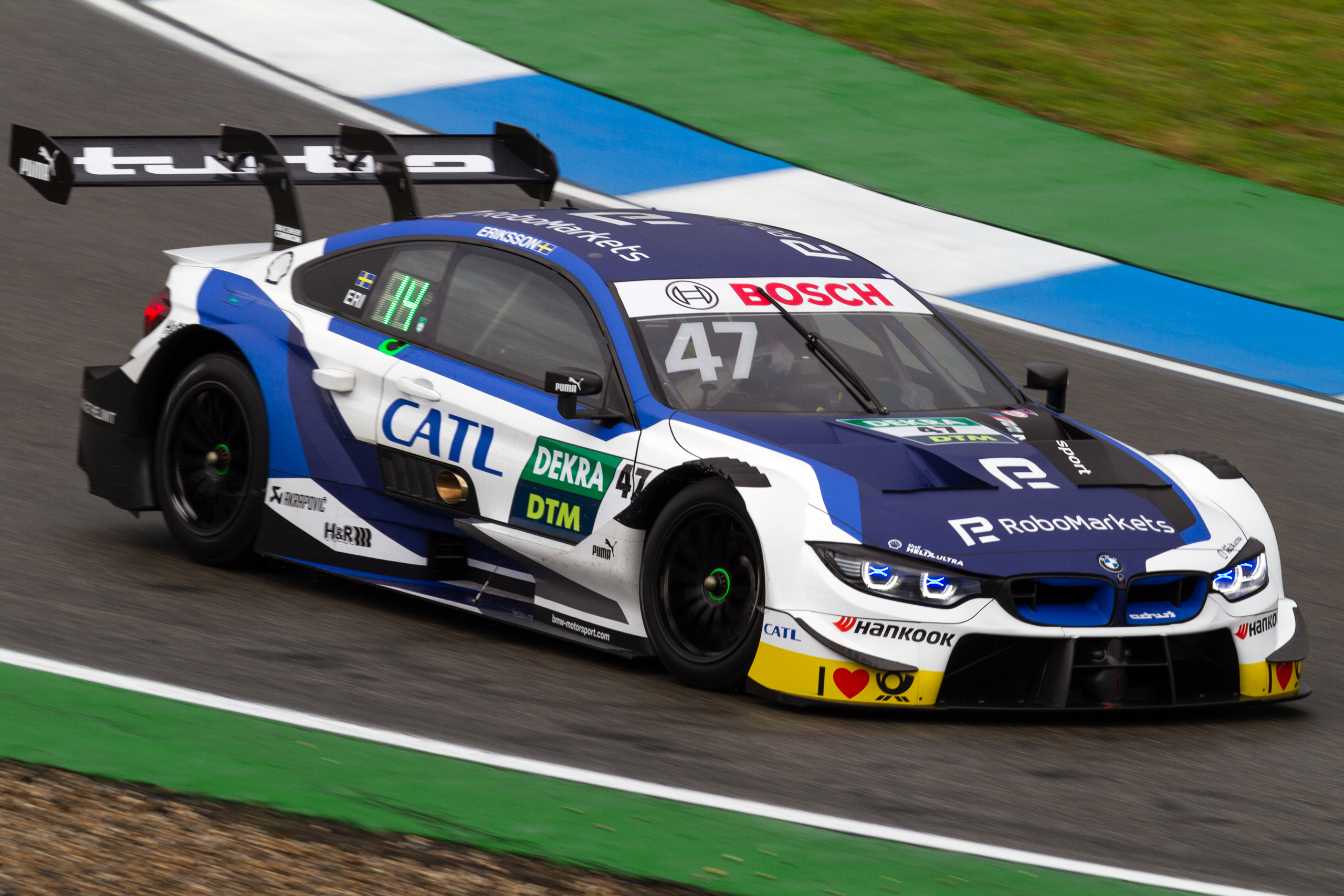
Eriksson's BMW M4 Turbo DTM at Hockenheim in 2019.

For the 2019 DTM season, Eriksson remained at Team RBM. At round 2 in Zolder, Eriksson held off Nico Müller to finish second in race 1. He scored another podium at the Norisring, claiming third place in race 1. After finishing 11th in the standings, Eriksson was excluded from BMW's DTM driver roster for the 2020 season.

=== ADAC GT Masters (2020–2021) ===
Despite being overlooked for a place in the DTM, Eriksson remained with BMW in 2020, racing in the ADAC GT Masters with Schubert Motorsport and sharing his car with Aidan Read. The pair only scored points on three occasions during the season, resulting in 37th place in the drivers' standings.

After missing the opening three rounds of the 2021 season, Eriksson joined Porsche-fielding KÜS Team Bernhard. At the Nürburgring season finale, Eriksson and teammate Marco Holzer finished second during race 2.

=== British GT (2022) ===
During 2022, Eriksson drove for Century Motorsport in three races of the British GT Championship.

=== Nürburgring Langstrecken-Serie (2022–2024) ===
Having attained his Nordschleife Grade A permit during his time with BMW, Eriksson joined Falken Motorsports for the 6 Hours of the Nürburgring as part of the 2022 Nürburgring Langstrecken-Serie. Partnering Sven Müller, Eriksson took the lead from Patrick Assenheimer with two hours to go and extended his lead, thus taking a dominant victory in his first GT3 race at the Nordschleife. He then joined Müller, Alessio Picariello, and Jaxon Evans for the subsequent 12-hour race in Falken's No. 3 car. After running a clean race, the No. 3 claimed the win.

Eriksson reunited with Falken for the 2023 NLS campaign, partnering Müller for the NLS1 season opener. The duo finished 12th. Eriksson then ended NLS2 in ninth alongside Tim Heinemann while setting the fastest lap, before contesting the 24 Hours of Nürburgring alongside Heinemann, Nico Menzel, and Martin Ragginger in the No. 44 Falken. They ended the race tenth overall, two laps behind the leading car. At NLS5, Eriksson partnered David Pittard and claimed a dominant victory, setting the fastest lap in the process.

In 2024, Eriksson remained with Falken in the NLS. He and Nico Menzel won NLS1, with Eriksson pulling off the race-winning overtake on Porsche factory driver Laurens Vanthoor in the second half of the race. During NLS2 the following day, Eriksson and Tim Heinemann finished third. At that year's 24 Hours of Nürburgring, Falken once again fielded Eriksson, Heinemann, Menzel, and Ragginger in its No. 44 entry. The race was ended prematurely, resulting in the lineup's second successive tenth-placed finish. Eriksson ended his time at Falken Motorsports with an 11th place at the penultimate NLS race of 2024.

== Formula E ==
Eriksson tested Formula E machinery for the first time in January 2018, driving for DS Virgin Racing in the 2018 rookie test at Marrakesh.

=== Dragon Racing (2021) ===
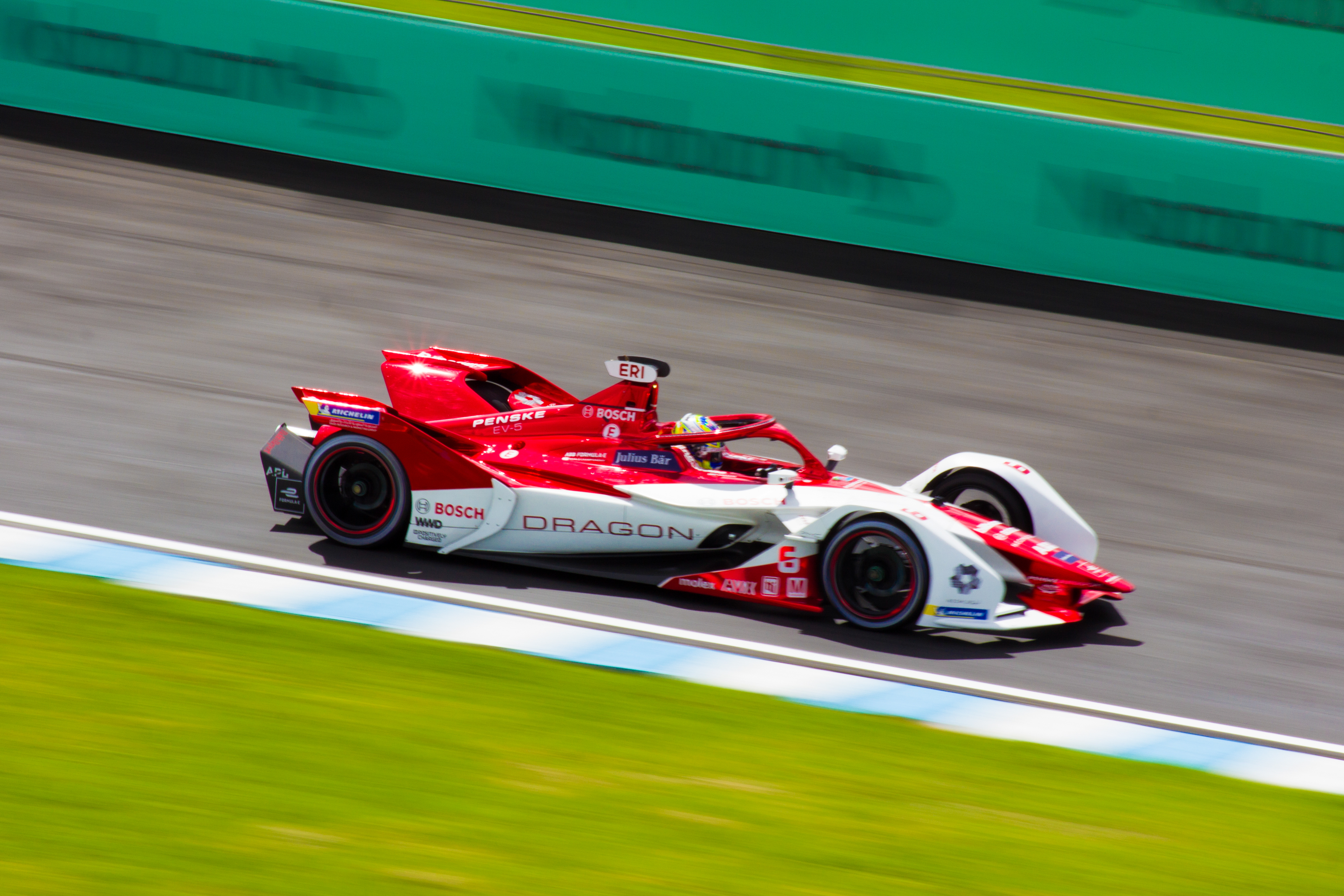
Eriksson made his Formula E debut with Dragon at the 2021 Puebla ePrix.

Eriksson was named by Dragon Racing as its official test and reserve driver for the 2019–20 season, taking part in the March 2020 rookie test at Marrakesh. He retained the role the following year as the team rebranded as Dragon / Penske Autosport. He made his debut in the championship at the 2021 Puebla ePrix, replacing regular driver Nico Müller, who left the team due to several clashing commitments. He finished the 2021 season with one point in eight races.

=== Envision Racing (2024–2026) ===
==== 2023–24 season ====
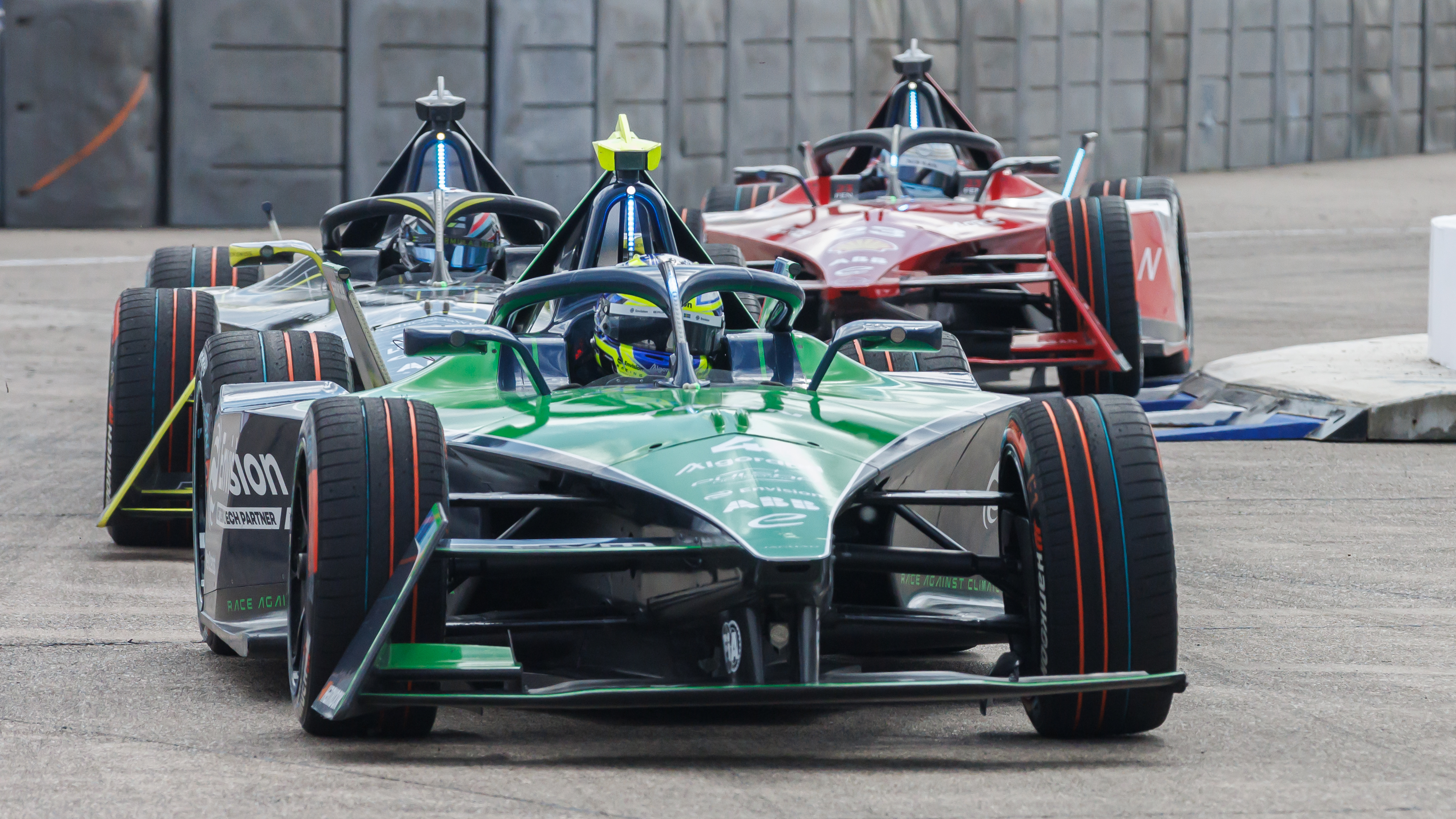
Eriksson leading the DS Penske of Jean-Éric Vergne and the Nissan of Sacha Fenestraz at the 2024 Berlin ePrix.

Eriksson made his first start since the 2021 Berlin ePrix for Envision Racing at the 2024 Berlin ePrix, subbing in for Robin Frijns who had commitments in the World Endurance Championship. Having retired from race 1 following a collision, Eriksson scored points in race 2 by finishing ninth, thus ending the team's four-race points drought.

==== 2025–26 season ====
Eriksson was promoted to a full-time race seat for the 2025–26 season with Envision Racing, replacing Robin Frijns and partnering Sébastien Buemi. At the season-opening São Paulo ePrix, Eriksson qualified eighteenth, but moved up the order late in the race to finish seventh and in the points. Round three in Miami proved to be successful for the Swede, qualifying sixth in his maiden duel-stage qualifying appearance in the championship. Following the start, Eriksson moved up to fourth in the initial stages of the race, before being overtaken by Félix da Costa and Pascal Wehrlein, and fell further down to seventh following an overtake from Mitch Evans. A crash between Felipe Drugovich and Félix da Costa promoted Eriksson up to fifth place. In the final laps of the race, he overtook Nyck de Vries for fourth, where Eriksson remained until the finish, securing his best finish in the championship to date. At Madrid, Eriksson returned to a points paying position, finishing in tenth. He made a second appearance in the qualifying duels during qualifying two at Berlin, rounding off the session in fourth. This was Eriksson's best qualifying to date. During the initial stages of the race, Eriksson and teammate Buemi ran up at the front. However, a lack of available energy in the latter stages meant that Eriksson had to wind down his pace, having to cede positions to his competitors. He ultimately finished tenth. At Monaco, Eriksson qualified in seventh for race one, and finished the race in sixth. He had more difficulty in qualifying two, ending the session sixteenth. A well-executed race propelled Eriksson up into the points, finishing the race in seventh.

Prior to the season-ending London ePrix, Eriksson and Buemi were announced to be leaving the team following the conclusion of the season.

== Personal life ==
Eriksson is the younger brother of racing driver Jimmy Eriksson.

== Racing record ==
=== Career summary ===
Season	Series	Team	Races	Wins	Poles	F/Laps	Podiums	Points	Position
2014	ADAC Formel Masters	Lotus	24	1	0	0	6	188	5th
2015	ADAC Formula 4 Championship	Motopark	23	7	3	1	10	299	**2nd**
2015	SMP F4 Championship	Koiranen GP	3	0	0	0	1	30	12th
2016	FIA Formula 3 European Championship	Motopark	30	1	1	2	10	252	5th
2016	Masters of Formula 3	Motopark	1	1	1	0	1	N/A	**1st**
2016	Macau Grand Prix	Motopark	1	0	0	0	0	N/A	DNF
2017	FIA Formula 3 European Championship	Motopark	30	7	5	4	14	388	**2nd**
2017	Macau Grand Prix	Motopark	1	0	0	0	0	N/A	DNF
2018	Deutsche Tourenwagen Masters	BMW Team RBM	20	1	0	0	1	72	14th
2018	International GT Open	Senkyr Motorsport	2	0	0	0	1	20	21st
2018	Macau Grand Prix	Motopark	1	0	0	0	1	N/A	**2nd**
2019	Deutsche Tourenwagen Masters	BMW Team RBM	17	0	0	0	2	61	11th
2019	FIA GT World Cup	FIST-Team AAI	1	0	0	0	0	N/A	7th
2019–20	Asian Le Mans Series - GT	FIST-Team AAI	1	0	0	0	0	0	18th
2019–20	Formula E	GEOX Dragon	Test/Reserve driver						
2020	ADAC GT Masters	Schubert Motorsport	13	0	0	0	0	8	37th
2020–21	Formula E	Dragon / Penske Autosport	8	0	0	0	0	1	25th
2021	ADAC GT Masters	KÜS Team Bernhard	8	0	0	0	1	57	17th
2022	British GT Championship - GT3	Century Motorsport	3	0	0	0	0	0	33rd
2022	24H GT Series - GT3	Leipert Motorsport	1	0	0	0	0	0	NC†
2022	Nürburgring Langstrecken-Serie - SP9	Falken Motorsports	2	2	0	0	2	0	NC†
2022–23	Formula E	Jaguar TCS Racing	Reserve driver						
2023	Nürburgring Langstrecken-Serie - SP9	Falken Motorsports	3	1	0	2	1	0	NC
2023	24 Hours of Nürburgring - SP9	Falken Motorsports	1	0	0	0	0	0	10th
2023–24	Formula E	Envision Racing	2	0	0	0	0	2	24th
2023–24	Formula E	Jaguar TCS Racing	Reserve driver						
2024	Nürburgring Langstrecken-Serie - SP9	Falken Motorsports	3	1	0	0	2	0	NC†
2024	24 Hours of Nürburgring - SP9	Falken Motorsports	1	0	0	0	0	N/A	10th
2024	Intercontinental GT Challenge	Phantom Global Racing	2	0	0	1	1	21	12th
2024	Intercontinental GT Challenge	Falken Motorsports	1	0	0	0	0	21	12th
2024	GT World Challenge Asia	Phantom Global Racing	2	0	0	?	0	24	24th
2024	GT World Challenge Asia	AAS Phantom Global Racing	8	0	0	?	0	24	24th
2024	GT World Challenge Europe Endurance Cup	Phantom Global Racing	1	0	0	0	0	4	27th
2024–25	Formula E	Jaguar TCS Racing	Reserve driver						
2025	GT World Challenge Asia	Audi Sport Asia Team Phantom	2	0	0	0	1	19	31st
2025	FIA GT World Cup	Audi Sport Asia Team Phantom	1	0	0	0	0	N/A	5th
2025–26	Formula E	Envision Racing	17	0	0	0	1	55	16th
2026	FIA GT World Cup	Audi Sport Asia Team Phantom							

^{*} Season still in progress.

=== Complete ADAC Formel Masters/Formula 4 Championship results ===
(key) (Races in bold indicate pole position) (Races in italics indicate fastest lap)

Year	Team	1	2	3	4	5	6	7	8	9	10	11	12	13	14	15	16	17	18	19	20	21	22	23	24	DC	Points
2014	Lotus	OSC; 1; 6	OSC; 2; 9	OSC; 3; 10	ZAN; 1 Ret	ZAN; 2; 13	ZAN; 3; 6	LAU; 1; 7	LAU; 2; 6	LAU; 3; 7	RBR; 1; 3	RBR; 2; 7	RBR; 3; 1	SVK; 1; 8	SVK; 2; 6	SVK; 3; 2	NÜR; 1; 3	NÜR; 2; 4	NÜR; 3; 6	SAC; 1; 2	SAC; 2; 4	SAC; 3; 10	HOC; 1; 4	HOC; 2; 3	HOC; 3; 5	5th	188
2015	Motopark	OSC1; 1; 4	OSC1; 2; 9	OSC1; 3; 5	**RBR**; **1**; 1	RBR; 2; 1	RBR; 3 Ret	**SPA**; **1**; 1	**SPA**; **2**; 1	SPA; 3; 4	LAU; 1 EX	LAU; 2; 1	LAU; 3; 9	NÜR; 1; 4	NÜR; 2; 10	NÜR; 3; 6	SAC; 1; 2	SAC; 2; 2	SAC; 3; 6	OSC2; 1; 1	OSC2; 2; 1	OSC2; 3; 9	HOC; 1; 17	HOC; 2; 8	HOC; 3; 3	2nd	299

=== Complete SMP F4 Championship results ===
(key) (Races in bold indicate pole position) (Races in italics indicate fastest lap)

Year	1	2	3	4	5	6	7	8	9	10	11	12	13	14	15	16	17	18	19	20	21	DC	Points
2015	AHV; 1; 12	AHV; 2; 4	AHV; 3; 3	MSC1; 1	MSC1; 2	MSC1; 3	SOC; 1	SOC; 2	SOC; 3	ALA; 1	ALA; 2	ALA; 3	AUD1; 1	AUD1; 2	AUD1; 3	MSC2; 1	MSC2; 2	MSC2; 3	AUD2; 1	AUD2; 2	AUD2; 3	12th	30

=== Complete FIA Formula 3 European Championship results ===
(key) (Races in bold indicate pole position) (Races in italics indicate fastest lap)

Year	Entrant	Engine	1	2	3	4	5	6	7	8	9	10	11	12	13	14	15	16	17	18	19	20	21	22	23	24	25	26	27	28	29	30	DC	Points
2016	Motopark	Volkswagen	LEC; 1; 6	LEC; 2; 9	LEC; 3; 3	HUN; 1; 3	HUN; 2 Ret	HUN; 3; 2	PAU; 1; 14	PAU; 2; 9	PAU; 3; 6	RBR; 1; 17	RBR; 2; 14	RBR; 3; 6	NOR; 1 Ret	NOR; 2; 5	NOR; 3 Ret	ZAN; 1; 12	ZAN; 2; 10	ZAN; 3; 7	SPA; 1; 14	SPA; 2; 2	SPA; 3; 1	NÜR; 1; 7	NÜR; 2; 3	NÜR; 3; 6	IMO; 1; 3	IMO; 2; 2	IMO; 3; 5	HOC; 1; 6	HOC; 2; 2	**HOC**; **3**; 2	5th	252
2017	Motopark	Volkswagen	SIL; 1; 4	SIL; 2; 1	SIL; 3; 2	MNZ; 1; 4	**MNZ**; **2**; 1	**MNZ**; **3**; 4	PAU; 1; 1	PAU; 2 Ret	PAU; 3; 5	HUN; 1; 10	HUN; 2; 2	**HUN**; **3**; 1	NOR; 1; 4	NOR; 2; 10	NOR; 3; 7	SPA; 1; 9	SPA; 2; 2	SPA; 3; 2	ZAN; 1; 2	ZAN; 2; 12	ZAN; 3; 12	NÜR; 1; 10	NÜR; 2; 9	NÜR; 3; 8	RBR; 1; 2	**RBR**; **2**; 1	**RBR**; **3**; 1	HOC; 1; 1	HOC; 2; 4	HOC; 3; 2	2nd	388

=== Complete Masters of Formula 3 results ===
Year	Team	Car	Qualifying	Quali Race	Main race
2016	(Germany) Motopark	Dallara F312	**2nd**	**1st**	**1st**

=== Complete Macau Grand Prix results ===
Year	Team	Car	Qualifying	Quali Race	Main race
2016	(Germany) Motopark	Dallara F312	19th	15th	DNF
2017	(Germany) Motopark	Dallara F317	**1st**	**2nd**	DNF
2018	(Germany) Motopark	Dallara F317	4th	**2nd**	**2nd**

=== Complete Deutsche Tourenwagen Masters results ===
(key) (Races in bold indicate pole position) (Races in italics indicate fastest lap)

Year	Team	Car	1	2	3	4	5	6	7	8	9	10	11	12	13	14	15	16	17	18	19	20	Pos	Points
2018	BMW Team RBM	BMW M4 DTM	HOC; 1; 12	HOC; 2; 4	LAU; 1; 12	LAU; 2; 9	HUN; 1; 17	HUN; 2; 6	NOR; 1; 9	NOR; 2; 12	ZAN; 1; 9	ZAN; 2; 11	BRH; 1; 14	BRH; 2; 13	MIS; 1; 12	MIS; 2; 1	NÜR; 1; 12	NÜR; 2; 6	SPL; 1; 15	SPL; 2; 5	HOC; 1; 15	HOC; 2; 9	14th	72
2019	BMW Team RBM	BMW M4 Turbo DTM	HOC; 1; 13	HOC; 2; 10	ZOL; 1; 2	ZOL; 2; 10	MIS; 1 Ret	MIS; 2; 6	NOR; 1; 3	NOR; 2; 13	ASS; 1; 16	ASS; 2; 16†	BRH; 1 DNS	BRH; 2 Ret	LAU; 1; 8	LAU; 2; 13	NÜR; 1; 8	NÜR; 2; 11	HOC; 1; 10	HOC; 2; 6			11th	61

^{†} Driver retired, but was classified as they completed 75% of the winner's race distance.

=== Complete Nürburgring Langstrecken-Serie results ===
Year	Team	Car	Class	1	2	3	4	5	6	7	8	9	Pos.	Points
2018	Team Securtal Sorg Rennsport	BMW M235i Racing	SP8T	VLN; 1	VLN; 2	VLN; 3	VLN; 4	VLN; 5	VLN; 6	VLN; 7	**VLN**; **8**; 1	VLN; 9	669th	5
2019	Team AVIA Sorg Rennsport	BMW M240i Racing	Cup5	VLN; 1; 11	VLN; 2	VLN; 3	VLN; 4	VLN; 5	VLN; 6	VLN; 7	VLN; 8	VLN; 9	765th	3
2022	Falken Motorsports	Porsche 911 GT3 R	SP9	NÜR; 1	NÜR; 2	NÜR; 3	NÜR; 4 WD	NÜR; 5; 1	NÜR; 6; 1	NÜR; 7	NÜR; 8	NÜR; 9	NC†	0
2023	Falken Motorsports	Porsche 911 GT3 R	SP9	NÜR; 1; 12	NÜR; 2; 9	NÜR; 3	NÜR; 4	NÜR; 5; 1	NÜR; 6	NÜR; 7	NÜR; 8	NÜR; 9	NC†	0
2024	Falken Motorsports	Porsche 911 GT3 R (992)	SP9	NÜR; 1; 1	NÜR; 2; 3	24H-Q1	24H-Q2	NÜR; 3	NÜR; 4	NÜR; 5; 11	NÜR; 6		NC†	0

^{†}As Eriksson was a guest driver, he was ineligible for points.

=== Complete British GT Championship results ===
(key) (Races in bold indicate pole position) (Races in italics indicate fastest lap)

Year	Team	Car	Class	1	2	3	4	5	6	7	8	9	DC	Points
2022	Century Motorsport	BMW M4 GT3	GT3	OUL; 1	OUL; 2	SIL; 1	DON; 1	SNE; 1; 14	SNE; 2; 29	SPA; 1; 11	BRH; 1	DON; 1	NC	0

=== Complete Formula E results ===
(key) (Races in bold indicate pole position; races in italics indicate fastest lap)

Year	Team	Chassis	Powertrain	1	2	3	4	5	6	7	8	9	10	11	12	13	14	15	16	17	Pos	Points
2020–21	Dragon / Penske Autosport	Spark SRT05e	Penske EV-5	DIR	DIR	RME	RME	VLC	VLC	MCO	PUE; 17	PUE; 15	NYC; 17	NYC; 22	LDN; 16	LDN; 10	BER; 16	BER; 16			25th	1
2023–24	Envision Racing	Formula E Gen3	Jaguar I-Type 6	MEX	DRH	DRH	SAP	TOK	MIS	MIS	MCO	BER; Ret	BER; 9	SIC	SIC	POR	POR	LDN	LDN		24th	2
2025–26	Envision Racing	Formula E Gen3 Evo	Jaguar I-Type 7	SAO; 7	MEX; 14	MIA; 4	JED; 18	JED; 13	MAD; 10	BER; 16	BER; 10	MCO; 6	MCO; 7	SAN; 12	SHA; 7	SHA; 3	TKO; 12	TKO; Ret	LDN; 14	LDN; Ret	16th	55

Sporting positions
Preceded by Antonio Giovinazzi	Masters of Formula 3 Winner; 2016	Succeeded by Incumbent
Preceded by Charles Leclerc	FIA European Formula 3 Championship; Rookie Champion; 2016	Succeeded by Lando Norris
