= Man in Motion =

Man in Motion may refer to:

- Man in Motion (Night Ranger album), 1988
- Man in Motion (Warren Haynes album), 2011
- Motion (gridiron football), offensive move
- Man in Motion World Tour, an around-the-world fundraising wheelchair journey by Rick Hansen
- "St. Elmo's Fire (Man in Motion)", a 1985 song by John Parr
