= Maarten Steinbuch =

Dutch scientist

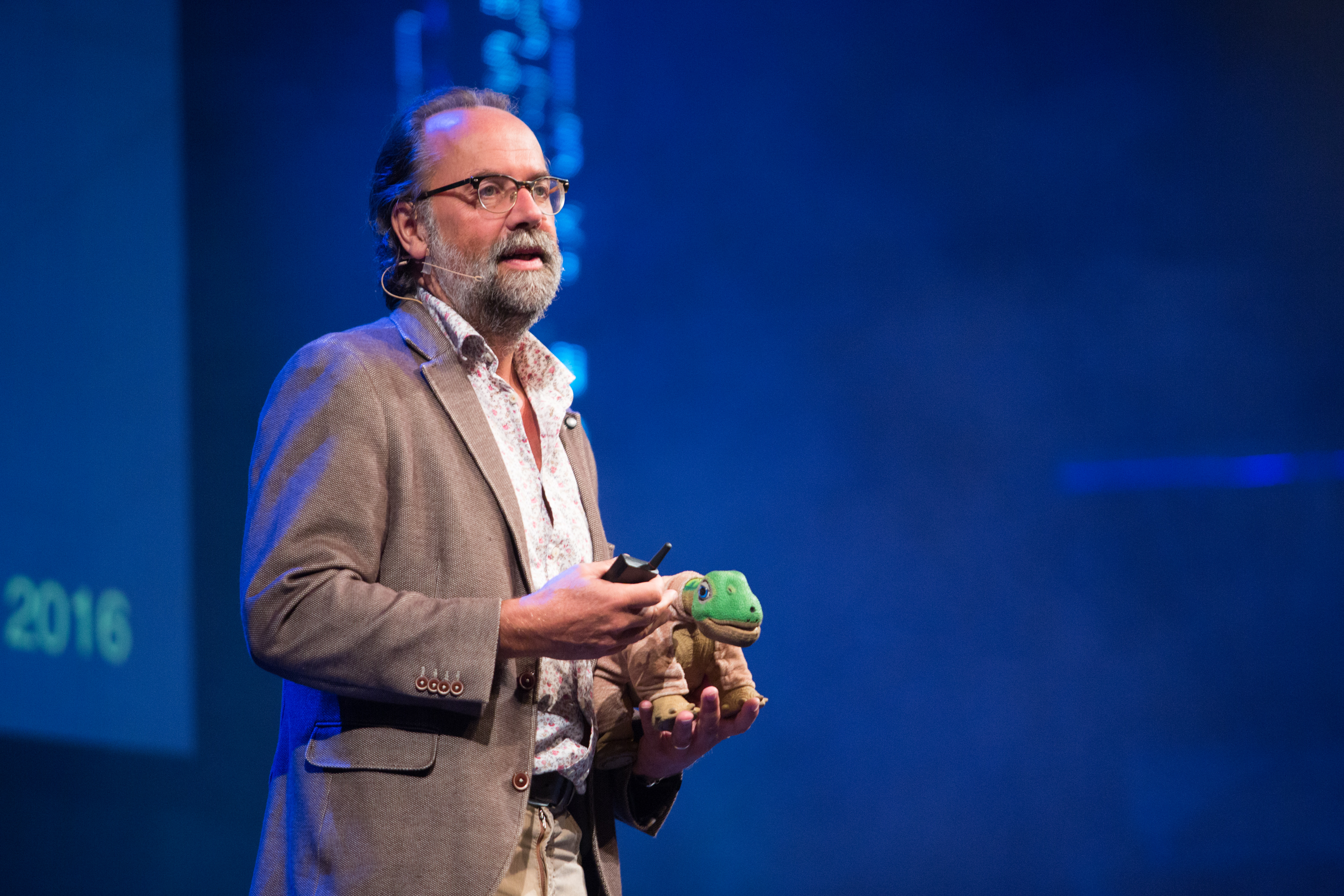
- Maarten Steinbuch at the SingularityU The Netherlands Summit 2016
- Born: Maarten Steinbuch; 14 May 1960 (age 66); Zeist, Netherlands
- Education: Delft University of Technology
- Scientific career
- Fields: Mechanical engineering, control systems technology
- Workplaces: Eindhoven University of Technology
- Website: https://steinbuch.wordpress.com/

Maarten Steinbuch (born 1960) is a Dutch high-tech systems scientist, entrepreneur and communicator. He holds the chair of Systems & Control at Eindhoven University of Technology (TU/e), where he is Distinguished University Professor. His research spans from automotive engineering (with a focus on connected cars and clean vehicles) to mechatronics, motion control, and fusion plasma control. He is most known for his work in the field of advanced motion control, as well as in robotics for high precision surgery. Steinbuch is a prolific blogger and a key opinion leader on the influence of new technologies on society. He is well known as an advocate of electric vehicles.

== Education, career and awards ==
Maarten Steinbuch studied Mechanical Engineering at Delft University of Technology where he graduated cum laude in 1984 and obtained his PhD in 1989. In 1987 he started his career at Philips, where he worked as researcher at Philips Research (1987-1998) and as group leader at Philips CFT (1998-1999).

In 1999 Steinbuch became full professor Systems and Control at Eindhoven University of Technology, where he heads the research group Control Systems Technology at the Mechanical Engineering department. From 2006-2017 he acted as scientific director of the 4TU Research Centre High Tech Systems of 4TU, the Federation of Dutch Technical Universities. In 2013 he was appointed Distinguished University Professor at TU/e and in 2014 Scientific Director of the TU/e High Tech Systems Center, which was established on his initiative.

In 2003, 2005, 2008 and 2015 Steinbuch obtained the 'Best-Teacher' award of the Department of Mechanical Engineering at TU/e. In 2015 he won the first Academic Society Award of the Royal Netherlands Society of Engineers (KIVI). In 2016 he was honored as Simon Stevin Meester by Technology Foundation STW - the highest Dutch award for scientific technological research.

== Research and relevance ==
With his research in the fields of systems and control and mechatronics, Steinbuch has made significant contributions to domains such as high-tech motion systems, robotics, nuclear fusion, and automotive engineering.

He has developed new techniques to accommodate reference and disturbance induced errors, based on repetitive control, iterative learning and motion feedback control. His group is well known for developing and applying principles for the mechanical design of high-tech systems ('design for stiffness') which enabled the high reproducibility and low-cost manufacturing of such systems, which has benefited the high-tech industry in the Brainport Eindhoven region (ASML, Philips, Océ, FEI, and various SMEs).

Steinbuch's research led to the improvement of high-performance robots for precision domestic care and medical surgery. He developed predictive models and implemented these in an integrated design strategy, taking into account all phenomena relevant to the robot's performance. His medical robotic systems perform close to the limits of what is physically possible, allowing highly precise surgical procedures. The design methodology of motion feedforward control was further explored for cooperative driving applications, resulting in a highly cited 2010 IEEE Trans. Vehicular Technology paper.

Maarten Steinbuch has supervised over 500 master students, 60 PhD students and published more than 300 peer-reviewed conference contributions and articles in peer-reviewed journals. His research group Control Systems Technology received the highest academic rating in the two most recent evaluations (2008 and 2013). Steinbuch has an H-index of over 25 in Web of Science and over 45 in Google Scholar, with more than 9000 citations. He gave over 80 invited lectures including many keynote speeches at conferences including the American Control Conference 2011, IFAC Symposium on System Identification (Sysid), IEEE Multi-Conference on Systems and Control (MCS) 2013, and IFAC Mechatronics. He was Editor-in-Chief of the leading journal IFAC Mechatronics (2008-2015), and Associate Editor of IEEE Transactions on Control Systems Technology (2003-2008). Steinbuch holds 9 patents.

== Entrepreneurship and valorisation ==
An important leitmotiv in Steinbuch's career is the concurrent focus on fundamental research as well as valorisation. He is member of advisory and supervisory boards at multiple companies and foundations and (co-)founded start-up companies including MI-Partners, Mechatronics Academy, Steinbuch in Motion, Eindhoven Medical Robotics, Preceyes The latter three are in the field of high precision surgical robotics, eye surgery (Preceyes), and vascular surgery (Microsure). As CEO of Eindhoven Medical Robotics, Steinbuch has expressed the ambition to create more than 1000 jobs within 10 years in Eindhoven and create an industry on designing, building and selling-high tech medical equipment.

Steinbuch has been involved in initiatives aimed at strengthening collaboration between academic and industry in the Eindhoven Brainport region and at the national level. He is a faculty member of SingularityU NL and has participated as a keynote speaker at international SingularityU events.

He has outlined a concept of a "next generation university," in which academic institutions function as open innovation environments with participation from industry, the arts, government, and other sectors. Elements of this approach have been explored through regional collaborations between knowledge institutions and industry, including the Eindhoven Engine initiative.

== Outreach ==
Steinbuch is a frequent blogger, reaching out to peers, industry and society on various subjects. He maintains a website and is an active member of the Twitter community. He is a regular guest at Dutch national radio and television programs such as the prime-time show De Wereld Draait Door and is often interviewed in newspapers. At an international level he appeared in BBC World and BBC news (UK), RTL West and ARD (Germany). From 2001-2015 Steinbuch was chairman of the 'Stichting Techniekpromotie' educating and inspiring children aged 4–18 in science and technology. Steinbuch has inspired the establishment of TU/e student teams participating in the World Solar Challenge for solar powered vehicles (the TU/e car 'Stella' won the Cruiser Class in 2013, 2015, and 2017), RoboCup for robot soccer (the TU/e Tech United team is a five time world champion in the midsize league), and RoboCup for service robots (the TU/e Tech United team is world champion in the @Home Standard Platform League).

== Personal life ==
Steinbuch currently lives in Helmond with his wife Inge Steinbuch-Linstra. Together they have three children. In 2016 and 2017 the couple published the "Slimme Scheurkalender" ('smart day calendar') of which 10.000 copies were sold. The revenues were used to sponsor the aforementioned TU/e student teams and the Stichting Techniekpromotie.
