= 2016 Masters of Formula 3 =

Race details
Date	21 August 2016
Official name	Masters of Formula 3
Location	Circuit Park Zandvoort, Netherlands
Course	4.307 km (2.676 mi)
Distance	Qualifying Race; 12 laps, 51.684 km (32.115 mi); Main Race; 25 laps, 107.675 km (66.906 mi)
- Qualifying Race

Pole
Driver	(United Kingdom) Callum Ilott	Van Amersfoort Racing
Time	1:29.820

Fastest Lap
Driver	(Sweden) Joel Eriksson	Motopark
- Time

Podium
First	(Sweden) Joel Eriksson	Motopark
Second	(United Kingdom) Callum Ilott	Van Amersfoort Racing
Third	(Finland) Niko Kari	Motopark
- Main Race

Pole
Driver	(Sweden) Joel Eriksson	Motopark

Fastest Lap
Driver	(China) Guanyu Zhou	Motopark
Time	1:31.709 (on lap 31)

Podium
First	(Sweden) Joel Eriksson	Motopark
Second	(Finland) Niko Kari	Motopark
Third	(Brazil) Sérgio Sette Câmara	Motopark

The 2016 Masters of Formula 3 was the 26th and the final edition Masters of Formula 3 event, a non-championship race for cars that conform to Formula Three regulations. The event was held on 21 August 2016 at Circuit Park Zandvoort, in Zandvoort, North Holland and was the 24th time that the circuit held the event.

== Drivers and teams ==
All teams used Dallara chassis:

Team	No.	Driver	Engine	Main series
(United Kingdom) Carlin	1	(Italy) Alessio Lorandi	Volkswagen	2016 FIA European Formula 3 Championship
(United Kingdom) Carlin	3	(United States) Colton Herta	Volkswagen	2016 Euroformula Open Championship
(United Kingdom) Carlin	4	(India) Ameya Vaidyanathan	Volkswagen	2016 Euroformula Open Championship
(United Kingdom) HitechGP	5	(United Kingdom) Harrison Scott	Mercedes	2016 Eurocup Formula Renault 2.0
(United Kingdom) HitechGP	6	(Thailand) Alexander Albon	Mercedes	2016 GP3 Series
(Netherlands) Van Amersfoort Racing	7	(United Kingdom) Callum Ilott	Mercedes	2016 FIA European Formula 3 Championship
(Netherlands) Van Amersfoort Racing	8	(Brazil) Pedro Piquet	Mercedes	2016 FIA European Formula 3 Championship
(Netherlands) Van Amersfoort Racing	9	(France) Anthoine Hubert	Mercedes	2016 FIA European Formula 3 Championship
(Germany) Motopark	10	(Sweden) Joel Eriksson	Volkswagen	2016 FIA European Formula 3 Championship
(Germany) Motopark	11	(China) Guanyu Zhou	Volkswagen	2016 FIA European Formula 3 Championship
(Germany) Motopark	12	(Finland) Niko Kari	Volkswagen	2016 FIA European Formula 3 Championship
(Germany) Motopark	14	(Brazil) Sérgio Sette Câmara	Volkswagen	2016 FIA European Formula 3 Championship
(Germany) kfzteile24 Mücke Motorsport	15	(Germany) David Beckmann	Mercedes	2016 FIA European Formula 3 Championship
(United Kingdom) Fortec Motorsport	17	(United Kingdom) Sam MacLeod	Mercedes	none
(United Kingdom) Fortec Motorsport	18	(Australia) Ricky Capo	Mercedes	2016 Australian GT Championship
(United Kingdom) Double R Racing	19	(Australia) Thomas Randle	Mercedes	2016 BRDC British Formula 3 Championship

== Classification ==
=== Qualifying ===
Pos	No	Driver	Team	Time
1	7	(United Kingdom) Callum Ilott	Van Amersfoort Racing	1:29.820
2	10	(Sweden) Joel Eriksson	Motopark	1:29.832
3	6	(Thailand) Alexander Albon	Hitech GP	1:29.849
4	12	(Finland) Niko Kari	Motopark	1:29.928
5	11	(China) Guanyu Zhou	Motopark	1:30.045
6	8	(Brazil) Pedro Piquet	Van Amersfoort Racing	1:30.069
7	14	(Brazil) Sérgio Sette Câmara	Motopark	1:30.098
8	9	(France) Anthoine Hubert	Van Amersfoort Racing	1:30.189
9	1	(Italy) Alessio Lorandi	Carlin	1:30.234
10	15	(Germany) David Beckmann	kfzteile24 Mücke Motorsport	1:30.450
11	5	(United Kingdom) Harrison Scott	Hitech GP	1:30.807
12	3	(United States) Colton Herta	Carlin	1:31.198
13	17	(United Kingdom) Sam MacLeod	Fortec Motorsport	1:31.398
14	18	(Australia) Ricky Capo	Fortec Motorsport	1:32.195
15	19	(Australia) Thomas Randle	Double R Racing	1:32.325
16	4	(India) Ameya Vaidyanathan	Carlin	1:32.408

=== Qualifying Race ===
Pos	No.	Driver	Team	Laps	Time/Retired	Grid
1	10	(Sweden) Joel Eriksson	Motopark	12	18:33.323	2
2	7	(United Kingdom) Callum Ilott	Van Amersfoort Racing	12	+1.461	1
3	12	(Finland) Niko Kari	Motopark	12	+2.251	4
4	6	(Thailand) Alexander Albon	Hitech GP	12	+5.793	3
5	14	(Brazil) Sérgio Sette Câmara	Motopark	12	+7.670	7
6	8	(Brazil) Pedro Piquet	Van Amersfoort Racing	12	+9.792	6
7	9	(France) Anthoine Hubert	Van Amersfoort Racing	12	+10.753	8
8	1	(Italy) Alessio Lorandi	Carlin	12	+12.022	9
9	15	(Germany) David Beckmann	kfzteile24 Mücke Motorsport	12	+12.831	10
10	11	(China) Guanyu Zhou	Motopark	12	+13.223	5
11	5	(United Kingdom) Harrison Scott	Hitech GP	12	+19.112	11
12	19	(Australia) Thomas Randle	Double R Racing	12	+25.262	15
13	18	(Australia) Ricky Capo	Fortec Motorsport	12	+31.617	14
Ret	17	(United Kingdom) Sam MacLeod	Fortec Motorsport	8	Retired	13
Ret	3	(United States) Colton Herta	Carlin	2	Retired	12
Ret	4	(India) Ameya Vaidyanathan	Carlin	2	Retired	16

=== Race ===
Pos	No.	Driver	Team	Laps	Time/Retired	Grid
1	10	(Sweden) Joel Eriksson	Motopark	25		1
2	12	(Finland) Niko Kari	Motopark	25		3
3	14	(Brazil) Sérgio Sette Câmara	Motopark	25		5
4	7	(United Kingdom) Callum Ilott	Van Amersfoort Racing	25		2
5	6	(Thailand) Alexander Albon	Hitech GP	25		4
6	8	(Brazil) Pedro Piquet	Van Amersfoort Racing	25		6
7	9	(France) Anthoine Hubert	Van Amersfoort Racing	25		7
8	1	(Italy) Alessio Lorandi	Carlin	25		8
9	17	(United Kingdom) Sam MacLeod	Fortec Motorsport	25		14
10	15	(Germany) David Beckmann	kfzteile24 Mücke Motorsport	25		9
11	19	(Australia) Thomas Randle	Double R Racing	25		12
12	5	(United Kingdom) Harrison Scott	Hitech GP	25		11
13	3	(United States) Colton Herta	Carlin	25		15
14	18	(Australia) Ricky Capo	Fortec Motorsport	25		13
15	4	(India) Ameya Vaidyanathan	Carlin	25		16
16	11	(China) Guanyu Zhou	Motopark	25		10
