= 2016 FIA Formula 3 European Championship =

The 2016 FIA Formula 3 European Championship was the 2016 season of a multi-event motor racing championship for single-seat open wheel formula racing cars that is held across Europe. The championship features drivers competing in two-litre Formula Three racing cars which conform to the technical regulations, or formula, for the championship. It is the fifth edition of the FIA Formula 3 European Championship.

Felix Rosenqvist was the defending drivers' champion, but was unable to defend his title, because of a new rule which determined that drivers could spend no more than three years in the category. His team, Prema Powerteam, were the defending winners of the teams' championship.

2016 was the final season that the Dallara F312 chassis package, which débuted in the 2012 season, was used in competition, as a brand new chassis package was introduced for 2017.

== Teams and drivers ==
The following teams and drivers competed during the 2016 season:

Team	Chassis (Note: All drivers competed in Dallara chassis; model listed.)	Engine	No.	Driver	Status	Rounds
(Italy) Prema Powerteam	F316/002	Mercedes	1	(Canada) Lance Stroll		All
(Italy) Prema Powerteam	F314/015	Mercedes	2	(New Zealand) Nick Cassidy (Note: Ineligible to score points for the team in the teams' championship at rounds 1-3, 5, 8, 10.)		All
(Italy) Prema Powerteam	F315/005	Mercedes	16	(Estonia) Ralf Aron (Note: Ineligible to score points for the team in the teams' championship.)	R	All
(Italy) Prema Powerteam	F315/006	Mercedes	17	(Germany) Maximilian Günther (Note: Ineligible to score points for the team in the teams' championship at rounds 4, 6-7, 9.)		All
(United Kingdom) Carlin	F316/014	Volkswagen	3	(United States) Ryan Tveter (Note: Ineligible to score points for the team in the teams' championship at round 5.)		1–7
(United Kingdom) Carlin	F312/004	Volkswagen	3	(United Kingdom) Dan Ticktum	R G	10
(United Kingdom) Carlin	F315/016	Volkswagen	4	(Italy) Alessio Lorandi		1–7
(United Kingdom) Carlin	F312/010	Volkswagen	4	(United Kingdom) Lando Norris	R G	10
(United Kingdom) Carlin	F314/020	Volkswagen	18	(China) Peter Li		1–4
(United Kingdom) Carlin	F314/020	Volkswagen	18	(United Kingdom) William Buller		5
(United Kingdom) Carlin	F312/040	Volkswagen	18	(United Kingdom) Jake Hughes		10
(United Kingdom) Carlin	F315/001	Volkswagen	19	(South Africa) Raoul Hyman		1
(United Kingdom) Carlin	F315/001	Volkswagen	19	(Malaysia) Weiron Tan		4, 6–7
(Netherlands) Van Amersfoort Racing	F316/010	Mercedes	5	(Brazil) Pedro Piquet (Note: Ineligible to score points for the team in the teams' championship at rounds 2-4, 6-10.)		All
(Netherlands) Van Amersfoort Racing	F316/017	Mercedes	6	(United Kingdom) Callum Ilott (Note: Ineligible to score points for the team in the teams' championship at round 1.)		All
(Netherlands) Van Amersfoort Racing	F316/001	Mercedes	20	(United Kingdom) Harrison Newey	R	All
(Netherlands) Van Amersfoort Racing	F312/052	Mercedes	21	(France) Anthoine Hubert (Note: Ineligible to score points for the team in the teams' championship at round 5.)	R	All
(Germany) kfzteile24 Mücke Motorsport	F316/007	Mercedes	7	(Denmark) Mikkel Jensen		All
(Germany) kfzteile24 Mücke Motorsport	F316/012	Mercedes	8	(Germany) David Beckmann	R	3–10
(Germany) Motopark	F316/020	Volkswagen	9	(Brazil) Sérgio Sette Câmara (Note: Ineligible to score points for the team in the teams' championship at rounds 8-9.)		All
(Germany) Motopark	F315/003	Volkswagen	10	(Finland) Niko Kari (Note: Ineligible to score points for the team in the teams' championship at rounds 1, 3-8, 10.)	R	All
(Germany) Motopark	F315/007	Volkswagen	22	(Sweden) Joel Eriksson (Note: Ineligible to score points for the team in the teams' championship at round 2.)	R	All
(Germany) Motopark	F314/016	Volkswagen	23	(China) Guanyu Zhou (Note: Ineligible to score points for the team in the teams' championship at rounds 1-7, 10.)	R	All
(United Kingdom) HitechGP	F316/018	Mercedes	11	(Russia) Nikita Mazepin	R	All
(United Kingdom) HitechGP	F315/010	Mercedes	12	(United Kingdom) George Russell		All
(United Kingdom) HitechGP	F316/022	Mercedes	24	(United Kingdom) Ben Barnicoat	R	All
(United Kingdom) HitechGP	F315/009	Mercedes	25	(United Kingdom) Alexander Sims	G	10
(United Kingdom) Threebond with T-Sport	F314/019	NBE	14	(India) Arjun Maini		2–4
(United Kingdom) Threebond with T-Sport	F316/008	NBE	14	(Macau) Wing Chung Chang		9–10
(United Kingdom) Threebond with T-Sport	F316/008	Threebond	15	(India) Arjun Maini		1
(United Kingdom) Threebond with T-Sport	F314/019	Threebond	15	(Japan) Ukyo Sasahara	R	7, 9

Icon	Legend
R	Rookie Cup
G	Guest drivers ineligible to score points

=== Driver changes ===
Joining FIA European Formula 3

- 2015 Italian F4 champion Ralf Aron entered the series with Prema Powerteam.
- Ben Barnicoat, who came fourth in the 2015 Eurocup Formula Renault 2.0 season, joined the series with HitechGP, after an initial deal with Prema Powerteam fell through.
- David Beckmann, who raced in ADAC Formula 4, continued his collaboration with Mücke Motorsport into the championship, but missed the first two rounds on account of his age.
- Nick Cassidy, who raced for Prema Powerteam in two rounds of the 2015 season, raced full-time with the team.
- ADAC Formula 4 runner-up Joel Eriksson, brother of GP3 driver Jimmy Eriksson, joined the series with Motopark.
- Anthoine Hubert, who finished fifth in the 2015 Eurocup Formula Renault 2.0 season, joined the series with Van Amersfoort Racing.
- 2015 SMP F4 champion and Red Bull Junior driver Niko Kari joined the series with Motopark.
- Nikita Mazepin joined the series with HitechGP.
- Harrison Newey, son of F1 engineer Adrian Newey and runner-up in BRDC Formula 4, made his debut in the series with Van Amersfoort Racing.
- Pedro Piquet, son of three time Formula One champion Nelson Piquet and two-time Brazilian Formula Three champion, stepped up to the series with Van Amersfoort Racing.
- 2015 Italian F4 runner-up Guanyu Zhou joined the championship with Motopark.

Changing Teams

- Maximilian Günther, who raced for Mücke Motorsport for most of 2015 before switching to Prema Powerteam during the last round, stayed with Prema in 2016.
- Raoul Hyman switched from Team West-Tec F3 to Carlin.
- Callum Ilott, who raced for Carlin in 2015, switched to Van Amersfoort Racing.
- Zhi Cong Li switched from Fortec Motorsports to Carlin.
- Alessio Lorandi, who raced for Van Amersfoort in 2015, switched to Carlin.
- Arjun Maini, switched from Van Amersfoort Racing to T-Sport.
- George Russell, who raced for Carlin in 2015, switched to HitechGP.

Leaving Formula 3

- Jake Dennis, Tatiana Calderón and Santino Ferrucci, who finished third, 27th and 11th in the 2015 season, stepped up to GP3 with Arden International and DAMS respectively.
- Rookie champion Charles Leclerc and Alexander Albon, who finished fourth and seventh in 2015 respectively, left the series to compete in GP3 with ART Grand Prix.
- 2015 runner-up Antonio Giovinazzi stepped up to GP2 with Prema Powerteam.
- Pietro Fittipaldi, who finished 17th in 2015, stepped up to Formula V8 3.5 with Fortec.
- 2015 champion Felix Rosenqvist was ruled out of returning to the series due to a new rule, which said that drivers could spend no more than three years in the category. He joined the Indy Lights with Belardi Auto Racing.

=== Team changes ===
- After making two appearances in the 2015 season, HitechGP returned full-time to the series, in collaboration with ART Grand Prix.
- Double R Racing, Signature Team, EuroInternational, Team West-Tec and Artline Engineering withdrew.

== Calendar ==
A provisional ten-round calendar was announced on 2 December 2015.

Round		Circuit	Date	Supporting
1	1	(France) Circuit Paul Ricard, Le Castellet	2 April	World Touring Car Championship
1	2	(France) Circuit Paul Ricard, Le Castellet	2 April	World Touring Car Championship
1	3	(France) Circuit Paul Ricard, Le Castellet	3 April	World Touring Car Championship
2	4	(Hungary) Hungaroring, Mogyoród	23 April	World Touring Car Championship
2	5	(Hungary) Hungaroring, Mogyoród	23 April	World Touring Car Championship
2	6	(Hungary) Hungaroring, Mogyoród	24 April	World Touring Car Championship
3	7	(France) Circuit de Pau-Ville, Pau	14 May	Pau Grand Prix
3	8	(France) Circuit de Pau-Ville, Pau	14 May	Pau Grand Prix
3	9	(France) Circuit de Pau-Ville, Pau	15 May	Pau Grand Prix
4	10	(Austria) Red Bull Ring, Spielberg	21 May	Deutsche Tourenwagen Masters
4	11	(Austria) Red Bull Ring, Spielberg	21 May	Deutsche Tourenwagen Masters
4	12	(Austria) Red Bull Ring, Spielberg	22 May	Deutsche Tourenwagen Masters
5	13	(Germany) Norisring, Nuremberg	25 June	Deutsche Tourenwagen Masters
5	14	(Germany) Norisring, Nuremberg	25 June	Deutsche Tourenwagen Masters
5	15	(Germany) Norisring, Nuremberg	26 June	Deutsche Tourenwagen Masters
6	16	(Netherlands) Circuit Park Zandvoort, Zandvoort	16 July	Deutsche Tourenwagen Masters
6	17	(Netherlands) Circuit Park Zandvoort, Zandvoort	16 July	Deutsche Tourenwagen Masters
6	18	(Netherlands) Circuit Park Zandvoort, Zandvoort	17 July	Deutsche Tourenwagen Masters
7	19	(Belgium) Circuit de Spa-Francorchamps, Francorchamps	29 July	24 Hours of Spa; Blancpain GT Series Endurance Cup
7	20	(Belgium) Circuit de Spa-Francorchamps, Francorchamps	29 July	24 Hours of Spa; Blancpain GT Series Endurance Cup
7	21	(Belgium) Circuit de Spa-Francorchamps, Francorchamps	30 July	24 Hours of Spa; Blancpain GT Series Endurance Cup
8	22	(Germany) Nürburgring, Rhineland-Palatinate	10 September	Deutsche Tourenwagen Masters
8	23	(Germany) Nürburgring, Rhineland-Palatinate	10 September	Deutsche Tourenwagen Masters
8	24	(Germany) Nürburgring, Rhineland-Palatinate	11 September	Deutsche Tourenwagen Masters
9	25	(Italy) Autodromo Enzo e Dino Ferrari, Imola	1 October	European Touring Car Cup; FFSA GT Championship
9	26	(Italy) Autodromo Enzo e Dino Ferrari, Imola	2 October	European Touring Car Cup; FFSA GT Championship
9	27	(Italy) Autodromo Enzo e Dino Ferrari, Imola	2 October	European Touring Car Cup; FFSA GT Championship
10	28	(Germany) Hockenheimring, Baden-Württemberg	15 October	Deutsche Tourenwagen Masters
10	29	(Germany) Hockenheimring, Baden-Württemberg	16 October	Deutsche Tourenwagen Masters
10	30	(Germany) Hockenheimring, Baden-Württemberg	16 October	Deutsche Tourenwagen Masters

== Results ==
Round		Circuit	Pole position	Fastest lap	Winning driver	Winning team	Rookie winner
1	R1	(France) Circuit Paul Ricard	(Canada) Lance Stroll	(Canada) Lance Stroll	(Canada) Lance Stroll	(Italy) Prema Powerteam	(United Kingdom) Ben Barnicoat
1	R2	(France) Circuit Paul Ricard	(Germany) Maximilian Günther	(New Zealand) Nick Cassidy	(United Kingdom) Callum Ilott	(Netherlands) Van Amersfoort Racing	(China) Guanyu Zhou
1	R3	(France) Circuit Paul Ricard	(Germany) Maximilian Günther	(Sweden) Joel Eriksson	(Germany) Maximilian Günther	(Italy) Prema Powerteam	(Sweden) Joel Eriksson
2	R1	(Hungary) Hungaroring	(Germany) Maximilian Günther	(Sweden) Joel Eriksson	(Estonia) Ralf Aron	(Italy) Prema Powerteam	(Estonia) Ralf Aron
2	R2	(Hungary) Hungaroring	(Germany) Maximilian Günther	(Germany) Maximilian Günther	(Germany) Maximilian Günther	(Italy) Prema Powerteam	(Estonia) Ralf Aron
2	R3	(Hungary) Hungaroring	(Germany) Maximilian Günther	(Canada) Lance Stroll	(United Kingdom) Ben Barnicoat	(United Kingdom) HitechGP	(United Kingdom) Ben Barnicoat
3	R1	(France) Circuit de Pau-Ville	(Canada) Lance Stroll	(United Kingdom) Callum Ilott	(United Kingdom) Ben Barnicoat	(United Kingdom) HitechGP	(United Kingdom) Ben Barnicoat
3	R2	(France) Circuit de Pau-Ville	(United Kingdom) George Russell	(United Kingdom) George Russell	(United Kingdom) George Russell	(United Kingdom) HitechGP	(United Kingdom) Ben Barnicoat
3	R3	(France) Circuit de Pau-Ville	(Italy) Alessio Lorandi	(France) Anthoine Hubert	(Italy) Alessio Lorandi	(United Kingdom) Carlin	(Sweden) Joel Eriksson
4	R1	(Austria) Red Bull Ring	(United Kingdom) Callum Ilott	(United Kingdom) Callum Ilott	(United Kingdom) Callum Ilott	(Netherlands) Van Amersfoort Racing	(Germany) David Beckmann
4	R2	(Austria) Red Bull Ring	(Canada) Lance Stroll	(Brazil) Sérgio Sette Câmara	(Canada) Lance Stroll	(Italy) Prema Powerteam	(Finland) Niko Kari
4	R3	(Austria) Red Bull Ring	(Canada) Lance Stroll	(Canada) Lance Stroll	(Canada) Lance Stroll	(Italy) Prema Powerteam	(United Kingdom) Ben Barnicoat
5	R1	(Germany) Norisring	(Canada) Lance Stroll	(United Kingdom) Callum Ilott	(Canada) Lance Stroll	(Italy) Prema Powerteam	(Finland) Niko Kari
5	R2	(Germany) Norisring	(France) Anthoine Hubert	(Canada) Lance Stroll	(France) Anthoine Hubert	(Netherlands) Van Amersfoort Racing	(France) Anthoine Hubert
5	R3	(Germany) Norisring	(Canada) Lance Stroll	(Italy) Alessio Lorandi	(Canada) Lance Stroll	(Italy) Prema Powerteam	(France) Anthoine Hubert
6	R1	(Netherlands) Circuit Park Zandvoort	(New Zealand) Nick Cassidy	(Canada) Lance Stroll	(Canada) Lance Stroll	(Italy) Prema Powerteam	(Finland) Niko Kari
6	R2	(Netherlands) Circuit Park Zandvoort	(United Kingdom) Callum Ilott	(Germany) Maximilian Günther	(New Zealand) Nick Cassidy	(Italy) Prema Powerteam	(France) Anthoine Hubert
6	R3	(Netherlands) Circuit Park Zandvoort	(Germany) Maximilian Günther	(Canada) Lance Stroll	(Germany) Maximilian Günther	(Italy) Prema Powerteam	(Germany) David Beckmann
7	R1	(Belgium) Circuit de Spa-Francorchamps	(Canada) Lance Stroll	(Canada) Lance Stroll	(Canada) Lance Stroll	(Italy) Prema Powerteam	(United Kingdom) Ben Barnicoat
7	R2	(Belgium) Circuit de Spa-Francorchamps	(United Kingdom) George Russell	(United Kingdom) George Russell	(United Kingdom) George Russell	(United Kingdom) HitechGP	(Sweden) Joel Eriksson
7	R3	(Belgium) Circuit de Spa-Francorchamps	(United Kingdom) George Russell	(United Kingdom) George Russell	(Sweden) Joel Eriksson	(Germany) Motopark	(Sweden) Joel Eriksson
8	R1	(Germany) Nürburgring	(Canada) Lance Stroll	(Canada) Lance Stroll	(Canada) Lance Stroll	(Italy) Prema Powerteam	(Estonia) Ralf Aron
8	R2	(Germany) Nürburgring	(Canada) Lance Stroll	(Germany) Maximilian Günther	(Canada) Lance Stroll	(Italy) Prema Powerteam	(Sweden) Joel Eriksson
8	R3	(Germany) Nürburgring	(Germany) Maximilian Günther	(Germany) Maximilian Günther	(Germany) Maximilian Günther	(Italy) Prema Powerteam	(Finland) Niko Kari
9	R1	(Italy) Autodromo Enzo e Dino Ferrari	(Canada) Lance Stroll	(Canada) Lance Stroll	(Finland) Niko Kari	(Germany) Motopark	(Finland) Niko Kari
9	R2	(Italy) Autodromo Enzo e Dino Ferrari	(Canada) Lance Stroll	(Canada) Lance Stroll	(Canada) Lance Stroll	(Italy) Prema Powerteam	(Sweden) Joel Eriksson
9	R3	(Italy) Autodromo Enzo e Dino Ferrari	(Canada) Lance Stroll	(Canada) Lance Stroll	(Canada) Lance Stroll	(Italy) Prema Powerteam	(Estonia) Ralf Aron
10	R1	(Germany) Hockenheimring	(Canada) Lance Stroll	(Canada) Lance Stroll	(Canada) Lance Stroll	(Italy) Prema Powerteam	(Estonia) Ralf Aron
10	R2	(Germany) Hockenheimring	(Canada) Lance Stroll	(Germany) David Beckmann	(Canada) Lance Stroll	(Italy) Prema Powerteam	(Sweden) Joel Eriksson
10	R3	(Germany) Hockenheimring	(Sweden) Joel Eriksson	(Canada) Lance Stroll	(Canada) Lance Stroll	(Italy) Prema Powerteam	(Sweden) Joel Eriksson

== Championship standings ==
Scoring system

Position	**1st**	**2nd**	**3rd**	**4th**	**5th**	**6th**	**7th**	**8th**	**9th**	**10th**
Points	25	18	15	12	10	8	6	4	2	1

=== Drivers' championship ===
Pos.	Driver	LEC (France)			HUN (Hungary)			PAU (France)			RBR (Austria)			NOR (Germany)			ZAN (Netherlands)			SPA (Belgium)			NÜR (Germany)			IMO (Italy)			HOC (Germany)			Points
Pos.	Driver	R1	R2	R3	R1	R2	R3	R1	R2	R3	R1	R2	R3	R1	R2	R3	R1	R2	R3	R1	R2	R3	R1	R2	R3	R1	R2	R3	R1	R2	R3	Points
1	(Canada) Lance Stroll	**1**	Ret	5	4	8	3	**9**	4	2	2	**1**	**1**	**1**	2	**1**	1	Ret	Ret	**1**	Ret	4	**1**	**1**	2	**2**	**1**	**1**	**1**	**1**	1	507
2	(Germany) Maximilian Günther	5	**Ret**	**1**	**5**	**1**	**Ret**	3	14	13	3	6	3	Ret	3	5	4	2	**1**	2	7	6	2	2	**1**	12	Ret	12	2	8	9	320
3	(United Kingdom) George Russell	3	11	18	Ret	4	Ret	4	**1**	3	5	2	Ret	3	9	Ret	7	9	5	5	**1**	**3**	3	Ret	7	4	3	2	7	6	Ret	264
4	(New Zealand) Nick Cassidy	2	2	2	Ret	16	9	2	16	Ret	6	Ret	10	6	4	6	**2**	1	2	4	17	5	4	Ret	5	10	7	8	3	Ret	4	254
5	(Sweden) Joel Eriksson	6	9	3	3	Ret	2	14	9	6	17	14	6	Ret	5	Ret	12	10	7	14	2	1	7	3	6	3	2	5	6	2	**2**	252
6	(United Kingdom) Callum Ilott	10	1	12	Ret	9	6	5	3	4	**1**	4	2	Ret	7	7	5	**3**	6	16	5	Ret	5	7	4	15	Ret	3	Ret	DSQ	Ret	226
7	(Estonia) Ralf Aron	7	Ret	7	1	2	DNS	13	6	15	9	12	9	4	10	9	14	6	8	8	14	13	6	4	14	7	4	4	4	5	8	166
8	(France) Anthoine Hubert	17	8	6	Ret	13	14	12	7	12	16	10	16	8	**1**	2	9	4	10	Ret	4	2	10	5	9	5	6	6	10	7	10	160
9	(United Kingdom) Ben Barnicoat	4	Ret	11	9	10	1	1	5	11	10	15	5	5	Ret	DSQ	18	8	9	3	11	20	9	Ret	10	8	Ret	13	18	9	7	134
10	(Finland) Niko Kari	8	16	15	2	Ret	8	19	11	8	20	3	8	2	12	Ret	6	11	11	11	10	7	8	10	3	1	9	Ret	14	12	13	129
11	(Brazil) Sérgio Sette Câmara	16	5	19	7	5	5	8	2	Ret	12	8	4	Ret	Ret	3	11	17	15	15	Ret	15	11	8	8	Ret	15	11	5	14	6	117
12	(Denmark) Mikkel Jensen	13	4	4	10	7	11	6	8	5	4	5	Ret	7	8	Ret	15	13	12	Ret	3	9	15	13	17	11	10	7	Ret	15	DNS	107
13	(China) Guanyu Zhou	14	3	8	8	3	4	11	Ret	Ret	13	11	7	Ret	6	4	16	18	16	17	8	11	12	12	12	6	5	10	11	13	11	101
14	(Italy) Alessio Lorandi	12	6	9	6	6	12	10	15	**1**	11	9	17	12	Ret	8	3	5	4	10	13	17										96
15	(Germany) David Beckmann							17	Ret	Ret	7	7	12	10	13	Ret	10	7	3	7	16	10	13	6	13	Ret	Ret	9	12	3	18	67
16	(United Kingdom) Jake Hughes																												19	4	3	27
17	(United States) Ryan Tveter	15	7	Ret	11	11	DNS	7	Ret	7	15	DNS	DNS	13	Ret	13	8	14	14	9	9	16										25
18	(United Kingdom) Harrison Newey	9	Ret	14	12	12	10	15	Ret	14	8	16	11	14	Ret	10	19	12	18	6	12	12	14	11	11	9	8	Ret	15	18	12	22
19	(Brazil) Pedro Piquet	11	14	Ret	13	14	7	20	Ret	10	19	Ret	13	9	Ret	Ret	13	16	13	18	6	14	17	9	15	Ret	12	14	16	17	15	19
20	(Russia) Nikita Mazepin	19	12	10	EX	Ret	13	16	13	Ret	14	17	14	11	11	11	17	15	17	12	Ret	8	16	14	16	13	11	15	8	10	Ret	10
21	(India) Arjun Maini	Ret	13	16	14	15	15	18	10	9	Ret	Ret	18																			3
22	(South Africa) Raoul Hyman	18	10	13																												1
23	(China) Peter Li	20	15	17	15	Ret	16	Ret	12	Ret	18	DNS	DNS																			0
24	(United Kingdom) William Buller													Ret	Ret	12																0
25	(Malaysia) Weiron Tan										Ret	13	15				20	19	Ret	Ret	15	18										0
26	(Japan) Ukyo Sasahara																			13	Ret	19				Ret	13	Ret				0
27	(Macau) Wing Chung Chang																									14	14	16	17	19	17	0
Guest drivers ineligible for points
	(United Kingdom) Alexander Sims																												9	11	5	0
	(United Kingdom) Dan Ticktum																												13	20	14	0
	(United Kingdom) Lando Norris																												Ret	16	16	0
Pos.	Driver	R1	R2	R3	R1	R2	R3	R1	R2	R3	R1	R2	R3	R1	R2	R3	R1	R2	R3	R1	R2	R3	R1	R2	R3	R1	R2	R3	R1	R2	R3	Points
Pos.	Driver	LEC (France)			HUN (Hungary)			PAU (France)			RBR (Austria)			NOR (Germany)			ZAN (Netherlands)			SPA (Belgium)			NÜR (Germany)			IMO (Italy)			HOC (Germany)			Points

Colour	Result
Gold	Winner
Silver	Second place
Bronze	Third place
Green	Points classification
Blue	Non-points classification
Blue	Non-classified finish (NC)
Purple	Retired, not classified (Ret)
Red	Did not qualify (DNQ)
Red	Did not pre-qualify (DNPQ)
Black	Disqualified (DSQ)
White	Did not start (DNS)
White	Withdrew (WD)
White	Race cancelled (C)
Blank	Did not practice (DNP)
Blank	Did not arrive (DNA)
Blank	Excluded (EX)

**Bold** – Pole
Italics – Fastest Lap

=== Rookies' Championship ===
Pos.	Driver	LEC (France)			HUN (Hungary)			PAU (France)			RBR (Austria)			NOR (Germany)			ZAN (Netherlands)			SPA (Belgium)			NÜR (Germany)			IMO (Italy)			HOC (Germany)			Points
Pos.	Driver	R1	R2	R3	R1	R2	R3	R1	R2	R3	R1	R2	R3	R1	R2	R3	R1	R2	R3	R1	R2	R3	R1	R2	R3	R1	R2	R3	R1	R2	R3	Points
1	(Sweden) Joel Eriksson	6	9	3	3	Ret	2	14	9	6	17	10	6	Ret	5	Ret	12	10	7	14	2	1	7	3	6	3	2	5	6	2	2	470
2	(Estonia) Ralf Aron	7	Ret	7	1	2	DNS	13	6	15	9	13	9	5	10	9	14	6	8	8	14	13	6	4	14	7	4	4	4	5	8	418
3	(France) Anthoine Hubert	17	8	6	Ret	13	14	12	7	12	12	11	16	8	1	2	9	4	10	Ret	4	2	10	5	9	5	6	6	10	7	10	392
4	(United Kingdom) Ben Barnicoat	4	Ret	11	9	10	1	1	5	11	10	15	5	6	Ret	DSQ	18	8	9	3	11	20	9	Ret	10	8	Ret	13	18	9	7	342
5	(Finland) Niko Kari	8	16	15	2	Ret	8	19	11	8	20	4	8	2	12	Ret	6	11	11	11	10	7	8	10	3	1	9	Ret	14	12	13	340
6	(China) Guanyu Zhou	14	3	8	8	3	4	11	Ret	Ret	14	12	7	Ret	6	4	16	18	16	17	8	11	12	12	12	6	5	10	11	13	11	304
7	(Germany) David Beckmann							17	Ret	Ret	7	7	12	10	13	Ret	10	7	3	7	17	10	13	6	13	Ret	Ret	9	12	3	18	221
8	(United Kingdom) Harrison Newey	9	Ret	14	12	12	10	15	Ret	14	8	16	11	Ret	Ret	10	19	12	18	6	12	12	14	11	11	9	8	Ret	15	18	12	202
9	(Russia) Nikita Mazepin	19	12	10	EX	Ret	13	16	13	Ret	15	17	14	11	11	11	17	15	17	12	Ret	8	16	14	16	13	11	15	8	10	Ret	171
10	(Japan) Ukyo Sasahara																			13	Ret	19				Ret	13	Ret				12
Pos.	Driver	R1	R2	R3	R1	R2	R3	R1	R2	R3	R1	R2	R3	R1	R2	R3	R1	R2	R3	R1	R2	R3	R1	R2	R3	R1	R2	R3	R1	R2	R3	Points
Pos.	Driver	LEC (France)			HUN (Hungary)			PAU (France)			RBR (Austria)			NOR (Germany)			ZAN (Netherlands)			SPA (Belgium)			NÜR (Germany)			IMO (Italy)			HOC (Germany)			Points

=== Teams' championship ===
Prior to each round of the championship, two drivers from each team – if applicable – were nominated to score teams' championship points.

Pos	Team	Points
1	(Italy) Prema Powerteam	780
2	(United Kingdom) HitechGP	499
3	(Germany) Motopark	431
4	(Netherlands) Van Amersfoort Racing	416
5	(Germany) kfzteile24 Mücke Motorsport	297
6	(United Kingdom) Carlin	238
7	(United Kingdom) Threebond with T-Sport	32
