= FIA Formula 3 European Championship =

Former Single-Seater Racing Championship

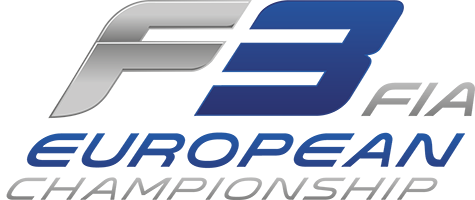
- Category: Single seaters
- Country: Europe
- Inaugural season: 2012
- Folded: 2018
- Drivers: 27 (regularly 21 including wildcard and replacement)
- Teams: 7
- Constructors: Dallara
- Engine suppliers: Mercedes-Benz and Volkswagen
- Tyre suppliers: Hankook
- Last Drivers' champion: (Germany) Mick Schumacher
- Last Teams' champion: (Italy) Prema Theodore Racing
- Official website: Official website

The FIA Formula 3 European Championship was a European Formula Three (F3) auto racing competition, organised by the Fédération Internationale de l'Automobile (FIA). After one season of the FIA Formula 3 International Trophy, the FIA revived the FIA Formula 3 European Championship. The ten-event season included seven Formula 3 Euro Series rounds, two British Formula Three rounds and DTM-supporting round at Brands Hatch. From 2013, the series started running its own rounds, based upon the defunct Formula 3 Euro Series.

In 2019, the series merged with the GP3 Series to form the FIA Formula 3 Championship, and was due to relaunch as the Formula European Masters and run in support of the Deutsche Tourenwagen Masters. The championship was cancelled ahead of its debut season due to lack of competitors. The championship would have used the current spec cars and were working with Dallara to design a new car for 2020, but it was replaced by GT4-based series, DTM Trophy as the successor.

== Car history and current specifications ==
=== Chassis ===
The FIA Formula 3 European Championship is a third-tier single-seater formula car. A spec-series, the championship mandates chassis and engine manufacturers which teams must use each season. The championship controls and specifies the chassis and engine manufacturers that teams are allowed to use each season. The league's choice of manufacturers are changed every three years. Currently, Dallara provides a specification chassis to all teams since inaugural season. Teams are prohibited from performing engine or chassis modifications. The current Dallara F317 features an airboxless roll hoop and also left-side separated airbox on upside sidepod. The chassis construction of Dallara F317 car are carbon-fibre monocoque incorporated with honeycomb structure. The Dallara F317 also includes bi-plane front wing, bi-plane rear wing and also lower nose (similar to current Formula One cars)

==== Transmission, gearbox and clutches ====
For the transmission gearboxes, all FIA Formula 3 European cars currently use a semi-automatic transmission with 6-speed gearbox operated by paddle shifters since the 2012 season. The clutch of all FIA Formula 3 European cars are CFRP 3-plate clutch operated by foot-pedal. Mechanical limited-slip differential are also allowed and constant velocity joint tripod driveshafts are also used. The transmission fluid supplier is currently the RAVENOL F3 Gear premium oil.

==== Brakes ====
AP Racing supplies monobloc brake calipers, cast-iron brake discs, pads and disc bells, which are exclusive to all FIA Formula 3 European cars.

==== Wheel rims ====
ATS exclusively supplies wheel rims for all FIA Formula 3 European cars since the inaugural 2012 season. The wheel rims of all FIA Formula 3 European cars are made of magnesium alloy wheels.

==== Tyres ====
Hankook was the sole tyre partner for the series since the 2012 season until 2018. The FIA Formula 3 European tyres runs the bespoke compounds and smaller size since 2012. The front tyre sizes are 180/550-R13 and the rear tyre sizes are 240/570-R13.

==== Cockpit and other safety components ====
For the safety equipment, all FIA Formula 3 European cars seating uses removable carbon-fibre shell driver's seat with 6-point seat belts. The steering wheel of all FIA Formula 3 European cars are universally supplied by XAP Technologies. All FIA Formula 3 European cars are also equipped with XAP data display units since the 2012 season.

Rear view mirrors for all FIA Formula 3 European cars are fully mandated to easily view opponents behind.

==== Fuel tank ====
The fuel tank of all FIA Formula 3 European cars are made of kevlar-reinforced rubber safety tank supplied by ATL with FT3 standard. Currently the fuel tank capacity of all FIA Formula 3 European cars are 45 litres (12 US gallons) since 2012.

==== Other components ====
All FIA Formula 3 European cars carry a Bosch-provided electronic control unit (Motronic MS 5.8 model), but traction control and anti-lock brakes are prohibited. Live telemetry is used only for television broadcasts, but the data can be recorded from the ECU to the computer if the car is in the garage and not on the track.

=== Engines ===
The cars are powered by naturally-aspirated (no turbocharger or supercharger) direct fuel injection (since 2014) inline-4 engines, with aluminium alloy blocks, and a DOHC valvetrain actuating four-valves per cylinder, and limited to 2.0 L (122 cu in) displacement since the series' inauguration in 2012. DTM car's engines are currently producing over 240 hp (179 kW) power output between 5,000-7,400 rpm. Currently Mercedes-AMG (operated by Mercedes-AMG HPP) and Volkswagen providing the engines currently maximum three teams per one manufacturer. ThreeBond Nissan and Neil Brown Engineering has provided engines in 2012-2016 and 2014-2016 but both companies left at the end of the 2016 season respectively due to competitor reduction to 19 cars.

FIA Formula 3 European engines are rev-limited to 7,400 rpm. The valve train is a dual overhead camshaft configuration with four valves per cylinder. The crankshaft is made of alloy steel, with five main bearing caps. The pistons are forged aluminum alloy, while the connecting rods are machined alloy steel. The firing ignition is a CDI ignition system. The engine lubrication is a dry sump type, cooled by a single water pump.

Engines must be built from a production model block (stock block), and often must be sealed by race or series organizers, so no private tuning can be carried out.

==== Spark plugs ====
All FIA Formula 3 European cars carried a spark plugs are made of iridium and supplied exclusively by Bosch since 2012.

==== Exhaust systems ====
The exhaust systems of all FIA Formula 3 European cars are silencer type but made by titanium with operation of three-way catalytic converter. Currently Remus are providing the exhaust systems.

==== Fuel ====
FIA Formula 3 European cars currently use ordinary fossil unleaded racing fuel, which has been the de facto standard in European third-tier single-seater formula racing since Formula 3 Euroseries in 2003 and the formation of FIA Formula 3 European in 2012. Since the 2005 Formula 3 Euroseries season, per agreement with ITR e.V., which has promoted the series from that to FIA European Formula 3 and later Formula European Masters, BP is the official fuel supplier using their German Aral Ultimate brand

Current Aral Ultimate 102 RON unleaded gasoline resembles the ordinary unleaded public vehicles gasoline which has better mileage, environmental-friendly and safer than other fuels.

==== Lubricants ====
The current lubricant supplier of all FIA Formula 3 European cars is Ravenol.

=== Performance ===
According to research and pre-season stability tests, the current model can go 0 to 60 mph in approximately 3 seconds. The car has a top speed of over 160 mph (257 km/h) depending on the circuit and gearing meaning that it is the fourth fastest European single-seater formula car behind Formula 1, Formula 2 and GP3 Series.

=== Specifications ===
- Engine displacement: 2.0 L (122 cu in) DOHC inline-4
- Gearbox: 6-speed paddle shift gearbox + 1 reverse
- Weight: 565 kg (1,246 lb)
- Power output: 240 hp (179 kW)
- Fuel: Aral Ultimate 102 RON unleaded
- Fuel capacity: 45.5 litres (12 US gallons)
- Fuel delivery: Direct fuel injection
- Aspiration: Naturally aspirated
- Length: 4,351 mm (171.3 in)
- Width: 1,845 mm (72.6 in)
- Wheelbase: 2,800 mm (110.2 in)
- Steering: Power-assisted rack and pinion

== Race format ==
Following two practice sessions, the first of two qualifying sessions will be held on Friday afternoon. Race 1 starts on Saturday morning, while Qualifying 2 is usually scheduled for the afternoon. On Sunday, the two remaining races will be held, with Race 2 taking off on Sunday morning and Race 3 concluding the weekend in the afternoon. Each race will consist of 33 minutes plus one lap and covers a distance of about 100 kilometres.

== Champions ==
=== Drivers' ===
Season	Driver	Team	Engine	Poles	Wins	Podiums	Fastest laps	Points	Clinched	Margin	Ref
2012	(Spain) Daniel Juncadella	(Italy) Prema Powerteam	Mercedes	5	5	10	5	252	Race 20 of 20	23.5	
2013	(Italy) Raffaele Marciello	(Italy) Prema Powerteam	Mercedes	12	13	19	8	489.5	Race 29 of 30	32.5	
2014	(France) Esteban Ocon	(Italy) Prema Powerteam	Mercedes	15	9	21	7	478	Race 30 of 33	58	
2015	(Sweden) Felix Rosenqvist	(Italy) Prema Powerteam	Mercedes	17	13	24	13	518	Race 30 of 33	105.5	
2016	(Canada) Lance Stroll	(Italy) Prema Powerteam	Mercedes	14	14	20	13	508	Race 26 of 30	187	
2017	(United Kingdom) Lando Norris	(United Kingdom) Carlin	Volkswagen	8	9	20	8	441	Race 28 of 30	53	
2018	(Germany) Mick Schumacher	(Italy) Prema Theodore Racing	Mercedes	7	8	14	4	365	Race 29 of 30	57	

=== Teams' ===
Season	Team	Engine	Poles	Wins	Podiums	Fastest laps	Points	Clinched	Margin	Ref
2013	(Italy) Prema Powerteam	Mercedes	17	17	42	14	810	Race 27 of 30	206	
2014	(Italy) Prema Powerteam	Mercedes	15	11	34	8	740	Race 31 of 33	36	
2015	(Italy) Prema Powerteam	Mercedes	23	20	46	18	912	Race 28 of 33	379.5	
2016	(Italy) Prema Powerteam	Mercedes	22	20	20	18	780	Race 24 of 30	187	
2017	(Italy) Prema Powerteam	Mercedes	13	11	33	11	829	Race 29 of 30	127	
2018	(Italy) Prema Theodore Racing	Mercedes	16	17	14	11	1003.5	Race 28 of 30	214.5	

=== Rookies' ===
The result of the championship was decided by different standings. Wins and points of the rookie standings are present in brackets.

Season	Driver	Team	Engine	Poles	Wins (rookie)	Podiums	Fastest laps	Points (rookie)	Clinched	Margin	Ref
2014	(France) Esteban Ocon	(Italy) Prema Powerteam	Mercedes	15	9 (15)	21	7	478 (619)	Race 28 of 33	105	
2015	(Monaco) Charles Leclerc	(Netherlands) Van Amersfoort Racing	Volkswagen	3	4 (10)	13	5	363.5 (533.5)	Race 30 of 33	105.5	
2016	(Sweden) Joel Eriksson	(Germany) Motopark	Volkswagen	1	1 (8)	10	2	252 (470)	Race 29 of 30	52	
2017	(United Kingdom) Lando Norris	(United Kingdom) Carlin	Volkswagen	8	9 (21)	20	8	441 (628)	Race 28 of 30	89	
2018	(Russia) Robert Shwartzman	(Italy) Prema Theodore Racing	Mercedes	3	2 (1)	11	1	294 (491.5)	Race 28 of 30	61.5	

== Drivers who graduated to Formula One ==
- **Bold** denotes an active Formula One driver.

Driver	FIA Formula 3					Formula 1				
Driver	Seasons	Races	Wins	Podiums	Best pos.	Seasons	First team	Races	Wins	Podiums
(Russia) Daniil Kvyat	2013	21	1	7	NC†	2014–2017, 2019–2020	Toro Rosso	110	0	3
(Spain) **Carlos Sainz Jr.**	2012	20	1	5	5th	2015–	Toro Rosso	250	4	29
(Brazil) Felipe Nasr	2012	1	0	0	NC†	2015–2016	Sauber	39	0	0
(Netherlands) **Max Verstappen**	2014	32	10	16	**3rd**	2015–	Toro Rosso	254	75	140
(Germany) Pascal Wehrlein	2012–2013	23	2	9	4th	2016–2017	Manor	39	0	0
(France) **Esteban Ocon**	2014	33	9	21	**1st**	2016–2018, 2020–	Manor	198	1	4
(Italy) Antonio Giovinazzi	2013–2015	95	8	27	**2nd**	2017, 2019–2021	Sauber	62	0	0
(Canada) **Lance Stroll**	2015–2016	62	15	26	**1st**	2017–	Williams	210	0	3
(Monaco) **Charles Leclerc**	2015	33	4	13	4th	2018–	Sauber	192	9	56
(United Kingdom) **George Russell**	2015–2016	63	3	13	**3rd**	2019–	Williams	173	8	32
(Thailand) **Alex Albon**	2015	31	0	5	7th	2019–2020, 2022–	Toro Rosso	147	0	2
(United Kingdom) **Lando Norris**	2016–2017	33	9	20	**1st**	2019–	McLaren	172	14	51
(Canada) Nicholas Latifi	2013–2014	60	0	1	10th	2020–2022	Williams	61	0	0
(Brazil) Pietro Fittipaldi	2015	30	0	0	17th	2020	Haas	2	0	0
(Russia) Nikita Mazepin	2016–2017	59	0	3	10th	2021	Haas	21	0	0
(Germany) Mick Schumacher	2017–2018	60	8	15	**1st**	2021–2022	Haas	43	0	0
(China) Zhou Guanyu	2016–2018	90	2	13	8th	2022–2024	Alfa Romeo	68	0	0

† Competed as a guest driver ineligible to score championship points.

== See also ==
- Formula Three
- Formula 3 Euro Series
- FIA European Formula Three Cup
- FIA Formula 3 International Trophy
