= 1999 Masters of Formula 3 =

Race details
Date	8 August 1999
Official name	Marlboro Masters of Formula 3
Location	Circuit Park Zandvoort, Netherlands
Course	4.3 km (2.7 mi)
Distance	Qualifying Race; 10 laps, 43 km (27 mi); Main Race; 20 laps, 86 km (53 mi)
- Qualifying Race

Pole
Driver	(France) Julien Beltoise	ASM Fina
Time	1:35.810

Fastest Lap
Driver	(France) Sébastien Dumez	ASM Fina
Time	1:36.261 (on lap 3 of 10)

Podium
First	(France) Julien Beltoise	ASM Fina
Second	(France) Sébastien Dumez	ASM Fina
Third	(Argentina) Juan Manuel López	Prema Powerteam
- Main Race

Pole
Driver	(Germany) Thomas Mutsch	Van Amersfoort Racing
Time	1:34.301

Fastest Lap
Driver	(United Kingdom) Marc Hynes	Manor Motorsport
Time	1:35.452 (on lap 4 of 20)

Podium
First	(United Kingdom) Marc Hynes	Manor Motorsport
Second	(Germany) Thomas Mutsch	Van Amersfoort Racing
Third	(South Africa) Etienne van der Linde	Van Amersfoort Racing

The 1999 Marlboro Masters of Formula 3 was the ninth Masters of Formula 3 race held at Circuit Park Zandvoort on 8 August 1999. It was won by Marc Hynes, for Manor Motorsport. This was the first Masters event held on the extended layout, having run on the Club Circuit in its first eight seasons.

== Drivers and teams ==
1999 Entry List
Team	No	Driver	Chassis	Engine	Main series
(France) ASM Fina	1	(France) Julien Beltoise	Dallara F399	Renault	French Formula Three
(France) ASM Fina	2	(France) Sébastien Dumez	Dallara F399	Renault	French Formula Three
(France) ASM Fina	3	(Portugal) Tiago Monteiro	Dallara F399	Renault	French Formula Three
(France) La Filière	4	(France) Sébastien Bourdais	Martini MK79	Opel	French Formula Three
(France) La Filière	5	(France) Yannick Schroeder	Martini MK79	Opel	French Formula Three
(France) La Filière	6	(Japan) Ryo Fukuda	Martini MK79	Opel	French Formula Three
(Switzerland) KMS Benetton Junior Team	7	(Switzerland) Gabriele Gardel	Dallara F399	Opel	German Formula Three
(Switzerland) KMS Benetton Junior Team	8	(Germany) Thomas Jäger	Dallara F399	Opel	German Formula Three
(Germany) Opel Team BSR	9	(Netherlands) Christijan Albers	Dallara F399	Opel	German Formula Three
(Germany) Opel Team BSR	10	(Germany) Sven Heidfeld	Dallara F399	Opel	German Formula Three
(Italy) Prema Powerteam	11	(Sweden) Peter Sundberg	Dallara F399	Opel	Italian Formula Three
(Italy) Prema Powerteam	12	(Argentina) Juan Manuel López	Dallara F399	Opel	Italian Formula Three
(Italy) Prema Powerteam	15	(Italy) Fulvio Cavicchi	Dallara F399	Opel	Italian Formula Three
(Italy) Target Racing	16	(United States) Stanislas d'Oultremont	Dallara F399	Opel	Italian Formula Three
(United Kingdom) Manor Motorsport	17	(United Kingdom) Marc Hynes	Dallara F399	Mugen-Honda	British Formula 3
(United Kingdom) Manor Motorsport	18	(Thailand) Tor Sriachavanon	Dallara F399	Mugen-Honda	British Formula 3
(Italy) RC Benetton Junior Team	19	(Italy) Gianluca Calcagni	Dallara F399	Opel	Italian Formula Three
(Italy) RC Benetton Junior Team	20	(Switzerland) Gabriele Varano	Dallara F399	Opel	Italian Formula Three
(United Kingdom) Promatecme UK	21	(Brazil) Aluizio Coelho	Dallara F399	Renault	British Formula 3
(United Kingdom) Promatecme UK	22	(United Kingdom) Jenson Button	Dallara F399	Renault	British Formula 3
(United Kingdom) Promatecme Junior Team	23	(France) Bruno Besson	Dallara F399	Renault	French Formula Three
(Germany) ADAC Berlin Brandenburg	25	(Germany) Stefan Mücke	Dallara F399	Opel	German Formula Three
(France) Signature Competition	26	(France) Jonathan Cochet	Dallara F399	Renault	French Formula Three
(France) Signature Competition	27	(France) Benoît Tréluyer	Dallara F399	Renault	French Formula Three
(Germany) D2 Team Rosberg & Lohr	28	(Germany) Pierre Kaffer	Dallara F399	Renault	German Formula Three
(Germany) D2 Team Rosberg & Lohr	29	(Netherlands) Wouter van Eeuwijk	Dallara F399	Renault	German Formula Three
(Germany) bemani F3 team	30	(Germany) Timo Scheider	Dallara F399	Opel	German Formula Three
(Germany) bemani F3 team	31	(Switzerland) Marcel Fässler	Dallara F399	Opel	German Formula Three
(United Kingdom) Carlin Motorsport	32	(India) Narain Karthikeyan	Dallara F399	Mugen-Honda	British Formula 3
(United Kingdom) Carlin Motorsport	33	(France) Jérémie Dufour	Dallara F399	Mugen-Honda	FIA European Formula Three Cup
(Netherlands) Van Amersfoort Racing	34	(South Africa) Etienne van der Linde	Dallara F399	Opel	German Formula Three
(Netherlands) Van Amersfoort Racing	35	(Germany) Thomas Mutsch	Dallara F399	Opel	German Formula Three
(Germany) GM-DSF-F3 Team	36	(Austria) Robert Lechner	Dallara F399	Opel	German Formula Three
(Germany) GM-DSF-F3 Team	37	(Netherlands) Jeroen Bleekemolen	Dallara F399	Opel	Formula Palmer Audi
(Italy) Team Ghinzani	38	(Italy) Davide Uboldi	Dallara F399	Fiat	Italian Formula Three
(Italy) Team Ghinzani	39	(Italy) Michele Spoldi	Dallara F399	Mugen-Honda	Italian Formula Three
(Italy) Ravarotto Racing Team	40	(Italy) Enrico Toccacelo	Dallara F399	Fiat	Italian Formula Three
(Italy) Ravarotto Racing Team	41	(Italy) Filippo Zadotti	Dallara F399	Fiat	Italian Formula Three
(United Kingdom) Fortec Motorsport	42	(Denmark) Kristian Kolby	Dallara F399	Mugen-Honda	British Formula 3
(United Kingdom) Fortec Motorsport	43	(United Kingdom) Matthew Davies	Dallara F399	Mugen-Honda	British Formula 3
(United Kingdom) Alan Docking Racing	44	(United Kingdom) Doug Bell	Dallara F399	Mugen-Honda	British Formula 3
(United Kingdom) Alan Docking Racing	45	(Japan) Yudai Igarashi	Dallara F399	Mugen-Honda	British Formula 3
(United Kingdom) Speedsport F3 Racing Team	46	(Republic of Ireland) Warren Carway	Dallara F399	Mugen-Honda	British Formula 3
(United Kingdom) Speedsport F3 Racing Team	47	(South Africa) Toby Scheckter	Dallara F399	Mugen-Honda	British Formula 3
(Belgium) JB Motorsport	48	(Netherlands) Walter van Lent	Dallara F399	Opel	German Formula Three
(Belgium) JB Motorsport	49	(Belgium) Yves Olivier	Dallara F399	Opel	German Formula Three

== Format changes ==
With an entry of 46 cars, race organisers changed the format of qualifying to allow every driver a shot at qualifying for the Marlboro Masters itself. The field would be split into two groups; one for even-numbered cars and one for odd-numbered cars. Then there would be a qualifying session for each group, with the top 14 drivers from each qualifying group automatically entered into the race, with the remaining drivers going into a qualifying race, as seen at the Macau Grand Prix. In the qualifying race, the top six finishers would progress to the Marlboro Masters, although Yudai Igarashi was barred from competing in the main race having been disqualified from the top six in the qualifying race.

== Classification ==
=== Qualifying ===
==== Group A ====
Pos	No	Name	Team	Time	Gap
1	35	(Germany) Thomas Mutsch	Van Amersfoort Racing	1:34.301	
2	17	(United Kingdom) Marc Hynes	Manor Motorsport	1:34.363	+0.062
3	9	(Netherlands) Christijan Albers	Opel Team BSR	1:34.718	+0.417
4	11	(Sweden) Peter Sundberg	Prema Powerteam	1:34.860	+0.559
5	47	(South Africa) Toby Scheckter	Speedsport F3 Racing Team	1:34.867	+0.566
6	21	(Brazil) Aluizio Coelho	Promatecme UK	1:34.969	+0.668
7	31	(Switzerland) Marcel Fässler	bemani F3 team	1:34.990	+0.689
8	39	(Italy) Michele Spoldi	Team Ghinzani	1:35.013	+0.712
9	49	(Belgium) Yves Olivier	JB Motorsport	1:35.060	+0.759
10	23	(France) Bruno Besson	Promatecme Junior Team	1:35.133	+0.832
11	19	(Italy) Gianluca Calcagni	RC Benetton Junior Team	1:35.191	+0.890
12	3	(Portugal) Tiago Monteiro	ASM Fina	1:35.474	+1.173
13	37	(Netherlands) Jeroen Bleekemolen	GM-DSF-F3 Team	1:35.484	+1.183
14	5	(France) Yannick Schroeder	La Filière	1:35.753	+1.452
15	1	(France) Julien Beltoise	ASM Fina	1:35.810	+1.509
16	7	(Switzerland) Gabriele Gardel	KMS Benetton Junior Team	1:35.849	+1.548
17	29	(Netherlands) Wouter van Eeuwijk	D2 Team Rosberg & Lohr	1:35.892	+1.591
18	33	(France) Jérémie Dufour	Carlin Motorsport	1:35.905	+1.604
19	45	(Japan) Yudai Igarashi	Alan Docking Racing	1:35.928	+1.627
20	27	(France) Benoît Tréluyer	Signature Competition	1:36.052	+1.751
21	25	(Germany) Stefan Mücke	ADAC Berlin Brandenburg	1:36.316	+1.852
22	15	(Italy) Fulvio Cavicchi	Prema Powerteam	1:36.379	+2.078
23	41	(Italy) Filippo Zadotti	Ravarotto Racing Team	1:37.397	+3.096
24	43	(United Kingdom) Matthew Davies	Fortec Motorsport	1:39.211	+4.910

==== Group B ====
Pos	No	Name	Team	Time	Gap
1	34	(South Africa) Etienne van der Linde	Van Amersfoort Racing	1:34.464	
2	4	(France) Sébastien Bourdais	La Filière	1:34.639	+0.175
3	48	(Netherlands) Walter van Lent	JB Motorsport	1:34.690	+0.226
4	36	(Austria) Robert Lechner	GM-DSF-F3 Team	1:34.738	+0.274
5	42	(Denmark) Kristian Kolby	Fortec Motorsport	1:34.833	+0.369
6	22	(United Kingdom) Jenson Button	Promatecme UK	1:34.892	+0.428
7	6	(Japan) Ryo Fukuda	La Filière	1:34.926	+0.462
8	32	(India) Narain Karthikeyan	Carlin Motorsport	1:35.071	+0.607
9	8	(Germany) Thomas Jäger	KMS Benetton Junior Team	1:35.396	+0.932
10	30	(Germany) Timo Scheider	bemani F3 team	1:35.410	+0.946
11	10	(Germany) Sven Heidfeld	Opel Team BSR	1:35.515	+1.051
12	20	(Switzerland) Gabriele Varano	RC Benetton Junior Team	1:35.528	+1.064
13	40	(Italy) Enrico Toccacelo	Ravarotto Racing Team	1:35.629	+1.165
14	28	(Germany) Pierre Kaffer	D2 Team Rosberg & Lohr	1:35.807	+1.343
15	26	(France) Jonathan Cochet	Signature Competition	1:35.850	+1.386
16	2	(France) Sébastien Dumez	ASM Fina	1:35.867	+1.403
17	12	(Argentina) Juan Manuel López	Prema Powerteam	1:35.936	+1.472
18	44	(United Kingdom) Doug Bell	Alan Docking Racing	1:36.342	+1.878
19	18	(Thailand) Tor Sriachavanon	Manor Motorsport	1:36.920	+2.456
20	38	(Italy) Davide Uboldi	Team Ghinzani	1:37.356	+2.892
21	16	(United States) Stanislas d'Oultremont	Target Racing	1:38.258	+3.794
22	46	(Republic of Ireland) Warren Carway	Speedsport F3 Racing Team	1:38.838	+4.374

=== Qualification Race ===
- The top five drivers progressed to the main race. As Beltoise won the race, he would line up 29th on the grid, and so forth.

Pos	No	Driver	Team	Laps	Time/Retired	Grid
1	1	(France) Julien Beltoise	ASM Fina	10	17:22.824	1
2	2	(France) Sébastien Dumez	ASM Fina	10	+1.534	4
3	12	(Argentina) Juan Manuel López	Prema Powerteam	10	+2.119	8
4	7	(Switzerland) Gabriele Gardel	KMS Benetton Junior Team	10	+3.067	2
5	43	(United Kingdom) Matthew Davies	Fortec Motorsport	10	+4.401	18
6	33	(France) Jérémie Dufour	Carlin Motorsport	10	+4.935	6
7	44	(United Kingdom) Doug Bell	Alan Docking Racing	10	+6.348	11
8	26	(France) Jonathan Cochet	Signature Competition	10	+6.973	3
9	27	(France) Benoît Tréluyer	Signature Competition	10	+8.597	9
10	16	(United States) Stanislas d'Oultremont	Target Racing	10	+14.909	16
11	38	(Italy) Davide Uboldi	Team Ghinzani	10	+16.099	14
12	25	(Germany) Stefan Mücke	ADAC Berlin Brandenburg	10	+25.096	10
13	15	(Italy) Fulvio Cavicchi	Prema Powerteam	9	+1 Lap	12
Ret	29	(Netherlands) Wouter van Eeuwijk	D2 Team Rosberg & Lohr	7	Retired	5
Ret	41	(Italy) Filippo Zadotti	Ravarotto Racing Team	5	Retired	15
Ret	18	(Thailand) Tor Sriachavanon	Manor Motorsport	0	Retired	13
Ret	46	(Republic of Ireland) Warren Carway	Speedsport F3 Racing Team	0	Retired	17
DSQ	45	(Japan) Yudai Igarashi	Alan Docking Racing	10	+4.041	7
Fastest lap: Sébastien Dumez, 1:36.261, 160.813 km/h (99.925 mph) on lap 3

=== Race ===
Pos	No	Driver	Team	Laps	Time/Retired	Grid
1	17	(United Kingdom) Marc Hynes	Manor Motorsport	20	32:11.979	3
2	35	(Germany) Thomas Mutsch	Van Amersfoort Racing	20	+1.807	1
3	34	(South Africa) Etienne van der Linde	Van Amersfoort Racing	20	+2.440	2
4	9	(Netherlands) Christijan Albers	Opel Team BSR	20	+3.319	5
5	22	(United Kingdom) Jenson Button	Promatecme UK	20	+4.181	12
6	48	(Netherlands) Walter van Lent	JB Motorsport	20	+13.350	6
7	42	(Denmark) Kristian Kolby	Fortec Motorsport	20	+14.389	10
8	39	(Italy) Michele Spoldi	Team Ghinzani	20	+18.363	15
9	47	(South Africa) Toby Scheckter	Speedsport F3 Racing Team	20	+18.732	9
10	4	(France) Sébastien Bourdais	La Filière	20	+20.800	4
11	6	(Japan) Ryo Fukuda	La Filière	20	+24.387	14
12	30	(Germany) Timo Scheider	bemani F3 team	20	+25.778	20
13	32	(India) Narain Karthikeyan	Carlin Motorsport	20	+26.648	16
14	23	(France) Bruno Besson	Promatecme Junior Team	20	+27.275	19
15	43	(United Kingdom) Matthew Davies	Fortec Motorsport	20	+27.854	33
16	28	(Germany) Pierre Kaffer	D2 Team Rosberg & Lohr	20	+34.257	28
17	1	(France) Julien Beltoise	ASM Fina	20	+35.719	29
18	12	(Argentina) Juan Manuel López	Prema Powerteam	20	+36.194	31
19	2	(France) Sébastien Dumez	ASM Fina	20	+36.751	30
20	7	(Switzerland) Gabriele Gardel	KMS Benetton Junior Team	20	+47.138	32
21	37	(Netherlands) Jeroen Bleekemolen	GM-DSF-F3 Team	20	+47.608	25
22	5	(France) Yannick Schroeder	La Filière	20	+48.144	27
23	10	(Germany) Sven Heidfeld	Opel Team BSR	20	+48.813	22
24	31	(Switzerland) Marcel Fässler	bemani F3 team	17	Retired	13
25	20	(Switzerland) Gabriele Varano	RC Benetton Junior Team	16	Retired	24
Ret	40	(Italy) Enrico Toccacelo	Ravarotto Racing Team	14	Retired	26
Ret	11	(Sweden) Peter Sundberg	Prema Powerteam	13	Retired	7
Ret	49	(Belgium) Yves Olivier	JB Motorsport	7	Retired	17
Ret	3	(Portugal) Tiago Monteiro	ASM Fina	7	Retired	23
Ret	21	(Brazil) Aluizio Coelho	Promatecme UK	5	Retired	11
Ret	36	(Austria) Robert Lechner	GM-DSF-F3 Team	3	Retired	8
Ret	8	(Germany) Thomas Jäger	KMS Benetton Junior Team	3	Retired	18
Ret	19	(Italy) Gianluca Calcagni	RC Benetton Junior Team	0	Retired	21
DNS	45	(Japan) Yudai Igarashi	Alan Docking Racing			
DNQ	33	(France) Jérémie Dufour	Carlin Motorsport			
DNQ	44	(United Kingdom) Doug Bell	Alan Docking Racing			
DNQ	26	(France) Jonathan Cochet	Signature Competition			
DNQ	27	(France) Benoît Tréluyer	Signature Competition			
DNQ	16	(United States) Stanislas d'Oultremont	Target Racing			
DNQ	38	(Italy) Davide Uboldi	Team Ghinzani			
DNQ	25	(Germany) Stefan Mücke	ADAC Berlin Brandenburg			
DNQ	15	(Italy) Fulvio Cavicchi	Prema Powerteam			
DNQ	29	(Netherlands) Wouter van Eeuwijk	D2 Team Rosberg & Lohr			
DNQ	41	(Italy) Filippo Zadotti	Ravarotto Racing Team			
DNQ	18	(Thailand) Tor Sriachavanon	Manor Motorsport			
DNQ	46	(Republic of Ireland) Warren Carway	Speedsport F3 Racing Team			
Fastest lap: Marc Hynes, 1:35.452, 162.176 km/h (100.771 mph) on lap 4
