= Scheckter =

Scheckter is a surname. Notable people with the surname include:

- Jody Scheckter (born 1950), South African business proprietor and motor racing driver
- Toby Scheckter (born 1978), South African racing driver
- Tomas Scheckter (born 1980), South African racing driver, son of Jody

== See also ==
- Schecter (disambiguation)
