= 1999 British Formula Three Championship =

1999 British Formula 3 International Series

Seasons
- ← 1998 2000 →

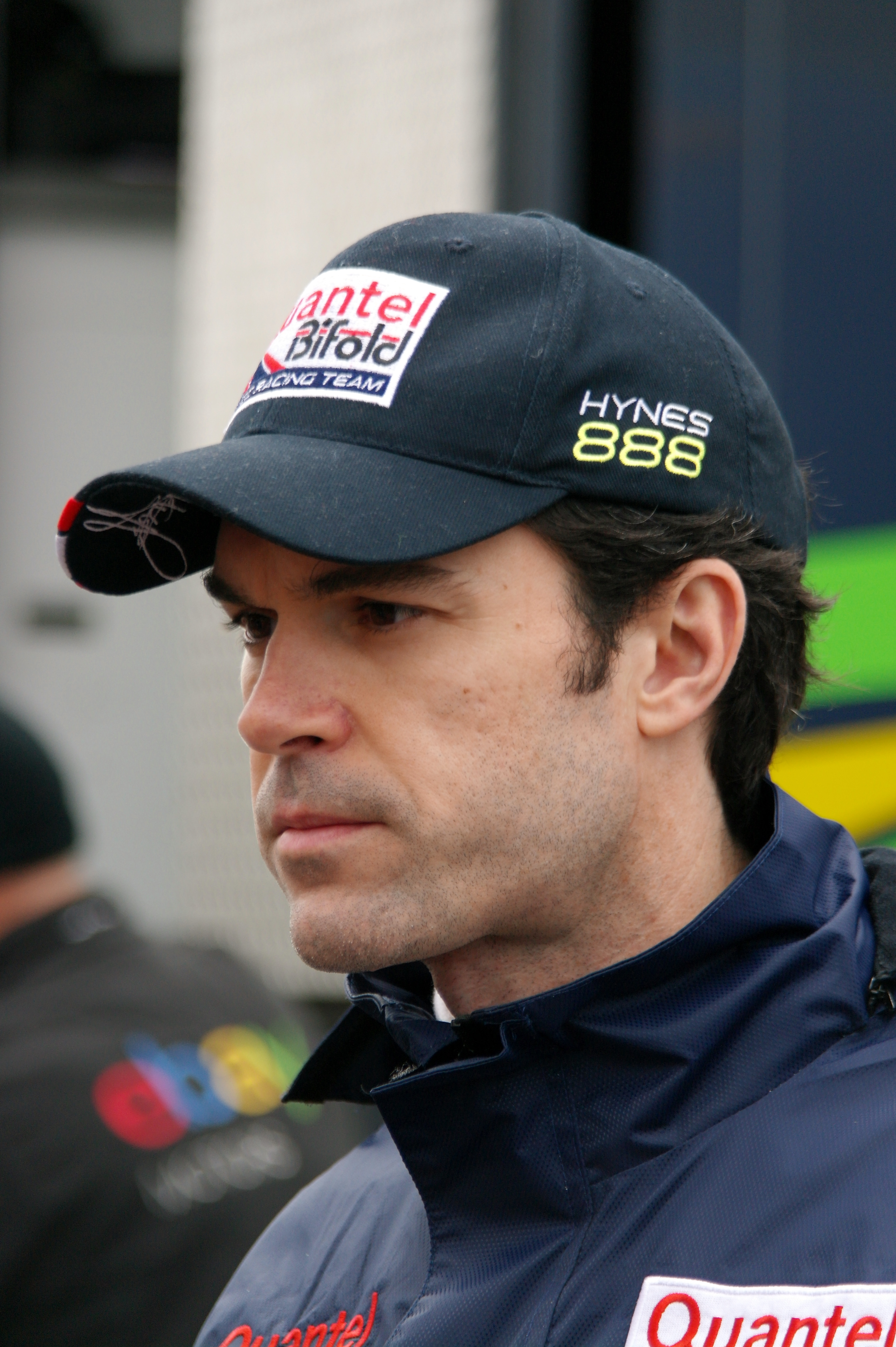
1999 champion, Marc Hynes

The 1999 British Formula Three season was the 49th British Formula Three Championship season. It commenced on 21 March, and ended on 17 October after sixteen races. Marc Hynes was the champion, although the season is best remembered for 19-year-old future F1 champion Jenson Button marking himself out as one to watch. Martin O'Connell took the spoils in Class B.

The scoring system was 20-15-12-10-8-6-4-3-2-1 points awarded to the first ten finishers, with 1 (one) extra point added to the driver who set the fastest lap of the race. All results counted towards the driver's final tally.

== Drivers and teams ==
The following teams and drivers were competitors in the 1999 season. Class B is for older Formula Three cars.

Team	No	Driver	Chassis	Engine	Rounds
Class A
(United Kingdom) Stewart Racing	1	(Brazil) Luciano Burti	Dallara F399	Mugen-Honda	All
(United Kingdom) Stewart Racing	2	(United Kingdom) Andrew Kirkaldy	Dallara F399	Mugen-Honda	All
(United Kingdom) Fortec Motorsport	3	(United Kingdom) Matt Davies	Dallara F399	Mugen-Honda	All
(United Kingdom) Fortec Motorsport	4	(Denmark) Kristian Kolby	Dallara F399	Mugen-Honda	All
(United Kingdom) Promatecme UK	5	(Brazil) Aluizio Coelho	Dallara F399	Renault Sodemo	All
(United Kingdom) Promatecme UK	6	(United Kingdom) Jenson Button	Dallara F399	Renault Sodemo	All
(United Kingdom) Alan Docking Racing	7	(Japan) Yudai Igarashi	Dallara F399	Mugen-Honda	1–15
(United Kingdom) Alan Docking Racing	7	(United Kingdom) Warren Hughes	Dallara F399	Mugen-Honda	16
(United Kingdom) Alan Docking Racing	8	(Malaysia) Alex Yoong	Dallara F399	Mugen-Honda	3–6
(United Kingdom) Alan Docking Racing	8	(United Kingdom) Doug Bell	Dallara F399	Mugen-Honda	7–14
(United Kingdom) SpeedSport F3	9	(South Africa) Toby Scheckter	Dallara F399	Mugen-Honda	All
(United Kingdom) SpeedSport F3	10	(Republic of Ireland) Warren Carway	Dallara F399	Mugen-Honda	All
(United Kingdom) Carlin Motorsport	12	(India) Narain Karthikeyan	Dallara F399	Mugen-Honda	All
(United Kingdom) Carlin Motorsport	14	(United Kingdom) Michael Bentwood	Dallara F399	Mugen-Honda	All
(United Kingdom) S.S. Sport	15	(United Kingdom) Tim Spouge	Dallara F399	Opel Spiess	All
(United Kingdom) S.S. Sport	16	(United Kingdom) Doug Bell	Dallara F399	Opel Spiess	1–3
(United Kingdom) Manor Motorsport	17	(United Kingdom) Marc Hynes	Dallara F399	Mugen-Honda	All
(United Kingdom) Manor Motorsport	18	(Thailand) Tor Sriachavanon	Dallara F399	Mugen-Honda	All
(France) Graff Racing	19	(Malaysia) Alex Yoong	Dallara F399	Mugen-Honda	9
(France) ASM	20	(France) Sebastien Dumez	Dallara F399	Renault Sodemo	14
(France) ASM	21	(Portugal) Tiago Monteiro	Dallara F399	Renault Sodemo	14
(France) ASM	22	(France) Julien Beltoise	Dallara F399	Renault Sodemo	14
(Belgium) JB Motorsports	23	(Netherlands) Walter van Lent	Dallara F399	Opel Spiess	14
(Belgium) JB Motorsports	24	(Belgium) Yves Olivier	Dallara F399	Opel Spiess	14
(Italy) Prema Powerteam	25	(Sweden) Peter Sundberg	Dallara F399	Opel Spiess	14
(Italy) Prema Powerteam	26	(Argentina) Juan Manuel López	Dallara F399	Opel Spiess	14
(Italy) Prema Powerteam	27	(Italy) Giorgio Pantano	Dallara F399	Opel Spiess	14
(Germany) Opel Team BSR	28	(Netherlands) Christijan Albers	Dallara F399	Opel Spiess	14
(Germany) Opel Team BSR	29	(Austria) Patrick Friesacher	Dallara F399	Opel Spiess	14
(Italy) RC Benetton	30	(Italy) Gabriele Varano	Dallara F399	Opel Spiess	14
Class B
(United Kingdom) Rowan Racing	51	(United Kingdom) Martin O'Connell	Dallara F398	TOM'S-Toyota	1–7, 10–16
(United Kingdom) Rowan Racing	51	(United Kingdom) Stephen Shanly	Dallara F398	TOM'S-Toyota	8–9
(United Kingdom) Rowan Racing	52	(United Kingdom) Gavin Jones	TOM'S 037F	TOM'S-Toyota	6, 8–9
(United Kingdom) Rowan Racing	52	(United Kingdom) Charles Hall	Dallara F398	TOM'S-Toyota	13–14
(United Kingdom) Carlin Motorsport	54	(United States) John Bender	Dallara F398	Mugen-Honda	3–5, 8–9, 11–16
(United Kingdom) SpeedSport F3	57	(United Kingdom) John Ingram	Dallara F398	Mugen-Honda	8–9
(United Kingdom) SpeedSport F3	57	(Greece) Nick Eliades	Dallara F398	Mugen-Honda	13–16
(United Kingdom) JSR	75	(United Kingdom) Jeremy Smith	Dallara F398	Opel Spiess	1–8, 10
(United Kingdom) Diamond Racing	77	(Japan) Takuma Sato	Dallara F398	Mugen-Honda	9–12, 14–16

- Entries 20-30 were regular entrants in other European Formula Three Championships, and only competed at the round at Spa-Francorchamps. They were eligible to score points.

=== Driver changes ===
Changed Teams

- Michael Bentwood: Speedsport → Carlin Motorsport
- Warren Carway: Rowan Racing → SpeedSport F3
- Marc Hynes: Promatecme UK → Manor Motorsport
- Tiago Monteiro: Signature Team → ASM Fina
- Peter Sundberg Venturini Racing → Prema Powerteam

Entering/Re-Entering British Formula 3

- Julien Beltoise: Championnat de France Formule Renault & Formula Renault Europe (Mygale) → Fortec Motorsport
- John Bender: British Formula Renault Winter Championship (Manor Motorsport) → Carlin Motorsport
- Jenson Button: British Formula Ford Championship (Haywood Racing) → Promatecme UK
- Doug Bell: British Formula Renault Championship & Formula Renault Europe (Manor Motorsport) → S.S. Sport
- Aluizio Coelho: British Formula Renault Championship (Manor Motorsport) → Promatecme UK
- Matthew Davies: Championnat de France Formule Renault & Formula Renault Europe (Mygale) → ASM Fina
- Nick Eliades: Debut → SpeedSport F3
- Patrick Friesacher: Formula Renault Campus France → Opel Team BSR
- Charles Hall: Sabbatical → Rowan Racing
- Gavin Jones: British Formula Renault Championship (Haywood/Eiger) → Rowan Racing
- Andrew Kirkaldy: Formula Opel Europe → Paul Stewart Racing
- Walter van Lent: Formula Ford Zetec Benelux → JB Motorsport
- Juan Manuel López: Sabbatical → Prema Powerteam
- Yves Olivier: German Formula Three Championship (JB Motorsport) → JB Motorsport
- Giorgio Pantano: Karting → Target Racing
- Toby Scheckter: Formula Opel Europe → SpeedSport F3
- Takuma Sato: All-Japan Formula Three Championship (Dome Project) → Diamond Racing
- Stephen Shanly: Debut → Rowan Racing
- Jeremy Smith: Debut → Jeremy Smith Racing
- Tor Sriachavanon: British Formula Renault Championship (Manor Motorsport) → Manor Motorsport
- Gabriele Varano: Sabbatical → RC Motorsport

Leaving British Formula 3

- Enrique Bernoldi: Promatecme UK → International Formula 3000 (Red Bull Junior/RSM Marko)
- Mark Boost: Speedsport → British Formula Renault Championship (Haywood)
- Sébastien Bourdais: La Filière → French Formula Three Championship (La Filière)
- Ben Collins: Intersport Racing → Indy Lights (Johansson Motorsports)
- David Cook: DC Cook Motorsport → Retirement
- Paula Cook: DC Cook Motorsport → British Touring Car Championship (DC Cook Motorsport)
- Marcel Fässler: La Filière → German Formula Three Championship (Bemani F3 Team)
- Gabriele Gardel: Team Ghinzani → German Formula Three Championship (KMS Benetton Junior Team)
- Mario Haberfeld: Paul Stewart Racing → International Formula 3000 (West Competition)
- Steve Hayr: Tarry Falcon Racing → Retirement
- Warren Hughes: Portman Arrows Racing → MGF Cup
- Mike Kirkham: Speedsport → Retirement
- Darren Manning: Speedsport → All-Japan Formula Three Championship (TOM'S)
- Ricardo Mauricio: Alan Docking Racing → International Formula 3000 (Super Nova Racing)
- Lei Kit Meng: Carlin Motorsport → Sabbatical
- Andrej Pavicevic: Fortec Motorsport → International Formula 3000 (Fortec Motorsport)
- Mikael Santavirta: Alan Docking Racing → Sabbatical
- Philip Scifleet: Rowan Racing → Sabbatical
- Topi Serjala: Portman Arrows Racing → Formula Palmer Audi
- Jamie Spence: Martin Donnelly Racing → Euro Open MoviStar by Nissan (Glückmann Racing)
- Benoît Tréluyer: Signature → French Formula Three Championship (Signature)
- Stephen White: Tarry Falcon Racing → Sabbatical
- Adam Wilcox: TOM'S → Formula Palmer Audi

== Results ==
Round	Circuit	Date	Pole position	Fastest lap	Winning driver	Winning team	Class B winner
1	(United Kingdom) Donington Park	21 March	(United Kingdom) Jenson Button	(United Kingdom) Marc Hynes	(United Kingdom) Marc Hynes	(United Kingdom) Manor Motorsport	(United Kingdom) Jeremy Smith
2	(United Kingdom) Silverstone	28 March	(Denmark) Kristian Kolby	(Denmark) Kristian Kolby	(United Kingdom) Marc Hynes	(United Kingdom) Manor Motorsport	(United Kingdom) Martin O'Connell
3	(United Kingdom) Thruxton	11 April	(United Kingdom) Andrew Kirkaldy	(Brazil) Luciano Burti	(United Kingdom) Jenson Button	(United Kingdom) Promatecme UK	(United Kingdom) Martin O'Connell
4	(United Kingdom) Brands Hatch	25 April	(India) Narain Karthikeyan	(India) Narain Karthikeyan	(Brazil) Luciano Burti	(United Kingdom) Stewart Racing	(United Kingdom) Martin O'Connell
5	(United Kingdom) Brands Hatch	25 April	(India) Narain Karthikeyan	(India) Narain Karthikeyan	(India) Narain Karthikeyan	(United Kingdom) Carlin Motorsport	(United Kingdom) Martin O'Connell
6	(United Kingdom) Oulton Park	3 May	(Brazil) Luciano Burti	(Brazil) Luciano Burti	(Brazil) Luciano Burti	(United Kingdom) Stewart Racing	(United Kingdom) Martin O'Connell
7	(United Kingdom) Croft	6 June	(United Kingdom) Marc Hynes	(Brazil) Luciano Burti	(United Kingdom) Marc Hynes	(United Kingdom) Manor Motorsport	(United Kingdom) Martin O'Connell
8	(United Kingdom) Brands Hatch	20 June	(Brazil) Luciano Burti	(India) Narain Karthikeyan	(India) Narain Karthikeyan	(United Kingdom) Carlin Motorsport	(United States) John Bender
9*	(United Kingdom) Silverstone	10 July	(United Kingdom) Marc Hynes	(United Kingdom) Jenson Button	(United Kingdom) Marc Hynes	(United Kingdom) Manor Motorsport	(Japan) Takuma Sato
10	(United Kingdom) Snetterton	25 July	(Brazil) Luciano Burti	(Brazil) Luciano Burti	(Brazil) Luciano Burti	(United Kingdom) Stewart Racing	(United Kingdom) Martin O'Connell
11	(United Kingdom) Pembrey	15 August	(Denmark) Kristian Kolby	(United Kingdom) Jenson Button	(Denmark) Kristian Kolby	(United Kingdom) Fortec Motorsport	(United Kingdom) Martin O'Connell
12	(United Kingdom) Pembrey	15 August	(United Kingdom) Jenson Button	(United Kingdom) Jenson Button	(United Kingdom) Jenson Button	(United Kingdom) Promatecme UK	(United Kingdom) Martin O'Connell
13	(United Kingdom) Donington Park	5 September	(United Kingdom) Marc Hynes	(United Kingdom) Marc Hynes	(United Kingdom) Marc Hynes	(United Kingdom) Manor Motorsport	(United States) John Bender
14	(Belgium) Spa-Francorchamps	26 September	(United Kingdom) Jenson Button	(Netherlands) Christijan Albers	(Brazil) Luciano Burti	(United Kingdom) Stewart Racing	(Japan) Takuma Sato
15	(United Kingdom) Silverstone	10 October	(Brazil) Luciano Burti	(United Kingdom) Jenson Button	(United Kingdom) Jenson Button	(United Kingdom) Promatecme UK	(Japan) Takuma Sato
16	(United Kingdom) Thruxton	17 October	(Brazil) Luciano Burti	(Denmark) Kristian Kolby	(Brazil) Luciano Burti	(United Kingdom) Stewart Racing	(United Kingdom) Martin O'Connell

- Round 9 was held as part of the British Grand Prix weekend, and was thus held on a Saturday

== Standings ==
Pos	Driver	DON (United Kingdom)	SIL (United Kingdom)	THR (United Kingdom)	BRH (United Kingdom)	BRH (United Kingdom)	OUL (United Kingdom)	CRO (United Kingdom)	BRH (United Kingdom)	SIL (United Kingdom)	SNE (United Kingdom)	PEM (United Kingdom)	PEM (United Kingdom)	DON (United Kingdom)	SPA (Belgium)	SIL (United Kingdom)	THR (United Kingdom)	Pts
Class A
1	(United Kingdom) Marc Hynes	1	1	3	3	6	10	1	4	1	2	6	4	1	2	3	4	213
2	(Brazil) Luciano Burti	3	3	Ret	1	3	1	2	2	3	1	3	8	3	1	DSQ	1	209
3	(United Kingdom) Jenson Button	2	6	1	8	7	5	Ret	6	2	11	2	1	2	4	1	Ret	168
4	(Denmark) Kristian Kolby	5	2	4	7	13	2	12	7	4	4	1	3	6	3	5	2	153
5	(United Kingdom) Matt Davies	Ret	5	5	Ret	4	3	14	5	6	3	5	2	8	Ret	2	6	113
6	(India) Narain Karthikeyan	4	Ret	Ret	2	1	13	3	1	5	7	12	7	Ret	12	6	Ret	104
7	(United Kingdom) Andrew Kirkaldy	9	7	2	Ret	16	4	11	3	12	Ret	8	11	5	9	7	Ret	64
8	(United Kingdom) Michael Bentwood	7	Ret	8	6	8	8	7	10	9	Ret	4	5	9	13	15	Ret	50
9	(Brazil) Aluizio Coelho	8	Ret	9	11	10	7	5	8	NS	Ret	13	Ret	13	5	4	9	45
10	(United Kingdom) Tim Spouge	10	Ret	10	13	11	9	4	Ret	8	8	11	6	7	11	Ret	5	42
11	(Malaysia) Alex Yoong			6	5	2	6			11								37
12	(South Africa) Toby Scheckter	Ret	10	11	9	12	14	Ret	12	7	Ret	10	12	4	10	NS	7	27
13	(United Kingdom) Doug Bell	6	8	Ret				9	11	10	6	Ret	Ret	10	14			22
14	(Thailand) Tor Sriachavanon	Ret	Ret	Ret	12	Ret	18	6	9	14	Ret	7	9	Ret	Ret	12	12	16
15	(Japan) Yudai Igarashi	11	9	NS	10	9	12	8	Ret	13	Ret	NS	NS	Ret	20	10		14
16	(United Kingdom) Warren Hughes																3	12
17	(Republic of Ireland) Warren Carway	12	11	13	Ret	Ret	15	Ret	Ret	15	9	Ret	13	11	Ret	11	13	6
18	(Belgium) Yves Olivier														6			6
19	(Portugal) Tiago Monteiro														7			4
20	(France) Julien Beltoise														8			3
21	(Netherlands) Christijan Albers														25			1
22	(Italy) Giorgio Pantano														15			0
23	(Netherlands) Walter van Lent														16			0
24	(Argentina) Juan Manuel López														17			0
25	(Austria) Patrick Friesacher														21			0
26	(Sweden) Peter Sundberg														23			0
27	(Italy) Gabriele Varano														24			0
	(France) Sebastien Dumez														Ret			0
Class B
1	(United Kingdom) Martin O'Connell	Ret	4	7	4	5	11	10			5	9	10	Ret	19	9	8	241
2	(United States) John Bender			Ret	14	14			13	18		15	14	12	Ret	13	10	140
3	(United Kingdom) Jeremy Smith	13	12	12	15	15	17	13	16		NS							111
4	(Japan) Takuma Sato									16	10	14	Ret		18	8	11	103
5	(United Kingdom) Gavin Jones						16		14	17								45
6	(Greece) Nick Eliades													14	Ret	14	14	35
7	(United Kingdom) Stephen Shanly								15	19								22
8	(United Kingdom) Charles Hall													Ret	22			12
9	(United Kingdom) John Ingram								Ret	20								8
Pos	Driver	DON (United Kingdom)	SIL (United Kingdom)	THR (United Kingdom)	BRH (United Kingdom)	BRH (United Kingdom)	OUL (United Kingdom)	CRO (United Kingdom)	BRH (United Kingdom)	SIL (United Kingdom)	SNE (United Kingdom)	PEM (United Kingdom)	PEM (United Kingdom)	DON (United Kingdom)	SPA (Belgium)	SIL (United Kingdom)	THR (United Kingdom)	Pts

- Points System: 20-15-12-10-8-6-4-3-2-1 for first 10 finishers, with 1 point awarded for fastest lap.
