= Juan Manuel López (racing driver) =

Argentinian racing driver (born 1980)

- Nationality: (Argentina) Argentine
- Born: March 9, 1980 (age 46) Buenos Aires, Argentina
- Categorisation: FIA Gold

Previous series
- 2009–2012 2007–2010 2001–2010 2002–2009 2004 1997–2001 1999–2000 1998 1997 1997 1995–1996: International GT Open; Spanish GT; TC2000; TRV6; Turismo Nacional; South American ST; British F3; Formula Super Renault Argentina; Formula Vauxhall Winter Series; South American F3; Argentine FR

Juan Manuel López, also known as Cochito Lopez (born March 9, 1980) is an Argentinian racing driver. He competed in the TC2000 series between 2001 and 2003 (in addition to doing some further events in 2007 and 2010); he also finished eleventh in both the 2005 and the 2006 Top Race V6 championships.

López continued his career in Europe in 2007, where he competed in the Spanish GT Championship in 2007, 2009 and 2010; and the International GT Open, which he competed in from 2009 until 2012. He won the Super GT category of the Spanish GT Championship in both 2007 and 2010, finished fifth in the 2011 International GT Open Super GT class, and fifth in the same series in 2012.

== Career ==
=== Early career ===
López, born in Buenos Aires, Argentina, started his racing career in 1995 in the Argentine Formula Renault Championship. In 1997, he switched to the Campeonato Sudamericano de Formula 3, where he scored eight points and finished 16th overall; he also competed in two rounds of the South American Super Touring Car Championship, driving a Race Car-entered Alfa Romeo 155 TS, and scoring seven points to finish 18th overall, in addition to competing in the Formula Vauxhall Winter Series for Team Meritus, where he finished fourth. For 1998, he switched to the Formula Super Renault Argentina with Ruben Rullo, competing in the full season, and taking three podiums and a pole position; his 66 points were enough for sixth overall.

1999 saw López switch to the Italian Formula Three Championship, driving for Prema Powerteam, where he took a win and five further podiums on the way to finishing sixth in the championship, with 140 points. In addition to the Italian F3, he also drove for Prema Powerteam in three other events; the Spa-Francorchamps round of the British Formula 3 Championship (finishing 17th), the European Formula 3 Cup (where he finished seventh) and the Masters of Formula 3, where he finished 18th. He entered six rounds of the British F3 in 2000, taking six points for Manor Motorsport, whilst Manor Motorsport also entered him in the European Formula 3 Cup, where he finished tenth.

=== 2001-2004 ===
In 2001, López returned to Argentina, and joined the TC 2000 Championship, driving an Alfa Romeo 146 entered by CL Racing; his father, Osvaldo, was also driving for the team. He competed in ten races, but only scored four points, resulting in him finishing 26th overall. In addition to the TC2000, he also entered the only round of the South American Super Touring Car Championship, taking both the victory and the fastest lap in an Alfa Romeo 156 TS, entered by Quadrifoglio Corse. 2002 saw him remain in the TC 2000 with CL Racing along with his father, and this time the younger López took 18th in the championship, with 13 points, having entered ten events. He also entered the Top Race V6, taking a pole position.

2003 saw López switch to JM Competicion, who were also entering an Alfa Romeo 146 in the TC2000. Despite entering twelve races, the move proved unsuccessful; he slipped to 28th in the championship, taking just two points all season. In 2004, he switched from the TC2000 to the Turismo Nacional Argentina, entering a Clase 3 Ford Escort in five races; his 24 points saw him finish 36th in the class.

=== 2005-2008 ===
In 2005, López returned to the Top Race V6 series, driving for River Plate Motorsports in a Ford Mondeo. He finished eleventh, with 65 points; and finished eleventh again the follow season, although this time he scored 92 points. In 2007, López competed in every race of both the Top Race V6 series and the Spanish GT Championship, partnering Manuel Gião in a Ferrari F430 GT2 entered by GPC Sport. Although he slipped to 18th in the Top Race V6 series, with 49 points, he won the Super GT category of the Spanish GT Championship, with he and Gião edging out Francisco Cruz Martins by two points; López took seven class victories, and four further podiums, on his way to the title. In addition to competing in these two series, he entered a single round of the TC2000, driving for Sportteam Competicion in a Volkswagen Bora; he finished 18th, having started 28th. For 2008, he entered six races of the Top Race V6 series with Crespi Competición; however, he only scored a single point, and finished 51st in the championship.

=== 2009-2012 ===
In 2009, López returned to the Spanish GT Championship, signing with Aurora Racing Team to partner Peter Sundberg in the #1 Ferrari F430 GT2. The first round of the season, held at Valencia, saw the team take a third and a fifth-place finish. The team were renamed to "Exakt Racing" for the next event at Jarama, and won the first race of the event. Two further wins followed, plus a second place. The season finale, held at Algarve, was a shared event between the Spanish GT Championship and the International GT Open; the team were the fastest Spanish GT Championship in the first race, and finished fifth overall, and finished tenth overall in the second race, third of all the Spanish GT entries. López finished the Spanish GT season classified third in the Super GT category, with 77 points. He also competed in the Master de Pilotos de la República Argentina karting event, taking sixth, as well as entering an invitational Top Race V6 event, where he finished 15th in a Ford Mondeo.

López remained in the Spanish GT Championship with Aurora Racing Team in 2010, once more being partnered by Manuel Gião. This time, the opening round of the season, held at Valencia, was also the opening round of the International GT Open; the team finished eighth overall in race one (third of the Spanish GT entries), before finishing third overall in race two, and fastest of all the Spanish GT entries. Following this event, he and Giăo finished all bar one event in the top four overall – a tenth-place finish at Estoril being the only exception; and this equated to a third in class - taking six outright wins in the nine races. He finished the season second overall, with 194 points, and took the Super GT class title, with 98 points in the class. In addition to this, he also entered a single event of the TC2000, driving for the works Fiat team; he finished 32nd overall, having started from eleventh, and the 2010 edition of the Master de Pilotos de la República Argentina, finishing 14th.

2011 saw a full-time switch to the International GT Open, with López joining Vittoria Competizioni, and partnering Marco Frezza in a Ferrari F430 GT2. The pair won the first race of the season, held at Imola, and went on to win three more races that season, at Magny-Cours, Spa-Francorchamps, and in the final race of the season at Barcelona, where López was partnered by Alessandro Pier Guidi. López finished fifth in both the overall standings and the Super GT category's standings.

In 2012, López remained in the International GT Open, but joined Scuderia Villorba Corse, who were entering a Ferrari 458 GT2; he was partnered by Andrea Montermini. The season started inauspiciously, with Algarve only yielding a 26th and an eighth-place finish overall, and the first race at the Nürburgring a retirement; however, the team then took their only overall win of the season in the second race at the Nürburgring. The team took six further podiums, two of which were second places, during the season; and finished the season with an eleventh in the second race at Barcelona. López finished fifth in both the overall driver's championship, and the Super GT category.
