= Kristian Kolby =

Danish racing driver (born 1978)

Kristian Kolby (born 9 October 1978) is a Danish racing driver from Ringkøbing in Denmark.

== Career ==
Kolby was based in the United Kingdom, but raced all over the world, for many years and was a successful single seater racer, Sportscar and touring car racer. Prior to this, he was a successful karting champion in both his native Denmark and in the UK.

Kolby is a former British Formula Ford champion for the Van Diemen team beating team mate Mark Webber to the title. He went on to become a race winner in the UK Formula Renault series again with Van Diemen, UK Formula Three series, finishing fourth in the British championship in 1999. In 2000, he progressed to the F3000 series with the DAMS team partnering Franck Montagny taking a best finish of fourth at the Nurburgring in a difficult season for both the DAMS drivers. Kolby also undertook media and testing work for the BAR F1 team occasionally, but ultimately never raced.

Kolby moved to Conquest Racing in the American Indy Lights series in 2001, competing against his childhood friend Daniel Wheldon. His win in Indy Lights at Kansas is one of the world's closest motor race finishes as he narrowly beat Irishman Damien Faulkner by 0.001secs.

Before finishing in single-seater racing, Kolby also competed in the Le Mans 24-hour race for the DAMS (Driot-Arnoux Motorsport) Cadillac team, as well as races for the Ascari team, notably the Sebring 12hrs. He also competed in touring car races in the Danish Touring Car Challenge during the 2000 season dovetailing his F3000 year.

Kolby retired from racing in 2003 at a young age. He carried on doing media and TV presenting work in his native work, before concentrating on a business career in the UK.

== Racing record ==
=== Complete International Formula 3000 results ===
(key) (Races in bold indicate pole position; races in italics indicate fastest lap.)

Year	Entrant	1	2	3	4	5	6	7	8	9	10	11	12	DC	Points
2000	DAMS	IMO; 11	SIL; 12	CAT; Ret	NUR; DNQ	MON; DNQ	MAG; DNQ	A1R; DNQ	HOC; 5	HUN; 20	SPA; 15			23rd	2
2002	European Minardi F3000	INT	IMO	CAT	A1R	MON	NUR	SIL	MAG	HOC	HUN; 12	SPA; 10	MNZ; 11	NC	0

=== American open–wheel racing results ===
(key)

==== Indy Lights ====
Year	Team	1	2	3	4	5	6	7	8	9	10	11	12	Rank	Points	Ref
2001	Conquest Racing	MTY; 6	LBH; 5	TXS; 3	MIL; 6	POR; 8	KAN; 1	TOR; 10	MOH; 4	GAT	ATL	LAG	FON	**8th**	**80**	

=== 24 Hours of Le Mans results ===
Year	Team	Co-Drivers	Car	Class	Laps	Pos.	Class Pos.
2000	(France) Team DAMS	(Belgium) Marc Goossens (France) Christophe Tinseau	Cadillac Northstar LMP	LMP900	4	DNF	DNF

Sporting positions
Preceded by Bas Leinders	British Formula Ford Champion; 1996	Succeeded by Jacky van der Ende
