= Aluizio Coelho =

Brazilian racing driver

Aluizio Coelho (born August 21, 1974 in Rio de Janeiro, Brazil) is a racing driver. He was British Formula Renault champion during the 1998 British Formula Renault season, and progressed into British Formula 3 in 1999 with the Promatecme UK team with future Formula One champion Jenson Button as his teammate. He competed in all rounds, finishing ninth in the championship on 45 points, but that was only just over a quarter of Button's impressive tally of 168. Since then, he has returned to his native Brazil, competing in the SudAm F3 and GT3 Brazil with limited success.

Sporting positions
Preceded by Marc Hynes	British Formula Renault; UK series champion 1998	Succeeded by Antônio Pizzonia
