= Marc Hynes =

British racing driver (born 1978)

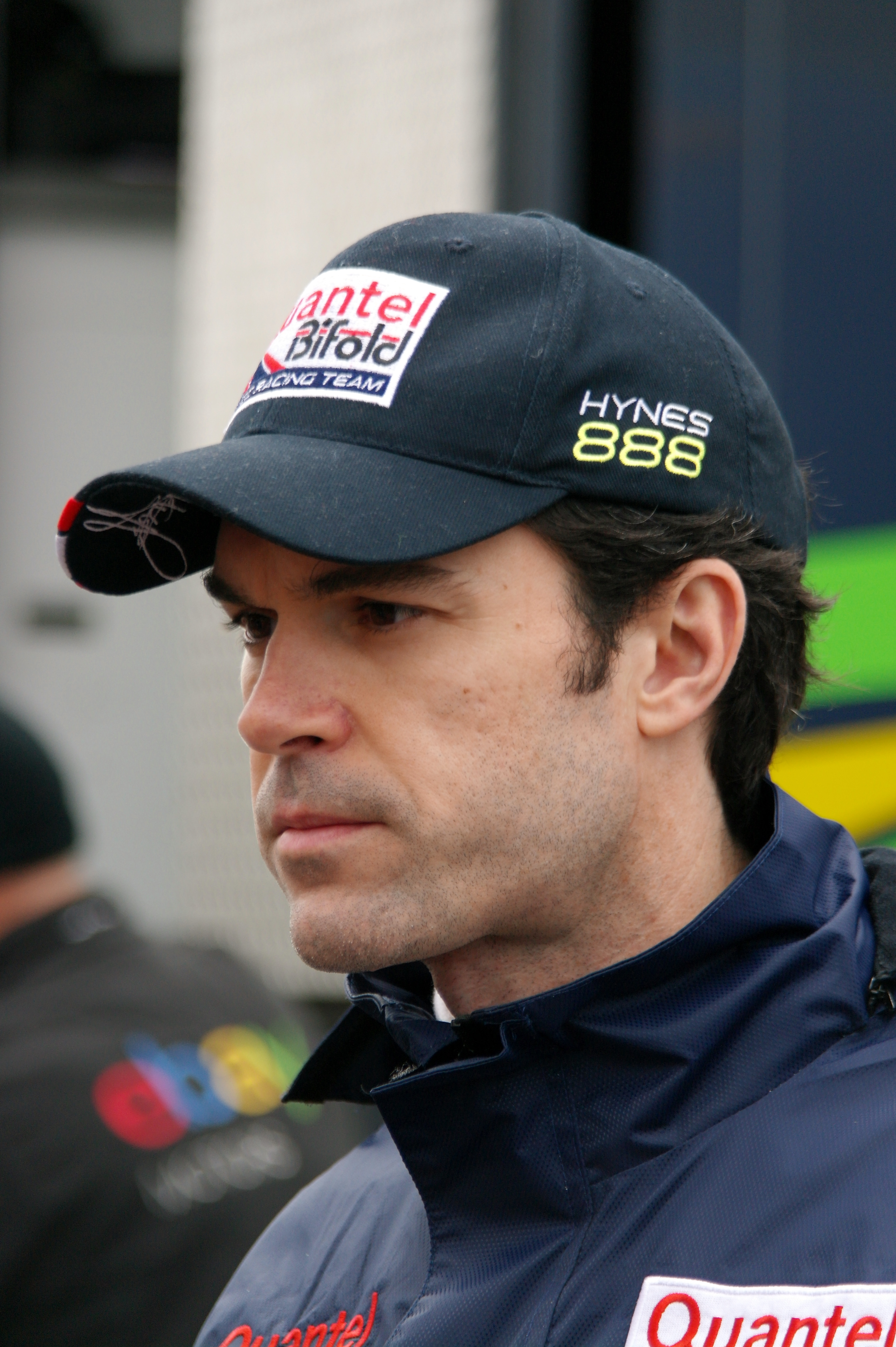
- Hynes at the Donington round of the 2014 British Touring Car Championship.
- Nationality: (United Kingdom) British
- Born: Marc William Hynes; 26 February 1978 (age 48) Guildford, England

British Touring Car Championship career
- Debut season: 2014
- Current team: Quantel Bifold Racing
- Car number: 888
- Starts: 30
- Wins: 0
- Poles: 0
- Fastest laps: 0
- Best finish: 18th in 2014

Previous series
- 2008 2007 2005 2000, 2003 2000 1998–99 1997 1996 1995: V8 Supercars; Porsche Supercup; American Le Mans Series; International Formula 3000; German Formula Three Championship; British Formula 3 Championship; British Formula Renault Championship; Formula Vauxhall; Formula Vauxhall Junior

Championship titles
- 1999 1997 1995: British Formula 3 Championship; Formula 3 Masters; British Formula Renault Championship; Formula Vauxhall Junior

Marc William Hynes (born 26 February 1978 in Guildford) is a British racing driver who works as chief racing officer for the Cadillac F1 Team. He competed with Triple Eight Race Engineering in the British Touring Car Championship in 2014.

== Biography ==
Hynes won the 1995 British Formula Vauxhall Junior title and the 1997 British Formula Renault title.

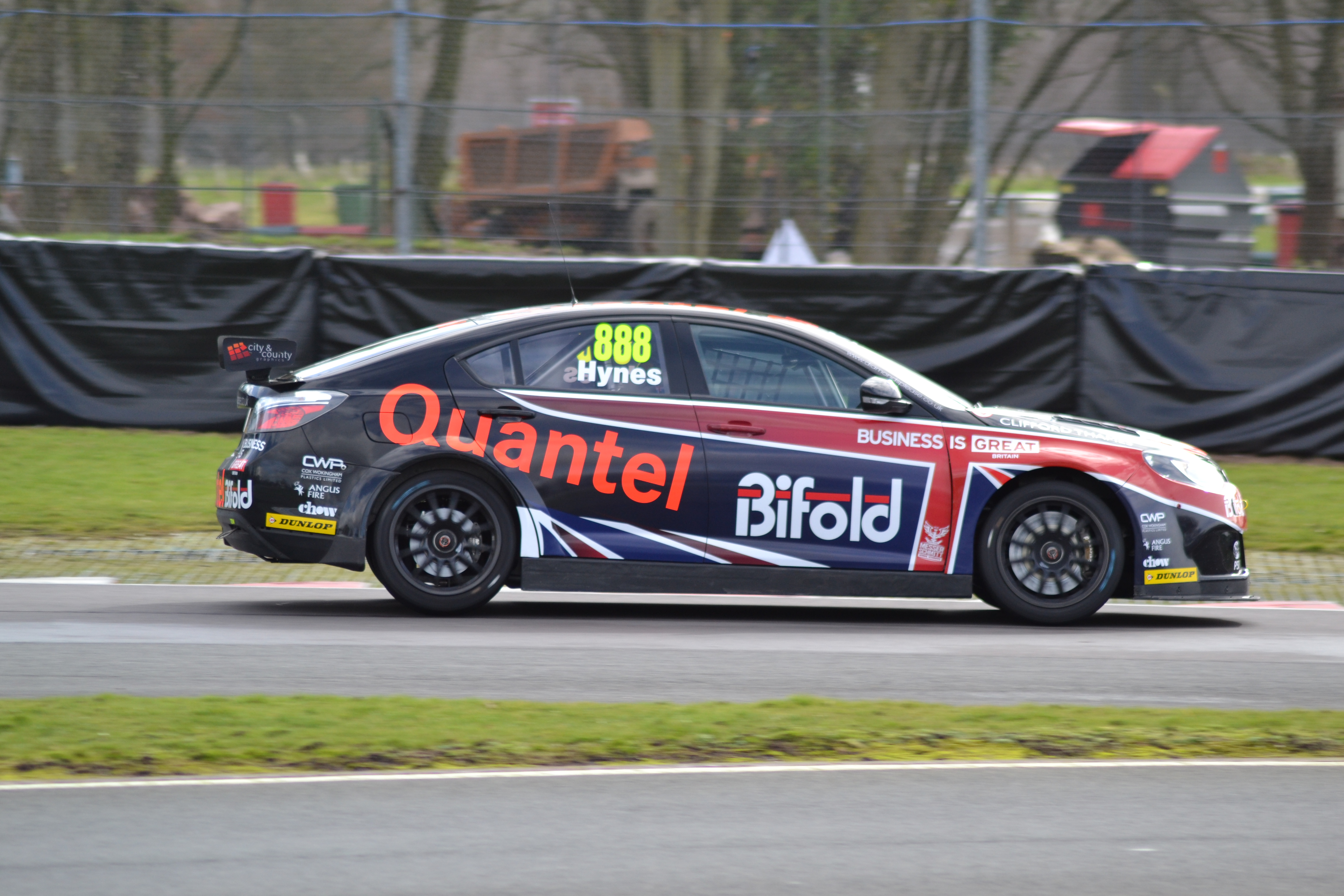
Hynes driving the Triple Eight Race Engineering MG 6 at Oulton Park during the 2014 British Touring Car Championship.

Hynes then stepped up to Formula 3 and won the 1999 British Formula 3 Championship for Manor Motorsport beating Luciano Burti and Jenson Button into second and third places respectively. He competed in three rounds of the 2000 International Formula 3000 season for the WRT team. He has also tested for the Formula One team British American Racing.

Hynes has also worked as a driver coach for his former team Manor Motorsport. He is also the former Head of Driver Development at Marussia F1, the Formula One team born out of Manor Motorsport.

From 2016 to 2021, Hynes worked with Lewis Hamilton, helping run Project 44, the company which manages Hamilton's business affairs. Hynes and Hamilton became friends during their junior racing careers and parted amicably to allow Hynes to focus on other business activities.

In 2026, Hynes works as a chief racing officer in the Cadillac F1 Team.

== Racing record ==
=== Complete International Formula 3000 results ===
(key) (Races in bold indicate pole position; races in italics indicate fastest lap.)

Year	Entrant	1	2	3	4	5	6	7	8	9	10	DC	Points
2000	WRT	IMO	SIL	CAT	NUR; DNQ	MON; Ret	MAG; Ret	A1R	HOC	HUN	SPA	NC	0
2003	BCN F3000	IMO	CAT	A1R	MON	NUR	MAG	SIL; 14	HOC	HUN	MNZ	28th	0

=== Complete Porsche Supercup results ===
(key) (Races in bold indicate pole position) (Races in italics indicate fastest lap)

Year	Team	1	2	3	4	5	6	7	8	9	10	11	DC	Points	Ref
2007	Team IRWIN SAS	BHR; 14	BHR; Ret	ESP; 18	MON; 21	FRA; 6	GBR; 16	GER; 16	HUN; 11	TUR; 12	ITA; 10	BEL; 12	11th	48	

=== Bathurst 1000 results ===
Year	Team	Car	Co-driver	Position	Laps
2008	Triple Eight Race Engineering	Ford Falcon BF	(Italy) Fabrizio Giovanardi	15th	159

=== Complete British Touring Car Championship results ===
(key) Races in bold indicate pole position (1 point awarded – just in first race) Races in italics indicate fastest lap (1 point awarded) * signifies that driver lead race for at least one lap (1 point awarded)

Year	Team	Car	1	2	3	4	5	6	7	8	9	10	11	12	13	14	15	16	17	18	19	20	21	22	23	24	25	26	27	28	29	30	DC	Pts
2014	Quantel Bifold Racing	MG 6 GT	BRH; 1 Ret	BRH; 2 DSQ	BRH; 3; 18	DON; 1; 11	DON; 2; 23	DON; 3 Ret	THR; 1; 16	THR; 2; 13	THR; 3; 15	OUL; 1; 10	OUL; 2; 14	OUL; 3; 13	CRO; 1; 16	CRO; 2; 15	CRO; 3 Ret	SNE; 1; 18	SNE; 2; 10	SNE; 3; 9	KNO; 1; 16	KNO; 2; 23	KNO; 3; 15	ROC; 1; 22	ROC; 2; 16	ROC; 3 Ret	SIL; 1; 8	SIL; 2; 12	SIL; 3; 16	BRH; 1; 12	BRH; 2; 20	BRH; 3; 10	18th	54

^{*} Season still in progress.

Sporting positions
Preceded by David Cook	Formula Renault UK; Champion; 1997	Succeeded by Aluizio Coelho
Preceded by Mario Haberfeld	British Formula 3 Championship; Champion; 1999	Succeeded by Antônio Pizzonia
Preceded by David Saelens	Masters of Formula 3 Winner; 1999	Succeeded by Jonathan Cochet
