= 1999 German Formula Three Championship =

Seasons
- ← 1998 2000 →

The 1999 German Formula Three Championship (German: 1999 Deutsche Formel-3-Meisterschaft) was a multi-event motor racing championship for single-seat open wheel formula racing cars that held across Europe. The championship featured drivers competing in two-litre Formula Three racing cars built by Dallara and Martini which conform to the technical regulations, or formula, for the championship. It commenced on 9 May at Sachsenring and ended at Nürburgring on 17 October after nine double-header rounds.

Opel Team BSR driver Christijan Albers was the season champion. He clinched the title winning six of 18 races. Marcel Fässler finished as runner-up with wins at Sachsenring, Oschersleben, and Hockenheim, losing 45 points to Albers. Thomas Jäger was victorious at Zweibrücken, Oschersleben and finished third. The other race winners was Robert Lechner, Yves Olivier and Timo Scheider, who completed the top six in the drivers' championship.

The scoring system consisted of 20-15-12-10-8-6-4-3-2-1 points awarded to the top ten finishers in the race, with three extra points for the driver who took pole position.

The second race at the Nürburgring on August 22, 1999, was stopped after only nine completed laps, so half points were awarded.

== Teams and drivers ==
1999 Entry list
Team	No.	Driver	Chassis	Engine	Status	Rounds
(Netherlands) Van Amersfoort Racing	1	(Germany) Thomas Mutsch	Dallara F399/004	Opel		All
(Netherlands) Van Amersfoort Racing	2	(South Africa) Etienne van der Linde	Dallara F399/058	Opel	R	1-5
(Netherlands) Van Amersfoort Racing	2	(Netherlands) Jacky van der Ende	Dallara F399/058	Opel	R	6-10
(Germany) GM-DSF-F3 Team	3	(Austria) Robert Lechner	Dallara F399/042	Opel		All
(Germany) GM-DSF-F3 Team	4	(Austria) Herbert Jerich	Dallara F399/073	Opel	R	1-5
(Germany) GM-DSF-F3 Team	4	(Germany) Norman Simon	Dallara F399/073	Opel		6
(Germany) GM-DSF-F3 Team	4	(Germany) Tony Schmidt	Dallara F399/073	Opel	R	9-10
(Germany) GM-DSF-F3 Team	5	(Netherlands) Elran Nijenhuis	Dallara F399/005	Opel	R	All
(Germany) Josef Kaufmann Racing	6	(Germany) Timo Rumpfkeil	Martini MK79/05	Opel		1-5
(Germany) Josef Kaufmann Racing	7	(Netherlands) Hugo van der Ham	Martini MK79/01	Opel	R	1
(Germany) Opel Team BSR	8	(Austria) Martin Rihs	Dallara F397/049	Opel		1, 5-7
(Germany) Opel Team BSR	9	(Netherlands) Christijan Albers	Dallara F399/021	Opel		All
(Germany) Opel Team BSR	10	(Germany) Sven Heidfeld	Dallara F399/023	Opel	R	All
(Switzerland) KMS Benetton Junior Team	11	(Germany) Thomas Jäger	Dallara F399/020	Opel		All
(Switzerland) KMS Benetton Junior Team	12	(Switzerland) Gabriele Gardel	Dallara F399/001	Opel		All
(Germany) MKL F3 Racing	14	(Germany) Tom Schwister	Dallara F398/023	Opel		1-4
(Belgium) JB Motorsport	15	(Belgium) Yves Olivier	Dallara F399/003	Opel		All
(Belgium) JB Motorsport	16	(Netherlands) Walter van Lent	Dallara F399/041	Opel	R	All
(Germany) Klaus Trella Motorsport	17	(Republic of Ireland) Ken Grandon	Dallara F399/009	Opel	R	2-10
(Czech Republic) TKF Racing	19	(Germany) Andreas Feichtner	Dallara F398/009	Opel	R	1-9
(Germany) D2 Team Rosberg & Lohr	21	(Netherlands) Wouter van Eeuwijk	Dallara F399/060	Renault		1-5
(Germany) D2 Team Rosberg & Lohr	21	(Finland) Kari Mäenpää	Dallara F399/060	Renault	R	All
(Germany) D2 Team Rosberg & Lohr	22	(Germany) Pierre Kaffer	Dallara F399/065	Renault		All
(Germany) bemani F3-team	23	(Switzerland) Marcel Fässler	Dallara F399/054	Opel		All
(Germany) bemani F3-team	24	(Germany) Timo Scheider	Dallara F399/068	Opel		All
(Germany) MCH F3 Team	25	(Germany) Roland Rehfeld	Dallara F397/023	Opel	R	All
(Germany) MCH F3 Team	26	(Germany) Patrick Hildenbrandt	Dallara F398/001	Opel	R	1-4
(Germany) ADAC Berlin-Brandenburg	27	(Germany) Stefan Mücke	Dallara F399/007	Opel	R	All

== Calendar ==
With the exception of round at Salzuburg in Austria, all rounds took place on German soil.

Round		Location	Circuit	Date	Supporting
1	R1	Saxony, Germany	Sachsenring	8 May	ADAC Sparkassenpreis Sachsenring
1	R2	Saxony, Germany	Sachsenring	9 May	ADAC Sparkassenpreis Sachsenring
2	R1	Zweibrücken, Germany	Zweibrücken	22 May	ADAC Preis Zweibrücken
2	R2	Zweibrücken, Germany	Zweibrücken	23 May	ADAC Preis Zweibrücken
3	R1	Oschersleben, Germany	Motorsport Arena Oschersleben	19 June	ADAC-Preis der Tourenwagen von "Sachsen-Anhalt"
3	R2	Oschersleben, Germany	Motorsport Arena Oschersleben	20 June	ADAC-Preis der Tourenwagen von "Sachsen-Anhalt"
4	R1	Nuremberg, Germany	Norisring	3 July	Norisring Speedweekend "Nürnberg 200"
4	R2	Nuremberg, Germany	Norisring	4 July	Norisring Speedweekend "Nürnberg 200"
5	R1	Nürburg, Germany	Nürburgring	21 August	ADAC Großer Preis der Tourenwagen
5	R2	Nürburg, Germany	Nürburgring	22 August	ADAC Großer Preis der Tourenwagen
6	R1	Salzburg, Austria	Salzburgring	4 September	ADAC-Alpentrophäe
6	R2	Salzburg, Austria	Salzburgring	5 September	ADAC-Alpentrophäe
7	R1	Oschersleben, Germany	Motorsport Arena Oschersleben	18 September	ADAC-Preis von Niedersachsen
7	R2	Oschersleben, Germany	Motorsport Arena Oschersleben	19 September	ADAC-Preis von Niedersachsen
8	R1	Hockenheim, Germany	Hockenheimring	2 October	ADAC-Preis Hockenheim
8	R2	Hockenheim, Germany	Hockenheimring	3 October	ADAC-Preis Hockenheim
9	R1	Nürburg, Germany	Nürburgring	16 October	26. ADAC Bilstein Supersprint
9	R2	Nürburg, Germany	Nürburgring	17 October	26. ADAC Bilstein Supersprint

== Results ==
Round		Circuit	Pole position	Fastest lap	Winning driver	Winning team
1	R1	Sachsenring	(Germany) Pierre Kaffer	(Germany) Timo Scheider	(Switzerland) Marcel Fässler	(Germany) bemani F3-team
1	R2	Sachsenring	(Germany) Pierre Kaffer	(Germany) Timo Scheider	(Germany) Timo Scheider	(Germany) bemani F3-team
2	R1	Zweibrücken	(Austria) Robert Lechner	(Germany) Thomas Jäger	(Germany) Thomas Jäger	(Switzerland) KMS Benetton Junior Team
2	R2	Zweibrücken	(Belgium) Yves Olivier	(Austria) Robert Lechner	(Germany) Thomas Jäger	(Switzerland) KMS Benetton Junior Team
3	R1	Motorsport Arena Oschersleben	(Germany) Thomas Jäger	(Netherlands) Christijan Albers	(Netherlands) Christijan Albers	(Germany) Opel Team BSR
3	R2	Motorsport Arena Oschersleben	(Austria) Patrick Friesacher	(Switzerland) Marcel Fässler	(Switzerland) Marcel Fässler	(Germany) bemani F3-team
4	R1	Norisring	(Belgium) Yves Olivier	(Germany) Thomas Mutsch	(Netherlands) Christijan Albers	(Germany) Opel Team BSR
4	R2	Norisring	(Austria) Robert Lechner	(Germany) Thomas Mutsch	(Austria) Robert Lechner	(Germany) GM-DSF-F3 Team
5	R1	Nürburgring	(Netherlands) Christijan Albers	(Netherlands) Christijan Albers	(Netherlands) Christijan Albers	(Germany) Opel Team BSR
5	R2	Nürburgring	(Netherlands) Christijan Albers	(Germany) Thomas Jäger	(Netherlands) Christijan Albers	(Germany) Opel Team BSR
6	R1	Salzburgring	(Netherlands) Christijan Albers	(Germany) Thomas Jäger	(Netherlands) Christijan Albers	(Germany) Opel Team BSR
6	R2	Salzburgring	(Belgium) Yves Olivier	(Netherlands) Christijan Albers	(Belgium) Yves Olivier	(Belgium) JB Motorsport
7	R1	Motorsport Arena Oschersleben	(Netherlands) Christijan Albers	(Netherlands) Christijan Albers	(Switzerland) Marcel Fässler	(Germany) bemani F3-team
7	R2	Motorsport Arena Oschersleben	(Germany) Thomas Jäger	(Germany) Pierre Kaffer	(Germany) Thomas Jäger	(Switzerland) KMS Benetton Junior Team
8	R1	Hockenheimring	(Netherlands) Christijan Albers	(Netherlands) Christijan Albers	(Netherlands) Christijan Albers	(Germany) Opel Team BSR
8	R2	Hockenheimring	(Netherlands) Christijan Albers	(Germany) Thomas Mutsch	(Switzerland) Marcel Fässler	(Germany) bemani F3-team
9	R1	Nürburgring	(Austria) Robert Lechner	(Netherlands) Christijan Albers	(Austria) Robert Lechner	(Germany) GM-DSF-F3 Team
9	R2	Nürburgring	(Germany) Thomas Mutsch	(Netherlands) Christijan Albers	(Austria) Robert Lechner	(Germany) GM-DSF-F3 Team

== Championship standings ==
=== Championship ===
Pos	Driver	SAC		ZWE		OSC1		NOR		NÜR1		SAL		OSC2		HOC		NÜR2		Points
1	(Netherlands) Christijan Albers	Ret	7	7	3	1	3	1	2	1	1	1	7	3	EX	1	5	2	2	229
2	(Switzerland) Marcel Fässler	1	2	Ret	18	3	1	6	5	2	3	15	3	1	3	4	1	5	15	184
3	(Germany) Thomas Jäger	3	4	1	1	2	2	3	Ret	3	14	5	15	8	1	3	7	4	14	179
4	(Austria) Robert Lechner	Ret	5	Ret	10	6	5	16	1	2	2	3	2	6	14	2	6	1	1	163.5
5	(Belgium) Yves Olivier	6	13	Ret	5	5	7	3	2	7	5	2	1	2	4	8	3	9	4	159
6	(Germany) Timo Scheider	2	1	2	2	9	8	DSQ	Ret	Ret	4	10	Ret	16	5	7	Ret	Ret	3	100
7	(Germany) Thomas Mutsch	Ret	6	3	8	5	Ret	4	4	Ret	7	8	Ret	5	6	5	17	3	8	97
8	(Germany) Pierre Kaffer	17	3	4	12	Ret	Ret	7	7	9	8	11	5	7	2	9	8	Ret	7	71.5
9	(Germany) Stefan Mücke	4	10	10	17	12	10	5	15	15	13	4	13	10	9	13	2	6	5	63
10	(Netherlands) Walter van Lent	12	9	8	4	7	4	Ret	10	6	6	Ret	4	11	8	11	4	Ret	Ret	62
11	(Germany) Sven Heidfeld	Ret	17	11	6	Ret	9	8	13	8	10	Ret	8	4	EX	14	16	7	11	31.5
12	(South Africa) Etienne van der Linde	10	14	6	15	18	6	Ret	7	5	Ret									25
13	(Netherlands) Jacky van der Ende											14	6	Ret	7	6	11	Ret	6	22
14	(Switzerland) Gabriele Gardel	7	8	17	13	8	12	11	DSQ	11	16	6	12	9	12	16	13	8	Ret	21
15	(Germany) Andreas Feichtner	14	11	5	Ret	11	17	9	9	Ret	12	12	9	15	13	Ret	10			15
16	(Austria) Herbert Jerich	9	12	9	7	DNS	DNS	17	6	DNS	DNS									14
17	(Germany) Timo Rumpfkeil	5	15	Ret	9	13	Ret	Ret	Ret	16	DNS									10
18	(Republic of Ireland) Ken Grandon			15	11	17	Ret	10	8	14	9	Ret	10	13	10	17	9	11	10	10
19	(Germany) Roland Rehfeld	8	20	Ret	16	16	16	Ret	14	10	11	7	Ret	12	11	Ret	14	14	13	8
20	(Netherlands) Elran Nijenhuis	Ret	19	16	14	10	13	12	12	12	18	9	14	14	Ret	10	Ret	10	12	5
21	(Finland) Kari Mäenpää															15	12	13	9	2
22	(Netherlands) Wouter van Eeuwijk	16	16	13	19	Ret	11	13	11	13	17									0
23	(Germany) Tom Schwister	11	18	12	Ret	15	14	14	Ret											0
24	(Austria) Martin Rihs	Ret	Ret							Ret	15	13	11	Ret	15					0
25	(Germany) Tony Schmidt															12	15	12	16	0
26	(Netherlands) Hugo van der Ham	13	Ret																	0
27	(Germany) Patrick Hildenbrandt	15	Ret	14	Ret	14	15	15	Ret											0
	(Germany) Norman Simon											Ret	Ret							0
Pos	Driver	SAC		ZWE		OSC1		NOR		NÜR1		SAL		OSC2		HOC		NÜR2		Points

=== Junior-Pokal (Rookie) standings ===
	Driver	Points
1	(Netherlands) Walter van Lent	179
2	(Germany) Stefan Mücke	160.5
3	(South Africa) Etienne van der Linde	105
4	(Germany) Sven Heidfeld	103
5	(Netherlands) Jacky van der Ende	97
6	(Republic of Ireland) Ken Grandon	62
7	(Netherlands) Elran Nijenhuis	57
8	(Austria) Herbert Jerich	51
9	(Germany) Andreas Feichtner	50
10	(Germany) Roland Rehfeld	29.5
11	(Finland) Kari Mäenpää	12
12	(Germany) Tony Schmidt	9
13	(Germany) Patrick Hildenbrandt	5
14	(Netherlands) Hugo van der Ham	2
