= Schecter =

Schecter may refer to:

- Solomon Schechter, rabbi, Biblical scholar
- Schecter Guitar Research, an American guitar manufacturer
- Schechter Poultry Corp. v. United States, a landmark Supreme Court decision regarding the Commerce Clause
- Jenny Schecter, a main character from the television show The L Word
