= Manor Motorsport =

British motor racing company

(United Kingdom) Manor Motorsport
- Founded: 1990
- Team principal(s): John Booth (Team Principal); Graeme Lowdon (President & Sporting Director)
- Former series: Formula One; FIA World Endurance Championship; GP3 Series; Formula 3 Euro Series; Eurocup Formula Renault 2.0; Formula Renault 2.0 UK; Formula Renault 2.0 UK Winter Series; Formula Renault 2.0 Northern European Cup; British F3; Auto GP
- Drivers' Championships: Formula Renault UK: 1999: Antônio Pizzonia; 2000: Kimi Räikkönen; 2003: Lewis Hamilton; 2005: Oliver Jarvis; Formula Renault UK Winter Series: 1999: Kimi Räikkönen; 2006: Franck Mailleux; British F3: 1999: Marc Hynes; 2000: Antônio Pizzonia
- Website: manorwec.com

Manor Motorsport Ltd, currently trading as Manor Endurance Racing Ltd is a British motor racing company that was formed in 1990 by former single-seater champion John Booth. Manor has participated as a team in many motorsport disciplines since its inception, including Formula One.

Its current sole involvement in motor racing is an entry to compete in the FIA World Endurance Championship since 2016.

The Formula One team most recently known as Manor Racing cut its links with Manor Motorsport following John Booth and his partner Graeme Lowdon's resignation from the Formula One project at the end of the 2015 season.

== Historical overview ==
Throughout its history, the team primarily competed in Formula Renault, with past drivers including 2007 Formula One World Champion Kimi Räikkönen, 7 times Formula One World Champion Lewis Hamilton and other Formula One drivers such as Antônio Pizzonia. In 1994 James Matthews set a record 11 race wins in a season that lasted more than 20 years, on his way to winning both the British and European series for Manor.

They entered Formula Three in 1999, winning successive British titles with Marc Hynes and Pizzonia.

For some time, the Booth family had been feeling that their Formula Renault UK team was an unnecessary diversion for Manor Motorsport: they needed to concentrate solely on the Formula 3 Euro Series campaign.

So in 2007, Tony Shaw, the manager of their Formula Renault UK team, was given the option to buy the 2-litre single seater operation.

(If you don't believe me, Mary Booth told me that at their base at North Anston, Rotherham, in the Summer of 2006).

Grasping the opportunity, Shaw and his motorsport engineer wife, eagerly became joint-owners of the multiple-championship winning Formula Renault UK team, and set up a completely new operation under the 'Manor Competition' name. Ultimately, they merged with the Dutch team, MP Motorsport, in 2012.

John Booth was now able to concentrated solely on the Manor Motorsport Formula 3 team, running drivers in the Formula 3 Euro Series until the end of 2009.

Manor also had a GP3 Series team from 2010 until 2014, run under the name of "Marussia Manor Racing" with the exception of the 2010 season.

On 5 February 2016, Manor Motorsport announced its entry into the 2016 FIA World Endurance Championship.

=== Partnership with MP Motorsport ===
From 2012 until 2015, Manor Competition competed in the Formula Renault 2.0 Northern European Cup and Eurocup Formula Renault 2.0 championships in partnership with MP Motorsport. As well as this, the two teams combined forces in Auto GP in 2012 and 2013.

== World Endurance Championship ==
For its participation in the 2016 FIA World Endurance Championship, Manor are using two Oreca 05 chassis powered by Nissan engines, racing in the LMP2 class. The No. 44 car – driven by Tor Graves, James Jakes and Will Stevens – was entered for the full season. The No. 45 car was entered on a one-off basis for every race except for Le Mans, as the car was entered too late to gain entry. Richard Bradley, Roberto Merhi and Matt Rao were signed to drive the car.

== Formula One ==
=== Virgin Racing (2010–11) ===
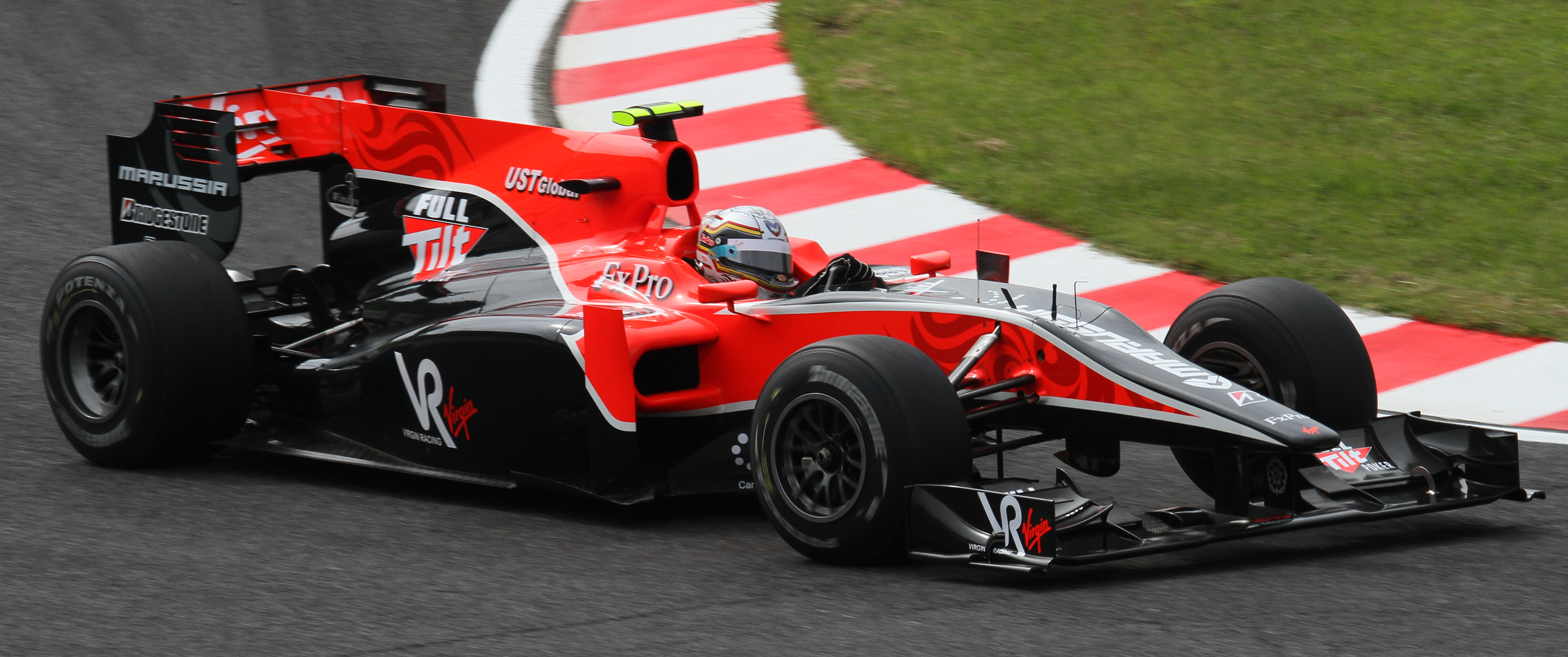
Jérôme d'Ambrosio driving the Virgin VR-01 during the first free practice session at the 2010 Japanese Grand Prix.

On 12 June 2009, it was announced Manor's application to participate in the 2010 Formula One season had been accepted. Their Formula One team was registered as Manor Grand Prix although it raced as Virgin Racing for sponsorship reasons. Powered by Cosworth engine, the team distinguished itself for designing its cars only digitally. This design approach was abandoned in 2011 when the team forged a technical partnership with McLaren.

=== Marussia F1/Manor Marussia (2012–15) ===
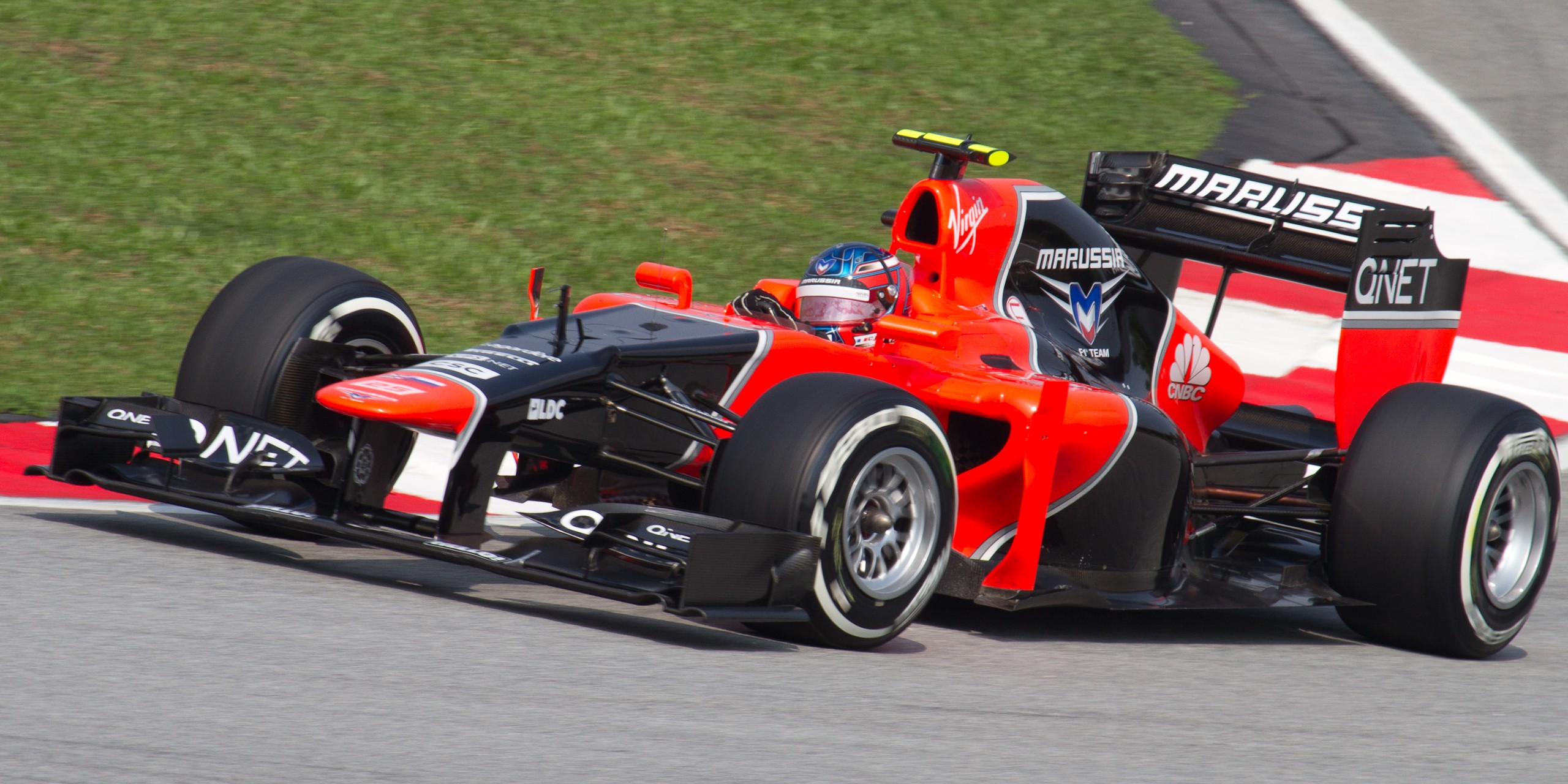
Charles Pic driving the Marussia MR01 during qualifying for the 2012 Malaysian Grand Prix.

The Formula One team was renamed the Marussia F1 Team after Marussia Motors bought a controlling interest in the team. In 2014, coinciding with the team's switch of engine supplier from Cosworth to Ferrari, the team scored its first ever World Championship points thanks to the exploits of their leading Ferrari-sponsored driver, Jules Bianchi, during the Monaco Grand Prix. The team suffered a major blow at the Japanese Grand Prix, when Bianchi was involved in a serious crash and remained in a coma before succumbing to his head injuries in July 2015. At the following race, the inaugural Russian Grand Prix, Marussia fielded only one car out of respect for Bianchi but also as a result of mounting financial pressure, which then saw the team enter administration alongside its rival, Caterham. Marussia would take no further part in the 2014 season. It risked losing its 2014 prize money unless able to further compete in the sport the following year.

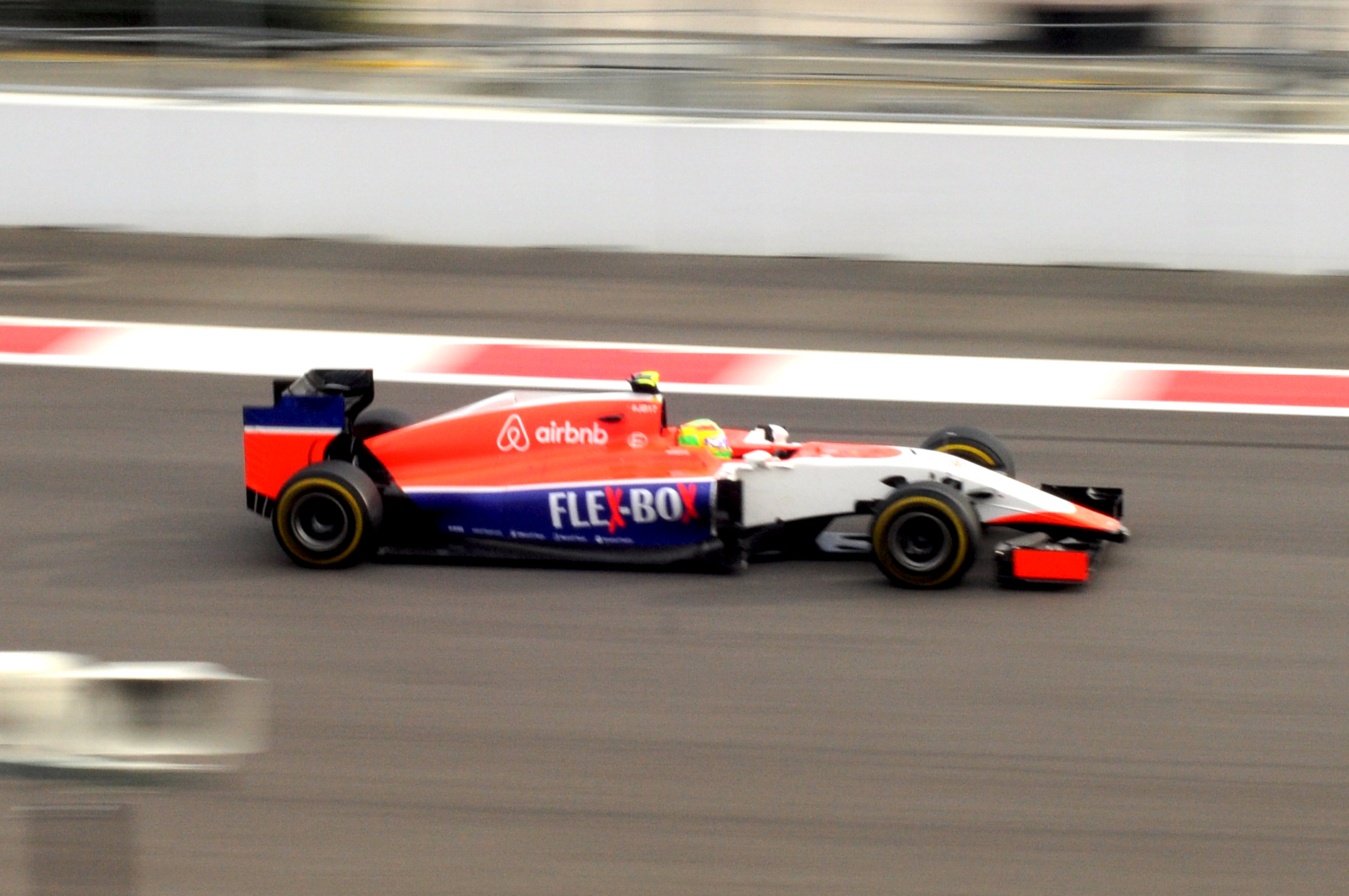
Roberto Merhi driving the Marussia MR03B at the 2015 Russian Grand Prix.

On 19 February 2015, Manor Motorsport's administrators announced that the team had come out of administration and planned to enter the 2015 Formula One season under the name Manor Marussia F1 Team with John Booth and Graeme Lowdon continuing to run the team. This was possible thanks to businessman Stephen Fitzpatrick buying the team, with Justin King joining as chairman.

Booth and Lowdon left the Formula One team at the end of the 2015 season. The team continued to race for one more season, under the name of Manor Racing, albeit independently of Manor Motorsport.

== Driver accidents ==
Two of the Manor team's drivers have sustained fatal head injuries. In July 2012, test driver María de Villota crashed heavily into a team transporter during straight line aerodynamic tests. Among other things, she suffered the loss of her right eye but recovered sufficiently to become a motorsport safety advocate and get married. In October 2013, however, she died following a heart attack believed to have been caused by her underlying brain injuries.

In October 2014, race driver Jules Bianchi suffered severe brain injuries while competing in the Japanese Grand Prix. He succumbed to his injuries in July 2015 after remaining hospitalised and in a coma since the accident. Bianchi had made a significant contribution to the team as recognised by team principal, John Booth who, immediately following the 2015 Australian Grand Prix, attributed the team's 2015 return after failing to complete the prior season to the point-scoring and prize-winning performance of Bianchi at the 2014 Monaco Grand Prix. In Bianchi's honour, from the 2014 Russian Grand Prix until the end of their F1 participation, the team cars carried a "JB17" logo, which represent Bianchi's initials and race number.

== Results ==
=== Formula One ===
| Year | Name | Car | Engine | Tyres | No. | Drivers | Points | WCC |
Virgin
| 2010 | (United Kingdom) Virgin Racing | VR-01 | Cosworth CA2010 2.4 V8 | B | 24. 25. | (Germany) Timo Glock (Brazil) Lucas di Grassi | 0 | 12th |
| 2011 | (Russia) Marussia Virgin Racing | MVR-02 | Cosworth CA2011 2.4 V8 | P | 24. 25. | (Germany) Timo Glock (Belgium) Jérôme d'Ambrosio | 0 | 12th |
Marussia
| 2012 | (Russia) Marussia F1 Team | MR01 | Cosworth CA2012 2.4 V8 | P | 24. 25. | (Germany) Timo Glock (France) Charles Pic | 0 | 11th |
| 2013 | (Russia) Marussia F1 Team | MR02 | Cosworth CA2013 2.4 V8 | P | 22. 23. | (France) Jules Bianchi (United Kingdom) Max Chilton | 0 | 10th |
| 2014 | (Russia) Marussia F1 Team | MR03 | Ferrari 059/3 1.6 V6 t | P | 4. 17. 42. | (United Kingdom) Max Chilton (France) Jules Bianchi (United States) Alexander Rossi | 2 | 9th |
| 2015 | (United Kingdom) Manor Marussia F1 Team | MR03B | Ferrari 059/3 1.6 V6 t | P | 28. 53. 98. | (United Kingdom) Will Stevens (United States) Alexander Rossi (Spain) Roberto Merhi | 0 | 10th |
Manor Racing
| 2016 | (United Kingdom) Manor Racing MRT | MRT05 | Mercedes PU106C Hybrid 1.6 V6 t | P | 94. 88. 31. | (Germany) Pascal Wehrlein (Indonesia) Rio Haryanto (France) Esteban Ocon | 1 | 11th |

=== F3 Euroseries ===
Formula 3 Euro Series results
| Year | Car | Drivers | Races | Wins | Poles | F.Laps | Points | D.C. | T.C. |
|---|---|---|---|---|---|---|---|---|---|
| 2004 | Dallara F304-Mercedes HWA | (Netherlands) Charles Zwolsman Jr. | 20 | 0 | 0 | 0 | 9 | 16th | 5th |
| 2004 | Dallara F304-Mercedes HWA | (United Kingdom) Lewis Hamilton | 20 | 1 | 1 | 0 | 68 | 5th | 5th |
| 2005 | Dallara F305-Mercedes-HWA | (Brazil) Lucas di Grassi | 20 | 1 | 1 | 0 | 68 | **3rd** | 4th |
| 2005 | Dallara F305-Mercedes-HWA | (United Kingdom) Paul di Resta | 20 | 0 | 0 | 0 | 32 | 10th | 4th |
| 2006 | Dallara F305-Mercedes | (Japan) Kohei Hirate | 20 | 1 | 0 | 0 | 61 | **3rd** | **2nd** |
| 2006 | Dallara F305-Mercedes | (Argentina) Esteban Guerrieri | 20 | 2 | 2 | 0 | 58 | 4th | **2nd** |
| 2006 | Dallara F305-Mercedes | (Japan) Kazuki Nakajima | 20 | 1 | 0 | 0 | 36 | 7th | **2nd** |
| 2007 | Dallara F305-Mercedes | (France) Franck Mailleux | 20 | 1 | 0 | 4 | 38 | 7th | **2nd** |
| 2007 | Dallara F305-Mercedes | (United Kingdom) James Jakes | 20 | 1 | 0 | 0 | 42 | 5th | **2nd** |
| 2007 | Dallara F305-Mercedes | (Switzerland) Cyndie Allemann | 20 | 0 | 0 | 0 | 0 | N/A | **2nd** |
| 2007 | Dallara F305-Mercedes | (Netherlands) Yelmer Buurman | 20 | 0 | 0 | 0 | 40 | 6th | **2nd** |
| 2008 | Dallara F308-Mercedes | (Japan) Koudai Tsukakoshi | 20 | 0 | 0 | 0 | 36 | 7th | 5th |
| 2008 | Dallara F308-Mercedes | (United Kingdom) Sam Bird | 20 | 0 | 0 | 0 | 23 | 11th | 5th |
| 2008 | Dallara F308-Mercedes | (Republic of Ireland) Niall Breen | 16 | 0 | 0 | 0 | 8 | 16th | 5th |
| 2008 | Dallara F308-Mercedes | (Japan) Kazuya Oshima | 20 | 1 | 0 | 0 | 7 | 19th | 5th |
| 2009 | Dallara F308-Mercedes | (Brazil) César Ramos | 16 | 0 | 0 | 0 | 0 | 25th | 4th |
| 2009 | Dallara F308-Mercedes | (Brazil) Pedro Nunes | 20 | 0 | 0 | 0 | 0 | 27th | 4th |
| 2009 | Dallara F308-Mercedes | (Spain) Roberto Merhi | 20 | 0 | 0 | 0 | 42 | 7th | 4th |

=== GP3 Series ===
| Year | Car | Entrant | Drivers | Races | Wins | Poles | Fast laps | Points | D.C. | T.C. |
|---|---|---|---|---|---|---|---|---|---|---|
| 2010 | Dallara GP3/10-Renault | (United Kingdom) Manor Racing | (United Kingdom) James Jakes | 12 | 0 | 0 | 0 | 21 | 8th | 4th |
| 2010 | Dallara GP3/10-Renault | (United Kingdom) Manor Racing | (France) Adrien Tambay | 4 | 1 | 0 | 0 | 6 | 20th | 4th |
| 2010 | Dallara GP3/10-Renault | (United Kingdom) Manor Racing | (Indonesia) Rio Haryanto | 16 | 1 | 0 | 0 | 27 | 5th | 4th |
| 2010 | Dallara GP3/10-Renault | (United Kingdom) Manor Racing | (United Kingdom) Adrian Quaife-Hobbs | 16 | 0 | 0 | 0 | 10 | 15th | 4th |
| 2011 | Dallara GP3/10-Renault | (United Kingdom) Marussia Manor Racing | (United Kingdom) Adrian Quaife-Hobbs | 16 | 1 | 2 | 2 | 36 | 5th | **3rd** |
| 2011 | Dallara GP3/10-Renault | (United Kingdom) Marussia Manor Racing | (Indonesia) Rio Haryanto | 16 | 2 | 0 | 1 | 31 | 7th | **3rd** |
| 2011 | Dallara GP3/10-Renault | (United Kingdom) Marussia Manor Racing | (Finland) Matias Laine | 16 | 0 | 0 | 0 | 0 | 31st | **3rd** |
| 2012 | Dallara GP3/10-Renault | (United Kingdom) Marussia Manor Racing | (Cyprus) Tio Ellinas | 16 | 1 | 0 | 3 | 97 | 8th | 5th |
| 2012 | Dallara GP3/10-Renault | (United Kingdom) Marussia Manor Racing | (Brazil) Fabiano Machado | 16 | 0 | 0 | 0 | 0 | 21st | 5th |
| 2012 | Dallara GP3/10-Renault | (United Kingdom) Marussia Manor Racing | (Russia) Dmitry Suranovich | 16 | 0 | 0 | 0 | 0 | 23rd | 5th |
| 2013 | Dallara GP3/13-AER | (United Kingdom) Marussia Manor Racing | (Cyprus) Tio Ellinas | 16 | 2 | 1 | 1 | 116 | 4th | 5th |
| 2013 | Dallara GP3/13-AER | (United Kingdom) Marussia Manor Racing | (United Kingdom) Ryan Cullen | 16 | 0 | 0 | 0 | 0 | 29th | 5th |
| 2013 | Dallara GP3/13-AER | (United Kingdom) Marussia Manor Racing | (United Kingdom) Dino Zamparelli | 16 | 0 | 0 | 0 | 13 | 18th | 5th |
| 2014 | Dallara GP3/13-AER | (United Kingdom) Marussia Manor Racing | (Finland) Patrick Kujala (Note: Kujala joined Trident Racing for the last two weekends of the 2014 season. At that point he had collected 22 points with Marussia Manor Racing.) | 18 | 0 | 0 | 0 | 22 | 14th | 6th |
| 2014 | Dallara GP3/13-AER | (United Kingdom) Marussia Manor Racing | (United Kingdom) Ryan Cullen (Note: Cullen joined Trident Racing for the last round of the 2014 season.) | 16 | 0 | 0 | 0 | 0 | 25th | 6th |
| 2014 | Dallara GP3/13-AER | (United Kingdom) Marussia Manor Racing | (United Kingdom) Dean Stoneman (Note: Stoneman joined Koiranen GP for the last two weekends of the 2014 season. At that point he had collected 95 points with Marussia Manor Racing.) | 18 | 5 | 1 | 2 | 163 | **2nd** | 6th |

==== In detail ====
(key) (Races in bold indicate pole position) (Races in italics indicate fastest lap)

| Year | Chassis Engine Tyres | Drivers | 1 | 2 | 3 | 4 | 5 | 6 | 7 | 8 | 9 | 10 | 11 | 12 | 13 | 14 | 15 | 16 | 17 | 18 | T.C. | Points |
|---|---|---|---|---|---|---|---|---|---|---|---|---|---|---|---|---|---|---|---|---|---|---|
| 2010 | GP3/10; Renault; **P** | | CAT; FEA | CAT; SPR | IST; FEA | IST; SPR | VAL; FEA | VAL; SPR | SIL; FEA | SIL; SPR | HOC; FEA | HOC; SPR | HUN; FEA | HUN; SPR | SPA; FEA | SPA; SPR | MNZ; FEA | MNZ; SPR | | | 4th | 64 |
| 2010 | GP3/10; Renault; **P** | (United Kingdom) James Jakes | 9 | 7 | 2 | 8 | 8 | 3 | Ret | 11 | 2 | Ret | | | | | 13 | Ret | | | 4th | 64 |
| 2010 | GP3/10; Renault; **P** | (France) Adrien Tambay | | | | | | | | | | | 18 | 9 | Ret | 1 | | | | | 4th | 64 |
| 2010 | GP3/10; Renault; **P** | (Indonesia) Rio Haryanto | 20 | 25 | 8 | 1 | 6 | 4 | 2 | Ret | Ret | Ret | 20 | 11 | 18 | 18 | 3 | 23 | | | 4th | 64 |
| 2010 | GP3/10; Renault; **P** | (United Kingdom) Adrian Quaife-Hobbs | 21 | 26 | Ret | Ret | 12 | 5 | Ret | Ret | DNS | 18 | 12 | 7 | 3 | 5 | 17 | 2 | | | 4th | 64 |
| 2011 | GP3/10; Renault; **P** | | IST; FEA | IST; SPR | CAT; FEA | CAT; SPR | VAL; FEA | VAL; SPR | SIL; FEA | SIL; SPR | NÜR; FEA | NÜR; SPR | HUN; FEA | HUN; SPR | SPA; FEA | SPA; SPR | MNZ; FEA | MNZ; SPR | | | 3rd | 67 |
| 2011 | GP3/10; Renault; **P** | (United Kingdom) Adrian Quaife-Hobbs | 24 | 16 | 11 | 23 | 1 | 8 | **4** | 15 | 5 | Ret | 3 | 10 | 4 | Ret | **Ret** | 6 | | | 3rd | 67 |
| 2011 | GP3/10; Renault; **P** | (Indonesia) Rio Haryanto | 26 | 10 | 20 | 11 | 19 | 22^{†} | 10 | 4 | 1 | 10 | 9 | 1 | 12 | 9 | 3 | 2 | | | 3rd | 67 |
| 2011 | GP3/10; Renault; **P** | (Finland) Matias Laine | 18 | Ret | 19 | 24 | 17 | Ret | Ret | Ret | 14 | 23 | 14 | 21 | 18 | Ret | 20 | Ret | | | 3rd | 67 |
| 2012 | GP3/10; Renault; **P** | | CAT; FEA | CAT; SPR | MON; FEA | MON; SPR | VAL; FEA | VAL; SPR | SIL; FEA | SIL; SPR | HOC; FEA | HOC; SPR | HUN; FEA | HUN; SPR | SPA; FEA | SPA; SPR | MNZ; FEA | MNZ; SPR | | | 5th | 97 |
| 2012 | GP3/10; Renault; **P** | (Russia) Dmitry Suranovich | 11 | Ret | 16 | DSQ | Ret | 15 | 22 | 20† | 15 | 14 | Ret | 16 | 22 | 18 | 22^{†} | DNS | | | 5th | 97 |
| 2012 | GP3/10; Renault; **P** | (Brazil) Fabiano Machado | 16 | Ret | 15 | 17 | Ret | 19 | 19 | 9 | Ret | Ret | DNS | DNS | 25 | 21 | Ret | 16 | | | 5th | 97 |
| 2012 | GP3/10; Renault; **P** | (Cyprus) Tio Ellinas | 7 | 15 | 9 | 8 | 4 | 5 | 6 | 4 | 10 | 7 | 13 | 4 | 4 | Ret | 2 | 1 | | | 5th | 97 |
| 2013 | GP3/13; AER; **P** | | CAT; FEA | CAT; SPR | VAL; FEA | VAL; SPR | SIL; FEA | SIL; SPR | NÜR; FEA | NÜR; SPR | HUN; FEA | HUN; SPR | SPA; FEA | SPA; SPR | MNZ; FEA | MNZ; SPR | YMC; FEA | YMC; SPR | | | 5th | 129 |
| 2013 | GP3/13; AER; **P** | (Cyprus) Tio Ellinas | **1** | 4 | 6 | 4 | 5 | 6 | 2 | 6 | 11 | 10 | 8 | Ret | Ret | 11 | 7 | 1 | | | 5th | 129 |
| 2013 | GP3/13; AER; **P** | (United Kingdom) Ryan Cullen | 21 | Ret | 20 | 20 | 21 | 17 | 19 | 25 | 23 | Ret | 18 | 17 | 20 | Ret | 20 | 24 | | | 5th | 129 |
| 2013 | GP3/13; AER; **P** | (United Kingdom) Dino Zamparelli | Ret | 15 | 9 | 10 | 10 | Ret | 9 | 7 | 12 | 20 | 10 | 7 | Ret | EX | 9 | 8 | | | 5th | 129 |
| 2014 | GP3/13; AER; **P** | | CAT; FEA | CAT; SPR | RBR; FEA | RBR; SPR | SIL; FEA | SIL; SPR | HOC; FEA | HOC; SPR | HUN; FEA | HUN; SPR | SPA; FEA | SPA; SPR | MNZ; FEA | MNZ; SPR | SOC; FEA | SOC; SPR | YMC; FEA | YMC; SPR | 6th | 117 |
| 2014 | GP3/13; AER; **P** | (Finland) Patrick Kujala | 4 | Ret | 9 | 7 | 12 | Ret | 25^{†} | 16 | 13 | 10 | Ret | 21 | 7 | Ret | | | | | 6th | 117 |
| 2014 | GP3/13; AER; **P** | (United Kingdom) Ryan Cullen | 15 | 16 | 17 | 13 | 19 | Ret | 20 | 19 | 24 | 21 | 14 | 13 | Ret | 16 | | | | | 6th | 117 |
| 2014 | GP3/13; AER; **P** | (United Kingdom) Dean Stoneman | 7 | 1 | Ret | 10 | 10 | 18^{†} | 5 | 4 | 9 | 8 | 1 | 9 | 5 | 1 | | | | | 6th | 117 |

=== World Endurance Championship ===
| Year | Entrant | No. | Car | Class | Driver | Races | Wins | Poles | Points | D.C. | T.C. |
|---|---|---|---|---|---|---|---|---|---|---|---|
| 2016 | (United Kingdom) Manor | 44 | Oreca 05-Nissan | LMP2 | (Thailand) Tor Graves | 4 | 0 | 0 | 14 | 25th | 10th |
| 2016 | (United Kingdom) Manor | 44 | Oreca 05-Nissan | LMP2 | (United Kingdom) James Jakes | 2 | 0 | 0 | 4 | 31st | 10th |
| 2016 | (United Kingdom) Manor | 44 | Oreca 05-Nissan | LMP2 | (United Kingdom) Will Stevens | 2 | 0 | 0 | 4 | 7th | 10th |
| 2016 | (United Kingdom) Manor | 44 | Oreca 05-Nissan | LMP2 | (United Kingdom) Matt Rao | 6 | 0 | 1 | 10 | 17th | 10th |
| 2016 | (United Kingdom) Manor | 44 | Oreca 05-Nissan | LMP2 | (Spain) Roberto Merhi | 3 | 0 | 0 | 6 | 14th | 10th |
| 2016 | (United Kingdom) Manor | 44 | Oreca 05-Nissan | LMP2 | (Brazil) Antônio Pizzonia | 1 | 0 | 0 | 10 | 27th | 10th |
| 2016 | (United Kingdom) Manor | 44 | Oreca 05-Nissan | LMP2 | (United Kingdom) Matthew Howson | 1 | 0 | 0 | 10 | 27th | 10th |
| 2016 | (United Kingdom) Manor | 44 | Oreca 05-Nissan | LMP2 | (United Kingdom) Richard Bradley | 5 | 0 | 1 | 10 | 17th | 10th |
| 2016 | (United Kingdom) Manor | 44 | Oreca 05-Nissan | LMP2 | (Mexico) Alfonso Toledano Jr. | 1 | 0 | 0 | 0 | NC | 10th |
| 2016 | (United Kingdom) Manor | 44 | Oreca 05-Nissan | LMP2 | (United Kingdom) Alex Lynn | 2 | 0 | 1 | 4 | 30th | 10th |
| 2016 | (United Kingdom) Manor | 45 | Oreca 05-Nissan | LMP2 | (United Kingdom) Matt Rao | 3 | 0 | 0 | 23 | 17th | NC (Note: Car ineligible for LMP2 Teams Championship.) |
| 2016 | (United Kingdom) Manor | 45 | Oreca 05-Nissan | LMP2 | (United Kingdom) Richard Bradley | 3 | 0 | 0 | 23 | 17th | NC |
| 2016 | (United Kingdom) Manor | 45 | Oreca 05-Nissan | LMP2 | (Spain) Roberto Merhi | 4 | 0 | 0 | 29 | 14th | NC |
| 2016 | (United Kingdom) Manor | 45 | Oreca 05-Nissan | LMP2 | (Thailand) Tor Graves | 2 | 0 | 0 | 0.5 | 25th | NC |
| 2016 | (United Kingdom) Manor | 45 | Oreca 05-Nissan | LMP2 | (United Kingdom) Alex Lynn | 1 | 0 | 0 | 0.5 | 30th | NC |
| 2016 | (United Kingdom) Manor | 45 | Oreca 05-Nissan | LMP2 | (Japan) Shinji Nakano | 1 | 0 | 0 | 0.5 | 32nd | NC |
| 2016 | (United Kingdom) Manor | 45 | Oreca 05-Nissan | LMP2 | (Mexico) Roberto González | 2 | 0 | 0 | 6 | 29th | NC |
| 2016 | (United Kingdom) Manor | 45 | Oreca 05-Nissan | LMP2 | (Switzerland) Mathias Beche | 1 | 0 | 0 | 0 | NC | NC |
| 2016 | (United Kingdom) Manor | 45 | Oreca 05-Nissan | LMP2 | (France) Julien Canal | 1 | 0 | 0 | 6 | 29th | NC |
| 2017 | (China) CEFC Manor TRS Racing | 24 | Oreca 07-Gibson | LMP2 | (Thailand) Tor Graves | 3 | 0 | 0 | 34 | 7th | 7th |
| 2017 | (China) CEFC Manor TRS Racing | 24 | Oreca 07-Gibson | LMP2 | (Switzerland) Jonathan Hirschi | 3 | 0 | 0 | 34 | 7th | 7th |
| 2017 | (China) CEFC Manor TRS Racing | 24 | Oreca 07-Gibson | LMP2 | (France) Jean-Éric Vergne | 3 | 0 | 0 | 34 | 7th | 7th |
| 2017 | (China) CEFC Manor TRS Racing | 25 | Oreca 07-Gibson | LMP2 | (Mexico) Roberto González | 3 | 0 | 0 | 10 | 13th | 13th |
| 2017 | (China) CEFC Manor TRS Racing | 25 | Oreca 07-Gibson | LMP2 | (Russia) Vitaly Petrov | 3 | 0 | 0 | 10 | 13th | 13th |
| 2017 | (China) CEFC Manor TRS Racing | 25 | Oreca 07-Gibson | LMP2 | (Switzerland) Simon Trummer | 3 | 0 | 0 | 10 | 13th | 13th |
| 2018–19 | (China) CEFC TRSM Racing | 5 | Ginetta G60-LT-P1 | LMP1 | (United Kingdom) Charlie Robertson | 1 | 0 | 0 | 0 | NC | 6th |
| 2018–19 | (China) CEFC TRSM Racing | 5 | Ginetta G60-LT-P1 | LMP1 | (France) Léo Roussel | 1 | 0 | 0 | 0 | NC | 6th |
| 2018–19 | (China) CEFC TRSM Racing | 5 | Ginetta G60-LT-P1 | LMP1 | (United Kingdom) Mike Simpson | 1 | 0 | 0 | 0 | NC | 6th |
| 2018–19 | (China) CEFC TRSM Racing | 5 | Ginetta G60-LT-P1 | LMP1 | (United Kingdom) Dean Stoneman | 0 | 0 | 0 | 0 | NC | 6th |
| 2018–19 | (China) CEFC TRSM Racing | 6 | Ginetta G60-LT-P1 | LMP1 | (United Kingdom) Alex Brundle | 1 | 0 | 0 | 0 | NC | 6th |
| 2018–19 | (China) CEFC TRSM Racing | 6 | Ginetta G60-LT-P1 | LMP1 | (United Kingdom) Oliver Rowland | 1 | 0 | 0 | 0 | NC | 6th |
| 2018–19 | (China) CEFC TRSM Racing | 6 | Ginetta G60-LT-P1 | LMP1 | (United Kingdom) Oliver Turvey | 1 | 0 | 0 | 0 | NC | 6th |

=== 24 Hours of Le Mans ===
| Year | Entrant | No. | Car | Drivers | Class | Laps | Pos. | Class Pos. |
|---|---|---|---|---|---|---|---|---|
| 2016 | (United Kingdom) Manor | 44 | Oreca 05-Nissan | (Thailand) Tor Graves (Spain) Roberto Merhi (United Kingdom) Matt Rao | LMP2 | 283 | DNF | DNF |
| 2017 | (China) CEFC Manor TRS Racing | 24 | Oreca 07-Gibson | (Thailand) Tor Graves (Switzerland) Jonathan Hirschi (France) Jean-Éric Vergne | LMP2 | 360 | 7th | 6th |
| 2017 | (China) CEFC Manor TRS Racing | 25 | Oreca 07-Gibson | (Mexico) Roberto González (Russia) Vitaly Petrov (Switzerland) Simon Trummer | LMP2 | 152 | DNF | DNF |
| 2018 | (China) CEFC TRSM Racing | 5 | Ginetta G60-LT-P1 | (United Kingdom) Charlie Robertson (France) Léo Roussel (United Kingdom) Mike Simpson | LMP1 | 283 (Note: The No. 5 Ginetta was penalised 6 laps and 2:45.613 by the stewards following the race for Léo Roussel failing to meet the minimum overall drive time of six hours.) | 41st | 5th |
| 2018 | (China) CEFC TRSM Racing | 6 | Ginetta G60-LT-P1 | (United Kingdom) Alex Brundle (United Kingdom) Oliver Rowland (United Kingdom) Oliver Turvey | LMP1 | 137 | DNF | DNF |

== Timeline ==
Former series
| British Formula Renault Championship | 1990–2011 |
| Eurocup Formula Renault 2.0 | 1991–2003, 2010, 2012–2015 |
| British Formula 3 Championship | 1999–2003, 2010 |
| Formula 3 Euro Series | 2004–2009 |
| GP3 Series | 2010–2014 |
| Formula One | 2010–2015 |
| Auto GP | 2012–2013 |
| Formula Renault 2.0 Northern European Cup | 2012–2015 |
| FIA World Endurance Championship | 2016-2018 |
