= Toby Scheckter =

South African racing driver (born 1978)

- Nationality: (South Africa) South African
- Born: Toby Samuel Scheckter; 25 August 1978 (age 48) Monte Carlo (Monaco)
- Relatives: Jody Scheckter (father); Ian Scheckter (uncle); Tomas Scheckter (brother); Jaki Scheckter (cousin)

Toby Samuel Scheckter (born 25 August 1978) is a South African racing driver. He is the son of 1979 Formula One World Champion Jody Scheckter, and the brother of IndyCar Series driver Tomas Scheckter. He won the SKUSA SuperNats kart finals in Las Vegas in 2004. He has also competed in such series as Eurocup Formula Renault 2.0 and the British Formula Three Championship. Scheckter recently launched Scheckter's Organic Beverages Ltd and their first product, Scheckter's OrganicEnergy drink.
