= 2007 International Pokka 1000km =

Sports car endurance race

2007 1000 km Suzuka

Seasons
- ← 2006 2008 →

Layout of the Suzuka International Racing Course

The 2007 International Pokka 1000km was the sixth round of the 2007 Super GT season and the 36th running of the 1000 km Suzuka. It took place on August 19, 2007.

== Race results ==
Results are as follows:

Pos	Class	No	Team	Drivers	Chassis	Tyre	Laps
1	GT500	1	Houzan TOM'S	(Japan) Juichi Wakisaka (Germany) André Lotterer (United Kingdom) Oliver Jarvis	Lexus SC430	B	173
2	GT500	8	Autobacs Racing Team Aguri	(Japan) Daisuke Ito (Republic of Ireland) Ralph Firman (Japan) Yuji Ide	Honda NSX	B	173
3	GT500	23	Xanavi NISMO	(Japan) Satoshi Motoyama (United Kingdom) Richard Lyons (Japan) Hironobu Yasuda	Nissan Z	B	172
4	GT500	100	Raybrig Team Kunimitsu	(Japan) Shinya Hosokawa (Germany) Dominik Schwager	Honda NSX	B	172
5	GT500	17	Rolling Stone Real Racing	(Japan) Takuya Izawa (Japan) Toshihiro Kaneishi (Japan) Katsutomo Kaneishi	Honda NSX	B	171
6	GT500	22	Motul NISMO	(Germany) Michael Krumm (Japan) Tsugio Matsuda	Nissan Z	B	171
7	GT500	38	ZENT Team Cerumo	(Japan) Yuji Tachikawa (Japan) Toranosuke Takagi	Lexus SC430	B	170
8	GT500	3	Yellowhat Hasemi Motorsport	(Japan) Masataka Yanagida (France) Sebastien Philippe	Nissan Z	B	170
9	GT500	6	ForumEng Team LeMans	(Japan) Tatsuya Kataoka (Sweden) Björn Wirdheim	Lexus SC430	B	170
10	GT500	24	Woodone Kondo Racing	(Brazil) João Paulo de Oliveira (Japan) Seiji Ara	Nissan Z	Y	170
11	GT300	2	Privee Cars Tokai Dream28	(Japan) Kazuho Takahashi (Japan) Hiroki Kato (Japan) Hiroki Yoshimoto	Mooncraft Shiden	Y	159
12	GT300	43	Autobacs Racing Team Aguri	(Japan) Shinichi Takagi (Japan) Morio Nitta	ASL Garaiya	M	159
13	GT300	62	Willcom R&D Sport	(Japan) Shinsuke Shibahara (Japan) Haruki Kurosawa	Vemac RD408R	Y	159
14	GT300	46	Houzan MOLA	(Japan) Kota Sasaki (Japan) Naoki Yokomizo	Nissan Z	D	159
15	GT300	13	ENDLESS Sports	(Japan) Masami Kageyama (Japan) Tomonobu Fujii	Nissan Z	Y	158
16	GT300	96	EBBRO Team NOVA	(Japan) Tetsuya Tanaka (Japan) Shinsuke Yamazaki (Japan) Akira Watanabe	Vemac RD350R	Y	157
17	GT300	31	Double Head apr	(Japan) Yuya Sakamoto (Japan) Kyosuke Mineo	Toyota MR-S	M	157
18	GT300	47	Houzan MOLA	(Japan) Shigekazu Wakisaka (Japan) Shogo Mitsuyama	Nissan Z	D	157
19	GT300	55	DHG Racing	(Japan) Taku Bamba (Japan) Daisuke Ikeda (Japan) Hideo Fukuyama	Ford GT	Y	156
20	GT300	333	Team Uematsu	(Japan) Tadao Uematsu (Japan) Ryohei Sakaguchi (Japan) Takashi Inoue	Vemac RD320R	Y	156
21	GT300	7	RE Amemiya	(Japan) Ryo Orime (Japan) Hiroyuki Iiri (Japan) Naoya Yamano	Mazda RX-7	Y	156
22	GT300	19	WedsSport Racing Project Bandoh	(Japan) Akira Iida (Japan) Yuhi Sekiguchi	Toyota Celica	Y	156
23	GT300	666	Bomex Rosso	(Japan) Junichiro Yamashita (Japan) Shogo Suho (Japan) Masato Shimoyama	Vemac RD320R	Y	150
24	GT300	101	Toy Story apr	(Japan) Kazuya Oshima (Japan) Hiroaki Ishiura	Toyota MR-S	M	149
25	GT300	70	Team Gaikokuya	(Japan) Yoshimi Ishibashi (Japan) Hiroshi Koizumi (Japan) Akazame Oyaji	Porsche 911 GT3 RS	Y	148
26	GT300	33	Hankook KTR	(Japan) Mitsuhiro Kinoshita (Japan) Yuya Sakamoto	Porsche 911 GT3R	H	145
27	GT500	39	Denso Team SARD	(Portugal) André Couto (Japan) Katsuyuki Hiranaka	Lexus SC430	B	143
28	GT500	18	Takata Dome	(Japan) Takashi Kogure (Japan) Ryo Michigami	Honda NSX	B	140
29	GT300	67	triple a JLOC	(Japan) Tsubasa Kurosawa (Japan) Hisashi Wada (Japan) Naohiro Furuya	Lamborghini Gallardo RG-3	Y	137
30	GT500	32	EPSON Nakajima Racing	(Brazil) Fabio Carbone (France) Loïc Duval	Honda NSX	D	134
31	GT300	9	LeyJun A&S Racing	(Japan) OSAMU (Japan) Masaki Tanaka (Japan) Katsuhiko Tsutsui	Mosler MT900R	D	120
DNF	GT300	77	Cusco Racing	(Japan) Tetsuya Yamano (Japan) Takayuki Aoki (Japan) Katsuo Kobayashi	Subaru Impreza	D	90
DNF	GT500	12	Calsonic Team Impul	(Japan) Kazuki Hoshino (France) Benoît Tréluyer (France) Jérémie Dufour	Nissan Z	B	63
DNF	GT300	26	Yunkerpower Team Taisan	(Japan) Nobuteru Taniguchi (Japan) Kazuyuki Nishizawa (Germany) Dominik Farnbacher	Porsche 996 GT3-RS	Y	57
DNF	GT300	110	Arktech Motorsports	(Japan) Takuya Kurosawa (Japan) Hidetoshi Mitsusada	Porsche Boxster	K	51
DNF	GT500	25	Eclipse Team Tsuchiya	(Japan) Manabu Orido (Japan) Takeshi Tsuchiya	Lexus SC430	Y	50
DNF	GT300	111	Arktech Motorsports	(Japan) 'Guts' Jyonai (Japan) Yasushi Kikuchi (Japan) Takaya Tsubobayashi	Porsche Boxster	K	20
DNF	GT300	5	Team Mach	(Japan) Tetsuji Tamanaka (Japan) Hironori Takeuchi (Japan) Keita Sawa	Vemac RD320R	Y	16
DNF	GT500	35	Bandai Team Kraft	(Japan) Naoki Hattori (United Kingdom) Peter Dumbreck (Italy) Ronnie Quintarelli	Lexus SC430	D	0
DSQ	GT300	11	JIM Gainer Racing	(Japan) Masayuki Ueda (Japan) Hideshi Matsuda (Japan) Ichijo Suga	Ferrari 360	D	

== Statistics ==
- GT500 Pole Position – #3 Hasemi Z – 1:55.781
- GT300 Pole Position – #2 Privee Shiden – 2:06.838
- GT500 Fastest Lap – #23 NISMO Z – 1:57.998
- GT300 Fastest Lap – #2 Privee Shiden – 2:07.515
- Winner's Race Time – 6:04:10.983
