= 2006 International Pokka 1000km =

Sports car endurance race

2006 1000 km Suzuka

Seasons
- ← 2005 2007 →

Layout of the Suzuka International Racing Course

The 2006 International Pokka 1000 km was the sixth round of the 2006 Super GT season and the 35th running of the 1000 km Suzuka. It took place on August 20, 2006.

== Race results ==
Results are as follows:

Pos	Class	No	Team	Drivers	Chassis	Tyre	Laps
1	GT500	12	Calsonic Team Impul	(Japan) Kazuki Hoshino (France) Benoît Tréluyer (France) Jérémie Dufour	Nissan Z	B	173
2	GT500	22	Motul NISMO	(Germany) Michael Krumm (United Kingdom) Richard Lyons (Brazil) Fabio Carbone	Nissan Z	B	173
3	GT500	35	Bandai Team Kraft	(Japan) Naoki Hattori (United Kingdom) Peter Dumbreck (Japan) Eiichi Tajima	Lexus SC430	D	172
4	GT500	32	EPSON Nakajima Racing	(Japan) Hideki Mutoh (France) Loïc Duval	Honda NSX	D	172
5	GT500	24	Woodone Kondo Racing	(Japan) Masataka Yanagida (France) Érik Comas (Japan) Seiji Ara	Nissan Z	Y	172
6	GT500	8	Autobacs Racing Team Aguri	(Japan) Daisuke Ito (Republic of Ireland) Ralph Firman (Japan) Toshihiro Kaneishi	Honda NSX	B	172
7	GT500	1	ZENT Team Cerumo	(Japan) Yuji Tachikawa (Japan) Toranosuke Takagi (Italy) Ronnie Quintarelli	Lexus SC430	B	171
8	GT500	3	Yellowhat Hasemi Motorsport	(Japan) Naoki Yokomizo (Brazil) João Paulo de Oliveira (United Kingdom) Darren Manning	Nissan Z	B	171
9	GT500	100	Raybrig Team Kunimitsu	(Japan) Shinya Hosokawa (France) Sebastien Philippe	Honda NSX	B	168
10	GT500	36	OpenInterface TOM'S	(Japan) Juichi Wakisaka (Germany) André Lotterer (Germany) Adrian Sutil	Lexus SC430	B	166
11	GT300	52	Toyota Team Cerumo	(Japan) Hironori Takeuchi (Japan) Koki Saga (Japan) Keita Sawa	Toyota Celica	K	160
12	GT300	27	Direxiv Motorsport	(Japan) Nobuteru Taniguchi (Japan) Shogo Mitsuyama	Vemac RD320R	Y	159
13	GT300	101	Toy Story apr	(Japan) Morio Nitta (Japan) Shinichi Takagi	Toyota MR-S	M	159
14	GT300	7	Asparadrink RE Amemiya	(Japan) Tetsuya Yamano (Japan) Hiroyuki Iiri (Japan) Shinichi Yamaji	Mazda RX-7	Y	158
15	GT300	2	Cars Tokai Dream28	(Japan) Kazuho Takahashi (Japan) Hiroki Kato (Japan) Hiroki Yoshimoto	Mooncraft Shiden	Y	158
16	GT300	47	MOLA	(Japan) Hironobu Yasuda (Japan) Masaoki Nagashima	Nissan Z	D	158
17	GT300	62	Willcom R&D Sport	(Japan) Shinsuke Shibahara (Japan) Haruki Kurosawa	Vemac RD408R	Y	158
18	GT300	46	MOLA	(Japan) Kota Sasaki (Japan) Taku Bamba	Nissan Z	D	157
19	GT300	11	JIM Gainer Racing	(Japan) Takayuki Aoki (Japan) Tetsuya Tanaka	Ferrari 360	D	157
20	GT300	110	Arktech Motorsports	(Japan) Hideshi Matsuda (Japan) Ichijo Suga (Japan) Takaya Tsubobayashi	Porsche Boxster	Y	156
21	GT300	70	Team Gaikokuya	(Japan) Yoshimi Ishibashi (Japan) Yutaka Yamagishi (Japan) Isao Ihashi	Porsche 911 GT3 RS	Y	154
22	GT300	910	910 Racing with Team Ishimatsu	(Japan) Tadao Uematsu (Japan) Yasushi Kikuchi (Japan) Ryohei Sakaguchi	Porsche 911 GT3 RSR	Y	153
23	GT300	9	LeyJun A&S Racing	(Japan) OSAMU (Japan) Masaki Tanaka	Mosler MT900R	Y	153
24	GT300	777	Ryozanpaku apr	(Japan) Minoru Tanaka (Japan) Kazuya Oshima (Japan) Keiichi Kobayashi	Toyota MR-S	M	152
25	GT500	66	triple a Team SARD	(Portugal) André Couto (Japan) Katsuyuki Hiranaka (France) Soheil Ayari	Toyota Supra	B	143
26	GT300	111	RodeoDrive Team LeyJun	(Japan) 'Guts' Jyonai (Japan) Hiroya Iijima (Japan) Takeshi Namekawa	Porsche 911 GT3	Y	142
27	GT300	13	ENDLESS Sports	(Japan) Masami Kageyama (Japan) Tomonobu Fujii	Nissan Z	Y	133
28	GT300	87	JLOC	(Japan) Koji Yamanishi (Japan) Atsushi Yogo (Japan) Hisashi Wada	Lamborghini Murcielago	Y	120
29	GT300	5	Team Mach	(Japan) Tetsuji Tamanaka (Japan) Katsuhiko Tsutsui (Japan) Akira Watanabe	Vemac RD320R	Y	118
30	GT300	19	WedsSport Racing Project Bandoh	(Japan) Koji Matsuda (Japan) Shigekazu Wakisaka	Toyota Celica	Y	115
DNF	GT300	14	ENDLESS Sports	(Japan) Mitsuhiro Kinoshita (Japan) Kyosuke Mineo (Japan) Sunako Jukucho	Porsche 911 GT3R	H	106
DNF	GT500	25	Eclipse Team Tsuchiya	(Japan) Manabu Orido (Japan) Takeshi Tsuchiya (Japan) Hideki Noda	Toyota Supra	Y	90
DNF	GT300	88	AKTIO JLOC	(Italy) Marco Apicella (Japan) Yasutaka Hinoi (Japan) Naohiro Furuya	Lamborghini Murcielago	Y	76
DNF	GT300	55	DHG Racing	(Japan) Hidetoshi Mitsusada (Japan) Daisuke Ikeda (Japan) Hiroaki Ishiura	Ford GT	Y	30
DNF	GT500	6	Mobil 1 Team LeMans	(Japan) Akira Iida (Japan) Tatsuya Kataoka (Sweden) Björn Wirdheim	Lexus SC430	B	24
DNF	GT500	18	Takata Dome	(Japan) Takashi Kogure (Japan) Ryo Michigami (Japan) Katsutomo Kaneishi	Honda NSX	B	21
DNF	GT300	10	JIM Gainer Racing	(Japan) Hiromi Kozono (Japan) Naofumi Omoto (Japan) Eiji Yamada	Ferrari 360	D	7
DNF	GT300	96	EBBRO Team NOVA	(Japan) Takuya Kurosawa (Japan) Tsubasa Kurosawa	Vemac RD320R	D	2
DSQ^{1}	GT500	23	Xanavi NISMO	(Japan) Satoshi Motoyama (Japan) Tsugio Matsuda (Japan) Yuji Ide	Nissan Z	B	

- ^1 – The #23 Nissan Z was disqualified after driver Yuji Ide failed to serve a drive-through penalty after a collision with the #55 Ford GT.

== Statistics ==
- GT500 Pole Position – #12 Impul Z – 1:56.426
- GT300 Pole Position – #52 Cerumo Celica – 2:07.126
- GT500 Fastest Lap – #12 Impul Z – 1:58.829
- GT300 Fastest Lap – #19 WedsSport Celica – 2:08.824
- Winner's Race Time – 5:57:45.468
