= 2008 International Pokka 1000km =

Sports car endurance race

2008 1000 km Suzuka

Seasons
- ← 2007 2009 →

Layout of the Suzuka International Racing Course

The 2008 International Pokka 1000 km was the 6th round of the 2008 Super GT season and the 37th running of the 1000 km Suzuka. It took place on August 24, 2008.

== Race results ==
Results are as follows:

Pos	Class	No	Team	Drivers	Chassis	Tyre	Laps
1	GT500	12	Calsonic Team Impul	(France) Sebastien Philippe (Japan) Tsugio Matsuda	Nissan GT-R	B	173
2	GT500	100	Raybrig Team Kunimitsu	(Japan) Shinya Hosokawa (Japan) Yuji Ide (Japan) Kosuke Matsuura	Honda NSX	B	173
3	GT500	36	Petronas Team TOM'S	(Japan) Juichi Wakisaka (Germany) André Lotterer (Netherlands) Carlo van Dam	Lexus SC430	B	173
4	GT500	22	Motul NISMO	(Japan) Masataka Yanagida (Germany) Michael Krumm (Germany) Dominik Schwager	Nissan GT-R	B	173
5	GT500	3	Yellowhat Hasemi Motorsport	(Japan) Naoki Yokomizo (Italy) Ronnie Quintarelli	Nissan GT-R	B	173
6	GT500	6	ENEOS Team LeMans	(Japan) Akira Iida (Sweden) Björn Wirdheim (Brazil) Roberto Streit	Lexus SC430	B	173
7	GT500	24	Woodone Kondo Racing	(Japan) Seiji Ara (Brazil) João Paulo de Oliveira	Nissan GT-R	Y	173
8	GT500	23	Xanavi NISMO	(Japan) Satoshi Motoyama (France) Benoît Tréluyer (Brazil) Fabio Carbone	Nissan GT-R	B	173
9	GT500	38	ZENT Team Cerumo	(Japan) Yuji Tachikawa (United Kingdom) Richard Lyons	Lexus SC430	B	172
10	GT500	35	Houzan Team Kraft	(Japan) Tatsuya Kataoka (United Kingdom) Peter Dumbreck	Lexus SC430	B	172
11	GT500	32	EPSON Nakajima Racing	(Japan) Katsuyuki Hiranaka (France) Loïc Duval	Honda NSX	D	171
12	GT500	18	Takata Dome	(Japan) Takashi Kogure (Japan) Ryo Michigami	Honda NSX	B	169
13	GT500	1	Autobacs Racing Team Aguri	(Japan) Takuya Izawa (Republic of Ireland) Ralph Firman	Honda NSX	B	167
14	GT300	46	Leopalace MOLA	(Japan) Kazuki Hoshino (Japan) Hironobu Yasuda	Nissan Z	M	160
15	GT300	95	Lightning McQueen apr	(Japan) Kazuya Oshima (Japan) Keisuke Kunimoto (Japan) Yuya Sakamoto	Toyota MR-S	M	159
16	GT300	7	RE Amemiya	(Japan) Ryo Orime (Japan) Hiroyuki Iiri (Japan) Hiroyuki Matsumura	Mazda RX-7	Y	159
17	GT300	62	Willcom R&D Sport	(Japan) Shinsuke Shibahara (Japan) Haruki Kurosawa (Japan) Shogo Mitsuyama	Vemac RD408R	Y	159
18	GT300	26	Yunkerpower Team Taisan	(Japan) Nobuteru Taniguchi (Japan) Shinichi Yamaji (Japan) Keita Sawa	Porsche 996 GT3-RS	Y	159
19	GT300	81	Team Daishin	(Japan) Takayuki Aoki (Japan) Tomonobu Fujii	Nissan Z	Y	158
20	GT300	11	JIM Gainer Racing	(Japan) Tetsuya Tanaka (Japan) Masayuki Ueda	Ferrari F430 GT2	Y	157
21	GT300	111	Arktech Motorsports	(Japan) Takuya Kurosawa (Japan) Hiroshi Koizumi	Porsche Boxster	K	155
22	GT300	27	Team Shadow	(Japan) Takashi Inoue (South Korea) Hwang Jin Woo (Japan) Yasuhiro Takasaki	Porsche 996 GT3-RSR	H	155
23	GT300	5	Team Mach	(Japan) Tetsuji Tamanaka (Japan) Naoya Yamano (Japan) Katsuhiko Tsutsui	Vemac RD320R	Y	154
24	GT300	170	Team Gaikokuya	(Japan) Yoshimi Ishibashi (Japan) Yutaka Yamagishi (Japan) Kazuyoshi Takamizawa	Porsche 911 GT3-RS	Y	151
25	GT300	88	triple a JLOC	(Japan) Hideshi Matsuda (Japan) Naohiro Furuya (Japan) Yuya Sakamoto	Lamborghini Gallardo RG-3	Y	151
26	GT300	666	Bomex Rosso	(Japan) Junichiro Yamashita (Japan) Shogo Suho (Japan) Hiroshi Takamori	Vemac RD320R	K	150
27	GT300	87	AKTIO JLOC	(Japan) Hisashi Wada (Japan) Muneyuki Kurihara (Japan) Yoshihisa Namekata	Lamborghini Gallardo RG-3	Y	145
28	GT500	25	Eclipse Team Tsuchiya	(Japan) Hiroaki Ishiura (Japan) Takeshi Tsuchiya	Lexus SC430	Y	138
29	GT300	66	triple a JLOC	(Japan) Koji Yamanishi (Japan) Atsushi Yogo	Lamborghini Murcielago RG-1	Y	136
30	GT500	39	Denso Team SARD	(Portugal) André Couto (Japan) Koki Saga (Japan) Toranosuke Takagi	Lexus SC430	B	133
31	GT300	118	Tomei Sports	(Japan) Takashi Miyamoto (Japan) Masayuki Kurihara (Japan) 'Guts' Jyonai	Porsche 997 GT3-RS	Y	132
32	GT300	77	Cusco Racing	(Japan) Tetsuya Yamano (Japan) Kota Sasaki	Subaru Impreza	D	127
33	GT300	52	Green Tec Team Shift	(Japan) Takuya Kurosawa (Japan) Takuto Iguchi (Japan) Hideki Yamauchi	Lexus IS350	K	125
34	GT300	19	WedsSport Racing Project Bandoh	(Japan) Manabu Orido (Japan) Yuhi Sekiguchi (Japan) Tsubasa Abe	Toyota Celica	Y	118
DNF	GT500	17	Real Racing	(Japan) Koudai Tsukakoshi (Japan) Toshihiro Kaneishi (Japan) Katsutomo Kaneishi	Honda NSX	B	119
DNF	GT300	2	Privee Cars Tokai Dream28	(Japan) Kazuho Takahashi (Japan) Hiroki Kato (Japan) Hiroki Yoshimoto	Mooncraft Shiden	Y	91
DNF	GT300	33	Hankook KTR	(Japan) Mitsuhiro Kinoshita (Japan) Masami Kageyama	Porsche 911 GT3R	H	78
DNF	GT300	43	Autobacs Racing Team Aguri	(Japan) Shinichi Takagi (Japan) Morio Nitta (Japan) Kyosuke Mineo	ASL Garaiya	M	41
DNF	GT300	4	EBBRO Team Uematsu NOVA	(Japan) Ryohei Sakaguchi (Japan) Masaki Matsushita (Japan) Tadao Uematsu	Vemac RD320R	Y	31
DNF	GT300	111	Arktech Motorsports	(Japan) Daisuke Ikeda (Japan) Hidetoshi Mitsusada	Porsche Boxster	K	4

== Statistics ==
- GT500 Pole Position – #100 Raybrig NSX – 2:27.474
- GT300 Pole Position – #77 Cusco Impreza – 2:22.432
- GT500 Fastest Lap – #1 ARTA NSX – 1:57.897
- GT300 Fastest Lap – #19 WedsSport IS350 – 2:09.340
- Winner's Race Time – 5:56:31.327
