= 2004 All Japan Grand Touring Car Championship =

Motorsports season

The 2004 All Japan Grand Touring Car Championship was the twelfth season of Japan Automobile Federation GT premiere racing and the final season under the name All Japan Grand Touring Car Championship as for 2005 the series was renamed to Super GT. It was marked as well as the twenty-second season of a JAF-sanctioned sports car racing championship dating back to the All Japan Sports Prototype Championship. The GT500 class champions of 2004 were the #1 Xanavi NISMO Nissan Fairlady Z team driven by Satoshi Motoyama and Richard Lyons and the GT300 class champions were the #16 M-TEC Honda NSX driven by Tetsuya Yamano and Hiroyuki Yagi.

== Drivers and teams ==
=== GT500 ===
Team	Make	Car	Engine	No.	Drivers	Tyre	Rounds
Nismo	Nissan	Nissan Fairlady Z	Nissan VQ30DETT 3.0 L Twin Turbo V6	1	(United Kingdom) Richard Lyons	B	All
Nismo	Nissan	Nissan Fairlady Z	Nissan VQ30DETT 3.0 L Twin Turbo V6	1	(Japan) Satoshi Motoyama	B	All
Nismo	Nissan	Nissan Fairlady Z	Nissan VQ30DETT 3.0 L Twin Turbo V6	22	(Japan) Masami Kageyama	B	All
Nismo	Nissan	Nissan Fairlady Z	Nissan VQ30DETT 3.0 L Twin Turbo V6	22	(Germany) Michael Krumm	B	All
G'Zox Hasemi Motorsport	Nissan	Nissan Fairlady Z	Nissan VQ30DETT 3.0 L Twin Turbo V6	3	(France) Érik Comas	B	All
G'Zox Hasemi Motorsport	Nissan	Nissan Fairlady Z	Nissan VQ30DETT 3.0 L Twin Turbo V6	3	(Japan) Toshihiro Kaneishi	B	All
Esso Toyota Team LeMans	Toyota	Toyota Supra	Toyota 3UZ-FE 4.5 L V8	6	(Japan) Akira Iida	B	1–7
Esso Toyota Team LeMans	Toyota	Toyota Supra	Toyota 3UZ-FE 4.5 L V8	6	(Japan) Juichi Wakisaka	B	1–7
Autobacs Racing Team Aguri	Honda	Honda NSX	Honda C30A 3.0 L Twin Turbo V6	8	(Japan) Katsutomo Kaneishi	B	All
Autobacs Racing Team Aguri	Honda	Honda NSX	Honda C30A 3.0 L Twin Turbo V6	8	(Japan) Daisuke Ito	B	All
Calsonic Team Impul	Nissan	Nissan Fairlady Z	Nissan VQ30DETT 3.0 L Twin Turbo V6	12	(Japan) Yuji Ide	B	All
Calsonic Team Impul	Nissan	Nissan Fairlady Z	Nissan VQ30DETT 3.0 L Twin Turbo V6	12	(France) Benoît Tréluyer	B	All
Amprex Motorsports	Lamborghini	Lamborghini Murciélago R-GT	Lamborghini L535 6.0 L V12	15	(Japan) Genji Hashimoto	M	3–4
Amprex Motorsports	Lamborghini	Lamborghini Murciélago R-GT	Lamborghini L535 6.0 L V12	15	(Germany) Norman Simon	M	3–4
Takata Dome Racing Team	Honda	Honda NSX	Honda C30A 3.0 L Twin Turbo V6	18	(Japan) Ryō Michigami	B	All
Takata Dome Racing Team	Honda	Honda NSX	Honda C30A 3.0 L Twin Turbo V6	18	(France) Sébastien Philippe	B	All
Hitotsuyama Racing	Ferrari	Ferrari 550 GTS	Ferrari F133 5.9 L V12	21	(Japan) Hidetoshi Mitsusada	D	1–7
Hitotsuyama Racing	Ferrari	Ferrari 550 GTS	Ferrari F133 5.9 L V12	21	(Japan) Tadao Uematsu	D	1–7
Team Advan Tsuchiya	Toyota	Toyota Supra	Toyota 3UZ-FE 4.5 L V8	25	(Japan) Manabu Orido	Y	1–7
Team Advan Tsuchiya	Toyota	Toyota Supra	Toyota 3UZ-FE 4.5 L V8	25	(Germany) Dominik Schwager	Y	1–7
Epson Nakajima Racing	Honda	Honda NSX	Honda C30A 3.0 L Twin Turbo V6	32	(Germany) André Lotterer	B	All
Epson Nakajima Racing	Honda	Honda NSX	Honda C30A 3.0 L Twin Turbo V6	32	(Japan) Tsugio Matsuda	B	All
Yellow Hat Kraft	Toyota	Toyota Supra	Toyota 3UZ-FE 4.5 L V8	35	(Japan) Naoki Hattori	D	All
Yellow Hat Kraft	Toyota	Toyota Supra	Toyota 3UZ-FE 4.5 L V8	35	(Japan) Shigekazu Wakisaka	D	All
Toyota Team TOM'S	Toyota	Toyota Supra	Toyota 3UZ-FE 4.5 L V8	36	(Italy) Marco Apicella	B	1–7
Toyota Team TOM'S	Toyota	Toyota Supra	Toyota 3UZ-FE 4.5 L V8	36	(Japan) Takeshi Tsuchiya	B	1–7
Toyota Team TOM'S	Toyota	Toyota Supra	Toyota 3UZ-FE 4.5 L V8	37	(Australia) James Courtney	B	All
Toyota Team TOM'S	Toyota	Toyota Supra	Toyota 3UZ-FE 4.5 L V8	37	(Japan) Tatsuya Kataoka	B	All
au Toyota Team Cerumo	Toyota	Toyota Supra	Toyota 3UZ-FE 4.5 L V8	38	(Japan) Seiji Ara	B	1–7
au Toyota Team Cerumo	Toyota	Toyota Supra	Toyota 3UZ-FE 4.5 L V8	38	(Japan) Yuji Tachikawa	B	1–7
Denso Toyota Team SARD	Toyota	Toyota Supra	Toyota 3UZ-FE 4.5 L V8	39	(Portugal) André Couto	B	1–7
Denso Toyota Team SARD	Toyota	Toyota Supra	Toyota 3UZ-FE 4.5 L V8	39	(France) Jérémie Dufour	B	1–7
R&D Sport	Vemac	Vemac RD408R	Mugen MF408S 4.0 L V8	62	(Japan) Shogo Mitsuyama	D	7
R&D Sport	Vemac	Vemac RD408R	Mugen MF408S 4.0 L V8	62	(Japan) Shinsuke Shibahara	D	7
JLOC	Lamborghini	Lamborghini Murciélago R-GT	Lamborghini L535 6.0 L V12	88	(Japan) Hisashi Wada	D	2–3, 5–7
JLOC	Lamborghini	Lamborghini Murciélago R-GT	Lamborghini L535 6.0 L V12	88	(Japan) Koji Yamanishi	D	2–3, 5–7
JLOC	Lamborghini	Lamborghini Diablo JGT-1	Lamborghini L532 6.0 L V12	88	(Japan) Hisashi Wada	D	4
JLOC	Lamborghini	Lamborghini Diablo JGT-1	Lamborghini L532 6.0 L V12	88	(Japan) Koji Yamanishi	D	4
Raybrig Team Kunimitsu with Mooncraft	Honda	Honda NSX	Honda C30A 3.0 L Twin Turbo V6	100	(Japan) Hiroki Katoh	B	All
Raybrig Team Kunimitsu with Mooncraft	Honda	Honda NSX	Honda C30A 3.0 L Twin Turbo V6	100	(Japan) Shinji Nakano	B	All
Raybrig Team Kunimitsu with Mooncraft	Honda	Honda NSX	Honda C30A 3.0 L Twin Turbo V6	100	(France) Bruce Jouanny	B	NC

=== GT300 ===
Team	Make	Car	Engine	No.	Drivers	Tyre	Rounds
Verno Tokai Dream28	Honda	Honda NSX	Honda C32B 3.4 L V6	2	(Japan) Kazuho Takahashi	K	All
Verno Tokai Dream28	Honda	Honda NSX	Honda C32B 3.4 L V6	2	(Japan) Akira Watanabe	K	All
Verno Tokai Dream28	Honda	Honda NSX	Honda C32B 3.4 L V6	2	(Japan) Hiroki Yoshimoto	K	NC
Team Mach	Vemac	Vemac RD320R	Honda C32B 3.4 L V6	5	(Japan) Tetsuji Tamanaka	Y	All
Team Mach	Vemac	Vemac RD320R	Honda C32B 3.4 L V6	5	(Japan) "Gō Mifune"	Y	All
RE Amemiya Racing	Mazda	Mazda RX-7	Mazda RE20B 2.0 L 3-rotor	7	(Japan) Hiroyuki Iiri	Y	All
RE Amemiya Racing	Mazda	Mazda RX-7	Mazda RE20B 2.0 L 3-rotor	7	(Japan) Shinichi Yamaji	Y	All
A&S Racing	Mosler	Mosler MT900R	Chevrolet LS1 6.2 L V8	9	(Japan) Go Shimizu	Y	All
A&S Racing	Mosler	Mosler MT900R	Chevrolet LS1 6.2 L V8	9	(Japan) Shinya Hosokawa	Y	All
Jim Gainer Racing	Ferrari	Ferrari 360	Ferrari F131B 3.6 L V8	10	(Japan) Tetsuya Tanaka	D	All
Jim Gainer Racing	Ferrari	Ferrari 360	Ferrari F131B 3.6 L V8	10	(Japan) Atsushi Yogo	D	All
Jim Gainer Racing	Ferrari	Ferrari 360	Ferrari F131B 3.6 L V8	11	(Japan) Hideshi Matsuda	D	All
Jim Gainer Racing	Ferrari	Ferrari 360	Ferrari F131B 3.6 L V8	11	(Japan) Ichijo Suga	D	All
M-TEC	Honda	Honda NSX	Honda C32B 3.5 L V6	16	(Japan) Tetsuya Yamano	D	All
M-TEC	Honda	Honda NSX	Honda C32B 3.5 L V6	16	(Japan) Hiroyuki Yagi	D	All
M-TEC	Honda	Honda NSX	Honda C32B 3.5 L V6	16	(Japan) Haruki Kurosawa	D	NC
Spirit Motorsport	Toyota	Toyota Celica	Toyota 3S-GTE 2.0 L Turbo I4	17	(Japan) Masaoki Nagashima	Y	All
Spirit Motorsport	Toyota	Toyota Celica	Toyota 3S-GTE 2.0 L Turbo I4	17	(Japan) Matsunaga Matsuhiro	Y	All
Racing Project Bandoh	Toyota	Toyota Celica	Toyota 3S-GTE 2.0 L Turbo I4	19	(Japan) Takayuki Aoki	Y	All
Racing Project Bandoh	Toyota	Toyota Celica	Toyota 3S-GTE 2.0 L Turbo I4	19	(Japan) Nobuteru Taniguchi	Y	All
Racing Project Bandoh	Toyota	Toyota Celica	Toyota 3S-GTE 2.0 L Turbo I4	19	(Japan) Manabu Orido	Y	NC
Hitotsuyama Racing	Porsche	Porsche 996 GT3 RSR	Porsche M96/73 3.6 L F6	20	(Japan) Takashi Inoue	Y	All
Hitotsuyama Racing	Porsche	Porsche 996 GT3 RSR	Porsche M96/73 3.6 L F6	20	(Japan) Yasuo Miyagawa	Y	1–4
Hitotsuyama Racing	Porsche	Porsche 996 GT3 RSR	Porsche M96/73 3.6 L F6	20	(Japan) Hiroshi Wada	Y	5–7
Team Taisan	Porsche	Porsche 996 GT3-R	Porsche M96/77 3.6 L F6	26	(Japan) Yutaka Yamagishi	Y	All
Team Taisan	Porsche	Porsche 996 GT3-R	Porsche M96/77 3.6 L F6	26	(Japan) Kaoru Ijiri	Y	All
Team Taisan	Chrysler	Chrysler Viper GTS-R	Chrysler EWB 8.0 L V10	26	(Japan) Eiji Yamada	Y	NC
Team Taisan	Chrysler	Chrysler Viper GTS-R	Chrysler EWB 8.0 L V10	26	(Belgium) Patrick van Schoote	Y	NC
Team Reckless	Toyota	Toyota MR-S	Toyota 3S-GTE 2.0 L Turbo I4	30	(Japan) Kota Sasaki	BF	All
Team Reckless	Toyota	Toyota MR-S	Toyota 3S-GTE 2.0 L Turbo I4	30	(Japan) Satoshi Goto	BF	All
A'PEX with apr	Toyota	Toyota MR-S	Toyota 3S-GTE 2.0 L Turbo I4	31	(Japan) Minoru Tanaka	BF	All
A'PEX with apr	Toyota	Toyota MR-S	Toyota 3S-GTE 2.0 L Turbo I4	31	(Japan) Koji Matsuda	BF	All
Autobacs Racing Team Aguri	ASL	ASL ARTA Garaiya	Nissan VQ35DE 3.5 L V6	43	(Japan) Morio Nitta	BF	All
Autobacs Racing Team Aguri	ASL	ASL ARTA Garaiya	Nissan VQ35DE 3.5 L V6	43	(Japan) Shinichi Takagi	BF	All
Auto Staff Racing	Nissan	Nissan Silvia (S15)	Nissan SR20DET 2.0 L Turbo I4	51	(Japan) Masamasa Kato	Y	All
Auto Staff Racing	Nissan	Nissan Silvia (S15)	Nissan SR20DET 2.0 L Turbo I4	51	(Japan) Katsuhiko Tsutsui	Y	All
Toyota Team Cerumo	Toyota	Toyota Celica	Toyota 3S-GTE 2.0 L Turbo I4	52	(Japan) Hironori Takeuchi	D	All
Toyota Team Cerumo	Toyota	Toyota Celica	Toyota 3S-GTE 2.0 L Turbo I4	52	(Japan) Seigo Nishizawa	D	All
Team LeyJun	Vemac	Vemac RD320R	Honda C32B 3.4 L V6	63	(Japan) "OSAMU"	D	All
Team LeyJun	Vemac	Vemac RD320R	Honda C32B 3.4 L V6	63	(Japan) Hiroki Yoshimoto	D	1–5
Team LeyJun	Vemac	Vemac RD320R	Honda C32B 3.4 L V6	63	(Japan) Takaya Tsubobayashi	D	6–7
Team Gaikokuya	Porsche	Porsche 996 GT3-RS	Porsche M96/77 3.6 L F6	70	(Japan) Yoshimi Ishibashi	Y	All
Team Gaikokuya	Porsche	Porsche 996 GT3-RS	Porsche M96/77 3.6 L F6	70	(Japan) Hiromi	Y	1–3, 5–7
Team Gaikokuya	Porsche	Porsche 996 GT3-RS	Porsche M96/77 3.6 L F6	70	(Japan) Isao Ihashi	Y	4
Team Gaikokuya	Porsche	Porsche 996 GT3-RS	Porsche M96/77 3.6 L F6	72	(Japan) Akira Hirakawa	Y	All
Team Gaikokuya	Porsche	Porsche 996 GT3-RS	Porsche M96/77 3.6 L F6	72	(Japan) Guts Jyonai	Y	1–2
Team Gaikokuya	Porsche	Porsche 996 GT3-RS	Porsche M96/77 3.6 L F6	72	(Japan) Hideo Fukuyama	Y	3–7
Cusco Racing	Subaru	Subaru Impreza WRX STI	Subaru EJ20 2.0 L Turbo F4	77	(Japan) Katsuo Kobayashi	Y	All
Cusco Racing	Subaru	Subaru Impreza WRX STI	Subaru EJ20 2.0 L Turbo F4	77	(Japan) Tatsuya Tanigawa	Y	All
Team Daishin	Nissan	Nissan Fairlady Z	Nissan VQ35DE 3.5 L V6	80	(Japan) Mitsuhiro Kinoshita	Y	All
Team Daishin	Nissan	Nissan Fairlady Z	Nissan VQ35DE 3.5 L V6	80	(Japan) Kazuki Hoshino	Y	All
Team Daishin	Nissan	Nissan Fairlady Z	Nissan VQ35DE 3.5 L V6	81	(Japan) Masataka Yanagida	Y	All
Team Daishin	Nissan	Nissan Fairlady Z	Nissan VQ35DE 3.5 L V6	81	(Japan) Naofumi Omoto	Y	All
Arktech Motorsports	Porsche	Porsche 986 Boxster	Porsche M44/12 3.0 L I4	110	(Japan) Hiroya Iijima	Y	1–5, 7
Arktech Motorsports	Porsche	Porsche 986 Boxster	Porsche M44/12 3.0 L I4	110	(Japan) Takashi Ohi	Y	1–5, 7
Arktech Motorsports	Porsche	Porsche 996 GT3 Cup	Porsche M96/77 3.6 L F6	112	(Japan) Akihiko Tsutsumi	Y	2, 4
Arktech Motorsports	Porsche	Porsche 996 GT3 Cup	Porsche M96/77 3.6 L F6	112	(Japan) Keita Sawa	Y	2, 5, 7
Arktech Motorsports	Porsche	Porsche 996 GT3 Cup	Porsche M96/77 3.6 L F6	112	(Japan) Guts Jyonai	Y	4, 5, 7
910 Racing	Porsche	Porsche 996 GT3 RS	Porsche M96/77 3.6 L F6	910	(Japan) Kazuyoshi Takamizawa	Y	All
910 Racing	Porsche	Porsche 996 GT3 RS	Porsche M96/77 3.6 L F6	910	(Japan) Jukuchou Sunako	Y	All

== Schedule ==
Round	Race	Circuit	Date
1	GT Championship in TI	(Japan) TI Circuit	April 4
2	SUGO GT Championship	(Japan) Sportsland SUGO	May 23
3	Japan GT Championship Malaysia	(Malaysia) Sepang Circuit	June 19
4	Hokkaido Gran GT Championship	(Japan) Tokachi International Speedway	July 18
5	Motegi GT Championship Race	(Japan) Twin Ring Motegi	September 5
6	Japan GT in Kyushu 300 km	(Japan) Autopolis	October 31
7	Suzuka GT 300 km	(Japan) Suzuka Circuit	November 21
NC	JGTC All-Star GT Live USA	(United States) California Speedway	December 18
NC	JGTC All-Star GT Live USA	(United States) California Speedway	December 19

== Season results ==
Round	Circuit	GT500 Winning Team	GT300 Winning Team
Round	Circuit	GT500 Winning Drivers	GT300 Winning Drivers
1	TI Circuit	#1 Xanavi NISMO Nissan Z	#10 Team Gainer Ferrari F360
1	TI Circuit	(Japan) Satoshi Motoyama (United Kingdom) Richard Lyons	(Japan) Atsushi Yogo (Japan) Tetsuya Tanaka
2	Sportsland SUGO	#38 au Cerumo Toyota Supra	#19 WedsSport Toyota Celica
2	Sportsland SUGO	(Japan) Yuji Tachikawa (Japan) Seiji Ara	(Japan) Takayuki Aoki (Japan) Nobuteru Taniguchi
3	Sepang Circuit	#39 Denso Team SARD Toyota Supra	#7 RE Amemiya Mazda RX-7
3	Sepang Circuit	(Portugal) Andre Couto (France) Jeremie Dufour	(Japan) Shinichi Yamaji (Japan) Hiroyuki Iiri
4	Tokachi	#22 Motul NISMO Nissan Z	#43 ARTA ASL Garaiya
4	Tokachi	(Germany) Michael Krumm (Japan) Masami Kageyama	(Japan) Morio Nitta (Japan) Shinichi Takagi
5	Twin Ring Motegi	#32 PIAA Honda NSX	#43 ARTA ASL Garaiya
5	Twin Ring Motegi	(Japan) Tsugio Matsuda (Germany) André Lotterer	(Japan) Morio Nitta (Japan) Shinichi Takagi
6	Autopolis	#1 Xanavi NISMO Nissan Z	#7 RE Amemiya Mazda RX-7
6	Autopolis	(Japan) Satoshi Motoyama (United Kingdom) Richard Lyons	(Japan) Shinichi Yamaji (Japan) Hiroyuki Iiri
7	Suzuka Circuit	#12 Calsonic Impul Nissan Z	#16 M-TEC Honda NSX
7	Suzuka Circuit	(Japan) Yuji Ide (France) Benoît Tréluyer	(Japan) Tetsuya Yamano (Japan) Hiroyuki Yagi
NC	California Speedway	#3 G-ZOX Hasemi Motorsports Nissan Z	#16 M-TEC Honda NSX
NC	California Speedway	(Japan) Toshihiro Kaneishi (France) Érik Comas	(Japan) Tetsuya Yamano (Japan) Hiroyuki Yagi (Japan) Haruki Kurosawa
NC	California Speedway	#32 PIAA Honda NSX	#43 ARTA ASL Garaiya
NC	California Speedway	(Japan) Tsugio Matsuda (Germany) André Lotterer	(Japan) Morio Nitta (Japan) Shinichi Takagi

== Standings ==
=== GT500 class ===
==== Drivers' standings ====
Scoring system

Position	1st	2nd	3rd	4th	5th	6th	7th	8th	9th	10th
Points	20	15	12	8	6	5	4	3	2	1
Qualifying	2	1	1							
Fastest lap	1	1	1							

- There were no points awarded for pole position and fastest lap in the final race.

Rank	Driver	No.	TAI (Japan)	SUG (Japan)	SEP (Malaysia)	TOK (Japan)	MOT (Japan)	AUT (Japan)	SUZ (Japan)	FON (United States)	FON (United States)	Pts.
1	(Japan) Satoshi Motoyama (United Kingdom) Richard Lyons	1	1	DNS	3	Ret	3	1	7	Ret	DNS	73
2	(Portugal) André Couto (France) Jérémie Dufour	39	3	Ret	1	7	6	2	8			61
3	(Japan) Akira Iida (Japan) Juichi Wakisaka	6	2	11	14	2	2	4	Ret			57
4	(France) Érik Comas (Japan) Toshihiro Kaneishi	3	6	6	4	3	7	Ret	3	1	5	50
5	(Japan) Seiji Ara (Japan) Yuji Tachikawa	38	5	1	7	14	10	11	4			45
6	(Australia) James Courtney (Japan) Tatsuya Kataoka	37	11	3	5	5	4	6	6	5	2	44
7	(Italy) Marco Apicella (Japan) Takeshi Tsuchiya	36	7	7	10	4	5	7	2			43
8	(Germany) André Lotterer (Japan) Tsugio Matsuda	32	10	4	9	6	1	12	5	2	1	42
9	(Japan) Masami Kageyama (Germany) Michael Krumm	22	9	Ret	6	1	8	9	Ret	Ret	DNS	39
10	(Japan) Naoki Hattori (Japan) Shigekazu Wakisaka	35	4	5	2	9	13	8	16	3	Ret	37
11	(France) Benoît Tréluyer (Japan) Yuji Ide	12	8	10	Ret	11	Ret	5	1	4	DNS	35
12	(Japan) Manabu Orido (Germany) Dominik Schwager	25	14	2	Ret	13	12	3	10			31
13	(Japan) Hiroki Katoh (Japan) Shinji Nakano	100	Ret	8	15	10	9	10	9	6	4	9
14	(Japan) Ryō Michigami (France) Sébastien Philippe	18	12	12	8	8	15	14	12	Ret	3	6
15	(Japan) Katsutomo Kaneishi (Japan) Daisuke Ito	8	13	9	11	12	11	13	11	Ret	WD	2
-	(Japan) Genji Hashimoto (Germany) Norman Simon	15			12	15						0
-	(Japan) Hidetoshi Mitsusada (Japan) Tadao Uematsu	21	15	DNQ	13	16	14	15	14			0
-	(Japan) Shogo Mitsuyama (Japan) Shinsuke Shibahara	62							13			0
-	(Japan) Hisashi Wada (Japan) Koji Yamanishi	88		DNQ	Ret	DNQ	Ret	Ret	15			0
-	(France) Bruce Jouanny	100								6	4	0
Rank	Driver	No.	TAI (Japan)	SUG (Japan)	SEP (Malaysia)	TOK (Japan)	MOT (Japan)	AUT (Japan)	SUZ (Japan)	FON (United States)	FON (United States)	Pts.

Colour	Result
Gold	Winner
Silver	Second place
Bronze	Third place
Green	Points classification
Blue	Non-points classification
Blue	Non-classified finish (NC)
Purple	Retired, not classified (Ret)
Red	Did not qualify (DNQ)
Red	Did not pre-qualify (DNPQ)
Black	Disqualified (DSQ)
White	Did not start (DNS)
White	Withdrew (WD)
White	Race cancelled (C)
Blank	Did not practice (DNP)
Blank	Did not arrive (DNA)
Blank	Excluded (EX)

==== Teams' standings ====
For teams that entered multiple cars, only the best result from each round counted towards the teams' championship.

Rank	Driver	No.	TAI (Japan)	SUG (Japan)	SEP (Malaysia)	TOK (Japan)	MOT (Japan)	AUT (Japan)	SUZ (Japan)	FON (United States)	FON (United States)	Pts.
1	Nismo	1	1	DNS	3	Ret	3	1	7	Ret	DNS	98
1	Nismo	22	9	Ret	6	1	8	9	Ret	Ret	DNS	98
2	Toyota Team SARD	39	3	Ret	1	7	6	2	8			61
3	Toyota Team TOM'S	36	7	7	10	4	5	7	2			60
3	Toyota Team TOM'S	37	11	3	5	5	4	6	6	5	2	60
4	Esso Toyota Team LeMans	6	2	11	14	2	2	4	Ret			57
5	Hasemi Motorsport	3	6	6	4	3	7	Ret	3	1	5	50
6	Toyota Team Cerumo	38	5	1	7	14	10	11	4			45
7	Epson Nakajima Racing	32	10	4	9	6	1	12	5	2	1	42
8	Kraft	35	4	5	2	9	13	8	16	3	Ret	37
9	Team Impul	12	8	10	Ret	11	Ret	5	1	4	DNS	35
10	Team Advan Tsuchiya	25	14	2	Ret	13	12	3	10			31
11	Team Kunimitsu with Mooncraft	100	Ret	8	15	10	9	10	9	6	4	9
12	Dome Racing Team	18	12	12	8	8	15	14	12	Ret	3	6
13	Autobacs Racing Team Aguri	8	13	9	11	12	11	13	11	Ret	WD	2
-	Amprex Motorsports	15			12	15						0
-	Hitotsuyama Racing	21	15	DNQ	13	16	14	15	14			0
-	R&D Sport	62							13			0
-	JLOC	88		DNQ	Ret	DNQ	Ret	Ret	15			0
Rank	Driver	No.	TAI (Japan)	SUG (Japan)	SEP (Malaysia)	TOK (Japan)	MOT (Japan)	AUT (Japan)	SUZ (Japan)	FON (United States)	FON (United States)	Pts.

=== GT300 Drivers' championship ===
Rank	Driver	No.	TAI (Japan)	SUG (Japan)	SEP (Malaysia)	TOK (Japan)	MOT (Japan)	AUT (Japan)	SUZ (Japan)	FON (United States)	FON (United States)	Pts.
1	(Japan) Tetsuya Yamano (Japan) Hiroyuki Yagi	16	3	7	2	2	2	6	1	1	2	93
2	(Japan) Morio Nitta (Japan) Shinichi Takagi	43	2	5	21	1	1	2	2	Ret	1	92
3	(Japan) Tetsuya Tanaka (Japan) Atsushi Yogo	10	1	8	5	4	3	8	3			64
4	(Japan) Hiroyuki Iiri (Japan) Shinichi Yamaji	7	11	4	1	10	Ret	1	18	Ret	WD	55
5	(Japan) Takayuki Aoki (Japan) Nobuteru Taniguchi	19	4	1	NC	7	13	5	5	5	5	48
6	(Japan) Masataka Yanagida (Japan) Naofumi Omoto	81	19	14	6	3	4	19	7	2	4	33
7	(Japan) Takayuki Kinoshita (Japan) Kazuki Hoshino	80	8	11	7	9	17	4	6	7	3	29
8	(Japan) Hideshi Matsuda (Japan) Ichigo Suga	11	10	3	8	8	20	7	14			26
8	(Japan) Kota Sasaki (Japan) Satoshi Goto	30	9	13	4	15	6	9	4			26
10	(Japan) Tetsuji Tamanaka (Japan) "Gō Mifune"	5	5	16	3	18	5	12	12	Ret	DNS	24
11	(Japan) Katsuo Kobayashi (Japan) Tatsuya Tanigawa	77	14	12	18	6	11	3	11	3	Ret	17
12	(Japan) "OSAMU"	63	6	6	14	22	19	17	16	4	8	16
13	(Japan) Hiroki Yoshimoto	63	6	6	14	22	19					16
14	(Japan) Masahiro Matsunaga (Japan) Masaoki Nagashima	17	Ret	2	12	12	16	11	15			15
15	(Japan) Minoru Tanaka (Japan) Koji Matsuda	31	7	10	22	5	Ret	10	10			14
16	(Japan) Seigo Nishizawa (Japan) Hironori Takeuchi	52	17	20	9	23	8	18	9			9
17	(Japan) Yutaka Yamagishi	26		9	10	11	Ret	13	8			6
18	(Japan) Kaoru Ijiri	26		9		11	Ret	13	8			5
19	(Japan) Go Shimizu (Japan) Shinya Hosokawa	9	12	18	11	14	7	16	Ret			4
20	(Japan) Guts Jyonai	72/112	13	21		20	9		17			2
20	(Japan) Keita Sawa	112		15			9		17			2
22	(Japan) Akihiro Asai	26			10							1
23	(Japan) Masamasa Kato (Japan) Katsuhiko Tsutsui	51	DNQ	19	16	16	10	14	13			1
-	(Japan) Kazuyoshi Takamizawa (Japan) Jukuchou Sunako	910	16	24	15	19	12	22	20			0
-	(Japan) Akira Hirakawa	72	13	21	Ret	13	Ret	15	21			0
-	(Japan) Takashi Inoue	20		17	13	Ret	15	21	19			0
-	(Japan) Yasuo Miyagawa	20	15	17	13	Ret						0
-	(Japan) Hideo Fukuyama	72			Ret	13	Ret	15	21			0
-	(Japan) Kazuho Takahashi (Japan) Akira Watanabe	2	18	Ret	17	17	14	20	22	8	7	0
-	(Japan) Hiroshi Wada	20	15				15	21	19			0
-	(Japan) Akihiko Tsutsumi	112		15		20						0
-	(Japan) Takaya Tsubobayashi	63						17	16	4	8	0
-	(Japan) Yoshimi Ishibashi	70	Ret	23	20	Ret	18	23	24			0
-	(Japan) Hiromi Kozono	70	Ret	23	20		18	23	24			0
-	(Japan) Hiroya Iijima (Japan) Takashi Ohi	111	DNQ	22	19	21	Ret		23			0
-	(Japan) Isao Ihashi	70				Ret						0
-	(Japan) Haruki Kurosawa	16								1	2	0
-	(Japan) Manabu Orido	19								5	5	0
-	(Japan) Eiji Yamada (Belgium) Patrick van Schoote	26								9	6	0
-	(United States) Geoff Escalette (United States) Blake Rosser	6								6		0
-	(Japan) Daiki Yoshimoto	2								8	7	0
-	(United States) Steven Bernheim (United States) Dwain Derment	00								DNS		0
-	(United States) Mark Anderson	118								DNQ		0
-	(United States) G. Segal (United States) D. Puddster	421								DNQ		0
Rank	Driver	No.	TAI (Japan)	SUG (Japan)	SEP (Malaysia)	TOK (Japan)	MOT (Japan)	AUT (Japan)	SUZ (Japan)	FON (United States)	FON (United States)	Pts.

==== GT300 Teams' standings ====
For teams that entered multiple cars, only the best result from each round counted towards the teams' championship.

Rank	Team	No.	TAI (Japan)	SUG (Japan)	SEP (Malaysia)	TOK (Japan)	MOT (Japan)	AUT (Japan)	SUZ (Japan)	FON (United States)	FON (United States)	Pts.
1	M-TEC Co. LTD.	16	3	7	2	2	2	6	1	1	2	93
2	Autobacs Racing Team Aguri	43	2	5	21	1	1	2	2	Ret	1	92
3	Team Gainer	10	1	8	5	4	3	8	3			78
3	Team Gainer	11	10	3	8	8	20	7	14			78
4	RE Amemiya Racing	7	11	4	1	10	Ret	1	18	Ret	WD	55
5	Team Daishin	80	8	11	7	9	17	4	6	7	3	50
5	Team Daishin	81	19	14	6	3	4	19	7	2	4	50
6	Racing Project Bandoh	19	4	1	NC	7	13	5	5	5	5	48
7	Team Reckless	30	9	13	4	15	6	9	4			26
8	Team Mach	5	5	16	3	18	5	12	12	Ret	DNS	24
9	Cusco Racing	77	14	12	18	6	11	3	11	3	Ret	17
10	Team LeyJun	63	6	6	14	22	19	17	16	4	8	16
11	Spirit Motorsport	17	Ret	2	12	12	16	11	15			15
12	A'PEX with apr	31	7	10	22	5	Ret	10	10			14
13	Toyota Team Cerumo	52	17	20	9	23	8	18	9			9
14	Team Taisan	26		9	10	11	Ret	13	8	9	6	6
15	A&S Racing	9	12	18	11	14	7	16	Ret			4
16	Arktech Motorsports	111	DNQ	22	19	21	Ret		23			2
16	Arktech Motorsports	112		15		20	9		17			2
17	Auto Staff Racing	51	DNQ	19	16	16	10	14	13			1
-	910 Racing	910	16	24	15	19	12	22	20			0
-	Team Gaikokuya	70	Ret	23	20	Ret	18	23	24			0
-	Team Gaikokuya	72	13	21	Ret	13	Ret	15	21			0
-	Hitotsuyama Racing	20	15	17	13	Ret	15	21	19			0
-	Verno Tokai Dream28	2	18	Ret	17	17	14	20	22	8	7	0
-	Stuttgart Performance	6								6		0
-	Bernheim Porsche Racing	00								DNS		0
-	928 International	118								DNQ		0
-	Johnny Pag Racing	421								DNQ		0
Rank	Team	No.	TAI (Japan)	SUG (Japan)	SEP (Malaysia)	TOK (Japan)	MOT (Japan)	AUT (Japan)	SUZ (Japan)	FON (United States)	FON (United States)	Pts.
