= R&D Sport =

Japanese auto racing team

(Japan) R&D Sport
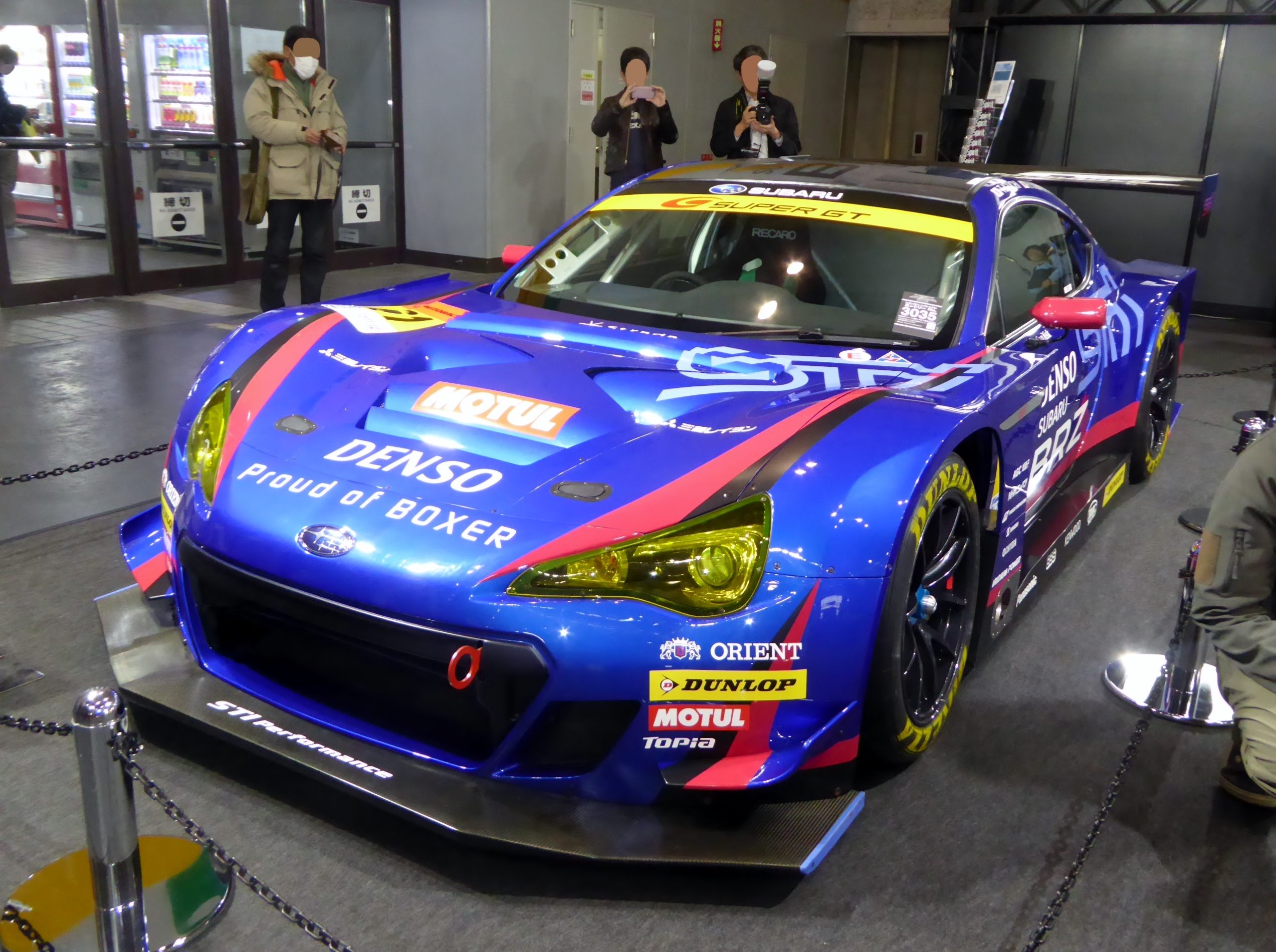
- Founded: November 7, 1991
- Base: Hiratsuka, Kanagawa
- Team principal(s): Eiji Tatsumi
- Current series: Super GT
- Former series: JGTC
- Current drivers: Takuto Iguchi, Hideki Yamauchi
- Teams' Championships: 1 (GT300, 2021)
- Drivers' Championships: 1 (GT300, 2021)
- Website: www.rdsport.net

R&D Sport is a Japanese racing team currently competing in the Super GT series.

== Racing history ==
R&D Sport was created in 1991 as a race car management, maintenance, and manufacturing company and expanded to JGTC, racing under the company's own name in 2002.

=== Super Formula ===
The team first competed in Japanese Formula 3000 in 1992 as AD Racing with Finnish driver Mika Salo. The team changed to Navi Connection Racing in 1995 with driver Masahiko Kageyama taking third place at Suzuka in 1995 and third place at Fuji in 1996. Masami Kageyama, younger brother of Masahiko Kageyama, followed his sibling to third place at Fuji in 1997. A third-place finish at Fuji in 2000 from driver Shinsuke Shibahara would be R&D Sports' last podium in Formula Nippon.

=== Super GT ===
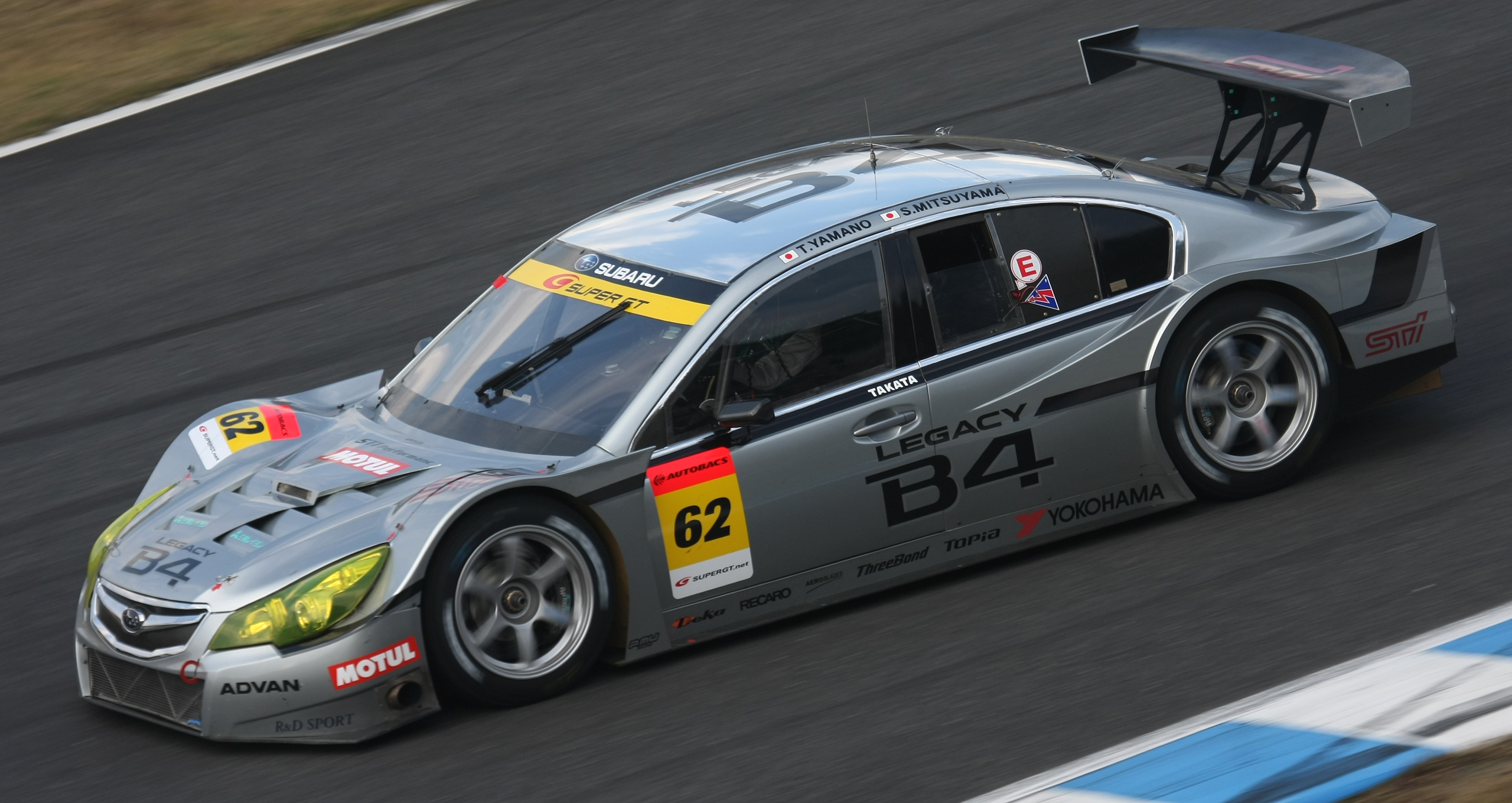
The #62 R&D Sport Subaru Legacy B4 at Twin Ring Motegi in 2009

In 2001 R&D Sport moved to the JGTC in a Porsche 911 GT3 R driven by Shinsuke Shibahara and Shogo Mitsuyama. 2002 would be the first successful year of JGTC competition, changing to a new Vemac RD320R, Shibahara and Mitsuyama would win three rounds of the season, taking victory at Fuji, Twin Ring Motegi, and Mine Circuit and finishing second in the drivers' championship.

R&D moved to GT500 with a Vemac RD350R in 2003, but they would not have the success of the last season, being unable to properly compete with the factory teams of GT500. As a result, the team dedicated 2004 to further developing their new Vemac RD408R competing in only one race of the season.

2005 would see the team move back to the GT300 class, as an accident with the team's RD408R ruined the planned GT500 effort. Instead R&D Sport was forced to use their Vemac RD350R from the 2003 season in the GT300 class, as it was no longer competitive in GT500. The team ran two cars in 2006 with Shogo Mitsuyama and Nobuteru Taniguchi winning at Okayama and taking third in the drivers' championship. Drivers Shinsuke Shibahara and Hiroyuki Yagi won the next round at Fuji and finished sixth in the drivers championship.

Shinsuke Shibahara and Haruki Kurosawa achieved victory at Autopolis in 2007, finishing third in the drivers' championship.

R&D Sport began a partnership with Subaru in 2009 using an AWD Subaru Legacy B4 that debuted at the sixth round of the season at Suzuka. However the car developed problems with its front differential and was retired from the race.

2010 was a shift from the disappointing performance of the Legacy in 2009, by changing the car from an AWD setup to FR, Kota Sasaki and Tetsuya Yamano won at Suzuka. 2011 was an even better performance, with Sasaki and Yamano winning at both Suzuka and Autopolis, finishing fourth overall in the drivers' championship.

STI and R&D Sport began a joint partnership in 2012 with STI general director Eiji Tatsumi taking over as team principal and a new Subaru BRZ for the 2012 season.

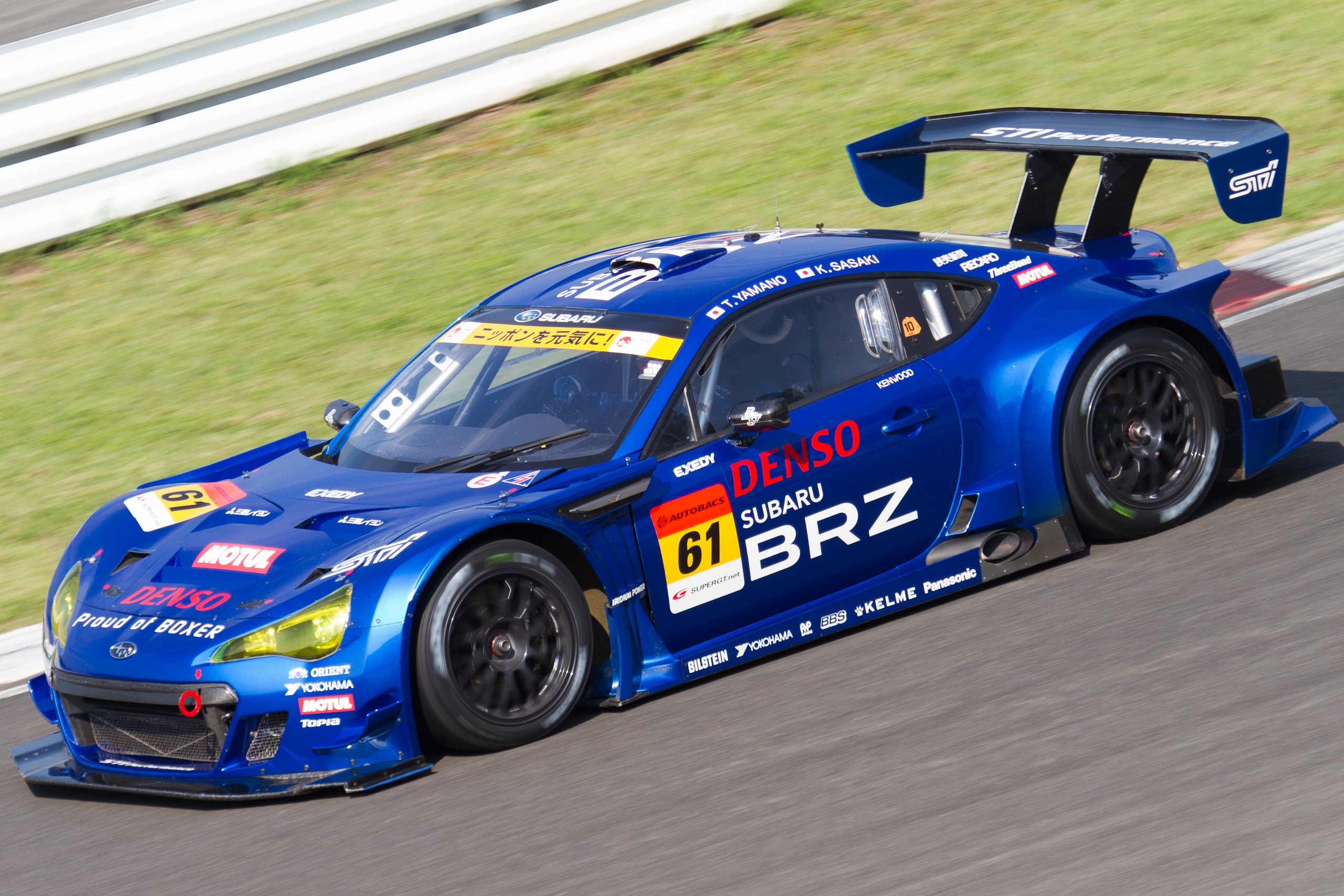
The #61 R&D Sport Subaru BRZ at Sportsland SUGO in 2012

In 2013 the team achieved victory at the fifth round of the season at Suzuka, with drivers Kota Sasaki and Tetsuya Yamano finishing fourth in the drivers' championship. At the eighth round of the series Tetsuya Yamano announced his retirement after the end of the 2013 season.

Yamano's replacement, Takuto Iguchi and Kota Sasaki won at Fuji and finished 5th in the drivers' championship in 2014.

The 2021 season saw R&D sport win the Super GT championship with drivers Takuto Iguchi and Hideki Yamauchi, despite only winning one race.

== Results ==
=== Complete JGTC Results ===
(key) (Races in bold indicate pole position) (Races in italics indicate fastest lap)

Year	Car	Tyres	Class	No.	Drivers	1	2	3	4	5	6	7	8	9	Pos	Pts
2001	Porsche 911 GT3-R	D	GT300	62	(Japan) Shinsuke Shibahara (Japan) Yasuhisa Fujiwara (Japan) Shogo Mitsuyama	OKA; 7	FUJ; Ret	SUG; 9	NC1; 10	FUJ; 11	MOT; 5	SUZ; 6	MIN; 4		7th	39
2001	Porsche 911 GT3-R	D	GT300	63	(Japan) "OSAMU" (Japan) Takamasa Nakagawa	OKA; 9	FUJ; 8	SUG; 6	NC1	FUJ; 17	MOT; 17	SUZ; 5	MIN; 7		7th	39
2002	Porsche 911 GT3-R	D	GT300	61	(Japan) Yasuo Miyagawa (Japan) Hiroaki Suga (Japan) Tsubasa Kurosawa (Japan) Atsushi Katsumasa	OKA; 20	FUJ; 10	SUG; DNA	SEP; 17	FUJ; 21	MOT	MIN	SUZ		17th	1
2002	Porsche 911 GT3-R	D	GT300	62	(Japan) Shinsuke Shibahara (Japan) Shogo Mitsuyama	OKA; Ret									2nd	85
2002	Vemac RD320R	D	GT300	62	(Japan) Shinsuke Shibahara (Japan) Shogo Mitsuyama		**FUJ**; 1	SUG; 15	SEP; Ret	**FUJ**; 13	**MOT**; 1	MIN; 1	SUZ; 7		2nd	85
2002	Porsche 911 GT3-R	D	GT300	63	(Japan) "OSAMU" (Japan) Takamasa Nakagawa	OKA; 17	FUJ; Ret	SUG; 3	SEP; 15	FUJ; 17	MOT; 13	MIN; 10	SUZ; DNS		2nd	85
2003	Porsche 911 GT3-R	D	GT300	61	(Japan) Atsushi Katsumata (Japan) Takeyuki Kishi (Japan) Keiko Ihara	OKA	FUJ; Ret	SUG; DNP	FUJ	FUJ; 16	MOT; 12	AUT	SUZ		NC	0
2003	Vemac RD350R	D	GT500	62	(Japan) Shinsuke Shibahara (Japan) Shogo Mitsuyama	OKA	FUJ; 11	SUG; 15	FUJ; 9	FUJ; Ret	MOT; Ret	AUT	SUZ; 16		14th	2
2004	Vemac RD408R	D	GT500	62	(Japan) Shinsuke Shibahara (Japan) Shogo Mitsuyama	OKA	SUG	SEP	TOK	MOT	AUT	SUZ; 13	NC1	NC2	NC	0

=== Complete Super GT Results ===
(key) (Races in bold indicate pole position) (Races in italics indicate fastest lap)

Year	Car	Tyres	Class	No.	Drivers	1	2	3	4	5	6	7	8	9	10	Pos	Points
2005	Vemac RD350R	Y	GT300	62	(Japan) Shinsuke Shibahara (Japan) Tadao Uematsu (Japan) Hiroyuki Yagi	OKA; Ret	FUJ; 8	SEP; 11	SUG; Ret	MOT; 10	FUJ; DSQ	AUT; 16	SUZ; 22			13th	6
2006	Vemac RD320R	Y	GT300	61	(Japan) Shogo Mitsuyama (Japan) Nobuteru Taniguchi	SUZ	OKA	FUJ	SEP	SUG	SUZ	MOT; 6	AUT; 20	FUJ; 13		22nd	5
2006	Vemac RD408R	Y	GT300	62	(Japan) Shinsuke Shibahara (Japan) Hiroyuki Yagi (Japan) Haruki Kurosawa	SUZ; 18	OKA; 7	FUJ; 1	SEP; 13	SUG; Ret	SUZ; 7	**MOT**; 3	AUT; 6	FUJ; 14		5th	49
2007	Vemac RD408R	Y	GT300	62	(Japan) Shinsuke Shibahara (Japan) Haruki Kurosawa	SUZ; 5	OKA; 8	FUJ; Ret	SEP; 14	SUG; 5	SUZ; 3	MOT; 2	AUT; 1	FUJ; 4		3rd	91
2008	Vemac RD408R	Y	GT300	62	(Japan) Shinsuke Shibahara (Japan) Haruki Kurosawa (Japan) Shogo Mitsuyama	SUZ; DNS	OKA; 5	FUJ; 6	SEP; 8	SUG; 11	SUZ; 4	MOT; 12	AUT; 14	FUJ; 2		9th	56
2009	Subaru Legacy B4	Y	GT300	62	(Japan) Shogo Mitsuyama (Japan) Tetsuya Yamano	OKA	SUZ	FUJ	SEP	SUG	SUZ; DNS	FUJ; 18	AUT	MOT; Ret		25th	1
2010	Subaru Legacy B4	Y	GT300	62	(Japan) Kota Sasaki (Japan) Tetsuya Yamano	SUZ; 13	OKA; 12	FUJ; Ret	SEP	SUG; 13	SUZ; 1	FUJ; C	MOT; 10	NC1; 17	NC2; 15	11th	30
2011	Subaru Legacy B4	Y	GT300	62	(Japan) Kota Sasaki (Japan) Tetsuya Yamano	OKA; 18	FUJ; 8	SEP; 8	SUG; Ret	SUZ; 1	FUJ; 6	**AUT**; 1	MOT; 6	NC1; 14	NC2; 5	4th	75
2012	Subaru BRZ	Y	GT300	61	(Japan) Kota Sasaki (Japan) Tetsuya Yamano	OKA; Ret	FUJ; 9	SEP; 8	SUG; 10	SUZ; Ret	FUJ; 6	AUT; 4	MOT; 15	NC1; 19	NC2; 16	12th	33
2013	Subaru BRZ	M	GT300	61	(Japan) Kota Sasaki (Japan) Tetsuya Yamano (Japan) Takuto Iguchi	**OKA**; 5	**FUJ**; Ret	SEP; 4	**SUG**; 6	**SUZ**; 1	FUJ; 9	AUT; 7	**MOT**; 3	NC1; Ret	NC2; 22	4th	87
2014	Subaru BRZ	M	GT300	61	(Japan) Kota Sasaki (Japan) Takuto Iguchi	OKA; 21	FUJ; 12	**AUT**; 2	SUG; 14	FUJ; 1	**SUZ**; 9	BUR; 5	MOT; 17			6th	60
2015	Subaru BRZ	D	GT300	61	(Japan) Takuto Iguchi (Japan) Hideki Yamauchi	OKA; 17	FUJ; 8	CHA; 6	FUJ; 8	SUZ; 3	SUG; 5	AUT; Ret	MOT; 11			10th	49
2016	Subaru BRZ	D	GT300	61	(Japan) Takuto Iguchi (Japan) Hideki Yamauchi	OKA; 23	FUJ; 11	SUG; 3	FUJ; 3	SUZ; 1	CHA; Ret	MOT; 23	MOT; 13			6th	62
2017	Subaru BRZ	D	GT300	61	(Japan) Takuto Iguchi (Japan) Hideki Yamauchi	OKA; Ret	FUJ; 13	AUT; 2	SUG; 9	FUJ; 4	SUZ; 7	CHA; Ret	MOT; Ret			9th	45
2018	Subaru BRZ	D	GT300	61	(Japan) Takuto Iguchi (Japan) Hideki Yamauchi	OKA; 18	FUJ; Ret	SUZ; 3	CHA; Ret	FUJ; Ret	**SUG**; 1	AUT; 15	MOT; 6			11th	49
2019	Subaru BRZ	D	GT300	61	(Japan) Takuto Iguchi (Japan) Hideki Yamauchi	OKA; 4	FUJ; 28	SUZ; 3	BUR; 11	FUJ; 10	AUT; Ret	**SUG**; 28	MOT; 12	NC1	NC2	13th	34
2020	Subaru BRZ	D	GT300	61	(Japan) Takuto Iguchi (Japan) Hideki Yamauchi	FUJ; Ret	FUJ; 2	SUZ; 4	MOT; 3	FUJ; 16	SUZ; 12	MOT; 5	FUJ; 8			6th	64
2021	Subaru BRZ	D	GT300	61	(Japan) Takuto Iguchi (Japan) Hideki Yamauchi	OKA; 15	**FUJ**; 2	MOT; 11	**SUZ**; 10	**SUG**; 1	AUT; 3	MOT; 6	**FUJ**; 3			1st	87
2022	Subaru BRZ	D	GT300	61	(Japan) Takuto Iguchi (Japan) Hideki Yamauchi	**OKA**; 9	FUJ; 3	**SUZ**; 12	FUJ; 1	SUZ; 18	**SUG**; 8	**AUT**; 2	MOT; 20			3rd	68
2023	Subaru BRZ	D	GT300	61	(Japan) Takuto Iguchi (Japan) Hideki Yamauchi	OKA; 22	FUJ; 11	**SUZ**; 6	FUJ; 6	**SUZ**; 3	SUG; 4	AUT; 4	MOT; 10			7th	59
2024	Subaru BRZ	D	GT300	61	(Japan) Takuto Iguchi (Japan) Hideki Yamauchi	OKA; 26†	FUJ; 15	SUZ; Ret	FUJ; 24	SUG; 5	AUT; 25†	MOT; Ret	SUZ; 7			17th	20
2025	Subaru BRZ	D	GT300	61	(Japan) Takuto Iguchi (Japan) Hideki Yamauchi	OKA; 13	FUJ; 8	SEP; 8	FS1; 8	FS2; Ret	**SUZ**; 2	SUG; 22†	AUT; 24†	**MOT**; 2		9th	81.5

Note: Non-championship (NC1, NC2) races are major races that do not count towards the championship.

=== Super Formula (Formula Nippon, Japanese Formula 3000) ===
Year	Team	Chassis	Engine	Drivers	Drivers' rankings
1992	AD Racing	Reynard 92D	Mugen Honda	(Finland) Mika Salo	14th
1993	AD Racing	Lola T93/50	Mugen Honda	(Finland) Mika Salo	17th
1995	NAVI CONNECTION	Reynard	Mugen Honda	(Japan) Masahiko Kageyama / (Japan) Masahiko Kondo	17th
1996	NAVI CONNECTION	Reynard	Mugen Honda	(Japan) Masahiko Kageyama / (Japan) Masahiko Kondo	15th
1997	NAVI CONNECTION	Reynard	Mugen Honda	(Japan) Masami Kageyama / (Japan) Katsumi Yamamoto	5th
1998	Team LeyJun	Reynard	Mugen Honda	(Japan) Shinsuke Shibahara / (Japan) Osamu / (Japan) Taichiro Oonishi	24th
1999	Team LeyJun	Reynard 99L	Mugen Honda	(United Kingdom) Peter Dumbreck / (Japan) Osamu / (Japan) Shinsuke Shibahara	7th
2000	Team LeyJun	Reynard 2KL	Mugen Honda	(Japan) Shinsuke Shibahara / (Japan) Osamu	11th
2000	TAKAGI B-1	Reynard 99L	Mugen Honda	(Japan) Tetsuji Tamanaka	19th
2001	TAKAGI B-1	Reynard 2KL	Mugen Honda	(Japan) Tetsuji Tamanaka / (Japan) Masahiko Kageyama	18th
