= Yuji Ide =

Japanese racing driver (born 1975)

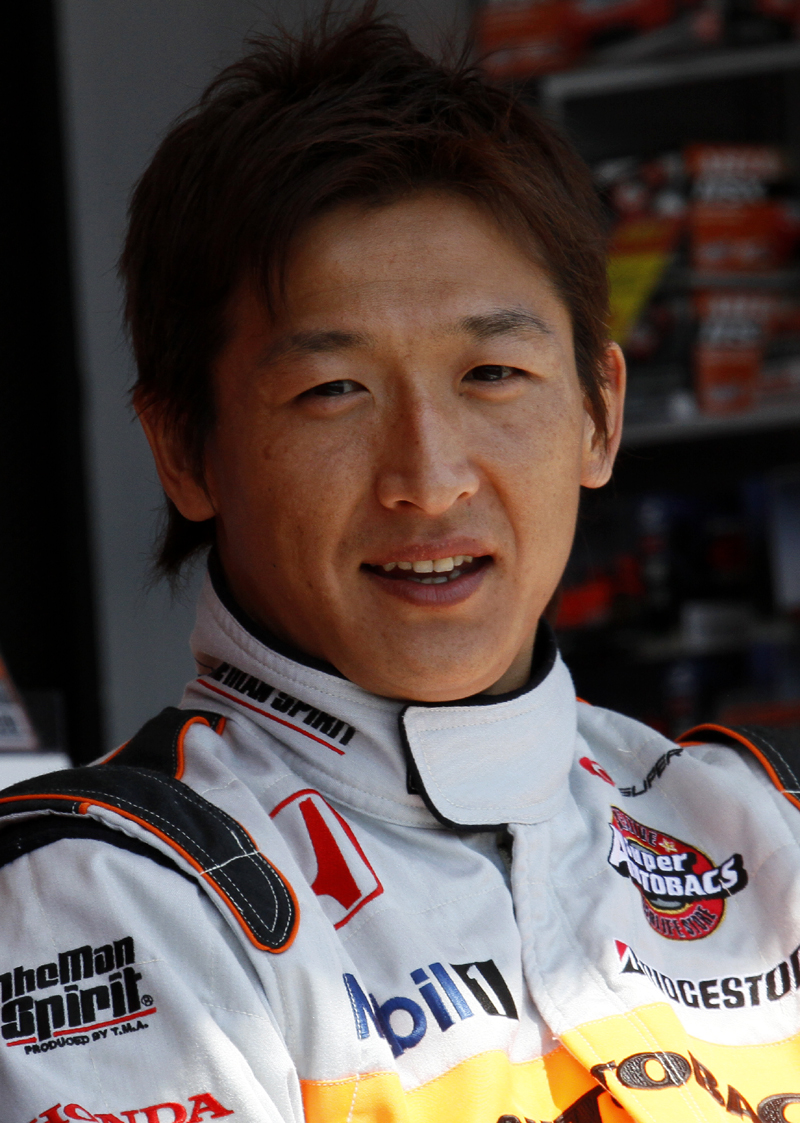
- Ide in 2010
- Born: 21 January 1975 (age 51); Saitama, Saitama, Japan

Formula One World Championship career
- Nationality: (Japan) Japanese
- Active years: 2006
- Team: Super Aguri
- Entries: 4
- Championships: 0
- Wins: 0
- Podiums: 0
- Career points: 0
- Pole positions: 0
- Fastest laps: 0
- First entry: 2006 Bahrain Grand Prix
- Last entry: 2006 San Marino Grand Prix

Yuji Ide (井出有治, Ide Yūji) (born 21 January 1975) is a Japanese racing driver. He is the 2005 Formula Nippon runner-up and the 2010 Suzuka 1000km winner. He competed in Formula One with the Super Aguri team in 2006, but was demoted to third driver after four races and subsequently lost his FIA Super Licence.

== Early career ==
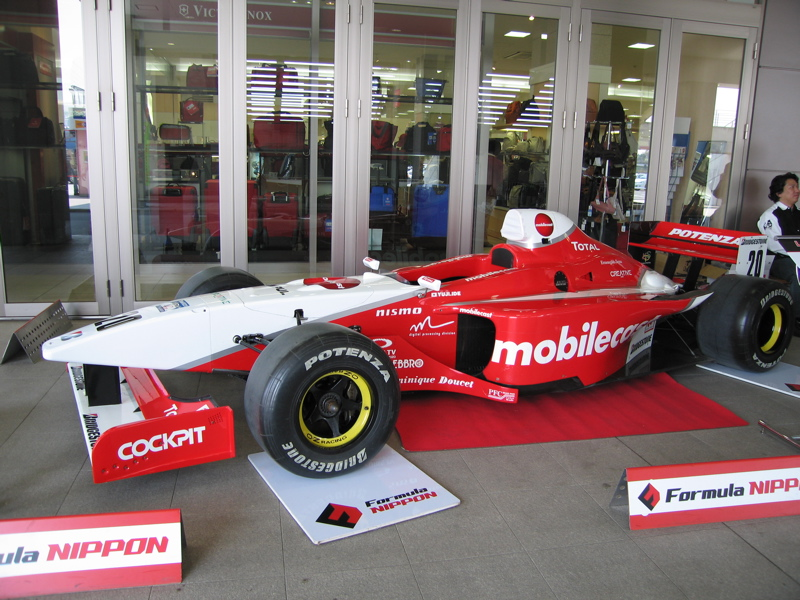
Ide's 2005 Formula Nippon Lola

Born in Saitama, Saitama, Ide started his racing career in 1990 with kart racing. In 1991, he won the Kantou National Cup Kart Championship. In 1992, he was second in the Regional Kart Championship East Kantou series A1 Class and also won the Japan Kart Grand Prix SS stock class National GP. The following year, he joined the All-Japan Kart Championship Series Formula A Class before progressing to the All-Japan Formula Three Championship.

In 1999, Ide came second in the All Japan GT Championship GT300 Class Series. He was also the Formula Dream series champion in Japan. In 2002, Ide joined the French Formula Three Championship series and finished in seventh place. The following year, 2003, he joined the All Japan Championship Formula Nippon Series and also finished seventh. In 2004, he claimed third spot before going on to win the Super Endurance Race Class 3 Series. He finished his first stint in Formula Nippon finishing second in the 2005 championship.

== Formula One ==
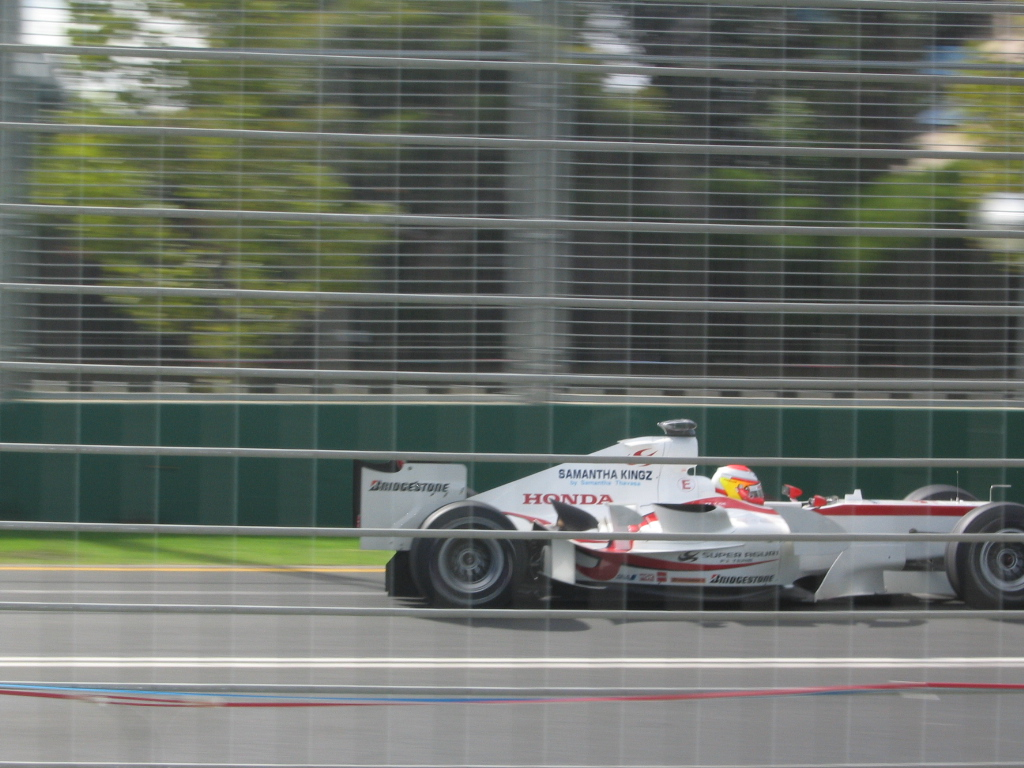
Ide driving the Super Aguri SA05 at the 2006 Australian Grand Prix

At age 31, Ide became one of Formula One's oldest rookies when he landed a seat at Super Aguri for the 2006 season, in part due to Super Aguri's aspiration of fielding an all-Japanese team. Ide had known Aguri Suzuki for a long time, according to a press release, however Ide's meshing with the team had some issues with his lack of proficient English.

In his debut race in Bahrain, Ide was significantly behind his more experienced teammate Takuma Sato and failed to finish. At the next race in Malaysia, he retired after 33 laps.

During qualifying at the Australian Grand Prix, Ide was blamed for blocking Rubens Barrichello during his qualifying lap, causing the Brazilian to be stuck in the first round of qualifying and start 16th on the grid. Ide finished 13th in the race, two laps down. His weekend in Melbourne was notable for a number of spins, and team principal Aguri Suzuki subsequently suggested Ide's seat was not safe if his performances did not improve.

At Imola, Ide caused a first lap crash with Christijan Albers that put the Dutchman into a series of rolls which ended with Albers's car upside down. Ide was reprimanded by the stewards and warned over future conduct. Aguri Suzuki said "He didn't have enough testing because he doesn't understand how to use the car".

On 4 May 2006, Super Aguri announced that Ide would be dropped from the upcoming European Grand Prix at the Nürburgring, following advice from the FIA that he needed more experience. He was replaced by the team's third driver Franck Montagny. Ide was demoted to Montagny's seat as third driver.

On 10 May 2006, the FIA revoked Ide's FIA Super Licence meaning he could no longer compete in F1 during the 2006 season. A statement from Super Aguri said that "Aguri Suzuki and A.Company (Japan) shall continue to seek driving opportunities for Yuji and hopefully a path back into Formula One".

=== Summary ===
Overall during Ide's four-race F1 career, he finished once – a 13th place at the 2006 Australian Grand Prix. His best qualifying effort was 21st of 22 cars at his debut at Bahrain, where the 22nd starter, Kimi Räikkönen, did not complete a qualifying attempt. Super Aguri team principal Aguri Suzuki revealed that Ide had just 200 kilometres of experience in an F1 car before his debut.

In the November 2009 issue of F1 Racing Magazine, Ide was named as one of the five worst F1 drivers in history. However, in December 2020 The Race noted that he was "a more capable driver than he was made to appear", with his brief F1 spell hampered by little testing, a language barrier and driving "very much the second car" of the new Super Aguri team.

== Return to Japan ==
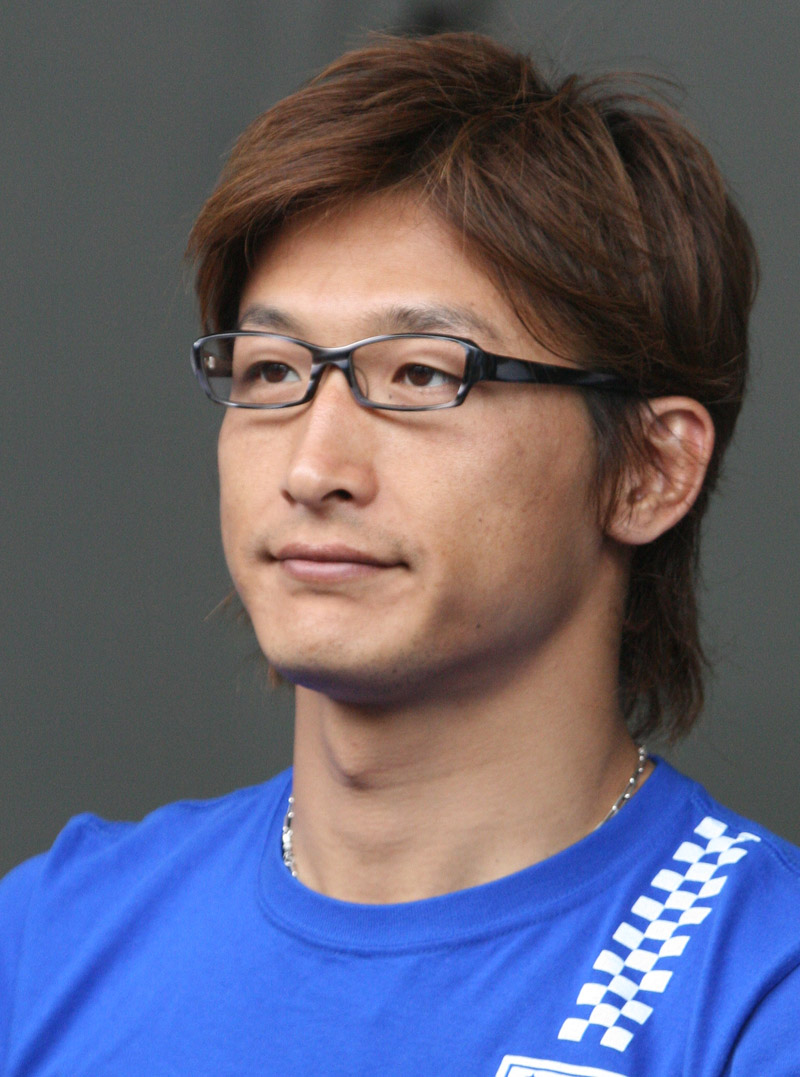
Ide in 2008

In July 2006, it was announced that Ide would be racing for Team Dandelion Racing in the final six rounds of the Formula Nippon championship, with the aim of increasing his racing experience.

Ide contested the International Pokka 1000km round of the 2006 Super GT Series at Suzuka with Nismo in the No. 23 Nissan. During the race, he was penalized after making contact with the No. 55 car of Hidetoshi Mitsusada; Ide ignored the black flag, resulting in his team's disqualification from the race.

In 2007, Ide remained in Formula Nippon with the Autobacs Racing Team Aguri (ARTA) team, which is owned by Aguri Suzuki. His best finish of the season was a third place, scored in round five at Suzuka. Ide also raced as a third driver for ARTA in the 2007 International Pokka 1000km, where the team finished second overall, despite a large success ballast weight handicap.

Ide raced as a full-time driver in Super GT for Team Kunimitsu in 2008 and 2009, and then for ARTA in 2010. He notably won the 2010 Pokka GT Summer Special and finished second at the 2008 event. He also raced full-time in Formula Nippon in 2008 and 2010, but scored points just three times.

== Racing record ==
=== Career summary ===
| Season | Series | Team name | Races | Wins | Poles | Points | Position |
|---|---|---|---|---|---|---|---|
| 1994 | All-Japan Formula 3 Championship | Active | 6 | 0 | 0 | 0 | NC |
| 1994 | All-Japan Formula 3 Championship | Asada Racing | 6 | 0 | 0 | 0 | NC |
| 1996 | All-Japan GT Championship - GT300 | Hoshino Racing | 1 | 0 | 0 | 0 | NC |
| 1997 | All-Japan Formula 3 Championship | Asada Racing | 2 | 0 | 0 | 0 | NC |
| 1998 | All-Japan Formula 3 Championship | Now Motorsports | 7 | 0 | 0 | 0 | NC |
| 1999 | All-Japan GT Championship - GT300 | ARTA - NISMO | 6 | 3 | 4 | 72 | **2nd** |
| 1999 | Formula Dream | 5ZIGEN ARTA | ? | 1 | ? | ? | **1st** |
| 2000 | All-Japan Formula 3 Championship | Mugen Dome Project | 10 | 2 | 1 | 35 | **2nd** |
| 2000 | Macau Grand Prix | Skill Speed | 1 | 0 | 0 | N/A | 24th |
| 2000 | Korea Super Prix | Skill Speed | 1 | 0 | 0 | N/A | 13th |
| 2000 | All-Japan GT Championship | NISMO | 1 | 0 | 0 | 6 | 22nd |
| 2001 | All-Japan Formula 3 Championship | Three Bond Racing | 18 | 0 | 0 | 100 | 5th |
| 2001 | All-Japan GT Championship - GT300 | Hasemi Motorsport | 7 | 0 | 0 | 53 | 4th |
| 2001 | Macau Grand Prix | Signature Team | 1 | 0 | 0 | N/A | 5th |
| 2001 | Korea Super Prix | Signature Team | 1 | 0 | 0 | N/A | 12th |
| 2002 | French Formula 3 Championship | Autobacs Racing Team Aguri | 14 | 1 | 0 | 84 | 7th |
| 2002 | European Formula 3 Cup | Autobacs Racing Team Aguri | 1 | 0 | 0 | N/A | 6th |
| 2002 | Macau Grand Prix | Autobacs Racing Team Aguri | 1 | 0 | 0 | N/A | NC |
| 2002 | Masters of Formula 3 | Autobacs Racing Team Aguri | 1 | 0 | 0 | N/A | 25th |
| 2002 | Korea Super Prix | Autobacs Racing Team Aguri | 1 | 0 | 0 | N/A | 10th |
| 2003 | Formula Nippon | Racing Team Cerumo | 10 | 0 | 0 | 19 | 7th |
| 2003 | All-Japan GT Championship | Team Impul | 8 | 2 | 0 | 64 | 7th |
| 2004 | Formula Nippon | Team Impul | 9 | 1 | 1 | 32 | **3rd** |
| 2004 | All-Japan GT Championship | Team Impul | 7 | 1 | 1 | 35 | 11th |
| 2005 | Formula Nippon | Team Impul | 9 | 2 | 1 | 39 | **2nd** |
| 2005 | Super GT | Team Impul | 8 | 0 | 1 | 35 | 11th |
| 2006 | Formula One | Super Aguri | 4 | 0 | 0 | 0 | 25th |
| 2006 | Formula Nippon | Team Dandelion Racing | 6 | 0 | 0 | 0 | NC |
| 2006 | Super GT | NISMO | 1 | 0 | 0 | 0 | NC |
| 2007 | Formula Nippon | Autobacs Racing Team Aguri | 9 | 0 | 0 | 6 | 13th |
| 2007 | Super GT | Autobacs Racing Team Aguri | 1 | 0 | 0 | 15 | 18th |
| 2008 | Formula Nippon | Autobacs Racing Team Aguri | 11 | 0 | 0 | 2 | 19th |
| 2008 | Super GT | Team Kunimitsu | 9 | 0 | 0 | 41 | 11th |
| 2009 | Super GT | Team Kunimitsu | 9 | 0 | 0 | 29 | 13th |
| 2010 | Formula Nippon | Motul Team | 8 | 0 | 0 | 1 | 14th |
| 2010 | Super GT | Autobacs Racing Team Aguri | 7 | 1 | 0 | 29 | 11th |
| 2013 | Super GT - GT300 | Bonds Racing | 1 | 0 | 0 | 6 | 22nd |
| 2015 | Super GT - GT300 | Team Up Garage with Bandoh | 6 | 0 | 0 | 2 | 25th |
| 2017 | Super GT - GT300 | EIcars Bentley TTO | 6 | 0 | 0 | 0 | NC |
| 2017 | Superrace Championship - Super 6000 | Ecsta Racing Team | 8 | 4 | 5 | 127 | **2nd** |
| 2018 | Super GT - GT300 | EIcars Bentley | 7 | 0 | 0 | 0 | NC |
| 2018 | Superrace Championship - Super 6000 | Ecsta Racing Team | 9 | 1 | 0 | 116 | **3rd** |
| 2020 | Super Taikyu - ST-TCR | Floral Racing with Uematsu | 5 | 2 | 1 | 194‡ | **1st‡** |
| 2021 | Super Taikyu - ST-X | Floral Racing with ABSSA | 4 | 0 | 1 | 108.5‡ | **2nd‡** |
| 2022 | Super GT - GT300 | Busou Drago Corse | 3 | 0 | 0 | 12.5 | 20th |

‡ Team standings.

=== Complete Japanese Formula 3 results ===
(key) (Races in bold indicate pole position) (Races in italics indicate fastest lap)

| Year | Team | Engine | Class | 1 | 2 | 3 | 4 | 5 | 6 | 7 | 8 | 9 | 10 | 11 | 12 | 13 | 14 | 15 | 16 | 17 | 18 | 19 | DC | Pts |
|---|---|---|---|---|---|---|---|---|---|---|---|---|---|---|---|---|---|---|---|---|---|---|---|---|
| 1994 | Active | Toyota | | SUZ; 14 | FUJ; Ret | TSU; 17 | SUZ; Ret | SEN; 20 | TOK | MIN | TAI | SUG | | | | | | | | | | | NC | 0 |
| 1994 | Asada Racing | Mugen | | | | | | | | | | | SUZ; 10 | | | | | | | | | | NC | 0 |
| 1995 | Asada Racing | Mugen | J | SUZ; 12 | TSU; 12 | MIN | SUZ; Ret | TAI; Ret | SUG | FUJ; 14 | SUZ; 10 | SEN; 11 | | | | | | | | | | | 4th | 22 |
| 1997 | Asada Racing | Mugen | | SUZ; Ret | TSU; Ret | MIN | FUJ | SUZ | SUG | SEN | MOT | FUJ | SUZ | | | | | | | | | | NC | 0 |
| 1998 | Now Motorsports | Toyota | | SUZ; 9 | TSU; 10 | MIN; 16 | FUJ; 16 | MOT; Ret | SUZ; 19 | SUG; 13 | TAI | SEN | SUG | | | | | | | | | | NC | 0 |
| 2000 | Mugen × Dome Project | Mugen | | SUZ; Ret | **TSU**; 1 | FUJ; 6 | MIN; 3 | TAI; 6 | SUZ; 2 | SUG; 5 | MOT; 3 | SEN; 6 | SUZ; 1 | | | | | | | | | | 2nd | 35 |
| 2001 | Three Bond Racing | Three Bond | | SUZ; 1 Ret | SUZ; 2; 4 | TSU; 1; 7 | TSU; 2; 7 | FUJ; 1; 5 | FUJ; 2 Ret | MIN; 1; 4 | MIN; 2; 3 | MOT; 1 Ret | MOT; 2; 5 | SUZ; 5 | SUG; 1; 5 | SUG; 2; 5 | SEN; 1; 6 | SEN; 2; 6 | TAI; 1; 5 | TAI; 2; 8 | MOT; 1; 8 | MOT; 2; 8 | 5th | 100 |

=== Complete French Formula Three Championship results ===
(key) (Races in bold indicate pole position) (Races in italics indicate fastest lap)

| Year | Team | Chassis | Engine | Class | 1 | 2 | 3 | 4 | 5 | 6 | 7 | 8 | 9 | 10 | 11 | 12 | 13 | 14 | DC | Pts |
|---|---|---|---|---|---|---|---|---|---|---|---|---|---|---|---|---|---|---|---|---|
| 2002 | ARTA/Signature | Dallara F302 | Renault | A | NOG; 1; 9 | NOG; 2; 4 | LÉD; 1; 5 | LÉD; 2; 3 | DIJ; 1; 8 | DIJ; 2; 8 | CRT; 1; 2 | CRT; 2; 1 | ALB; 1 Ret | ALB; 2; 8 | LMS; 1; 8 | LMS; 2 Ret | MAG; 1; 13 | MAG; 2; 12 | 7th | 84 |

=== Complete Formula Nippon results ===
(key) (Races in bold indicate pole position) (Races in italics indicate fastest lap)

| Year | Entrant | 1 | 2 | 3 | 4 | 5 | 6 | 7 | 8 | 9 | 10 | 11 | DC | Points |
|---|---|---|---|---|---|---|---|---|---|---|---|---|---|---|
| 2003 | Team Cerumo | SUZ; 4 | FUJ; 7 | MIN; 3 | MOT; 2 | SUZ; 7 | SUG; 10 | FUJ; Ret | MIN; 3 | MOT; 12 | SUZ; 5 | | 7th | 19 |
| 2004 | Team Impul | **SUZ**; 12 | SUG; 2 | MOT; 2 | SUZ; 3 | SUG; 7 | MIN; 7 | SEP; 10 | MOT; 1 | SUZ; 2 | | | **3rd** | **32** |
| 2005 | Team Impul | **MOT**; 2 | SUZ; 1 | SUG; 5 | FUJ; 7 | SUZ; 8 | MIN; 1 | FUJ; 3 | MOT; 4 | SUZ; 3 | | | **2nd** | **39** |
| 2006 | Dandelion Racing | FUJ | SUZ | MOT | SUZ; 12 | AUT; 12 | FUJ; 11 | SUG; Ret | MOT; Ret | SUZ; 10 | | | 21st | 0 |
| 2007 | Autobacs Racing Team Aguri | FUJ; 14 | SUZ; 10 | MOT; 16 | OKA; Ret | SUZ; 3 | FUJ; 16 | SUG; Ret | MOT; Ret | SUZ; 9 | | | 13th | 6 |
| 2008 | Autobacs Racing Team Aguri | FUJ; 9 | SUZ; 18 | MOT; 15 | OKA; Ret | SUZ; 15 | SUZ; Ret | MOT; 12 | MOT; Ret | FUJ; Ret | FUJ; 19 | SUG; 17 | 19th | 2 |
| 2010 | Motul Team Mugen | SUZ; 9 | MOT; 9 | FUJ; 10 | MOT; 9 | SUG; 9 | AUT; DNS | SUZ; 8 | SUZ; 8 | | | | 14th | 1 |

=== Complete Super GT results ===
| Year | Team | Car | Class | 1 | 2 | 3 | 4 | 5 | 6 | 7 | 8 | 9 | DC | Points |
|---|---|---|---|---|---|---|---|---|---|---|---|---|---|---|
| 1999 | ARTA-NISMO | Nissan Silvia | GT300 | SUZ; 9 | FUJ; Ret | SUG; 1 | MIN; 1 | FUJ; Ret | TAI; 1 | MOT; 4 | | | **2nd** | **72** |
| 2000 | NISMO | Nissan Skyline GT-R | GT500 | MOT; 6 | FUJ | SUG | FUJ | TAI | MIN | SUZ | | | 22nd | 6 |
| 2001 | Hasemi Motorsport | Nissan Silvia | GT300 | TAI; 6 | FUJ; 2 | SUG; 12 | FUJ; 2 | MOT; 9 | SUZ; 2 | MIN; 12 | | | 4th | 53 |
| 2003 | Impul | Nissan Skyline GT-R | GT500 | TAI; 12 | FUJ; 2 | SUG; Ret | FUJ; 1 | FUJ; 16 | MOT; 6 | AUT; 11 | SUZ; 1 | | 4th | 64 |
| 2004 | Impul | Nissan Z | GT500 | TAI; 8 | SUG; 10 | SEP; Ret | TOK; 11 | MOT; Ret | AUT; 5 | SUZ; 1 | | | 11th | 35 |
| 2005 | Impul | Nissan Z | GT500 | OKA; Ret | FUJ; 15 | SEP; 8 | SUG; 5 | MOT; 3 | FUJ; 13 | AUT; 4 | SUZ; 9 | | 11th | 35 |
| 2006 | NISMO | Nissan Z | GT500 | SUZ | OKA | FUJ | SEP | SUG | SUZ; DSQ | MOT | AUT | FUJ | NC | 0 |
| 2007 | Autobacs Racing Team Aguri | Honda NSX | GT500 | SUZ | OKA | FUJ | SEP | SUG | SUZ; 2 | MOT | AUT | FUJ | 18th | 15 |
| 2008 | Team Kunimitsu | Honda NSX | GT500 | SUZ; 13 | OKA; 9 | FUJ; 4 | SEP; 5 | SUG; 5 | SUZ; 2 | MOT; 16 | AUT; 9 | FUJ; Ret | 11th | 41 |
| 2009 | Team Kunimitsu | Honda NSX | GT500 | OKA; 8 | SUZ; 12 | FUJ; 11 | SEP; 4 | SUG; 4 | SUZ; 9 | FUJ; 12 | AUT; 6 | MOT; 8 | 13th | 29 |
| 2010 | Autobacs Racing Team Aguri | Honda HSV-010 GT | GT500 | SUZ; Ret | OKA; 6 | FUJ; 11 | SEP; 11 | SUG; 12 | SUZ; 1 | FUJ; C | MOT; 7 | | 11th | 29 |
| 2013 | Bonds Racing | Nissan GT-R GT3 | GT300 | OKA | FUJ; 5 | SEP | SUG | SUZ | FUJ | FUJ | AUT | MOT | 22nd | 6 |
| 2015 | Team Up Garage with Bandoh | Toyota 86 | GT300 | OKA; 19 | FUJ; Ret | CHA; Ret | FUJ; Ret | SUZ | SUG | AUT; 9 | MOT; Ret | | 25th | 2 |
| 2017 | EIcars Bentley TTO | Bentley Continental GT3 | GT300 | OKA; 20 | FUJ; 16 | AUT; 19 | SUG | FUJ; 18 | SUZ; Ret | CHA | MOT; 22 | | 35th | 0 |
| 2018 | EIcars Bentley | Bentley Continental GT3 | GT300 | OKA; 21 | FUJ; 22 | SUZ; 18 | CHA | FUJ; 13 | SUG; 15 | AUT; 18 | MOT; 19 | | 32nd | 0 |
| 2022 | BUSOU Drago Corse | Nissan GT-R Nismo GT3 | GT300 | OKA; 11 | FUJ; 2‡ | SUZ; 6 | FUJ | SUZ | SUG | AUT | MOT | | 20th | 12.5 |

^{‡} Half points awarded as less than 75% of race distance was completed.

=== Complete Formula One results ===
(key)

| Year | Entrant | Chassis | Engine | 1 | 2 | 3 | 4 | 5 | 6 | 7 | 8 | 9 | 10 | 11 | 12 | 13 | 14 | 15 | 16 | 17 | 18 | WDC | Points |
|---|---|---|---|---|---|---|---|---|---|---|---|---|---|---|---|---|---|---|---|---|---|---|---|
| 2006 | Super Aguri F1 Team | Super Aguri SA05 | Honda RA806E 2.4 V8 | BHR; Ret | MAL; Ret | AUS; 13 | SMR; Ret | EUR | ESP | MON | GBR | CAN | USA | FRA | GER | HUN | TUR | ITA | CHN | JPN | BRA | 25th | 0 |

* Ide was entered as third driver but did not take part in the race weekend.
