= Osamu =

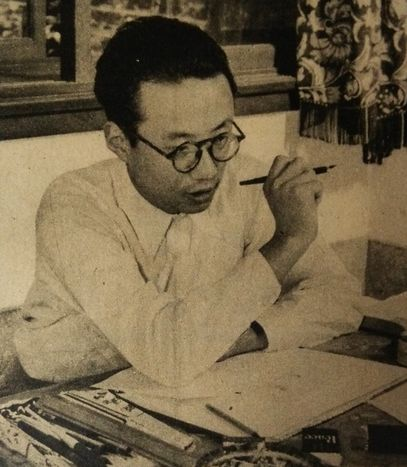
- Osamu Tezuka, a Japanese cartoonist, manga artist and animator
- Gender: Male

Origin
- Origin: Japanese
- Meaning: It can have many different meanings depending on the kanji used.

Osamu (おさむ, オサム) is a masculine Japanese given name.

== Written forms ==
Osamu can be written using different kanji characters and can mean:

- 治 "reign"
- 修 "discipline"
- 理 "logic"
- 収 "obtain"
- 紀 "chronicle"
- 統 "rule"

The name can also be written in hiragana or katakana.

== People with the name ==
- Osamu Abe (baseball) (安部 理; born 1962), Japanese baseball player and coach
- Osamu Abe (rower) (安部 収; born 1913), Japanese rower
- Osamu Adachi (足立 理; born 1987), Japanese actor
- Osamu Akimoto (秋本 治; born 1952), Japanese manga artist
- Osamu Annen (安念 治; 1934–2021), Japanese sumo wrestler
- Osamu Ashitomi (安次富 修; born 1956), Japanese politician
- Osamu Dazai (太宰 治; 1909–1948), Japanese author
- Osamu Dezaki (出﨑 統; 1943–2011), Japanese anime director
- Osamu Fujimura (藤村 修; born 1949), Japanese politician
- Osamu Fujimura (scientist) (藤村靖; 1927–2017), Japanese physicist, phonetician and linguist
- Osamu Fukutani (福谷 修; born 1967), Japanese film director
- Osamu Furuya (古谷 伸; 1920–2000), Japanese cinematographer
- Osamu Hagiwara (萩原修; born 1960), Japanese racing driver
- Osamu Hamanaka (濱中 治; born 1978), Japanese former professional baseball player
- Osamu Hayaishi (早石 修; 1920–2015), Japanese biochemist, physiologist and military physician
- Osamu Hayasaki (早崎 治; 1933–1993), Japanese photographer
- Osamu Hayashi (林 修; born 1965), Japanese television personality
- Osamu Higashio (東尾 修; born 1950), Japanese former baseball player
- Osamu Hirose (広瀬 治; born 1965), Japanese former footballer
- Osamu Hokuseihō (北青鵬 治; born 2001), Mongolian-born Japanese sumo wrestler
- Osamu Hosoi (細井 治; born 1964), Japanese voice actor
- Osamu Inoue (井上 治; born 1932), Japanese long-distance runner
- Osamu Ishiguro (石黒 修; 1936–2016), Japanese tennis player
- Osamu Ishiwata (石渡 治; born 1959), Japanese manga artist
- Osamu Henry Iyoha (イヨハ 理 ヘンリー; born 1998), Japanese footballer
- Osamu Kaneda (金田 治; born 1949), Japanese director and stuntman
- Osamu Kanemura (金村 修; born 1964), Japanese photographer
- Osamu Kido (木戸 修; born 1950), Japanese professional wrestler
- Osamu Kitajima (喜多嶋 修; born 1949), Japanese musician, producer and composer
- Osamu Kobayashi (animation director) (小林 治; born 1945), Japanese animator and animation director
- Osamu Kobayashi (illustrator) (小林 治; 1964–2021), Japanese animator, illustrator, mechanical designer and animation director
- Osamu Kobayashi (voice actor) (小林 治; 1934–2011), Japanese voice actor
- Osamu Kodama (児玉 修; born 1956), Japanese former alpine skier
- Osamu Kudō (工藤 修; 1915–1942), Japanese officer and ace fighter pilot
- Osamu Kuraishi (倉石 平; born 1956), Japanese basketball coach
- Osamu Maeda (前田 治; born 1965), Japanese former football player
- Osamu Mandai (万代 治; born 1942), Japanese rower
- Osamu Masuko (益子 修; 1949–2020), Japanese business executive
- Osamu Matsubara (松原 治; 1917–2012), Japanese businessman
- Osamu Matsuda (松田 納; born 1966), Japanese professional wrestler better known as El Samurai
- Osamu Mihara (三原 脩; 1911–1984), Japanese professional baseball player and manager
- Osamu Miyazaki (宮崎 敦; born 1966), Japanese former professional Grand Prix motorcycle road racer
- Osamu Mukai (向井 理; born 1982), Japanese actor
- Osamu Muramatsu (村松 修; born 1949), Japanese astronomer and discoverer of asteroids and comets
- Osamu Nagayama (永山 治; born 1947), Japanese businessman
- Osamu Naito (内藤 修; born 1949), Japanese speed skater
- Osamu Nakako (中子修; born 1954), Japanese former professional racing driver
- Osamu James Nakagawa (オサム ジェームス 中川; born 1962), Japanese-American photographer
- Osamu Nakajima (中嶋 修; 1958–2012), Japanese racing driver
- Osamu Nakamura (中村 修; born 1962), Japanese shogi player
- Osamu Nishimura (西村 修; 1971–2025), Japanese professional wrestler
- Osamu Noguchi (野口 修; 1934–2016), Japanese kickboxing promoter
- Osamu Ochiai (落合 治; born 1931), Japanese sport shooter
- Osamu Ota (太田 治; born 1965), Japanese former rugby union player and coach
- Osamu Saito (斎藤 修; born 1938), Japanese rower
- Osamu Saka (阪 脩), Japanese actor and voice actor
- Osamu Sakata (坂田 おさむ), Japanese actor
- Osamu Sato (佐藤 理; born 1960), Japanese artist, photographer and composer
- Osamu Sato (boxer) (佐藤 修; born 1976), Japanese boxer
- Osamu Shiihara (椎原 治; 1905–1974), Japanese photographer
- Osamu Shimomura (下村 脩; 1928–2018), Japanese organic chemist and marine biologist
- Osamu Shimomura (economist) (下村 治; 1910–1989), Japanese economist
- Osamu Shitara (設楽 統; born 1973), Japanese comedian and television presenter
- Osamu Sumida (住田 修; born 1969), Japanese cyclist
- Osamu Suzuki (businessman) (鈴木 修; 1930–2024), Japanese businessman
- Osamu Suzuki (ceramist) (鈴木 治; 1926–2001), Japanese ceramist
- Osamu Suzuki (screenwriter) (鈴木 収; born 1972), Japanese television writer, screenwriter, lyricist and tarento
- Osamu Tada (多田 修; born 1935), Japanese alpine skier
- Osamu Takechi (武知 治; 1914–unknown), Japanese field hockey player
- Osamu Takizawa (滝沢 修; 1906–2000), Japanese actor
- Osamu Taninaka (谷中 治; born 1964), Japanese former football player
- Osamu Tezuka (手塚 治; 1928–1989), Japanese manga artist, cartoonist and animator
- Osamu Tsuno (津野 修; born 1938), Japanese lawyer
- Osamu Tsurumine (鶴峯 治; 1941–2015), Japanese swimmer
- Osamu Umeyama (梅山 修; born 1973), Japanese former football player
- Osamu Ueno (上野 修; born 1983), Japanese freestyle skier
- Osamu Uno (宇野 治; born 1947), Japanese politician
- Osamu Wakabayashi (若林 修; 1944–2015), Canadian-Japanese professional ice hockey player
- Osamu Watanabe (渡辺 長武; born 1940), Japanese retired freestyle wrestler
- Osamu Yamazaki (山崎 修; born 1964), Japanese freestyle skier
- Osamu Yatabe (矢田部 理; 1932–2021), Japanese lawyer and politician
- Osamu Yoshioka (吉岡 治; 1934–2010), Japanese lyricist

== Fictional characters ==
- Osamu Dazai (太宰 治), a character in the anime and manga Bungo Stray Dogs
- Osamu Kamiyama (神山 治), a character in the anime series Kamisama Kazoku
- Osamu Kashiwagi (柏木 修), a character in the video game series Yakuza
- Osamu Kimizuka, a character in the shōnen-ai manga Loveless
- Osamu Kurihara (栗原 オサム), a character in the tokusatsu series Moero!! Robocon
- Osamu Mikumo (三雲 修), a character in the anime and manga World Trigger
- Osamu Miya (宮 治), a character in the anime and manga Haikyu!!
- Osamu Shibata (柴田 修), a character in the anime and manga series Ao no Orchestra

== See also ==
- 11930 Osamu, a main-belt asteroid
- "Osamu's Birthday", a 1967 song released as a B-side on a 2004 single from the United States of America
