= Osamu Nakajima =

Japanese racing driver (1958–2012)

Osamu Nakajima 中嶋 修
- Nationality: (Japan) Japanese
- Born: June 16, 1958 Kyoto, Japan
- Died: October 21, 2012 (aged 54) Suzuka Circuit, Japan

Super GT Series
- Years active: 2006-2007
- Teams: A&S Racing
- Starts: 13
- Wins: 0
- Poles: 0
- Best finish: 34th in 2006

Previous series
- 1996-2004: All Japan Grand Touring Car Championship

Osamu Nakajima (Shinjitai: 中嶋 修, born 16 June 1958 – 21 October 2012) was a Japanese racing driver.

Nakajima died in 2012 during a race at the Suzuka International Racing Course during the 2012 FIA WTCC Race of Japan when, at the Super Taikyu support race, his Nissan Fairlady Z (Z33) slipped in oil and crashed into the Turn 1 barrier. During the investigation, it was discovered Nakajima was in violation of international circuit regulations by failing to wear an approved head and neck restraint.

== Complete JGTC/Super GT Results ==
Year	Team	Car	Class	1	2	3	4	5	6	7	8	9	DC	Pts
1996	Prova Motorsport	Porsche 911 GT2	GT500	SUZ	FSW	SEN	FSW	SUG	MIN; Ret				NC	0
1998	Cobra Racing Team	Porsche 911	GT300	SUZ	FSW	SEN	FSW	TRM	MIN; 10	SUG			33rd	1
2001	R&D Sport	Porsche 911 GT3R	GT300	TAI; 9	FSW; 8	SUG; 6	FSW; 17	TRM; 17	SUZ; 5	MIN; 7			12th	23
2002	R&D Sport	Porsche 911 GT3R	GT300	TAI; 17	FSW; Ret	SUG; 3	SEP; 15	FSW; 17	TRM; 13	MIN; 10	SUZ; Ret		18th	13
2003	Team Leyjun	RGS Mirage GT-1	GT300	TAI; Ret	FSW; Ret	SUG; DNQ	FSW; 25		TRM; DNR	AUT			NC	0
2003	Team Leyjun	Porsche 996 GT3 R	GT300					FSW; 14					NC	0
2003	Team Leyjun	Vemac RD320R	GT300								SUZ; Ret		NC	0
2004	Team Leyjun	Vemac RD320R	GT300	TAI; 6	SUG; 6	SEP; 14	TOK; 22	TRM; 19	AUT; 17	SUZ; 16			12th	16
2006	A&S Racing	Mosler MT900R	GT300	SUZ; 13	OKA; 20	FSW; Ret	SEP	SUG; 13	SUZ; 13	TRM; 22	AUT; 17	FSW; Ret	34th	3
2007	A&S Racing	Mosler MT900R	GT300	SUZ; Ret	OKA; 23	FSW; Ret	SEP	SUG	SUZ; 18	TRM	AUT	FSW; 23	NC	0
