= Vemac RD350R =

Japanese grand touring race car

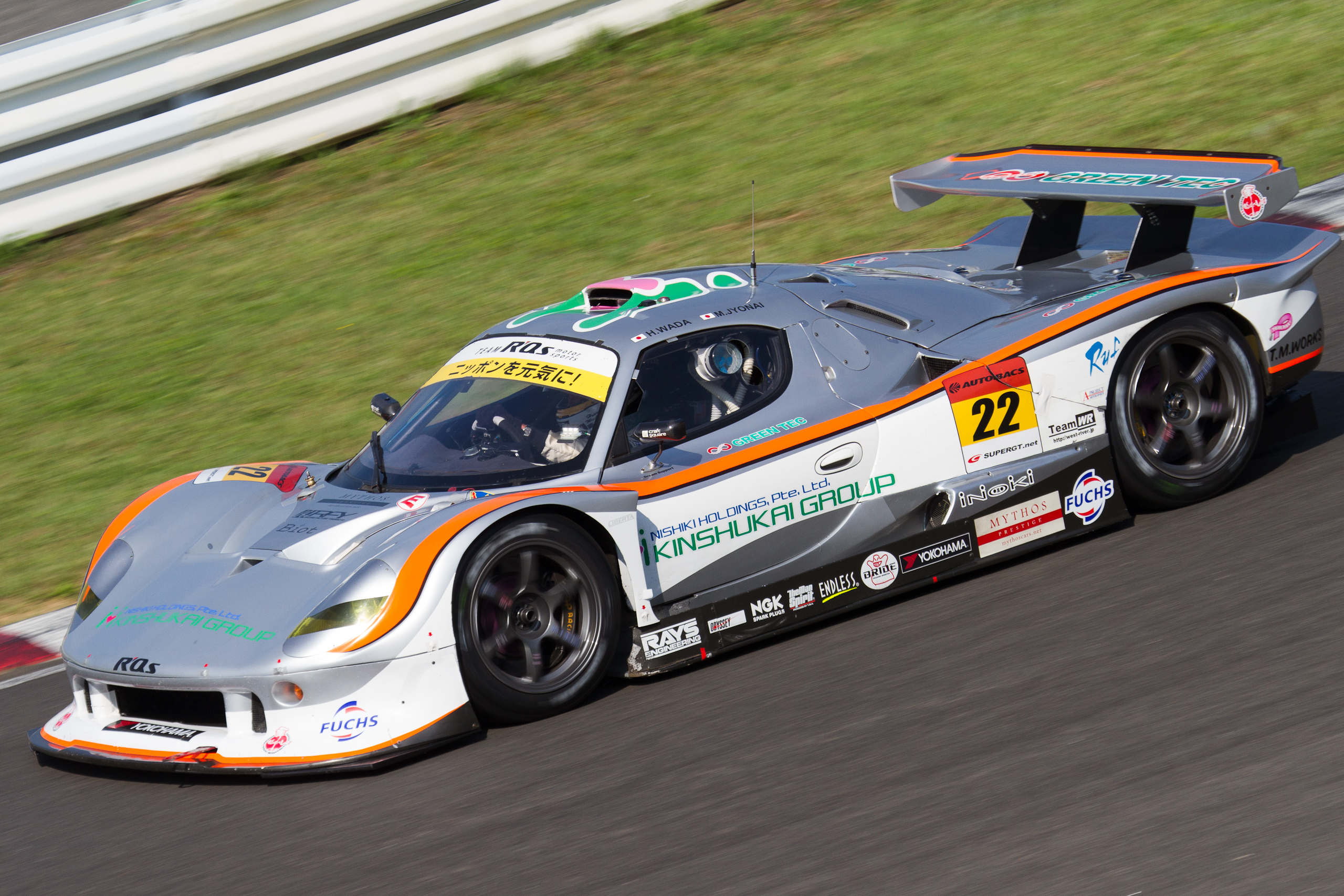
- Category: Super GT GT500 (2003); Super GT GT300 (2005–2012)
- Constructor: Vemac (Tokyo R&D)
- Designer: Masao Ono

Technical specifications
- Chassis: Hybrid steel aluminum
- Suspension (front): Double wishbone
- Suspension (rear): Double wishbone
- Length: 4,610 mm (181.5 in)
- Width: 1,995 mm (78.5 in)
- Height: 1,160 mm (45.7 in)
- Engine: Zytek ZV348 3,396 cc–3,995 cc V8 Naturally aspirated Mid-engined, longitudinally mounted
- Transmission: Hewland 6-speed sequential manual
- Power: 380 ps @ 5800 rpm
- Weight: 1,150 kg (2,535 lb)
- Tyres: Advan, Dunlop Tyres 300-640x18/355-710x18 (275-620x17/330-700x17)

Competition history
- Notable entrants: R&D Sport; Team Nova; R'Qs Motor Sports
- Notable drivers: (Japan) Shinsuke Shibahara; (Japan) Tetsuya Tanaka; (Japan) Hisashi Wada; (Japan) Masaki Jyonai
- Debut: 2003 Fuji 500km
- Last season: 2012
Races	Wins	Poles	F/Laps
55	0	0	0
- Constructors' Championships: 0
- Drivers' Championships: 0

The Vemac RD350R (Japanese: ヴィーマック・RD350R, Hepburn: Vuīmakku RD350R) is a race car produced by the Vemac Car Company that raced in the Japanese Super GT GT300 and GT500 classes. It competed between 2003 and 2012.

== Specifications ==
The RD350R is essentially a version of the RD320R introduced the previous year, but fitted with a Zytek Engineering (now Gibson Technology) ZV348 3.4 L V8. It was tuned by Sierra Sports and was bored and stroked to 4.0 L as of the final season in 2012. Although the RD350R features a similar appearance to the RD320R, it was changed significantly, mainly in terms of aerodynamics. The Zytek engine was selected to increase the car's power.

At least one road car, the RD350, was built. It was given the registration plate of EU03 CWP.

== Racing record ==
The car was introduced with R&D Sport for their foray into the GT500 class in 2003; the team performed poorly, finishing 20th in the standings with no points. Vemac would never compete for a full GT500 season again.

Other teams such as R'Qs Motor Sports and Team Nova also used the RD350R in competition. In later seasons, the RD350R ran with reduced power in the GT300 class through the use of air intake restrictors because the engine was too powerful. After the Super GT rule changes in 2012 that prohibited low-volume production cars from entering races, the RD350R (and likewise all other Vemacs) was no longer able to race in the series. The last team to use the RD350R, R'Qs Motor Sports, replaced their RD350R with a Mercedes-Benz SLS AMG GT3 for the 2013 season. The RD350R is the only one of the Vemacs that has not won a race in Super GT.
