= Yasutaka Hinoi =

Japanese racing driver

Yasutaka Hinoi (桧井保孝, Yasutaka Hinoi; born May 11, 1969 in Hiroshima) is a Japanese racing driver.

== Racing record ==
=== Japanese Top Formula Championship results ===
Year	Team	1	2	3	4	5	6	7	8	9	10	11	DC	Pts
1993	Nakajima Planning	SUZ; Ret	FUJ; 14	MIN; 10	SUZ; Ret	AUT; C	SUG; Ret	FUJ; C	FUJ; 14	SUZ; 13	FUJ; 15	SUZ; Ret	NC	0
1994	Nakajima Planning	SUZ; 9	FUJ; Ret	MIN; 8	SUZ; Ret	SUG; Ret	FUJ; 11	SUZ; Ret	FUJ; 9	FUJ; 13	SUZ; Ret		NC	0

=== Complete JGTC/Super GT Results ===
(key) (Races in bold indicate pole position) (Races in italics indicate fastest lap)

Year	Team	Car	Class	1	2	3	4	5	6	7	8	9	DC	Pts
1996	TEAM BMB MINIJUKE	Porsche 911	GT500	SUZ; Ret	FUJ; 12	SEN; 13	MIN; 8	SUG; 13	MIN; Ret				23rd	3
1998	Team 5Zigen	Toyota Supra	GT500	SUZ; 4	FUJ; C	SEN; 7	FUJ	MOT	MIN	SUG			13th	14
1999	Ability Motorsport	Porsche 911	GT300	SUZ; DNS	FUJ; 10	SUG; 9	MIN; Ret	FUJ; 15	TAI; 12	MOT; 10			28th	4
2000	Ability Motorsport	Porsche 911	GT300	MOT; 7	FUJ; 7	SUG; 2	FUJ; Ret	TAI; 5	MIN; Ret	SUZ; 8			10th	34
2001	Team Sri Lanka	Mosler MT900R	GT300	TAI	FUJ	SUG	FUJ	MOT; Ret	SUZ; Ret	MIN			NC	0
2002	Team Sri Lanka	Mosler MT900R	GT300	TAI; Ret	FUJ; 9	SUG; 18	SEP; 18	FUJ; 24	MOT; 16	MIN; Ret	SUZ; 13		22nd	6
2003	TEAM B1	Vemac RD320R	GT300	TAI; 9	FUJ; 9	SUG; 2	FUJ; 19	FUJ; 7	MOT; Ret	AUT; 6	SUZ; 7		12th	34
2004	TEAM MACH	Vemac RD320R	GT300	TAI; 5	SUG; 16	SEP; 3	TOK; 18	MOT; 5	AUT; 12	SUZ; 12			10th	24
2005	JIM GAINER	Ferrari 360 Modena	GT300	OKA; 13	FUJ; 17	SEP; Ret	SUG; 10	MOT; 5	FUJ; Ret	AUT; 19	SUZ; 5		10th	14
2006	JLOC	Lamborghini Murcielago R-GT	GT300	SUZ; 1	OKA; 6	FUJ; Ret	SEP	**SUG**; 15	SUZ; Ret	MOT; Ret	AUT; 8	FUJ; 5	11th	40
2007	JLOC	Lamborghini Murcielago R-GT	GT300	SUZ; 12	OKA; 4	FUJ; 9	SEP; 7	SUG; DNS	SUZ	MOT	AUT	FUJ; 15	19th	14

=== 24 Hours of Le Mans results ===
Year	Team	Co-Drivers	Car	Class	Laps	Pos.	Class Pos.
2006	(Japan) JLOC Isao Noritake	(Italy) Marco Apicella (Japan) Koji Yamanishi	Lamborghini Murciélago RG-1LM	GT1	283	DNF	DNF
