= Takashi Inoue =

Japanese actor (1960–2017)

- 井之上 隆志
- Born: 27 December 1960; Miyazaki Prefecture, Japan
- Died: 4 March 2017 (aged 56); Tokyo, Japan
- Occupation: Actor
- Agent: K Factory
- Height: 178 cm (5 ft 10 in)
- Website: Official profile

Takashi Inoue (井之上 隆志, Inoue Takashi; 27 December 1960 – 4 March 2017) was a Japanese actor.

Inoue was born from Miyazaki Prefecture. He was represented with K Factory.

== Biography ==
Inoue participated as a founding member of Gekidan Kakusoko presided over by Ikuji Nakamura from 1987, in which he was active mainly on stage. After the dissolution of the theatre unit in 2002 he was active in television dramas and theatre, in which he appeared in popular series such as Wataru Seken wa Oni Bakari (Tokyo Broadcasting System), Doctor-X: Surgeon Michiko Daimon and Aibō (both TV Asahi), and played an active role as a name apprentice who skillfully plays diverse characters ranging from hot middle-aged men to cold villains.

Inoue's special skill was on the drum kit, in the Wataoni Oyaji Band in the form of Takuzo Kadono in Wataru Seken wa Oni Bakari, he was in charge of percussion and also performed his CD debut.

He found out he had cancer in December 2015, and he continued his work while repeating hospital admissions, and later became hospitalized after losing his physical condition in late February 2017. Inoue died of lower laryngeal cancer at a hospital in Tokyo at 18:30 on 4 March of the same year. The stage play Yukimaroge in 2016 became his final appearance.

== Filmography ==
=== Stage ===
Title
Nenchūmukyū
Ika Hotel
Fujimichō Apartment-Umi e
Sakura Giminden
Sonotettō ni Otokotachihairutoiu
Rokugatsudō no Sanshimai
Ōki-Gendai-ban
Akasaka Ōkabuki
Zabuzabu Hatoba

=== TV dramas ===
NHK

Title
GeGeGe no Nyōbō
Ai to Yūjō no Bugiugi
Challenged: Sotsugyō

Nippon TV

Title
Seigi no Mikata
Yottsu Ha Jinja Ura Kagyō Shitsurenhoken: Tsuge-ra Se-ya
Woman

Tokyo Broadcasting System

Title
Wataru Seken wa Oni Bakari
Sandaime no Yome!
Tax Inspector Madogiwa Taro
Leaders

Fuji Television

Title
Love Generation
Nisen Nen no Koi
Brothers
The Hit Parade: Geinō-kai o Kaeta Otoko-Shin Watanabe Monogatari
Himitsuna Okusan
Boku to Star no 99 Nichi
Dolce
Seicho Matsumoto Botsugo 20-nen Tokubetsu Kikaku-Giwaku
Seicho Matsumoto Drama Special-Shi no Hassō

TV Asahi

Title	Role
Tensai Keiji-Bonroku Noro	
Abunai Hōkago	
Doctor-X: Surgeon Michiko Daimon	
Aibō season 14	Gunpei Umezu

TV Tokyo

Title
Tenohirano Yami
Fuben na Benri-ya

=== Anime television ===
Year	Title	Role	Network
2003	Texhnolyze	Kazuho Yoshii	Fuji TV

=== Films ===
Year	Title	Role
2015	Kakekomi	Bisanjin
2015	Japan's Longest Day	Army four-star rank Yoshijirō Umezu

=== Dubbing ===
Title	Role
Queen Kong	Police chief
