= Vemac RD408R =

Japanese grand touring race car

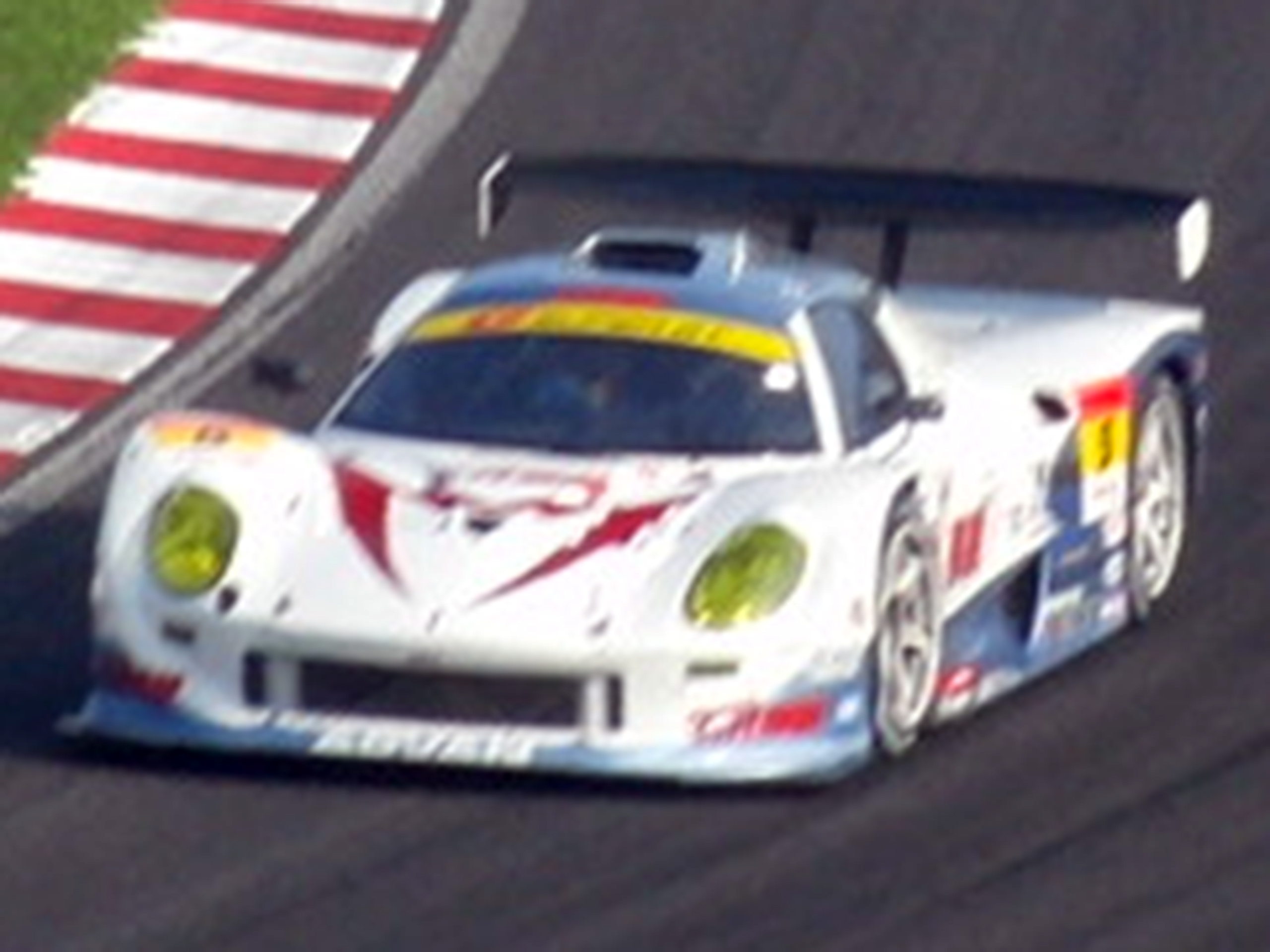
- Category: Super GT GT500 (2004); Super GT GT300 (2006–2010)
- Constructor: Vemac (Tokyo R&D)
- Designer: Masao Ono

Technical specifications
- Chassis: Hybrid steel aluminum
- Suspension: Double wishbone
- Length: 4,610 mm (181.5 in)
- Width: 1,990 mm (78.3 in)
- Height: 1,160 mm (45.7 in)
- Engine: Mugen MF408S 4,000 cc V8; Mugen MF458S 4,500 cc V8; Porsche M96/77 3,598 cc F6; Naturally aspirated Mid-engined, longitudinally mounted
- Transmission: Hewland 6-speed sequential manual
- Power: >460 PS (>340 kW) 8200 rpm
- Weight: 1,250 kg (2,756 lb)
- Tyres: Advan, Dunlop Tyres 280-710x18

Competition history
- Notable entrants: R&D Sport; Team Mach
- Notable drivers: (Japan) Shinsuke Shibahara; (Japan) Tetsuji Tamanaka
- Debut: 2004 Suzuka GT 300 km
- Last season: 2010
Races	Wins	Poles	F/Laps
37	2	0	0
- Constructors' Championships: 0
- Drivers' Championships: 0

The Vemac RD408R (Japanese: ヴィーマック・RD408R, Hepburn: Vuīmakku RD408R) is a race car produced by the Vemac Car Company that raced in the Japanese Super GT GT300 and GT500 classes. It raced between 2004 and 2010.

== Specifications ==
The RD408R is essentially a version of the RD320R introduced in 2002, but fitted with a Mugen Motorsports MF408S 4.0 L V8. The RD408R was developed specifically to compete in the GT500 class as a successor to the RD350R. In later years the RD408R's engine was replaced with a Mugen MF458S V8.

At least one road car, known as the RD408, was built. It was given the registration plate of EU54 BXA. A related car, the RD408H, was also developed; this was essentially the RD408 road car with a hybrid system developed by PUES Corporation, one of Tokyo R&D's subsidiaries. The RD408H was intended to be produced in small numbers and compete in races but ultimately found no buyers.

== Racing record ==
The car was first introduced with R&D Sport in 2004 at the final round of the championship in Suzuka; the team performed poorly, finishing 13th in the race with no points and never competed in the GT500 class again. No RD408Rs competed in 2005; the year after, R&D Sport campaigned an RD408R in 2006, winning the Fuji GT 500 km Race. The RD408R would win the 2007 Autopolis GT 300 km Race; this would be the last win for any Vemac in the series.

The last race for the RD408R was the Motegi GT 250 km in 2010, with a sole RD408R campaigned by Team Mach; it notably used a Mid West Racing-tuned Porsche 911 GT3 engine as opposed to the Mugen powerplant used in previous years. the team would replace their RD408R with an RD320R for 2011, the first time they had used the RD320R since 2009. This RD320R would also use an engine from the Porsche 911 GT3. After the Super GT rule changes in 2012 that prohibited low-volume production cars from entering races, the RD408R (and likewise all other Vemacs) is no longer able to race in the series. Despite the RD408R being the latest and fastest of all the Vemacs, it never really reached the competitiveness of the RD320R.
