= Vemac RD320R =

Japanese grand touring race car

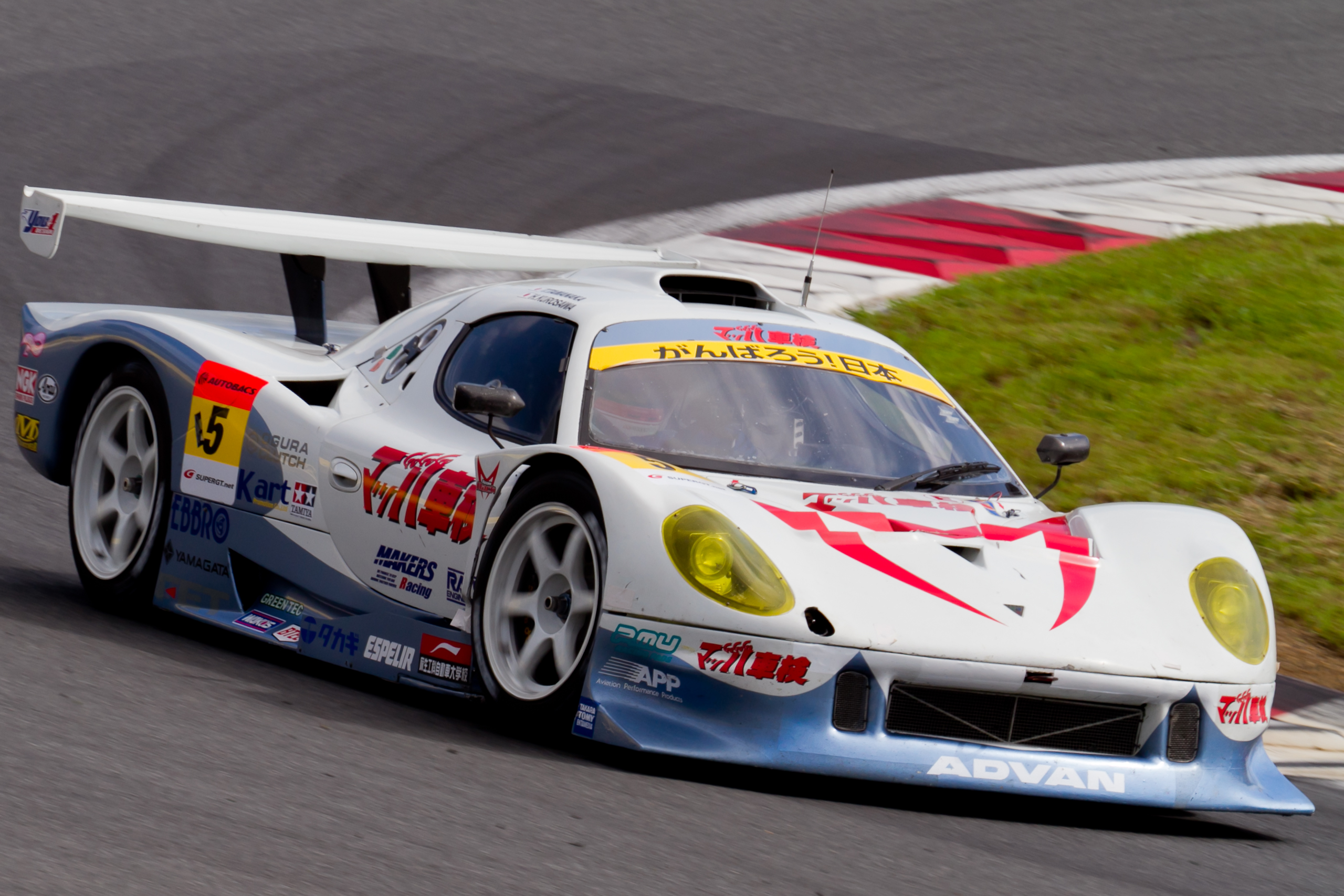
- Category: Super GT GT300
- Constructor: Vemac (Tokyo R&D)
- Designer: Masao Ono

Technical specifications
- Chassis: Hybrid steel aluminum
- Suspension (front): Double wishbone
- Suspension (rear): Double wishbone
- Length: 4,467 mm (175.9 in)
- Width: 1,825 mm (71.9 in)
- Height: 1,120 mm (44.1 in)
- Engine: Honda C32B 3,424 cc V6; Porsche M96/77 3,598 cc F6 Naturally aspirated Mid-engined, longitudinally mounted
- Transmission: Hewland 6-speed sequential manual
- Power: 380 hp @ 7500 rpm 297 lb-ft (402 N.m.) @ 6500 rpm
- Weight: 880–1,150 kg (1,940–2,535 lb)
- Tyres: Advan, Kumho, Dunlop Tyres 300-640x18/355-710x18 (275-620x17/330-700x17)

Competition history
- Notable entrants: R&D Sport; Team B-1; Team LeyJun; Team Mach; Verno Tokai Dream28; Direxiv Motorsports; Yokoyama Racing; Avanzza Rosso
- Notable drivers: (Japan) Shinsuke Shibahara; (Japan) Tetsuji Tamanaka; (Japan) Yasutaka Hinoi; (Japan) Osamu Nakajima; (Japan) Hiroki Yoshimoto; (Japan) Nobuteru Taniguchi
- Debut: 2002 Fuji 500km
- Last season: 2011
Races	Wins	Poles	F/Laps
80	3	1	1
- Constructors' Championships: 0
- Drivers' Championships: 0

The Vemac RD320R (Japanese: ヴィーマック・RD320R, Hepburn: Vuīmakku RD320R) is a race car produced by the Vemac Car Company that raced in the Japanese Super GT GT300 class. It raced between 2002 and 2011 and completed over 150 races in Japan alone.

== Specifications ==
When it was introduced in 2002, it used a C32B V6 sourced from a Honda NSX tuned by Toda Racing; this engine would be bored and stroked to 3.4 L similar to the NSXs running in GT500 at the time. The RD320R uses a Hewland 6-speed manual transmission actuated through a shift lever.

More powerful versions intended for GT500 competition, the RD350R and RD408R, were developed in 2003 and 2004 respectively; these featured larger V8 engines for increased power. These cars competed without success in GT500 but were somewhat competitive in the GT300 fields they were ultimately relegated to.

At least one road car, known as the RD320, was built. It was given the registration plate of EX02 OME.

== Racing record ==
The RD320R was first introduced by R&D Sport in 2002 at the Fuji 500 km, the second round of the season, replacing one of their Porsche 911 GT3s. The RD320R dominated the season, achieving a pole position and winning its debut race and scoring three wins in total, although it lost the championship to the Toyota MR-S of Autobacs Racing Team Aguri due to various balance of performance adjustments. Other teams, notably Team Mach, Team LeyJun and Direxiv Motorsports, a small team with Formula One aspirations, would also compete with the RD320R. Team Mach's RD320R was notable in that it used an engine sourced from a Porsche 911 GT3 starting in 2009.

The last race for the RD320R was the Motegi GT race in 2011, with a sole RD320R driven by Team Mach; the team would replace their RD320R with a Ferrari 458 Italia GT3. After the Super GT rule changes in 2012 that prohibited low-volume production cars from entering races, the RD320R (and likewise all other Vemacs) is no longer able to race in the series. An ex-Avanzza Rosso car, chassis number SVCRD320R03H0005, was imported into the United States in 2018 and is currently being restored by a private collector.
