= Shinsuke Shibahara =

Japanese racing driver

Shinsuke Shibahara (柴原眞介, Shibahara Shinsuke; born February 13, 1967) is a professional race car driver.

== Complete Formula Nippon results ==
(key) (Races in bold indicate pole position) (Races in italics indicate fastest lap)

Year	Team	1	2	3	4	5	6	7	8	9	10	DC	Pts
1997	Team Cerumo	SUZ	MIN	FSW	SUZ	SUG	FSW	MIN	TRM; 12	FSW; 10	SUZ; Ret	NC	0
1998	Team Leyjun	SUZ; 11	MIN; Ret	FSW; 12	TRM; 12	SUZ; Ret	SUG; Ret	FSW; C	MIN; 10	FSW; Ret	SUZ; Ret	NC	0
1999	Team Leyjun	SUZ	TRM	MIN	FSW	SUZ	SUG; Ret	FSW; Ret	MIN; 8	TRM; 15	SUZ; 14	NC	0
2000	Team Leyjun	SUZ; 9	TRM; 12	MIN; 9	FSW; 7	SUZ; 9	SUG; 6	TRM; Ret	FSW; 3	MIN; 13	SUZ; 14	11th	5
