= 2008 Super GT Series =

Car racing tournament season

The 2008 Autobacs Super GT Series was the sixteenth season of the Japan Automobile Federation Super GT Championship including the All Japan Grand Touring Car Championship (JGTC) era and the fourth season as the Super GT series. It marked as well as the twenty-sixth season of a JAF-sanctioned sports car racing championship dating back to the All Japan Sports Prototype Championship. It is a series for Grand Touring race cars divided into two categories: GT500 and GT300. This was the first season for the new R35 GT-R, replacing the Z which had been used for all GT500 Nissan teams from 2004-2007. The season began on March 15 and ended on November 9, 2008 after 9 races.

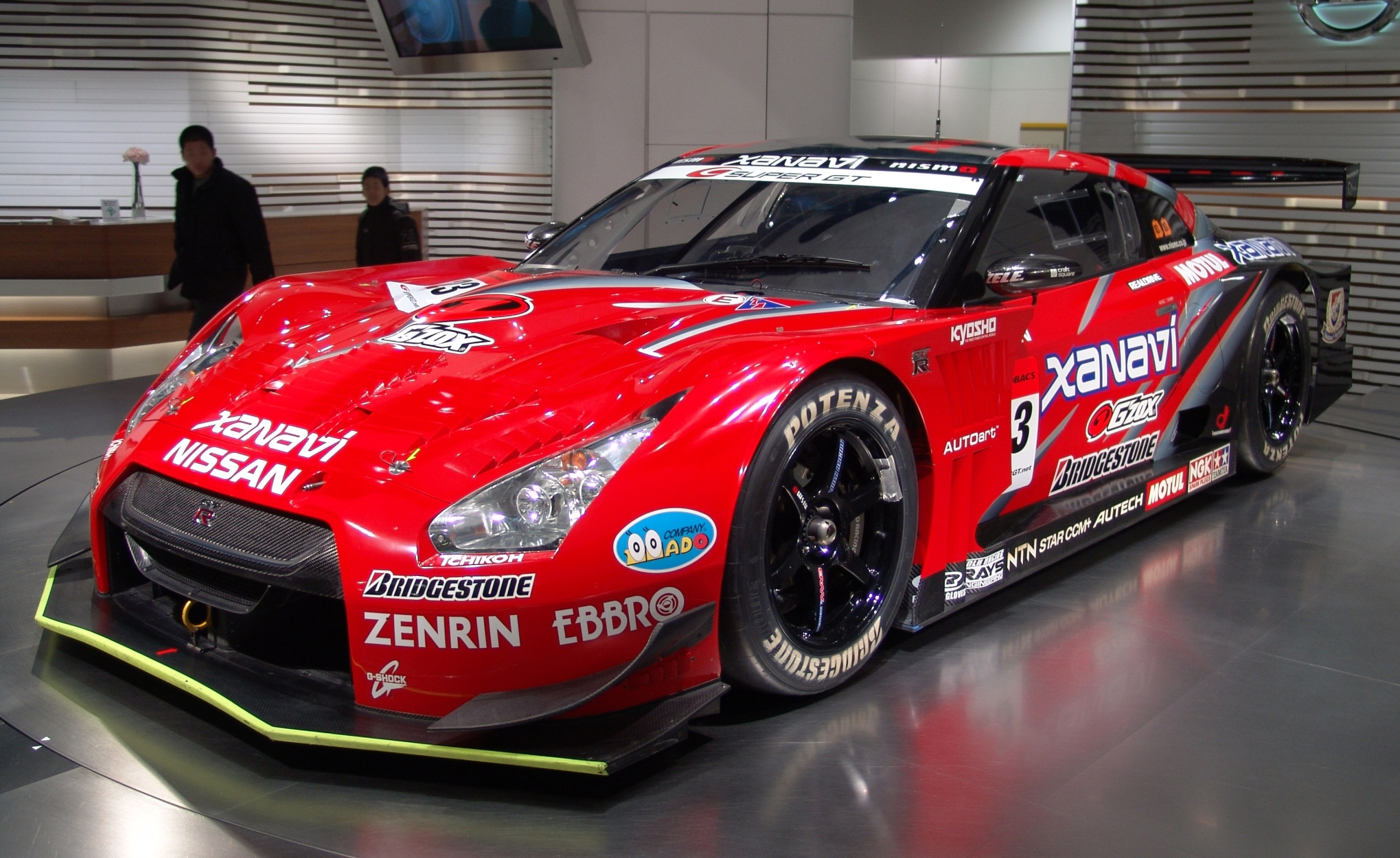
2008 Xanavi Nismo GT-R (R35).

== Drivers and teams ==
=== GT500 ===
Team	Make	Car	Engine	No.	Drivers	Tyre	Rounds
Autobacs Racing Team Aguri	Honda	Honda NSX GT500	Honda C32B 3.5 L V6	1	(Republic of Ireland) Ralph Firman	B	All
Autobacs Racing Team Aguri	Honda	Honda NSX GT500	Honda C32B 3.5 L V6	1	(Japan) Takuya Izawa	B	All
Hasemi Motorsport	Nissan	Nissan GT-R GT500	Nissan VK45DE 4.5 L V8	3	(Italy) Ronnie Quintarelli	B	All
Hasemi Motorsport	Nissan	Nissan GT-R GT500	Nissan VK45DE 4.5 L V8	3	(Japan) Naoki Yokomizo	B	All
ENEOS Toyota Team LeMans	Lexus	Lexus SC430 GT500	Lexus 3UZ-FE 4.5 L V8	6	(Japan) Daisuke Ito	B	1–4, 9
ENEOS Toyota Team LeMans	Lexus	Lexus SC430 GT500	Lexus 3UZ-FE 4.5 L V8	6	(Sweden) Björn Wirdheim	B	All
ENEOS Toyota Team LeMans	Lexus	Lexus SC430 GT500	Lexus 3UZ-FE 4.5 L V8	6	(Japan) Akira Iida	B	5–8
ENEOS Toyota Team LeMans	Lexus	Lexus SC430 GT500	Lexus 3UZ-FE 4.5 L V8	6	(Brazil) Roberto Streit	B	6
Team Impul	Nissan	Nissan GT-R GT500	Nissan VK45DE 4.5 L V8	12	(Japan) Tsugio Matsuda	B	1–4, 6–9
Team Impul	Nissan	Nissan GT-R GT500	Nissan VK45DE 4.5 L V8	12	(France) Sébastien Philippe	B	All
Team Impul	Nissan	Nissan GT-R GT500	Nissan VK45DE 4.5 L V8	12	(Germany) Dominik Schwager	B	5
Real Racing with Leon	Honda	Honda NSX GT500	Honda C32B 3.5 L V6	17	(Japan) Katsutomo Kaneishi	B	All
Real Racing with Leon	Honda	Honda NSX GT500	Honda C32B 3.5 L V6	17	(Japan) Toshihiro Kaneishi	B	All
Real Racing with Leon	Honda	Honda NSX GT500	Honda C32B 3.5 L V6	17	(Japan) Koudai Tsukakoshi	B	6
Dome Racing Team	Honda	Honda NSX GT500	Honda C32B 3.5 L V6	18	(Japan) Ryō Michigami	B	All
Dome Racing Team	Honda	Honda NSX GT500	Honda C32B 3.5 L V6	18	(Japan) Takashi Kogure	B	All
Nismo	Nissan	Nissan GT-R GT500	Nissan VK45DE 4.5 L V8	22	(Germany) Michael Krumm	B	All
Nismo	Nissan	Nissan GT-R GT500	Nissan VK45DE 4.5 L V8	22	(Japan) Masataka Yanagida	B	All
Nismo	Nissan	Nissan GT-R GT500	Nissan VK45DE 4.5 L V8	22	(Germany) Dominik Schwager	B	6
Nismo	Nissan	Nissan GT-R GT500	Nissan VK45DE 4.5 L V8	23	(Japan) Satoshi Motoyama	B	All
Nismo	Nissan	Nissan GT-R GT500	Nissan VK45DE 4.5 L V8	23	(France) Benoît Tréluyer	B	All
Nismo	Nissan	Nissan GT-R GT500	Nissan VK45DE 4.5 L V8	23	(Brazil) Fabio Carbone	B	6
Kondo Racing	Nissan	Nissan GT-R GT500	Nissan VK45DE 4.5 L V8	24	(Brazil) João Paulo de Oliveira	Y	All
Kondo Racing	Nissan	Nissan GT-R GT500	Nissan VK45DE 4.5 L V8	24	(Japan) Seiji Ara	Y	All
Toyota Team Tsuchiya	Lexus	Lexus SC430 GT500	Lexus 3UZ-FE 4.5 L V8	25	(Japan) Takeshi Tsuchiya	Y	All
Toyota Team Tsuchiya	Lexus	Lexus SC430 GT500	Lexus 3UZ-FE 4.5 L V8	25	(Japan) Hiroaki Ishiura	Y	All
Nakajima Racing	Honda	Honda NSX GT500	Honda C32B 3.5 L V6	32	(France) Loïc Duval	D	All
Nakajima Racing	Honda	Honda NSX GT500	Honda C32B 3.5 L V6	32	(Japan) Katsuyuki Hiranaka	D	All
Houzan Toyota Team Kraft	Lexus	Lexus SC430 GT500	Lexus 3UZ-FE 4.5 L V8	35	(United Kingdom) Peter Dumbreck	B	All
Houzan Toyota Team Kraft	Lexus	Lexus SC430 GT500	Lexus 3UZ-FE 4.5 L V8	35	(Japan) Tatsuya Kataoka	B	All
Houzan Toyota Team Kraft	Lexus	Lexus SC430 GT500	Lexus 3UZ-FE 4.5 L V8	35	(Japan) Shigekazu Wakisaka	B	6
Petronas Toyota Team TOM'S	Lexus	Lexus SC430 GT500	Lexus 3UZ-FE 4.5 L V8	36	(Japan) Juichi Wakisaka	B	All
Petronas Toyota Team TOM'S	Lexus	Lexus SC430 GT500	Lexus 3UZ-FE 4.5 L V8	36	(Germany) André Lotterer	B	All
Petronas Toyota Team TOM'S	Lexus	Lexus SC430 GT500	Lexus 3UZ-FE 4.5 L V8	36	(Netherlands) Carlo van Dam	B	6
ZENT Toyota Team Cerumo	Lexus	Lexus SC430 GT500	Lexus 3UZ-FE 4.5 L V8	38	(Japan) Yuji Tachikawa	B	All
ZENT Toyota Team Cerumo	Lexus	Lexus SC430 GT500	Lexus 3UZ-FE 4.5 L V8	38	(United Kingdom) Richard Lyons	B	All
Toyota Team SARD	Lexus	Lexus SC430 GT500	Lexus 3UZ-FE 4.5 L V8	39	(Japan) Toranosuke Takagi	D	All
Toyota Team SARD	Lexus	Lexus SC430 GT500	Lexus 3UZ-FE 4.5 L V8	39	(Portugal) André Couto	D	All
Toyota Team SARD	Lexus	Lexus SC430 GT500	Lexus 3UZ-FE 4.5 L V8	39	(Japan) Koki Saga	D	6
Team Kunimitsu	Honda	Honda NSX GT500	Honda C32B 3.5 L V6	100	(Japan) Yuji Ide	B	All
Team Kunimitsu	Honda	Honda NSX GT500	Honda C32B 3.5 L V6	100	(Japan) Shinya Hosokawa	B	All
Team Kunimitsu	Honda	Honda NSX GT500	Honda C32B 3.5 L V6	100	(Japan) Kosuke Matsuura	B	6

=== GT300 ===
Team	Make	Car	Engine	No.	Drivers	Tyre	Rounds
Cars Tokai Dream28	Mooncraft	Mooncraft Shiden	Toyota 1UZ-FE 4.4 L V8	2	(Japan) Kazuho Takahashi	Y	All
Cars Tokai Dream28	Mooncraft	Mooncraft Shiden	Toyota 1UZ-FE 4.4 L V8	2	(Japan) Hiroki Katoh	Y	All
Cars Tokai Dream28	Mooncraft	Mooncraft Shiden	Toyota 1UZ-FE 4.4 L V8	2	(Japan) Hiroki Yoshimoto	Y	6
Team Uematsu Nova	Vemac	Vemac RD320R	Honda C32B 3.4 L V6	4	(Japan) Ryohei Sakaguchi	Y	All
Team Uematsu Nova	Vemac	Vemac RD320R	Honda C32B 3.4 L V6	4	(Japan) Masaki Matsushita	Y	All
Team Uematsu Nova	Vemac	Vemac RD320R	Honda C32B 3.4 L V6	4	(Japan) Tadao Uematsu	Y	6
Team Uematsu Nova	Vemac	Vemac RD350R	Zytek ZV348 3.9 L V8	16	(Japan) Tadao Uematsu	Y	1, 3, 9
Team Uematsu Nova	Vemac	Vemac RD350R	Zytek ZV348 3.9 L V8	16	(Japan) Katsuhiko Tsutsui	Y	1, 3, 9
Team Mach	Vemac	Vemac RD320R	Honda C32B 3.4 L V6	5	(Japan) Tetsuji Tamanaka	Y	All
Team Mach	Vemac	Vemac RD320R	Honda C32B 3.4 L V6	5	(Japan) Naoya Yamano	Y	1–7, 9
Team Mach	Vemac	Vemac RD320R	Honda C32B 3.4 L V6	5	(Japan) Katsuhiko Tsutsui	Y	6, 8
RE Amemiya Racing	Mazda	Mazda RX-7	Mazda RE20B 2.0 L 3-rotor	7	(Japan) Hiroyuki Iiri	Y	All
RE Amemiya Racing	Mazda	Mazda RX-7	Mazda RE20B 2.0 L 3-rotor	7	(Japan) Ryo Orime	Y	All
RE Amemiya Racing	Mazda	Mazda RX-7	Mazda RE20B 2.0 L 3-rotor	7	(Japan) Hiroyuki Matsumura	Y	6
A&S Racing	Chevrolet	Chevrolet Corvette	Chevrolet LS1 6.0 L V8	9	(Japan) Tatsuya Tanigawa	K	3, 6, 8
A&S Racing	Chevrolet	Chevrolet Corvette	Chevrolet LS1 6.0 L V8	9	(Japan) Hirofumi Takei	K	3, 6, 8
A&S Racing	Chevrolet	Chevrolet Corvette	Chevrolet LS1 6.0 L V8	9	(Japan) Takayuki Matsumoto	K	6
Jim Gainer Racing	Ferrari	Ferrari F430	Ferrari F136E 4.3 L V8	11	(Japan) Tetsuya Tanaka	Y	All
Jim Gainer Racing	Ferrari	Ferrari F430	Ferrari F136E 4.3 L V8	11	(Japan) Masayuki Ueda	Y	All
Racing Project Bandoh	Toyota	Toyota Celica	Toyota 3S-GTE 2.0 L Turbo I4	19	(Japan) Manabu Orido	Y	1–3
Racing Project Bandoh	Toyota	Toyota Celica	Toyota 3S-GTE 2.0 L Turbo I4	19	(Japan) Tsubasa Abe	Y	1–3
Racing Project Bandoh	Lexus	Lexus IS350	Lexus RV8J 3.4 L V8	19	(Japan) Manabu Orido	Y	4–9
Racing Project Bandoh	Lexus	Lexus IS350	Lexus RV8J 3.4 L V8	19	(Japan) Tsubasa Abe	Y	4–9
Racing Project Bandoh	Lexus	Lexus IS350	Lexus RV8J 3.4 L V8	19	(Japan) Yuhi Sekiguchi	Y	6
Team Taisan with Nishizawa	Porsche	Porsche 996 GT3-RS	Porsche M96/77 3.6 L F6	26	(Japan) Nobuteru Taniguchi	Y	All
Team Taisan with Nishizawa	Porsche	Porsche 996 GT3-RS	Porsche M96/77 3.6 L F6	26	(Japan) Shinichi Yamaji	Y	1–8
Team Taisan with Nishizawa	Porsche	Porsche 996 GT3-RS	Porsche M96/77 3.6 L F6	26	(Japan) Keita Sawa	Y	6
Team Taisan with Nishizawa	Porsche	Porsche 996 GT3-RS	Porsche M96/77 3.6 L F6	26	(Germany) Dominik Farnbacher	Y	9
Team Shadow	Porsche	Porsche 996 GT3-RSR	Porsche M96/73 3.6 L F6	27	(Japan) Takashi Inoue	H	1, 3, 6–7, 9
Team Shadow	Porsche	Porsche 996 GT3-RSR	Porsche M96/73 3.6 L F6	27	(South Korea) Hwang Jin Woo	H	1, 3, 6–7
Team Shadow	Porsche	Porsche 996 GT3-RSR	Porsche M96/73 3.6 L F6	27	(Japan) Yasuhiro Takasaki	H	6
Team Shadow	Porsche	Porsche 996 GT3-RSR	Porsche M96/73 3.6 L F6	27	(Japan) Koji Aoyama	H	9
apr	Toyota	Toyota MR-S	Toyota 2GR-FSE 3.5 L V6	31	(Japan) Kyosuke Mineo	M	1–5, 7–9
apr	Toyota	Toyota MR-S	Toyota 2GR-FSE 3.5 L V6	31	(Japan) Yuya Sakamoto	M	1–5, 7–9
apr	Toyota	Toyota MR-S	Toyota 2GR-FSE 3.5 L V6	95	(Japan) Kohei Hirate	M	1–5, 8–9
apr	Toyota	Toyota MR-S	Toyota 2GR-FSE 3.5 L V6	95	(Japan) Keisuke Kunimoto	M	All
apr	Toyota	Toyota MR-S	Toyota 2GR-FSE 3.5 L V6	95	(Japan) Yuya Sakamoto	M	6
apr	Toyota	Toyota MR-S	Toyota 2GR-FSE 3.5 L V6	95	(Japan) Kazuya Oshima	M	6
apr	Toyota	Toyota MR-S	Toyota 2GR-FSE 3.5 L V6	95	(Japan) Hideki Yamauchi	M	7
Hankook KTR	Porsche	Porsche 997 GT3-RSR	Porsche M97/80 3.8 L F6	33	(Japan) Mitsuhiro Kinoshita	H	All
Hankook KTR	Porsche	Porsche 997 GT3-RSR	Porsche M97/80 3.8 L F6	33	(Japan) Masami Kageyama	H	All
Autobacs Racing Team Aguri	ASL	ASL ARTA Garaiya	Nissan VQ35DE 3.5 L V6	43	(Japan) Morio Nitta	M	All
Autobacs Racing Team Aguri	ASL	ASL ARTA Garaiya	Nissan VQ35DE 3.5 L V6	43	(Japan) Shinichi Takagi	M	All
Autobacs Racing Team Aguri	ASL	ASL ARTA Garaiya	Nissan VQ35DE 3.5 L V6	43	(Japan) Kyosuke Mineo	M	6
MOLA	Nissan	Nissan Fairlady Z	Nissan VQ35DE 3.5 L V6	46	(Japan) Kazuki Hoshino	M	All
MOLA	Nissan	Nissan Fairlady Z	Nissan VQ35DE 3.5 L V6	46	(Japan) Hironobu Yasuda	M	All
Team Takeuchi with Shift	Lexus	Lexus IS350	Lexus RV8J 3.4 L V8	52	(Japan) Takuya Kurosawa	K	3–9
Team Takeuchi with Shift	Lexus	Lexus IS350	Lexus RV8J 3.4 L V8	52	(Japan) Takuto Iguchi	K	3–9
Team Takeuchi with Shift	Lexus	Lexus IS350	Lexus RV8J 3.4 L V8	52	(Japan) Hideki Yamauchi	K	6
Willcom R&D Sport	Vemac	Vemac RD408R	Mugen MF458S 4.5 L V8	62	(Japan) Shinsuke Shibahara	Y	1, 5–9
Willcom R&D Sport	Vemac	Vemac RD408R	Mugen MF458S 4.5 L V8	62	(Japan) Haruki Kurosawa	Y	All
Willcom R&D Sport	Vemac	Vemac RD408R	Mugen MF458S 4.5 L V8	62	(Japan) Shogo Mitsuyama	Y	2–4, 6
JLOC	Lamborghini	Lamborghini Murciélago RG-1	Lamborghini L535 6.0 L V12	66	(Japan) Koji Yamanishi	Y	All
JLOC	Lamborghini	Lamborghini Murciélago RG-1	Lamborghini L535 6.0 L V12	66	(Japan) Atsushi Yogo	Y	All
JLOC	Lamborghini	Lamborghini Gallardo RG-3	Lamborghini 07L1 5.0 L V10	87	(Japan) Hisashi Wada	Y	All
JLOC	Lamborghini	Lamborghini Gallardo RG-3	Lamborghini 07L1 5.0 L V10	87	(Japan) Muneyuki Kurihara	Y	All
JLOC	Lamborghini	Lamborghini Gallardo RG-3	Lamborghini 07L1 5.0 L V10	87	(Japan) Yoshihisa Namekata	Y	6
JLOC	Lamborghini	Lamborghini Gallardo RG-3	Lamborghini 07L1 5.0 L V10	88	(Japan) Hideshi Matsuda	Y	All
JLOC	Lamborghini	Lamborghini Gallardo RG-3	Lamborghini 07L1 5.0 L V10	88	(Japan) Naohiro Furuya	Y	All
JLOC	Lamborghini	Lamborghini Gallardo RG-3	Lamborghini 07L1 5.0 L V10	88	(Japan) Yuya Sakamoto	Y	6
Team Gaikokuya	Porsche	Porsche 996 GT3-RS	Porsche M96/77 3.6 L F6	70	(Japan) Takehide Maeda	Y	1
Team Gaikokuya	Porsche	Porsche 996 GT3-RS	Porsche M96/77 3.6 L F6	70	(Japan) Yutaka Yamagishi	Y	1–7, 9
Team Gaikokuya	Porsche	Porsche 996 GT3-RS	Porsche M96/77 3.6 L F6	70	(Japan) Akazame Oyaji	Y	2–3
Team Gaikokuya	Porsche	Porsche 996 GT3-RS	Porsche M96/77 3.6 L F6	70	(Japan) Yoshimi Ishibashi	Y	4–7
Team Gaikokuya	Porsche	Porsche 996 GT3-RS	Porsche M96/77 3.6 L F6	70	(Japan) Kazuyoshi Takamizawa	Y	6, 9
Cusco Racing	Subaru	Subaru Impreza WRX STI	Subaru EJ20 2.0 L Turbo F4	77	(Japan) Tetsuya Yamano	D	All
Cusco Racing	Subaru	Subaru Impreza WRX STI	Subaru EJ20 2.0 L Turbo F4	77	(Japan) Kota Sasaki	D	1–7
Cusco Racing	Subaru	Subaru Impreza WRX STI	Subaru EJ20 2.0 L Turbo F4	77	(Netherlands) Carlo van Dam	D	8–9
Team Daishin	Nissan	Nissan Fairlady Z	Nissan VQ35DE 3.5 L V6	81	(Japan) Takayuki Aoki	Y	All
Team Daishin	Nissan	Nissan Fairlady Z	Nissan VQ35DE 3.5 L V6	81	(Japan) Tomonobu Fujii	Y	All
Arktech Motorsports	Porsche	Porsche 986 Boxster	Porsche M96/77 3.6 L F6	110	(Japan) Hidetoshi Mitsusada	K	All
Arktech Motorsports	Porsche	Porsche 986 Boxster	Porsche M96/77 3.6 L F6	110	(Japan) Daisuke Ikeda	K	All
Arktech Motorsports	Porsche	Porsche 986 Boxster	Porsche M96/77 3.6 L F6	111	(Japan) Hiroshi Koizumi	K	1–6
Arktech Motorsports	Porsche	Porsche 986 Boxster	Porsche M96/77 3.6 L F6	111	(Japan) Guts Jyonai	K	1
Arktech Motorsports	Porsche	Porsche 986 Boxster	Porsche M96/77 3.6 L F6	111	(Japan) Tsubasa Kurosawa	K	2–6
Arktech Motorsports	Porsche	Porsche 986 Boxster	Porsche M96/77 3.6 L F6	111	(Hong Kong) Paul Ip	K	6
Tomei Sports	Porsche	Porsche 996 GT3-RS	Porsche M96/77 3.6 L F6	118	(Japan) Takashi Miyamoto	Y	1, 3, 6–9
Tomei Sports	Porsche	Porsche 996 GT3-RS	Porsche M96/77 3.6 L F6	118	(Japan) Takashi Ohi	Y	1
Tomei Sports	Porsche	Porsche 996 GT3-RS	Porsche M96/77 3.6 L F6	118	(Japan) Masayuki Kurihara	Y	3, 6–7
Tomei Sports	Porsche	Porsche 996 GT3-RS	Porsche M96/77 3.6 L F6	118	(Japan) Guts Jyonai	Y	6, 8–9
Avanzza Rosso	Vemac	Vemac RD320R	Honda C32B 3.5 L V6	666	(Japan) Shogo Suho	K	1–3, 5–9
Avanzza Rosso	Vemac	Vemac RD320R	Honda C32B 3.5 L V6	666	(Japan) Junichiro Yamashita	K	1–3, 5–9
Avanzza Rosso	Vemac	Vemac RD320R	Honda C32B 3.5 L V6	666	(Japan) Takamori.com	K	6
Studie & Glad with Asada Racing	BMW	BMW Z4 M Coupe	BMW S62B50 4.9 L V8	808	(Japan) Yasushi Kikuchi	Y	6–7, 9
Studie & Glad with Asada Racing	BMW	BMW Z4 M Coupe	BMW S62B50 4.9 L V8	808	(Japan) Shozo Tagahara	Y	6–7, 9

== Schedule ==
Round	Race	Circuit	Date
1	(Japan) Suzuka GT 300 km	Suzuka Circuit	March 16
2	(Japan) Okayama GT 300 km	Okayama International Circuit	April 13
3	(Japan) Fuji GT 500 km	Fuji Speedway	May 4
4	Super GT International Series Malaysia	Sepang International Circuit	June 22
5	(Japan) SUGO GT 300 km	Sportsland SUGO	July 27
6	(Japan) International POKKA 1000km	Suzuka Circuit	August 24
7	(Japan) Motegi GT 300 km	Twin Ring Motegi	September 14
8	(Japan) Autopolis GT 300 km	Autopolis	October 19
9	(Japan) Fuji GT 300 km	Fuji Speedway	November 9

== Season Winners ==
Rd	Circuit	GT500 Winning Team	GT300 Winning Team
Rd	Circuit	GT500 Winning Drivers	GT300 Winning Drivers
1	Suzuka	(Japan) #23 Xanavi Nismo GT-R	(Japan) #7 ORC Amemiya SGC-7
1	Suzuka	(Japan) Satoshi Motoyama (France) Benoît Tréluyer	(Japan) Hiroyuki Iiri (Japan) Ryo Orime
2	Okayama	(Japan) #23 Xanavi Nismo GT-R	(Japan) #43 ARTA Garaiya
2	Okayama	(Japan) Satoshi Motoyama (France) Benoît Tréluyer	(Japan) Morio Nitta (Japan) Shinichi Takagi
3	Mt. Fuji	(Japan) #38 ZENT Cerumo SC430	(Japan) #95 Lightning McQueen apr MR-S
3	Mt. Fuji	(Japan) Yuji Tachikawa (Republic of Ireland) Richard Lyons	(Japan) Kohei Hirate (Japan) Keisuke Kunimoto
4	Kuala Lumpur	(Japan) #24 Woodone ADVAN Clarion GT-R	(Japan) #77 Cusco Dunlop Subaru Impreza
4	Kuala Lumpur	(Brazil) João Paulo de Oliveira (Japan) Seiji Ara	(Japan) Tetsuya Yamano (Japan) Kouta Sasaki
5	Sportsland SUGO	(Japan) #18 Takata DOME NSX	(Japan) #43 ARTA Garaiya
5	Sportsland SUGO	(Japan) Ryō Michigami (Japan) Takashi Kogure	(Japan) Morio Nitta (Japan) Shinichi Takagi
6	Suzuka; Report	(Japan) #12 Calsonic IMPUL GT-R	(Japan) #46 MOLA LEOPALACE Z
6	Suzuka; Report	(Japan) Tsugio Matsuda (France) Sebastien Philippe	(Japan) Kazuki Hoshino (Japan) Hironobu Yasuda
7	Motegi	(Japan) #3 Yellow Hat YMS Tomica GT-R	(Japan) #19 WedsSport IS350
7	Motegi	(Italy) Ronnie Quintarelli (Japan) Naoki Yokomizo	(Japan) Manabu Orido (Japan) Tsubasa Abe
8	Autopolis	(Japan) #23 Xanavi Nismo GT-R	(Japan) #81 Daishin Advan Z
8	Autopolis	(Japan) Satoshi Motoyama (France) Benoît Tréluyer	(Japan) Takayuki Aoki (Japan) Tomonobu Fujii
9	Mt. Fuji	(Japan) #12 Calsonic IMPUL GT-R	(Japan) #26 Yunker-Power Taisan Porsche 996 GT3
9	Mt. Fuji	(Japan) Tsugio Matsuda (France) Sebastien Philippe	(Japan) Nobuteru Taniguchi (Germany) Dominik Farnbacher

== Standings ==
=== GT500 Drivers ===
Scoring system

Position	1st	2nd	3rd	4th	5th	6th	7th	8th	9th	10th
Points	20	15	11	8	6	5	4	3	2	1
Qualifying	3	2	1							
Fastest lap	1	1	1							

- Only the best four results in the first six races would be counted for the championship.
- There were no points awarded for pole position and fastest lap in the final race.

Rank	Driver	SUZ (Japan)	OKA (Japan)	FUJ (Japan)	SEP (Malaysia)	SUG (Japan)	SUZ (Japan)	MOT (Japan)	AUT (Japan)	FUJ (Japan)	PTS
1 (#23 Xanavi Nismo GT-R)	(Japan) Satoshi Motoyama (France) Benoît Tréluyer	1	1	14	13	14	8	12	1	9	76
2 (#38 ZENT Toyota Team Cerumo SC430)	(Japan) Yuji Tachikawa (United Kingdom) Richard Lyons	4	7	1	Ret	3	9	9	4	2	72
3 (#36 Petronas Toyota Team TOM'S SC430)	(Japan) Juichi Wakisaka (Germany) André Lotterer	3	4	2	7	10	3	3	8	7	63
4 (#12 Calsonic Team Impul Nismo GT-R)	(France) Sébastien Philippe	Ret	2	9	14	12	1	11	10	1	61
5 (#12 Calsonic Team Impul Nismo GT-R)	(Japan) Tsugio Matsuda (Only attempted rounds 1–4, 6–9)	Ret	2	9	14		1	11	10	1	61
6 (#18 Takata Dome Honda NSX)	(Japan) Ryō Michigami (Japan) Takashi Kogure	7	12	3	3	1	12	8	7	14	60
7 (#22 Motul Nismo GT-R)	(Germany) Michael Krumm (Japan) Masataka Yanagida	2	15	15	2	13	4	7	5	11	57
8 (#1 Autobacs Racing Team Aguri Honda NSX)	(Republic of Ireland) Ralph Firman (Japan) Takuya Izawa	14	3	Ret	11	15	13	2	3	12	49
9 (#35 Houzan Toyota Team Kraft Lexus SC430)	(United Kingdom) Peter Dumbreck (Japan) Tatsuya Kataoka	6	6	5	10	2	10	6	15	6	45
10 (#32 Nakajima Racing Epson Honda NSX)	(France) Loïc Duval (Japan) Katsuyuki Hiranaka	10	5	7	Ret	Ret	11	5	2	4	43
11 (#100 Team Kunimitsu Raybrig Honda NSX)	(Japan) Yuji Ide (Japan) Shinya Hosokawa	13	9	4	5	5	2	16	9	Ret	41
12 (#3 Hasemi Motorsport Yellow Hat YMS Tomica Nismo GT-R)	(Italy) Ronnie Quintarelli (Japan) Naoki Yokomizo	15	10	15	9	11	5	1	6	13	39
13 (#6 ENEOS Toyota Team LeMans Lexus SC430)	(Sweden) Björn Wirdheim	9	13	6	8	7	6	4	14	3	39
14 (#24 Kondo Racing Clarion Nismo GT-R)	(Brazil) João Paulo de Oliveira (Japan) Seiji Ara	5	8	11	1	8	7	14	16	15	34
15 (#25 Toyota Team Tsuchiya Lexus SC430)	(Japan) Takeshi Tsuchiya (Japan) Hiroaki Ishiura	11	11	8	4	4	14	10	12	8	23
16 (#6 ENEOS Toyota Team LeMans Lexus SC430)	(Japan) Daisuke Ito (Only attempted round 1–4, 9)	9	13	6	8					3	21
17 (#6 ENEOS Toyota Team LeMans Lexus SC430)	(Japan) Akira Iida (only attempted rounds 5–8)					7	6	4	14		20
18 (#100 Team Kunimitsu Raybrig Honda NSX)	(Japan) Kosuke Matsuura (only attempted round 6)						2				19
19 (#17 Real Racing with Leon Honda NSX)	(Japan) Katsutomo Kaneishi (Japan) Toshihiro Kaneishi	8	16	10	6	9	Ret	15	11	Ret	16
20 (#36 Petronas Toyota Team TOM'S SC430)	(Netherlands) Carlo van Dam (only attempted round 6)						3				11
21 (#39 Toyota Team SARD Lexus SC430)	(Japan) Toranosuke Takagi (Portugal) André Couto	12	14	13	12	6	15	13	13	5	11
22 (#12 Calsonic Team Impul Nismo GT-R)	(Germany) Dominik Schwager (only attempted round 5)					12	4				10
23 (#6 ENEOS Toyota Team LeMans Lexus SC430)	(Brazil) Roberto Streit (only attempted round 6)						6				5
24 (#23 Xanavi Nismo GT-R)	(Brazil) Fabio Carbone (only attempted round 6)						8				3
25 (#23 Real Racing with Leon Honda NSX)	(Japan) Koudai Tsukakoshi (only attempted round 6)						Ret				1
Rank	Driver	SUZ (Japan)	OKA (Japan)	FUJ (Japan)	SEP (Malaysia)	SUG (Japan)	SUZ (Japan)	MOT (Japan)	AUT (Japan)	FUJ (Japan)	PTS

Colour	Result
Gold	Winner
Silver	Second place
Bronze	Third place
Green	Points classification
Blue	Non-points classification
Blue	Non-classified finish (NC)
Purple	Retired, not classified (Ret)
Red	Did not qualify (DNQ)
Red	Did not pre-qualify (DNPQ)
Black	Disqualified (DSQ)
White	Did not start (DNS)
White	Withdrew (WD)
White	Race cancelled (C)
Blank	Did not practice (DNP)
Blank	Did not arrive (DNA)
Blank	Excluded (EX)

==== Teams' standings ====
Rank	Team	No.	SUZ (Japan)	OKA (Japan)	FUJ (Japan)	SEP (Malaysia)	SUG (Japan)	SUZ (Japan)	MOT (Japan)	AUT (Japan)	FUJ (Japan)	Pts.
1	Petronas Toyota Team TOM'S	36	3	4	2	7	10	3	3	8	7	94
2	ZENT Toyota Team Cerumo	38	4	7	1	Ret	3	9	9	4	2	93
3	Nismo	23	1	1	14	13	14	8	12	1	9	86
4	Team Impul	12	Ret	2	9	14	12	1	11	10	1	78
5	Dome Racing Team	18	7	12	3	3	1	12	8	7	14	75
6	Nismo	22	2	15	12	2	13	4	7	5	11	69
7	Houzan Toyota Team Kraft	35	6	6	5	10	2	10	6	15	6	68
8	Eneos Toyota Team LeMans	6	9	13	6	8	7	6	4	14	3	64
9	Team Kunimitsu	100	13	9	4	5	5	2	16	9	Ret	60
10	Nakajima Racing	32	10	5	7	Ret	Ret	11	5	2	4	60
11	Kondo Racing	24	5	8	11	1	8	7	14	16	15	56
12	Autobacs Racing Team Aguri	1	14	3	Ret	11	15	13	2	3	12	54
13	Hasemi Motorsport	3	15	10	15	9	11	5	1	6	13	53
14	Toyota Team Tsuchiya	25	11	11	8	4	4	14	10	12	8	44
15	Real Racing with LEON	17	8	16	10	6	9	Ret	15	11	10	30
16	Toyota Team SARD	39	12	14	13	12	6	15	13	13	5	29
Rank	Team	No.	SUZ (Japan)	OKA (Japan)	FUJ (Japan)	SEP (Malaysia)	SUG (Japan)	SUZ (Japan)	MOT (Japan)	AUT (Japan)	FUJ (Japan)	Pts.

=== GT300 Drivers' championship ===
Rank	Driver	No.	SUZ (Japan)	OKA (Japan)	FUJ (Japan)	SEP (Malaysia)	SUG (Japan)	SUZ (Japan)	MOT (Japan)	AUT (Japan)	FUJ (Japan)	Pts.
1	(Japan) Kazuki Hoshino (Japan) Hironobu Yasuda	46	Ret	4	2	2	5	1	7	4	6	78
2	(Japan) Morio Nitta (Japan) Shinichi Takagi	43	5	1	7	12	1	Ret	9	2	9	77
3	(Japan) Nobuteru Taniguchi	26	3	2	Ret	15	7	5	4	15	1	71
4	(Japan) Kazuho Takahashi (Japan) Hiroki Katoh	2	2	9	3	5	10	Ret	2	3	11	68
5	(Japan) Takayuki Aoki (Japan) Tomonobu Fujii	81	4	6	5	10	2	6	11	1	7	62
6	(Japan) Tetsuya Yamano	77	6	3	18	1	14	17	14	6	3	59
7	(Japan) Hiroyuki Iiri (Japan) Ryo Orime	7	1	14	19	3	4	3	13	20	Ret	54
8	(Japan) Shinichi Yamaji	26	3	2	Ret	15	7	5	4	15		51
9	(Japan) Keisuke Kunimoto	95	13	12	1	9	6	2	16	9	Ret	50
10	(Japan) Yuya Sakamoto	31/95	10	11	4	6	3	2	17	11	4	49
11	(Japan) Kota Sasaki	77	6	3	18	1	14	17	14			43
12	(Japan) Manabu Orido (Japan) Tsubasa Abe	19	7	Ret	9	Ret	15	19	1	10	5	40
13	(Japan) Haruki Kurosawa	62	DNS	5	6	8	11	4	12	14	2	38
14	(Japan) Kyosuke Mineo	31/43	10	11	4	6	3	Ret	17	11	4	34
15	(Japan) Kohei Hirate	95	13	12	1	9	6			9	Ret	33
16	(Japan) Shinsuke Shibahara	62	DNS				11	4	12	14	2	24
17	(Japan) Ryohei Sakaguchi (Japan) Masaki Matsushita	4	8	13	8	4	8	Ret	15	7	8	24
18	(Japan) Shogo Mitsuyama	62		5	6	8						22
19	(Germany) Dominik Farnbacher	26									1	20
20	(Japan) Koji Yamanishi (Japan) Atsushi Yogo	66	Ret	8	Ret	7	13	15	3	Ret	19	18
21	(Japan) Mitsuhiro Kinoshita (Japan) Masami Kageyama	33	11	7	17	11	9	Ret	6	5	Ret	18
22	(Japan) Kazuya Oshima	95						2				17
23	(Netherlands) Carlo van Dam	77								6	3	16
24	(Japan) Tetsuya Tanaka (Japan) Masayuki Ueda	11	12	20	12	17	12	7	24	8	12	14
25	(Japan) Hiroyuki Matsumura	7						3				11
26	(Japan) Hidetoshi Mitsusada (Japan) Daisuke Ikeda	110	9	17	11	Ret		Ret	5	13	20	11
27	(Japan) Keita Sawa	26						5				7
28	(Japan) Tetsuji Tamanaka	5	14	10	10	14	Ret	10	10	18	10	5
29	(Japan) Naoya Yamano	5	14	10	10	14	Ret	10	10		10	5
30	(Japan) Hiroshi Koizumi	111	15	21	14	19	16	8	19	Ret		3
31	(Japan) Tsubasa Kurosawa	111		21	14	19	16	8	19	Ret		3
32	(Japan) Takuya Kurosawa (Japan) Takuto Iguchi	52		DNS	Ret	13	17	18	8	12	13	3
33	(Japan) Takashi Inoue	27	18		15			9	18		17	2
34	(South Korea) Hwang Jin Woo	27	18		15			9	18			2
35	(Japan) Yasuhiro Takasaki	27						9			17	2
36	(Japan) Katsuhiko Tsutsui	16/5	16		Ret			10	18		Ret	1
37	(Japan) Yuhi Sekiguchi	19						19				1
-	(Japan) Yutaka Yamagishi	70/170	20	15	20	18	Ret	11	21		16	0
-	(Japan) Yoshimi Ishibashi	70/170				18	Ret	11	21			0
-	(Japan) Kazuyoshi Takamizawa	170						11				0
-	(Japan) Hideshi Matsuda (Japan) Naohiro Furuya	88	DNS	16	16	16	19	12	Ret	19	14	0
-	(Japan) Yuya Sakamoto	88						12				0
-	(Japan) Takashi Miyamoto	118	19		13			16	22	16	15	0
-	(Japan) Shogo Suho (Japan) Junichiro Yamashita	666	17	18	Ret		Ret	13	20	17	Ret	0
-	(Japan) Takamori.com	666						13				0
-	(Japan) Hisashi Wada (Japan) Muneyuki Kurihara	87	DNS	19	Ret	20	18	14	23	21	Ret	0
-	(Japan) Yoshihisa Namekata	87	DNP					14				0
-	(Japan) Guts Jyonai	111/118	15					16		16	15	0
-	(Japan) Akazame Oyaji	70		15	20							0
-	(Japan) Tadao Uematsu	16/4	16		Ret			Ret			Ret	0
-	(Japan) Muneyuki Kurihara	118						16	22			0
-	(Japan) Hideki Yamauchi	52/95						18	16			0
-	(Japan) Koji Aoyama	27									17	0
-	(Japan) Yasushi Kikuchi (Japan) Shozo Tagahara	808						DNP			18	0
-	(Japan) Takashi Ohi	118	19									0
-	(Japan) Takehide Maeda	70	20									0
-	(Japan) Hiroki Yoshimoto	2						Ret				0
-	(Japan) Tatsuya Tanigawa (Japan) Hirofumi Takei	9			DNQ			DNQ			DNQ	0
-	(Japan) Takayuki Matsumoto	9						DNQ				0
-	(Hong Kong) Paul Ip	111						WD				0
Rank	Driver	No.	SUZ (Japan)	OKA (Japan)	FUJ (Japan)	SEP (Malaysia)	SUG (Japan)	SUZ (Japan)	MOT (Japan)	AUT (Japan)	FUJ (Japan)	Pts.

==== GT300 Teams' standings ====
Rank	Team	No.	SUZ (Japan)	OKA (Japan)	FUJ (Japan)	SEP (Malaysia)	SUG (Japan)	SUZ (Japan)	MOT (Japan)	AUT (Japan)	FUJ (Japan)	Pts.
1	MOLA	46	Ret	4	2	2	5	1	7	4	6	104
2	Autobacs Racing Team Aguri	43	5	1	7	12	1	Ret	9	2	9	89
3	Team Daishin	81	4	6	5	10	2	6	11	1	7	85
4	Team Taisan with Nishizawa	26	3	2	Ret	15	7	5	4	15	1	83
5	Cars Tokai Dream28	2	2	9	3	5	10	Ret	2	3	11	82
6	Cusco Racing	77	6	3	18	1	14	17	14	6	3	71
7	RE Amemiya Racing	7	1	14	19	3	4	3	13	20	Ret	66
8	apr	95	13	12	1	9	6	2	16	9	Ret	63
9	WILLCOM R&D Sport	62	DNS	5	6	8	11	4	12	14	2	56
10	apr	31	10	11	4	6	3		17	11	4	52
11	Racing Project Bandoh	19	7	Ret	9	Ret	15	19	1	10	5	48
12	Team Uematsu Nova	4	8	13	8	4	8	Ret	15	7	8	43
13	Hankook KTR	33	11	7	17	11	9	Ret	6	5	Ret	33
14	JLOC	66	Ret	8	Ret	7	13	15	3	Ret	19	28
15	Jim Gainer Racing	11	12	20	12	17	12	7	24	8	12	20
16	Arktech Motorsports	110	9	17	11	Ret		Ret	5	13	20	18
17	Team Mach	5	14	10	10	14	Ret	10	10	18	10	18
18	Team Takeuchi with Shift	52		DNS	Ret	13	17	18	8	12	13	12
19	Arktech Motorsports	111	15	21	14	19	16	8	19	Ret		10
20	Team Shadow	27	18		15			9	18		17	8
21	JLOC	88	DNS	16	16	16	19	12	Ret	19	14	7
22	JLOC	87	DNS	19	Ret	20	18	14	23	21	Ret	6
23	Tomei Sports	118	19		13			16	22	16	15	6
24	Team Gaikokuya	70	20	15	20	18	Ret		21			5
25	Avanzza Rosso	666	17	18	Ret		Ret	13	20	17	Ret	5
26	Team Gaikokuya	170						11			16	2
27	Team Uematsu Nova	16	16		Ret						Ret	1
28	Studie & Glad with Asada Racing	808						DNP			18	1
29	A&S Racing	9			DNQ			DNQ			DNQ	0
Rank	Team	No.	SUZ (Japan)	OKA (Japan)	FUJ (Japan)	SEP (Malaysia)	SUG (Japan)	SUZ (Japan)	MOT (Japan)	AUT (Japan)	FUJ (Japan)	Pts.
