= Sébastien Philippe =

French racing driver (born 1975)

- Nationality: (France) French
- Born: 8 February 1975 (age 51) Villeurbanne, France

Sébastien Philippe (born 8 February 1975) is a French racing driver. He has competed in such series as Super GT and the French Formula Three Championship. Philippe won the All-Japan Formula Three Championship in 2000 and previously had won the 1993 Formula Campus by Renault and Elf season. He also finished runner-up in Super GT's GT500 category in 2006 alongside Shinya Hosokawa.

Philippe currently manages the French motorsport team ART Grand Prix.

== Racing record ==
=== Complete Japanese Formula Three results ===
(key) (Races in bold indicate pole position) (Races in italics indicate fastest lap)

Year	Team	Engine	1	2	3	4	5	6	7	8	9	10	DC	Pts
1999	Inging	Toyota	SUZ; 5	TSU; 11	FUJ; 4	MIN; Ret	FUJ; 2	SUZ; 7	SUG; Ret	TAI; 2	MOT; Ret	SUZ; 2	4th	23
2000	Mugen x Dome Project	Mugen	**SUZ**; 1	TSU; 3	**FUJ**; 1	MIN; 2	TAI; 3	SUZ; 3	SUG; 4	MOT; 2	**SEN**; 1	**SUZ**; 2	1st	49

=== Complete JGTC/Super GT results ===
(key) (Races in bold indicate pole position) (Races in italics indicate fastest lap)

Year	Team	Car	Class	1	2	3	4	5	6	7	8	9	DC	Pts
2001	Mugen x Dome Project	Honda NSX	GT500	TAI; 14	FUJ; 15	SUG; 6	FUJ; 15	MOT; 14	SUZ; 12	MIN; 3			16th	18
2002	Mugen x Dome Project	Honda NSX	GT500	TAI; 2	FUJ; 15	SUG; 16	SEP; 13	FUJ; 6	MOT; 1	MIN; 12	SUZ; 14		9th	47
2003	Takata Dome Racing Team	Honda NSX	GT500	TAI; 3	FUJ; Ret	SUG; 7	FUJ; 8	FUJ; 1	MOT; 14	AUT	SUZ; 2		8th	55
2004	Takata Dome Racing Team	Honda NSX	GT500	TAI; 12	SUG; 12	SEP; 8	TOK; 8	MOT; 15	AUT; 14	SUZ; 12			14th	6
2005	Team Kunimitsu	Honda NSX	GT500	OKA; 10	FUJ; 11	SEP; 10	SUG; Ret	MOT; 1	FUJ; 14	AUT; Ret	SUZ; Ret		13th	26
2006	Team Kunimitsu	Honda NSX	GT500	SUZ; 7	OKA; 2	FUJ; Ret	SEP; 4	SUG; 11	SUZ; 9	**MOT**; 1	AUT; 3	FUJ; 13	2rd	79
2007	Hasemi Motorsport	Nissan Fairlady Z	GT500	SUZ; 10	OKA; 13	FUJ; 4	SEP; 7	SUG; 4	**SUZ**; 8	MOT; 11	AUT; 7	FUJ; 15	12th	30
2008	Team Impul	Nissan GT-R	GT500	SUZ; Ret	OKA; 2	FUJ; 9	SEP; 14	SUG; 12	SUZ; 1	MOT; 11	AUT; 10	FUJ; 1	4th	61
2009	Team Impul	Nissan GT-R	GT500	OKA; 4	SUZ; 3	FUJ; 15	SEP; 7	SUG; 8	SUZ; 5	FUJ; 15	AUT; Ret	MOT; 7	11th	36

=== Complete Suzuka 1000km results ===
Year	Team	Co-Drivers	Car	Class	Laps	Pos.	Class Pos.
2000	(Japan) FIRST RACING	(France) Fabien Giroix (Japan) Masahiro Kimoto	Ferrari 550 GTS	INT	67	DNF	DNF
2001	(Japan) Mugen x Dome Project	(Japan) Katsutomo Kaneishi (Japan) Shinya Hosokawa	Honda NSX	GT500	170	4th	4th
2002	(Japan) Mugen x Dome Project	(Japan) Katsutomo Kaneishi (United Kingdom) Richard Lyons	Honda NSX	GT500	128	DNF	DNF
2003	(Japan) Dome Racing	(Japan) Ryo Michigami	Honda NSX	GT500	173	**1st**	**1st**
2004	(Japan) Dome Racing	(Japan) Ryo Michigami	Honda NSX	GT500	173	**1st**	**1st**
2006	(Japan) Team Kunimitsu	(Japan) Shinya Hosokawa	Honda NSX	GT500	168	9th	9th
2007	(Japan) Hasemi Motor Sport	(Japan) Masataka Yanagida	Nissan Fairlady Z	GT500	170	8th	8th
2008	(Japan) Team Impul	(Japan) Tsugio Matsuda	Nissan GT-R	GT500	173	**1st**	**1st**
2009	(Japan) Team Impul	(Japan) Tsugio Matsuda	Nissan GT-R	GT500	121	5th	5th

Sporting positions
Preceded by Inaugural	Formula Campus Champion; 1993	Succeeded by Franck Montagny
Preceded by Darren Manning	All-Japan Formula Three Champion; 2000	Succeeded by Benoît Tréluyer
