= Vemac RD200 =

Anglo-Japanese sports car

Overview
- Manufacturer: Vemac Car Company
- Production: 2004–c.2008 14 produced
- Assembly: Chelmsford, England
- Designer: Chris Craft, Masao Ono

Body and chassis
- Body style: 2-door roadster
- Layout: Rear mid-engine, rear-wheel drive

Powertrain
- Engine: 2.0 L (1,998 cc) K20A I4
- Power output: 220 PS (162 kW; 217 hp)
- Transmission: 6-speed manual

Dimensions
- Wheelbase: 2,400 mm (94.5 in)
- Length: 3,970 mm (156.3 in)
- Width: 1,720 mm (67.7 in)
- Height: 1,100 mm (43.3 in)
- Curb weight: 890 kg (1,960 lb)

Chronology
- Predecessor: Vemac RD180

The Vemac RD200 (Japanese: ヴィーマック・RD200, Hepburn: Vuimakku RD200) is a low-volume mid-engined sports car developed by the Vemac Car Company that was produced from 2004 to around 2008.

== Description ==
The RD200 was the Vemac Car Company's second automobile offering, replacing the RD180; in contemporary advertisements, the RD200 was borne out of a desire to "bring the RD180 to higher perfection as an on-road car". Sales started in 2004, with the vehicle priced at ¥8,673,000. Sales in the United Kingdom were started in 2007.

The RD200 was last shown off around 2008. Only about 14 cars were produced before production was stopped.

== Specifications ==
The RD200 is produced in England by the Vemac Car Company, based in Chelmsford, Essex. The vehicle is heavily based on the RD180 which replaced it, featuring a steel tube chassis and front and rear double wishbone suspension. The RD200 features AP Racing 4 pot calipers.

The vehicle is powered by a 2.0 L Honda K20A inline-four mated to a six-speed manual transmission. At launch, the RD200 was available in four colors: Italian Red, British Green, Navy Blue, and Grand Prix White, although other colors were available on request, including colors from other car manufacturers. Other options available for the RD200 include custom seats, custom tires and rims from other manufacturers, custom door panel lining, and two types of trunks.
