= Benoît Tréluyer =

French racing driver

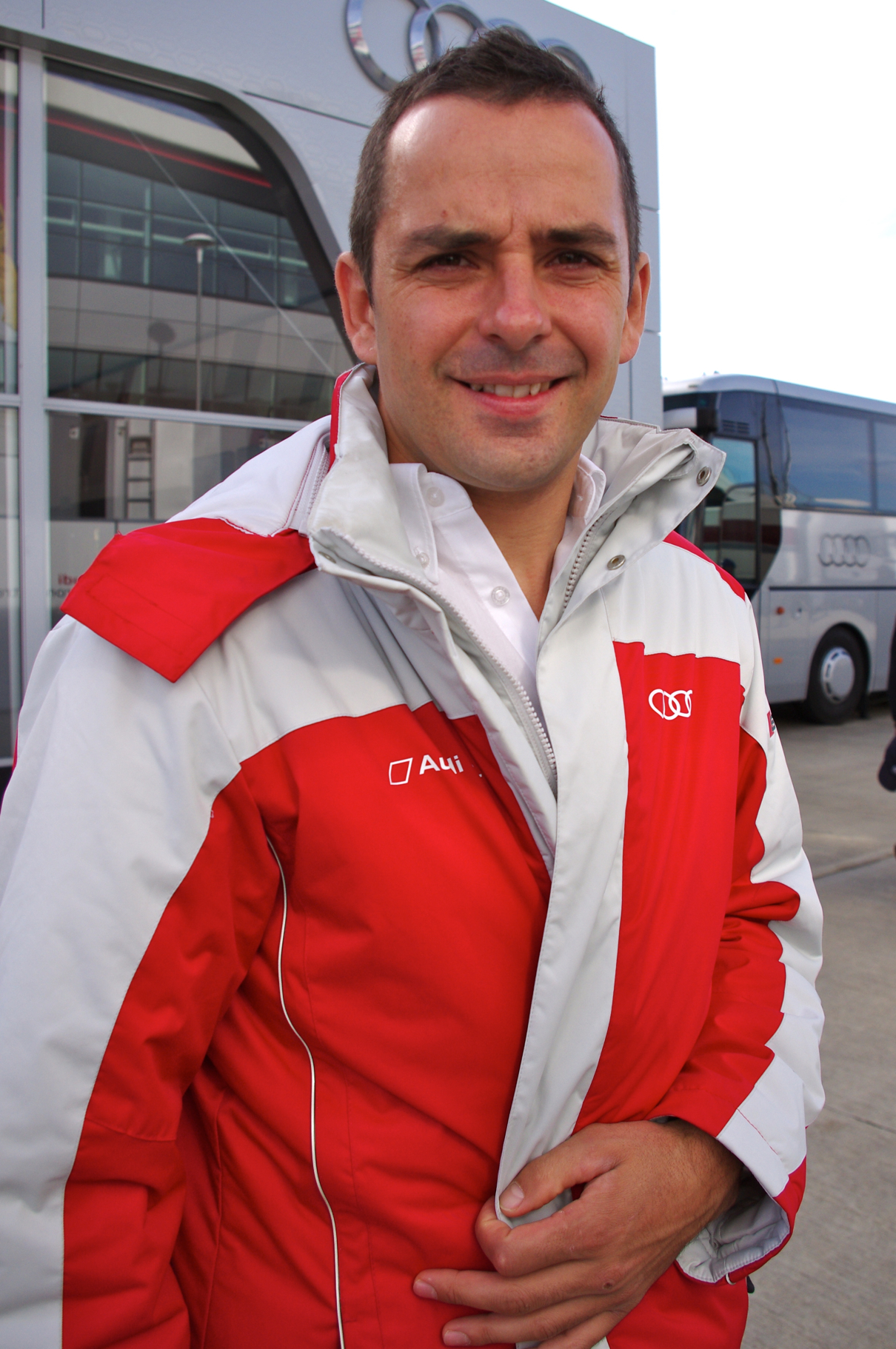
- Tréluyer in 2013
- Nationality: (France) French
- Born: Benoît Jean-Marie Tréluyer; 7 December 1976 (age 49) Alençon, Orne, France
- Categorisation: FIA Platinum (until 2026); FIA Gold (2027–)

24 Hours of Le Mans career
- Years: 2002, 2004, 2007 –
- Teams: Équipe de France FFSA; Pescarolo Sport; Audi Sport Team Joest
- Best finish: 1st (2011, 2012, 2014)
- Class wins: 3 (2011, 2012, 2014)

Benoît Jean-Marie Tréluyer (French pronunciation: [bənwa tʁelyje]; born 7 December 1976) is a French professional racing driver. Tréluyer won the 2007 Formula Nippon title and the 2008 Super GT Series with NISMO, as well as the 24 Hours of Le Mans three times in 2011, 2012 and 2014 for Audi.

== Early career ==
Beginning his motorsport career in motocross and karting, Alençon-born Tréluyer switched to single-seaters in Formula Renault Campus for 1995. He was a race winner in the French Formula Renault championship in 1996, finishing sixth overall in 1997 before moving up to domestic F3 for 1998. He would go on to finish ninth overall in his rookie season and third the following year, and also claimed the European Formula Three Cup at the Pau Circuit in 1999.

== Formula Nippon and Super GT ==
Tréluyer relocated to Asia to contest the Japanese F3 category in 2000, a title he would win in 2001 with 15 wins and 13 pole positions from 19 races. He also finished second in the blue riband Macau GP and third in the F3 World Cup in Korea.

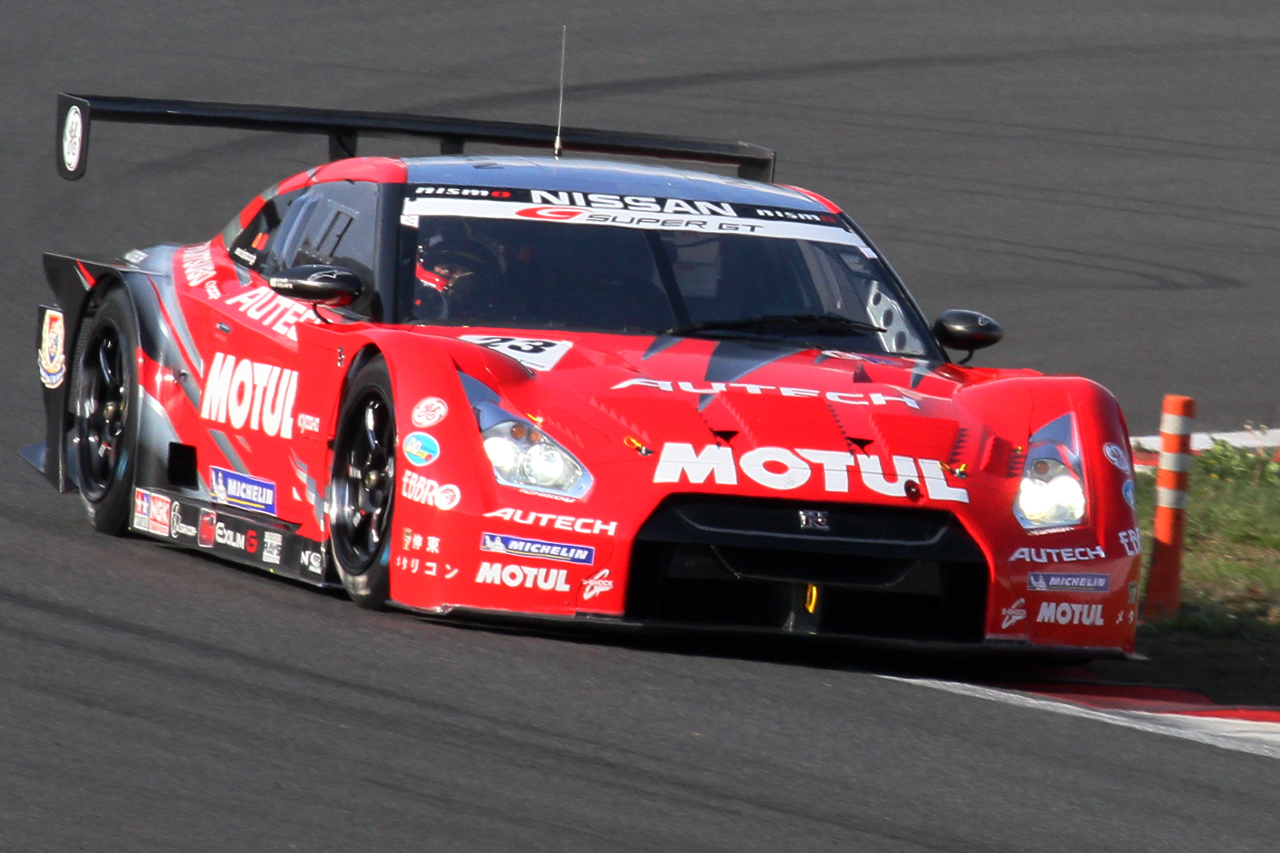
Tréluyer driving the Nissan GT-R GT500 for Nismo at the 2010 Super GT Fuji 400km race

In 2002, Tréluyer graduated from F3 to Formula Nippon, only racing in five rounds. He finished second overall the following season and finally claiming the title in 2006 with four wins from nine races. He would take two more runner-up finishes in the championship (2007 and 2009) before calling time on his single-seater career to focus on sportscar competition.

Throughout his time in Nippon, Tréluyer also competed in Japan's GT category having debuted in the series during the 2001 season aboard a Dome Project Honda NSX. From the next year, he drove for Nissan-backed teams for ten years. He would win the title in 2008 alongside co-driver Satoshi Motoyama and also finished as runner-up in 2011, his final year in Japan before making the factory Audi squad his sole racing priority.

== Endurance racing and Le Mans ==
Tréluyer made his Le Mans 24 Hours debut in 2002, claiming a GT class podium in the Chrysler Viper he shared with fellow countrymen Jonathan Cochet and Jean-Philippe Belloc. He would return to the race in 2004 to contest the premier LMP1 class with legendary French outfit Pescarolo Sport, taking a best finish of fourth overall. During the 2009 race Tréluyer was involved in a frightening accident that saw him transported to the infield care centre at the Circuit de la Sarthe. He was treated and released without serious injury.

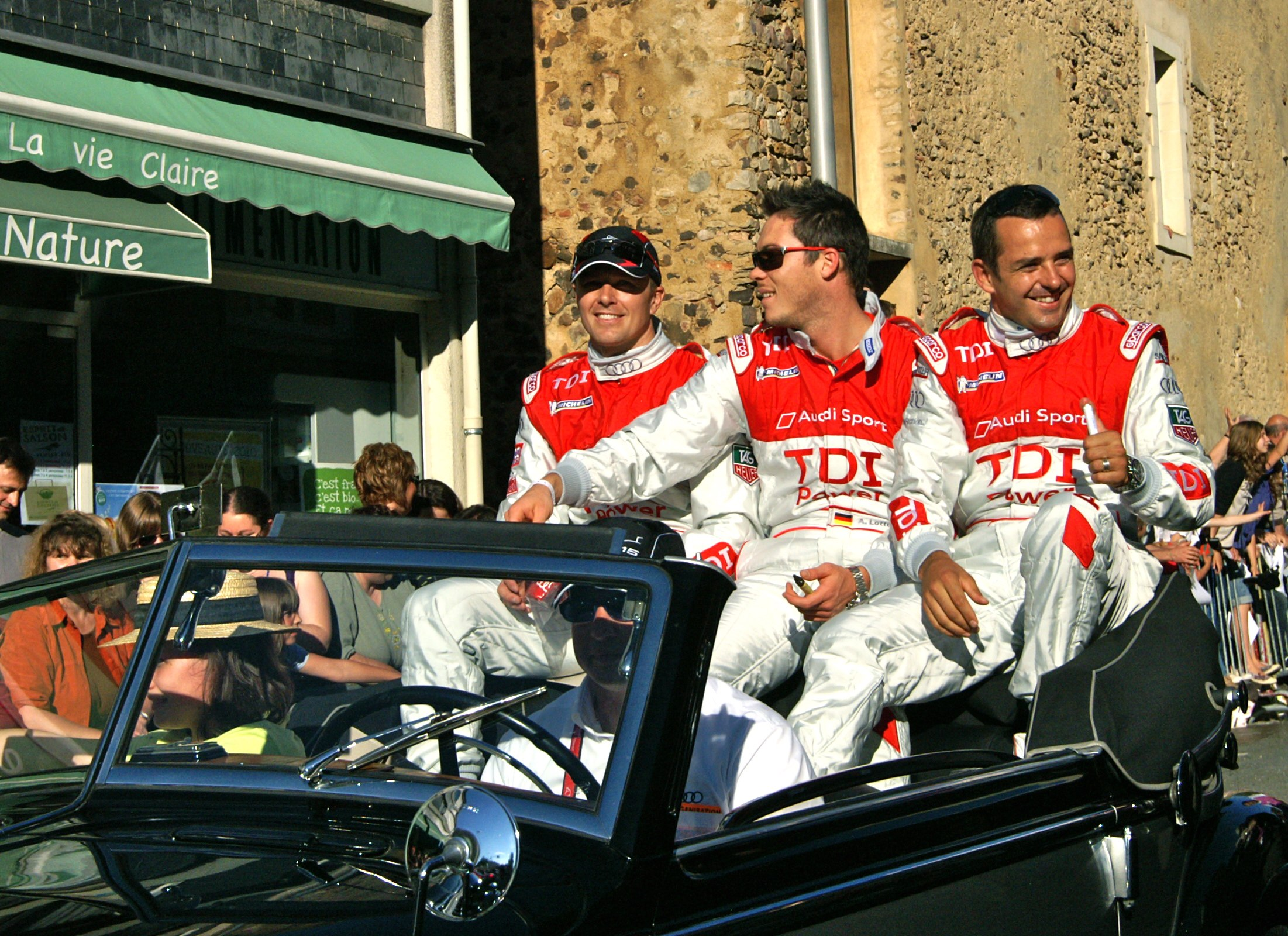
Tréluyer with André Lotterer and Marcel Fässler at the 2010 24 Hours of Le Mans drivers' parade

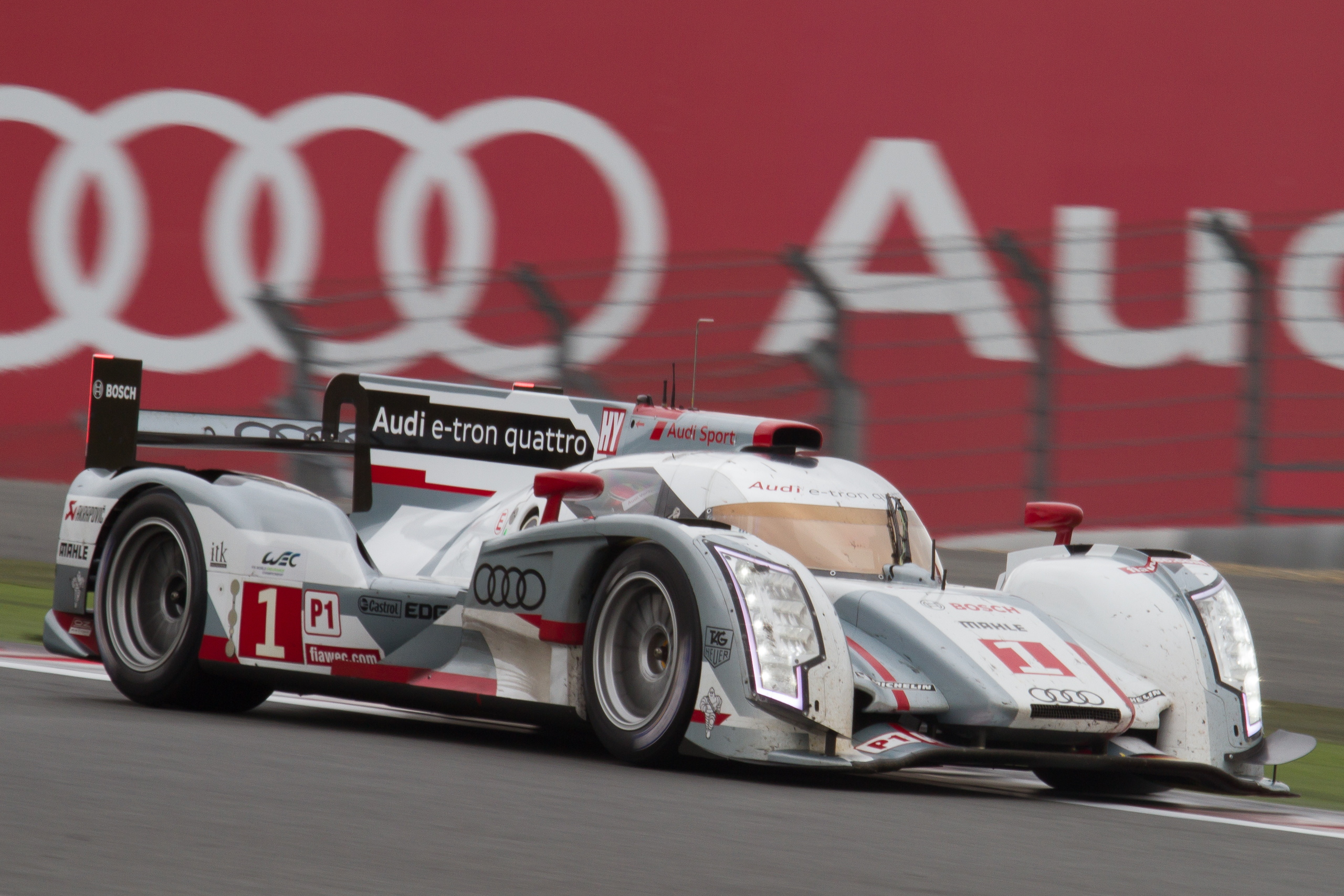
Tréluyer driving the Audi R18 R18 e-tron quattro at the 2012 6 Hours of Fuji

In 2010, Tréluyer joined the factory Audi squad alongside André Lotterer and Marcel Fässler. The trio took second position in their maiden 24 Hours together before triumphing in the 2011 race, holding off the charging Peugeot cars as their fellow Audis both exited in terrifying accidents. They would retain their crown in 2012 piloting the first hybrid-powered car to claim victory at La Sarthe. Tréluyer fell ill on the morning of the race, forcing him to swap shifts with Fässler, but recovered to play his part in the triumph.

Further wins in Great Britain and Bahrain, as well as podiums in Brazil, Japan and China, saw the trio go on to claim the 2012 FIA World Endurance Championship drivers' title, becoming the first recipients of an officially sanctioned world sportscar title in two decades. Afterwards Tréluyer revealed that he was "very proud to finish ahead of Tom Kristensen and Allan McNish who are fantastic drivers."

In March 2013, Tréluyer, along with Audi team-mates Fässler and Oliver Jarvis, took victory at the 12 Hours of Sebring. He also continued to run in the FIA World Endurance Championship that year, once again driving alongside regular partners Lotterer and Fässler.

== Career highlights ==
- 3-time winner of the Le Mans 24 Hours (2011, 2012, 2014)
- FIA World Endurance Champion (2012)
- Winner of 8 other FIA World Endurance races from 2012 to 2015.
- 12 Hours of Sebring winner (2013)
- Japanese Super GT Champion (2008)
- Formula Nippon Champion (2006)
- Japanese Formula Three Champion (2001)
- Pau Grand Prix winner (1999)

== Racing record ==
=== Complete Japanese Formula Three Championship results ===
(key) (Races in bold indicate pole position) (Races in italics indicate fastest lap)

Year	Team	Engine	1	2	3	4	5	6	7	8	9	10	11	12	13	14	15	16	17	18	19	DC	Pts
2000	Inging	Toyota	SUZ; 2	TSU; 16	FUJ; 13	MIN; 4	TAI; 8	SUZ; Ret	**SUG**; 1	MOT; 7	SEN; 2	SUZ; Ret										5th	24
2001	Mugen x Dome Project	Mugen	SUZ; 1; 1	SUZ; 2; 2	**TSU**; **1**; 1	**TSU**; **2**; 1	**FUJ**; **1**; 2	**FUJ**; **2** Ret	**MIN**; **1**; 1	**MIN**; **2**; 1	**MOT**; **1**; 1	**MOT**; **2**; 1	SUZ; 2	**SUG**; **1**; 1	**SUG**; **2**; 1	**SEN**; **1**; 1	**SEN**; **2**; 1	**TAI**; **1**; 1	**TAI**; **2**; 1	MOT; 1; 1	**MOT**; **2**; 1	1st	260

=== Complete JGTC/Super GT results ===
(key) (Races in bold indicate pole position) (Races in italics indicate fastest lap)

Year	Team	Car	Class	1	2	3	4	5	6	7	8	9	DC	Pts	Ref
2001	Dome x Mugen Project	Honda NSX	GT500	TAI	FUJ	SUG	FUJ	MOT; 14	SUZ; 12	MIN; 3			18th	12	
2002	Impul	Nissan Skyline GT-R	GT500	TAI	FUJ	SUG	SEP	FUJ	MOT; 11	MIN; 13	SUZ; 17		28th	1	
2003	Impul	Nissan Skyline GT-R	GT500	TAI; 12	FUJ; 2	SUG; Ret	FUJ; 1	FUJ; 16	MOT; 6	AUT; 11	SUZ; 1		4th	64	
2004	Impul	Nissan Z	GT500	TAI; 8	SUG; 10	**SEP**; Ret	TOK; 11	MOT; Ret	AUT; 5	SUZ; 1			11th	35	
2005	Impul	Nissan Z	GT500	OKA; Ret	FUJ; 15	SEP; 8	**SUG**; 5	MOT; 3	FUJ; 13	AUT; 4	SUZ; 9		11th	35	
2006	Impul	Nissan Z	GT500	SUZ; 13	OKA; 6	FUJ; 5	SEP; 3	SUG; 6	**SUZ**; 1	MOT; 13	AUT; 4	FUJ; 12	8th	67	
2007	Impul	Nissan Z	GT500	SUZ; 11	OKA; 8	FUJ; 10	SEP; 3	SUG	SUZ; Ret	MOT; Ret	AUT; Ret	**FUJ**; 2	13th	30	
2008	NISMO	Nissan GT-R	GT500	SUZ; 1	**OKA**; 1	FUJ; 14	SEP; 13	SUG; 14	SUZ; 8	MOT; 12	**AUT**; 1	FUJ; 9	**1st**	**76**	
2009	NISMO	Nissan GT-R	GT500	OKA; 13	**SUZ**; 11	**FUJ**; 1	**SEP**; 8	SUG; 1	SUZ	FUJ; 2	AUT; 2	MOT; 14	4th	73	
2010	NISMO	Nissan GT-R	GT500	SUZ; 8	OKA; Ret	FUJ; Ret	SEP; 2	**SUG**; 6	SUZ; 2	FUJ; C	MOT; 8		7th	48	
2011	NISMO	Nissan GT-R	GT500	OKA; 5	FUJ; 1	SEP; 14	SUG; 12	SUZ; 4	FUJ; 6	AUT; 1	MOT; 1		**2nd**	**79**	

=== Complete Formula Nippon results ===
Year	Entrant	1	2	3	4	5	6	7	8	9	10	11	DC	Points
2002	COSMO OIL CERUMO	SUZ; 11	FUJ; Ret	MIN; 6	SUZ; 7	MOT; 7	SUG	FUJ	MIN	MOT	SUZ		14th	1
2003	IMPUL	SUZ; Ret	FUJ; 2	MIN; Ret	MOT; Ret	SUZ; 2	SUG; 4	FUJ; 1	MIN; 1	MOT; 9	SUZ; Ret		**2nd**	**35**
2004	mobilecast IMPUL	SUZ; Ret	SUG; 6	MOT; 4	SUZ; 2	SUG; 10	**MIN**; 1	SEP; 7	MOT; Ret	SUZ; 1			4th	30
2005	mobilecast IMPUL	MOT; 6	**SUZ**; 9	SUG; Ret	FUJ; 1	SUZ; Ret	**MIN**; DSQ	FUJ; 12	MOT; 11	SUZ; 4			6th	14
2006	mobilecast IMPUL	**FUJ**; 1	**SUZ**; 3	MOT; 2	**SUZ**; 1	AUT; 7	FUJ; 1	SUG; 2	MOT; 1	SUZ; Ret			**1st**	**51**
2007	mobilecast IMPUL	**FUJ**; 1	SUZ; Ret	MOT; 4	OKA; 2	SUZ; Ret	FUJ; 2	SUG; 2	MOT; 3	SUZ; Ret			**2nd**	**45**
2008	LAWSON IMPUL	FUJ; 4	SUZ; 7	MOT; Ret	OKA; 8	SUZ; Ret	SUZ; 13	MOT; 15	MOT; Ret	FUJ; 7	FUJ; 2	SUG; 4	8th	27
2009	LAWSON IMPUL	FUJ; 1	**SUZ**; 2	MOT; 2	FUJ; Ret	SUZ; 3	MOT; 3	AUT; 8	SUG; 9				**2nd**	**40**

=== 24 Hours of Le Mans results ===
Year	Team	Co-Drivers	Car	Class	Laps	Pos.	Class Pos.
2002	Equipe de France FFSA; Oreca	(France) Jonathan Cochet (France) Jean-Philippe Belloc	Chrysler Viper GTS-R	GTS	326	14th	**3rd**
2004	(France) Pescarolo Sport	(France) Soheil Ayari (France) Érik Comas	Pescarolo C60-Judd	LMP1	361	4th	4th
2007	(France) Pescarolo Sport	(Switzerland) Harold Primat (France) Christophe Tinseau	Pescarolo 01-Judd	LMP1	325	13th	6th
2008	(France) Pescarolo Sport	(France) Christophe Tinseau (Switzerland) Harold Primat	Pescarolo 01-Judd	LMP1	362	7th	7th
2009	(France) Pescarolo Sport	(France) Simon Pagenaud (France) Jean-Christophe Boullion	Peugeot 908 HDi FAP	LMP1	210	DNF	DNF
2010	(Germany) Audi Sport Team Joest	(Germany) André Lotterer (Switzerland) Marcel Fässler	Audi R15 TDI plus	LMP1	396	**2nd**	**2nd**
2011	(Germany) Audi Sport Team Joest	(Germany) André Lotterer (Switzerland) Marcel Fässler	Audi R18 TDI	LMP1	355	**1st**	**1st**
2012	(Germany) Audi Sport Team Joest	(Germany) André Lotterer (Switzerland) Marcel Fässler	Audi R18 e-tron quattro	LMP1	378	**1st**	**1st**
2013	(Germany) Audi Sport Team Joest	(Germany) André Lotterer (Switzerland) Marcel Fässler	Audi R18 e-tron quattro	LMP1	338	5th	5th
2014	(Germany) Audi Sport Team Joest	(Germany) André Lotterer (Switzerland) Marcel Fässler	Audi R18 e-tron quattro	LMP1-H	379	**1st**	**1st**
2015	(Germany) Audi Sport Team Joest	(Germany) André Lotterer (Switzerland) Marcel Fässler	Audi R18 e-tron quattro	LMP1	393	**3rd**	**3rd**
2016	(Germany) Audi Sport Team Joest	(Switzerland) Marcel Fässler (Germany) André Lotterer	Audi R18	LMP1	367	4th	4th

=== Complete FIA World Endurance Championship results ===
Year	Entrant	Class	Chassis	Engine	1	2	3	4	5	6	7	8	9	Rank	Points
2012	Audi Sport Team Joest	LMP1	Audi R18 e-tron quattro	Audi TDI 3.7L Turbo V6 (Hybrid Diesel)	**SEB**; 11	SPA; 2	**LMS**; 1	**SIL**; 1	SÃO; 2	BHR; 1	FUJ; 2	SHA; 3		1st	172.5
2013	Audi Sport Team Joest	LMP1	Audi R18 e-tron quattro	Audi TDI 3.7L Turbo V6 (Hybrid Diesel)	SIL; 2	**SPA**; 1	LMS; 5	**SÃO**; 1	COA; 3	**FUJ**; 14	SHA; 1	BHR; 2		2nd	149.25
2014	Audi Sport Team Joest	LMP1	Audi R18 e-tron quattro	Audi TDI 4.0 L Turbo V6 (Hybrid Diesel)	SIL; Ret	SPA; 5	LMS; 1	COA; 1	FUJ; 6	SHA; 4	BHR; 4	SÃO; 5		2nd	127
2015	Audi Sport Team Joest	LMP1	Audi R18 e-tron quattro	Audi TDI 4.0 L Turbo V6 (Hybrid Diesel)	SIL; 1	SPA; 1	LMS; 3	NÜR; 3	COA; 2	FUJ; 3	SHA; 3	BHR; 2		2nd	161
2016	Audi Sport Team Joest	LMP1	Audi R18	Audi TDI 4.0 L Turbo Diesel V6 (Hybrid)	**SIL**; EX	SPA; 5	LMS; 4	NÜR	MEX; WD	**COA**; 6	FUJ; Ret	SHA; 6	BHR; 2	6th	70

== Notes ==
Sporting positions
Preceded by Alessandro Zanardi (1990 European Cup); Juan Pablo Montoya (1998 Pau)	FIA European Formula Three Cup; Pau Grand Prix; Winner; 1999	Succeeded by Jonathan Cochet
Preceded by Sebastien Philippe	Japanese Formula 3 Championship; Champion; 2001	Succeeded by Takashi Kogure
Preceded by Satoshi Motoyama	Formula Nippon; Champion; 2006	Succeeded by Tsugio Matsuda
Preceded by Daisuke Itō; Ralph Firman	Super GT; GT500 Champion; 2008; With: Satoshi Motoyama	Succeeded by Juichi Wakisaka; André Lotterer
Preceded by Timo Bernhard; Romain Dumas; Mike Rockenfeller	Winner of the 24 Hours of Le Mans; 2011–2012; With: André Lotterer & Marcel Fässler	Succeeded by Allan McNish; Tom Kristensen; Loïc Duval
Preceded by Inaugural	FIA World Endurance Champion; 2012; With: André Lotterer & Marcel Fässler	Succeeded by Allan McNish; Tom Kristensen; Loïc Duval
Preceded by Allan McNish; Tom Kristensen; Loïc Duval	Winner of the 24 Hours of Le Mans; 2014; With: André Lotterer & Marcel Fässler	Succeeded by Earl Bamber; Nico Hülkenberg; Nick Tandy
