= Vemac RD180 =

Anglo-Japanese sports car

Overview
- Manufacturer: Vemac Car Company
- Production: 2000–2004
- Assembly: Chelmsford, England
- Designer: Chris Craft, Masao Ono

Body and chassis
- Body style: 2-door roadster
- Layout: Rear mid-engine, rear-wheel drive

Powertrain
- Engine: 1.8 L (1,797 cc) B18C I4
- Power output: 180 PS (132 kW; 178 hp)
- Transmission: 5-speed manual

Dimensions
- Wheelbase: 2,400 mm (94.5 in)
- Length: 3,900 mm (153.5 in)
- Width: 1,720 mm (67.7 in)
- Height: 1,100 mm (43.3 in)
- Curb weight: 950 kg (2,090 lb)

Chronology
- Successor: Vemac RD200

The Vemac RD180 (Japanese: ヴィーマック・RD180, Hepburn: Vuimakku RD180) is a low-volume mid-engined sports car developed by the Vemac Car Company that was produced from 2000 to 2004.

== Description ==
The RD180 was the Vemac Car Company's first automobile offering. First presented in 2000, the car has been described as a "neo-historic sports racing car".

The vehicle was not produced in large numbers, being discontinued in 2004 to make way for its successor, the RD200.

== Specifications ==
The RD180 is produced in England by the Vemac Car Company, based in Chelmsford, Essex.

The vehicle is powered by a 1.8 L Honda B18C inline-four mated to a five-speed manual transmission. The vehicle is based on the Cadwell race car which Tokyo R&D designed. The car's chassis is made of steel tubing, similar to the Cadwell. It features ventilated disc brakes and double wishbone suspension.

== Motorsports ==
Racing versions of the RD180 were also developed for use in the All Japan Grand Touring Car Championship, now known as Super GT. The first iteration, the RD320R, used a Toda Racing-tuned engine from a Honda NSX; successive versions would use different engines in an attempt to increase power. The RD320R started racing in 2002 and competed in over 150 races in Japan.

Changes to the Super GT rule structure were enacted in 2012 to take effect the next season; this would lead to the phasing out of JAF-GT Category C and D vehicles from competition, categories spanning prototype sports cars based on modified sports cars with few or no road-going counterparts. As a result of the rule changes, Vemac's cars are no longer able to race in the series.
