= Richard Lyons (racing driver) =

British racing driver

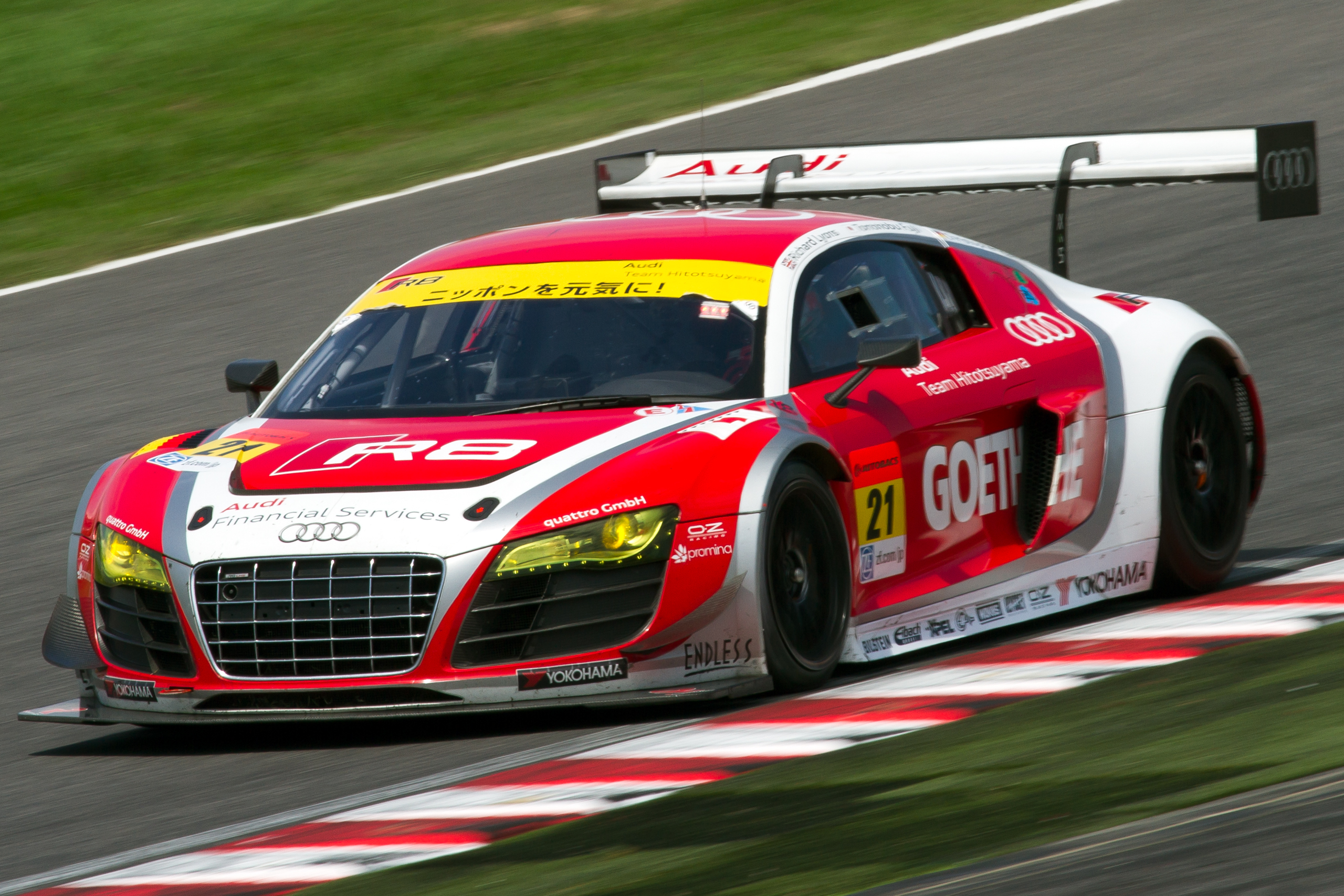
- Nationality: (United Kingdom) British
- Born: Richard William Lyons; 8 August 1979 (age 47) Hillsborough, County Down, Northern Ireland
- Categorisation: FIA Gold (until 2026); FIA Silver (2027–)

Championship titles
- 1996 2004 2004: British Formula Vauxhall Junior – Winter series Formula Nippon; All-Japan GT Championship

Awards
- 1998: Autosport British Club Driver of the Year

Richard William Lyons (born 8 August 1979) is a British motor racing driver that competed in the Japanese Super GT series. In the 2006 Goodwood Festival of Speed Lyons set the fastest shootout time of 49.51 seconds while driving the Nissan 350Z GT500.

== Junior Formula ==
Born in Hillsborough, County Down, Lyons started in Formula Vauxhall Junior in Britain winning the Winter Series in 1996, before finishing the regular championship sixth in 1997 and second in 1998. He then moved to Formula Palmer Audi, finishing second in the 1999 Championship. He drove in Formula Renault 2000 with not much success.

== Formula Nippon / A1 Grand Prix ==
Lyons drove Formula Nippon in Japan from 2001 to 2005 winning the Championship in 2004 and finishing third in 2005.

Lyons has also run in the A1 Grand Prix series for the A1 Team Ireland for the 2006–07 season. He started all up fourteen races with four top-ten finishes.

== Japanese GT's ==
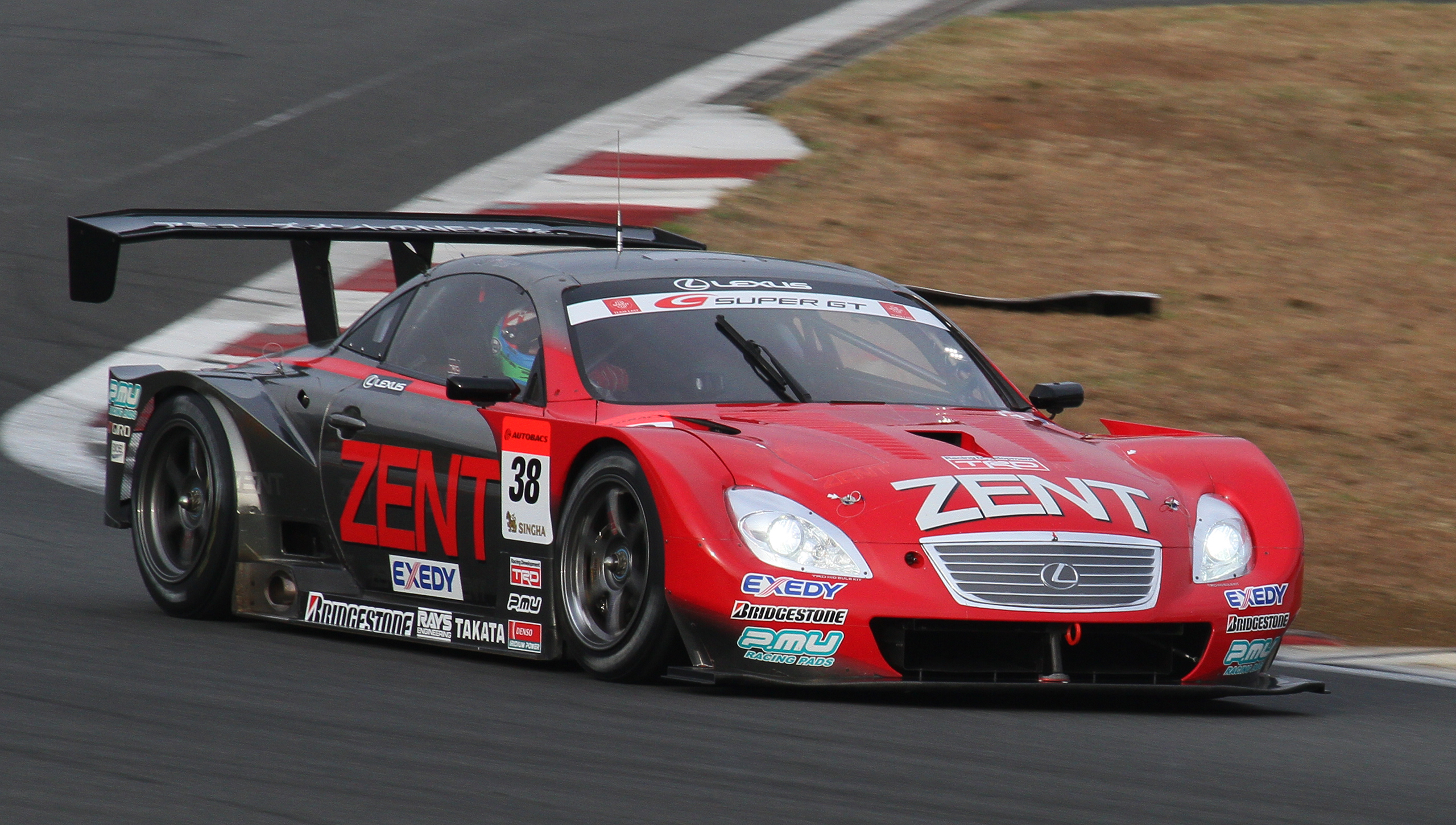
Lyons won the first GT500 race at the 2010 JAF Grand Prix.

Lyons drove GT and Sports Cars in Japan for nine years between 2002 and 2010. His best finish was in 2004 where he won the All-Japan GT Championship in the GT500 class. All in all, he started over seventy races for ten wins in that period.

For 2013, Lyons continued to race in an Audi R8 LMS in the Japanese GT300 Super GT Championship.

== V8 Supercars ==
Lyons also made occasional appearances in V8 Supercar, with a best finish of fifth place sharing a Triple Eight Race Engineering Ford Falcon, in the 2007 Bathurst 1000, sharing the car with Australian-based Danish GT racer Allan Simonsen. He returned in 2011 and drove for Tekno Autosports sharing with Jonathon Webb at Phillip Island and Bathurst. Then he joined Ford Performance Racing to replace an injured Will Power at the 2011 Gold Coast 600, finishing the two races Third and First with Mark Winterbottom.

== Career results ==
=== Complete JGTC/Super GT results ===
(key) (Races in bold indicate pole position) (Races in italics indicate fastest lap)

Year	Team	Car	Class	1	2	3	4	5	6	7	8	9	DC	Points
2002	Dome x Mugen Project	Honda NSX	GT500	TAI; 2	FUJ; 15	SUG; 16	SEP; 13	FUJ; 6	MOT; 1	MIN; 12	SUZ; 14		9th	47
2003	NISMO	Nissan Skyline GT-R	GT500	TAI; 8	FUJ; 1	SUG; 5	FUJ; 2	FUJ; 11	MOT; 13	AUT; 6	SUZ; 4		3rd	65
2004	NISMO	Nissan Z	GT500	TAI; 1	SUG; Ret	SEP; 3	TOK; Ret	MOT; 3	AUT; 1	SUZ; 7			1st	73
2005	NISMO	Nissan Z	GT500	OKA; Ret	FUJ; 4	SEP; 1	SUG; 8	MOT; 6	FUJ; 10	AUT; 6	SUZ; 2		3rd	60
2006	NISMO	Nissan Z	GT500	SUZ	OKA	FUJ	SEP; 2	SUG; 3	SUZ; 2	MOT; 10	AUT; 6	FUJ; 6	10th	62
2007	NISMO	Nissan Z	GT500	SUZ; 2	OKA; Ret	FUJ; 1	SEP; 14	SUG; Ret	SUZ; 3	MOT; 13	AUT; 12	FUJ; 14	8th	48
2008	Team Cerumo	Lexus SC430	GT500	SUZ; 4	OKA; 7	FUJ; 1	SEP; Ret	SUG; 3	SUZ; 9	MOT; 9	AUT; 4	FUJ; 2	2nd	72
2009	Team Cerumo	Lexus SC430	GT500	**OKA**; 6	SUZ; 1	FUJ; 9	SEP; 10	SUG; 10	SUZ; 3	FUJ; 10	**AUT**; 11	MOT; 12	10th	41
2010	Team Cerumo	Lexus SC430	GT500	SUZ; 9	OKA; 2	FUJ; 4	SEP; 6	SUG; 9	SUZ; 6	FUJ; C	MOT; Ret		9th	37
2012	Petronas Lexus Team TOM'S	Lexus SC430	GT500	OKA	FUJ; 4	SEP	SUG						17th	8
2012	Hitotsuyama Racing	Audi R8 LMS	GT300					SUZ; 14	FUJ; Ret	AUT; 6	MOT; 9		20th	7
2013	Hitotsuyama Racing	Audi R8 LMS ultra	GT300	SUZ; 15	FUJ; Ret	SEP; 14	SUG; 8	SUZ; 11	FUJ; 13	FUJ	AUT; 21	MOT; 21	26th	3
2014	Audi Sport Team Hitotsuyama	Audi R8 LMS ultra	GT300	OKA; 8	FUJ	AUT; 18	SUG; 3	FUJ; 23	SUZ; Ret	BUR; Ret	MOT; 4		15th	22
2015	Audi Team Hitotsuyama	Audi R8 LMS ultra	GT300	OKA; 3	FUJ; Ret	CHA; 19	FUJ; 20	SUZ; 5	SUG; 13	AUT; 5	MOT; 8		13th	28
2016	Audi Team Hitotsuyama	Audi R8 LMS (type 4S)	GT300	OKA; 7	FUJ; 7	SUG; Ret	FUJ; 2	SUZ; 6	CHA; 24	MOT; 1	MOT; 4		3rd	57
2017	Audi Team Hitotsuyama	Audi R8 LMS (type 4S)	GT300	OKA; 14	FUJ; 14	AUT; 13	SUG; 20	FUJ; 10	SUZ; Ret	**CHA**; 23	MOT; 8		21st	5
2018	Audi Team Hitotsuyama	Audi R8 LMS	GT300	OKA; Ret	FUJ; 10	SUZ; 23	CHA; Ret	FUJ; 14	SUG; 23	AUT; 14	MOT; 11		22nd	1
2019	Audi Team Hitotsuyama	Audi R8 LMS Evo	GT300	OKA; 13	FUJ; 8	SUZ; 8	CHA; 13	FUJ; 13	AUT; 13	SUG; 7	MOT; 27		24th	10

=== Complete Formula Nippon results ===
(key) (Races in bold indicate pole position) (Races in italics indicate fastest lap)

Year	Entrant	1	2	3	4	5	6	7	8	9	10	11	DC	Points
2001	Team Morinaga NOVA	SUZ; 8	MOT; 8	MIN; Ret	FUJ; 9	SUZ; 11	SUG; 12	FUJ; Ret	MIN; Ret	MOT; 13	SUZ; 12		NC	0
2002	DoCoMo DANDELION	SUZ	FUJ	MIN; 7	SUZ; 8	MOT; 11	SUG; 2	FUJ; 7	MIN; Ret	MOT; 7	SUZ; Ret		10th	6
2003	DoCoMo DANDELION	SUZ; 9	FUJ; Ret	MIN; Ret	MOT; 3	SUZ; 1	SUG; 5	FUJ; Ret	MIN; Ret	MOT; 3	SUZ; 9		6th	20
2004	DoCoMo DANDELION	SUZ; 8	**SUG**; 1	**MOT**; 8	**SUZ**; 1	**SUG**; 4	MIN; 8	SEP; 9	MOT; 2	**SUZ**; 3			**1st**	**33**
2005	DoCoMo DANDELION	MOT; 1	SUZ; 5	SUG; 2	**FUJ**; 4	SUZ; 3	MIN; Ret	**FUJ**; 4	MOT; 13	SUZ; 5			**3rd**	**30**
2008	TP Checker Impul	FUJ	SUZ	MOT	OKA	SUZ1	SUZ2	MOT1	MOT2	FUJ1; 13	FUJ2; 13	SUG	NC	0
2009	DOCOMO TEAM DANDELION RACING	FUJ; Ret	SUZ; 6	MOT; 7	FUJ; 3	SUZ; 13	MOT; Ret	AUT; 10	SUG; 13				10th	11

=== Complete A1 Grand Prix results ===
(key) (Races in bold indicate pole position) (Races in italics indicate fastest lap)

Year	Entrant	1	2	3	4	5	6	7	8	9	10	11	12	13	14	15	16	17	18	19	20	21	22	DC	Points
2006–07	A1 Team Ireland	NED; SPR	NED; FEA	CZE; SPR	CZE; FEA	CHN; SPR	CHN; FEA	MYS; SPR	MYS; FEA	IDN; SPR; 17	IDN; FEA; 12	NZL; SPR; Ret	NZL; FEA; 19	AUS; SPR; 10	AUS; FEA; Ret	RSA; SPR; 6	RSA; FEA; Ret	MEX; SPR; Ret	MEX; FEA; 16	CHN; SPR; 12	CHN; FEA; 5	GBR; SPR; 8	GBR; SPR; DSQ	19th	8

=== V8 Supercar results ===
Year	Team	1	2	3	4	5	6	7	8	9	10	11	12	13	14	15	16	17	18	19	20	21	22	23	24	25	26	27	28	29	30	31	32	33	34	35	36	37	Final pos	Points
2006	Triple Eight Race Engineering	ADE; R1	ADE; R2	PUK; R3	PUK; R4	PUK; R5	BAR; R6	BAR; R7	BAR; R8	WIN; R9	WIN; R10	WIN; R11	HID; R12	HID; R13	HID; R14	QLD; R15	QLD; R16	QLD; R17	ORA; R18	ORA; R19	ORA; R20	SAN; R21; 17	BAT; R22; 12	SUR; R23	SUR; R24	SUR; R25	SYM; R26	SYM; R27	SYM; R28	BHR; R29	BHR; R30	BHR; R31	PHI; R32	PHI; R33	PHI; R34				46th	210
2007	Triple Eight Race Engineering	ADE; R1	ADE; R2	BAR; R3	BAR; R4	BAR; R5	PUK; R6	PUK; R7	PUK; R8	WIN; R9	WIN; R10	WIN; R11	EAS; R12	EAS; R13	EAS; R14	HID; R15	HID; R16	HID; R17	QLD; R18	QLD; R19	QLD; R20	ORA; R21	ORA; R22	ORA; R23	SAN; R24; 10	BAT; R25; 5	SUR; R26	SUR; R27	SUR; R28	BHR; R29	BHR; R30	BHR; R31	SYM; R32	SYM; R33	SYM; R34	PHI; R35	PHI; R36	PHI; R37	24th	63
2011	Tekno Autosports	YMC; R1	YMC; R2	ADE; R3	ADE; R4	HAM; R5	HAM; R6	PER; R7	PER; R8	PER; R9	WIN; R10	WIN; R11	HDV; R12	HDV; R13	TOW; R14	TOW; R15	QLD; R16	QLD; R17	QLD; R18	PHI; Q 25	PHI; R19; 18	BAT; R20; 13																	31st	511
2011	Ford Performance Racing																						SUR; R21; 3	SUR; R22; 1	SYM; R23	SYM; R24	SAN; R25	SAN; R26	SYD; R27	SYD; R28									31st	511
2012	Triple Eight Race Engineering	ADE; R1	ADE; R2	SYM; R3	SYM; R4	HAM; R5	HAM; R6	PER; R7	PER; R8	PER; R9	PHI; R10	PHI; R11	HDV; R12	HDV; R13	TOW; R14	TOW; R15	QLD; R16	QLD; R17	SMP; R18	SMP; R19	SAN; Q	SAN; R20	BAT; R21	SUR; R22; 6	SUR; R23; 6	YMC; R24	YMC; R25	YMC; R26	WIN; R27	WIN; R28	SYD; R29	SYD; R30							NC	0 †

† Not Eligible for points

Sporting positions
Preceded by Satoshi Motoyama	Formula Nippon; Champion; 2004	Succeeded by Satoshi Motoyama
Preceded by Satoshi Motoyama; Michael Krumm	All-Japan Grand Touring Car; GT500 Champion; 2004; With: Satoshi Motoyama	Succeeded by Yuji Tachikawa; Toranosuke Takagi
Awards
Preceded by Doug Bell	Autosport; British Club Driver of the Year; 1998	Succeeded by Andy Priaulx
