= 2004 Formula Nippon Championship =

The 2004 Formula Nippon Championship was the thirty-second season of premier Japanese single-seater racing, and the ninth under the Formula Nippon moniker. Eight teams and 17 drivers competed in the series.

The series was contested over nine rounds at five venues. Fuji Speedway was closed for 2004 due to renovations, and for the first time, the series raced outside of Japan as Sepang International Circuit in Malaysia was added to the calendar.

Dandelion Racing driver Richard Lyons won his first series championship, defeating André Lotterer after scoring more points in the final race of the season, which was the championship tiebreaker. Lyons became the third driver to win the Formula Nippon and All-Japan Grand Touring Car GT500 Championships in the same year.

== Teams and drivers ==
All teams used tyres supplied by Bridgestone, Lola B03/51 chassis, and Mugen MF308 engines.

| Team | # | Driver | Rounds |
|---|---|---|---|
| ADiRECT Team 5ZIGEN | 1 | (Japan) Satoshi Motoyama | All |
| ADiRECT Team 5ZIGEN | 2 | (Japan) Toshihiro Kaneishi | All |
| Yellow Hat Kondo Racing Team | 3 | (Japan) Ryō Michigami | All |
| Yellow Hat Kondo Racing Team | 4 | (Japan) Yuji Tachikawa | All |
| Team LeMans | 7 | (Japan) Juichi Wakisaka | All |
| Team LeMans | 8 | (Japan) Takeshi Tsuchiya | All |
| Cosmo Oil Racing Team Cerumo | 11 | (Japan) Tsugio Matsuda | All |
| Cosmo Oil Racing Team Cerumo | 12 | (Japan) Masami Kageyama | 6–9 |
| mobilecast Team Impul | 19 | (France) Benoît Tréluyer | All |
| mobilecast Team Impul | 20 | (Japan) Yuji Ide | All |
| LeMans Spirit | 25 | (Japan) Tatsuya Kataoka | All |
| Carrozzeria Team MOHN | 27 | (Japan) Koji Yamanishi | 4–5, 8 |
| Carrozzeria Team MOHN | 28 | (Japan) Hideki Noda | All |
| PIAA Nakajima Racing | 31 | (Germany) André Lotterer | All |
| PIAA Nakajima Racing | 32 | (Japan) Takashi Kogure | All |
| DoCoMo Team Dandelion Racing | 40 | (United Kingdom) Richard Lyons | All |
| DoCoMo Team Dandelion Racing | 41 | (Japan) Naoki Hattori | All |

== Race calendar and results ==
| Race | Track | Date | Pole position | Fastest race lap | Winning driver | Winning team |
|---|---|---|---|---|---|---|
| 1 | (Japan) Suzuka Circuit | 28 March | (Japan) Yuji Ide | (United Kingdom) Richard Lyons | (Japan) Takashi Kogure | PIAA Nakajima Racing |
| 2 | (Japan) Sportsland SUGO | 2 May | (United Kingdom) Richard Lyons | (Japan) Takashi Kogure | (United Kingdom) Richard Lyons | DoCoMo Team Dandelion Racing |
| 3 | (Japan) Twin Ring Motegi | 6 June | (United Kingdom) Richard Lyons | (United Kingdom) Richard Lyons | (Germany) André Lotterer | PIAA Nakajima Racing |
| 4 | (Japan) Suzuka Circuit | 4 July | (United Kingdom) Richard Lyons | (Japan) Naoki Hattori | (United Kingdom) Richard Lyons | DoCoMo Team Dandelion Racing |
| 5 | (Japan) Sportsland SUGO | 1 August | (United Kingdom) Richard Lyons | (Japan) Juichi Wakisaka | (Japan) Satoshi Motoyama | ADiRECT Team 5ZIGEN |
| 6 | (Japan) Mine Circuit | 29 August | (France) Benoît Tréluyer | (Japan) Juichi Wakisaka | (France) Benoît Tréluyer | mobilecast Team Impul |
| 7 | (Malaysia) Sepang International Circuit | 19 September | (Germany) André Lotterer | (United Kingdom) Richard Lyons | (Germany) André Lotterer | PIAA Nakajima Racing |
| 8 | (Japan) Twin Ring Motegi | 24 October | (Japan) Juichi Wakisaka | (Germany) André Lotterer | (Japan) Yuji Ide | mobilecast Team Impul |
| 9 | (Japan) Suzuka Circuit | 7 November | (United Kingdom) Richard Lyons | (Japan) Yuji Ide | (France) Benoît Tréluyer | mobilecast Team Impul |

- In Rounds 4 and 7, sprint races set the grid for the main race.
- Round 4 sprint race winner Richard Lyons started from pole in the main race.
- Round 7 sprint race winner André Lotterer started from pole in the main race. Naoki Hattori set pole position for the sprint race.

== Championship standings ==
=== Drivers' Championship ===
Scoring system

| Position | 1st | 2nd | 3rd | 4th | 5th | 6th |
| Points | 10 | 6 | 4 | 3 | 2 | 1 |

| Rank | Name | SUZ (Japan) | SGO (Japan) | MOT (Japan) | SUZ (Japan) | SGO (Japan) | MIN (Japan) | MYS (Malaysia) | MOT (Japan) | SUZ (Japan) | Points |
|---|---|---|---|---|---|---|---|---|---|---|---|
| 1 | (United Kingdom) Richard Lyons | 8 | 1 | 8 | 1 | 4 | 8 | 9 | 2 | 3 | 33 |
| 2 | (Germany) André Lotterer | 2 | 4 | 1 | 8 | Ret | Ret | 1 | 3 | 7 | 33 |
| 3 | (Japan) Yuji Ide | 12 | 2 | 2 | 3 | 7 | 7 | 10 | 1 | 2 | 32 |
| 4 | (France) Benoît Tréluyer | Ret | 6 | 4 | 2 | 10 | 1 | 7 | Ret | 1 | 30 |
| 5 | (Japan) Juichi Wakisaka | 13 | 3 | Ret | 5 | 3 | 2 | 3 | Ret | 4 | 23 |
| 6 | (Japan) Satoshi Motoyama | 5 | 12 | 5 | 4 | 1 | 6 | Ret | 5 | 6 | 21 |
| 7 | (Japan) Takashi Kogure | 1 | 9 | 9 | 7 | 2 | Ret | 6 | 9 | 8 | 17 |
| 8 | (Japan) Tatsuya Kataoka | 10 | 11 | 3 | 13 | Ret | 4 | 5 | 4 | 12 | 12 |
| 9 | (Japan) Naoki Hattori | 7 | 7 | Ret | 10 | 6 | 10 | 2 | Ret | 10 | 7 |
| 10 | (Japan) Ryō Michigami | 3 | 5 | 6 | Ret | Ret | 11 | 8 | 10 | 13 | 7 |
| 11 | (Japan) Tsugio Matsuda | 4 | NC | 12 | 9 | DSQ | 12 | 4 | 6 | Ret | 7 |
| 12 | (Japan) Toshihiro Kaneishi | 6 | 13 | 10 | Ret | 12 | 3 | Ret | Ret | 11 | 5 |
| 13 | (Japan) Takeshi Tsuchiya | 11 | 10 | 7 | 11 | 8 | 5 | Ret | Ret | 5 | 4 |
| 14 | (Japan) Yuji Tachikawa | Ret | NC | Ret | 6 | 5 | 9 | Ret | 7 | 9 | 3 |
| 15 | (Japan) Hideki Noda | 9 | 8 | 11 | Ret | 11 | Ret | Ret | 11 | 14 | 0 |
| 16 | (Japan) Koji Yamanishi | | | | 12 | 9 | | | 8 | | 0 |
| 17 | (Japan) Masami Kageyama | | | | | | Ret | 11 | Ret | 15 | 0 |

=== Teams' Championship ===
| Rank | Team | Car | SUZ (Japan) | SGO (Japan) | MOT (Japan) | SUZ (Japan) | SGO (Japan) | MIN (Japan) | MYS (Malaysia) | MOT (Japan) | SUZ (Japan) | Points |
|---|---|---|---|---|---|---|---|---|---|---|---|---|
| 1 | mobilecast Impul | 19 | Ret | 6 | 4 | 2 | 10 | 1 | 7 | Ret | 1 | 62 |
| 1 | mobilecast Impul | 20 | 12 | 2 | 2 | 3 | 7 | 7 | 10 | 1 | 2 | 62 |
| 2 | PIAA Nakajima | 31 | 2 | 4 | 1 | 8 | Ret | Ret | 1 | 3 | 7 | 50 |
| 2 | PIAA Nakajima | 32 | 1 | 9 | 9 | 7 | 2 | Ret | 6 | 9 | 8 | 50 |
| 3 | DoCoMo Dandelion | 40 | 8 | 1 | 8 | 1 | 4 | 8 | 9 | 2 | 3 | 40 |
| 3 | DoCoMo Dandelion | 41 | 7 | 7 | Ret | 10 | 6 | 10 | 2 | Ret | 10 | 40 |
| 4 | LeMans; LeMans Spirit | 7 | 13 | 3 | Ret | 5 | 3 | 2 | 3 | Ret | 4 | 37 |
| 4 | LeMans; LeMans Spirit | 8 | 11 | 10 | 7 | 11 | 8 | 5 | Ret | Ret | 5 | 37 |
| 4 | LeMans; LeMans Spirit | 25 | 10 | 11 | 3 | 13 | Ret | 4 | 5 | 4 | 12 | 37 |
| 5 | ADiRECT 5ZIGEN | 1 | 5 | 12 | 5 | 4 | 1 | 6 | Ret | 5 | 6 | 26 |
| 5 | ADiRECT 5ZIGEN | 2 | 6 | 13 | 10 | Ret | 12 | 3 | Ret | Ret | 11 | 26 |
| 6 | Yellow Hat Kondo | 3 | 3 | 5 | 6 | Ret | Ret | 11 | 8 | 10 | 13 | 10 |
| 6 | Yellow Hat Kondo | 4 | Ret | NC | Ret | 6 | 5 | 9 | Ret | 7 | 9 | 10 |
| 7 | Cosmo Oil Cerumo | 11 | 4 | NC | 12 | 9 | DSQ | 12 | 4 | 6 | Ret | 7 |
| 7 | Cosmo Oil Cerumo | 12 | | | | | | Ret | 11 | Ret | 15 | 7 |
| 8 | Team MOHN | 27 | | | | 12 | 9 | | | 8 | | 0 |
| 8 | Team MOHN | 28 | 9 | 8 | 11 | Ret | 11 | Ret | Ret | 11 | 14 | 0 |
