= 2000 Japanese Formula 3 Championship =

Seasons
- ← 1999 2001 →

The 2000 Japanese Formula 3 Championship was the 22nd edition of the Japanese Formula 3 Championship. It began on 26 March at Suzuka and ended on 5 November at the same place. French driver Sébastien Philippe took the championship title, winning three from ten races.

== Teams and drivers ==
- All teams were Japanese-registered. All cars were powered by Bridgestone tyres.

Team	No	Driver	Chassis (Note: All drivers competed in Dallara chassis; model listed.)	Engine	Rounds
TOM'S	1	(Austria) Robert Lechner	F300	Toyota-TOM'S 3S-GE	1–9
TOM'S	7	(Japan) Haruki Kurosawa	F300	Toyota-TOM'S 3S-GE	1–9
TOM'S	8	(Japan) Kaichi Sato	F399	Toyota-TOM'S 3S-GE	All
Toda Racing	2	(Japan) Seiji Ara	F300	Toda-Honda MF204B	All
Inging	3	(France) Benoît Tréluyer	F300	Torii-Toyota 3S-GE	All
Inging	5	(Japan) Shinichi Takagi	F399	TOM'S-Toyota 3S-GE	1–9
Team 5Zigen	6	(Japan) Hideki Nishimura	F399	Torii-Toyota 3S-GE	2
Team 5Zigen	6	(Japan) Kota Sasaki	F399	Torii-Toyota 3S-GE	9
Team 5Zigen	15	(Japan) Tadashi Nagamori	F399	Torii-Toyota 3S-GE	1, 3, 5–8, 10
Pal Sport	9	(Japan) Takeshi Tsuchiya	F399	Tomei Nissan SR20VE	1–2, 4–10
Pal Sport	19	(Japan) Tsubasa Kurosawa	F399	Torii-Toyota 3S-GE	1–3
Mugen Dome Project	10	(France) Sébastien Philippe	F300	Mugen-Honda MF204B	All
Mugen Dome Project	11	(Japan) Yuji Ide	F300	Mugen-Honda MF204B	All
Lian Racing Team	17	(Japan) Kota Sasaki	F399	Toda-Honda MF204B	1–4
Lian Racing Team	17	(Japan) Tsubasa Kurosawa	F399	Toda-Honda MF204B	6–10
Team Yellow Hat with Aim Sports	18	(Japan) Shogo Mitsuyama	F399	Torii-Toyota 3S-GE	All
DTM	20	(Japan) Kyousuke Mineo	F399	Toyota-TOM'S 3S-GE	1–4, 7
DTM	20	(Japan) Racer Kashima	F399	Toyota-TOM'S 3S-GE	8–10
Tomei Sport	24	(Japan) Kazuyuki Nishizawa	F399	Toyota-TOM'S 3S-GE	All
Maejima Racing Team	32	(Japan) Masaru Tomizawa	F399	Torii-Toyota 3S-GE	1–3
Now Motor Sports	32	(Japan) Tomoyuki Inoue	F399	Torii-Toyota 3S-GE	9–10
Now Motor Sports	33	(Japan) Akira Yamaguchi	F300	Toyota-TOM'S 3S-GE	All
Nobel France Racing Team	37	(Japan) Motonari Higuchi	F397	Torii-Toyota 3S-GE	2–3, 5, 7–8
Prokidai with Torii Racing	38	(Japan) Yasutaka Gomi	F300	Torii-Toyota 3S-GE	1–2, 4–6
Prokidai with Torii Racing	38	(Japan) Teruyuki Tokuda	F300	Torii-Toyota 3S-GE	7
Prokidai with Torii Racing	38	(Japan) Hirotaka Nakajima	F300	Torii-Toyota 3S-GE	9
Prokidai with Torii Racing	38	(Japan) Kota Sasaki	F300	Torii-Toyota 3S-GE	10
Prokidai with Torii Racing	39	(Japan) Masayuki Suzuki	F397	Torii-Toyota 3S-GE	10
Nakajima Racing	64	(Japan) Yasuyuki Honjyo	F399	Mugen-Honda MF204B	1–8
Nakajima Racing	64	(Japan) Shinya Sato	F399	Mugen-Honda MF204B	9–10
Skill Speed	77	(Japan) Kou Hirano	F399	Toda-Honda MF204B	1–9

== Race calendar and results ==
Round	Circuit	Date	Pole position	Fastest lap	Winning driver	Winning team
1	Suzuka Circuit, Suzuka	26 March	(France) Sébastien Philippe	(France) Sébastien Philippe	(France) Sébastien Philippe	Mugen Dome Project
2	Tsukuba Circuit, Shimotsuma	9 April	(Japan) Yuji Ide	(Japan) Yuji Ide	(Japan) Yuji Ide	Mugen Dome Project
3	Fuji Speedway, Oyama	4 May	(France) Sébastien Philippe	(Japan) Haruki Kurosawa	(France) Sébastien Philippe	Mugen Dome Project
4	Mine Circuit, Mine	21 May	(Austria) Robert Lechner	(France) Benoît Tréluyer	(Austria) Robert Lechner	TOM'S
5	Twin Ring Motegi, Motegi	11 June	(Austria) Robert Lechner	(Japan) Seiji Ara	(Austria) Robert Lechner	TOM'S
6	Suzuka Circuit, Suzuka	2 July	(Japan) Shinichi Takagi	(France) Sébastien Philippe	(Japan) Shinichi Takagi	Inging
7	Sportsland SUGO, Murata	30 July	(France) Benoît Tréluyer	(France) Benoît Tréluyer	(France) Benoît Tréluyer	Inging
8	Twin Ring Motegi, Motegi	20 August	(Japan) Seiji Ara	(Japan) Haruki Kurosawa	(Japan) Haruki Kurosawa	TOM'S
9	Sendai Hi-Land Raceway, Aoba-ku	24 September	(France) Sébastien Philippe	(France) Sébastien Philippe	(France) Sébastien Philippe	Mugen Dome Project
10	Suzuka Circuit, Suzuka	5 November	(France) Sébastien Philippe	(Japan) Yuji Ide	(Japan) Yuji Ide	Mugen Dome Project

== Standings ==
- Points are awarded as follows, with only the best 7 results to count:

1	2	3	4	5	6
9	6	4	3	2	1

Pos	Driver	SUZ	TSU	FUJ	MIN	MOT	SUZ	SUG	MOT	SEN	SUZ	Pts
1	(France) Sébastien Philippe	**1**	3	**1**	2	3	3	4	2	**1**	**2**	49
2	(Japan) Yuji Ide	Ret	**1**	6	3	6	2	5	3	6	1	35
3	(Japan) Seiji Ara	Ret	2	4	5	2	4	3	**9**	3	3	30
4	(Austria) Robert Lechner	Ret	Ret	2	**1**	**1**	6	7	4	8		28
5	(France) Benoît Tréluyer	2	16	13	4	8	Ret	**1**	7	2	Ret	24
6	(Japan) Haruki Kurosawa	Ret	4	7	6	4	5	2	1	7		24
7	(Japan) Shinichi Takagi	4	7	Ret	7	Ret	**1**	13	5	5		16
8	(Japan) Takeshi Tsuchiya	3	Ret		14	Ret	Ret	12	17	4	5	9
9	(Japan) Kyousuke Mineo	7	10	3	13			Ret				4
10	(Japan) Yasuyuki Honjyo	6	8	5	Ret	7	7	6	8			4
11	(Japan) Shinya Sato									12	4	3
12	(Japan) Kaichi Sato	Ret	11	Ret	11	5	8	8	6	11	7	3
13	(Japan) Shogo Mitsuyama	5	13	10	12	9	12	Ret	10	13	10	2
14	(Japan) Kota Sasaki	Ret	6	Ret	8					9	6	2
15	(Japan) Masaru Tomizawa	Ret	5	Ret								2
16	(Japan) Akira Yamaguchi	8	9	11	Ret	11	Ret	11	11	Ret	9	0
17	(Japan) Tsubasa Kurosawa	Ret	17	Ret			11	10	Ret	Ret	8	0
18	(Japan) Kou Hirano	Ret	12	9	9	Ret	9	9	12	Ret		0
19	(Japan) Yasutaka Gomi	Ret	Ret		10	10	10					0
20	(Japan) Tomoyuki Inoue									10	Ret	0
21	(Japan) Tadashi Nagamori	Ret		DNS		12	Ret	Ret	15	11		0
22	(Japan) Motonari Higuchi		14	12		13		14	14			0
23	(Japan) Racer Kashima								16	16	12	0
24	(Japan) Kazuyuki Nishizawa	Ret	Ret	14	Ret	Ret	13	Ret	13	14	Ret	0
25	(Japan) Hideki Nishimura		15									0
26	(Japan) Teruyuki Tokuda							15				0
27	(Japan) Hirotaka Nakajima									15		0
	(Japan) Masayuki Suzuki										Ret	0
Pos	Driver	SUZ	TSU	FUJ	MIN	MOT	SUZ	SUG	MOT	SEN	SUZ	Pts

Colour	Result
Gold	Winner
Silver	Second place
Bronze	Third place
Green	Points classification
Blue	Non-points classification
Blue	Non-classified finish (NC)
Purple	Retired, not classified (Ret)
Red	Did not qualify (DNQ)
Red	Did not pre-qualify (DNPQ)
Black	Disqualified (DSQ)
White	Did not start (DNS)
White	Withdrew (WD)
White	Race cancelled (C)
Blank	Did not practice (DNP)
Blank	Did not arrive (DNA)
Blank	Excluded (EX)

**Bold** – Pole
Italics – Fastest Lap
