= Vemac Car Company =

Anglo-Japanese automobile manufacturer

Vemac
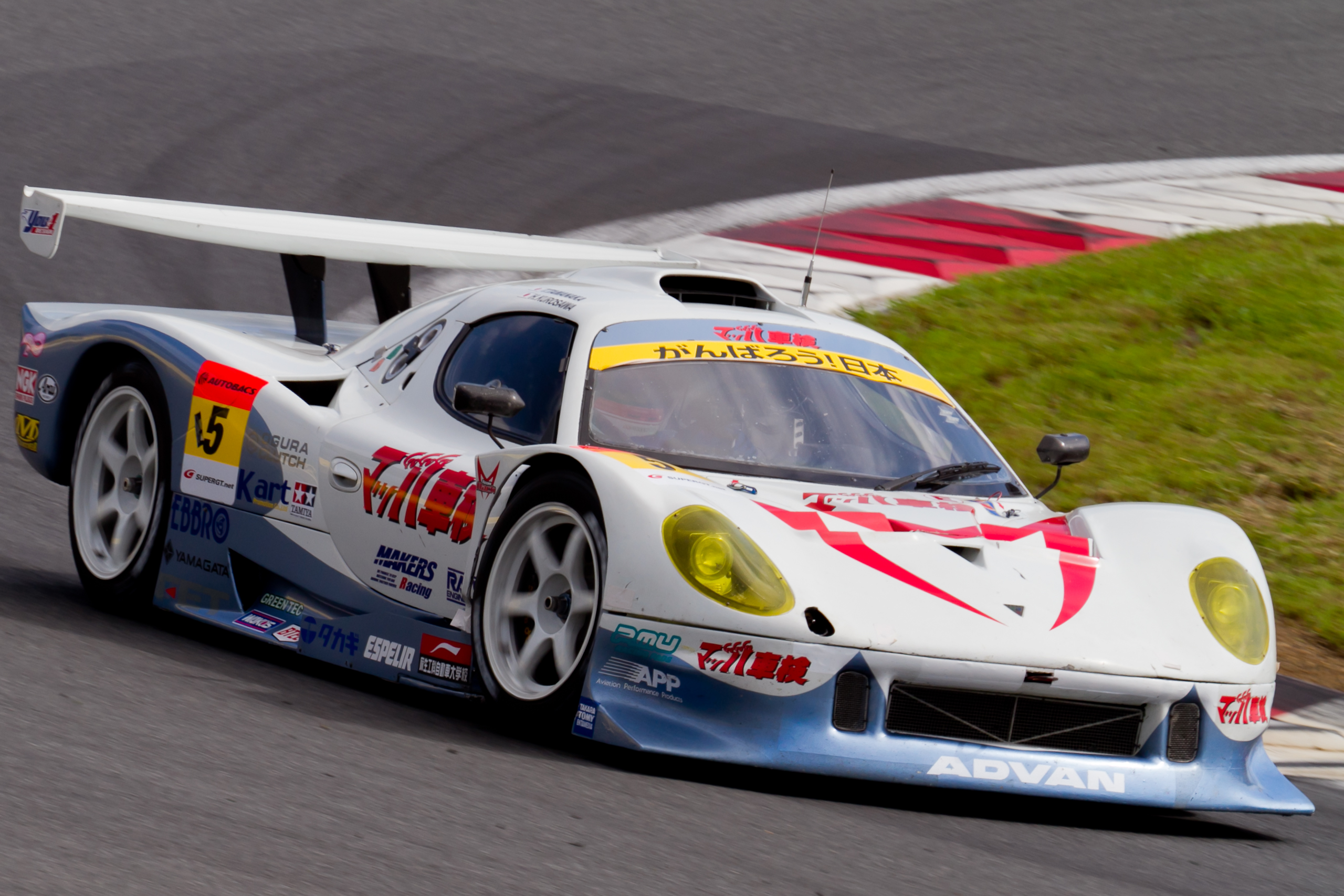
- Vemac RD320R
- Company type: Limited company
- Traded as: Vemac Car Company Ltd.
- Industry: Automotive
- Founded: 1998
- Founder: Masao Ono; Osamu Hatakawa
- Defunct: October 2019
- Headquarters: Chiyoda, Tokyo, Japan
- Area served: Worldwide
- Key people: Chris Craft; Luke Craft; Richard Ward; Vernon Fotheringham
- Parent: Tokyo R&D; Light Car Company; Composite Group
- Website: https://www.tr-d.co.jp/vemaccars/index.html

The Vemac Car Company, Ltd., commonly known simply as Vemac (ヴィーマック, Vuīmakku), was a low-volume British-Japanese car manufacturer. The company is noted today for their construction of race cars used in the All Japan Grand Touring Car Championship (JGTC) and its successor, Super GT.

== History ==
The Vemac Car Company was founded in 1998 by two employees of Tokyo R&D, Osamu Hatakawa and Masao Ono, who sought to make a road-going version of the Cadwell lightweight racing car designed by the company. Vemac was set up in 1998 with the help of Ono's close friend Chris Craft, a racing driver turned engineer. Vemac itself consisted of three parent companies, those being Tokyo R&D, Light Car Company, and Composite Group.

With the help of businessman Vernon Fotheringham, the three designed a car that would be become known as the Vemac RD180; the name "Vemac" came about as a combination of the names of the three individuals who were involved in the car's design (Vernon, Masao, Chris), while the company's logo represents the nationalities of the three individuals. Around that point, the company appointed Richard Ward as their design director.

A sister company, Vemac Car Company Ltd., was later formed and led by Chris's son Luke to produce and sell the car in the United Kingdom; it was based in Chelmsford, Essex. The RD180 was first presented in 2000; described as a "neo-historic sports racing car", it used a Honda-sourced powertrain and entered limited production in the United Kingdom and Japan. The successor to the RD180, known as the RD200, was introduced in 2004 and built by the Light Car Company.

=== Motorsports ===
Vemac entered the Japanese racing scene in 2002, competing in the All Japan Grand Touring Car Championship with R&D Sport, Tokyo R&D's racing team. Using a racing version of the RD180 known as the RD320R, powered by a Toda Racing-tuned Honda C32B V6, the Vemac's first foray into competition was at the first Fuji race of the year in May, with R&D Sport campaigning a single RD320R. In its first season, the RD320R would score three wins and finish second in the Teams' Championship. Development of the RD320R was conducted by Tokyo R&D, with at least one road-going version produced for homologation purposes.

The RD350R, a version of the RD320R powered by a Zytek ZV348 V8, was introduced by R&D Sport for their campaign into the GT500 class in 2003; the team performed poorly, finishing 20th with two points and never competing in GT500 for a full season again.

The next year, the RD408R, a version of the RD320R powered by a Mugen MF408S V8, was introduced in 2004 for a single race in the GT500 class at Suzuka, where it finished 13th. The RD408R campaigned by R&D Sport would win the Fuji GT race in 2006, while the team's RD320R finished third in the championship standings despite recording no wins. The RD408R would win again at Autopolis in 2007 and ultimately finish third in the championship; this would be the last win for a Vemac in the series.

Other teams, such as Team Mach, Team LeyJun, Direxiv Motorsports, and R'Qs Motor Sports, would acquire Vemacs for their use. A hybrid version of the RD408R, the RD408H, was also produced for public sale in 2005 but found no buyers.

In 2012, Super GT's regulations were overhauled, phasing out JAF-GT Category C and D vehicles from competition (categories spanning prototype sports cars based on modified sports cars with minimal or no road-going counterparts) and thus barring Vemac's cars from competition. The company was dissolved in October 2019.

== Vehicles ==
=== Road cars ===
- Vemac RD180 (1998)
- Vemac RD200 (2004)

=== Race cars ===
- Vemac RD320R (2002)
- Vemac RD350R (2003)
- Vemac RD408R (2004)
- Vemac RD408H (2005)
