= 2006 Perth V8 400 =

2006 Supercar Championship event

(Australia) 2006 Perth V8 400
Event Information
- Round 3 of 13 in the 2006 V8 Supercar Championship Series
- Date: 12–14 May 2006
- Location: Perth, Western Australia
- Venue: Barbagallo Raceway

Results
Race 1
Distance	50 laps	120.500 km
Pole position	(Australia) Mark Skaife; Holden Racing Team	55.8667
Winner	(Australia) Mark Skaife; Holden Racing Team	49:00.3114
Race 2
Distance	58 laps	139.780 km
Winner	(Australia) Dean Canto; Garry Rogers Motorsport	57:13.4263
Race 3
Distance	58 laps	139.780 km
Winner	(Australia) Mark Skaife; Holden Racing Team	58:24.7679
Round Results
First	(New Zealand) Steven Richards; Perkins Engineering	290 pts
Second	(Australia) Mark Skaife; Holden Racing Team	286 pts
Third	(Australia) Craig Lowndes; Triple Eight Race Engineering	282 pts

The 2006 Perth V8 400 was a motor race for V8 Supercars held on the weekend of 12–14 May 2006. The event was held at Barbagallo Raceway in Perth, Western Australia, and consisted of three races culminating in 400 kilometres. It was the third round of thirteen in the 2006 V8 Supercar Championship Series.

== Background ==
Britek Motorsports' second car returned to the track after José Fernández' heavy accident in the Adelaide 500, this time with local Sports Sedan driver Tony Ricciardello behind the wheel. The entry's Pukekohe replacement, Mark Porter and his MSport team, returned to the Fujitsu Series.

The only other change occurred at Paul Morris Motorsport; Alan Gurr was back in the teams' Holden Commodore VZ having been replaced by New Zealander Fabian Coulthard at the preceding round across the Tasman.

== Results ==
=== Qualifying ===
Pos.	No.	Driver	Team	Car	Time
1	16	(Australia) Garth Tander	HSV Dealer Team	Holden Commodore VZ	56.0401
2	2	(Australia) Mark Skaife	Holden Racing Team	Holden Commodore VZ	+0.1492
3	22	(Australia) Todd Kelly	Holden Racing Team	Holden Commodore VZ	+0.1874
4	51	(New Zealand) Greg Murphy	Paul Weel Racing	Holden Commodore VZ	+0.3306
5	15	(Australia) Rick Kelly	HSV Dealer Team	Holden Commodore VZ	+0.3629
6	888	(Australia) Craig Lowndes	Triple Eight Race Engineering	Ford Falcon BA	+0.4088
7	5	(Australia) Mark Winterbottom	Ford Performance Racing	Ford Falcon BA	+0.4231
8	7	(New Zealand) Steven Richards	Perkins Engineering	Holden Commodore VZ	+0.4348
9	6	(Australia) Jason Bright	Ford Performance Racing	Ford Falcon BA	+0.4541
10	17	(Australia) Steven Johnson	Dick Johnson Racing	Ford Falcon BA	+0.4566
11	18	(Australia) Will Davison	Dick Johnson Racing	Ford Falcon BA	+0.4747
12	11	(Australia) Paul Dumbrell	Perkins Engineering	Holden Commodore VZ	+0.4756
13	8	(Brazil) Max Wilson	WPS Racing	Ford Falcon BA	+0.5385
14	4	(Australia) James Courtney	Stone Brothers Racing	Ford Falcon BA	+0.5840
15	50	(Australia) Cameron McConville	Paul Weel Racing	Holden Commodore VZ	+0.6076
16	67	(Australia) Paul Morris	Paul Morris Motorsport	Holden Commodore VZ	+0.6509
17	1	(Australia) Russell Ingall	Stone Brothers Racing	Ford Falcon BA	+0.6886
18	55	(Australia) Steve Owen	Rod Nash Racing	Holden Commodore VZ	+0.7361
19	021	(New Zealand) Paul Radisich	Team Kiwi Racing	Holden Commodore VZ	+0.7633
20	3	(New Zealand) Jason Richards	Tasman Motorsport	Holden Commodore VZ	+0.7940
21	88	(Australia) Jamie Whincup	Triple Eight Race Engineering	Ford Falcon BA	+0.8161
22	34	(Australia) Dean Canto	Garry Rogers Motorsport	Holden Commodore VZ	+0.8696
23	23	(Australia) Andrew Jones	Tasman Motorsport	Holden Commodore VZ	+0.9380
24	12	(Australia) John Bowe	Brad Jones Racing	Ford Falcon BA	+1.0115
25	10	(Australia) Jason Bargwanna	WPS Racing	Ford Falcon BA	+1.0478
26	25	(Australia) Warren Luff	Britek Motorsport	Ford Falcon BA	+1.0560
27	39	(Australia) Alan Gurr	Paul Morris Motorsport	Holden Commodore VZ	+1.3064
28	33	(Australia) Lee Holdsworth	Garry Rogers Motorsport	Holden Commodore VZ	+1.3797
29	14	(Australia) Brad Jones	Brad Jones Racing	Ford Falcon BA	+1.4689
30	20	(Australia) Marcus Marshall	Paul Cruickshank Racing	Ford Falcon BA	+1.4793
31	26	(Australia) Tony Ricciardello	Britek Motorsport	Ford Falcon BA	+1.8126

=== Top Ten Shootout ===
Pos.	No.	Driver	Team	Car	Time
1	2	(Australia) Mark Skaife	Holden Racing Team	Holden Commodore VZ	55.8667
2	16	(Australia) Garth Tander	HSV Dealer Team	Holden Commodore VZ	+0.0604
3	22	(Australia) Todd Kelly	Holden Racing Team	Holden Commodore VZ	+0.3312
4	15	(Australia) Rick Kelly	HSV Dealer Team	Holden Commodore VZ	+0.3730
5	888	(Australia) Craig Lowndes	Triple Eight Race Engineering	Ford Falcon BA	+0.4076
6	7	(New Zealand) Steven Richards	Perkins Engineering	Holden Commodore VZ	+0.6484
7	51	(New Zealand) Greg Murphy	Paul Weel Racing	Holden Commodore VZ	+0.6874
8	6	(Australia) Jason Bright	Ford Performance Racing	Ford Falcon BA	+0.7018
9	5	(Australia) Mark Winterbottom	Ford Performance Racing	Ford Falcon BA	+0.8269
10	17	(Australia) Steven Johnson	Dick Johnson Racing	Ford Falcon BA	+0.8543

=== Race 1 ===
Pos.	No.	Driver	Team	Car	Laps	Time/Retired	Grid	Pts.
1	2	(Australia) Mark Skaife	Holden Racing Team	Holden Commodore VZ	50	49:00.3114	1	128
2	7	(New Zealand) Steven Richards	Perkins Engineering	Holden Commodore VZ	50	+0.4609	6	124
3	888	(Australia) Craig Lowndes	Triple Eight Race Engineering	Ford Falcon BA	50	+0.6810	5	120
4	16	(Australia) Garth Tander	HSV Dealer Team	Holden Commodore VZ	50	+1.1123	2	116
5	6	(Australia) Jason Bright	Ford Performance Racing	Ford Falcon BA	50	+1.4786	8	112
6	5	(Australia) Mark Winterbottom	Ford Performance Racing	Ford Falcon BA	50	+6.2393	9	108
7	15	(Australia) Rick Kelly	HSV Dealer Team	Holden Commodore VZ	50	+7.4305	4	104
8	8	(Brazil) Max Wilson	WPS Racing	Ford Falcon BA	50	+21.1999	13	100
9	17	(Australia) Steven Johnson	Dick Johnson Racing	Ford Falcon BA	50	+21.4416	10	96
10	1	(Australia) Russell Ingall	Stone Brothers Racing	Ford Falcon BA	50	+21.4562	17	92
11	11	(Australia) Paul Dumbrell	Perkins Engineering	Holden Commodore VZ	50	+21.8253	12	88
12	4	(Australia) James Courtney	Stone Brothers Racing	Ford Falcon BA	50	+22.5419	14	84
13	50	(Australia) Cameron McConville	Paul Weel Racing	Holden Commodore VZ	50	+22.6972	15	80
14	51	(New Zealand) Greg Murphy	Paul Weel Racing	Holden Commodore VZ	50	+25.4009	7	76
15	10	(Australia) Jason Bargwanna	WPS Racing	Ford Falcon BA	50	+26.1558	25	72
16	18	(Australia) Will Davison	Dick Johnson Racing	Ford Falcon BA	50	+26.5473	11	68
17	55	(Australia) Steve Owen	Rod Nash Racing	Holden Commodore VZ	50	+26.8804	18	64
18	3	(New Zealand) Jason Richards	Tasman Motorsport	Holden Commodore VZ	50	+27.5268	20	60
19	67	(Australia) Paul Morris	Paul Morris Motorsport	Holden Commodore VZ	50	+28.4120	16	56
20	23	(Australia) Andrew Jones	Tasman Motorsport	Holden Commodore VZ	50	+31.2429	23	52
21	88	(Australia) Jamie Whincup	Triple Eight Race Engineering	Ford Falcon BA	50	+32.6532	21	48
22	34	(Australia) Dean Canto	Garry Rogers Motorsport	Holden Commodore VZ	50	+35.5518	22	44
23	25	(Australia) Warren Luff	Britek Motorsport	Ford Falcon BA	50	+41.8765	26	40
24	33	(Australia) Lee Holdsworth	Garry Rogers Motorsport	Holden Commodore VZ	50	+47.8426	28	36
25	12	(Australia) John Bowe	Brad Jones Racing	Ford Falcon BA	50	+51.8122	24	32
26	39	(Australia) Alan Gurr	Paul Morris Motorsport	Holden Commodore VZ	50	+53.7270	27	28
27	14	(Australia) Brad Jones	Brad Jones Racing	Ford Falcon BA	49	+1 Lap	29	24
28	20	(Australia) Marcus Marshall	Paul Cruickshank Racing	Ford Falcon BA	49	+1 Lap	30	20
29	26	(Australia) Tony Ricciardello	Britek Motorsport	Ford Falcon BA	49	+1 Lap	31	16
30	22	(Australia) Todd Kelly	Holden Racing Team	Holden Commodore VZ	45	+5 Laps	3	12
31	021	(New Zealand) Paul Radisich	Team Kiwi Racing	Holden Commodore VZ	45	+5 Laps	19	8
Fastest lap: Todd Kelly (Holden Racing Team), 57.5198

=== Race 2 ===
Pos.	No.	Driver	Team	Car	Laps	Time/Retired	Grid	Pts.
1	34	(Australia) Dean Canto	Garry Rogers Motorsport	Holden Commodore VZ	58	57:13.4263	10	64
2	7	(New Zealand) Steven Richards	Perkins Engineering	Holden Commodore VZ	58	+1.4663	30	62
3	51	(New Zealand) Greg Murphy	Paul Weel Racing	Holden Commodore VZ	58	+2.6490	18	60
4	88	(Australia) Jamie Whincup	Triple Eight Race Engineering	Ford Falcon BA	58	+2.7649	11	58
5	4	(Australia) James Courtney	Stone Brothers Racing	Ford Falcon BA	58	+6.1706	20	56
6	021	(New Zealand) Paul Radisich	Team Kiwi Racing	Holden Commodore VZ	58	+8.3044	1	54
7	23	(Australia) Andrew Jones	Tasman Motorsport	Holden Commodore VZ	58	+11.6166	12	52
8	1	(Australia) Russell Ingall	Stone Brothers Racing	Ford Falcon BA	58	+12.8829	22	50
9	3	(New Zealand) Jason Richards	Tasman Motorsport	Holden Commodore VZ	58	+13.6690	14	48
10	16	(Australia) Garth Tander	HSV Dealer Team	Holden Commodore VZ	58	+14.3248	28	46
11	15	(Australia) Rick Kelly	HSV Dealer Team	Holden Commodore VZ	58	+14.6516	25	44
12	33	(Australia) Lee Holdsworth	Garry Rogers Motorsport	Holden Commodore VZ	58	+16.0840	8	42
13	5	(Australia) Mark Winterbottom	Ford Performance Racing	Ford Falcon BA	58	+16.1545	26	40
14	888	(Australia) Craig Lowndes	Triple Eight Race Engineering	Ford Falcon BA	58	+16.5377	29	38
15	55	(Australia) Steve Owen	Rod Nash Racing	Holden Commodore VZ	58	+20.9543	15	36
16	10	(Australia) Jason Bargwanna	WPS Racing	Ford Falcon BA	58	+22.6251	17	34
17	17	(Australia) Steven Johnson	Dick Johnson Racing	Ford Falcon BA	58	+23.2394	23	32
18	2	(Australia) Mark Skaife	Holden Racing Team	Holden Commodore VZ	58	+23.6195	31	30
19	8	(Brazil) Max Wilson	WPS Racing	Ford Falcon BA	58	+27.8559	24	28
20	11	(Australia) Paul Dumbrell	Perkins Engineering	Holden Commodore VZ	58	+28.2460	21	26
21	67	(Australia) Paul Morris	Paul Morris Motorsport	Holden Commodore VZ	58	+28.5144	13	24
22	18	(Australia) Will Davison	Dick Johnson Racing	Ford Falcon BA	58	+31.6303	16	22
23	39	(Australia) Alan Gurr	Paul Morris Motorsport	Holden Commodore VZ	58	+34.9483	6	20
24	14	(Australia) Brad Jones	Brad Jones Racing	Ford Falcon BA	58	+37.2739	5	18
25	50	(Australia) Cameron McConville	Paul Weel Racing	Holden Commodore VZ	58	+38.6798	19	16
26	25	(Australia) Warren Luff	Britek Motorsport	Ford Falcon BA	57	+1 Lap	9	14
27	26	(Australia) Tony Ricciardello	Britek Motorsport	Ford Falcon BA	57	+1 Lap	3	12
28	22	(Australia) Todd Kelly	Holden Racing Team	Holden Commodore VZ	56	+2 Laps	2	10
Ret	6	(Australia) Jason Bright	Ford Performance Racing	Ford Falcon BA	52	Crash	27	
Ret	12	(Australia) John Bowe	Brad Jones Racing	Ford Falcon BA	43		7	
Ret	20	(Australia) Marcus Marshall	Paul Cruickshank Racing	Ford Falcon BA	28	Steering	4	
Fastest lap: Todd Kelly (Holden Racing Team), 57.4096

=== Race 3 ===
Pos.	No.	Driver	Team	Car	Laps	Time/Retired	Grid	Pts.
1	2	(Australia) Mark Skaife	Holden Racing Team	Holden Commodore VZ	58	58:24.7679	4	128
2	888	(Australia) Craig Lowndes	Triple Eight Race Engineering	Ford Falcon BA	58	+0.6652	3	124
3	5	(Australia) Mark Winterbottom	Ford Performance Racing	Ford Falcon BA	58	+2.7055	6	120
4	22	(Australia) Todd Kelly	Holden Racing Team	Holden Commodore VZ	58	+3.2827	30	116
5	16	(Australia) Garth Tander	HSV Dealer Team	Holden Commodore VZ	58	+3.5633	2	112
6	1	(Australia) Russell Ingall	Stone Brothers Racing	Ford Falcon BA	58	+10.0528	7	108
7	7	(New Zealand) Steven Richards	Perkins Engineering	Holden Commodore VZ	58	+10.5181	1	104
8	3	(New Zealand) Jason Richards	Tasman Motorsport	Holden Commodore VZ	58	+12.6366	15	100
9	88	(Australia) Jamie Whincup	Triple Eight Race Engineering	Ford Falcon BA	58	+13.7725	16	96
10	17	(Australia) Steven Johnson	Dick Johnson Racing	Ford Falcon BA	58	+14.5604	10	92
11	50	(Australia) Cameron McConville	Paul Weel Racing	Holden Commodore VZ	58	+14.5810	20	88
12	11	(Australia) Paul Dumbrell	Perkins Engineering	Holden Commodore VZ	58	+16.6426	12	84
13	55	(Australia) Steve Owen	Rod Nash Racing	Holden Commodore VZ	58	+18.2739	19	80
14	15	(Australia) Rick Kelly	HSV Dealer Team	Holden Commodore VZ	58	+19.0230	5	76
15	021	(New Zealand) Paul Radisich	Team Kiwi Racing	Holden Commodore VZ	58	+22.9977	24	72
16	18	(Australia) Will Davison	Dick Johnson Racing	Ford Falcon BA	58	+23.2502	21	68
17	39	(Australia) Alan Gurr	Paul Morris Motorsport	Holden Commodore VZ	58	+26.3637	26	64
18	23	(Australia) Andrew Jones	Tasman Motorsport	Holden Commodore VZ	58	+27.0892	18	60
19	51	(New Zealand) Greg Murphy	Paul Weel Racing	Holden Commodore VZ	58	+30.3115	9	56
20	10	(Australia) Jason Bargwanna	WPS Racing	Holden Commodore VZ	58	+33.9339	17	52
21	12	(Australia) John Bowe	Brad Jones Racing	Ford Falcon BA	58	+34.1764	28	48
22	34	(Australia) Dean Canto	Garry Rogers Motorsport	Holden Commodore VZ	58	+34.7252	14	44
23	14	(Australia) Brad Jones	Brad Jones Racing	Ford Falcon BA	58	+52.4033	27	40
24	33	(Australia) Lee Holdsworth	Garry Rogers Motorsport	Holden Commodore VZ	57	+1 Lap	23	36
25	67	(Australia) Paul Morris	Paul Morris Motorsport	Holden Commodore VZ	57	+1 Lap	22	32
26	20	(Australia) Marcus Marshall	Paul Cruickshank Racing	Ford Falcon BA	57	+1 Lap	31	28
27	25	(Australia) Warren Luff	Britek Motorsport	Ford Falcon BA	57	+1 Lap	25	24
28	6	(Australia) Jason Bright	Ford Performance Racing	Ford Falcon BA	55	+3 Laps	13	20
Ret	4	(Australia) James Courtney	Stone Brothers Racing	Ford Falcon BA	29	Engine	8	
Ret	26	(Australia) Tony Ricciardello	Britek Motorsport	Ford Falcon BA	19		29	
Ret	8	(Brazil) Max Wilson	WPS Racing	Ford Falcon BA	18	Suspension	11	
Fastest lap: Garth Tander (HSV Dealer Team), 57.2925

== Round standings ==
Pos.	Driver	R1	R2	R3	Total
1	(New Zealand) Steven Richards	2	2	7	290
2	(Australia) Mark Skaife	1	18	1	286
3	(Australia) Craig Lowndes	3	14	2	282
4	(Australia) Garth Tander	4	10	5	274
5	(Australia) Mark Winterbottom	6	13	3	268
6	(Australia) Russell Ingall	10	8	6	250
7	(Australia) Rick Kelly	7	11	14	224
8	(Australia) Steven Johnson	9	17	10	220
9	(New Zealand) Jason Richards	18	9	8	208
10	(Australia) Jamie Whincup	21	4	9	202
11	(Australia) Paul Dumbrell	11	20	12	198
12	(New Zealand) Greg Murphy	14	3	19	192
13	(Australia) Cameron McConville	13	25	11	184
14	(Australia) Steve Owen	17	15	13	180
15	(Australia) Andrew Jones	20	7	18	164
16	(Australia) Will Davison	16	22	16	158
=	(Australia) Jason Bargwanna	15	16	20	158
18	(Australia) Dean Canto	22	1	22	152
19	(Australia) James Courtney	12	5	Ret	140
20	(Australia) Todd Kelly	30	28	4	138
21	(New Zealand) Paul Radisich	31	6	15	134
22	(Australia) Jason Bright	5	Ret	28	132
23	(Brazil) Max Wilson	8	19	Ret	128
24	(Australia) Lee Holdsworth	24	12	24	114
25	(Australia) Alan Gurr	26	23	17	112
=	(Australia) Paul Morris	19	21	25	112
27	(Australia) Brad Jones	27	24	23	82
28	(Australia) John Bowe	25	Ret	21	80
29	(Australia) Warren Luff	23	26	27	78
30	(Australia) Marcus Marshall	28	Ret	26	48
31	(Australia) Tony Ricciardello	29	27	Ret	28

== Championship standings ==
Pos.	Driver	Pts	Gap
1	(Australia) Russell Ingall	780	
2	(Australia) Garth Tander	776	-4
3	(New Zealand) Steven Richards	772	-8
4	(Australia) Rick Kelly	763	-17
5	(Australia) Craig Lowndes	710	-70
