= LoveFab Enviate =

Enviate Hypercar
- Category: Pikes Peak Unlimited
- Constructor: Enviate Hypercar
- Designer(s): Cody Loveland

Technical specifications
- Chassis: Acura NSX components (v1.0)(deceased); Chromoly tube components (v2.0)
- Suspension (front): Pushrod suspension with double A-arms
- Suspension (rear): Pushrod suspension with double A-arms
- Engine: LS-based 5.3 L V8, twin-turbocharged
- Transmission: Porsche H-type gearbox
- Weight: 816.5 kg (1,800 lb) (approx.)

Competition history
- Notable entrants: (United States) Team Enviate Hypercar
- Notable drivers: (United States) (United States) Cody Loveland (United States) Paul Gerrard
- Debut: 2017 Pikes Peak International Hillclimb
Races	Wins
1	0
- Teams' Championships: 0
- Constructors' Championships: 0
- Drivers' Championships: 0

The Enviate Hypercar is a racing car built by the LoveFab Race Team, competing for the Pikes Peak International Hill Climb event.

== Nomenclature ==
The use of NSX components and a V8 engine was the inspiration for the name.

The name Enviate was formed with modified pronunciations of the letters N and V, and the number 8. V and 8 come from the V8 engine, whilst the N is from the NSX. All three create the pronunciations en, vee, and eit, which are then loosely modified to create the name.

== Overview ==
=== 1st generation (2013) ===
In 2013, the car was unveiled, and was known as Enviate v1.0. The car was originally created using first generation Honda NSX components, and had an LS-based 6-liter dry-sump-lubricated V8 with Garrett twin-turbochargers, which produced approximately 1,000 hp (746 kW; 1,014 PS). The car's body was built with NSX components and lightweight material. No other information is known about the car.

The car went through minimal testing, until it was ultimately ended after a crash that occurred in the same year.

=== 2nd generation (2013-present) ===
A new car was in development after the original Enviate's crash, called the Enviate Hypercar. This car, using 5.3-liter twin-turbocharged LS V8, produces more than the original car, with over 1,200 hp (895 kW; 1,217 PS) and 1,000 lb⋅ft (1,356 N⋅m). The car is a new ground-up build, utilizing F1 engineers from around the globe. The weight stands at approximately 816.5 kg (1,800 lb). The car's power is driven by a Porsche H-type gearbox. Suspension is a double A-armed, pushrod suspension.

The aerodynamic changes helps the car reach 3,000 kg (6,614 lb) of downforce at 100 mph (161 km/h) and 4,536 kg (10,000 lb) of downforce at 150 mph (241 km/h). The car's downforce is the second highest ever made for a racing car, behind the F1-competing Red Bull RB6 race car, in which it made 5,500 kg (12,125 lb) of downforce. The Aero package was built by Affinity Aero, via F1 level cfd engineering.

The car also uses carbon discs for braking, which is stronger than carbon ceramic brakes.

== Racing history ==
=== 2013 ===
The Enviate v1.0 was scheduled to race in the 2013 Pikes Peak International Hill Climb, until it was forced to withdraw after a crash that essentially destroyed the car. However, the core of the car was still intact, which meant development of a new Enviate could be done whilst using the same parts as before. This also forced the Enviate to stay out of Pikes Peak competition for four whole years.

=== 2017 ===
A new Enviate Hypercar was complete, which meant it was ready to race in Pikes Peak competition. The car finally made its debut, in the 2017 Broadmoor Pikes Peak International Hill Climb, competing in the Unlimited classification. The Enviate's main target was against Romain Dumas and the Norma M20 RD, but the car did not post a faster lap time.
