= All Japan Grand Touring Car Championship =

Auto racing series in Japan

- Category: Gran Turismo
- Country: Japan
- Inaugural season: 1993
- Folded: 2004 (renamed to Super GT)
- Last Drivers' champion: GT500: (Japan) Satoshi Motoyama (United Kingdom) Richard Lyons; GT300: (Japan) Tetsuya Yamano (Japan) Hiroyuki Yagi
- Last Makes' champion: GT500: Nissan; GT300: Honda
- Last Teams' champion: GT500: Nismo Xanavi/Motul Pitwork; GT300: M-TEC
- Official website: Super GT.net

All Japan Grand Touring Car Championship (JGTC) is a grand touring car racing series that began in 1993. Originally titled as the Zen Nihon GT Senshuken (全日本GT選手権), the series was renamed to Super GT in 2005. It was the top level of sports car racing in Japan.

The series was sanctioned by the Japan Automobile Federation (JAF) and ran by the GT Association (GTA). Autobacs has served as the title sponsor of the series since 1998.

== History ==
The JGTC (Japanese Grand Touring Championship) was established in 1993 by the Japan Automobile Federation (JAF) via its subsidiary company the GTA (GT Association), replacing the defunct All Japan Sports Prototype Championship for Group C cars and the Japanese Touring Car Championship for Group A touring cars, which instead would adopt the supertouring formula. Seeking to prevent the spiraling budgets and one-team/make domination of both series, JGTC imposed strict limits on horsepower, and heavy weight penalties on race winners in an openly stated objective to keep on-track action close with an emphasis on keeping fans happy.

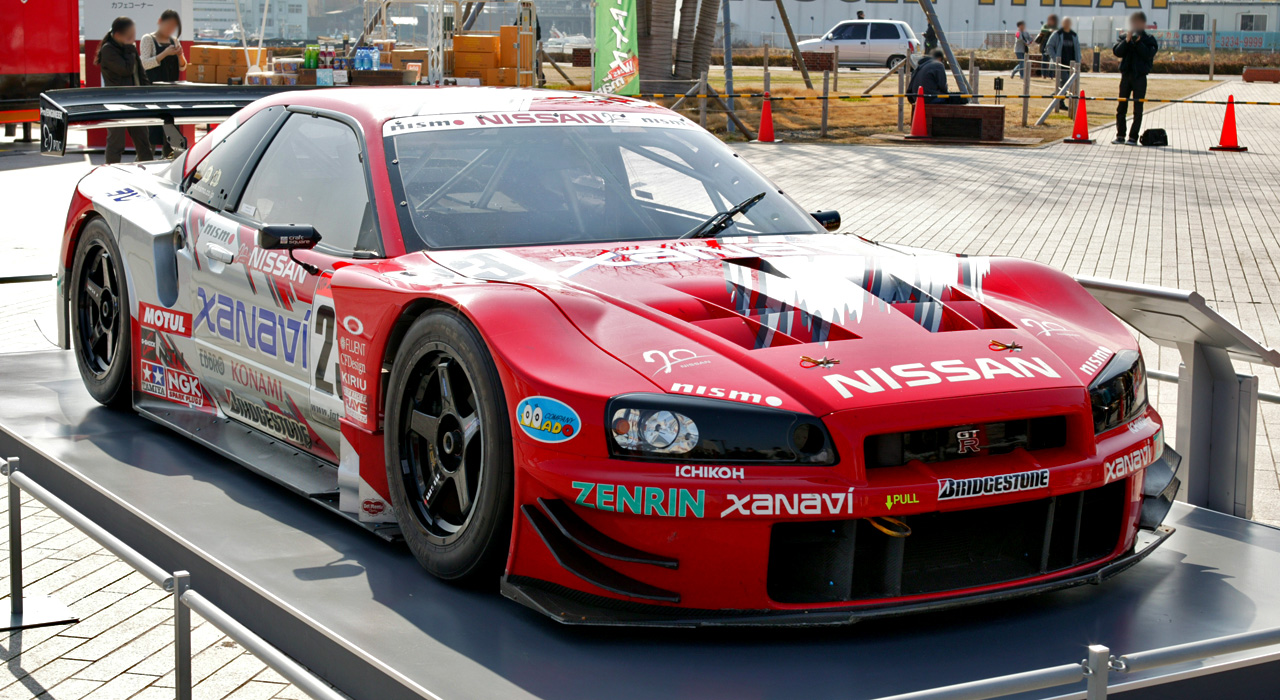
2003 Xanavi nismo GT-R (R34).

In its first season, the JGTC grid mostly consisted of Japan Super Sport Sedan cars, with the only genuine JGTC cars being a Nismo-entered Nissan Skyline GT-R and Nissan Silvia S13, of which the GT-R was a modified AWD Group A car. An exception was the first race of the season, which was also an exhibition race of the IMSA GT Championship, and therefore saw a contingent of GTS and GTU cars from the American series join the field. The 1000 km Suzuka also saw a greater variety of competitors, with Group C prototypes, Group N touring cars, and GT cars from Europe and IMSA all joining the field.

For the following season, the series would undergo a rules overhaul, creating a class for the FIA's GT1 category, and another for the GT2 category. The JSS series would altogether dissolve into the latter category. What made the series more significant was that compared to other racing series, JGTC teams at the time had the freedom to enter whichever cars they preferred, even if it was the JSS cars from the inaugural season or spaceframe racers from the IMSA GTS class. However, the Group C prototypes, whilst easily showing dominant form, were banned from the series from the 1995 season onwards.

By the end of the 1995 season, as the cost of obtaining and running a GT1 car had dramatically increased, the JGTC would go through another rules overhaul in order to lower costs and avoid the fate of the JSPC series it had replaced. The newly formed GT500 and GT300 regulations were adopted, which capped cars with air restrictors depending on their amount of weight and horsepower. While the regulations would continuously evolve, the GT500 and GT300 classes continue to form the top level of Japanese sports car racing today.

== The cars ==
The cars are divided into two groups: GT300 and GT500. The names of the categories derive from their traditional maximum horsepower limit - in the early years of the series, GT500 cars would have no more than 500 horsepower while GT300 cars would max out at around 300 hp and have far less downforce than their GT500 counterparts. While the current generation of engines in GT500 and GT300 cars produced a horsepower output in excess of the traditional limit, the limit stayed in place throughout the entirety of the JGTC era.

In both groups, the car number is assigned to the team, in which each team is allowed to choose whichever number they want as long as the number isn't already used by any other team. The number assigned to each team is permanent, and may only change hands when the team exits the series. In addition, only defending team champions in GT500 are allowed to use number 1, although it isn't mandatory for defending champions to use that number.

For easy identification, GT500 cars run white headlight covers, windshield decals, and number panels, while GT300 cars run yellow versions of those items.

=== GT500 ===
Make	1996	1997	1998	1999	2000	2001	2002	2003	2004
Nissan	Skyline GT-R								350Z
Nissan	300ZX								
Toyota	Supra								
Honda	NSX								
McLaren	F1 GTR			F1 GTR					
Porsche	911 GT2								
Lamborghini	Diablo								
Lamborghini									Murciélago
Ferrari	F40								550 GTS
BMW	M3								
Dodge		Viper							
RGS					GT1				
Mercedes-Benz							CLK		
Vemac								350R	408R

=== GT300 ===
Make	Car	Category	Years competed	Image	Note
ASL	ASL ARTA Garaiya	JAF-GT	2003–2004		
BMW	BMW 318i Coupe	JAF-GT	1996–1997		
BMW	BMW M3	JAF-GT	1996 (E30 generation); 1996–1999 (E36 generation); 2002–2003 (E46 generation)		
Chevrolet	Chevrolet Corvette C4	JAF-GT	2002		
Dodge	Dodge Viper	FIA GT2	2000–2002 (first generation); 2003 (second generation)		Initially competed as a detuned GT500 car
Ferrari	Ferrari F355	JAF-GT	1997–2000		
Ferrari	Ferrari 360	JAF-GT	2001–2004		
Honda	Honda NSX	JAF-GT	1998, 2001–2004		From 2001 to 2002, Verno Tokai Dream28 raced with a detuned 1999-spec Honda NSX GT500 car M-Tec raced a detuned 2003-spec Honda NSX GT500 car in 2004
Mazda	Mazda RX-7	JAF-GT	1996–1997 (FC3S generation); 1996–2004 (FD3S generation)		
Mazda	Mazda Roadster	JAF-GT	1997–1998		
Mitsubishi	Mitsubishi Mirage C53A	JAF-GT	1996		Entered by a privateer
Mitsubishi	Mitsubishi FTO	JAF-GT	1998–1999		Front-wheel drive
Mosler	Mosler MT900	JAF-GT	2001–2004		
Nissan	Nissan Silvia	JAF-GT	1996–1997 (S13 generation); 1996–1999 (S14 generation); 1999–2004 (S15 generation)		
Nissan	Nissan Skyline	JAF-GT	1996–1998 (R31 generation); 1996–1999 (R32 generation)		
Nissan	Nissan Fairlady Z (Z33)	JAF-GT	2003–2004		
Porsche	Porsche 911 GT2	FIA GT2; JAF-GT	1996–2001		
Porsche	Porsche 911 GT3	FIA GT3; JAF-GT	1999–2004		Introduced by Team Taisan on Rd. 5 of the 1999 season
Porsche	Porsche Boxster	JAF-GT	2000		
Porsche	Porsche 968	JAF-GT	2004		Built by Arktech Motorsports
Renault	Renault Sport Spider	JAF-GT	1997		Entered by a privateer
RGS	RGS Mirage GT-1	FIA GT1	2003		Lamborghini Countach kit car powered by a Chevrolet LS1 engine; the same car that ran in GT500 in 2000
Toyota	Toyota MR2	JAF-GT	1996–1999		
Toyota	Toyota Cavalier	JAF-GT	1997–1998		Front-wheel drive
Toyota	Toyota Celica	JAF-GT	1998–2000 (first generation); 2003–2004 (second generation)		First generation car is front-wheel drive Second generation car was introduced by Racing Project Bandoh on Rd. 3 of the 2003 season
Toyota	Toyota AE86	JAF-GT	1999–2001		
Toyota	Toyota Corolla (AE101)	JAF-GT	2000		
Toyota	Toyota MR-S	JAF-GT	2000–2004		
Subaru	Subaru Impreza WRX STi	JAF-GT	1997–2001 (first generation); 2002–2004 (second generation)		Second generation car is a four-door sedan
Vemac	Vemac RD320R	JAF-GT	2002–2004		

== Controversies ==
=== 1998 JGTC Fuji incident ===
Japanese driver Tetsuya Ota is notable for surviving a fiery multi-car pileup he was involved in during a JGTC race at Fuji Speedway on May 3, 1998. The accident was initially caused by an oversaturated track. Ota then aquaplaned and left the track which put him directly into an already crashed Porsche. At the time of the accident, the Ferrari Ota was driving had a full cell of fuel which was ignited by the impact. Ota was severely injured due to third-degree burns on a good percentage of his body which may have been prevented if JGTC, at the time, had sufficient emergency response. Ota filed a lawsuit against the racing club plus organizers for negligence and won the sum of ¥90 million (US$800,000).

=== Death of Shingo Tachi ===
Although there are presently no fatalities during a JGTC or Super GT race meeting, Shingo Tachi, the 1998 GT300 champion, was killed during a testing accident in TI Circuit Aida on March 11, 1999. Tachi's GT500 Toyota Supra, belonging to Team LeMans, suffered a technical failure and was unable to slow down for the first corner; Tachi crashed into the tyre wall at unabated speed, suffering massive chest injuries from the steering wheel and was pronounced dead an hour later.

== Champions ==
Masahiko Kageyama and Morio Nitta are tied for the record of most drivers championship won in GT1/GT300 class with three. Masahiko Kageyama was the first driver to win multiple championship as well as the sport's first two-time and three-time champion, all of them won consecutively.

Season	Category	Drivers' Championship		Teams' Championship	
Season	Category	Driver(s)	Car	Team	Car
1993	GT	(Japan) Masahiko Kageyama	Nissan Skyline GT-R R32	not awarded	
1994	GT1	(Japan) Masahiko Kageyama	Nissan Skyline GT-R R32	Calsonic Hoshino Racing	Nissan Skyline GT-R R32
1994	GT2	(Japan) Sakae Obata	Porsche 964 Carrera RS	Kegani Racing	Porsche 964 Carrera RS
1995	GT1	(Japan) Masahiko Kageyama	Nissan Skyline GT-R R33	Team Taisan	Porsche 911 GT2
1995	GT2	(Japan) Kaoru Hoshino (Japan) Yoshimi Ishibashi	Nissan Skyline GTS-R	Team Gaikokuya	Nissan Skyline GTS-R
1996	GT500	(Australia) David Brabham (Denmark) John Nielsen	McLaren F1 GTR-BMW	Team Lark	McLaren F1 GTR-BMW
1996	GT300	(Japan) Keiichi Suzuki (Japan) Morio Nitta	Porsche Carrera RSR	Team Taisan Jr.	Porsche 964 Carrera RSR
1997	GT500	(Spain) Pedro de la Rosa (Germany) Michael Krumm	Toyota Supra	Toyota Castrol Team TOM'S	Toyota Supra
1997	GT300	(Japan) Hideo Fukuyama (Japan) Manabu Orido	Nissan Silvia S14	RS-R Racing Team with Bandoh	Nissan Silvia S14
1998	GT500	(France) Érik Comas (Japan) Masami Kageyama	Nissan Skyline GT-R R33	Pennzoil NISMO	Nissan Skyline GT-R R33
1998	GT300	(Japan) Keiichi Suzuki (Japan) Shingo Tachi	Toyota MR2	Team Taisan Jr. with Tsuchiya	Toyota MR2
1999	GT500	(France) Érik Comas	Nissan Skyline GT-R R34	Toyota Castrol Team TOM'S	Toyota Supra
1999	GT300	(Japan) Morio Nitta	Toyota MR2	Momocorse Racing with Tsuchiya	Toyota MR2
2000	GT500	(Japan) Ryo Michigami	Honda NSX	Mugen × Dome Project	Honda NSX
2000	GT300	(Japan) Hideo Fukuyama	Porsche 996 GT3R	Team Taisan Advan	Porsche 996 GT3R
2001	GT500	(Japan) Hironori Takeuchi (Japan) Yuji Tachikawa	Toyota Supra	Nismo Hiroto/Xanavi	Nissan Skyline GT-R R34
2001	GT300	(Japan) Nobuyuki Oyagi (Japan) Takayuki Aoki	Nissan Silvia S15	Team Taisan Advan	Porsche 911 GT3R
2002	GT500	(Japan) Juichi Wakisaka (Japan) Akira Iida	Toyota Supra	Mugen × Dome Project	Honda NSX
2002	GT300	(Japan) Morio Nitta (Japan) Shinichi Takagi	Toyota MR-S	Team Taisan Advan	Porsche 911 GT3R
2003	GT500	(Japan) Satoshi Motoyama (Germany) Michael Krumm	Nissan Skyline GT-R R34	Xanavi Nismo	Nissan Skyline GT-R R34
2003	GT300	(Japan) Mitsuhiro Kinoshita (Japan) Masataka Yanagida	Nissan Fairlady Z Z33	Team Taisan Advan	Chrysler Viper GTS-R; Porsche 911 GT3R
2004	GT500	(Japan) Satoshi Motoyama (United Kingdom) Richard Lyons	Nissan Fairlady Z Z33	Nismo Xanavi/Motul Pitwork	Nissan Fairlady Z Z33
2004	GT300	(Japan) Tetsuya Yamano (Japan) Hiroyuki Yagi	Honda NSX	M-TEC	Honda NSX
