= RGS Mirage GT1 =

British race car

- Category: GT1, GT500, and GT300
- Constructor: RGS Motorsport
- Designer: Gary Ward
- Production: 1997

Technical specifications
- Chassis: Steel tube frame
- Suspension: Double wishbone push-rod activated coil springs over anti-shock absorbers, anti-roll bar
- Engine: Chevrolet LS1 5,665 cc (345.7 cu in) V8 naturally aspirated, rear mid-mounted
- Tyres: Dunlop, Advan, and Yokohama

Competition history
- Notable entrants: (United Kingdom) RGS Motorsport; Team Sri Lanka; (Japan) Team LeyJun
- Notable drivers: (United Kingdom) Gary Ward; (Sri Lanka) Dilantha Malagamuwa; (Japan) Osamu Nakajima
- Debut: Silverstone 1997
Entries	Races	Wins	Podiums
23	13	0	0

The RGS Mirage GT1 is a grand tourer-style race car designed and built by RGS Motorsport. Built to GT1 regulations, it competed in the British GT Championship from 1997 to 1998 before contesting select rounds of the All Japan Grand Touring Car Championship in 2000 and 2003. The Mirage GT1 is significant for being constructed from kit car panels to look indistinguishable from the Lamborghini Countach, making it unique amongst top category GT race cars.

== History ==
Built by Gary Ward and equipped with a 5.7L Chevrolet LS1 V8 engine, the Mirage GT1 made its public debut at pre-season testing for the 1997 British GT Championship at Silverstone. Despite the homologation requirements of GT1 mandating the production of at least one road legal chassis, the single Mirage race chassis was granted entry into the championship by the British Racing Drivers' Club. After entering seven of nine rounds that season, the Mirage recorded six DNF results and one DNS result, failing to complete a single race distance. Results improved dramatically during the 1998 British GT Championship, with the car recording its first classified race finish at the opening round at Silverstone. Despite recording multiple failures to start throughout the season, the Mirage achieved a best finish of eight overall at the final round of the season at Silverstone.

After the 1998 season, Ward sold the Mirage to Sri Lankan driver Dilantha Malagamuwa, who imported the car into Japan. The car eventually resurfaced on the entry list for the 2000 All Japan Grand Touring Car Championship as the basis of a new team named Team Sri Lanka. Entered four times into the top class of the championship in GT500, the Mirage failed to start on two occasions and failed to qualify in its other two starts.

Three years later, the unsuccessful Mirage surprisingly appeared again on the entry list for the 2003 All Japan Grand Touring Car Championship. Now entered into the lower GT300 class, the Mirage was now fielded by Team LeyJun. In its first GT300 appearance at the opening round at Aida, the Mirage failed to finish and recorded a fastest lap 3.7 seconds slower than the next-slowest car. In six total starts across 2003, the Mirage failed to finish three times, failed to qualify twice, and did not start once. Cumulatively, across its total career of 23 entries, the Mirage achieved four classified finishes, nine DNFs, six DNSs, and four DNQs.
