= 1993 All Japan Grand Touring Car Championship =

Seasons
- ← 1992 (JSPC) 1994 →

The 1993 All Japan Grand Touring Car Championship was the inaugural season of the Japan Automobile Federation All Japan Grand Touring Car Championship. It was also the eleventh season of a JAF-sanctioned sports car racing championship dating back to the All Japan Sports Prototype Championship (JSPC), which had folded after the 1992 season.

Originally, the series was part of a nine-round championship called the Inter-Circuit League (ICL), which was formed as a last-ditch effort to save the JSPC. Five of the proposed ICL rounds were cancelled due to a lack of entries, and only one race, the Suzuka 1000km, would feature both Group C prototypes and GT cars (as well as cars from the N1 Endurance Series).

The remaining JGTC rounds were staged as joint events with the IMSA GT Championship or the Japan Super Sports Sedan Championship (JSS). Nismo was the only team that built and entered any cars to the new JAF N-GT regulations. Because the format and structure of the races were so different from what would come in future seasons, the 1993 season is not officially recognized by the GT Association (GTA), which was incorporated in October 1993 to manage the All Japan GT Championship (later to become Super GT).

Masahiko Kageyama, the only full-time driver in the GT1 category, was declared the champion, driving a Nissan Skyline GT-R. He would also win the final All-Japan Touring Car Championship to be run to Group A regulations in the same year.

== Drivers and teams ==
=== GT1 ===
Team	Make	Car	Engine	No.	Drivers	Tyre	Rounds
NISMO (Note: Competed in GT-N3 class in round 3)	Nissan	Nissan Skyline GT-R	Nissan RB26DETT 2.6 L Twin Turbo I6	2	(Japan) Masahiko Kageyama	B	1–2, 4
Joe Llauget	Oldsmobile	Oldsmobile Cutlass IMSA GTO	Oldsmobile LT1 6.0 L V8	12	(United States) Joe Llauget	G	1
Lindley Racing (Note: Competed in GTS class in round 3)	Ford	Ford Mustang IMSA GTO	Ford Cleveland 6.0 L V8	48	(United States) Les Lindley	G	1
Tommy Riggins	Oldsmobile	Oldsmobile Cutlass IMSA GTO	Oldsmobile LT1 6.0 L V8	53	(United States) Tommy Riggins	G	1

=== GT2 ===
Team	Make	Car	Engine	No.	Drivers	Tyre	Rounds
NISMO	Nissan	Nissan Silvia	Nissan FJ20DET 2.0 L Turbo I4	3	(Japan) Takayuki Kinoshita	Y	1–2
NISMO	Nissan	Nissan Silvia	Nissan FJ20DET 2.0 L Turbo I4	3	(Japan) Hideo Fukuyama	Y	4
Auberlen Racing Concepts (Note: Entered into round 3 in GTU class with Auberlen and John Morton but did not arrive)	Mazda	Mazda RX-7	Mazda RE13B 1.3 L 2-rotor	19	(United States) Bill Auberlen	Y	1
Jack Lewis Enterprises	Porsche	Porsche 964 RS	Porsche M64/03 3.8 L F6	73	(United States) Jack Lewis	Y	1
Leitzinger Racing	Nissan	Nissan Silvia	Nissan VQ30DE 3.0 L V6	95	(United States) Bob Leitzinger	T	1
Leitzinger Racing	Nissan	Nissan Silvia	Nissan VQ30DE 3.0 L V6	97	(United States) Frank Honsowetz	T	1

=== JSS ===
Team	Make	Car	Engine	No.	Drivers	Tyre	Rounds
RS Nakaharu	Nissan	Nissan Silvia	Nissan FJ20DET 2.0 L Turbo I6	5	(Japan) Hiroyasu Aoyagi	B	1–2, 4
RS Nakaharu	Nissan	Nissan Silvia	Nissan FJ20DET 2.0 L Turbo I6	24	(Japan) Seiichi Sodeyama	B	1–2, 4
RS Nakaharu	Nissan	Nissan Silvia	Nissan FJ20DET 2.0 L Turbo I6	25	(Japan) Minoru Saotome	B	2
RE Amemiya Racing	Mazda	Mazda RX-7	Mazda RE13B 1.3 L 2-rotor	6	(Japan) Katsuo Kobayashi	D	1
RE Amemiya Racing	Mazda	Mazda RX-7	Mazda RE13B 1.3 L 2-rotor	10	(Japan) Tadashi Mizuno	D	1–2, 4
ERC	Mazda	Mazda RX-7	Mazda RE13B 1.3 L 2-rotor	9	(Japan) Tetsuya Kawasaki	D	1
ERC	Mazda	Mazda RX-7	Mazda RE13B 1.3 L 2-rotor	11	(Japan) Takemasa Okazaki	D	1–2
ERC	Mazda	Mazda RX-7	Mazda RE13B 1.3 L 2-rotor	12	(Japan) Tetsuya Kawasaki	D	4
Hiromoto Ishimori	Nissan	Nissan Skyline GTS-R	Nissan RB20DET 2.0 L Turbo I6	13	(Japan) Hiromoto Ishimori	B	1–2, 4
Katsumi Mochizuki	Mazda	Mazda RX-7	Mazda RE13B 1.3 L 2-rotor	17	(Japan) Katsumi Mochizuki	D	1–2
Kenji Tohira	Nissan	Nissan Skyline GTS-R	Nissan RB20DET 2.0 L Turbo I6	22	(Japan) Kenji Tohira	B	1–2
Atsushi Hayakawa	Mazda	Mazda RX-7	Mazda RE13B 1.3 L 2-rotor	33	(Japan) Atsushi Hayakawa	D	1–2
Tetsuo Kozai	Mazda	Mazda RX-7	Mazda RE13B 1.3 L 2-rotor	37	(Japan) Tetsuo Kozai	D	1–2, 4
Shunichi Mori	Mazda	Mazda RX-7	Mazda RE13B 1.3 L 2-rotor	39	(Japan) Shunichi Mori	D	1–2, 4
Katsutoshi Ito	Mazda	Mazda RX-7	Mazda RE13B 1.3 L 2-rotor	40	(Japan) Katsutoshi Ito	D	1, 4
Toshiro Fukazawa	Mazda	Mazda RX-7	Mazda RE13B 1.3 L 2-rotor	55	(Japan) Toshiro Fukazawa	D	1–2, 4
Yoshimi Ishibashi	Nissan	Nissan Skyline GTS-R	Nissan RB20DET 2.0 L Turbo I6	70	(Japan) Yoshimi Ishibashi	Y	1–2, 4

=== C1 ===
Team	Make	Car	Engine	No.	Drivers	Tyre	Rounds
Le Mans Company	Nissan	Nissan R92CP	Nissan VRH35Z 3.5 L Twin Turbo V8	25	(Japan) Takao Wada	B	3
Le Mans Company	Nissan	Nissan R92CP	Nissan VRH35Z 3.5 L Twin Turbo V8	25	(Japan) Toshio Suzuki	B	3
Nova Engineering	Nissan	Nissan R90CK	Nissan VRH35Z 3.5 L Twin Turbo V8	27	(Italy) Mauro Martini	B	3
Nova Engineering	Nissan	Nissan R90CK	Nissan VRH35Z 3.5 L Twin Turbo V8	27	(Germany) Heinz-Harald Frentzen	B	3

=== GT-N3 ===
Team	Make	Car	Engine	No.	Drivers	Tyre	Rounds
NISMO (Note: Competed in GT1 class in all other rounds)	Nissan	Nissan Skyline GT-R	Nissan RB26DETT 2.6 L Twin Turbo I6	2	(Japan) Masahiko Kageyama	B	3
NISMO	Nissan	Nissan Skyline GT-R	Nissan RB26DETT 2.6 L Twin Turbo I6	2	(United States) Jeff Krosnoff	B	3

=== GTS ===
Team	Make	Car	Engine	No.	Drivers	Tyre	Rounds
Competition Motorsport South	Chevrolet	Chevrolet Camaro	Chevrolet LT1 6.0 L V8	11	(United States) Kenny Bupp Jr.	G	3
Competition Motorsport South	Chevrolet	Chevrolet Camaro	Chevrolet LT1 6.0 L V8	11	(Canada) Robert Peters	G	3
Competition Motorsport South	Chevrolet	Chevrolet Camaro	Chevrolet LT1 6.0 L V8	11	(United States) Luis Sereix	G	3
Lindley Racing (Note: Competed in GT1 class in round 1)	Ford	Ford Mustang IMSA GTO	Ford Cleveland 6.0 L V8	48	(United States) Les Lindley	G	3
Lindley Racing	Ford	Ford Mustang IMSA GTO	Ford Cleveland 6.0 L V8	48	(United States) Bob Sobey	G	3

=== GTU ===
Team	Make	Car	Engine	No.	Drivers	Tyre	Rounds
Dibós Racing Team Peru	Mazda	Mazda RX-7	Mazda RE13B 1.3 L 2-rotor	84	(Peru) Eduardo Dibós II	Y	3
Dibós Racing Team Peru	Mazda	Mazda RX-7	Mazda RE13B 1.3 L 2-rotor	84	(Peru) Juan Dibós	Y	3

=== Lights ===
Team	Make	Car	Engine	No.	Drivers	Tyre	Rounds
Comptech Acura Spice Racing	Spice	Spice SE91P	Acura C30A 3.0 L V6	49	(United States) Parker Johnstone	G	3
Comptech Acura Spice Racing	Spice	Spice SE91P	Acura C30A 3.0 L V6	49	(United States) Dan Marvin	G	3

=== LM GT4 ===
Team	Make	Car	Engine	No.	Drivers	Tyre	Rounds
Roock Racing	Porsche	Porsche 964 RSR	Porsche M64/03 3.8 L F6	37	(Germany) Dieter Köll	P	3
Roock Racing	Porsche	Porsche 964 RSR	Porsche M64/03 3.8 L F6	37	(France) Philippe Albera	P	3
Roock Racing	Porsche	Porsche 964 RSR	Porsche M64/03 3.8 L F6	37	(Japan) Akihiko Nakaya	P	3
Chamberlain Engineering	Lotus	Lotus Esprit Sport 200	Lotus 912 2.2 L I4	44	(Republic of Ireland) Gordon Kellett	P	3
Chamberlain Engineering	Lotus	Lotus Esprit Sport 200	Lotus 912 2.2 L I4	44	(Japan) Hideshi Matsuda	P	3
Chamberlain Engineering	Lotus	Lotus Esprit Sport 200	Lotus 912 2.2 L I4	44	(Japan) Tomiko Yoshikawa	P	3
Chamberlain Engineering	Lotus	Lotus Esprit Sport 200	Lotus 912 2.2 L I4	45	(Japan) Yojiro Terada	P	3
Chamberlain Engineering	Lotus	Lotus Esprit Sport 200	Lotus 912 2.2 L I4	45	(Japan) Tetsuya Ota	P	3
Chamberlain Engineering	Lotus	Lotus Esprit Sport 200	Lotus 912 2.2 L I4	45	(Netherlands) Tom Langeberg	P	3
Larbre Compétition	Porsche	Porsche 964 RSR	Porsche M64/03 3.8 L F6	47	(France) Dominique Dupuy	Y	3
Larbre Compétition	Porsche	Porsche 964 RSR	Porsche M64/03 3.8 L F6	47	(Spain) Jesús Pareja	Y	3
Larbre Compétition	Porsche	Porsche 964 RSR	Porsche M64/03 3.8 L F6	47	(France) Jack Laconte	Y	3
HEICO Motorsport	Porsche	Porsche 964 RSR	Porsche M64/03 3.8 L F6	65	(Germany) Jürgen Barth	Y	3
HEICO Motorsport	Porsche	Porsche 964 RSR	Porsche M64/03 3.8 L F6	65	(Germany) Dirk Ebeling	Y	3
HEICO Motorsport	Porsche	Porsche 964 RSR	Porsche M64/03 3.8 L F6	65	(Germany) Karl-Heinz Wlazik	Y	3

=== N1-1 ===
Team	Make	Car	Engine	No.	Drivers	Tyre	Rounds
Motor Sport Division	Nissan	Nissan Skyline GT-R	Nissan RB26DETT 2.6 L Twin Turbo I6	1	(Japan) Masami Miyoshi	D	3
Motor Sport Division	Nissan	Nissan Skyline GT-R	Nissan RB26DETT 2.6 L Twin Turbo I6	1	(Japan) Motoji Sekine	D	3
Beldear Corporation	Nissan	Nissan Skyline GT-R	Nissan RB26DETT 2.6 L Twin Turbo I6	7	(Japan) Hideo Fukuyama	T	3
Beldear Corporation	Nissan	Nissan Skyline GT-R	Nissan RB26DETT 2.6 L Twin Turbo I6	7	(Japan) Kumi Sato	T	3
Revolver	Nissan	Nissan Skyline GT-R	Nissan RB26DETT 2.6 L Twin Turbo I6	8	(Japan) Yoshinori Hasegawa	Y	3
Revolver	Nissan	Nissan Skyline GT-R	Nissan RB26DETT 2.6 L Twin Turbo I6	8	(Japan) Motonobu Sakamoto	Y	3
Knight Sport	Mazda	Mazda RX-7	Mazda RE13B 1.3 L 2-rotor	9	(Japan) Fuminori Mizuno	Y	3
Knight Sport	Mazda	Mazda RX-7	Mazda RE13B 1.3 L 2-rotor	9	(Japan) Yasuo Kusakabe	Y	3
Knight Sport	Mazda	Mazda RX-7	Mazda RE13B 1.3 L 2-rotor	9	(Japan) Yasufumi Yamazaki	Y	3
Susuki Racing Mechanics	Nissan	Nissan Skyline GT-R	Nissan RB26DETT 2.6 L Twin Turbo I6	15	(Japan) Katsuhiko Okamoto	Y	3
Susuki Racing Mechanics	Nissan	Nissan Skyline GT-R	Nissan RB26DETT 2.6 L Twin Turbo I6	15	(Japan) Shinya Motoyoshi	Y	3
Team Actor	Nissan	Nissan Skyline GT-R	Nissan RB26DETT 2.6 L Twin Turbo I6	16	(Japan) Junya Oshima	T	3
Team Actor	Nissan	Nissan Skyline GT-R	Nissan RB26DETT 2.6 L Twin Turbo I6	16	(Japan) Akihiko Koto	T	3
Team Actor	Nissan	Nissan Skyline GT-R	Nissan RB26DETT 2.6 L Twin Turbo I6	16	(Japan) Yoichi Fukudome	T	3

=== N1-2 ===
Team	Make	Car	Engine	No.	Drivers	Tyre	Rounds
Nakajima Planning	Honda	Honda Prelude	Honda H22A 2.2 L I4	6	(Japan) Koji Sato	B	3
Nakajima Planning	Honda	Honda Prelude	Honda H22A 2.2 L I4	6	(Japan) Hidetoshi Mitsusada	B	3
Gazas	Honda	Honda Prelude	Honda H22A 2.2 L I4	21	(Japan) Kazuo Shimizu	T	3
Gazas	Honda	Honda Prelude	Honda H22A 2.2 L I4	21	(Japan) Masami Kageyama	T	3
Gazas	Honda	Honda Prelude	Honda H22A 2.2 L I4	21	(Japan) Takahiko Hara	T	3
Formula Spirit	Honda	Honda Prelude	Honda H22A 2.2 L I4	26	(France) Daniel Latour	T	3
Formula Spirit	Honda	Honda Prelude	Honda H22A 2.2 L I4	26	(Japan) Takeshi Tsuchiya	T	3
Formula Spirit	Honda	Honda Prelude	Honda H22A 2.2 L I4	26	(Japan) Tatsuya Tanigawa	T	3

=== N1-3 ===
Team	Make	Car	Engine	No.	Drivers	Tyre	Rounds
Team A-One	Honda	Honda Civic SiR	Honda B16A2 1.6 L I4	6	(Japan) Ryo Michigami	T	3
Team A-One	Honda	Honda Civic SiR	Honda B16A2 1.6 L I4	6	(Japan) Atsushi Okuda	T	3
Team A-One	Honda	Honda Civic SiR	Honda B16A2 1.6 L I4	6	(Japan) Yoshihisa Fujita	T	3

=== RS ===
Team	Make	Car	Engine	No.	Drivers	Tyre	Rounds
Cosmos Racing	Oscar	Oscar SK90	Mazda RE13B 1.3 L 2-rotor	5	(Japan) Masaki Ohashi	D	3
Cosmos Racing	Oscar	Oscar SK90	Mazda RE13B 1.3 L 2-rotor	5	(Japan) Katsunori Yamamoto	D	3
Cosmos Racing	Oscar	Oscar SK90	Mazda RE13B 1.3 L 2-rotor	5	(Japan) Yoshifumi Yamazaki	D	3
Cosmos Racing	Oscar	Oscar SK90	Mazda RE13B 1.3 L 2-rotor	73	(Japan) Yoichiro Suzuki	D	3
Cosmos Racing	Oscar	Oscar SK90	Mazda RE13B 1.3 L 2-rotor	73	(Japan) Akio Tomita	D	3
Cosmos Racing	Oscar	Oscar SK90	Mazda RE13B 1.3 L 2-rotor	73	(Japan) Naoto Chikada	D	3
Trident	Oscar	Oscar SK90	Mazda RE13B 1.3 L 2-rotor	10	(Japan) Koichi Hamada	D	3
Trident	Oscar	Oscar SK90	Mazda RE13B 1.3 L 2-rotor	10	(Japan) Minetaka Mizuno	D	3
Trident	Oscar	Oscar SK90	Mazda RE13B 1.3 L 2-rotor	10	(Japan) Tadayuki Sato	D	3
Car Graphic Racing Team	Oscar	Oscar SK90	Mazda RE13B 1.3 L 2-rotor	17	(Japan) Masayoshi Furuya	D	3
Car Graphic Racing Team	Oscar	Oscar SK90	Mazda RE13B 1.3 L 2-rotor	17	(Japan) Masahiro Tejima	D	3
Car Graphic Racing Team	Oscar	Oscar SK90	Mazda RE13B 1.3 L 2-rotor	17	(Japan) Hisashi Tukahara	D	3
Mascrat Racing Team	Oscar	Oscar SK90	Mazda RE13B 1.3 L 2-rotor	23	(Japan) Tsuguo Yagyu	Y	3
Mascrat Racing Team	Oscar	Oscar SK90	Mazda RE13B 1.3 L 2-rotor	23	(Japan) Mari Nagata	Y	3
Mascrat Racing Team	Oscar	Oscar SK90	Mazda RE13B 1.3 L 2-rotor	23	(Japan) Katsuto Kinugasa	Y	3
Mitsuo Yamamoto	Oscar	Oscar SK90	Mazda RE13B 1.3 L 2-rotor	51	(Japan) Mitsuo Yamamoto	D	3
Mitsuo Yamamoto	Oscar	Oscar SK90	Mazda RE13B 1.3 L 2-rotor	51	(Japan) Genji Hashimoto	D	3
Jikanwari	West	West 89S	Mazda RE13B 1.3 L 2-rotor	52	(Japan) Tomohiro Tomasu	D	3
Jikanwari	West	West 89S	Mazda RE13B 1.3 L 2-rotor	52	(Japan) Michiko Hashimoto	D	3
IZUMODEN	Oscar	Oscar SK90	Mazda RE13B 1.3 L 2-rotor	55	(Japan) Yoshiyuki Ogura	Y	3
IZUMODEN	Oscar	Oscar SK90	Mazda RE13B 1.3 L 2-rotor	55	(Japan) Keiichi Mizutani	Y	3
IZUMODEN	Oscar	Oscar SK90	Mazda RE13B 1.3 L 2-rotor	55	(Japan) Hajime Oshiro	Y	3

== Schedule ==
Round	Race	Circuit	Date
1	(Japan) IMSA GT Fuji	Fuji Speedway	March 28
2	(Japan) Fuji 100 km	Fuji Speedway	May 30
3	(Japan) Suzuka 1000 km	Suzuka Circuit	August 29
4	(Japan) Fuji F3000	Fuji Speedway	October 17

== Race results ==
Round	Circuit	Date	Pole position	Winner
1	(Japan) Fuji Speedway	March 28	#2 NISMO	#2 NISMO
1	(Japan) Fuji Speedway	March 28	(Japan) Masahiko Kageyama	(Japan) Masahiko Kageyama
2	(Japan) Fuji Speedway	May 30	#2 NISMO	#2 NISMO
2	(Japan) Fuji Speedway	May 30	(Japan) Masahiko Kageyama	(Japan) Masahiko Kageyama
3	(Japan) Suzuka Circuit	August 29	#27 Nova Engineering	#25 Le Mans Company
3	(Japan) Suzuka Circuit	August 29	(Italy) Mauro Martini (Germany) Heinz-Harald Frentzen	(Japan) Takao Wada (Japan) Toshio Suzuki
4	(Japan) Fuji Speedway	October 17	#2 NISMO	#2 NISMO
4	(Japan) Fuji Speedway	October 17	(Japan) Masahiko Kageyama	(Japan) Masahiko Kageyama
