= Honda HSC =

Concept vehicle

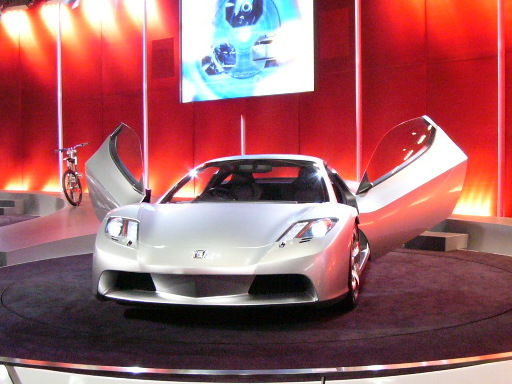

Overview
- Manufacturer: Honda
- Also called: Honda Sports Concept
- Production: 2003

Body and chassis
- Class: Concept car
- Body style: 2-door coupe
- Layout: Rear mid-engine, rear-wheel-drive
- Doors: Swan
- Related: Honda NSX (first generation) Honda HSV-010 GT

Powertrain
- Engine: 3.5 L (210 cu in) i-VTEC V6

The Honda HSC (Honda Sports Concept) was a concept sports car that was initially unveiled at the 2003 Tokyo Motor Show. Most of the automotive media immediately speculated that it was designed to be a replacement for the Honda NSX, although this was never confirmed by Honda. It was also branded as an Acura.

The HSC featured a lightweight, mid-mounted aluminum 3.5 L (210 cu in) i-VTEC V6 engine with a 6-speed transmission controlled by either an F1-style paddle shifter on the steering wheel or a unique dial shifter on the center console. When shifted into reverse, the navigation system's adjustable flat-panel screen in the center console became a display for a rear-mounted camera. Abundant leather and aluminum trim pieces rounded out the interior, an all-aluminum frame with carbon fibre body panels kept it light, and swan doors affirmed its sports car status.

The development of this car into a production sports car appeared to stall for two years. However, the July 2005 announcement by Honda CEO Takeo Fukui indicated the HSC was only a test concept for a pure sports car.

In 2009, a road car version of the Honda HSV-010 GT was seen, with some visual similarities with the HSC. It was also assumed to be a replacement for the NSX, although there is no official confirmation of this. In 2013, Honda unveiled the next generation NSX concept car, which replaced the HSV-010 in the Super GT GT500 class.
