= Honda NSX (first generation) =

Honda NSX (NA1/2)
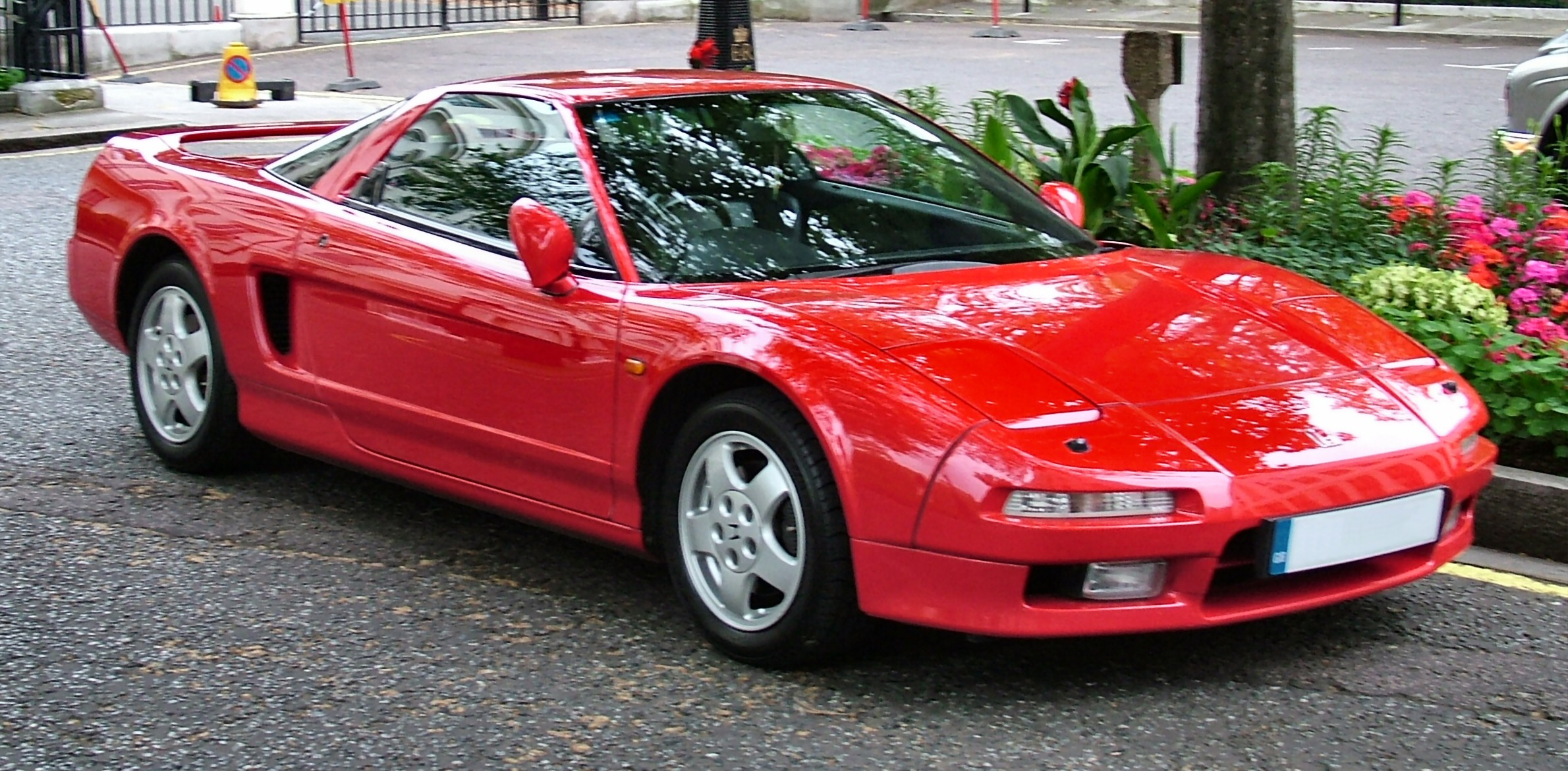

Overview
- Manufacturer: Honda
- Also called: Acura NSX (North America and Hong Kong)
- Production: August 1990 – November 30, 2005
- Model years: 1991–2005
- Assembly: Takanezawa R&D Plant, Tochigi, Japan (1990–2003); Suzuka R&D Plant, Suzuka, Japan (2004–2005)
- Designer: Ken Okuyama (1987); Masahito Nakano (1987); Shigeru Uehara (1988); James Stevens (1988)

Body and chassis
- Class: Sports car (S)
- Body style: 2-door coupé; 2-door targa top
- Layout: Transverse Rear-mid-engine, rear-wheel drive
- Related: Honda HSC; Mitsuoka Orochi

Powertrain
- Engine: 2,977 cc (3.0 L) Honda C30A V6; 3,179 cc (3.2 L) Honda C32B V6
- Power output: 3.0-litre models: 270 hp (201 kW; 274 PS) 210 lb⋅ft (285 N⋅m); automatic models: 252 hp (188 kW; 255 PS) 210 lb⋅ft (285 N⋅m); 3.2-litre models: 290 hp (216 kW; 294 PS) 224 lb⋅ft (304 N⋅m)
- Transmission: 4-speed automatic; 5-speed manual; 6-speed manual

Dimensions
- Wheelbase: 2,530 mm (99.6 in)
- Length: 4,405 mm (173.4 in) (1991–1993); 4,425 mm (174.2 in) (1994–2005)
- Width: 1,810 mm (71.3 in)
- Height: 1,170 mm (46.1 in); 1,160 mm (45.7 in) (1997 onwards)
- Kerb weight: (1991–1992): 1,365 kg (3,010 lb); (1993–1994): 1,370 kg (3,020 lb); (1992–1995 NSX-R): 1,230 kg (2,712 lb); (1995–1996): 1,425 kg (3,142 lb); (1997–2001): 1,435 kg (3,164 lb); (1997–2001 Type S): 1,320 kg (2,910 lb); (1997–2001 Type S-Zero): 1,270 kg (2,799 lb); (2002–2005): 1,430 kg (3,153 lb); (2002–2005 NSX-R): 1,270 kg (2,799 lb)

Chronology
- Successor: Honda NSX (second generation)

The first generation Honda NSX (Note: New Sportscar eXperimental) (marketed in North America and Hong Kong as the Acura NSX) is a two-seater, mid-engine sports car that was manufactured by Honda in Japan from 1990 until 2005.

== Development ==
Around 1984, Honda engineers began experimenting with different engine and chassis layouts to test viability for future products. One of the test mules was a Honda City that had been cut in half, with the engine installed behind the driver's seat and powering the rear wheels. Although the project was not developed any further, many of the engineers were inspired by the exciting laps around the company parking lot in the mid-engined City. This experience, in part, convinced Honda leadership that the company should consider developing a pure sports car. As a result, in 1984, Honda commissioned the Italian car styling house Pininfarina to design the concept car HP-X (Honda Pininfarina eXperimental), which had a DOHC C20A 2.0 L V6 engine in a mid-mounted configuration. After Honda committed to a sports car project, the company management informed the engineers working on the project that the new car would have to be as fast as anything coming from Italy and Germany. The HP-X concept car evolved into a prototype known as NS-X, which stood for "New", "Sportscar" "eXperimental". The prototype and eventual production model—which was marketed as the NSX—were designed by a team led by Honda Chief Designer Masahito Nakano, and Executive Chief Engineer Shigeru Uehara (who were subsequently placed in charge of the S2000 project).

The original performance target for Honda's new sports car was the Ferrari 328 (and later, the 348) as the design neared completion. Honda intended its sports car to meet or exceed the performance of the Ferrari, while offering superior reliability and a lower price. For this reason, the 2.0 L V6 engine utilised in the HP-X was shelved and ultimately replaced with a significantly more powerful 3.0 L VTEC V6 engine. Over the course of development of the NSX, many engines were used, ranging from the 2.7-litre single overhead camshaft V6 engine from the Honda Legend/Honda Coupé to the 3.0-litre single overhead camshaft V6 engine, used subsequently in 15 test mules. Honda eventually settled on a non-VTEC, 3.0-liter double overhead camshaft 24-valve V6 engine selected for the production model. This engine generated a maximum power output of about 250 hp (186 kW; 253 PS) and 282 N⋅m (208 lb⋅ft) of torque, with a redline of 7,300 rpm. However, at the same time, Honda was working on its revolutionary VTEC variable valve timing system, with plans to release it on the company's home-market 4-cylinder Integra. Honda's then-president Tadashi Kume, himself a highly skilled and respected engine designer, questioned the NS-X designers' logic in foregoing the VTEC system for Honda's new flagship sports car, while it was being used on the lower-market Integra. As a result, the engine was redesigned very late in the development process "to achieve the desired levels of performance and durability"; Honda designed a new cylinder block with 6-bolt main caps and larger cylinder heads to contain the complex VTEC mechanism. Innovative connecting rods made from a titanium alloy were used to lower reciprocating weight, while increasing overall rod-strength—something which increased the engine's maximum rpm by 700, resulting in a final redline of 8,000 rpm. A consequence of this last-minute engine change was that the new C30A engine was too large to fit in the NS-X's engine bay, which had been carefully sized for the smaller heads of the non-VTEC DOHC 3.0 liter engine. As a result, the engineers were forced to tilt the entire engine backward approximately 5 degrees- a characteristic that continued all the way to the NSX's final production in 2005.

The exterior design had been specifically researched by Uehara after studying the 360-degree visibility inside an F-16 fighter jet's cockpit. Thematically, the F-16 came into play in the exterior design as well as establishing the conceptual goals of the NSX. In the F-16 and other high performance aircraft such as unlimited hydroplanes along with open-wheel race cars, the cockpit is located far forward and in front of the power plant. This "cab-forward" layout was chosen to optimise visibility while the long tail design enhanced high speed directional stability. The NSX was designed to showcase several automotive technologies, many derived from Honda's F1 motor-sports program.

The NSX was the first production car to feature an all-aluminium semi-monocoque, incorporating a revolutionary extruded aluminium alloy frame and suspension components. The use of aluminium saved nearly 200 kg (441 lb) of weight over the use of steel in the body alone, while the aluminium suspension arms saved an additional 20 kg (44 lb); a suspension compliance pivot helped maintain wheel alignment changes at a near zero value throughout the suspension cycle. Other notable features included an independent, 4-channel anti-lock brake system; an electric power steering system; Honda's proprietary VTEC variable valve timing system and in 1995, the first electronic throttle control fitted in a Honda production car.

With a robust motorsports division, Honda had significant development resources at its disposal and made extensive use of them. Respected Japanese Formula One driver Satoru Nakajima, for example, was involved with Honda in the NSX's early on-track development at Suzuka race circuit, where he performed many endurance distance duties related to chassis tuning. Brazilian Formula One World Champion Ayrton Senna, who won many races in Formula One with Honda powered McLarens before his death in 1994, successfully considered the company to stiffen the NSX's chassis further after initially testing the car at Honda's Suzuka GP circuit in Japan. Many people say that Ayrton Senna was the development driver, but this is incorrect as he only rode in the development vehicle a few times and gave advice. In fact, the development driver was Motoharu Kurosawa, also known as Gan-San, who proposed using the Nürburgring as the development base and installing an all-aluminium body and VTEC engine. While testing it at the Nürburgring Nordschleife, Kurosawa would drive a lap on the circuit and then discuss with the Honda engineers where he felt flex in the chassis. The engineers would then hand-weld aluminium braces in the area they believed would fix the issue and send the driver back out to confirm. This process was repeated over and over, with the data results sent directly to Honda headquarters in Japan, where it was fed into a Cray supercomputer and translated into reinforcements in the production aluminium monocoque. As a result of this process, the NS-X chassis stiffness increased by over 50% with only a small increase in weight. The suspension development program was similarly far-ranging and took place at the Tochigi Proving Grounds, the Suzuka circuit, the 179-turn Nürburgring Nordschleife in Germany, HPCC, and Honda's newest test track in Takasu, Hokkaido. Honda automobile dealer Bobby Rahal (1986 Indianapolis 500 champion) also participated in the development and testing of the suspension.

== Official launch and production ==
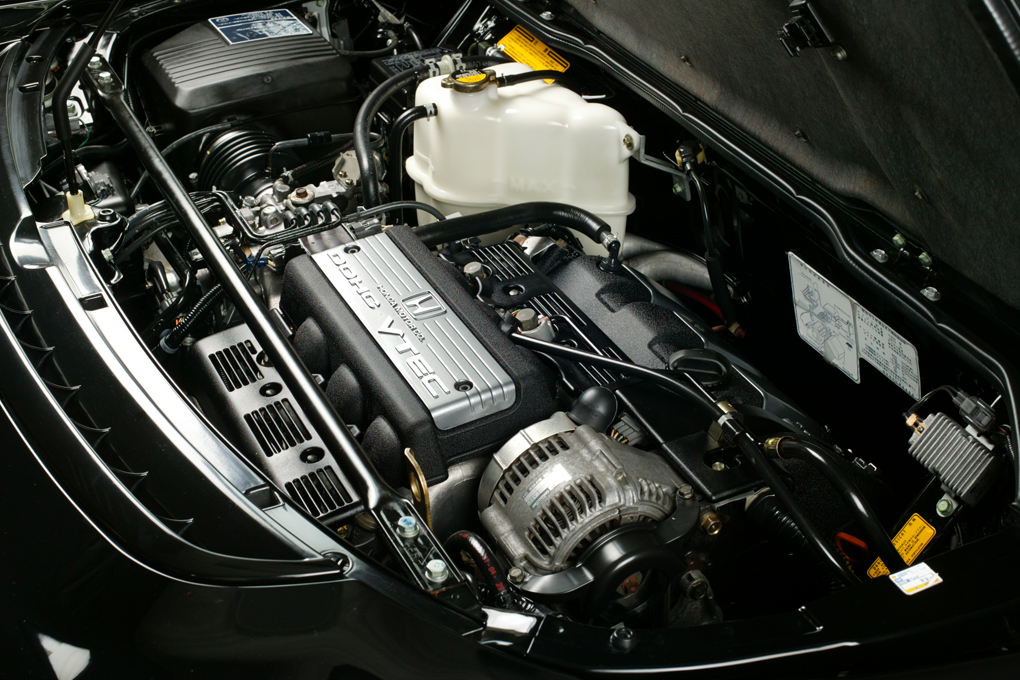
The transversely mounted 3.0-litre Honda C30A V6 engine

The NSX made its first public appearances in 1989, at the Chicago Auto Show in February and at the Tokyo Motor Show in October of that year, receiving positive reviews. Honda revised the car's name from NS-X to NSX before commencement of production and sales. The NSX went on sale in Japan in 1990 at Honda Verno dealership sales channels, supplanting the Prelude as the flagship model. The NSX was sold under Honda's Acura luxury brand starting in November 1990 in North America and Hong Kong.

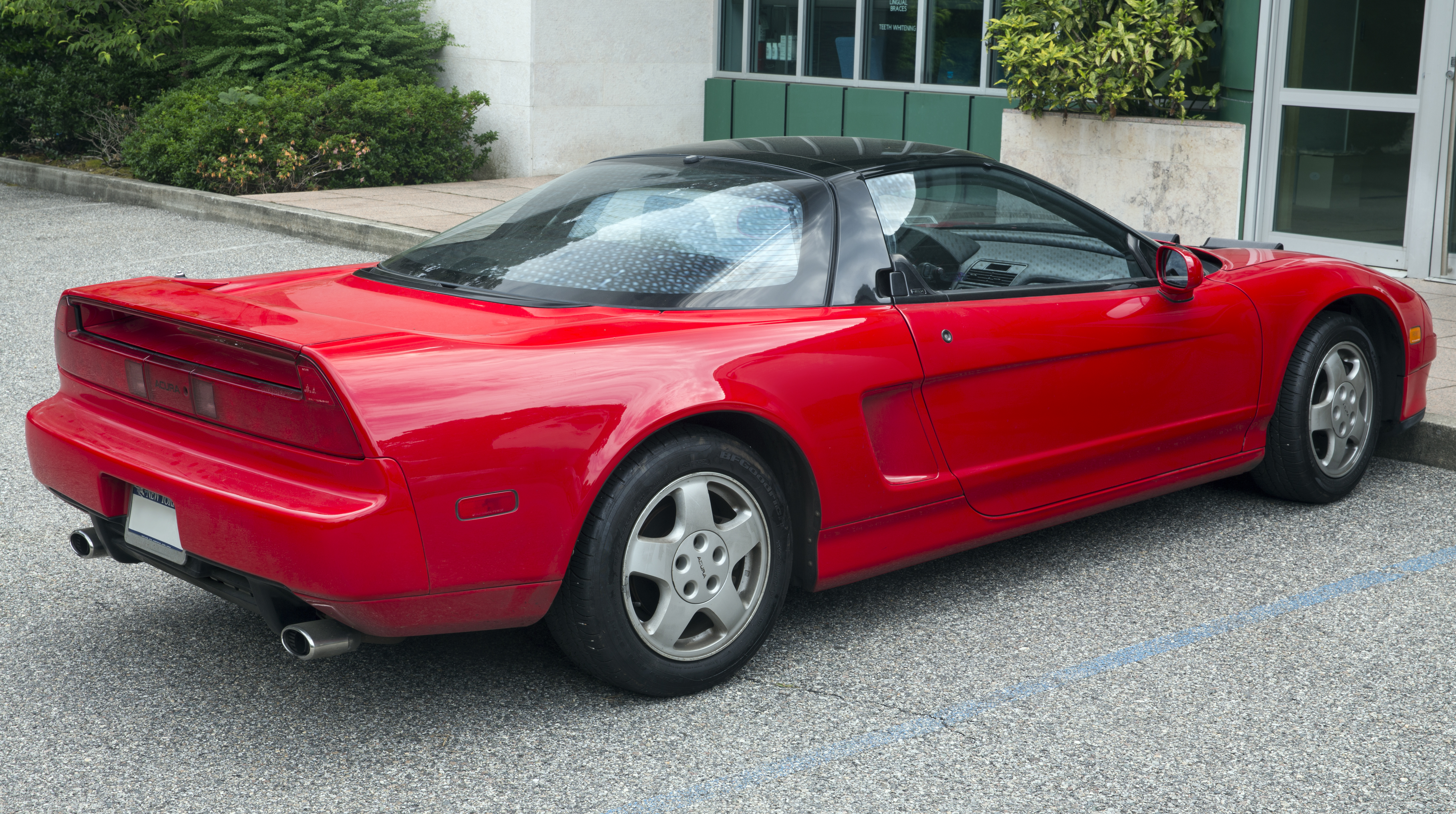
Acura NSX (rear view; 1991)

Upon its official debut, the NSX design concept showcased Honda's technology, measuring only 1,170 mm (46 in) in height. The Japanese car maker's race track innovations and competitive history were further exemplified on the road by the NSX's ultra-rigid and ultra-light all aluminium monocoque chassis along with front and rear double wishbone suspension, with forged control arms connected to forged alloy wheels. The car additionally boasted the world's first production car engine with titanium connecting rods, forged pistons, and ultra high-revving capabilities – the redline was at 8,300 rpm – all traits usually associated with track and race engineered cars. The NSX's exterior had a dedicated 23-step paint process, including an aircraft type chromate coating designed for chemically protecting the aluminium bodywork and a waterborne paint for the base coat to achieve a clearer, more vivid top colour and a smoother surface finish.

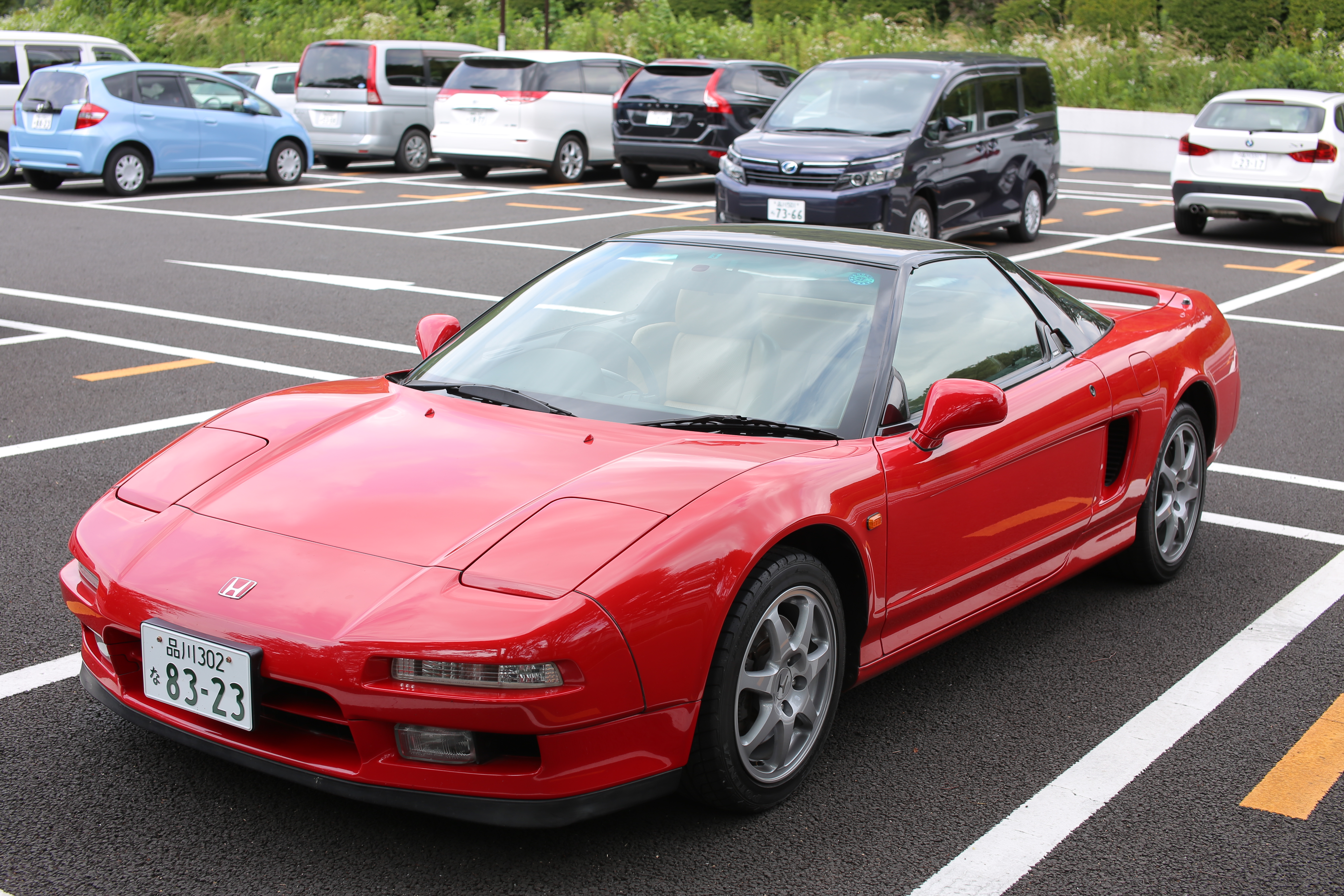
Honda NSX (pre-facelift)

The car's cornering/handling capabilities were the results of Formula One driver Ayrton Senna's consultation with NSX's chief engineers while testing the NSX prototype at Honda's Suzuka Circuit during its final stages of suspension tuning. The NSX was initially assembled at the purpose-built Takanezawa R&D Plant in Tochigi from 1989 to early 2004, when it was moved to Suzuka Plant for the remainder of its production life. The cars were assembled by approximately 200 of Honda's highest-skilled and most experienced personnel, a team of hand-picked staff with a minimum of ten years assembly experience employed from various other Honda facilities to run the NSX operation.

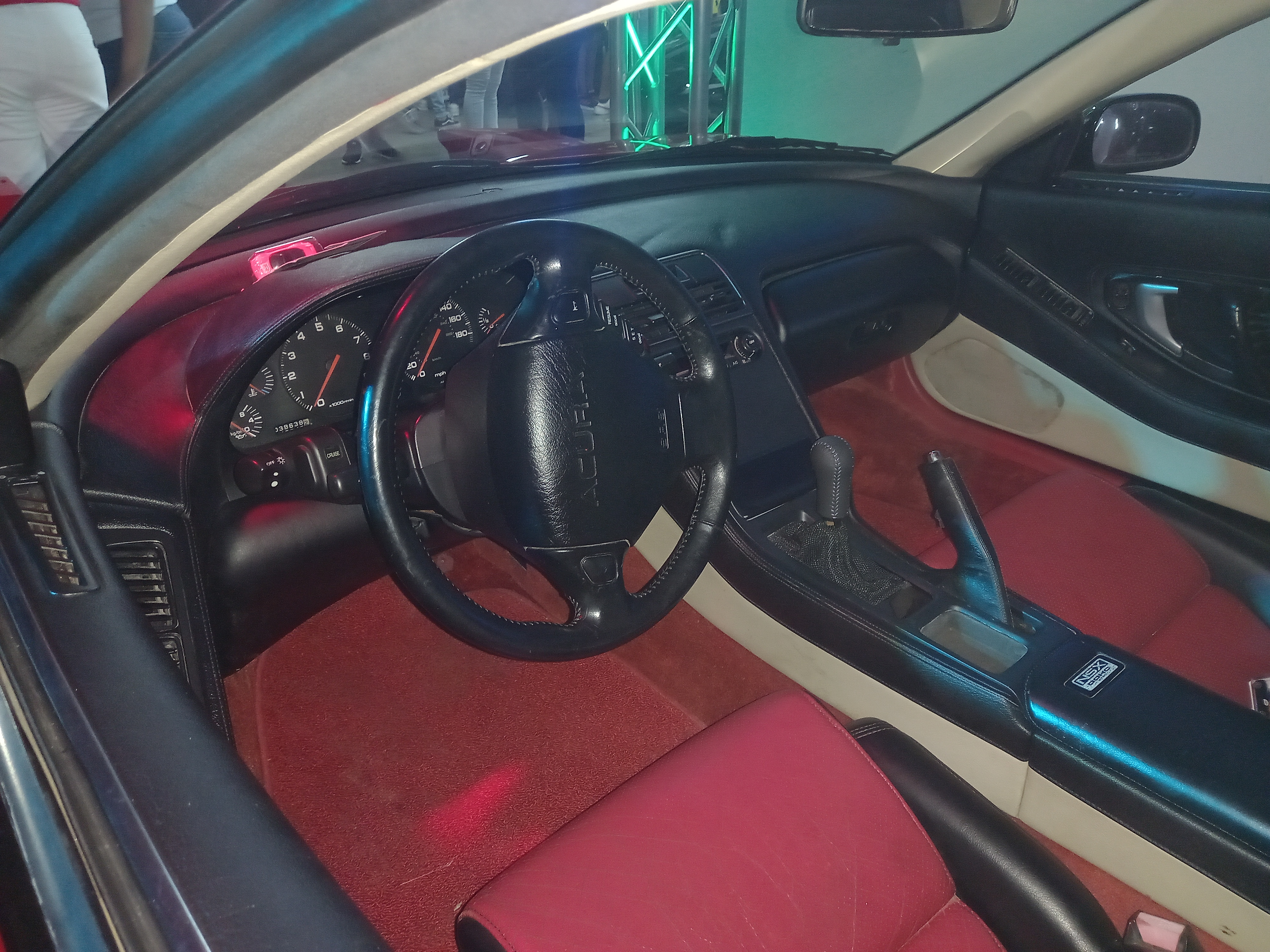
Acura NSX interior

Production of the first generation of the NSX ended on November 30, 2005. Sales in the United States and Canada ended in 2005 and 2000, respectively.

As of the end of June 2005, the NSX achieved total worldwide sales of more than 18,000 units in over 15 years.

=== North American sales figures ===
Year	USA	Canada
1990	1,119	156
1991	1,940	253
1992	1,154	91
1993	652	64
1994	533	31
1995	884	38
1996	460	16
1997	415	13
1998	303	10
1999	238	5
2000	221	6
2001	182	4
2002	233	3
2003	221	2
2004	178	6
2005	206	1
2006	60	2

== Variants ==
=== NSX-R (1992) ===
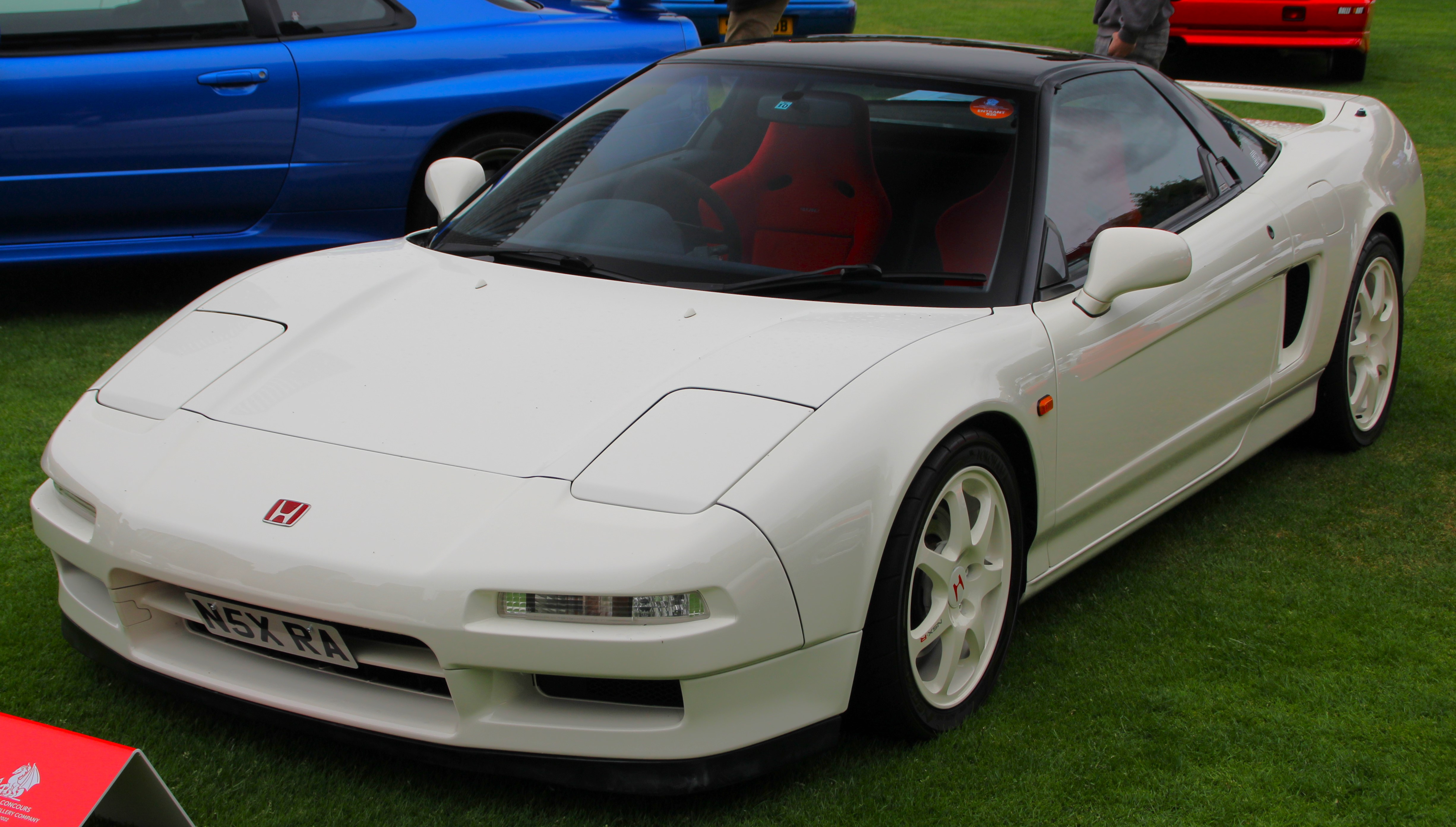
Honda NSX-R

While the NSX always was intended to be a world-class sports car, engineers had made some compromises in order to strike a suitable balance between raw performance and daily driveability. For those NSX customers seeking a no-compromise racing experience, Honda decided in 1992 to produce a version of the NSX specifically modified for superior track performance at the expense of customary creature comforts. Thus, the NSX Type R (or NSX-R) was born. Honda chose to use its moniker of Type R to designate the NSX-R's race-oriented capabilities.

Honda engineers started with a base NSX coupé and embarked on an aggressive program of weight reduction. Sound deadening, the audio system, spare tyre, air conditioning system and traction control along with some of the electrical equipment were removed however these could be available as options. The power leather seats were replaced with lightweight carbon-kevlar racing seats made by Recaro for Honda. However, electric windows and fore/aft electric seat adjusters were retained. The stock forged alloy wheels were replaced with lighter forged aluminium wheels produced by Enkei, which reduced the car's unsprung weight. The standard leather shift knob was replaced with a sculpted titanium piece. Overall, Honda managed to reduce approximately 120 kg (265 lb) (minus options) of weight as compared to the standard NSX, resulting in the NSX-R's final weight of 1,230 kg (2,712 lb).

As found by the automotive press such as Car and Driver in their September 1997 issue's comparison of "Best Handling Car for more than $30K", the NSX, due to its mid-engine layout and rear-end link travel, was susceptible to a sudden oversteer condition during certain cornering maneuvers. While this condition rarely occurred during normal driving conditions, it was much more prevalent on race tracks where speeds were much higher. To address the problem and improve the NSX-R's cornering stability at the limit, Honda added one aluminium bracket under the front battery tray and added one bracket in front of the front radiator to add more chassis rigidity replacing the entire suspension system with a more track oriented unit, featuring a stiffer front sway bar, stiffer suspension bushings, stiffer coil springs and stiffer dampers.

The standard NSX has a somewhat rearward bias in its spring and bar rates, where the rear was relatively quite stiff versus the front. This means that the lateral load transfer distribution, or the amount of load that is transferred across the front axle versus the rear while cornering, is rather rear biased. This can make the car quite lively and easy to rotate at low speed, but during high speed cornering, this effect becomes more pronounced and could be a handful to manage. To reduce the tendency to oversteer, Honda fitted softer rear tyres on the NSX. For the NSX-R, Honda reversed the spring bias, placing stiffer springs on the front suspension along with stiffer front sway bar. This shifted the load transfer stiffness balance farther forward, resulting in more rear grip at the expense of front grip; this had the effect of decreasing the oversteer tendency of the car, making it much more stable while cornering at high speeds. Overall, the NSX-R utilises a much stiffer front sway bar along with stiffer springs than the standard NSX (21.0 mm x 2.6 mm front sway bar: front 3.0 kg/mm, rear 4.0 kg/mm for the NSX versus front 8.0 kg/mm, rear 5.7 kg/mm for the NSX-R).

Honda also increased the final drive ratio to a 4.235:1 in place of the 4.06:1, which resulted in faster gear changes. This change improved acceleration, which was 4.9 seconds to 60 mph, at the expense of top speed, which was 168 mph, and a higher locking limited-slip differential was installed. Also, the NSX-R's 3.0-litre engine had a blueprinted and balanced crankshaft assembly which is exactly the same labour-intensive high precision process done for Honda racing car engines built by highly qualified engine technicians.

Beginning in late November 1992, Honda produced a limited number of 483 NSX-R variants exclusively for the Japanese domestic market (JDM). Factory optional equipment such as air conditioning, Bose stereo system, carbon fibre interior trim on the centre console as well as the doors and larger wheels painted in Championship White (16-inches at the front and 17-inches at the rear) were available for a hefty premium. Production of the NSX-R ended in September 1995.

=== NSX-T (1995) ===
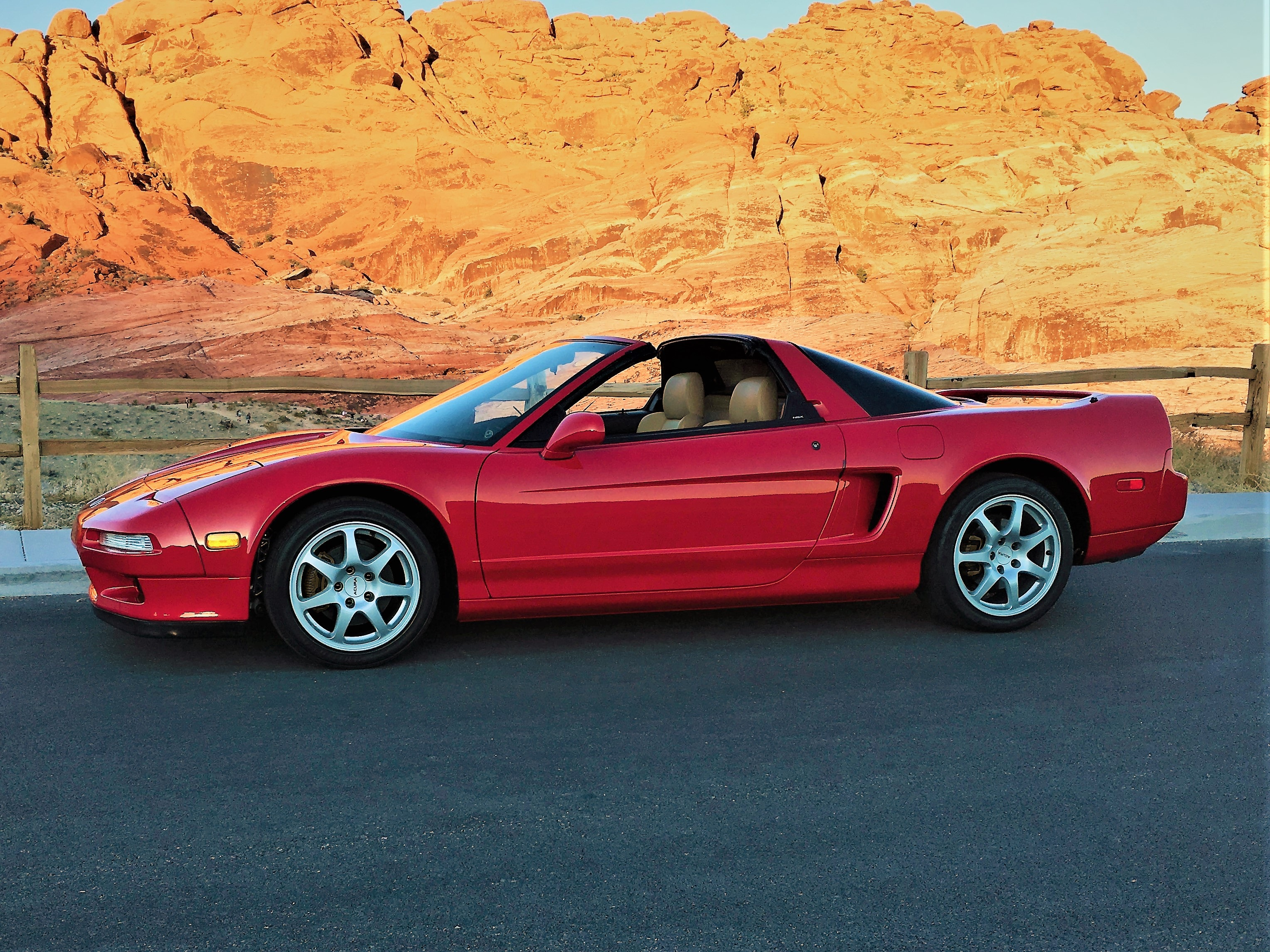
1995 NSX-T

Beginning in 1995, the NSX-T with a removable targa top in black colour was introduced in Japan as a special order option and in North America in March 1995. The NSX-T largely replaced the standard coupé entirely in North America as the only version available post 1994 and all NSXs thereafter were available in targa bodystyle, with two notable exceptions: the Zanardi Special Edition NSX in 1999; and a handful of special order post-1997/pre-2002 3.2-litre base model cars- both of which retained the original hardtop configuration. The European market continued to offer both body styles. The removable roof resulted in decreased chassis rigidity and Honda added about 100 pounds (45 kg) of structural reinforcements to compensate, including significantly thicker frame sidesill rocker panels (the body component which contributes most to the chassis's rigidity), bulkheads, roof pillars and the addition of new front/rear bulkhead and floorpan crossmembers. The targa models, manufactured for the rest of the NSX's production run through 2005, sacrificed weight and some of the original coupé's chassis rigidity in return for an open cockpit driving experience. In addition to this major change, all subsequent NSX-Ts (1995–2001) had smaller-diameter front sway bars, slightly stiffer front springs, softer rear springs and firmer shock-dampers to improve ride comfort and tyre wear while reducing the tendency towards oversteer common in mid-engined vehicles. The small handful of special ordered, base model "hardtop" NSX's from 1997 to 2001, still retained the original black roof. All other roofs post 1995 were now body-coloured instead of black, although in Japan, the two-tone black roof/body colour was still available as an optional feature. A lighter version of the variable-ratio, electric-assisted power steering rack, previously found exclusively in the cars equipped with the automatic transmission, became standard on all models. Starting in 1995, the 5-speed transmission's second gear ratio was lowered by 4.2% to improve driveability and provide better response and automatic transmissions received an optional Formula One-inspired Sport Shift with a unique steering column mounted electronic shifter. Manual transmission cars received an improved Torque Reactive limited-slip differential – when combined with a new Throttle-By-Wire system, increased corner exit speeds by 10%. Other innovations beginning in 1995 included a new and lighter exhaust system and muffler configuration for greater efficiency and lower emissions, an OBD-II onboard diagnostic system, improvements in the Traction Control System (TCS) and newly developed fuel injectors.

=== 1997 performance update (NA2; Manual transmission only) ===
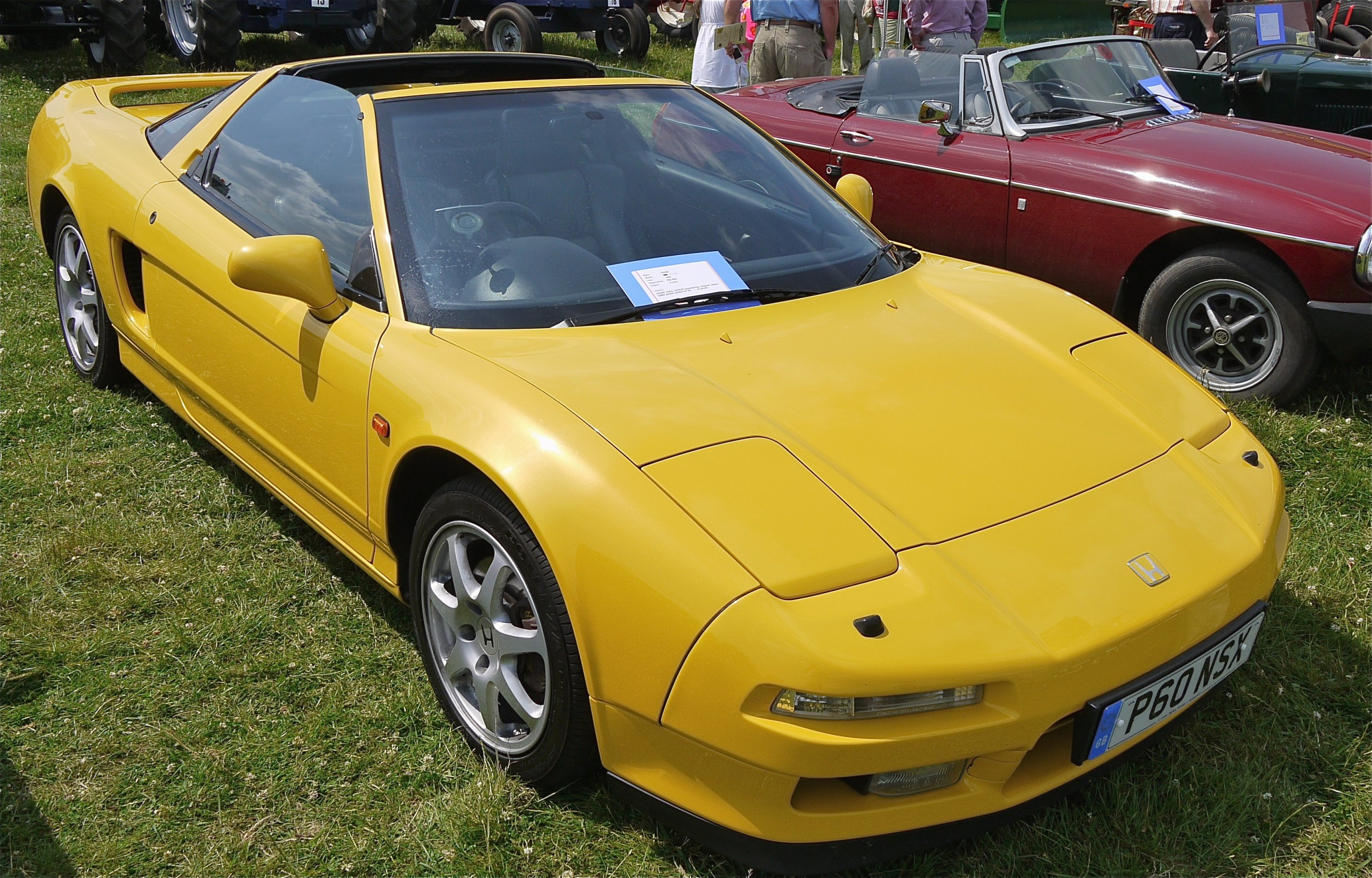
1997 NSX-T

In 1997, Honda introduced the NSX's biggest performance update for all of its worldwide markets. For cars equipped with manual transmissions, engine displacement was increased from 3.0 L to 3.2 L using a thinner fibre-reinforced metal (FRM) cylinder liner. The exhaust manifold was reconfigured and made of stainless steel header pipes rather than a cast-iron manifold for improved performance and lighter weight. The increased flow from this new configuration was a key contributor to the 20 additional horsepower drawn from the new engine. This revised 3.2 L C32B engine provided a substantial increase to power output: from 274 PS (202 kW; 270 hp) to 294 PS (216 kW; 290 hp) while torque increased from 285 N⋅m (210 lb⋅ft) to 305 N⋅m (225 lb⋅ft). The net result increased the power to weight ratio of the NSX by 7%. The 4-speed automatic model retained its 3.0 L engine and 252 hp power output alongside its NA1 chassis code through the model's discontinuation in 2005. Another big change was the adoption of a 6-speed manual transmission with closer gear ratios and the addition of 3rd to 4th gear dual cone synchronisers. To handle the new engine's added torque and power the small diameter twin-disc clutch system of the 5-speed was replaced by a dual-mass low-inertia single disc clutch system. To offset the weight increase of the new 6-speed transmission and larger brake rotors, which had increased diameter from 282 mm (11.1 in) to 298 mm (11.7 in), key body parts were made with a new aluminium alloy that was up to 50% stronger allowing the thinner lighter material to be used in the doors, fenders, and front and rear deck lids without any sacrifice of strength and rigidity. Using this hi-strength alloy the net curb weight increase, despite adding many improvements, was only 10 kg (22 lb). Other notable changes included a keyless entry system, vehicle immobiliser system and inclusion of electric power steering on the hardtop coupe trims. The combination of slightly increased power and torque and a new 6-speed transmission, with ratios optimised to improve straight-line acceleration, produced better performance numbers over previous models than the modest increases would suggest. Motor Trend and Road & Track's (Feb 97) tests of the 3.2 L 6-speed equipped NSX-T (Targa) resulted in 0–60 mph acceleration times of 4.8 and 5.0 seconds and quarter-mile times of 13.3 and 13.5 seconds respectively. 0–60 mph times dropped to as low as 4.5 seconds in the 3.2-liter, coupé variant as recorded by Car and Driver in their August 1998 0–150–0 issue. The NSX proved to be the fastest ever tested in North America when tested by the magazine. When Car and Driver tested the 1999 Zanardi special edition coupé a year later it resulted in a 0–60 mph acceleration time of 4.8 seconds and a 13.2-second quarter-mile time. Magazine tests for the later face-lift NSX are more rare than when originally introduced.

=== 1997 NSX Type S ===
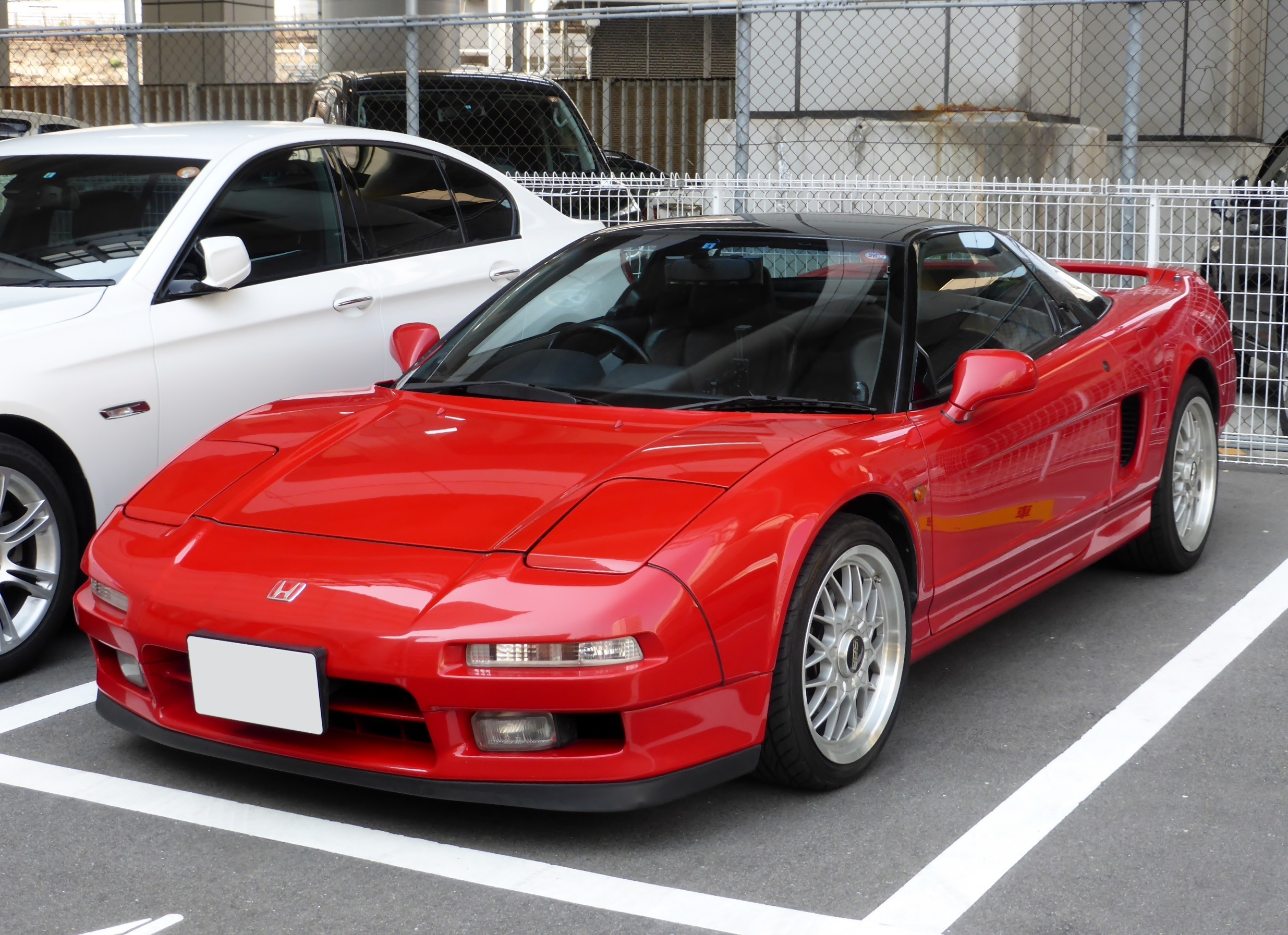
Honda NSX Type S

Along with the performance update in 1997, Japan exclusively received the NSX Type S. The Type S was intended to be a "winding road" optimised trim option and incorporated several weight-reducing features to improve performance: Titanium Shift Knob, MOMO Zagato-style steering wheel, BBS lightweight aluminium wheels(16"/17") and a lightweight rear spoiler. The Type S also carried over several weight reducing features from the earlier NSX-R: Recaro full bucket carbon-kevlar Alcantara/leather seats, mesh design engine cover, single-pane rear glass, manual rack and pinion steering and a lightweight battery. Unlike the NSX-R, which used the black roof from the original NSX, the Type S was offered with a body-colour matching roof. Overall, the weight reduction efforts resulted in a curb weight of 1,320 kg (2,910 lb) for the Type S, which was some 45 kg (99 lb) lighter than the standard NSX coupe. However, due to its premium trim level, customers could add options like navigation, electric power steering, HID xenon headlights and fog lights, partially negating some of the weight savings. Indeed, the NSX Type S was the most expensive NSX trim model available in 1997 at ¥10,357,000 (or $85,000 in 1997 dollars). Honda also extensively revised the Type S suspension to incorporate much stiffer front dampers and a thicker rear sway bar. Honda produced 209 NSX Type S units between 1997 and 2001.

=== 1997 NSX Type S-Zero (JDM) ===
Along with the Type S, Honda also offered the NSX Type S-Zero for customers who desired a track-day weekend car and who would normally purchase the now-discontinued NSX-R. Designated "Zero" to indicate extreme weight reduction, the S-Zero is a more circuit-oriented version of the standard Type S. Handling was improved for the circuit by using the NA1 NSX-R suspension but retaining the Type S' thicker 19.1 mm rear sway bar. The S-Zero also ditched the dual mass flywheel clutch and reverted to the lighter, more direct dual-disc clutch from the original NSX 5-speed transmission. Unlike the standard Type S, the S-Zero did not offer cruise control, stereo, power door locks, airbags, traction control, power steering, fog lights or a navigation system. Air conditioning, however, was the only option. Much of the sound deadening material was also removed to reduce weight. All of this weight reduction resulted in making the S-Zero 50 kg (110 lb) lighter than the Type S, weighing in at 1,270 kg (2,800 lb). Combining extreme weight reduction with the power and performance improvements of the new 3.2L engine and 6-speed transmission, the S-Zero could lap the Suzuka circuit 1.5 seconds faster than the already formidable NSX-R. Only 30 NSX Type-S Zeros were produced between 1997 and 2001, making it the rarest version of the NSX next to the five homologation special NSX-R GT cars.

=== 1999 NSX Alex Zanardi edition (USA) ===
Produced exclusively for the United States, the NSX Alex Zanardi Edition was introduced in 1999 to commemorate Alex Zanardi's two back-to-back CART IndyCar championship wins for Honda in 1997 and 1998. Only 51 examples were built, and they were available only in Formula Red to reflect the colour of the winning car Zanardi drove for Chip Ganassi Racing.

The Zanardi Edition was similar to the Japanese market NSX Type S. Visible differences between the Zanardi Edition and the Type S were the Zanardi's left-hand drive configuration, black leather and faux suede seats with red stitching, airbag-equipped Acura steering wheel, and a brushed-aluminium plaque with an engraved Acura logo, Zanardi's signature, and a serial number on the rear bulkhead. Total vehicle weight was reduced by 149 pounds (68 kg) as compared to the NSX-T, through the use of a fixed roof, lighter rear spoiler, single pane rear glass, lightweight BBS alloy wheels, a lighter battery, and a manual rack-and-pinion steering system in place of the electric power steering.

Zanardi Number 0 was a press car that also appeared in auto shows across the country. In a handling test in Road & Track's June 1999 issue, the Zanardi NSX placed second against the Dodge Viper GTS-R, Lotus Esprit, Porsche 911 Carrera 4, Ferrari F355 Spider, and Chevrolet Corvette C5 Coupé. The car was also featured in Car and Driver's July 1999 issue before being sold to a private individual.

Zanardi Number 1 belongs to Zanardi himself and was not given a North American VIN. The car is rumored to have been modified by Honda with hand-activated throttle, braking, and shifting mechanisms to accommodate Zanardi's loss of both legs resulting from his Lausitzring crash in 2001.

Zanardi numbers 2 through 50 were sold to the general public through dealers.

=== 2002 facelift ===
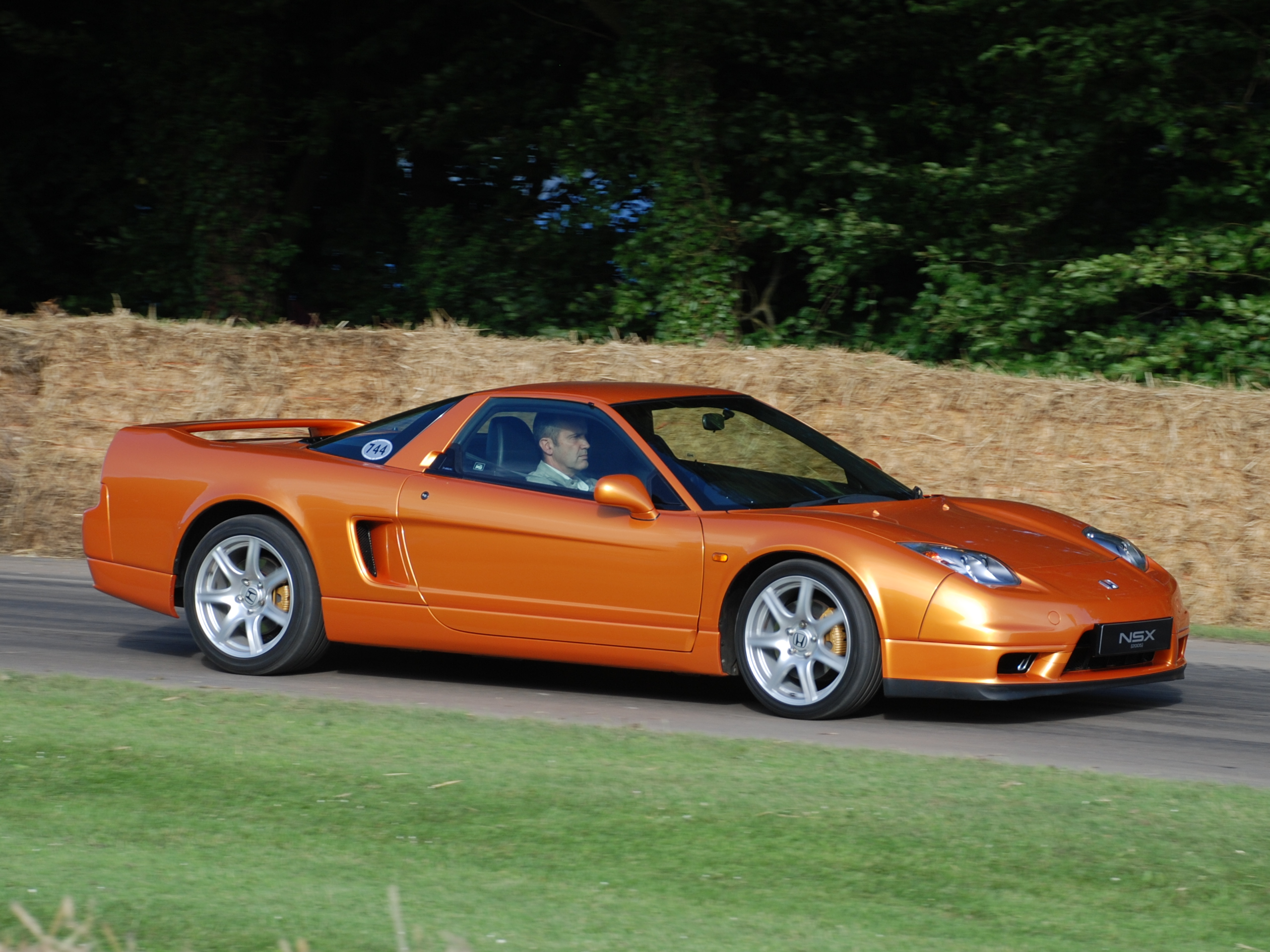
Honda NSX (post-facelift)

In December 2001, the NSX received a facelift in order to keep the car more modern looking like its competitors. The original pop-up headlamps were replaced with fixed xenon HID headlamp units, along with slightly wider rear tyres to complement a revised suspension. The gauge faces changed to a blue shade and, in 2004, the shift knob was changed to a weighted metal ball from the prior leather-wrapped plastic. Front spring rates were increased from 3.2 kg/m to 3.5 kg/m, rear spring rates were increased from 3.8 kg/m to 4.0 kg/m and the diameter of the rear stabiliser bar increased from 17.5 mm to 19.1 mm with a 2.3 mm wall thickness. The tail light housings were also revised along with the rear spoiler, which now included a small flap on the deck lid. The rear valence was lowered and wrapped around the car to revised side skirts. These changes made the car appear to sit lower on the ground.

Due to the changes in design, the drag coefficient slightly dropped to 0.30 which contributed to improvement in acceleration and top speed with an improvement in the 0–201 km/h (0–125 mph) acceleration time by 0.2 seconds and an increased top speed of 282 km/h (175 mph).

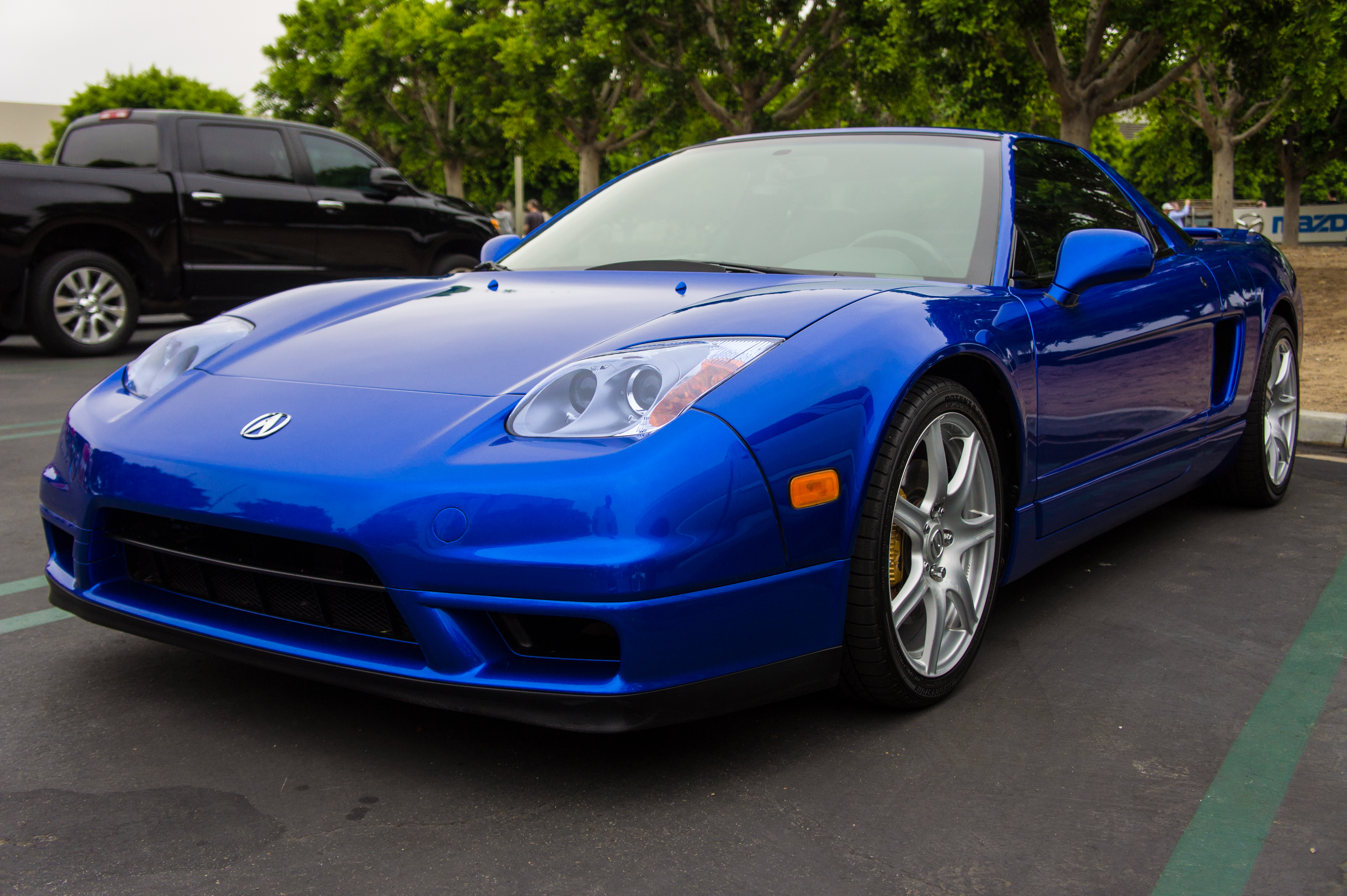
Acura NSX (post-facelift)

The hardtop coupé was no longer available in North America from 2002 onwards, but coupes could still be ordered in Japan. The NSX Type S also received the same cosmetic updates, with a slight revision to the suspension replacing the linear rate springs with progressive springs. The S-Zero trim model was cancelled due to the reintroduction of the NSX-R. The NSX was now made available in a number of exterior colours with either a matching or black interior to provide a number of possible colour combinations. A 4-speed automatic transmission with manual-type shift option also became available.

=== NSX-R facelift (2002) ===
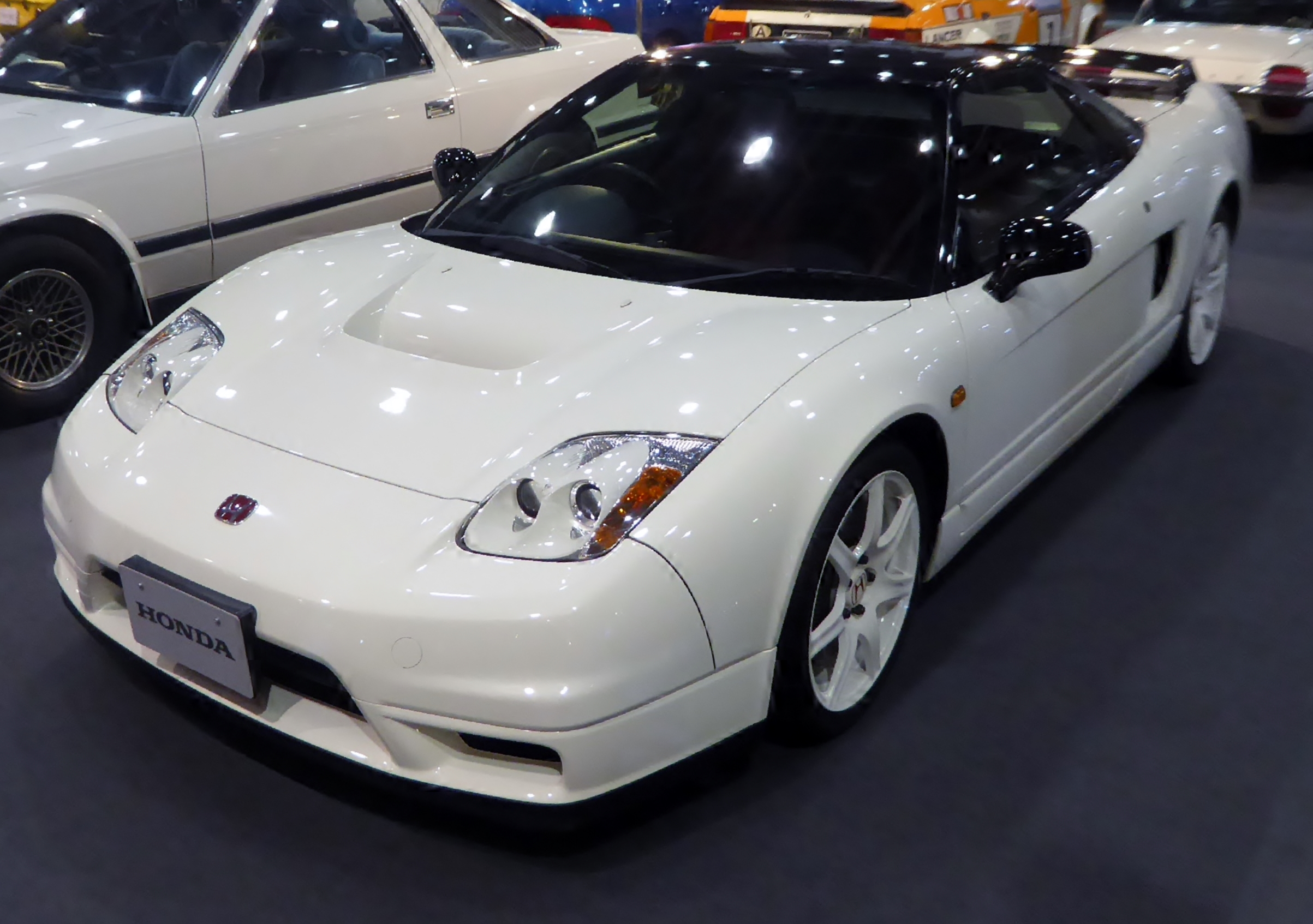
Honda NSX-R (post-facelift)

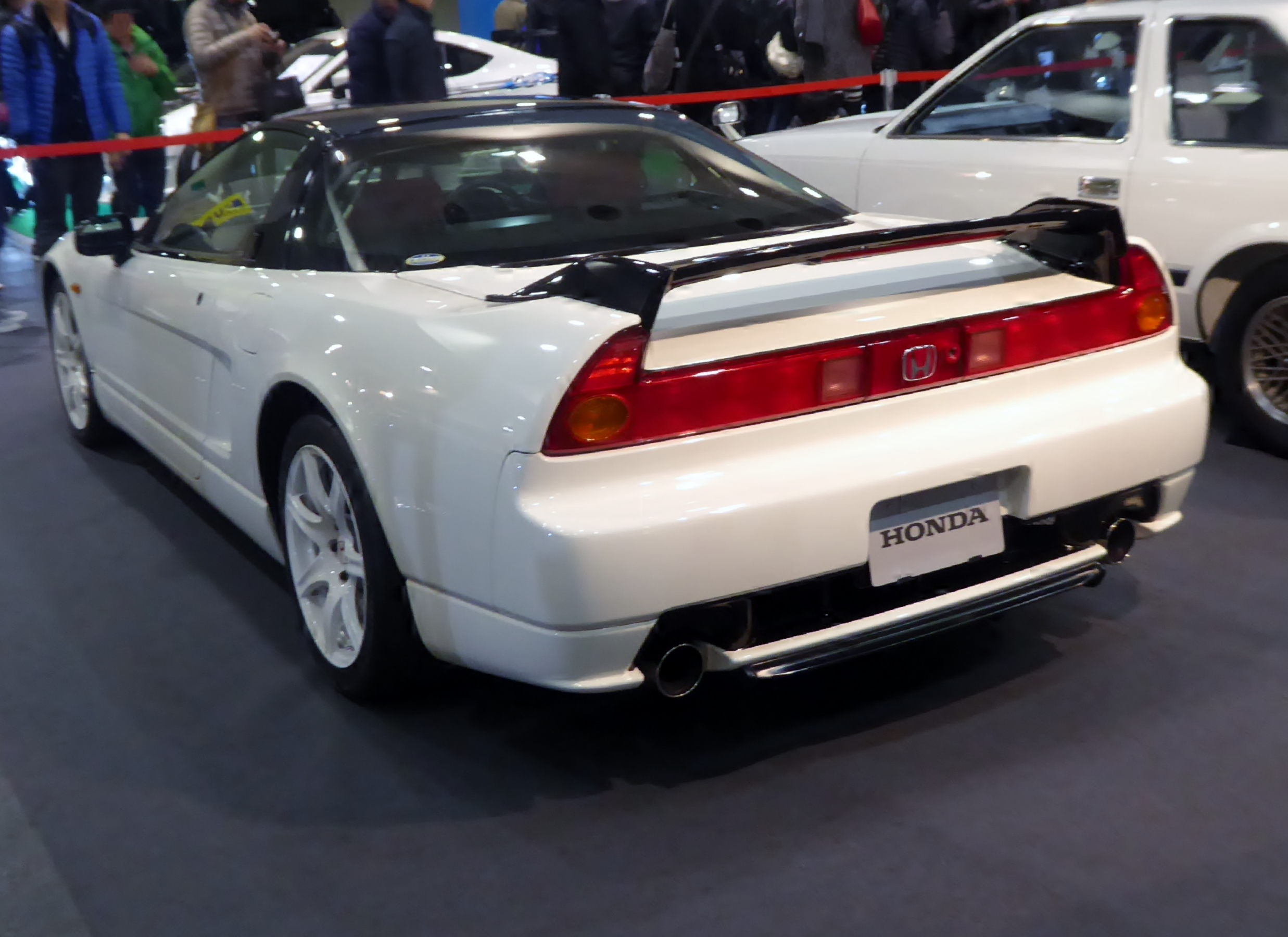
Rear view

A second iteration of the NSX-R was unveiled in 2002, again exclusively in Japan. As with the first NSX-R, weight reduction was the primary focus for performance enhancement. The NSX-R was again based on the coupé, due to its lighter weight and more rigid construction. Carbon fibre was used to a large extent throughout the body components to reduce weight, including a larger and more aggressive rear spoiler, vented hood and deck lid. The vented hood was said to be the largest one-piece carbon-fibre bonnet used on a production road car. Additionally, the original NSX-R's weight reduction techniques were repeated, including deletion of the audio system, sound insulation and air conditioning. Furthermore, the power steering was removed. A single-pane rear divider was again used, as were Recaro carbon-kevlar racing seats. Finally, larger yet lighter wheels resulted in a total weight reduction of almost 100 kg (220 lb) to 1,270 kg (2,800 lb).

The 3.2 L DOHC V6 engine received special attention as well. Each car's engine was hand-assembled by a skilled technician using techniques normally reserved for racing programs. Components of the rotating assembly (pistons, rods and crankshaft) were precision weighed and matched so that all components fell within a very small tolerance of weight differential. Then, the entire rotating assembly was balanced to a level of accuracy, ten times than that of a typical NSX engine. This balancing and blueprinting process significantly reduced parasitic loss of power due to inertial imbalance, resulting in a more powerful, free-revving powerplant with an excellent throttle response. Officially, Honda maintains that the power output of the 2002 NSX-R's engine is rated at 290 hp (220 kW), which is identical to the standard NSX. The automotive press, however, has long speculated that the true output of the engine is higher.

Creating the impression of increased power, the accelerator was re-tuned, becoming much more sensitive to movement, particularly at the beginning of the pedal's new shorter stroke. This, coupled with the harsh suspension, makes it difficult for the driver to drive smoothly at low speeds on streets with even slight bumps. The lack of power steering has also been noted by drivers as making the car tiring and hard to steer at low speed.

The result of Honda's second NSX-R effort was a vehicle that could challenge the latest sports car models on the track, despite having a base design that was more than 15 years old. For example, noted Japanese race and test driver Motoharu Kurosawa piloted a 2002 NSX-R around the Nürburgring road course in 7:56, a time equal to a Ferrari 360 Challenge Stradale. The NSX-R accomplished this feat despite being out-powered by the Ferrari by over 100 bhp (75 kW).

In 2022, Honda built a final NSX-R using spare parts and an unused chassis from the factory for collector Shinji Kawai. The chassis was originally reserved for use as a spare for racing in the JGTC and Super GT but was never used. The car has been dubbed by Honda as the "S. Kawai Special" and has the VIN R0000.

=== NSX-R GT (2005) ===
Production of NSX-R GT, as limited edition of NSX-R, was approved at Honda solely to win at the JGTC and Super GT, because its production-based race car homologation required additional handicap weight for NSX reasoning by such as relatively small aero-projected-area and mid-ship layout, and overcoming the handicap was very difficult in 2003 and 2004 seasons. As the Super GT rule required at least five production cars for any race car version to compete, the production of NSX-R GT was limited to the minimum number, and only one car was actually sold.

One clear difference between the second generation NSX-R is the addition of a non-functional garnish snorkel attached to the rear window of the car. In the JGTC NSX race cars however, this snorkel is fully functional, feeding outside air to an individual throttle body intake plenum. The NSX-R GT also has 180 mm longer and 90 mm wider body with aggressive aerodynamic components such as an extended front spoiler lip and large rear diffuser were used as well. It was also speculated that the NSX-R GT incorporates more weight savings over the NSX-R. It has the same 3.2L DOHC V6 engine.

=== JAS Tensei (2027) ===
JAS Tensei

A restomod of the NSX, designed by Pininfarina, was announced on October 2026 as a limited-production 2027 model called the Tensei, and will be produced by JAS Motorsport.

== Motorsports ==
=== 24 Hours of Le Mans ===
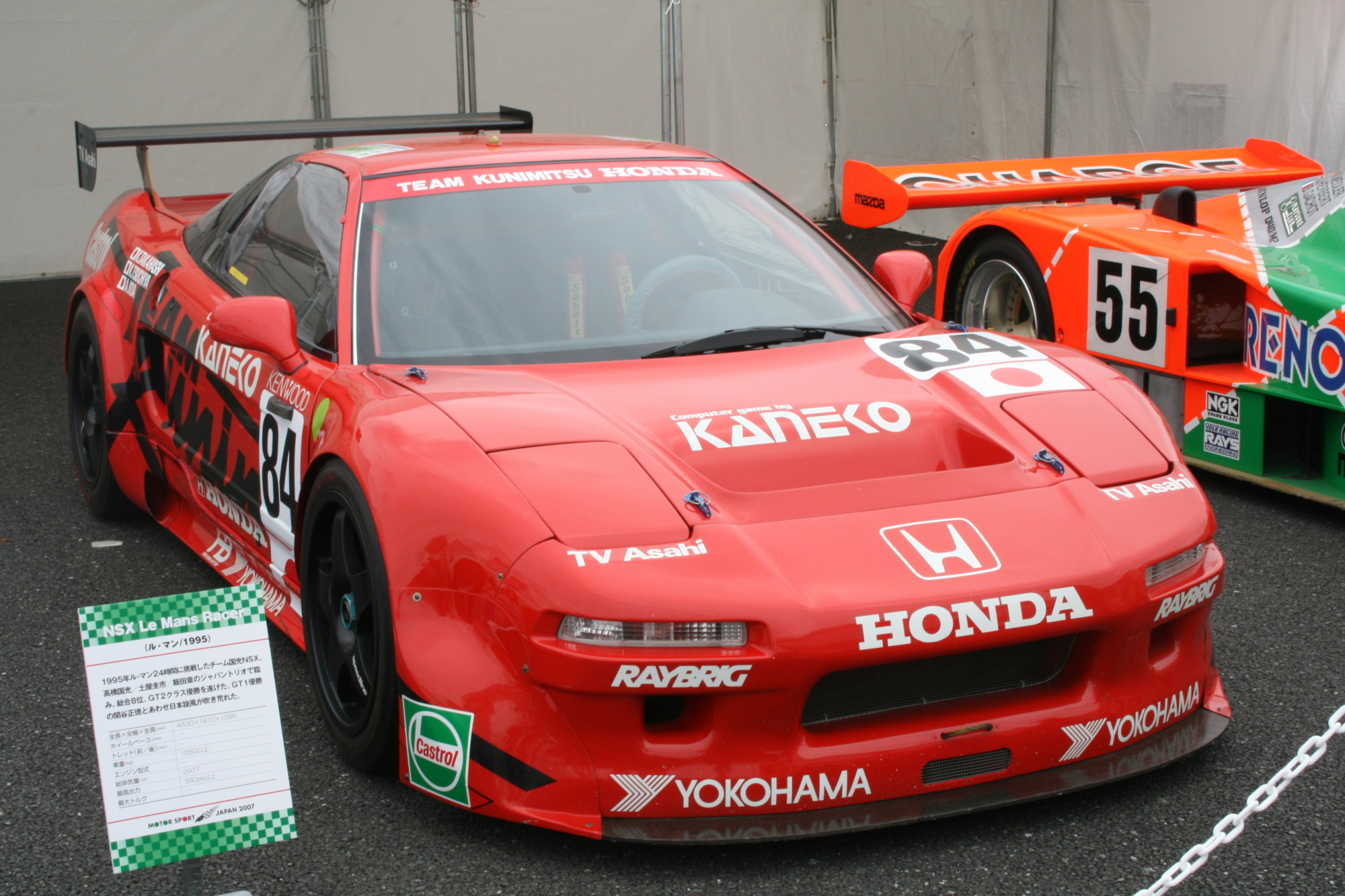
The 1995 class-winning NSX GT2

The NSX GT1 and GT2 Le Mans race cars started out as factory NSX-R shells. 11 of these shells were shipped to TC Prototypes in England, where they were extensively re-worked in preparation for race duty. A custom dry carbon fibre tub was bonded to the interior, and additional dry carbon fibre pieces were used to reinforce the already stiff chassis. The suspension was completely replaced by a custom setup with race dampers and aluminium control arms mated to center-nut style wheel hubs. TC added wide body fenders to accommodate the wider race tyres and improve downforce.

The C30A engine was extensively revised to include a dry sump oiling system, larger cams, inconel exhaust headers and, for the GT2 cars, a massive carbon fibre intake plenum with six individual throttle bodies. The GT1 engines received a turbocharger with a custom dual-plenum aluminium manifold. Using bespoke engine management, the GT2 engines produced nearly 400 bhp (a 130 bhp increase from the production version) and the turbocharged GT1 engines produced over 600 bhp, making them the most powerful engines Honda ever used in the NSX. Both engines were mated to a Hewland 6-speed sequential transmission, the use of which would later plague the cars in the Le Mans race.

The NSX made three appearances at the 24 Hours of Le Mans, in 1994, 1995, and 1996.

Three Honda NSXs were entered in the 1994 24 Hours of Le Mans. Cars numbers 46, 47 and 48 were prepared and run by team Kremer Racing Honda, with Team Kunimitsu assisting and driving the number 47 car. All were in the GT2 class, and all completed the race, but placed 14th, 16th and 18th.

Three Honda NSXs were entered in the 1995 24 Hours of Le Mans. Honda's factory team brought two NSXs which were entered in the GT1 class numbered 46 (naturally aspirated) and 47 (turbocharged). Team Kunimitsu Honda prepared and entered a naturally aspirated NSX into the GT2 class numbered 84; a fourth GT2 NSX was entered by Nakajima Racing with number 85 but failed to pre-qualify. Car 46 finished but was not classified for failing to complete 70% of the distance of the race winner. Car 47 did not finish due to clutch and gearbox failure. Car 84, driven by Keiichi Tsuchiya, Akira Iida, and Kunimitsu Takahashi, finished 8th overall winning the GT2 class after completing 275 laps. This NSX was featured in the original Gran Turismo, with the GT1 class car being featured in the Japanese version of the game instead.

For the 1996 24 Hours of Le Mans, only the Team Kunimitsu Honda NSX returned with the same drivers. It completed 305 laps to finish in the 16th position overall, and third in the GT2 class.

=== JGTC and Super GT ===
In 1996 season, prior to the formation of factory-backed team, Team Kunimitsu entered the first NSX in the series, based on the 1995 Le Mans GT2 car in specification. Without factory support, the car's best finish was seventh in the August Fuji Speedway race. For the 1997 season, Honda officially entered the series with factory-supported NSX, which featured a chassis developed by Dome, based on the collaboration experience in JTCC series with Honda Accord and engines by Mugen. The car's debut race was at the 2nd round of the series at Fuji Speedway, with a first pole position at the fifth round race at Mine Circuit.

In 1998 season, the NSX obtained pole position at all the seven rounds of the series. The car also managed its first win at the Japan Special GT-Cup in Fuji and also won at all the subsequent four remaining rounds of the series. However, the team suffered a minor setback when the #18 Dome car was disqualified from the final race of the season.

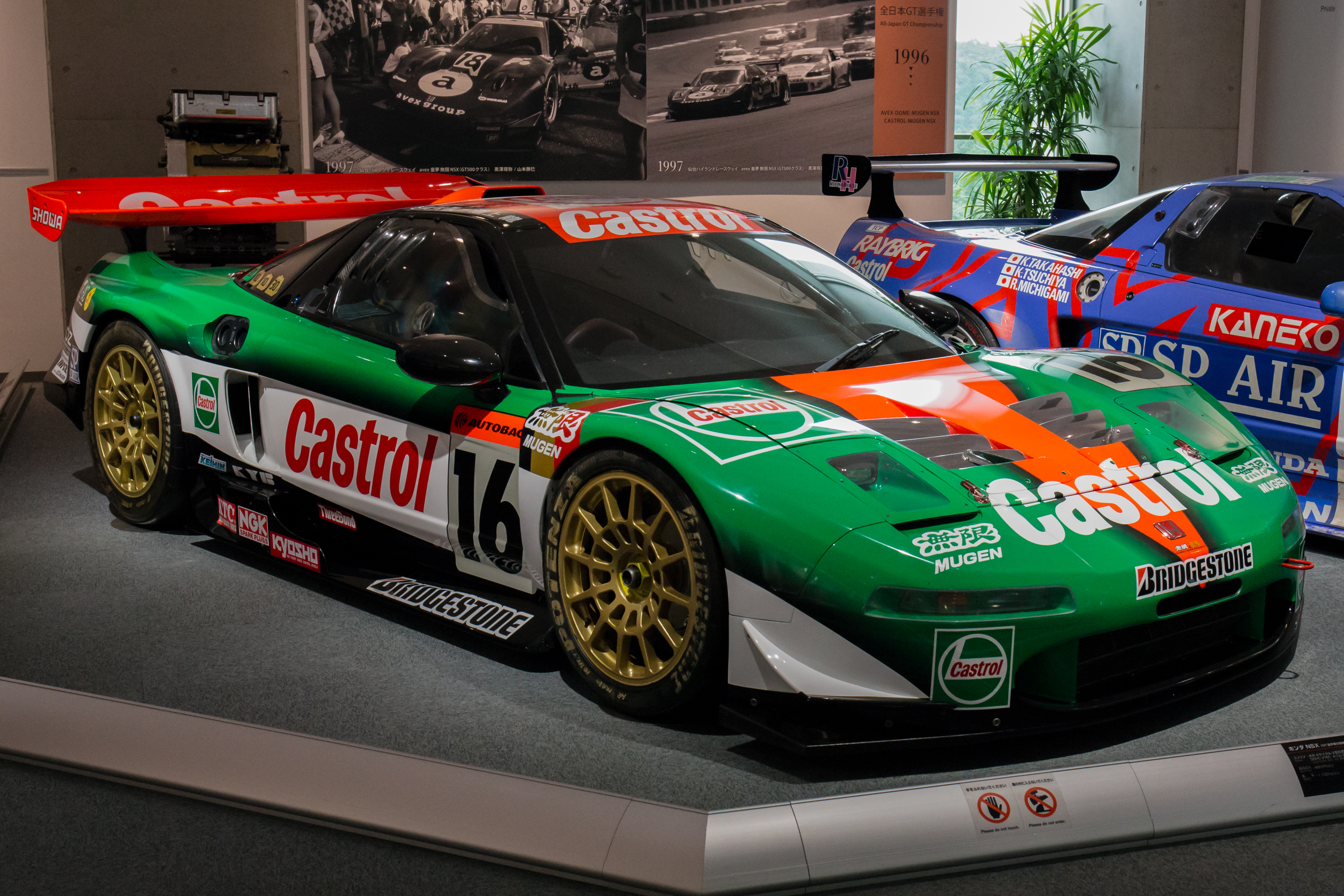
Phase 2 NSX-GT from 2000 season on display at the Honda Collection Hall

For 2000, the "Phase 2" NSX-GT machine was introduced, where the car's engine mounting was lowered and a Formula Nippon-specification transmission was used. Although the transmission was proven to be fragile, Ryo Michigami and his team, Mugen × Dome Project's #16 Castrol NSX, managed to get the first Drivers' and Teams' Championship title for Honda; he had done so without scoring a single win.

Following a facelift in 2002 to match the road car's facelift the previous year, the Phase 3 NSX-GT featured changes to the car's V6 engine to prepare for the relaxed regulations for 2003, where the car's C32B engine was mounted longitudinally instead of transversely as per the road car. Similar to the setup used in modern Lamborghinis, the gearbox is located in the center tunnel under the cockpit and is connected to the rear differential by a driveshaft.

Prior to rule changes beginning in the 2003 season, the Super GT/GT500 NSX was powered by a specially modified version of the C32B V6 engine. Using a stroke crankshaft from Toda Racing, the naturally aspirated engine displaced 3.5-litres and produced nearly 500 hp (373 kW; 507 PS). Beginning in 2004, Honda used a turbocharged C30A engine, outputting similar horsepower, but the engine cooling proved troublesome and Honda reverted to naturally aspirated C32B the following year.

For the newly renamed 2005 Super GT Series, Honda created the NSX-R GT model to allow the Phase 4 NSX-GT to allow the car to have extended overhangs, lip-spoiler and rear-diffuser as effective aerodynamics measures. This allowed the car to obtain ten pole positions and five wins in both 2005 and 2006.

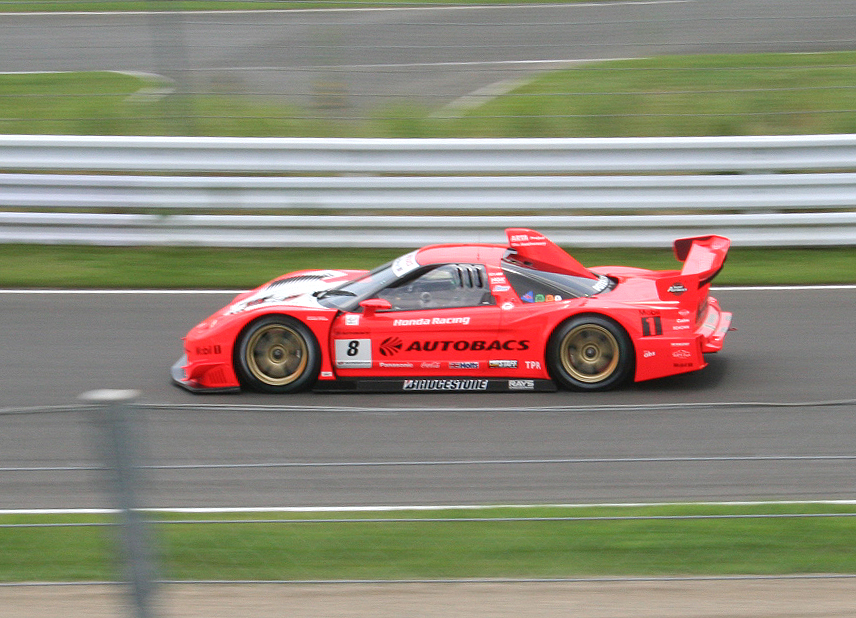
Phase 5 NSX-GT during Super GT competition in 2007 season

For the 2007 season, stepped floors was introduced to reduce aerodynamic ground effects. Even with these changes, the Phase 5 NSX-GT won both the Team Championship and Drivers' Championship thanks to Autobacs Racing Team Aguri (ARTA) with Ralph Firman and Daisuke Itō.

The NSX continued to be used as the works Honda car in the GT500 class, even though it was no longer in production, until it was replaced 2010 with the HSV-010. New 2014 regulations would render the HSV-010 obsolete; Honda's 2014-spec GT500 car was to be based on the concept version of the new NSX, followed with a Group GT3 version from 2017 onwards.

The NSX-GT was used in the series between 1997–2009, and it was one of the most successful cars to race in the series. It won 36 races, 45 pole positions, three teams' and two drivers' championships and finished runner-up in the drivers' championship six times when it didn't win it. It also won the Suzuka 1000km four times; in 1999, 2000, 2003 and 2004. It is the only Japanese car in the series to score pole position and fastest lap in every race of the season, holds the record for the most consecutive wins at six and is the first car to win the championship prior to the final race. A GT300 specification NSX won the GT300 class titles in 2004 and finished second the following year.

==== Honda NSX Super GT specifications ====
The champion machine's specification in 2007 season:
Under 2007 regulation, phase 5 NSX-GT was constructed as a new machine.

- Drivetrain: MR - longitudinally front-to-back layout
- Engine: V6 (C32B based) DOHC NA 3,494 cc
- Length: 4,610 mm - as same as NSX-R GT (2005)
- Width: 2,000 mm
- Wheelbase: 2,530 mm - as same as all NSX
- Transmission: Hewland 6-speed sequential
- Tyres: Bridgestone (Front 330/40T18, Rear 330/45R17)

The final specification in 2009 season:
NSX-GT for 2008 season was specially allowed to use as the exception of 2009 regulation with receiving performance adjustment and handicap weight.

- Drivetrain: MR - special exception in 2009 regulation which requires FR in principle.
- Engine: V6 (C32B based) DOHC NA 3,396 cc - downsized corresponding to 2009 regulation to make it equal to others

=== World Challenge ===
The NSX was entered in the SCCA World Challenge prior to the redesign in 2002. It won the championship in 1997, driven by Peter Cunningham.

=== Pikes Peak International Hill Climb ===
In 2012 Pikes Peak International Hill Climb, LoveFab Inc., led by Cody Loveland, and Honda Performance Development (HPD), led by James Robinson, brought in their 1991 Acura NSX based race cars into this field. Loveland's machine had monstrous spoilers and aerodynamic bodywork. The Robinson's machine had wide-body which is same as 1995 Le Mans race car, and his team continued to use the machine in 2013 and 2014 races with modifications.

=== Safety car ===
Since the beginning of the NSX's production, the car has been used as a safety car at the Suzuka Circuit, even for the Japanese Grand Prix in its early years of production, and is still used at the circuit. The car is also used for the same role at Twin Ring Motegi, the other circuit owned by Honda.
