= Masahiko Kageyama =

Japanese racing driver

- Nationality: Japanese
- Born: August 8, 1963 (age 63) Kanagawa Prefecture
- Retired: 2002
- Relatives: Masami Kageyama (brother)
- Debut season: 1993 (JGTC GT1)
- Starts: 56
- Wins: 6
- Best finish: 1st in 1993–1995

Previous series
- 1990-2001 1990-1996 1987-1989: Formula Nippon; Japanese Touring Car Championship; All-Japan Formula Three

Masahiko Kageyama (影山 正彦, Kageyama Masahiko; born August 8, 1963 in Kanagawa Prefecture) is a former racing driver from Japan. He participated in the Japanese Grand Touring Car series in the top category between 1993 and 2002.

Kageyama won the inaugural Japanese Grand Touring Car championship, in the Nismo Nissan Skyline GT-R R32, before winning the next two championships.

Kageyama also won the All-Japan Formula Three Championship in 1989, and the Japanese Touring Car Championship in 1993.

Along with Nissan Motorsports teammates Aguri Suzuki and Kazuyoshi Hoshino, Kageyama drove a Nissan R390 GT1 to a third-place finish at the 1998 24 Hours of Le Mans.

Kageyama is the CEO of M-Proto Inc., a supplier of brake pads, based in Fujisawa, Kanagawa. His younger brother is Masami Kageyama, who also competed in JGTC and at Le Mans.

== Racing record ==
=== Complete Japanese Formula 3000 Championship/Formula Nippon results ===
(key) (Races in bold indicate pole position) (Races in italics indicate fastest lap)

Year	Entrant	1	2	3	4	5	6	7	8	9	10	11	DC	Points
1990	Stellar International	SUZ; 15	FUJ; DNQ	MIN; 6	SUZ; Ret	SUG; 11	FUJ; Ret	FUJ; Ret	SUZ; Ret	FUJ; DNS	SUZ; 9		20th	1
1991	Stellar International	SUZ; Ret	AUT; 17	FUJ; 11	MIN; Ret	SUZ; 13	SUG; Ret	FUJ; 16	SUZ; 13	FUJ; C	SUZ; Ret	FUJ; DNQ	31st	0
1993	Nakajima Racing	SUZ; 12	SUZ; 8	MIN; 6	SUZ; Ret	AUT; C	SUG; 2	FUJ; C	FUJ; 8	SUZ; Ret	FUJ; Ret	SUZ; 11	10th	7
1994	Nakajima Racing	SUZ; 16	FUJ; Ret	MIN; 11	SUZ; Ret	SUG; 9	FUJ; Ret	SUZ; 5	FUJ; Ret	FUJ; 11	SUZ; 8		13th	2
1995	Navi Connection Racing	SUZ; 3	FUJ; C	MIN; 8	SUZ; Ret	SUG; Ret	FUJ; 6	TOK; Ret	FUJ; Ret	**SUZ**; Ret			12th	5
1996	Navi Connection Racing	SUZ; Ret	MIN; Ret	FUJ; Ret	TOK; Ret	SUZ; 16	SUG; 12	FUJ; Ret	MIN; 9	SUZ; 7	FUJ; 3		14th	4
1997	Team Impul	SUZ; Ret	MIN; Ret	FUJ; 5	SUZ; 2	SUG; 3	FUJ; Ret	MIN; 15	MOT; Ret	FUJ; 12	SUZ; 3		7th	16
1998	Maziora Team Impul	SUZ; 1	MIN; Ret	FUJ; Ret	MOT; 8	**SUZ**; 1	SUG; Ret	FUJ; C	MIN; Ret	FUJ; Ret	SUZ; 6		4th	21
1999	Speedmaster Mooncraft	SUZ; Ret	MOT; 12	MIN; Ret	FUJ; 13	SUZ; Ret	SUG; 13	FUJ; Ret	MIN; 6	MOT; 12	SUZ; 13		18th	1
2001	Takagi B-1 Car Club	SUZ; 12	MOT; Ret	MIN; Ret	FUJ; 10	SUZ; DNS	SUG; 14	FUJ; 16	MIN; Ret	MOT; Ret	SUZ; Ret		20th	0

=== Complete Japanese Touring Car Championship (-1993) results ===
Year	Team	Car	Class	1	2	3	4	5	6	7	8	9	DC	Pts
1990	Object T	Ford Sierra RS500	JTC-1	NIS; 4	SUG; 3	SUZ; 5	TSU; Ret						6th	84
1990	Object T	Nissan Skyline GT-R	JTC-1					SEN; 3	FUJ; Ret				6th	84
1991	Object T	Nissan Skyline GT-R	JTC-1	SUG; Ret	SUZ; 3	TSU; 4	SEN; Ret	AUT; 3	FUJ; 2				7th	98
1992	Impul	Nissan Skyline GT-R	JTC-1	AID; Ret	AUT; 3	SUG; 1	SUZ; Ret	MIN; Ret	TSU; 1	SEN; 1	FUJ; 6		7th	78
1993	Impul	Nissan Skyline GT-R	JTC-1	MIN; 1	AUT; 3	SUG; 2	SUZ; 3	AID; 1	TSU; 2	TOK; 1	SEN; 1	FUJ; Ret	1st	134

=== Complete Japanese Touring Car Championship (1994-) results ===
Year	Team	Car	1	2	3	4	5	6	7	8	9	10	11	12	13	14	15	16	17	18	DC	pts
1994	Nismo	Nissan Sunny	AUT; 1	AUT; 2	SUG; 1	SUG; 2	TOK; 1	TOK; 2	SUZ; 1	SUZ; 2	MIN; 1	MIN; 2	AID; 1; 21	AID; 2; 10	TSU; 1 Ret	TSU; 2; 3	SEN; 1 Ret	SEN; 2 DNS	FUJ; 1; 14	FUJ; 2; 18	22nd	10
1996	Nismo	Nissan Primera Camino	FUJ; 1; 7	FUJ; 2 Ret	SUG; 1; 8	SUG; 2; 9	SUZ; 1; 4	SUZ; 2; 6	MIN; 1; 4	MIN; 2; 1	SEN; 1; 7	SEN; 2; 6	TOK; 1 Ret	TOK; 2; 18	FUJ; 1; 3	FUJ; 2; 7					5th	63

=== Complete JGTC results ===
Year	Team	Car	Class	1	2	3	4	5	6	7	8	DC	Pts
1994	Hoshino Racing	Nissan Skyline GT-R	GT1	FUJ; 1	SEN; 2	FUJ; 2	SUG; 4	MIN; 4				**1st**	**70**
1995	Hoshino Racing	Nissan Skyline GT-R	GT1	SUZ; 1	FUJ; 10	SEN; 2	FUJ; 7	SUG; 2	MIN; 3			**1st**	**67**
1996	Team Impul	Nissan Skyline GT-R	GT500	SUZ; 8	FUJ; 5	SEN; 5	FUJ; 1	SUG; 2	MIN; Ret			4th	54
1997	Nismo	Nissan Skyline GT-R	GT500	SUZ; 5	FUJ; Ret	SEN; 14	FUJ; 9	MIN; Ret	SUG; Ret			19th	10
1998	Nismo	Nissan Skyline GT-R	GT500	SUZ; Ret	FUJ; C	SEN; 2	FUJ; 7	MOT; 11	MIN; 5	SUG; 9		8th	29
1999	Toyota Team Sard	Toyota Supra	GT500	SUZ; 16	FUJ; 15	SUG; Ret	MIN; 7	FUJ; 10	TAI; 13	MOT; Ret		22nd	5
2000	Toyota Team Sard	Toyota Supra	GT500	MOT; 10	FUJ; Ret	SUG; 6	FUJ; 2	TAI; Ret	MIN; 8	SUZ; 16		12th	25
2001	Toyota Team Sard	Toyota Supra	GT500	TAI; 7	FUJ; 7	SUG	FUJ	MOT	SUZ	MIN		21st	8
2002	Kraft	Toyota Supra	GT500	TAI; 17	FUJ; 10	SUG; Ret	SEP; 12	FUJ; 10	MOT; 15	MIN; 10	SUZ; 12	25th	3

=== 24 Hours of Le Mans results ===
Year	Team	Co-Drivers	Car	Class	Laps	Pos.	Class Pos.
1995	(Japan) NISMO	(Japan) Kazuyoshi Hoshino (Japan) Toshio Suzuki	Nissan Skyline GT-R LM	GT1	157	DNF	DNF
1996	(Japan) NISMO	(Japan) Aguri Suzuki (Japan) Masahiko Kondo	Nissan Skyline GT-R LM	GT1	209	DNF	DNF
1997	(Japan) Nissan Motorsport (United Kingdom) TWR	(Japan) Kazuyoshi Hoshino (France) Érik Comas	Nissan R390 GT1	GT1	294	12th	5th
1998	(Japan) Nissan Motorsports (United Kingdom) TWR	(Japan) Aguri Suzuki (Japan) Kazuyoshi Hoshino	Nissan R390 GT1	GT1	347	**3rd**	**3rd**
2000	(Japan) TV Asahi Team Dragon	(Japan) Toshio Suzuki (Japan) Masami Kageyama	Panoz LMP-1 Roadster-S	LMP900	340	6th	6th

Sporting positions
Preceded by none	JGTC (GT1) Champion; 1993–1994–1995	Succeeded by David Brabham; John Nielsen
