= List of extreme temperatures in Finland =

== Yearly Finnish temperature extremes 1961-2025 ==
The table below lists the Finnish Meteorological Institute's data on annual extreme temperatures in Finland since 1961.

=== Highest Temperatures ===
Year	Location	Temperature °C (°F)	Date
1961	Kemi-Tornio Airport	30.8 °C (87.4 °F)	July 14
1962	Kronoby	26.0 °C (78.8 °F)	June 20
1963	Utti	32.8 °C (91.0 °F)	August 2
1964	Kronoby	31.0 °C (87.8 °F)	June 15
1965	Utti	29.0 °C (84.2 °F)	July 21
1966	Varkaus Käpykangas	32.0 °C (89.6 °F)	June 20
1967	Utti	31.2 °C (88.2 °F)	August 3
1968	Lahti Laune	30.4 °C (86.7 °F)	June 19
1969	Naantali	31.5 °C (88.7 °F)	August 1
1970	Kemi-Tornio Airport	32.9 °C (91.2 °F)	July 20
1971	Hattula Leteensuo	29.3 °C (84.7 °F)	July 6
1972	Outokumpu	33.6 °C (92.5 °F)	July 8
1973	Anjalankoski Anjala	32.5 °C (90.5 °F)	July 6
1974	Utsjoki Kevo	32.8 °C (91.0 °F)	June 18
1975	Ruotsinpyhtää Keitala	32.0 °C (89.6 °F)	August 8
1976	Muhos Kirkonkylä Laitasaari	27.0 °C (80.6 °F)	August 14
1977	Kankaanpää Niinisalo	32.5 °C (90.5 °F)	June 15
1978	Kuopio Inkilänmäki	29.6 °C (85.3 °F)	August 1
1979	Tuusula Hyrylä	30.5 °C (86.9 °F)	June 8
1980	Lapinjärvi Ingermanninkylä	31.5 °C (88.7 °F)	July 31
1981	Kotka Sunila	29.6 °C (85.3 °F)	July 10
1982	Ylistaro Pelma	30.2 °C (86.4 °F)	July 16
1983	Kotka Sunila	32.3 °C (90.1 °F)	July 10
1984	Utti	29.1 °C (84.4 °F)	May 17
1985	Lappeenranta	30.4 °C (86.7 °F)	August 10
1986	Lapinjärvi Ingermanninkylä	31.5 °C (88.7 °F)	June 27
1987	Utsjoki Kevo	30.0 °C (86.0 °F)	July 20
1988	Utsjoki Kevo	32.9 °C (91.2 °F)	July 20
1989	Lapinjärvi Ingermanninkylä	31.1 °C (88.0 °F)	July 9
1990	Utsjoki Kevo	29.2 °C (84.6 °F)	June 25
1991	Lapinjärvi Ingermanninkylä	30.0 °C (86.0 °F)	July 31
1992	Vihti Maasoja	33.2 °C (91.8 °F)	July 17
1993	Lapinjärvi Ingermanninkylä	30.0 °C (86.0 °F)	May 20
1994	Jyväskylä	33.3 °C (91.9 °F)	July 28
1995	Ylämaa Ylijärvi	31.2 °C (88.2 °F)	June 15
1996	Utti	28.2 °C (82.8 °F)	August 21
1997	Kauhava lentokenttä	31.5 °C (88.7 °F)	July 1
1998	Joensuu	32.0 °C (89.6 °F)	June 16
1999	Joensuu, Vieremä Kaarakkala	32.5 °C (90.5 °F)	July 16
2000	Inari Sevettijärvi	32.4 °C (90.3 °F)	July 19
2001	Savonlinna Ruunavuori	31.9 °C (89.4 °F)	July 18
2002	Pori	30.0 °C (86.0 °F)	August 13
2003	Mietoinen Saari	33.3 °C (91.9 °F)	July 15
2004	Inari Sevettijärvi	29.8 °C (85.6 °F)	July 3
2005	Inari Sevettijärvi	30.8 °C (87.4 °F)	July 9
2006	Lammi Evo	32.1 °C (89.8 °F)	July 8
2007	Parikkala Koitsanlahti	30.7 °C (87.3 °F)	August 14
2008	Salo Kiikala airport	29.7 °C (85.5 °F)	June 6
2009	Jämsä (Halli) Lentoasemantie	29.8 °C (85.6 °F)	July 4
2010	Joensuu Airport	37.2 °C (99.0 °F)	July 29
2011	Ylitornio Meltosjärvi	32.8 °C (91.0 °F)	June 10
2012	Lieksa Lampela	31.0 °C (87.8 °F)	July 30
2013	Liperi Tuiskavanluoto	32.4 °C (90.3 °F)	June 26
2014	Pori Railway Station	32.8 °C (91.0 °F)	August 4
2015	Kouvola Utti Lentoportintie	33.3 °C (91.9 °F)	July 2
2016	Utsjoki Kevo	29.1 °C (84.4 °F)	July 23
2017	Utsjoki Kevo	27.6 °C (81.7 °F)	July 28
2018	Vaasa Klemettilä	33.7 °C (92.7 °F)	July 18
2019	Porvoo Emäsalo	33.7 °C (92.7 °F)	July 28
2020	Kankaanpää Niinisalo	33.5 °C (92.3 °F)	June 25
2021	Asemantaus Heinola	34.0 °C (93.2 °F)	July 15
2022	Utsjoki	32.5 °C (90.5 °F)	June 29
2023	Rauma Pyynpää	33.6 °C (92.5 °F)	August 7
2024	Asemantaus Heinola & Savilahti Kuopio	31.4 °C (88.5 °F)	June 28
2025	Oulu Airport	32.6 °C (90.7 °F)	July 31
2026	Pyhtää-Redstone Airport	31.1 °C (88.0 °F)	July 12

=== Lowest Temperatures ===
Year	Location	Temperature °C (°F)	Date
1961	Sodankylä Vuotso	−41.2 °C (−42.2 °F)	February 6
1962	Inari /Ivalo	−41.4 °C (−42.5 °F)	January 24
1963	Sodankylä Vuotso	−43.2 °C (−45.8 °F)	December 19
1964	Sodankylä Lokka	−40.4 °C (−40.7 °F)	January 26
1965	Enontekiö Kalmankaltio	−40.3 °C (−40.5 °F)	January 11
1966	Inari/Ivalo	−48.6 °C (−55.5 °F)	February 1
1967	Enontekiö Kilpisjärvi	−44.2 °C (−47.6 °F)	January 27
1968	Alajärvi Möksy	−42.0 °C (−43.6 °F)	January 12
1969	Taivalkoski kk	−41.6 °C (−42.9 °F)	February 5
1970	Utsjoki Kevo	−43.2 °C (−45.8 °F)	February 16
1971	Salla Tuntsa	−46.0 °C (−50.8 °F)	February 28
1972	Salla Tuntsa	−39.7 °C (−39.5 °F)	March 10
1973	Kittilä Kaukonen	−40.3 °C (−40.5 °F)	December 8
1974	Kittilä Pokka	−37.7 °C (−35.9 °F)	January 29
1975	Salla Naruskajärvi	−40.2 °C (−40.4 °F)	February 18
1976	Salla Naruskajärvi	−44.2 °C (−47.6 °F)	February 1
1977	Kittilä Pokka	−44.5 °C (−48.1 °F)	January 23
1978	Salla Naruskajärvi	−45.5 °C (−49.9 °F)	January 27
1979	Salla Naruskajärvi	−43.2 °C (−45.8 °F)	February 13
1980	Salla Naruskajärvi	−43.3 °C (−45.9 °F)	January 26
1981	Kittilä Pokka	−42.8 °C (−45.0 °F)	March 12
1982	Salla Naruskajärvi	−43.5 °C (−46.3 °F)	January 1
1983	Salla Naruskajärvi	−40.1 °C (−40.2 °F)	December 10
1984	Kittilä Pokka	−39.1 °C (−38.4 °F)	January 25
1985	Salla Naruskajärvi	−50.4 °C (−58.7 °F)	January 6
1986	Muonio kk Alamuonio	−41.9 °C (−43.4 °F)	December 20
1987	Salla Naruskajärvi	−45.5 °C (−49.9 °F)	January 8
1988	Salla Naruskajärvi	−41.4 °C (−42.5 °F)	December 22
1989	Kuusamo Kiutaköngäs	−37.4 °C (−35.3 °F)	January 1
1990	Inari/Ivalo	−40.6 °C (−41.1 °F)	January 11
1991	Salla Naruska	−38.5 °C (−37.3 °F)	January 29
1992	Utsjoki Kevo	−35.3 °C (−31.5 °F)	January 10
1993	Utsjoki Kevo, Kittilä Pulju and Pokka	−37.2 °C (−35.0 °F)	January 15 & 20
1994	Salla Naruska	−41.1 °C (−42.0 °F)	February 11
1995	Kittilä Pokka	−42.0 °C (−43.6 °F)	December 29
1996	Sodankylä Lisma Aapa	−37.0 °C (−34.6 °F)	January 6
1997	Kuusamo Kiutaköngäs	−41.4 °C (−42.5 °F)	February 10
1998	Sodankylä Lokka	−43.1 °C (−45.6 °F)	February 17
1999	Kittilä Pokka	−51.5 °C (−60.7 °F)	January 28
2000	Kuusamo Kiutaköngäs	−36.5 °C (−33.7 °F)	December 27
2001	Pyhäjärvi Ol. Ojakylä	−42.5 °C (−44.5 °F)	February 8
2002	Taivalkoski Fire Station	−40.7 °C (−41.3 °F)	December 31
2003	Kuusamo Kiutaköngäs	−41.9 °C (−43.4 °F)	January 7
2004	Salla Naruska	−38.7 °C (−37.7 °F)	February 11
2005	Salla Naruska	−36.5 °C (−33.7 °F)	January 29
2006	Kittilä Pokka	−43.6 °C (−46.5 °F)	January 20
2007	Salla Naruska	−39.9 °C (−39.8 °F)	February 6
2008	Kittilä Pokka	−33.7 °C (−28.7 °F)	February 24
2009	Inari Sevettijärvi	−37.6 °C (−35.7 °F)	February 7
2010	Kuhmo Kalliojoki	−41.3 °C (−42.3 °F)	February 20
2011	Salla Naruska	−41.8 °C (−43.2 °F)	February 18
2012	Inari Kaamanen	−42.7 °C (−44.9 °F)	February 6
2013	Sodankylä Vuotso	−39.7 °C (−39.5 °F)	December 9
2014	Utsjoki Kevojärvi	−40.7 °C (−41.3 °F)	January 20
2015	Utsjoki Kevojärvi	−39.6 °C (−39.3 °F)	January 11
2016	Muonio Kirkonkylä	−41.2 °C (−42.2 °F)	January 7
2017	Muonio Kirkonkylä	−41.7 °C (−43.1 °F)	January 5
2018	Utsjoki Kevo Kevojärvi	−37.1 °C (−34.8 °F)	February 4
2019	Utsjoki Kevo Kevojärvi	−39.1 °C (−38.4 °F)	February 5
2020	Utsjoki Kevo Kevojärvi	−41.1 °C (−42.0 °F)	December 27
2021	Utsjoki Kevo Kevojärvi	−39.7 °C (−39.5 °F)	February 20
2022	Enontekiö Airport	−35.7 °C (−32.3 °F)	January 8
2023	Kittilä Airport	−37.5 °C (−35.5 °F)	March 24
2024	Enontekiö Airport	−44.3 °C (−47.7 °F)	January 5
2025	Tulppio, Savukoski	−39.6 °C (−39.3 °F)	February 4
2026	Tulppio, Savukoski	−42.8 °C (−45.0 °F)	January 9

== All-Time Temperature Records ==
=== Highest Temperature Ever Recorded ===
Year	Location	Temperature °C (°F)	Date
2010	Joensuu Airport	37.2 °C (99.0 °F)	July 29

=== Lowest Temperature Ever Recorded ===
Year	Location	Temperature °C (°F)	Date
1999	Kittilä Pokka	−51.5 °C (−60.7 °F)	January 28
