= Suzuka 1000 km =

Endurance sports car event

Suzuka 1000km Suzuka 10 Hours (2018–2019)

Intercontinental GT Challenge
- Venue: Suzuka Circuit
- First race: 1966
- Duration: 6 hours 30 minutes 1000 kilometres (1966–1973, 1980–2008, 2012–2017, 2025–present); 700 kilometres (2009–2010); 500 kilometres (2011); 10 hours (2018–2019)
- Most wins (driver): (Japan) Kunimitsu Takahashi (4)
- Most wins (manufacturer): (Germany) Porsche (12)

The Suzuka 1000km, also known as the Suzuka Summer Endurance Race, is an annual sports car endurance race that has been held annually at the Suzuka Circuit in Mie Prefecture, Japan since 1966.

Since 2018, the Suzuka 1000km has been included as part of the SRO Intercontinental GT Challenge series. Previously, the race has been run as both a standalone endurance race, and as part of various national and international championships including the Super GT Series, FIA GT Championship, All-Japan Endurance/Sports Prototype Championship, and World Sportscar Championship.

== History ==
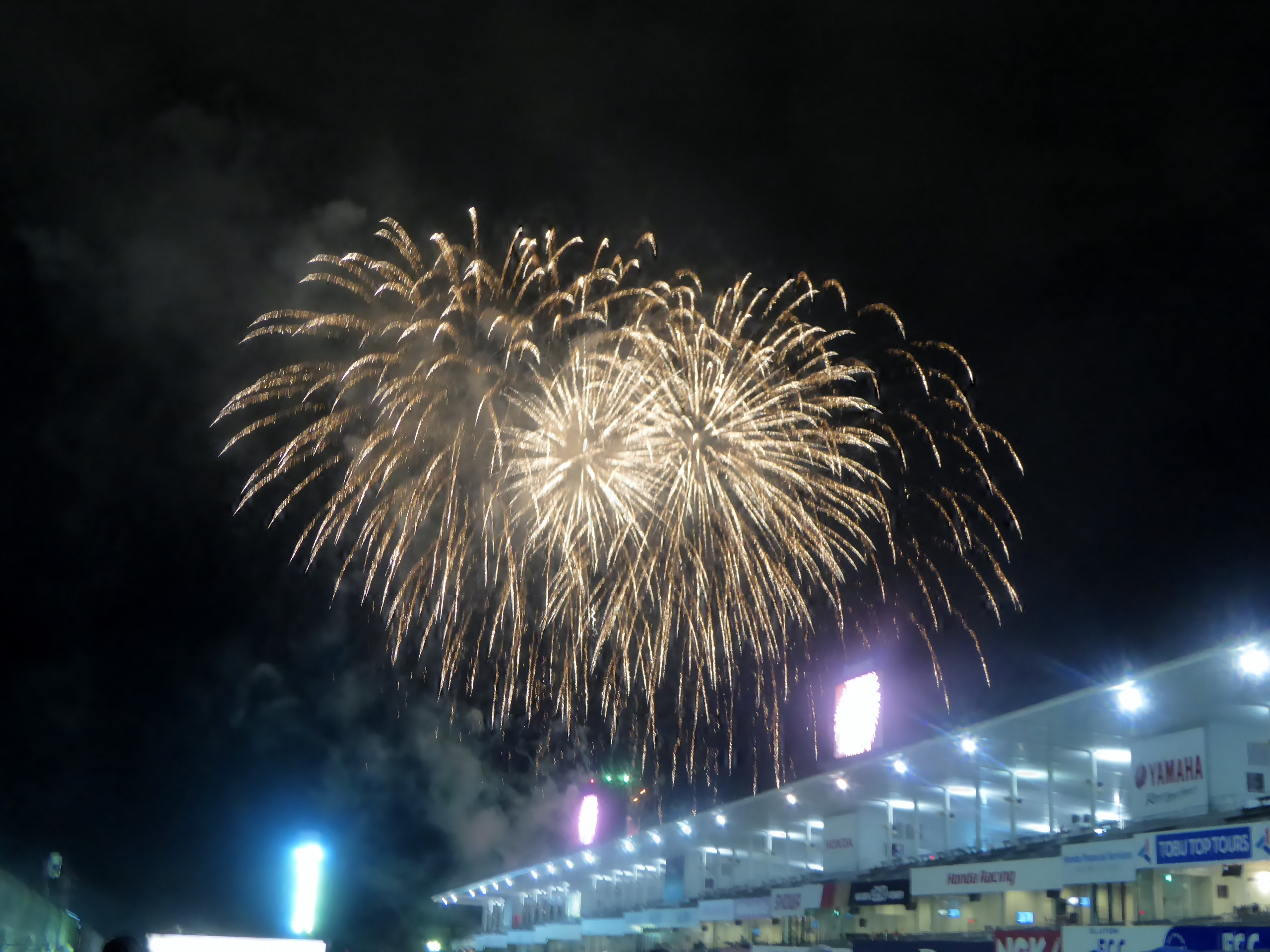
Fireworks after the 2015 race

=== Suzuka 1000km (1966–1973, 1980–2017) ===
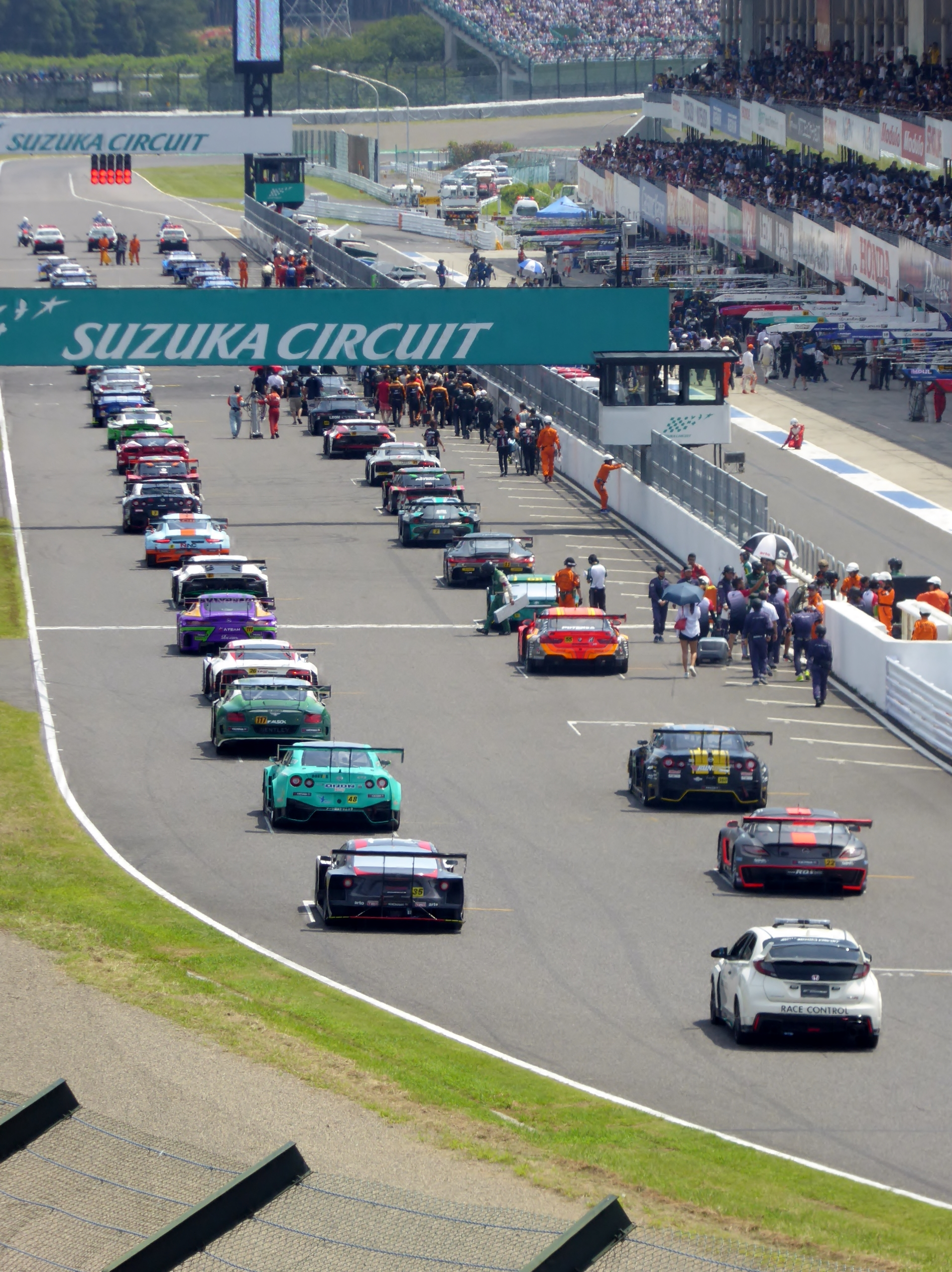
Starting grid before the 2017 race

The Suzuka 1000km was first held on 26 June 1966. It was one of three long-distance endurance races held annually at Suzuka Circuit during the 1960s, alongside the Suzuka 500km and Suzuka 12 Hours. These three races would form the short-lived Suzuka Circuit Endurance Series which was run from 1967 to 1970.

The race went on hiatus from 1974 until 1979 as a consequence of the 1970s energy crisis, but returned in 1980 as a non-championship endurance race, and was held in the fourth weekend of August for the first time. With the exception of the 1989 race that was delayed to December due to inclement weather, the Suzuka 1000km would continue to take place in the third or fourth weekend of August every year through 2019. Foreign teams entered the race for the first time in 1981 when the event renamed to the International Suzuka 1000km.

From 1983 to 1991, the International Suzuka 1000km was part of the All Japan Endurance Championship (renamed to the All Japan Sports Prototype Championship in 1987). In 1992, the race was added to the FIA World Sportscar Championship calendar, but the series folded after the 1992 season, which meant that the 1993 race would ultimately be run as a non-championship round.

In 1994, the Suzuka 1000km was added to the inaugural BPR Global GT Series calendar. Pokka became the new title sponsor of the race, and the Pokka 1000km continued as a championship round of both the BPR Global GT Series and its successor, the FIA GT Championship, through 1998.

When the race was dropped from the FIA GT calendar in 1999, the Pokka 1000km reverted to a non-championship endurance race. Through 2005, the race was open to GT500 and GT300 cars from the All Japan Grand Touring Car Championship (JGTC), as well as cars from the Super Taikyu Series and the Suzuka Circuit Clubman races.

On 12 August 2005, it was announced that the race would become part of the recently renamed Super GT Series championship, beginning in 2006. Upon its inclusion, the Suzuka 1000km became the longest and most prestigious event on the Super GT calendar during this time period, and also paid the most championship points of any round on the calendar.

Due to the effects of the Great Recession in Japan, the race was shortened to 700 kilometres from 2009 to 2010, and the race was renamed to the Pokka GT Summer Special. A second national crisis, the Great Tōhoku earthquake and tsunami, led to the event being shortened further to 500 kilometres in 2011. The original 1000 kilometre distance and race name was restored from 2012.

=== Suzuka 10 Hours (2018–2019) ===
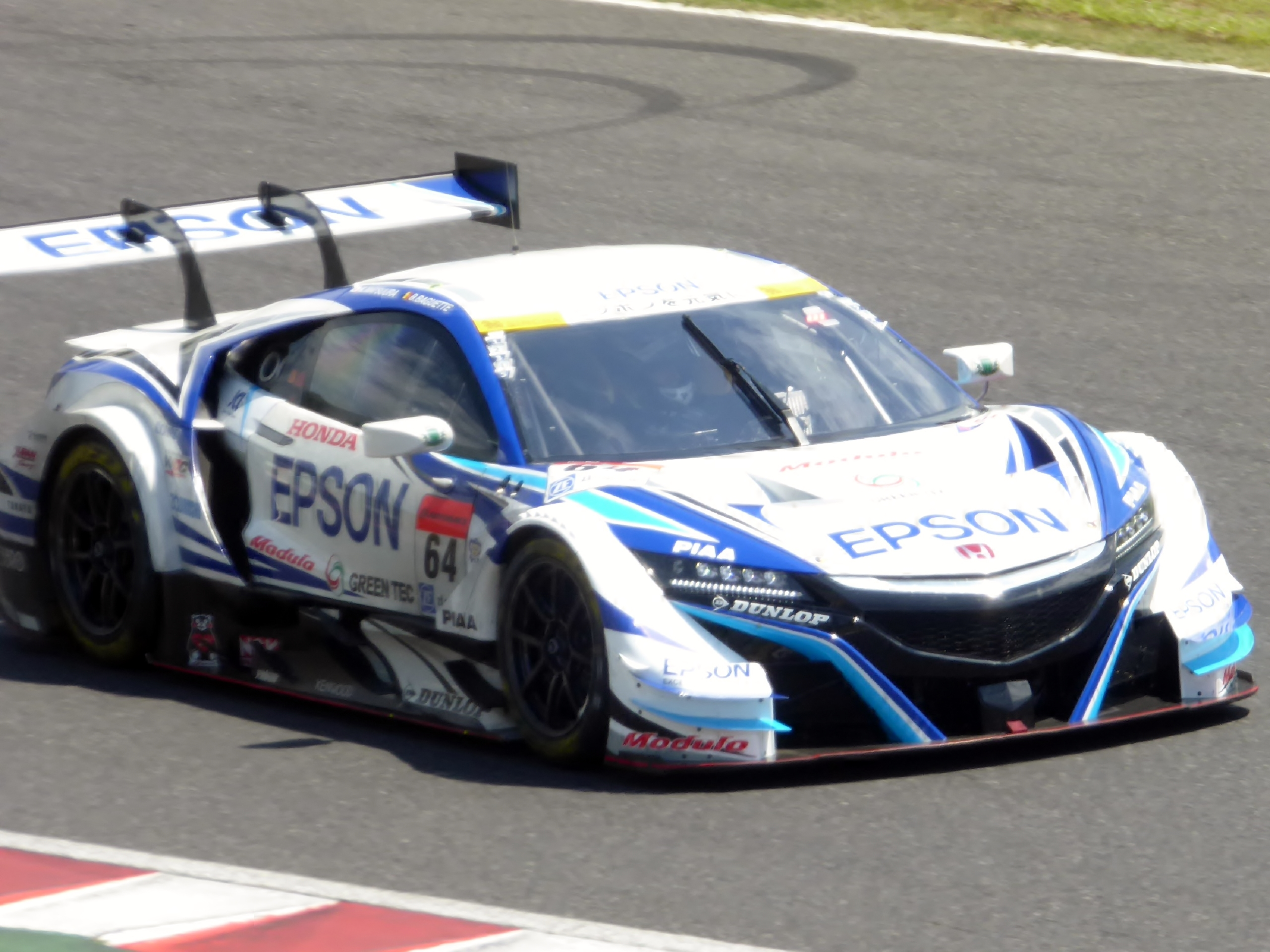
Nakajima Racing Honda won the final Super GT Suzuka 1000km in 2017

On 4 March 2017, it was announced that the GT Association (GTA) and Stephane Ratel Organisation (SRO) would join forces to promote a new ten-hour summer endurance race for FIA-GT3 and JAF-GT300 (now GTA-GT300) sports cars, known as the Suzuka 10 Hours. The 46th annual Suzuka 1000km, held that year as part of the Super GT Series, would be the last edition of the race run in its original format.

The Suzuka 10 Hours became part of the Intercontinental GT Challenge championship in 2018, replacing the Sepang 12 Hours as the series' Asian round. The reformatted race attracted top teams and drivers from international GT3 racing, as well as teams from Super GT and Super Taikyu, by offering a ¥100,000,000 prize purse with the overall winner receiving ¥30,000,000.

=== Hiatus and return (2025–present) ===
The 2020 Suzuka 10 Hours, which had originally been scheduled for 23 August, was one of numerous motorsports events that were cancelled in the wake of the COVID-19 pandemic and the travel restrictions enacted in Japan during this time. The race was set to return on 22 August 2021, but with strict travel restrictions still in place during the pandemic, the 2021 race was also cancelled.

In 2022 and 2023, Suzuka's place as the Asian round on the Intercontinental GT Challenge calendar was taken by the Gulf 12 Hours at Yas Marina Circuit.

During the 2024 SRO press conference at Spa-Francorchamps, Stephane Ratel announced that the Suzuka 1000km would return to the Intercontinental GT Challenge in 2025. The return date of 14 September 2025 was officially confirmed by Japan Automobile Federation (JAF). The revived Suzuka 1000 km would allow entries from GT300 teams to use GTA-GT300 cars, after an agreement between SRO and the GT Association (GTA) was reached in late 2024.

Although it would retain the race's original title, the revived Suzuka 1000km would be run as a timed race with a six-hour, 30-minute duration. This was done in consideration of stint length and total drive time requirements, and in order to try and reach the nominal 1,000 km distance.

Beginning in 2027, the Suzuka 1000km will count towards the Super GT Series GT300 championship, and teams from Super GT will be allowed to race on Dunlop tyres used in the series against SRO-aligned teams with Pirelli tyres.

== Winners ==
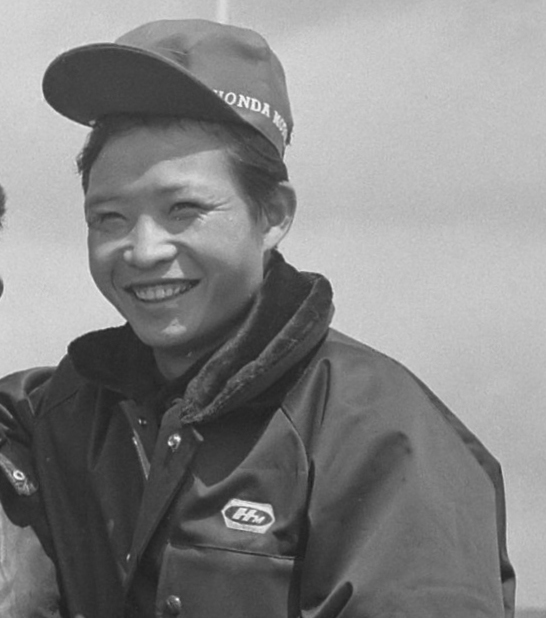
Kunimitsu Takahashi has won the Suzuka 1000km four times, more than any other driver

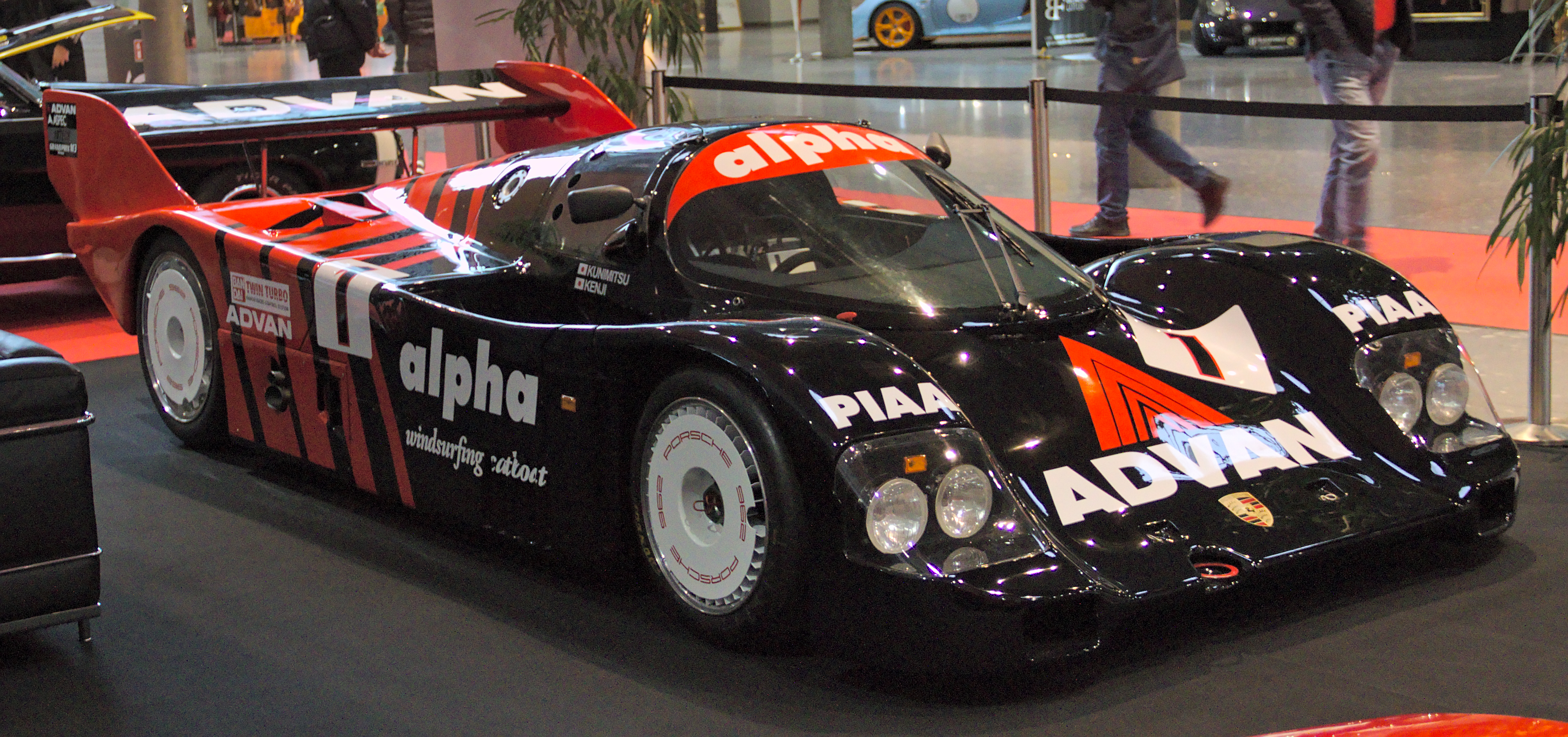
Porsche has won the Suzuka 1000km 12 times as a manufacturer with cars such as the 962C

Among drivers, Kunimitsu Takahashi holds the all-time record with four overall victories at the Suzuka 1000 km. Five other drivers – Daisuke Ito, Ryo Michigami, Sébastien Philippe, Juichi Wakisaka, and Naoki Nagasaka (Note: Naoki Nagasaka was entered as part of the winning team in 1991 but did not drive during the race.) have won the event three times overall.

11 previous winners of the Suzuka 1000km have also won the 24 Hours of Le Mans: Henri Pescarolo, Vern Schuppan, Masanori Sekiya, Stanley Dickens, Yannick Dalmas, Derek Warwick, JJ Lehto, André Lotterer, Benoît Tréluyer, Loïc Duval, and Kazuki Nakajima. In addition, Marcel Tiemann, Bernd Schneider, Frédéric Makowiecki, Maro Engel, Kelvin van der Linde, Dries Vanthoor, Frédéric Vervisch, and Raffaele Marciello have also won the Nürburgring 24 Hours.

Other notable former winners include three-time 24 Hours of Daytona winner Bob Wollek, 1989 Japanese Grand Prix winner Alessandro Nannini, 2015 FIA World Endurance Drivers' Champion and Formula One Grand Prix winner Mark Webber, four-time Super GT GT500 Drivers' Champion Ronnie Quintarelli, all-time GT500 class wins leader Tsugio Matsuda, and 2018 and 2020 Japanese "double champion" Naoki Yamamoto.

In recent years, the Suzuka 1000km has drawn interest from previous Formula One World Champions, many of whom had raced at Suzuka Circuit for years during their F1 careers. 2009 champion Jenson Button made his Super GT debut in the 2017 running of the Suzuka 1000 km, and in 2019, two-time world champion Mika Häkkinen returned to compete at the Suzuka 10 Hours.

Porsche has more victories in the race than any manufacturer – twelve in total, spanning from 1967 to 2026. The most successful Japanese marques are Honda and Toyota, who have each won the race eight times overall, just ahead of Nissan with seven victories. Toyota's Lexus luxury brand has also won the race five times representing Toyota in the GT500 class of Super GT, from 2006 to 2017.

=== List of winners ===
Year	Overall winner(s)	Entrant	Car	Series	Time
1000 km distance, 6.004 km circuit, 167 laps
1966	(Japan) Sachio Fukuzawa (Japan) Tomohiko Tsutsumi	(Japan) Team Toyota	Toyota 2000GT	Non-championship	8:02:13.9
1967	(Japan) Shintaro Taki (Japan) Kenjiro Tanaka	(Japan) Taki Racing Team	Porsche 906	Suzuka Circuit Endurance Series	7:39:21.7
1968	(Japan) Sachio Fukuzawa (Japan) Hiroshi Fushida	(Japan) Team Toyota	Toyota 7	Suzuka Circuit Endurance Series	6:59:25.6
1969	(Japan) Tomohiko Tsutsumi (Japan) Jiro Yoneyama	(Japan) Tudor Watch Racing Team	Porsche 906	Suzuka Circuit Endurance Series	7:11:23.2
1970	(Japan) Hiromi Nishino (Note: Incorrectly listed in some sources as "Kawakami Nishino".) (Japan) Koji Fujita	(Japan) Sports Car Club Nissan Osaka	Nissan Fairlady Z432	Suzuka Circuit Endurance Series	7:49:19.6
1971	(Japan) Yoshimasa Kawaguchi (Japan) Hiroshi Fushida	(Japan) Yoshimasa Kawaguchi	Porsche 910	Non-championship	7:03:44.6
1972	(Japan) Harukuni Takahashi (Japan) Kenichi Takeshita	(Japan) Toyota Motor Sports Club	Toyota Celica 1600GT-R	Non-championship	6:38:02.4; 140 laps, 840 km (Note: 1972 Race was stopped after 140 laps due to bad weather.)
1973	(Japan) Kunimitsu Takahashi (Japan) Kenji Tohira	(Japan) Sports Car Club Nissan	Nissan Fairlady 240Z-R	Non-championship	6:24:35.9; 150 laps, 900 km (Note: 1973 Race was stopped after 150 laps due to bad weather.)
1974 – 1979	Not held				
1980	(Japan) Hironobu Tatsumi (Japan) Naoki Nagasaka	(Japan) Red Carpet Racing Team	March 75S-Mazda	Non-championship	6:30:35.07; 148 laps, 888 km (Note: 1980 Race was stopped after 148 laps due to bad weather.)
1981	(France) Bob Wollek (France) Henri Pescarolo	(West Germany) Italiya-Kremer Racing	Porsche 935/K3	Non-championship	6:51:20.56
1982	(Japan) Fumiyasu Sato (Japan) Naoki Nagasaka	(Japan) Auto Beaurex Motor Sports	BMW M1	Non-championship	6:42:41.92; 166 laps (Note: 1982 Race winner received 1 lap deduction penalty post-race.)
1000 km distance, 6.033 km circuit, 166 laps
1983	(Japan) Naohiro Fujita (Australia) Vern Schuppan	(Japan) Trust Racing Team	Porsche 956	All-Japan Endurance Championship	6:40:24.91
1000 km distance, 5.943 km circuit, 169 laps
1984	(Japan) Kunimitsu Takahashi (Japan) Kenji Takahashi (United Kingdom) Geoff Lees	(Japan) Advan Sports Nova	Porsche 956	All-Japan Endurance Championship	6:29:32.91
1000 km distance, 5.912 km circuit, 170 laps
1985	(Japan) Kunimitsu Takahashi (Japan) Kenji Takahashi	(Japan) Advan Sports Nova	Porsche 962C	All-Japan Endurance Championship	6:22:57.516
1986	(Japan) Jiro Yoneyama (Note: Jiro Yoneyama did not drive during the race.) (Japan) Hideki Okada (Japan) Tsunehisa Asai	(Japan) FromA Racing	Porsche 956	All-Japan Endurance Championship	6:20:26.745
1000 km distance, 5.859 km circuit, 171 laps
1987	(United Kingdom) Geoff Lees (Japan) Masanori Sekiya (Japan) Hitoshi Ogawa	(Japan) Toyota Team TOM'S	Toyota 87C	All-Japan Sports Prototype Championship	6:27:02.449
1988	(Japan) Hideki Okada (Sweden) Stanley Dickens	(Japan) FromA Racing	Porsche 962C	All-Japan Sports Prototype Championship	6:08:21.517
1989	(Japan) Kunimitsu Takahashi (Sweden) Stanley Dickens	(Japan) Advan Alpha Nova	Porsche 962C	All-Japan Sports Prototype Championship	5:56:56.701
1990	(Japan) Kazuyoshi Hoshino (Japan) Toshio Suzuki	(Japan) Nissan Motorsports	Nissan R90CP	All-Japan Sports Prototype Championship	5:51:40.225
1000 km distance, 5.864 km circuit, 171 laps
1991	(Austria) Roland Ratzenberger (France) Pierre-Henri Raphanel (Japan) Naoki Nagasaka (Note: Naoki Nagasaka did not drive during the race.)	(Japan) Toyota Team SARD	Toyota 91C-V	All-Japan Sports Prototype Championship	5:44:52.513
1992	(United Kingdom) Derek Warwick (France) Yannick Dalmas	(France) Peugeot Talbot Sport	Peugeot 905 Evo 1B	FIA World Sportscar Championship	5:30:09.627
1993	(Japan) Takao Wada (Japan) Toshio Suzuki	(Japan) Italiya Sports Nissan	Nissan R92CP	Non-championship	5:53:09.590
1994	(France) Jean-Pierre Jarier (France) Bob Wollek (Spain) Jesús Pareja	(France) Larbre Competition	Porsche 911 Turbo S LM-GT	BPR Global GT Series	6:25:09.415; 162 laps (Note: 1994 Race was stopped after 163 laps (956 km). Race winner received 1 lap deduction penalty post-race.)
1995	(United Kingdom) Ray Bellm (Brazil) Maurizio Sandro Sala (Japan) Masanori Sekiya	(United Kingdom) Gulf Racing/GTC	McLaren F1 GTR	BPR Global GT Series	6:38:21.371
1996	(United Kingdom) Ray Bellm (United Kingdom) James Weaver (Finland) JJ Lehto	(United Kingdom) Gulf Racing/GTC Motorsport	McLaren F1 GTR	BPR Global GT Series	6:18:48.637
1997	(Italy) Alessandro Nannini (Germany) Marcel Tiemann (Germany) Bernd Schneider (Note: Bernd Schneider changed cars during the race after starting in a different AMG-Mercedes entry.)	(Germany) AMG-Mercedes	Mercedes-Benz CLK-GTR	FIA GT Championship	5:59:31.003
1998	(Germany) Bernd Schneider (Australia) Mark Webber	(Germany) AMG-Mercedes	Mercedes-Benz CLK LM	FIA GT Championship	5:48:58.452
1999	(Japan) Osamu Nakako (Japan) Ryo Michigami (Japan) Katsutomo Kaneishi	(Japan) Mugen x Dome Project	Honda NSX GT500	Non-championship	6:17:46.665
2000	(Japan) Juichi Wakisaka (Japan) Katsutomo Kaneishi (Japan) Daisuke Ito	(Japan) Mugen x Dome Project	Honda NSX GT500	Non-championship	6:14:47.171
2001	(Japan) Hironori Takeuchi (Japan) Yuji Tachikawa (Japan) Shigekazu Wakisaka	(Japan) Toyota Team Cerumo	Toyota Supra GT500	Non-championship	6:07:29.393
1000 km distance, 5.821 km circuit, 172 laps
2002	(Japan) Juichi Wakisaka (Japan) Akira Iida (Japan) Shigekazu Wakisaka	(Japan) Esso Toyota Team LeMans	Toyota Supra GT500	Non-championship	6:10:44.008
1000 km distance, 5.807 km circuit, 173 laps
2003	(Japan) Ryo Michigami (France) Sébastien Philippe	(Japan) Dome Racing Team	Honda NSX GT500	Non-championship	6:03:28.033
2004	(Japan) Ryo Michigami (France) Sébastien Philippe (Japan) Daisuke Ito	(Japan) Dome Racing Team	Honda NSX GT500	Non-championship	6:08:47.528
2005	(Macau) André Couto (Italy) Ronnie Quintarelli (Japan) Hayanari Shimoda (Note: Hayanari Shimoda did not drive during the race.)	(Japan) Toyota Team SARD	Toyota Supra GT500	Non-championship	6:26:41.366; 170 laps, 987 km
2006	(France) Benoît Tréluyer (Japan) Kazuki Hoshino (France) Jérémie Dufour	(Japan) Team Impul	Nissan Fairlady Z GT500	Super GT Series	5:57:45.468
2007	(Germany) André Lotterer (Japan) Juichi Wakisaka (United Kingdom) Oliver Jarvis (Note: Oliver Jarvis did not drive during the race.)	(Japan) Toyota Team TOM'S	Lexus SC430 GT500	Super GT Series	6:04:10.983
2008	(Japan) Tsugio Matsuda (France) Sébastien Philippe	(Japan) Team Impul	Nissan GT-R GT500	Super GT Series	5:56:31.327
700 km distance, 5.807 km circuit, 121 laps
2009	(Japan) Hiroaki Ishiura (Japan) Kazuya Oshima	(Japan) Lexus Team Kraft	Lexus SC430 GT500	Super GT Series	4:16:02.744
2010	(Republic of Ireland) Ralph Firman (Japan) Yuji Ide (Japan) Takashi Kobayashi (Note: Takashi Kobayashi did not drive during the race.)	(Japan) Autobacs Racing Team Aguri	Honda HSV-010 GT GT500	Super GT Series	4:07:10.085
500 km distance, 5.807 km circuit, 87 laps
2011	(Japan) Takashi Kogure (France) Loïc Duval	(Japan) Weider Honda Racing	Honda HSV-010 GT GT500	Super GT Series	3:16:09.255; 86 laps, 499 km (Note: 2011 Race was stopped after 86 laps for reaching the time limit.)
1000 km distance, 5.807 km circuit, 173 laps
2012	(Japan) Masataka Yanagida (Italy) Ronnie Quintarelli	(Japan) MOLA	Nissan GT-R GT500	Super GT Series	5:59:01.662
2013	(France) Frédéric Makowiecki (Japan) Naoki Yamamoto	(Japan) Weider Modulo Dome Racing	Honda HSV-010 GT GT500	Super GT Series	5:55:04.565
2014	(Japan) Kazuki Nakajima (United Kingdom) James Rossiter	(Japan) Lexus Team Petronas TOM'S	Lexus RC F GT500	Super GT Series	5:37:27.911
2015	(Japan) Daisuke Ito (United Kingdom) James Rossiter	(Japan) Lexus Team Petronas TOM'S	Lexus RC F GT500	Super GT Series	5:45:55.277; 163 laps, 946 km (Note: 2015 Race was stopped after 163 laps for reaching the time limit.)
2016	(Japan) Yuji Tachikawa (Japan) Hiroaki Ishiura	(Japan) Lexus Team ZENT Cerumo	Lexus RC F GT500	Super GT Series	5:45:34.230
2017	(Belgium) Bertrand Baguette (Japan) Kosuke Matsuura	(Japan) Epson Nakajima Racing	Honda NSX-GT GT500	Super GT Series	5:51:16.244; 171 laps, 993 km (Note: 2017 Race was stopped after 171 laps for reaching the time limit.)
10 hours duration, 5.807 km circuit
2018	(Germany) Maro Engel (Italy) Raffaele Marciello (France) Tristan Vautier	(Hong Kong) Mercedes-AMG Team GruppeM Racing	Mercedes-AMG GT3	Intercontinental GT Challenge	10:00:32.584; 276 laps, 1603 km
2019	(South Africa) Kelvin van der Linde (Belgium) Dries Vanthoor (Belgium) Frédéric Vervisch	(Belgium) Audi Sport Team WRT	Audi R8 LMS Evo	Intercontinental GT Challenge	10:01:51.048; 275 laps, 1597 km
2020 – 2024	Not held due to the influence of the COVID-19 pandemic				
6 hours 30 minutes duration, 5.807 km circuit
2025	(South Africa) Kelvin van der Linde (Switzerland) Raffaele Marciello (Belgium) Charles Weerts	(Belgium) Team WRT	BMW M4 GT3 Evo	Intercontinental GT Challenge	6:30:27.081; 170 laps, 987 km
2026	(Belgium) Alessio Picariello (Germany) Laurin Heinrich (France) Julien Andlauer	(United States) AO by Absolute Racing	Porsche 911 GT3 R (992.2)	Intercontinental GT Challenge	6:31:18.239; 184 laps, 1068 km

== Records ==
=== Multiple overall wins by driver ===
Wins	Driver	Years
4	(Japan) Kunimitsu Takahashi	1973, 1984, 1985, 1989
3	(Japan) Naoki Nagasaka	1980, 1982, 1991 (Note: Naoki Nagasaka was entered as part of the winning team in 1991 but did not drive during the race.)
3	(Japan) Ryo Michigami	1999, 2003, 2004
3	(Japan) Juichi Wakisaka	2000, 2002, 2007
3	(Japan) Daisuke Ito	2000, 2004, 2015
3	(France) Sébastien Philippe	2003, 2004, 2008
2	(Japan) Sachio Fukuzawa	1966, 1968
2	(Japan) Tomohiko Tsutsumi	1966, 1969
2	(Japan) Hiroshi Fushida	1968, 1971
2	(Japan) Jiro Yoneyama	1969, 1986 (Note: Jiro Yoneyama was entered as part of the 1986 winning team but did not drive during the race.)
2	(France) Bob Wollek	1981, 1994
2	(Japan) Kenji Takahashi	1984, 1985
2	(United Kingdom) Geoff Lees	1984, 1987
2	(Japan) Hideki Okada	1986, 1988
2	(Japan) Masanori Sekiya	1987, 1995
2	(Sweden) Stanley Dickens	1988, 1989
2	(Japan) Toshio Suzuki	1990, 1993
2	(United Kingdom) Ray Bellm	1995, 1996
2	(Germany) Bernd Schneider	1997, 1998
2	(Japan) Katsutomo Kaneishi	1999, 2000
2	(Japan) Shigekazu Wakisaka	2001, 2002
2	(Japan) Yuji Tachikawa	2001, 2016
2	(Italy) Ronnie Quintarelli	2005, 2012
2	(Japan) Hiroaki Ishiura	2009, 2016
2	(United Kingdom) James Rossiter	2014, 2015
2	(Switzerland) Raffaele Marciello	2018, 2025
2	(South Africa) Kelvin van der Linde	2019, 2025

=== Overall wins by manufacturer ===
Wins	Manufacturer	Years
12	(Germany) Porsche	1967, 1969, 1971, 1981, 1983, 1984, 1985, 1986, 1988, 1989, 1994, 2026
8	(Japan) Toyota	1966, 1968, 1972, 1987, 1991, 2001, 2002, 2005
8	(Japan) Honda	1999, 2000, 2003, 2004, 2010, 2011, 2013, 2017
7	(Japan) Nissan	1970, 1973, 1990, 1993, 2006, 2008, 2012
5	(Japan) Lexus	2007, 2009, 2014, 2015, 2016
3	(Germany) Mercedes-Benz	1997, 1998, 2018
2	(Germany) BMW	1982, 2025
2	(United Kingdom) McLaren	1995, 1996
1	(United Kingdom) March	1980
1	(France) Peugeot	1992
1	(Germany) Audi	2019

== Event names ==
- 1966–93, 2025–present: Suzuka 1000 km
- 1994–08: International Pokka 1000 km
- 2009–12: Pokka GT Summer Special
- 2013: International Pokka Sapporo 1000 km
- 2014–17: International Suzuka 1000 km
- 2018: Suzuka 10 Hours
- 2019: SMBC BH Auction Suzuka 10 Hours
