= 1997 Suzuka 1000 km =

1997 1000 km Suzuka

Seasons
- ← 1996 1998 →

Layout of the Suzuka International Racing Course (1987-2002)

The 1997 Pokka Suzuka 1000km was the seventh race of the 1997 FIA GT Championship season. It was run at the Suzuka Circuit, Japan on August 24, 1997.

Several Japanese teams chose to participate in this race, conforming to either the GT1 and GT2 classes.

== Official results ==
Class winners in bold. Cars failing to complete 75% of winner's distance marked as Not Classified (NC).

| Pos | Class | No | Team | Drivers | Chassis | Tyre | Laps |
| Pos | Class | No | Team | Drivers | Engine | Tyre | Laps |
|---|---|---|---|---|---|---|---|
| 1 | **GT1** | **10** | **(Germany) AMG-Mercedes** | **(Germany) Marcel Tiemann (Italy) Alessandro Nannini (Germany) Bernd Schneider‡** | **Mercedes-Benz CLK GTR** | **B** | **171** |
| 1 | **GT1** | **10** | **(Germany) AMG-Mercedes** | **(Germany) Marcel Tiemann (Italy) Alessandro Nannini (Germany) Bernd Schneider‡** | **Mercedes-Benz LS600 6.0L V12** | **B** | **171** |
| 2 | GT1 | 12 | (Germany) AMG-Mercedes | (Germany) Klaus Ludwig (Germany) Bernd Mayländer | Mercedes-Benz CLK GTR | **B** | 171 |
| 2 | GT1 | 12 | (Germany) AMG-Mercedes | (Germany) Klaus Ludwig (Germany) Bernd Mayländer | Mercedes-Benz LS600 6.0L V12 | **B** | 171 |
| 3 | GT1 | 3 | (United Kingdom) Gulf Team Davidoff (United Kingdom) GTC Racing | (Sweden) Anders Olofsson (France) Pierre-Henri Raphanel (France) Jean-Marc Gounon | McLaren F1 GTR | **M** | 171 |
| 3 | GT1 | 3 | (United Kingdom) Gulf Team Davidoff (United Kingdom) GTC Racing | (Sweden) Anders Olofsson (France) Pierre-Henri Raphanel (France) Jean-Marc Gounon | BMW S70 6.0L V12 | **M** | 171 |
| 4 | GT1 | 8 | (Germany) BMW Motorsport (Germany) Schnitzer Motorsport | (Finland) JJ Lehto (United Kingdom) Steve Soper | McLaren F1 GTR | **M** | 171 |
| 4 | GT1 | 8 | (Germany) BMW Motorsport (Germany) Schnitzer Motorsport | (Finland) JJ Lehto (United Kingdom) Steve Soper | BMW S70 6.0L V12 | **M** | 171 |
| 5 | GT1 | 6 | (Germany) Porsche AG | (France) Bob Wollek (Belgium) Thierry Boutsen (Germany) Hans-Joachim Stuck | Porsche 911 GT1 Evo | **M** | 169 |
| 5 | GT1 | 6 | (Germany) Porsche AG | (France) Bob Wollek (Belgium) Thierry Boutsen (Germany) Hans-Joachim Stuck | Porsche 3.2L Turbo Flat-6 | **M** | 169 |
| 6 | GT1 | 1 | (United Kingdom) Gulf Team Davidoff (United Kingdom) GTC Racing | (United Kingdom) Andrew Gilbert-Scott (United Kingdom) Geoff Lees (Denmark) John Nielsen | McLaren F1 GTR | **M** | 169 |
| 6 | GT1 | 1 | (United Kingdom) Gulf Team Davidoff (United Kingdom) GTC Racing | (United Kingdom) Andrew Gilbert-Scott (United Kingdom) Geoff Lees (Denmark) John Nielsen | BMW S70 6.0L V12 | **M** | 169 |
| 7 | GT1 | 11 | (Germany) AMG-Mercedes | (Germany) Bernd Schneider (Austria) Alexander Wurz (Japan) Aguri Suzuki | Mercedes-Benz CLK GTR | **B** | 169 |
| 7 | GT1 | 11 | (Germany) AMG-Mercedes | (Germany) Bernd Schneider (Austria) Alexander Wurz (Japan) Aguri Suzuki | Mercedes-Benz LS600 6.0L V12 | **B** | 169 |
| 8 | GT1 | 9 | (Germany) BMW Motorsport (Germany) Schnitzer Motorsport | (Netherlands) Peter Kox (Italy) Roberto Ravaglia | McLaren F1 GTR | **M** | 169 |
| 8 | GT1 | 9 | (Germany) BMW Motorsport (Germany) Schnitzer Motorsport | (Netherlands) Peter Kox (Italy) Roberto Ravaglia | BMW S70 6.0L V12 | **M** | 169 |
| 9 | GT1 | 44 | (Japan) Team Lark McLaren | (Japan) Keiichi Tsuchiya (Japan) Masanori Sekiya (Japan) Akihiko Nakaya | McLaren F1 GTR | **M** | 168 |
| 9 | GT1 | 44 | (Japan) Team Lark McLaren | (Japan) Keiichi Tsuchiya (Japan) Masanori Sekiya (Japan) Akihiko Nakaya | BMW S70 6.0L V12 | **M** | 168 |
| 10 | GT1 | 7 | (Germany) Porsche AG | (United Kingdom) Allan McNish (France) Yannick Dalmas (Portugal) Pedro Lamy | Porsche 911 GT1 Evo | **M** | 164 |
| 10 | GT1 | 7 | (Germany) Porsche AG | (United Kingdom) Allan McNish (France) Yannick Dalmas (Portugal) Pedro Lamy | Porsche 3.2L Turbo Flat-6 | **M** | 164 |
| 11 | GT1 | 17 | (France) JB Racing | (Italy) Mauro Baldi (France) Emmanuel Collard (France) Alain Ferté | Porsche 911 GT1 | **M** | 164 |
| 11 | GT1 | 17 | (France) JB Racing | (Italy) Mauro Baldi (France) Emmanuel Collard (France) Alain Ferté | Porsche 3.2L Turbo Flat-6 | **M** | 164 |
| 12 | GT1 | 5 | (United Kingdom) David Price Racing | (Australia) David Brabham (United Kingdom) Perry McCarthy (France) Olivier Grouillard | Panoz Esperante GTR-1 | **G** | 154 |
| 12 | GT1 | 5 | (United Kingdom) David Price Racing | (Australia) David Brabham (United Kingdom) Perry McCarthy (France) Olivier Grouillard | Ford (Roush) 6.0L V8 | **G** | 154 |
| 13 | GT1 | 16 | (Germany) Roock Racing | (Germany) Ralf Kelleners (France) Christophe Bouchut (Sweden) Carl Rosenblad | Porsche 911 GT1 | **M** | 159 |
| 13 | GT1 | 16 | (Germany) Roock Racing | (Germany) Ralf Kelleners (France) Christophe Bouchut (Sweden) Carl Rosenblad | Porsche 3.2L Turbo Flat-6 | **M** | 159 |
| 14 | **GT2** | **51** | **(France) Viper Team Oreca** | **(Monaco) Olivier Beretta (France) Philippe Gache** | **Chrysler Viper GTS-R** | **M** | **156** |
| 14 | **GT2** | **51** | **(France) Viper Team Oreca** | **(Monaco) Olivier Beretta (France) Philippe Gache** | **Chrysler 8.0L V10** | **M** | **156** |
| 15 | GT2 | 57 | (Germany) Roock Racing | (Portugal) Pedro Chaves (United Kingdom) Robert Nearn (Japan) Hisashi Wada | Porsche 911 GT2 | **M** | 155 |
| 15 | GT2 | 57 | (Germany) Roock Racing | (Portugal) Pedro Chaves (United Kingdom) Robert Nearn (Japan) Hisashi Wada | Porsche 3.6L Turbo Flat-6 | **M** | 155 |
| 16 | GT2 | 52 | (France) Viper Team Oreca | (United Kingdom) Justin Bell (United States) Tommy Archer (Japan) Hideshi Matsuda | Chrysler Viper GTS-R | **M** | 155 |
| 16 | GT2 | 52 | (France) Viper Team Oreca | (United Kingdom) Justin Bell (United States) Tommy Archer (Japan) Hideshi Matsuda | Chrysler 8.0L V10 | **M** | 155 |
| 17 | GT2 | 66 | (Germany) Konrad Motorsport | (Austria) Franz Konrad (Germany) Wolfgang Kaufmann (Japan) Seiichi Sodeyama | Porsche 911 GT2 | **P** | 153 |
| 17 | GT2 | 66 | (Germany) Konrad Motorsport | (Austria) Franz Konrad (Germany) Wolfgang Kaufmann (Japan) Seiichi Sodeyama | Porsche 3.6L Turbo Flat-6 | **P** | 153 |
| 18 | GT2 | 56 | (Germany) Roock Racing | (Switzerland) Bruno Eichmann (Portugal) Ni Amorim (Germany) Claudia Hürtgen | Porsche 911 GT2 | **M** | 153 |
| 18 | GT2 | 56 | (Germany) Roock Racing | (Switzerland) Bruno Eichmann (Portugal) Ni Amorim (Germany) Claudia Hürtgen | Porsche 3.6L Turbo Flat-6 | **M** | 153 |
| 19 | GT2 | 83 | (France) Larbre Compétition | (France) Patrice Goueslard (France) Jean-Luc Chereau (France) Jack Leconte | Porsche 911 GT2 | ? | 148 |
| 19 | GT2 | 83 | (France) Larbre Compétition | (France) Patrice Goueslard (France) Jean-Luc Chereau (France) Jack Leconte | Porsche 3.6L Turbo Flat-6 | ? | 148 |
| 20 | GT2 | 55 | (Austria) Augustin Motorsport | (Germany) Ernst Gschwender (Germany) Helmut Reis (Germany) Wido Rössler | Porsche 911 GT2 | **G** | 147 |
| 20 | GT2 | 55 | (Austria) Augustin Motorsport | (Germany) Ernst Gschwender (Germany) Helmut Reis (Germany) Wido Rössler | Porsche 3.6L Turbo Flat-6 | **G** | 147 |
| 21 | GT2 | 62 | (Switzerland) Stadler Motorsport | (Switzerland) Denis Lay (Switzerland) Uwe Sick (Switzerland) Franz Hunkeler | Porsche 911 GT2 | **P** | 145 |
| 21 | GT2 | 62 | (Switzerland) Stadler Motorsport | (Switzerland) Denis Lay (Switzerland) Uwe Sick (Switzerland) Franz Hunkeler | Porsche 3.6L Turbo Flat-6 | **P** | 145 |
| 22 | GT2 | 58 | (France) Estoril Racing Team | (France) Michel Monteiro (Portugal) Manuel Monteiro (Switzerland) Henri-Louis Maunoir | Porsche 911 GT2 | ? | 140 |
| 22 | GT2 | 58 | (France) Estoril Racing Team | (France) Michel Monteiro (Portugal) Manuel Monteiro (Switzerland) Henri-Louis Maunoir | Porsche 3.6L Turbo Flat-6 | ? | 140 |
| 23 | GT2 | 59 | (Netherlands) Marcos Racing International | (Netherlands) Cor Euser (Germany) Harald Becker (Netherlands) Herman Buurman | Marcos LM600 | **D** | 138 |
| 23 | GT2 | 59 | (Netherlands) Marcos Racing International | (Netherlands) Cor Euser (Germany) Harald Becker (Netherlands) Herman Buurman | Chevrolet 5.9L V8 | **D** | 138 |
| 24 | GT2 | 63 | (Germany) Krauss Motorsport | (Japan) Takashi Suzuki (Japan) Sumio Sakurai (United Kingdom) Nigel Smith | Porsche 911 GT2 | **P** | 130 |
| 24 | GT2 | 63 | (Germany) Krauss Motorsport | (Japan) Takashi Suzuki (Japan) Sumio Sakurai (United Kingdom) Nigel Smith | Porsche 3.6L Turbo Flat-6 | **P** | 130 |
| 25 | GT2 | 53 | (United Kingdom) Chamberlain Engineering | (Japan) Manabu Orido (Japan) Naohiro Kawano (Japan) Yukihiro Hane | Chrysler Viper GTS-R | **G** | 84 |
| 25 | GT2 | 53 | (United Kingdom) Chamberlain Engineering | (Japan) Manabu Orido (Japan) Naohiro Kawano (Japan) Yukihiro Hane | Chrysler 8.0L V10 | **G** | 84 |
| 26 NC | GT2 | 84 | (Japan) NSX Dream 28 Competition | (Japan) Hajime Ooshiro (Japan) Masayoshi Furuya (Japan) Shigekazu Saeki | Honda NSX | ? | 45 |
| 26 NC | GT2 | 84 | (Japan) NSX Dream 28 Competition | (Japan) Hajime Ooshiro (Japan) Masayoshi Furuya (Japan) Shigekazu Saeki | Honda 3.2L V6 | ? | 45 |
| 27 DNF | GT1 | 4 | (United Kingdom) David Price Racing | (United Kingdom) Andy Wallace (United Kingdom) James Weaver (United States) Butch Leitzinger | Panoz Esperante GTR-1 | **G** | 110 |
| 27 DNF | GT1 | 4 | (United Kingdom) David Price Racing | (United Kingdom) Andy Wallace (United Kingdom) James Weaver (United States) Butch Leitzinger | Ford (Roush) 6.0L V8 | **G** | 110 |
| 28 DNF | GT2 | 50 | (United Kingdom) Agusta Racing Team (Switzerland) Elf Haberthur Racing | (Italy) Luca Drudi (France) Michel Ligonnet (Japan) Masahiro Kimoto | Porsche 911 GT2 | ? | 86 |
| 28 DNF | GT2 | 50 | (United Kingdom) Agusta Racing Team (Switzerland) Elf Haberthur Racing | (Italy) Luca Drudi (France) Michel Ligonnet (Japan) Masahiro Kimoto | Porsche 3.6L Turbo Flat-6 | ? | 86 |
| 29 DNF | GT1 | 46 | (Japan) Team Menicon SARD | (Japan) Masami Kageyama (Japan) Tetsuya Tanaka | SARD MC8-R | **D** | 71 |
| 29 DNF | GT1 | 46 | (Japan) Team Menicon SARD | (Japan) Masami Kageyama (Japan) Tetsuya Tanaka | Toyota 1UZ-FE 4.0L Turbo V8 | **D** | 71 |
| 30 DNF | GT1 | 27 | (United Kingdom) Parabolica Motorsport | (United Kingdom) Gary Ayles (United Kingdom) Chris Goodwin (Sweden) Stefan Johansson | McLaren F1 GTR | **M** | 65 |
| 30 DNF | GT1 | 27 | (United Kingdom) Parabolica Motorsport | (United Kingdom) Gary Ayles (United Kingdom) Chris Goodwin (Sweden) Stefan Johansson | BMW S70 6.0L V12 | **M** | 65 |
| 31 DNF | GT2 | 69 | (Germany) Proton Competition | (Germany) Gerold Ried (France) Patrick Vuillaume (Austria) Manfred Jurasz | Porsche 911 GT2 | **P** | 59 |
| 31 DNF | GT2 | 69 | (Germany) Proton Competition | (Germany) Gerold Ried (France) Patrick Vuillaume (Austria) Manfred Jurasz | Porsche 3.6L Turbo Flat-6 | **P** | 59 |
| 32 DNF | GT1 | 20 | (France) DAMS Panoz | (France) Éric Bernard (France) Franck Lagorce | Panoz Esperante GTR-1 | **M** | 26 |
| 32 DNF | GT1 | 20 | (France) DAMS Panoz | (France) Éric Bernard (France) Franck Lagorce | Ford (Roush) 6.0L V8 | **M** | 26 |
| 33 DNF | GT1 | 25 | (France) BBA Compétition | (France) Jean-Luc Maury-Laribière (Japan) Jun Harada (Japan) Tomiko Yoshikawa | McLaren F1 GTR | **D** | 18 |
| 33 DNF | GT1 | 25 | (France) BBA Compétition | (France) Jean-Luc Maury-Laribière (Japan) Jun Harada (Japan) Tomiko Yoshikawa | BMW S70 6.1L V12 | **D** | 18 |
| 34 DNF | GT1 | 15 | (France) First Racing Project (United Kingdom) GT1 Lotus Racing | (Thailand) Ratanakul Prutirat (France) Fabien Giroix (France) Jérôme Policand | Lotus Elise GT1 | **P** | 15 |
| 34 DNF | GT1 | 15 | (France) First Racing Project (United Kingdom) GT1 Lotus Racing | (Thailand) Ratanakul Prutirat (France) Fabien Giroix (France) Jérôme Policand | Chevrolet LT5 6.0L V8 | **P** | 15 |
| 35 DNF | GT2 | 85 | (Japan) Team Signal | (Japan) Takeshi Yuasa (Japan) Kiyoaki Hanai (Japan) Akio Tomita | Nissan Silvia | ? | 2 |
| 35 DNF | GT2 | 85 | (Japan) Team Signal | (Japan) Takeshi Yuasa (Japan) Kiyoaki Hanai (Japan) Akio Tomita | Nissan SR20DET 2.0L Turbo I4 | ? | 2 |
| 36 DNF | GT1 | 39 | (Japan) IDC Ootsukakagu SARD | (Japan) Tatsuya Tanigawa (Japan) Yuji Tachikawa (Japan) Yasutaka Hinoi | SARD MC8-R | **Y** | 0 |
| 36 DNF | GT1 | 39 | (Japan) IDC Ootsukakagu SARD | (Japan) Tatsuya Tanigawa (Japan) Yuji Tachikawa (Japan) Yasutaka Hinoi | Toyota 1UZ-FE 4.0L Turbo V8 | **Y** | 0 |
| DNS | GT1 | 2 | (United Kingdom) Gulf Team Davidoff (United Kingdom) GTC Racing | (Denmark) John Nielsen (Germany) Thomas Bscher | McLaren F1 GTR | **M** | – |
| DNS | GT1 | 2 | (United Kingdom) Gulf Team Davidoff (United Kingdom) GTC Racing | (Denmark) John Nielsen (Germany) Thomas Bscher | BMW S70 6.0L V12 | **M** | – |

‡ – Scored points despite not being entered in that car

== Statistics ==
- Pole Position – #12 AMG-Mercedes – 1:56.023
- Fastest Lap – #12 AMG-Mercedes – 2:00.019
- Average Speed – 167.340 km/h

FIA GT Championship
| Previous race: 1997 FIA GT Zeltweg 4 Hours | 1997 season | Next race: 1997 FIA GT Donington 4 Hours |
