= Lampell =

Lampell is a surname. Notable people with the surname include:

- Millard Lampell (1919–1997), American screenwriter
- Sven Lampell (1920–2007), Swedish Air Force officer

== See also ==
- Lampela
- Lamprell
