= Kaukonen =

Kaukonen is a surname. Notable people with the surname include:

- Amy Kaukonen (1891–1984), American doctor and politician
- Jorma Kaukonen (born 1940), American guitarist
- Lauri Kaukonen (1902–1975), Finnish business leader
- Peter Kaukonen (born 1945), American guitarist/multi-instrumentalist/songwriter
