= 1996 1000 km of Suzuka =

1996 1000 km Suzuka

Seasons
- ← 1995 1997 →

The 1996 1000 km of Suzuka was the seventh round of the 1996 BPR Global GT Series season. It was run at the Suzuka Circuit on 25 August 1996.

== Official results ==
Layout of the Suzuka Circuit

Class winners in bold. Cars failing to complete 75% of winner's distance marked as Not Classified (NC).

Pos	Class	No	Team	Drivers	Chassis	Tyre	Laps
Pos	Class	No	Team	Drivers	Engine	Tyre	Laps
1	**GT1**	**2**	**(United Kingdom) Gulf Racing** **(United Kingdom) GTC Competition**	**(United Kingdom) James Weaver** **(United Kingdom) Ray Bellm** **(Finland) JJ Lehto**	**McLaren F1 GTR**	**M**	**171**
1	**GT1**	**2**	**(United Kingdom) Gulf Racing** **(United Kingdom) GTC Competition**	**(United Kingdom) James Weaver** **(United Kingdom) Ray Bellm** **(Finland) JJ Lehto**	**BMW S70 6.1 L V12**	**M**	**171**
2	GT1	27	(Italy) Ennea Igol	(Sweden) Anders Olofsson (Italy) Luciano della Noce	Ferrari F40 GTE	**P**	170
2	GT1	27	(Italy) Ennea Igol	(Sweden) Anders Olofsson (Italy) Luciano della Noce	Ferrari F120B 3.5 L Turbo V8	**P**	170
3	GT1	3	(United Kingdom) Harrods Mach One Racing	(France) Olivier Grouillard (United Kingdom) Andy Wallace	McLaren F1 GTR	**G**	169
3	GT1	3	(United Kingdom) Harrods Mach One Racing	(France) Olivier Grouillard (United Kingdom) Andy Wallace	BMW S70 6.1 L V12	**G**	169
4	GT1	1	(United Kingdom) West Competition (United Kingdom) David Price Racing	(Denmark) John Nielsen (Germany) Thomas Bscher	McLaren F1 GTR	**G**	168
4	GT1	1	(United Kingdom) West Competition (United Kingdom) David Price Racing	(Denmark) John Nielsen (Germany) Thomas Bscher	BMW S70 6.1 L V12	**G**	168
5	GT1	9	(France) Franck Muller Watch	(France) Fabien Giroix (Switzerland) Jean-Denis Délétraz (Thailand) Ratanakul Prutirat	McLaren F1 GTR	**M**	167
5	GT1	9	(France) Franck Muller Watch	(France) Fabien Giroix (Switzerland) Jean-Denis Délétraz (Thailand) Ratanakul Prutirat	BMW S70 6.1 L V12	**M**	167
6	GT1	6	(United Kingdom) Gulf Racing (United Kingdom) GTC Competition	(France) Pierre-Henri Raphanel (Australia) David Brabham (United Kingdom) Lindsay Owen-Jones	McLaren F1 GTR	**M**	167
6	GT1	6	(United Kingdom) Gulf Racing (United Kingdom) GTC Competition	(France) Pierre-Henri Raphanel (Australia) David Brabham (United Kingdom) Lindsay Owen-Jones	BMW S70 6.1 L V12	**M**	167
7	GT1	28	(Italy) Ennea Igol	(France) Jean-Marc Gounon (France) Éric Bernard (France) Paul Belmondo	Ferrari F40 GTE	**P**	167
7	GT1	28	(Italy) Ennea Igol	(France) Jean-Marc Gounon (France) Éric Bernard (France) Paul Belmondo	Ferrari F120B 3.5 L Turbo V8	**P**	167
8	**GT2**	**56**	**(Germany) Roock Racing**	**(Germany) Gerd Ruch** **(Switzerland) Bruno Eichmann** **(Germany) Ralf Kelleners**	**Porsche 911 GT2**	**M**	**164**
8	**GT2**	**56**	**(Germany) Roock Racing**	**(Germany) Gerd Ruch** **(Switzerland) Bruno Eichmann** **(Germany) Ralf Kelleners**	**Porsche 3.6 L Turbo Flat-6**	**M**	**164**
9	GT2	88	(Austria) Konrad Motorsport	(France) Bob Wollek (Austria) Franz Konrad	Porsche 911 GT2	**M**	164
9	GT2	88	(Austria) Konrad Motorsport	(France) Bob Wollek (Austria) Franz Konrad	Porsche 3.6 L Turbo Flat-6	**M**	164
10	GT2	83	(Netherlands) Marcos Racing International	(Netherlands) Cor Euser (Japan) Hisashi Wada (Japan) Naohiro Furuya	Marcos LM600	**D**	162
10	GT2	83	(Netherlands) Marcos Racing International	(Netherlands) Cor Euser (Japan) Hisashi Wada (Japan) Naohiro Furuya	Chevrolet 6.0 L V8	**D**	162
11	GT1	32	(France) Viper Team Oreca	(Monaco) Olivier Beretta (France) Philippe Gache (France) Eric Hélary	Chrysler Viper GTS-R	**M**	162
11	GT1	32	(France) Viper Team Oreca	(Monaco) Olivier Beretta (France) Philippe Gache (France) Eric Hélary	Chrysler 356-T6 8.0 L V10	**M**	162
12	GT2	55	(Switzerland) Stadler Motorsport	(Switzerland) Lilian Bryner (Switzerland) Enzo Calderari (Germany) Ulli Richter	Porsche 911 GT2	**P**	160
12	GT2	55	(Switzerland) Stadler Motorsport	(Switzerland) Lilian Bryner (Switzerland) Enzo Calderari (Germany) Ulli Richter	Porsche 3.6 L Turbo Flat-6	**P**	160
13	GT2	65	(Germany) Roock Racing	(Japan) Tomiko Yoshikawa (France) Guy Martinolle (France) Jean-Claude Lagniez	Porsche 911 GT2	**M**	156
13	GT2	65	(Germany) Roock Racing	(Japan) Tomiko Yoshikawa (France) Guy Martinolle (France) Jean-Claude Lagniez	Porsche 3.6 L Turbo Flat-6	**M**	156
14	GT2	99	(Switzerland) Elf Haberthur Racing	(France) Stéphane Ratel (France) Michel Ligonnet (Japan) Masahiro Kimoto	Porsche 911 GT2	**P**	155
14	GT2	99	(Switzerland) Elf Haberthur Racing	(France) Stéphane Ratel (France) Michel Ligonnet (Japan) Masahiro Kimoto	Porsche 3.6 L Turbo Flat-6	**P**	155
15	**Nat. GT**	**31**	**(Japan) Cobra Racing Team**	**(Japan) Katsunori Iketani** **(Japan) Katsuo Kobayashi** **(Japan) Masamitsu Ishihara**	**Porsche 911 RS**	?	**154**
15	**Nat. GT**	**31**	**(Japan) Cobra Racing Team**	**(Japan) Katsunori Iketani** **(Japan) Katsuo Kobayashi** **(Japan) Masamitsu Ishihara**	**Porsche 3.6 L Flat-6**	?	**154**
16	Nat. GT	910	(Japan) 910 Racing	(Japan) Seiichi Sodeyama (Japan) Kiyoshi Misaki (Japan) Kouzaburou Takahashi	Porsche 993 Carrera	?	154
16	Nat. GT	910	(Japan) 910 Racing	(Japan) Seiichi Sodeyama (Japan) Kiyoshi Misaki (Japan) Kouzaburou Takahashi	Porsche 3.6 L Flat-6	?	154
17	Nat. GT	12	(Japan) Schloss Motorsport	(Japan) Katsuhiko Okamoto (Japan) Katsuya Makita	Porsche 993 Cup	?	154
17	Nat. GT	12	(Japan) Schloss Motorsport	(Japan) Katsuhiko Okamoto (Japan) Katsuya Makita	Porsche 3.6 L Flat-6	?	154
18	GT2	51	(Germany) Proton Competition	(Germany) Gerold Ried (France) Patrick Vuillaume (France) Christian Pellieux	Porsche 911 GT2	**P**	154
18	GT2	51	(Germany) Proton Competition	(Germany) Gerold Ried (France) Patrick Vuillaume (France) Christian Pellieux	Porsche 3.6 L Turbo Flat-6	**P**	154
19	GT2	77	(Germany) Seikel Motorsport	(Austria) Manfred Jurasz (Italy) Giuseppe Quargentan (Japan) Takashi Suzuki	Porsche 911 GT2	**P**	153
19	GT2	77	(Germany) Seikel Motorsport	(Austria) Manfred Jurasz (Italy) Giuseppe Quargentan (Japan) Takashi Suzuki	Porsche 3.6 L Turbo Flat-6	**P**	153
20	Nat. GT	41	(Japan) Aiwa Racing Project	(Japan) Akira Ishikawa (Japan) Tetsuya Tanaka (Japan) Hideaki Hagiwara	Porsche 964 Carrera	?	153
20	Nat. GT	41	(Japan) Aiwa Racing Project	(Japan) Akira Ishikawa (Japan) Tetsuya Tanaka (Japan) Hideaki Hagiwara	Porsche 3.6 L Flat-6	?	153
21	GT2	911	(Japan) Keep The Dream Alive Racing Team	(Japan) Kenji Kawagoe (Japan) Syunji Kasuya (Hong Kong) Keith Wong	Porsche 911 GT2	**D**	152
21	GT2	911	(Japan) Keep The Dream Alive Racing Team	(Japan) Kenji Kawagoe (Japan) Syunji Kasuya (Hong Kong) Keith Wong	Porsche 3.6 L Turbo Flat-6	**D**	152
22	GT2	96	(France) Larbre Compétition	(France) Patrice Goueslard (Germany) André Ahrlé (France) Jean-Luc Chéreau	Porsche 911 GT2	**M**	152
22	GT2	96	(France) Larbre Compétition	(France) Patrice Goueslard (Germany) André Ahrlé (France) Jean-Luc Chéreau	Porsche 3.6 L Turbo Flat-6	**M**	152
23	Nat. GT	10	(Japan) Southeast Motorsport	(Japan) Yukihiro Hane (Japan) Yoshifumi Matsunami (Japan) Katsuji Shiomi	Porsche 993 Carrera	?	151
23	Nat. GT	10	(Japan) Southeast Motorsport	(Japan) Yukihiro Hane (Japan) Yoshifumi Matsunami (Japan) Katsuji Shiomi	Porsche 3.6 L Flat-6	?	151
24	GT1	29	(Italy) Ennea/Ferrari Club Italia	(Italy) Max Angelelli (Japan) Tetsuya Ota	Ferrari F40 GTE	**P**	151
24	GT1	29	(Italy) Ennea/Ferrari Club Italia	(Italy) Max Angelelli (Japan) Tetsuya Ota	Ferrari F120B 3.5 L Turbo V8	**P**	151
25	GT2	16	(Japan) Prova Motorsport	(Japan) Tetsuhumi Toda (Japan) Akio Tomita (Japan) Eiji Yamada	Porsche 911 GT2	**D**	151
25	GT2	16	(Japan) Prova Motorsport	(Japan) Tetsuhumi Toda (Japan) Akio Tomita (Japan) Eiji Yamada	Porsche 3.6 L Turbo Flat-6	**D**	151
26	GT1	5	(France) Graham	(France) Éric Graham (France) Michel Faraut	Venturi 600LM	**D**	150
26	GT1	5	(France) Graham	(France) Éric Graham (France) Michel Faraut	Renault PRV 3.0 L Turbo V6	**D**	150
27	Nat. GT	70	(Japan) Ishibashi Yoshimi	(Japan) Yoshimi Ishibashi (Japan) Kaoru Hoshino (Japan) Hiroyuki Nodi	Porsche 911 RS	?	148
27	Nat. GT	70	(Japan) Ishibashi Yoshimi	(Japan) Yoshimi Ishibashi (Japan) Kaoru Hoshino (Japan) Hiroyuki Nodi	Porsche 3.6 L Flat-6	?	148
28	GT1	188	(Japan) Ken Wolf with JLOC Corsa	(Japan) Takao Wada (Japan) Hideo Fukuyama (Italy) Luigi Moccia	Lamborghini Diablo Jota	?	144
28	GT1	188	(Japan) Ken Wolf with JLOC Corsa	(Japan) Takao Wada (Japan) Hideo Fukuyama (Italy) Luigi Moccia	Lamborghini 5.5 L V12	?	144
29	Nat. GT	17	(Japan) Kageisen Racing Team	(Japan) Toshihiko Nogami (Japan) Toshiaki Koshimizu (Japan) Tomoyuki Hosono	Mazda RX-7	?	140
29	Nat. GT	17	(Japan) Kageisen Racing Team	(Japan) Toshihiko Nogami (Japan) Toshiaki Koshimizu (Japan) Tomoyuki Hosono	Mazda 13B 1.3 L 3-Rotor	?	140
30	Nat. GT	101	NSX Club Of Japan	(Japan) Hajime Ooshiro (Japan) Naohiro Furuya (Japan) Shigekazu Saeki	Honda NSX-R	?	137
30	Nat. GT	101	NSX Club Of Japan	(Japan) Hajime Ooshiro (Japan) Naohiro Furuya (Japan) Shigekazu Saeki	Honda C30A 3.0 L V6	?	137
DNF	GT2	74	(Switzerland) Callaway Schweiz	(Switzerland) Kurt Huber (Switzerland) Hans Hauser (Switzerland) Andrea Chiesa	Callaway Corvette LM600	**Y**	140
DNF	GT2	74	(Switzerland) Callaway Schweiz	(Switzerland) Kurt Huber (Switzerland) Hans Hauser (Switzerland) Andrea Chiesa	Chevrolet 6.2 L V8	**Y**	140
DNF	GT2	64	(United Kingdom) Lanzante Motorsport	(United States) Andy Pilgrim (Germany) Claudia Hürtgen (France) Michel Ligonnet	Porsche 911 GT2	**M**	112
DNF	GT2	64	(United Kingdom) Lanzante Motorsport	(United States) Andy Pilgrim (Germany) Claudia Hürtgen (France) Michel Ligonnet	Porsche 3.6 L Turbo Flat-6	**M**	112
DNF	GT1	49	(Germany) Freisinger Motorsport	(Germany) Wolfgang Kaufmann (Belgium) Thierry Boutsen	Porsche 911 GT2 Evo	**G**	102
DNF	GT1	49	(Germany) Freisinger Motorsport	(Germany) Wolfgang Kaufmann (Belgium) Thierry Boutsen	Porsche 3.6 L Turbo Flat-6	**G**	102
DNF	GT1	48	(Japan) Team BMB Mini Juke	(Japan) Yasutaka Hinoi (Japan) Yukio Okamoto	Porsche 911 GT2 Evo	?	98
DNF	GT1	48	(Japan) Team BMB Mini Juke	(Japan) Yasutaka Hinoi (Japan) Yukio Okamoto	Porsche 3.6 L Turbo Flat-6	?	98
DNF	GT2	100	(Japan) Team Kunimitsu	(Japan) Kunimitsu Takahashi (Japan) Keiichi Tsuchiya (Japan) Ryo Michigami	Honda NSX	**Y**	90
DNF	GT2	100	(Japan) Team Kunimitsu	(Japan) Kunimitsu Takahashi (Japan) Keiichi Tsuchiya (Japan) Ryo Michigami	Honda C30A 3.0 L V6	**Y**	90
DNF	Nat. GT	33	(Japan) Puma Racing Team	(Japan) Akihiko Nakaya (Japan) Takahiko Hara	Mitsubishi GTO	?	89
DNF	Nat. GT	33	(Japan) Puma Racing Team	(Japan) Akihiko Nakaya (Japan) Takahiko Hara	Mitsubishi 6G72 3.0 L V6	?	89
DNF	GT1	26	(United Kingdom) Lister Storm	(United Kingdom) Tiff Needell (United Kingdom) Geoff Lees (France) Christophe Bouchut	Lister Storm GTS	**M**	82
DNF	GT1	26	(United Kingdom) Lister Storm	(United Kingdom) Tiff Needell (United Kingdom) Geoff Lees (France) Christophe Bouchut	Jaguar 7.0 L V12	**M**	82
DNF	GT2	57	(Germany) Freisinger Motorsport	(Japan) Yukihiro Hane (France) Emmanuel Clérico	Porsche 911 GT2 Evo	**G**	81
DNF	GT2	57	(Germany) Freisinger Motorsport	(Japan) Yukihiro Hane (France) Emmanuel Clérico	Porsche 3.6 L Turbo Flat-6	**G**	81
DNF	GT1	40	(France) Pilot Racing	(France) Michel Ferté (France) Olivier Thévenin	Ferrari F40 LM	**M**	62
DNF	GT1	40	(France) Pilot Racing	(France) Michel Ferté (France) Olivier Thévenin	Ferrari F120B 3.0 L Turbo V8	**M**	62
DNF	GT2	30	(Japan) Team Nicos	(Japan) Youji Yamada (Japan) Eiichi Tajima (Japan) Kazuo Mogi	Porsche 911 GT2	**B**	45
DNF	GT2	30	(Japan) Team Nicos	(Japan) Youji Yamada (Japan) Eiichi Tajima (Japan) Kazuo Mogi	Porsche 3.6 L Turbo Flat-6	**B**	45
DNF	GT1	8	(France) BBA Compétition	(France) Jean-Luc Maury-Laribière (Belgium) Jean-Paul Libert (France) Emmanuel Clérico	McLaren F1 GTR	**D**	28
DNF	GT1	8	(France) BBA Compétition	(France) Jean-Luc Maury-Laribière (Belgium) Jean-Paul Libert (France) Emmanuel Clérico	BMW S70 6.1 L V12	**D**	28
DNF	GT1	11	(Germany) Konrad Motorsport	(Austria) Franz Konrad (United Kingdom) Robert Nearn (Japan) Taki Inoue	Porsche 911 GT2 Evo	**M**	18
DNF	GT1	11	(Germany) Konrad Motorsport	(Austria) Franz Konrad (United Kingdom) Robert Nearn (Japan) Taki Inoue	Porsche 3.6 L Turbo Flat-6	**M**	18
DNF	GT2	164	(Japan) Nakajima Honda	(Japan) Takuya Kurosawa (Japan) Kouji Satou (Japan) Toranosuke Takagi	Honda NSX	**B**	8
DNF	GT2	164	(Japan) Nakajima Honda	(Japan) Takuya Kurosawa (Japan) Kouji Satou (Japan) Toranosuke Takagi	Honda C30A 3.0 L V6	**B**	8
DNF	GT1	46	(Japan) Team Menicon SARD	(France) Alain Ferté (Italy) Mauro Martini (Japan) Naoki Nagasaka	SARD MC8-R	?	6
DNF	GT1	46	(Japan) Team Menicon SARD	(France) Alain Ferté (Italy) Mauro Martini (Japan) Naoki Nagasaka	Toyota 1UZ-FE 4.0 L Turbo V8	?	6
DNF	GT1	21	(United Kingdom) Lotus Racing Team	(United Kingdom) Alex Portman (Netherlands) Jan Lammers (Netherlands) Mike Hezemans	Lotus Esprit GT1	**M**	5
DNF	GT1	21	(United Kingdom) Lotus Racing Team	(United Kingdom) Alex Portman (Netherlands) Jan Lammers (Netherlands) Mike Hezemans	Lotus Type-918 3.5 L Turbo V8	**M**	5

== Statistics ==
- Pole Position - (Finland) JJ Lehto (#2 Gulf Racing/GTC Competition) - 2:02.502
- Fastest Lap - (France) Jean-Marc Gounon (#28 Ennea Igol) - 2:03.684

BPR Global GT Series
Previous race: Anderstorp	1996 season	Next race: Brands Hatch
