= Lampela =

Surname list

Lampela is a surname. Notable people with the surname include:

- Jarmo Lampela (born 1964), Finnish film director and screenwriter
- Seppo Lampela (born 1976), Finnish rap musician

== See also ==
- Lamela (surname)
- Lampell
