= Kevo Strict Nature Reserve =

Strict nature reserve in Utsjoki, Finland

- IUCN category Ia (strict nature reserve)
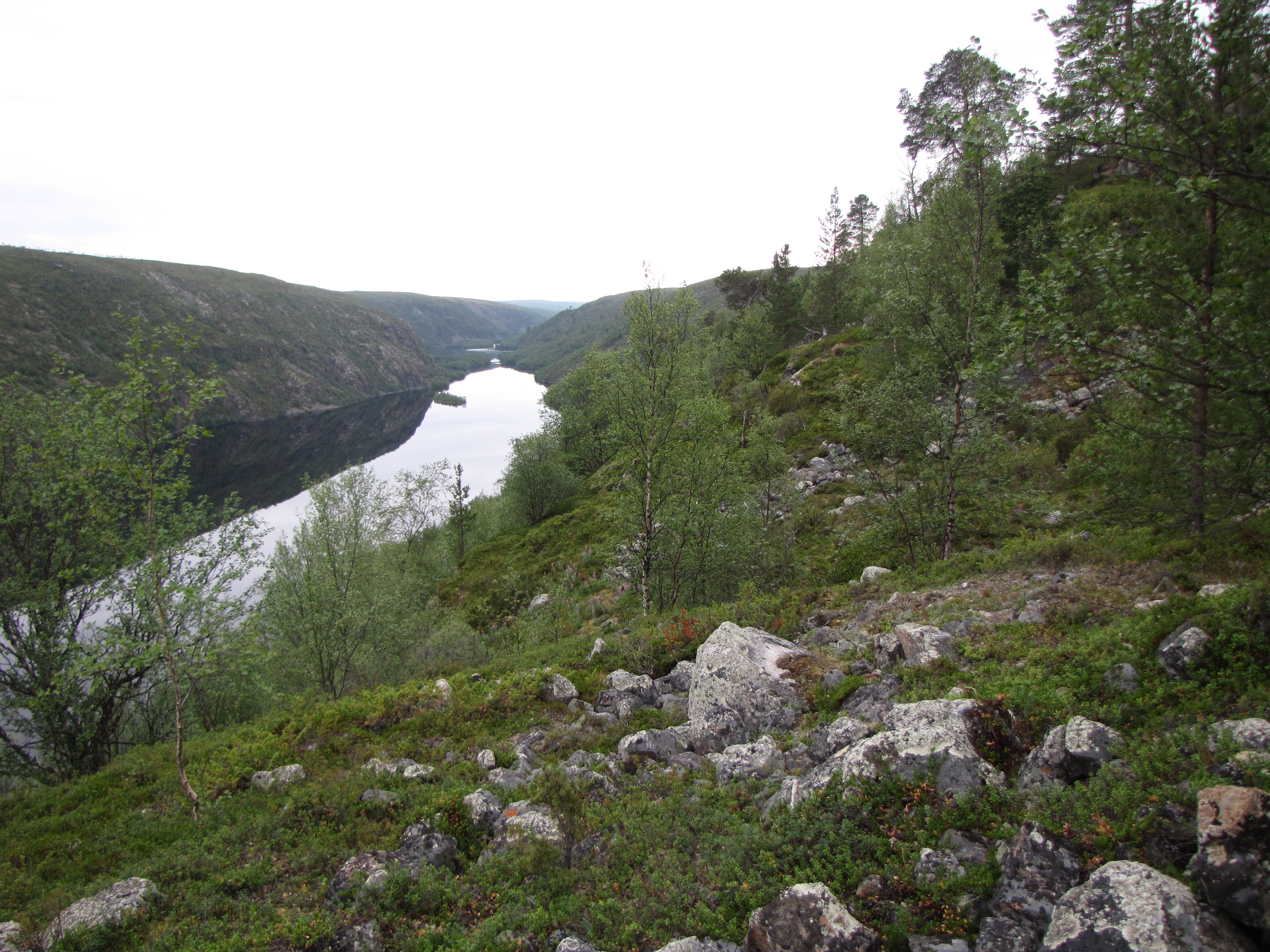

- Location within Finland
- Location: Utsjoki, Finland
- Coordinates: 69°34′51″N 026°42′56″E
- Area: 712 km^{2} (275 sq mi)
- Established: 1956
- Governing body: Metsähallitus
- Website: www.nationalparks.fi/kevo

Kevo Strict Nature Reserve (Finnish: Kevon luonnonpuisto, Northern Sami: Geavu luonddumeahcci) is a strict nature reserve located in Utsjoki, northern Lapland, Finland. It was established in 1956 and covers 712 square kilometres (275 mi^{2}).

The reserve is a popular backpacking destination due to its canyon-like gorge valley. A central part of the reserve is the 40 kilometres (25 mi) long and, at places, 80 metres (260 ft) deep Kevojoki canyon, on the bottom of which flows the Kevojoki river. It is surrounded by more level fell upland.

Walking in the reserve is only permitted along two marked routes. The Kevo backpacking route is 64 kilometres (40 mi) long and follows the gorge valley. The Kuivi route is 78 kilometres (48 mi) and goes along the fell area. Both routes are difficult and include e.g. many paddle crossings.

== Gallery ==
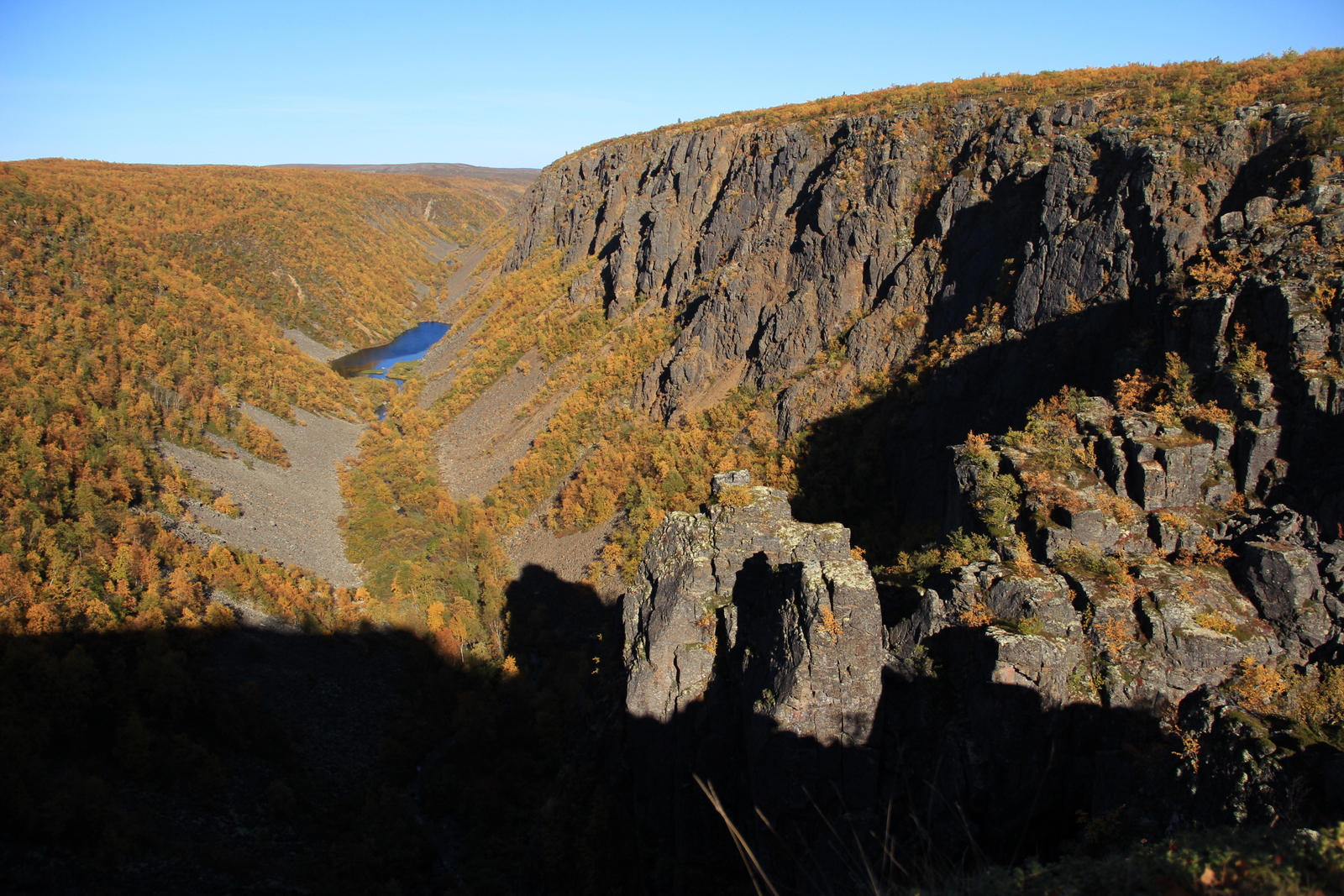
Kevo Canyon

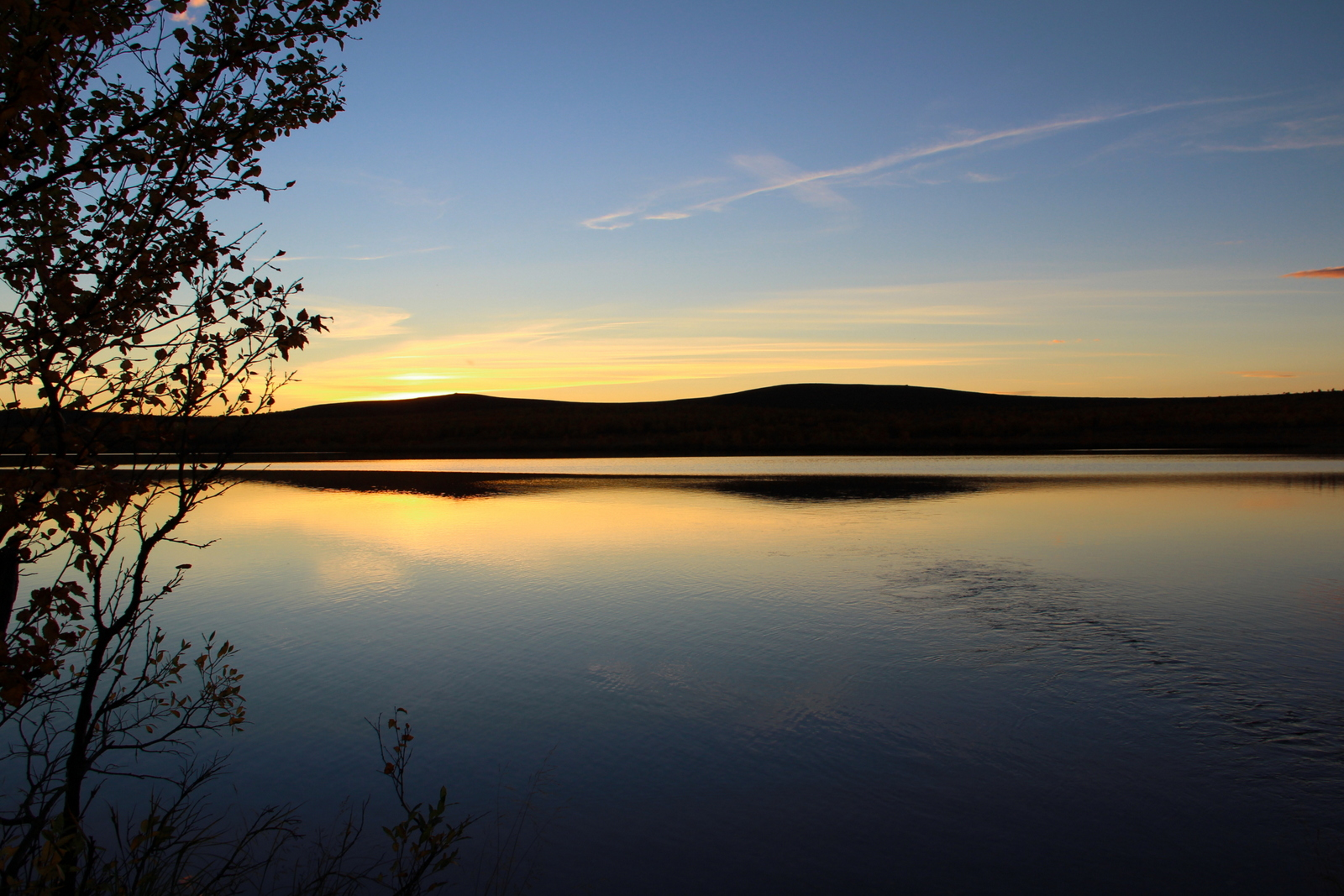
Sunset at Kevo Strict Nature Reserve

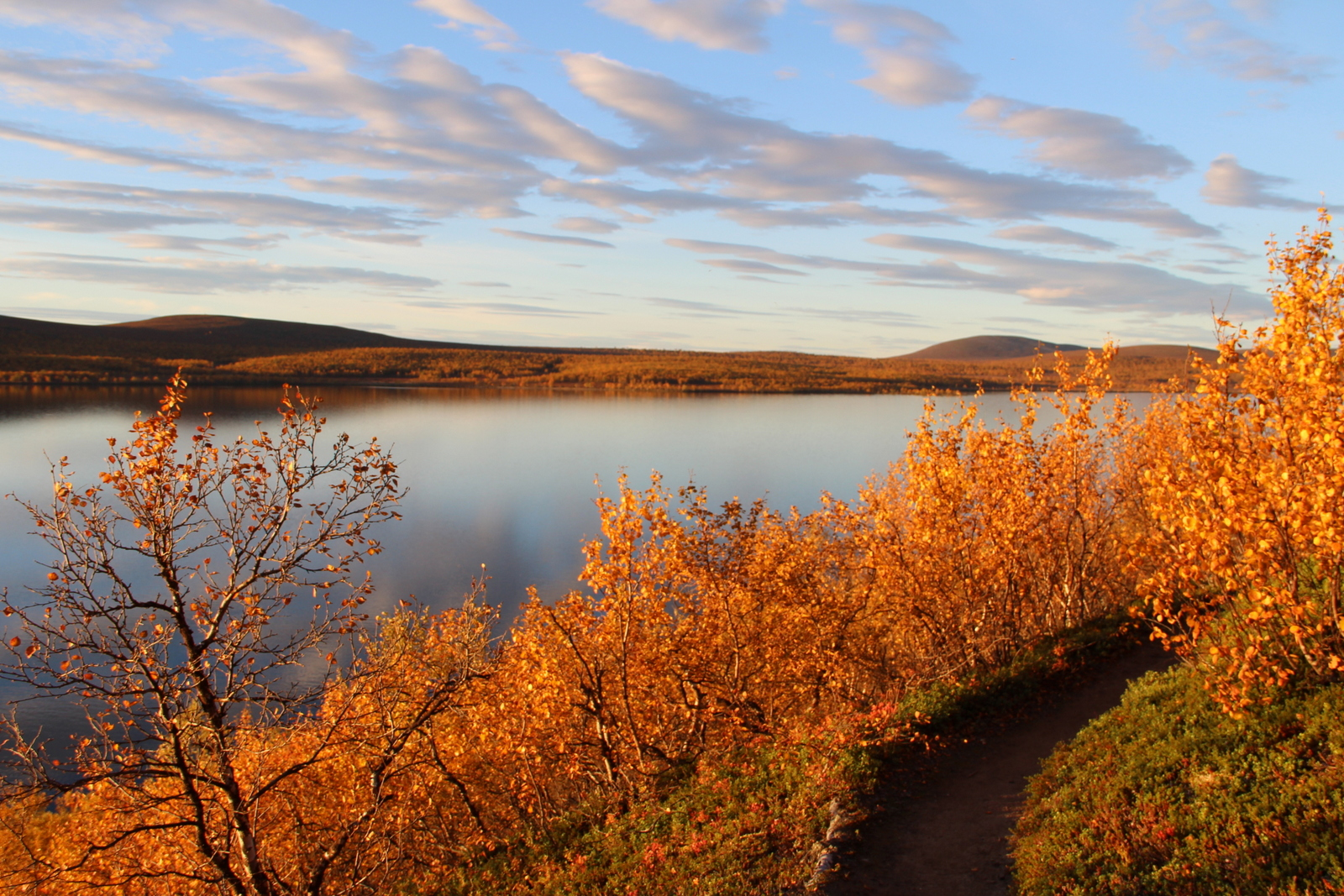
Autumn foliage at Kevo Strict Nature Reserve
