= Amy Kaukonen =

American physician (1891–1984)

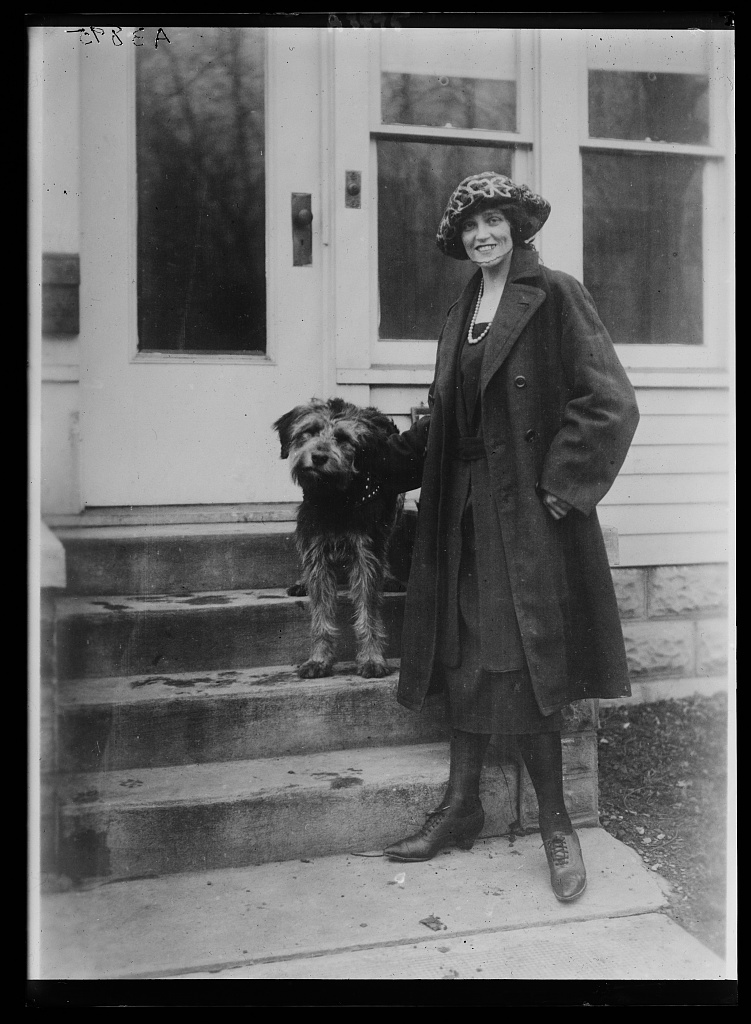

Mayor of Fairport Harbor, Ohio
- In office 1922–1923

Personal details
- Born: 1891 Lorain, Ohio
- Died: 1984 (aged 92–93) Painesville, Ohio
- Occupation: physician

Amy Agnes Kaukonen (1891–1984) was an American medical doctor and politician and the first female mayor in Ohio and one of the first in the United States.

The daughter of Joseph Wilhelm Kaukonen and Karoliina Aila Koivisto, who came to Ohio from Finland, she was born in Lorain. The family later moved to Conneaut, where she attended high school. In 1911, she began studying medicine at the Woman's Medical College of Pennsylvania, graduating in 1915. She completed her residency at the Woman's Hospital of Philadelphia. She first practised in Ashtabula. In 1920, she set up practice in Fairport Harbor.

In 1921, she was elected mayor of Fairport Harbor, one of the first women mayors in the United States and the first in Ohio. She ran on a prohibitionist platform because of her experience treating patients suffering from abuse of bootleg alcohol. Although she was opposed to drinking and dance halls, she defended the bobbed hair, short skirts, dancing and jazz music of the Roaring Twenties; she was also opposed to corsets. During her time in office, Kaukonen and her council used licensing to control the pool rooms and soft drink establishments which had previously been selling bootleg whisky. Some operators were fined or put in jail. She received threats in response to her crackdown on the bootleggers and, at one point, she was assaulted. She resigned as mayor before the end of her term and left for Seattle in 1923.

Kaukonen married in 1928. She later came back to Ohio, settling in Cleveland. She finally moved to Painesville, where she died at the age of 93.
