= Pokka =

Japanese beverage company

- Founded: 1957

POKKA SAPPORO Food & Beverage Ltd. (ポッカサッポロフード&ビバレッジ株式会社, Pokka Sapporo Fūdo & Bibarejji Kabushiki gaisha) is a corporation headquartered in Sapporo, Japan, which sells canned or bottled coffee, flavored tea and an assortment of other beverages.

Pokka is owned by Sapporo Holdings, Japan's fourth largest brewer by volume and makers of Yebisu and Sleeman.

== History ==
In 1957, the company was founded as Nikka Lemon Corporation to manufacture and sell synthetic lemons, and in 1967, the Fair Trade Commission issued an exclusion order to the company for misrepresenting the use of lemon juice even though it was not used. The so-called "Pokkah Lemon Incident" occurred, which drew strong criticism from consumers. In fact, not only Pokka Lemon, but similar products were being marketed by other companies, and the exclusion order had been issued as well.

In 1972, the company focused on the development and sale of Pokka Coffee, an authentic canned coffee, and in 1973, it co-developed a vending machine with Sankyo Electric (now Sanden) that served as both a cold and hot vending machine. After much effort, they developed the world's first technology for manufacturing canned coffee that can be sold continuously heated. The company has also developed lemon tea, shiruko, and cocoa, which can be sold at higher temperatures. In 1983, they developed the world's first canned soup, which could be sold at high temperatures. It was a revolutionary soup that employed an oyster sterilizer to kill high temperature resistant bacteria. Based on the knowledge gained from the development of canned soup, the company developed and launched an instant soup in 1981. The company was listed on the First Section of the Nagoya Stock Exchange in 1985 and on the First Section of the Tokyo Stock Exchange in 1988, and developed mainly in the vending machine business.

Other than Pokka Coffee, the main product is "slow-cooked soup". In 2005, the canned coffee "aromax" was released, with Hiroshi Abe as its image character (the current image character is Tohri Matsuzaka, following the release of "Fantasista" in March 2013).

In 2009, it was known as Singapore's No. 1 Jasmine Green Tea.

In Okinawa Prefecture, the company's subsidiary Okinawa Pokka Corporation produces and sells its own product lineup. In addition to "Sanpincha" and "Uchincha," which are not available on the mainland, the company also produces Blue Seal ice cream chocolate drinks and other products on consignment.

Following the merger with Sapporo Soft Drinks in January 2013, the company strengthened its lineup of fruit juices, carbonated drinks, and sugar-free teas, including Ribbon, Gabu Drink, and Tea with Gyokuro, in addition to the former Pokka Corporation's lineup. On the other hand, in the beverages business, the merger resulted in the consolidation of overlapping lineups, with the former Pokka Corporation products being the focus of the coffee beverage lineup and the former Sapporo beverage lineup being the focus of the unsweetened tea beverage lineup.

In September 2018, Alain Ong, the CEO of Pokka Singapore and Pokka International, was suspended following an internal audit.

== See also ==
- Canned coffee
